= 2012 Arizona House of Representatives election =

- November 6, 2012

All 60 seats in the Arizona House 31 seats needed for a majority
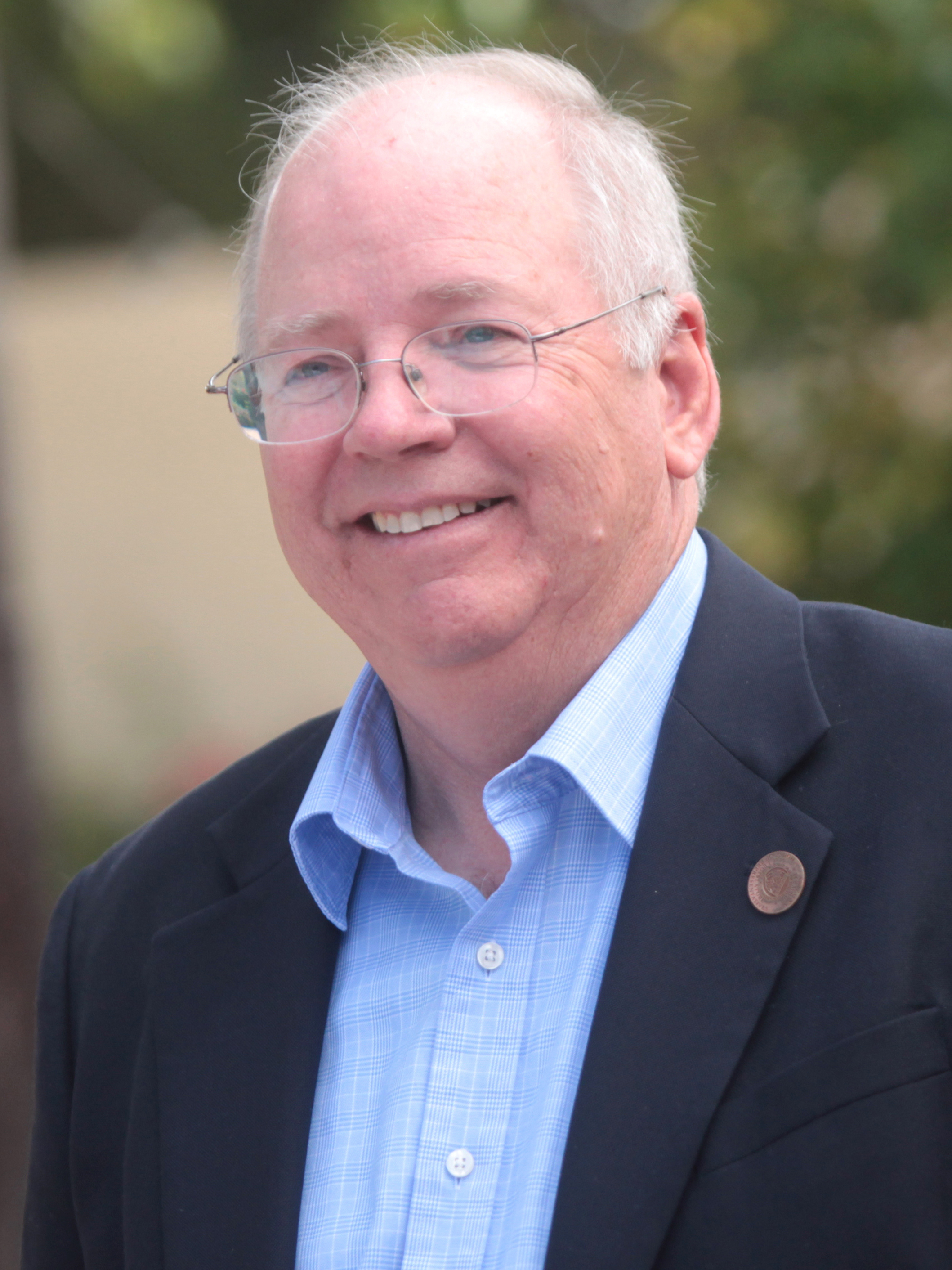

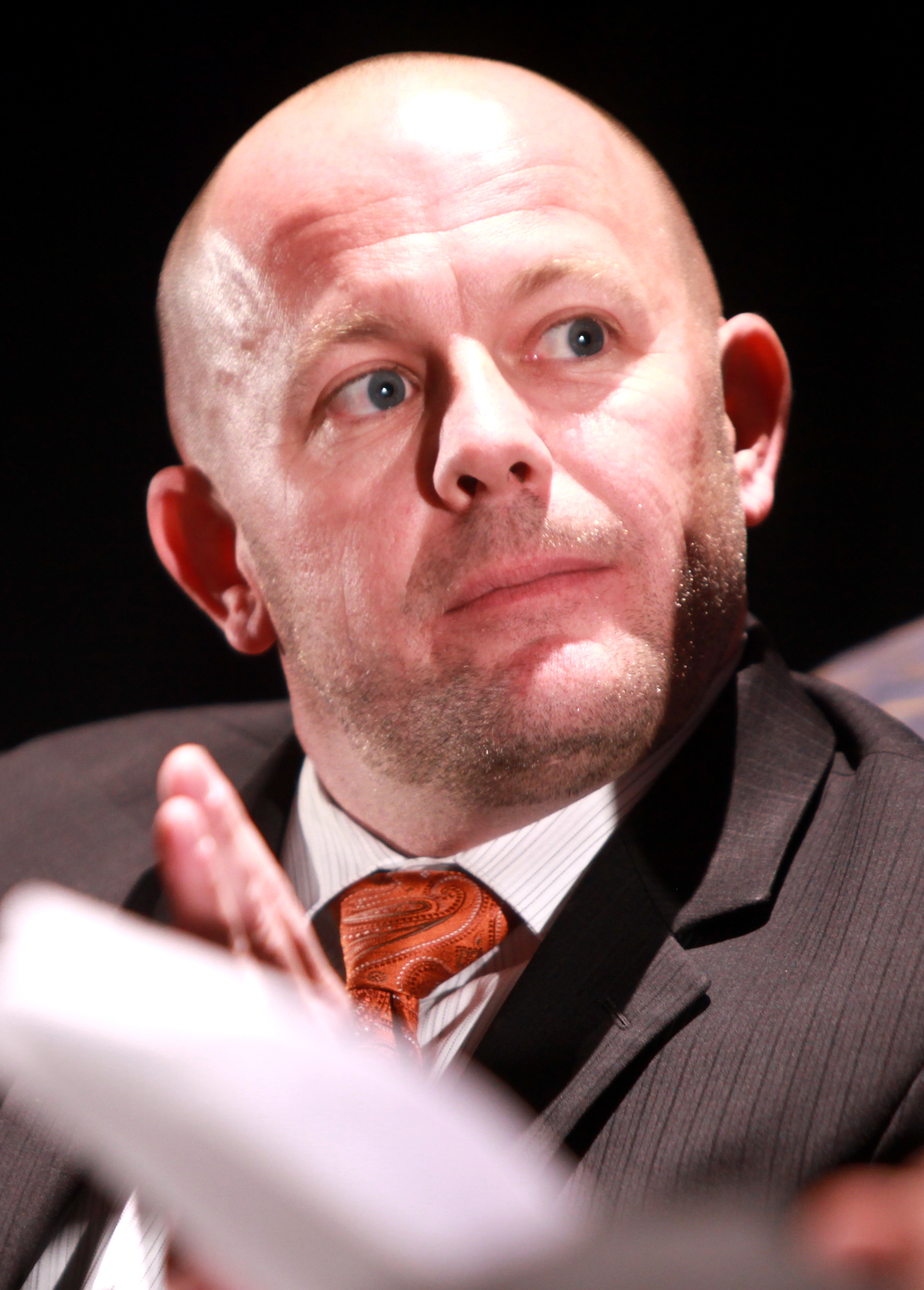

	Majority party	Minority party	Third party
Leader	Andy Tobin	Chad Campbell	Nick Fontana
Party	Republican	Democratic	Independent
Leader's seat	1st-Paulden	24th-Phoenix	29th-Tucson
Last election	40	20	0
Seats before	40	18 (Note: Re-elected in legislative district 29 in 2010 as a Democrat, Representative Daniel Patterson switched political party affiliation to Independent on April 2, 2012. On April 11, 2012, Patterson then resigned from the House. On April 23, 2012, Nicholas "Nick" Fontana (I) was appointed by the Pima County Board of Supervisors to fill the House vacancy in Legislative District 29. In legislative district 17, Democratic representative P. Ben Arredondo resigned from the House on October 5, 2012. Given both the proximity to the end of the term in December and that the legislature was in recess for the remainder of the session, the Maricopa County Board of Supervisors decided not to replace Arredondo and simply left the seat vacant.)	1 (Note: Re-elected in 2010 as a Democrat, Representative Daniel Patterson switched political party affiliation to Independent on April 2, 2012. On April 11, 2012, Patterson then resigned from the House. On April 23, 2012, Nicholas "Nick" Fontana (I) was appointed by the Pima County Board of Supervisors to fill the House vacancy in Legislative District 29.)
Seats after	36	24	0
Seat change	▼4	▲6 (Note: Democrats experienced a net gain of six seats in 2012, including regaining the vacant seat, retaking the Independent seat, and netting four seats from Republicans.)	▼1
- Results: Democratic hold Democratic gain Republican hold
Speaker before election
Kirk Adams
(1/10/2011 - 4/28/2011)
Andy Tobin
(4/28/2011 - 1/14/2013)
Republican
Elected Speaker
Andy Tobin
Republican

The 2012 Arizona House of Representatives election took place on Tuesday, November 6, 2012, with the primary election held on Tuesday, August 28, 2012. Arizona voters elected all 60 members of the Arizona House of Representatives in multi-member districts to serve two-year terms.

The election coincided with United States national elections and Arizona state elections, including U.S. President, U.S. Senate, U.S. House, and Arizona Senate.

Following the previous election in 2010, Republicans held a 40-to-20-seat majority over Democrats. During the legislative session, Representative Daniel Patterson switched political party affiliation from Democrat to Independent on April 2, 2012. On April 11, 2012, Patterson then resigned from the House. On April 23, 2012, Nicholas "Nick" Fontana (I) was appointed by the Pima County Board of Supervisors to fill the House vacancy in Legislative District 29. Additionally, Democratic representative P. Ben Arredondo resigned from the House on October 5, 2012. Given both the proximity to the end of the term in December and that the legislature was in recess for the remainder of the session, the Maricopa County Board of Supervisors decided not to replace Arredondo and simply left the seat vacant. Therefore, on election day in 2012, Republicans had 40 members, Democrats held 18 seats, there was one Independent, and one seat was vacant.

Republicans maintained their majority in 2012, though the GOP majority narrowed to 36 seats. At 24 members, Democrats experienced a net gain of six seats. The newly elected members served in the 51st Arizona State Legislature, during which Republican Andy Tobin was re-elected as Speaker of the Arizona House. (Note: Andy Tobin was re-elected by acclamation as Speaker for the 51st legislature.)

These were the first elections in Arizona following the 2010 United States redistricting cycle, which resulted in redrawn legislative district boundaries.

== Retiring Incumbents ==
=== Democrats ===
1. District 2: Thomas E. "Tom" Chabin (Note: Representative Tom Chabin was redistricted from district 2 to 6. He ran for Arizona Senate, but was defeated in the general election by Republican Chester Crandell.)
2. District 13: Anna Tovar (Note: Representative Anna Tovar was redistricted from district 13 to 19. She was elected to the Arizona Senate.)
3. District 15: Katie Hobbs (Note: Representative Katie Hobbs was redistricted from district 15 to 24. She was elected to the Arizona Senate, defeating Republican Augustine "Auggie" Bartning in the general election.)
4. District 17: Ed Ableser (Note: Representative Ed Ableser was redistricted from district 17 to 26. He was elected to the Arizona Senate, defeating Republican incumbent senator Jerry Lewis and Libertarian Damian Trabel in the general election.)
5. District 24: Lynne Pancrazi (Note: Representative Lynne Pancrazi was redistricted from district 24 to 4. She was elected to the Arizona Senate.)
6. District 28: Steve Farley (Note: Representative Steve Farley was redistricted from district 28 to 9. He was elected to the Arizona Senate, defeating Republican Tyler Mott in the general election.)
7. District 29: Matt Heinz (Note: Representative Matt Heinz ran for U.S. House, but was defeated in the Democratic primary election by incumbent Ron Barber.)

=== Republicans ===
1. District 3: Nancy G. McLain (Note: Representative Nancy G. McLain was redistricted from district 3 to 5. She ran for Arizona Senate, but was defeated in the Republican primary election by Kelli Ward.) (term-limited)
2. District 4: Jack Harper
3. District 5: Chester Crandell (Note: Representative Chester Crandell was redistricted from district 5 to 6. He was elected to the Arizona Senate, defeating Democrat Thomas E. "Tom" Chabin in the general election.)
4. District 10: James Weiers (term-limited)
5. District 10: Kimberly Yee (Note: Representative Kimberly Yee was redistricted from district 10 to 20. She was elected to the Arizona Senate, defeating Democrat Michael Powell and Independent Doug Quelland in the general election.)
6. District 12: Jerry P. Weiers (term-limited)
7. District 18: Steve Court
8. District 18: Cecil P. Ash
9. District 22: Steve R. Urie
10. District 23: John Fillmore (Note: Representative John Fillmore was redistricted from district 23 to 16. He ran for Arizona Senate, but was defeated in the Republican primary election by incumbent senator Rich Crandall.)
11. District 25: Peggy Judd
12. District 26: Vic Williams
13. District 26: Terri Proud

=== Independent ===
1. District 29: Nicholas "Nick" Fontana

== Incumbents Defeated in Primary Election ==
=== Republicans ===
1. District 13: Russell "Russ" Jones (Note: Representative Russell "Russ" Jones was redistricted from district 24 to 13. He ran for re-election in the newly re-drawn legislative district, but was defeated in the Republican primary election by fellow incumbent Steve Montenegro and newcomer Darin Mitchell. Both Montenegro and Mitchell won in the general election.)
2. District 15: David Burnell Smith (Note: Representative David Burnell Smith was redistricted from district 7 to 15. He ran for re-election in the newly re-drawn legislative district, but was defeated in the Republican primary election by fellow incumbent Heather Carter and former representative John Allen. Both Carter and Allen won in the general election.)

== Incumbents Defeated in General Election ==
=== Republicans ===
1. District 10: Ted Vogt (Note: Representative Ted Vogt was redistricted from district 30 to 10. He ran for re-election in the newly re-drawn legislative district, but was defeated in the general election by two Democrats, fellow incumbent Bruce Wheeler and newcomer Stefanie Mach.)
2. District 28: Amanda Reeve (Note: Representative Amanda Reeve was redistricted from district 6 to 28. She ran for re-election in the newly re-drawn legislative district, but was defeated in the general election by fellow incumbents Republican Kate Brophy McGee and Democrat Eric Meyer, who themselves were both redistricted from the old 11th district to the new 28th district.)

== Predictions ==
Source	Ranking	As of
Governing	Likely R	October 24, 2012

== Summary of results ==
Italics denote an open seat held by the incumbent party; bold text denotes a gain for a party.

District	Incumbent	Party	Elected Representative	Outcome
1st	Andy Tobin	Rep	Andy Tobin	Rep Hold
1st	Karen Fann	Rep	Karen Fann	Rep Hold
2nd	Thomas E. "Tom" Chabin	Dem	Rosanna Gabaldón	Dem Hold
2nd	Albert Hale (Note: Redistricted from district 2 to 7.)	Dem	Andrea Dalessandro (Note: Democratic representative Andrea Dalessandro resigned on January 21, 2014 and was appointed by the Pima County Board of Supervisors to fill the Senate vacancy in Legislative District 2. Demion Clinco (D) was appointed on February 6, 2014 by the Pima County Board of Supervisors to fill the House vacancy in Legislative District 2.)	Dem Hold
3rd	Nancy G. McLain	Rep	**Sally Ann Gonzales** (Note: Redistricted from district 27 to 3.)	**Dem Gain**
3rd	Doris Goodale (Note: Redistricted from district 3 to 5.)	Rep	**Macario Saldate** (Note: Redistricted from district 27 to 3.)	**Dem Gain**
4th	Jack Harper	Rep	**Lisa Otondo**	**Dem Gain**
4th	Phil Lovas (Note: Republican representative Judy M. Burges resigned on January 23, 2012 and was appointed by the Maricopa County Board of Supervisors to fill the Senate vacancy in Legislative District 4. Phil Lovas (R) was appointed on February 21, 2012 by the Maricopa County Board of Supervisors to fill the House vacancy in Legislative District 4. Following redistricting, Representative Lovas was redistricted from district 4 to 22.)	Rep	**Juan Carlos "J.C." Escamilla**	**Dem Gain**
5th	Brenda Barton (Note: Redistricted from district 5 to 6.)	Rep	Doris Goodale	Rep Hold
5th	Chester Crandell	Rep	Sonny Borrelli	Rep Hold
6th	Carl Seel (Note: Redistricted from district 6 to 20.)	Rep	Brenda Barton	Rep Hold
6th	Amanda Reeve	Rep	Bob Thorpe	Rep Hold
7th	Heather Carter (Note: Redistricted from district 7 to 15.)	Rep	**Albert Hale**	**Dem Gain**
7th	David Burnell Smith	Rep	**Jamescita Peshlakai**	**Dem Gain**
8th	John Kavanagh (Note: Redistricted from district 8 to 23.)	Rep	Franklin M. "Frank" Pratt (Note: Redistricted from district 23 to 8.)	Rep Hold
8th	Michelle Ugenti (Note: Redistricted from district 8 to 23.)	Rep	Thomas "T. J." Shope	Rep Hold
9th	Debbie Lesko (Note: Redistricted from district 9 to 21.)	Rep	**Victoria Steele**	**Dem Gain**
9th	Rick Gray (Note: Redistricted from district 9 to 21.)	Rep	Ethan Orr	Rep Hold
10th	James Weiers	Rep	**Bruce Wheeler** (Note: Redistricted from district 28 to 10.)	**Dem Gain**
10th	Kimberly Yee	Rep	**Stefanie Mach**	**Dem Gain**
11th	Kate Brophy McGee (Note: Redistricted from district 11 to 28.)	Rep	Steve Smith	Rep Hold
11th	Eric Meyer (Note: Redistricted from district 11 to 28.)	Dem	**Adam Kwasman**	**Rep Gain**
12th	Jerry P. Weiers	Rep	Eddie Farnsworth (Note: Redistricted from district 22 to 12.)	Rep Hold
12th	Steve Montenegro (Note: Redistricted from district 12 to 13.)	Rep	Warren Petersen	Rep Hold
13th	Anna Tovar	Dem	**Steve Montenegro**	**Rep Gain**
13th	Martín J. Quezada (Note: Democratic representative Richard Miranda resigned on February 20, 2012 from the House. Martín J. Quezada (D) was appointed by the Maricopa County Board of Supervisors on March 2, 2012 to fill the House vacancy in Legislative District 13. Following redistricting, Representative Quezada was redistricted from district 13 to 29.)	Dem	**Darin Mitchell**	**Rep Gain**
14th	Chad Campbell (Note: Redistricted from district 14 to 24.)	Dem	**David Gowan** (Note: Redistricted from district 30 to 14.)	**Rep Gain**
14th	Debbie McCune Davis (Note: Redistricted from district 14 to 30.)	Dem	**David Stevens** (Note: Redistricted from district 25 to 14.)	**Rep Gain**
15th	Lela Alston (Note: Redistricted from district 15 to 24.)	Dem	**Heather Carter**	**Rep Gain**
15th	Katie Hobbs	Dem	**John Allen**	**Rep Gain**
16th	Catherine Miranda (Note: Redistricted from district 16 to 27.)	Dem	**Kelly Townsend**	**Rep Gain**
16th	Ruben Gallego (Note: Democratic representative Ruben Gallego was redistricted from district 16 to 27 and re-elected in the new district. He resigned on March 14, 2014. Norma Muñoz (D) was appointed on March 24, 2014 by the Maricopa County Board of Supervisors to fill the House vacancy in Legislative District 27.)	Dem	**Doug Coleman**	**Rep Gain**
17th	Ed Ableser	Dem	**Javan Daniel "J.D." Mesnard** (Note: Redistricted from district 21 to 17.)	**Rep Gain**
17th	Vacant (Note: Democratic representative P. Ben Arredondo resigned from the House on October 5, 2012. Given both the proximity to the end of the term in December and that the legislature was in recess for the remainder of the session, the Maricopa County Board of Supervisors decided not to replace Arredondo and simply left the seat vacant.)		**Thomas "Tom" Forese** (Note: Redistricted from district 21 to 17.)	**Rep Gain**
18th	Steve Court	Rep	Bob Robson (Note: Redistricted from district 20 to 18.)	Rep Hold
18th	Cecil P. Ash	Rep	Jeff Dial (Note: Redistricted from district 20 to 18.)	Rep Hold
19th	Justin Pierce (Note: Republican representative and Speaker Kirk Adams resigned on April 28, 2011 from the House to campaign for a seat in Congress. Justin Pierce (R) was appointed by the Maricopa County Board of Supervisors on May 23, 2011 and sworn in as a member of the House of Representatives on May 25, 2011 to fill the House vacancy in Legislative District 19. Following redistricting, Representative Pierce was redistricted from district 19 to 25.)	Rep	**Lupe Chavira Contreras**	**Dem Gain**
19th	Justin Olson (Note: Redistricted from district 19 to 25.)	Rep	**Mark A. Cardenas**	**Dem Gain**
20th	Bob Robson	Rep	Carl Seel	Rep Hold
20th	Jeff Dial	Rep	Paul Boyer	Rep Hold
21st	Javan Daniel "J.D." Mesnard	Rep	Rick Gray	Rep Hold
21st	Thomas "Tom" Forese	Rep	Debbie Lesko	Rep Hold
22nd	Eddie Farnsworth	Rep	Phil Lovas	Rep Hold
22nd	Steve R. Urie	Rep	David Livingston	Rep Hold
23rd	Franklin M. "Frank" Pratt	Rep	John Kavanagh	Rep Hold
23rd	John Fillmore	Rep	Michelle Ugenti	Rep Hold
24th	Lynne Pancrazi	Dem	Lela Alston	Dem Hold
24th	Russell "Russ" Jones	Rep	**Chad Campbell**	**Dem Gain**
25th	David Stevens	Rep	Justin Olson	Rep Hold
25th	Peggy Judd	Rep	Justin Pierce	Rep Hold
26th	Vic Williams	Rep	**Juan Mendez**	**Dem Gain**
26th	Terri Proud	Rep	**Andrew Sherwood**	**Dem Gain**
27th	Sally Ann Gonzales	Dem	Catherine Miranda	Dem Hold
27th	Macario Saldate	Dem	Ruben Gallego	Dem Hold
28th	Steve Farley	Dem	Eric Meyer	Dem Hold
28th	Bruce Wheeler	Dem	**Kate Brophy McGee**	**Rep Gain**
29th	Matt Heinz	Dem	Martín J. Quezada	Dem Hold
29th	Nicholas "Nick" Fontana	Ind	**Lydia Hernández**	**Dem Gain**
30th	David Gowan	Rep	**Debbie McCune Davis**	**Dem Gain**
30th	Ted Vogt	Rep	**Jonathan Larkin**	**Dem Gain**

== Detailed results ==
Sources for election results:

=== District 1 ===
Primary Election Results
Party	Candidate	Votes	%
Republican Party Primary Results
Republican	Andy Tobin (incumbent)	22,167	40.98%
Republican	Karen Fann (incumbent)	18,142	33.54%
Republican	Lori Klein	13,781	25.48%
Total votes		54,090	100.00%

General Election Results
Party	Candidate	Votes	%
Republican	Andy Tobin (incumbent)	62,379	50.64%
Republican	Karen Fann (incumbent)	60,800	49.36%
Total votes		123,179	100.00%
Republican hold			
Republican hold			

=== District 2 ===
Primary Election Results
Party	Candidate	Votes	%
Democratic Party Primary Results
Democratic	Andrea Dalessandro	9,603	51.19%
Democratic	Rosanna Gabaldón	9,158	48.81%
Total votes		18,761	100.00%
Republican Party Primary Results
Republican	John Christopher Ackerley	8,687	100.00%
Total votes		8,687	100.00%

General Election Results
Party	Candidate	Votes	%
Democratic	Andrea Dalessandro	28,266	35.77%
Democratic	Rosanna Gabaldón	27,081	34.27%
Republican	John Christopher Ackerley	23,677	29.96%
Total votes		79,024	100.00%
Democratic hold			
Democratic hold			

=== District 3 ===
Primary Election Results
Party	Candidate	Votes	%
Democratic Party Primary Results
Democratic	Sally Ann Gonzales (incumbent)	11,317	54.09%
Democratic	Macario Saldate (incumbent)	9,605	45.91%
Total votes		20,922	100.00%
Republican Party Primary Results
Republican	Alan Aversa (Note: The candidate ran a write-in campaign in this election.) (Note: Despite coming in first place in the Republican primary as a write-in candidate, Alan Aversa did not advance to the general election.)	90	100.00%
Total votes		90	100.00%

General Election Results
Party	Candidate	Votes	%
Democratic	Sally Ann Gonzales (incumbent)	35,795	53.86%
Democratic	Macario Saldate (incumbent)	30,662	46.14%
Total votes		66,457	100.00%
Democratic gain from Republican			
Democratic gain from Republican			

=== District 4 ===
Primary Election Results
Party	Candidate	Votes	%
Democratic Party Primary Results
Democratic	Lisa Otondo	4,238	34.91%
Democratic	Juan Carlos "J.C." Escamilla	4,038	33.26%
Democratic	Charlene R. Fernandez	3,865	31.83%
Total votes		12,141	100.00%

General Election Results
Party	Candidate	Votes	%
Democratic	Lisa Otondo	23,334	53.24%
Democratic	Juan Carlos "J.C." Escamilla	20,498	46.76%
Total votes		43,832	100.00%
Democratic gain from Republican			
Democratic gain from Republican			

=== District 5 ===
Primary Election Results
Party	Candidate	Votes	%
Republican Party Primary Results
Republican	Doris Goodale (incumbent)	14,056	43.37%
Republican	Sonny Borrelli	8,672	26.76%
Republican	Wyatt Brooks	5,369	16.56%
Republican	George Albert Schnittgrund	4,315	13.31%
Total votes		32,412	100.00%
Democratic Party Primary Results
Democratic	P.L. Durbin	4,884	100.00%
Total votes		4,884	100.00%

General Election Results
Party	Candidate	Votes	%
Republican	Doris Goodale (incumbent)	41,217	42.48%
Republican	Sonny Borrelli	35,154	36.23%
Democratic	P.L. Durbin	20,647	21.28%
Total votes		97,018	100.00%
Republican hold			
Republican hold			

=== District 6 ===
Primary Election Results
Party	Candidate	Votes	%
Republican Party Primary Results
Republican	Bob Thorpe	14,280	50.70%
Republican	Brenda Barton (incumbent)	13,885	49.30%
Total votes		28,165	100.00%
Democratic Party Primary Results
Democratic	Angela LeFevre	9,587	53.43%
Democratic	Doug Ballard	8,355	46.57%
Total votes		17,942	100.00%

General Election Results
Party	Candidate	Votes	%
Republican	Bob Thorpe	42,675	27.64%
Republican	Brenda Barton (incumbent)	41,122	26.64%
Democratic	Angela LeFevre	36,302	23.52%
Democratic	Doug Ballard	34,274	22.20%
Total votes		154,373	100.00%
Republican hold			
Republican hold			

=== District 7 ===
Primary Election Results
Party	Candidate	Votes	%
Democratic Party Primary Results
Democratic	Albert Hale (incumbent)	13,890	49.15%
Democratic	Jamescita Peshlakai	7,803	27.61%
Democratic	Phil Stago	6,570	23.25%
Total votes		28,263	100.00%

General Election Results
Party	Candidate	Votes	%
Democratic	Albert Hale (incumbent)	40,245	58.74%
Democratic	Jamescita Peshlakai	28,269	41.26%
Total votes		68,514	100.00%
Democratic gain from Republican			
Democratic gain from Republican			

=== District 8 ===
Primary Election Results
Party	Candidate	Votes	%
Republican Party Primary Results
Republican	Frank Pratt (incumbent)	7,944	58.45%
Republican	Thomas "T. J." Shope	5,646	41.55%
Total votes		13,590	100.00%
Democratic Party Primary Results
Democratic	Ernest Bustamante	6,173	40.11%
Democratic	Emily Verdugo	5,636	36.62%
Democratic	George Arredondo	3,581	23.27%
Total votes		15,390	100.00%

General Election Results
Party	Candidate	Votes	%
Republican	Frank Pratt (incumbent)	24,195	27.60%
Republican	Thomas "T. J." Shope	22,102	25.21%
Democratic	Ernest Bustamante	21,258	24.25%
Democratic	Emily Verdugo	20,102	22.93%
Total votes		87,657	100.00%
Republican hold			
Republican hold			

=== District 9 ===
Primary Election Results
Party	Candidate	Votes	%
Democratic Party Primary Results
Democratic	Victoria Steele	11,661	35.71%
Democratic	Mohur Sarah Sidhwa	11,490	35.19%
Democratic	Dustin Cox	9,500	29.10%
Total votes		32,651	100.00%
Republican Party Primary Results
Republican	Ethan Orr	15,879	98.85%
Republican	Cynthia Miley (Note: Despite coming in second place in the Republican primary as a write-in candidate, Cynthia Miley did not advance to the general election.)	185	1.15%
Total votes		16,064	100.00%

General Election Results
Party	Candidate	Votes	%
Democratic	Victoria Steele	44,609	35.05%
Republican	Ethan Orr	42,626	33.49%
Democratic	Mohur Sarah Sidhwa	40,034	31.46%
Total votes		127,269	100.00%
Democratic gain from Republican			
Republican hold			

=== District 10 ===
Primary Election Results
Party	Candidate	Votes	%
Democratic Party Primary Results
Democratic	Bruce Wheeler (incumbent)	12,235	39.00%
Democratic	Stefanie Mach	11,525	36.73%
Democratic	Brandon Patrick	7,614	24.27%
Total votes		31,374	100.00%
Republican Party Primary Results
Republican	Ted Vogt (incumbent)	14,982	55.16%
Republican	Todd A. Clodfelter	12,181	44.84%
Total votes		27,163	100.00%

General Election Results
Party	Candidate	Votes	%
Democratic	Bruce Wheeler (incumbent)	43,058	27.38%
Democratic	Stefanie Mach	40,843	25.97%
Republican	Ted Vogt (incumbent)	37,758	24.01%
Republican	Todd A. Clodfelter	35,609	22.64%
Total votes		157,268	100.00%
Democratic gain from Republican			
Democratic gain from Republican			

=== District 11 ===
Primary Election Results
Party	Candidate	Votes	%
Republican Party Primary Results
Republican	Steve Smith	16,201	55.94%
Republican	Adam Kwasman	12,758	44.06%
Total votes		28,959	100.00%
Democratic Party Primary Results
Democratic	Dave Joseph	11,408	100.00%
Total votes		11,408	100.00%

General Election Results
Party	Candidate	Votes	%
Republican	Steve Smith	44,928	36.72%
Republican	Adam Kwasman	41,732	34.10%
Democratic	Dave Joseph	35,707	29.18%
Total votes		122,367	100.00%
Republican hold			
Republican gain from Democratic			

=== District 12 ===
Primary Election Results
Party	Candidate	Votes	%
Republican Party Primary Results
Republican	Eddie Farnsworth (incumbent)	14,816	41.15%
Republican	Warren Petersen	12,500	34.72%
Republican	Larry "Lucky" Chesley	8,688	24.13%
Total votes		36,004	100.00%

General Election Results
Party	Candidate	Votes	%
Republican	Eddie Farnsworth (incumbent)	53,925	50.63%
Republican	Warren Petersen	52,590	49.37%
Total votes		106,515	100.00%
Republican hold			
Republican hold			

=== District 13 ===
Primary Election Results
Party	Candidate	Votes	%
Republican Party Primary Results
Republican	Steve Montenegro (incumbent)	10,189	39.11%
Republican	Darin Mitchell	8,572	32.90%
Republican	Russ Jones (incumbent)	7,294	27.99%
Total votes		26,055	100.00%

General Election Results
Party	Candidate	Votes	%
Republican	Steve Montenegro (incumbent)	39,372	51.67%
Republican	Darin Mitchell	35,968	47.21%
Republican	Robert Garcia	323	0.42%
Republican	John Minore	225	0.30%
Republican	Cheryl Brown	194	0.25%
Republican	Clair "Van"	110	0.14%
Total votes		76,192	100.00%
Republican gain from Democratic			
Republican gain from Democratic			

=== District 14 ===
Primary Election Results
Party	Candidate	Votes	%
Republican Party Primary Results
Republican	David Gowan (incumbent)	15,955	51.70%
Republican	David Stevens (incumbent)	14,904	48.30%
Total votes		30,859	100.00%
Democratic Party Primary Results
Democratic	Mark Stonebraker	9,566	51.46%
Democratic	Robert Leach	9,022	48.54%
Total votes		18,588	100.00%

General Election Results
Party	Candidate	Votes	%
Republican	David Gowan (incumbent)	43,967	30.75%
Republican	David Stevens (incumbent)	43,585	30.48%
Democratic	Mark Stonebraker	27,769	19.42%
Democratic	Robert Leach	27,675	19.35%
Total votes		142,996	100.000%
Republican gain from Democratic			
Republican gain from Democratic			

=== District 15 ===
Primary Election Results
Party	Candidate	Votes	%
Republican Party Primary Results
Republican	Heather Carter (incumbent)	13,196	39.63%
Republican	John Allen	7,813	23.46%
Republican	David Burnell Smith (incumbent)	7,397	22.21%
Republican	James Bearup	4,895	14.70%
Total votes		33,301	100.00%
Democratic Party Primary Results
Democratic	Patricia Flickner	6,511	100.00%
Total votes		6,511	100.00%

General Election Results
Party	Candidate	Votes	%
Republican	Heather Carter (incumbent)	50,716	39.28%
Republican	John Allen	46,612	36.10%
Democratic	Patricia Flickner	31,775	24.61%
Total votes		129,103	100.00%
Republican gain from Democratic			
Republican gain from Democratic			

=== District 16 ===
Primary Election Results
Party	Candidate	Votes	%
Republican Party Primary Results
Republican	Kelly Townsend	9,398	31.53%
Republican	Doug Coleman	8,021	26.91%
Republican	Jeff Davis	7,064	23.70%
Republican	Judy Novalsky	5,328	17.87%
Total votes		29,811	100.00%
Democratic Party Primary Results
Democratic	Matthew Cerra	6,250	100.00%
Total votes		6,250	100.00%
Green Party Primary Results
Green	Bill Maher	3	100.00%
Total votes		3	100.00%

General Election Results
Party	Candidate	Votes	%
Republican	Doug Coleman	41,063	35.38%
Republican	Kelly Townsend	40,720	35.09%
Democratic	Matthew Cerra	24,942	21.49%
Green	Bill Maher	9,094	7.84%
Democratic	Cara Prior	234	0.20%
Total votes		116,053	100.00%
Republican gain from Democratic			
Republican gain from Democratic			

=== District 17 ===
Primary Election Results
Party	Candidate	Votes	%
Republican Party Primary Results
Republican	Tom Forese (incumbent)	13,974	50.98%
Republican	J.D. Mesnard (incumbent)	13,439	49.02%
Total votes		27,413	100.00%
Democratic Party Primary Results
Democratic	Karyn Lathan	7,379	100.00%
Total votes		7,379	100.00%

General Election Results
Party	Candidate	Votes	%
Republican	Tom Forese (incumbent)	44,422	35.92%
Republican	J.D. Mesnard (incumbent)	42,955	34.73%
Democratic	Karyn Lathan	36,265	29.32%
Republican	Jason Harris	41	0.03%
Total votes		123,683	100.00%
Republican gain from Democratic			
Republican gain from Democratic			

=== District 18 ===
Primary Election Results
Party	Candidate	Votes	%
Republican Party Primary Results
Republican	Jeff Dial (incumbent)	15,677	51.47%
Republican	Bob Robson (incumbent)	14,780	48.53%
Total votes		30,457	100.00%
Democratic Party Primary Results
Democratic	Corey Harris	9,943	52.22%
Democratic	Darin Fisher	9,097	47.78%
Total votes		19,040	100.00%

General Election Results
Party	Candidate	Votes	%
Republican	Jeff Dial (incumbent)	46,095	26.15%
Republican	Bob Robson (incumbent)	44,204	25.08%
Democratic	Corey Harris	39,409	22.36%
Democratic	Darin Fisher	38,347	21.75%
Independent	Brent Fine	8,221	4.66%
Total votes		176,276	100.00%
Republican hold			
Republican hold			

=== District 19 ===
Primary Election Results
Party	Candidate	Votes	%
Democratic Party Primary Results
Democratic	Mark A. Cardenas	3,005	30.58%
Democratic	Lupe Chavira Contreras	2,566	26.11%
Democratic	Lorenzo Sierra	2,433	24.76%
Democratic	Bryan Kilgore	1,824	18.56%
Total votes		9,828	100.00%

General Election Results
Party	Candidate	Votes	%
Democratic	Lupe Chavira Contreras	23,674	50.71%
Democratic	Mark A. Cardenas	23,007	49.29%
Total votes		46,681	100.00%
Democratic gain from Republican			
Democratic gain from Republican			

=== District 20 ===
Primary Election Results
Party	Candidate	Votes	%
Republican Party Primary Results
Republican	Paul Boyer	12,224	49.06%
Republican	Carl Seel (incumbent)	8,990	36.08%
Republican	George H. Benavides, Sr.	3,701	14.85%
Total votes		24,915	100.00%
Democratic Party Primary Results
Democratic	Jackie Thrasher	6,891	54.51%
Democratic	Tonya Norwood	5,750	45.49%
Total votes		12,641	100.00%
Green Party Primary Results
Green	Erik Andersen	0	-
Total votes		0	-

General Election Results
Party	Candidate	Votes	%
Republican	Paul Boyer	37,143	29.04%
Republican	Carl Seel (incumbent)	32,865	25.70%
Democratic	Jackie Thrasher	30,342	23.72%
Democratic	Tonya Norwood	27,542	21.54%
Total votes		127,892	100.00%
Republican hold			
Republican hold			

=== District 21 ===
Primary Election Results
Party	Candidate	Votes	%
Republican Party Primary Results
Republican	Debbie Lesko (incumbent)	14,771	54.13%
Republican	Rick Gray (incumbent)	12,515	45.87%
Total votes		27,286	100.00%
Democratic Party Primary Results
Democratic	Carol Lokare	6,897	51.77%
Democratic	Sheri Van Horsen	6,426	48.23%
Total votes		13,323	100.00%

General Election Results
Party	Candidate	Votes	%
Republican	Debbie Lesko (incumbent)	41,023	30.09%
Republican	Rick Gray (incumbent)	39,791	29.19%
Democratic	Carol Lokare	28,715	21.06%
Democratic	Sheri Van Horsen	26,790	19.65%
Libertarian	Helmuth Hack	4	0.00%
Total votes		136,323	100.00%
Republican hold			
Republican hold			

=== District 22 ===
Primary Election Results
Party	Candidate	Votes	%
Republican Party Primary Results
Republican	Phil Lovas (incumbent)	16,727	42.62%
Republican	David Livingston	13,000	33.12%
Republican	Jeanette Dubreil	9,521	24.26%
Total votes		39,248	100.00%

General Election Results
Party	Candidate	Votes	%
Republican	David Livingston	60,093	50.48%
Republican	Phil Lovas (incumbent)	58,700	49.31%
Independent	Pat White	261	0.22%
Total votes		119,054	100.00%
Republican hold			
Republican hold			

=== District 23 ===
Primary Election Results
Party	Candidate	Votes	%
Republican Party Primary Results
Republican	John Kavanagh (incumbent)	20,922	41.27%
Republican	Michelle Ugenti (incumbent)	18,106	35.71%
Republican	Jennifer Petersen	11,672	23.02%
Total votes		50,700	100.00%

General Election Results
Party	Candidate	Votes	%
Republican	John Kavanagh (incumbent)	68,527	50.63%
Republican	Michelle Ugenti (incumbent)	66,827	49.37%
Total votes		135,354	100.00%
Republican hold			
Republican hold			

=== District 24 ===
Primary Election Results
Party	Candidate	Votes	%
Democratic Party Primary Results
Democratic	Lela Alston (incumbent)	7,652	38.54%
Democratic	Chad Campbell (incumbent)	7,121	35.87%
Democratic	Jean Cheuvront McDermott	3,174	15.99%
Democratic	Tom Nerini	1,907	9.61%
Total votes		19,854	100.00%
Republican Party Primary Results
Republican	Brian Kaufman	6,779	100.00%
Total votes		6,779	100.00%
Green Party Primary Results
Green	Gerard Davis	5	100.00%
Total votes		5	100.00%

General Election Results
Party	Candidate	Votes	%
Democratic	Lela Alston (incumbent)	34,018	36.76%
Democratic	Chad Campbell (incumbent)	33,075	35.75%
Republican	Brian Kaufman	19,491	21.06%
Green	Gerard Davis	5,946	6.43%
Total votes		92,530	100.00%
Democratic hold			
Democratic gain from Republican			

=== District 25 ===
Primary Election Results
Party	Candidate	Votes	%
Republican Party Primary Results
Republican	Justin Pierce (incumbent)	19,868	51.93%
Republican	Justin D. Olson (incumbent)	18,392	48.07%
Total votes		38,260	100.00%
Democratic Party Primary Results
Democratic	David Butler	6,921	100.00%
Total votes		6,921	100.00%

General Election Results
Party	Candidate	Votes	%
Republican	Justin Pierce (incumbent)	50,017	39.22%
Republican	Justin D. Olson (incumbent)	48,335	37.90%
Democratic	David Butler	29,169	22.87%
Total votes		127,521	100.00%
Republican hold			
Republican hold			

=== District 26 ===
Primary Election Results
Party	Candidate	Votes	%
Democratic Party Primary Results
Democratic	Juan Mendez	5,707	52.03%
Democratic	Andrew Sherwood	5,262	47.97%
Total votes		10,969	100.00%
Republican Party Primary Results
Republican	Raymond D. Speakman	3,725	30.71%
Republican	Mary Lou Taylor	3,611	29.77%
Republican	Jason Youn	3,206	26.43%
Republican	Buckley Merrill	1,587	13.08%
Total votes		12,129	100.00%
Libertarian Party Primary Results
Libertarian	Chris Will	73	100.00%
Total votes		73	100.00%
Green Party Primary Results
Green	Haryaksha Gregor Knauer	32	100.00%
Total votes		32	100.00%

General Election Results
Party	Candidate	Votes	%
Democratic	Juan Mendez	24,213	28.17%
Democratic	Andrew Sherwood	23,481	27.31%
Republican	Mary Lou Taylor	16,766	19.50%
Republican	Raymond D. Speakman	16,153	18.79%
Libertarian	Chris Will	3,480	4.05%
Green	Haryaksha Gregor Knauer	1,872	2.18%
Total votes		85,965	100.00%
Democratic gain from Republican			
Democratic gain from Republican			

=== District 27 ===
Primary Election Results
Party	Candidate	Votes	%
Democratic Party Primary Results
Democratic	Ruben Gallego (incumbent)	4,996	38.05%
Democratic	Catherine Miranda (incumbent)	4,800	36.56%
Democratic	Reginald Bolding	3,334	25.39%
Total votes		13,130	100.00%
Republican Party Primary Results
Republican	Daniel Coleman	2,622	97.04%
Republican	Art Olivas (Note: Despite coming in second place in the Republican primary as a write-in candidate, Art Olivas did not advance to the general election.)	80	2.96%
Total votes		2,702	100.00%
Green Party Primary Results
Green	Ángel Torres	20	100.00%
Total votes		20	100.00%

General Election Results
Party	Candidate	Votes	%
Democratic	Catherine Miranda (incumbent)	28,683	40.98%
Democratic	Ruben Gallego (incumbent)	27,522	39.32%
Republican	Daniel Coleman	10,088	14.41%
Green	Ángel Torres	3,702	5.29%
Total votes		69,995	100.00%
Democratic hold			
Democratic hold			

=== District 28 ===
Primary Election Results
Party	Candidate	Votes	%
Democratic Party Primary Results
Democratic	Eric Meyer (incumbent)	11,777	100.00%
Total votes		11,777	100.00%
Republican Party Primary Results
Republican	Kate Brophy McGee (incumbent)	17,971	55.90%
Republican	Amanda Reeve (incumbent)	14,179	44.10%
Total votes		32,150	100.00%
Libertarian Party Primary Results
Libertarian	Jim Iannuzo	37	100.00%
Total votes		37	100.00%

General Election Results
Party	Candidate	Votes	%
Republican	Kate Brophy McGee (incumbent)	46,225	32.78%
Democratic	Eric Meyer (incumbent)	43,081	30.55%
Republican	Amanda Reeve (incumbent)	41,102	29.15%
Libertarian	Jim Iannuzo	10,589	7.51%
Total votes		140,997	100.00%
Republican gain from Democratic			
Democratic hold			

=== District 29 ===
Primary Election Results
Party	Candidate	Votes	%
Democratic Party Primary Results
Democratic	Martín J. Quezada (incumbent)	3,336	35.95%
Democratic	Lydia Hernández	3,262	35.15%
Democratic	Martin Samaniego	2,681	28.89%
Total votes		9,279	100.00%
Republican Party Primary Results
Republican	Charlie Ellis (Note: Despite coming in first place in the Republican primary as a write-in candidate, Charlie Ellis did not advance to the general election.)	60	100.00%
Total votes		60	100.00%
Libertarian Party Primary Results
Libertarian	Bill Barker (Note: Despite coming in first place in the Libertarian primary as a write-in candidate, Bill Barker did not advance to the general election.)	9	100.00%
Total votes		9	100.00%

General Election Results
Party	Candidate	Votes	%
Democratic	Lydia Hernández	21,870	52.05%
Democratic	Martín J. Quezada (incumbent)	20,150	47.95%
Total votes		42,020	100.00%
Democratic gain from Independent			
Democratic hold			

=== District 30 ===
Primary Election Results
Party	Candidate	Votes	%
Democratic Party Primary Results
Democratic	Debbie McCune-Davis (incumbent)	4,606	38.10%
Democratic	Jonathan Larkin	4,313	35.68%
Democratic	Mike Snitz	3,169	26.22%
Total votes		12,088	100.00%

General Election Results
Party	Candidate	Votes	%
Democratic	Debbie McCune-Davis (incumbent)	21,951	51.52%
Democratic	Jonathan Larkin	20,502	48.12%
Republican	Aaron Gidwani	157	0.37%
Total votes		42,610	100.00%
Democratic gain from Republican			
Democratic gain from Republican			

== See also ==
- 2012 United States elections
- 2012 United States presidential election in Arizona
- 2012 United States Senate election in Arizona
- 2012 United States House of Representatives elections in Arizona
- 2012 Arizona Senate election
- 51st Arizona State Legislature
- Arizona House of Representatives
