= 51st Arizona State Legislature =

Session of the Arizona Legislature

←	50th	52nd	→
- Arizona State Capitol (2014)

Overview
- Legislative body: Arizona State Legislature
- Jurisdiction: Arizona, United States
- Term: January 1, 2013 – December 31, 2014

Senate
- Members: 30
- President: Andy Biggs
- Temporary President: Gail Griffin
- Party control: Republican (16–14)

House of Representatives
- Members: 60
- Speaker: Andy Tobin
- Party control: Republican (36–24)

Sessions
- 1st: January 14 – June 14, 2013
- 2nd: January 13 – April 24, 2014

Special sessions
- 1st: June 11 – June 14, 2013
- 2nd: May 27 – May 29, 2014

The 51st Arizona State Legislature, consisting of the Arizona State Senate and the Arizona House of Representatives, was constituted in Phoenix from January 1, 2013, to December 31, 2014, during the last two years of Jan Brewer's first full term in office. Both the Senate and the House membership remained constant at 30 and 60, respectively. The Democrats gained five seats in the Senate, decreasing the Republican majority to 16–14. The Democrats also gained four seats in the lower chamber, leaving the Republicans with a 36–24 majority.

== Sessions ==
The Legislature met for two regular sessions at the State Capitol in Phoenix. The first opened on January 14, 2013, and adjourned on June 14, while the Second Regular Session convened on January 13, 2014, and adjourned sine die on April 24.

There were two Special Sessions, the first of which was convened on June 11, 2013, and adjourned on June 14; while the second convened on May 27, 2014, and adjourned sine die on May 29.

== State Senate ==
=== Members ===
The asterisk (*) denotes members of the previous Legislature who continued in office as members of this Legislature.

District	Senator	Party	Notes
1	Steve Pierce*	Republican	
2	Linda Lopez*	Democrat	Represented the 29th district in prior legislature
3	Olivia Cajero Bedford*	Democrat	Represented the 27th district in prior legislature
4	Lynne Pancrazi	Democrat	
5	Kelli Ward	Republican	
6	Chester Crandell	Republican	
7	Jack Jackson Jr.*	Democrat	Represented the 2nd district in prior legislature; resigned 7/12/2013
7	Carlyle Begay	Democrat	Appointed 7/31/2013
8	Barbara McGuire	Democrat	
9	Steve Farley	Democrat	
10	David Bradley	Democrat	
11	Al Melvin*	Republican	Represented the 26th district in prior legislature
12	Andy Biggs	Republican	Represented the 22nd district in prior legislature
13	Don Shooter	Republican	Represented the 24th district in prior legislature
14	Gail Griffin*	Republican	Represented the 5th district in prior legislature
15	Nancy Barto*	Republican	Represented the 7th district in prior legislature
16	Rich Crandall*	Republican	Represented the 19th district in prior legislature; resigned August 31, 2013
16	David C. Farnsworth	Republican	Appointed September 11, 2013
17	Steve Yarbrough*	Republican	Represented the 21st district in prior legislature
18	John McComish*	Republican	Represented the 20th district in prior legislature
19	Anna Tovar	Democrat	
20	Kimberly Yee	Republican	
21	Rick Murphy*	Republican	Represented the 9th district in prior legislature
22	Judy M. Burges	Republican	
23	Michelle Reagan*	Republican	Represented the 8th district in prior legislature
24	Katie Hobbs	Democrat	
25	Bob Worsley	Republican	
26	Ed Ableser	Democrat	
27	Leah Landrum Taylor*	Democrat	Represented the 16th district in prior legislature
28	Adam Driggs*	Republican	Represented the 11th district in prior legislature
29	Steve Gallardo*	Democrat	Represented the 13th district in prior legislature
30	Robert Meza*	Democrat	Represented the 14th district in prior legislature

== House of Representatives ==
=== Members ===
The asterisk (*) denotes members of the previous Legislature who continued in office as members of this Legislature.

District	Representative	Party	Notes
1	Karen Fann*	Republican	
1	Andy Tobin*	Republican	
2	Andrea Dalessandro	Democrat	
2	Rosanna Gabaldon	Democrat	
3	Sally Ann Gonzales*	Democrat	Represented district 27 in prior legislature
3	Macario Saldate*	Democrat	Represented district 27 in prior legislature
4	Juan Carlos Escamilla	Democrat	
4	Lisa Otondo	Democrat	
5	Sonny Borrelli	Republican	
5	Doris Goodale*	Republican	Represented district 3 in prior legislature
6	Brenda Barton	Republican	Represented district 5 in prior legislature
6	Bob Thorpe	Republican	
7	Albert Hale	Democrat	
7	Jamescita Peshlakai	Democrat	
8	Frank Pratt*	Republican	Represented district 23 in prior legislature
8	Thomas R. Shope Jr.	Republican	
9	Victoria Steele	Democrat	
9	Ethan Orr	Republican	
10	Stefanie Mach	Democrat	
10	Bruce Wheeler*	Democrat	Represented district 28 in prior legislature
11	Adam Kwasman	Republican	
11	Steve Smith	Republican	
12	Edwin W. Farnsworth*	Republican	Represented district 22 in prior legislature
12	Warren Petersen	Republican	
13	Darin Mitchell	Republican	
13	Steve B. Montenegro*	Republican	Represented district 12 in prior legislature
14	David M. Gowan Sr.*	Republican	Represented district 30 in prior legislature
14	David W. Stevens*	Republican	Represented district 25 in prior legislature
15	John Allen	Republican	
15	Heather Carter	Republican	Represented district 7 in prior legislature
16	Doug Coleman	Republican	
16	Kelly Townsend	Republican	
17	Tom Forese	Republican	
17	Javan D. Mesnard	Republican	Represented district 21 in prior legislature
18	Jeff Dial*	Republican	Represented district 20 in prior legislature
18	Bob Robson*	Republican	Represented district 20 in prior legislature
19	Mark A. Cardenas	Democrat	
19	Lupe C. Contreras	Democrat	
20	Paul Boyer	Republican	
20	Carl Seel	Republican	Represented district 6 in prior legislature
21	Rick Gray*	Republican	Represented district 9 in prior legislature
21	Debbie Lesko*	Republican	Represented district 9 in prior legislature
22	David Livingston	Republican	
22	Phil Lovas	Republican	
23	John Kavanagh*	Republican	Represented district 8 in prior legislature
23	Michelle Ugenti*	Republican	Represented district 8 in prior legislature
24	Lela Alston*	Democrat	Represented district 15 in prior legislature
24	Chad Campbell*	Democrat	Represented district 14 in prior legislature
25	Justin Olson*	Republican	Represented district 19 in prior legislature
25	Justin Pierce*	Republican	Represented district 19 in prior legislature
26	Juan Mendez	Democrat	
26	Andrew C. Sherwood*	Democrat	
27	Ruben Gallego*	Democrat	Represented district 16 in prior legislature
27	Catherine Miranda*	Democrat	Represented district 16 in prior legislature
28	Kate Brophy McGee*	Republican	Represented district 11 in prior legislature
28	Eric Meyer*	Democrat	Represented district 11 in prior legislature
29	Lydia Hernandez	Democrat	
29	Martin J. Quezada	Democrat	
30	Jonathan Larkin	Democrat	
30	Debbie McCune Davis*	Democrat	Represented district 14 in prior legislature
