= 2012 Arizona Senate election =

- November 6, 2012

All 30 seats of the Arizona Senate 16 seats needed for a majority
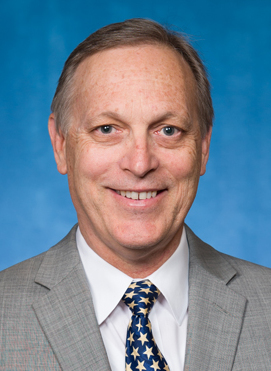

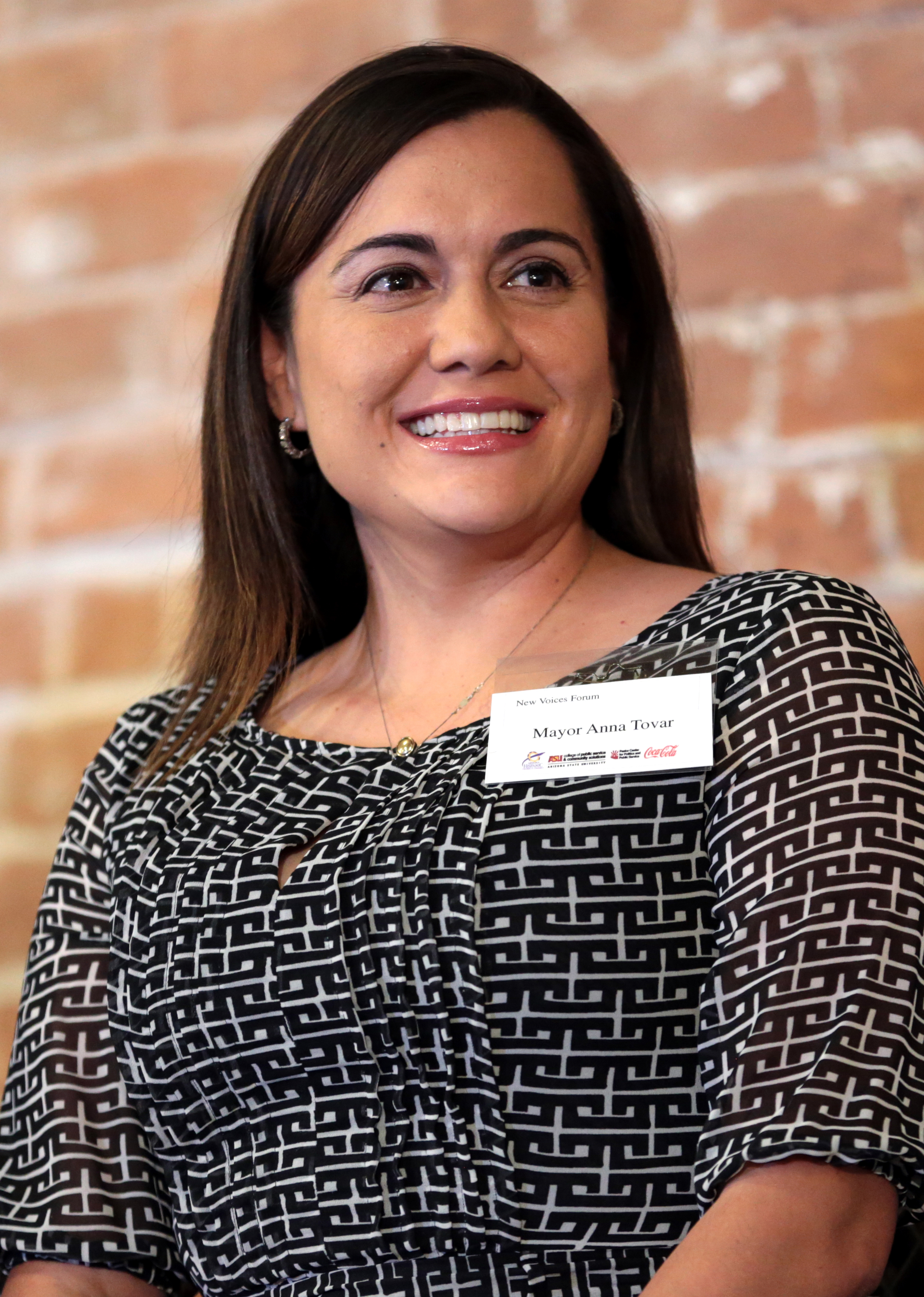
| | Majority party | Minority party |
|---|---|---|
| Leader | Andy Biggs | Anna Tovar (Note: On October 29, 2013, Democratic Senator Leah Landrum Taylor stepped down as Democratic Leader and was replaced by Anna Tovar as Democratic Leader.) |
| Party | Republican | Democratic |
| Leader's seat | 12th | 19th |
| Seats before | 21 | 9 |
| Seats after | 17 | 13 |
| Seat change | ▼4 | ▲4 |
| Popular vote | 1,068,468 | 828,981 |
| Percentage | 54.52% | 42.30% |
- Results: Democratic hold Democratic gain Republican hold
Senate President before election
Russell Pearce (Jan. 10, 2011 - Nov. 8, 2011)
Steve Pierce (Nov. 10, 2011 - Jan. 1, 2013)
Republican
Elected Senate President
Andy Biggs
Republican

The 2012 Arizona Senate election was held on November 6, 2012. Voters elected members of the Arizona Senate in all 30 of the state's legislative districts to serve a two-year term. These were the first elections following the 2010 redistricting cycle. Since passage of Proposition 106 in 2000, redistricting in Arizona is done by the Arizona Independent Redistricting Commission (AIRC). Following redistricting, many incumbents were moved into new districts. Primary elections were held on August 28, 2012.

Prior to the elections, the Republicans held a majority of 21 seats over the Democrats' nine seats.

Following the election, Republicans maintained control of the chamber with 17 Republicans to 13 Democrats, a net gain of four seats for Democrats.

The newly elected senators served in the 51st Arizona State Legislature.

== Recall Election ==
Republican Senate President Russell Pearce faced a recall election on November 8, 2011. For the first time in Arizona history, a member of the state legislature was ousted from the body in a recall. Fellow Republican Jerry Lewis defeated Pearce and took his seat in the Senate. (Note: Republican Jerry Lewis was elected in a Special Recall Election held November 8, 2011 and sworn in as Senator on November 22, 2011 after defeating recalled incumbent Republican Senator Russell Pearce.) Official election results here.

November 8, 2011 Special Recall Election - Legislative District 18
| Party | Candidate | Votes | % |
|---|---|---|---|
| Republican | Jerry Lewis | 12,812 | 55.20% |
| Republican | Russell Pearce (incumbent) | 10,121 | 43.61% |
| Withdrawn | Olivia Cortes | 277 | 1.19% |
| Total votes | | 23,210 | 100.00% |

== Retiring Incumbents ==
=== Democrats ===
1. District 15: David Lujan
2. District 17: David Schapira (Note: Ran for US Representative in Congressional District 9, but lost in the Democratic primary.)
3. District 28: Paula Aboud

=== Republicans ===
1. District 1: Lori Klein (Note: Redistricted from district 6 to 1.) (Note: Ran for State Representative in Legislative District 1, but lost in the Republican primary.)
2. District 3: Ron Gould (Note: Ran for US Representative in Congressional District 4, but lost in the Republican primary.)
3. District 5: Sylvia Tenney Allen
4. District 10: Linda Gray
5. District 11: Steve Smith (Note: Redistricted from district 23 to 11.) (Note: Ran for State Representative in Legislative District 11 and was elected.)

== Incumbent Defeated in Primary Elections ==
=== Republican ===
1. District 13: John Nelson (Note: Redistricted from district 12 to 13.)

== Incumbents Defeated in General Elections ==
=== Republicans ===
1. District 10: Frank Antenori (Note: Redistricted from district 30 to 10.)
2. District 26: Jerry Lewis (Note: Redistricted from district 18 to 26.) (Note: Republican Jerry Lewis was elected in a Special Recall Election held November 8, 2011 and sworn in as Senator on November 22, 2011 after defeating recalled incumbent Republican Senator Russell Pearce.)

== Predictions ==
| Source | Ranking | As of |
|---|---|---|
| Governing | Likely R | October 24, 2012 |

== Summary of Results by Arizona State Legislative District ==
| District | Incumbent | Party | Elected Senator | Outcome |
|---|---|---|---|---|
| 1st | Steve Pierce | Rep | Steve Pierce | Rep Hold |
| 2nd | Jack C. Jackson Jr. (Note: Redistricted from district 2 to 7.) (Note: Democrat Carlyle Begay was sworn in August 6, 2013 to replace Democratic Senator Jack C. Jackson Jr. who resigned on July 12, 2013.) | Dem | Linda Lopez (Note: Redistricted from district 29 to 2.) (Note: Democrat Andrea Dalessandro was sworn in January 22, 2014 to replace Democratic Senator Linda Lopez who resigned on January 13, 2014.) | Dem Hold |
| 3rd | Ron Gould | Rep | Olivia Cajero Bedford (Note: Redistricted from district 27 to 3.) | Dem Gain |
| 4th | Judy M. Burges (Note: Redistricted from district 4 to 22.) (Note: Republican Judy Burges was sworn in January 23, 2012 to replace Republican Senator Scott Bundgaard who resigned on January 6, 2012.) | Rep | Lynne Pancrazi | Dem Gain |
| 5th | Sylvia Tenney Allen | Rep | Kelli Ward | Rep Hold |
| 6th | Lori Klein | Rep | Chester Crandell (Note: Republican Alice Crandell, the widow of former Republican Senator Chester Crandell, was sworn in September 24, 2014 to replace her deceased husband who died on August 4, 2014.) | Rep Hold |
| 7th | Nancy Barto (Note: Redistricted from district 7 to 15.) | Rep | Jack C. Jackson Jr. | Dem Gain |
| 8th | Michele Reagan (Note: Redistricted from district 8 to 23.) | Rep | Barbara McGuire | Dem Gain |
| 9th | Rick Murphy (Note: Redistricted from district 9 to 21.) | Rep | Steve Farley | Dem Gain |
| 10th | Linda Gray | Rep | David Bradley | Dem Gain |
| 11th | Adam Driggs (Note: Redistricted from district 11 to 28.) | Rep | Al Melvin (Note: Redistricted from district 26 to 11.) | Rep Hold |
| 12th | John Nelson | Rep | Andy Biggs (Note: Redistricted from district 22 to 12.) | Rep Hold |
| 13th | Steve Gallardo (Note: Redistricted from district 13 to 29.) | Dem | Don Shooter (Note: Redistricted from district 24 to 13.) | Rep Gain |
| 14th | Robert Meza (Note: Redistricted from district 14 to 30.) | Dem | Gail Griffin (Note: Redistricted from district 25 to 14.) | Rep Gain |
| 15th | David Lujan (Note: Democrat David Lujan was sworn in January 12, 2012 to replace Democratic Senator Kyrsten Sinema who resigned on January 3, 2012.) | Dem | Nancy Barto | Rep Gain |
| 16th | Leah Landrum (Note: Redistricted from district 16 to 27.) | Dem | Rich Crandall (Note: Redistricted from district 19 to 16.) (Note: Republican Dave Farnsworth was sworn in September 12, 2013 to replace Republican Senator Rich Crandall who resigned on August 31, 2013.) | Rep Gain |
| 17th | David Schapira | Dem | Steve Yarbrough (Note: Redistricted from district 21 to 17.) | Rep Gain |
| 18th | Jerry Lewis | Rep | John McComish (Note: Redistricted from district 20 to 18.) | Rep Hold |
| 19th | Rich Crandall | Rep | Anna Tovar | Dem Gain |
| 20th | John McComish | Rep | Kimberly Yee | Rep Hold |
| 21st | Steve Yarbrough | Rep | Rick Murphy | Rep Hold |
| 22nd | Andy Biggs | Rep | Judy M. Burges | Rep Hold |
| 23rd | Steve Smith | Rep | Michele Reagan | Rep Hold |
| 24th | Don Shooter | Rep | Katie Hobbs | Dem Gain |
| 25th | Gail Griffin | Rep | Bob Worsley | Rep Hold |
| 26th | Al Melvin | Rep | Ed Ableser | Dem Gain |
| 27th | Olivia Cajero Bedford | Dem | Leah Landrum | Dem Hold |
| 28th | Paula Aboud | Dem | Adam Driggs | Rep Gain |
| 29th | Linda Lopez | Dem | Steve Gallardo | Dem Hold |
| 30th | Frank Antenori | Rep | Robert Meza | Dem Gain |

== Detailed Results ==
=== District 1 ===
Republican primary results
| Party | Candidate | Votes | % |
|---|---|---|---|
| Republican | Steve Pierce (incumbent) | 29,362 | 100.00% |
| Total votes | | 29,362 | 100.00% |

General election results
| Party | Candidate | Votes | % |
|---|---|---|---|
| Republican | Steve Pierce (incumbent) | 65,988 | 71.23% |
| Independent | Tom Rawles | 26,656 | 28.77% |
| Total votes | | 92,644 | 100.00% |
| Republican hold | | | |

=== District 2 ===
Democratic primary results
| Party | Candidate | Votes | % |
|---|---|---|---|
| Democratic | Linda Lopez (incumbent) | 12,613 | 100.00% |
| Total votes | | 12,613 | 100.00% |

General election results
| Party | Candidate | Votes | % |
|---|---|---|---|
| Democratic | Linda Lopez (incumbent) | 39,590 | 96.91% |
| Republican | Don Woolley (Note: Was a write-in candidate in the general election.) | 1,263 | 3.09% |
| Total votes | | 40,853 | 100.00% |
| Democratic hold | | | |

=== District 3 ===
Democratic primary results
| Party | Candidate | Votes | % |
|---|---|---|---|
| Democratic | Olivia Cajero Bedford (incumbent) | 9,718 | 66.84% |
| Democratic | Maria Garcia | 4,822 | 33.16% |
| Total votes | | 14,540 | 100.00% |

General election results
| Party | Candidate | Votes | % |
|---|---|---|---|
| Democratic | Olivia Cajero Bedford (incumbent) | 43,084 | 100.00% |
| Total votes | | 43,084 | 100.00% |
| Democratic gain from Republican | | | |

=== District 4 ===
Democratic primary results
| Party | Candidate | Votes | % |
|---|---|---|---|
| Democratic | Lynne Pancrazi | 7,043 | 100.00% |
| Total votes | | 7,043 | 100.00% |

Republican primary results
| Party | Candidate | Votes | % |
|---|---|---|---|
| Republican | Perla Inzunza (Note: Was a write-in candidate in the primary election.) | 37 | 100.00% |
| Total votes | | 37 | 100.00% |

General election results
| Party | Candidate | Votes | % |
|---|---|---|---|
| Democratic | Lynne Pancrazi | 29,823 | 100.00% |
| Total votes | | 29,823 | 100.00% |
| Democratic gain from Republican | | | |

=== District 5 ===
Democratic primary results
| Party | Candidate | Votes | % |
|---|---|---|---|
| Democratic | Beth Weisser | 5,092 | 100.00% |
| Total votes | | 5,092 | 100.00% |

Republican primary results
| Party | Candidate | Votes | % |
|---|---|---|---|
| Republican | Kelli Ward | 9,925 | 42.20% |
| Republican | Sam Scarmardo | 7,832 | 33.30% |
| Republican | Nancy McLain | 5,762 | 24.50% |
| Total votes | | 23,519 | 100.00% |

General election results
| Party | Candidate | Votes | % |
|---|---|---|---|
| Republican | Kelli Ward | 49,613 | 71.23% |
| Democratic | Beth Weisser | 20,040 | 28.77% |
| Total votes | | 69,653 | 100.00% |
| Republican hold | | | |

=== District 6 ===
Democratic primary results
| Party | Candidate | Votes | % |
|---|---|---|---|
| Democratic | Tom Chabin | 11,261 | 100.00% |
| Total votes | | 11,261 | 100.00% |

Republican primary results
| Party | Candidate | Votes | % |
|---|---|---|---|
| Republican | Chester Crandell | 17,089 | 100.00% |
| Total votes | | 17,089 | 100.00% |

General election results
| Party | Candidate | Votes | % |
|---|---|---|---|
| Republican | Chester Crandell | 45,105 | 53.04% |
| Democratic | Tom Chabin | 39,933 | 46.96% |
| Total votes | | 85,038 | 100.00% |
| Republican hold | | | |

=== District 7 ===
Democratic primary results
| Party | Candidate | Votes | % |
|---|---|---|---|
| Democratic | Jack C. Jackson Jr. (incumbent) | 19,642 | 100.00% |
| Total votes | | 19,642 | 100.00% |

General election results
| Party | Candidate | Votes | % |
|---|---|---|---|
| Democratic | Jack C. Jackson Jr. (incumbent) | 49,639 | 100.00% |
| Total votes | | 49,639 | 100.00% |
| Democratic gain from Republican | | | |

=== District 8 ===
Democratic primary results
| Party | Candidate | Votes | % |
|---|---|---|---|
| Democratic | Barbara McGuire | 8,646 | 100.00% |
| Total votes | | 8,646 | 100.00% |

Republican primary results
| Party | Candidate | Votes | % |
|---|---|---|---|
| Republican | Joe Ortiz | 8,265 | 100.00% |
| Total votes | | 8,265 | 100.00% |

Libertarian Primary Results
| Party | Candidate | Votes | % |
|---|---|---|---|
| Libertarian | Dean Dill | 26 | 100.00% |
| Total votes | | 26 | 100.00% |

General election results
| Party | Candidate | Votes | % |
|---|---|---|---|
| Democratic | Barbara McGuire | 25,026 | 48.94% |
| Republican | Joe Ortiz | 23,542 | 46.04% |
| Libertarian | Dean Dill | 2,570 | 5.03% |
| Total votes | | 51,138 | 100.00% |
| Democratic gain from Republican | | | |

=== District 9 ===
Democratic primary results
| Party | Candidate | Votes | % |
|---|---|---|---|
| Democratic | Steve Farley | 18,820 | 100.00% |
| Total votes | | 18,820 | 100.00% |

Republican primary results
| Party | Candidate | Votes | % |
|---|---|---|---|
| Republican | Tyler Mott | 15,746 | 100.00% |
| Total votes | | 15,746 | 100.00% |

General election results
| Party | Candidate | Votes | % |
|---|---|---|---|
| Democratic | Steve Farley | 49,818 | 55.74% |
| Republican | Tyler Mott | 39,562 | 44.26% |
| Total votes | | 89,380 | 100.00% |
| Democratic gain from Republican | | | |

=== District 10 ===
Democratic primary results
| Party | Candidate | Votes | % |
|---|---|---|---|
| Democratic | David Bradley | 18,139 | 100.00% |
| Total votes | | 18,139 | 100.00% |

Republican primary results
| Party | Candidate | Votes | % |
|---|---|---|---|
| Republican | Frank Antenori (incumbent) | 17,260 | 100.00% |
| Total votes | | 17,260 | 100.00% |

General election results
| Party | Candidate | Votes | % |
|---|---|---|---|
| Democratic | David Bradley | 48,509 | 54.69% |
| Republican | Frank Antenori (incumbent) | 40,193 | 45.31% |
| Total votes | | 88,702 | 100.00% |
| Democratic gain from Republican | | | |

=== District 11 ===
Democratic primary results
| Party | Candidate | Votes | % |
|---|---|---|---|
| Democratic | Jo Holt | 11,587 | 100.00% |
| Total votes | | 11,587 | 100.00% |

Republican primary results
| Party | Candidate | Votes | % |
|---|---|---|---|
| Republican | Al Melvin (incumbent) | 18,265 | 100.00% |
| Total votes | | 18,265 | 100.00% |

General election results
| Party | Candidate | Votes | % |
|---|---|---|---|
| Republican | Al Melvin (incumbent) | 48,367 | 56.38% |
| Democratic | Jo Holt | 37,428 | 43.62% |
| Total votes | | 85,795 | 100.00% |
| Republican hold | | | |

=== District 12 ===
Republican primary results
| Party | Candidate | Votes | % |
|---|---|---|---|
| Republican | Andy Biggs (incumbent) | 19,844 | 100.00% |
| Total votes | | 19,844 | 100.00% |

General election results
| Party | Candidate | Votes | % |
|---|---|---|---|
| Republican | Andy Biggs (incumbent) | 63,812 | 100.00% |
| Total votes | | 63,812 | 100.00% |
| Republican hold | | | |

=== District 13 ===
Democratic primary results
| Party | Candidate | Votes | % |
|---|---|---|---|
| Democratic | Terri Woodmansee | 181 | 100.00% |
| Total votes | | 181 | 100.00% |

Republican primary results
| Party | Candidate | Votes | % |
|---|---|---|---|
| Republican | Don Shooter (incumbent) | 10,509 | 64.90% |
| Republican | John Nelson (incumbent) | 5,683 | 35.10% |
| Total votes | | 16,192 | 100.00% |

General election results
| Party | Candidate | Votes | % |
|---|---|---|---|
| Republican | Don Shooter (incumbent) | 48,132 | 100.00% |
| Total votes | | 48,132 | 100.00% |
| Republican gain from Democratic | | | |

=== District 14 ===
Democratic primary results
| Party | Candidate | Votes | % |
|---|---|---|---|
| Democratic | Patricia V. Fleming | 12,101 | 100.00% |
| Total votes | | 12,101 | 100.00% |

Republican primary results
| Party | Candidate | Votes | % |
|---|---|---|---|
| Republican | Gail Griffin (incumbent) | 19,144 | 100.00% |
| Total votes | | 19,144 | 100.00% |

General election results
| Party | Candidate | Votes | % |
|---|---|---|---|
| Republican | Gail Griffin (incumbent) | 49,647 | 61.71% |
| Democratic | Patricia V. Fleming | 30,808 | 38.29% |
| Total votes | | 80,455 | 100.00% |
| Republican gain from Democratic | | | |

=== District 15 ===
Republican primary results
| Party | Candidate | Votes | % |
|---|---|---|---|
| Republican | Nancy Barto (incumbent) | 19,162 | 100.00% |
| Total votes | | 19,162 | 100.00% |

Libertarian Primary Results
| Party | Candidate | Votes | % |
|---|---|---|---|
| Libertarian | Dennis Grenier | 95 | 100.00% |
| Total votes | | 95 | 100.00% |

General election results
| Party | Candidate | Votes | % |
|---|---|---|---|
| Republican | Nancy Barto (incumbent) | 58,213 | 73.13% |
| Libertarian | Dennis Grenier | 21,384 | 26.87% |
| Total votes | | 79,597 | 100.00% |
| Republican gain from Democratic | | | |

=== District 16 ===
Democratic primary results
| Party | Candidate | Votes | % |
|---|---|---|---|
| Democratic | Scott Prior | 6,346 | 100.00% |
| Total votes | | 6,346 | 100.00% |

Republican primary results
| Party | Candidate | Votes | % |
|---|---|---|---|
| Republican | Rich Crandall (incumbent) | 9,493 | 52.43% |
| Republican | John Fillmore | 8,614 | 47.57% |
| Total votes | | 18,107 | 100.00% |

General election results
| Party | Candidate | Votes | % |
|---|---|---|---|
| Republican | Rich Crandall (incumbent) | 45,586 | 64.08% |
| Democratic | Scott Prior | 25,553 | 35.92% |
| Total votes | | 71,139 | 100.00% |
| Republican gain from Democratic | | | |

=== District 17 ===
Democratic primary results
| Party | Candidate | Votes | % |
|---|---|---|---|
| Democratic | Bill Gates | 7,523 | 100.00% |
| Total votes | | 7,523 | 100.00% |

Republican primary results
| Party | Candidate | Votes | % |
|---|---|---|---|
| Republican | Steve Yarbrough (incumbent) | 17,615 | 100.00% |
| Total votes | | 17,615 | 100.00% |

General election results
| Party | Candidate | Votes | % |
|---|---|---|---|
| Republican | Steve Yarbrough (incumbent) | 48,581 | 57.20% |
| Democratic | Bill Gates | 36,349 | 42.80% |
| Total votes | | 84,930 | 100.00% |
| Republican gain from Democratic | | | |

=== District 18 ===
Democratic primary results
| Party | Candidate | Votes | % |
|---|---|---|---|
| Democratic | Janie Hydrick | 11,944 | 100.00% |
| Total votes | | 11,944 | 100.00% |

Republican primary results
| Party | Candidate | Votes | % |
|---|---|---|---|
| Republican | John McComish (incumbent) | 17,874 | 100.00% |
| Total votes | | 17,874 | 100.00% |

General election results
| Party | Candidate | Votes | % |
|---|---|---|---|
| Republican | John McComish (incumbent) | 51,084 | 53.10% |
| Democratic | Janie Hydrick | 45,115 | 46.90% |
| Total votes | | 96,199 | 100.00% |
| Republican hold | | | |

=== District 19 ===
Democratic primary results
| Party | Candidate | Votes | % |
|---|---|---|---|
| Democratic | Anna Tovar | 5,782 | 100.00% |
| Total votes | | 5,782 | 100.00% |

General election results
| Party | Candidate | Votes | % |
|---|---|---|---|
| Democratic | Anna Tovar | 31,473 | 100.00% |
| Total votes | | 31,473 | 100.00% |
| Democratic gain from Republican | | | |

=== District 20 ===
Democratic primary results
| Party | Candidate | Votes | % |
|---|---|---|---|
| Democratic | Michael Powell | 7,877 | 100.00% |
| Total votes | | 7,877 | 100.00% |

Republican primary results
| Party | Candidate | Votes | % |
|---|---|---|---|
| Republican | Kimberly Yee | 15,519 | 100.00% |
| Total votes | | 15,519 | 100.00% |

General election results
| Party | Candidate | Votes | % |
|---|---|---|---|
| Republican | Kimberly Yee | 37,371 | 51.06% |
| Democratic | Michael Powell | 26,987 | 36.87% |
| Independent | Doug "Q" Quelland | 8,829 | 12.06% |
| Total votes | | 73,187 | 100.00% |
| Republican hold | | | |

=== District 21 ===
Democratic primary results
| Party | Candidate | Votes | % |
|---|---|---|---|
| Democratic | Michael Tarrats | 7,970 | 100.00% |
| Total votes | | 7,970 | 100.00% |

Republican primary results
| Party | Candidate | Votes | % |
|---|---|---|---|
| Republican | Rick Murphy (incumbent) | 16,706 | 100.00% |
| Total votes | | 16,706 | 100.00% |

General election results
| Party | Candidate | Votes | % |
|---|---|---|---|
| Republican | Rick Murphy (incumbent) | 44,369 | 59.59% |
| Democratic | Michael Tarrats | 30,087 | 40.41% |
| Total votes | | 74,456 | 100.00% |
| Republican hold | | | |

=== District 22 ===
Republican primary results
| Party | Candidate | Votes | % |
|---|---|---|---|
| Republican | Judy M. Burges (incumbent) | 23,902 | 100.00% |
| Total votes | | 23,902 | 100.00% |

General election results
| Party | Candidate | Votes | % |
|---|---|---|---|
| Republican | Judy M. Burges (incumbent) | 72,211 | 100.00% |
| Total votes | | 72,211 | 100.00% |
| Republican hold | | | |

=== District 23 ===
Republican primary results
| Party | Candidate | Votes | % |
|---|---|---|---|
| Republican | Michele Reagan (incumbent) | 28,532 | 100.00% |
| Total votes | | 28,532 | 100.00% |

General election results
| Party | Candidate | Votes | % |
|---|---|---|---|
| Republican | Michele Reagan (incumbent) | 82,278 | 100.00% |
| Total votes | | 82,278 | 100.00% |
| Republican hold | | | |

=== District 24 ===
Democratic primary results
| Party | Candidate | Votes | % |
|---|---|---|---|
| Democratic | Katie Hobbs | 7,234 | 61.19% |
| Democratic | Ken Cheuvront | 4,589 | 38.81% |
| Total votes | | 11,823 | 100.00% |

Republican primary results
| Party | Candidate | Votes | % |
|---|---|---|---|
| Republican | Augustine "Auggie" Bartning | 6,731 | 100.00% |
| Total votes | | 6,731 | 100.00% |

General election results
| Party | Candidate | Votes | % |
|---|---|---|---|
| Democratic | Katie Hobbs | 38,142 | 66.37% |
| Republican | Augustine "Auggie" Bartning | 19,326 | 33.63% |
| Total votes | | 57,468 | 100.00% |
| Democratic gain from Republican | | | |

=== District 25 ===
Democratic primary results
| Party | Candidate | Votes | % |
|---|---|---|---|
| Democratic | Greg Gadek | 7,005 | 99.97% |
| Democratic | Nick Thomas | 2 | 0.03% |
| Total votes | | 7,007 | 100.00% |

Republican primary results
| Party | Candidate | Votes | % |
|---|---|---|---|
| Republican | Bob Worsley | 17,200 | 55.96% |
| Republican | Russell Pearce | 13,534 | 44.04% |
| Total votes | | 30,734 | 100.00% |

General election results
| Party | Candidate | Votes | % |
|---|---|---|---|
| Republican | Bob Worsley | 55,290 | 66.61% |
| Democratic | Greg Gadek | 27,720 | 33.39% |
| Total votes | | 83,010 | 100.00% |
| Republican hold | | | |

=== District 26 ===
Democratic primary results
| Party | Candidate | Votes | % |
|---|---|---|---|
| Democratic | Ed Ableser | 6,835 | 100.00% |
| Total votes | | 6,835 | 100.00% |

Republican primary results
| Party | Candidate | Votes | % |
|---|---|---|---|
| Republican | Jerry Lewis (incumbent) | 6,810 | 100.00% |
| Total votes | | 6,810 | 100.00% |

Libertarian Primary Results
| Party | Candidate | Votes | % |
|---|---|---|---|
| Libertarian | Damian Trabel | 68 | 100.00% |
| Total votes | | 68 | 100.00% |

General election results
| Party | Candidate | Votes | % |
|---|---|---|---|
| Democratic | Ed Ableser | 26,051 | 54.00% |
| Republican | Jerry Lewis (incumbent) | 19,442 | 40.30% |
| Libertarian | Damian Trabel | 2,747 | 5.69% |
| Total votes | | 48,240 | 100.00% |
| Democratic gain from Republican | | | |

=== District 27 ===
Democratic primary results
| Party | Candidate | Votes | % |
|---|---|---|---|
| Democratic | Leah Landrum (incumbent) | 5,516 | 60.87% |
| Democratic | Victor Jett Contreras | 3,546 | 39.13% |
| Total votes | | 9,062 | 100.00% |

Republican primary results
| Party | Candidate | Votes | % |
|---|---|---|---|
| Republican | Sarah Coleman | 2,671 | 100.00% |
| Total votes | | 2,671 | 100.00% |

General election results
| Party | Candidate | Votes | % |
|---|---|---|---|
| Democratic | Leah Landrum (incumbent) | 33,137 | 76.23% |
| Republican | Sarah Coleman | 10,333 | 23.77% |
| Total votes | | 43,470 | 100.00% |
| Democratic hold | | | |

=== District 28 ===
Democratic primary results
| Party | Candidate | Votes | % |
|---|---|---|---|
| Democratic | Eric Shelley | 11,379 | 100.00% |
| Total votes | | 11,379 | 100.00% |

Republican primary results
| Party | Candidate | Votes | % |
|---|---|---|---|
| Republican | Adam Driggs (incumbent) | 20,247 | 100.00% |
| Total votes | | 20,247 | 100.00% |

General election results
| Party | Candidate | Votes | % |
|---|---|---|---|
| Republican | Adam Driggs (incumbent) | 49,160 | 55.61% |
| Democratic | Eric Shelley | 39,243 | 44.39% |
| Total votes | | 88,403 | 100.00% |
| Republican gain from Democratic | | | |

=== District 29 ===
Democratic primary results
| Party | Candidate | Votes | % |
|---|---|---|---|
| Democratic | Steve Gallardo (incumbent) | 5,710 | 100.00% |
| Total votes | | 5,710 | 100.00% |

General election results
| Party | Candidate | Votes | % |
|---|---|---|---|
| Democratic | Steve Gallardo (incumbent) | 27,931 | 100.00% |
| Total votes | | 27,931 | 100.00% |
| Democratic hold | | | |

=== District 30 ===
Democratic primary results
| Party | Candidate | Votes | % |
|---|---|---|---|
| Democratic | Robert Meza (incumbent) | 4,268 | 50.67% |
| Democratic | Raquel Terán | 4,155 | 49.33% |
| Total votes | | 8,423 | 100.00% |

General election results
| Party | Candidate | Votes | % |
|---|---|---|---|
| Democratic | Robert Meza (incumbent) | 27,485 | 100.00% |
| Total votes | | 27,485 | 100.00% |
| Democratic gain from Republican | | | |
