= Al Melvin =

Al Melvin may refer to:

- Allan Melvin (1923–2008), American character actor
- Al Melvin (politician) (born 1944), member of the Arizona State Senate
