= Douglas Coleman =

Douglas Coleman may refer to:

- Douglas L. Coleman (1931–2014), biochemist
- Douglas Coleman III (born 1998), American football safety

== See also ==
- Doug Coleman, American politician from Arizona
