= Randy Friese =

American politician

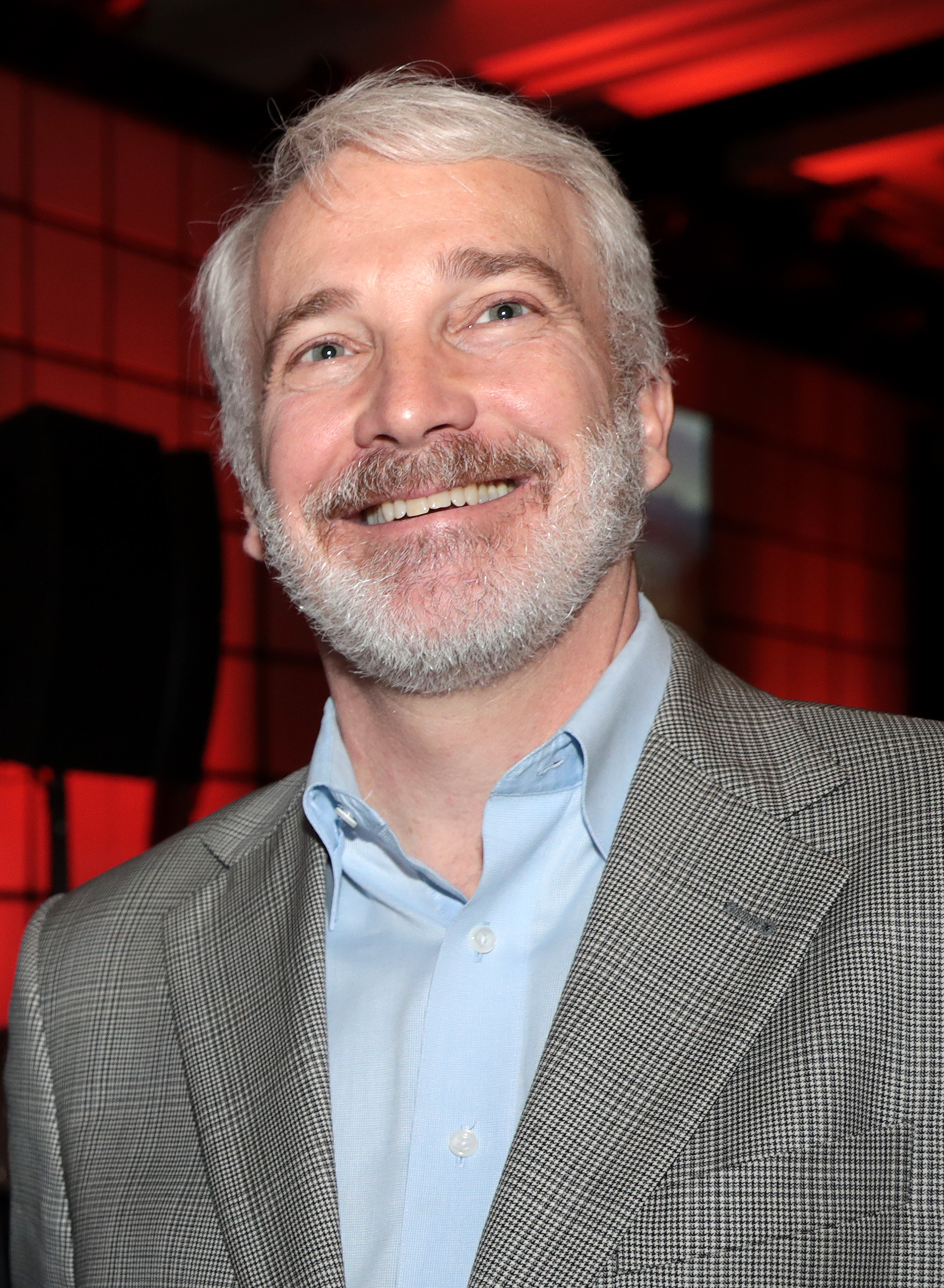
- Friese in 2020

Member of the Arizona House of Representatives from the 9th district
- In office January 5, 2015 – November 15, 2021
- Preceded by: Ethan Orr
- Succeeded by: Christopher Mathis

Personal details
- Born: Randall Scott Friese c.1964 (age 61–62) Baltimore, Maryland, U.S.
- Party: Democratic
- Spouse: Susan
- Education: University of Maryland, College Park (BS, MD); University of Texas (MS)

Military service
- Allegiance: United States
- Branch/service: United States Navy
- Years of service: 1997–2001
- Rank: Lieutenant commander
- Unit: Navy Medical Corps

Randall Scott Friese (born c. 1964) is an American surgeon and politician from the state of Arizona. A member of the Democratic Party, Friese served in the Arizona House of Representatives from 2015 through 2021, when he resigned to focus on his medical career.

== Education ==
Friese earned his Bachelor of Science degree in biochemistry from the University of Maryland, College Park in 1986. He received a medical degree from the University of Maryland School of Medicine in 1990 and a Master of Science in clinical sciences from the University of Texas Southwestern Graduate School in 2008.

== Career ==
From 1997 to 2001, Friese served in the United States Navy's Medical Corps. He left the service as a lieutenant commander.

Friese is a trauma surgeon, and he served as an Associate Professor of Surgery at the University of Arizona Medical Center. He now is a surgeon for Banner Health following the 2015 merger with UAHN. He treated Congresswoman Gabby Giffords and nine-year-old Christina Taylor-Green after they were shot in the 2011 Tucson shooting.

=== Arizona House of Representatives ===
Friese ran for the Arizona House of Representatives in District 9 as a member of the Democratic Party in the 2014 elections. He defeated Republican incumbent Ethan Orr by 0.12% of the vote.

On March 25, 2021, Friese announced he would run for the U.S. House of Representatives in Arizona's 2nd congressional district in the 2022 election. He ended his campaign on September 2, 2021, citing his commitment to practicing medicine during the COVID-19 pandemic, and resigned from the legislature effective November 15, 2021.
