= Ethan Orr =

American politician

Member of the Arizona House of Representatives from the 9th district
- In office January 14, 2013 – January 5, 2015 Serving with Victoria Steele
- Succeeded by: Randall Friese

Personal details
- Born: Tucson, Arizona
- Party: Republican
- Education: University of Arizona

Ethan Orr (born in Tucson, Arizona) is an American politician and a former Republican member of the Arizona House of Representatives. He represented District 9 from 2013 through 2015.

== Education ==
Orr earned his MPA from the University of Arizona.

== Elections ==
- 2012 With incumbent Republican Representatives Rick Gray and Debbie Lesko redistricted to District 21, Orr ran in the August 28, 2012 Republican Primary with a write-in candidate; Orr place first with 15,879 votes, and won the second seat in the November 6, 2012 General election with 42,626 votes above Democratic nominee Mohur Sidhwa, who had sought the District 28 seat in 2010.

Orr lost reelection to Randy Friese in the 2014 elections.
