= Rick Gray (Arizona politician) =

American politician

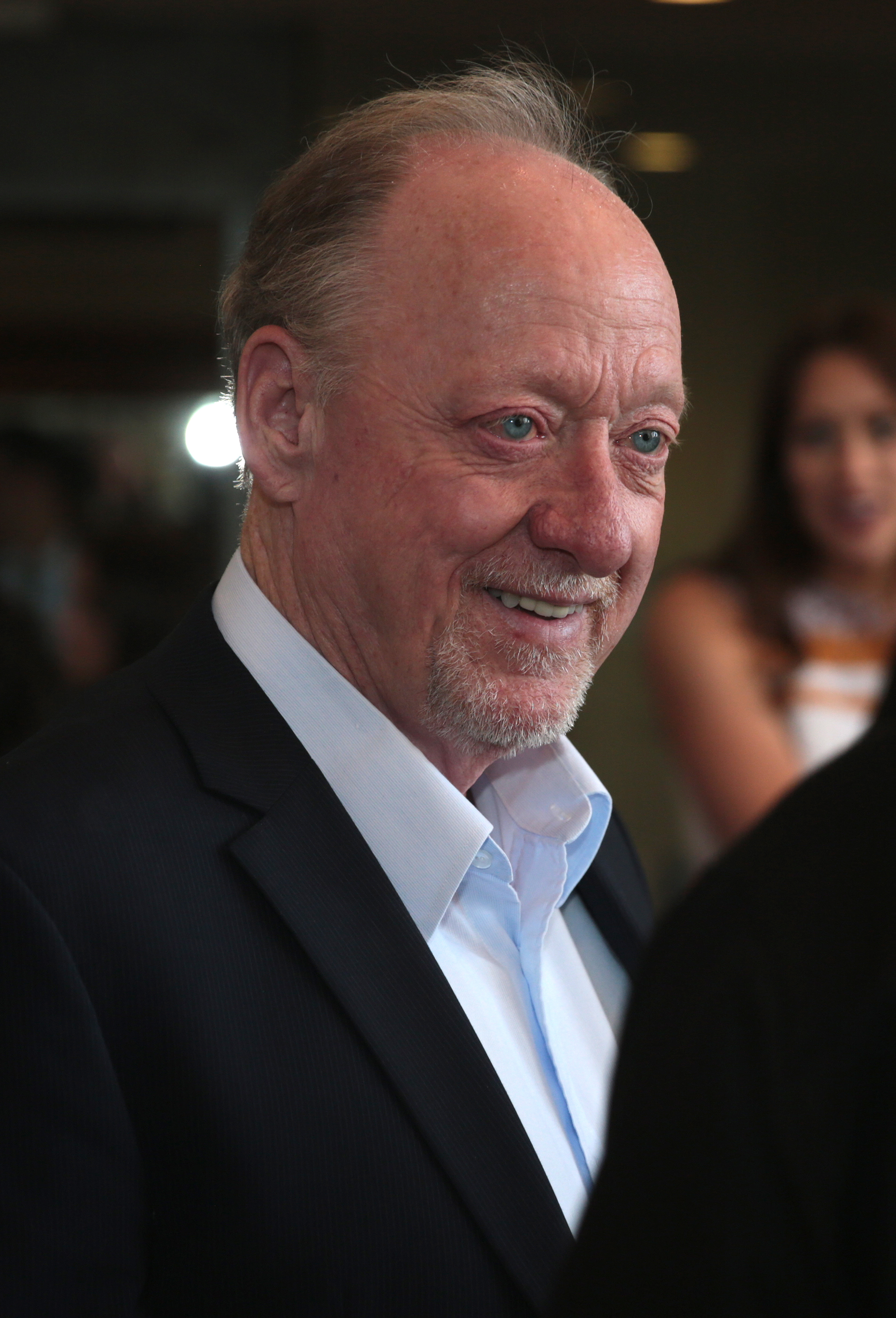
- Gray in 2018

Majority Leader of the Arizona Senate
- In office January 7, 2019 – January 9, 2023
- Preceded by: Kimberly Yee
- Succeeded by: Sonny Borrelli

Member of the Arizona Senate from the 21st district
- In office January 27, 2018 – January 9, 2023
- Preceded by: Debbie Lesko
- Succeeded by: Rosanna Gabaldón

Member of the Arizona House of Representatives from the 21st district
- In office January 14, 2013 – January 9, 2017
- Succeeded by: Kevin Payne

Member of the Arizona House of Representatives from the 9th district
- In office January 10, 2011 – January 14, 2013 Serving with Debbie Lesko
- Preceded by: Rick Murphy

Personal details
- Born: Omaha, Nebraska, U.S.
- Party: Republican
- Education: Grace University (BS)

Rick Gray (born in Omaha, Nebraska) is an American politician and former member of the Arizona Senate as well as a former Republican member of the Arizona House of Representatives representing District 21. Gray previously served consecutively from January 10, 2011, until January 14, 2013, in the District 9 seat. In 2016, Gray ran for the Arizona Corporation Commission seat Arizona Corporation Commission but placed fourth in the Republican primary. In 2018, Gray was appointed to fill the Arizona State Senate seat vacated by Debbie Lesko after she resigned to run for Congress. Gray would leave office on January 9, 2023.

== Early life and education ==
Gray was born and raised in Omaha, Nebraska. He earned his Bachelor of Science with a dual major in Organizational Leadership and Biblical Studies from Grace University in Omaha, Nebraska.

== Elections ==
- In 2010, when Republican Representative Rick Murphy ran for Arizona Senate and left a District 9 seat open, Gray ran alongside incumbent Republican Representative Debbie Lesko in the August 24, 2010 Republican Primary, placing second with 9,055 votes; in the November 2, 2010 general election, Lesko took the first seat, and Gray took the second seat with 28,459 votes against Democratic nominee Shirley McAllister, who had run for the seat in 2002.
- In 2012 Gray was redirected to District 21 with fellow incumbent Representative Debbie Lesko.With incumbent Representatives Thomas Forese and J. D. Mesnard redistricted to District 17, Lesko and Gray were unopposed for the August 28, 2012 Republican Primary; Lesko placed first, and Gray placed second with 12,515 votes; Gray won the five-way November 6, 2012 general election, with Lesko taking the first seat and Gray taking the second seat with 39,791 votes against Democratic nominees Carol Lokare, Sheri Van Horsen (who had run for Legislature seats in 2006, 2008, and 2010) and a Libertarian write-in candidate.
- In 2014 Gray and Tony Rivero were unopposed in the Republican primary. Gray and Rivero defeated Esther Duran Lumm in the general election. Republican Bryan Hackbarth was removed from the ballot before the primary, while Helmuth Hack (L) withdrew from the race. Gray received 29,589 votes.(PDF)
- In 2016, Gray ran for a seat on the Arizona Corporation Commission, alongside Andy Tobin and Al Melvin, but placed fourth in the Republican primary election.
- In 2018 Gray was appointed by the republican state senate to Debbie Lesko's seat when she resigned to run for Congress.
- In 2020 Gray ran unopposed for reelection to his District 21 seat and won Majority Leader of the Arizona Senate.

== Personal life ==
Gray is married to Lisa Gray and has four children. He resides in Sun City.

Arizona Senate
Preceded by Kimberly Yee	Majority Leader of the Arizona Senate; 2019–2023	Succeeded by Sonny Borrelli
