= Adam Kwasman =

American politician (born 1982)

Representative Adam Kwasman
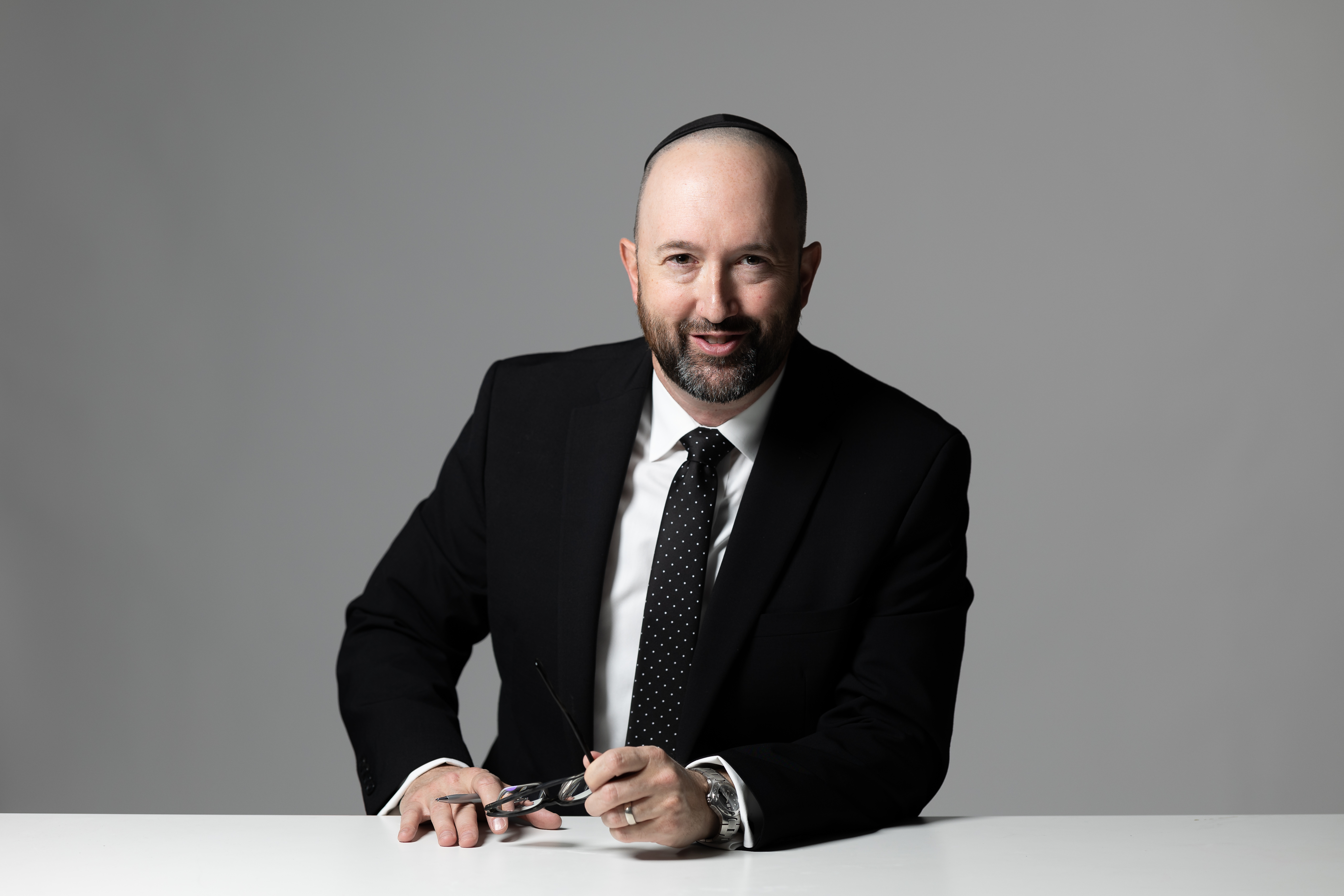

Member of the Arizona House of Representatives from the 11th legislative district
- In office 2013–2015 Serving with Steve Smith
- Succeeded by: Vince Leach

Personal details
- Born: October 28, 1982 (age 44) Tucson, Arizona, U.S.
- Party: Republican
- Spouse: Orit Kwasman
- Children: 4
- Education: George Mason University; Tulane University; Sandra Day O'Connor College of Law
- Occupation: Attorney
- Website: adamkwasman.com

Adam Kwasman (born October 28, 1982) is an American attorney, politician, and a Scottsdale City Council Member. He is also a former Republican member of the Arizona House of Representatives, representing District 11 from 2013 to 2015. Kwasman ran unsuccessfully for U.S. Congress in 2014. He lives in Scottsdale, Arizona.

== Early life and education ==
Kwasman was born and raised in Tucson, Arizona. He earned his bachelor's degree (Cum Laude) from Tulane University, a master's degree in Economics from George Mason University, and a J.D. degree from the Arizona State University Sandra Day O'Connor College of Law.

== Career ==
Kwasman interned on Capitol Hill for former Congressman Jim Kolbe. In 2009, Kwasman founded his own economic consulting firm advising both private companies and political clients.

From 2018 to 2023, Adam was a partner at Wagner & Kwasman, PLLC, where he successfully recovered millions of dollars for nearly a thousand personal injury clients, both pre-suit and in litigation.

In December 2023, Adam founded Kwasman Law, creating a boutique model firm that provides white-glove service for a select number of personal injury clients. Kwasman Law’s success has come directly from Adam’s client-focused, personal approach, coupled with his experience in maximizing financial recovery.

== Politics ==
Kwasman was elected to the Arizona House of Representatives in 2012 alongside Steve Smith defeating Democratic nominee Dave Joseph.

He served as the Vice Chairman on the Ways and Means Committee and also sat on the Appropriations and Commerce Committees.

=== Policy positions ===
Kwasman was given a 100% rating by the American Conservative Union in 2014. In 2013, Kwasman was rated "Hero of the Taxpayer" by Americans for Prosperity.

==== Illegal Migrant Stance ====
In 2014, Kwasman was attending a morning protest over the expected arrival of migrant children being transported to a shelter near Oracle, Arizona. Kwasman spoke with a local reporter and voiced his opposition to using state resources to aid illegal migrants. Kwasman later posted a tweet about the situation, and mistakenly used a photo of a school bus instead of the migrant bus.

=== 2014 CD1 Congressional Race ===
Kwasman placed third in the Republican primary in the formerly rural Arizona Congressional District 1 race, failing to break 30% of the vote in the Republican primary against Andy Tobin and Gary Kiehne.

=== 2020 State Senate Race ===
Kwasman announced his intention to run for the state senate in Legislative District 23, challenging incumbent republican Michelle Ugenti-Rita. Although he received sufficient signatures, Kwasman dropped out of the race and endorsed Alex Kolodin due to health concerns and the COVID-19 pandemic.

=== 2024 Scottsdale City Council Race ===
Kwasman ran for a seat on the Scottsdale City Council on a platform of family-focused policies, public safety, and fiscal accountability. He also highlighted his intention to alleviate the homelessness crisis in Scottsdale if elected.

Kwasman placed first in the general election for the Scottsdale City Council race and took office in January 2025.

=== Awards ===
During his time in the Legislature, Kwasman was awarded a number of honors by local organizations. He was awarded the "Hero of the Taxpayer" award by Americans for Prosperity, the "Champion of Small Business" award by the National Federation of Independent Businesses, and the "Friend of the Family Award" by the Arizona Family Project.

== Policies ==
Kwasman has stated that he has a strong commitment to public safety. His plan to ensure public safety includes investing in police, fostering community-police partnerships, and implementing comprehensive crime prevention strategies.

== Personal life ==
In August 2014, Kwasman revealed that he had been diagnosed with "a form of slow-growing blood cancer that has presented no symptoms."

Kwasman is a regular political and economic contributor to various national publications.

Kwasman is married to political consultant Orit Kwasman (née Sklar), who is the former Development Director of the Faith and Freedom Coalition and a conservative political consultant.

Kwasman practices orthodox Judaism and, along with his wife, is a leader of the Arizona chapter of the Republican Jewish Coalition. He was appointed to this position in 2023 and has worked to expand the Coalition's reach in Arizona and advance conservative Jewish ideals in the state legislature.

Kwasman is a leader and advocate for Invest in Israel Bonds for the state of Arizona.
