= Thomas Forese =

American politician

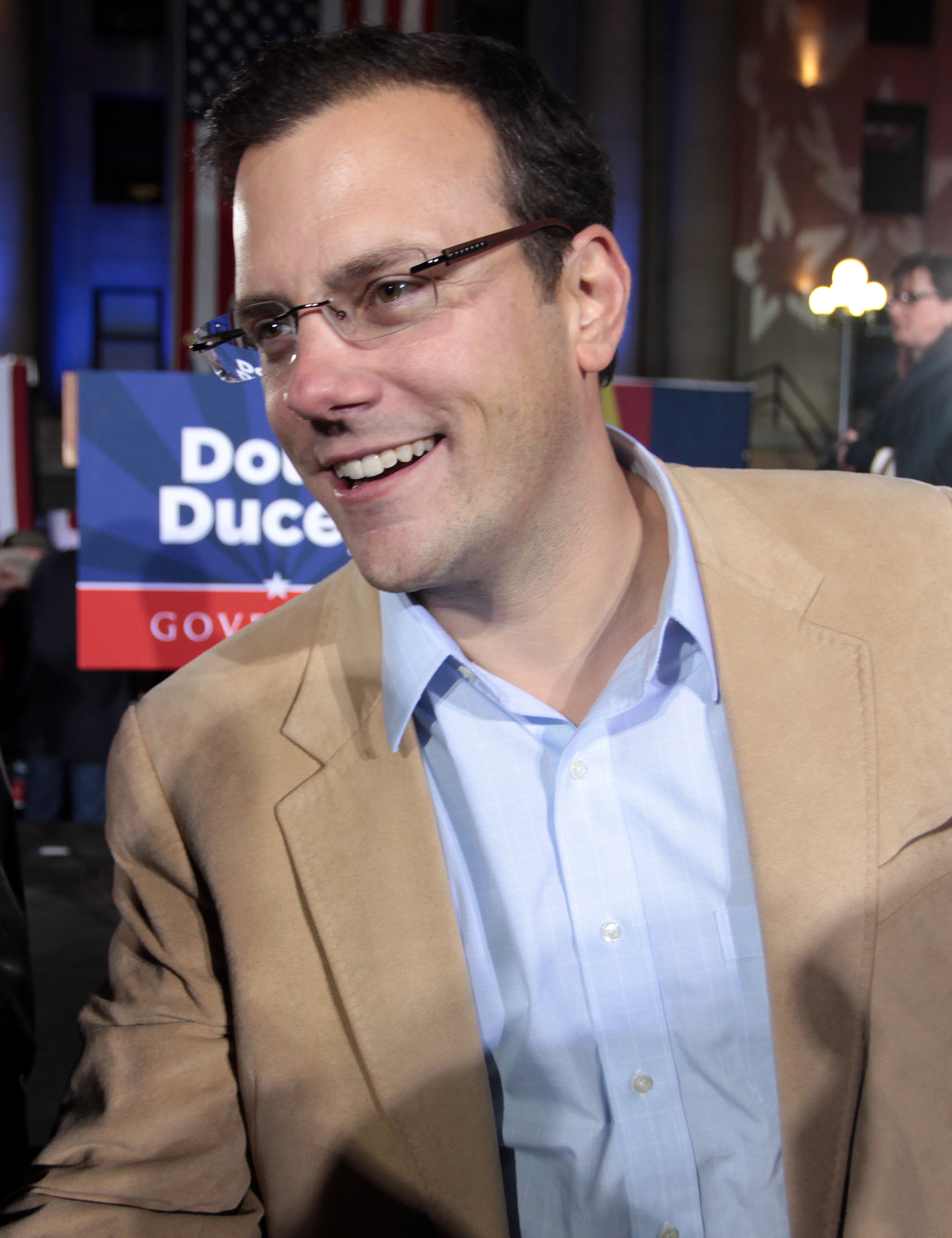
- Forese in 2014

Chair of the Arizona Corporation Commission
- In office January 5, 2015 – January 7, 2019
- Preceded by: Andy Tobin
- Succeeded by: Bob Burns

Member of the Arizona House of Representatives
- In office January 10, 2011 – January 5, 2015
- Preceded by: Warde Nichols; Steve Yarbrough
- Succeeded by: Jeff Weninger
- Constituency: 21st district (2011–2013); 17th district (2013–2015)

Personal details
- Born: Boston, Massachusetts
- Party: Republican
- Education: Brigham Young University–Idaho
- Website: foreseforarizona.com

Thomas Forese is an American politician, a Republican, and former chairman of the Arizona Corporation Commission. He was also in the Arizona House of Representatives representing District 17. Forese also previously served consecutively from January 10, 2011, until January 14, 2013, in the District 21 seat.

== Early life and education ==
Forese was born in Boston, Massachusetts and attended Brigham Young University–Idaho.

== Elections ==
Redistricted to District 17 with fellow incumbent Representative J. D. Mesnard, and with incumbent Democratic Representatives Ed Ableser running for Arizona Senate and Ben Arredondo leaving the Legislature, Forese and Mesnard were unopposed for the August 28, 2012 Republican Primary; Forese placed first with 13,974 votes, and Mesnard placed second; Forese and Mesnard won the four-way November 6, 2012 General election, with Forese taking the first seat with 44,422 votes and Mesnard taking the second seat ahead of Democratic nominee Karyn Lathan and a write-in candidate.

When District 21 incumbent Republican Representative Steve Yarbrough ran for Arizona Senate and Warde Nichols left the Legislature, Forese ran in the three-way August 24, 2010 Republican Primary, placing first with 13,379 votes; in the three-way November 2, 2010 General election, Forese took the first seat with 42,523 votes, and fellow Republican J. D. Mesnard took the second seat ahead of Green candidate Linda Macias.

In 2014, Forese ran for and won a seat on the Arizona Corporation Commission.

On September 14, 2016, Forese announced that he would run for State Treasurer of Arizona in the 2018 elections to succeed incumbent Jeff DeWit, who is not running for reelection. In April 2018, Forese withdrew from the race.
