= Phil Lovas =

American politician

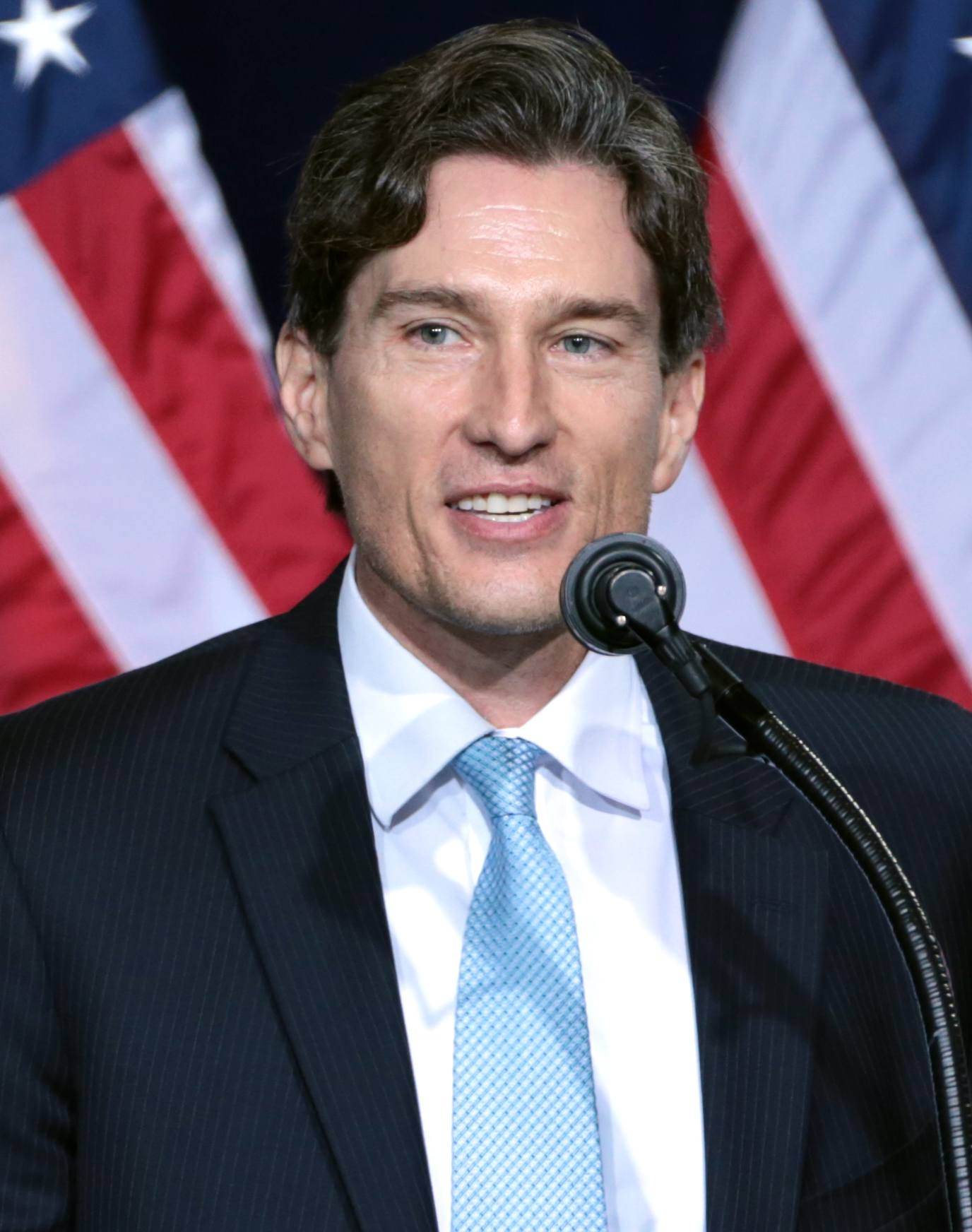

Member of the Arizona House of Representatives from the 22nd district
- In office January 14, 2013 – April 17, 2017
- Succeeded by: Ben Toma

Member of the Arizona House of Representatives from the 4th district
- In office February 21, 2012 – January 14, 2013 Serving with Jack Harper
- Preceded by: Judy Burges

Personal details
- Born: Ohio
- Party: Republican
- Website: lovasforarizona.com

Phil Lovas (born c. 1968 in Ohio) is an American politician and formerly a Republican member of the Arizona House of Representatives representing District 22. Lovas served consecutively in the District 4 seat from his appointment by the Maricopa County Board of Supervisors February 21, 2012 until January 14, 2013, to fill the vacancy caused by the resignation of Judy Burges to take the Arizona Senate District 4 seat.

Lovas served as the Arizona State Chairman of Republican presidential nominee Donald Trump's campaign.

In April 2017, Lovas became the Regional Advocate for the Small Business Administration's Office of Advocacy. He also unsuccessfully ran in the special election to replace U.S. Representative Trent Franks.

== Education ==
Lovas earned his bachelor's degree in journalism and his master's degree in political science.

== Elections ==
- 2014 Lovas and Livingston were unopposed in the Republican primary and won reelection against Democrats Larry Woods and Bonnie Boyce-Wilson, Independent Fred Botha and Americans Elect candidate Suzie Easter with Lovas winning 42,409 votes.
- 2012 With redistricting, the legislative District 4 mostly became District 22, and with incumbent Republican Representative (and Former State Senator) Jack W Harper deciding to not run for re-election to the Legislature, Lovas ran in the three-way race against David Livingston and Jeanette Dubreil on August 28, 2012, Republican Primary, placing first with 16,727 votes, and won the second seat in the November 6, 2012 General election with 58,700 votes above independent write-in candidate Pat White.
