= Juan Carlos Escamilla =

American politician

Member of the Arizona House of Representatives from the 4th district
- In office 2013–2015
- Preceded by: (redistricted)
- Succeeded by: Charlene Fernandez

Personal details
- Born: June 10, 1978 (age 48) Yakima, Washington
- Party: Democratic
- Spouse: Luz Robles
- Education: Arizona Western College

Juan Carlos Escamilla (born June 10, 1978) is a former state representative from Arizona, where he represented the 4th district. Escamilla was elected to the Arizona House of Representatives in 2013 after serving for six years as the mayor of San Luis, Arizona. He is a member of the Democratic Party.
