= Jerry Lewis (Arizona politician) =

Arizona politician

Member of the Arizona Senate from the 18th district
- In office November 22, 2011 – January 14, 2013
- Preceded by: Russell Pearce
- Succeeded by: John McComish

Personal details
- Born: c. 1956
- Party: Republican
- Spouse: Janet
- Children: 6
- Education: Brigham Young, B.S./M.S., accounting, 1982
- Occupation: Accountant; Charter school executive

Jerry H. Lewis (born 1956) is an American former politician who was a member of the Arizona Senate, representing Legislative District 18 (covering western and central Mesa and small section of the Salt River Pima-Maricopa Indian Community) from 2011 to 2013. He is a member of the Republican Party. He was elected to office by defeating incumbent Russell Pearce in a recall election November 8, 2011. In reaction to the election result, Pearce said, "If being recalled is the prize for keeping one's promises, then so be it"; and Lewis said, "We now have an opportunity to heal the divide in Mesa."

Lewis holds a master's degree from Brigham Young University.

Lewis is a Latter-day Saint who served as a missionary in Hong Kong. Lewis has also served as a bishop and stake president in the Church of Jesus Christ of Latter-day Saints. At the time of his election to the state senate he was serving as vice president of the Grand Canyon Council of the Boy Scouts of America.
