= Don Shooter =

American politician

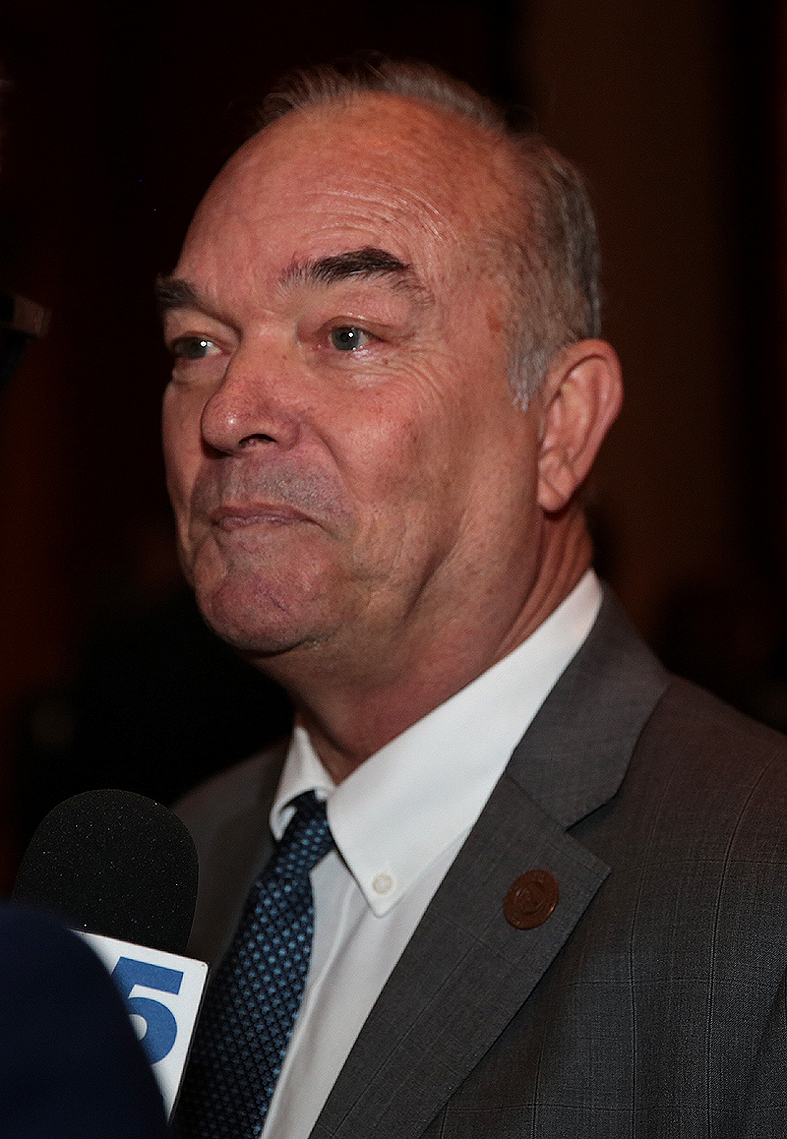
- Shooter in 2018

Member of the Arizona House of Representatives from the 13th district
- In office January 9, 2017 – February 1, 2018 Serving with Darin Mitchell
- Preceded by: Steve Montenegro
- Succeeded by: Tim Dunn

Member of the Arizona Senate from the 13th district
- In office January 14, 2013 – January 9, 2017
- Preceded by: Steve Gallardo
- Succeeded by: Steve Montenegro

Member of the Arizona Senate from the 24th district
- In office January 10, 2011 – January 14, 2013
- Preceded by: Amanda Aguirre
- Succeeded by: Katie Hobbs

Personal details
- Born: 1951 or 1952 (age 73–74)
- Party: Republican
- Education: University of Southern California
- Website: donshooter.com

Don Shooter is an American politician from Arizona. A Republican, Shooter was a member of the Arizona House of Representatives representing District 13 from January 14, 2017, until February 1, 2018, when he was expelled from the House after several women accused Shooter of sexual harassment.

Shooter is a former chair of the Yuma Tea Party. Shooter served as chairman of the powerful House Appropriations Committee, until November 2017, when he was suspended from the chairmanship amid the sexual harassment allegations.

== Education ==
Shooter attended the University of Southern California.

== Elections ==
- 2016 Shooter made a deal with termed-out Rep. Steve Montenegro (Republican from Litchfield Park, AZ) to "swap seats," with Montenegro running for and winning Shooter's Senate seat, and Shooter running for and winning Montenegro's House seat.
- 2012 Redistricted to District 13, and with incumbent Democratic Senator Steve Gallardo redistricted to District 29, Shooter won the August 28, 2012 Republican Primary with 10,509 votes, and was unopposed for the November 6, 2012 General election, winning with 48,132 votes after a Democratic write-in candidate did not qualify.
- 2010 To challenge incumbent District 24 Democratic Senator Amanda Aguirre, Shooter ran in the August 24, 2010, Republican Primary as a write-in candidate, qualifying with 1,599 votes, and won the November 2, 2010, general election with 18,334 votes (51.0%) against Senator Aguirre and Libertarian candidate Jack Kretzer.

== Legal troubles ==
In 2013, Shooter was charged by the Yuma city prosecutor with three misdemeanor counts (criminal trespass, disorderly conduct, and interference or disruption of an educational institution). The charges related to an incident in which Shooter charged into a charter school classroom and confronted a special education teacher about his grandson. Upon payment of $1,000 in restitution to the school and a $1,500 fee to the city, Shooter's prosecution was deferred on condition that he not violate any criminal law during the following year. Shooter denied knowledge of specifics, claiming he "didn't read all the details" of the agreement.

In 2013 Shooter filed a campaign finance report claiming $20,000 for fuel and mileage costs. In 2014 he filed an amended report to cut that amount in half.

== Sexual harassment claims and expulsion from the state House ==
In November 2017, multiple women came forward to accuse Shooter of sexual harassment. Representative Michelle Ugenti-Rita recalled an instance when he came to her office and asked her about her chest. Another time, she did not open her hotel door when he invited himself into her room with a six-pack of beer. State Representatives Wenona Benally and Athena Salman have also made public allegations against him. On November 7, Mi-Ai Parrish, publisher of the Arizona Republic, described sexual and racial comments made to her by Shooter. As of November 14, 2017, nine women have accused Shooter of sexual harassment.

On February 1, 2018, the Arizona House of Representatives voted 56–3 to expel Rep. Shooter. The House approved a resolution stating that "the House of Representatives finds that Representative Don Shooter's pattern of conduct was dishonorable and unbecoming of a member." This was the first occasion since 1991 that a member had been expelled from the Arizona Legislature.
