= Steve Smith (Arizona politician) =

American politician

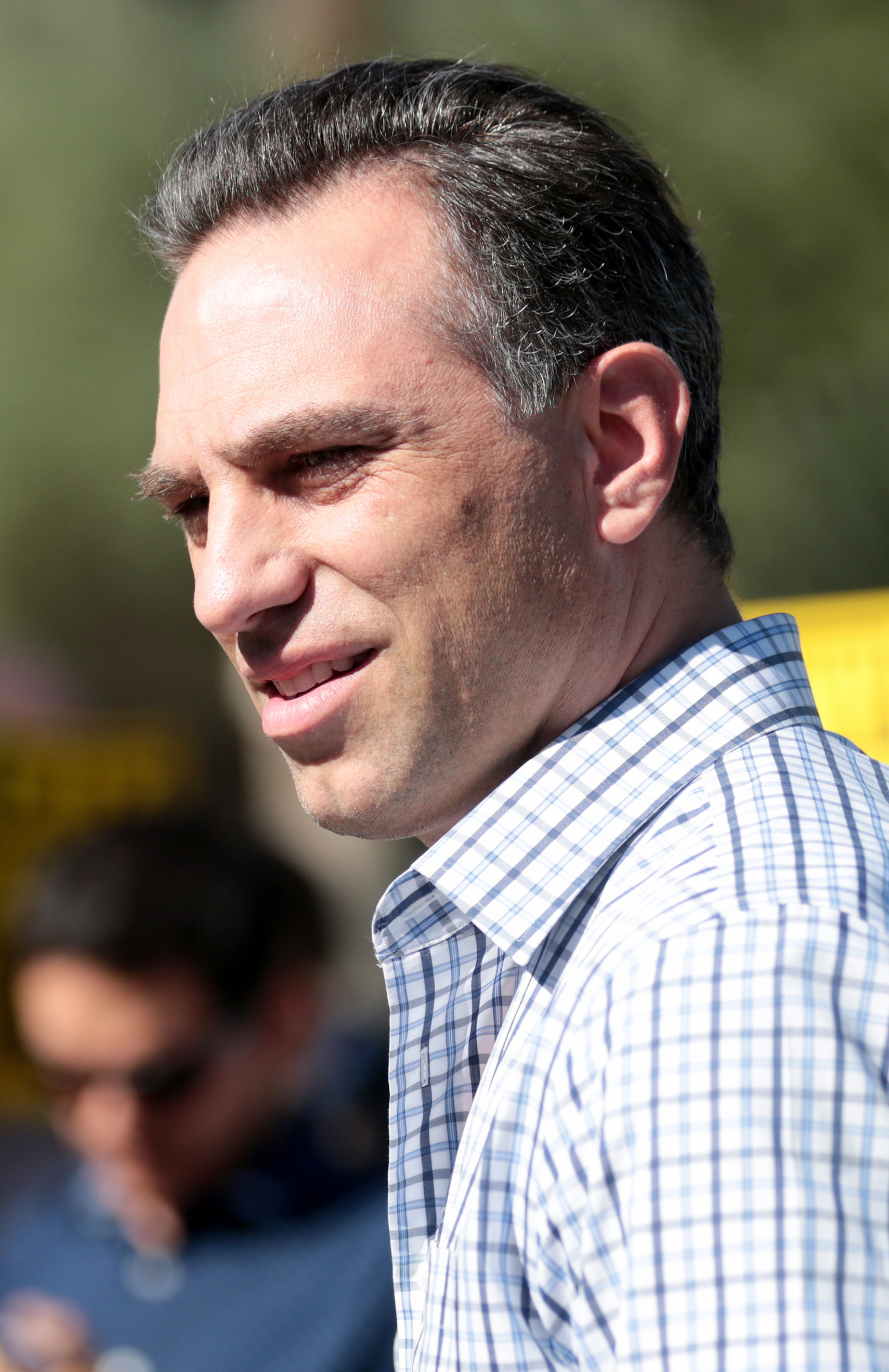
- Smith in 2017

Member of the Arizona Senate
- In office January 5, 2015 – January 14, 2019
- Preceded by: Al Melvin
- Succeeded by: Vince Leach
- Constituency: 11th district
- In office January 10, 2011 – January 14, 2013
- Preceded by: Rebecca Rios
- Succeeded by: Michele Reagan
- Constituency: 23rd district

Member of the Arizona House of Representatives from the 11th district
- In office January 14, 2013 – January 5, 2015 Serving with Adam Kwasman
- Succeeded by: Vince Leach

Personal details
- Party: Republican
- Education: Michigan State University (BA)

Steve Smith is an American politician and a former Republican member of the Arizona Senate representing District 11 since 2015 to 2019. He previously represented the 11th district in the House from 2013 to 2015, and District 23 seat in the Senate from 2011 to 2013. Steve is currently the Executive Director of the T.W Lewis Foundation located in Scottsdale, AZ.

== Early life and education ==
Smith was born in Detroit, Michigan. He earned his BA in marketing from Michigan State University. He moved to Arizona in 2001.

== Elections ==
In 2010, Smith challenged incumbent Democratic State Senator Rebecca Rios for the District 23 seat. Smith won the August 24, 2010, Republican primary with 11,719 votes (74.4%); and defeated Rios in the November 2, 2010, general election with 34,568 votes.

In 2012, incumbent Republican State Senator Michele Reagan was redistricted from District 8 and State Representatives Eric Meyer and Kate Brophy McGee were redistricted to District 28. Smith declared his candidacy for House District 11. In the August 28, 2012, Republican primary, he placed first with 16,201 votes, and won the three-way November 6, 2012, general election with 44,928 votes against Democratic nominee Dave Joseph.

In 2014, Smith defeated Democrat Jo Holton in the November 4 general election.

In 2016, Smith was unopposed in the Republican primary. He defeated Democratic nominee Ralph Atchue in the general election.

The Goldwater Institute gave him a 69% evaluation in 2013. The American Conservative Union gave him a 95% evaluation in 2017.

== Personal life ==
Smith is married to his wife Jamie, and they have five children. Smith is a Christian.

== Electoral history ==
2016 General Election for Arizona's 11th Senate District
Party	Candidate	Votes	%
Republican	Steve Smith	59,475	59.6%
Democratic	Ralph Atchue	40,390	40.4%

2014 General Election for Arizona's 11th Senate District
Party	Candidate	Votes	%
Republican	Steve Smith	38,397	59.1%
Democratic	Jo Holt	26,628	40.9%
