= Lynne Pancrazi =

American politician

Member of the Arizona Senate from the 4th district
- In office January 14, 2013 – January 9, 2017
- Preceded by: Scott Bundgaard
- Succeeded by: Lisa Otondo

Member of the Arizona House of Representatives from the 24th district
- In office January 2007 – January 14, 2013 Serving with Theresa Ulmer (2007–2009); Russ Jones (2009–2013)
- Preceded by: Amanda Aguirre

Personal details
- Party: Democratic
- Education: Arizona Western College; Point Loma Nazarene College; Northern Arizona University

Lynne Pancrazi is an American politician and a former Democratic member of the Arizona Senate representing District 4. Pancrazi served consecutively in the Arizona State Legislature from January 2007 until January 14, 2013, in the Arizona House of Representatives District 24 seat.

== Education ==
Pancrazi attended Arizona Western College, earned her BA in physical education from Point Loma Nazarene College (now Point Loma Nazarene University), and her MEd in elementary education from Northern Arizona University.

== Elections ==
- 2012 When Republican Senator Scott Bundgaard retired and left the Senate District 4 seat open; Pancrazi was unopposed for both the August 28, 2012 Democratic Primary, winning with 7,043 votes, and the November 6, 2012 General election, winning with 29,823 votes when a write-in candidate in the Republican Primary, did not qualify for the general election.
- 2006 When incumbent Democratic Representative Amanda Aguirre and incumbent Republican Representative Russ Jones both ran for Arizona Senate and left both House District 24 seats open, Pancrazi ran in the September 12, 2006 Democratic Primary, taking first place with 4,454 votes; in the five-way November 7, 2006 General election, Pancrazi took the first seat with 14,883 votes and fellow Democratic nominee Theresa Ulmer took the second seat ahead of Republican nominees Ken Rosevear, Joseph Melchionne, and Reform candidate Rodney Martin.
- 2008 Pancrazi and Representative Ulmer were unopposed for the September 2, 2008 Democratic Primary; Pancrazi placed first with 5,295 votes. In the three-way November 2, 2010 General election, Pancrazi took the first seat with 22,680 votes and Republican former Representative Russ Jones took the second seat ahead of incumbent Democratic Representative Ulmer.
- 2010 Pancrazi ran in the August 24, 2010 Democratic Primary and placed first with 5,624 votes; in the November 2, 2010 General election, incumbent Republican Representative Russ Jones took the first seat and Pancrazi took the second seat with 15,298 votes ahead of fellow Democratic nominee John Weil.
