= Chester Crandell =

American politician (1946–2014)

Member of the Arizona Senate from the 6th district
- In office January 14, 2013 – August 4, 2014
- Preceded by: Sylvia Allen
- Succeeded by: Alice Crandell (Interim)

Member of the Arizona House of Representatives from the 5th district
- In office January 10, 2011 – January 14, 2013 Serving with Brenda Barton

Personal details
- Born: June 19, 1946 Holbrook, Arizona
- Died: August 4, 2014 (aged 68) Heber, Arizona
- Party: Republican
- Education: University of Arizona; Northern Arizona University
- Website: electcrandell.com

Chester J. Crandell (June 19, 1946 – August 4, 2014) was an American politician and a Republican member of the Arizona Senate representing District 6 since January 14, 2013. Crandell served consecutively in the Arizona State Legislature from January 10, 2011, until January 14, 2013, in the Arizona House of Representatives District 5 seat.

Crandell, a fifth-generation rural Arizonan and rancher, had served in the Legislature since 2011.

== Education ==
Crandell was born in Holbrook, Arizona in 1946, and earned his BS in agricultural education from University of Arizona and his MEd in from Northern Arizona University.

== Elections ==
- 2012 Redistricted to District 6, and with incumbent Republican Senator Lori Klein redistricted to District 1, Crandell was unopposed for the Senate District 6 August 28, 2012 Republican Primary, winning with 17,089 votes; and won the November 6, 2012 General election with 45,105 votes against Democratic Representative Tom Chabin.
- 2010 With House District 5 incumbent Democratic Representative retiring and Republican Representative Bill Konopnicki running for Arizona Senate and leaving both seats open, Crandell ran in the three-way August 24, 2010 Republican Primary and placed second with 9,975 votes; in the four-way November 2, 2010 General election, fellow Republican nominee Brenda Barton took the first seat and Crandell took the second seat with 30,890 votes ahead of Democratic nominees Bill Shumway and Prescott Winslow.

== Sponsored legislation ==
In 2014, Crandell sponsored SB1093, which would have required federal law enforcement and other agencies doing business in an Arizona county to register with and present a warrant to the county sheriff. The proposed bill also stipulated that half of all fines imposed by the federal government must be turned over to Arizona's general fund. The bill was rejected by the Senate Rules Committee, which voted 4–2 against it after its attorney said that it would likely violate the Constitution. The American Conservative Union gave him an evaluation of 92%.

== Death ==
He was found dead August 4, 2014, after failing to return from a horseback ride near Heber-Overgaard. He was 68. According to the Navajo County Sheriff's Office, Crandell had left for a one-hour ride at about 10 A.M. on what investigators were told was a new colt. When he did not return, family members searched the area where he was riding, and, at about 2 P.M, found him dead. The horse was found in the area. After an autopsy, the cause of death was determined to be injuries from being thrown from his horse.
