= Doug Coleman =

American politician

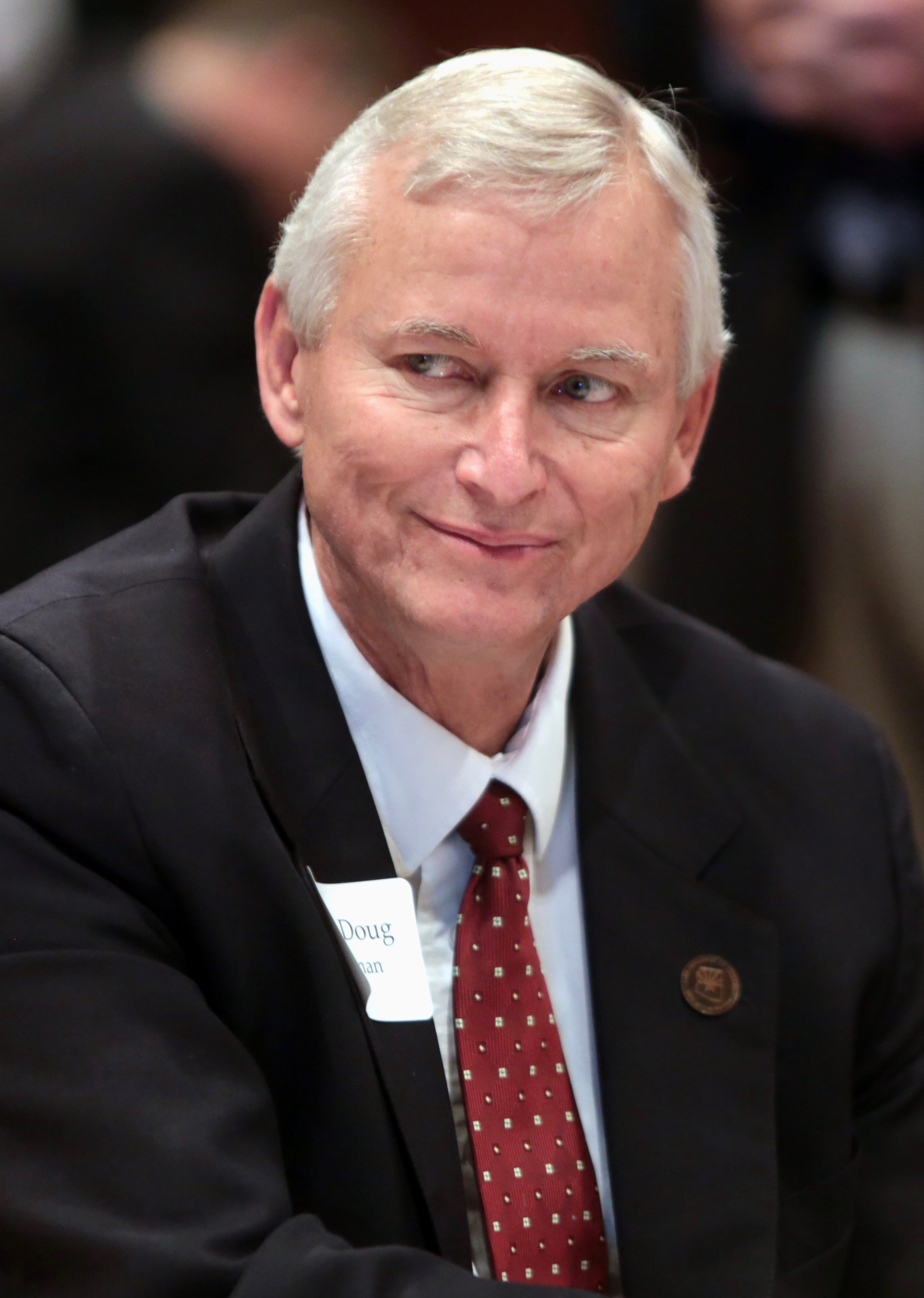
- Coleman in 2016

Member of the Arizona House of Representatives from the 16th district
- In office January 14, 2013 – January 14, 2019 Serving with Kelly Townsend
- Succeeded by: John Fillmore

Personal details
- Party: Republican
- Spouse: Roxanne Coleman
- Children: 6
- Education: Northern Arizona University
- Profession: Teacher
- Website: Campaign website

Doug Coleman is an American politician from Apache Junction, Arizona, who served as a member of the Arizona House of Representatives from January 2013 to January 2019. He also served as mayor of Apache Junction from 1995 to 2007 and was the first mayor of the city to be re-elected by the people.

== Early life ==
Coleman grew up in Mesa, Arizona and graduated from Westwood High School. He earned a Bachelor's degree in Business, Office, and Distributive Education from Arizona State University in 1981 and a Master's degree in Vocational Education from Northern Arizona University in 1989.

== Political career ==
Coleman began his political career in 1991 by serving on the Apache Junction City Council and after serving 4 years on City Council he was elected Mayor of Apache Junction in 1995. He was the first Mayor of Apache Junction to be re-elected by the voters and was re-elected 6 times. On January 31, 2012 Coleman resigned from City Council to run for the Arizona House of Representatives. Coleman served with Kelly Townsend as Arizona House of Representatives members from District 16 from 2013 to 2019.

=== Political Positions ===
Doug Coleman is a moderate Republican. The American Conservative Union gives him a lifetime 76% score and the Arizona chapter of the fiscally conservative Americans for Prosperity gave him a 52% rating. Coleman voted in favor of the state's Medicaid expansion. On social issues, he has mixed positions and ratings. Planned Parenthood, which is pro-choice on the issue of abortion, has given him a rating of 20% while the socially conservative Center for Arizona Policy gave him an 80% rating; NARAL Pro-Choice America gave him a 0% rating. On immigration, he voted against requiring stricter sentencing requirements for undocumented immigrants, but he did vote to establish a virtual border. He supports gun ownership rights and has voted to loosen gun restrictions. He had a 7% from the NRA Political Victory Fund in 2012, but received a higher "B+" grade and endorsement in 2014, and an "A" rating in 2016.

== Personal life ==
Coleman and his wife Roxanne have been married for 44 years. They have 6 daughters, 3 sons-in-law, and 20 grandchildren. He has also served in multiple volunteer positions for a local council of the Boy Scouts of America. Coleman is a member of the Church of Jesus Christ of Latter-day Saints.
