= Ed Ableser =

American politician

Ed Ableser "The Champ"

Member of the Arizona Senate from the 26th district
- In office January 14, 2013 – September 30, 2015
- Preceded by: Albert A. Melvin
- Succeeded by: Andrew Sherwood

Member of the U.S. House of Representatives from 's 17th district
- In office January 2007 – January 14, 2013

Personal details
- Born: Edward Zachary Ableser; March 16, 1978 (age 48) Tarzana, California, U.S.
- Party: Democratic
- Spouse: Hilary Heller
- Children: 3
- Education: Arizona State University
- Profession: Mental health counselor

Edward Zachary Ableser (born March 16, 1978) is a Democratic politician. He served in the Arizona Senate, representing the 26th district. His district included parts of Mesa, Tempe, and south Scottsdale. Previously he was a member of the Arizona House of Representatives. He resigned from public office in September 2015 to work in the Nevada Department of Education.

Ableser was appointed to fill the state senate term of former state senator Harry Mitchell and subsequently ran successfully for the Arizona House of Representatives. In 2012, he successfully ran for the Arizona Senate in the newly formed 26th district. Other notable positions include Assistant Pastor, Exchange Tempe Community. Worship-Service Producer, University Presbyterian Church, Member, League of Conservation Voters, 2004 City of Tempe Dr. Martin Luther King Jr. Diversity Award recipient.

== Personal life ==
He is an alumnus of Arizona State University, holding two bachelor's degrees in political science and Chinese, and a master's degree in Counseling Psychology. He graduated in May, 2014, with a PhD in Justice Studies from Arizona State University, and also owns and runs Ableser Family Counseling, a mental health counseling firm. On November 22, 2019 the Arizona Board of Behavioral Health Examiners and Ableser entered into a consent agreement to not practice counseling for five years due to not following professional standards.

On July 11, 2009, Ableser married Hilary Heller in Lake Tahoe, Nevada. Hilary's father is former Republican US Senator, Dean Heller, of Nevada. The couple have three children together: two daughters, Brielle and Ava, and a son, Zachary. The couple adopted Ava whom they adopted from an orphanage in China.
