= Al Melvin (politician) =

American politician

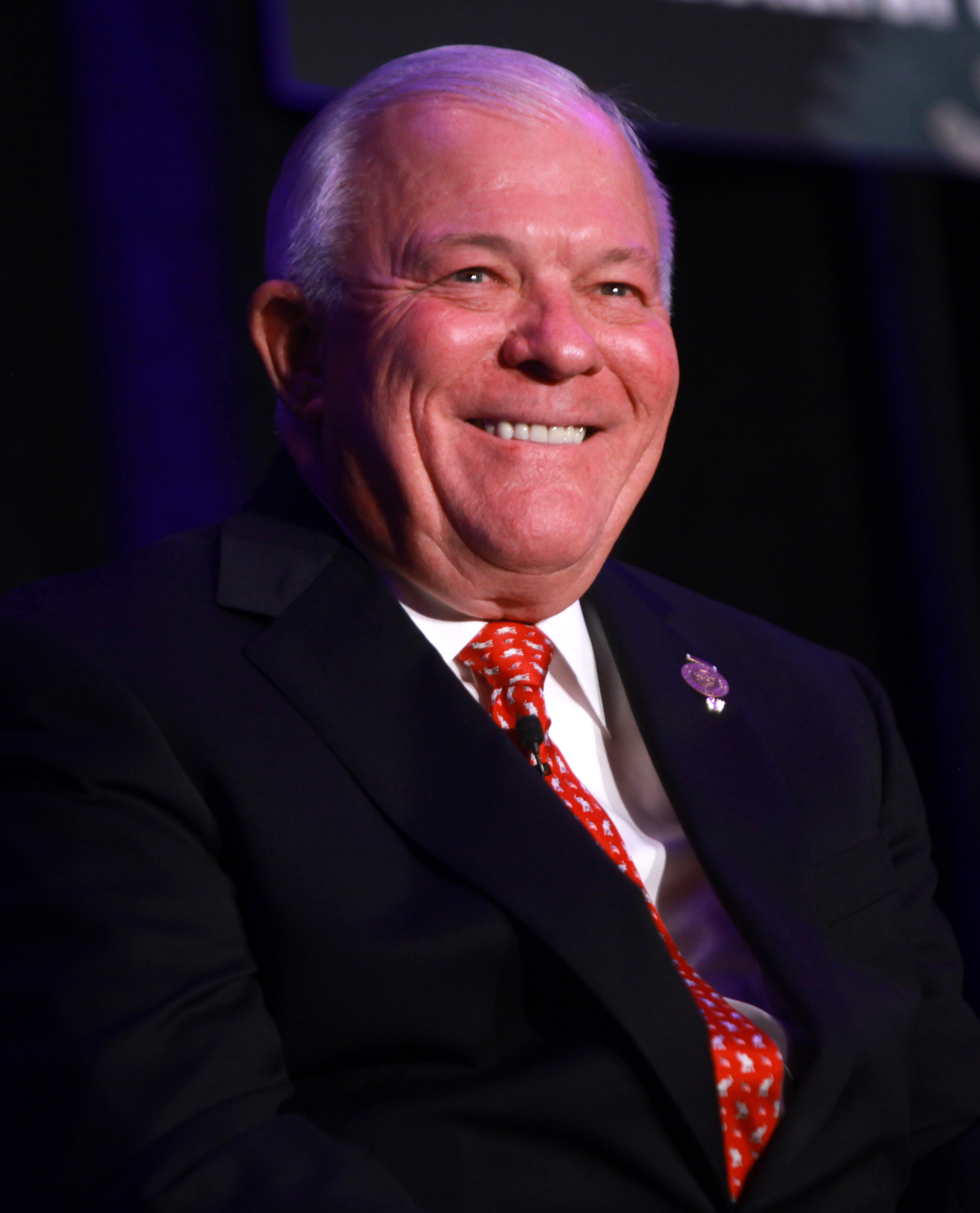
- Al Melvin speaking at an event in Phoenix, Arizona.

Member of the Arizona Senate from the 11th district
- In office January 14, 2013 – January 2015
- Preceded by: Linda M. Lopez
- Succeeded by: Steve Smith

Member of the Arizona Senate from the 26th district
- In office January 12, 2008 – January 14, 2013
- Preceded by: Charlene Pesquiera
- Succeeded by: Edward Z. Ableser

Personal details
- Born: Albert Anthony Melvin; November 3, 1944 (age 81) Helena, Montana, U.S.
- Party: Republican
- Spouse: Kou Marie
- Education: United States Merchant Marine Academy; American Graduate School; Naval War College

Military service
- Allegiance: United States
- Branch/service: United States Navy
- Years of service: 1969–1999
- Rank: Captain
- Unit: U.S. Naval Reserve

Albert Anthony Melvin (born November 3, 1944) is an American Republican politician who served in the Arizona Senate.

Melvin earned a Bachelor of Science degree in 1969 from the U.S. Merchant Marine Academy and earned his MBA from the American Graduate School in 1972. In 1994, he received his diploma from the U.S. Naval War College. He then served as a captain in the United States Navy, from 1997 to 1999 and a ship's officer for the American Maritime Officers (1999-2002). In 2002, he became a teacher for the University of Arizona and a consultant for the American Quality International Consulting. He served as a member of the Saddlebrook Republican Club, Pima County Republic Club, and the National Republican Committee.

Melvin ran for the Arizona Senate in 2006 in the 26th Legislative District, beating incumbent Republican Senator Toni Hellon in the primary but was defeated by Democratic candidate Charlene Pesquiera in the general election. He ran for the same seat again in 2008. Pesquiera did not seek re-election and Melvin beat Democratic candidate Cheryl Cage. He was re-elected in 2010. After Arizona redistricted its legislative districts in 2012, he decided to run for the new 11th Legislative District. His Democratic opponent was Jo Holt.

In April 2013, Melvin declared that he would seek the Republican nomination for governor of Arizona in 2014. He dropped out of the race in June 2014.

In February 2014, Melvin was interviewed by Anderson Cooper on CNN, regarding Melvin's support for Arizona SB 1062, which had been characterized as allowing religious people to discriminate against others (particularly members of the LGBT community), if their beliefs were offended by those other people.

In the same interview, he also stated that he was unaware of anyone in Arizona who practiced discrimination.

In the same month, he objected to the Common Core State Standards Initiative containing algebra, which he described as "'fuzzy math,' substituting letters for numbers in some examples."

In 2016, Melvin ran for a seat on the Arizona Corporation Commission, but lost the Republican primary, coming in last place.
