= 2006 Arizona House of Representatives election =

- November 7, 2006

All 60 seats in the Arizona House 31 seats needed for a majority
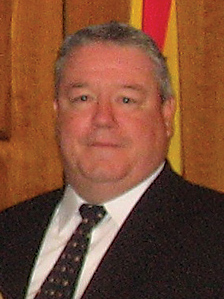

	Majority party	Minority party
Leader	Jim Weiers	Phil Lopes
Party	Republican	Democratic
Leader's seat	10th - Phoenix	27th - Tucson
Last election	38	22
Seats before	39 (Note: Representative Cheryl Chase was re-elected in 2004 as a Democrat; however, she changed political party affiliation to Republican on October 13, 2005.)	21
Seats after	33	27
Seat change	▼6	▲6
- Results: Democratic hold Democratic gain Republican hold
Speaker before election
Jim Weiers
Republican
Elected Speaker
Jim Weiers
Republican

The 2006 Arizona House of Representatives election took place on Tuesday, November 7, 2006, with the primary election held on Tuesday, September 12, 2006. Arizona voters elected all 60 members of the Arizona House of Representatives in multi-member districts to serve two-year terms.

The election coincided with United States national elections and Arizona state elections, including U.S. Senate, U.S. House, Arizona governor, and Arizona Senate.

Following the previous election in 2004, Republicans held a 38-to-22-seat majority over Democrats. During the legislative session, Representative Cheryl Chase switched political party affiliation from Democrat to Republican. Republicans maintained their majority in 2006, though the GOP majority narrowed to 33 seats. At 27 members, Democrats experienced a net gain of six seats. The newly elected members served in the 48th Arizona State Legislature, during which Republican Jim Weiers was re-elected as Speaker of the Arizona House. (Note: Jim Weiers was re-elected unopposed as Speaker for the 48th legislature.)

== Retiring incumbents ==
=== Democrats ===
1. District 14: Debbie McCune-Davis (Note: Elected to the Arizona State Senate.)
2. District 16: Leah Landrum Taylor (Note: Elected to the Arizona State Senate.)
3. District 17: Meg Burton Cahill (Note: Elected to the Arizona State Senate.)
4. District 24: Amanda Aguirre (Note: Elected to the Arizona State Senate.)
5. District 28: Ted Downing (Note: Ran for the Arizona State Senate, but was defeated in the Democratic primary by incumbent Paula Aboud.)

=== Republicans ===
1. District 1: Tom O'Halleran (Note: Elected to the Arizona State Senate.)
2. District 6: Ted Carpenter (Note: Ran for the Arizona State Senate, but was defeated in the Republican primary by Pamela Gorman.)
3. District 6: Pamela Gorman (Note: Elected to the Arizona State Senate.)
4. District 8: Colette Rosati (Note: Ran for the Arizona State Senate, but was defeated in the Republican primary by incumbent Carolyn S. Allen.)
5. District 11: Stephen Tully
6. District 19: Gary Pierce (Note: Elected to the Arizona Corporation Commission.)
7. District 23: Cheryl Chase (Note: Ran for the Arizona State Senate, but was defeated in the general election by Democratic incumbent Rebecca Rios.)
8. District 24: Russ Jones (Note: Ran for the Arizona State Senate, but was defeated in the general election by Democrat Amanda Aguirre.)
9. District 26: Steve Huffman (Note: Ran for the U.S. House in the 8th congressional district, but was defeated in the Republican primary by Randy Graf. Graf went on to lose the general election to Democrat Gabby Giffords.)

== Incumbent defeated in primary election ==
=== Republican ===
1. District 11: John Allen

== Incumbents defeated in general elections ==
=== Republicans ===
1. District 10: Doug Quelland
2. District 17: Laura Knaperek

== Predictions ==
Source	Ranking	As of
Rothenberg	Safe R	November 4, 2006

== Summary of results ==
Italics denote an open seat held by the incumbent party; bold text denotes a gain for a party.

District	Incumbent	Party	Elected representative	Outcome
1st	Lucy Mason	Rep	Lucy Mason	Rep hold
1st	Tom O'Halleran	Rep	Andy Tobin	Rep hold
2nd	Ann Kirkpatrick	Dem	Ann Kirkpatrick (Note: Democratic Representative Ann Kirkpatrick resigned her House seat on July 24, 2007. Thomas E. "Tom" Chabin (D) was appointed by the Coconino County Board of Supervisors to fill Ms. Kirkpatrick's unexpired term as Representative of District 2 on August 28, 2007 and was sworn in on September 10, 2007.)	Dem hold
2nd	Albert Tom	Dem	Albert Tom	Dem hold
3rd	Nancy G. McLain	Rep	Nancy G. McLain	Rep hold
3rd	Trish Groe	Rep	Trish Groe	Rep hold
4th	Tom Boone	Rep	Tom Boone	Rep hold
4th	Judy M. Burges	Rep	Judy M. Burges	Rep hold
5th	Bill Konopnicki	Rep	Bill Konopnicki	Rep hold
5th	Jack A. Brown	Dem	Jack A. Brown	Dem hold
6th	Ted Carpenter	Rep	Sam Crump	Rep hold
6th	Pamela Gorman	Rep	Doug Clark	Rep hold
7th	Ray Barnes	Rep	Ray Barnes	Rep hold
7th	Nancy K. Barto (Note: Republican Representative David Burnell Smith was removed from office on January 26, 2006. Nancy K. Barto (R) was appointed by the Maricopa County Board of Supervisors on February 3, 2006 to fill the vacancy in District 7.)	Rep	Nancy K. Barto	Rep hold
8th	Michele Reagan	Rep	Michele Reagan	Rep hold
8th	Colette Rosati	Rep	John Kavanagh	Rep hold
9th	Bob Stump	Rep	Bob Stump	Rep hold
9th	Richard A. "Rick" Murphy	Rep	Richard A. "Rick" Murphy	Rep hold
10th	Jim Weiers	Rep	Jim Weiers	Rep hold
10th	Doug Quelland	Rep	**Jackie Thrasher**	**Dem gain**
11th	Stephen Tully	Rep	Adam Driggs	Rep hold
11th	John Allen	Rep	**Mark DeSimone** (Note: Democratic Representative Mark DeSimone resigned his House seat on July 24, 2008. David E. Funkhouser III (D) was appointed by the Maricopa County Board of Supervisors to fill Mr. DeSimone's unexpired term as Representative of District 11 on August 20, 2008 and was sworn in on August 26, 2008.)	**Dem gain**
12th	John B. Nelson	Rep	John B. Nelson	Rep hold
12th	Jerry P. Weiers	Rep	Jerry P. Weiers	Rep hold
13th	Steve Gallardo	Dem	Steve Gallardo	Dem hold
13th	Martha Garcia	Dem	Martha Garcia	Dem hold
14th	Robert Meza	Dem	Robert Meza	Dem hold
14th	Debbie McCune-Davis	Dem	Chad Campbell	Dem hold
15th	Kyrsten Sinema	Dem	Kyrsten Sinema	Dem hold
15th	David M. Lujan	Dem	David M. Lujan	Dem hold
16th	Ben R. Miranda	Dem	Ben R. Miranda	Dem hold
16th	Leah Landrum	Dem	Cloves C. Campbell Jr.	Dem hold
17th	Meg Burton Cahill	Dem	Ed Ableser	Dem hold
17th	Laura Knaperek	Rep	**David Schapira**	**Dem gain**
18th	Russell K. Pearce	Rep	Russell K. Pearce	Rep hold
18th	Mark Anderson	Rep	Mark Anderson	Rep hold
19th	Kirk Adams (Note: Republican Representative Chuck Gray resigned his House seat and was sworn in as State Senator for District 19 on March 15, 2006. Kirk Adams (R) was appointed by the Maricopa County Board of Supervisors to fill Mr. Gray's unexpired term as Representative of District 19 on March 17, 2006.)	Rep	Kirk Adams	Rep hold
19th	Gary Pierce	Rep	Rich Crandall	Rep hold
20th	Bob Robson	Rep	Bob Robson	Rep hold
20th	John McComish	Rep	John McComish	Rep hold
21st	Steve Yarbrough	Rep	Steve Yarbrough	Rep hold
21st	Warde V. Nichols	Rep	Warde V. Nichols	Rep hold
22nd	Eddie Farnsworth	Rep	Eddie Farnsworth	Rep hold
22nd	Andy Biggs	Rep	Andy Biggs	Rep hold
23rd	Pete Rios	Dem	Pete Rios	Dem hold
23rd	Cheryl Chase	Rep	**Barbara McGuire**	**Dem gain**
24th	Amanda Aguirre	Dem	Lynne Pancrazi	Dem hold
24th	Russ Jones	Rep	**Theresa Ulmer**	**Dem gain**
25th	Manuel V. "Manny" Alvarez	Dem	Manuel V. "Manny" Alvarez	Dem hold
25th	Jennifer J. Burns	Rep	Jennifer J. Burns	Rep hold
26th	Pete Hershberger	Rep	Pete Hershberger	Rep hold
26th	Steve Huffman	Rep	**Lena S. Saradnik** (Note: Democratic Representative Lena S. Saradnik resigned her House seat on January 7, 2008. Nancy Young Wright (D) was appointed by the Pima County Board of Supervisors to fill Mrs. Saradnik's unexpired term as Representative of District 26 on January 18, 2008 and was sworn in on January 22, 2008.)	**Dem gain**
27th	Phil Lopes	Dem	Phil Lopes	Dem hold
27th	Olivia Cajero Bedford	Dem	Olivia Cajero Bedford	Dem hold
28th	David T. Bradley	Dem	David T. Bradley	Dem hold
28th	Ted Downing	Dem	Steve Farley	Dem hold
29th	Linda J. Lopez	Dem	Linda J. Lopez	Dem hold
29th	Tom Prezelski	Dem	Tom Prezelski	Dem hold
30th	Marian A. McClure	Rep	Marian A. McClure	Rep hold
30th	Jonathan Paton	Rep	Jonathan Paton	Rep hold

== Detailed results ==
Sources for election results:

=== District 1 ===
Primary election results
Party	Candidate	Votes	%
Republican Party primary results
Republican	Lucy Mason (incumbent)	11,879	39.18%
Republican	Andy Tobin	6,618	21.83%
Republican	Bryan Detwiler	6,576	21.69%
Republican	Noel Campbell	5,246	17.30%
Total votes		30,319	100.00%
Democratic Party primary results
Democratic	Wesley Edmonds	8,428	100.00%
Total votes		8,428	100.00%

General election results
Party	Candidate	Votes	%
Republican	Lucy Mason (incumbent)	39,402	34.62%
Republican	Andy Tobin	34,586	30.39%
Democratic	Wesley Edmonds	27,372	24.05%
Nonpartisan	George Seaman (Note: In official Arizona election results, the candidate's party affiliation is listed as "(GEORGE SEAMAN)" on the canvass of votes.)	12,437	10.93%
Total votes		113,797	100.00%
Republican hold			
Republican hold			

=== District 2 ===
Primary election results
Party	Candidate	Votes	%
Democratic Party primary results
Democratic	Ann Kirkpatrick (incumbent)	7,488	51.04%
Democratic	Albert Tom (incumbent)	7,184	48.96%
Total votes		14,672	100.00%
Republican Party primary results
Republican	Preston J. Korn	2,844	100.00%
Total votes		2,844	100.00%

General election results
Party	Candidate	Votes	%
Democratic	Ann Kirkpatrick (incumbent)	26,787	45.48%
Democratic	Albert Tom (incumbent)	22,863	38.82%
Republican	Preston J. Korn	9,247	15.70%
Total votes		58,897	100.00%
Democratic hold			
Democratic hold			

=== District 3 ===
Primary election results
Party	Candidate	Votes	%
Republican Party primary results
Republican	Trish Groe (incumbent)	7,958	34.32%
Republican	Nancy McLain (incumbent)	6,720	28.98%
Republican	Ray Cullison II	4,712	20.32%
Republican	Doris Goodale	3,798	16.38%
Total votes		23,188	100.00%
Democratic Party primary results
Democratic	Luis Lopez	5,552	100.00%
Total votes		5,552	100.00%

General election results
Party	Candidate	Votes	%
Republican	Trish Groe (incumbent)	24,447	36.81%
Republican	Nancy McLain (incumbent)	24,301	36.59%
Democratic	Luis Lopez	17,659	26.59%
Total votes		66,407	100.00%
Republican hold			
Republican hold			

=== District 4 ===
Primary election results
Party	Candidate	Votes	%
Republican Party primary results
Republican	Tom Boone (incumbent)	14,048	50.04%
Republican	Judy M. Burges (incumbent)	14,023	49.96%
Total votes		28,071	100.00%
Democratic Party primary results
Democratic	Debra Boehlke	8,789	93.60%
Democratic	Sue Dolphin (Note: The candidate ran a write-in campaign in this election.)	601	6.40%
Total votes		9,390	100.00%

General election results
Party	Candidate	Votes	%
Republican	Tom Boone (incumbent)	45,309	30.69%
Republican	Judy M. Burges (incumbent)	43,919	29.75%
Democratic	Debra Boehlke	30,702	20.80%
Democratic	Sue Dolphin	27,687	18.76%
Total votes		147,617	100.00%
Republican hold			
Republican hold			

=== District 5 ===
Primary election results
Party	Candidate	Votes	%
Republican Party primary results
Republican	Bill Konopnicki (incumbent)	10,180	100.00%
Total votes		10,180	100.00%
Democratic Party primary results
Democratic	Jack A. Brown (incumbent)	9,371	99.86%
Democratic	David Rodriguez (Note: Despite coming in second place in the Democratic primary as a write-in candidate, David Rodriguez did not advance to the general election.)	13	0.14%
Total votes		9,384	100.00%

General election results
Party	Candidate	Votes	%
Republican	Bill Konopnicki (incumbent)	29,393	53.84%
Democratic	Jack A. Brown (incumbent)	25,197	46.16%
Total votes		54,590	100.00%
Republican hold			
Democratic hold			

=== District 6 ===
Primary election results
Party	Candidate	Votes	%
Republican Party primary results
Republican	Sam Crump	5,193	30.53%
Republican	Doug Clark	4,893	28.76%
Republican	Clark Thomas	3,647	21.44%
Republican	Carl Seel	3,278	19.27%
Total votes		17,011	100.00%

General election results
Party	Candidate	Votes	%
Republican	Doug Clark	29,526	51.45%
Republican	Sam Crump	27,861	48.55%
Total votes		57,387	100.00%
Republican hold			
Republican hold			

=== District 7 ===
Primary election results
Party	Candidate	Votes	%
Republican Party primary results
Republican	Nancy Barto (incumbent)	7,218	38.67%
Republican	Ray Barnes (incumbent)	4,724	25.31%
Republican	David Burnell Smith	4,392	23.53%
Republican	Howard Sprague	2,331	12.49%
Total votes		18,665	100.00%
Democratic Party primary results
Democratic	Marilyn Fox	3,400	56.13%
Democratic	Jeanne Lunn	2,657	43.87%
Total votes		6,057	100.00%
Libertarian Party primary results
Libertarian	Jim Iannuzo	75	100.00%
Total votes		75	100.00%

General election results
Party	Candidate	Votes	%
Republican	Nancy Barto (incumbent)	29,952	29.74%
Republican	Ray Barnes (incumbent)	27,897	27.70%
Democratic	Marilyn Fox	21,143	20.99%
Democratic	Jeanne Lunn	19,601	19.46%
Libertarian	Jim Iannuzo	2,128	2.11%
Total votes		100,721	100.00%
Republican hold			
Republican hold			

=== District 8 ===
Primary election results
Party	Candidate	Votes	%
Republican Party primary results
Republican	Michele Reagan (incumbent)	11,302	35.81%
Republican	John Kavanagh	7,979	25.28%
Republican	James F. Burke	5,712	18.10%
Republican	Carolyn M. Schoenrock	3,854	12.21%
Republican	Travis Junion	2,717	8.61%
Total votes		31,564	100.00%
Democratic Party primary results
Democratic	Stephanie Rimmer	5,479	56.55%
Democratic	H. William Sandberg	4,209	43.45%
Total votes		9,688	100.00%

General election results
Party	Candidate	Votes	%
Republican	Michele Reagan (incumbent)	40,118	32.89%
Republican	John Kavanagh	35,260	28.90%
Democratic	Stephanie Rimmer	26,684	21.87%
Democratic	H. William Sandberg	19,931	16.34%
Total votes		121,993	100.00%
Republican hold			
Republican hold			

=== District 9 ===
Primary election results
Party	Candidate	Votes	%
Republican Party primary results
Republican	Bob Stump (incumbent)	10,958	53.37%
Republican	Rick Murphy (incumbent)	7,091	34.54%
Republican	David Fraley	2,483	12.09%
Total votes		20,532	100.00%
Democratic Party primary results
Democratic	Sheri Van Horsen	7,067	100.00%
Total votes		7,067	100.00%

General election results
Party	Candidate	Votes	%
Republican	Bob Stump (incumbent)	28,475	37.40%
Republican	Rick Murphy (incumbent)	24,208	31.79%
Democratic	Sheri Van Horsen	23,457	30.81%
Total votes		76,140	100.00%
Republican hold			
Republican hold			

=== District 10 ===
Primary election results
Party	Candidate	Votes	%
Republican Party primary results
Republican	James Weiers (incumbent)	5,401	51.50%
Republican	Doug Quelland (incumbent)	5,087	48.50%
Total votes		10,488	100.00%
Democratic Party primary results
Democratic	Jackie Thrasher	3,600	63.66%
Democratic	Lamont Lovejoy	2,055	36.34%
Total votes		5,655	100.00%

General election results
Party	Candidate	Votes	%
Republican	James Weiers (incumbent)	17,093	27.38%
Democratic	Jackie Thrasher	16,735	26.81%
Republican	Doug Quelland (incumbent)	16,504	26.44%
Democratic	Lamont Lovejoy	12,100	19.38%
Total votes		62,432	100.00%
Republican hold			
Democratic gain from Republican			

=== District 11 ===
Primary election results
Party	Candidate	Votes	%
Republican Party primary results
Republican	Adam Driggs	6,369	31.75%
Republican	Don Hesselbrock	6,165	30.74%
Republican	John Allen (incumbent)	5,548	27.66%
Republican	Devin Slayton	1,975	9.85%
Total votes		20,057	100.00%
Democratic Party primary results
Democratic	Mark Anthony Desimone	5,981	100.00%
Total votes		5,981	100.00%

General election results
Party	Candidate	Votes	%
Republican	Adam Driggs	29,505	34.58%
Democratic	Mark Anthony Desimone	28,470	33.37%
Republican	Don Hesselbrock	27,353	32.06%
Total votes		85,328	100.00%
Republican hold			
Democratic gain from Republican			

=== District 12 ===
Primary election results
Party	Candidate	Votes	%
Republican Party primary results
Republican	John Nelson (incumbent)	6,697	51.00%
Republican	Jerry Weiers (incumbent)	6,435	49.00%
Total votes		13,132	100.00%

General election results
Party	Candidate	Votes	%
Republican	John Nelson (incumbent)	32,493	52.36%
Republican	Jerry Weiers (incumbent)	29,560	47.64%
Total votes		62,053	100.00%
Republican hold			
Republican hold			

=== District 13 ===
Primary election results
Party	Candidate	Votes	%
Democratic Party primary results
Democratic	Martha Garcia (incumbent)	2,171	50.10%
Democratic	Steve Gallardo (incumbent)	2,162	49.90%
Total votes		4,333	100.00%

General election results
Party	Candidate	Votes	%
Democratic	Martha Garcia (incumbent)	10,642	52.02%
Democratic	Steve Gallardo (incumbent)	9,814	47.98%
Total votes		20,456	100.00%
Democratic hold			
Democratic hold			

=== District 14 ===
Primary election results
Party	Candidate	Votes	%
Democratic Party primary results
Democratic	Robert Meza (incumbent)	2,300	44.33%
Democratic	Chad Campbell	1,904	36.70%
Democratic	John M. Carpenter	984	18.97%
Total votes		5,188	100.00%
Republican Party primary results
Republican	John Stevens	1,558	100.00%
Total votes		1,558	100.00%
Libertarian Party primary results
Libertarian	Mike Renzulli	6	100.00%
Total votes		6	100.00%

General election results
Party	Candidate	Votes	%
Democratic	Robert Meza (incumbent)	8,172	38.24%
Democratic	Chad Campbell	7,560	35.38%
Republican	John Stevens	4,469	20.91%
Libertarian	Mike Renzulli	1,169	5.47%
Total votes		21,370	100.000%
Democratic hold			
Democratic hold			

=== District 15 ===
Primary election results
Party	Candidate	Votes	%
Democratic Party primary results
Democratic	Kyrsten Sinema (incumbent)	3,590	42.31%
Democratic	David Lujan (incumbent)	3,571	42.09%
Democratic	Robert Young	1,323	15.59%
Total votes		8,484	100.00%
Republican Party primary results
Republican	Robert Gear	3,004	92.29%
Republican	William Wheat	251	7.71%
Total votes		3,255	100.00%
Libertarian Party primary results
Libertarian	Richard Buck	15	100.00%
Total votes		15	100.00%

General election results
Party	Candidate	Votes	%
Democratic	David Lujan (incumbent)	15,951	33.12%
Democratic	Kyrsten Sinema (incumbent)	15,723	32.64%
Republican	Robert Gear	7,689	15.96%
Republican	William Wheat	7,305	15.17%
Libertarian	Richard Buck	1,499	3.11%
Total votes		48,167	100.00%
Democratic hold			
Democratic hold			

=== District 16 ===
Primary election results
Party	Candidate	Votes	%
Democratic Party primary results
Democratic	Ben R. Miranda (incumbent)	2,592	29.15%
Democratic	Cloves C. Campbell Jr.	2,262	25.44%
Democratic	Carlos Avelar	2,184	24.56%
Democratic	Betty Doss Ware	1,854	20.85%
Total votes		8,892	100.00%
Republican Party primary results
Republican	Robert (Bob) McPeek (Note: After winning the Republican primary, Robert (Bob) McPeek withdrew from the general election on 9/14/2006.)	1,190	53.27%
Republican	Daniel Coleman	1,044	46.73%
Total votes		2,234	100.00%

General election results
Party	Candidate	Votes	%
Democratic	Ben R. Miranda (incumbent)	13,182	41.18%
Democratic	Cloves C. Campbell Jr.	12,356	38.60%
Republican	Daniel Coleman	6,469	20.21%
Total votes		32,007	100.00%
Democratic hold			
Democratic hold			

=== District 17 ===
Primary election results
Party	Candidate	Votes	%
Democratic Party primary results
Democratic	Ed Ableser	4,385	33.73%
Democratic	David Schapira	3,621	27.85%
Democratic	Angie Crouse	2,955	22.73%
Democratic	Rhett Wilson	2,040	15.69%
Total votes		13,001	100.00%
Republican Party primary results
Republican	Laura Knaperek (incumbent)	5,621	40.09%
Republican	Dale Despain	3,658	26.09%
Republican	Chris DeRose	2,627	18.73%
Republican	Dan Gransinger	2,116	15.09%
Total votes		14,022	100.00%

General election results
Party	Candidate	Votes	%
Democratic	Ed Ableser	21,170	28.04%
Democratic	David Schapira	21,035	27.86%
Republican	Laura Knaperek (incumbent)	18,407	24.38%
Republican	Dale Despain	14,883	19.71%
Total votes		75,495	100.00%
Democratic hold			
Democratic gain from Republican			

=== District 18 ===
Primary election results
Party	Candidate	Votes	%
Republican Party primary results
Republican	Russell Pearce (incumbent)	6,274	52.86%
Republican	Mark Anderson (incumbent)	5,594	47.14%
Total votes		11,868	100.00%
Democratic Party primary results
Democratic	Tammie Pursley	2,345	100.00%
Total votes		2,345	100.00%

General election results
Party	Candidate	Votes	%
Republican	Mark Anderson (incumbent)	16,196	36.46%
Republican	Russell Pearce (incumbent)	15,139	34.08%
Democratic	Tammie Pursley	13,083	29.45%
Total votes		44,418	100.00%
Republican hold			
Republican hold			

=== District 19 ===
Primary election results
Party	Candidate	Votes	%
Republican Party primary results
Republican	Kirk Adams (incumbent)	9,281	50.73%
Republican	Rich Crandall	9,014	49.27%
Total votes		18,295	100.00%
Democratic Party primary results
Democratic	Lara Wibeto	4,333	100.00%
Total votes		4,333	100.00%

General election results
Party	Candidate	Votes	%
Republican	Rich Crandall	29,273	36.65%
Republican	Kirk Adams (incumbent)	28,288	35.41%
Democratic	Lara Wibeto	22,319	27.94%
Total votes		79,880	100.00%
Republican hold			
Republican hold			

=== District 20 ===
Primary election results
Party	Candidate	Votes	%
Republican Party primary results
Republican	Bob Robson (incumbent)	6,221	50.72%
Republican	John McComish (incumbent)	6,045	49.28%
Total votes		12,266	100.00%
Libertarian Party primary results
Libertarian	Jack Heald	7	100.00%
Total votes		7	100.00%

General election results
Party	Candidate	Votes	%
Republican	John McComish (incumbent)	29,531	42.58%
Republican	Bob Robson (incumbent)	26,963	38.88%
Libertarian	Jack Heald	12,857	18.54%
Total votes		69,351	100.00%
Republican hold			
Republican hold			

=== District 21 ===
Primary election results
Party	Candidate	Votes	%
Republican Party primary results
Republican	Steve Yarbrough (incumbent)	9,160	46.04%
Republican	Warde V. Nichols (incumbent)	6,971	35.04%
Republican	Donna Wallace	3,764	18.92%
Total votes		19,895	100.00%
Democratic Party primary results
Democratic	Phil Hettmansperger	4,285	100.00%
Total votes		4,285	100.00%

General election results
Party	Candidate	Votes	%
Republican	Steve Yarbrough (incumbent)	34,703	38.33%
Republican	Warde V. Nichols (incumbent)	28,353	31.31%
Democratic	Phil Hettmansperger	27,490	30.36%
Total votes		90,546	100.00%
Republican hold			
Republican hold			

=== District 22 ===
Primary election results
Party	Candidate	Votes	%
Republican Party primary results
Republican	Eddie Farnsworth (incumbent)	8,991	32.95%
Republican	Andy Biggs (incumbent)	7,793	28.56%
Republican	Terri Tobey	5,435	19.92%
Republican	Karl Kohlhoff	5,064	18.56%
Total votes		27,283	100.00%
Libertarian Party primary results
Libertarian	Edward Schwebel	11	100.00%
Total votes		11	100.00%

General election results
Party	Candidate	Votes	%
Republican	Eddie Farnsworth (incumbent)	38,817	41.26%
Republican	Andy Biggs (incumbent)	38,085	40.48%
Libertarian	Edward Schwebel	17,173	18.25%
Total votes		94,075	100.00%
Republican hold			
Republican hold			

=== District 23 ===
Primary election results
Party	Candidate	Votes	%
Democratic Party primary results
Democratic	Pete Rios (incumbent)	6,765	46.25%
Democratic	Barbara McGuire	4,096	28.00%
Democratic	Krista Pacion	3,765	25.74%
Total votes		14,626	100.00%
Republican Party primary results
Republican	Frank Pratt	4,172	52.90%
Republican	John Fillmore	3,715	47.10%
Total votes		7,887	100.00%

General election results
Party	Candidate	Votes	%
Democratic	Pete Rios (incumbent)	21,484	29.02%
Democratic	Barbara McGuire	18,050	24.39%
Republican	Frank Pratt	17,756	23.99%
Republican	John Fillmore	16,730	22.60%
Total votes		74,020	100.00%
Democratic hold			
Democratic gain from Republican			

=== District 24 ===
Primary election results
Party	Candidate	Votes	%
Democratic Party primary results
Democratic	Lynne Pancrazi	4,454	55.21%
Democratic	Theresa Ulmer	3,613	44.79%
Total votes		8,067	100.00%
Republican Party primary results
Republican	Ken Rosevear	4,415	53.14%
Republican	Joseph "Mel" Melchionne	3,894	46.86%
Total votes		8,309	100.00%

General election results
Party	Candidate	Votes	%
Democratic	Lynne Pancrazi	14,883	28.83%
Democratic	Theresa Ulmer	11,980	23.21%
Republican	Ken Rosevear	11,822	22.90%
Republican	Joseph "Mel" Melchionne	11,417	22.12%
Reform	Rodney Martin	1,516	2.94%
Total votes		51,618	100.00%
Democratic hold			
Democratic gain from Republican			

=== District 25 ===
Primary election results
Party	Candidate	Votes	%
Democratic Party primary results
Democratic	Manuel V. "Manny" Alvarez (incumbent)	9,376	55.84%
Democratic	Patricia Fleming	7,416	44.16%
Total votes		16,792	100.00%
Republican Party primary results
Republican	Gail Griffin	5,512	39.32%
Republican	Jennifer J. Burns (incumbent)	5,131	36.60%
Republican	Roger Condra	3,375	24.08%
Total votes		14,018	100.00%

General election results
Party	Candidate	Votes	%
Democratic	Manuel V. "Manny" Alvarez (incumbent)	21,476	27.14%
Republican	Jennifer J. Burns (incumbent)	19,302	24.39%
Democratic	Patricia Fleming	18,518	23.40%
Republican	Gail Griffin	18,498	23.37%
Nonpartisan	Bill Dore (Note: In official Arizona election results, the candidate's party affiliation is listed as "(BILL DORE)" on the canvass of votes.)	1,347	1.70%
Total votes		79,141	100.00%
Democratic hold			
Republican hold			

=== District 26 ===
Primary election results
Party	Candidate	Votes	%
Republican Party primary results
Republican	Pete Hershberger (incumbent)	8,885	29.90%
Republican	David A. Jorgenson	8,825	29.70%
Republican	Carol Somers	6,113	20.57%
Republican	Lisa Lovallo	5,894	19.83%
Total votes		29,717	100.00%
Democratic Party primary results
Democratic	Lena S. Saradnik	12,557	100.00%
Total votes		12,557	100.00%

General election results
Party	Candidate	Votes	%
Republican	Pete Hershberger (incumbent)	39,733	38.38%
Democratic	Lena S. Saradnik	34,520	33.35%
Republican	David A. Jorgenson	29,267	28.27%
Total votes		103,520	100.00%
Republican hold			
Democratic gain from Republican			

=== District 27 ===
Primary election results
Party	Candidate	Votes	%
Democratic Party primary results
Democratic	Olivia Cajero Bedford (incumbent)	7,639	55.55%
Democratic	Phil Lopes (incumbent)	6,113	44.45%
Total votes		13,752	100.00%
Republican Party primary results
Republican	Gene Chewning	3,913	100.00%
Total votes		3,913	100.00%

General election results
Party	Candidate	Votes	%
Democratic	Olivia Cajero Bedford (incumbent)	24,756	42.85%
Democratic	Phil Lopes (incumbent)	21,697	37.55%
Republican	Gene Chewning	11,327	19.60%
Total votes		57,780	100.00%
Democratic hold			
Democratic hold			

=== District 28 ===
Primary election results
Party	Candidate	Votes	%
Democratic Party primary results
Democratic	Steve Farley	8,715	33.23%
Democratic	David Bradley (incumbent)	8,675	33.08%
Democratic	Matt Heinz	6,075	23.17%
Democratic	Ted Prezelski	2,758	10.52%
Total votes		26,223	100.00%
Republican Party primary results
Republican	Bill Phillips	7,686	100.00%
Total votes		7,686	100.00%

General election results
Party	Candidate	Votes	%
Democratic	Steve Farley	30,941	39.01%
Democratic	David Bradley (incumbent)	30,575	38.55%
Republican	Bill Phillips	17,805	22.45%
Total votes		79,321	100.00%
Democratic hold			
Democratic hold			

=== District 29 ===
Primary election results
Party	Candidate	Votes	%
Democratic Party primary results
Democratic	Linda Lopez (incumbent)	5,244	41.32%
Democratic	Tom Prezelski (incumbent)	3,076	24.24%
Democratic	Betty Liggins	2,612	20.58%
Democratic	Patricia Anne Puig	1,760	13.87%
Total votes		12,692	100.00%
Republican Party primary results
Republican	Bruce P. Murchison	4,130	100.00%
Total votes		4,130	100.00%

General election results
Party	Candidate	Votes	%
Democratic	Linda Lopez (incumbent)	19,225	42.97%
Democratic	Tom Prezelski (incumbent)	14,756	32.98%
Republican	Bruce P. Murchison	10,763	24.05%
Total votes		44,744	100.00%
Democratic hold			
Democratic hold			

=== District 30 ===
Primary election results
Party	Candidate	Votes	%
Republican Party primary results
Republican	Jonathan Paton (incumbent)	11,496	33.29%
Republican	Marian Ann McClure (incumbent)	9,991	28.93%
Republican	David Gowan	7,017	20.32%
Republican	Frank Callegari	6,031	17.46%
Total votes		34,535	100.00%
Democratic Party primary results
Democratic	Clarence Boykins	13,934	100.00%
Total votes		13,934	100.00%

General election results
Party	Candidate	Votes	%
Republican	Marian Ann McClure (incumbent)	41,502	36.23%
Republican	Jonathan Paton (incumbent)	39,201	34.22%
Democratic	Clarence Boykins	33,864	29.56%
Total votes		114,567	100.00%
Republican hold			
Republican hold			

== See also ==
- 2006 United States elections
- 2006 United States Senate election in Arizona
- 2006 United States House of Representatives elections in Arizona
- 2006 Arizona elections
- 2006 Arizona gubernatorial election
- 2006 Arizona Senate election
- 48th Arizona State Legislature
- Arizona House of Representatives
