= 47th Arizona State Legislature =

Session of the Arizona Legislature

←	46th	48th	→
- Arizona State Capitol (2014)

Overview
- Legislative body: Arizona State Legislature
- Jurisdiction: Arizona, United States
- Term: January 1, 2005 – December 31, 2006

Senate
- Members: 30
- President: Ken Bennett
- Temporary President: Marilyn Jarrett
- Party control: Republican (18–12)

House of Representatives
- Members: 60
- Speaker: James P. Weiers
- Party control: Republican (39–21)

Sessions
- 1st: January 10 – May 13, 2005
- 2nd: January 9 – June 22, 2006

Special sessions
- 1st: January 24 – March 6, 2006

The 47th Arizona State Legislature, consisting of the Arizona State Senate and the Arizona House of Representatives, was constituted in Phoenix from January 1, 2005, to December 31, 2006, during the second two years of Janet Napolitano's first term in office. Both the Senate and the House membership remained constant at 30 and 60, respectively. The Republicans gained a seat in the Senate, giving them an 18–12 majority. The Republicans maintained their majority in the lower chamber, 39–21, while the Democrats picked up the sole seat held by an Independent.

== Sessions ==
The Legislature met for two regular sessions at the State Capitol in Phoenix. The first opened on January 10, 2005, and adjourned on May 13, while the Second Regular Session convened on January 9, 2006, and adjourned sine die on June 22.

There was a single Special Session, which convened on January 24, 2006, and adjourned sine die on March 6.

== State Senate ==
=== Members ===
The asterisk (*) denotes members of the previous Legislature who continued in office as members of this Legislature.

District	Senator	Party	Notes
1	Ken Bennett*	Republican	
2	Albert Hale	Democrat	
3	Ron Gould	Republican	
4	Jack W. Harper*	Republican	
5	Jake Flake	Republican	
6	Dean Martin*	Republican	
7	Jim Waring*	Republican	
8	Carolyn S. Allen*	Republican	
9	Robert Burns*	Republican	
10	Linda Gray	Republican	
11	Barbara Leff*	Republican	
12	Robert Blendu*	Republican	
13	Richard Miranda*	Democrat	
14	Bill Brotherton*	Democrat	
15	Ken Cheuvront*	Democrat	
16	Linda Aguirre*	Democrat	
17	Harry E. Mitchell*	Democrat	
18	Karen Johnson	Republican	
19	Marilyn Jarrett*	Republican	
20	John Huppenthal	Republican	
21	Jay Tibshraeny*	Republican	
22	Thayer Verschoor*	Republican	
23	Rebecca Rios	Democrat	
24	Robert Cannell*	Democrat	
25	Marsha Arzberger	Democrat	
26	Toni Hellon*	Republican	
27	Jorge Luis Garcia*	Democrat	
28	Gabrielle Giffords*	Democrat	
29	Victor Soltero*	Democrat	
30	Timothy S. Bee*	Republican	

== House of Representatives ==
=== Members ===
The asterisk (*) denotes members of the previous Legislature who continued in office as members of this Legislature.

District	Representative	Party	Notes
1	Lucy Mason*	Republican	
1	Tom O'Halleran*	Republican	
2	Ann Kirkpatrick	Democrat	
2	Albert Tom	Democrat	
3	Trish Groe	Republican	
3	Nancy McLain	Republican	
4	Tom Boone*	Republican	
4	Judy Burges	Republican	
5	Jack A. Brown	Democrat	
5	Bill Konopnicki	Republican	
6	Ted Carpenter*	Republican	
6	Pamela Gorman	Republican	
7	Ray Barnes*	Republican	
7	Nancy Barto	Republican	Replaced Smith on February 2, 2006
7	David Burnell Smith	Republican	Smith was removed from office on January 26, 2006
8	Michelle Reagan*	Republican	
8	Colette Rosati*	Republican	
9	Rick Murphy	Republican	
9	Bob Stump*	Republican	
10	Doug Quelland*	Republican	
10	James Weiers	Republican	
11	John Allen*	Republican	Represented District 7 in prior legislature
11	Stephen Tully*	Republican	
12	John B. Nelson*	Republican	
12	Jerry Weiers	Republican	
13	Steve Gallardo*	Democrat	
13	Martha Garcia	Democrat	
14	Debbie McCune Davis*	Democrat	
14	Robert Meza*	Democrat	
15	David Lujan	Democrat	
15	Kyrsten Sinema	Democrat	
16	Leah Landrum Taylor*	Democrat	
16	Ben R. Miranda*	Democrat	
17	Meg Burton Cahill*	Democrat	
17	Laura Knaperek	Republican	
18	Mark Anderson	Republican	
18	Russell Pearce*	Republican	
19	Chuck Gray*	Republican	
19	Gary L. Pierce*	Republican	
20	John McComish	Republican	
20	Bob Robson*	Republican	
21	Warde Nichols*	Republican	
21	Steven B. Yarbrough*	Republican	
22	Andy Biggs*	Republican	
22	Eddie Farnsworth*	Republican	
23	Cheryl Chase*	Republican	
23	Pete Rios	Democrat	
24	Amanda Aguirre*	Democrat	
24	Russell L. Jones	Republican	
25	Manuel Alvarez*	Democrat	
25	Jennifer Burns*	Republican	
26	J. Peter Hershberger*	Republican	
26	Steve Huffman*	Republican	
27	Olivia Cajero Bedford*	Democrat	
27	Phil Lopes*	Democrat	
28	David T. Bradley*	Democrat	
28	Ted Downing*	Democrat	
29	Linda J. Lopez*	Democrat	
29	Tom Prezelski*	Democrat	
30	Marian McClure*	Republican	
30	Jonathan Paton	Republican	
