= 48th Arizona State Legislature =

Session of the Arizona Legislature

←	47th	49th	→
- Arizona State Capitol (2014)

Overview
- Legislative body: Arizona State Legislature
- Jurisdiction: Arizona, United States
- Term: January 1, 2007 – December 31, 2008

Senate
- Members: 30
- President: Timothy S. Bee
- Temporary President: Robert Blendu
- Party control: Republican (17–13)

House of Representatives
- Members: 60
- Speaker: James P. Weiers
- Party control: Republican (33–27)

Sessions
- 1st: January 8 – June 20, 2007
- January 14: June 27, 2008 –

The 48th Arizona State Legislature, consisting of the Arizona State Senate and the Arizona House of Representatives, was constituted in Phoenix from January 1, 2007, to December 31, 2008, during the first two years of Janet Napolitano's second term in office. Both the Senate and the House membership remained constant at 30 and 60, respectively. The Democrats gained a seat in the Senate, leaving the Republicans with a 17–13 majority. The Republicans maintained their majority in the lower chamber, 33–27, even though the Democrats picked up 6 seats.

== Sessions ==
The Legislature met for two regular sessions at the State Capitol in Phoenix. The first opened on January 8, 2007, and adjourned on June 20, while the Second Regular Session convened on January 14, 2008, and adjourned sine die on June 27.

There were no Special Sessions.

== State Senate ==
=== Members ===
The asterisk (*) denotes members of the previous Legislature who continued in office as members of this Legislature.

District	Senator	Party	Notes
1	Tom O'Halleran	Republican	
2	Albert Hale*	Democrat	
3	Ron Gould*	Republican	
4	Jack W. Harper*	Republican	
5	Jake Flake*	Republican	
6	Pamela Gorman	Republican	
7	Jim Waring*	Republican	
8	Carolyn S. Allen*	Republican	
9	Robert Burns*	Republican	
10	Linda Gray	Republican	
11	Barbara Leff*	Republican	
12	Robert Blendu*	Republican	
13	Richard Miranda*	Democrat	
14	Debbie McCune Davis	Democrat	
15	Ken Cheuvront*	Democrat	
16	Leah Landrum Taylor	Democrat	
17	Meg Burton Cahill	Democrat	
18	Karen Johnson*	Republican	
19	Chuck Gray	Republican	
20	John Huppenthal*	Republican	
21	Jay Tibshraeny*	Republican	
22	Thayer Verschoor*	Republican	
23	Rebecca Rios*	Democrat	
24	Amanda Aguirre	Democrat	
25	Marsha Arzberger*	Democrat	
26	Charlene Pesquiera	Democrat	
27	Jorge Luis Garcia*	Democrat	
28	Paula Aboud	Democrat	
29	Victor Soltero*	Democrat	
30	Timothy S. Bee*	Republican	

== House of Representatives ==
=== Members ===
The asterisk (*) denotes members of the previous Legislature who continued in office as members of this Legislature.

District	Representative	Party	Notes
1	Lucy Mason*	Republican	
1	Andy Tobin	Republican	
2	Thomas Chabin	Democrat	
2	Albert Tom*	Democrat	
3	Trish Groe*	Republican	
3	Nancy McLain*	Republican	
4	Tom Boone*	Republican	
4	Judy Burges*	Republican	
5	Jack A. Brown*	Democrat	
5	Bill Konopnicki*	Republican	
6	Doug Clark	Republican	
6	Sam Crump	Republican	
7	Ray Barnes*	Republican	
7	Nancy Barto*	Republican	
8	John Kavanagh	Republican	
8	Michelle Reagan*	Republican	
9	Rick Murphy*	Republican	
9	Bob Stump*	Republican	
10	Jackie Thrasher	Democrat	
10	James Weiers*	Republican	
11	Mark DeSimone	Democrat	
11	Adam Driggs	Republican	
12	John B. Nelson*	Republican	
12	Jerry Weiers*	Republican	
13	Steve Gallardo*	Democrat	
13	Martha Garcia*	Democrat	
14	Chad Campbell	Democrat	
14	Robert Meza*	Democrat	
15	David Lujan*	Democrat	
15	Kyrsten Sinema*	Democrat	
16	Cloves Campbell Jr.	Democrat	
16	Ben R. Miranda*	Democrat	
17	Ed Ableser	Democrat	
17	David Schapira	Democrat	
18	Mark Anderson*	Republican	
18	Russell Pearce*	Republican	
19	Kirk Adams	Republican	
19	Rich Crandall	Republican	
20	John McComish*	Republican	
20	Bob Robson*	Republican	
21	Warde Nichols*	Republican	
21	Steven B. Yarbrough*	Republican	
22	Andy Biggs*	Republican	
22	Eddie Farnsworth*	Republican	
23	Barbara McGuire	Democrat	
23	Pete Rios*	Democrat	
24	Lynne Pancrazi	Democrat	
24	Theresa Ulmer	Democrat	
25	Manuel Alvarez*	Democrat	
25	Jennifer Burns*	Republican	
26	J. Peter Hershberger*	Republican	
26	Lena Saradnik	Democrat	
27	Olivia Cajero Bedford*	Democrat	
27	Phil Lopes*	Democrat	
28	David T. Bradley*	Democrat	
28	Steve Farley	Democrat	
29	Linda J. Lopez*	Democrat	
29	Tom Prezelski*	Democrat	
30	Marian McClure*	Republican	
30	Jonathan Paton*	Republican	
