= Steve Huffman (disambiguation) =

Steve Huffman (born 1983) is an American web developer and entrepreneur, CEO of Reddit.

Steve Huffman may also refer to:

- Steve Huffman (Arizona politician), Arizona politician
- Steve Huffman (Ohio politician) (born 1964), Ohio politician
