= Stephen Tully =

Stephen Tully may refer to:

- Steve Tully (born 1980), English footballer
- Stephen Tully (politician), American politician from Arizona
