= Constantin Querard =

American political consultant

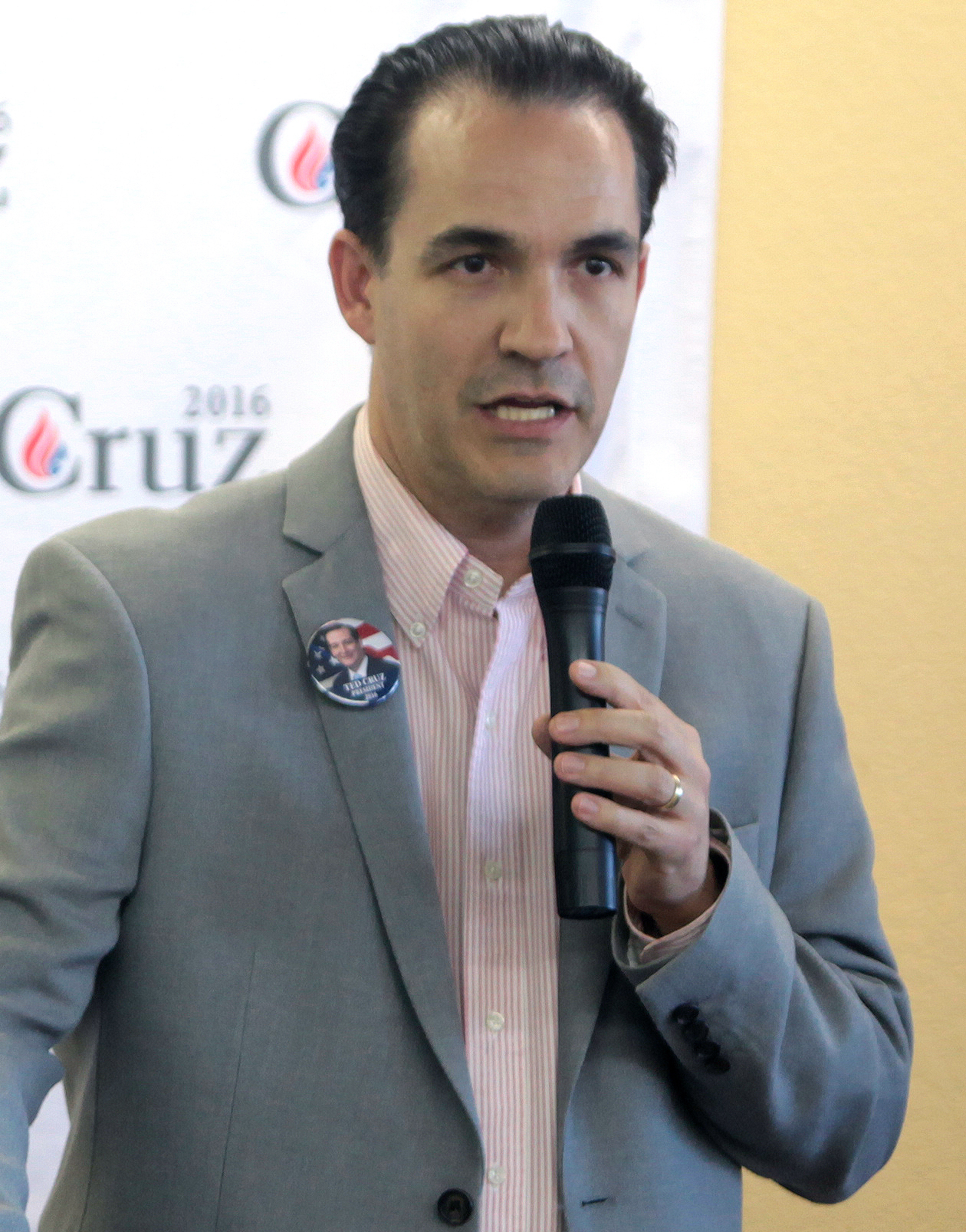
- Born: Denver, Colorado
- Occupation: Political consultant
- Political party: Republican
- Website: Grassroots Partners

Constantin Querard is a conservative political consultant based in Arizona.

== Personal life ==
Querard holds an MBA from Thunderbird School of Global Management. Querard moved to Arizona from Denver, Colorado, and is the son of a Russian mother and a French Grandfather.

== Political activities ==
Querard established the conservative Arizona Family Project.

Following the passage of a 1998 Arizona "clean elections" law, Querard became an important campaign manager in Arizona politics. One of Querard's first clients was Colette Rosati, who Querard convinced to run for the Arizona House of Representatives after deciding that the other Republican candidates were insufficiently conservative. Rosati, previously a homemaker, would ultimately win both the primary and the general election in her Phoenix-based district. By taking advantage of matching funds provisions and emphasizing "louder, bolder" conservatism, Querard helped lead numerous Republicans to victories in state legislative races.

In 2004, Querard's campaign practices were investigated by the Arizona Attorney General's Office and the Citizens Clean Elections Commission. Querard was cleared of those matters and received an apology from the Maricopa GOP for the actions of its chairman at the time.

By 2014, Querard had 25 clients in the state legislature and by 2016, 27 of the 52 Republicans in the State Legislature had been elected by Querard. Querard has been described as "one of the architects" of conservative control of the Arizona legislature.

In addition to his work for state legislative candidates, Querard has also consulted for other campaigns at various levels, from Mayors like Surprise's Skip Hall and Glendale's Jerry Weiers, all the way up to the U.S. Senate and even President of the United States (Cruz 2016)

Querard also does a limited amount of lobbying at the Arizona State Capitol, and has been very active on Article V issues like the Balanced Budget Amendment, Term Limits, and the Convention of States.
