= 2016 Glendale, Arizona, mayoral election =

- August 30, 2016
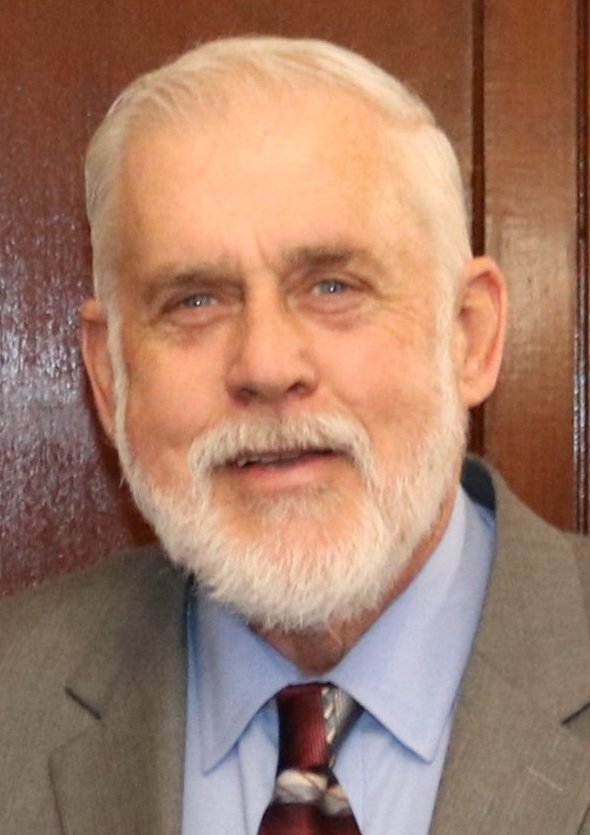

Candidate	Jerry Weiers	Mark Burdick
Party	Nonpartisan	Nonpartisan
Popular vote	13,172	12,767
Percentage	50.6%	49.1%
Mayor before election
Elaine Scruggs
Non-Partisan
Elected mayor
Jerry Weiers
Republican

Glendale, Arizona, held an election for mayor on August 30, 2016. It saw the reelection of Jerry Weiers.

== Results ==
General election result
Candidate	Votes	%
Jerry Weiers (incumbent)	13,172	50.6
Mark Burdick	12,767	49.1
Write-in	83	0.3
Total votes	26,022	

== See also ==
- List of mayors of Glendale, Arizona
