= List of mayors of Glendale, Arizona =

City of Glendale, Arizona mayors

The following is a list of mayors of the city of Glendale, Arizona, USA.

- Archie W. Bennett, 1910-1914
- John Maxwell Pearson, 1914
- Cullen H. Tinker, 1916-1922
- Ova Darling Betts, 1922-1930
- William E. Kalas, ca.1932
- W.B. Barkley, ca.1949
- Henry E. Schrey, 1950-1954
- Robert D. Lundberg, ca.1955-1958
- Byron W. Peck, ca.1959-1960
- Carl H. Stockland, ca.1963
- Max Klass, 1966-1976
- George R. Renner, ca.1988
- Elaine Scruggs, 1993-2013
- Jerry Weiers, 2013–present

== See also ==
- Glendale history
- 2012 Glendale, Arizona, mayoral election
- 2016 Glendale, Arizona, mayoral election
