= 2012 Glendale, Arizona, mayoral election =

- August 28, 2012
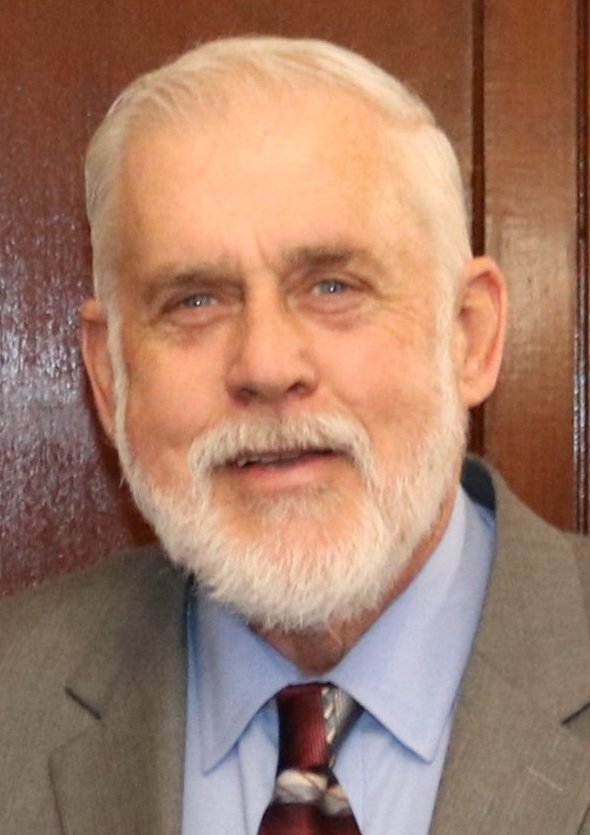

Candidate	Jerry Weiers	Manuel Cruz	Walt Opaska
Party	nonpartisan candidate	nonpartisan candidate	nonpartisan candidate
Popular vote	10,835	7,719	5,121
Percentage	45.7%	32.5%	21.6%
Mayor before election
Jerry Weiers
Republican
Elected mayor
Jerry Weiers
Republican

Glendale, Arizona, held an election for mayor on August 28, 2012. It saw the election of Jerry Weiers.

== Results ==
General election result
Candidate	Votes	%
Jerry Weiers	10,835	45.7
Manuel "Manny" Cruz	7,719	32.5
Walt Opaska	5,121	21.6
Write-in	56	0.2
Total votes	23,731	

== See also ==
- List of mayors of Glendale, Arizona
