= List of mayors of Chandler =

The city of Chandler, Arizona has had 31 mayors in 32 administrations since its incorporation in 1920. City founder Alexander J. Chandler agreed to serve as the city's first mayor after incorporation until a mayor could be elected later that year. Mayors of Chandler are elected to four-year terms and have term limits of two consecutive terms.

No.	Image	Name	Term	Source
1		Alexander J. Chandler	1920–1920	
2		David A. Jacobson	1920–1922	
3		George Armstrong	1922–1924	
4		Park R. Mitten	1924–1928	
5		James Franklin Salladay	1928–1932	
6		Newell Fuller	1932–1934	
7		J. Lee Loveless	1934–1936	
8		Paul W. Bear	1936–1936	
9		James W. Sinks	1936–1937	
10		James Meason	1937–1942	
11		Bill Brayman	1942–1946	
12		Ralph Brown	1946–1948	
13		Dan Francis	1948–1950	
14		Saul Johnson	1950–1952	
15		Otho Dixon	1952–1954	
16		Paul Gaumer	1954–1956	
17		Bert Lewis	1956–1960	
18		Hal Jones	1960–1962	
19		Ralph McKenzie	1962–1964	
20		Andrew Kuhles	1964–1966	
21		George Nader	1966–1972	
22		Raul Navarrete	1972–1976	
23		Ken Thomas	1976–1979	
24		Jerry Maxwell	1979–1980	
25		Jim Patterson	1980–1984	
26		Jerry Brooks	1984–1988	
27		Richard Dugan	1988–1990	
28		Coy Payne	1990–1994	
29		Jay Tibshraeny	1994–2002	
30		Boyd Dunn	2002–2011	
31		Jay Tibshraeny	2011–2019	
32		Kevin Hartke	2019–present	
