= Doris Goodale =

American politician (1949–2020)

Member of the Arizona House of Representatives from the 5th district
- In office January 14, 2013 – January 5, 2015 Serving with Sonny Borrelli
- Succeeded by: Regina Cobb

Member of the Arizona House of Representatives from the 3rd district
- In office January 2009 – January 14, 2013 Serving with Nancy McLain
- Preceded by: Trish Groe

Personal details
- Born: March 8, 1949 Tucson, Arizona, U.S.
- Died: June 5, 2020 (aged 71)
- Party: Republican
- Education: Arizona State University; Phoenix College

Doris Goodale (March 8, 1949 – June 5, 2020) was an American politician and a Republican member of the Arizona House of Representatives representing District 5 since January 14, 2013. Goodale served consecutively from January 2009 until January 14, 2013, in the District 3 seat.

== Background ==
Goodale was born in Tucson, Arizona. She received her associate arts degree from Phoenix College in 1969 and her bachelor's degree in sociology from Arizona State University in 1969. Goodale worked in the Mohave County Probation Office from 1973 to 2005. She also owned the Goodale Consulting Group in 2001. Goodale served on the Kingman School Board from 1988 to 2005.

== Elections ==
- 2012 Redistricted to District 5, and with incumbent Republican Representatives Chester Crandell running for Arizona Senate and Brenda Barton redistricted to District 6, Goodale ran in the four-way August 28, 2012 Republican Primary, placing first with 14,056 votes; in the three-way November 6, 2012 General election, Goodale took the first seat with 41,217 votes and fellow Republican nominee Sonny Borrelli took the second seat ahead of Democratic nominee P. L. Durbin.
- 2006 Challenging District 3 incumbent Republican Representatives Trish Groe and Nancy McLain, Goodale ran in the four-way September 12, 2006 Republican Primary, but lost to Representatives Groe and McLain; in the three-way November 7, 2006 General election, Representative Groe took the first seat and McLain took the second seat ahead of Democratic nominee Luis Lopez.
- 2008 Again challenging incumbent Representatives Groe and McLain, Goodale ran in the three-way September 2, 2008 Republican Primary; Representative McLain placed first, Goodale placed second with 7,587 votes, and Representative Groe placed third; in the three-way November 2, 2010 General election, Representative McLain took the first seat and Goodale took the second seat with 36,177 votes ahead of Democratic nominee Pamela Durbin.
- 2010 Representatives McLain and Goodale were challenged in the three-way August 24, 2010 Republican Primary; Goodale placed first with 11,930 votes and Representative McLain placed second; they were unopposed in the November 2, 2010 General election, where Representative McLain took the first seat and Goodale took the second seat with 34,581 votes.
