= Rich Crandall =

American politician and businessman

Richard D. "Rich" Crandall

Colorado Commissioner of Education
- In office January 2016 – May 19, 2016
- Preceded by: Elliott Asp
- Succeeded by: Katy Anthes

Director of the Wyoming Department of Education
- In office August 1, 2013 – April 2014
- Preceded by: Jim Rose
- Succeeded by: Cindy Hill (Note: As Superintendent of Public Instruction)

Member of the Arizona Senate
- In office January 10, 2011 – August 2013
- Preceded by: Chuck Gray
- Succeeded by: Dave Farnsworth
- Constituency: 16th (January–August 2013); 19th (2011–2013)

Member of the Arizona House of Representatives from the 19th district
- In office January 8, 2007 – January 10, 2011 Serving with Kirk Adams
- Preceded by: Gary Pierce
- Succeeded by: Justin Olson

Personal details
- Born: September 13, 1967 (age 59) Santa Barbara, California, U.S.
- Party: Republican
- Spouse: Leann Larson Crandall
- Children: 13
- Education: Brigham Young University; University of Notre Dame

Richard D. Crandall, known as Rich Crandall (born 1967), is a businessman, former Arizona legislator, and former director of the Wyoming Department of Education.

== Background ==
Crandall was born in Santa Barbara, California. He holds a bachelor's and master's degree in accounting from Brigham Young University and an MBA from the University of Notre Dame in South Bend, Indiana. He is a Certified Public Accountant.

== Career ==
=== Arizona lawmaker ===
Crandall is a moderate Republican a former member of the Arizona State Senate and Arizona House of Representatives. Elected in 2007 to the House and 2010 to the Senate, he resigned in 2013 to accept a position in Wyoming.

=== Wyoming Department of Education ===
Crandall was director of the Wyoming Department of Education, based in the capital city of Cheyenne, Wyoming from August 2013 to April 2014. The position of Director was dissolved when the Wyoming Supreme Court, in a three-to-two vote on 28 January 2014, ruled the legislation that created the position unconstitutional. The court ruled that the law removing the duties of the superintendent of public instruction and placing them into the hands of an appointed director conflicts with the Wyoming State Constitution. The court ruled Crandall's director position as unconstitutional.

=== Education Commissioner of Colorado ===
He was appointed the Education Commissioner of Colorado in December 2015. Crandall resigned from his position as Colorado's Commissioner of Education on May 19, 2016, a mere four months into the job.

=== Current ===
Crandall is the founder and chair of CN Resource and is also the CFO/partner for Crandall Corporate Dietitians. He currently serves on the board of directors of digital marketing firm ChannelNet.

== Personal ==
Crandall is member of the Church of Jesus Christ of Latter-Day Saints. He is married to Leann Larson Crandall and together they have 13 children (seven from his first marriage to Patrice Webb and six from his second marriage).

== Sources ==
- Crandall's legislative bio
