= Coy Payne =

American politician (1929–2019)

- Coy Payne

Mayor of Chandler
- In office 1990–1994
- Preceded by: Richard Dugan
- Succeeded by: Jay Tibshraeny

Chandler City Council
- In office 1983–1990

Personal details
- Born: May 22, 1929 Sulphur Springs, Texas
- Died: December 8, 2019 (age 90)
- Party: Republican
- Education: B.A. Arizona State University

Coy Payne (May 22, 1929 – December 8, 2019) was an American politician who served as the first African-American mayor of Chandler, Arizona. He previously served on the Chandler City Council from 1983 to 1990.

== Biography ==
Payne was born in Sulphur Springs, Texas, one of nine children born to Scott and Virgie Payne. His family moved to Eloy, Arizona in the early 1940s where he picked cotton as a youth so his family could purchase a car. The family moved north to Chandler where there were no schools for Black students and he was forced to attend school in Mesa, Arizona. He was refused admission to the local high school and had to attend all-black Carver High School in Phoenix, Arizona. He briefly attended Arizona State University before dropping out and enlisting in the U.S. Army where he saw combat in the Korean War. He finished his education at ASU after leaving the army and took a job in Chandler as a third-grade teacher; he retired in 1989.

In 1983, he was elected the first African-American to the Chandler City Council. In 1990, he defeated city council member Jane DuComb by a margin of 2:1 to become mayor of Chandler, the first African-American elected mayor of any city in Arizona despite Chandler being only 3% African-American at the time. His predecessor was Richard Dugan. While mayor, he presided over the rapid growth of the city which grew 96 percent between 1990 and 2000, helped create the city's housing authority, and oversaw the expansion of parks and recreation programs.

== Personal life ==
He was married to Willie Woods, an accountant and civil rights activist; they had six children. He died on December 8, 2019.

== See also ==
- List of mayors of Chandler
- List of first African-American mayors
