= Ann Kirkpatrick =

American politician (born 1950)

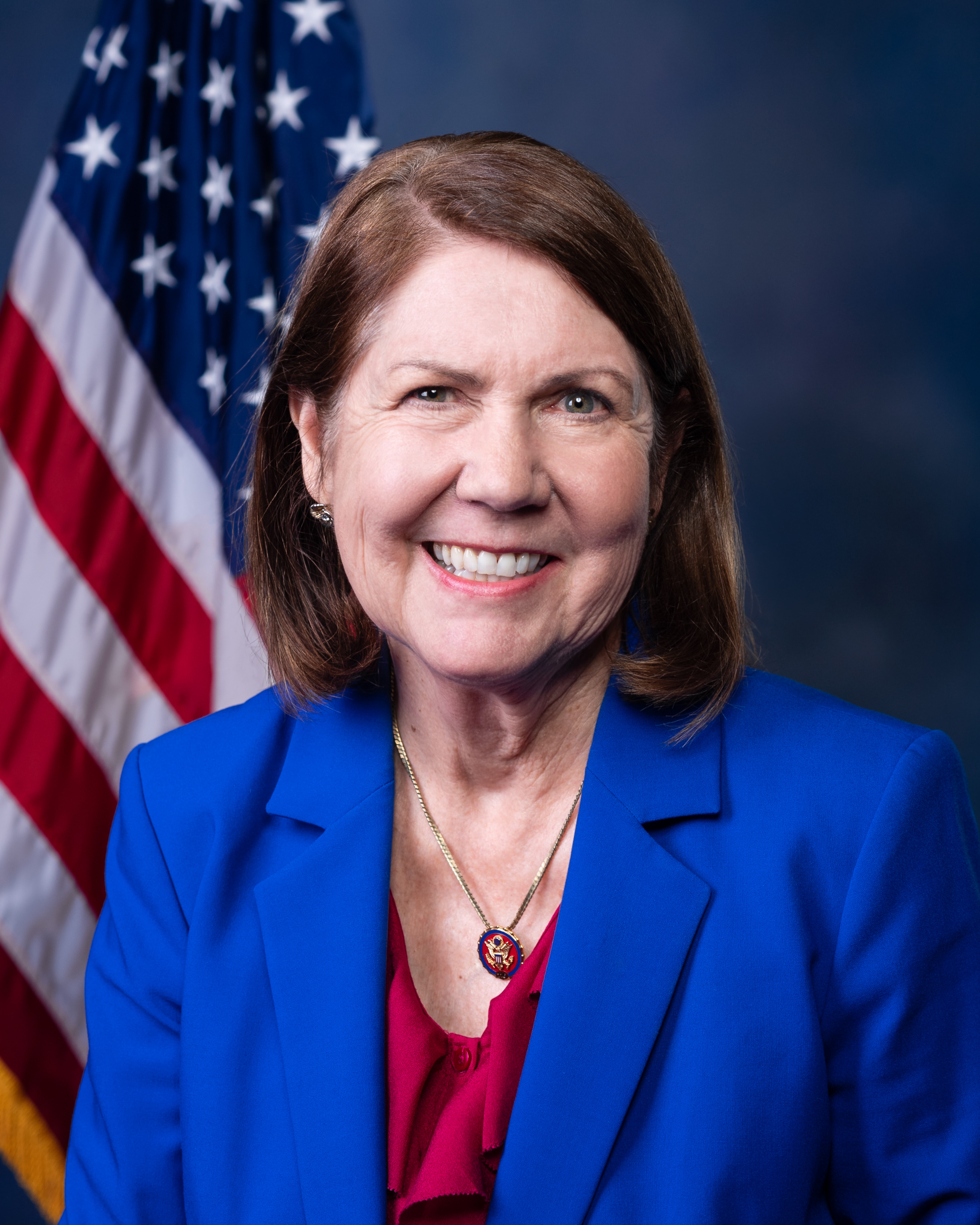
- Official portrait, 2019

Member of the U.S. House of Representatives from Arizona
- In office January 3, 2019 – January 3, 2023
- Preceded by: Martha McSally
- Succeeded by: Juan Ciscomani (redistricted)
- Constituency: 2nd district
- In office January 3, 2013 – January 3, 2017
- Preceded by: Paul Gosar
- Succeeded by: Tom O'Halleran
- Constituency: 1st district
- In office January 3, 2009 – January 3, 2011
- Preceded by: Rick Renzi
- Succeeded by: Paul Gosar
- Constituency: 1st district

Member of the Arizona House of Representatives from the 2nd district
- In office January 10, 2005 – July 24, 2007
- Preceded by: Sylvia Laughter
- Succeeded by: Christopher Deschene

Personal details
- Born: Ann Leila Kirkpatrick; March 24, 1950 (age 76) McNary, Arizona, U.S.
- Party: Democratic
- Spouse: Roger Curley
- Children: 2
- Education: University of Arizona (BA, JD)

Ann Leila Kirkpatrick (born March 24, 1950) is an American politician and retired attorney who served as the U.S. representative for Arizona's 2nd congressional district from 2019 to 2023. A member of the Democratic Party, she represented Arizona's 1st congressional district from 2009 to 2011, and again from 2013 to 2017. Kirkpatrick was a member of the Arizona House of Representatives from 2005 to 2007.

First elected to Congress in 2008 in Arizona's 1st congressional district, Kirkpatrick was unseated in 2010. She regained her seat in a close race in 2012 and was reelected in 2014. Kirkpatrick ran for U.S. Senate in 2016 and was defeated by incumbent Republican John McCain. In 2018, she was elected to Congress in Arizona's 2nd congressional district; she was reelected in 2020. On March 12, 2021, Kirkpatrick announced she would not seek reelection in 2022.

== Early life and early political career ==
Kirkpatrick was born on March 24, 1950, and raised on an Apache Indian reservation near McNary, Arizona. Her parents were European Americans who lived and worked on the reservation. Her mother was a teacher, and her father was a general store owner. When Kirkpatrick was in second grade, her family moved off the reservation to Pinetop-Lakeside. Her maternal uncle, William Bourdon, was elected as a member of the State House.

Kirkpatrick graduated from Blue Ridge High School as the valedictorian. In 1972, she completed her undergraduate degree at the University of Arizona, where she majored in Asian studies and learned to speak Mandarin Chinese. After a brief experience as a teacher, Kirkpatrick decided to go to law school. In 1979, she earned a Juris Doctor from the University of Arizona College of Law.

In 1980, she was elected as Coconino County's first woman deputy county attorney. Kirkpatrick later served as city attorney for Sedona, Arizona. She was a member of the Flagstaff Water Commission. In 2004, she taught business law and ethics at Coconino County Community College."

== Arizona House of Representatives ==
In 2004, Kirkpatrick was elected to represent the 2nd legislative district and took office in January 2005. She was reelected in 2006. In the legislature, Kirkpatrick served as the ranking Democrat on the House Ways and Means Committee and the Education K–12 Committee and Natural Resources Committee.

== U.S. House of Representatives ==
=== Elections ===
==== 2008 ====
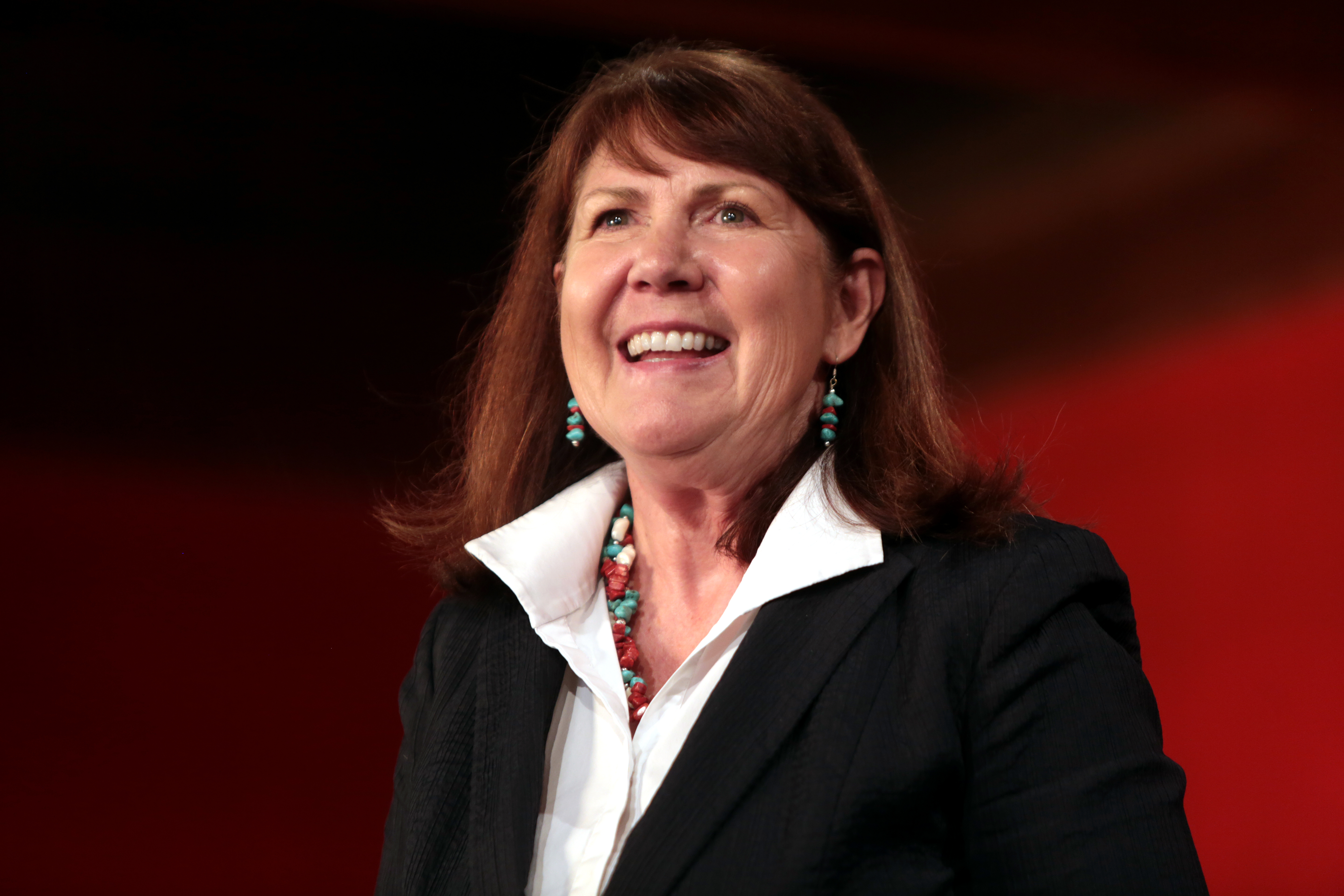
Kirkpatrick at a campaign event in Phoenix, Arizona

On July 24, 2007, Kirkpatrick resigned from the state House to run for the Democratic nomination in Arizona's 1st congressional district. The seat was due to come open after three-term Republican incumbent Rick Renzi announced that he would not seek reelection in the face of a federal indictment on corruption charges, for which he eventually went to prison. Kirkpatrick won the four-way primary by almost 15 points on September 2.

Kirkpatrick defeated Republican Sydney Ann Hay, a mining industry lobbyist, in the general election, with 56% of the vote.

==== 2010 ====
Kirkpatrick was defeated for reelection by Republican nominee Paul Gosar, with 49.7% of the vote to Kirkpatrick's 43.7%. She was endorsed by The Arizona Republic.

==== 2012 ====
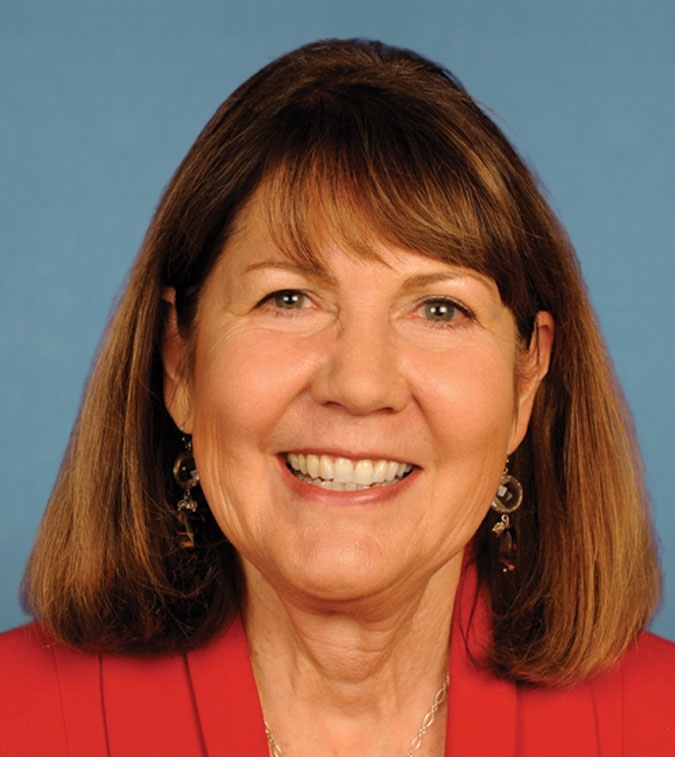
Kirkpatrick during the 113th Congress

Kirkpatrick announced she would run again for her old congressional seat in 2012. Redistricting made the district significantly more Democratic than its predecessor; Democrats had a nine-point registration advantage. Kirkpatrick was initially priming for a rematch against Gosar, but Gosar opted to run for reelection in the newly created, heavily Republican 4th district. Kirkpatrick narrowly won the general election, defeating Republican Jonathan Paton, a former state senator, with less than 50% of the vote, as a Libertarian Party candidate took more than 6%.

==== 2014 ====
Kirkpatrick was reelected with 52.6% of the vote over state Representative Andy Tobin. She faced no opposition in the Democratic primary. According to a December 2012 Washington Post article, Kirkpatrick was one of the 10 most vulnerable incumbents in 2014. She was a member of the Democratic Congressional Campaign Committee's Frontline Program, which was designed to help protect vulnerable Democratic incumbents heading into the 2014 election.

==== 2018 ====
Kirkpatrick ran for the seat in Arizona's 2nd congressional district to replace outgoing Republican Martha McSally, who retired to run for U.S. Senate. Kirkpatrick had to move across the state, from Flagstaff to Tucson, in order to run. She won the election with 54.7% of the vote.

==== 2020 ====
Kirkpatrick was reelected over Republican nominee Brandon Martin.

Kirkpatrick announced she would "term-limit" herself and not seek reelection in 2022.

=== Tenure ===
==== 111th Congress (2009–11) ====
Kirkpatrick voted for the American Recovery and Reinvestment Act, commonly called the stimulus package. She sponsored bill H.R. 4720, the Taking Responsibility for Congressional Pay Act, to lower the salaries of members of Congress. The bill stalled in committee. Kirkpatrick voted for the Patient Protection and Affordable Care Act in March 2010.

==== 113th Congress (2013–15) ====
In May 2013, Kirkpatrick voted against repeal of the Patient Protection and Affordable Care Act.

On March 14, 2014, Kirkpatrick cosponsored the Gulf War Health Research Reform Act of 2014 (H.R. 4261; 113th Congress), a bill that would alter the relationship between the Research Advisory Committee on Gulf War Illnesses (RAC) and the United States Department of Veterans Affairs (VA). The bill makes the RAC an independent organization within the VA, requiring that a majority of the RAC's members be appointed by Congress instead of the VA, and states that the RAC release its reports without needing prior approval from the Secretary of Veterans Affairs. The RAC is responsible for investigating Gulf War syndrome, a chronic multi-symptom disorder affecting returning military veterans and civilian workers of the Gulf War.

==== 117th Congress (2021–23) ====
Kirkpatrick was at the U.S. Capitol on January 6, 2021, to certify the 2020 presidential electoral votes when the Capitol was attacked by Donald Trump supporters. She and her staff were evacuated from their office around 11 AM due to a report of a suspicious object found in the vicinity. About 45 minutes later, they returned to their office. Shortly thereafter, the building was put on lockdown as rioters breached the Capitol. She called the attack a "cowardly assault on Democracy" and blamed President Donald Trump for inciting it. The next day, Kirkpatrick called for Trump's removal from office, calling him "unfit to hold office". She supported the resolution to have Vice President Mike Pence invoke the 25th Amendment to remove Trump from office. Days later, she voted, for the second time, to impeach Trump.

During her final term in office, Kirkpatrick voted in line with Joe Biden's stated position 100% of the time.

=== Committee assignments ===
- Committee on Appropriations (2019–2023)
  - Subcommittee on Defense
  - Subcommittee on Energy and Water Development
  - Subcommittee on Financial Services and General Government
- Committee on Transportation and Infrastructure (2013–2017)
- Committee on Veterans' Affairs (2009–2011; 2013–2017)
- Committee on Homeland Security (2009–2011)
- Committee on Small Business (2009–2011)

=== Caucus memberships ===
- New Democrat Coalition

== 2016 U.S. Senate campaign ==
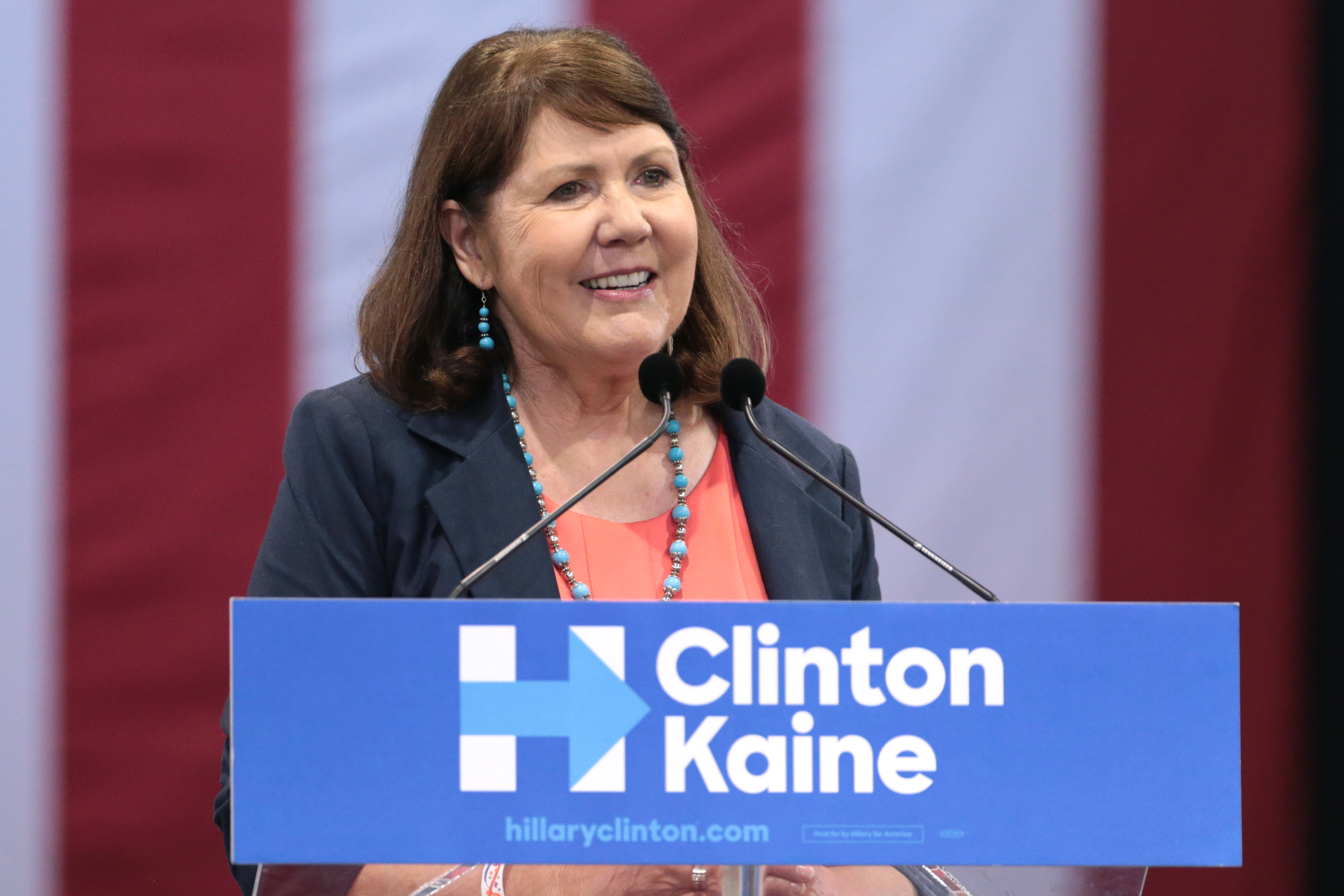
Kirkpatrick speaking in support of Hillary Clinton at a campaign rally in October 2016

On May 26, 2015, Kirkpatrick announced her candidacy for the U.S. Senate seat held by Republican John McCain. She lost to McCain, 53.7% to 40.8%.

== Political positions ==
=== Abortion ===
Kirkpatrick characterizes herself as pro-choice. A friend of hers almost died from an illegal abortion before Roe v. Wade. She has been endorsed by EMILY's List, Planned Parenthood and the National Women's Political Caucus. As a member of the Arizona legislature, Kirkpatrick voted against a bill that would have required notarized parental consent for a minor to receive an abortion. She voted against a bill to ban abortions that take place 20 or more weeks after fertilization. Kirkpatrick opposed the 2022 overturning of Roe v. Wade.

=== Climate change ===
In 2009, as a U.S. Representative, Kirkpatrick voted against the American Clean Energy and Security Act (Waxman-Markey). In 2015, she voted in favor of HR 2042, which blocked implementation of President Obama's signature climate change policy, the Clean Power Plan.

=== Gun policy ===
Before the 2011 Tucson shooting, Kirkpatrick was described as "an ardent gun rights supporter". She voted "to allow guns in national parks and against the reinstatement of a ban on the sale of semi-automatic weapons."

In 2012, her campaign website stated that Kirkpatrick "pledge[d] to oppose any attempt by the federal government to undermine the Second Amendment and infringe on our constitutional right to bear arms." She said the Tucson shooting caused her to rethink her support of gun rights and that "everything is on the table" as a potential solution to the issue of gun violence.

After the 2012 Sandy Hook Elementary School shooting, the Arizona Daily Sun wrote that "Kirkpatrick's position on some firearms laws appears to be changing in light of the mid-December school shooting in Connecticut, her new stance is unclear."

In the wake of the 2016 Orlando nightclub shooting, Kirkpatrick participated in a sit-in on the floor of the U.S. House demanding that Congress address gun violence. She also said, "we must also look beyond this terrible moment and decide what we as a nation are willing to do to prevent hatred, gun violence and domestic terrorism," and mentioned "sensible solutions ... that both respect the 2nd Amendment and keep our communities safer."

In 2019, Kirkpatrick voted for HR 8 Bipartisan Background Checks of 2019. In 2020, she introduced HR 5559 The January 8 National Memorial Act to authorize the Secretary of the Interior to establish a national memorial in Tucson honoring those who were killed on January 8, 2011, when Congresswoman Gabby Giffords was shot.

=== Health care ===
Kirkpatrick voted for the Affordable Care Act (ACA). She has said that her vote for the ACA was "her proudest vote" in Congress. She also voted against numerous attempts to repeal it, and to defund Planned Parenthood. She was one of 106 cosponsors of Pramila Jayapal's Medicare for All bill.

=== Immigration ===
Kirkpatrick has called for "national, comprehensive reform" of United States immigration policy. She supports increased border patrol funding, installation of a ground-based radar system often referred to as a "smart fence", and a temporary-worker program, and temporary protections for some of those living illegally in the United States.

Kirkpatrick says she supports the DREAM Act but did not vote for it in 2010.

Kirkpatrick has said that she would have voted against Arizona's controversial immigration measure Arizona SB 1070.

In March 2014, Kirkpatrick signed a discharge petition intended to force House leaders to bring immigration reform up for a vote on the House floor.

=== Privacy ===
Kirkpatrick voted for CISPA, which would allow federal intelligence agencies to share cybersecurity intelligence and information with private entities and utilities.

=== Same-sex marriage ===
Kirkpatrick supports same-sex marriage.

=== U.S. Supreme Court ===
After the overturning of Roe v. Wade in 2022, Kirkpatrick said the Supreme Court was "no longer a legitimate body" and "the courts' conservatives have dismantled separation of church & state."

== Electoral history ==
Electoral history of Ann Kirkpatrick
Year	Office	Party	Primary			General			Result	Swing	Ref.
Year	Office	Party	Total	%	P.	Total	%	P.	Result	Swing	Ref.
2004	State Representative (Note: In Arizona, each of the state's thirty legislative districts elects two state house representatives from among the top two candidates with the highest vote share.)	Democratic	7,165	32.96%	2nd	28,947	38.72%	1st	Won	Hold	
2006	State Representative	Democratic	7,488	42.75%	1st	26,787	45.48%	1st	Won	Hold	
2008	U.S. Representative	Democratic	26,734	47.24%	1st	155,791	55.88%	1st	Won	Gain	
2010	U.S. Representative	Democratic	46,902	100.00%	1st	99,233	43.73%	2nd	Lost	Gain	
2012	U.S. Representative	Democratic	33,831	63.74%	1st	122,774	48.79%	1st	Won	Gain	
2014	U.S. Representative	Democratic	51,393	100.00%	1st	97,391	52.61%	1st	Won	Hold	
2016	U.S. Senator	Democratic	333,586	99.85%	1st	1,031,245	40.77%	2nd	Lost	Hold	
2018	U.S. Representative	Democratic	33,938	41.85%	1st	161,000	54.73%	1st	Won	Gain	
2020	U.S. Representative	Democratic	77,517	76.33%	1st	209,945	55.10%	1st	Won	Hold	

== Personal life ==
Kirkpatrick is married to Roger Curley and has two children.

On January 15, 2020, Kirkpatrick announced that she was initiating treatment for alcoholism after being injured in a fall. She returned to work on February 26, 2020.

Kirkpatrick is Catholic.

== See also ==
- Women in the United States House of Representatives

== Notes ==
U.S. House of Representatives
Preceded by Rick Renzi	Member of the U.S. House of Representatives from Arizona's 1st congressional district 2009–2011	Succeeded by Paul Gosar
Preceded by Paul Gosar	Member of the U.S. House of Representatives from Arizona's 1st congressional district 2013–2017	Succeeded by Tom O'Halleran
Preceded by Martha McSally	Member of the U.S. House of Representatives from Arizona's 2nd congressional district 2019–2023	Succeeded by Eli Crane
Party political offices
Preceded by Rodney Glassman	Democratic nominee for U.S. Senator from Arizona (Class 3); 2016	Succeeded by Mark Kelly
U.S. order of precedence (ceremonial)
Preceded by Matt Salmon as Former U.S. Representative	Order of precedence of the United States as Former U.S. Representative	Succeeded by Ron Klink as Former U.S. Representative
