= Lena Saradnik =

American politician (born 1947)

Member of the Arizona House of Representatives from the 26th district
- In office January 2007 – January 2009
- Preceded by: Steve Huffman
- Succeeded by: Russell Jones

Personal details
- Born: January 23, 1947 (age 79) Blairsville, Georgia
- Party: Democratic
- Children: Tracy
- Profession: Politician

Lena Saradnik (born January 23, 1947) is a former member of the Arizona House of Representatives. She represented the 26th District for a single term during the 48th Legislature, winning the November 2006 election, filling the seat vacated by Steve Huffman, who chose not to seek re-election. She chose not to run for re-election in 2008.
