= 2006 Arizona elections =

The Arizona state elections of 2006 were held on November 7, 2006. All election results are from the Arizona Secretary of State's office.

The deadline for signing petition signatures to appear on the primary ballot for all races was June 14, 2006.

== State ==
Races for Governor of Arizona, Attorney General of Arizona, Secretary of State of Arizona, State Treasurer, Superintendent of Public Instruction, State Mine Inspector, and two seats on the five-member Corporation Commission will be decided. All races except for the State Mine Inspector, State Treasurer, and one seat on the Corporation Commission feature incumbents running for re-election.

=== Attorney General ===
Results by county: Goddard: 50–60%; 60–70%; 70–80%; Montgomery: 50-60%

Democratic incumbent Terry Goddard, the former mayor of Phoenix, Arizona, ran for a second four-year term after winning his first in 2003. He was challenged by Republican Bill Montgomery, former prosecutor of Maricopa County.

Arizona Attorney General general election
Party	Candidate	Votes	%
Democratic	Terry Goddard	899,007	60.2%
Republican	Bill Montgomery	595,317	39.8%
Total votes		1,494,324	100.0%

=== Secretary of State ===
Results by county: Brewer: 50-60%; 60-70%; Torres: 40–50%; 50–60%; 60–70%

Republican incumbent Jan Brewer, the former chair of the Maricopa County Board of Supervisors, ran for a second four-year term, after winning her first term in 2002. She was challenged by Democrat Israel Torres, the former Arizona Registrar of Contractors and a businessman and attorney, and Libertarian Ernest Hancock, a talk radio producer, real estate agent, and restaurant owner.

Arizona Secretary of State general election
Party	Candidate	Votes	%
Republican	Jan Brewer	848,394	57.2%
Democratic	Israel Torres	583,646	39.4%
Libertarian	Ernest Hancock	51,093	3.4%
Write-in	Selena A. Naumoff	35	0.0%
Total votes		1,483,168	100.0%

=== Superintendent of Public Instruction ===
Results by county Horne: 50–60%; 60–70%; Williams: 50–60%; 60–70%

Republican incumbent Tom Horne ran against Democratic challenger Jason Williams.

Arizona Superintendent of Public Instruction general election
Party	Candidate	Votes	%
Republican	Tom Horne	781,678	53.8%
Democratic	Jason Williams	672,909	46.2%
Total votes		1,454,587	100.0%

=== State Treasurer ===
Results by county: Martin: 50-60%; 60-70%; Singh: 50–60%; 60–70%

Republican incumbent Dean Martin ran against Democratic challenger Rano Singh.

Arizona State Treasurer general election
Party	Candidate	Votes	%
Republican	Dean Martin	821,138	56.7%
Democratic	Rano Singh	627,190	43.3%
Total votes		1,448,328	100.0%

=== State Mine Inspector ===
Results by county Hart: 90–100%

Republican incumbent Joe Hart, a former state representative and businessman, ran for reelection uncontested.

Arizona State Mine Inspector general election
Party	Candidate	Votes	%
Republican	Joe Hart	1,057,097	100.0%
Total votes		1,057,097	100.0%

=== Corporation Commissioner ===
Two seats on the Arizona Corporation Commission are up for re-election. Republican incumbents Kris Mayes and Gary Pierce ran for the seats, challenged by Democrats Richard Boyer and Mark Manoil. Libertarian Rick Fowlkes also ran for the position.

Arizona Corporation Commissioner general election
Party	Candidate	Votes	%
Republican	Kris Mayes	653,344	26.1%
Republican	Gary Pierce	638,466	25.5%
Democratic	Richard Boyer	581,885	23.2%
Democratic	Mark Manoil	541,562	21.6%
Libertarian	Rick Fowlkes	91,684	3.7%
Total votes		2,506,941	100.0%

=== Legislative elections ===
All 60 seats in the Arizona House of Representatives and all 30 seats in the Arizona Senate will be up for election. There are five incumbents not seeking re-election to the seats they currently hold, and eight races in which there is only one candidate for election.

Five incumbents—three Democrats and two Republicans— retired and didn't seek another elective office. Eleven State House members ran for the State Senate, and one State Senator ran for a seat in the State House; switching between chambers, especially when a term limit has been reached in one chamber, is a common occurrence in the Arizona Legislature. Two members of the State Legislature sought statewide offices, and one sought election to the United States House of Representatives.

There were 14 races in which an incumbent Senator or both the incumbent Representatives are sought reelection and faced a primary challenge for the nomination(s) of their respective parties. Out of the 90 state legislative races, there are only six in which there are candidates ran without opposition. The Republican Party needed to pick up one seat in the State House and two in the State Senate and lose none of their own in either chamber to gain a legislature that could override a Governor's veto. The Democratic Party needed to pick up nine seats in the State House without losing any of their own to form a House majority, and pick up three in the State Senate without losing any of their own to form a Senate majority.

=== Judicial elections ===
When a vacancy occurs on the bench, a Judicial Nominating Committee approves the names of at least three applicants for nomination, from which the Governor appoints one to the position. After appointment, all Judges and Justices are subject to judicial election retentions, statewide for Justices and in their separate districts for Judges. Supreme Court Justices serve a six-year term; all other state Judges serve four-year terms. There is a mandatory retirement age of 65 for all judicial offices.

=== Ballot propositions ===
This article does not yet include complete information about the state propositions placed on the ballot, but major propositions for Arizona in 2006 included:

- An attempt to add language to the AZ Constitution that would declare a marriage as only between a man and a woman (did not pass; as of 2006, AZ is the only state to reject a same-sex marriage ban proposed to its voters, though an amendment to the state constitution passed in 2008)
- Two competing statewide smoking bans—one sponsored by R.J. Reynolds Tobacco Co. and one sponsored by various health organizations. (The health orgs' Prop 201 passed and will ban smoking in all indoor locations except some tobacco shops and some fraternal organizations)
- Four propositions that affected illegal immigrants, including ones that would make English the official language of Arizona, and restrict some currently held rights of illegal immigrants.

== See also ==
- 2006 United States gubernatorial elections
