= Mark DeSimone =

American politician

Member of the Arizona House of Representatives from the 11th district
- In office January 2007 – January 2009
- Preceded by: John Allen; Stephen Tully
- Succeeded by: Eric Meyer

Personal details
- Born: Rome, New York
- Party: Democratic
- Spouse: Mali
- Children: Benjamin, Ava
- Profession: Politician

Mark DeSimone is a former American politician. He was a member of the Arizona House of Representatives for a single term. He represented the 11th District during the 48th Legislature, winning the November 2006 election.

On the last day of the legislative session in 2008 DeSimone was arrested for spousal abuse. A few days later, he resigned his seat. The civil charges were dropped after counseling.

He was unsuccessful in his bid for re-election in 2008.

In June 2019, DeSimone was sentenced to 65 years' imprisonment for the 2016 first-degree murder of his friend, Duilio Antonio "Tony" Rosales, during a vacation in Alaska. In what DeSimone claimed was an accident, Rosales was shot twice in the back of the head.
