= Jay Tibshraeny =

American politician (born 1954)

Mayor of Chandler, Arizona
- In office January 13, 2011 – January 13, 2019
- Preceded by: Boyd Dunn
- Succeeded by: Kevin Hartke
- In office 1994–2002
- Preceded by: Coy Payne
- Succeeded by: Boyd Dunn

Member of the Arizona Senate from the 21st District
- In office 2003–2010
- Preceded by: Russell Bowers
- Succeeded by: Steve Yarbrough

Vice-Mayor of Chandler, Arizona
- In office 1990–1994

Personal details
- Born: Albert Jay Tibshraeny Jr. 1954 (age 71–72) Mesa, Arizona, U.S.
- Party: Republican
- Spouse: Karen M. Tibshraeny
- Children: Lauren Noel Rose Tibshraeny
- Education: Arizona State University
- Occupation: Politician

Jay Tibshraeny ( /ˈtɪbʃreɪniː/ TIB-shray-nee, born in 1954) is an American politician. A former senator in the Arizona Senate, he has been the Justice of Peace since 2019. He previously served as the mayor of Chandler, Arizona from 1994 through 2002, and once more from 2011 to 2019.

== Background ==
Albert Jay Tibshraeny Jr. was born in Mesa, Arizona in 1954. He is of Lebanese descent on his father's side. When Tibshraeny was born, his father was a cotton farmer around Eloy, Arizona. His parents were married on February 16, 1947. Jay has one brother, Mike, and two sisters, Joyce and Janice. He graduated high school in 1972. He attended Arizona State University where he received a bachelor's degree in accounting in 1977. For ten years, during and after his college years, Jay worked with his father in the construction business.

== Political career ==
=== Planning and Zoning Commissioner ===
Tibshraeny became involved in politics in 1979 when Chandler held its first and only recall election in which the mayor and several city council members were removed from office. In 1980, Tibshraeny was appointed to Chandler's Planning and Zoning Commission. He worked with the construction of Intel's plant in West Chandler.

=== First mayorship ===
In 1986, Tibshraeny ran for Chandler City Council, winning a seat in March of that year. He attributes his achievement to his "involvement with youth and things". In 1990, he became vice-mayor of Chandler under Coy Payne, the first black mayor in Arizona. In 1994, Tibshraeny ran for mayor of Chandler. He took the seat in March, and during his time as mayor, he oversaw Chandler's transition from a rural town to a bedroom community for Phoenix. He oversaw the construction of the Chandler Fashion Center. He was reelected to the position four times over the next eight years, the maximum number of times a mayor can be reelected in Chandler. (Note: In 2012, Proposition 452 was passed, changing the term limits from four consecutive two-year terms to two consecutive four-year terms.)

=== Arizona State Senator ===
In 2002, Tibshraeny ran for the newly created 21st District in the southeastern Phoenix metro area. The district includes parts of Chandler and Queen Creek. He won the primary election, held on September 10, 2002, beating the only other candidate, Morris Cooper. This meant that Tibshraeny ran unopposed in the general elections on November 5 in the same year.

=== Second mayorship ===
Tibshraeny was a state senator for eight years. In 2010, Tibshraeny stepped down and ran once again for mayor of Chandler. He ran unopposed, winning over 99% of the votes, with 0.73% of the voted going to write-in candidates. He ran again in 2011 for mayor, and like the previous term, was unopposed. His term expired in 2019, where he continued his public service as a Justice of Peace in the San Marcos Justice Court.

Chandler mayoral election, 2010
Candidate	Votes	%
Jay Tibshraeny	26,823	99.27
write-in	132	0.53
Source: Maricopa County Recorder

Chandler mayoral election, 2012
Candidate	Votes	%
Jay Tibshraeny	24,637	99.47
write-in	197	0.73
Source: Maricopa County Recorder

== See also ==
- List of mayors of Chandler

== Notes ==
Political offices
Preceded by Coy Payne	Mayor of Chandler, Arizona; 1994-2002	Succeeded by Boyd Dunn
Preceded by Russell Bowers	Arizona State Senator for the 21st District; 2003-2010	Succeeded by Steve Yarbrough
Preceded by Boyd Dunn	Mayor of Chandler, Arizona; 2011-present	Incumbent
