= Doug Clark (Arizona politician) =

American politician

Member of the Arizona House of Representatives from the 6th district
- In office January 2007 – January 2009
- Preceded by: Ted Carpenter
- Succeeded by: Carl Seel

Personal details
- Born: Prescott, Arizona
- Party: Republican
- Children: Travis, Tanner
- Profession: Politician

Doug Clark is a former member of the Arizona House of Representatives from January 2007 until January 2009. He was elected to the House for his only term in November 2006, representing District 6. He did not run for re-election in 2008.
