= Trish Groe =

American politician

Member of the Arizona House of Representatives from the 3rd district
- In office January 2005 – January 2009
- Preceded by: Joe Hart; Bill Wagner III
- Succeeded by: Doris Goodale

Personal details
- Born: November 2, 1969 (age 56) Waukegan, Illinois, US
- Party: Republican
- Spouse: Frank

Trish Groe is a former member of the Arizona House of Representatives, serving from 2005 through 2009. A Republican, she was first elected to the House in November 2004, and was re-elected in 2006.

Groe pleaded guilty to Driving Under the Influence having been pulled over on March 22, 2007. Since she had already been convicted of driving on a suspended license, she was sentenced to spend 10 days in jail and fined $2950.

She lost in the primary in 2008 to fellow incumbent Nancy McLain and Doris Goodale, both of whom went on to win in the general election.
