= Kirk Adams =

American politician (born 1973)

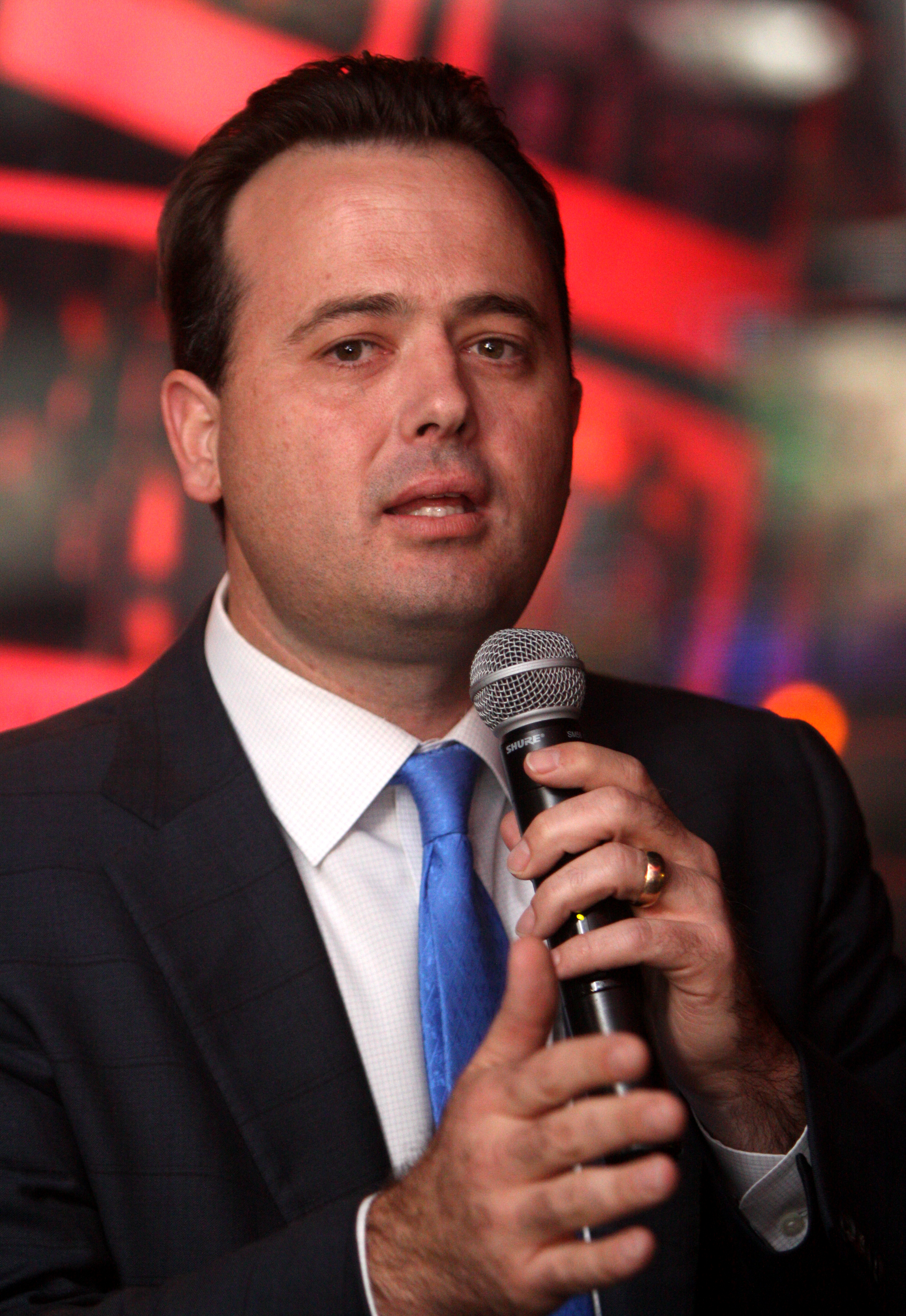
- Adams in 2012

Chief of Staff to the Governor of Arizona
- In office January 5, 2015 – December 18, 2018
- Governor: Doug Ducey
- Preceded by: Scott Smith
- Succeeded by: Daniel Scarpinato

50th Speaker of the Arizona House of Representatives
- In office January 12, 2009 – April 29, 2011
- Preceded by: James Weiers
- Succeeded by: Andy Tobin

Member of the Arizona House of Representatives from the 19th district
- In office March 2006 – April 29, 2011
- Preceded by: Chuck Gray
- Succeeded by: Justin Pierce

Personal details
- Born: February 2, 1973 (age 53) Phoenix, Arizona, U.S.
- Party: Republican
- Spouse: JaNae Adams
- Education: University of Phoenix (BS)

Kirk Adams (born February 2, 1973) is an American politician who served as the 50th Speaker of the Arizona House of Representatives from 2008 to 2011. A member of the Republican Party, he was the Arizona State Representative for the 19th district from 2006 to 2011. Adams also served as Chief of Staff to Governor Doug Ducey from 2015 until 2018.

== Early life and education ==
Adams was born in Phoenix, Arizona and graduated from Mountain View High School in Mesa, Arizona in 1991. He served a mission on behalf of the Church of Jesus Christ of Latter-day Saints in Tonga.

== Political career ==
=== Arizona State Legislature ===
Adams was first elected to the Arizona State Legislature in 2006. During his tenure in the House of Representatives, he endorsed legislation which resulted in the largest permanent tax cut in Arizona history. As Speaker, he took on public-employee unions, authoring legislation to reform Arizona's pension system for public employees by raising the retirement age, eliminating cost of living adjustments, preventing employees from receiving a pension while working, reducing benefits for elected officials and requiring police officers, firefighters, elected officials and corrections employees to pay more for their pensions. He chose not to take part in the elected officials retirement plan himself, earning him recognition from the National Taxpayers Union.

As Speaker, Adams supported Arizona's immigration reform bill and solicited outside funding to defend the measure in court.

=== 2012 congressional campaign ===
In the spring of 2011, Adams resigned from office to announce that he would run in 2012 for Congress in Arizona's 5th congressional district, after redistricting, the seat left open by Jeff Flake. He was then defeated by former U.S. Representative Matt Salmon in the primary.

A few weeks after losing the primary, Adams became president of Americans for Responsible Leadership, a political lobbying non-profit 501(c)(4). Adams has claimed as one of his responsibilities the allocation of funds and directed $750,000 spent opposing Arizona Proposition 204 and $450,000 against Proposition 121. Under Adams's direction, Americans for Responsible Leadership funneled a total of $11 million given by undisclosed sources via Americans for Job Security and the Center to Protect Patient Rights to groups in California who used the money to oppose California's Proposition 30 and support the anti-union Proposition 32. Proposition 30 won and Proposition 32 was defeated; California's Attorney General announced considering a money laundering investigation against Americans for Responsible Leadership and those that directed its funds.

=== Chief of Staff to the Governor of Arizona ===
On December 2, 2014, Governor-elect Doug Ducey announced that Adams, who was already a co-chair of Ducey's transition committee would become his chief of staff. Ducey said, "Kirk's accomplishments, talent and knowledge are second-to-none" and "his record as a policy leader, consensus-builder and budget expert will assist in my efforts to work closely with the Legislature to balance the budget, and put in place policies that encourage job creation and economic growth. I have the utmost confidence in Kirk and I am very pleased he will serve as my chief of staff."

Adams was said to be a leading contender to fill the United States Senate seat vacated by the late Senator John McCain.

== Personal life ==
Adams and his wife JaNae live in Mesa and have six children. Adams is a Latter-day Saint.

Political offices
Preceded by James Weiers	Speaker of the Arizona House of Representatives; 2008–2011	Succeeded by Andy Tobin
