= Elaine Scruggs =

American politician

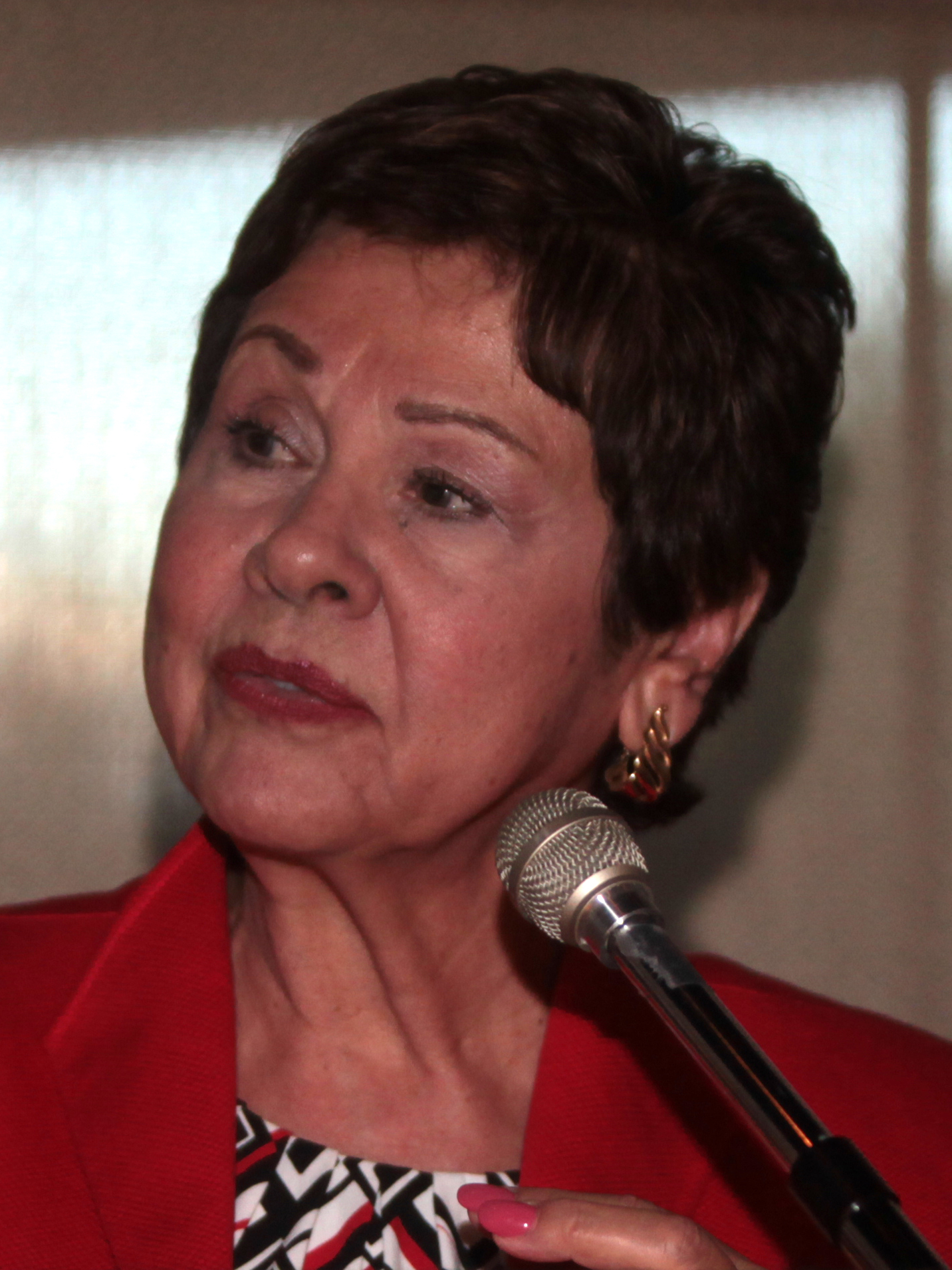
Scruggs in 2014

Elaine Scruggs (Non-Partisan), is the former mayor of Glendale, Arizona, relocated from Pasadena, California with her husband Larry in 1971. Scruggs served as mayor of Glendale from 1993 to 2013.

In 2004 she was elected as chairman of the Maricopa Association of Governments' Transportation Policy Committee which guides transportation investments.

Through her efforts, Glendale was named the first Kids at Hope city in the United States.

== See also ==
- List of mayors of Glendale, Arizona
