= Jonathan Paton =

American politician (born 1971)

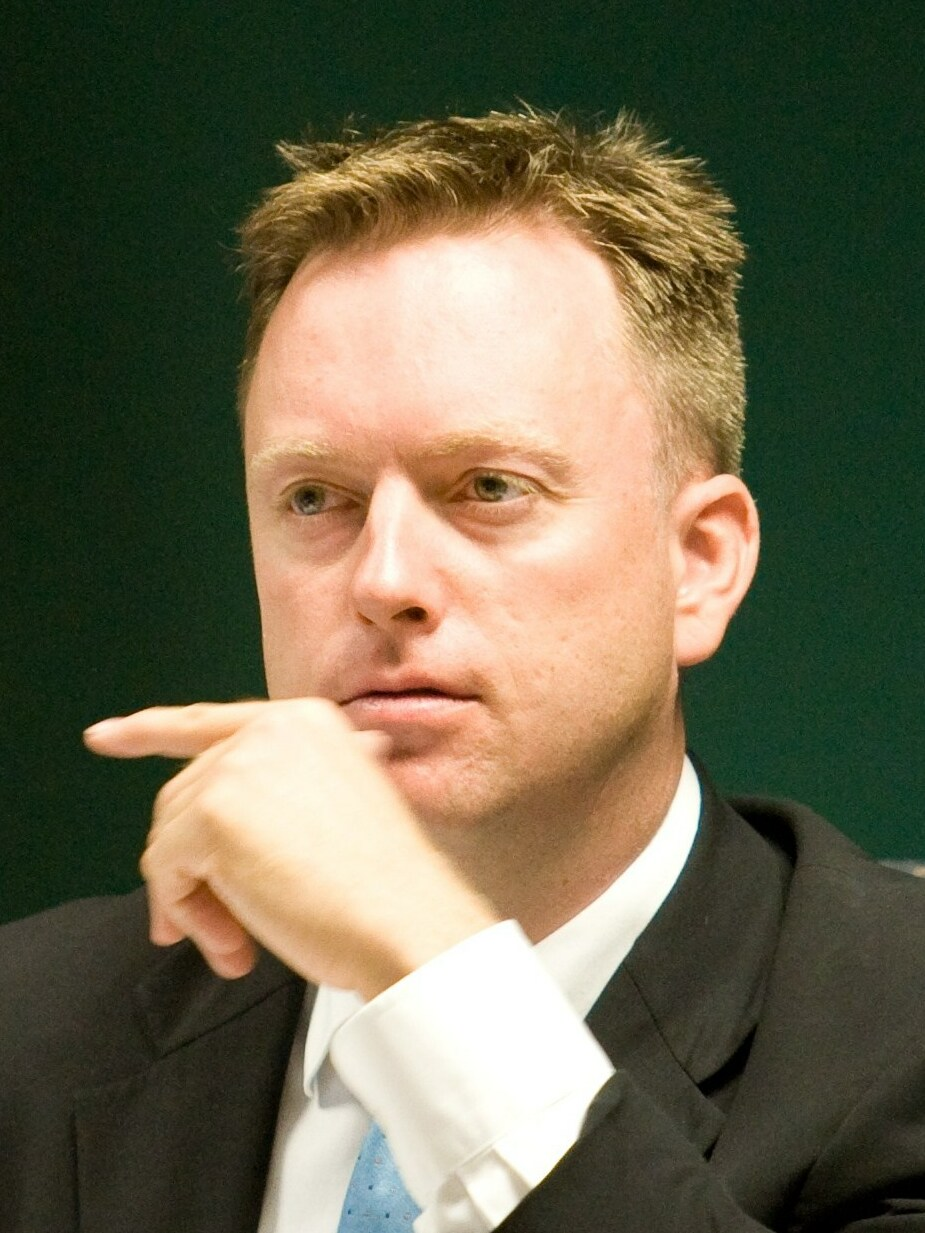
- Paton in 2010

Member of the Arizona Senate from the 30th district
- In office 2009–2011
- Preceded by: Tim Bee
- Succeeded by: Frank Antenori

Member of the Arizona House of Representatives from the 30th district
- In office 2005–2009

Personal details
- Born: June 10, 1971 (age 55) Tucson, Arizona, U.S.
- Party: Republican
- Education: University of Arizona (B.A., M.A.)
- Profession: Businessman, Military Officer
- Awards: Army Achievement Medal, Army Commendation Medal

Military service
- Branch/service: United States Army Reserve
- Years of service: 1999–present
- Rank: Captain
- Battles/wars: Iraq War

Jonathan Paton (born June 10, 1971) is an American politician who served in both houses of the Arizona State Legislature. He served as an intelligence officer in the U.S. Army Reserve, and participated in Operation Iraqi Freedom. As a Republican, he was first elected to represent Arizona's 30th legislative district in the Arizona House of Representatives in 2004. In 2008, he was elected to the Arizona Senate from the same district.

On January 17, 2010, Paton announced he would be challenging Democratic U.S. Representative Gabby Giffords in that year's election. He subsequently resigned from the state senate to focus his efforts on campaigning for Congress. Paton lost in the 2010 Republican primary and endorsed his former opponent, Jesse Kelly. He ran for Congress again in 2012, this time in Arizona's newly redrawn 1st congressional district, ending in close defeat against Democratic opponent Ann Kirkpatrick.

== Early life, education, and early career ==
Paton was born in Tucson, Arizona. He grew up on the city's East Side. He graduated from Sabino High School in 1989. During his senior year in high school Paton worked at Marie Callender's restaurant as a busboy and saved up the funds to go to Germany as a Rotary exchange student. He returned home and began his studies at the University of Arizona. In the coming years he would spend more years overseas studying in Almaty, Kazakhstan with the Sister Cities Program, LMU Munich as a Rotary Foundation Scholar and in Moscow through a program administered by the University of Arizona. He also interned with the Arizona State Senate in 1995. Paton graduated from the University of Arizona summa cum laude and with honors in German and Russian in 1996. He continued on to the graduate program in German at the University of Arizona.

Paton went on to work for the Southern Arizona Homebuilders Association, representing one of the key industries and job providers in Southern Arizona. In 2001, Paton began a political consulting firm in Tucson called Paton & Associates. He has worked with numerous clients in state and local races as well as on initiative campaigns.

== Military service ==
In 1999 Paton enlisted in the United States Army Reserve. He served in the 5-104th Military Intelligence Battalion at Fort Huachuca, Arizona. He was named "Soldier of the Year" for his battalion, brigade and eventually for the entire 104th Division in 2000. After becoming instructor qualified and being promoted to sergeant, he received his commission as a second lieutenant.

In 2005 after his first year in office, he was called up for active duty for six months in a new Army program called the Basic Officer Leaders Course, which combines infantry training at Fort Benning, Georgia with military intelligence training at Fort Huachuca. He graduated as class leader of the Military Intelligence Officer Basic Course in January 2006. He continues to serve as a captain and a qualified 35D all-source intelligence officer.

In late July 2006, Paton announced he was being voluntarily deployed to Iraq. The announcement received national and international media attention. He was the only state representative to be reelected while deployed in the CENTCOM theater of operations in 2006. Paton served as an intelligence officer involved in operations throughout Iraq. His tour of duty ended at the end of February 2007.

== Arizona legislature ==
First elected to the state House in 2004, Paton sponsored a bill that allowed the state to crack down on human smugglers—the first of its kind in the country. He was a key supporter of an extension of state financing for Rio Nuevo, a downtown redevelopment project in Tucson. He was the prime sponsor of a bill eliminating state income taxes for active duty military personnel in Arizona.

In his second term in the House, Paton sponsored legislation that forced the Arizona State Retirement System to divest itself of all funds that included petroleum companies doing business with Iran. Paton was most known in 2007, however, for a series of hearings on CPS following the deaths of three Tucson children murdered after their parents were investigated by CPS. Paton, along with State Representative Kirk Adams, led the hearings on CPS negligence in the cases. The two sponsored a package of six bills designed to open up CPS case records of murdered children and create more accountability for the agency. All six bills were eventually signed into law by Gov. Janet Napolitano in 2008. Due to his work on open records and freedom of information, Paton was awarded the "Freedom of Information Award" by the Arizona Newspaper Association two years in a row. In 2009 The Arizona Chamber of Commerce and Industry named Paton "Senator of the Year."

In 2008, State Senator Tim Bee finished his last term in the legislature representing District 30 due to term limits. In a bid for Bee's State Senate seat in November 2008, Paton defeated Democrat Georgette Valle in the General Election by over 20 points. Incoming Senator President Bob Burns appointed Paton to serve as Chairman of the Senate Judiciary Committee, a post once held by Tucsonans Elaine Richardson (D) and Patti Noland (R).

Before leaving the Senate to run for U.S. Congress, Paton voted in favor of SB1070, Arizona's immigration law.

=== Committee assignments ===
- Senate Judiciary Committee
- Senate Commerce and Economic Development Committee
- Senate Education, Accountability and Reform Committee
