= Steve Huffman (Arizona politician) =

American politician

Member of the Arizona House of Representatives from the 12th district
- In office January 1999 – January 2003
- Preceded by: Winifred Hershberger

Member of the Arizona House of Representatives from the 26th district
- In office January 2003 – January 2007
- Succeeded by: Lena Saradnik

Personal details
- Party: Republican
- Profession: Politician

Steve Huffman is an American politician who is a former member of the Arizona House of Representatives, serving from January 1999 until January 2007. He was first elected to the House in November 1998, representing District 12, and won re-election to that district in 2000. After redistricting in 2002, Huffman was reelected in both 2002, now representing District 26, and 2004.
