= Jerry Weiers =

American politician

Jerry P. Weiers
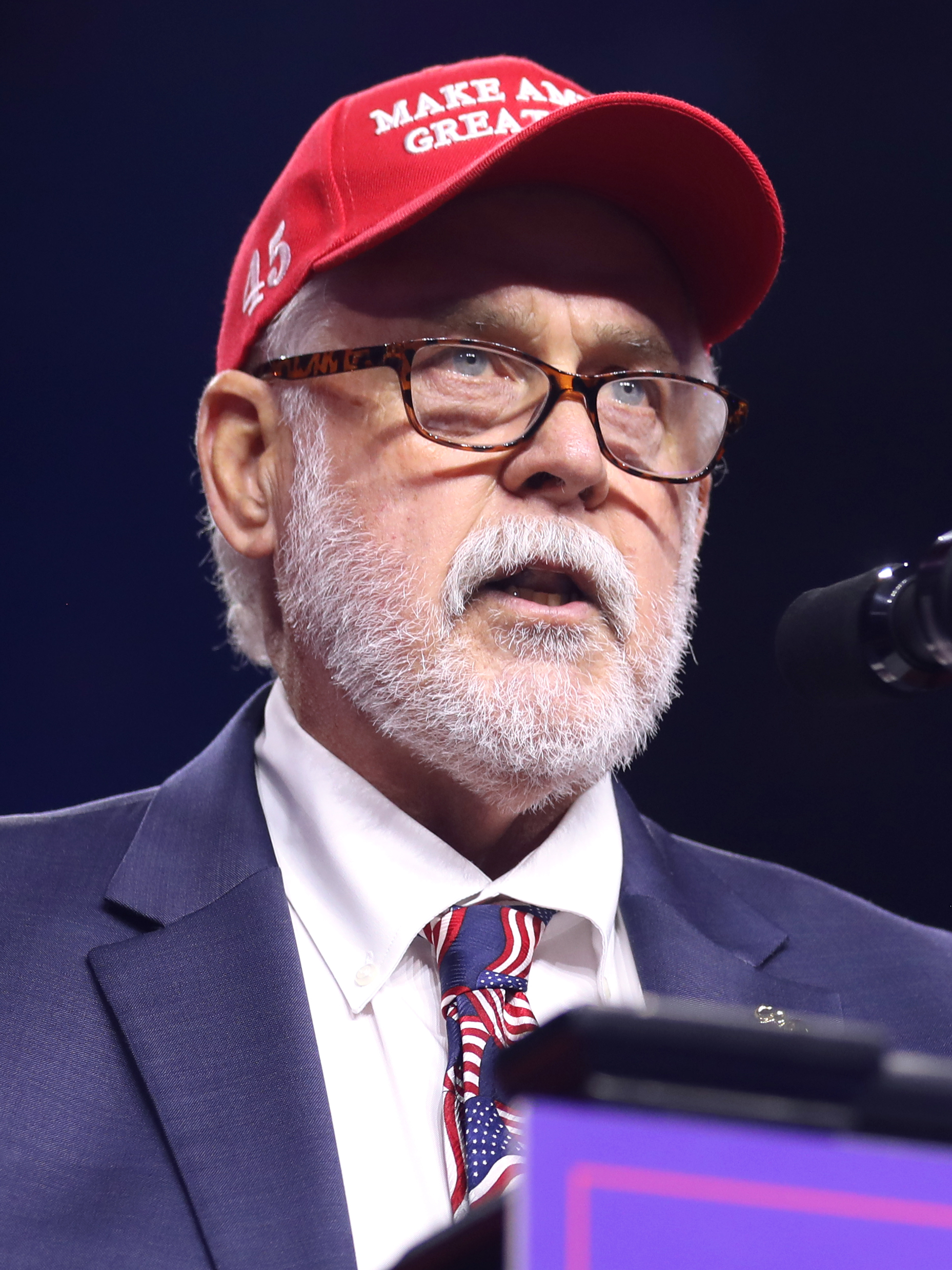
- Weiers in 2024

Mayor of Glendale, Arizona
- Incumbent
- Assumed office January 2013
- Preceded by: Elaine Scruggs

Member of the Arizona House of Representatives from the 12th district
- In office January 2005 – January 2013
- Preceded by: Bill Arnold
- Succeeded by: Darin Mitchell (in District 13 after redistricting)

Personal details
- Born: South Dakota, United States
- Party: Republican
- Relatives: Jim Weiers (brother)
- Profession: Politician

Jerry P. Weiers is an American politician, who's currently serving as the mayor of Glendale, Arizona, a position he has held since January 2013. Prior to that, Weiers served four consecutive terms in the Arizona House of Representatives, representing Arizona's 12th District.

A Republican, Weiers first moved from his home state South Dakota to Arizona in 1966. He has made history in the Arizona State Legislature by serving alongside his brother Jim Weiers, becoming the first brothers in Arizona history to serve together in the state legislature.

== Personal life ==
Jerry Weiers had a brother, who was also an Arizona local politician and fellow State Legislature member, Jim Weiers (1953–2024).

Weiers has been married for more than three decades to his wife Sandy. They have one daughter. Weiers also lived in Alaska and two years in New Mexico.

== See also ==
- 2012 Glendale, Arizona mayoral election
- 2016 Glendale, Arizona mayoral election
- List of mayors of Glendale, Arizona
