= John McComish =

American politician

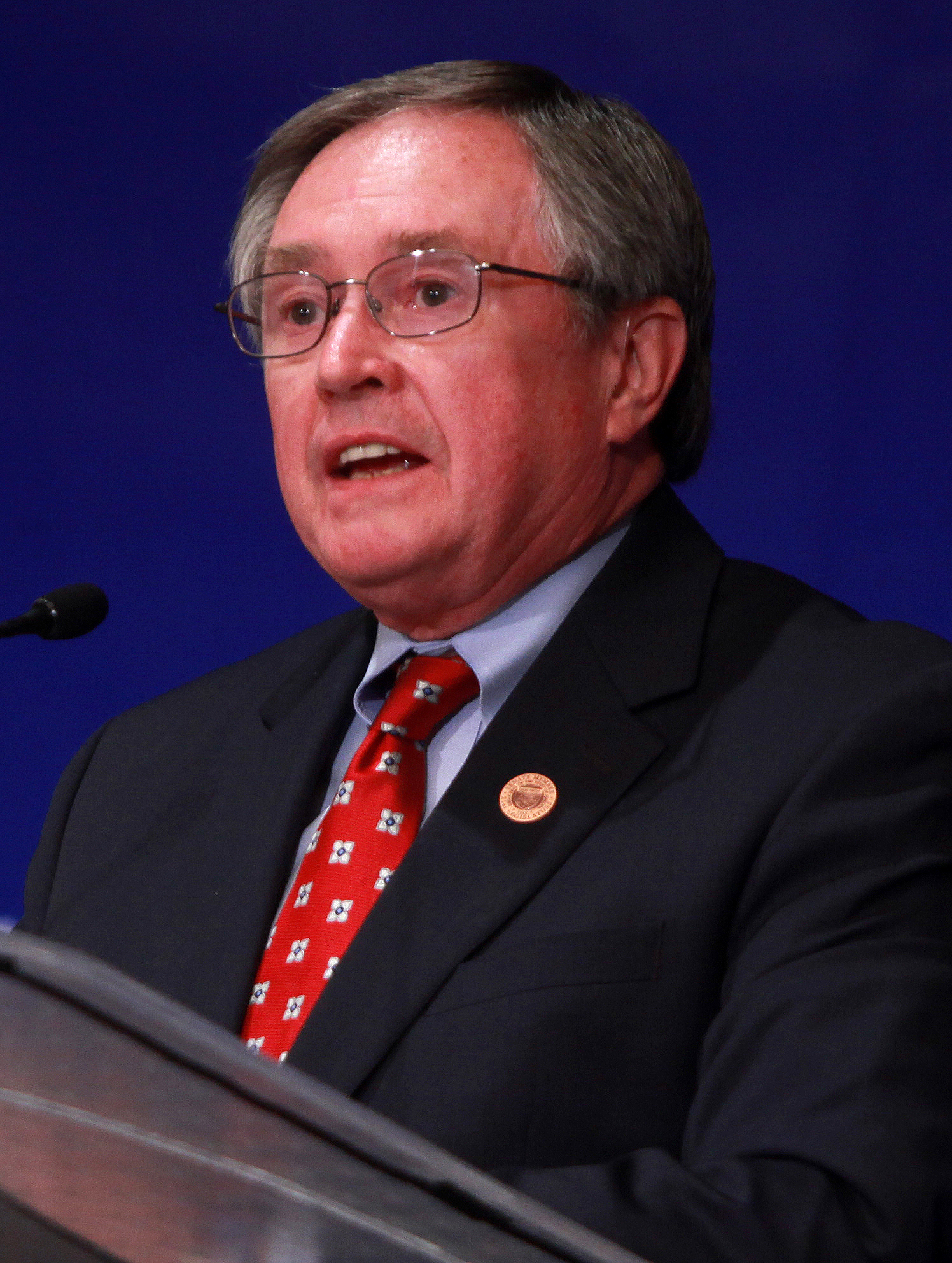
- McComish in 2014

Member of the Arizona Senate from the 18th district
- In office January 14, 2013 – January 5, 2015
- Preceded by: Jerry Lewis

Member of the Arizona Senate from the 20th district
- In office January 10, 2011 – January 14, 2013
- Preceded by: John Huppenthal
- Succeeded by: Kimberly Yee

Member of the Arizona House of Representatives from the 20th district
- In office January 2005 – January 10, 2011 Serving with Bob Robson (2005–2009); Rae Waters (2009–2011)

Personal details
- Born: February 11, 1943 (age 83) Youngstown, Ohio, U.S.
- Party: Republican
- Education: Colgate University
- Website: votemccomish.com

John McComish (born February 11, 1943) is an American politician and formerly a Republican member of the Arizona Senate representing District 18 from January 2013 to January 2015. McComish served multiple terms consecutively in the Arizona State Legislature from January 2005 until January 10, 2011, in the Arizona House of Representatives District 20 seat, then in the Arizona Senate in the District 20 seat from January 10, 2011, until January 14, 2013.

== Education ==
McComish earned his BA from Colgate University.

== Elections ==
- 2012 – Redistricted to District 18, and with incumbent Republican Senator Jerry Lewis redistricted to District 26, McComish was unopposed for the Senate August 28, 2012, Republican primary, winning with 17,874 votes, and won the November 6, 2012, general election with 51,084 votes against Democratic nominee Janie Hydrick.
- 2002 – When incumbent Democratic Representatives William Brotherton and Kathi Foster both ran for Arizona Senate and left both District 20 seats open, McComish ran in the four-way September 10, 2002, Republican primary, but lost to John Huppenthal and Bob Robson; in the November 5, 2002, general election, Huppenthal took the first seat and Robson took the second seat ahead of Democratic nominee Jim Torgeson.
- 2004 – When Republican Representative John Huppenthal ran for Arizona Senate and left a District 20 House seat open, McComish and Representative Robson ran in the five-way September 7, 2004, Republican primary; McComish placed third, but replaced Anton Orlich for the four-way November 2, 2004, general election, where McComish took the first seat with 38,059 votes and Representative Robson took the second seat ahead of Democratic nominee Jim Torgeson and Libertarian candidate Joel Beckwith.
- 2006 – McComish and Representative Robson were unopposed for the September 12, 2006, Republican primary; McComish placed first with 6,045 votes and Representative Robson placed second; in the three-way November 7, 2006, general election, McComish took the first seat with 29,531 votes and Representative Robson took the second seat ahead of Libertarian candidate Jack Heald.
- 2008 – With Representative Bob Robson running for Arizona Corporation Commission and leaving a District 20 seat open, McComish ran in the four-way September 2, 2008, Republican primary, and placed second with 5,860 votes; in the three-way November 4, 2008, general election, McComish took the first seat with 39,820 votes and Democratic nominee Rae Waters took the second seat ahead of Republican nominee Jeff Dial; Waters served the one term, but lost re-election; Dial was elected in 2010.
- 2010 – When Republican Senator John Huppenthal ran for Arizona Superintendent of Public Instruction and left the Senate District 20 seat open, McComish was unopposed for both the August 24, 2010, Republican primary, winning with 16,566 votes, and the November 2, 2010, general election, winning with 39,105 votes.
