= Stephen Tully (politician) =

American politician

Member of the Arizona House of Representatives from the 24th district
- In office January 2001 – January 2003
- Preceded by: Tom Horne

Member of the Arizona House of Representatives from the 11th district
- In office January 2003 – January 2007
- Succeeded by: Mark DeSimone; Adam Driggs

Personal details
- Party: Republican
- Spouse: Kirsten
- Profession: Politician

Stephen Tully is a former member of the Arizona House of Representatives from January 2001 until January 2007. He was first elected to the House in November 2000, representing District 24. After redistricting in 2002, Tully was reelected in both 2002, now representing District 11, and was re-elected in 2004, Tully did not run for re-election in 2006.
