= Steve Yarbrough (politician) =

American politician (born 1947)

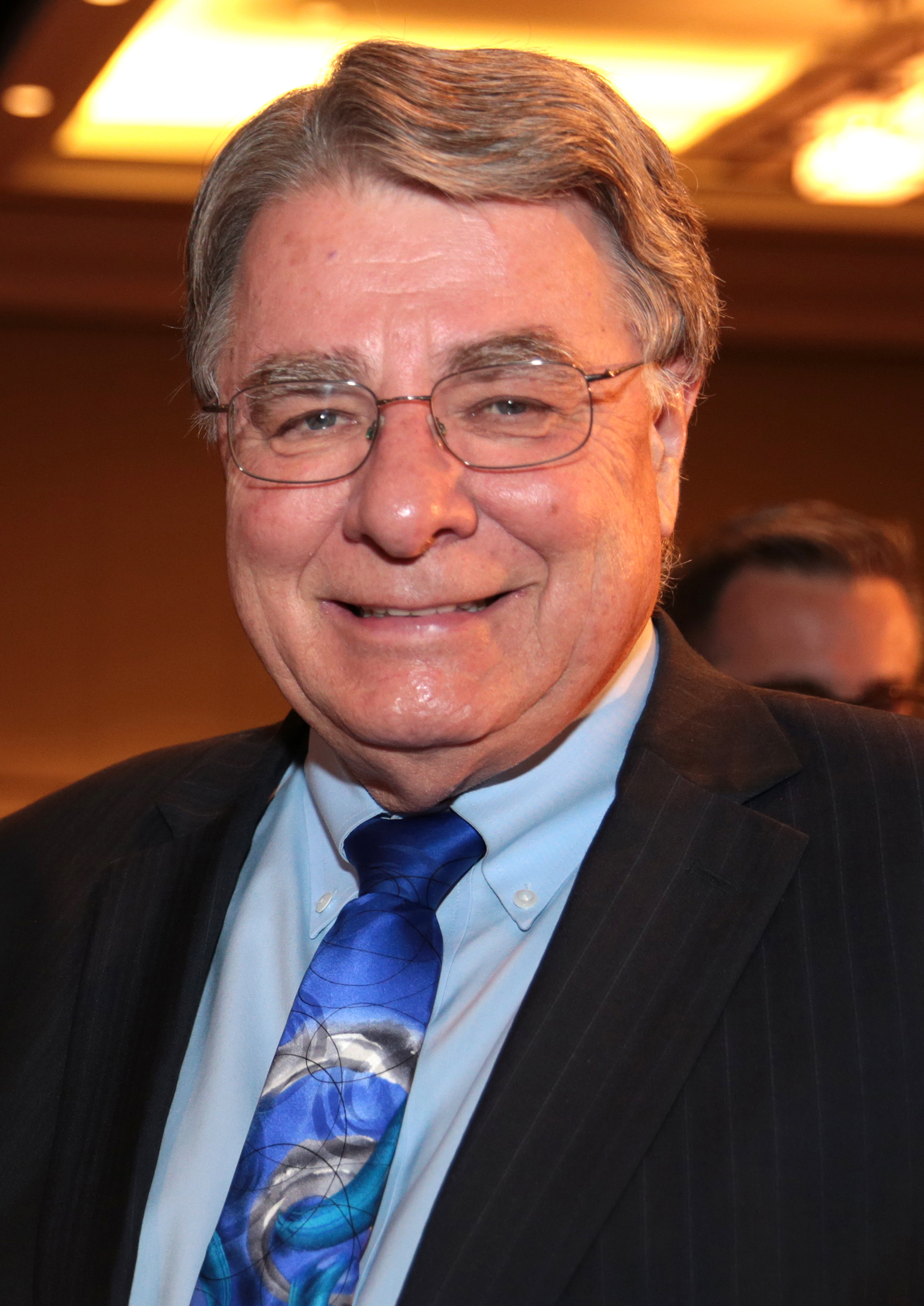
- Yarbrough in 2017

President of the Arizona Senate
- In office January 9, 2017 – January 14, 2019
- Preceded by: Andy Biggs
- Succeeded by: Karen Fann

Member of the Arizona Senate from the 17th district
- In office January 14, 2013 – January 14, 2019
- Preceded by: Jay Tibshraeny
- Succeeded by: J. D. Mesnard

Member of the Arizona Senate from the 21st district
- In office January 10, 2011 – January 14, 2013
- Preceded by: Jay Tibshraeny
- Succeeded by: Rick Murphy

Member of the Arizona House of Representatives from the 21st district
- In office January 2003 – January 10, 2011 Serving with Warde Nichols
- Preceded by: ???
- Succeeded by: Tom Forese

Personal details
- Born: August 26, 1947 (age 79)
- Party: Republican
- Education: Arizona State University, Tempe (BS, JD)

Steven B. Yarbrough (born August 26, 1947) is an American politician. A Republican, he was the president of the Arizona Senate, and represented District 17 from January 14, 2013 to January 14, 2019. Yarbrough served in the Arizona State Legislature from January 2003 until January 2011 in the Arizona House of Representatives District 21 seat, then in the Arizona Senate in the District 21 seat from January 10, 2011 until January 14, 2013 for his first term in the Senate. This District was renumbered from 21 to 17 in 2012, although it remained substantially the same geographically.

== Private school tuition tax credit programs ==
Yarbrough has sponsored the majority of Arizona legislation expanding programs to redirect state income tax liability to tax credits that can be applied toward tuition scholarships for students attending private elementary and secondary schools (scholarship tax credits). Yarbrough is also the director of one of the largest of those programs, the Arizona Christian School Tuition Organization, from which Yarbrough (the chairman of the AZ Senate Ethics Committee) also receives administration fees, processing fees, and rent.

== Education ==
Yarbrough earned his BS in business administration and finance from Arizona State University and his JD from the Arizona State University College of Law (now the Sandra Day O'Connor College of Law).

== Arizona senate ==
=== Elections ===
- 2012 Redistricted to District 17, and with incumbent Republican Senator Jay Tibshraeny leaving the Legislature, Yarbrough was unopposed for the Senate August 28, 2012 Republican Primary, winning with 17,615 votes, and won the November 6, 2012 General election with 48,581 votes against Democratic nominee Bill Gates.
- 2002 When incumbent Republican Representatives Marilyn Jarrett ran for Arizona Senate and Dean Cooley left the Legislature leaving both District 21 seats open, Yarbrough ran in the three-way September 10, 2002 Republican Primary, placing first with 7,672 votes; in the November 5, 2002 General election, Yarbrough took the first seat with 24,824 votes and fellow Republican nominee Warde Nichols took the second seat ahead of Democratic nominee Ken Moore.
- 2004 Yarbrough and Representative Nichols were challenged in the three-way September 7, 2004 Republican Primary; Yarbrough placed first with 10,579 votes and Representative Nichols placed second; they were unopposed for the November 2, 2004 General election, where Yarbrough took the first seat with 50,125 votes and Representative Nichols took the second seat.
- 2006 Yarbrough and Representative Nichols were challenged in the three-way September 12, 2006 Republican Primary; Yarbrough placed first with 9,160 votes and Representative Nichols placed second; in the three-way November 7, 2006 General election, Yarbrough took the first seat with 34,703 votes and Representative Nichols took the second seat ahead of Democratic nominee Phil Hettmansperger.
- 2008 Yarbrough, Representative Nichols, and their 2006 Democratic challenger Phil Hettmansperger were unopposed for their September 2, 2008 primaries, setting up a rematch; Yarbrough and Representative Nichols won the November 2, 2010 General election, where Yarbrough took the first seat with 56,980 votes and Representative Nichols took the second seat ahead of Hettmansperger. Nichols left after the term, having served alongside Yarbrough from 2003 until 2011.
- 2010 When Republican Senator Jay Tibshraeny retired and left the Senate District 21 seat open, Yarbrough was unopposed for both the August 24, 2010 Republican Primary, winning with 24,033 votes, and the November 2, 2010 General election, winning with 54,339 votes.

=== Tenure ===
Yarbrough proposed Arizona SB 1062. It was one of several similar bills in U.S. state legislatures allowing individuals to refuse service based on religion, with some bills specifically protecting religious disapproval of same-sex marriage. The bill was passed by the Republican-controlled state legislature and vetoed by Republican Governor Jan Brewer on February 26, 2014.

Political offices
Preceded by Andy Biggs	President of the Arizona Senate; 2017–2019	Succeeded by Karen Fann
