= Gary Pierce =

American politician

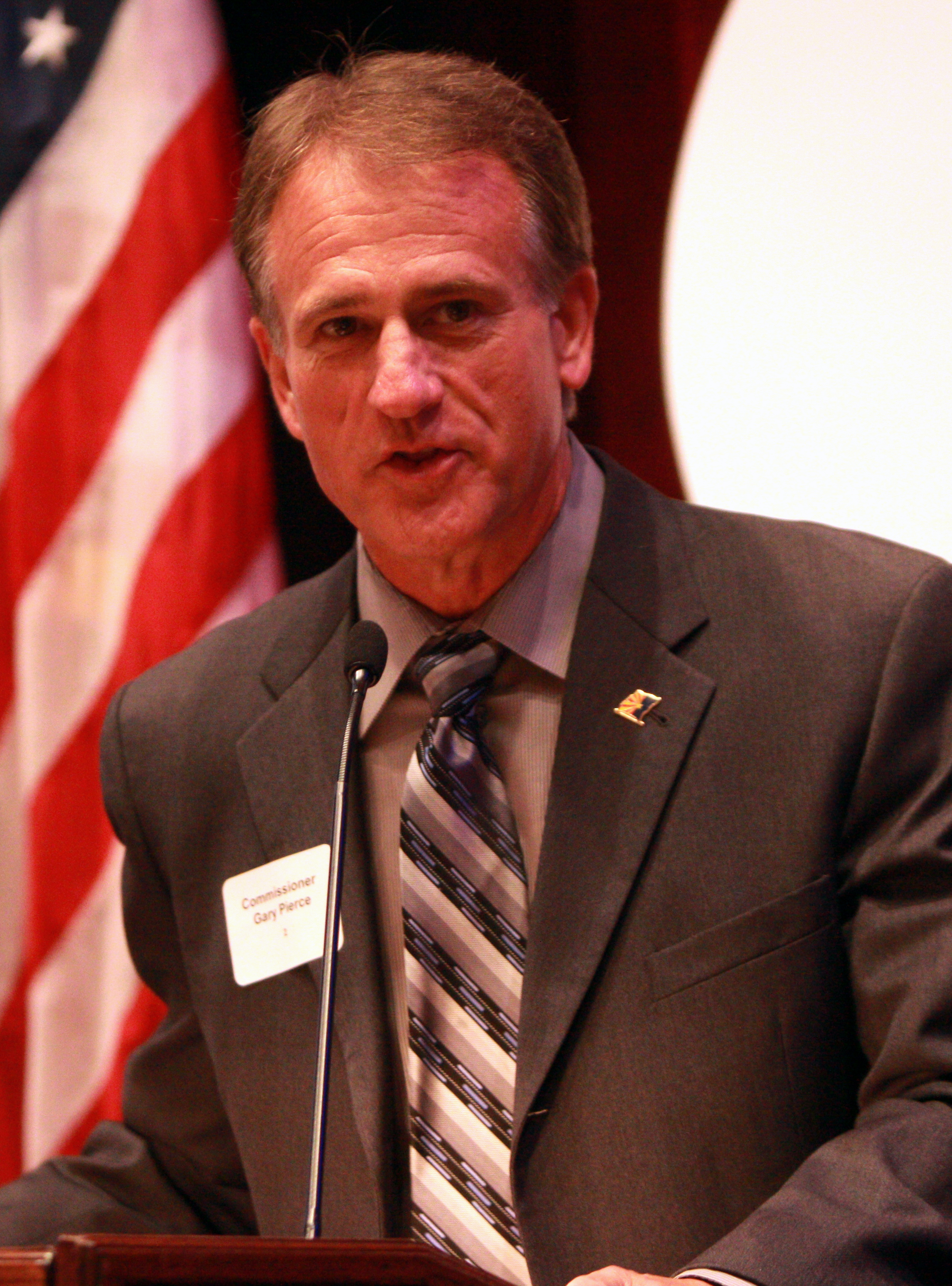
- Pierce in 2013

Arizona Corporation Commissioner

Member of the Arizona House of Representatives
- In office 2006–2015

Personal details
- Born: 1952 (age 73–74) Illinois, U.S.
- Education: Arizona State University

Gary L. Pierce (born c. 1952) is a former Arizona Corporation Commissioner and a former member of the Arizona House of Representatives.

== Political career ==
In the House of Representatives, Mr. Pierce served as the Majority Whip (2005–2006). He was a member of the Rules, Environment, and Federal Mandates and Property Rights committees. He had previously served on the Judiciary Committee and others.

Prior to his election to the Legislature he was twice elected to the Yuma County Board of Supervisors.

The Maricopa (County) Association of Government's awarded Gary Pierce (R-Mesa, Arizona) the coveted Peak Award (Summit Award) in 2004. In their citation they state "Representative Gary Pierce was instrumental in guiding the $15.8 billion Regional Transportation Plan through the legislative process. He sponsored House Bill 2292, which laid the framework for the planning process and formalized the Transportation Policy Committee in state law. To help legislators keep abreast of developments, Representative Pierce created the Joint Ad Hoc Committee on the Maricopa County Regional Transportation Plan, a bicameral, bipartisan committee made up of lawmakers interested in transportation issues. His leadership helped advance House Bill 2456, calling for a continuation of the half-cent sales tax for transportation, after it stalled in a Senate subcommittee. His efforts are credited with the ultimate approval by the legislature of an election that will allow voters to decide their transportation future."

His record of public service includes serving on the Governor's Commission on National and Community Service from 1994 to 1997 and on the Arizona Housing Commission in 1996 and 1997. He also served on the Maricopa County Planning and Zoning Commission and the Maricopa County Department of Transportation Advisory Board. In Yuma, he served two years on the City Board of Adjustment.

The Arizona Republican Party unanimously selected Gary Pierce as a candidate for the Arizona Corporation Commission (ACC). He replaced ACC candidate Marc Spitzer who withdrew when he was appointed to the Federal Energy Regulatory Committee (July 2006).

== Legal Issues ==
In 2015 the FBI opened a long-term investigation related to the financing of certain statewide races in the 2014 election cycle that allegedly influenced the regulators who decide how much consumers will pay for power. This investigation specifically centered around alleged so-called "dark money" campaign contributions from the utility company Arizona Public Service's (APS) in the 2014 Corporation Commission race. Pierce was interviewed by the FBI in the course of this investigation.

On May 25, 2017 Gary Pierce and his wife Sherry were indicted in federal court on felony conspiracy, bribery, mail fraud and five counts of wire fraud. The indictment alleged that Pierce, his wife and utility owner George Johnson conspired to have Johnson pay the Pierce couple by channeling the money through longtime Capitol lobbyist Jim Norton, who at times lobbied on Johnson's behalf, and an "unindicted coconspirator" in exchange for Pierce's votes.

On July 17, 2018, a federal judge declared a mistrial in the Pierce's case after the jury informed the judge that it was deadlocked. A majority of the jurors believed the Pierces were innocent. On August 7, 2018, the government announced it would not seek a retrial and instead moved to dismiss the case.

== Personal life ==
Gary was born in Illinois and moved to Mesa, Arizona with his family in 1960. He attended Emerson, Lincoln, Mesa Junior and Mesa High School, graduating in 1970. A track scholarship provided an education at Mesa Community College where he graduated in 1972. Moving on to Arizona State University, he graduated in 1974 with a bachelor's degree in Education.

For three years Pierce taught at Taft Elementary School in Mesa. A career in the automobile business followed his teaching experience, which culminated as a Honda and Nissan new car dealer in Yuma, Arizona. Concurrently with his new automobile dealerships, Gary owned a Shell gas station and Budget Rent-A-Car franchise. Upon selling his businesses he became involved in local politics.

Gary is married to Sherry (Moore), a Mesa, Arizona native, since 1973. They have four sons. He is a member of the Church of Jesus Christ of Latter-day Saints.
