= Nancy McLain =

American politician

Member of the Arizona House of Representatives from the 3rd district
- In office January 10, 2005 – December 31, 2012
- Preceded by: Joe Hart
- Succeeded by: Sonny Borrelli (in District 5 after redistricting)

Personal details
- Born: January 17, 1945 (age 81)
- Party: Republican

Nancy McLain (born January 17, 1945) is an American former Republican member of the Arizona House of Representatives, representing Arizona Legislative District 3. She served from January 2005 until January 2013.
