= 2002 Arizona House of Representatives election =

- November 5, 2002

All 60 seats in the Arizona House 31 seats needed for a majority
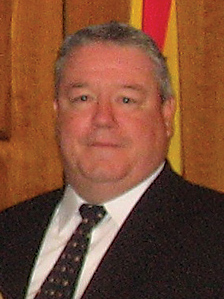

| | Majority party | Minority party |
|---|---|---|
| Leader | Jim Weiers (retired) | Ken Cheuvront (retired) |
| Party | Republican | Democratic |
| Leader's seat | 10th - Phoenix | 15th - Phoenix |
| Last election | 36 | 24 |
| Seats after | 39 | 21 |
| Seat change | ▲3 | ▼3 |
- Results: Democratic hold Democratic gain Republican hold Republican gain
Speaker before election
Jim Weiers
Republican
Elected Speaker
Jake Flake
Republican

The 2002 Arizona House of Representatives election took place on Tuesday, November 5, 2002, with the primary election held on Tuesday, September 10, 2002. Arizona voters elected all 60 members of the Arizona House of Representatives in multi-member districts to serve two-year terms.

The election coincided with United States national elections and Arizona state elections, including U.S. House, Governor, and Arizona Senate.

Following the previous election in 2000, Republicans held a 36-to-24-seat majority over Democrats. Republicans expanded their majority in 2002, winning 39 seats. At 21 members, Democrats experienced a net loss of three seats. The newly elected members served in the 46th Arizona State Legislature, during which Republican Jake Flake was elected as Speaker of the Arizona House. (Note: Jake Flake was elected as Speaker for the 46th legislature by acclamation.)

These were the first elections in Arizona following the 2000 United States redistricting cycle, which resulted in redrawn legislative district boundaries.

== Retiring Incumbents ==
=== Democrats ===
1. District 11: Carmine Cardamone
2. District 11: Noemi Norris (Note: Democratic Representative Debora Norris resigned her Arizona House of Representatives seat on May 24, 2002, to run as a Congressional candidate in the newly redrawn Congressional District 1. Noemi Norris (D) was appointed by the Pima County Board of Supervisors on June 18, 2002 to fill the unexpired term of Debora Norris. Mrs. Noemi Norris was sworn in on July 1, 2002. Noemi Norris was the mother of Debora Norris.)
3. District 13: Richard Miranda (Note: Redistricted from district 22 to 13 then elected to the Arizona State Senate.)
4. District 13: Kathi Foster (Note: Redistricted from district 20 to 13 then ran for the Arizona State Senate, but lost to Richard Miranda in the Democratic primary.)
5. District 14: Marion L. Pickens
6. District 14: Bill Brotherton (Note: Redistricted from district 20 to 14 then elected to the Arizona State Senate.)
7. District 15: Ken Cheuvront (Note: Redistricted from district 25 to 15 then elected to the Arizona State Senate.)
8. District 25: Christine Weason
9. District 28: Gabrielle "Gabby" Giffords (Note: Redistricted from district 13 to 28 then elected to the Arizona State Senate.)

=== Republicans ===
1. District 3: Linda Binder (Note: Redistricted from district 1 to 3 then elected to the Arizona State Senate.)
2. District 7: Wes Marsh (Note: Redistricted from district 28 to 7 then ran for the Arizona State Senate, but lost to Jim Waring in the Republican primary.)
3. District 8: Carolyn S. Allen (Note: Redistricted from district 28 to 8 then elected to the Arizona State Senate.)
4. District 11: Barbara Leff (Note: Redistricted from district 24 to 11 then elected to the Arizona State Senate.)
5. District 12: Robert Blendu (Note: Redistricted from district 15 to 12 then elected to the Arizona State Senate.)
6. District 15: Mike Gleason (Note: Elected to the Arizona Corporation Commission.)
7. District 16: Jim Weiers (Note: Redistricted from district 16 to 10 then elected to the Arizona State Senate.)
8. District 17: Laura Knaperek (Note: Redistricted from district 27 to 17 then ran for the Arizona State Senate, but lost to Democrat Harry Mitchell in the general election.)
9. District 18: Mark Anderson (Note: Redistricted from district 29 to 18 then elected to the Arizona State Senate.)
10. District 19: Roberta Voss (Note: Ran for the Arizona Corporation Commission, but lost to Jim Irvin in the Republican primary.)
11. District 21: Dean Cooley
12. District 26: Jeff Hatch-Miller (Note: Elected to the Arizona Corporation Commission.)

== Incumbents Defeated in Primary Elections ==
=== Democrats ===
1. District 2: James "Jim" Sedillo
2. District 2: Albert Tom (Note: Redistricted from district 3 to 2 then defeated in the Democratic primary.)
3. District 16: Carlos Avelar (Note: Redistricted from district 23 to 16 then defeated in the Democratic primary.)
4. District 23: Mark Clark (Note: Redistricted from district 7 to 23 then defeated in the Democratic primary.)
5. District 25: Mark Maiorana (Note: Redistricted from district 8 to 25 then defeated in the Democratic primary.)

=== Republicans ===
1. District 5: Debra Brimhall (Note: Redistricted from district 4 to 5 then defeated in the Republican primary.)
2. District 10: James Kraft (Note: Redistricted from district 18 to 10 then defeated in the Republican primary.)
3. District 11: Steve May (Note: Redistricted from district 26 to 11 then defeated in the Republican primary.)
4. District 26: Carol Somers (Note: Redistricted from district 13 to 26 then defeated in the Republican primary.)

== Incumbents Defeated in General Elections ==
=== Democrats ===
1. District 1: Henry J. Camarot
2. District 25: Bobby Lugo (Note: Redistricted from district 8 to 25 then defeated in the general election by Republican Jennifer J. Burns and fellow Democrat Manuel V. "Manny" Alvarez.)

=== Republican ===
1. District 28: Edward Poelstra (Note: Redistricted from district 14 to 28 then defeated in the general election by Democrats Ted Downing and David Bradley.)

== Predictions ==
| Source | Ranking | As of |
|---|---|---|
| The Cook; Political Report | Likely R | October 4, 2002 |

== Summary of results ==
Italics denote an open seat held by the incumbent party; bold text denotes a gain for a party.

| District | Incumbent | Party | Elected Representative | Outcome |
|---|---|---|---|---|
| 1st | Linda Binder | Rep | Tom O'Halleran (Note: Redistricted from district 2 to 1.) | Rep Hold |
| 1st | Henry J. Camarot | Dem | **Lucy Mason** | **Rep Gain** |
| 2nd | Tom O'Halleran | Rep | **Sylvia Laughter** (Note: Redistricted from district 3 to 2. Representative Laughter was elected in 2002 as a Democrat; however, she changed political party affiliation to Independent on February 14, 2003.) | **Dem Gain** |
| 2nd | James "Jim" Sedillo | Dem | Jack C. Jackson Jr. | Dem Hold |
| 3rd | Sylvia Laughter | Dem | **Joe Hart** | **Rep Gain** |
| 3rd | Albert Tom | Dem | **Bill Wagner** | **Rep Gain** |
| 4th | Debra Brimhall | Rep | Tom Boone | Rep Hold |
| 4th | Jake Flake (Note: Redistricted from district 4 to 5.) | Rep | Carole Hubbs | Rep Hold |
| 5th | Jim Carruthers (Note: Redistricted from district 5 to 24.) | Rep | Jake Flake | Rep Hold |
| 5th | Robert Cannell (Note: Redistricted from district 5 to 24. Representative Robert C. Cannell was appointed to the Senate on January 24, 2003, by the Yuma County Board of Supervisors to fill the vacancy in District 24. He resigned his House seat and was sworn in as Senator on January 27, 2003. Amanda Aguirre (D) was appointed by the Yuma County Board of Supervisors to fill the House vacancy in District 24 on February 6, 2003 and was sworn in as Representative on February 10, 2003.) | Dem | **Bill Konopnicki** | **Rep Gain** |
| 6th | John Huppenthal (Note: Redistricted from district 6 to 20.) | Rep | Ted Carpenter (Note: Redistricted from district 19 to 6.) | Rep Hold |
| 6th | Bob Robson (Note: Redistricted from district 6 to 20.) | Rep | Clancy Jayne | Rep Hold |
| 7th | Mark Clark | Dem | **John Allen** | **Rep Gain** |
| 7th | Cheryl Chase (Note: Redistricted from district 7 to 23.) | Dem | **Ray Barnes** | **Rep Gain** |
| 8th | Mark Maiorana | Dem | **Michele Reagan** | **Rep Gain** |
| 8th | Bobby Lugo | Dem | **Colette Rosati** | **Rep Gain** |
| 9th | Marian McClure (Note: Redistricted from district 9 to 30.) | Rep | Phil Hanson (Note: Redistricted from district 17 to 9.) | Rep Hold |
| 9th | Randy Graf (Note: Redistricted from district 9 to 30.) | Rep | Bob Stump | Rep Hold |
| 10th | Linda Lopez (Note: Redistricted from district 10 to 29.) | Dem | **Linda Gray** (Note: Redistricted from district 16 to 10.) | **Rep Gain** |
| 10th | Victor Soltero (Note: Redistricted from district 10 to 29. Representative Victor Soltero was appointed to the Senate on January 28, 2003, by the Pima County Board of Supervisors to fill the vacancy in District 29. He resigned his House seat and was sworn in as Senator on January 29, 2003. Tom Prezelski (D) was appointed by the Pima County Board of Supervisors to fill the House vacancy in District 29 on February 11, 2003 and was sworn in as Representative on February 12, 2003.) | Dem | **Doug Quelland** | **Rep Gain** |
| 11th | Carmine Cardamone | Dem | **Deb Gullett** (Note: Redistricted from district 18 to 11.) | **Rep Gain** |
| 11th | Noemi Norris | Dem | **Stephen Tully** (Note: Redistricted from district 24 to 11.) | **Rep Gain** |
| 12th | Steve Huffman (Note: Redistricted from district 12 to 26.) | Rep | John Nelson (Note: Redistricted from district 17 to 12.) | Rep Hold |
| 12th | Pete Hershberger (Note: Redistricted from district 12 to 26.) | Rep | Bill Arnold | Rep Hold |
| 13th | Gabrielle "Gabby" Giffords | Dem | John Loredo (Note: Redistricted from district 22 to 13.) | Dem Hold |
| 13th | Carol Somers | Rep | **Steve Gallardo** | **Dem Gain** |
| 14th | Marion L. Pickens | Dem | Debbie McCune-Davis | Dem Hold |
| 14th | Edward M. Poelstra | Rep | **Robert Meza** | **Dem Gain** |
| 15th | Mike Gleason | Rep | **Ken Clark** | **Dem Gain** |
| 15th | Robert Blendu | Rep | **Wally Straughn** | **Dem Gain** |
| 16th | Jim Weiers | Rep | **Leah Landrum** (Note: Redistricted from district 23 to 16.) | **Dem Gain** |
| 16th | Linda Gray | Rep | **Ben Miranda** | **Dem Gain** |
| 17th | John Nelson | Rep | **Meg Burton Cahill** (Note: Redistricted from district 27 to 17.) | **Dem Gain** |
| 17th | Phil Hanson | Rep | Mark Thompson | Rep Hold |
| 18th | Deb Gullett | Rep | Karen Johnson (Note: Redistricted from district 30 to 18.) | Rep Hold |
| 18th | James Kraft | Rep | Russell Pearce (Note: Redistricted from district 29 to 18.) | Rep Hold |
| 19th | Roberta Voss | Rep | Gary L. Pierce (Note: In 2002, Representative Pierce was redistricted from district 21 to 19. In 2001, Republican Representative Marilyn Jarrett was appointed by the Maricopa County Board of Supervisors on September 11, 2001 to fill the unexpired term of Senator Rusty Bowers (R) in District 21, who resigned his Senate seat on August 27, 2001. Mrs. Jarrett submitted her letter of resignation on September 12 and was sworn in as Senator on the same day. Gary L. Pierce (R) was appointed by the Maricopa County Board of Supervisors on September 24, 2001 to fill the unexpired term of Marilyn Jarrett (R), who resigned on 9/12 to assume the Senate seat from District 21. Mr. Pierce was sworn in as State Representative of District 21 on 9/24.) | Rep Hold |
| 19th | Ted Carpenter | Rep | Chuck Gray | Rep Hold |
| 20th | Kathi Foster | Dem | **John Huppenthal** | **Rep Gain** |
| 20th | Bill Brotherton | Dem | **Bob Robson** | **Rep Gain** |
| 21st | Dean Cooley | Rep | Steve Yarbrough | Rep Hold |
| 21st | Gary L. Pierce | Rep | Warde V. Nichols | Rep Hold |
| 22nd | John Loredo | Dem | **Eddie Farnsworth** (Note: Redistricted from district 30 to 22.) | **Rep Gain** |
| 22nd | Richard Miranda | Dem | **Andy Biggs** | **Rep Gain** |
| 23rd | Leah Landrum | Dem | Cheryl Chase | Dem Hold |
| 23rd | Carlos Avelar | Dem | Ernest Bustamante | Dem Hold |
| 24th | Barbara Leff | Rep | Jim Carruthers | Rep Hold |
| 24th | Stephen Tully | Rep | **Robert Cannell** | **Dem Gain** |
| 25th | Ken Cheuvront | Dem | Manuel V. "Manny" Alvarez | Dem Hold |
| 25th | Christine Weason | Dem | **Jennifer J. Burns** | **Rep Gain** |
| 26th | Jeff Hatch-Miller | Rep | Steve Huffman | Rep Hold |
| 26th | Steve May | Rep | Pete Hershberger | Rep Hold |
| 27th | Laura Knaperek | Rep | **Olivia Cajero Bedford** | **Dem Gain** |
| 27th | Meg Burton Cahill | Dem | Phil Lopes | Dem Hold |
| 28th | Carolyn S. Allen | Rep | **David Bradley** | **Dem Gain** |
| 28th | Wes Marsh | Rep | **Ted Downing** | **Dem Gain** |
| 29th | Mark Anderson | Rep | **Linda Lopez** | **Dem Gain** |
| 29th | Russell Pearce | Rep | **Victor Soltero** | **Dem Gain** |
| 30th | Karen Johnson | Rep | Marian McClure | Rep Hold |
| 30th | Eddie Farnsworth | Rep | Randy Graf | Rep Hold |

== Detailed results ==
Sources for election results:

=== District 1 ===
Primary Election Results
| Party | Candidate | Votes | % |
Democratic Party Primary Results
| Democratic | Henry J. Camarot (incumbent) | 8,619 | 100.00% |
| Total votes | | 8,619 | 100.00% |
Republican Party Primary Results
| Republican | Tom O'Halleran (incumbent) | 11,966 | 40.96% |
| Republican | Lucy Mason | 9,593 | 32.83% |
| Republican | Thom Strawn | 7,657 | 26.21% |
| Total votes | | 29,216 | 100.00% |

General Election Results
| Party | Candidate | Votes | % |
|---|---|---|---|
| Republican | Tom O'Halleran (incumbent) | 30,900 | 36.52% |
| Republican | Lucy Mason | 30,253 | 35.76% |
| Democratic | Henry J. Camarot (incumbent) | 23,452 | 27.72% |
| Total votes | | 84,605 | 100.00% |
| Republican hold | | | |
| Republican gain from Democratic | | | |

=== District 2 ===
Primary Election Results
| Party | Candidate | Votes | % |
Democratic Party Primary Results
| Democratic | Sylvia Laughter (incumbent) | 7,380 | 24.86% |
| Democratic | Jack C. Jackson Jr. | 7,015 | 23.63% |
| Democratic | James J. "Jim" Sedillo (incumbent) | 3,674 | 12.38% |
| Democratic | Bill Cherry | 3,147 | 10.60% |
| Democratic | Tom Shirley | 2,922 | 9.84% |
| Democratic | Aresta Larusso | 2,411 | 8.12% |
| Democratic | Albert Tom (incumbent) | 2,260 | 7.61% |
| Democratic | Oscar Lee House Sr. | 879 | 2.96% |
| Total votes | | 29,688 | 100.00% |
Republican Party Primary Results
| Republican | Wanda MacDonald (Note: The candidate ran a write-in campaign.) (Note: Despite coming in first place in the Republican primary as a write-in candidate, Wanda MacDonald did not advance to the general election.) | 139 | 100.00% |
| Total votes | | 139 | 100.00% |

General Election Results
| Party | Candidate | Votes | % |
|---|---|---|---|
| Democratic | Sylvia Laughter (incumbent) | 24,790 | 50.94% |
| Democratic | Jack C. Jackson Jr. | 23,873 | 49.06% |
| Total votes | | 48,663 | 100.00% |
| Democratic gain from Republican | | | |
| Democratic hold | | | |

=== District 3 ===
Primary Election Results
| Party | Candidate | Votes | % |
Democratic Party Primary Results
| Democratic | Matthew Capalby | 4,014 | 50.87% |
| Democratic | Richard B. Glancy | 3,876 | 49.13% |
| Total votes | | 7,890 | 100.00% |
Republican Party Primary Results
| Republican | Joe Hart | 6,344 | 33.00% |
| Republican | Bill Wagner | 4,902 | 25.50% |
| Republican | Lee Fabrizio | 4,617 | 24.02% |
| Republican | Maury Coburn | 3,362 | 17.49% |
| Total votes | | 19,225 | 100.00% |

General Election Results
| Party | Candidate | Votes | % |
|---|---|---|---|
| Republican | Joe Hart | 20,430 | 32.79% |
| Republican | Bill Wagner | 18,659 | 29.95% |
| Democratic | Matthew Capalby | 12,889 | 20.69% |
| Democratic | Richard B. Glancy | 10,328 | 16.58% |
| Total votes | | 62,306 | 100.00% |
| Republican gain from Democratic | | | |
| Republican gain from Democratic | | | |

=== District 4 ===
Primary Election Results
| Party | Candidate | Votes | % |
Republican Party Primary Results
| Republican | Tom Boone | 8,671 | 31.11% |
| Republican | Carole Hubbs | 7,295 | 26.17% |
| Republican | Judy M. Burges | 6,237 | 22.37% |
| Republican | Ephram Cordova | 5,673 | 20.35% |
| Total votes | | 27,876 | 100.00% |
Democratic Party Primary Results
| Democratic | John D. Mahaney | 5,603 | 100.00% |
| Total votes | | 5,603 | 100.00% |

General Election Results
| Party | Candidate | Votes | % |
|---|---|---|---|
| Republican | Tom Boone | 33,066 | 38.34% |
| Republican | Carole Hubbs | 32,547 | 37.74% |
| Democratic | John D. Mahaney | 20,638 | 23.93% |
| Total votes | | 86,251 | 100.00% |
| Republican hold | | | |
| Republican hold | | | |

=== District 5 ===
Primary Election Results
| Party | Candidate | Votes | % |
Republican Party Primary Results
| Republican | Jake Flake (incumbent) | 8,732 | 43.40% |
| Republican | Bill Konopnicki | 6,649 | 33.05% |
| Republican | Debra Brimhall (incumbent) | 4,738 | 23.55% |
| Total votes | | 20,119 | 100.00% |
Democratic Party Primary Results
| Democratic | Bill Jeffers | 9,016 | 51.41% |
| Democratic | Claudia Maestas | 8,520 | 48.59% |
| Total votes | | 17,536 | 100.00% |

General Election Results
| Party | Candidate | Votes | % |
|---|---|---|---|
| Republican | Jake Flake (incumbent) | 24,686 | 31.61% |
| Republican | Bill Konopnicki | 20,623 | 26.41% |
| Democratic | Bill Jeffers | 17,146 | 21.95% |
| Democratic | Claudia Maestas | 15,642 | 20.03% |
| Total votes | | 78,097 | 100.00% |
| Republican hold | | | |
| Republican gain from Democratic | | | |

=== District 6 ===
Primary Election Results
| Party | Candidate | Votes | % |
Republican Party Primary Results
| Republican | Ted Carpenter (incumbent) | 5,913 | 57.34% |
| Republican | Clancy Jayne | 4,399 | 42.66% |
| Total votes | | 10,312 | 100.00% |
Democratic Party Primary Results
| Democratic | Laurie Larson | 3,064 | 91.60% |
| Democratic | Sharon Lindsay | 281 | 8.40% |
| Total votes | | 3,345 | 100.00% |

General Election Results
| Party | Candidate | Votes | % |
|---|---|---|---|
| Republican | Ted Carpenter (incumbent) | 21,949 | 32.76% |
| Republican | Clancy Jayne | 19,282 | 28.78% |
| Democratic | Laurie Larson | 13,683 | 20.42% |
| Democratic | Sharon Lindsay | 12,083 | 18.04% |
| Total votes | | 66,997 | 100.00% |
| Republican hold | | | |
| Republican hold | | | |

=== District 7 ===
Primary Election Results
| Party | Candidate | Votes | % |
Republican Party Primary Results
| Republican | John Allen | 3,424 | 21.16% |
| Republican | Ray Barnes | 3,154 | 19.49% |
| Republican | Thom Von Hapsburg | 2,889 | 17.85% |
| Republican | Audrey Cohen-Davis | 2,515 | 15.54% |
| Republican | Kenneth F. Miller | 2,338 | 14.45% |
| Republican | Susan Clancy | 1,862 | 11.51% |
| Total votes | | 16,182 | 100.00% |
Democratic Party Primary Results
| Democratic | Virgel Cain | 3,164 | 100.00% |
| Total votes | | 3,164 | 100.00% |

General Election Results
| Party | Candidate | Votes | % |
|---|---|---|---|
| Republican | John Allen | 24,138 | 38.86% |
| Republican | Ray Barnes | 21,563 | 34.72% |
| Democratic | Virgel Cain | 16,408 | 26.42% |
| Total votes | | 62,109 | 100.00% |
| Republican gain from Democratic | | | |
| Republican gain from Democratic | | | |

=== District 8 ===
Primary Election Results
| Party | Candidate | Votes | % |
Republican Party Primary Results
| Republican | Michele Reagan | 6,348 | 24.20% |
| Republican | Colette Rosati | 4,722 | 18.00% |
| Republican | Ron McCullagh | 4,554 | 17.36% |
| Republican | Robert Ditchey | 4,004 | 15.26% |
| Republican | Scott Steingard | 3,459 | 13.19% |
| Republican | Kathleen Gillis | 3,146 | 11.99% |
| Total votes | | 26,233 | 100.00% |
Democratic Party Primary Results
| Democratic | Ginny Chin | 4,601 | 100.00% |
| Total votes | | 4,601 | 100.00% |

General Election Results
| Party | Candidate | Votes | % |
|---|---|---|---|
| Republican | Michele Reagan | 33,251 | 39.68% |
| Republican | Colette Rosati | 25,607 | 30.56% |
| Democratic | Ginny Chin | 24,946 | 29.77% |
| Total votes | | 83,804 | 100.00% |
| Republican gain from Democratic | | | |
| Republican gain from Democratic | | | |

=== District 9 ===
Primary Election Results
| Party | Candidate | Votes | % |
Republican Party Primary Results
| Republican | Bob Stump | 10,035 | 47.86% |
| Republican | Phil Hanson (incumbent) | 6,195 | 29.55% |
| Republican | David Fraley | 2,524 | 12.04% |
| Republican | Jerry Cuendet | 2,213 | 10.55% |
| Total votes | | 20,967 | 100.00% |
Democratic Party Primary Results
| Democratic | Shirley McAllister | 4,534 | 56.02% |
| Democratic | Peter Hershfield | 3,560 | 43.98% |
| Total votes | | 8,094 | 100.00% |

General Election Results
| Party | Candidate | Votes | % |
|---|---|---|---|
| Republican | Bob Stump | 27,973 | 34.14% |
| Republican | Phil Hanson (incumbent) | 23,455 | 28.63% |
| Democratic | Shirley McAllister | 17,026 | 20.78% |
| Democratic | Peter Hershfield | 13,474 | 16.45% |
| Total votes | | 81,928 | 100.00% |
| Republican hold | | | |
| Republican hold | | | |

=== District 10 ===
Primary Election Results
| Party | Candidate | Votes | % |
Republican Party Primary Results
| Republican | Linda Gray (incumbent) | 5,076 | 39.24% |
| Republican | Doug Quelland | 3,319 | 25.66% |
| Republican | James Kraft (incumbent) | 2,608 | 20.16% |
| Republican | Bev Cuthbertson | 1,933 | 14.94% |
| Total votes | | 12,936 | 100.00% |
Democratic Party Primary Results
| Democratic | Jackie Thrasher | 3,006 | 57.84% |
| Democratic | Christian Frandsen | 2,191 | 42.16% |
| Total votes | | 5,197 | 100.00% |

General Election Results
| Party | Candidate | Votes | % |
|---|---|---|---|
| Republican | Linda Gray (incumbent) | 16,741 | 31.68% |
| Republican | Doug Quelland | 14,337 | 27.13% |
| Democratic | Jackie Thrasher | 11,738 | 22.21% |
| Democratic | Christian Frandsen | 10,033 | 18.98% |
| Total votes | | 52,849 | 100.00% |
| Republican gain from Democratic | | | |
| Republican gain from Democratic | | | |

=== District 11 ===
Primary Election Results
| Party | Candidate | Votes | % |
Republican Party Primary Results
| Republican | Stephen Tully (incumbent) | 8,294 | 33.85% |
| Republican | Deb Gullett (incumbent) | 8,133 | 33.19% |
| Republican | Steve May (incumbent) | 8,075 | 32.96% |
| Total votes | | 24,502 | 100.00% |
Democratic Party Primary Results
| Democratic | Sam Wercinski | 5,099 | 58.44% |
| Democratic | Peter Morkert | 3,626 | 41.56% |
| Total votes | | 8,725 | 100.00% |

General Election Results
| Party | Candidate | Votes | % |
|---|---|---|---|
| Republican | Deb Gullett (incumbent) | 31,752 | 32.75% |
| Republican | Stephen Tully (incumbent) | 29,011 | 29.92% |
| Democratic | Sam Wercinski | 21,526 | 22.20% |
| Democratic | Peter Morkert | 14,677 | 15.14% |
| Total votes | | 96,966 | 100.00% |
| Republican gain from Democratic | | | |
| Republican gain from Democratic | | | |

=== District 12 ===
Primary Election Results
| Party | Candidate | Votes | % |
Republican Party Primary Results
| Republican | John Nelson (incumbent) | 3,934 | 32.27% |
| Republican | Bill Arnold | 3,590 | 29.45% |
| Republican | Jerry P. Weiers | 3,092 | 25.36% |
| Republican | Gary Cox | 1,576 | 12.93% |
| Total votes | | 12,192 | 100.00% |
Democratic Party Primary Results
| Democratic | Ron Henry | 2,197 | 38.16% |
| Democratic | Leonard A. Clark | 1,847 | 32.08% |
| Democratic | Ted Murphree | 1,713 | 29.76% |
| Total votes | | 5,757 | 100.00% |

General Election Results
| Party | Candidate | Votes | % |
|---|---|---|---|
| Republican | John Nelson (incumbent) | 19,110 | 32.34% |
| Republican | Bill Arnold | 17,722 | 29.99% |
| Democratic | Ron Henry | 11,761 | 19.90% |
| Democratic | Leonard A. Clark | 10,501 | 17.77% |
| Total votes | | 59,094 | 100.00% |
| Republican hold | | | |
| Republican hold | | | |

=== District 13 ===
Primary Election Results
| Party | Candidate | Votes | % |
Democratic Party Primary Results
| Democratic | Steve Gallardo | 2,525 | 53.79% |
| Democratic | John Loredo (incumbent) | 2,169 | 46.21% |
| Total votes | | 4,694 | 100.00% |

General Election Results
| Party | Candidate | Votes | % |
|---|---|---|---|
| Democratic | Steve Gallardo | 8,985 | 53.26% |
| Democratic | John Loredo (incumbent) | 7,885 | 46.74% |
| Total votes | | 16,870 | 100.00% |
| Democratic hold | | | |
| Democratic gain from Republican | | | |

=== District 14 ===
Primary Election Results
| Party | Candidate | Votes | % |
Democratic Party Primary Results
| Democratic | Debbie McCune-Davis | 2,995 | 40.34% |
| Democratic | Robert Meza | 2,645 | 35.63% |
| Democratic | Peter Moraga | 1,784 | 24.03% |
| Total votes | | 7,424 | 100.00% |
Republican Party Primary Results
| Republican | John C. Atkins | 1,634 | 58.19% |
| Republican | Mary Carr | 1,174 | 41.81% |
| Total votes | | 2,808 | 100.00% |

General Election Results
| Party | Candidate | Votes | % |
|---|---|---|---|
| Democratic | Debbie McCune-Davis | 9,173 | 33.35% |
| Democratic | Robert Meza | 8,946 | 32.52% |
| Republican | John C. Atkins | 4,981 | 18.11% |
| Republican | Mary Carr | 4,405 | 16.02% |
| Total votes | | 27,505 | 100.000% |
| Democratic hold | | | |
| Democratic gain from Republican | | | |

=== District 15 ===
Primary Election Results
| Party | Candidate | Votes | % |
Democratic Party Primary Results
| Democratic | Ken Clark | 3,976 | 62.57% |
| Democratic | Wally Straughn | 2,326 | 36.61% |
| Democratic | Bob Rosenberg | 52 | 0.82% |
| Total votes | | 6,354 | 100.00% |
Republican Party Primary Results
| Republican | Milton Wheat | 3,045 | 85.70% |
| Republican | William Wheat | 264 | 7.43% |
| Republican | David Lujan | 244 | 6.87% |
| Total votes | | 3,553 | 100.00% |

General Election Results
| Party | Candidate | Votes | % |
|---|---|---|---|
| Democratic | Ken Clark | 10,873 | 30.24% |
| Democratic | Wally Straughn | 8,109 | 22.55% |
| Republican | Milton Wheat | 7,163 | 19.92% |
| Republican | William Wheat | 6,868 | 19.10% |
| Independent Green | Kyrsten Sinema (Note: Sinema ran as an independent affiliated with the Green Party, though her party affiliation was listed as "(KYRSTEN SINEMA)" in official election results in 2002.) | 2,945 | 8.19% |
| Total votes | | 35,958 | 100.00% |
| Democratic gain from Republican | | | |
| Democratic gain from Republican | | | |

=== District 16 ===
Primary Election Results
| Party | Candidate | Votes | % |
Democratic Party Primary Results
| Democratic | Ben Miranda | 3,116 | 39.87% |
| Democratic | Leah Landrum (incumbent) | 2,722 | 34.83% |
| Democratic | Carlos Avelar (incumbent) | 1,977 | 25.30% |
| Total votes | | 7,815 | 100.00% |

General Election Results
| Party | Candidate | Votes | % |
|---|---|---|---|
| Democratic | Ben Miranda | 9,600 | 50.38% |
| Democratic | Leah Landrum (incumbent) | 9,454 | 49.62% |
| Total votes | | 19,054 | 100.00% |
| Democratic gain from Republican | | | |
| Democratic gain from Republican | | | |

=== District 17 ===
Primary Election Results
| Party | Candidate | Votes | % |
Democratic Party Primary Results
| Democratic | Meg Burton Cahill (incumbent) | 3,966 | 43.16% |
| Democratic | Darlene Pany | 2,951 | 32.11% |
| Democratic | Phil Amorosi | 2,273 | 24.73% |
| Total votes | | 9,190 | 100.00% |
Republican Party Primary Results
| Republican | Mark Thompson | 4,492 | 32.49% |
| Republican | Dale Despain | 3,625 | 26.22% |
| Republican | Michelle Helm | 3,112 | 22.51% |
| Republican | Geoff Shell | 2,595 | 18.77% |
| Total votes | | 13,824 | 100.00% |
Libertarian Party Primary Results
| Libertarian | Trevor O. Clevenger | 81 | 50.63% |
| Libertarian | Paul Dedonati | 79 | 49.38% |
| Total votes | | 160 | 100.00% |

General Election Results
| Party | Candidate | Votes | % |
|---|---|---|---|
| Democratic | Meg Burton Cahill (incumbent) | 17,901 | 25.90% |
| Republican | Mark Thompson | 16,785 | 24.29% |
| Republican | Dale Despain | 15,656 | 22.65% |
| Democratic | Darlene Pany | 15,507 | 22.44% |
| Libertarian | Paul Dedonati | 1,690 | 2.45% |
| Libertarian | Trevor O. Clevenger | 1,572 | 2.27% |
| Total votes | | 69,111 | 100.00% |
| Democratic gain from Republican | | | |
| Republican hold | | | |

=== District 18 ===
Primary Election Results
| Party | Candidate | Votes | % |
Republican Party Primary Results
| Republican | Russell Pearce (incumbent) | 7,163 | 53.50% |
| Republican | Karen Johnson (incumbent) | 6,226 | 46.50% |
| Total votes | | 13,389 | 100.00% |

General Election Results
| Party | Candidate | Votes | % |
|---|---|---|---|
| Republican | Karen Johnson (incumbent) | 17,907 | 51.81% |
| Republican | Russell Pearce (incumbent) | 16,653 | 48.19% |
| Total votes | | 34,560 | 100.00% |
| Republican hold | | | |
| Republican hold | | | |

=== District 19 ===
Primary Election Results
| Party | Candidate | Votes | % |
Republican Party Primary Results
| Republican | Gary Pierce (incumbent) | 8,141 | 33.37% |
| Republican | Chuck Gray | 7,139 | 29.26% |
| Republican | Leslie Kelly | 5,180 | 21.23% |
| Republican | Louise Daggs | 3,938 | 16.14% |
| Total votes | | 24,398 | 100.00% |

General Election Results
| Party | Candidate | Votes | % |
|---|---|---|---|
| Republican | Chuck Gray | 31,991 | 54.76% |
| Republican | Gary Pierce (incumbent) | 26,432 | 45.24% |
| Total votes | | 58,423 | 100.00% |
| Republican hold | | | |
| Republican hold | | | |

=== District 20 ===
Primary Election Results
| Party | Candidate | Votes | % |
Republican Party Primary Results
| Republican | John Huppenthal (incumbent) | 6,115 | 38.70% |
| Republican | Bob Robson (incumbent) | 4,278 | 27.08% |
| Republican | John McComish | 3,274 | 20.72% |
| Republican | John Fan | 2,133 | 13.50% |
| Total votes | | 15,800 | 100.00% |
Democratic Party Primary Results
| Democratic | Jim Torgeson | 3,311 | 100.00% |
| Total votes | | 3,311 | 100.00% |

General Election Results
| Party | Candidate | Votes | % |
|---|---|---|---|
| Republican | John Huppenthal (incumbent) | 24,738 | 39.99% |
| Republican | Bob Robson (incumbent) | 20,794 | 33.62% |
| Democratic | Jim Torgeson | 16,327 | 26.39% |
| Total votes | | 61,859 | 100.00% |
| Republican gain from Democratic | | | |
| Republican gain from Democratic | | | |

=== District 21 ===
Primary Election Results
| Party | Candidate | Votes | % |
Republican Party Primary Results
| Republican | Steve Yarbrough | 7,672 | 47.64% |
| Republican | Warde V. Nichols | 4,783 | 29.70% |
| Republican | Tara Plese | 3,648 | 22.65% |
| Total votes | | 16,103 | 100.00% |
Democratic Party Primary Results
| Democratic | Ken Moore | 3,763 | 100.00% |
| Total votes | | 3,763 | 100.00% |

General Election Results
| Party | Candidate | Votes | % |
|---|---|---|---|
| Republican | Steve Yarbrough | 24,824 | 40.02% |
| Republican | Warde V. Nichols | 19,571 | 31.55% |
| Democratic | Ken Moore | 17,634 | 28.43% |
| Total votes | | 62,029 | 100.00% |
| Republican hold | | | |
| Republican hold | | | |

=== District 22 ===
Primary Election Results
| Party | Candidate | Votes | % |
Republican Party Primary Results
| Republican | Eddie Farnsworth (incumbent) | 6,917 | 32.21% |
| Republican | Andy Biggs | 5,778 | 26.91% |
| Republican | Roberta S. Livesay | 3,579 | 16.67% |
| Republican | Robert (Bob) Martin | 3,243 | 15.10% |
| Republican | Loren Hatch | 1,955 | 9.10% |
| Total votes | | 21,472 | 100.00% |
Democratic Party Primary Results
| Democratic | Janet Reber (Note: Despite coming in first place in the Democratic primary as a write-in candidate, Janet Reber did not advance to the general election.) | 324 | 100.00% |
| Total votes | | 324 | 100.00% |

General Election Results
| Party | Candidate | Votes | % |
|---|---|---|---|
| Republican | Andy Biggs | 31,812 | 53.52% |
| Republican | Eddie Farnsworth (incumbent) | 27,630 | 46.48% |
| Total votes | | 59,442 | 100.00% |
| Republican gain from Democratic | | | |
| Republican gain from Democratic | | | |

=== District 23 ===
Primary Election Results
| Party | Candidate | Votes | % |
Democratic Party Primary Results
| Democratic | Ernest Bustamante | 5,063 | 35.95% |
| Democratic | Cheryl Chase (incumbent) | 4,916 | 34.90% |
| Democratic | Mark Clark (incumbent) | 4,106 | 29.15% |
| Total votes | | 14,085 | 100.00% |
Republican Party Primary Results
| Republican | Brett Benedict | 3,587 | 100.00% |
| Total votes | | 3,587 | 100.00% |

General Election Results
| Party | Candidate | Votes | % |
|---|---|---|---|
| Democratic | Cheryl Chase (incumbent) | 15,072 | 36.73% |
| Democratic | Ernest Bustamante | 13,319 | 32.46% |
| Republican | Brett Benedict | 12,638 | 30.80% |
| Total votes | | 41,029 | 100.00% |
| Democratic hold | | | |
| Democratic hold | | | |

=== District 24 ===
Primary Election Results
| Party | Candidate | Votes | % |
Republican Party Primary Results
| Republican | James R. "Jim" Carruthers (incumbent) | 5,502 | 100.00% |
| Total votes | | 5,502 | 100.00% |
Democratic Party Primary Results
| Democratic | Robert Cannell (incumbent) | 5,480 | 100.00% |
| Total votes | | 5,480 | 100.00% |
Libertarian Party Primary Results
| Libertarian | Patty Kelly | 16 | 100.00% |
| Total votes | | 16 | 100.00% |

General Election Results
| Party | Candidate | Votes | % |
|---|---|---|---|
| Democratic | Robert Cannell (incumbent) | 13,611 | 44.73% |
| Republican | James R. "Jim" Carruthers (incumbent) | 13,216 | 43.43% |
| Libertarian | Patty Kelly | 3,605 | 11.85% |
| Total votes | | 30,432 | 100.00% |
| Democratic gain from Republican | | | |
| Republican hold | | | |

=== District 25 ===
Primary Election Results
| Party | Candidate | Votes | % |
Democratic Party Primary Results
| Democratic | Manuel V. "Manny" Alvarez | 5,900 | 34.91% |
| Democratic | Bobby Lugo (incumbent) | 4,370 | 25.86% |
| Democratic | Ruth Wilson | 3,436 | 20.33% |
| Democratic | "Mark" Maiorana (incumbent) | 3,195 | 18.90% |
| Total votes | | 16,901 | 100.00% |
Republican Party Primary Results
| Republican | Jennifer J. Burns | 5,823 | 92.68% |
| Republican | David Stevens | 460 | 7.32% |
| Total votes | | 6,283 | 100.00% |

General Election Results
| Party | Candidate | Votes | % |
|---|---|---|---|
| Democratic | Manuel V. "Manny" Alvarez | 16,378 | 28.33% |
| Republican | Jennifer J. Burns | 14,362 | 24.84% |
| Democratic | Bobby Lugo (incumbent) | 14,145 | 24.46% |
| Republican | David Stevens | 12,934 | 22.37% |
| Total votes | | 57,819 | 100.00% |
| Democratic hold | | | |
| Republican gain from Democratic | | | |

=== District 26 ===
Primary Election Results
| Party | Candidate | Votes | % |
Republican Party Primary Results
| Republican | Steve Huffman (incumbent) | 8,493 | 33.85% |
| Republican | Pete Hershberger (incumbent) | 7,230 | 28.81% |
| Republican | Carol Somers (incumbent) | 7,130 | 28.42% |
| Republican | Stuart Watkins | 2,239 | 8.92% |
| Total votes | | 25,092 | 100.00% |
Libertarian Party Primary Results
| Libertarian | Robert W. Quilici | 15 | 100.00% |
| Total votes | | 15 | 100.00% |

General Election Results
| Party | Candidate | Votes | % |
|---|---|---|---|
| Republican | Pete Hershberger (incumbent) | 37,327 | 45.66% |
| Republican | Steve Huffman (incumbent) | 36,891 | 45.13% |
| Libertarian | Robert W. Quilici | 7,534 | 9.22% |
| Total votes | | 81,752 | 100.00% |
| Republican hold | | | |
| Republican hold | | | |

=== District 27 ===
Primary Election Results
| Party | Candidate | Votes | % |
Democratic Party Primary Results
| Democratic | Olivia Cajero Bedford | 4,436 | 22.37% |
| Democratic | Phil Lopes | 3,980 | 20.07% |
| Democratic | Sally Ann Gonzales | 3,632 | 18.31% |
| Democratic | Peter Hormel | 3,479 | 17.54% |
| Democratic | Jesse George | 2,617 | 13.20% |
| Democratic | Val Romero | 1,687 | 8.51% |
| Total votes | | 19,831 | 100.00% |

General Election Results
| Party | Candidate | Votes | % |
|---|---|---|---|
| Democratic | Olivia Cajero Bedford | 20,655 | 53.64% |
| Democratic | Phil Lopes | 17,851 | 46.36% |
| Total votes | | 38,506 | 100.00% |
| Democratic gain from Republican | | | |
| Democratic hold | | | |

=== District 28 ===
Primary Election Results
| Party | Candidate | Votes | % |
Democratic Party Primary Results
| Democratic | Ted Downing | 6,929 | 34.87% |
| Democratic | David Bradley | 5,340 | 26.87% |
| Democratic | Sam Ramirez | 3,084 | 15.52% |
| Democratic | Joe Pyritz | 3,025 | 15.22% |
| Democratic | Bruce A. Friedemann | 1,493 | 7.51% |
| Total votes | | 19,871 | 100.00% |
Republican Party Primary Results
| Republican | Edward Poelstra (incumbent) | 5,969 | 100.00% |
| Total votes | | 5,969 | 100.00% |

General Election Results
| Party | Candidate | Votes | % |
|---|---|---|---|
| Democratic | Ted Downing | 22,909 | 35.56% |
| Democratic | David Bradley | 22,322 | 34.65% |
| Republican | Edward Poelstra (incumbent) | 19,198 | 29.80% |
| Total votes | | 64,429 | 100.00% |
| Democratic gain from Republican | | | |
| Democratic gain from Republican | | | |

=== District 29 ===
Primary Election Results
| Party | Candidate | Votes | % |
Democratic Party Primary Results
| Democratic | Linda Lopez (incumbent) | 5,380 | 51.00% |
| Democratic | Victor Soltero (incumbent) | 5,168 | 49.00% |
| Total votes | | 10,548 | 100.00% |
Republican Party Primary Results
| Republican | Mike (Michael T.) Jenkins | 3,271 | 100.00% |
| Total votes | | 3,271 | 100.00% |

General Election Results
| Party | Candidate | Votes | % |
|---|---|---|---|
| Democratic | Linda Lopez (incumbent) | 13,902 | 38.79% |
| Democratic | Victor Soltero (incumbent) | 11,888 | 33.17% |
| Republican | Mike (Michael T.) Jenkins | 10,048 | 28.04% |
| Total votes | | 35,838 | 100.00% |
| Democratic gain from Republican | | | |
| Democratic gain from Republican | | | |

=== District 30 ===
Primary Election Results
| Party | Candidate | Votes | % |
Republican Party Primary Results
| Republican | Randy Graf (incumbent) | 12,613 | 55.98% |
| Republican | Marian McClure (incumbent) | 9,917 | 44.02% |
| Total votes | | 22,530 | 100.00% |
Democratic Party Primary Results
| Democratic | Bob Schwartz | 6,339 | 52.21% |
| Democratic | Mike Langmead | 5,803 | 47.79% |
| Total votes | | 12,142 | 100.00% |

General Election Results
| Party | Candidate | Votes | % |
|---|---|---|---|
| Republican | Randy Graf (incumbent) | 32,388 | 30.44% |
| Republican | Marian McClure (incumbent) | 31,325 | 29.44% |
| Democratic | Bob Schwartz | 22,175 | 20.84% |
| Democratic | Mike Langmead | 20,514 | 19.28% |
| Total votes | | 106,402 | 100.00% |
| Republican hold | | | |
| Republican hold | | | |

== See also ==
- 2002 United States elections
- 2002 United States House of Representatives elections in Arizona
- 2002 Arizona gubernatorial election
- 2002 Arizona Senate election
- 46th Arizona State Legislature
- Arizona House of Representatives
