= 2004 Arizona House of Representatives election =

- November 2, 2004

All 60 seats in the Arizona House 31 seats needed for a majority
	Majority party	Minority party	Third party
Leader	Jake Flake (retired)	John Loredo (retired)	Sylvia Laughter (defeated)
Party	Republican	Democratic	Independent
Leader's seat	5th - Snowflake	13th - Phoenix	2nd - Kayenta
Last election	39	21	0
Seats before	39	20 (Note: Representative Sylvia Laughter was elected in 2002 as a Democrat; however, she changed political party affiliation to Independent on February 14, 2003. She unsuccessfully ran for re-election in 2004 as an Independent.)	1
Seats after	38	22	0
Seat change	▼1	▲2	▼1
- Results: Democratic hold Democratic gain Republican hold
Speaker before election
Jake Flake
Republican
Elected Speaker
Jim Weiers
Republican

The 2004 Arizona House of Representatives election took place on Tuesday, November 2, 2004, with the primary election held on Tuesday, September 7, 2004. Arizona voters elected all 60 members of the Arizona House of Representatives in multi-member districts to serve two-year terms.

The election coincided with United States national elections and Arizona state elections, including for U.S. president, U.S. Senate, U.S. House, and Arizona Senate.

Following the previous election in 2002, Republicans held a 39-to-21-seat majority over Democrats. During the legislative session, Representative Sylvia Laughter switched political party affiliation from Democrat to Independent. Republicans maintained their majority in 2004, winning 38 seats. At 22 members, Democrats regained Laughter's seat and flipped a Republican seat, resulting in a net gain of two seats. The newly elected members served in the 47th Arizona State Legislature, during which Republican Jim Weiers was elected as Speaker of the Arizona House. (Note: Jim Weiers was elected as Speaker for the 47th legislature by acclamation.)

== Retiring Incumbents ==
=== Democrats ===
1. District 2: Jack C. Jackson Jr.
2. District 13: John Loredo
3. District 15: Ken Clark

=== Republicans ===
1. District 3: Joe Hart (Note: Ran for the Arizona State Senate, but lost to Ron Gould in the Republican primary.)
2. District 3: Bill Wagner (Note: Ran for the Arizona State Senate, but lost to Ron Gould in the Republican primary.)
3. District 5: Jake Flake (Note: Elected to the Arizona State Senate.)
4. District 10: Linda Gray (Note: Elected to the Arizona State Senate.)
5. District 11: Deb Gullett
6. District 18: Karen Johnson (Note: Elected to the Arizona State Senate.)
7. District 20: John Huppenthal (Note: Elected to the Arizona State Senate.)
8. District 24: Jim Carruthers
9. District 30: Randy Graf (Note: Ran for the U.S. House in the 8th congressional district, but lost to Jim Kolbe in the Republican primary.)

== Incumbents defeated in primary elections ==
=== Democrats ===
1. District 15: Wally Straughn
2. District 23: Ernest Bustamante

=== Republicans ===
1. District 4: Carole Hubbs
2. District 6: Clancy Jayne
3. District 9: Phil Hanson
4. District 12: Bill Arnold

== Incumbents defeated in general elections ==
=== Republican ===
1. District 17: Mark Thompson (Note: Defeated in the general election by Democratic incumbent Meg Burton Cahill and Republican Laura Knaperek.)

=== Independent ===
1. District 2: Sylvia Laughter

== Predictions ==
Source	Ranking	As of
Rothenberg	Likely R	October 1, 2004

== Summary of results ==
Italics denote an open seat held by the incumbent party; bold text denotes a gain for a party.

District	Incumbent	Party	Elected representative	Outcome
1st	Tom O'Halleran	Rep	Tom O'Halleran	Rep hold
1st	Lucy Mason	Rep	Lucy Mason	Rep hold
2nd	Sylvia Laughter	Ind	**Ann Kirkpatrick**	**Dem gain**
2nd	Jack C. Jackson Jr.	Dem	Albert Tom	Dem hold
3rd	Joe Hart	Rep	Nancy McLain	Rep hold
3rd	Bill Wagner	Rep	Trish Groe	Rep hold
4th	Tom Boone	Rep	Tom Boone	Rep hold
4th	Carole Hubbs	Rep	Judy M. Burges	Rep hold
5th	Bill Konopnicki	Rep	Bill Konopnicki	Rep hold
5th	Jake Flake	Rep	**Jack A. Brown**	**Dem gain**
6th	Ted Carpenter	Rep	Ted Carpenter	Rep hold
6th	Clancy Jayne	Rep	Pamela Gorman	Rep hold
7th	Ray Barnes	Rep	Ray Barnes	Rep hold
7th	John Allen (Note: Moved from district 7 to 11 and re-elected in district 11.)	Rep	David Burnell Smith (Note: Republican Representative David Burnell Smith was removed from office on January 26, 2006. Nancy K. Barto (R) was appointed by the Maricopa County Board of Supervisors on February 3, 2006 to fill the vacancy in District 7.)	Rep hold
8th	Michele Reagan	Rep	Michele Reagan	Rep hold
8th	Colette Rosati	Rep	Colette Rosati	Rep hold
9th	Bob Stump	Rep	Bob Stump	Rep hold
9th	Phil Hanson	Rep	Rick Murphy	Rep hold
10th	Doug Quelland	Rep	Doug Quelland	Rep hold
10th	Linda Gray	Rep	Jim Weiers	Rep hold
11th	Stephen Tully	Rep	Stephen Tully	Rep hold
11th	Deb Gullett	Rep	John Allen	Rep hold
12th	John Nelson	Rep	John Nelson	Rep hold
12th	Bill Arnold	Rep	Jerry Weiers	Rep hold
13th	Steve Gallardo	Dem	Steve Gallardo	Dem hold
13th	John Loredo	Dem	Martha Garcia	Dem hold
14th	Debbie McCune-Davis	Dem	Debbie McCune-Davis	Dem hold
14th	Robert Meza	Dem	Robert Meza	Dem hold
15th	Ken Clark	Dem	Kyrsten Sinema	Dem hold
15th	Wally Straughn	Dem	David Lujan	Dem hold
16th	Leah Landrum	Dem	Leah Landrum	Dem hold
16th	Ben R. Miranda	Dem	Ben R. Miranda	Dem hold
17th	Meg Burton Cahill	Dem	Meg Burton Cahill	Dem hold
17th	Mark Thompson	Rep	Laura Knaperek	Rep hold
18th	Russell Pearce	Rep	Russell Pearce	Rep hold
18th	Karen Johnson	Rep	Mark Anderson	Rep hold
19th	Gary Pierce	Rep	Gary Pierce	Rep hold
19th	Chuck Gray	Rep	Chuck Gray (Note: Republican Representative Chuck Gray resigned his House seat and was sworn in as state senator for District 19 on March 15, 2006. Kirk Adams (R) was appointed by the Maricopa County Board of Supervisors to fill Mr. Gray's unexpired term as Representative of District 19 on March 17, 2006.)	Rep hold
20th	Bob Robson	Rep	Bob Robson	Rep hold
20th	John Huppenthal	Rep	John McComish (Note: Initially, John McComish lost the Republican Primary for District 20, coming in third place by only 4 votes behind second place finisher Anton Orlich. However, following an official recount, McComish was decided to have received 13 more votes than Orlich, changing the outcome of the top-two primary race.)	Rep hold
21st	Steve Yarbrough	Rep	Steve Yarbrough	Rep hold
21st	Warde V. Nichols	Rep	Warde V. Nichols	Rep hold
22nd	Eddie Farnsworth	Rep	Eddie Farnsworth	Rep hold
22nd	Andy Biggs	Rep	Andy Biggs	Rep hold
23rd	Cheryl Chase	Dem	Cheryl Chase (Note: Representative Cheryl Chase was re-elected in 2004 as a Democrat; however, she changed political party affiliation to Republican on October 13, 2005.)	Dem hold
23rd	Ernest Bustamante	Dem	Pete Rios	Dem hold
24th	Amanda Aguirre (Note: Democratic Representative Robert C. Cannell was appointed to the Senate on January 24, 2003, by the Yuma County Board of Supervisors to fill the vacancy in District 24. He resigned his House seat and was sworn in as senator on January 27, 2003. Amanda Aguirre (D) was appointed by the Yuma County Board of Supervisors to fill the House vacancy in District 24 on February 6, 2003 and was sworn in as representative on February 10, 2003.)	Dem	Amanda Aguirre	Dem hold
24th	Jim Carruthers	Rep	Russ Jones	Rep hold
25th	Manuel V. "Manny" Alvarez	Dem	Manuel V. "Manny" Alvarez	Dem hold
25th	Jennifer J. Burns	Rep	Jennifer J. Burns	Rep hold
26th	Steve Huffman	Rep	Steve Huffman	Rep hold
26th	Pete Hershberger	Rep	Pete Hershberger	Rep hold
27th	Phil Lopes	Dem	Phil Lopes	Dem hold
27th	Olivia Cajero Bedford	Dem	Olivia Cajero Bedford	Dem hold
28th	Dave Bradley	Dem	Dave Bradley	Dem hold
28th	Ted Downing	Dem	Ted Downing	Dem hold
29th	Linda Lopez	Dem	Linda Lopez	Dem hold
29th	Tom Prezelski (Note: Democratic Representative Victor Soltero was appointed to the Senate on January 28, 2003, by the Pima County Board of Supervisors to fill the vacancy in District 29. He resigned his House seat and was sworn in as senator on January 29, 2003. Tom Prezelski (D) was appointed by the Pima County Board of Supervisors to fill the House vacancy in District 29 on February 11, 2003 and was sworn in as representative on February 12, 2003.)	Dem	Tom Prezelski	Dem hold
30th	Marian McClure	Rep	Marian McClure	Rep hold
30th	Randy Graf	Rep	Jonathan Paton	Rep hold

== Detailed results ==
Sources for election results:

=== District 1 ===
Primary election results
Party	Candidate	Votes	%
Republican Party primary results
Republican	Lucy Mason (incumbent)	14,586	51.84%
Republican	Tom O'Halleran (incumbent)	13,553	48.16%
Total votes		28,139	100.00%
Democratic Party primary results
Democratic	Wesley L. Edmonds	5,429	50.35%
Democratic	James Kimes	5,353	49.65%
Total votes		10,782	100.00%
Libertarian Party primary results
Libertarian	Allan Briney	167	100.00%
Total votes		167	100.00%

General election results
Party	Candidate	Votes	%
Republican	Lucy Mason (incumbent)	48,585	32.58%
Republican	Tom O'Halleran (incumbent)	47,777	32.04%
Democratic	James Kimes	24,346	16.33%
Democratic	Wesley L. Edmonds	23,704	15.90%
Libertarian	Allan Briney	4,693	3.15%
Total votes		149,105	100.00%
Republican hold			
Republican hold			

=== District 2 ===
Primary election results
Party	Candidate	Votes	%
Democratic Party primary results
Democratic	Albert Tom	8,552	39.34%
Democratic	Ann Kirkpatrick	7,165	32.96%
Democratic	Beverly Becenti-Pigman	6,023	27.70%
Total votes		21,740	100.00%

General election results
Party	Candidate	Votes	%
Democratic	Ann Kirkpatrick	28,947	38.72%
Democratic	Albert Tom	24,664	32.99%
Independent	Sylvia Laughter (incumbent)	21,150	28.29%
Total votes		74,761	100.00%
Democratic gain from Independent			
Democratic hold			

=== District 3 ===
Primary election results
Party	Candidate	Votes	%
Republican Party primary results
Republican	Nancy McLain	8,599	37.95%
Republican	Trish Groe	7,053	31.13%
Republican	Ray Cullison II	7,004	30.91%
Total votes		22,656	100.00%
Democratic Party primary results
Democratic	Peggy Toomey Hammann	3,941	51.92%
Democratic	Bruce Hinman	3,649	48.08%
Total votes		7,590	100.00%

General election results
Party	Candidate	Votes	%
Republican	Nancy McLain	29,993	31.94%
Republican	Trish Groe	28,396	30.24%
Democratic	Bruce Hinman	18,138	19.31%
Democratic	Peggy Toomey Hammann	17,387	18.51%
Total votes		93,914	100.00%
Republican hold			
Republican hold			

=== District 4 ===
Primary election results
Party	Candidate	Votes	%
Republican Party primary results
Republican	Tom Boone (incumbent)	15,667	39.04%
Republican	Judy M. Burges	14,256	35.52%
Republican	Carole Hubbs (incumbent)	10,212	25.44%
Total votes		40,135	100.00%

General election results
Party	Candidate	Votes	%
Republican	Judy M. Burges	59,589	50.04%
Republican	Tom Boone (incumbent)	59,496	49.96%
Total votes		119,085	100.00%
Republican hold			
Republican hold			

=== District 5 ===
Primary election results
Party	Candidate	Votes	%
Republican Party primary results
Republican	Bill Konopnicki (incumbent)	8,645	54.59%
Republican	Sylvia Tenney Allen	7,190	45.41%
Total votes		15,835	100.00%
Democratic Party primary results
Democratic	Jack A. Brown	12,402	100.00%
Total votes		12,402	100.00%

General election results
Party	Candidate	Votes	%
Republican	Bill Konopnicki (incumbent)	33,326	38.12%
Democratic	Jack A. Brown	27,228	31.14%
Republican	Sylvia Tenney Allen	26,880	30.74%
Total votes		87,434	100.00%
Republican hold			
Democratic gain from Republican			

=== District 6 ===
Primary election results
Party	Candidate	Votes	%
Republican Party primary results
Republican	Pamela Gorman	7,119	34.36%
Republican	Ted Carpenter (incumbent)	5,476	26.43%
Republican	Clancy Jayne (incumbent)	5,269	25.43%
Republican	Rick Robinson	2,857	13.79%
Total votes		20,721	100.00%
Democratic Party primary results
Democratic	Rano Singh	3,417	100.00%
Total votes		3,417	100.00%
Libertarian Party primary results
Libertarian	Richard Sutton (Note: The candidate ran a write-in campaign in this election.) (Note: Despite coming in first place in the Libertarian primary as a write-in candidate, Richard Sutton did not advance to the general election.)	4	100.00%
Total votes		4	100.00%

General election results
Party	Candidate	Votes	%
Republican	Pamela Gorman	35,457	37.97%
Republican	Ted Carpenter (incumbent)	33,758	36.15%
Democratic	Rano Singh	24,178	25.89%
Total votes		93,393	100.00%
Republican hold			
Republican hold			

=== District 7 ===
Primary election results
Party	Candidate	Votes	%
Republican Party primary results
Republican	Ray Barnes (incumbent)	7,440	34.64%
Republican	David Burnell Smith	6,198	28.85%
Republican	Thom Von Hapsburg	4,672	21.75%
Republican	Wes Marsh	3,171	14.76%
Total votes		21,481	100.00%
Democratic Party primary results
Democratic	Mark Monday	2,948	50.76%
Democratic	Virgel Cain	2,860	49.24%
Total votes		5,808	100.00%

General election results
Party	Candidate	Votes	%
Republican	Ray Barnes (incumbent)	40,381	33.12%
Republican	David Burnell Smith	37,752	30.97%
Democratic	Virgel Cain	22,694	18.61%
Democratic	Mark Monday	21,087	17.30%
Total votes		121,914	100.00%
Republican hold			
Republican hold			

=== District 8 ===
Primary election results
Party	Candidate	Votes	%
Republican Party primary results
Republican	Michele Reagan (incumbent)	13,890	45.88%
Republican	Colette Rosati (incumbent)	9,199	30.38%
Republican	Royce Flora	7,186	23.74%
Total votes		30,275	100.00%
Democratic Party primary results
Democratic	Nancy Stein	3,453	50.02%
Democratic	Nancy Buel	3,450	49.98%
Total votes		6,903	100.00%

General election results
Party	Candidate	Votes	%
Republican	Michele Reagan (incumbent)	50,806	34.44%
Republican	Colette Rosati (incumbent)	41,496	28.13%
Democratic	Nancy Stein	28,480	19.31%
Democratic	Nancy Buel	26,737	18.12%
Total votes		147,519	100.00%
Republican hold			
Republican hold			

=== District 9 ===
Primary election results
Party	Candidate	Votes	%
Republican Party primary results
Republican	Bob Stump (incumbent)	13,845	47.25%
Republican	Rick Murphy	8,144	27.79%
Republican	Phil Hanson (incumbent)	7,312	24.95%
Total votes		29,301	100.00%

General election results
Party	Candidate	Votes	%
Republican	Bob Stump (incumbent)	43,216	50.06%
Republican	Rick Murphy	43,111	49.94%
Total votes		86,327	100.00%
Republican hold			
Republican hold			

=== District 10 ===
Primary election results
Party	Candidate	Votes	%
Republican Party primary results
Republican	Jim Weiers	6,985	53.83%
Republican	Doug Quelland (incumbent)	5,990	46.17%
Total votes		12,975	100.00%
Democratic Party primary results
Democratic	Jackie Thrasher	3,680	57.33%
Democratic	Aaron Jahneke	2,739	42.67%
Total votes		6,419	100.00%

General election results
Party	Candidate	Votes	%
Republican	Jim Weiers	24,185	28.30%
Republican	Doug Quelland (incumbent)	22,959	26.86%
Democratic	Jackie Thrasher	21,284	24.90%
Democratic	Aaron Jahneke	17,042	19.94%
Total votes		85,470	100.00%
Republican hold			
Republican hold			

=== District 11 ===
Primary election results
Party	Candidate	Votes	%
Republican Party primary results
Republican	Stephen Tully (incumbent)	10,940	42.64%
Republican	John Allen (incumbent)	8,454	32.95%
Republican	Alberto Gutier	6,265	24.42%
Total votes		25,659	100.00%
Libertarian Party primary results
Libertarian	Garry Myers	100	54.05%
Libertarian	James Iannuzo	85	45.95%
Total votes		185	100.00%

General election results
Party	Candidate	Votes	%
Republican	Stephen Tully (incumbent)	45,503	38.97%
Republican	John Allen (incumbent)	44,054	37.73%
Libertarian	Garry Myers	14,507	12.42%
Libertarian	James Iannuzo	12,693	10.87%
Total votes		116,757	100.00%
Republican hold			
Republican hold			

=== District 12 ===
Primary election results
Party	Candidate	Votes	%
Republican Party primary results
Republican	John Nelson (incumbent)	6,701	36.55%
Republican	Jerry Weiers	6,559	35.77%
Republican	William Arnold (incumbent)	5,076	27.68%
Total votes		18,336	100.00%
Democratic Party primary results
Democratic	Ken Thomas	3,875	51.80%
Democratic	Leonard A. Clark	3,605	48.20%
Total votes		7,480	100.00%

General election results
Party	Candidate	Votes	%
Republican	John Nelson (incumbent)	35,108	29.83%
Republican	Jerry Weiers	34,544	29.35%
Democratic	Ken Thomas	25,575	21.73%
Democratic	Leonard A. Clark	22,452	19.08%
Total votes		117,679	100.00%
Republican hold			
Republican hold			

=== District 13 ===
Primary election results
Party	Candidate	Votes	%
Democratic Party primary results
Democratic	Steve Gallardo (incumbent)	2,261	36.04%
Democratic	Martha Garcia	1,875	29.89%
Democratic	Isaac Serna	850	13.55%
Democratic	MacLovia Zepeda	749	11.94%
Democratic	Paul Valach	539	8.59%
Total votes		6,274	100.00%
Republican Party primary results
Republican	Bill Johnson	2,332	100.00%
Total votes		2,332	100.00%

General election results
Party	Candidate	Votes	%
Democratic	Martha Garcia	14,202	39.17%
Democratic	Steve Gallardo (incumbent)	12,430	34.28%
Republican	Bill Johnson	9,627	26.55%
Total votes		36,259	100.00%
Democratic hold			
Democratic hold			

=== District 14 ===
Primary election results
Party	Candidate	Votes	%
Democratic Party primary results
Democratic	Debbie McCune-Davis (incumbent)	2,130	50.53%
Democratic	Robert Meza (incumbent)	2,085	49.47%
Total votes		4,215	100.00%

General election results
Party	Candidate	Votes	%
Democratic	Debbie McCune-Davis (incumbent)	12,261	51.22%
Democratic	Robert Meza (incumbent)	11,678	48.78%
Total votes		23,939	100.000%
Democratic hold			
Democratic hold			

=== District 15 ===
Primary election results
Party	Candidate	Votes	%
Democratic Party primary results
Democratic	Kyrsten Sinema	3,475	36.95%
Democratic	David Lujan	3,204	34.07%
Democratic	Wally Straughn (incumbent)	2,726	28.98%
Total votes		9,405	100.00%
Republican Party primary results
Republican	Tara Roesler	3,383	52.94%
Republican	Oksana Komarnyckyj	3,007	47.06%
Total votes		6,390	100.00%

General election results
Party	Candidate	Votes	%
Democratic	David Lujan	19,999	31.12%
Democratic	Kyrsten Sinema	19,402	30.19%
Republican	Tara Roesler	12,565	19.55%
Republican	Oksana Komarnyckyj	12,299	19.14%
Total votes		64,265	100.00%
Democratic hold			
Democratic hold			

=== District 16 ===
Primary election results
Party	Candidate	Votes	%
Democratic Party primary results
Democratic	Leah Landrum (incumbent)	2,812	32.43%
Democratic	Ben R. Miranda (incumbent)	2,465	28.43%
Democratic	Betty Ware	1,413	16.30%
Democratic	John L. Ramos	1,123	12.95%
Democratic	Julian Sodari	858	9.90%
Total votes		8,671	100.00%

General election results
Party	Candidate	Votes	%
Democratic	Leah Landrum (incumbent)	19,077	50.61%
Democratic	Ben R. Miranda (incumbent)	18,619	49.39%
Total votes		37,696	100.00%
Democratic hold			
Democratic hold			

=== District 17 ===
Primary election results
Party	Candidate	Votes	%
Democratic Party primary results
Democratic	Meg Burton Cahill (incumbent)	4,789	58.14%
Democratic	Edward Z. Ableser	3,448	41.86%
Total votes		8,237	100.00%
Republican Party primary results
Republican	Laura Knaperek	7,114	52.92%
Republican	Mark Thompson (incumbent)	6,328	47.08%
Total votes		13,442	100.00%
Libertarian Party primary results
Libertarian	Mike Read	17	100.00%
Total votes		17	100.00%

General election results
Party	Candidate	Votes	%
Democratic	Meg Burton Cahill (incumbent)	27,915	26.84%
Republican	Laura Knaperek	25,618	24.63%
Democratic	Edward Z. Ableser	24,194	23.26%
Republican	Mark Thompson (incumbent)	23,074	22.19%
Libertarian	Mike Read	3,194	3.07%
Total votes		103,995	100.00%
Democratic hold			
Republican hold			

=== District 18 ===
Primary election results
Party	Candidate	Votes	%
Republican Party primary results
Republican	Russell Pearce (incumbent)	7,302	35.31%
Republican	Mark Anderson	6,941	33.56%
Republican	Cecilia E. Fleming	2,401	11.61%
Republican	Colby Bower	1,905	9.21%
Republican	Joe Brown	1,470	7.11%
Republican	JT Ready	662	3.20%
Total votes		20,681	100.00%
Democratic Party primary results
Democratic	Kevin Jackson	2,333	100.00%
Total votes		2,333	100.00%

General election results
Party	Candidate	Votes	%
Republican	Mark Anderson	24,271	38.30%
Republican	Russell Pearce (incumbent)	23,286	36.75%
Democratic	Kevin Jackson	15,811	24.95%
Total votes		63,368	100.00%
Republican hold			
Republican hold			

=== District 19 ===
Primary election results
Party	Candidate	Votes	%
Republican Party primary results
Republican	Gary Pierce (incumbent)	11,186	50.72%
Republican	Chuck Gray (incumbent)	10,870	49.28%
Total votes		22,056	100.00%

General election results
Party	Candidate	Votes	%
Republican	Chuck Gray (incumbent)	45,407	51.57%
Republican	Gary Pierce (incumbent)	42,644	48.43%
Total votes		88,051	100.00%
Republican hold			
Republican hold			

=== District 20 ===
Primary election results
Party	Candidate	Votes	%
Republican Party primary results
Republican	Bob Robson (incumbent)	6,801	24.96%
Republican	Anton Orlich	5,533	20.31%
Republican	John McComish	5,529	20.29%
Republican	Jeff JD Dial	5,229	19.19%
Republican	Linda Wegener	4,156	15.25%
Total votes		27,248	100.00%
Republican Party Primary RECOUNT Results
Republican	Bob Robson (incumbent)	6,925	24.98%
Republican	John McComish	5,633	20.32%
Republican	Anton Orlich	5,620	20.27%
Republican	Jeff JD Dial	5,310	19.16%
Republican	Linda Wegener	4,232	15.27%
Total votes		27,720	100.00%
Democratic Party primary results
Democratic	Jim Torgeson	3,715	100.00%
Total votes		3,715	100.00%
Libertarian Party primary results
Libertarian	Joel Beckwith	89	100.00%
Total votes		89	100.00%

General election results
Party	Candidate	Votes	%
Republican	John McComish	38,059	33.74%
Republican	Bob Robson (incumbent)	37,334	33.10%
Democratic	Jim Torgeson	29,836	26.45%
Libertarian	Joel Beckwith	7,570	6.71%
Total votes		112,799	100.00%
Republican hold			
Republican hold			

=== District 21 ===
Primary election results
Party	Candidate	Votes	%
Republican Party primary results
Republican	Steve Yarbrough (incumbent)	10,579	44.17%
Republican	Warde V. Nichols (incumbent)	7,489	31.27%
Republican	Gretchen Wolfe	5,882	24.56%
Total votes		23,950	100.00%

General election results
Party	Candidate	Votes	%
Republican	Steve Yarbrough (incumbent)	50,125	52.76%
Republican	Warde V. Nichols (incumbent)	44,883	47.24%
Total votes		95,008	100.00%
Republican hold			
Republican hold			

=== District 22 ===
Primary election results
Party	Candidate	Votes	%
Republican Party primary results
Republican	Eddie Farnsworth (incumbent)	12,157	52.04%
Republican	Andy Biggs (incumbent)	11,202	47.96%
Total votes		23,359	100.00%
Libertarian Party primary results
Libertarian	Wade Reynolds	72	100.00%
Total votes		72	100.00%

General election results
Party	Candidate	Votes	%
Republican	Eddie Farnsworth (incumbent)	55,674	44.93%
Republican	Andy Biggs (incumbent)	51,932	41.91%
Libertarian	Wade Reynolds	16,304	13.16%
Total votes		123,910	100.00%
Republican hold			
Republican hold			

=== District 23 ===
Primary election results
Party	Candidate	Votes	%
Democratic Party primary results
Democratic	Pete Rios	5,120	35.18%
Democratic	Cheryl Chase (incumbent)	4,867	33.44%
Democratic	Ernest Bustamante (incumbent)	4,566	31.37%
Total votes		14,553	100.00%
Republican Party primary results
Republican	Frank Pratt	3,794	100.00%
Total votes		3,794	100.00%
Libertarian Party primary results
Libertarian	Steve Flynn	82	100.00%
Total votes		82	100.00%

General election results
Party	Candidate	Votes	%
Democratic	Cheryl Chase (incumbent)	24,007	32.95%
Democratic	Pete Rios	22,841	31.35%
Republican	Frank Pratt	21,750	29.85%
Libertarian	Steve Flynn	4,262	5.85%
Total votes		72,860	100.00%
Democratic hold			
Democratic hold			

=== District 24 ===
Primary election results
Party	Candidate	Votes	%
Democratic Party primary results
Democratic	Amanda Aguirre (incumbent)	4,534	36.39%
Democratic	William Michael Smith	3,446	27.66%
Democratic	Fernando "Fernie" Quiroz	2,356	18.91%
Democratic	Sherry Smith	2,122	17.03%
Total votes		12,458	100.00%
Republican Party primary results
Republican	Russ Jones	5,953	100.00%
Total votes		5,953	100.00%
Libertarian Party primary results
Libertarian	Edmund L. Sheldon III	8	100.00%
Total votes		8	100.00%

General election results
Party	Candidate	Votes	%
Republican	Russ Jones	20,153	34.48%
Democratic	Amanda Aguirre (incumbent)	18,306	31.32%
Democratic	William Michael Smith	16,973	29.04%
Libertarian	Edmund L. Sheldon III	3,018	5.16%
Total votes		58,450	100.00%
Republican hold			
Democratic hold			

=== District 25 ===
Primary election results
Party	Candidate	Votes	%
Democratic Party primary results
Democratic	Manuel V. "Manny" Alvarez (incumbent)	7,462	41.51%
Democratic	Monica Perez	4,656	25.90%
Democratic	Louis L. Johnson	2,967	16.50%
Democratic	Lori Tapia (Note: The candidate withdrew from the election but was still listed on the ballot.)	2,893	16.09%
Total votes		17,978	100.00%
Republican Party primary results
Republican	Jennifer J. Burns (incumbent)	5,484	37.51%
Republican	David Stevens	4,864	33.27%
Republican	Mary Ann Black	4,272	29.22%
Total votes		14,620	100.00%

General election results
Party	Candidate	Votes	%
Democratic	Manuel V. "Manny" Alvarez (incumbent)	25,599	27.03%
Republican	Jennifer J. Burns (incumbent)	25,121	26.52%
Democratic	Monica Perez	22,561	23.82%
Republican	David Stevens	21,437	22.63%
Total votes		94,718	100.00%
Democratic hold			
Republican hold			

=== District 26 ===
Primary election results
Party	Candidate	Votes	%
Republican Party primary results
Republican	Pete Hershberger (incumbent)	13,681	52.76%
Republican	Steve Huffman (incumbent)	12,248	47.24%
Total votes		25,929	100.00%
Democratic Party primary results
Democratic	Amanda Simpson	6,603	57.32%
Democratic	Martin Drozdoff	4,916	42.68%
Total votes		11,519	100.00%

General election results
Party	Candidate	Votes	%
Republican	Pete Hershberger (incumbent)	49,072	32.35%
Republican	Steve Huffman (incumbent)	43,156	28.45%
Democratic	Amanda Simpson	31,111	20.51%
Democratic	Martin Drozdoff	28,331	18.68%
Total votes		151,670	100.00%
Republican hold			
Republican hold			

=== District 27 ===
Primary election results
Party	Candidate	Votes	%
Democratic Party primary results
Democratic	Olivia Cajero Bedford (incumbent)	5,968	55.51%
Democratic	Phil Lopes (incumbent)	4,784	44.49%
Total votes		10,752	100.00%

General election results
Party	Candidate	Votes	%
Democratic	Olivia Cajero Bedford (incumbent)	35,507	54.28%
Democratic	Phil Lopes (incumbent)	29,902	45.72%
Total votes		65,409	100.00%
Democratic hold			
Democratic hold			

=== District 28 ===
Primary election results
Party	Candidate	Votes	%
Democratic Party primary results
Democratic	Ted Downing (incumbent)	7,808	45.98%
Democratic	Dave Bradley (incumbent)	6,250	36.81%
Democratic	Dan Lawrence	2,923	17.21%
Total votes		16,981	100.00%
Republican Party primary results
Republican	Bill Phillips	6,935	53.79%
Republican	Richard "Dick" Dale	5,958	46.21%
Total votes		12,893	100.00%
Libertarian Party primary results
Libertarian	Daniel Hickman	126	100.00%
Total votes		126	100.00%

General election results
Party	Candidate	Votes	%
Democratic	Ted Downing (incumbent)	38,336	31.64%
Democratic	Dave Bradley (incumbent)	37,003	30.54%
Republican	Bill Phillips	21,345	17.62%
Republican	Richard "Dick" Dale	20,545	16.96%
Libertarian	Daniel Hickman	3,929	3.24%
Total votes		121,158	100.00%
Democratic hold			
Democratic hold			

=== District 29 ===
Primary election results
Party	Candidate	Votes	%
Democratic Party primary results
Democratic	Linda Lopez (incumbent)	5,085	59.92%
Democratic	Tom Prezelski (incumbent)	3,401	40.08%
Total votes		8,486	100.00%

General election results
Party	Candidate	Votes	%
Democratic	Linda Lopez (incumbent)	30,317	60.07%
Democratic	Tom Prezelski (incumbent)	20,152	39.93%
Total votes		50,469	100.00%
Democratic hold			
Democratic hold			

=== District 30 ===
Primary election results
Party	Candidate	Votes	%
Republican Party primary results
Republican	Jonathan Paton	10,811	31.39%
Republican	Marian McClure (incumbent)	10,208	29.64%
Republican	David Gowan	8,326	24.18%
Republican	Douglas Sposito	5,091	14.78%
Total votes		34,436	100.00%
Democratic Party primary results
Democratic	Esther Sharif	7,930	100.00%
Total votes		7,930	100.00%

General election results
Party	Candidate	Votes	%
Republican	Marian McClure (incumbent)	48,777	37.00%
Republican	Jonathan Paton	46,483	35.26%
Democratic	Esther Sharif	36,570	27.74%
Total votes		131,830	100.00%
Republican hold			
Republican hold			

== See also ==
- 2004 United States elections
- 2004 United States presidential election in Arizona
- 2004 United States Senate election in Arizona
- 2004 United States House of Representatives elections in Arizona
- 2004 Arizona Senate election
- 47th Arizona State Legislature
- Arizona House of Representatives
