= 46th Arizona State Legislature =

Session of the Arizona Legislature

| ← | 45th | 47th | → |
- Arizona State Capitol (2014)

Overview
- Legislative body: Arizona State Legislature
- Jurisdiction: Arizona, United States
- Term: January 1, 2003 – December 31, 2004

Senate
- Members: 30
- President: Ken Bennett
- Temporary President: Carolyn S. Allen
- Party control: Republican (17–13)

House of Representatives
- Members: 60
- Speaker: Jake Flake
- Party control: Republican (39–20-1)

Sessions
- 1st: January 13 – June 19, 2003
- 2nd: January 12 – May 26, 2004

Special sessions
- 1st: March 17 – March 17, 2003
- 2nd: October 20 – December 13, 2003

The 46th Arizona State Legislature, consisting of the Arizona State Senate and the Arizona House of Representatives, was constituted in Phoenix from January 1, 2003, to December 31, 2004, during the first two years of Janet Napolitano's first term in office. Both the Senate and the House membership remained constant at 30 and 60, respectively. The Republicans gained two seats in the Senate, giving them a 17–13 majority. The Republicans gained four seats in the House, maintaining their majority in the lower chamber, 39–20-1, with a single representative switching their party affiliation from Democrat to Independent after the election.

== Sessions ==
The Legislature met for two regular sessions at the State Capitol in Phoenix. The first opened on January 13, 2003, and adjourned on June 19, while the Second Regular Session convened on January 12, 2004, and adjourned sine die on May 26.

There were two Special Sessions, the first of which was convened on March 17, 2003, and adjourned later on the same day; and the second convened on October 20, 2003, and adjourned sine die on December 13.

== State Senate ==
=== Members ===
The asterisk (*) denotes members of the previous Legislature who continued in office as members of this Legislature.

| District | Senator | Party | Notes |
|---|---|---|---|
| 1 | Ken Bennett* | Republican | |
| 2 | Jack C. Jackson* | Democrat | Represented District 3 in prior legislature |
| 3 | Linda Binder | Republican | |
| 4 | Jack W. Harper | Republican | |
| 5 | Jack A. Brown* | Democrat | Represented District 4 in prior legislature |
| 6 | Dean Martin* | Republican | Represented District 24 in prior legislature |
| 7 | Jim Waring | Republican | |
| 8 | Carolyn S. Allen | Republican | |
| 9 | Robert Burns | Republican | |
| 10 | Jim Weiers | Republican | |
| 11 | Barbara Leff | Republican | |
| 12 | Robert Blendu | Republican | |
| 13 | Richard Miranda | Democrat | |
| 14 | Bill Brotherton | Democrat | |
| 15 | Ken Cheuvront | Democrat | |
| 16 | Linda Aguirre* | Democrat | Represented District 23 in prior legislature |
| 17 | Harry E. Mitchell* | Democrat | Represented District 27 in prior legislature |
| 18 | Mark Anderson | Republican | |
| 19 | Marilyn Jarrett* | Republican | Represented District 21 in prior legislature |
| 20 | Slade Mead | Republican | |
| 21 | Jay Tibshraeny | Republican | |
| 22 | Thayer Verschoor | Republican | |
| 23 | Pete Rios* | Democrat | Represented District 7 in prior legislature |
| 24 | Robert Cannell | Democrat | Herb Guenther was elected to the position, but Cannell was appointed when Guenther did not take the oath of office |
| 25 | Marsha Arzberger* | Democrat | Represented District 8 in prior legislature |
| 26 | Toni Hellon* | Republican | Represented District 12 in prior legislature |
| 27 | Jorge Luis Garcia | Democrat | |
| 28 | Gabrielle Giffords | Democrat | |
| 29 | Victor Soltero | Democrat | Elected to the House, but was appointed January 24, 2003, to replace Ramón Valadez, who did not take the Oath of Office |
| 30 | Timothy S. Bee | Republican | Represented District 9 in prior legislature |

== House of Representatives ==
=== Members ===
The asterisk (*) denotes members of the previous Legislature who continued in office as members of this Legislature.

| District | Representative | Party | Notes |
|---|---|---|---|
| 1 | Lucy Mason | Republican | |
| 1 | Tom O'Halleran | Republican | Represented District 2 in prior legislature |
| 2 | Jack C. Jackson Jr. | Democrat | |
| 2 | Sylvia Laughter* | Independent | Was elected as a Democrat, changed party affiliation on February 4, 2003; represented District 3 in prior legislature |
| 3 | Joe Hart | Republican | |
| 3 | Bill Wagner III | Republican | |
| 4 | Tom Boone | Republican | |
| 4 | Carole Hubs | Republican | |
| 5 | Jake Flake* | Republican | Represented District 4 in prior legislature |
| 5 | Bill Konopnicki | Republican | |
| 6 | Ted Carpenter* | Republican | Represented District 19 in prior legislature |
| 6 | Clancy Jayne | Republican | |
| 7 | John Allen | Republican | |
| 7 | Ray Barnes | Republican | |
| 8 | Michelle Reagan | Republican | |
| 8 | Colette Rosati | Republican | |
| 9 | Phil Hanson* | Republican | Represented District 17 in prior legislature |
| 9 | Bob Stump | Republican | |
| 10 | Linda Gray* | Republican | Represented District 16 in prior legislature |
| 10 | Doug Quelland | Republican | |
| 11 | Deb Gullett* | Republican | Represented District 18 in prior legislature |
| 11 | Stephen Tully* | Republican | Represented District 24 in prior legislature |
| 12 | Bill Arnold | Republican | |
| 12 | John B. Nelson* | Republican | Represented District 17 in prior legislature |
| 13 | Steve Gallardo | Democrat | |
| 13 | John Loredo* | Democrat | Represented District 22 in prior legislature |
| 14 | Debbie McCune Davis | Democrat | |
| 14 | Robert Meza | Democrat | |
| 15 | Ken Clark | Democrat | |
| 15 | Wally Straughn | Democrat | |
| 16 | Leah Landrum Taylor* | Democrat | Represented District 23 in prior legislature |
| 16 | Ben R. Miranda | Democrat | |
| 17 | Meg Burton Cahill* | Democrat | Represented District 27 in prior legislature |
| 17 | Mark Thompson | Republican | |
| 18 | Karen S. Johnson* | Republican | Represented District 30 in prior legislature |
| 18 | Russell Pearce* | Republican | Represented District 29 in prior legislature |
| 19 | Chuck Gray | Republican | |
| 19 | Gary L. Pierce* | Republican | Represented District 21 in prior legislature |
| 20 | John Huppenthal* | Republican | Represented District 6 in prior legislature |
| 20 | Bob Robson* | Republican | Represented District 6 in prior legislature |
| 21 | Warde Nichols | Republican | |
| 21 | Steven B. Yarbrough | Republican | |
| 22 | Andy Biggs | Republican | |
| 22 | Eddie Farnsworth* | Republican | Represented District 30 in prior legislature |
| 23 | Ernest Bustmante | Democrat | |
| 23 | Cheryl Chase* | Democrat | Represented District 7 in prior legislature |
| 24 | Amanda Aguirre | Democrat | Appointed February 2003 to fill vacancy created when Robert Cannell resigned upon his appointment to the State Senate |
| 24 | Jim Carruthers* | Republican | Represented District 5 in prior legislature |
| 25 | Manuel Alvarez | Democrat | |
| 25 | Jennifer Burns | Republican | |
| 26 | J. Peter Hershberger* | Republican | Represented District 12 in prior legislature |
| 26 | Steve Huffman* | Republican | Represented District 12 in prior legislature |
| 27 | Olivia Cajero Bedford | Democrat | |
| 27 | Phil Lopes | Democrat | |
| 28 | David T. Bradley | Democrat | |
| 28 | Ted Downing | Democrat | |
| 29 | Linda J. Lopez* | Democrat | Represented District 10 in prior legislature |
| 29 | Tom Prezelski | Democrat | Appointed February 11, 2003 to replace Victor Soltero |
| 29 | Victor Soltero* | Democrat | Represented District 10 in prior legislature; resigned January 29, 2003 |
| 30 | Randy Graf* | Republican | Represented District 9 in prior legislature |
| 30 | Marian McClure* | Republican | Represented District 9 in prior legislature |
