= Gail Griffin =

American politician

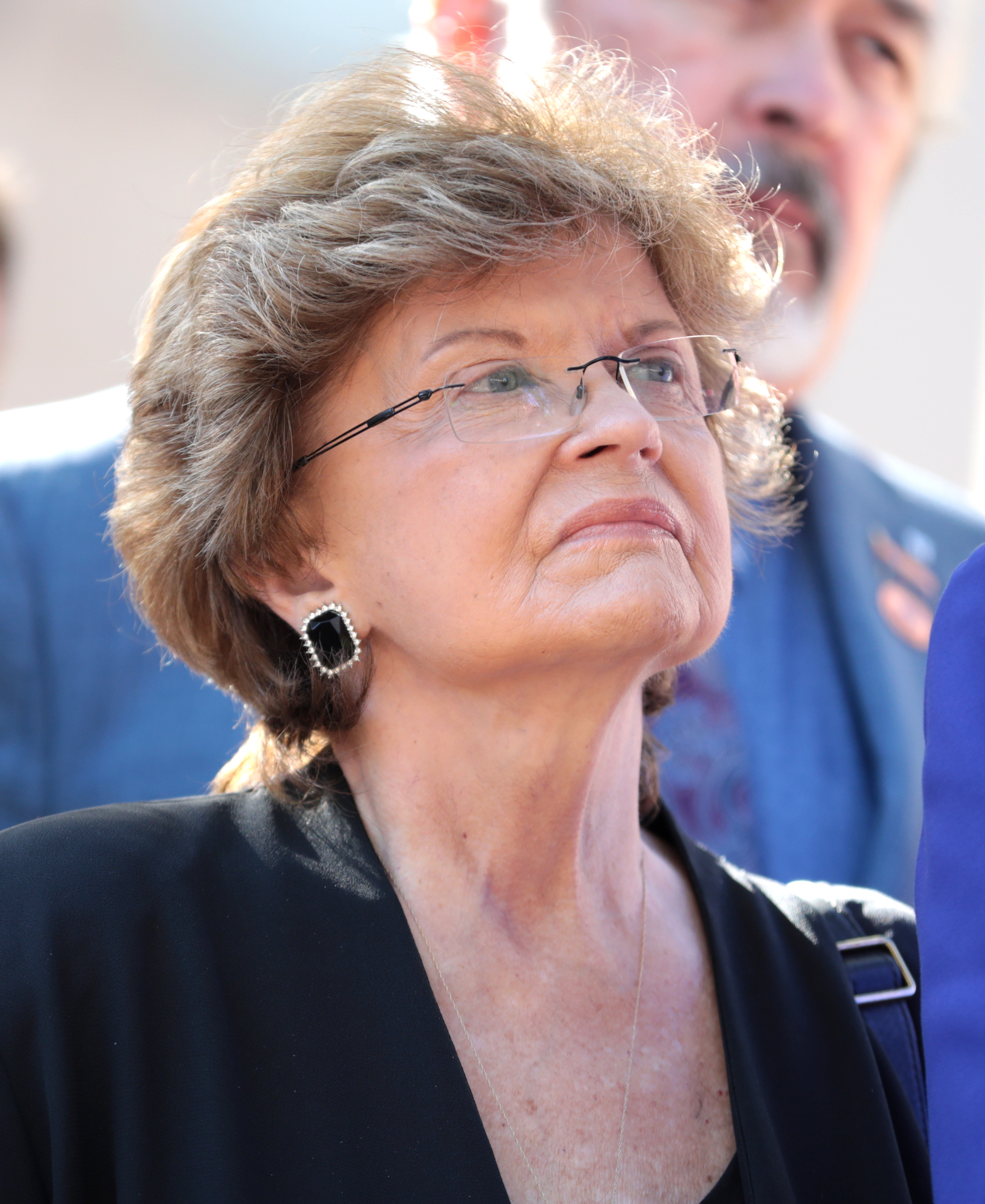
- Griffin in 2023

Member of the Arizona House of Representatives from the 19th district
- Incumbent
- Assumed office January 9, 2023 Serving with Lupe Diaz
- Preceded by: Lorenzo Sierra

Member of the Arizona House of Representatives from the 14th district
- In office January 14, 2019 – January 9, 2023
- Preceded by: Drew John
- Succeeded by: Laurin Hendrix

Member of the Arizona Senate from the 14th district
- In office January 14, 2013 – January 14, 2019
- Preceded by: Robert Meza
- Succeeded by: David Gowan

Member of the Arizona Senate from the 25th district
- In office January 10, 2011 – January 14, 2013
- Preceded by: Manny Alvarez
- Succeeded by: Bob Worsley

Member of the Arizona House of Representatives from the 8th district
- In office January 1997 – January 2001 Serving with Paul Newman (1997–1999); Mark Maiorana (1999–2001)
- Preceded by: Ruben Ortega
- Succeeded by: Bobby Lugo

Personal details
- Party: Republican
- Website: gailgriffin4senate.com

Gail Griffin is an American politician and a Republican member of the Arizona House of Representatives. She previously served in the Arizona Senate representing District 14 from 2013 to 2019. Griffin served consecutively in the Arizona Senate in the District 20 seat from January 10, 2011, until January 14, 2013, but served non-consecutively in the Arizona State Legislature from January 1997 until January 2001 in the Arizona House of Representatives District 8 seat. In 2019 Griffin proposed a bill to fund a US-Mexican border wall by levying a tax on Arizonans who look at pornography.

== Elections ==
- 2012 – Redistricted to District 14, and with incumbent Republican Senator Robert Meza redistricted to District 30, Griffin was unopposed for the August 28, 2012 Republican Primary, winning with 19,144 votes, and won the November 6, 2012 General election with 49,647 votes (61.7%) against Democratic nominee Representative Pat Fleming.
- 1996 – When Democratic Representative Ruben Ortega left the Legislature and left a District 8 seat open, Griffin ran in the September 10, 1996 Republican Primary and placed first with 3,340 votes; in the November 5, 1996 General election, Democratic Representative Paul Newman took the first seat and Griffin took the second seat ahead of Democratic nominee Aida Wick and fellow Republican nominee Michael Lunt.
- 1998 – When Democratic Representative Paul Newman ran for Arizona Corporation Commission and left a District 8 seat open, Griffin ran in the September 8, 1998 Republican Primary and placed first with 2,924 votes; in the November 3, 1998 General election, Griffin took the first seat with 12,718 and Democratic nominee Mark Maiorana took the second seat ahead of Democratic nominee Bobby Lugo and fellow Republican nominee William Morrison.
- 2000 – When Democratic Senator Gus Arzberger left the Legislature and left the Senate District 8 seat open, Griffin ran unopposed for the September 12, 2000 Republican Primary, winning with 5,078 votes, but lost the November 7, 2000 General election to Democratic nominee Marsha Arzberger.
- 2006 – To challenge incumbent House District 25 incumbent Democratic Representatives Manny Alvarez, Griffin ran alongside incumbent Republican Representative Jennifer Burns in the three-way September 12, 2006 Republican Primary, where Griffin placed first with 5,512 votes and Representative Burns placed second; but lost the five-way November 7, 2006 General election, where Representative Alvarez took the first seat and Representative Burns took the second seat.
- 2010 – Challenging incumbent Democratic Senator Manny Alvarez for the District 25 Senate seat, Griffin won the August 24, 2010 Republican Primary with 9,551 votes (63.0%), and won the November 2, 2010 General election with 29,830 votes (55.3%) against Senator Alvarez.
