= Bob Stump (Arizona politician, born 1971) =

American politician

Christopher Robert Stump
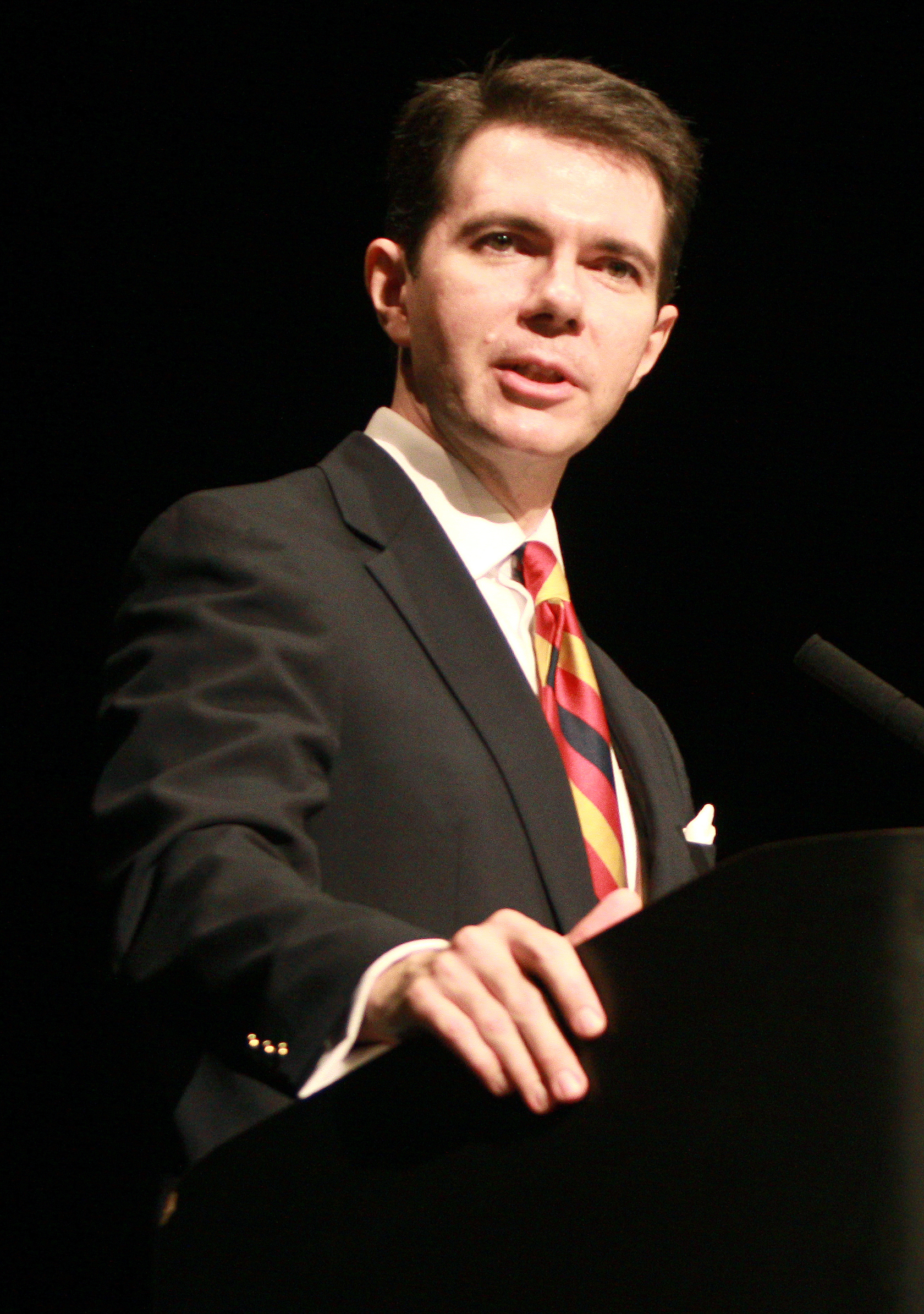

Member of the Arizona Corporation Commission
- In office January 2009 – January 2017
- Succeeded by: Boyd Dunn

Member of the Arizona House of Representatives from the 9th district
- In office 2002–2008 Serving with Phil Hanson, Rick Murphy
- Preceded by: Randy Graf; Marian McClure
- Succeeded by: Debbie Lesko

Personal details
- Born: September 21, 1975 (age 51) Honolulu, Hawaii, U.S.
- Party: Independent
- Education: University of California, Berkeley (BA); Harvard University (MA) Pembroke College, Oxford (MSt)

Christopher Robert Stump (born September 21, 1975) is an American politician who served two terms on the Arizona Corporation Commission from 2009 to 2017. Due to term limits, he was prevented from running for re-election in 2016. Prior to serving on the Commission, Stump served in the Arizona House of Representatives for the 9th district from 2002 to 2008. Prior to running for the legislature, Stump worked as a journalist and freelance writer.

== Early career ==
Stump attended Harvard University, University of Oxford, and the University of California, Berkeley. Stump worked as a journalist and freelance writer for newspapers in Honolulu, Washington, D.C., and Tucson.

== Political career ==
Stump represented District 9 in the Arizona House of Representatives from 2002 to 2008. Stump is Chairman of the Board of the Phoenix Opera.

He was elected to the Arizona Corporation Commission in 2008 and re-elected in 2012. He chaired the Commission from 2013 to 2015.

Stump served on the board of directors of the National Association of Regulatory Commissioners (NARUC); was a member of the Harvard Electricity Policy Group and the Aspen Institute's Society of Fellows; and was an Advisory Council member of the Center for Public Utilities. He also served on the faculty of Law Seminars International and was a member of the NARUC Committee on Critical Infrastructure, which was established after the September 11, 2001 attacks to devise policies to help protect the nation's utility infrastructure from natural disasters and terrorist threats.

During his 2018 campaign for Congress, Stump's use of an abbreviated form of his middle name (Bob, short for Robert) became a source of controversy, as he was accused of using it to associate himself with the late Arizona Congressman Bob Stump.
