= Mark Maiorana =

American politician (born 1956)

Member of the Arizona House of Representatives from the 8th district
- In office January 1999 – January 2003
- Preceded by: Paul Newman

Personal details
- Born: November 8, 1956 (age 69) Detroit, Michigan
- Party: Democratic
- Spouse: Marcia
- Profession: Politician

Mark Maiorana (born November 8, 1956) is a former member of the Arizona House of Representatives. He served in the House from January 1999 through January 2003, serving district 8. After redistricting in 2002, he ran for re-election in District 25, but lost in the Democratic primary to Manuel V. Alvarez and Bobby Lugo.
