= David Bradley (politician) =

American politician (1952–2022)

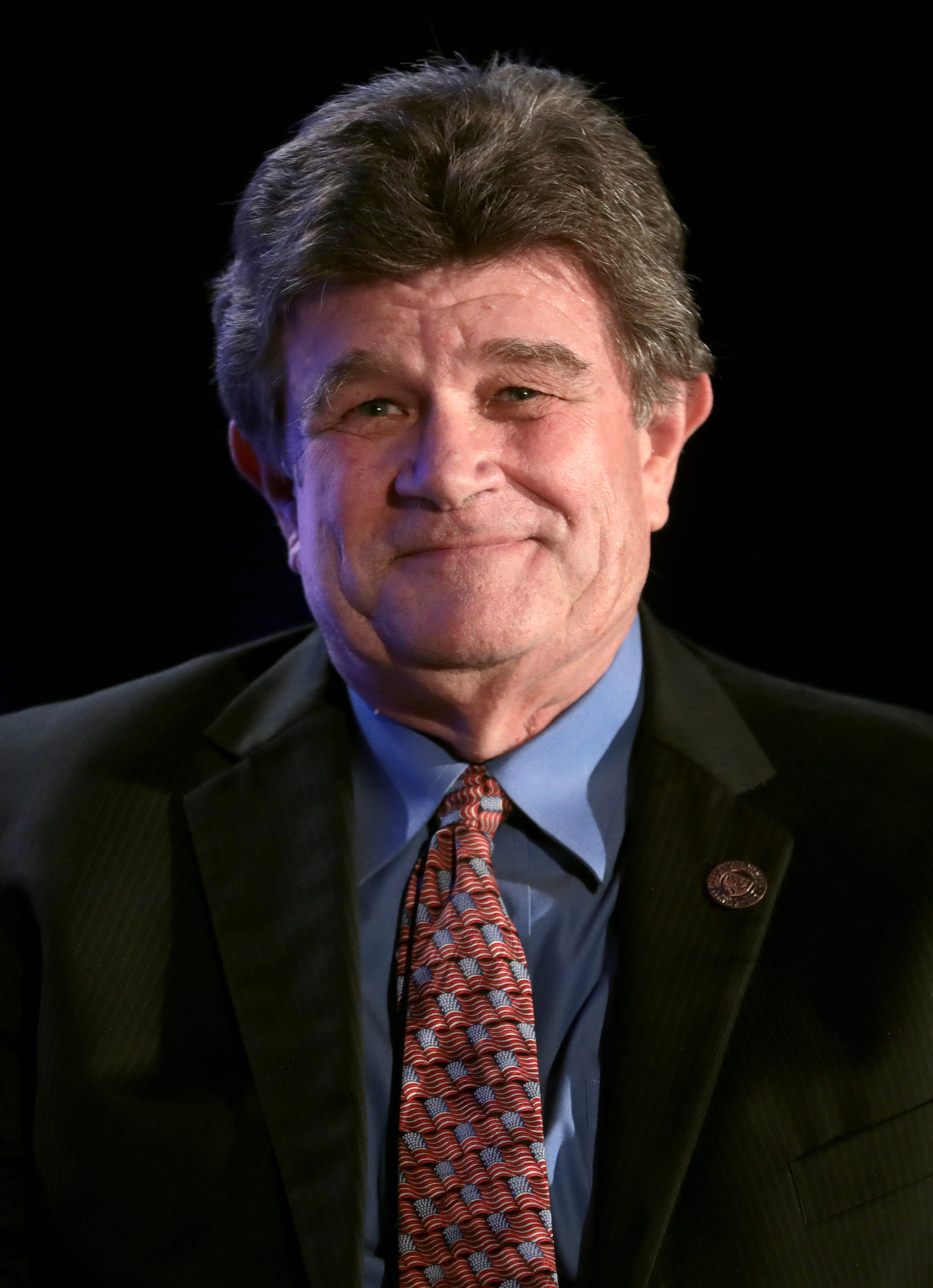
- Bradley in 2019

Minority Leader of the Arizona Senate
- In office January 14, 2019 – January 11, 2021
- Preceded by: Katie Hobbs
- Succeeded by: Rebecca Rios

Member of the Arizona Senate from the 10th district
- In office January 14, 2013 – January 11, 2021
- Preceded by: Linda Gray
- Succeeded by: Kirsten Engel

Member of the Arizona House of Representatives from the 28th district
- In office January 2003 – January 10, 2011 Serving with Theodore Downing (2003–2007); Steve Farley (2007–2011)

Personal details
- Born: November 13, 1952 Seattle, Washington, U.S.
- Died: February 19, 2022 (aged 69) California, U.S.
- Party: Democratic
- Spouse: Debra D'Amore
- Children: 4
- Education: University of Maryland, College Park (BS); Old Dominion University (MEd); University of Phoenix (MBA)

Military service
- Allegiance: United States
- Branch/service: United States Navy
- Years of service: 1972–1980

David T. Bradley (November 13, 1952 – February 19, 2022) was an American politician and a Democratic member of the Arizona Senate representing District 10 from January 14, 2013, to 2021. Bradley served non-consecutively in the Arizona State Legislature from January 2003 until January 10, 2011, in the Arizona House of Representatives District 28 seat. He was a State Senator representing District 10 starting in 2012 after defeating incumbent Frank Antenori (R).

== Education and early life ==
Bradley attended a Catholic seminary as a teenager, where he stated that he was abused by an older seminarian.

Bradley was born in Seattle, Washington. He served in the United States Navy. Bradley earned his BS in psychology from the University of Maryland, his MEd in counseling from Old Dominion University, and his MBA from the University of Phoenix.

== Elections ==
- 2000 When House District 9 incumbent Republican Representatives William McGibbon ran for Arizona Senate and Lou-Ann Preble left the Legislature, leaving both seats open, Bradley ran unopposed in the September 12, 2000, Democratic Primary, winning with 6,486 votes, but in the four-way November 7, 2000, general election, lost to Republican nominees Marian McClure and Randy Graf.
- 2002 Redistricted to District 28, and with incumbent Republican Representatives Carolyn Allen and Wes Marsh both running for Arizona Senate and leaving both seats open, and Republican Representative Edward Poelstra redistricted from District 14, Bradley ran in the five-way September 10, 2002, Democratic Primary, placing second with 5,340 votes; in the November 5, 2002, general election, fellow Democratic nominee Theodore Downing took the first seat and Bradley took the second seat with 22,322 votes ahead of Representative Poelstra.
- 2004 Bradley and Representative Downing were challenged in the three-way September 7, 2004, Democratic Primary; Representative Downing placed first and Bradley placed second with 6,250 votes; in the five-way November 2, 2004, general election, Representative Downing took the first seat and Bradley took the second seat with 37,003 votes ahead of Republican nominees Bill Phillips, Richard Dale, and Libertarian candidate Daniel Hickman.
- 2006 With Democratic Representative Downing running for Arizona Senate and leaving a District 28 seat open, Bradley ran in the four-way September 12, 2006, Democratic Primary, taking second with 8,675 votes; in the three-way November 7, 2006, general election, fellow Democratic nominee Steve Farley took the first seat and Bradley took the second seat with 30,575 votes ahead of Republican nominee Bill Phillips.
- 2008 Bradley and Representative Farley were unopposed for both the September 2, 2008, Democratic Primary where Bradley placed second with 9,568 votes, and the November 2, 2010, general election, where Representative Farley took the first seat and Bradley took the second seat with 43,845 votes.
- 2010 Bradley ran for one of the two open seats on the Arizona Corporation Commission in the three-way August 24, 2010, Democratic Primary and placed second with 139,191 votes; fellow Democratic nominee Jorge Luis Garcia died before the November 2, 2010, general election, where Republican Senator Brenda Burns took the first seat and incumbent Republican Commissioner Gary Pierce took the second seat.
- 2012 Redistricted to District 10, and with incumbent Republican Senator Linda Gray retiring and leaving the Senate District 10 seat open, and Republican Senator Frank Antenori redistricted from District 30, Bradley was unopposed for the August 28, 2012, Democratic Primary, winning with 18,139 votes, and won the November 6, 2012, general election with 48,509 votes (54.7%) against Senator Antenori.
- 2014 Ran against the moderate Republican Mark Morrison. Bradley won and retained his seat as the incumbent.

== Personal life and death ==
Bradley was married to Deborah D'Amore. He died from cancer in California on February 19, 2022, at the age of 69.

Arizona Senate
Preceded by Katie Hobbs	Minority Leader of the Arizona Senate; 2019–2021	Succeeded by Rebecca Rios
