= Edward Poelstra =

American politician

Member of the Arizona House of Representatives from the 14th district
- In office January 2001 – January 2003
- Preceded by: Herschella Horton

Personal details
- Born: August 26, 1970 (age 56) Owosso, Michigan
- Party: Republican
- Profession: Politician

Edward Poelstra (born August 26, 1970) is a former member of the Arizona House of Representatives. He served in the House from January 2001 through January 2003, serving district 14. After redistricting in 2002, he ran for re-election in District 28, but lost in the general election to David Bradley and Ted Downing.
