= Carol Somers =

American politician

Member of the Arizona House of Representatives from the 13th district
- In office January 2001 – January 2003
- Preceded by: Kathleen Dunbar; Andy Nichols

Personal details
- Born: April 20, 1945 (age 81)
- Party: Republican
- Profession: Politician

Carol Somers (born April 20, 1945) was a former member of the Arizona House of Representatives. She served in the House from January 2001 through January 2003, serving district 13. After redistricting in 2002, she ran for re-election in District 26, but lost in the Republican primary to Pete Hershberger and Steve Huffman. She again ran for the House in District 26 in 2006, but lost in the Republican primary. She died in 2011.
