= David Stevens (politician) =

American politician

David W. Stevens
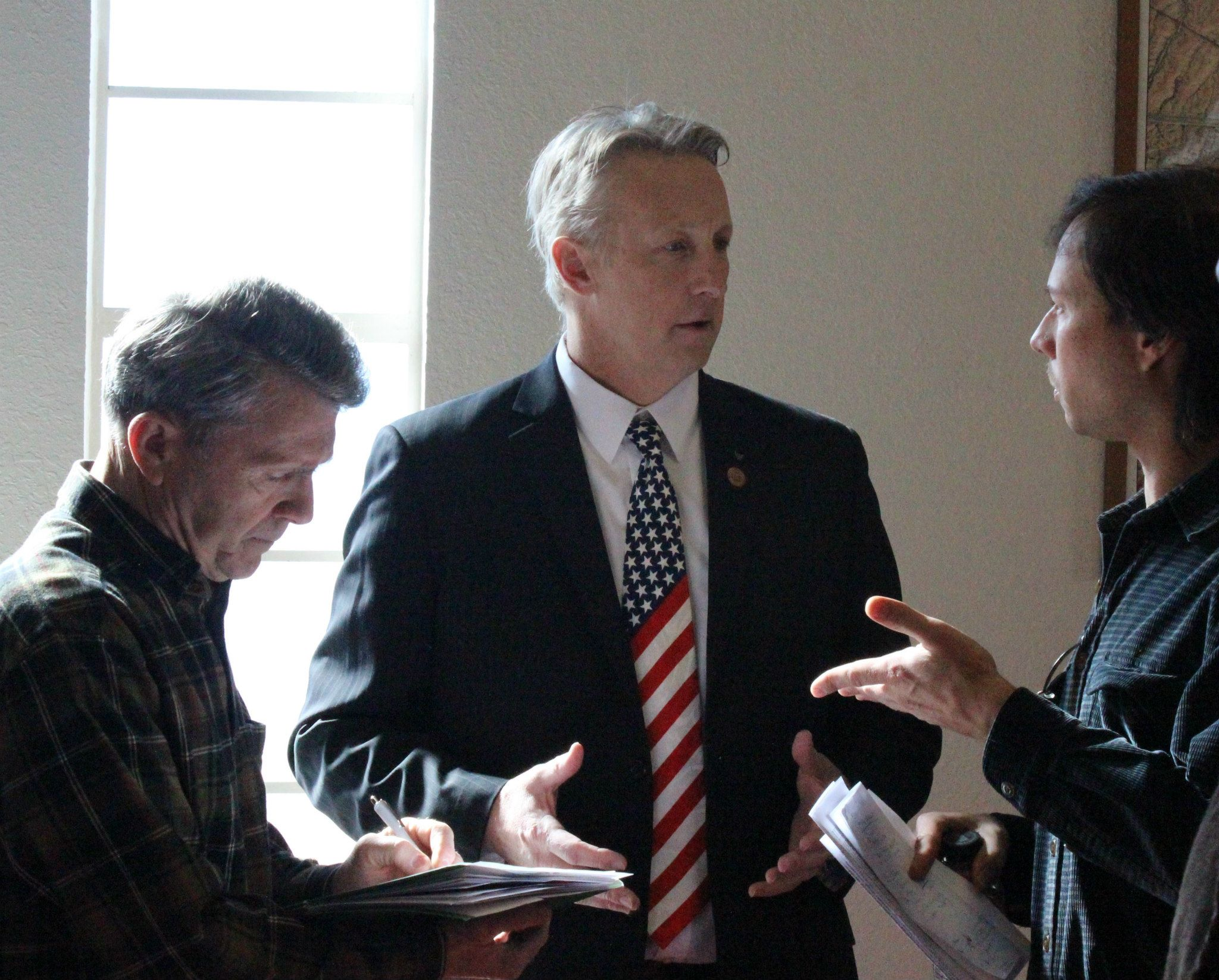

Member of the Arizona House of Representatives
- Succeeded by: Drew John
- Constituency: 25th district (2009–13); 14th district (2013–17)

Personal details
- Party: Republican

David W. Stevens is an American politician and a former Republican member of the Arizona House of Representatives representing District 14 until January 2017. Stevens served consecutively from January 2009 until January 14, 2013, in the District 25 seat.

== Elections ==
- 2020 Incumbent Stevens ran unopposed in the general election to become re-elected Cochise County Recorder receiving 47,652 votes.
- 2016 Stevens defeated Peter Gardner in the general election to become Cochise County Recorder receiving 27,905 votes.
- 2014 Incumbents Stevens and David Gowan defeated Susan Syfert in the Republican primary. Gowan and Stevens defeated James Burton in the general election with Stevens receiving 34,850 votes.
- 2012 Redistricted to District 14, and with incumbent Democratic Representatives Chad Campbell redistricted to District 14 and Debbie McCune Davis redistricted to District 30, and with incumbent Republican Representative David Gowan redistricted from District 30, Stevens and Representative Gowan were unopposed for the August 28, 2012 Republican Primary; Gowan placed first and Stevens placed second with 14,904 votes; Representatives Gowan and Stevens won the four-way November 6, 2012 General election, with Representative Gowan taking the first seat and Stevens taking the second seat with 43,585 votes ahead of Democratic nominees Mark Stonebreaker and Robert Leach.
- 2010 Stevens won the August 24, 2010 Republican Primary, placing first with 10,777 votes; in the four-way November 2, 2010 General election, fellow Republican nominee Peggy Judd took the first seat, and Stevens took the second seat with 25,043 votes, ahead of incumbent Democratic Representative Pat Fleming and Democratic nominee Ruben Ortega.
- 2008 With incumbent Representatives Manny Alvarez (D) running for Arizona Senate and Jennifer Burns (R) leaving the Legislature and leaving both District 25 seats open, Stevens ran in the September 2, 2008 Republican Primary, placing first with 7,010 votes; in the November 2, 2010 General election, Democratic nominee Pat Fleming (who had run for the seat in 2006) took first, and Stevens took the second seat with 28,806 votes ahead of Democratic nominee Ric Boyer and Republican nominee Timothy Davies.
- 2004 Stevens ran in the three-way September 7, 2004 Republican Primary, placing second with 4,864 votes; but lost the four-way November 2, 2004 General election to Representatives Alvarez and Burns.
- 2002 With District 25 incumbent Democratic Representatives Ken Cheuvront running for Arizona Senate and Christine Weason leaving the Legislature, and Democratic Representative Bobby Lugo redistricted from District 8, Stevens ran as a write-in candidate in the September 10, 2002 Republican Primary, placing second with 460 votes, but lost the four-way November 5, 2002 General election to Democratic nominee Manny Alvarez and Republican nominee Jennifer Burns.
