= Bobby Lugo =

American politician

Member of the Arizona House of Representatives from the 8th district
- In office January 2001 – January 2003
- Preceded by: Gail Griffin

Personal details
- Party: Democratic
- Profession: Politician

Bobby Lugo is a former member of the Arizona House of Representatives. He served in the House from January 2001 through January 2003, serving district 8. After redistricting in 2002, he ran for re-election in District 25. Along with Manuel Alvarez he won the Democratic primary, but lost in the general election to Republican Jennifer J. Burns.
