= Rick Murphy =

Arizona politician

Rick Murphy was a Republican member of the Arizona State Senate, representing District 21 (previously District 9) from 2011 to 2015. He has been a realtor since 1992 and is a small business owner.

He served in the Arizona House of Representatives from 2004 to 2010, where he served on numerous committees and was chairman of the Ways & Means Committee. In 2010 he was elected to the Arizona Senate, and re-elected in 2012. He was the chairman of the Senate Government Committee in 2012 and the Judiciary Committee for the 2013–2014 session.

Murphy has been politically active since 1997, although his interest in politics and government began in childhood. He became a Republican precinct committeeman after the 1996 elections and held several state and district Republican Party leadership positions. He is also active in the community and non-partisan issue advocacy, particularly in the areas of taxpayer protection, chronic illness and foster care/adoption issues. He is a past chairman of the Arizona Federation of Taxpayers (now Americans for Prosperity-Arizona), which publishes the annual "Friend of the Taxpayer" rating of the Arizona Legislature. He was a founding and long-time member of the local Hemophilia Association's Camp Committee, which organizes a summer camp for Arizona children with bleeding disorders, served as a volunteer camp counselor for 15 years, and is a past board member. He is also a volunteer Youth Coach for both junior high and high school students in the non-denominational Christian church he attends with his family.

Murphy is a native of Phoenix and lives in Peoria, Arizona with his wife and five adopted children.

Arizona House of Representatives
Preceded by Phil Hanson	Member of the Arizona House of Representatives from the 9th district 2005–2011; Served alongside: Bob Stump, Debbie Lesko	Succeeded by Rick Gray
Arizona Senate
Preceded by Bob Burns	Member of the Arizona Senate from the 9th district 2011–2013	Succeeded by Steve Farley
Preceded by Steve Yarbrough	Member of the Arizona Senate from the 21st district 2013–2015	Succeeded by Debbie Lesko
