= Ted Carpenter (politician) =

American politician (1951–2020)

Member of the Arizona House of Representatives from the 6th district
- In office January 13, 2003 – January 8, 2007
- Preceded by: John Huppenthal; Bob Robson
- Succeeded by: Doug Clark; Sam Crump

Member of the Arizona House of Representatives from the 19th district
- In office January 11, 1999 – January 13, 2003
- Preceded by: David Eberhart
- Succeeded by: Chuck Gray; Gary Pierce

Personal details
- Born: December 7, 1951 Fort Worth, Texas
- Died: November 19, 2020 (aged 68) Gilbert, Arizona
- Party: Republican
- Profession: Politician

Theodore Wayne Carpenter (December 7, 1951 – November 19, 2020) was an American politician who served as a member of the Arizona House of Representatives from 1999 until 2007. He was first elected to the House in November 1998, representing District 19, and was re-elected in 2000. After redistricting in 2002, Carpenter was again re-elected in both 2002 and 2004, now representing District 6. Not eligible to run for the House in 2006 due to Arizona's term limits, he ran for the Arizona State Senate, but lost to Pamela Gorman in the Republican primary. Gorman went on to win the general election.

He died on November 19, 2020, in Gilbert, Arizona at age 68.
