= Robert Cannell =

American politician

Member of the Arizona Senate from the 24th district
- In office January 2003 – January 2007
- Preceded by: Herb Guenther
- Succeeded by: Amanda Aguirre

Member of the Arizona House of Representatives from the 5th district
- Preceded by: Robert McLendon

Member of the Arizona House of Representatives from the 24th district
- Succeeded by: Amanda Aguirre

Personal details
- Born: August 12, 1942 Natick, Massachusetts
- Died: November 18, 2020 (aged 78) Yuma, Arizona
- Party: Democratic
- Spouse: Leslie
- Children: Catherine, Jonathan, and Christopher
- Profession: Pediatrician, Politician

Robert Cannell (born August 12, 1942) is a pediatrician who was a member of the Arizona State Senate and the Arizona House of Representatives. He was first elected to the House in November 2000, representing District 5. After redistricting in 2002, he won re-election to the House in District 24. However, when Herb Guenther, who had won the State Senate seat, did not take the oath of office, Cannell was appointed by Yuma County Board of Supervisors to replace him. Cannell won re-election to the Senate in 2004. He did not run for re-election in 2006.
