= David Gowan =

American politician

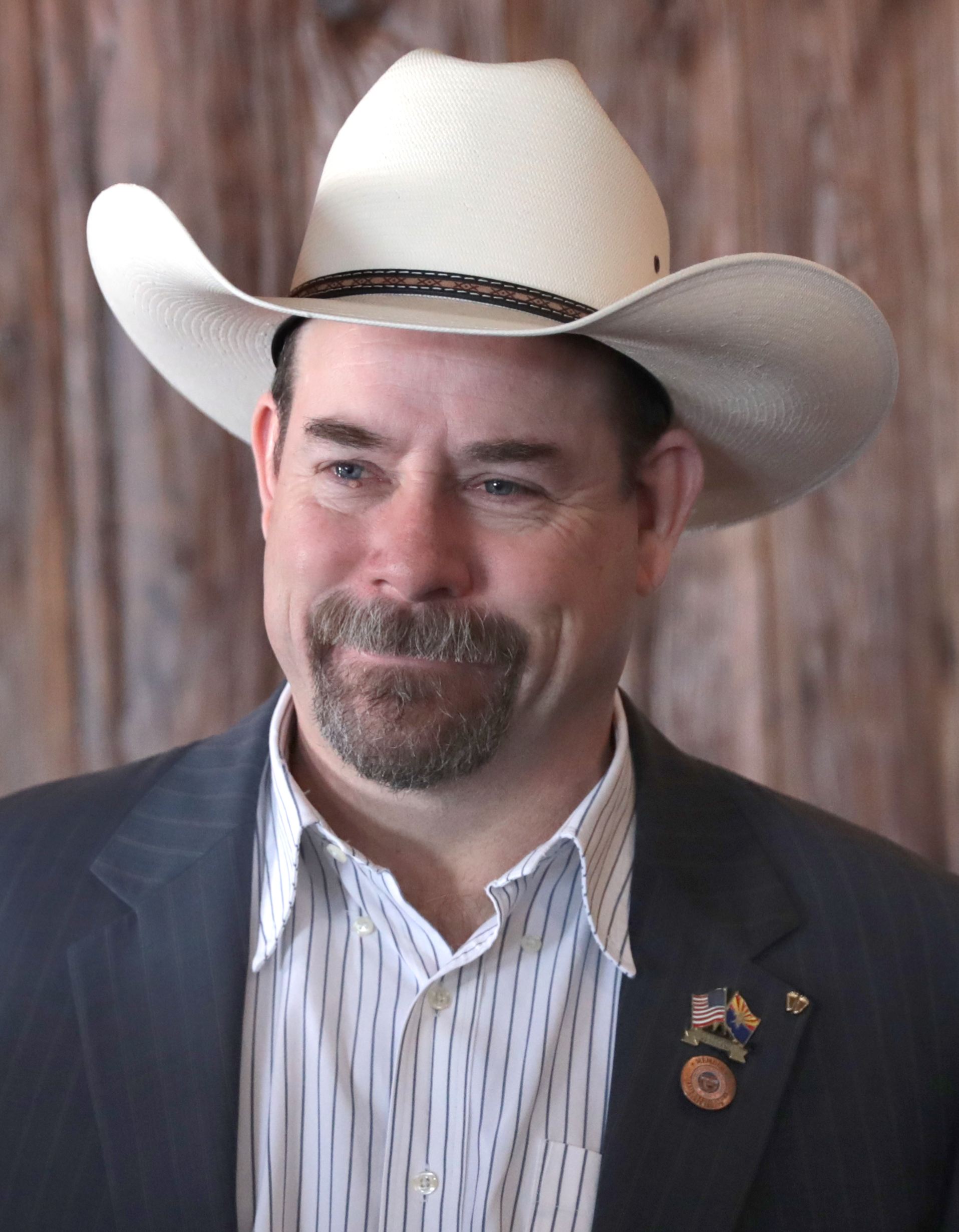
- Gowan in 2022

52nd Speaker of the Arizona House of Representatives
- In office January 12, 2015 – January 9, 2017
- Preceded by: Andy Tobin
- Succeeded by: J. D. Mesnard

Member of the Arizona Senate
- Incumbent
- Assumed office January 9, 2023
- Preceded by: Lupe Contreras
- Constituency: 19th district
- In office January 14, 2019 – January 9, 2023
- Preceded by: Gail Griffin
- Succeeded by: Warren Petersen
- Constituency: 14th district

Member of the Arizona House of Representatives
- In office January 2009 – January 9, 2017 Serving with David Stevens
- Preceded by: Jonathan Paton
- Succeeded by: Becky Nutt
- Constituency: 14th district (2013–2017); 30th district (2009–2013)

Personal details
- Party: Republican
- Education: University of Arizona
- Website: Campaign website

David M. Gowan Sr. is an American politician currently serving as a member of the Arizona Senate from the 19th district since 2023, having previously represented the 14th district from 2019 to 2023. A member of the Republican Party, Gowan served in the Arizona House of Representatives from 2009 to 2017, serving as the House's speaker from 2015 to 2017.

On October 5, 2015, Gowan announced his candidacy for Arizona's 1st congressional district, but withdrew before the Republican primary.

== Career before politics ==
Prior to entering politics, Gowan was a magazine distributor and karate instructor.

== Political career ==
Gowan made three unsuccessful bids for elected office before gaining election to the state Legislature. He was first elected to the Arizona House of Representatives in 2008, representing Legislative District 30 which encompassed a large part of Southern Arizona, primarily Santa Cruz County, Arizona. Between 2009–2010 he served as Vice Chair of the Military Affairs and Public Safety Committee. In 2010, he sponsored and introduced the House version of Arizona SB 1070.

In 2013 he was elected as Majority Leader of the Republican Caucus.

In late 2013, Gowan was one of a number of Republican lawmakers, represented by the Goldwater Institute who sued Governor Jan Brewer in an attempt to block the state's acceptance of Medicaid expansion under the Patient Protection and Affordable Care Act. The Arizona Supreme Court ultimately rejected the suit (originally called Biggs v. Cooper and then Biggs v. Betlach) in 2017. Gowan maneuvered to oust fellow Republican Bob Robson from the chairmanship of the powerful Rules Committee due to Robson's support for Medicaid expansion.

In the 2015 legislative session he was chosen as Speaker of the Arizona House of Representatives. In the internal party race for the position, he defeated J.D. Mesnard and Eddie Farnsworth, and became the first state House speaker from southern Arizona in more than 30 years.

During his tenure as Speaker, Gowan faced controversy including for spending House funds on redecorating.

In 2016, the Arizona Capitol Times revealed that Gowan had used a state vehicle while campaigning, collected per diem pay while campaigning and not conducting governmental business, and received mileage reimbursements while driving a state vehicle. Gowan denied any intentional violation of the law, and repaid the state more than $12,000 after his use of travel funds was publicly reported. Gowan referred himself to the Arizona Attorney General's Office; In a memorandum released in 2017, the AG's Office decided not to pursue charges, concluding that although the "substantial disregard for determining whether state funds for per diem, mileage and official travel were paid pursuant to proper authority" was potentially a violation of state law, "the violations were not undertaken knowingly or intentionally but were instead attributable to negligence" and therefore did not meet the criminal intent standard for prosecution.

As state House speaker, Gowan generated controversy in April 2016 for revoking access of reporters to the House floor unless they agreed to an extensive criminal and civil background check. The publisher of the Arizona Capitol Times suggested that Gowan's change in the rule was in retaliation for its investigative journalism. After the sudden changes in the rules was criticized by the press corps, Gowan rescinded his directive. Gowan's former press aide, Stephanie Grisham, later became a confidant to Melania and Donald Trump, and White House press secretary during the Trump administration.

In 2016, Gowan sought the Republican nomination for the seat in the U.S. House of Representatives from the Arizona's 1st congressional district, but withdrew shortly before the Republican primary and endorsed Gary Kiehne.

In 2018, Gowan ran for and won seat in the Legislative District 14 seat in the Arizona Senate, succeeding Gail Griffin.

In 2020, Gowan sponsored legislation to change the Arizona Corporation Commission (the state's public utilities regulator) from being an elected body to being a body appointed by the governor with confirmation by the state Senate.

In 2021, Gowan sponsored legislation that would allow the Arizona state Legislature to override election results; he later dropped the bill.

== Personal life ==
Gowan graduated from the University of Arizona with a degree in Secondary Education and Social Studies. He is currently married with two children and lives in Sierra Vista, Arizona.
