= Albert Tom =

American politician

Member of the Arizona House of Representatives from the 2nd district
- In office January 2005 – January 2009
- Preceded by: Jack Jackson Jr. Sylvia Laughter
- Succeeded by: Christopher Deschene

Personal details
- Born: 1956
- Party: Democratic
- Profession: Politician

Albert Tom is a former member of the Arizona House of Representatives from 2005 through 2009. He was first elected to the House in November 2004, and was re-elected in 2006. He lost in the Democratic primary in 2008 to fellow incumbent Thomas Chabin and Christopher Deschene, both of whom went on to win in the general election. He made another attempt to regain his seat in the 2010 election, but again lost in the Democratic primary, this time to Tom Chabin and Albert Hale.
