= Ernest Bustamante =

American politician

Ernest Bustmante

Member of the Arizona House of Representatives from the 23rd district
- In office January 2003 – January 2005
- Preceded by: Mark A. Clark
- Succeeded by: Pete Rios

Personal details
- Party: Democratic
- Profession: Politician

Ernest Bustmante is a former member of the Arizona House of Representatives from January 2003 until January 2005, representing the newly redistricted District 23. He ran for re-election in 2004 along with Cheryl Chase, but was defeated in the Democratic primary by Pete Rios. In 2008 he ran again for the House in District 23, and won the Democratic primary along with Barbara McGuire. However, while McGuire won, Bustamante lost in the general election to Frank Pratt. He again ran in 2010, and won the Democratic primary, along with McGuire, but in the general election they both lost to Pratt and John Fillmore. He ran once again in 2012, this time in District 8, after redistricting. He and Emily Verdugo won the Democratic primary, but they both lost in the general election, to Pratt and T. J. Shope.
