= Colette Rosati =

American politician

Colette Rosatti

Member of the Arizona House of Representatives from the 8th district
- In office January 2003 – January 2007
- Succeeded by: John Kavanagh

Personal details
- Born: Detroit, Michigan
- Party: Republican
- Spouse: Nick
- Children: Nick Jr., Renee
- Profession: Politician

Colette Rosatti was a member of the Arizona House of Representatives from January 2003 until January 2007. She was first elected to the House in November 2002, representing the new re-districted District 8. She won re-election in 2004. She chose not to run for re-election to the House in 2006, instead challenging incumbent Carolyn S. Allen in the Republican primary for the Arizona State Senate. She lost in the primary, and Allen went on to win re-election in the general election.
