= Bill Wagner III =

American politician

Member of the Arizona House of Representatives from the 3rd district
- In office January 2003 – January 2005
- Succeeded by: Trish Groe; Nancy McLain

Personal details
- Party: Republican
- Profession: Politician

Bill Wagner III is a former member of the Arizona House of Representatives from January 2003 until January 2005. He was first elected to the House in November 2002, representing the newly aligned District 3, after redistricting. In 2004, Wagner decided to run for the Arizona State Senate in District 3, rather than attempting to be re-elected to the House. He lost in the Republican primary, coming in third behind Joe Hart, and Ron Gould. Gould ran unopposed in the general election.
