= Tom Boone =

American politician

Member of the Arizona House of Representatives from the 4th district
- In office January 2003 – January 2011
- Succeeded by: Jack Harper

Personal details
- Party: Republican
- Profession: Politician

Tom Boone was a member of the Arizona House of Representatives from 2003 through 2011. He was first elected to the House in November 2002, and was re-elected three times, in 2004, 2006, and 2008. In his final term, he served as House Majority Leader. He was ineligible to run again in 2010 due to Arizona's term limits.
