= Mark Thompson (Arizona politician) =

American politician

Member of the Arizona House of Representatives from the 17th district
- In office January 2003 – January 2005
- Succeeded by: Laura Knaperek

Personal details
- Party: Republican

Mark Thompson is a former member of the Arizona House of Representatives from January 2003 until January 2005. He was elected to the House in November 2002, representing the newly aligned District 17, after redistricting. In 2004, Thompson ran for re-election, and was one of the two Republicans to win in the primary, but lost in the general election to Democratic incumbent Meg Burton Cahill and fellow Republican Laura Knaperek.
