= William Konopnicki =

American politician (1945–2012)

William "Bill" Konopnicki (April 7, 1945 – October 17, 2012) was an Arizona politician. He and his wife were also the owners of radio station KTHQ as well as several others. Konopnicki was a Republican.

Konopnicki was born in Michigan and moved with his parents to Yuma, Arizona when he was five. He studied at Arizona Western College and Arizona State University. He later received a doctors degree in education from the University of Arizona. Konopnicki worked as a school teacher before he became a businessman. He ran various radio stations and also owned several McDonald's restaurants. He was also on the faculty of Eastern Arizona College for a time.

Konopnicki is a Latter-day Saint. Among other positions in the LDS Church he served as a bishop and a stake president.

Konopnicki was a member of the Arizona State House beginning in 2002 to 2010. He opposed efforts to have Arizona engage in enforcing federal immigration laws.

== Sources ==
- State House bio of Konopnicki
- Arizona Republic article on Konopnicki
- Obituary for Konopnicki
- Arizona Republic obit for Konopnicki
