= Clancy Jayne =

American politician

Member of the Arizona House of Representatives from the 6th district
- In office January 2003 – January 2005
- Succeeded by: Pamela Gorman

Personal details
- Party: Republican
- Profession: Politician

Clancy Jayne is a former member of the Arizona House of Representatives from January 2003 until January 2005. He was elected to the House in November 2002, representing the newly aligned District 6, after redistricting. In 2004, Jayne ran for re-election, but lost in the Republican primary to Pamela Gorman.
