= Ben R. Miranda =

American politician (1949–2013)

Member of the Arizona House of Representatives from the 16th district
- In office January 2003 – January 2011
- Preceded by: Carlos Avelar
- Succeeded by: Ruben Gallego; Catherine H. Miranda

Personal details
- Born: 1949 Sugar Land, Texas, U.S.
- Died: November 15, 2013 (aged 63–64)
- Party: Democratic
- Spouse: Catherine H. Miranda
- Children: 2
- Education: Phoenix College; Arizona State University; Sandra Day O'Connor College of Law
- Profession: Attorney, politician

Ben R. Miranda (1949 – November 2013) was a member of the Arizona House of Representatives from 2003 through 2011. He was first elected to the House in November 2002, and was re-elected three times, in 2004, 2006, and 2008. He was ineligible to run again in 2010 due to Arizona's term limits.

Miranda died in November 2013 at the age of 64.
