= Carole Hubs =

American politician

Member of the Arizona House of Representatives from the 4th district
- In office January 2003 – January 2005
- Succeeded by: Judy Burges

Personal details
- Party: Republican
- Profession: Politician

Carole Hubs is a former member of the Arizona House of Representatives who served from January 2003 until January 2005. She was elected to the House in November 2002, representing the newly aligned District 4, after redistricting. In 2004, Hubs ran for re-election, but lost in the Republican primary to Judy Burges.
