= Arizona's 19th legislative district =

American legislative district

- Map of District 19: Approved January 21, 2022
- Senator: David Gowan (R)
- House members: Gail Griffin (R); Lupe Diaz (R)
- Registration: 43.12% Republican; 23.19% Democratic; 32.20% Other
- Demographics: 61% White; 3% Black/African American; 2% Native American; 3% Asian; 29% Hispanic
- Population: 230,476
- Voting-age population: 182,745
- Registered voters: 146,048

Arizona's 19th legislative district is one of 30 in the state, consisting of all of Greenlee County and sections of Cochise County, Graham County, Pima County, and Santa Cruz County. As of 2023, there are 96 precincts in the district, with a total registered voter population of 146,048. The district has an overall population of 230,476.

Following the 2020 United States redistricting cycle, the Arizona Independent Redistricting Commission (AIRC) redrew legislative district boundaries in Arizona. According to the AIRC, the district is outside of competitive range and considered leaning Republican.

== Political representation ==
The district is represented in the 56th Arizona State Legislature, which convenes from January 1, 2023, to December 31, 2024, by David Gowan (R-Sierra Vista) in the Arizona Senate and by Gail Griffin (R-Sierra Vista) and Lupe Diaz (R-Benson) in the Arizona House of Representatives.

Name	Image	Residence	Office	Party
David Gowan		Sierra Vista	State senator	Republican
Gail Griffin		Sierra Vista	State representative	Republican
Lupe Diaz		Benson	State representative	Republican

== Election results ==
The 2022 elections were the first in the newly drawn district.

=== Arizona Senate ===
2022 Arizona's 19th Senate district election
Party	Candidate	Votes	%
Republican	David Gowan (incumbent)	67,200	100
Total votes		67,200	100
Republican hold			

=== Arizona House of Representatives ===
2022 Arizona House of Representatives election, 19th district
Party	Candidate	Votes	%
Republican	Gail Griffin (incumbent)	53,891	38.58
Republican	Lupe Diaz (incumbent)	49,561	35.48
Democratic	Sanda Clark	36,242	25.94
Total votes		139,694	100.00
Republican hold			
Republican hold			

== See also ==
- List of Arizona legislative districts
- Arizona State Legislature
