= Phil Lopes =

American politician

Member of the Arizona House of Representatives from the 27th district
- In office January 2003 – January 2011
- Preceded by: Meg Burton Cahill; Laura Knaperek
- Succeeded by: Sally Ann Trujillo Gonzales; Macario Saldate IV

Personal details
- Born: June 30, 1941 (age 85) Dos Palos, California
- Party: Democratic
- Spouse: Pamela
- Children: Tobin, Mark
- Profession: Politician

Phil Lopes (born June 30, 1941) was a member of the Arizona House of Representatives from 2003 through 2011. He was first elected to the House in November 2002, and was re-elected three times, in 2004, 2006, and 2008. He was ineligible to run again in 2010 due to Arizona's term limits.
