= Lucy Mason =

American politician

Lucy Mason is a politician from Arizona. Mason served in the Arizona House of Representatives for eight years.

== Early life and education ==
Mason was educated at Arizona State University, the University of Houston, Northern Arizona University and the University of Arizona.

== Political Career ==
Mason began her political career as a member of the Prescott City Council. She served for eight years in the Arizona State legislature, four of them as chair of the State House energy committee. She ran for the Arizona Corporation Commission in 2014. The Arizona Solar Energy Industries Association (AriSEIA) Board of Directors is pleased to announce it has hired former Republican State Representative Lucy Mason as its Executive Director November 2014.

== Personal life ==
Mason is a Latter-day Saint.
