= Sylvia Laughter =

American politician (c. 1959 – 2022)

Member of the Arizona House of Representatives from the 2nd district
- In office January 2003 – January 2005
- Succeeded by: Ann Kirkpatrick; Albert Tom

Member of the Arizona House of Representatives from the 3rd district
- In office January 1999 – January 2003
- Preceded by: Joe Hart; John Verkamp

Personal details
- Born: c. 1959 Baby Rocks, Arizona, U.S.
- Died: October 15, 2022 (aged 63) Mesa, Arizona, U.S.
- Party: Independent
- Education: Brigham Young University
- Profession: Politician

Sylvia Laughter (c. 1959 – October 15, 2022) was an American politician who was a member of the Arizona House of Representatives from January 1999 until January 2005. She was the first Navajo woman to serve in the Arizona legislature, as well as the first and only politically independent legislator to serve in the state legislature since Arizona's statehood in 1912.

== Biography ==
Laughter was first elected to the House in November 1998 as a Democrat, representing District 3. She was re-elected in 2000, and again after redistricting in 2002, representing District 2. In February 2003, she changed her party affiliation from Democrat to independent. She ran for re-election in the November 2004 election but was defeated by Democrats Ann Kirkpatrick and Albert Tom. Between 2004 and 2010 she changed her party affiliation back to Democrat, and ran for the Arizona State Senate in 2010 in District 2. She lost in the primary to Jack Jackson, Jr.

She died from complications of COVID-19 in Mesa, Arizona, on October 15, 2022, at the age of 63.
