= Warde Nichols =

American politician

Member of the Arizona House of Representatives from the 21st district
- In office January 2003 – January 2011
- Succeeded by: Tom Forese; Javan D. Mesnard

Personal details
- Born: March 29, 1969 (age 57) Gilbert, Arizona
- Party: Republican
- Spouse: Paula
- Children: Sage, Alexandria, Grant
- Profession: Politician

Warde V. Nichols (born March 23, 1969) was a member of the Arizona House of Representatives from 2003 through 2011. He was first elected to the House in November 2002, and was re-elected three times, in 2004, 2006, and 2008. He was ineligible to run again in 2010 due to Arizona's term limits.
