= Bill Arnold (politician) =

American politician

Member of the Arizona House of Representatives from the 12th district
- In office January 2003 – January 2005
- Succeeded by: Jerry Weiers

Personal details
- Party: Republican
- Profession: Politician

Bill Arnold is a former member of the Arizona House of Representatives from January 2003 until January 2005. He was elected to the House in November 2002, representing the newly aligned District 12, after redistricting. In 2004, Arnold ran for re-election, but lost in the Republican primary to Jerry Weiers.
