= Deb Gullett =

American politician

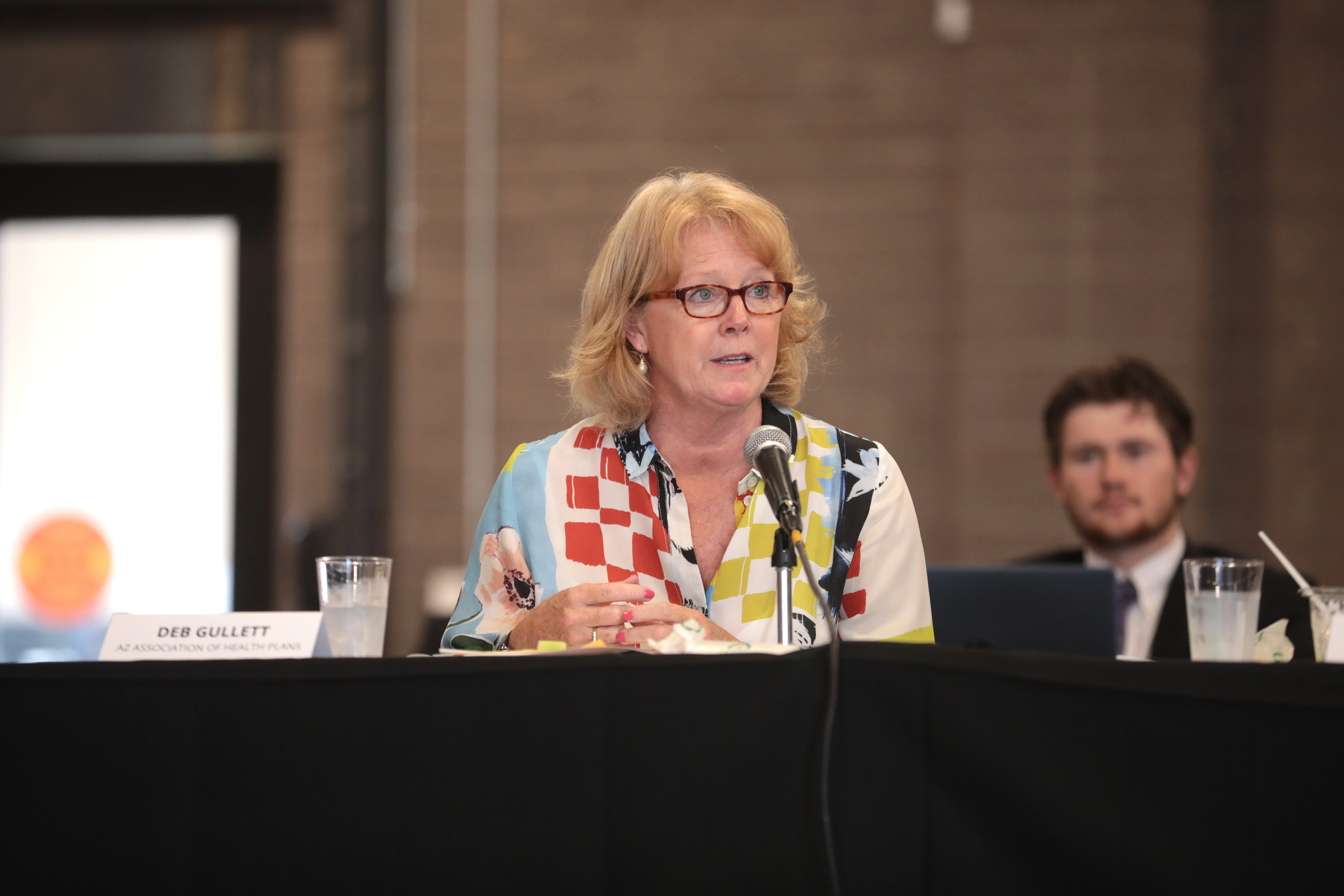

Member of the Arizona House of Representatives from the 18th district
- In office January 2001 – January 2003
- Preceded by: Susan Muir Gerard; Barry Wong

Member of the Arizona House of Representatives from the 11th district
- In office January 2003 – January 2005
- Succeeded by: John Allen

Personal details
- Born: April 23, 1956 (age 70) Des Moines, Iowa
- Party: Republican
- Spouse: Wes
- Children: 3
- Profession: Politician

Deb Gullett (born April 23, 1956) is a former member of the Arizona House of Representatives from January 2001 until January 2005. She was first elected to the House in November 2000, representing District 18, and was re-elected in 2002 after re-districting, to the 11th District. She did not run for re-election in 2004.
