= Marian McClure =

American politician

Member of the Arizona House of Representatives from the 9th district
- In office January 2001 – January 2003
- Preceded by: W. A. McGibbon; Lou-Ann Preble

Member of the Arizona House of Representatives from the 30th district
- In office January 2003 – January 2009
- Succeeded by: Frank Antenori; David Gowan

Personal details
- Born: July 10, 1942 (age 84) Oakland, California
- Party: Republican
- Profession: Politician

Marian McClure (born July 10, 1942) is a former member of the Arizona House of Representatives, initially representing the 9th District before redistricting in 2002 moved her to the 30th District. She was first elected to the House in November 2000. She won re-election in 2002, 2004, and 2006. Due to Arizona term limits, she was ineligible to run for re-election in 2008. Instead, she ran for the Arizona State Senate, where she lost in the Republican primary to incumbent Frank Antenori, who went on to re-election in the general election.
