= Manuel Alvarez (politician) =

American politician

Member of the Arizona Senate from the 25th district
- In office January 2009 – January 2011
- Preceded by: Marsha Arzberger
- Succeeded by: Gail Griffin

Personal details
- Party: Democratic
- Profession: Politician

Manuel Alvarez was a member of the Arizona State Senate from 2009 through 2011. He was elected to the Senate in November 2008, and served one term. In his bid for re-election, he was defeated in the 2010 election by Gail Griffin. Prior to his service in the Senate, Alvarez served in the U.S. Army from 1962 to 1965.
