= Ted Downing =

American politician

Ted (Theodore) Downing

Member of the Arizona House of Representatives from the 28th district
- In office January 1999 – January 2003
- Succeeded by: Steve Farley

Personal details
- Party: Democratic
- Profession: Politician

Ted Downing is a former member of the Arizona House of Representatives from January 2003 until January 2007. In 2000 he ran for the State House of Representatives for District 13. Along with Gabrielle Giffords, he was one of the two candidates to win the Democratic primary. However, in the general election, while Giffords won, Downing came in third, losing to Carol Somers. In November 2002, he ran again for the house, this time in District 28 following redistricting, and won. He won re-election to the House in 2004. In 2006, Downing decided not to seek re-election to the House, and chose to run for the State Senate. However, he lost in the Democratic primary to Paula Aboud, who ran unopposed in the general election. He ran again in the 2010 election for the Senate seat from District 28, this time as an independent, finishing a distant third in the election.
