= Cheryl Chase (politician) =

American politician

Member of the Arizona House of Representatives from the 7th district
- In office January 2001 – January 2003
- Preceded by: Rebecca Rios

Member of the Arizona House of Representatives from the 23rd district
- In office January 2003 – January 2007
- Succeeded by: Barbara McGuire

Personal details
- Born: February 5, 1953 (age 73)
- Party: Democratic Party (2000-2005) Republican (2005-Present)
- Spouse: Rodney
- Profession: Politician

Cheryl Chase (born February 5, 1953) is a former member of the Arizona House of Representatives from January 2001 until January 2007. She was first elected to the House in November 2000, representing District 7. After redistricting in 2002, Chase was reelected in both 2002, now representing District 23, and 2004. Chase did not run for re-election to the House in 2006, instead choosing to run for the Arizona State Senate. She lost in the general election to Rebecca Rios.
