= Phil Hanson (politician) =

American politician

Member of the Arizona House of Representatives from the 17th district
- In office January 2001 – January 2003
- Preceded by: Bob Burns; Jean McGrath

Member of the Arizona House of Representatives from the 9th district
- In office January 2003 – January 2005
- Succeeded by: Rick Murphy

Personal details
- Born: October 3, 1932 (age 93) Phoenix, Arizona
- Party: Republican
- Spouse: Marsha
- Children: Phil Jr., Leslie
- Profession: Politician

Phil Hanson (born October 3, 1932) is a former member of the Arizona House of Representatives from January 2001 until January 2005. He was first elected to the House in November 2000, representing District 17, and was re-elected in 2002 after re-districting, to the 9th District. He ran for re-election in 2004, along with his fellow incumbent, Bob Stump, but lost in the Republican primary to Rick Murphy.

In 2004 he was inducted to the Arizona Veterans Hall of Fame for his civic and military service.
