= Pete Hershberger =

American politician (born 1949)

Member of the Arizona House of Representatives from the 26th district
- In office 2001–2008

Personal details
- Born: June 4, 1949 (age 77) Denver, Colorado, U.S.
- Party: Republican (previously); Democratic (currently)
- Education: Colorado College, University of Arizona

Pete Hershberger (born 4 June 1949) is an American politician who served as a member of the Arizona House of Representatives, representing the 26th District from 2001 to 2008. He previously served in the State House, representing the 12th District from 1983 to 1985.

== Education ==
Hershberger received his BS from Colorado College in 1971 and obtained his MEd. in Counseling and Guidance from the University of Arizona in 1977.

== Personal life ==
Hershberger is single. He is an Episcopalian.

== Organizations ==
Hershberger is a member of many prestigious organizations which include:

- Member/Board of Directors of the Rotary Club of Tucson from 1991–present
- Member of the Southwest Leadership Program for State and Local Government in 2001
- Director Pima County Representative, State Board of Directors for Community Colleges of Arizona from 1998–2001
- Member of Leadership Class, Greater Tucson Leadership in 2000
