= Jennifer Burns (politician) =

American politician

Member of the Arizona House of Representatives from the 25th district
- In office January 2003 – January 2009
- Preceded by: Ken Cheuvront; Christine Weason
- Succeeded by: Patricia Fleming; David Stevens

Personal details
- Party: Republican
- Profession: Politician

Jennifer Burns was a member of the Arizona House of Representatives for three terms. She represented the 25th District, winning for the first time in November 2002. She won re-election in 2004 and 2006. She lost to Russell Jones during her unsuccessful re-election bid in 2008. Even though she was eligible to run in the 2008 election, she chose not to.
