= Randy Graf =

American politician

Randy J. Graf

Majority Whip of the Arizona House of Representatives

Member of the Arizona House of Representatives from the 30th district
- In office 2000–2004

Personal details
- Born: November 3, 1958 (age 67) U.S.
- Party: Republican
- Occupation: Politician

Randy J. Graf (born November 3, 1958) is a former member of the Arizona State House. He was the Republican nominee for Arizona's 8th congressional district in 2006.

== Background ==
Graf grew up in Green Bay, Wisconsin and graduated from Southwest High School in 1977. Graf has worked as a club pro and is a former member of the Professional Golfers' Association of America.

Graf was elected in 1994 to serve on the governing board of the Continental School District. In 1998 he was elected Board President. He also served as the government relations liaison to the Green Valley Chamber of Commerce.

In 2000, Graf was elected to the Arizona House of Representatives from the 30th District. He served there from 2000 to 2004. During his second term in the legislature, Graf was elected as House Majority Whip. He also served as the state chairman of the American Legislative Exchange.

In 2004, Graf resigned from the state house to run in the Republican primary for the 8th District against 10-term incumbent Jim Kolbe. It was the first time Kolbe had faced a serious primary challenge since winning the seat in 1984. Graf ran well to Kolbe's right. He campaigned with a "get tough" message on illegal immigration, a "hot button" issue, especially for residents living along Arizona's border with Mexico, which has become a major crossing point for smuggling. He also aligned himself with U.S. Representatives Tom Tancredo of Colorado and Steve King of Iowa, who proposed enhanced border security. Graf was also a senior advisor for Proposition 200, an initiative passed by Arizona voters in 2004 to prevent welfare and voter fraud. He was no less conservative on other issues; he is anti-abortion, against same-sex marriage, in favor of continued U.S. support for Israel, and in favor of tort reforms and medical care choice as a way of lowering health insurance rates. Ultimately, Graf took 42 percent of the primary vote. By comparison, Kolbe's previous primary opponents hadn't cleared 30 percent.

In 2004, Graf appeared on The Daily Show as the butt of a mock interview titled "A Round of Shots." Ed Helms asked him about his introduction of a bill in the Arizona legislature that would allow people to bring concealed handguns into bars .

== 2006 congressional campaign ==
Kolbe did not run for re-election in 2006, and Graf immediately jumped into the race. The national Republican leadership was somewhat cool toward Graf, believing he was too conservative for a district that has historically been a bastion of moderate Republicanism. The National Republican Congressional Committee took the unusual step of endorsing Kolbe's former campaign manager, Steve Huffman, whom Kolbe had already endorsed as his successor. However, another moderate Republican, former state party chairman Mike Hellon, was also in the field. Huffman and Hellon split the moderate vote, allowing Graf to win with a plurality of 42 percent.

Graf faced Democrat Gabby Giffords and Libertarian David Nolan in the November 7, 2006, general election. However, Kolbe refused to endorse him. With Graf sinking in the polls, the NRCC pulled $1 million worth of advertising in the 8th—a step that, by most accounts, effectively handed the seat to Giffords.

Graf was defeated by Giffords in the general election by a 54.1%-42.2% margin.
