= 2010 Arizona House of Representatives election =

- November 2, 2010

All 60 seats in the Arizona House 31 seats needed for a majority
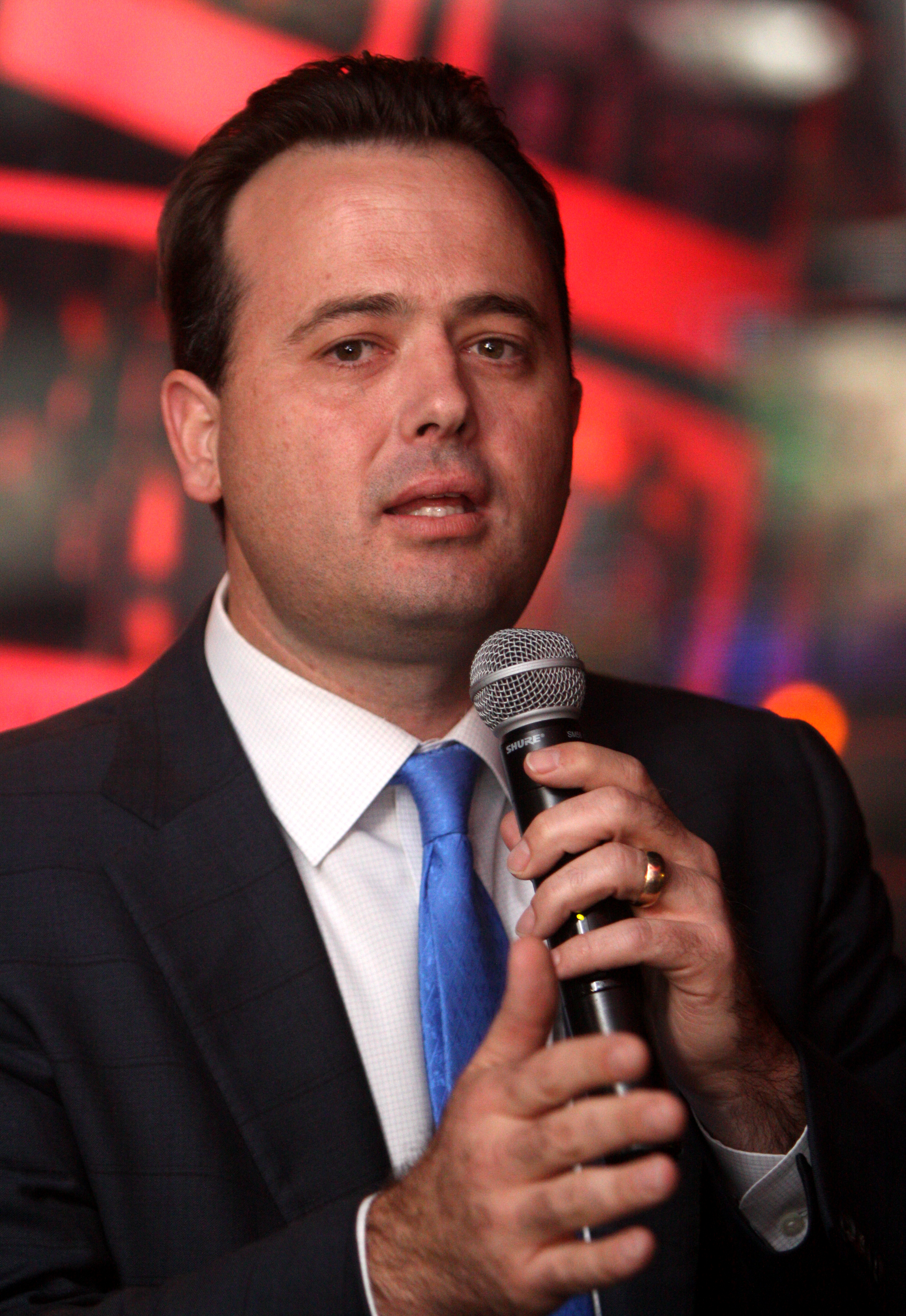

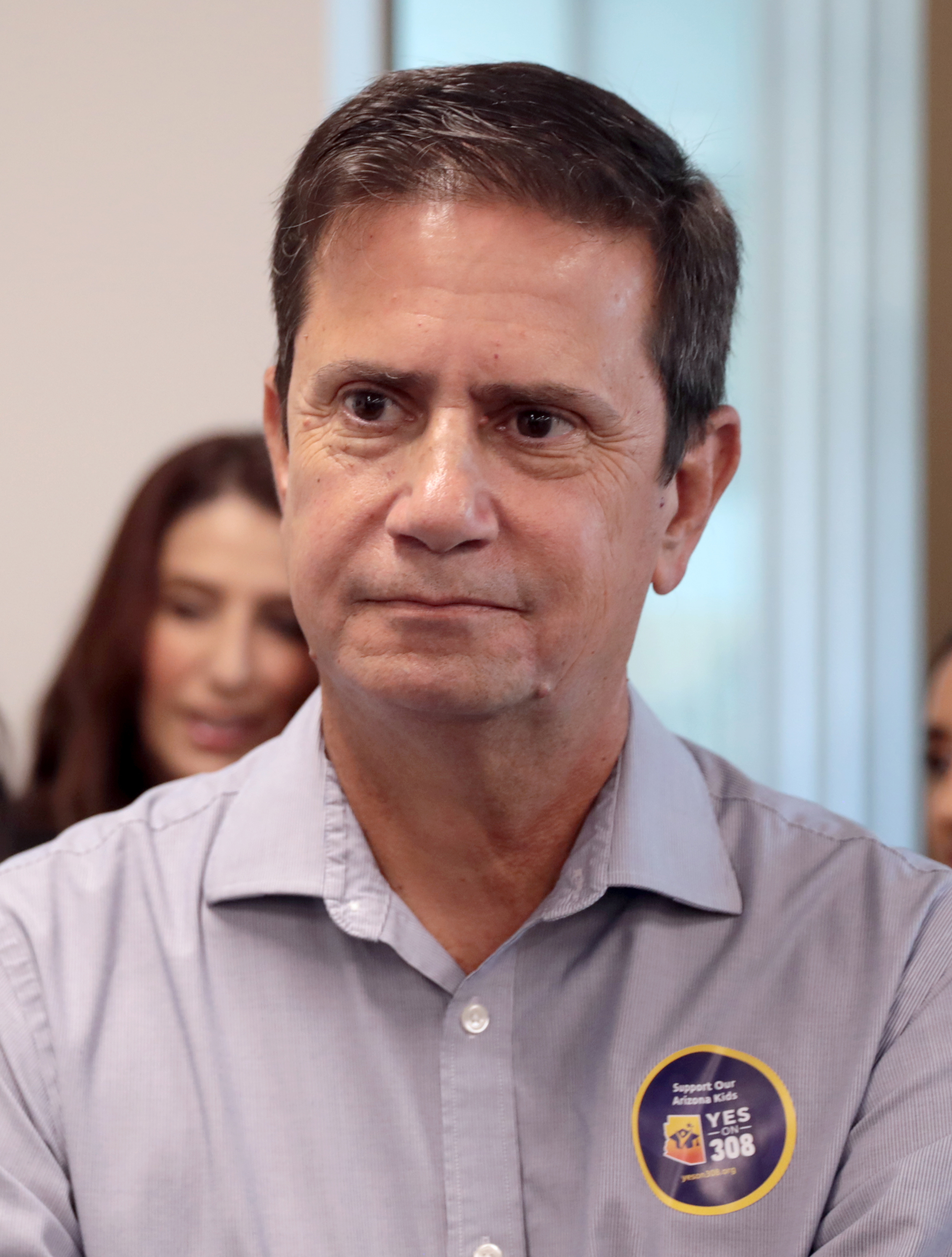
	Majority party	Minority party
Leader	Kirk Adams	David Lujan (retired)
Party	Republican	Democratic
Leader's seat	19th - Mesa	15th - Phoenix
Last election	35	25
Seats after	40	20
Seat change	▲5	▼5
- Results: Democratic hold Republican hold Republican gain
Speaker before election
Kirk Adams
Republican
Elected Speaker
Kirk Adams
Republican

The 2010 Arizona House of Representatives election took place on Tuesday, November 2, 2010, with the primary election held on Tuesday, August 24, 2010. Arizona voters elected all 60 members of the Arizona House of Representatives in multi-member districts to serve two-year terms.

The election coincided with United States national elections and Arizona state elections, including U.S. Senate, U.S. House, Arizona Governor, and Arizona Senate.

Following the previous election in 2008, Republicans held a 35-to-25-seat majority over Democrats. Republicans expanded their majority in 2010, winning 40 seats. At 20 members, Democrats experienced a net loss of five seats.

== Retiring Incumbents ==
=== Democrats ===
1. District 2: Christopher Clark Deschene (Note: Ran for Arizona Secretary of State, but was defeated in the general election by Republican Ken Bennett.)
2. District 5: Jack A. Brown
3. District 13: Martha Garcia
4. District 14: Robert Meza (term-limited) (Note: Elected to the Arizona State Senate.)
5. District 15: Kyrsten Sinema (Note: Elected to the Arizona State Senate.)
6. District 15: David Lujan (Note: Ran for Arizona Attorney General, but was defeated in the Democratic primary by Felecia Rotellini.)
7. District 16: Ben Miranda (term-limited)
8. District 17: David Schapira (Note: Elected to the Arizona State Senate.)
9. District 27: Phil Lopes (term-limited)
10. District 27: Olivia Cajero Bedford (term-limited) (Note: Elected to the Arizona State Senate.)
11. District 28: David Bradley (term-limited) (Note: Ran for Arizona Corporation Commission, but was defeated in the general election by Republicans Brenda Burns and Gary Pierce.)

=== Republicans ===
1. District 1: Lucy Mason (term-limited)
2. District 4: Tom Boone (term-limited)
3. District 5: Bill Konopnicki (term-limited) (Note: Ran for the Arizona State Senate, but was defeated in the Republican primary by incumbent Sylvia Tenney Allen.)
4. District 7: Ray Barnes (term-limited) (Note: Ran for the Arizona State Senate, but was defeated in the Republican primary by Nancy Barto.)
5. District 7: Nancy Barto (Note: Elected to the Arizona State Senate.)
6. District 8: Michele Reagan (term-limited) (Note: Elected to the Arizona State Senate.)
7. District 9: Richard A. "Rick" Murphy (Note: Elected to the Arizona State Senate.)
8. District 11: Adam Driggs (Note: Elected to the Arizona State Senate.)
9. District 19: Rich Crandall (Note: Elected to the Arizona State Senate.)
10. District 20: John McComish (Note: Elected to the Arizona State Senate.)
11. District 21: Warde V. Nichols (term-limited)
12. District 21: Steve Yarbrough (term-limited) (Note: Elected to the Arizona State Senate.)
13. District 22: Andy Biggs (term-limited) (Note: Elected to the Arizona State Senate.)

== Incumbents Defeated in Primary Election ==
=== Democrat ===
1. District 16: Cloves Campbell Jr.

=== Republican ===
1. District 22: Laurin Hendrix

== Incumbents Defeated in General Election ==
=== Democrats ===
1. District 20: Rae Waters
2. District 23: Barbara McGuire
3. District 25: Patricia "Pat" Fleming
4. District 26: Nancy Young Wright

== Predictions ==
Source	Ranking	As of
Governing	Safe R	November 1, 2010

== Aftermath ==
The newly elected members served in the 50th Arizona State Legislature, during which Republican Kirk Adams was originally re-elected as Speaker of the Arizona House on January 10, 2011. (Note: Kirk Adams was re-elected by acclamation as Speaker for the 50th legislature.) He resigned on April 28, 2011. Republican Andy Tobin was elected to fill the Speaker vacancy the same day.

== Summary of results ==
Italics denote an open seat held by the incumbent party; bold text denotes a gain for a party.

District	Incumbent	Party	Elected Representative	Outcome
1st	Andy Tobin	Rep	Andy Tobin	Rep Hold
1st	Lucy Mason	Rep	Karen Fann	Rep Hold
2nd	Thomas E. "Tom" Chabin	Dem	Thomas E. "Tom" Chabin	Dem Hold
2nd	Christopher Clark Deschene	Dem	Albert Hale	Dem Hold
3rd	Nancy G. McLain	Rep	Nancy G. McLain	Rep Hold
3rd	Doris Goodale	Rep	Doris Goodale	Rep Hold
4th	Judy M. Burges	Rep	Judy M. Burges (Note: Republican Representative Judy M. Burges resigned on January 23, 2012 and was appointed by the Maricopa County Board of Supervisors to fill the Senate vacancy in Legislative District 4. Phil Lovas (R) was appointed on February 21, 2012 by the Maricopa County Board of Supervisors to fill the House vacancy in Legislative District 4.)	Rep Hold
4th	Tom Boone	Rep	Jack Harper	Rep Hold
5th	Bill Konopnicki	Rep	Brenda Barton	Rep Hold
5th	Jack A. Brown	Dem	**Chester Crandell**	**Rep Gain**
6th	Carl Seel	Rep	Carl Seel	Rep Hold
6th	Amanda Reeve (Note: Republican Representative Sam Crump resigned February 1, 2010 to campaign for a seat in the United States Congress. Amanda Reeve (R) was appointed by the Maricopa County Board of Supervisors to fill Mr. Crump's unexpired term as Representative of District 6 on February 17, 2010.)	Rep	Amanda Reeve	Rep Hold
7th	Ray Barnes	Rep	Heather Carter	Rep Hold
7th	Nancy Barto	Rep	David Burnell Smith	Rep Hold
8th	John Kavanagh	Rep	John Kavanagh	Rep Hold
8th	Michele Reagan	Rep	Michelle Ugenti	Rep Hold
9th	Debbie Lesko	Rep	Debbie Lesko	Rep Hold
9th	Richard A. "Rick" Murphy	Rep	Rick Gray	Rep Hold
10th	James Weiers	Rep	James Weiers	Rep Hold
10th	Kimberly Yee (Note: Republican Representative D. R. Quelland was removed from office on May 27, 2010. Kimberly Yee (R) was appointed by the Maricopa County Board of Supervisors on August 2, 2010 to fill Mr. Quelland's unexpired term.)	Rep	Kimberly Yee	Rep Hold
11th	Eric Meyer	Dem	Eric Meyer	Dem Hold
11th	Adam Driggs	Rep	Kate Brophy McGee	Rep Hold
12th	Jerry P. Weiers	Rep	Jerry P. Weiers	Rep Hold
12th	Steve Montenegro	Rep	Steve Montenegro	Rep Hold
13th	Anna Tovar (Note: Democratic Representative Steve Gallardo won re-election in 2008; however, he did not take the Oath of Office at the beginning of the next term in 2009. Anna Tovar (D) was appointed by the Maricopa County Board of Supervisors to fill Mr. Gallardo's unexpired term as Representative of District 13 on February 2, 2009 and was sworn in on February 3, 2009.)	Dem	Anna Tovar	Dem Hold
13th	Martha Garcia	Dem	Richard Miranda (Note: Democratic Representative Richard Miranda resigned on February 20, 2012 from the House. Martín J. Quezada (D) was appointed by the Maricopa County Board of Supervisors on March 2, 2012 to fill the House vacancy in Legislative District 13.)	Dem Hold
14th	Chad Campbell	Dem	Chad Campbell	Dem Hold
14th	Robert Meza	Dem	Debbie McCune Davis	Dem Hold
15th	Kyrsten Sinema	Dem	Lela Alston	Dem Hold
15th	David Lujan	Dem	Katie Hobbs	Dem Hold
16th	Ben Miranda	Dem	Catherine H. Miranda	Dem Hold
16th	Cloves Campbell Jr.	Dem	Ruben Gallego	Dem Hold
17th	Ed Ableser	Dem	Ed Ableser	Dem Hold
17th	David Schapira	Dem	Ben Arredondo (Note: Democratic Representative P. Ben Arredondo resigned from the House on October 5, 2012. Given both the proximity to the end of the term in December and that the legislature was in recess for the remainder of the session, the Maricopa County Board of Supervisors decided not to replace Arredondo and simply left the seat vacant.)	Dem Hold
18th	Steve Court	Rep	Steve Court	Rep Hold
18th	Cecil P. Ash	Rep	Cecil P. Ash	Rep Hold
19th	Kirk Adams	Rep	Kirk Adams (Note: Republican Representative and Speaker Kirk Adams resigned on April 28, 2011 from the House to campaign for a seat in Congress. Justin Pierce (R) was appointed by the Maricopa County Board of Supervisors on May 23, 2011 and sworn in as a Member of the House of Representatives on May 25, 2011 to fill the House vacancy in Legislative District 19.)	Rep Hold
19th	Rich Crandall	Rep	Justin Olson	Rep Hold
20th	John McComish	Rep	Bob Robson	Rep Hold
20th	Rae Waters	Dem	**Jeff Dial**	**Rep Gain**
21st	Steve Yarbrough	Rep	Javan Daniel "J.D." Mesnard	Rep Hold
21st	Warde V. Nichols	Rep	Thomas "Tom" Forese	Rep Hold
22nd	Andy Biggs	Rep	Edwin W. "Eddie" Farnsworth	Rep Hold
22nd	Laurin Hendrix	Rep	Steve R. Urie	Rep Hold
23rd	Franklin M. "Frank" Pratt	Rep	Franklin M. "Frank" Pratt	Rep Hold
23rd	Barbara McGuire	Dem	**John Fillmore**	**Rep Gain**
24th	Lynne Pancrazi	Dem	Lynne Pancrazi	Dem Hold
24th	Russell "Russ" Jones	Rep	Russell "Russ" Jones	Rep Hold
25th	David Stevens	Rep	David Stevens	Rep Hold
25th	Patricia "Pat" Fleming	Dem	**Peggy Judd**	**Rep Gain**
26th	Vic Williams	Rep	Vic Williams	Rep Hold
26th	Nancy Young Wright	Dem	**Terri Proud**	**Rep Gain**
27th	Phil Lopes	Dem	Sally Ann Trujillo Gonzales	Dem Hold
27th	Olivia Cajero Bedford	Dem	Macario Saldate IV	Dem Hold
28th	Steve Farley	Dem	Steve Farley	Dem Hold
28th	David Bradley	Dem	Bruce Wheeler	Dem Hold
29th	Matt Heinz	Dem	Matt Heinz	Dem Hold
29th	Daniel Patterson	Dem	Daniel Patterson (Note: Re-elected in 2010 as a Democrat, Representative Daniel Patterson switched political party affiliation to Independent on April 2, 2012. On April 11, 2012, Patterson then resigned from the House. On April 23, 2012, Nicholas "Nick" Fontana (I) was appointed by the Pima County Board of Supervisors to fill the House vacancy in Legislative District 29.)	Dem Hold
30th	David Gowan	Rep	David Gowan	Rep Hold
30th	Ted Vogt (Note: Republican Representative Frank R. Antenori was appointed by the Pima County Board of Supervisors to fill Mr. Jonathan Paton's unexpired Senate term on March 2, 2010. Ted Vogt (R) was appointed by the Pima County Board of Supervisors on March 16, 2010 to fill Mr. Antenori's unexpired term.)	Rep	Ted Vogt	Rep Hold

== Detailed results ==
Sources for election results:

=== District 1 ===
Primary Election Results
Party	Candidate	Votes	%
Republican Party Primary Results
Republican	Andy Tobin (incumbent)	21,779	43.93%
Republican	Karen Fann	14,651	29.56%
Republican	Noel Campbell	13,141	26.51%
Total votes		49,571	100.00%
Democratic Party Primary Results
Democratic	Lindsay Bell	10,398	100.00%
Total votes		10,398	100.00%

General Election Results
Party	Candidate	Votes	%
Republican	Andy Tobin (incumbent)	46,401	39.76%
Republican	Karen Fann	41,082	35.20%
Democratic	Lindsay Bell	29,214	25.03%
Total votes		116,697	100.00%
Republican hold			
Republican hold			

=== District 2 ===
Primary Election Results
Party	Candidate	Votes	%
Democratic Party Primary Results
Democratic	Albert Hale	12,012	46.56%
Democratic	Tom Chabin (incumbent)	6,222	24.12%
Democratic	Albert Tom	4,929	19.11%
Democratic	Pat Carr	2,634	10.21%
Total votes		25,797	100.00%
Libertarian Party Primary Results
Libertarian	Frank Mulligan	76	100.00%
Total votes		76	100.00%

General Election Results
Party	Candidate	Votes	%
Democratic	Albert Hale	30,164	51.87%
Democratic	Tom Chabin (incumbent)	22,789	39.19%
Libertarian	Frank Mulligan	5,195	8.93%
Total votes		58,148	100.00%
Democratic hold			
Democratic hold			

=== District 3 ===
Primary Election Results
Party	Candidate	Votes	%
Republican Party Primary Results
Republican	Doris Goodale (incumbent)	11,930	37.90%
Republican	Nancy McLain (incumbent)	10,296	32.71%
Republican	Ray Cullison II	9,254	29.40%
Total votes		31,480	100.00%

General Election Results
Party	Candidate	Votes	%
Republican	Nancy McLain (incumbent)	34,978	50.29%
Republican	Doris Goodale (incumbent)	34,581	49.71%
Total votes		69,559	100.00%
Republican hold			
Republican hold			

=== District 4 ===
Primary Election Results
Party	Candidate	Votes	%
Republican Party Primary Results
Republican	Judy M. Burges (incumbent)	24,331	41.15%
Republican	Jack W. Harper	23,198	39.23%
Republican	Tim Zobel	6,039	10.21%
Republican	Eric Sheats	5,558	9.40%
Total votes		59,126	100.00%
Democratic Party Primary Results
Democratic	Karina Guerrero	11,258	100.00%
Total votes		11,258	100.00%

General Election Results
Party	Candidate	Votes	%
Republican	Judy M. Burges (incumbent)	60,124	40.44%
Republican	Jack W. Harper	56,422	37.95%
Democratic	Karina Guerrero	32,134	21.61%
Total votes		148,680	100.00%
Republican hold			
Republican hold			

=== District 5 ===
Primary Election Results
Party	Candidate	Votes	%
Republican Party Primary Results
Republican	Brenda Barton	11,595	39.10%
Republican	Chester Crandell	9,975	33.63%
Republican	Keith Alexander	8,088	27.27%
Total votes		29,658	100.00%
Democratic Party Primary Results
Democratic	Bill Shumway	7,478	53.58%
Democratic	Prescott Winslow	6,479	46.42%
Democratic	David P. Rodriguez (Note: The candidate ran a write-in campaign in this election.)	0	0.00%
Total votes		13,957	100.00%

General Election Results
Party	Candidate	Votes	%
Republican	Brenda Barton	32,884	33.99%
Republican	Chester Crandell	30,890	31.93%
Democratic	Bill Shumway	17,478	18.07%
Democratic	Prescott Winslow	15,489	16.01%
Total votes		96,741	100.00%
Republican hold			
Republican gain from Democratic			

=== District 6 ===
Primary Election Results
Party	Candidate	Votes	%
Republican Party Primary Results
Republican	Amanda Reeve (incumbent)	7,596	21.50%
Republican	Carl Seel (incumbent)	7,298	20.66%
Republican	David E. Fitzgerald III	7,261	20.55%
Republican	Steve Kaiser	4,628	13.10%
Republican	John Adam Kowalski	4,355	12.33%
Republican	Rick Robinson	2,158	6.11%
Republican	Clint Van Wuffen	2,035	5.76%
Total votes		35,331	100.00%
Democratic Party Primary Results
Democratic	Teri Conrad	6,934	100.00%
Total votes		6,934	100.00%
Libertarian Party Primary Results
Libertarian	William Barker (Note: Despite coming in first place in the Libertarian primary as a write-in candidate, William Barker did not advance to the general election.)	4	100.00%
Total votes		4	100.00%
Green Party Primary Results
Green	Deborah ODowd	1	100.00%
Total votes		1	100.00%

General Election Results
Party	Candidate	Votes	%
Republican	Amanda Reeve (incumbent)	34,555	37.47%
Republican	Carl Seel (incumbent)	31,508	34.17%
Democratic	Teri Conrad	20,754	22.50%
Green	Deborah ODowd	5,405	5.86%
Total votes		92,222	100.00%
Republican hold			
Republican hold			

=== District 7 ===
Primary Election Results
Party	Candidate	Votes	%
Republican Party Primary Results
Republican	David Smith	8,389	23.17%
Republican	Heather Carter	6,665	18.41%
Republican	Kristen Burroughs	5,845	16.15%
Republican	Craig Barton	5,297	14.63%
Republican	Michael Edward Farrar	4,222	11.66%
Republican	Howard Lee Sprague	3,152	8.71%
Republican	Michael Coskun	2,632	7.27%
Total votes		36,202	100.00%
Democratic Party Primary Results
Democratic	Don Chilton	4,903	51.27%
Democratic	Peter Royers	4,660	48.73%
Total votes		9,563	100.00%
Libertarian Party Primary Results
Libertarian	Jim Iannuzo	87	100.00%
Total votes		87	100.00%

General Election Results
Party	Candidate	Votes	%
Republican	Heather Carter	37,254	33.53%
Republican	David Smith	34,007	30.61%
Democratic	Don Chilton	18,897	17.01%
Democratic	Peter Royers	16,560	14.90%
Libertarian	Jim Iannuzo	4,395	3.96%
Total votes		111,113	100.00%
Republican hold			
Republican hold			

=== District 8 ===
Primary Election Results
Party	Candidate	Votes	%
Republican Party Primary Results
Republican	John Kavanagh (incumbent)	18,081	40.24%
Republican	Michelle Ugenti	9,581	21.32%
Republican	Paula Pennypacker	5,947	13.24%
Republican	Michael Blaire	5,936	13.21%
Republican	Ray Mahoubi	2,707	6.02%
Republican	Eric Ulis	2,679	5.96%
Total votes		44,931	100.00%
Democratic Party Primary Results
Democratic	John Kriekard	7,854	100.00%
Total votes		7,854	100.00%

General Election Results
Party	Candidate	Votes	%
Republican	John Kavanagh (incumbent)	42,867	39.33%
Republican	Michelle Ugenti	38,055	34.91%
Democratic	John Kriekard	28,084	25.76%
Total votes		109,006	100.00%
Republican hold			
Republican hold			

=== District 9 ===
Primary Election Results
Party	Candidate	Votes	%
Republican Party Primary Results
Republican	Debbie Lesko (incumbent)	14,498	45.58%
Republican	Rick Gray	9,055	28.47%
Republican	Diane M. Douglas	8,256	25.95%
Total votes		31,809	100.00%
Democratic Party Primary Results
Democratic	Shirley McAllister	8,837	100.00%
Total votes		8,837	100.00%

General Election Results
Party	Candidate	Votes	%
Republican	Debbie Lesko (incumbent)	32,423	39.96%
Republican	Rick Gray	28,459	35.08%
Democratic	Shirley McAllister	20,249	24.96%
Total votes		81,131	100.00%
Republican hold			
Republican hold			

=== District 10 ===
Primary Election Results
Party	Candidate	Votes	%
Republican Party Primary Results
Republican	James Weiers (incumbent)	7,218	34.28%
Republican	Kimberly Yee (incumbent)	6,925	32.88%
Republican	Doug "Q" Quelland	4,371	20.76%
Republican	Bill Adams	2,545	12.09%
Total votes		21,059	100.00%
Democratic Party Primary Results
Democratic	Jackie Thrasher	5,515	59.91%
Democratic	Aaron Jahneke	3,690	40.09%
Total votes		9,205	100.00%

General Election Results
Party	Candidate	Votes	%
Republican	Kimberly Yee (incumbent)	19,485	30.11%
Republican	James Weiers (incumbent)	18,237	28.18%
Democratic	Jackie Thrasher	14,770	22.82%
Democratic	Aaron Jahneke	12,226	18.89%
Total votes		64,718	100.00%
Republican hold			
Republican hold			

=== District 11 ===
Primary Election Results
Party	Candidate	Votes	%
Republican Party Primary Results
Republican	Kate Brophy McGee	11,155	30.87%
Republican	Eric West	7,847	21.71%
Republican	Shawnna Bolick	7,173	19.85%
Republican	Bev Kraft	6,159	17.04%
Republican	Dusti Morris (Note: The candidate withdrew from the election late, after ballots were already finalized.)	3,806	10.53%
Total votes		36,140	100.00%
Democratic Party Primary Results
Democratic	Eric Meyer (incumbent)	10,671	100.00%
Total votes		10,671	100.00%

General Election Results
Party	Candidate	Votes	%
Republican	Kate Brophy McGee	32,589	35.67%
Democratic	Eric Meyer (incumbent)	30,151	33.01%
Republican	Eric West	28,611	31.32%
Total votes		91,351	100.00%
Republican hold			
Democratic hold			

=== District 12 ===
Primary Election Results
Party	Candidate	Votes	%
Republican Party Primary Results
Republican	Jerry Weiers (incumbent)	16,423	54.83%
Republican	Steve Montenegro (incumbent)	13,531	45.17%
Total votes		29,954	100.00%
Democratic Party Primary Results
Democratic	Angela Cotera	10,087	100.00%
Total votes		10,087	100.00%
Green Party Primary Results
Green	Justin Dahl	79	100.00%
Total votes		79	100.00%

General Election Results
Party	Candidate	Votes	%
Republican	Steve Montenegro (incumbent)	36,623	33.40%
Republican	Jerry Weiers (incumbent)	35,724	32.58%
Democratic	Angela Cotera	30,543	27.85%
Green	Justin Dahl	6,762	6.17%
Independent	Penny Lewis	4	0.00%
Total votes		109,656	100.00%
Republican hold			
Republican hold			

=== District 13 ===
Primary Election Results
Party	Candidate	Votes	%
Democratic Party Primary Results
Democratic	Anna Tovar (incumbent)	3,356	39.99%
Democratic	Richard Miranda	3,310	39.44%
Democratic	Martín J. Quezada	1,727	20.58%
Total votes		8,393	100.00%

General Election Results
Party	Candidate	Votes	%
Democratic	Richard Miranda	12,990	50.72%
Democratic	Anna Tovar (incumbent)	12,619	49.28%
Total votes		25,609	100.00%
Democratic hold			
Democratic hold			

=== District 14 ===
Primary Election Results
Party	Candidate	Votes	%
Democratic Party Primary Results
Democratic	Debbie McCune-Davis	3,042	51.03%
Democratic	Chad Campbell (incumbent)	2,919	48.97%
Total votes		5,961	100.00%

General Election Results
Party	Candidate	Votes	%
Democratic	Debbie McCune-Davis	9,584	51.14%
Democratic	Chad Campbell (incumbent)	9,157	48.86%
Total votes		18,741	100.000%
Democratic hold			
Democratic hold			

=== District 15 ===
Primary Election Results
Party	Candidate	Votes	%
Democratic Party Primary Results
Democratic	Katie Hobbs	4,353	34.84%
Democratic	Lela Alston	4,347	34.80%
Democratic	Ken Clark	3,793	30.36%
Total votes		12,493	100.00%
Republican Party Primary Results
Republican	Paul Yoder	3,913	50.73%
Republican	Caroline B. Condit	3,801	49.27%
Total votes		7,714	100.00%
Green Party Primary Results
Green	Luisa Evonne Valdez	68	100.00%
Total votes		68	100.00%

General Election Results
Party	Candidate	Votes	%
Democratic	Katie Hobbs	15,885	30.83%
Democratic	Lela Alston	15,167	29.43%
Republican	Paul Yoder	8,972	17.41%
Republican	Caroline B. Condit	8,424	16.35%
Independent	Les White	1,739	3.37%
Green	Luisa Evonne Valdez	1,343	2.61%
Total votes		51,530	100.00%
Democratic hold			
Democratic hold			

=== District 16 ===
Primary Election Results
Party	Candidate	Votes	%
Democratic Party Primary Results
Democratic	Ruben Gallego	4,149	26.12%
Democratic	Catherine H. Miranda	3,476	21.88%
Democratic	Cloves Campbell (incumbent)	3,182	20.03%
Democratic	Jim Munoz, Jr.	2,281	14.36%
Democratic	Sandra Gonzales	1,955	12.31%
Democratic	Cristy Lopez	842	5.30%
Total votes		15,885	100.00%
Republican Party Primary Results
Republican	Michael Gular	3,407	100.00%
Total votes		3,407	100.00%
Green Party Primary Results
Green	Ángel Torres	31	100.00%
Total votes		31	100.00%

General Election Results
Party	Candidate	Votes	%
Democratic	Catherine H. Miranda	19,197	39.46%
Democratic	Ruben Gallego	18,365	37.75%
Republican	Michael Gular	8,551	17.58%
Green	Ángel Torres	2,532	5.21%
Total votes		48,645	100.00%
Democratic hold			
Democratic hold			

=== District 17 ===
Primary Election Results
Party	Candidate	Votes	%
Democratic Party Primary Results
Democratic	Ed Ableser (incumbent)	6,260	50.52%
Democratic	P. Ben Arredondo	6,131	49.48%
Total votes		12,391	100.00%
Republican Party Primary Results
Republican	Donald Hawker	9,059	87.57%
Republican	Steve May	1,173	11.34%
Republican	Bob Bush	113	1.09%
Total votes		10,345	100.00%
Libertarian Party Primary Results
Libertarian	Damian Trabel	76	54.68%
Libertarian	Cristian Dumitrescu	63	45.32%
Total votes		139	100.00%
Green Party Primary Results
Green	Gregor Knauer	56	96.55%
Green	Clint Clement	2	3.45%
Total votes		58	100.00%

General Election Results
Party	Candidate	Votes	%
Democratic	P. Ben Arredondo	22,458	29.44%
Democratic	Ed Ableser (incumbent)	21,153	27.73%
Republican	Donald Hawker	14,277	18.72%
Republican	Steve May	14,048	18.42%
Libertarian	Damian Trabel	1,638	2.15%
Libertarian	Cristian Dumitrescu	1,429	1.87%
Green	Gregor Knauer	1,260	1.65%
Independent	Marcus Gaethje	16	0.02%
Total votes		76,279	100.00%
Democratic hold			
Democratic hold			

=== District 18 ===
Primary Election Results
Party	Candidate	Votes	%
Republican Party Primary Results
Republican	Cecil Ash (incumbent)	8,187	50.66%
Republican	Steve Court (incumbent)	7,974	49.34%
Total votes		16,161	100.00%
Democratic Party Primary Results
Democratic	Michael Conway	3,916	100.00%
Total votes		3,916	100.00%
Libertarian Party Primary Results
Libertarian	Chris A.H. Will	58	100.00%
Total votes		58	100.00%

General Election Results
Party	Candidate	Votes	%
Republican	Cecil Ash (incumbent)	16,222	34.21%
Republican	Steve Court (incumbent)	16,177	34.12%
Democratic	Michael Conway	11,568	24.40%
Libertarian	Chris A.H. Will	3,452	7.28%
Total votes		47,419	100.00%
Republican hold			
Republican hold			

=== District 19 ===
Primary Election Results
Party	Candidate	Votes	%
Republican Party Primary Results
Republican	Justin Olson	12,386	35.99%
Republican	Kirk Adams (incumbent)	12,144	35.29%
Republican	Scott Perkinson	9,881	28.71%
Total votes		34,411	100.00%
Democratic Party Primary Results
Democratic	Kit Filbey	6,463	100.00%
Total votes		6,463	100.00%

General Election Results
Party	Candidate	Votes	%
Republican	Kirk Adams (incumbent)	33,972	39.80%
Republican	Justin Olson	31,513	36.92%
Democratic	Kit Filbey	19,866	23.28%
Total votes		85,351	100.00%
Republican hold			
Republican hold			

=== District 20 ===
Primary Election Results
Party	Candidate	Votes	%
Republican Party Primary Results
Republican	Jeff Dial	13,231	48.03%
Republican	Bob Robson	10,543	38.27%
Republican	Christopher Tolino	3,775	13.70%
Total votes		27,549	100.00%
Democratic Party Primary Results
Democratic	Rae Waters (incumbent)	7,825	100.00%
Total votes		7,825	100.00%
Green Party Primary Results
Green	Drew Blischak	1	100.00%
Total votes		1	100.00%

General Election Results
Party	Candidate	Votes	%
Republican	Jeff Dial	28,680	34.58%
Republican	Bob Robson	27,662	33.35%
Democratic	Rae Waters (incumbent)	26,602	32.07%
Total votes		82,944	100.00%
Republican hold			
Republican gain from Democratic			

=== District 21 ===
Primary Election Results
Party	Candidate	Votes	%
Republican Party Primary Results
Republican	Tom Forese	13,379	35.69%
Republican	J.D. Mesnard	13,086	34.90%
Republican	Venessa Whitener	11,026	29.41%
Total votes		37,491	100.00%
Green Party Primary Results
Green	Linda J. Macías	65	100.00%
Total votes		65	100.00%

General Election Results
Party	Candidate	Votes	%
Republican	Tom Forese	42,523	42.70%
Republican	J.D. Mesnard	39,891	40.05%
Green	Linda J. Macías	17,181	17.25%
Total votes		99,595	100.00%
Republican hold			
Republican hold			

=== District 22 ===
Primary Election Results
Party	Candidate	Votes	%
Republican Party Primary Results
Republican	Eddie Farnsworth	16,727	34.54%
Republican	Steve Urie	9,935	20.51%
Republican	Laurin Hendrix (incumbent)	9,322	19.25%
Republican	Kelly Townsend	5,446	11.24%
Republican	Paul Howell	3,696	7.63%
Republican	Brett Petillo	3,308	6.83%
Total votes		48,434	100.00%
Green Party Primary Results
Green	Tim Hensley	0	-
Total votes		0	-

General Election Results
Party	Candidate	Votes	%
Republican	Eddie Farnsworth	51,533	51.76%
Republican	Steve Urie	48,031	48.24%
Total votes		99,564	100.00%
Republican hold			
Republican hold			

=== District 23 ===
Primary Election Results
Party	Candidate	Votes	%
Republican Party Primary Results
Republican	John Fillmore	10,162	50.59%
Republican	Frank Pratt (incumbent)	9,925	49.41%
Total votes		20,087	100.00%
Democratic Party Primary Results
Democratic	Barbara McGuire (incumbent)	6,676	36.22%
Democratic	Ernest Bustamante	6,570	35.65%
Democratic	Ralph Varela	5,184	28.13%
Total votes		18,430	100.00%

General Election Results
Party	Candidate	Votes	%
Republican	Frank Pratt (incumbent)	32,303	29.46%
Republican	John Fillmore	30,986	28.25%
Democratic	Barbara McGuire (incumbent)	23,679	21.59%
Democratic	Ernest Bustamante	22,698	20.70%
Total votes		109,666	100.00%
Republican hold			
Republican gain from Democratic			

=== District 24 ===
Primary Election Results
Party	Candidate	Votes	%
Democratic Party Primary Results
Democratic	Lynne Pancrazi (incumbent)	5,624	58.84%
Democratic	John Weil	3,934	41.16%
Total votes		9,558	100.00%
Republican Party Primary Results
Republican	Russ Jones (incumbent)	9,390	100.00%
Total votes		9,390	100.00%

General Election Results
Party	Candidate	Votes	%
Republican	Russ Jones (incumbent)	19,226	40.33%
Democratic	Lynne Pancrazi (incumbent)	15,298	32.09%
Democratic	John Weil	13,146	27.58%
Total votes		47,670	100.00%
Republican hold			
Democratic hold			

=== District 25 ===
Primary Election Results
Party	Candidate	Votes	%
Republican Party Primary Results
Republican	David Stevens (incumbent)	10,777	55.38%
Republican	Peggy Judd	8,684	44.62%
Total votes		19,461	100.00%
Democratic Party Primary Results
Democratic	Patricia V. Fleming (incumbent)	7,658	43.39%
Democratic	Ruben Ortega	6,343	35.94%
Democratic	Ken Davis	3,648	20.67%
Total votes		17,649	100.00%

General Election Results
Party	Candidate	Votes	%
Republican	Peggy Judd	25,405	27.70%
Republican	David Stevens (incumbent)	25,043	27.30%
Democratic	Patricia V. Fleming (incumbent)	21,359	23.29%
Democratic	Ruben Ortega	19,911	21.71%
Total votes		91,718	100.00%
Republican hold			
Republican gain from Democratic			

=== District 26 ===
Primary Election Results
Party	Candidate	Votes	%
Republican Party Primary Results
Republican	Vic Williams (incumbent)	15,584	41.45%
Republican	Terri Proud	11,902	31.66%
Republican	Wade McLean	10,110	26.89%
Total votes		37,596	100.00%
Democratic Party Primary Results
Democratic	Nancy Young Wright (incumbent)	14,264	100.00%
Total votes		14,264	100.00%

General Election Results
Party	Candidate	Votes	%
Republican	Terri Proud	40,247	34.74%
Republican	Vic Williams (incumbent)	38,180	32.95%
Democratic	Nancy Young Wright (incumbent)	37,435	32.31%
Total votes		115,862	100.00%
Republican hold			
Republican gain from Democratic			

=== District 27 ===
Primary Election Results
Party	Candidate	Votes	%
Democratic Party Primary Results
Democratic	Sally Ann Gonzales	4,126	17.19%
Democratic	Macario Saldate	3,504	14.60%
Democratic	Bob Gilby	3,054	12.72%
Democratic	John Kromko	2,946	12.27%
Democratic	Dustin Cox	2,935	12.23%
Democratic	Eric Carbajal Bustamante	2,817	11.74%
Democratic	Sami Hamed	2,345	9.77%
Democratic	John Bernal	2,277	9.49%
Total votes		24,004	100.00%
Republican Party Primary Results
Republican	Robert I. Compton	6,221	100.00%
Total votes		6,221	100.00%
Green Party Primary Results
Green	Kent Solberg	120	100.00%
Total votes		120	100.00%

General Election Results
Party	Candidate	Votes	%
Democratic	Sally Ann Gonzales	23,623	33.30%
Democratic	Macario Saldate	22,791	32.13%
Republican	Robert I. Compton	14,226	20.05%
Green	Kent Solberg	5,778	8.14%
Independent	Gene Chewning	4,526	6.38%
Total votes		70,944	100.00%
Democratic hold			
Democratic hold			

=== District 28 ===
Primary Election Results
Party	Candidate	Votes	%
Democratic Party Primary Results
Democratic	Steve Farley (incumbent)	9,353	34.96%
Democratic	Bruce Wheeler	5,719	21.37%
Democratic	Mohur Sidhwa	5,231	19.55%
Democratic	Tim Sultan	3,877	14.49%
Democratic	Ted Prezelski	2,577	9.63%
Total votes		26,757	100.00%
Republican Party Primary Results
Republican	Ken Smalley	8,287	100.00%
Republican	Greg Krino	0	0.00%
Total votes		8,287	100.00%

General Election Results
Party	Candidate	Votes	%
Democratic	Bruce Wheeler	29,073	36.98%
Democratic	Steve Farley (incumbent)	29,041	36.94%
Republican	Ken Smalley	20,508	26.08%
Total votes		78,622	100.00%
Democratic hold			
Democratic hold			

=== District 29 ===
Primary Election Results
Party	Candidate	Votes	%
Democratic Party Primary Results
Democratic	Daniel Patterson (incumbent)	6,878	51.34%
Democratic	Matt Heinz (incumbent)	6,519	48.66%
Total votes		13,397	100.00%
Republican Party Primary Results
Republican	Pat Kilburn	6,303	100.00%
Total votes		6,303	100.00%

General Election Results
Party	Candidate	Votes	%
Democratic	Daniel Patterson (incumbent)	18,326	36.73%
Democratic	Matt Heinz (incumbent)	17,227	34.53%
Republican	Pat Kilburn	14,338	28.74%
Total votes		49,891	100.00%
Democratic hold			
Democratic hold			

=== District 30 ===
Primary Election Results
Party	Candidate	Votes	%
Republican Party Primary Results
Republican	David Gowan (incumbent)	18,282	33.99%
Republican	Ted Vogt (incumbent)	15,299	28.44%
Republican	Doug Sposito	6,357	11.82%
Republican	Kurt Knurr	5,283	9.82%
Republican	Parralee Schneider	4,976	9.25%
Republican	Brian Abbott	3,591	6.68%
Total votes		53,788	100.00%
Democratic Party Primary Results
Democratic	Andrea Dalessandro	14,718	100.00%
Total votes		14,718	100.00%

General Election Results
Party	Candidate	Votes	%
Republican	David Gowan (incumbent)	49,387	37.21%
Republican	Ted Vogt (incumbent)	45,237	34.09%
Democratic	Andrea Dalessandro	38,093	28.70%
Total votes		132,717	100.00%
Republican hold			
Republican hold			

== See also ==
- 2010 United States elections
- 2010 United States Senate election in Arizona
- 2010 United States House of Representatives elections in Arizona
- 2010 Arizona elections
- 2010 Arizona gubernatorial election
- 2010 Arizona Senate election
- 50th Arizona State Legislature
- Arizona House of Representatives
