= 2008 Arizona House of Representatives election =

- November 4, 2008

All 60 seats in the Arizona House 31 seats needed for a majority
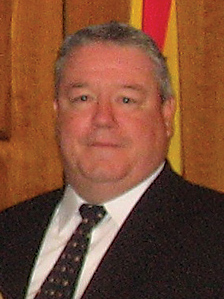

	Majority party	Minority party
Leader	Jim Weiers	Phil Lopes
Party	Republican	Democratic
Leader's seat	10th - Phoenix	27th - Tucson
Last election	33	27
Seats after	35	25
Seat change	▲2	▼2
- Results: Democratic hold Democratic gain Republican hold Republican gain
Speaker before election
Jim Weiers
Republican
Elected Speaker
Kirk Adams
Republican

The 2008 Arizona House of Representatives election took place on Tuesday, November 4, 2008, with the primary election held on Tuesday, September 2, 2008. Arizona voters elected all 60 members of the Arizona House of Representatives in multi-member districts to serve two-year terms.

The election coincided with United States national elections and Arizona state elections, including U.S. President, U.S. House, and Arizona Senate.

Following the previous election in 2006, Republicans held a 33-to-27-seat majority over Democrats. Republicans expanded their majority in 2008, winning 35 seats. At 25 members, Democrats experienced a net loss of two seats. The newly elected members served in the 49th Arizona State Legislature, during which Republican Kirk Adams was elected as Speaker of the Arizona House. (Note: Kirk Adams was elected by acclamation as Speaker for the 49th legislature.)

== Retiring Incumbents ==
=== Democrats ===
1. District 2: Albert Tom
2. District 11: David E. Funkhouser III (Note: Democratic Representative Mark DeSimone resigned his House seat on July 24, 2008. David E. Funkhouser III (D) was appointed by the Maricopa County Board of Supervisors to fill Mr. DeSimone's unexpired term as Representative of District 11 on August 20, 2008 and was sworn in on August 26, 2008.)
3. District 23: Pete Rios
4. District 25: Manuel V. "Manny" Alvarez (Note: Elected to the Arizona State Senate.)
5. District 29: Linda J. Lopez (Note: Elected to the Arizona State Senate.)

=== Republicans ===
1. District 6: Doug Clark
2. District 9: Bob Stump (Note: Elected to the Arizona Corporation Commission.)
3. District 12: John B. Nelson (Note: Elected to the Arizona State Senate.)
4. District 18: Russell K. Pearce (Note: Elected to the Arizona State Senate.)
5. District 18: Mark Anderson (Note: Ran for the U.S. House in the 5th congressional district, but was defeated in the Republican primary by David Schweikert. Schweikert went on to lose the general election to Democrat Harry Mitchell.)
6. District 20: Bob Robson (Note: Ran for the Arizona Corporation Commission, but was defeated in the Republican primary by Marian A. McClure, Bob Stump, and Barry Wong.)
7. District 22: Eddie Farnsworth (Note: Ran for the Arizona State Senate, but was defeated in the Republican primary by incumbent Thayer Verschoor.)
8. District 25: Jennifer J. Burns
9. District 26: Pete Hershberger (Note: Ran for the Arizona State Senate, but was defeated in the Republican primary by Al Melvin.)
10. District 30: Marian A. McClure (Note: Ran for the Arizona Corporation Commission, but was defeated in the general election by Republican Bob Stump and Democrats Paul Newman and Sandra Kennedy.)
11. District 30: Jonathan Paton (Note: Elected to the Arizona State Senate.)

== Incumbents Defeated in Primary Election ==
=== Democrat ===
1. District 29: Tom Prezelski

=== Republican ===
1. District 3: Trish Groe

== Incumbents Defeated in General Elections ==
=== Democrats ===
1. District 10: Jackie Thrasher
2. District 24: Theresa Ulmer

== Predictions ==
Source	Ranking	As of
Stateline	Tossup	October 15, 2008

== Summary of results ==
Italics denote an open seat held by the incumbent party; bold text denotes a gain for a party.

District	Incumbent	Party	Elected Representative	Outcome
1st	Lucy Mason	Rep	Lucy Mason	Rep Hold
1st	Andy Tobin	Rep	Andy Tobin	Rep Hold
2nd	Thomas E. "Tom" Chabin (Note: Democratic Representative Ann Kirkpatrick resigned her House seat on July 24, 2007. Thomas E. "Tom" Chabin (D) was appointed by the Coconino County Board of Supervisors to fill Ms. Kirkpatrick's unexpired term as Representative of District 2 on August 28, 2007 and was sworn in on September 10, 2007.)	Dem	Thomas E. "Tom" Chabin	Dem Hold
2nd	Albert Tom	Dem	Christopher Clark Deschene	Dem Hold
3rd	Nancy G. McLain	Rep	Nancy G. McLain	Rep Hold
3rd	Trish Groe	Rep	Doris Goodale	Rep Hold
4th	Tom Boone	Rep	Tom Boone	Rep Hold
4th	Judy M. Burges	Rep	Judy M. Burges	Rep Hold
5th	Bill Konopnicki	Rep	Bill Konopnicki	Rep Hold
5th	Jack A. Brown	Dem	Jack A. Brown	Dem Hold
6th	Sam Crump	Rep	Sam Crump (Note: Republican Representative Sam Crump resigned February 1, 2010 to campaign for a seat in the United States Congress. Amanda Reeve (R) was appointed by the Maricopa County Board of Supervisors to fill Mr. Crump's unexpired term as Representative of District 6 on February 17, 2010.)	Rep Hold
6th	Doug Clark	Rep	Carl Seel	Rep Hold
7th	Ray Barnes	Rep	Ray Barnes	Rep Hold
7th	Nancy Barto	Rep	Nancy Barto	Rep Hold
8th	Michele Reagan	Rep	Michele Reagan	Rep Hold
8th	John Kavanagh	Rep	John Kavanagh	Rep Hold
9th	Richard A. "Rick" Murphy	Rep	Richard A. "Rick" Murphy	Rep Hold
9th	Bob Stump	Rep	Debbie Lesko	Rep Hold
10th	Jim Weiers	Rep	Jim Weiers	Rep Hold
10th	Jackie Thrasher	Dem	**Doug Quelland** (Note: Republican Representative D. R. Quelland was removed from office on May 27, 2010. Kimberly Yee (R) was appointed by the Maricopa County Board of Supervisors on August 2, 2010 to fill Mr. Quelland's unexpired term.)	**Rep Gain**
11th	Adam Driggs	Rep	Adam Driggs	Rep Hold
11th	David E. Funkhouser III	Dem	Eric Meyer	Dem Hold
12th	Jerry P. Weiers	Rep	Jerry P. Weiers	Rep Hold
12th	John B. Nelson	Rep	Steve Montenegro	Rep Hold
13th	Steve Gallardo	Dem	Steve Gallardo (Note: Democratic Representative Steve Gallardo won re-election in 2008; however, he did not take the Oath of Office at the beginning of the next term in 2009. Anna Tovar (D) was appointed by the Maricopa County Board of Supervisors to fill Mr. Gallardo's unexpired term as Representative of District 13 on February 2, 2009 and was sworn in on February 3, 2009.)	Dem Hold
13th	Martha Garcia	Dem	Martha Garcia	Dem Hold
14th	Robert Meza	Dem	Robert Meza	Dem Hold
14th	Chad Campbell	Dem	Chad Campbell	Dem Hold
15th	Kyrsten Sinema	Dem	Kyrsten Sinema	Dem Hold
15th	David Lujan	Dem	David Lujan	Dem Hold
16th	Ben Miranda	Dem	Ben Miranda	Dem Hold
16th	Cloves Campbell Jr.	Dem	Cloves Campbell Jr.	Dem Hold
17th	Ed Ableser	Dem	Ed Ableser	Dem Hold
17th	David Schapira	Dem	David Schapira	Dem Hold
18th	Russell K. Pearce	Rep	Steve Court	Rep Hold
18th	Mark Anderson	Rep	Cecil Ash	Rep Hold
19th	Kirk Adams	Rep	Kirk Adams	Rep Hold
19th	Rich Crandall	Rep	Rich Crandall	Rep Hold
20th	John McComish	Rep	John McComish	Rep Hold
20th	Bob Robson	Rep	**Rae Waters**	**Dem Gain**
21st	Steve Yarbrough	Rep	Steve Yarbrough	Rep Hold
21st	Warde V. Nichols	Rep	Warde V. Nichols	Rep Hold
22nd	Andy Biggs	Rep	Andy Biggs	Rep Hold
22nd	Eddie Farnsworth	Rep	Laurin Hendrix	Rep Hold
23rd	Barbara McGuire	Dem	Barbara McGuire	Dem Hold
23rd	Pete Rios	Dem	**Frank Pratt**	**Rep Gain**
24th	Lynne Pancrazi	Dem	Lynne Pancrazi	Dem Hold
24th	Theresa Ulmer	Dem	**Russ Jones**	**Rep Gain**
25th	Manuel V. "Manny" Alvarez	Dem	Patricia "Pat" Fleming	Dem Hold
25th	Jennifer J. Burns	Rep	David Stevens	Rep Hold
26th	Nancy Young Wright (Note: Democratic Representative Lena S. Saradnik resigned her House seat on January 7, 2008. Nancy Young Wright (D) was appointed by the Pima County Board of Supervisors to fill Mrs. Saradnik's unexpired term as Representative of District 26 on January 18, 2008 and was sworn in on January 22, 2008.)	Dem	Nancy Young Wright	Dem Hold
26th	Pete Hershberger	Rep	Vic Williams	Rep Hold
27th	Phil Lopes	Dem	Phil Lopes	Dem Hold
27th	Olivia Cajero Bedford	Dem	Olivia Cajero Bedford	Dem Hold
28th	David Bradley	Dem	David Bradley	Dem Hold
28th	Steve Farley	Dem	Steve Farley	Dem Hold
29th	Linda J. Lopez	Dem	Matt Heinz	Dem Hold
29th	Tom Prezelski	Dem	Daniel Patterson	Dem Hold
30th	Marian A. McClure	Rep	David Gowan	Rep Hold
30th	Jonathan Paton	Rep	Frank Antenori (Note: Republican Representative Frank R. Antenori was appointed by the Pima County Board of Supervisors to fill Mr. Jonathan Paton's unexpired Senate term on March 2, 2010. Ted Vogt (R) was appointed by the Pima County Board of Supervisors on March 16, 2010 to fill Mr. Antenori's unexpired term.)	Rep Hold

== Detailed results ==
Sources for election results:

=== District 1 ===
Primary Election Results
Party	Candidate	Votes	%
Republican Party Primary Results
Republican	Lucy Mason (incumbent)	19,197	53.00%
Republican	Andy Tobin (incumbent)	17,023	47.00%
Total votes		36,220	100.00%
Democratic Party Primary Results
Democratic	Dennis Grittner (Note: The candidate ran a write-in campaign in this election.)	1,010	77.04%
Democratic	Ed Gogek (Note: Despite coming in second place in the Democratic primary as a write-in candidate, Ed Gogek did not advance to the general election.)	301	22.96%
Total votes		1,311	100.00%

General Election Results
Party	Candidate	Votes	%
Republican	Lucy Mason (incumbent)	55,861	38.43%
Republican	Andy Tobin (incumbent)	52,819	36.34%
Democratic	Dennis Grittner	36,669	25.23%
Total votes		145,349	100.00%
Republican hold			
Republican hold			

=== District 2 ===
Primary Election Results
Party	Candidate	Votes	%
Democratic Party Primary Results
Democratic	Christopher Clark Deschene	13,199	53.00%
Democratic	Tom Chabin (incumbent)	7,973	32.01%
Democratic	Mark Haughwout	3,649	14.65%
Democratic	Jolene Tom	85	0.34%
Total votes		24,906	100.00%

General Election Results
Party	Candidate	Votes	%
Democratic	Christopher Clark Deschene	36,724	52.51%
Democratic	Tom Chabin (incumbent)	33,211	47.49%
Total votes		69,935	100.00%
Democratic hold			
Democratic hold			

=== District 3 ===
Primary Election Results
Party	Candidate	Votes	%
Republican Party Primary Results
Republican	Nancy McLain (incumbent)	8,677	38.30%
Republican	Doris Goodale	7,587	33.48%
Republican	Trish Groe (incumbent)	6,394	28.22%
Total votes		22,658	100.00%
Democratic Party Primary Results
Democratic	Pamela Durbin	4,353	100.00%
Total votes		4,353	100.00%

General Election Results
Party	Candidate	Votes	%
Republican	Nancy McLain (incumbent)	37,815	38.32%
Republican	Doris Goodale	36,177	36.66%
Democratic	Pamela Durbin	24,698	25.03%
Total votes		98,690	100.00%
Republican hold			
Republican hold			

=== District 4 ===
Primary Election Results
Party	Candidate	Votes	%
Republican Party Primary Results
Republican	Judy M. Burges (incumbent)	19,848	51.88%
Republican	Tom Boone (incumbent)	18,407	48.12%
Total votes		38,255	100.00%
Democratic Party Primary Results
Democratic	Sue Dolphin	8,952	51.84%
Democratic	Paula S. Forster	8,317	48.16%
Total votes		17,269	100.00%

General Election Results
Party	Candidate	Votes	%
Republican	Judy M. Burges (incumbent)	70,071	31.70%
Republican	Tom Boone (incumbent)	69,590	31.48%
Democratic	Sue Dolphin	42,283	19.13%
Democratic	Paula S. Forster	39,118	17.70%
Total votes		221,062	100.00%
Republican hold			
Republican hold			

=== District 5 ===
Primary Election Results
Party	Candidate	Votes	%
Republican Party Primary Results
Republican	Bill Konopnicki (incumbent)	9,375	58.14%
Republican	Barbara G. Brewer	6,719	41.67%
Republican	Delbert D. Lambson	30	0.19%
Total votes		16,124	100.00%
Democratic Party Primary Results
Democratic	Jack A. Brown (incumbent)	12,115	99.77%
Democratic	David Rodriguez (Note: Despite coming in second place in the Democratic primary as a write-in candidate, David Rodriguez did not advance to the general election.)	28	0.23%
Total votes		12,143	100.00%

General Election Results
Party	Candidate	Votes	%
Republican	Bill Konopnicki (incumbent)	37,576	37.72%
Democratic	Jack A. Brown (incumbent)	31,966	32.08%
Republican	Barbara G. Brewer	30,089	30.20%
Total votes		99,631	100.00%
Republican hold			
Democratic hold			

=== District 6 ===
Primary Election Results
Party	Candidate	Votes	%
Republican Party Primary Results
Republican	Sam Crump (incumbent)	9,503	43.79%
Republican	Carl Seel	7,692	35.45%
Republican	Tony Bouie	4,505	20.76%
Total votes		21,700	100.00%
Democratic Party Primary Results
Democratic	Teri Conrad	4,751	53.16%
Democratic	Jack Doody	4,186	46.84%
Total votes		8,937	100.00%

General Election Results
Party	Candidate	Votes	%
Republican	Sam Crump (incumbent)	43,389	30.80%
Republican	Carl Seel	38,467	27.30%
Democratic	Jack Doody	30,139	21.39%
Democratic	Teri Conrad	28,894	20.51%
Total votes		140,889	100.00%
Republican hold			
Republican hold			

=== District 7 ===
Primary Election Results
Party	Candidate	Votes	%
Republican Party Primary Results
Republican	Nancy Barto (incumbent)	10,689	52.86%
Republican	Ray Barnes (incumbent)	9,533	47.14%
Total votes		20,222	100.00%
Democratic Party Primary Results
Democratic	Jeanne Lunn	5,396	100.00%
Total votes		5,396	100.00%
Libertarian Party Primary Results
Libertarian	James Iannuzo	58	100.00%
Total votes		58	100.00%

General Election Results
Party	Candidate	Votes	%
Republican	Nancy Barto (incumbent)	46,854	36.59%
Republican	Ray Barnes (incumbent)	40,471	31.61%
Democratic	Jeanne Lunn	31,753	24.80%
Libertarian	James Iannuzo	8,966	7.00%
Total votes		128,044	100.00%
Republican hold			
Republican hold			

=== District 8 ===
Primary Election Results
Party	Candidate	Votes	%
Republican Party Primary Results
Republican	Michele Reagan (incumbent)	15,501	51.61%
Republican	John Kavanagh (incumbent)	14,532	48.39%
Total votes		30,033	100.00%
Democratic Party Primary Results
Democratic	Stephanie Rimmer	6,817	100.00%
Total votes		6,817	100.00%

General Election Results
Party	Candidate	Votes	%
Republican	Michele Reagan (incumbent)	54,780	38.29%
Republican	John Kavanagh (incumbent)	50,507	35.30%
Democratic	Stephanie Rimmer	37,793	26.41%
Total votes		143,080	100.00%
Republican hold			
Republican hold			

=== District 9 ===
Primary Election Results
Party	Candidate	Votes	%
Republican Party Primary Results
Republican	Debbie Lesko	10,902	51.80%
Republican	Rick Murphy (incumbent)	10,143	48.20%
Total votes		21,045	100.00%
Democratic Party Primary Results
Democratic	Sheri Van Horsen	6,508	51.46%
Democratic	Shawn Hutchinson	6,139	48.54%
Total votes		12,647	100.00%

General Election Results
Party	Candidate	Votes	%
Republican	Debbie Lesko	37,762	28.87%
Republican	Rick Murphy (incumbent)	35,912	27.46%
Democratic	Sheri Van Horsen	28,683	21.93%
Democratic	Shawn Hutchinson	28,425	21.73%
Total votes		130,782	100.00%
Republican hold			
Republican hold			

=== District 10 ===
Primary Election Results
Party	Candidate	Votes	%
Republican Party Primary Results
Republican	Jim Weiers (incumbent)	6,614	51.85%
Republican	Doug Quelland	6,143	48.15%
Total votes		12,757	100.00%
Democratic Party Primary Results
Democratic	Jackie Thrasher (incumbent)	4,461	49.69%
Democratic	Lamont Lovejoy	2,453	27.32%
Democratic	Leonard Clark	2,064	22.99%
Total votes		8,978	100.00%
Libertarian Party Primary Results
Libertarian	Scott Gibson	53	100.00%
Total votes		53	100.00%
Green Party Primary Results
Green	Margarite Dale	18	100.00%
Total votes		18	100.00%

General Election Results
Party	Candidate	Votes	%
Republican	Jim Weiers (incumbent)	23,022	25.15%
Republican	Doug Quelland	22,656	24.75%
Democratic	Jackie Thrasher (incumbent)	22,103	24.14%
Democratic	Lamont Lovejoy	18,709	20.43%
Libertarian	Scott Gibson	2,707	2.96%
Green	Margarite Dale	2,358	2.58%
Total votes		91,555	100.00%
Republican hold			
Republican gain from Democratic			

=== District 11 ===
Primary Election Results
Party	Candidate	Votes	%
Republican Party Primary Results
Republican	Adam Driggs (incumbent)	11,439	51.19%
Republican	Jon Altmann	10,909	48.81%
Total votes		22,348	100.00%
Democratic Party Primary Results
Democratic	Mark Anthony DeSimone (Note: Mark Anthony DeSimone withdrew from the election on June 30, 2008 after primary ballots were already finalized.)	3,644	55.89%
Democratic	Eric Meyer	2,841	43.57%
Democratic	Jon Hulburd	35	0.54%
Total votes		6,520	100.00%

General Election Results
Party	Candidate	Votes	%
Republican	Adam Driggs (incumbent)	39,439	34.10%
Democratic	Eric Meyer	39,114	33.82%
Republican	Jon Altmann	37,110	32.08%
Total votes		115,663	100.00%
Republican hold			
Democratic hold			

=== District 12 ===
Primary Election Results
Party	Candidate	Votes	%
Republican Party Primary Results
Republican	Jerry Weiers (incumbent)	9,138	40.45%
Republican	Steve Montenegro	6,967	30.84%
Republican	Robert Blendu	6,486	28.71%
Total votes		22,591	100.00%
Democratic Party Primary Results
Democratic	Eve Nuñez	5,665	51.03%
Democratic	David Scanlon	5,436	48.97%
Total votes		11,101	100.00%
Green Party Primary Results
Green	Celeste M. Castorena	32	100.00%
Total votes		32	100.00%

General Election Results
Party	Candidate	Votes	%
Republican	Jerry Weiers (incumbent)	46,902	26.24%
Republican	Steve Montenegro	46,594	26.07%
Democratic	Eve Nuñez	40,647	22.74%
Democratic	David Scanlon	38,626	21.61%
Green	Celeste M. Castorena	5,976	3.34%
Total votes		178,745	100.00%
Republican hold			
Republican hold			

=== District 13 ===
Primary Election Results
Party	Candidate	Votes	%
Democratic Party Primary Results
Democratic	Martha Garcia (incumbent)	3,042	51.87%
Democratic	Steve Gallardo (incumbent)	2,823	48.13%
Total votes		5,865	100.00%
Republican Party Primary Results
Republican	Timothy Schwartz	1,940	100.00%
Total votes		1,940	100.00%

General Election Results
Party	Candidate	Votes	%
Democratic	Martha Garcia (incumbent)	17,627	40.25%
Democratic	Steve Gallardo (incumbent)	16,381	37.41%
Republican	Timothy Schwartz	9,785	22.34%
Total votes		43,793	100.00%
Democratic hold			
Democratic hold			

=== District 14 ===
Primary Election Results
Party	Candidate	Votes	%
Democratic Party Primary Results
Democratic	Robert Meza (incumbent)	2,765	43.54%
Democratic	Chad Campbell (incumbent)	2,544	40.06%
Democratic	John Valdez	1,042	16.41%
Total votes		6,351	100.00%

General Election Results
Party	Candidate	Votes	%
Democratic	Robert Meza (incumbent)	13,644	52.52%
Democratic	Chad Campbell (incumbent)	12,336	47.48%
Total votes		25,980	100.000%
Democratic hold			
Democratic hold			

=== District 15 ===
Primary Election Results
Party	Candidate	Votes	%
Democratic Party Primary Results
Democratic	David Lujan (incumbent)	4,860	50.79%
Democratic	Kyrsten Sinema (incumbent)	4,708	49.21%
Total votes		9,568	100.00%
Republican Party Primary Results
Republican	Ed Hedges	3,339	100.00%
Total votes		3,339	100.00%

General Election Results
Party	Candidate	Votes	%
Democratic	David Lujan (incumbent)	23,781	40.06%
Democratic	Kyrsten Sinema (incumbent)	22,721	38.28%
Republican	Ed Hedges	12,860	21.66%
Total votes		59,362	100.00%
Democratic hold			
Democratic hold			

=== District 16 ===
Primary Election Results
Party	Candidate	Votes	%
Democratic Party Primary Results
Democratic	Ben Miranda (incumbent)	3,571	31.21%
Democratic	Cloves Campbell, Jr. (incumbent)	3,155	27.58%
Democratic	Jimmie Munoz, Jr.	2,369	20.71%
Democratic	Betty Doss Ware	2,346	20.51%
Total votes		11,441	100.00%
Republican Party Primary Results
Republican	Raymond Williams	1,636	52.27%
Republican	Ronald Harders (Note: After finishing in second place in the Republican primary, Ronald Harders withdrew from the general election on 9/12/2008.)	1,494	47.73%
Total votes		3,130	100.00%

General Election Results
Party	Candidate	Votes	%
Democratic	Ben Miranda (incumbent)	28,654	43.00%
Democratic	Cloves Campbell, Jr. (incumbent)	26,247	39.39%
Republican	Raymond Williams	11,733	17.61%
Total votes		66,634	100.00%
Democratic hold			
Democratic hold			

=== District 17 ===
Primary Election Results
Party	Candidate	Votes	%
Democratic Party Primary Results
Democratic	David Schapira (incumbent)	5,657	50.60%
Democratic	Ed Ableser (incumbent)	5,523	49.40%
Total votes		11,180	100.00%
Republican Party Primary Results
Republican	Mark Thompson	6,557	57.68%
Republican	Wes Waddle	4,810	42.32%
Total votes		11,367	100.00%
Green Party Primary Results
Green	William Enzweiler (Note: Despite coming in first place in the Green primary as a write-in candidate, William Enzweiler did not advance to the general election.)	14	100.00%
Total votes		14	100.00%

General Election Results
Party	Candidate	Votes	%
Democratic	David Schapira (incumbent)	33,210	31.46%
Democratic	Ed Ableser (incumbent)	30,467	28.86%
Republican	Mark Thompson	23,437	22.20%
Republican	Wes Waddle	18,461	17.49%
Total votes		105,575	100.00%
Democratic hold			
Democratic hold			

=== District 18 ===
Primary Election Results
Party	Candidate	Votes	%
Republican Party Primary Results
Republican	Cecil Ash	6,185	38.53%
Republican	Steve Court	4,020	25.05%
Republican	Ron Middlebrook	3,911	24.37%
Republican	Kanani Henderson	1,935	12.06%
Total votes		16,051	100.00%
Democratic Party Primary Results
Democratic	Tammie Pursley	2,936	100.00%
Total votes		2,936	100.00%

General Election Results
Party	Candidate	Votes	%
Republican	Cecil Ash	21,753	31.09%
Republican	Steve Court	21,753	31.09%
Democratic	Tammie Pursley	17,844	25.50%
Independent	Joe Brown	8,617	12.32%
Total votes		69,967	100.00%
Republican hold			
Republican hold			

=== District 19 ===
Primary Election Results
Party	Candidate	Votes	%
Republican Party Primary Results
Republican	Rich Crandall (incumbent)	11,431	51.37%
Republican	Kirk Adams (incumbent)	10,820	48.63%
Total votes		22,251	100.00%
Democratic Party Primary Results
Democratic	Kathy Romano	5,424	100.00%
Total votes		5,424	100.00%
Libertarian Party Primary Results
Libertarian	Ty Lundell (Note: Despite coming in first place in the Libertarian primary as a write-in candidate, Ty Lundell did not advance to the general election.)	4	100.00%
Total votes		4	100.00%

General Election Results
Party	Candidate	Votes	%
Republican	Rich Crandall (incumbent)	44,693	38.91%
Republican	Kirk Adams (incumbent)	41,247	35.91%
Democratic	Kathy Romano	28,922	25.18%
Total votes		114,862	100.00%
Republican hold			
Republican hold			

=== District 20 ===
Primary Election Results
Party	Candidate	Votes	%
Republican Party Primary Results
Republican	Jeff Dial	6,362	29.69%
Republican	John McComish (incumbent)	5,860	27.35%
Republican	Frank Schmuck	5,725	26.72%
Republican	Andy Swann	3,482	16.25%
Total votes		21,429	100.00%
Democratic Party Primary Results
Democratic	Rae Waters	5,793	97.56%
Democratic	Michael Williams (Note: Despite coming in second place in the Democratic primary as a write-in candidate, Michael Williams did not advance to the general election.)	145	2.44%
Total votes		5,938	100.00%

General Election Results
Party	Candidate	Votes	%
Republican	John McComish (incumbent)	39,820	34.80%
Democratic	Rae Waters	37,639	32.89%
Republican	Jeff Dial	36,964	32.30%
Total votes		114,423	100.00%
Republican hold			
Democratic gain from Republican			

=== District 21 ===
Primary Election Results
Party	Candidate	Votes	%
Republican Party Primary Results
Republican	Steve Yarbrough (incumbent)	12,920	53.81%
Republican	Warde V. Nichols (incumbent)	11,090	46.19%
Total votes		24,010	100.00%
Democratic Party Primary Results
Democratic	Phil Hettmansperger	6,305	100.00%
Total votes		6,305	100.00%

General Election Results
Party	Candidate	Votes	%
Republican	Steve Yarbrough (incumbent)	56,980	38.40%
Republican	Warde V. Nichols (incumbent)	46,478	31.32%
Democratic	Phil Hettmansperger	44,943	30.28%
Total votes		148,401	100.00%
Republican hold			
Republican hold			

=== District 22 ===
Primary Election Results
Party	Candidate	Votes	%
Republican Party Primary Results
Republican	Andy Biggs (incumbent)	9,800	34.16%
Republican	Laurin Hendrix	7,499	26.14%
Republican	Bob Brown	5,926	20.66%
Republican	Adam Armer	5,464	19.05%
Total votes		28,689	100.00%
Democratic Party Primary Results
Democratic	Glenn Ray	5,586	100.00%
Total votes		5,586	100.00%

General Election Results
Party	Candidate	Votes	%
Republican	Andy Biggs (incumbent)	59,615	37.57%
Republican	Laurin Hendrix	56,885	35.85%
Democratic	Glenn Ray	42,191	26.59%
Total votes		158,691	100.00%
Republican hold			
Republican hold			

=== District 23 ===
Primary Election Results
Party	Candidate	Votes	%
Democratic Party Primary Results
Democratic	Barbara McGuire (incumbent)	6,417	34.39%
Democratic	Ernest Bustamante	5,756	30.85%
Democratic	Krista Pacion	4,510	24.17%
Democratic	Dorian Bond	1,916	10.27%
Democratic	Emily Verdugo-Aldrich	59	0.32%
Total votes		18,658	100.00%
Republican Party Primary Results
Republican	Frank Pratt	5,839	50.11%
Republican	John Fillmore	5,813	49.89%
Total votes		11,652	100.00%

General Election Results
Party	Candidate	Votes	%
Democratic	Barbara McGuire (incumbent)	37,982	25.82%
Republican	Frank Pratt	36,804	25.02%
Republican	John Fillmore	36,203	24.61%
Democratic	Ernest Bustamante	36,118	24.55%
Total votes		147,107	100.00%
Democratic hold			
Republican gain from Democratic			

=== District 24 ===
Primary Election Results
Party	Candidate	Votes	%
Democratic Party Primary Results
Democratic	Lynne Pancrazi (incumbent)	5,295	53.91%
Democratic	Theresa Ulmer (incumbent)	4,527	46.09%
Total votes		9,822	100.00%
Republican Party Primary Results
Republican	Russ Jones	5,704	100.00%
Total votes		5,704	100.00%

General Election Results
Party	Candidate	Votes	%
Democratic	Lynne Pancrazi (incumbent)	22,680	36.20%
Republican	Russ Jones	21,197	33.84%
Democratic	Theresa Ulmer (incumbent)	18,767	29.96%
Total votes		62,644	100.00%
Democratic hold			
Republican gain from Democratic			

=== District 25 ===
Primary Election Results
Party	Candidate	Votes	%
Democratic Party Primary Results
Democratic	Patricia "Pat" Fleming	9,153	57.39%
Democratic	Richard "Ric" Boyer	6,797	42.61%
Total votes		15,950	100.00%
Republican Party Primary Results
Republican	David Stevens	7,010	57.93%
Republican	Timathy Davies	5,090	42.07%
Total votes		12,100	100.00%

General Election Results
Party	Candidate	Votes	%
Democratic	Patricia "Pat" Fleming	32,749	28.93%
Republican	David Stevens	28,806	25.45%
Democratic	Richard "Ric" Boyer	27,857	24.61%
Republican	Timathy Davies	23,778	21.01%
Total votes		113,190	100.00%
Democratic hold			
Republican hold			

=== District 26 ===
Primary Election Results
Party	Candidate	Votes	%
Republican Party Primary Results
Republican	Vic Williams	10,737	36.40%
Republican	Marilyn Zerull	9,405	31.88%
Republican	Trent Humphries	9,355	31.72%
Total votes		29,497	100.00%
Democratic Party Primary Results
Democratic	Nancy Young Wright (incumbent)	10,621	54.18%
Democratic	Donald Jorgensen	8,981	45.82%
Total votes		19,602	100.00%

General Election Results
Party	Candidate	Votes	%
Republican	Vic Williams	44,857	26.05%
Democratic	Nancy Young Wright (incumbent)	44,448	25.82%
Republican	Marilyn Zerull	43,600	25.32%
Democratic	Donald Jorgensen	39,268	22.81%
Total votes		172,173	100.00%
Republican hold			
Democratic hold			

=== District 27 ===
Primary Election Results
Party	Candidate	Votes	%
Democratic Party Primary Results
Democratic	Olivia Cajero Bedford (incumbent)	7,357	41.06%
Democratic	Phil Lopes (incumbent)	6,593	36.80%
Democratic	John Kromko	3,967	22.14%
Total votes		17,917	100.00%
Republican Party Primary Results
Republican	J. D. "Duke" Schechter	3,698	100.00%
Total votes		3,698	100.00%
Libertarian Party Primary Results
Libertarian	Mark Phelps	10	100.00%
Total votes		10	100.00%
Green Party Primary Results
Green	Kent Solberg	94	100.00%
Total votes		94	100.00%

General Election Results
Party	Candidate	Votes	%
Democratic	Olivia Cajero Bedford (incumbent)	35,010	37.05%
Democratic	Phil Lopes (incumbent)	32,650	34.55%
Republican	J. D. "Duke" Schechter	15,490	16.39%
Libertarian	Mark Phelps	6,374	6.75%
Green	Kent Solberg	4,970	5.26%
Total votes		94,494	100.00%
Democratic hold			
Democratic hold			

=== District 28 ===
Primary Election Results
Party	Candidate	Votes	%
Democratic Party Primary Results
Democratic	Steve Farley (incumbent)	10,213	51.63%
Democratic	David Bradley (incumbent)	9,568	48.37%
Total votes		19,781	100.00%

General Election Results
Party	Candidate	Votes	%
Democratic	Steve Farley (incumbent)	44,121	50.16%
Democratic	David Bradley (incumbent)	43,845	49.84%
Total votes		87,966	100.00%
Democratic hold			
Democratic hold			

=== District 29 ===
Primary Election Results
Party	Candidate	Votes	%
Democratic Party Primary Results
Democratic	Matt Heinz	3,771	25.41%
Democratic	Daniel Patterson	2,572	17.33%
Democratic	Tom Prezelski (incumbent)	2,348	15.82%
Democratic	Eric Carbajal Bustamante	1,862	12.54%
Democratic	Patricia Puig	1,793	12.08%
Democratic	Ephraim Cruz	1,512	10.19%
Democratic	Gil Guerra	985	6.64%
Total votes		14,843	100.00%
Republican Party Primary Results
Republican	Pat Kilburn	3,824	64.10%
Republican	Juan Ciscomani	2,142	35.90%
Total votes		5,966	100.00%

General Election Results
Party	Candidate	Votes	%
Democratic	Daniel Patterson	25,684	32.98%
Democratic	Matt Heinz	24,898	31.97%
Republican	Pat Kilburn	15,344	19.70%
Republican	Juan Ciscomani	11,960	15.36%
Total votes		77,886	100.00%
Democratic hold			
Democratic hold			

=== District 30 ===
Primary Election Results
Party	Candidate	Votes	%
Republican Party Primary Results
Republican	David Gowan	11,163	31.68%
Republican	Frank Antenori	8,427	23.92%
Republican	Doug Sposito	7,953	22.57%
Republican	Sharon Collins	7,689	21.82%
Total votes		35,232	100.00%
Democratic Party Primary Results
Democratic	Andrea Dalessandro	11,871	100.00%
Total votes		11,871	100.00%

General Election Results
Party	Candidate	Votes	%
Republican	David Gowan	54,986	34.75%
Republican	Frank Antenori	54,262	34.30%
Democratic	Andrea Dalessandro	48,966	30.95%
Total votes		158,214	100.00%
Republican hold			
Republican hold			

== See also ==
- 2008 United States elections
- 2008 United States presidential election in Arizona
- 2008 United States House of Representatives elections in Arizona
- 2008 Arizona Senate election
- 49th Arizona State Legislature
- Arizona House of Representatives
