= 49th Arizona State Legislature =

Session of the Arizona Legislature

←	48th	50th	→
- Arizona State Capitol (2014)

Overview
- Legislative body: Arizona State Legislature
- Jurisdiction: Arizona, United States
- Term: January 1, 2009 – December 31, 2010

Senate
- Members: 30
- President: Robert Burns
- Temporary President: Thayer Verschoor
- Party control: Republican (18–12)

House of Representatives
- Members: 60
- Speaker: Kirk Adams
- Party control: Republican (35–25)

Sessions
- 1st: January 12 – July 12, 2009
- 2nd: January 11 – April 29, 2010

Special sessions
- 1st: January 28 – January 31, 2009
- 2nd: May 21 – May 27, 2009
- 3rd: July 6 – August 25, 2009
- 4th: November 17 – November 23, 2009
- 5th: December 17 – December 19, 2009
- 6th: February 1 – February 11, 2010
- 7th: March 8 – March 16, 2010
- 8th: March 29 – April 1, 2010
- 9th: August 9 – August 11, 2010

The 49th Arizona State Legislature, consisting of the Arizona State Senate and the Arizona House of Representatives, was constituted in Phoenix from January 1, 2009, to December 31, 2010, during the final month of Janet Napolitano's second term in office, prior to her resignation to become United States Secretary of Homeland Security, and the first two years of her successor, Jan Brewer. Both the Senate and the House membership remained constant at 30 and 60, respectively. The Republicans gained a seat in the Senate, increasing the majority to 18–12. The Republicans also gained two seats in the lower chamber, giving them a 35–25 majority.

== Sessions ==
The Legislature met for two regular sessions at the State Capitol in Phoenix. The first opened on January 12, 2009, and adjourned on July 12, while the Second Regular Session convened on January 11, 2010, and adjourned sine die on April 29.

There were nine Special Sessions, the first of which was convened on January 28, 2009, and adjourned on January 31; the second convened on May 21, 2009, and adjourned sine die on May 27; the third convened on July 6, 2009, and adjourned sine die August 25; the fourth convened on November 17, 2009, and adjourned sine die on November 23; the fifth convened on December 17, 2009, and adjourned sine die December 19; the sixth special session convened on February 1, 2010, and adjourned sine die on February 11; the seventh special session convened on March 8, 2010, and convened sine die on March 16; the eighth special session convened on March 29, 2010, and adjourned sine die on April 1; and the ninth and final special convened on August 9, 2010, and adjourned sine die on August 11.

== State Senate ==
=== Members ===
The asterisk (*) denotes members of the previous Legislature who continued in office as members of this Legislature.

District	Senator	Party	Notes
1	Steve Pierce	Republican	
2	Albert Hale*	Democrat	
3	Ron Gould*	Republican	
4	Jack W. Harper*	Republican	
5	Sylvia Allen	Republican	
6	Pamela Gorman*	Republican	
7	Jim Waring*	Republican	
8	Carolyn S. Allen*	Republican	
9	Robert Burns*	Republican	
10	Linda Gray	Republican	
11	Barbara Leff*	Republican	
12	John Nelson	Republican	
13	Richard Miranda*	Democrat	
14	Debbie McCune Davis*	Democrat	
15	Ken Cheuvront*	Democrat	
16	Leah Landrum Taylor*	Democrat	
17	Meg Burton Cahill*	Democrat	
18	Russell Pearce	Republican	
19	Chuck Gray*	Republican	
20	John Huppenthal*	Republican	
21	Jay Tibshraeny*	Republican	
22	Thayer Verschoor*	Republican	
23	Rebecca Rios*	Democrat	
24	Amanda Aguirre*	Democrat	
25	Manuel Alvarez	Democrat	
26	Al Melvin	Republican	
27	Jorge Luis Garcia*	Democrat	
28	Paula Aboud*	Democrat	
29	Linda Lopez	Democrat	
30	Jonathan Paton	Republican	

== House of Representatives ==
=== Members ===
The asterisk (*) denotes members of the previous Legislature who continued in office as members of this Legislature.

District	Representative	Party	Notes
1	Lucy Mason*	Republican	
1	Andy Tobin*	Republican	
2	Thomas Chabin*	Democrat	
2	Christopher Deschene	Democrat	
3	Doris Goodale	Republican	
3	Nancy McLain*	Republican	
4	Tom Boone*	Republican	
4	Judy Burges*	Republican	
5	Jack A. Brown*	Democrat	
5	Bill Konopnicki*	Republican	
6	Sam Crump*	Republican	Resigned in January 2010 in order to run for U.S. House of Representatives, replaced by Amanda Reeve
6	Carl Seel	Republican	
7	Ray Barnes*	Republican	
7	Nancy Barto*	Republican	
8	John Kavanagh*	Republican	
8	Michelle Reagan*	Republican	
9	Debbie Lesko	Republican	
9	Rick Murphy*	Republican	
10	Doug Quelland	Democrat	
10	James Weiers	Republican	
11	Adam Driggs*	Republican	
11	Eric Meyer	Democrat	
12	Steve Montenegro	Republican	
12	Jerry Weiers*	Republican	
13	Martha Garcia*	Democrat	
13	Anna Tovar	Democrat	Was appointed on February 3, 2009, to replace Steve Gallardo, who won the election, but did not take the oath of office.
14	Chad Campbell*	Democrat	
14	Robert Meza*	Democrat	
15	David Lujan*	Democrat	
15	Kyrsten Sinema*	Democrat	
16	Cloves Campbell Jr.*	Democrat	
16	Ben R. Miranda*	Democrat	
17	Ed Ableser*	Democrat	
17	David Schapira*	Democrat	
18	Cecil Ash	Republican	
18	Steve Court	Republican	
19	Kirk Adams*	Republican	
19	Rich Crandall*	Republican	
20	John McComish*	Republican	
20	Rae Waters	Democrat	
21	Warde Nichols*	Republican	
21	Steven B. Yarbrough*	Republican	
22	Andy Biggs*	Republican	
22	Laurin Hendrix	Republican	
23	Barbara McGuire*	Democrat	
23	Franklin Pratt	Republican	
24	Russell Jones	Republican	
24	Lynne Pancrazi*	Democrat	
25	Patricia Fleming	Democrat	
25	David Stevens	Republican	
26	Vic Williams	Republican	
26	Nancy Young Wright	Democrat	
27	Olivia Cajero Bedford*	Democrat	
27	Phil Lopes*	Democrat	
28	David T. Bradley*	Democrat	
28	Steve Farley*	Democrat	
29	Matt Heinz	Democrat	
29	Daniel Patterson	Democrat	
30	Frank Antenori	Republican	
30	David Gowan Sr.	Republican	
