= 50th Arizona State Legislature =

Session of the Arizona Legislature

←	49th	51st	→
- Arizona State Capitol (2014)

Overview
- Legislative body: Arizona State Legislature
- Jurisdiction: Arizona, United States
- Term: January 1, 2011 – December 31, 2012

Senate
- Members: 30
- President: Russell Pearce (through November 9, 2011); Steve Pierce (effective November 10, 2011)
- Temporary President: Sylvia Allen
- Party control: Republican (21–9)

House of Representatives
- Members: 60
- Speaker: Kirk Adams (through April 28, 2011); Andy Tobin (effective April 28, 2011)
- Party control: Republican (40–20)

Sessions
- 1st: January 10 – April 20, 2011
- 2nd: January 9 – May 3, 2012

Special sessions
- 1st: January 19 – January 20, 2011
- 2nd: February 14 – February 16, 2011
- 3rd: February 14 – February 16, 2011
- 4th: November 11 – November 11, 2011

The 50th Arizona State Legislature, consisting of the Arizona State Senate and the Arizona House of Representatives, was constituted in Phoenix from January 1, 2011, to December 31, 2012, during the first two years of Jan Brewer's first full term in office. Both the Senate and the House membership remained constant at 30 and 60, respectively. The Republicans gained three seats in the Senate, increasing their majority to 21–9. The Republicans also gained five seats in the lower chamber, giving them a 40–20 majority.

== Sessions ==
The Legislature met for two regular sessions at the State Capitol in Phoenix. The first opened on January 10, 2011, and adjourned on April 20, while the Second Regular Session convened on January 9, 2012, and adjourned sine die on May 3.

There were four Special Sessions, the first of which was convened on January 19, 2011, and adjourned on January 20; the second convened on February 14, 2011, and adjourned sine die on February 16; the third convened on February 14, 2011, and adjourned sine die February 16; and the fourth convened on November 11, 2011, and adjourned sine die later that same day.

== State Senate ==
=== Members ===
The asterisk (*) denotes members of the previous Legislature who continued in office as members of this Legislature.

District	Senator	Party	Notes
1	Steve Pierce*	Republican	
2	Jack Jackson Jr.	Democrat	
3	Ron Gould*	Republican	
4	Scott Bundgaard	Republican	
5	Sylvia Allen*	Republican	
6	Lori Klein	Republican	
7	Nancy Barto	Republican	
8	Michele Reagan	Republican	
9	Rick Murphy	Republican	
10	Linda Gray*	Republican	
11	Adam Driggs	Republican	
12	John Nelson*	Republican	
13	Steve Gallardo	Democrat	
14	Robert Meza	Democrat	
15	Kyrsten Sinema	Democrat	
16	Leah Landrum Taylor*	Democrat	
17	David Schapira	Democrat	
18	Russell Pearce	Republican	Removed from office through a special election on November 8, 2011
18	Jerry Lewis	Republican	Won special election on November 8, 2011
19	Rich Crandall	Republican	
20	John McComish	Republican	
21	Steve Yarbrough	Republican	
22	Andy Biggs	Republican	
23	Steve Smith	Republican	
24	Don Shooter	Republican	
25	Gail Griffin	Republican	
26	Al Melvin*	Republican	
27	Olivia Cajero Bedford	Democrat	
28	Paula Aboud*	Democrat	
29	Linda Lopez*	Democrat	
30	Frank Antenori	Republican	

== House of Representatives ==
=== Members ===
The asterisk (*) denotes members of the previous Legislature who continued in office as members of this Legislature.

District	Representative	Party	Notes
1	Karen Fann	Republican	
1	Andy Tobin*	Republican	
2	Thomas Chabin*	Democrat	
2	Albert Hale	Democrat	
3	Doris Goodale*	Republican	
3	Nancy McLain*	Republican	
4	Judy Burges*	Republican	
4	Jack Harper	Republican	
5	Brenda Barton	Republican	
5	Chester Crandell	Republican	
6	Amanda Reeve	Republican	
6	Carl Seel*	Republican	
7	Heather Carter	Republican	
7	David Burnell Smith	Republican	
8	John Kavanagh*	Republican	
8	Michelle Ugenti	Republican	
9	Rick Gray	Republican	
9	Debbie Lesko*	Republican	
10	James Weiers	Republican	
10	Kimberly Yee	Republican	
11	Kate Brophy McGee	Republican	
11	Eric Meyer*	Democrat	
12	Steve Montenegro*	Republican	
12	Jerry Weiers*	Republican	
13	Richard Miranda	Democrat	
13	Anna Tovar*	Democrat	
14	Chad Campbell*	Democrat	
14	Debbie McCune Davis	Democrat	
15	Lela Alston	Democrat	
15	Katie Hobbs	Democrat	
16	Ruben Gallego	Democrat	
16	Catherine H. Miranda	Democrat	
17	Ed Ableser*	Democrat	
17	P. Ben Arredondo	Democrat	
18	Cecil Ash*	Republican	
18	Steve Court*	Republican	
19	Kirk Adams*	Republican	Resigned on April 28, 2011
19	Justin Olson	Republican	
19	Justin Pierce	Republican	Appointed May 23, 2011 to replace Adams
20	Jeff Dial	Republican	
20	Bob Robson	Republican	
21	Tom Forese	Republican	
21	Javan D. Mesnard	Republican	
22	Edwin W. Farnsworth	Republican	
22	Steve R. Urie	Republican	
23	John Fillmore	Republican	
23	Franklin Pratt	Republican	
24	Russell Jones*	Republican	
24	Lynne Pancrazi*	Democrat	
25	Peggy Judd	Republican	
25	David Stevens*	Republican	
26	Terri Proud	Republican	
26	Vic Williams*	Republican	
27	Sally Ann Trujillo Gonzales	Democrat	
27	Macario Saldate IV	Democrat	
28	Steve Farley*	Democrat	
28	Bruce Wheeler	Democrat	
29	Matt Heinz*	Democrat	
29	Daniel Patterson*	Democrat	
30	David Gowan Sr.*	Republican	
30	Janson T. "Ted" Vogt	Republican	
