= Jackie Thrasher =

American politician

Member of the Arizona House of Representatives from the 3rd district
- In office January 2005 – January 2009
- Preceded by: Doug Quelland
- Succeeded by: Doug Quelland

Personal details
- Born: September 23, 1957 (age 68) Detroit, Michigan
- Party: Democratic
- Spouse: John
- Children: Jason, Jessica
- Profession: Politician

Jackie Thrasher (born September 23, 1957) was a member of the Arizona house of representatives from 2007 to 2009. She was elected to the house in November 2006. In 2008, she ran for re-election, winning the Democratic primary, while losing in the general election to the fellow incumbents James Weiers and Doug Quelland. She attempted to regain her seat in 2010, winning the Democratic primary, but losing in the general election to Jim Weiers and Kimberly Yee. After redistricting, in 2012 she attempted to return to the house in District 20, winning the Democratic primary, but losing to Paul Boyer and Carl Seel.
