= Bob Robson (politician) =

American politician

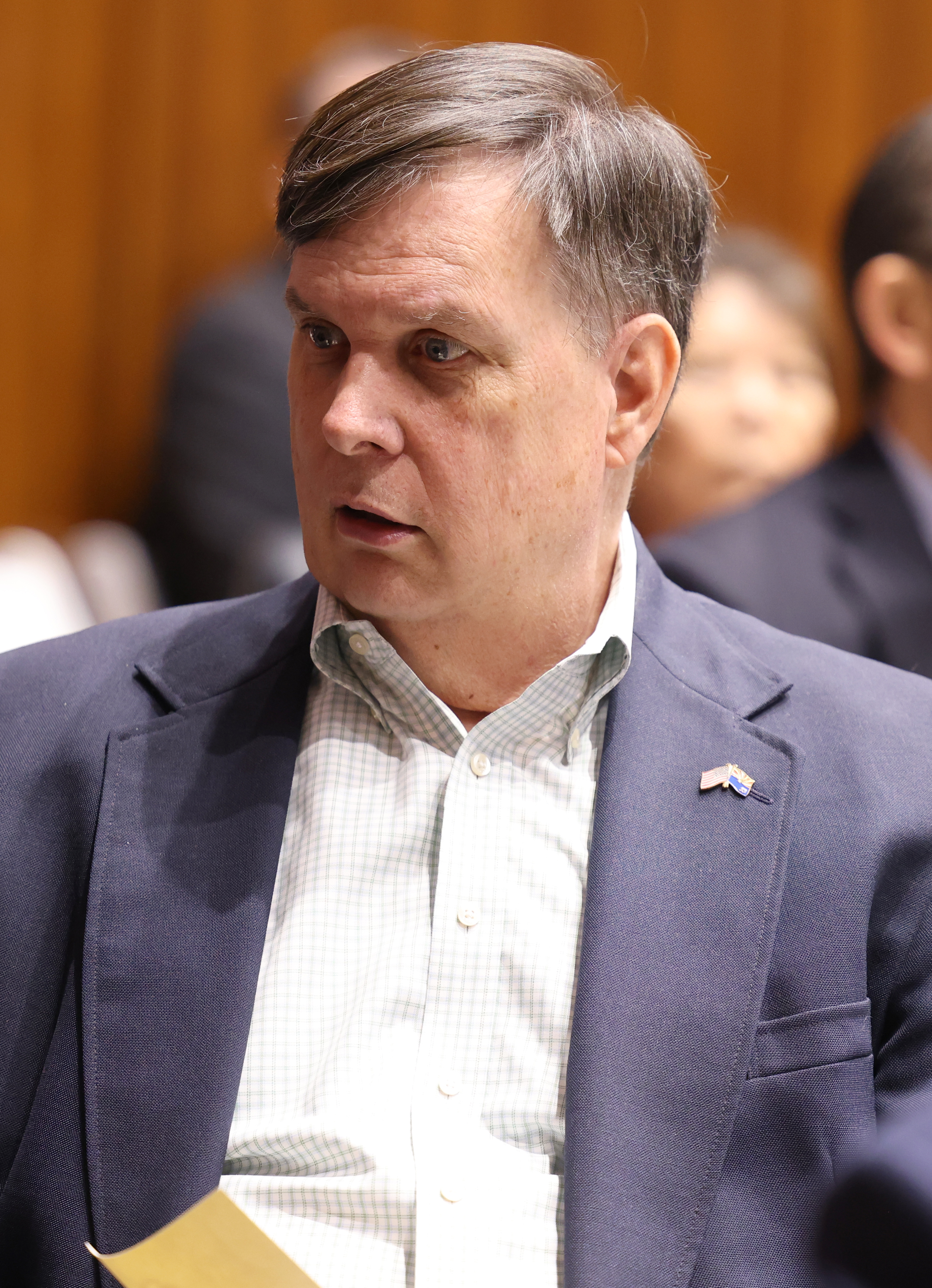
- Robson in 2025

Member of the Arizona House of Representatives from the 18th district
- In office January 14, 2013 – January 9, 2017 Serving with Jill Norgaard (2015–2017); Jeff Dial (2013–2015)
- Succeeded by: Denise Epstein

Member of the Arizona House of Representatives from the 20th district
- In office January 10, 2011 – January 14, 2013 Serving with Jeff Dial
- Preceded by: Rae Waters

Member of the Arizona House of Representatives from the 20th district
- In office January 2003 – January 2009 Serving with John McComish (2005–2009); John Huppenthal (2003–2005)
- Succeeded by: Rae Waters

Member of the Arizona House of Representatives from the 6th district
- In office January 2001 – January 2003 Serving with John Huppenthal

Personal details
- Party: Republican
- Education: John Jay College of Criminal Justice
- Website: bobrobson2014.comdefunct

Bob Robson is an American politician and a former Republican member of the Arizona House of Representatives representing District 18. Robson previously served consecutively from January 10, 2011, until January 14, 2013, in the District 20 seat, and non-consecutively from January 2001 until January 2009 in the District 6 and District 20 seats.

== Education ==
Robson earned his BS and MS in criminal justice from John Jay College of Criminal Justice.

== Elections ==
- 2014 Robson successfully ran for reelection alongside Jill Norgaard. Robson came in second, narrowly defeating Democratic challenger Denise "Mitzi" Epstein in the general election with 31,587 votes.
- 2012 Redistricted to District 18, and with incumbent Republican Representatives Cecil Ash and Steve Court leaving the Legislature, Dial and Robson were unopposed in the August 28, 2012, Republican primary; Dial placed first, and Robson placed second with 14,780 votes; Dial and Robson won the five-way November 6, 2012, general election, with Dial taking the first seat and Robson taking the second seat with 44,204 votes against Democratic nominees Corey Harris, Darin Fisher, and Independent candidate Brent Fine.
- 2000 With District 6 incumbent Republican Representatives Lori Daniels running for Arizona Senate and Richard Kyle leaving the Legislature, Robson ran in the four-way September 12, 2000, Republican primary, placing second with 5,130 votes, and took the second seat in the November 7, 2000, general election with 31,328 votes against Democratic nominee Richard Wenzel.
- 2002 Redistricted to District 20, Robson ran in the four-way September 10, 2002, Republican primary, placing second with 4,278 votes, and won the second seat in the three-way November 5, 2002, general election with 20,794 votes against Democratic nominee Jim Torgeson.
- 2004 With fellow Republican Representative John Huppenthal running for Arizona Senate, Robson ran in the five-way September 7, 2004, Republican primary, placing first with 6,801 votes; John McComish (who had been a primary candidate in 2002) won the first seat, and Robson won the second seat in the four-way November 2, 2004, general election with 37,334 votes above Democratic nominee Jim Torgeson and Libertarian candidate Joel Beckwith.
- 2006 Robson and McComish were unopposed for the September 12, 2006, Republican primary; Robson placed first with 6,221 votes, and in the November 7, 2006, general election, McComish took the first seat and Robson took the second seat with 26,963 votes against Libertarian candidate Jack Heald.
- 2008 Running for one of the three seats up for election on the Arizona Corporation Commission, Robson ran in the eight-way September 2, 2008, Republican primary, placing sixth behind Bob Stump, former state Representative Marian McClure, and Barry Wong; in the November 4, 2008, general election, Democratic former state Senator Sandra Kennedy placed first, Democratic former state Representative Paul Newman placed second, and Stump took the third seat.
- 2010 Robson challenged incumbent Democratic Representative Rae Waters to regain the District 20 seat, and ran alongside incumbent Representative Jeff Dial in the three-way August 24, 2010, Republican primary, placing second behind Dial with 10,543 votes; in the three-way November 2, 2010, general election, Dial took the first seat, and Robson took the second seat with 27,662 votes against Representative Waters.
