= Mark Anderson (Arizona politician) =

American politician (born 1954)

Member of the Arizona Senate from the 18th district
- In office January 2003 – January 2005
- Succeeded by: Karen Johnson

Member of the Arizona House of Representatives from the 29th district
- In office January 1995 – January 2003
- Preceded by: Pat Blake; Lela Steffey

Member of the Arizona House of Representatives from the 18th district
- In office January 2005 – January 2009
- Preceded by: Karen Johnson
- Succeeded by: Cecil Ash; Steve Court

Personal details
- Born: November 23, 1954 (age 71) Reserve, New Mexico, U.S.
- Party: Republican
- Spouse: Lucia
- Children: Kendra, Nedd, and Ethan
- Profession: Politician

Mark Anderson (born November 23, 1954) was a member of the Arizona House of Representatives and the Arizona Senate, serving two stretches in the House and a single term in the Senate. He was first elected to the House representing District 29 in November 1994, and was re-elected three times, in 1996, 1998, and 2000. Due to Arizona's term limit policy, Anderson could not run for the House again in 2002, so instead ran for the Senate. Due to redistricting, he ran in the new 18th District, and won the Senate seat, where he served from 2003 to 2005. In 2004 he again ran for the House, winning the seat from the 18th District. He won re-election in 2006.
