= Theresa Ulmer =

American politician (born 1962)

Member of the Arizona House of Representatives from the 24th district
- In office January 2007 – January 2009
- Preceded by: Amanda Aguirre; Russell Jones
- Succeeded by: Russell Jones

Personal details
- Born: February 26, 1962 (age 64) York, Nebraska
- Party: Democratic
- Children: Eli, Henley
- Profession: Politician

Theresa Ulmer (born February 26, 1962) was a member of the Arizona House of Representatives for a single term. She represented the 24th District during the 48th Legislature, winning the November 2006 election. She lost to Russell Jones during the general election during her unsuccessful re-election bid in 2008.
