= Tom Prezelski =

American politician

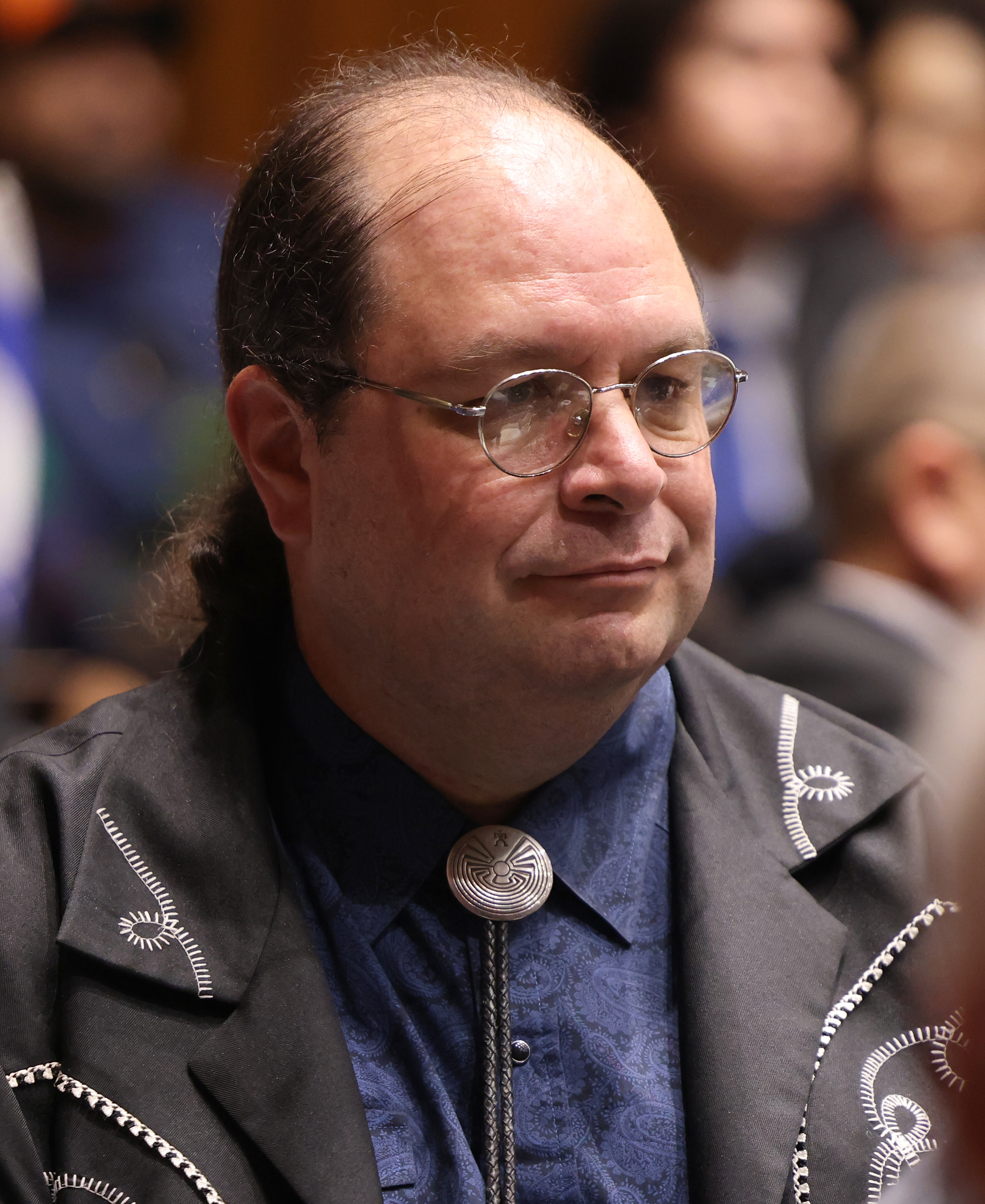

Member of the Arizona House of Representatives from the 29th district
- In office February 2003 – January 2009
- Preceded by: Victor Soltero
- Succeeded by: Matt Heinz; Daniel Patterson

Personal details
- Party: Democratic
- Profession: Politician

Tom Prezelski (born 12 January 1970) is an American author, and was a member of the Arizona House of Representatives, representing the 29th District. He was first appointed to the legislature by the Pima County Board of Supervisors on February 11, 2003, to fill the vacancy created by the resignation of Victor Soltero. Soltero resigned on January 23 when he was appointed by the same Board of Supervisors to fill the vacancy in the State Senate when Ramón Valadez did not take the Oath of Office. He won re-election in 2004 and 2006. In his 2008 re-election bid, he came in third in the Democratic primary, behind eventual winners of the general election Matt Heinz and Daniel Patterson.

He received an honorable mention for his book, Californio Lancers: The 1st Battalion of Native Cavalry in the Far West, 1863-1866 at the 2016 International Latino Book Awards.
