= Carl Seel =

American politician

Member of the Arizona House of Representatives from the 20th district
- In office January 14, 2013 – January 5, 2015 Serving with Paul Boyer
- Succeeded by: Anthony Kern

Member of the Arizona House of Representatives from the 6th district
- In office January 2009 – January 14, 2013 Serving with Sam Crump (2009–2011); Amanda Reeve (2011–2013)

Personal details
- Born: July 14, 1969 (age 57) Maryland
- Party: Republican
- Education: College of the Canyons

Carl E. Seel (born July 14, 1969, in Maryland) is an American politician and a former Republican member of the Arizona House of Representatives representing District 20 from 2013 to 2015. Seel served consecutively from January 2009 until January 14, 2013, in the District 6 seat.

== Education ==
Seel earned his AA from College of the Canyons in California.

== Elections ==
- 2012 Redistricted to District 20, and with incumbent Republican Representatives Jeff Dial and Bob Robson redistricted to District 18, and with incumbent Republican Representative David Gowan redistricted from District 30, Seel ran in the August 28, 2012 Republican Primary, placing second with 8,990 votes; in the four-way November 6, 2012 General election, Paul Boyer took the first seat and Seel took the second seat with 32,865 votes ahead of Democratic nominees former Representative Jackie Thrasher and Tonya Norwood.
- 2004 With four open seats on the Arizona Corporation Commission, Seel ran for the two-year seat opening in the September 7, 2004 Republican Primary, but lost to Kristin Mayes; Mayes won the November 2, 2004 General election against Libertarian candidate Rick Fowlkes. Mayes was re-elected in 2006 and served from 2005 until 2011.
- 2006 With District 6 incumbent Republican Representatives Pamela Gorman and Ted Carpenter both running for Arizona Senate and leaving both District 6 seats open, Seel ran in the four-way September 12, 2006 Republican Primary, but lost to Doug Clark and Sam Crump; Clark and Crump were unopposed in the November 2, 2010 General election.
- 2008 With Representative Clark leaving the Legislature and leaving a District 6 seat open, Seel ran in the three-way September 2, 2008 Republican Primary; Representative Crump placed first and Seel placed second with 7,692 votes; in the November 2, 2008 General election, Representative Crump took the first seat, and Seel took the second seat with 38,467 votes ahead of Democratic nominees Jack Doody and Teri Conrad.
- 2010 With Representative Crump leaving the Legislature and leaving a District 6 seat open, Seel ran in the seven-way August 24, 2010 Republican Primary and placed second with 7,298 votes; in the four-way November 2, 2010 General election, fellow Republican nominee Amanda Reeve took the first seat, and Seel took the second seat with 31,518 votes, ahead of Democratic nominee Teri Conrad and Green candidate Deborah O'Dowd.
