= Pat Fleming (politician) =

American politician (born 1939)

Member of the Arizona House of Representatives from the 25th district
- In office 2009–2011
- Preceded by: Manuel Alvarez; Jennifer Burns
- Succeeded by: Peggy Judd

Personal details
- Born: March 10, 1949 (age 77) Mexico, Missouri
- Party: Democratic
- Education: University of Phoenix

Patricia 'Pat' V. Fleming (born March 10, 1949, in Mexico, Missouri) is an American politician and a former Democratic member of the Arizona House of Representatives for District 25. She lives in Sierra Vista, Arizona. The seat was previously held by a Republican, Jennifer Burns, who did not seek re-election. Fleming was previously a member of the Arizona Democratic Party State Committee and was selected to chair the Cochise County Democratic Party in 2006. Before her entrance into politics, she worked for the US Army as a budget analyst and a manpower allocations analyst. She retired in August 2005 with over 24 years of service.

== Personal life ==
Fleming was born in Missouri, near her grandparents' farm. Her father was a career Army officer and her mother was an Army civilian. In 1969 she moved with her family to Sierra Vista, and in 1981 she began working with the Army at Fort Huachuca. She has a degree from the University of Phoenix in Business Management. Fleming is married to her husband Bob and has five children and 12 grandchildren.

== Politics ==
Fleming first got involved in local politics in 2000 and has held positions with the Arizona Democratic Party, the Chochise County Democratic Party, and the Santa Cruz County Democratic Party. She was also a member of the 2004 Democratic National Convention Platform Committee. She ran for the Arizona House of Representatives in District 25 in 2006, but was unsuccessful against incumbent Burns, losing by less than 800 votes.

On May 12, 2008, Fleming filed enough petition signatures to earn herself a spot on the ballot in November to once again run for the Arizona House, saying in a release that she was running as a "fiscal conservative who knows how to fund vital programs without frivolous spending." She has the endorsements of Progressive Majority and 2004 US presidential candidate and retired general Wesley Clark. Clark himself said that "Fleming will work tirelessly to develop new and innovative plans make Arizonans more secure, while honoring the values that make Arizona the great state that it is. With the goals of improving health care, education, retirement benefits, and fuel costs, Pat Fleming is just the kind of person the people of Arizona deserve to have representing them."

== Views ==
=== Health care ===
Fleming believes that all Arizonans deserve easy access to preventative medical care, both physical and mental, and affordable prescription drugs. She supports the expansion of Arizona's KidsCare program, which provides health insurance coverage to over 61,000 Arizona children. She also supports changes to the state-run HealthCare Group program, which provides insurance for many small businesses and the self-employed and wants to remove restrictions making it less available and financially viable for those who need it.

=== Education ===
Fleming supports an increase of the funding and resources available to Arizona's public schools, especially its rural schools. She also supports All-Day Kindergarten and higher pay for teachers and has expressed concerns that national testing standards are eroding the quality of education in subject areas such as music and art.

=== Energy independence ===
Fleming's energy plan calls for increases in investment in solar power. She supports an extension of investment tax credits for solar power products.
