= Ben Arredondo =

American politician (1947–2026)

Member of the Arizona House of Representatives from the 17th district
- In office January 10, 2011 – October 5, 2012

Personal details
- Born: Paul Ben Arredondo; July 3, 1947
- Died: July 8, 2026 (aged 79)
- Party: Republican Party (former) Democratic Party
- Spouse: Ruthann
- Education: Arizona State University
- Profession: Teacher

Paul Ben Arredondo (July 3, 1947 – July 8, 2026) was an American Republican politician who changed his party affiliation to Democrat and served in the Arizona House of Representatives from 2011 to 2012.

== Life and career ==
Paul Ben Arredondo was born in July 3, 1947.

Arredondo resigned in 2012 after he was indicted by the U.S. Department of Justice on charges of bribery, fraud, attempted extortion and making false statements from the time he served on the Tempe City Council and promoted a real estate deal using city lands.

Unexpectedly, during the investigation he admitted to mail fraud for his handling of the Arredondo Scholarship Fund, in which he solicited funds for 'average kids', but in fact much of the money went to his own relatives. In a plea deal on both charges, he was sentenced to 18 months of house arrest, plus probation.

Arredondo died on July 8, 2026, at the age of 79.
