= Terri Proud =

American politician

Member of the Arizona House of Representatives from the 26th district
- In office January 2011 – January 2013
- Preceded by: Nancy Young Wright

Personal details
- Born: May 25, 1962 (age 64) Willcox, Arizona
- Party: Republican
- Profession: Politician

Terri Proud was a member of the Arizona House of Representatives, representing Arizona's 26th District from January 2011 until January 2013.
