= Peggy Judd =

American politician

Member of the Arizona House of Representatives from the 25th district
- In office January 2011 – January 2013
- Preceded by: Patricia Fleming

Personal details
- Born: May 25, 1962 Willcox, Arizona
- Party: Republican
- Spouse: Kit Judd
- Education: University of Arizona (B.A. 2003)
- Profession: Politician

Peggy Suzanne Judd is an American politician from Arizona. A member of the Republican Party, she was a member of the Arizona House of Representatives from January 2011 to January 2013 (from Arizona's 25th legislative district). She was elected to the Cochise County Board of Supervisors in November 2016.

In 2022, she and another County Supervisor delayed certification of the election results over fears of election fraud. The next year they were indicted on felony charges of conspiracy and interference with an election officer. In October 2024 she entered into a deal in which she pled guilt to a misdemeanor, served probation and paid a $500 fine.

== Early life, education, and career ==
Judd holds a bachelor's degree in anthropology from the University of Arizona, and an architectural drafting technician certificate from the Phoenix Institute of Technology. As of 2010–11, her occupation was variously reported as administrative assistant and as "architectural drafting and reception/manager" at Willcox Real Estate Co.

== Arizona House of Representatives ==
She won election to the Arizona House of Representatives in 2010, from Arizona's 25th legislative district, and took office in 2011. Before being elected to the House, she was part of the Willcox Tea Party and a precinct committeewoman for the Cochise County Republican Party. She was recruited to run by Gail Griffin. Judd spent a single term in the House (in the 50th Legislature), and chose not to seek reelection in 2012.

== Cochise County supervisor ==
In November 2016, Judd was elected to the District 3 seat on the Cochise County Board of Supervisors, defeating Democratic candidate David Pinar. Her district covers the northern part of the county.

=== 2020 Election Interference ===
In the November 2020 presidential election, Joe Biden defeated Donald Trump, both in Arizona and nationally. Trump attempted to subvert the election outcome to remain in power. From November to December 2020, Judd, along with fellow Republican county supervisor Tom Crosby, delayed the canvass of the Cochise County results of the November 2022 election, disregarding the deadline set by state law. The supervisors' refusal to canvass the county votes prompted chaos, threatening to disrupt the elections for state schools superintendent and for a seat in the U.S. House of Representatives seat. A judge ultimately ordered the board to certify the results of the election.

After the November 6 election, Judd made public Facebook posts calling on God to guide Vice President Pence to unilaterally reject the election outcome during the counting of the electoral votes, which Pence declined to do. On January 6, 2021, Judd attended the Trump rally in Washington, D.C., that immediately preceded a march that led to the Capitol insurrection, in which a violent pro-Trump mob assaulted the Capitol and disrupted the counting of the electoral votes that formalized Biden's victory. On the evening of January 6, Judd posted photos of the march on her Facebook profile and praised the day's events. Later, Judd denied approaching the Capitol during the January 6 attack, but a timestamped photo that she shared with the Tucson Sentinel "seemed to demonstrate that the Judds were much closer to the Capitol than Judd had previously admitted."

In interviews and statements, Judd spread disinformation about the attack (falsely claiming that the U.S. Capitol Police and left-wingers had orchestrated that attack or entrapped Trump supporters to "make Trump look bad"). On her Facebook posts, she also shared slogans from the disproven, far-right QAnon conspiracy theory movement. After the attack, Judd faced calls for her resignation, and she deleted both her personal Facebook page and official Facebook pages.

=== Indictment and aftermath ===
Arizona Attorney General Kris Mayes subsequently investigated Judd's and Crosby's conduct in delaying the canvass of the Cochise County votes. In November 2023, a state grand jury indicted both officials on felony charges of interference with an election officer and criminal conspiracy. Judd and Crosby initially pleaded not guilty.

An effort in 2023 to gather signatures to trigger a recall election of Judd and Crosby was unsuccessful.

Judd was named chairwoman of the Board of Supervisors in May 2023, but stepped down from that role from that position in January 2024, citing the ill health of her husband, Kit Judd. However, Judd did not resign from the Board.

In October 2024, Judd accepted a plea offer to avoid trial and possible felony conviction. She pled guilty to refusing to perform the duty of an election officer, a class 3 misdemeanor. She was sentenced to 90 days of probation and a $500 fine.
