= Martha Garcia (Arizona politician) =

American politician

Member of the Arizona House of Representatives from the 13th district
- In office January 2005 – January 2011
- Preceded by: John A. Laredo
- Succeeded by: Richard Miranda

Personal details
- Party: Democratic
- Profession: Politician

Martha Garcia was a member of the Arizona House of Representatives from 2003 through 2011. She was first elected to the House in November 2004, and was re-elected twice, in 2006 and 2008. Although eligible to run for re-election in 2010, she chose not to.
