= Barbara McGuire (politician) =

American politician

Member of the Arizona Senate from the 8th district
- In office 2013 – January 9, 2017
- Preceded by: Michele Reagan
- Succeeded by: Frank Pratt

Member of the Arizona House of Representatives from the 23rd district
- In office 2007–2011
- Succeeded by: John Fillmore

Personal details
- Party: Democratic

Barbara McGuire is an American politician. A member of the Democratic Party, she represented the eighth district in the Arizona State Senate from 2013 to 2017, and the 23rd district in the Arizona House of Representatives from 2007 through 2011.

McGuire announced she was forming an exploratory committee to run for the United States House of Representatives seat in Arizona's 1st congressional district in the 2016 elections. However, she declined to run, with the seat being won by Tom O'Halleran. McGuire announced her candidacy for Arizona's 1st district against O'Halleran in the 2020 elections, citing the fact that she perceived him as too conservative.
