= John Fillmore =

American politician

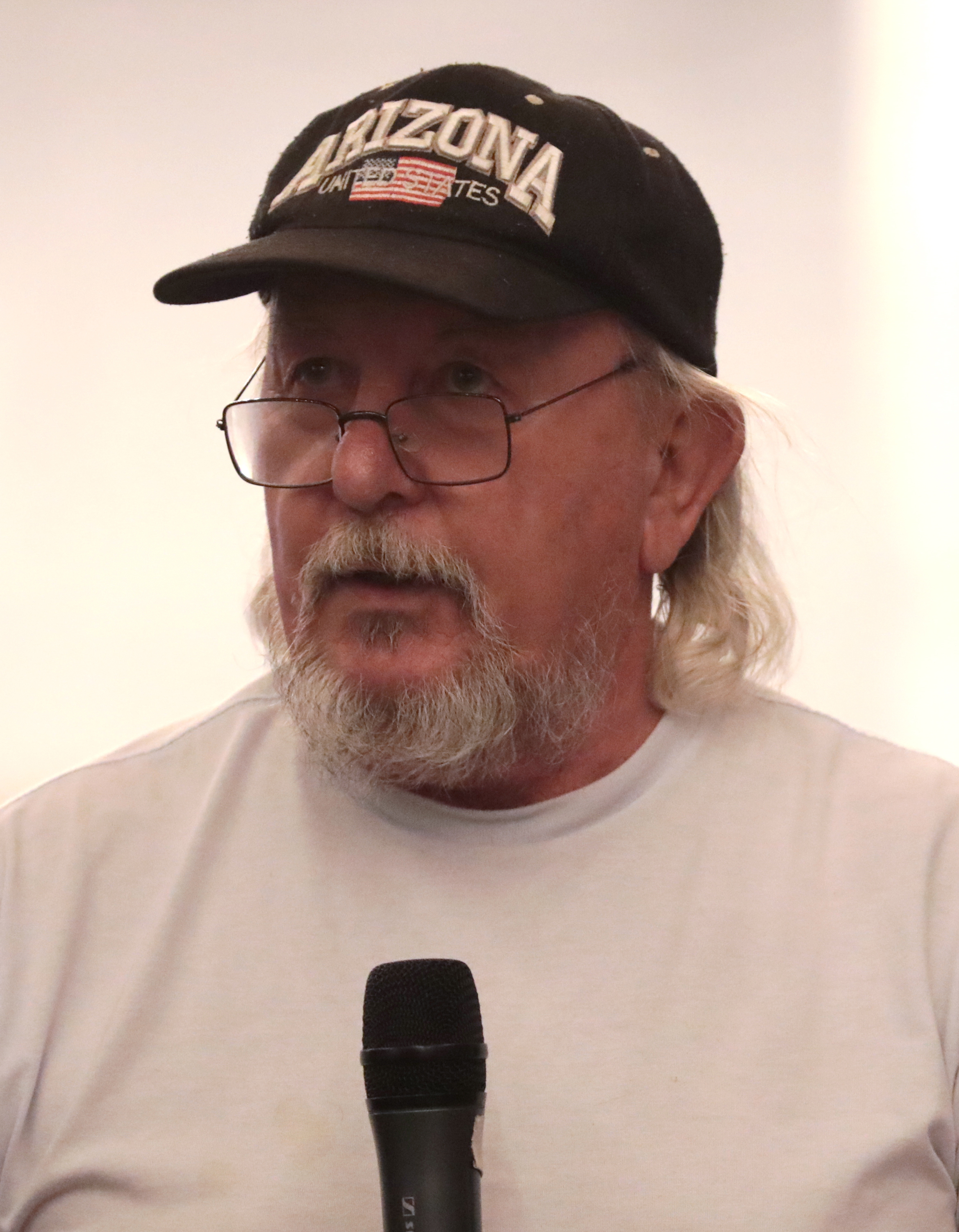
- Fillmore in 2023

Member of the Arizona House of Representatives from the 16th district
- In office January 14, 2019 – January 9, 2023 Serving with Jacqueline Parker
- Preceded by: Doug Coleman
- Succeeded by: Keith Seaman

Member of the Arizona House of Representatives from the 23rd district
- In office January 10, 2011 – January 14, 2013
- Preceded by: Barbara McGuire

Personal details
- Party: Republican
- Other political affiliations: Arizona Independent (since 2026)
- Website: www.johnfillmore.com

John Fillmore is an American politician and a former Republican member of the Arizona House of Representatives representing District 16 from 2019 to 2023. Fillmore also previously served in the Arizona House of Representatives from 2011 to 2013 from District 23. He was a member of the Arizona Freedom Caucus.

== Political career ==
Prior to being elected to public office, Fillmore was a small business owner and ran a chain of stores called the Weather Shack. Fillmore ran unsuccessfully in 2012 and 2014, but successfully ran again in 2018 following Doug Coleman's decision to not run for reelection.

In 2020, he proposed House Bill 2082, to "prevent public schools from penalizing employees who use incorrect pronouns for transgender students. It would also prohibit schools from requiring that employees use correct pronouns for students, unless the pronoun 'corresponds to the sex listed on that student's birth certificate.'"

After Donald Trump lost the 2020 election and refused to concede while making claims of fraud, Fillmore sponsored HB 2701, a bill which would, among other things, limit mail-in voting in Arizona as well as limit the number of voting centers in each county. Counties with populations less than 200,000 persons would have a maximum of four centers, those from 200,000 to 1,000,000 would have not more than 8 voting centers, and those with over 1,000,000 persons would be limited to 15 voting centers. The very populous Maricopa County would therefore have about one center for 300,000 people, while the very spread out Coconino County would have four voting centers total.

In 2022, Fillmore proposed to eliminate most early and absentee voting, as well as force people to vote in their home precincts rather than at voting centers across the state of Arizona. Fillmore also introduced a bill that would have allowed the Arizona legislature to overturn election results, which was rejected by Arizona House speaker Rusty Bowers. He was defeated for reelection in the Republican primary in August 2022.
