= Nancy Young Wright =

American politician

Member of the Arizona House of Representatives from the 26th district
- In office January 2009 – January 2011
- Preceded by: J. Peter Hershberger; Lena Saradnik
- Succeeded by: Terri Proud

Personal details
- Party: Democratic
- Profession: Politician

Nancy Young Wright was a member of the Arizona House of Representatives from 2009 through 2011. She was elected to the House in November 2008. She ran for re-election in 2010, but was defeated.
