= Amanda Reeve =

American politician

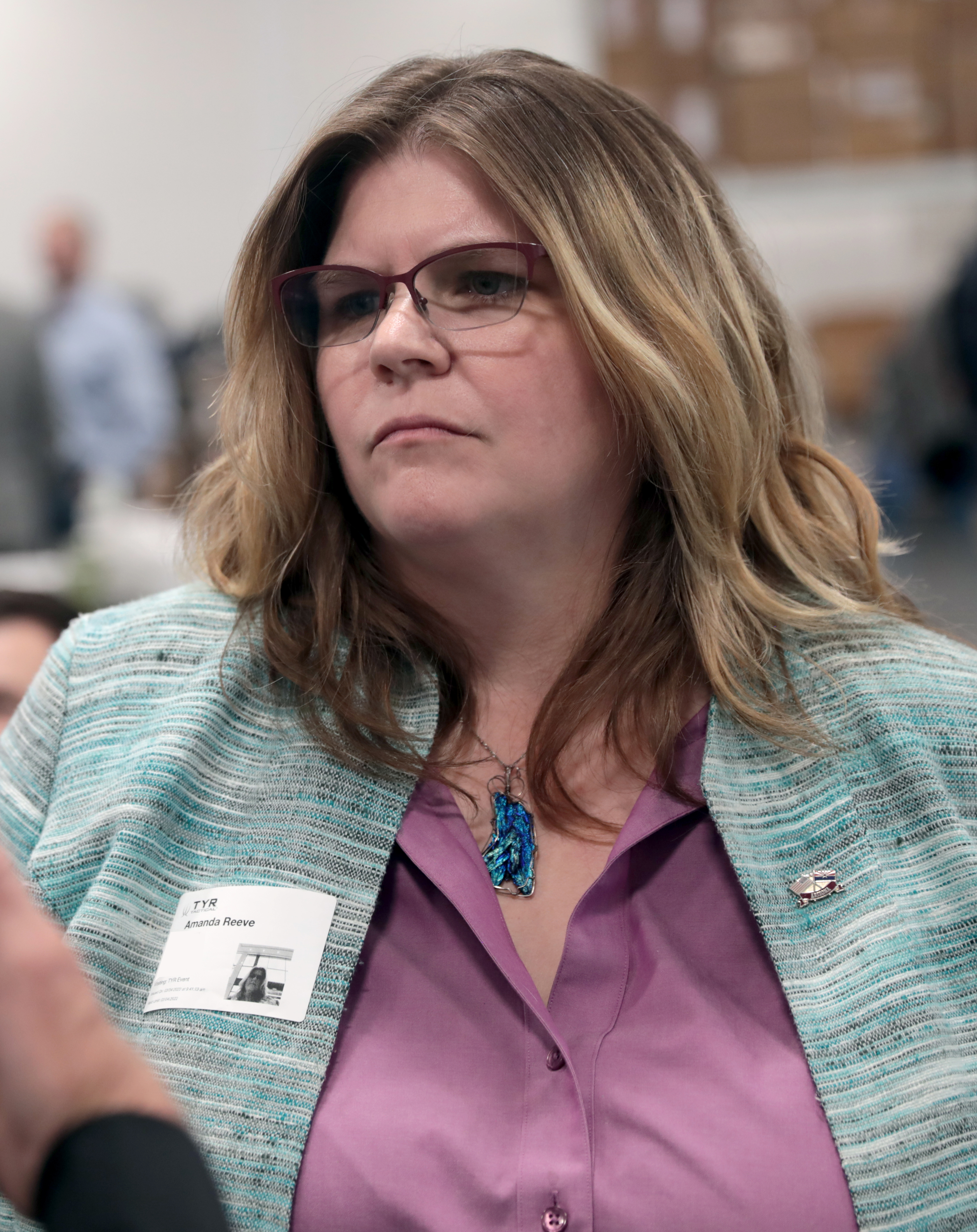

Member of the Arizona House of Representatives from the 6th district
- In office February 2010 – January 14, 2013 Serving with Carl Seel
- Preceded by: Sam Crump

Personal details
- Party: Republican

Amanda A. Reeve is an American politician. She was a member of the Arizona House of Representatives representing District 6, serving from 2010 to 2013. Reeve is a member of the Republican party.
