= James Weiers =

American politician (1953–2024)

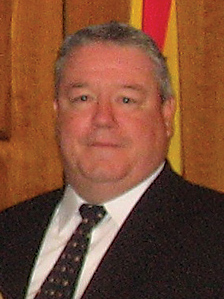
- Weiers in 2006

Speaker of the Arizona House of Representatives
- In office January 10, 2005 – January 12, 2009
- Preceded by: Jake Flake
- Succeeded by: Kirk Adams
- In office January 8, 2001 – January 6, 2003
- Preceded by: Jeff Groscost
- Succeeded by: Jake Flake

Member of the Arizona Senate from the 10th district
- In office January 2003 – January 2005
- Preceded by: Darden C. Hamilton (from prior District 16, changed due to redistricting)
- Succeeded by: Linda Gray

Member of the Arizona House of Representatives from the 16th district
- In office January 1995 – January 2003
- Preceded by: John Kaits
- Succeeded by: Doug Quelland

Member of the Arizona House of Representatives from the 10th district
- In office January 2005 – January 2013
- Preceded by: Linda Gray

Personal details
- Born: September 8, 1953
- Died: April 19, 2024 (aged 70)
- Party: Republican
- Relatives: Jerry Weiers (brother)
- Profession: Politician

James Weiers (September 8, 1953 – April 19, 2024) was a Republican member of the Arizona Senate and the Arizona House of Representatives, representing various Arizona Legislative Districts. He was initially elected to the House in 1994, where he served as one of the two District 16 representatives from January 1995 through January 2003. In 2002, he ran and won the seat for the Arizona State Senate for District 10, which was similar to the prior District 16 after redistricting. He served in the Senate for one term, from January 2003 through January 2005. In 2004, he ran successfully for the House, again in District 10. He was re-elected three more times to represent the House, serving from January 2005 through January 2013. He served twice as Speaker of the House, the first time from 2001 to 2002, and the second time from 2005 to 2009. Weiers died on April 19, 2024.

== Personal life ==
Weiers had a brother, who is also a local Arizona politician and fellow Arizona State Legislature member, Jerry Weiers.
