= Rae Waters =

American politician

Member of the Arizona House of Representatives from the 20th district
- In office January 2008 – January 10, 2011

Personal details
- Born: June 15, 1956 (age 70) Fort Dix, NJ
- Party: Democratic
- Profession: Politician

Rae Waters is a Democratic politician. She served as one of the two State Representatives for Arizona's 20th Legislative district from 2009 to 2011. She lost her re-election bid in the 2010 election.

Waters is also in her 12th year serving on the local Kyrene Elementary School District Governing Board, where she has served three terms as president. Her term expired in 2010.

== Political Positions ==
According to Votesmart.org, Waters received a 100% rating from Planned Parenthood, an 'A' from the Sierra Club, and a 'D' from the NRA.
