= Vic Williams =

American politician (born 1963)

Member of the Arizona House of Representatives from the 26th district
- In office January 2009 – January 2013
- Preceded by: Pete Hershberger

Personal details
- Born: April 6, 1963 Whittier, California, U.S.
- Party: Republican
- Profession: Politician

Vic Williams was a member of the Arizona House of Representatives, representing Arizona's 26th District from January 2009 until January 2013.
