= Tom Chabin =

American politician (born 1951)

Member of the Arizona House of Representatives from the 2nd district
- In office 2007–2013

Personal details
- Born: May 20, 1951 (age 75) Hutchinson, Kansas
- Party: Democratic
- Children: One son
- Education: Northern Arizona University

Tom Chabin (born May 20, 1951) is an American politician and a former Democratic member of the Arizona State Senate representing the 2nd District from his appointment in September 2007 until 2012. He served on the Coconino County Board of Supervisors from 1992 to 2000. He was a democratic nominee for the Arizona Corporation Commission in 2016.
