= Sam Crump =

American politician

Member of the Arizona House of Representatives from the 6th district
- In office January 2007 – January 2010
- Preceded by: Ted Carpenter; Pamela Gorman
- Succeeded by: Amanda Reeve

Personal details
- Party: Republican
- Profession: Politician

Sam Crump was a member of the Arizona House of Representatives from 2007 through 2010. He was elected to the State House in November 2006, and won re-election in 2008. He resigned in January 2010, in order to run for the U.S. House of Representatives, for the seat being vacated by John Shadegg.
