= Russell Jones (politician) =

American politician (born 1948)

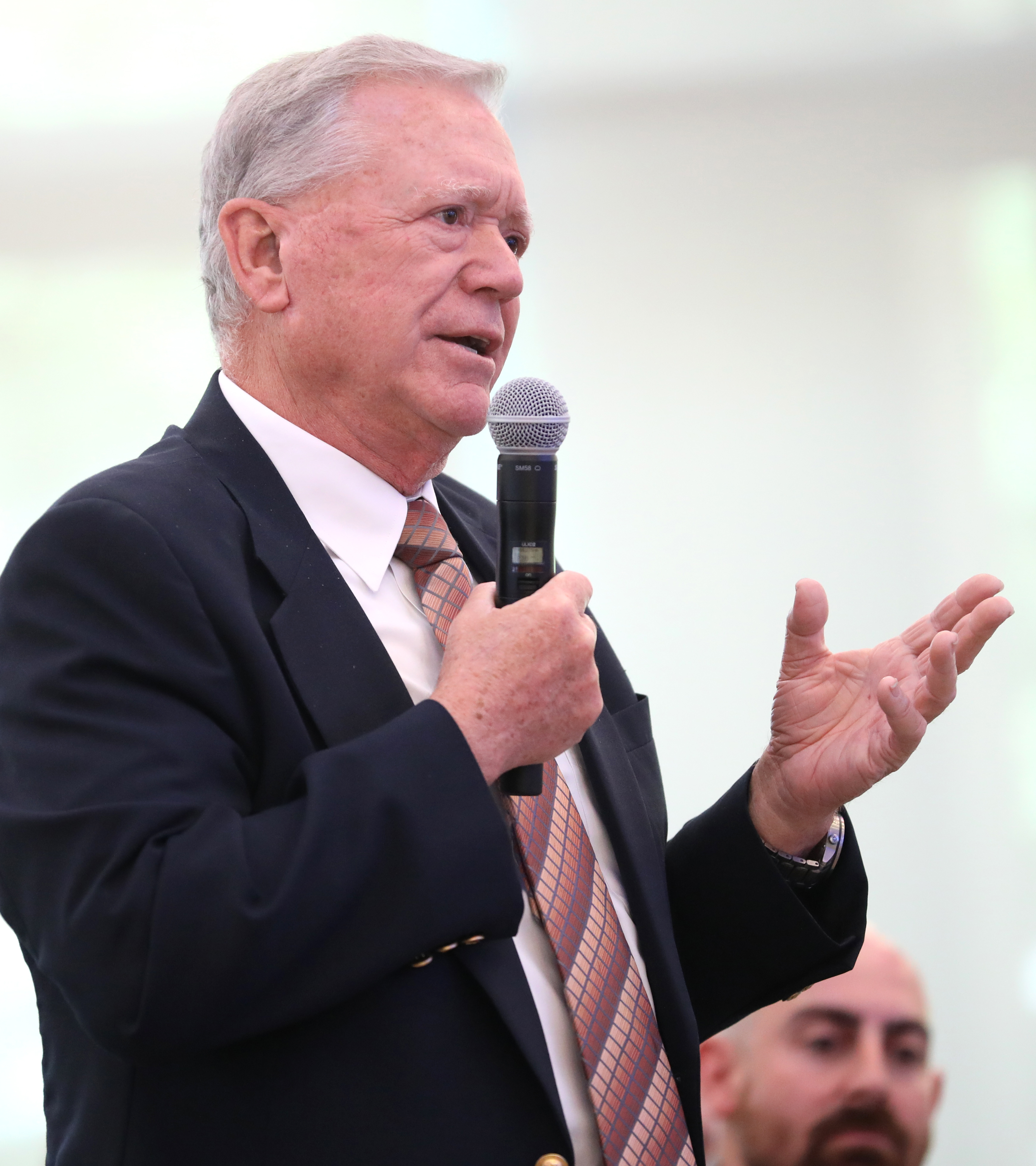

Member of the Arizona House of Representatives from the 24th district
- In office January 2005 – January 2007
- Preceded by: Jim Carruthers
- Succeeded by: Theresa Ulmer

Member of the Arizona House of Representatives from the 24th district
- In office January 2009 – January 2013
- Preceded by: Theresa Ulmer
- Succeeded by: NA

Personal details
- Born: Russell Lloyd Jones; November 21, 1948 San Diego, California, U.S
- Party: Republican
- Education: San Diego State University
- Profession: Customs house broker

Russell "Russ" Lloyd Jones (born May 11, 1948) is an American politician and customs house broker. He was a member of the Arizona House of Representatives.

== Early life ==
Russell "Russ" Lloyd Jones was born on May 11, 1948, in San Diego, California. He attended Calexico Union High School.

Jones attended San Diego State University, graduating with a degree in business administration. While there, he was a member of Alpha Phi Omega. He then attended the University of Arizona, where he studied economic development and receved a B.E.D.C.

== Career ==
=== Military ===
Jones served in the United States Army's 63rd Topo Corps, 82nd Airborne from 1970 to 1972. He currently serves as a pilot with the rank of major in the 508th Squadron of the Civil Air Patrol in Yuma, Arizona.

=== Customs house broker ===
Jones is a third-generation customs house broker. He is the president and CEO of R. L. Jones Management Group, previously known as R. L. Jones Customhouse Brokers, Inc., which was founded by his grandfather in 1938. He is a licensed insurance broker in the State of Arizona and has a United States Customhouse Broker in the San Diego CMC and the Nogales CMC.

Jones was previously the president of Calexico Warehouse & Transfer, Intercontinental Cargo Federation, Richard L. Jones Customhouse Brokers Incorporated, San Diego Warehouse & Transfer, San Luis International Freight Services and San Luis Warehouse & Transfer.

He is a member of the National Customhouse Brokers Freight Forwarders Association, the San Diego Customs Brokers Association, and the Southwest Arizona Port Users Association. He was a co-founder of the Bank of Yuma.

=== Politics ===
Jones was a member of the Arizona House of Representatives, representing Arizona's 24th District as a Republican from January 2005 until January 2007. After his first term, Jones chose not to run in the 2006 election, and was replaced by Theresa Ulmer.

In the following election in 2008, Jones re-entered the race and defeated Ulmer in the general election to regain his seat in the House of Representatives for the 24th District. His second term started in January 2009 and ended in January 2013, after being re-elected in 2010 for a third term.

While in the House, Jones was chair of the Agriculture and Water Committee, co-chair of the Border Security Advisory Committee, and vice-chair of the Natural Resources and Rural Affairs Committee. He also served on the Appropriations Committee; the Counties, Municipalities and Military Affairs Committee; the Sub Appropriations on Multi-Year Budgeting Committee; and the Transportation Committee Jones served on the board of the Agro-Industries Committee of the Arizona/Mexico Commission and the Border Trade Alliance.

After a redistricting dissolved the 24th District, Jones ran for re-election in the House for the new District 13, but lost the Republican primary in August 2012 to Steve Montenegro.

== Personal life ==
Jones and his wife, Janet Francis Jones, have two children: Eric and Shelley. They moved to Yuma, Arizona, in 1974.

He is the treasurer of the San Luis, Arizona Industrial Park and a board member of the Arizona Community Foundation, Border Volunteer Corps, the Yuma County Foundation, the Yuma Orchestra Association, Yuma Community Food Bank, and the Arts Commission in San Luis, Arizona. He was a co-founder and charter president of the San Luis Frontera Rotary Club and also served on the Caballeros de Yuma District Advisory Committee for the Boy Scouts of America.

Jones is bilingual, speaking English and Spanish.
