= Daniel Patterson (politician) =

American politician

Member of the Arizona House of Representatives from the 29th district
- In office January 2009 – April 2012
- Preceded by: Tom Prezelski; Linda Lopez
- Succeeded by: Lydia Hernandez; Martin J. Quezada

Personal details
- Born: Lansing, Michigan
- Party: Democratic
- Profession: Politician

Daniel Patterson was a member of the Arizona House of Representatives, representing Arizona's 29th District from January 2009 until his resignation in April 2012.

Patterson won re-election to the Arizona House during the 2010 election, but a complaint had been filed by fellow Democratic legislator Katie Hobbs in late February 2012. She and others alleged ethics violations which included "domestic violence, intimidating fellow lawmakers, outbursts of anger, marijuana use, and offers to a lobbyist to trade sex for a vote".

He resigned shortly before a vote was taken in the House regarding whether or not he would be expelled. Patterson had described the claims related to domestic violence and sex as "outrageous lies(s)" and said that his actions related to the other allegations "had been misconstrued." His resignation came after the bipartisan House Ethics Committee had unanimously voted to expel him from the body. Patterson was acquitted of the domestic violence charges in August 2012.
