= Cecil Ash =

American politician

Member of the Arizona House of Representatives from the 18th district
- In office January 2009 – January 2013
- Preceded by: Mark Anderson

Personal details
- Born: November 21, 1948
- Party: Republican
- Profession: Politician

Cecil Ash was a member of the Arizona House of Representatives, representing Arizona's 18th District from January 2009 until January 2013.
