= Jeff Dial =

American politician

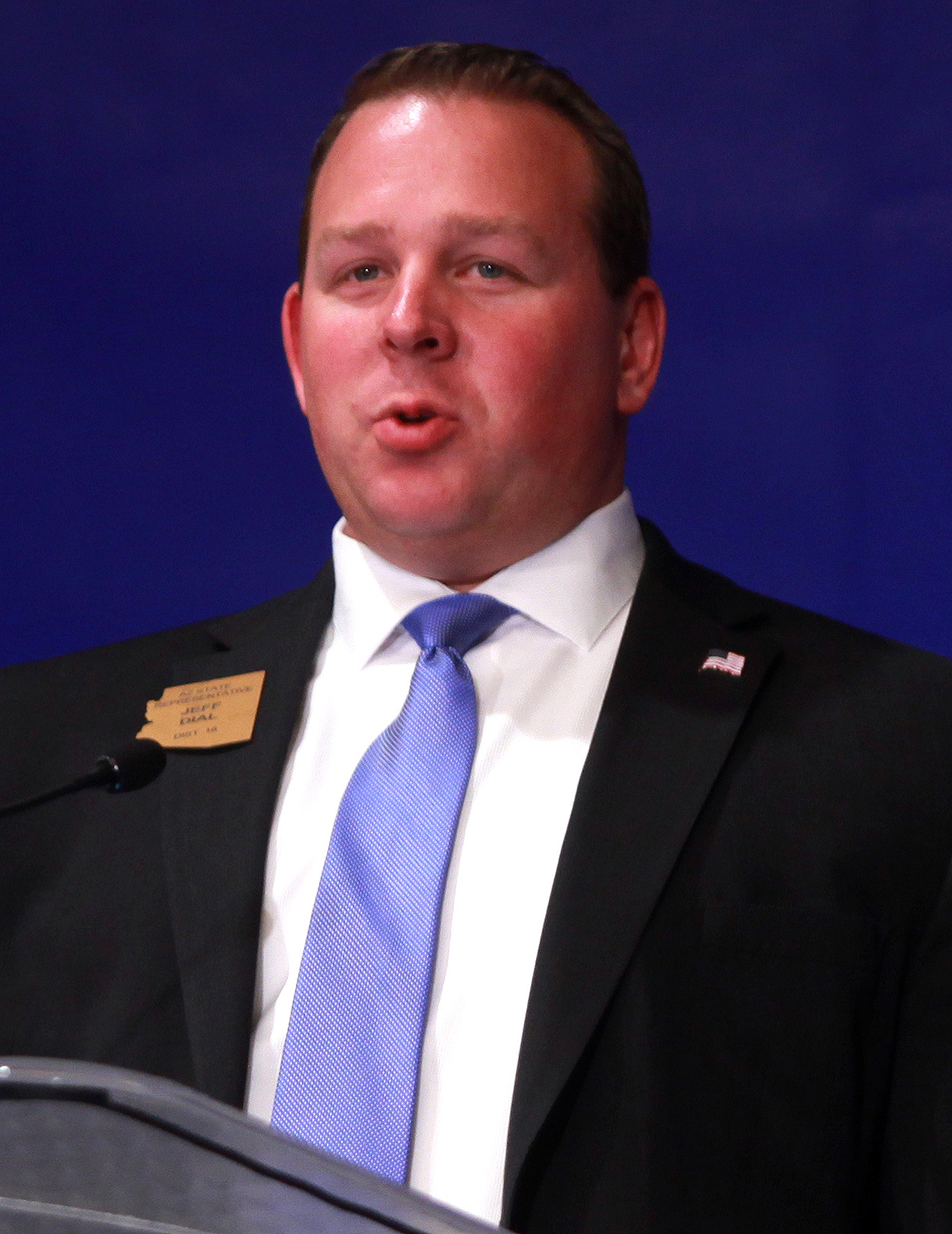
- Dial speaking in 2014

Member of the Arizona Senate from the 18th district
- In office 2014 – January 9, 2017
- Succeeded by: Sean Bowie

Member of the Arizona House of Representatives
- In office 2010–2014

Personal details
- Born: Jeffrey A. Dial; April 4, 1976 (age 50) Los Angeles County, California
- Party: Republican

Military service
- Allegiance: United States
- Branch/service: United States Army Reserve
- Years of service: 1996–2004

Jeff Dial (born April 4, 1976, in Los Angeles County, California) is a former State Senator in the Arizona State Legislature.

Dial was elected to the Arizona House of Representatives in 2010 and was reelected in 2012.

Dial was elected to the Arizona Senate representing the 18th district in 2014.

In 2015, the Arizona Republic reported that Dial had made an eight-year commitment to the United States Army Reserve in 1996, but Dial said he received an honorably discharge and provided a copy of his honorable discharge and was moved to the Individual Ready Reserve due to his weight in 2004.

In 2016, Dial's reelection was challenged by Republican candidate Frank Schmuck, an Airline Pilot portrayed himself as a conservative running against a moderate. Schmuck also persistently questioned Dial's military record, asking whether Dial really earned the "Veteran of the Army Reserve" status that Dial claimed in his campaign materials.

On August 30, 2016, Schmuck defeated Dial in the Republican primary election, receiving 53.4% of the vote.

Primary election night in a tweet Dial conceded the election to Schmuck. In the general election Schmuck lost to Democratic candidate Sean Bowie. Bowie and Green candidate Linda Macias, both of whom ran uncontested in their parties' primary elections.

Jeff Dial is now working as a real estate agent in the greater Phoenix-Metro area and serves on the board of directors for the Scottsdale Area Association of REALTORS® and the Arizona Association of Realtors.
