= Doug Quelland =

American politician

Member of the Arizona Senate from the 20th district
- In office January 14, 2008 – January 14, 2010
- Succeeded by: Kimberly Yee

Personal details
- Born: June 15, 1948 (age 78)
- Party: None

Doug Quelland, born June 15, 1948, is an Arizonan politician. He currently has no party affiliation but has previously run as a Republican. He ran unsuccessfully for U.S. House of Representatives in 1998 and successfully for the Arizona House of Representatives, District 10, in 2002 and 2004. Quelland was voted out in 2006 and then back in again in 2008. He was forced to resign in 2010 after a government investigative commission found that he'd violated campaign finance laws in his 2008 campaign. He ran unsuccessfully again for the Arizona House in 2010, and lost bids for a seat in the Arizona Senate in 2012, 2014 and 2016 as well.

== Elections ==
State	District	Election Year	Party affiliation
AZ	20	2018	none
AZ	20	2016	none
AZ	20	2012	none
AZ	10	2010	Republican
AZ	10	2008	Republican

Source: AZSos.gov Historical Elections
