= Steve Court =

American politician

Member of the Arizona House of Representatives from the 18th district
- In office November 2008 – January 2013

Personal details
- Born: July 21, 1950 (age 76) Massachusetts, U.S.
- Party: Republican
- Education: University of Massachusetts Lowell (BS)

Steve Court (born July 21, 1950) is an American politician who served as a member of the Arizona House of Representatives, representing District 18. He was the majority leader of the Arizona House of Representatives. First elected in 2008, he retired after the expiration of his second term in January 2013.

== Early life and education ==
Court was born and raised in Massachusetts. He graduated from the University of Massachusetts Lowell with a Bachelor of Science degree in accounting.

== Career ==
In 1974, Court moved to Arizona, where he spent the next twenty years working in the Accounting and Financial Analysis department for the telecommunications company Motorola. After working in Motorola, he opened a small business in 1996, and sold it ten years later to one of his sons.

== Political career ==
=== 2008 election ===
Court was first elected to the Arizona House of Representatives in 2008. Along with fellow Republican Cecil Ash, Court defeated Democrat Tammie Pursley and Independent Joe Brown.

Arizona State House of Representatives, District 18 (2008)
Party	Candidate	Votes	%
Republican	Cecil Ash	21,753	45.1
Republican	Steve Court	21,753	45.1
Democratic	Tammie Pursley	17,844	37
Independent	Joe Brown	8,617	17.9
Turnout		48,214	

=== 2009–2010 ===
In the 2009–2010 legislative session, Court served on these committees:

- Appropriations Committee
- Education Committee
- Health and Human Services Committee

He was the vice chairman of the Health and Human Services Committee.

=== 2010 election ===
Court was reelected, along with fellow incumbent Cecil Ash, during the 2010 elections. They faced no opposition during the Republican primary, and defeated Democrat Michael Conway and Libertarian Chris A. H. Will during the general election.

Arizona State House of Representatives, District 18 (2010)
Party	Candidate	Votes	%
Republican	Cecil Ash	16,222	57.2
Republican	Steve Court	16,177	45.1
Democratic	Michael Conway	11,568	37
Libertarian	Chris A.H. Will	3,452	17.9
Turnout		47,419	

=== 2011–2012 ===
In the 2011–2012 legislative session, Court served on the following committees:

- Appropriations Committee, Arizona House of Representatives, Vice Chair
- Education Committee, Arizona House of Representatives
- Higher Education, Innovation and Reform Committee, Arizona House of Representatives, Chair

Court did not seek another term during the 2012 general election and will retire when his current term ends.

== Personal life ==
Court is married to Susan, the couple has four children.
