= List of representatives and senators of the Arizona Legislature by district, 2003–2013 =

List of representatives and senators of the Arizona Legislature by legislative districts.

== Arizona – by legislature ==
	Senate			
Affiliation			Total	Majority
Affiliation	Republican Party	Democratic Party	Total	Majority
Members 03-04	17	13	30	4
Members 05-06	18	12	30	6
Members 07-08	17	13	30	4
Members 09-10	18	12	30	6
Members 11–13	21	9	30	12

	House			
Affiliation			Total	Majority
Affiliation	Republican Party	Democratic Party	Total	Majority
Members 03-04	39	21	30	18
Members 05-06	38	22	30	17
Members 07-08	33	27	30	6
Members 09-10	35	25	30	10
Members 11–13	40	21	30	19

== Arizona – key senators ==
Legisl.	President of Senate	President Pro Tempore	Majority Leader	Majority Whip	Minority Leader	Minority Ass. Leader	Minority Whip
2003–2004	Ken Bennett (R) 1	Carolyn Allen (R) 8	Timothy Bee (R) 30	Marilyn Jarrett (R) 19	Jack Brown (D) 5	Linda Aguirre (D) 16	Pete Rios (D) 23
2005–2006	Ken Bennett (R) 1	Jake Flake (R) 5	Timothy Bee (R) 30	Jay Tibshraeny (R) 21	Linda Aguirre (D) 16	Richard Miranda (D) 13	Jorge Luis Garcia (D) 27
2007–2008	Timothy Bee (R) 30	Robert Blendu (R) 12	Thayer Verschoor (R) 22	John Huppenthal (R) 20	Marsha Arzberger (D) 25	Jorge Luis Garcia (D) 27	Rebecca Rios (D) 23
2009–2010	Robert "Bob" Burns (R) 9	Barbara Leff (R)	Chuck Gray (R) 19	Steve Pierce (R) 1	Jorge Luis Garcia (D) 27	Rebecca Rios (D) 23	Linda Lopez (D) 29
2011–2012	Steve Pierce (R)	Sylvia Allen (R) 6	Andy Biggs (R) 12	Frank Antenori (R) 30	David Schapira (D) 17	Leah Landrum Taylor (D) 27	Paula Aboud (D) 28

== Arizona – by district ==
† Member was appointed.

=== Arizona – 1st district – Prescott – Coconino County ===
Legisl.	Senator	P	Info	Representative 1	P	Info	Representative 2	P	Info
2003–2004	Ken Bennett	(R)		Lucy Mason	(R)	1	Tom O'Halleran	(R)	1
2005–2006	Ken Bennett; President of Senate	(R)	1	Lucy Mason	(R)	1	Tom O'Halleran	(R)	1
2007–2008	Tom O'Halleran	(R)	1	Andy Tobin	(R)		Lucy Mason	(R)	
2009–2010	Steve Pierce; President of Senate	(R)	1	Andy Tobin	(R)	1	Lucy Mason	(R)	1
2011–2012	Steve Pierce	(R)		Andy Tobin	(R)		Karen Fann	(R)	

=== Arizona – 2nd district – Flagstaff – Navajo County & Apache County ===
Legisl.	Senator	P	Info	Representative 1	P	Info	Representative 2	P	Info
2003–2004	Jack C. Jackson Sr	(D)		Jack C. Jackson, Jr.	(D)		Sylvia Laughter	(D)	
2005–2006	Albert Hale	(D)	2	Albert Tom	(D)	2	Ann Kirkpatrick	(D)	2
2007–2008	Albert Hale	(D)	2	Albert Tom	(D)		Ann Kirkpatrick(2007) †Christopher Deschene (2007–2008)	(D)	
2009–2010	Albert Hale	(D)	2	Christopher Deschene	(D)	2	Tom Chabin	(D)	2
2011–2012	Jack C. Jackson, Jr.	(D)		Tom Chabin	(D)		Albert Hale	(D)	

=== Arizona – 3rd district – Mohave County – La Paz County N. ===
Legisl.	Senator	P	Info	Representative 1	P	Info	Representative 2	P	Info
2003–2004	Linda Binder	(R)		Joe Hart	(R)		Bill Wagner	(R)	
2005–2006	Ron Gould	(R)	3	Trish Groe	(R)	3	Nancy G. McLain	(R)	3
2007–2008	Ron Gould	(R)	3	Trish Groe	(R)	3	Nancy G. McLain	(R)	
2009–2010	Ron Gould	(R)	3	Doris Goodale	(R)	3	Nancy G. McLain	(R)	3
2011–2012	Ron Gould	(R)		Doris Goodale	(R)		Nancy G. McLain	(R)	

=== Arizona – 4th district – Yavapai County South – Maricopa County North ===
Legisl.	Senator	P	Info	Representative 1	P	Info	Representative 2	P	Info
2003–2004	Jack W. Harper	(R)		Tom Boone	(R)		Carole Hubbs	(R)	
2005–2006	Jack W. Harper	(R)	4	Tom Boone	(R)	4	Judy Burges	(R)	4
2007–2008	Jack W. Harper	(R)	4	Tom Boone	(R)	4	Judy Burges	(R)	4
2009–2010	Jack W. Harper	(R)	4	Tom Boone	(R)	4	Judy Burges	(R)	4
2011–2012	Scott Bundgaard	(R)		Jack W. Harper	(R)	4	Judy Burges	(R)	4

=== Arizona – 5th district – Gila County – Snowflake ===
Legisl.	Senator	P	Info	Representative 1	P	Info	Representative 2	P	Info
2003–2004	Jack A. Brown	(D)		Jake Flake	(R)		Bill Konopnicki	(R)	
2005–2006	Jake Flake; President Pro Tempore	(R)	5	Jack A. Brown	(D)	5	Bill Konopnicki	(R)	5
2007–2008	Jake Flake (2007–2008); Sylvia Allen (2008)	(R)	5	Jack A. Brown	(D)		Bill Konopnicki	(R)	
2009–2010	Sylvia Allen	(R)	5	Jack A. Brown	(D)		Bill Konopnicki	(R)	
2011–2012	Sylvia Allen	(R)	5	Brenda Barton	(R)		Chester Crandell	(R)	

=== Arizona – 6th district – Phoenix North – Cave Creek ===
Legisl.	Senator	P	Info	Representative 1	P	Info	Representative 2	P	Info
2003–2004	Dean Martin	(R)		Ted Carpenter	(R)		Clancy Jayne	(R)	
2005–2006	Dean Martin	(R)	6	Ted Carpenter	(R)		Pamela Gorman	(R)	
2007–2008	Pamela Gorman	(R)	6 Site	Doug Clark	(R)		Sam Crump	(R)	
2009–2010	Pamela Gorman	(R)		Sam Crump	(R)		Carl Seel	(R)	
2011–2012	Lori Klein	(R)		Amanda Reeve	(R)		Carl Seel	(R)	

=== Arizona – 7th district – Phoenix North-North-East – Carefree ===
Legisl.	Senator	P	Info	Representative 1	P	Info	Representative 2	P	Info
2003–2004	Jim Waring	(R)		John Allen	(R)		Ray Barnes	(R)	
2005–2006	Jim Waring	(R)	7	David Burnell Smith	(R)		Ray Barnes	(R)	
2007–2008	Jim Waring	(R)	7	Nancy Barto	(R)		Ray Barnes	(R)	
2009–2010	Jim Waring	(R)	7	Nancy Barto	(R)		Ray Barnes	(R)	
2011–2012	Nancy Barto	(R)		Heather Carter	(R)		David Smith	(R)	

=== Arizona – 8th district – Phoenix North-East – Scottsdale ===
Legisl.	Senator	P	Info	Representative 1	P	Info	Representative 2	P	Info
2003–2004	Carolyn Allen	(R)		Michele Reagan	(R)		Colette Rosati	(R)	
2005–2006	Carolyn Allen	(R)	8	Michele Reagan	(R)		Colette Rosati	(R)	
2007–2008	Carolyn Allen	(R)	8	Michele Reagan	(R)		John Kavanagh	(R)	
2009–2010	Carolyn S. Allen	(R)		Michele Reagan	(R)		John Kavanagh	(R)	
2011–2012	Michele Reagan	(R)		Michelle Ugenti	(R)		John Kavanagh	(R)	

=== Arizona – 9th district – Phoenix North-West – Sun City – Peoria ===
Legisl.	Senator	P	Info	Representative 1	P	Info	Representative 2	P	Info
2003–2004	Bob Burns	(R)		Bob Stump	(R)		Phil Hanson	(R)	
2005–2006	Bob Burns	(R)	9	Bob Stump	(R)		Rick Murphy	(R)	
2007–2008	Bob Burns	(R)	9	Bob Stump	(R)		Rick Murphy	(R)	
2009–2010	Bob Burns	(R)		Rick Murphy	(R)		Debbie Lesko	(R)	
2011–2012	Rick Murphy	(R)		Debbie Lesko	(R)		Rick Gray (Arizona politician)	(R)	

=== Arizona – 10th district – Phoenix North Central – Glendale ===
Legisl.	Senator	P	Info	Representative 1	P	Info	Representative 2	P	Info
2003–2004	Jim Weiers	(R)		Linda Gray	(R)		Doug Quelland	(R)	
2005–2006	Linda Gray	(R)	10 (M. 1997–)	Jim Weiers	(R)		Doug Quelland	(R)	
2007–2008	Linda Gray	(R)	10 (M. 1997–)	Doug Quelland	(R)		Jackie Thrasher	(D)	
2009–2010	Linda Gray	(R)		Jim Weiers	(R)		Doug Quelland	(R)	
2011–2012	Linda Gray	(R)		Jim Weiers	(R)		Kimberly Yee	(R)	

=== Arizona – 11th district – Phoenix East – Paradise Valley ===
Legisl.	Senator	P	Info	Representative 1	P	Info	Representative 2	P	Info
2003–2004	Barbara Leff	(R)		Deb Gullett	(R)		Stephen Tully	(R)	
2005–2006	Barbara Leff	(R)	11	John Allen	(R)		Stephen Tully	(R)	
2007–2008	Barbara Leff	(R)	11 (M. 1997–)	Adam Driggs	(R)		Mark Anthony Desimone	(D)	
2009–2010	Barbara Leff	(R)		Adam Driggs	(R)		Eric Meyer	(D)	
2011–2012	Adam Driggs	(R)		Eric Meyer	(D)		Kate Brophy McGee	(D)	

=== Arizona – 12th district – Phoenix West – Litchfield Park ===
Legisl.	Senator	P	Info	Representative 1	P	Info	Representative 2	P	Info
2003–2004	Robert Blendu	(R)	12 (M. 1995–)	Bill Arnold	(R)		John Nelson	(R)	
2005–2006	Robert Blendu	(R)	12 (M. 1995–)	Jerry Weiers	(R)		John Nelson	(R)	
2007–2008	Robert Blendu; President Pro Tempore	(R)	12 (M. 1995–)	Jerry Weiers	(R)		John Nelson	(R)	
2009–2010	John Nelson	(R)		Jerry Weiers	(R)		Steve Montenegro	(R)	
2011–2012	John Nelson	(R)		Jerry Weiers	(R)		Steve Montenegro	(R)	

=== Arizona – 13th district – Phoenix South-West – Tolleson ===
Legisl.	Senator	P	Info	Representative 1	P	Info	Representative 2	P	Info
2003–2004	Richard Miranda	(D)		Steve Gallardo	(D)		John Loredo	(D)	
2005–2006	Richard Miranda; Assistant Minority Leader	(D)	13	Steve Gallardo	(D)		Martha Garcia	(D)	
2007–2008	Richard Miranda	(D)	13	Steve Gallardo	(D)		Martha Garcia	(D)	
2009–2010	Richard Miranda	(D)		Steve Gallardo	(D)		Martha Garcia	(D)	
2011–2012	Steve Gallardo	(D)		Richard Miranda	(D)		Anna Tovar	(D)	

Photos : Miranda

=== Arizona – 14th district – Phoenix South Central ===
Legisl.	Senator	P	Info	Representative 1	P	Info	Representative 2	P	Info
2003–2004	Bill Brotherton	(D)		Robert Meza	(D)		Debbie McCune Davis	(D)	
2005–2006	Bill Brotherton	(D)	14	Robert Meza	(D)		Debbie McCune Davis	(D)	
2007–2008	Debbie McCune Davis	(D)	14	Robert Meza	(D)		Chad Campbell	(D)	
2009–2010	Debbie McCune Davis	(D)		Robert Meza	(D)		Chad Campbell	(D)	
2011–2012	Robert Meza	(D)		Debbie McCune Davis	(D)		Chad Campbell	(D)	

=== Arizona – 15th district – Phoenix South-East Central ===
Legisl.	Senator	P	Info	Representative 1	P	Info	Representative 2	P	Info
2003–2004	Ken Cheuvront	(D)	15	Ken Clark	(D)		Wally Straughn	(D)	
2005–2006	Ken Cheuvront	(D)	15	Kyrsten Sinema	(D)		David Lujan	(D)	
2007–2008	Ken Cheuvront	(D)	15	Kyrsten Sinema	(D)		David Lujan	(D)	
2009–2010	Ken Cheuvront	(D)	15	Kyrsten Sinema	(D)		David Lujan	(D)	
2011–2012	Kyrsten Sinema	(D)		Lela Alston	(D)		Katie Hobbs	(D)	

=== Arizona – 16th district – Phoenix South – Guadalupe ===
Legisl.	Senator	P	Info	Representative 1	P	Info	Representative 2	P	Info
2003–2004	Linda Aguirre	(D)	15	Leah Landrum	(D)		Ben Miranda	(D)	
2005–2006	Linda Aguirre; Minority Leader	(D)	16	Leah Landrum Taylor	(D)	16	Ben R. Miranda	(D)	16
2007–2008	Leah Landrum Taylor	(D)	16	Ben R. Miranda	(D)	16	Cloves Campbell Jr.	(D)	16
2009–2010	Leah Landrum Taylor	(D)	16	Ben R. Miranda	(D)	16	Cloves Campbell Jr.	(D)	16
2011–2012	Leah Landrum Taylor	(D)	16	Catherine Miranda	(D)	16	Ruben Gallego	(D)	16

=== Arizona – 17th district – Phoenix South-East – Tempe ===
Legisl.	Senator	P	Info	Representative 1	P	Info	Representative 2	P	Info
2003–2004	Harry Mitchell	(D)		Meg Burton Cahill	(D)		Mark Thompson	(R)	
2005–2006	Harry E. Mitchell; Ed Ableser	(D)	17	Meg Burton Cahill	(D)		Laura Knaperek	(R)	
2007–2008	Meg Burton Cahill	(D)	17	David Schapira	(D)		Ed Ableser	(D)	
2009–2010	Meg Burton Cahill	(D)	17	David Schapira	(D)		Ed Ableser	(D)	
2011–2012	David Schapira	(D)		Ed Ableser	(D)		P. Ben Arredondo	(D)	

=== Arizona – 18th district – Mesa West (South-East outside Phoenix) ===
Legisl.	Senator	P	Info	Representative 1	P	Info	Representative 2	P	Info
2003–2004	Mark Anderson	(R)		Russell Pearce	(R)		Karen Johnson	(R)	
2005–2006	Karen Johnson	(R)	18	Russell Pearce	(R)	18	Mark Anderson	(R)	
2007–2008	Karen Johnson	(R)	18	Russell Pearce	(R)	18	Mark Anderson	(R)	
2009–2010	Russell Pearce	(R)		Cecil Ash	(R)		Steve Court	(R)	
2011–2012	Russell Pearce	(R)		Cecil Ash	(R)		Steve Court	(R)	

=== Arizona – 19th district – Mesa East (South-East outside Phoenix) ===
Legisl.	Senator	P	Info	Representative 1	P	Info	Representative 2	P	Info
2003–2004	Marilyn Jarrett	(R)		Chuck Gray	(R)		Gary Pierce	(R)	
2005–2006	Marilyn Jarrett; Chuck Gray	(R)	19 05 – 03/06	Chuck Gray	(R)	19	Gary Pierce	(R)	
2007–2008	Chuck Gray	(R)	19	Kirk Adams	(R)		Rich Crandall	(R)	
2009–2010	Chuck Gray	(R)	19	Kirk Adams	(R)		Rich Crandall	(R)	
2011–2012	Rich Crandall	(R)		Kirk Adams	(R)		Justin Olson	(R)	

=== Arizona – 20th district – Phoenix South – Chandler West ===
Legisl.	Senator	P	Info	Representative 1	P	Info	Representative 2	P	Info
2003–2004	Slade Mead	(R)		John Huppenthal	(R)		Bob Robson	(R)	
2005–2006	John Huppenthal	(R)	20	Anton Orlich	(R)		Bob Robson	(R)	
2007–2008	John Huppenthal; Majority Whip	(R)	20	Bob Robson	(R)		John McComish	(R)	
2009–2010	John Huppenthal	(R)		John McComish	(R)		Rae Waters	(D)	
2011–2012	John McComish	(R)		Jeff Dial	(R)		Bob Robson	(R)	

=== Arizona – 21st district – Chandler – Queen Creek (South-East Phoenix) ===
Legisl.	Senator	P	Info	Representative 1	P	Info	Representative 2	P	Info
2003–2004	Jay Tibshraeny	(R)		Steven B. Yarbrough	(R)		Warde Nichols	(R)	
2005–2006	Jay Tibshraeny; Majority Whip	(R)	21	Steven B. Yarbrough	(R)		Warde Nichols	(R)	
2007–2008	Jay Tibshraeny	(R)	21	Steven B. Yarbrough	(R)		Warde Nichols	(R)	
2009–2010	Jay Tibshraeny	(R)		Steven B. Yarbrough	(R)		Warde Nichols	(R)	
2011–2012	Steven B. Yarbrough	(R)		Tom Forese	(R)		J.D. Mesnard	(R)	

=== Arizona – 22nd district – Gilbert – Mesa South – Gold Camp ===
Legisl.	Senator	P	Info	Representative 1	P	Info	Representative 2	P	Info
2003–2004	Thayer Verschoor	(R)		Andy Biggs	(R)		Eddie Farnsworth	(R)	
2005–2006	Thayer Verschoor	(R)	22	Andy Biggs	(R)		Eddie Farnsworth	(R)	
2007–2008	Thayer Verschoor; Majority Leader	(R)	22	Andy Biggs	(R)		Eddie Farnsworth	(R)	
2009–2010	Thayer Verschoor	(R)		Andy Biggs	(R)		Laurin Hendrix	(R)	
2011–2012	Andy Biggs	(R)		Eddie Farnsworth	(R)		Steve Urie	(R)	

=== Arizona – 23rd district – Pinal County ===
Legisl.	Senator	P	Info	Representative 1	P	Info	Representative 2	P	Info
2003–2004	Pete Rios	(D)		Ernest Bustamante	(D)		Cheryl Chase	(D)	
2005–2006	Rebecca Rios	(D)	23	Pete Rios	(D)		Cheryl Chase	(D)	
2007–2008	Rebecca Rios; Minority Whip	(D)	23	Barbara McGuire	(D)		Pete Rios	(D)	
2009–2010	Rebecca Rios	(D)	23	Barbara McGuire	(D)		Frank Pratt	(R)	
2011–2012	Steve Smith	(R)		John Fillmore	(R)		Frank Pratt	(R)	

=== Arizona – 24th district – Yuma County – La Paz County South ===
Legisl.	Senator	P	Info	Representative 1	P	Info	Representative 2	P	Info
2003–2004	Herb Guenther	(D)		Robert Cannell	(D)		James R. Carruthers	(R)	
2005–2006	Robert Cannell	(D)	24	Amanda Aguirre	(D)	24-1	Russell L. Jones	(R)	22
2007–2008	Amanda Aguirre	(D)	24	Lynne Pancrazi	(D)		Theresa Ulmer	(D)	
2009–2010	Amanda Aguirre	(D)		Lynne Pancrazi	(D)		Russ Jones	(R)	
2011–2012	Don Shooter	(R)		Lynne Pancrazi	(D)		Russ Jones	(R)	22

=== Arizona – 25th district – Pima County West – Cochise County ===
Legisl.	Senator	P	Info	Representative 1	P	Info	Representative 2	P	Info
2003–2004	Marsha Arzberger	(D)		Manuel V. Alvarez	(D)		Jennifer J. Burns	(R)	
2005–2006	Marsha Arzberger	(D)	25	Manuel V. Alvarez	(D)		Jennifer J. Burns	(R)	
2007–2008	Marsha Arzberger; Minority Leader	(D)	25	Manuel V. Alvarez	(D)		Jennifer J. Burns	(R)	
2009–2010	Marsha Arzberger; Minority Leader	(D)	25	Patricia Fleming	(D)		David Stevens	(R)	
2011–2012	Gail Griffin	(R)		Peggy Judd	(R)		David Stevens	(R)	

=== Arizona – 26th district – Oro Valley – Catalina (Tucson North) ===
Legisl.	Senator	P	Info	Representative 1	P	Info	Representative 2	P	Info
2003–2004	Toni Hellon	(R)		Pete Hershberger	(R)		Steve Huffman	(R)	
2005–2006	Toni Hellon	(R)	26	Pete Hershberger	(R)		Steve Huffman	(R)	
2007–2008	Charlene Pesquiera	(D)	26	Pete Hershberger	(R)		Lena S. Saradnik	(D)	
2009–2010	Al Melvin (politician)	(R)		Nancy Young Wright	(D)		Vic Williams	(R)	
2011–2012	Al Melvin (politician)	(R)		Terri Proud	(R)		Vic Williams	(R)	

=== Arizona – 27th district – Tucson West – Three Points ===
Legisl.	Senator	P	Info	Representative 1	P	Info	Representative 2	P	Info
2003–2004	Jorge Luis Garcia; Minority Whip	(D)	27	Phil Lopes	(D)		Olivia Cajero Bedford	(D)	
2005–2006	Jorge Luis Garcia; Minority Whip	(D)	27	Phil Lopes	(D)		Olivia Cajero Bedford	(D)	
2007–2008	Jorge Luis Garcia; Assistant Minority Leader	(D)	27	Phil Lopes	(D)		Olivia Cajero Bedford	(D)	
2009–2010	Jorge Luis Garcia	(D)		Phil Lopes	(D)		Olivia Cajero Bedford	(D)	
2011–2012	Olivia Cajero Bedford	(D)		Sally Ann Gonzales	(D)		Macario Saldate	(D)	

=== Arizona – 28th district – Tucson North ===
Legisl.	Senator	P	Info	Representative 1	P	Info	Representative 2	P	Info
2003–2004	Gabby Giffords	(D)		David Bradley	(D)		Ted Downing	(D)	
2005–2006	Gabby Giffords (2005); Paula Aboud (2005–2006)	(D)	28	David Bradley	(D)		Ted Downing	(D)	
2007–2008	Paula Aboud	(D)	28	David Bradley	(D)		Steve Farley	(D)	
2009–2010	Paula Aboud	(D)	28	David Bradley	(D)		Steve Farley	(D)	
2011–2012	Paula Aboud	(D)	28	Bruce Wheeler	(D)		Steve Farley	(D)	

=== Arizona – 29th district – Tucson ===
Legisl.	Senator	P	Info	Representative 1	P	Info	Representative 2	P	Info
2003–2004	Ramon Valadez	(D)		Victor Soltero	(D)		Linda Lopez	(D)	
2005–2006	Victor Soltero	(D)	29	Tom Prezelski	(D)		Linda Lopez	(D)	
2007–2008	Victor Soltero	(D)	29	Tom Prezelski	(D)		Linda Lopez	(D)	
2009–2010	Linda Lopez	(D)		Matt Heinz	(D)		Daniel Patterson	(D)	
2011–2012	Linda Lopez	(D)		Matt Heinz	(D)		Daniel Patterson	(D)	

=== Arizona – 30th district – Green Valley (Tucson Sth et East) ===
Legisl.	Senator	P	Info	Representative 1	P	Info	Representative 2	P	Info
2003–2004	Timothy Bee	(R)	30	Randy Graf	(R)		Marian McClure	(R)	
2005–2006	Timothy Bee; Majority Leader	(R)	30	Jonathan Paton	(R)		Marian McClure	(R)	
2007–2008	Timothy Bee; President of Senate	(R)	30	Jonathan Paton	(R)		Marian McClure	(R)	
2009–2010	Jonathan Paton (2009–2010); Frank Antenori (2010)	(R)		David Gowan	(R)		Frank Antenori (2009–2010); Ted Vogt (2010)	(R)	
2011–2012	Frank Antenori	(R)		David Gowan	(R)		Ted Vogt	(R)	
