= 2010 Arizona Senate election =

- November 2, 2010

All 30 seats of the Arizona Senate 16 seats needed for a majority
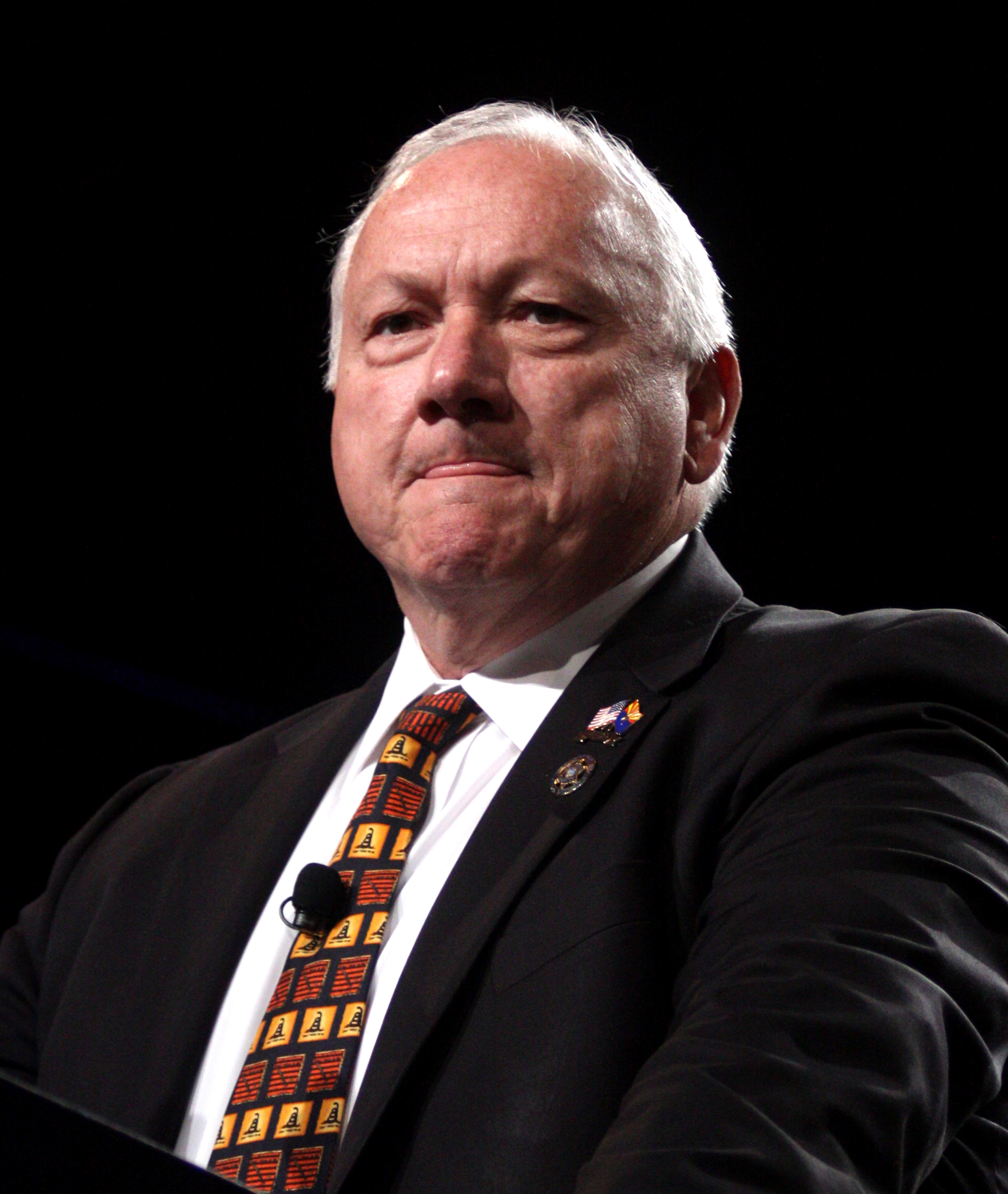

	Majority party	Minority party
Leader	Russell Pearce	David Schapira
Party	Republican	Democratic
Leader's seat	18th	17th
Seats before	18	12
Seats after	21	9
Seat change	▲3	▼3
- Results: Democratic hold Republican hold Republican gain
Senate President before election
Robert "Bob" Burns
Republican
Elected Senate President
Russell Pearce (Jan. 10, 2011 - Nov. 8, 2011)
Steve Pierce (Nov. 10, 2011 - Jan. 1, 2013)
Republican

The 2010 Arizona Senate election was held on November 2, 2010. Voters elected members of the Arizona Senate in all 30 of the state's legislative districts to serve a two-year term. Primary elections were held on August 24, 2010.

Prior to the elections, the Republicans held a majority of 18 seats over the Democrats' 12 seats.

Following the election, Republicans maintained control of the chamber with 21 Republicans to nine Democrats, a net gain of three seats for Republicans.

The newly elected senators served in the 50th Arizona State Legislature.

== Retiring Incumbents ==
=== Democrats ===
1. District 2: Albert Hale
2. District 13: Richard Miranda
3. District 14: Debbie McCune-Davis
4. District 15: Ken Cheuvront
5. District 17: Meg Burton-Cahill
6. District 27: Jorge Luis Garcia (Maria Garcia appointed after his death)

=== Republicans ===
1. District 4: Jack W. Harper
2. District 6: Pamela Gorman
3. District 7: Jim Waring
4. District 8: Carolyn S. Allen
5. District 9: Robert "Bob" Burns
6. District 11: Barbara Leff
7. District 19: Chuck Gray
8. District 20: John Huppenthal
9. District 21: Jay Tibshraeny
10. District 22: Thayer Verschoor
11. District 30: Jonathan Paton

== Incumbents defeated in general elections ==
=== Democrats ===
1. District 23: Rebecca Rios
2. District 24: Amanda Aguirre
3. District 25: Manuel V. "Manny" Alvarez

== Predictions ==
Source	Ranking	As of
Governing	Safe R	November 1, 2010

== Summary of results by Arizona State legislative district ==
District	Incumbent	Party	Elected senator	Outcome
1st	Steve Pierce	Rep	Steve Pierce	Rep hold
2nd	Albert Hale	Dem	Jack C. Jackson Jr.	Dem hold
3rd	Ron Gould	Rep	Ron Gould	Rep hold
4th	Jack W. Harper	Rep	Scott Bundgaard (Note: Republican Judy Burges was sworn in January 23, 2012 to replace Republican Senator Scott Bundgaard who resigned on January 6, 2012.)	Rep hold
5th	Sylvia Tenney Allen	Rep	Sylvia Tenney Allen	Rep hold
6th	Pamela Gorman	Rep	Lori Klein	Rep hold
7th	Jim Waring	Rep	Nancy Barto	Rep hold
8th	Carolyn S. Allen	Rep	Michele Reagan	Rep hold
9th	Robert "Bob" Burns	Rep	Rick Murphy	Rep hold
10th	Linda Gray	Rep	Linda Gray	Rep hold
11th	Barbara Leff	Rep	Adam Driggs	Rep hold
12th	John Nelson	Rep	John Nelson	Rep hold
13th	Richard Miranda	Dem	Steve Gallardo	Dem hold
14th	Debbie McCune-Davis	Dem	Robert Meza	Dem hold
15th	Ken Cheuvront	Dem	Kyrsten Sinema (Note: Democrat David Lujan was sworn in January 12, 2012 to replace Democratic Senator Kyrsten Sinema who resigned on January 3, 2012.)	Dem hold
16th	Leah Landrum	Dem	Leah Landrum	Dem hold
17th	Meg Burton-Cahill	Dem	David Schapira	Dem hold
18th	Russell Pearce	Rep	Russell Pearce (Note: Republican Jerry Lewis was elected in a Special Recall Election held November 8, 2011 and sworn in as Senator on November 22, 2011 after successfully defeating recalled incumbent Republican Senator Russell Pearce.)	Rep hold
19th	Chuck Gray	Rep	Rich Crandall	Rep hold
20th	John Huppenthal	Rep	John McComish	Rep hold
21st	Jay Tibshraeny	Rep	Steve Yarbrough	Rep hold
22nd	Thayer Verschoor	Rep	Andy Biggs	Rep hold
23rd	Rebecca Rios	Dem	Steve Smith	Rep gain
24th	Amanda Aguirre	Dem	Don Shooter	Rep gain
25th	Manuel V. "Manny" Alvarez	Dem	Gail Griffin	Rep gain
26th	Al Melvin	Rep	Al Melvin	Rep hold
27th	Jorge Luis Garcia	Dem	Olivia Cajero Bedford	Dem hold
28th	Paula Aboud	Dem	Paula Aboud	Dem hold
29th	Linda Lopez	Dem	Linda Lopez	Dem hold
30th	Jonathan Paton	Rep	Frank Antenori	Rep hold

== Detailed results ==
=== District 1 ===
Democratic primary results
Party	Candidate	Votes	%
Democratic	Bob Donahue	10,398	100.00%
Total votes		10,398	100.00%

Republican primary results
Party	Candidate	Votes	%
Republican	Steve Pierce (incumbent)	29,204	100.00%
Total votes		29,204	100.00%

General election results
Party	Candidate	Votes	%
Republican	Steve Pierce (incumbent)	52,458	64.83%
Democratic	Bob Donahue	28,463	35.17%
Total votes		80,921	100.00%
Republican hold			

=== District 2 ===
Democratic primary results
Party	Candidate	Votes	%
Democratic	Jack C. Jackson Jr.	6,672	36.75%
Democratic	Sylvia Laughter	5,766	31.76%
Democratic	Kee Allen Begay Jr.	3,839	21.15%
Democratic	Gloria Hale-Showalter	1,877	10.34%
Total votes		18,154	100.00%

General election results
Party	Candidate	Votes	%
Democratic	Jack C. Jackson Jr.	37,722	100.00%
Total votes		37,722	100.00%
Democratic hold			

=== District 3 ===
Democratic primary results
Party	Candidate	Votes	%
Democratic	Beth Weisser	4,694	100.00%
Total votes		4,694	100.00%

Republican primary results
Party	Candidate	Votes	%
Republican	Ron Gould (incumbent)	18,621	100.00%
Total votes		18,621	100.00%

General election results
Party	Candidate	Votes	%
Republican	Ron Gould (incumbent)	40,777	71.73%
Democratic	Beth Weisser	16,073	28.27%
Total votes		56,850	100.00%
Republican hold			

=== District 4 ===
Democratic primary results
Party	Candidate	Votes	%
Democratic	Sue Dolphin	11,926	100.00%
Total votes		11,926	100.00%

Republican primary results
Party	Candidate	Votes	%
Republican	Scott Bundgaard	23,092	59.96%
Republican	Shawn Kohner	7,907	20.53%
Republican	Tony Bouie	7,516	19.51%
Total votes		38,515	100.00%

General election results
Party	Candidate	Votes	%
Republican	Scott Bundgaard	68,202	68.41%
Democratic	Sue Dolphin	31,500	31.59%
Total votes		99,702	100.00%
Republican hold			

=== District 5 ===
Democratic primary results
Party	Candidate	Votes	%
Democratic	Elaine Bohlmeyer	8,814	100.00%
Total votes		8,814	100.00%

Republican primary results
Party	Candidate	Votes	%
Republican	Sylvia Tenney Allen (incumbent)	12,091	55.39%
Republican	Bill Konopnicki	9,737	44.61%
Total votes		21,828	100.00%

General election results
Party	Candidate	Votes	%
Republican	Sylvia Tenney Allen (incumbent)	37,330	67.14%
Democratic	Elaine Bohlmeyer	18,270	32.86%
Total votes		55,600	100.00%
Republican hold			

=== District 6 ===
Democratic primary results
Party	Candidate	Votes	%
Democratic	Pat Flickner	6,697	100.00%
Total votes		6,697	100.00%

Republican primary results
Party	Candidate	Votes	%
Republican	Lori Klein	11,994	56.41%
Republican	David Braswell	9,268	43.59%
Total votes		21,262	100.00%

General election results
Party	Candidate	Votes	%
Republican	Lori Klein	38,999	67.02%
Democratic	Pat Flickner	19,190	32.98%
Total votes		58,189	100.00%
Republican hold			

=== District 7 ===
Democratic primary results
Party	Candidate	Votes	%
Democratic	Eric Shelley	6,723	100.00%
Total votes		6,723	100.00%

Republican primary results
Party	Candidate	Votes	%
Republican	Nancy Barto	10,475	46.16%
Republican	Ray Barnes	7,461	32.88%
Republican	Bob Green	3,254	14.34%
Republican	Brad Buch	1,503	6.62%
Total votes		22,693	100.00%

Libertarian primary results
Party	Candidate	Votes	%
Libertarian	Dennis G. Grenier (Note: Was a write-in candidate in the primary election.)	3	100.00%
Total votes		3	100.00%

General election results
Party	Candidate	Votes	%
Republican	Nancy Barto	41,849	67.18%
Democratic	Eric Shelley	20,441	32.82%
Total votes		62,290	100.00%
Republican hold			

=== District 8 ===
Democratic primary results
Party	Candidate	Votes	%
Democratic	Stuart Turnansky	7,773	100.00%
Total votes		7,773	100.00%

Republican primary results
Party	Candidate	Votes	%
Republican	Michele Reagan	26,177	100.00%
Total votes		26,177	100.00%

General election results
Party	Candidate	Votes	%
Republican	Michele Reagan	52,532	69.95%
Democratic	Stuart Turnansky	22,570	30.05%
Total votes		75,102	100.00%
Republican hold			

=== District 9 ===
Democratic primary results
Party	Candidate	Votes	%
Democratic	Sheri Van Horsen	8,807	100.00%
Total votes		8,807	100.00%

Republican primary results
Party	Candidate	Votes	%
Republican	Rick Murphy	19,171	100.00%
Total votes		19,171	100.00%

Libertarian primary results
Party	Candidate	Votes	%
Libertarian	Michael Patti	84	100.00%
Total votes		84	100.00%

General election results
Party	Candidate	Votes	%
Republican	Rick Murphy	32,895	58.71%
Democratic	Sheri Van Horsen	20,215	36.08%
Libertarian	Michael Patti	2,920	5.21%
Total votes		56,030	100.00%
Republican hold			

=== District 10 ===
Democratic primary results
Party	Candidate	Votes	%
Democratic	Justin Johnson	5,951	100.00%
Total votes		5,951	100.00%

Republican primary results
Party	Candidate	Votes	%
Republican	Linda Gray (incumbent)	11,356	100.00%
Total votes		11,356	100.00%

Green primary results
Party	Candidate	Votes	%
Green	Christopher Campbell	1	100.00%
Green	Gail Ginger	0	0.00%
Total votes		1	100.00%

General election results
Party	Candidate	Votes	%
Republican	Linda Gray (incumbent)	20,341	55.95%
Democratic	Justin Johnson	16,012	44.05%
Total votes		36,353	100.00%
Republican hold			

=== District 11 ===
Democratic primary results
Party	Candidate	Votes	%
Democratic	Rita Dickinson	10,409	100.00%
Total votes		10,409	100.00%

Republican primary results
Party	Candidate	Votes	%
Republican	Adam Driggs	11,816	48.24%
Republican	Rich Davis	9,835	40.15%
Republican	Andrew Smigielski	2,842	11.60%
Total votes		24,493	100.00%

General election results
Party	Candidate	Votes	%
Republican	Adam Driggs	37,458	58.19%
Democratic	Rita Dickinson	26,916	41.81%
Total votes		64,374	100.00%
Republican hold			

=== District 12 ===
Democratic primary results
Party	Candidate	Votes	%
Democratic	Tyler Kissell	9,860	100.00%
Total votes		9,860	100.00%

Republican primary results
Party	Candidate	Votes	%
Republican	John Nelson (incumbent)	12,336	56.44%
Republican	Clark Silver	5,641	25.81%
Republican	Eve Nunez	3,880	17.75%
Total votes		21,857	100.00%

Libertarian primary results
Party	Candidate	Votes	%
Libertarian	Michael White	111	100.00%
Total votes		111	100.00%

General election results
Party	Candidate	Votes	%
Republican	John Nelson (incumbent)	41,379	56.91%
Democratic	Tyler Kissell	27,559	37.90%
Libertarian	Michael White	3,769	5.18%
Total votes		72,707	100.00%
Republican hold			

=== District 13 ===
Democratic primary results
Party	Candidate	Votes	%
Democratic	Steve Gallardo	5,286	100.00%
Total votes		5,286	100.00%

General election results
Party	Candidate	Votes	%
Democratic	Steve Gallardo	17,087	100.00%
Total votes		17,087	100.00%
Democratic hold			

=== District 14 ===
Democratic primary results
Party	Candidate	Votes	%
Democratic	Robert Meza	4,155	100.00%
Total votes		4,155	100.00%

General election results
Party	Candidate	Votes	%
Democratic	Robert Meza	12,326	100.00%
Total votes		12,326	100.00%
Democratic hold			

=== District 15 ===
Democratic primary results
Party	Candidate	Votes	%
Democratic	Kyrsten Sinema	7,312	100.00%
Total votes		7,312	100.00%

Republican primary results
Party	Candidate	Votes	%
Republican	Bob Thomas	5,376	100.00%
Total votes		5,376	100.00%

General election results
Party	Candidate	Votes	%
Democratic	Kyrsten Sinema	18,013	62.82%
Republican	Bob Thomas	10,663	37.18%
Total votes		28,676	100.00%
Democratic hold			

=== District 16 ===
Democratic primary results
Party	Candidate	Votes	%
Democratic	Leah Landrum (incumbent)	5,655	57.41%
Democratic	Victor Jett Contreras	4,195	42.59%
Total votes		9,850	100.00%

General election results
Party	Candidate	Votes	%
Democratic	Leah Landrum (incumbent)	25,731	100.00%
Total votes		25,731	100.00%
Democratic hold			

=== District 17 ===
Democratic primary results
Party	Candidate	Votes	%
Democratic	David Schapira	7,829	100.00%
Total votes		7,829	100.00%

Republican primary results
Party	Candidate	Votes	%
Republican	Wendy Rogers	10,048	100.00%
Total votes		10,048	100.00%

Libertarian primary results
Party	Candidate	Votes	%
Libertarian	Garret Chartier-Dickie	102	100.00%
Total votes		102	100.00%

Green primary results
Party	Candidate	Votes	%
Green	Anthony "Grand Pa" Goshorn	4	100.00%
Total votes		4	100.00%

General election results
Party	Candidate	Votes	%
Democratic	David Schapira	21,783	51.05%
Republican	Wendy Rogers	18,827	44.12%
Libertarian	Garret Chartier-Dickie	1,277	2.99%
Green	Anthony "Grand Pa" Goshorn	784	1.84%
Total votes		42,671	100.00%
Democratic hold			

=== District 18 ===
Democratic primary results
Party	Candidate	Votes	%
Democratic	Andrew Sherwood	2,074	50.35%
Democratic	Robert Hernandez McDonald Jr.	2,045	49.65%
Total votes		4,119	100.00%

Republican primary results
Party	Candidate	Votes	%
Republican	Russell Pearce (incumbent)	10,636	100.00%
Total votes		10,636	100.00%

Libertarian primary results
Party	Candidate	Votes	%
Libertarian	Andrea Garcia	56	100.00%
Total votes		56	100.00%

General election results
Party	Candidate	Votes	%
Republican	Russell Pearce (incumbent)	17,552	56.58%
Democratic	Andrew Sherwood	10,663	34.37%
Libertarian	Andrea Garcia	2,808	9.05%
Total votes		31,023	100.00%
Republican hold			

=== District 19 ===
Republican primary results
Party	Candidate	Votes	%
Republican	Rich Crandall	14,499	59.70%
Republican	James Molina	9,787	40.30%
Total votes		24,286	100.00%

Libertarian primary results
Party	Candidate	Votes	%
Libertarian	William Munsil	17	100.00%
Total votes		17	100.00%

General election results
Party	Candidate	Votes	%
Republican	Rich Crandall	43,557	79.93%
Libertarian	William Munsil	10,935	20.07%
Total votes		54,492	100.00%
Republican hold			

=== District 20 ===
Republican primary results
Party	Candidate	Votes	%
Republican	John McComish	16,566	100.00%
Total votes		16,566	100.00%

General election results
Party	Candidate	Votes	%
Republican	John McComish	39,105	100.00%
Total votes		39,105	100.00%
Republican hold			

=== District 21 ===
Republican primary results
Party	Candidate	Votes	%
Republican	Steve Yarbrough	24,033	100.00%
Total votes		24,033	100.00%

General election results
Party	Candidate	Votes	%
Republican	Steve Yarbrough	54,339	100.00%
Total votes		54,339	100.00%
Republican hold			

=== District 22 ===
Republican primary results
Party	Candidate	Votes	%
Republican	Andy Biggs	25,792	100.00%
Total votes		25,792	100.00%

General election results
Party	Candidate	Votes	%
Republican	Andy Biggs	59,933	100.00%
Total votes		59,933	100.00%
Republican hold			

=== District 23 ===
Democratic primary results
Party	Candidate	Votes	%
Democratic	Rebecca Rios (incumbent)	11,434	100.00%
Total votes		11,434	100.00%

Republican primary results
Party	Candidate	Votes	%
Republican	Steve Smith	11,719	74.74%
Republican	Matt Byers	3,961	25.26%
Total votes		15,680	100.00%

Green primary results
Party	Candidate	Votes	%
Green	Matthew Shusta	5	100.00%
Total votes		5	100.00%

General election results
Party	Candidate	Votes	%
Republican	Steve Smith	34,568	53.24%
Democratic	Rebecca Rios (incumbent)	30,361	46.76%
Total votes		64,929	100.00%
Republican gain from Democratic			

=== District 24 ===
Democratic primary results
Party	Candidate	Votes	%
Democratic	Amanda Aguirre (incumbent)	6,178	100.00%
Total votes		6,178	100.00%

Republican primary results
Party	Candidate	Votes	%
Republican	Don Shooter	1,599	100.00%
Total votes		1,599	100.00%

Libertarian primary results
Party	Candidate	Votes	%
Libertarian	Jack Kretzer	38	100.00%
Total votes		38	100.00%

General election results
Party	Candidate	Votes	%
Republican	Don Shooter	18,334	50.95%
Democratic	Amanda Aguirre (incumbent)	16,140	44.85%
Libertarian	Jack Kretzer	1,510	4.20%
Total votes		35,984	100.00%
Republican gain from Democratic			

=== District 25 ===
Democratic primary results
Party	Candidate	Votes	%
Democratic	Manuel V. "Manny" Alvarez (incumbent)	10,956	100.00%
Total votes		10,956	100.00%

Republican primary results
Party	Candidate	Votes	%
Republican	Gail Griffin	9,551	63.01%
Republican	Craig Smith	5,608	36.99%
Total votes		15,159	100.00%

General election results
Party	Candidate	Votes	%
Republican	Gail Griffin	29,830	55.34%
Democratic	Manuel V. "Manny" Alvarez (incumbent)	24,074	44.66%
Total votes		53,904	100.00%
Republican gain from Democratic			

=== District 26 ===
Democratic primary results
Party	Candidate	Votes	%
Democratic	Cheryl Cage	14,239	100.00%
Total votes		14,239	100.00%

Republican primary results
Party	Candidate	Votes	%
Republican	Al Melvin (incumbent)	23,081	100.00%
Total votes		23,081	100.00%

General election results
Party	Candidate	Votes	%
Republican	Al Melvin (incumbent)	43,918	53.96%
Democratic	Cheryl Cage	37,477	46.04%
Total votes		81,395	100.00%
Republican hold			

=== District 27 ===
Democratic primary results
Party	Candidate	Votes	%
Democratic	Olivia Cajero Bedford	12,538	100.00%
Total votes		12,538	100.00%

General election results
Party	Candidate	Votes	%
Democratic	Olivia Cajero Bedford	33,456	99.68%
Independent	J. D. "Duke" Schechter (Note: Was a write-in candidate in the general election.)	91	0.27%
Independent	Jaime Vasquez	18	0.05%
Total votes		33,565	100.00%
Democratic hold			

=== District 28 ===
Democratic primary results
Party	Candidate	Votes	%
Democratic	Paula Aboud (incumbent)	14,916	100.00%
Total votes		14,916	100.00%

Republican primary results
Party	Candidate	Votes	%
Republican	Greg Krino	1,085	100.00%
Total votes		1,085	100.00%

General election results
Party	Candidate	Votes	%
Democratic	Paula Aboud (incumbent)	31,331	57.44%
Republican	Greg Krino	18,092	33.17%
Independent	Ted Downing	3,475	6.37%
Independent	Dave Ewoldt	1,645	3.02%
Total votes		54,543	100.00%
Democratic hold			

=== District 29 ===
Democratic primary results
Party	Candidate	Votes	%
Democratic	Linda Lopez (incumbent)	9,213	100.00%
Total votes		9,213	100.00%

General election results
Party	Candidate	Votes	%
Democratic	Linda Lopez (incumbent)	27,486	100.00%
Total votes		27,486	100.00%
Democratic hold			

=== District 30 ===
Democratic primary results
Party	Candidate	Votes	%
Democratic	Todd Camenisch	14,431	100.00%
Total votes		14,431	100.00%

Republican primary results
Party	Candidate	Votes	%
Republican	Frank Antenori	22,026	66.57%
Republican	Marian Ann McClure	11,059	33.43%
Total votes		33,085	100.00%

General election results
Party	Candidate	Votes	%
Republican	Frank Antenori	56,198	60.36%
Democratic	Todd Camenisch	36,911	39.64%
Total votes		93,109	100.00%
Republican hold			
