= 2008 Arizona Senate election =

- November 4, 2008

All 30 seats of the Arizona Senate 16 seats needed for a majority
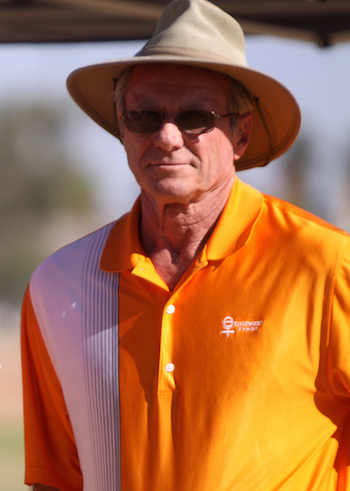

	Majority party	Minority party
Leader	Robert "Bob" Burns	Jorge Luis Garcia
Party	Republican	Democratic
Leader's seat	9th	27th
Seats before	17	13
Seats after	18	12
Seat change	▲1	▼1
- Results: Democratic hold Republican hold Republican gain
Senate President before election
Timothy S. Bee
Republican
Elected Senate President
Robert "Bob" Burns
Republican

The 2008 Arizona Senate election was held on November 4, 2008. Voters elected members of the Arizona Senate in all 30 of the state's legislative districts to serve a two-year term. Primary elections were held on September 2, 2008.

Prior to the elections, the Republicans held a majority of 17 seats over the Democrats' 13 seats.

Following the election, Republicans maintained control of the chamber with 18 Republicans to 12 Democrats, a net gain of one seat for Republicans.

The newly elected senators served in the 49th Arizona State Legislature.

== Retiring Incumbents ==
=== Democrats ===
1. District 25: Marsha Arzberger
2. District 26: Charlene Pesquiera
3. District 29: Victor Soltero

=== Republicans ===
1. District 5: Jake Flake
2. District 12: Robert Blendu
3. District 18: Karen S. Johnson
4. District 30: Tim Bee

== Incumbent Defeated in Primary Election ==
=== Republican ===
1. District 1: Tom O'Halleran

== Predictions ==
Source	Ranking	As of
Stateline	Lean R	October 15, 2008

== Summary of Results by Arizona State Legislative District ==
District	Incumbent	Party	Elected Senator	Outcome
1st	Tom O'Halleran	Rep	Steve Pierce	Rep Hold
2nd	Albert Hale	Dem	Albert Hale	Dem Hold
3rd	Ron Gould	Rep	Ron Gould	Rep Hold
4th	Jack Harper	Rep	Jack Harper	Rep Hold
5th	Jake Flake	Rep	Sylvia Tenney Allen	Rep Hold
6th	Pamela Gorman	Rep	Pamela Gorman	Rep Hold
7th	Jim Waring	Rep	Jim Waring	Rep Hold
8th	Carolyn S. Allen	Rep	Carolyn S. Allen	Rep Hold
9th	Robert "Bob" Burns	Rep	Robert "Bob" Burns	Rep Hold
10th	Linda Gray	Rep	Linda Gray	Rep Hold
11th	Barbara Leff	Rep	Barbara Leff	Rep Hold
12th	Robert Blendu	Rep	John Nelson	Rep Hold
13th	Richard Miranda	Dem	Richard Miranda	Dem Hold
14th	Debbie McCune-Davis	Dem	Debbie McCune-Davis	Dem Hold
15th	Ken Cheuvront	Dem	Ken Cheuvront	Dem Hold
16th	Leah Landrum	Dem	Leah Landrum	Dem Hold
17th	Meg Burton-Cahill	Dem	Meg Burton-Cahill	Dem Hold
18th	Karen S. Johnson	Rep	Russell Pearce	Rep Hold
19th	Chuck Gray	Rep	Chuck Gray	Rep Hold
20th	John Huppenthal	Rep	John Huppenthal	Rep Hold
21st	Jay Tibshraeny	Rep	Jay Tibshraeny	Rep Hold
22nd	Thayer Verschoor	Rep	Thayer Verschoor	Rep Hold
23rd	Rebecca Rios	Dem	Rebecca Rios	Dem Hold
24th	Amanda Aguirre	Dem	Amanda Aguirre	Dem Hold
25th	Marsha Arzberger	Dem	Manuel V. "Manny" Alvarez	Dem Hold
26th	Charlene Pesquiera	Dem	Al Melvin	Rep Gain
27th	Jorge Luis Garcia	Dem	Jorge Luis Garcia	Dem Hold
28th	Paula Aboud	Dem	Paula Aboud	Dem Hold
29th	Victor Soltero	Dem	Linda Lopez	Dem Hold
30th	Tim Bee	Rep	Jonathan Paton	Rep Hold

== Detailed Results ==
=== District 1 ===
Democratic primary results
Party	Candidate	Votes	%
Democratic	Pat Chancerelle (Note: Was a write-in candidate in the primary election.)	1,037	100.00%
Total votes		1,037	100.00%

Republican primary results
Party	Candidate	Votes	%
Republican	Steve Pierce	13,757	52.70%
Republican	Tom O'Halleran (incumbent)	12,349	47.30%
Total votes		26,106	100.00%

General election results
Party	Candidate	Votes	%
Republican	Steve Pierce	58,612	60.98%
Democratic	Pat Chancerelle	37,512	39.02%
Total votes		96,124	100.00%
Republican hold			

=== District 2 ===
Democratic primary results
Party	Candidate	Votes	%
Democratic	Albert Hale (incumbent)	17,577	100.00%
Total votes		17,577	100.00%

Republican primary results
Party	Candidate	Votes	%
Republican	Royce Jenkins	2,823	100.00%
Total votes		2,823	100.00%

General election results
Party	Candidate	Votes	%
Democratic	Albert Hale (incumbent)	42,241	72.91%
Republican	Royce Jenkins	15,693	27.09%
Total votes		57,934	100.00%
Democratic hold			

=== District 3 ===
Democratic primary results
Party	Candidate	Votes	%
Democratic	Mary Landahl	4,485	100.00%
Total votes		4,485	100.00%

Republican primary results
Party	Candidate	Votes	%
Republican	Ron Gould (incumbent)	11,967	100.00%
Total votes		11,967	100.00%

General election results
Party	Candidate	Votes	%
Republican	Ron Gould (incumbent)	42,730	62.63%
Democratic	Mary Landahl	25,499	37.37%
Total votes		68,229	100.00%
Republican hold			

=== District 4 ===
Democratic primary results
Party	Candidate	Votes	%
Democratic	Robert Boehlke	10,275	100.00%
Total votes		10,275	100.00%

Republican primary results
Party	Candidate	Votes	%
Republican	Jack Harper (incumbent)	17,974	69.35%
Republican	John B. Zerby	7,944	30.65%
Total votes		25,918	100.00%

General election results
Party	Candidate	Votes	%
Republican	Jack Harper (incumbent)	73,097	60.67%
Democratic	Robert Boehlke	47,394	39.33%
Total votes		120,491	100.00%
Republican hold			

=== District 5 ===
Democratic primary results
Party	Candidate	Votes	%
Democratic	Bill Jeffers	2,486	100.00%
Total votes		2,486	100.00%

Republican primary results
Party	Candidate	Votes	%
Republican	Sylvia Tenney Allen	10,205	100.00%
Total votes		10,205	100.00%

General election results
Party	Candidate	Votes	%
Republican	Sylvia Tenney Allen	36,347	54.48%
Democratic	Bill Jeffers	30,365	45.52%
Total votes		66,712	100.00%
Republican hold			

=== District 6 ===
Democratic primary results
Party	Candidate	Votes	%
Democratic	Jim Larson	5,570	100.00%
Total votes		5,570	100.00%

Republican primary results
Party	Candidate	Votes	%
Republican	Pamela Gorman (incumbent)	11,755	100.00%
Total votes		11,755	100.00%

General election results
Party	Candidate	Votes	%
Republican	Pamela Gorman (incumbent)	47,116	59.87%
Democratic	Jim Larson	31,579	40.13%
Total votes		78,695	100.00%
Republican hold			

=== District 7 ===
Democratic primary results
Party	Candidate	Votes	%
Democratic	Lisa Black	5,580	100.00%
Total votes		5,580	100.00%

Republican primary results
Party	Candidate	Votes	%
Republican	Jim Waring (incumbent)	12,584	100.00%
Total votes		12,584	100.00%

Libertarian Primary Results
Party	Candidate	Votes	%
Libertarian	Dennis G. Grenier	56	100.00%
Total votes		56	100.00%

General election results
Party	Candidate	Votes	%
Republican	Jim Waring (incumbent)	46,673	57.82%
Democratic	Lisa Black	31,583	39.13%
Libertarian	Dennis G. Grenier	2,465	3.05%
Total votes		80,721	100.00%
Republican hold			

=== District 8 ===
Republican primary results
Party	Candidate	Votes	%
Republican	Carolyn S. Allen (incumbent)	17,687	100.00%
Total votes		17,687	100.00%

General election results
Party	Candidate	Votes	%
Republican	Carolyn S. Allen (incumbent)	71,125	100.00%
Total votes		71,125	100.00%
Republican hold			

=== District 9 ===
Democratic primary results
Party	Candidate	Votes	%
Democratic	Karen Price	7,211	100.00%
Total votes		7,718	100.00%

Republican primary results
Party	Candidate	Votes	%
Republican	Robert "Bob" Burns (incumbent)	12,967	100.00%
Total votes		12,967	100.00%

General election results
Party	Candidate	Votes	%
Republican	Robert "Bob" Burns (incumbent)	40,214	55.51%
Democratic	Karen Price	32,236	44.49%
Total votes		72,450	100.00%
Republican hold			

=== District 10 ===
Democratic primary results
Party	Candidate	Votes	%
Democratic	Martin Monroe	4,931	100.00%
Total votes		4,931	100.00%

Republican primary results
Party	Candidate	Votes	%
Republican	Linda Gray (incumbent)	7,472	100.00%
Total votes		7,472	100.00%

General election results
Party	Candidate	Votes	%
Republican	Linda Gray (incumbent)	27,445	55.26%
Democratic	Martin Monroe	22,218	44.74%
Total votes		49,663	100.00%
Republican hold			

=== District 11 ===
Democratic primary results
Party	Candidate	Votes	%
Democratic	Ann Wallack	8,665	100.00%
Total votes		8,665	100.00%

Republican primary results
Party	Candidate	Votes	%
Republican	Barbara Leff (incumbent)	13,827	100.00%
Total votes		13,827	100.00%

General election results
Party	Candidate	Votes	%
Republican	Barbara Leff (incumbent)	43,702	54.57%
Democratic	Ann Wallack	36,376	45.43%
Total votes		80,078	100.00%
Republican hold			

=== District 12 ===
Democratic primary results
Party	Candidate	Votes	%
Democratic	Angela Cotera	7,123	100.00%
Total votes		7,123	100.00%

Republican primary results
Party	Candidate	Votes	%
Republican	John Nelson	12,058	100.00%
Total votes		12,058	100.00%

General election results
Party	Candidate	Votes	%
Republican	John Nelson	52,552	52.49%
Democratic	Angela Cotera	47,562	47.51%
Total votes		100,114	100.00%
Republican hold			

=== District 13 ===
Democratic primary results
Party	Candidate	Votes	%
Democratic	Richard Miranda (incumbent)	3,772	100.00%
Total votes		3,772	100.00%

General election results
Party	Candidate	Votes	%
Democratic	Richard Miranda (incumbent)	23,816	100.00%
Total votes		23,816	100.00%
Democratic hold			

=== District 14 ===
Democratic primary results
Party	Candidate	Votes	%
Democratic	Debbie McCune-Davis (incumbent)	3,471	100.00%
Total votes		3,471	100.00%

Libertarian Primary Results
Party	Candidate	Votes	%
Libertarian	Mike Renzulli	5	100.00%
Total votes		5	100.00%

General election results
Party	Candidate	Votes	%
Democratic	Debbie McCune-Davis (incumbent)	16,033	82.45%
Libertarian	Mike Renzulli	3,391	17.44%
Independent	C.J. Becker (Note: Was a write-in candidate in the general election.)	22	0.11%
Total votes		19,446	100.00%
Democratic hold			

=== District 15 ===
Democratic primary results
Party	Candidate	Votes	%
Democratic	Ken Cheuvront (incumbent)	5,670	100.00%
Total votes		5,670	100.00%

General election results
Party	Candidate	Votes	%
Democratic	Ken Cheuvront (incumbent)	30,321	100.00%
Total votes		30,321	100.00%
Democratic hold			

=== District 16 ===
Democratic primary results
Party	Candidate	Votes	%
Democratic	Leah Landrum (incumbent)	6,184	100.00%
Total votes		6,184	100.00%

Republican primary results
Party	Candidate	Votes	%
Republican	Daniel J. Veres	1,914	100.00%
Total votes		1,914	100.00%

General election results
Party	Candidate	Votes	%
Democratic	Leah Landrum (incumbent)	33,368	73.31%
Republican	Daniel J. Veres	12,149	26.69%
Total votes		45,517	100.00%
Democratic hold			

=== District 17 ===
Democratic primary results
Party	Candidate	Votes	%
Democratic	Meg Burton-Cahill (incumbent)	6,406	100.00%
Total votes		6,406	100.00%

Republican primary results
Party	Candidate	Votes	%
Republican	Jesse Hernandez	6,486	100.00%
Total votes		6,486	100.00%

General election results
Party	Candidate	Votes	%
Democratic	Meg Burton-Cahill (incumbent)	35,720	61.56%
Republican	Jesse Hernandez	22,303	38.44%
Total votes		58,023	100.00%
Democratic hold			

=== District 18 ===
Democratic primary results
Party	Candidate	Votes	%
Democratic	Judah Nativio	2,841	100.00%
Total votes		2,841	100.00%

Republican primary results
Party	Candidate	Votes	%
Republican	Russell Pearce	6,604	69.09%
Republican	Kevin Gibbons	2,954	30.91%
Total votes		9,558	100.00%

General election results
Party	Candidate	Votes	%
Republican	Russell Pearce	24,232	56.19%
Democratic	Judah Nativio	18,889	43.80%
Independent	Ilias Kostopoulos	2	0.00%
Total votes		43,123	100.00%
Republican hold			

=== District 19 ===
Republican primary results
Party	Candidate	Votes	%
Republican	Chuck Gray (incumbent)	13,245	100.00%
Total votes		13,245	100.00%

General election results
Party	Candidate	Votes	%
Republican	Chuck Gray (incumbent)	58,870	100.00%
Total votes		58,870	100.00%
Republican hold			

=== District 20 ===
Democratic primary results
Party	Candidate	Votes	%
Democratic	Ted Maish	5,876	100.00%
Total votes		5,876	100.00%

Republican primary results
Party	Candidate	Votes	%
Republican	John Huppenthal (incumbent)	11,215	100.00%
Total votes		11,215	100.00%

General election results
Party	Candidate	Votes	%
Republican	John Huppenthal (incumbent)	44,245	56.24%
Democratic	Ted Maish	34,426	43.76%
Total votes		78,671	100.00%
Republican hold			

=== District 21 ===
Republican primary results
Party	Candidate	Votes	%
Republican	Jay Tibshraeny (incumbent)	14,001	100.00%
Total votes		14,001	100.00%

General election results
Party	Candidate	Votes	%
Republican	Jay Tibshraeny (incumbent)	77,426	100.00%
Total votes		77,426	100.00%
Republican hold			

=== District 22 ===
Republican primary results
Party	Candidate	Votes	%
Republican	Thayer Verschoor (incumbent)	7,167	42.32%
Republican	Eddie Farnsworth	6,593	38.93%
Republican	Joe Bedgood	3,176	18.75%
Total votes		16,936	100.00%

General election results
Party	Candidate	Votes	%
Republican	Thayer Verschoor (incumbent)	81,332	100.00%
Total votes		81,332	100.00%
Republican hold			

=== District 23 ===
Democratic primary results
Party	Candidate	Votes	%
Democratic	Rebecca Rios (incumbent)	10,260	100.00%
Total votes		10,260	100.00%

Republican primary results
Party	Candidate	Votes	%
Republican	André Campos	6,737	100.00%
Total votes		6,737	100.00%

General election results
Party	Candidate	Votes	%
Democratic	Rebecca Rios (incumbent)	48,203	56.73%
Republican	André Campos	36,772	43.27%
Total votes		84,975	100.00%
Democratic hold			

=== District 24 ===
Democratic primary results
Party	Candidate	Votes	%
Democratic	Amanda Aguirre (incumbent)	6,016	100.00%
Total votes		6,016	100.00%

Green Primary Results
Party	Candidate	Votes	%
Green	Jack Kretzer	38	100.00%
Total votes		38	100.00%

General election results
Party	Candidate	Votes	%
Democratic	Amanda Aguirre (incumbent)	29,718	76.43%
Green	Jack Kretzer	9,167	23.57%
Total votes		38,885	100.00%
Democratic hold			

=== District 25 ===
Democratic primary results
Party	Candidate	Votes	%
Democratic	Manuel V. "Manny" Alvarez	10,282	100.00%
Total votes		10,282	100.00%

Republican primary results
Party	Candidate	Votes	%
Republican	Mary Ann Black	7,568	100.00%
Total votes		7,568	100.00%

General election results
Party	Candidate	Votes	%
Democratic	Manuel V. "Manny" Alvarez	34,269	52.74%
Republican	Mary Ann Black	30,703	47.26%
Total votes		64,972	100.00%
Democratic hold			

=== District 26 ===
Democratic primary results
Party	Candidate	Votes	%
Democratic	Cheryl A. Cage	11,375	100.00%
Total votes		11,375	100.00%

Republican primary results
Party	Candidate	Votes	%
Republican	Al Melvin	10,131	53.35%
Republican	Pete Hershberger	8,857	46.65%
Total votes		18,988	100.00%

General election results
Party	Candidate	Votes	%
Republican	Al Melvin	48,191	51.04%
Democratic	Cheryl A. Cage	46,225	48.96%
Total votes		94,416	100.00%
Republican gain from Democratic			

=== District 27 ===
Democratic primary results
Party	Candidate	Votes	%
Democratic	Jorge Luis Garcia (incumbent)	9,788	100.00%
Total votes		9,788	100.00%

Republican primary results
Party	Candidate	Votes	%
Republican	Bob Westerman	3,859	100.00%
Total votes		3,859	100.00%

General election results
Party	Candidate	Votes	%
Democratic	Jorge Luis Garcia (incumbent)	38,480	67.24%
Republican	Bob Westerman	18,749	32.76%
Total votes		57,229	100.00%
Democratic hold			

=== District 28 ===
Democratic primary results
Party	Candidate	Votes	%
Democratic	Paula Aboud (incumbent)	11,687	100.00%
Total votes		11,687	100.00%

Republican primary results
Party	Candidate	Votes	%
Republican	(John) Michael Steimer	19	100.00%
Total votes		19	100.00%

General election results
Party	Candidate	Votes	%
Democratic	Paula Aboud (incumbent)	53,343	100.00%
Total votes		53,343	100.00%
Democratic hold			

=== District 29 ===
Democratic primary results
Party	Candidate	Votes	%
Democratic	Linda Lopez	7,874	100.00%
Total votes		7,874	100.00%

General election results
Party	Candidate	Votes	%
Democratic	Linda Lopez	37,248	100.00%
Total votes		37,248	100.00%
Democratic hold			

=== District 30 ===
Democratic primary results
Party	Candidate	Votes	%
Democratic	Georgette W. Valle	11,962	100.00%
Total votes		11,962	100.00%

Republican primary results
Party	Candidate	Votes	%
Republican	Jonathan Paton	18,995	100.00%
Total votes		18,995	100.00%

General election results
Party	Candidate	Votes	%
Republican	Jonathan Paton	64,355	60.04%
Democratic	Georgette W. Valle	42,827	39.96%
Total votes		107,182	100.00%
Republican hold			
