= 2006 Arizona Senate election =

- November 7, 2006

All 30 seats of the Arizona Senate 16 seats needed for a majority
	Majority party	Minority party
Leader	Timothy S. Bee	Marsha Arzberger
Party	Republican	Democratic
Leader's seat	30th	25th
Seats before	18	12
Seats after	17	13
Seat change	▼1	▲1
- Results: Democratic hold Democratic gain Republican hold
Senate President before election
Ken Bennett
Republican
Elected Senate President
Timothy S. Bee
Republican

The 2006 Arizona Senate election was held on November 7, 2006. Voters elected members of the Arizona Senate in all 30 of the state's legislative districts to serve a two-year term. Primary elections were held on September 12, 2006.

Prior to the elections, the Republicans held a majority of 18 seats over the Democrats' 12 seats.

Following the election, Republicans maintained control of the chamber with 17 Republicans to 13 Democrats, a net gain of one seat for Democrats.

The newly elected senators served in the 48th Arizona State Legislature.

== Retiring Incumbents ==
=== Democrats ===
1. District 14: Bill Brotherton
2. District 16: Linda Aguirre
3. District 17: Ed Ableser (Note: Senator Ableser was sworn in on March 30, 2006, to replace Harry Mitchell who resigned effective March 23, 2006.)
4. District 24: Robert Cannell

=== Republicans ===
1. District 1: Ken Bennett
2. District 6: Dean Martin

== Incumbent Defeated in Primary Election ==
=== Republican ===
1. District 26: Toni Hellon

== Predictions ==
Source	Ranking	As of
Rothenberg	Safe R	November 4, 2006

== Summary of Results by Arizona State Legislative District ==
District	Incumbent	Party	Elected Senator	Outcome
1st	Ken Bennett	Rep	Tom O'Halleran	Rep Hold
2nd	Albert Hale	Dem	Albert Hale	Dem Hold
3rd	Ron Gould	Rep	Ron Gould	Rep Hold
4th	Jack Harper	Rep	Jack Harper	Rep Hold
5th	Jake Flake	Rep	Jake Flake	Rep Hold
6th	Dean Martin	Rep	Pamela Gorman	Rep Hold
7th	Jim Waring	Rep	Jim Waring	Rep Hold
8th	Carolyn S. Allen	Rep	Carolyn S. Allen	Rep Hold
9th	Robert "Bob" Burns	Rep	Robert "Bob" Burns	Rep Hold
10th	Linda Gray	Rep	Linda Gray	Rep Hold
11th	Barbara Leff	Rep	Barbara Leff	Rep Hold
12th	Robert Blendu	Rep	Robert Blendu	Rep Hold
13th	Richard Miranda	Dem	Richard Miranda	Dem Hold
14th	Bill Brotherton	Dem	Debbie McCune-Davis	Dem Hold
15th	Ken Cheuvront	Dem	Ken Cheuvront	Dem Hold
16th	Linda Aguirre	Dem	Leah Landrum	Dem Hold
17th	Ed Ableser	Dem	Meg Burton-Cahill	Dem Hold
18th	Karen S. Johnson	Rep	Karen S. Johnson	Rep Hold
19th	Chuck Gray (Note: Senator Gray was sworn in on March 15, 2006, to replace Marilyn Jarrett who died on March 10, 2006.)	Rep	Chuck Gray	Rep Hold
20th	John Huppenthal	Rep	John Huppenthal	Rep Hold
21st	Jay Tibshraeny	Rep	Jay Tibshraeny	Rep Hold
22nd	Thayer Verschoor	Rep	Thayer Verschoor	Rep Hold
23rd	Rebecca Rios	Dem	Rebecca Rios	Dem Hold
24th	Robert Cannell	Dem	Amanda Aguirre	Dem Hold
25th	Marsha Arzberger	Dem	Marsha Arzberger	Dem Hold
26th	Toni Hellon	Rep	Charlene Pesquiera	Dem Gain
27th	Jorge Luis Garcia	Dem	Jorge Luis Garcia	Dem Hold
28th	Paula Aboud (Note: Senator Aboud was sworn in on January 9, 2006, to replace Gabrielle Giffords who resigned effective December 1, 2005.)	Dem	Paula Aboud	Dem Hold
29th	Victor Soltero	Dem	Victor Soltero	Dem Hold
30th	Tim Bee	Rep	Tim Bee	Rep Hold

== Detailed Results ==
=== District 1 ===
Democratic primary results
Party	Candidate	Votes	%
Democratic	Jo Kelleher	8,418	100.00%
Total votes		8,418	100.00%

Republican primary results
Party	Candidate	Votes	%
Republican	Tom O'Halleran	10,266	49.60%
Republican	William Stoll	9,131	44.11%
Republican	Elise Townsend (Note: Candidate withdrew from the election.)	1,302	6.29%
Total votes		20,699	100.00%

Libertarian Primary Results
Party	Candidate	Votes	%
Libertarian	Terry Dunn (Note: Was a write-in candidate in the primary election.)	14	100.00%
Total votes		14	100.00%

General election results
Party	Candidate	Votes	%
Republican	Tom O'Halleran	44,713	61.17%
Democratic	Jo Kelleher	25,495	34.88%
Libertarian	Terry Dunn	2,887	3.95%
Total votes		73,095	100.00%
Republican hold			

=== District 2 ===
Democratic primary results
Party	Candidate	Votes	%
Democratic	Albert Hale (incumbent)	10,253	100.00%
Total votes		10,253	100.00%

Republican primary results
Party	Candidate	Votes	%
Republican	Royce Jenkins	2,743	100.00%
Total votes		2,743	100.00%

General election results
Party	Candidate	Votes	%
Democratic	Albert Hale (incumbent)	30,731	70.50%
Republican	Royce Jenkins	10,094	23.16%
Independent	Mark Haughwout	2,763	6.34%
Total votes		43,588	100.00%
Democratic hold			

=== District 3 ===
Democratic primary results
Party	Candidate	Votes	%
Democratic	Noah Harris	439	100.00%
Total votes		439	100.00%

Republican primary results
Party	Candidate	Votes	%
Republican	Ron Gould (incumbent)	12,913	100.00%
Total votes		12,913	100.00%

General election results
Party	Candidate	Votes	%
Republican	Ron Gould (incumbent)	29,957	61.86%
Democratic	Noah Harris	18,471	38.14%
Total votes		48,428	100.00%
Republican hold			

=== District 4 ===
Democratic primary results
Party	Candidate	Votes	%
Democratic	Ed Gogek	8,623	100.00%
Total votes		8,623	100.00%

Republican primary results
Party	Candidate	Votes	%
Republican	Jack Harper (incumbent)	15,253	76.87%
Republican	Willard "Bill" A. Whalen Jr.	4,589	23.13%
Total votes		19,842	100.00%

General election results
Party	Candidate	Votes	%
Republican	Jack Harper (incumbent)	48,949	59.08%
Democratic	Ed Gogek	33,901	40.92%
Total votes		82,850	100.00%
Republican hold			

=== District 5 ===
Democratic primary results
Party	Candidate	Votes	%
Democratic	Phil Cobb	8,366	100.00%
Total votes		8,366	100.00%

Republican primary results
Party	Candidate	Votes	%
Republican	Jake Flake (incumbent)	10,489	100.00%
Total votes		10,489	100.00%

General election results
Party	Candidate	Votes	%
Republican	Jake Flake (incumbent)	30,322	60.96%
Democratic	Phil Cobb	19,422	39.04%
Total votes		49,744	100.00%
Republican hold			

=== District 6 ===
Democratic primary results
Party	Candidate	Votes	%
Democratic	Jim Larson	3,933	100.00%
Total votes		3,933	100.00%

Republican primary results
Party	Candidate	Votes	%
Republican	Pamela Gorman	6,969	66.53%
Republican	Ted Carpenter	3,506	33.47%
Total votes		10,475	100.00%

General election results
Party	Candidate	Votes	%
Republican	Pamela Gorman	29,255	57.67%
Democratic	Jim Larson	21,477	42.33%
Total votes		50,732	100.00%
Republican hold			

=== District 7 ===
Democratic primary results
Party	Candidate	Votes	%
Democratic	Lisa Black	4,123	100.00%
Total votes		4,123	100.00%

Republican primary results
Party	Candidate	Votes	%
Republican	Jim Waring (incumbent)	10,828	100.00%
Total votes		10,828	100.00%

General election results
Party	Candidate	Votes	%
Republican	Jim Waring (incumbent)	31,735	57.08%
Democratic	Lisa Black	23,860	42.92%
Total votes		55,595	100.00%
Republican hold			

=== District 8 ===
Democratic primary results
Party	Candidate	Votes	%
Democratic	Dan Oseran	6,055	100.00%
Total votes		6,055	100.00%

Republican primary results
Party	Candidate	Votes	%
Republican	Carolyn S. Allen (incumbent)	10,844	55.77%
Republican	Colette Rosati	8,601	44.23%
Total votes		19,445	100.00%

General election results
Party	Candidate	Votes	%
Republican	Carolyn S. Allen (incumbent)	44,011	64.68%
Democratic	Dan Oseran	24,029	35.32%
Total votes		68,040	100.00%
Republican hold			

=== District 9 ===
Democratic primary results
Party	Candidate	Votes	%
Democratic	Steve Poe	7,211	100.00%
Total votes		7,211	100.00%

Republican primary results
Party	Candidate	Votes	%
Republican	Robert "Bob" Burns (incumbent)	12,344	100.00%
Total votes		12,344	100.00%

General election results
Party	Candidate	Votes	%
Republican	Robert "Bob" Burns (incumbent)	29,430	54.45%
Democratic	Steve Poe	24,623	45.55%
Total votes		54,053	100.00%
Republican hold			

=== District 10 ===
Democratic primary results
Party	Candidate	Votes	%
Democratic	Martin James Monroe	3,850	100.00%
Total votes		3,850	100.00%

Republican primary results
Party	Candidate	Votes	%
Republican	Linda Gray (incumbent)	6,420	100.00%
Total votes		6,420	100.00%

Libertarian Primary Results
Party	Candidate	Votes	%
Libertarian	Dan Poland	5	100.00%
Total votes		5	100.00%

General election results
Party	Candidate	Votes	%
Republican	Linda Gray (incumbent)	20,040	56.52%
Democratic	Martin James Monroe	15,416	43.48%
Total votes		35,456	100.00%
Republican hold			

=== District 11 ===
Democratic primary results
Party	Candidate	Votes	%
Democratic	Ann Wallack	6,137	100.00%
Total votes		6,137	100.00%

Republican primary results
Party	Candidate	Votes	%
Republican	Barbara Leff (incumbent)	11,741	100.00%
Total votes		11,741	100.00%

General election results
Party	Candidate	Votes	%
Republican	Barbara Leff (incumbent)	34,533	55.06%
Democratic	Ann Wallack	28,183	44.94%
Total votes		62,716	100.00%
Republican hold			

=== District 12 ===
Republican primary results
Party	Candidate	Votes	%
Republican	Robert Blendu (incumbent)	8,555	100.00%
Total votes		8,555	100.00%

General election results
Party	Candidate	Votes	%
Republican	Robert Blendu (incumbent)	39,627	100.00%
Total votes		39,627	100.00%
Republican hold			

=== District 13 ===
Democratic primary results
Party	Candidate	Votes	%
Democratic	Richard Miranda (incumbent)	2,834	100.00%
Total votes		2,834	100.00%

General election results
Party	Candidate	Votes	%
Democratic	Richard Miranda (incumbent)	13,979	100.00%
Total votes		13,979	100.00%
Democratic hold			

=== District 14 ===
Democratic primary results
Party	Candidate	Votes	%
Democratic	Debbie McCune-Davis	2,933	100.00%
Total votes		2,933	100.00%

General election results
Party	Candidate	Votes	%
Democratic	Debbie McCune-Davis	11,003	100.00%
Total votes		11,003	100.00%
Democratic hold			

=== District 15 ===
Democratic primary results
Party	Candidate	Votes	%
Democratic	Ken Cheuvront (incumbent)	4,553	100.00%
Total votes		4,553	100.00%

Republican primary results
Party	Candidate	Votes	%
Republican	Andrew Smigielski	3,052	100.00%
Total votes		3,052	100.00%

Libertarian Primary Results
Party	Candidate	Votes	%
Libertarian	John Williams	5	100.00%
Total votes		5	100.00%

General election results
Party	Candidate	Votes	%
Democratic	Ken Cheuvront (incumbent)	18,797	69.72%
Republican	Andrew Smigielski	8,164	30.28%
Total votes		26,961	100.00%
Democratic hold			

=== District 16 ===
Democratic primary results
Party	Candidate	Votes	%
Democratic	Leah Landrum	4,785	100.00%
Total votes		4,785	100.00%

Republican primary results
Party	Candidate	Votes	%
Republican	Daniel Veres	1,501	100.00%
Total votes		1,501	100.00%

General election results
Party	Candidate	Votes	%
Democratic	Leah Landrum	17,800	72.84%
Republican	Daniel Veres	6,636	27.16%
Total votes		24,436	100.00%
Democratic hold			

=== District 17 ===
Democratic primary results
Party	Candidate	Votes	%
Democratic	Meg Burton-Cahill	6,972	100.00%
Total votes		6,972	100.00%

Republican primary results
Party	Candidate	Votes	%
Republican	Rose Crutcher	6,478	100.00%
Total votes		6,478	100.00%

General election results
Party	Candidate	Votes	%
Democratic	Meg Burton-Cahill	26,285	62.86%
Republican	Rose Crutcher	15,530	37.14%
Total votes		41,815	100.00%
Democratic hold			

=== District 18 ===
Republican primary results
Party	Candidate	Votes	%
Republican	Karen S. Johnson (incumbent)	5,838	74.45%
Republican	Joe Brown	2,004	25.55%
Total votes		7,842	100.00%

Libertarian Primary Results
Party	Candidate	Votes	%
Libertarian	Rachel Kielsky	5	100.00%
Total votes		5	100.00%

General election results
Party	Candidate	Votes	%
Republican	Karen S. Johnson (incumbent)	20,122	70.48%
Libertarian	Rachel Kielsky	8,429	29.52%
Total votes		28,551	100.00%
Republican hold			

=== District 19 ===
Democratic primary results
Party	Candidate	Votes	%
Democratic	Steven Zachary	4,370	100.00%
Total votes		4,370	100.00%

Republican primary results
Party	Candidate	Votes	%
Republican	Chuck Gray (incumbent)	11,766	100.00%
Total votes		11,766	100.00%

General election results
Party	Candidate	Votes	%
Republican	Chuck Gray (incumbent)	34,262	61.50%
Democratic	Steven Zachary	21,450	38.50%
Total votes		55,712	100.00%
Republican hold			

=== District 20 ===
Democratic primary results
Party	Candidate	Votes	%
Democratic	Donna Gratehouse	4,231	100.00%
Total votes		4,231	100.00%

Republican primary results
Party	Candidate	Votes	%
Republican	John Huppenthal (incumbent)	7,453	100.00%
Total votes		7,453	100.00%

General election results
Party	Candidate	Votes	%
Republican	John Huppenthal (incumbent)	28,868	53.00%
Democratic	Donna Gratehouse	25,603	47.00%
Total votes		54,471	100.00%
Republican hold			

=== District 21 ===
Republican primary results
Party	Candidate	Votes	%
Republican	Jay Tibshraeny (incumbent)	10,905	100.00%
Total votes		10,905	100.00%

General election results
Party	Candidate	Votes	%
Republican	Jay Tibshraeny (incumbent)	48,318	100.00%
Total votes		48,318	100.00%
Republican hold			

=== District 22 ===
Democratic primary results
Party	Candidate	Votes	%
Democratic	Glenn A. Ray	4,595	100.00%
Total votes		4,595	100.00%

Republican primary results
Party	Candidate	Votes	%
Republican	Thayer Verschoor (incumbent)	8,595	57.91%
Republican	Joe Bedgood	6,248	42.09%
Total votes		14,843	100.00%

General election results
Party	Candidate	Votes	%
Republican	Thayer Verschoor (incumbent)	39,314	58.98%
Democratic	Glenn A. Ray	27,338	41.02%
Total votes		66,652	100.00%
Republican hold			

=== District 23 ===
Democratic primary results
Party	Candidate	Votes	%
Democratic	Rebecca Rios (incumbent)	8,850	100.00%
Total votes		8,850	100.00%

Republican primary results
Party	Candidate	Votes	%
Republican	Cheryl Chase	5,542	100.00%
Total votes		5,542	100.00%

General election results
Party	Candidate	Votes	%
Democratic	Rebecca Rios (incumbent)	24,137	53.62%
Republican	Cheryl Chase	20,875	46.38%
Total votes		45,012	100.00%
Democratic hold			

=== District 24 ===
Democratic primary results
Party	Candidate	Votes	%
Democratic	Amanda Aguirre	5,185	100.00%
Total votes		5,185	100.00%

Republican primary results
Party	Candidate	Votes	%
Republican	Russ Jones	6,015	100.00%
Total votes		6,015	100.00%

General election results
Party	Candidate	Votes	%
Democratic	Amanda Aguirre	14,821	48.92%
Republican	Russ Jones	14,548	48.02%
Reform	Stanley Lenihan	927	3.06%
Total votes		30,296	100.00%
Democratic hold			

=== District 25 ===
Democratic primary results
Party	Candidate	Votes	%
Democratic	Marsha Arzberger (incumbent)	11,321	100.00%
Total votes		11,321	100.00%

Republican primary results
Party	Candidate	Votes	%
Republican	Mary Ann Black	8,559	100.00%
Total votes		8,559	100.00%

General election results
Party	Candidate	Votes	%
Democratic	Marsha Arzberger (incumbent)	26,458	57.59%
Republican	Mary Ann Black	19,483	42.41%
Total votes		45,941	100.00%
Democratic hold			

=== District 26 ===
Democratic primary results
Party	Candidate	Votes	%
Democratic	Charlene Pesquiera	12,307	100.00%
Total votes		12,307	100.00%

Republican primary results
Party	Candidate	Votes	%
Republican	Al Melvin	10,924	56.82%
Republican	Toni Hellon (incumbent)	8,303	43.18%
Total votes		19,227	100.00%

General election results
Party	Candidate	Votes	%
Democratic	Charlene Pesquiera	36,069	50.32%
Republican	Al Melvin	35,614	49.68%
Total votes		71,683	100.00%
Democratic gain from Republican			

=== District 27 ===
Democratic primary results
Party	Candidate	Votes	%
Democratic	Jorge Luis Garcia (incumbent)	8,646	100.00%
Total votes		8,646	100.00%

General election results
Party	Candidate	Votes	%
Democratic	Jorge Luis Garcia (incumbent)	31,484	100.00%
Total votes		31,484	100.00%
Democratic hold			

=== District 28 ===
Democratic primary results
Party	Candidate	Votes	%
Democratic	Paula Aboud (incumbent)	9,158	54.18%
Democratic	Ted Downing	7,746	45.82%
Total votes		16,904	100.00%

General election results
Party	Candidate	Votes	%
Democratic	Paula Aboud (incumbent)	40,878	99.93%
Independent	J. Michael Steimer (Note: Was a write-in candidate in the general election.)	30	0.07%
Total votes		40,908	100.00%
Democratic hold			

=== District 29 ===
Democratic primary results
Party	Candidate	Votes	%
Democratic	Victor Soltero (incumbent)	7,193	100.00%
Total votes		7,193	100.00%

General election results
Party	Candidate	Votes	%
Democratic	Victor Soltero (incumbent)	24,579	100.00%
Total votes		24,579	100.00%
Democratic hold			

=== District 30 ===
Democratic primary results
Party	Candidate	Votes	%
Democratic	Jeffrey "Jeff" Chimene	13,861	100.00%
Total votes		13,861	100.00%

Republican primary results
Party	Candidate	Votes	%
Republican	Tim Bee (incumbent)	20,314	100.00%
Total votes		20,314	100.00%

General election results
Party	Candidate	Votes	%
Republican	Tim Bee (incumbent)	49,268	61.57%
Democratic	Jeffrey "Jeff" Chimene	30,752	38.43%
Total votes		80,020	100.00%
Republican hold			
