= Chuck Gray =

Chuck Gray may refer to:

- Chuck Gray (Wyoming politician), member of the Wyoming House of Representatives
- Chuck Gray (Arizona politician) (born 1958), member of the Arizona House of Representatives, and of the Arizona Senate
