= Senator Arzberger =

Senator Arzberger may refer to:

- Gus Arzberger (1921–2016), Arizona State Senate
- Marsha Arzberger (born 1937), Arizona State Senate
