= Olivia Cajero Bedford =

American politician (1938–2022)

Member of the Arizona Senate from the 3rd district
- In office January 14, 2013 – January 14, 2019
- Preceded by: David Schapira
- Succeeded by: Sally Ann Gonzales

Member of the Arizona Senate from the 27th district
- In office January 10, 2011 – January 14, 2013
- Preceded by: Maria Garcia* (see 2010 election)
- Succeeded by: Leah Landrum Taylor

Member of the Arizona House of Representatives from the 27th district
- In office January 2003 – January 10, 2011 Serving with Phil Lopes (2003–2011)

Personal details
- Born: August 15, 1938 Tucson, Arizona
- Died: February 9, 2022 (aged 83)
- Party: Democratic
- Education: Pima Community College; University of Arizona
- Website: www.senatorcajerobedford.com

Olivia Cajero Bedford (August 15, 1938 – February 9, 2022) was an American politician who was a Democratic member of the Arizona Senate, representing District 3 from 2013 to 2019. Cajero Bedford served consecutively in the Arizona State Legislature from January 2003 until January 10, 2011, in the Arizona House of Representatives District 27 seat, then in the Arizona Senate in the District 27 seat from January 10, 2011, until January 14, 2013.

== Personal life ==
Cajero Bedford was born in Tucson, Arizona. She attended Pima Community College and the University of Arizona.

She died on February 9, 2022, at the age of 83. Her death was announced on the floor of the Arizona Senate the next day.

== Electoral history ==
- 2000 To challenge incumbent Democratic Representatives Carmine Cardamone and Debora Norris, Cajero Bedford ran in the five-way September 12, 2000, Democratic Primary, but Representative Norris placed first and Representative Cardamone placed second; and won the November 7, 2000, General election where Representative Norris took the first seat and Representative Cardamone took the second seat ahead of Green candidate Bill Moeller.
- 2002 Redistricted to District 27, and with incumbent Democratic Representative Meg Burton Cahill and Republican Representative Laura Knaperek redistricted to District 17, Cajero Bedford ran in the six-way September 10, 2002, Democratic Primary, placing first with 4,436 votes; Cajero Bedford and fellow Democratic nominee Phil Lopes were unopposed for the November 5, 2002, General election, where Cajero Bedford took the first seat with 20,655 votes and Phil Lopes took the second seat.
- 2004 Cajero Bedford and Representative Lopes were unopposed for both the September 7, 2004, Democratic Primary, where Cajero Bedford placed first with 5,968 votes, and the November 2, 2004, General election, where Cajero Bedford took the first seat with 35,507 votes and Representative Lopes took the second seat.
- 2006 Cajero Bedford and Representative Lopes were unopposed for the September 12, 2006, Democratic Primary, where Cajero Bedford placed first with 7,639 votes, and won the three-way November 7, 2006, General election, where Cajero Bedford took the first seat with 24,756 votes and Representative Nichols took the second seat ahead of Republican nominee Gene Chewning.
- 2008 Cajero Bedford and Representative Lopes were challenged for the three-way September 2, 2008 Democratic Primary, where Cajero Bedford placed first with 7,357 votes and Representative Lopes placed second, and won the five-way November 2, 2010, General election, where Cajero Bedford took the first seat with 35,010 votes and Representative Lopes took the second seat ahead of Republican nominee J. D. Schechter, Libertarian candidate Mark Phelps, and Green candidate Kent Solberg. Nichols left after the term, having served alongside Yarbrough from 2003 until 2011.
- 2010 When Democratic Senator Jorge Luis Garcia ran for Arizona Corporation Commission and left the Senate District 27 seat open, Cajero Bedford was unopposed for the August 24, 2010, Democratic Primary, winning with 12,538 votes, and won the November 2, 2010, General election with 33,456 votes (99.7%) against two write-in candidates. Senator Garcia died between the primary and general elections, and his widow Maria Garcia was appointed to the vacancy.
- 2012 Redistricted to District 3, Cajero Bedford was challenged for the August 28, 2012, Democratic Primary by Jorge Luis Garcia's widow Maria Garcia, but Cajero Bedford placed first with 9,718 votes (66.8%), and was unopposed for the November 6, 2012, General election, winning with 43,084 votes.
