= Ken Cheuvront =

American politician

Kenneth D. Cheuvront
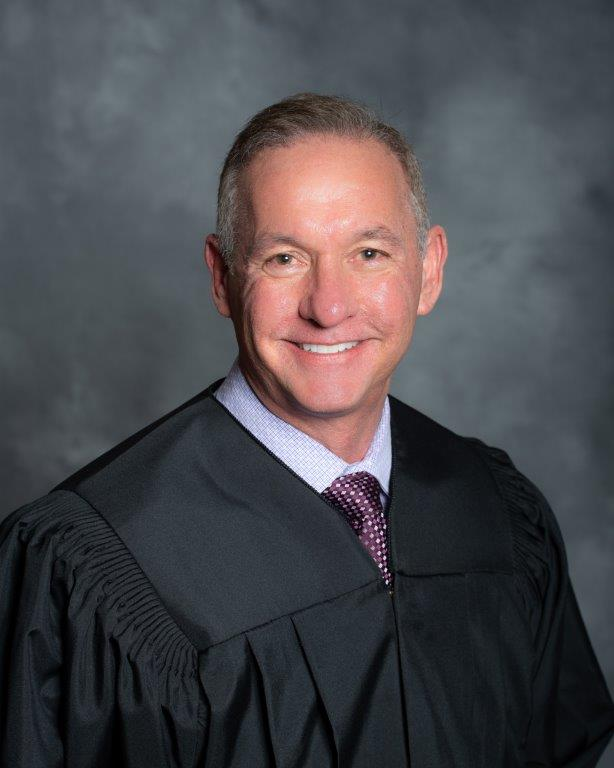

Member of the Arizona Senate from the 15th legislative district
- In office January 2003 – January 10, 2011
- Preceded by: Chris Cummiskey

Member of the Arizona House of Representatives from the 25th legislative district
- In office January 1995 – January 2003

Personal details
- Born: May 11, 1961 (age 65) Phoenix, AZ
- Party: Democratic
- Spouse: Matthew Stein
- Education: Institut Études Européenes, Claremont McKenna College, American Graduate School of International Management
- Profession: Justice of the Peace

Kenneth David Cheuvront (/ˈʃɛvrɒnt/; born May 11, 1961, in Phoenix, Arizona) is a Democratic politician. From 2003 to 2011 he served as Arizona state senator for District 15, which centers on Phoenix. In 2018, he was elected Encanto Justice of the Peace in central Phoenix. He is also owner of Cheuvront Construction Inc and Cheuvront Wine Bar.

Earlier he was elected to represent the 15th district in the State House of Representatives in 1994, becoming the first openly gay man elected to the Arizona House of Representatives, and held the seat until he was termed out in 2002. He was the Democratic Leader in that chamber in the 2001–02 session.

In 2002, he was elected to represent the district in the State Senate, winning the general election by a margin of 63% to 37%. He had previously run for the Senate in 1990, winning 44% of the primary election vote but losing to Chuck Blanchard. He won re-election in 2004 with 65% of the vote and in 2006 with 69%. He ran unopposed in 2008, and term limits will prevent him from seeking a fifth two-year term in 2010.

A supporter of Hillary Clinton's presidential campaign, Cheuvront was a delegate to the 2008 Democratic National Convention in Denver.

He is openly gay, and his campaigns have been supported by the Gay & Lesbian Victory Fund. He was one of five openly LGBT members of the Arizona State Legislature, serving alongside Sen. Paula Aboud (D–Tucson), as well as Reps. Robert Meza (D–Phoenix), Kyrsten Sinema (D–Phoenix) and Matt Heinz (D–Tucson). He is also a member of the Democratic Leadership Council.

== See also ==
- List of LGBT jurists in the United States
