= Lori Klein (politician) =

American politician

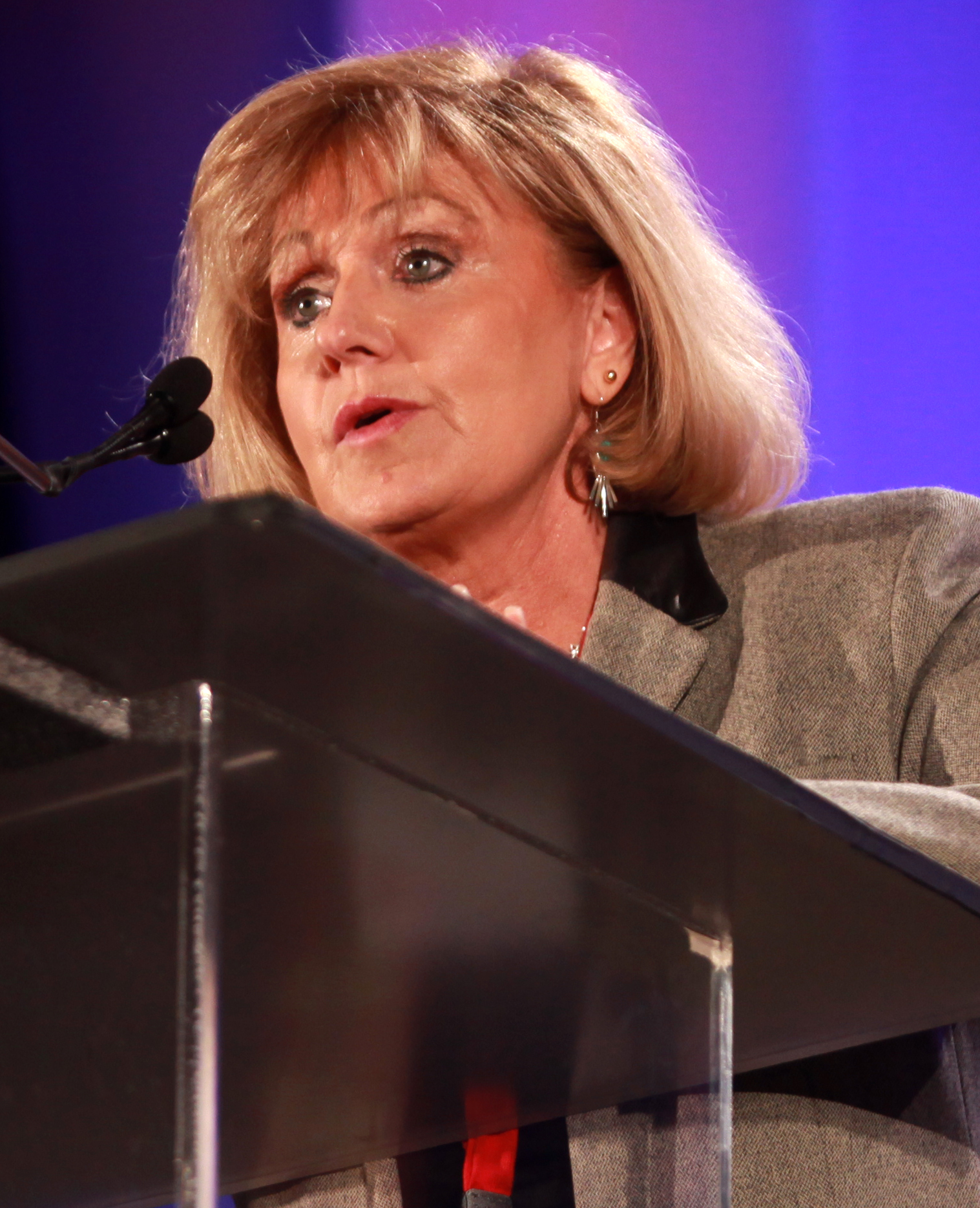
- Klein in 2014

Republican National Committeewoman from Arizona
- Incumbent
- Assumed office 2016

Member of the Arizona Senate from the 6th district
- In office January 10, 2011 – January 10, 2013
- Preceded by: David Braswell
- Succeeded by: Chester Crandell

Personal details
- Party: Republican
- Spouse: Robert K. Corbin (died 2025)
- Website: Profile

Lori Klein is an American politician from Arizona. A Republican, she formerly served in the Arizona Senate, representing the state's 6th district. She is currently the Arizona Republican National Committeewoman.

== Residence ==
Klein currently resides in Anthem, Arizona.

== Legislative committee assignments ==
Klein was involved with the following committees:

- Appropriations, Member
- Economic Development and Jobs Creation, Member
- Education, Member
- Finance, Member
- Government Reform, Vice Chair

== Professional experience ==
Klein has had the following professional experience:

- Owner, Lori Klein and Associates, present
- Development, The Health Care Freedom Act, present
- Director of Development, Medical Choice for Arizona (Proposition 101), 2008
- Executive Director, Medical Choice for Arizona (Proposition 101), 2008
- Executive Director, Proposition 207, 2006
- Spokesperson, Proposition 207, 2006
- National Director of Development, Americans for Fair Taxation, 2002–2006
- Executive Director, Taxpayer Protection Alliance, 1999–2000
- Director of Public Affairs, Arizona School Choice Trust, 1998
- Executive Director, Arizona School Choice Trust, 1998

== Political experience ==
Klein ran in the 2012 election for Arizona House of Representatives District 1. She was defeated by incumbents Karen Fann and Andy Tobin in the Republican primary on August 28, 2012. The general election took place on November 6, 2012.

Redistricting moved Klein's home into the same district as Senate President Steve Pierce. Rather than face him, she decided to run in the Arizona House of Representatives. As a result, she lost the Republican primary to incumbents Andy Tobin and Karen Fann.

Klein ran in the 2010 election for Arizona State Senate District 6. She defeated incumbent Republican David Braswell in the August 24 primary by a margin of 10,846–8,324. Klein then defeated Pat Flickner in the November 2 general election.

== Controversy ==
Klein sparked a debate about Arizona's gun laws after allegedly demonstrating her .380 Ruger's laser sight by pointing it at the chest of a reporter during an interview.
