= Frank Antenori =

Republican member of the Arizona Senate

Frank Ronald Antenori

Member of the Arizona Senate from the 30th district
- In office March 3, 2010 – January 10, 2013
- Preceded by: Jonathan Paton

Member of the Arizona House of Representatives from the 30th district
- In office January 3, 2009 – March 3, 2010 Serving with David Gowan
- Preceded by: Jonathan Paton
- Succeeded by: Ted Vogt

Personal details
- Born: Scranton, Pennsylvania
- Party: Republican
- Spouse: Lesley Antenori
- Education: Campbell University
- Profession: Senior Program Manager, Aerospace Defense Industry, Nationally Registered Paramedic (Former), U.S. Army Special Forces Medic (Retired)

Frank Ronald Antenori is an American politician who was a Republican member of the Arizona Senate, based in Tucson, Arizona.

== Early life, education, and military career ==
Frank Antenori was born and raised in Scranton, Pennsylvania. He joined the U.S. Army after graduating from high school in 1984. In 1987, he volunteered for the Special Forces Green Berets. In the late 1980s he trained Afghan "Mujahadeen Fighters" to fight against the Soviet Invasion of Afghanistan. He then served in the first Iraq War (Desert Storm). Ten years later, he was deployed in War in Afghanistan (2001–present) in 2002 and fought in Operation Anaconda. After that, he was deployed in Iraq, where he was recommended for the Silver Star and was awarded the Bronze Star Valor. In 2006, he authored a memoir called "Roughneck Nine-One: The extraordinary Story of a Special Forces A-Team at War," based on his experience in the Iraq War (specifically the Battle of Debecka Pass).

Frank has a Bachelor's degree in Health Science with a minor in Biology from Campbell University in Buies Creek, North Carolina. He graduated with a 3.94 GPA.

He volunteered First Responder for an Ambulance and Rescue Squad. He was a Nationally Registered Paramedic that worked in New York City with FDNY Paramedics and Emergency Medical Technicians in the Bronx, Queens, and Brooklyn. In June 2004, Frank retired from the military and moved to Tucson, Arizona. He currently works as a Senior Program Manager in the Aerospace Defense Industry. He oversees development of advanced precision munitions, missiles and weapons for the U.S. Military.

== 2006 congressional election ==
In 2006, incumbent Republican U.S. Congressman Jim Kolbe of Arizona's 8th congressional district decided to retire. Frank decided to run and ranked fourth in a five candidate field with 4% of the vote. State Representative Randy Graf won the Republican primary with a plurality of 42% of the vote.

== Arizona legislature ==
=== Elections ===
In 2012, he ran for Arizona's 10th Legislative District. As an incumbent, he lost to Democrat David Bradley

In 2008, he ran for Arizona's 30th House District. He won the Republican primary with 24% of the vote. He won the general election with 34% of the vote.

In March 2010, incumbent Republican State Senator Jonathan Paton decided to resign from his seat in order to run for congress. Republican Governor Jan Brewer appointed Representative Antenori to fill the vacant seat. In November 2010, he defeated Democratic nominee Todd Camenisch 60–40%.

=== Committee assignments ===
Arizona Senate Committees

- Senate Government Committee
- Senate Health and Human Services Committee
- Senate Transportation and Infrastructure Committee (Vice-Chairman)

== 2012 congressional election ==
In January 2012, incumbent Democratic U.S. Congresswoman Gabby Giffords decided to resign because of her critical condition from her 2011 Tucson shooting. There will be a special election in June, with the primary being held in April. Antenori has announced he will run for the 8th congressional district. Jesse Kelly won the Republican primary with 36% of the vote. Antenori ranked third with 22%.

== Personal life ==
He lives in Dragoon, Arizona with his wife Lesley, after living in Tucson and Cochise.
