= Paula Aboud =

American politician (born 1950)

Justice of the Peace (Pima County)
- Incumbent
- Assumed office December 28, 2016

Member of the Arizona Senate from the 28th district
- In office January 9, 2006 – January 14, 2013
- Preceded by: Gabby Giffords
- Succeeded by: Adam Driggs

Personal details
- Born: March 20, 1950 (age 76) Tucson, Arizona, U.S.
- Party: Democratic
- Education: University of Arizona
- Profession: Educator, real estate agent, property manager

Paula Aboud (born March 20, 1950) is an American politician who was a member of the Arizona Senate, representing the 28th District. A Democrat, she served as the Senate's minority whip.

== Early life ==
Aboud was born in Tucson, Arizona. She attended Tucson High School and earned a Bachelor of Arts in English from the University of Arizona. After receiving a teaching certificate, she taught English and coached girls' tennis and volleyball at Rincon High School for several years. Afterward she followed her family in entering the real estate field for five years, before relocating to Waterville, Maine, where she coached college tennis and squash at Colby College. An illness in her family led her to return to Tucson to work as property manager for her family's real estate business.

== Political career ==
In addition to her professional career Aboud was a long-time activist for the Tucson Democratic Party. On January 3, 2006, she was appointed to the Arizona State Senate by the Pima County Board of Supervisors, following the resignation of Gabby Giffords, who stepped down to run for the United States House of Representatives. She represents the 28th legislative district, centering on Tucson.

Following her appointment, she was elected in 2006. In the Democratic primary election on September 12, she saw off a challenge from State Representative Ted Downing, and faced no Republican opponent in the general election. She was re-elected unopposed in 2008 and faced only independent challengers in 2010 (including Ted Downing), prevailing easily.

In March 2012, Aboud announced her candidacy for Congress, seeking to run in the Democratic primary for Giffords' House seat in the newly renumbered 2nd congressional district. She withdrew from the race shortly thereafter and endorsed Ron Barber. Under Arizona's term limits law, she was unable to run for re-election to the senate in 2012.

In 2016, Aboud was elected a Justice of the Peace for Pima County district 6. Aboud was censured by the state Supreme Court in 2017 for allegedly “stealing” an answer key for a test for new judges. She was found not guilty of that charge but was censured for her actions.

In 2021, after leaving office, Aboud helped Pima County redistrict the Justice of the Peace districts. The Board of Supervisors selected her map which eliminated one district & one judge, thereby saving the county over $500,000.

== Personal life ==
She was the first openly Lesbian legislator and one of many openly LGBT members of the Arizona State Legislature, serving alongside Senators Ken Cheuvront (D-Phoenix) and Jack Jackson Jr. (D–Window Rock) and Robert Meza (D–Phoenix), as well as Representative Matt Heinz (D–Tucson). Her campaigns have won the backing of the Gay & Lesbian Victory Fund.

Arizona Senate
Preceded by Gabby Giffords	Arizona Senator from the 28th District; 2006–2013	Succeeded by Adam Driggs
Party political offices
Preceded by Linda J. Lopez	Minority Whip of the Arizona Senate; 2011–2013	Succeeded by Lupe Contreras
