= Matt Heinz =

American politician

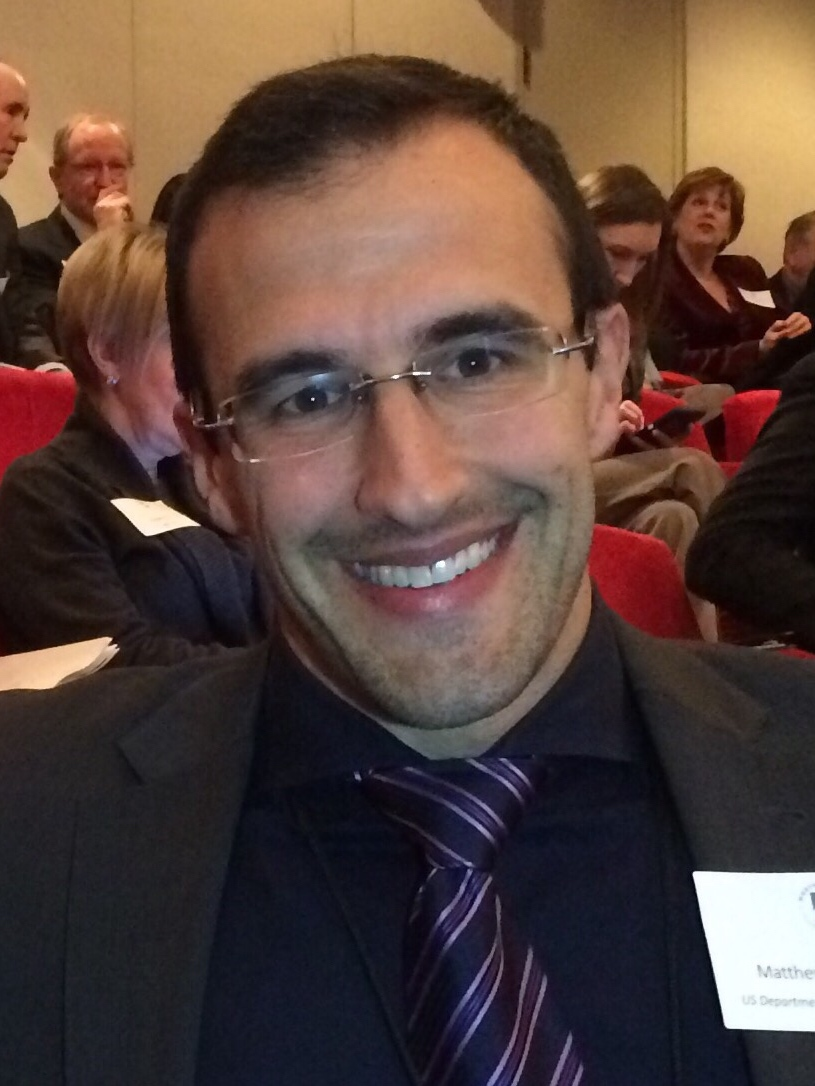
- Heinz in 2015

Pima County Supervisor
- Incumbent
- Assumed office 2020
- Preceded by: Ramon Valadez

Member of the Arizona House of Representatives from the 29th district
- In office January 12, 2009 – January 4, 2013
- Preceded by: Tom Prezelski; Linda Lopez
- Succeeded by: Martín Quezada; Lydia Hernandez

Personal details
- Born: June 6, 1977 (age 49) Midland, Michigan
- Party: Democratic
- Education: Albion College (BS), Wayne State University (MD)
- Profession: Medical doctor

Matthew G. Heinz (born June 6, 1977) is an American doctor and politician. A Democrat, he was appointed by President Barack Obama in June 2013 as Director of Provider Outreach in the Office of Intergovernmental and External Affairs, a part of the U.S. Department of Health and Human Services. Heinz was tasked with helping Secretary Kathleen Sebelius with the roll-out of the Affordable Care Act, with one aspect of his job to work with LGBT organizations across the country as they inform their members of their options in each state. For one or two weekends per month, Heinz continued his work as a hospitalist in Tucson, Arizona. Heinz left the position in March 2015.

Prior to his appointment, Heinz was a member of the Arizona House of Representatives from the 29th District. First elected in 2008, he took office on January 12, 2009, won re-election to his seat in 2010 and toward the end of his second term, he ran as a candidate for US Congress. In 2020 he won the Pima County Supervisor seat from 2nd district.

== Personal life, education, and medical career ==
Heinz earned a BA in Chemistry from Albion College and has an MD from Wayne State University School of Medicine. In 2000, he was granted a fellowship in vascular surgery at Harvard Medical School, where he conducted research. He completed his residency in internal medicine at the University of Arizona and is a practicing physician at Tucson Medical Center.

He is of Lebanese and German descent. Heinz is openly gay and his campaign for the Arizona state legislature won the support of the Gay & Lesbian Victory Fund.

== Arizona House of Representatives ==
=== Elections ===
The 29th District, entirely located in Pima County, includes parts of Tucson and Littletown. It is reliably Democratic.

2006

He ran for Arizona's 28th House District. He lost the Democratic primary, getting 23% of the vote. Steve Farley ranked first with 33%. Incumbent State Representative David T. Bradley ranked second with 33%.

2008

He then ran for Arizona's 29th House District. Term limits prevented incumbent Democratic State Representative Linda Lopez from running for re-election in 2008. Heinz was one of seven Democrats to file for the two house seats. In the primary election, he ranked first with 25% of the vote. Incumbent State Representative Tom Prezelski came in third with 16% and lost his seat, behind Heinz and second-placed finisher Daniel Patterson. In the general election, Patterson ranked first 33% and Heinz ranked second with 32%.

2010

He won re-election 35% of the vote, ranking second to Patterson again, who got 37% of the vote.

=== Committee assignments ===
- House Appropriations Committee
- House Public Employees, Retirement and Entitlement Reform Committee

== U.S. House campaigns ==
=== 2012 ===
Following the resignation of incumbent Democratic U.S. Congresswoman Gabby Giffords, Heinz announced his candidacy for the special election for the seat. He later withdrew from the race before the election.

=== 2016 ===
Heinz announced in 2015 that he would run for the 2016 Democratic nomination in Arizona's 2nd congressional district.

In August 2016, Heinz won the primary with 53.2 percent of the vote, defeating Victoria Steele. In the general election, he faced Republican incumbent Martha McSally. McSally was re-elected with 57% of the vote.

=== 2018 ===
Heinz announced in 2017 that he would again run for the 2018 Democratic nomination in Arizona's 2nd congressional district.

In August 2018, Heinz lost the 7-way primary with 29.6 percent of the vote to Ann Kirkpatrick who received 41.9 percent.
