= Charlene Pesquiera =

American politician

Member of the Arizona Senate from the 26th district
- In office 2006 – January 12, 2008
- Preceded by: Toni L. Hellon
- Succeeded by: Albert A. Melvin

Personal details
- Born: Los Angeles, California
- Party: Democratic
- Spouse: Garrett Burner
- Education: Pima Community College; Prescott College; University of Phoenix
- Occupation: judge, educator, business owner

Charlene Pesquiera is a Democratic politician from Arizona. She served as Arizona State Senator for District 26 from 2007 until 2008, when she declined to run for re-election. She is currently the Justice of the Peace for Pima County Precinct Four, which she was elected to in 2016.

== Personal ==
Pesquiera was born in Los Angeles, California and moved to Tucson, Arizona in 1971. She received an Associate's degree in Criminal Justice and Corrections at Pima Community College, a Pre Law and criminal justice degree at Prescott College, and a Master's Degree in Business Administration from the University of Phoenix. She is also the co-owner of the National Institute of Contract Management, LLC. Pesquiera is married to Garrett Burner and has a son, Korey.
