= Thayer Verschoor =

Arizona state senator

President pro tempore of the Arizona Senate
- In office January 2009 – January 10, 2011
- Preceded by: Robert Blendu
- Succeeded by: Sylvia Allen

Member of the Arizona Senate from the 22nd district
- In office January 2003 – January 10, 2011
- Preceded by: Joe Eddie Lopez
- Succeeded by: Andy Biggs

Personal details
- Born: Thayer Lamont Verschoor; May 16, 1961 (age 65) Yuma, Arizona, U.S.
- Party: Republican
- Spouse: Carla
- Education: Arizona State University (BS)

Thayer Lamont Verschoor (born May 16, 1961) was a Republican in the Arizona Senate.
