= Debbie McCune Davis =

American politician

Member of the Arizona Senate from the 14th district
- In office January 8, 2007 – January 10, 2011
- Preceded by: Bill Brotherton
- Succeeded by: Robert Meza

Member of the Arizona House of Representatives from the 14th district
- In office January 10, 2011 – January 9, 2017
- Preceded by: Robert Meza
- Succeeded by: Tony Navarrete
- In office January 13, 2003 – January 8, 2007
- Preceded by: Marion L. Pickens; Edward M. Poelstra
- Succeeded by: Robert Meza

Member of the Arizona House of Representatives from the 20th district
- In office January 8, 1979 – January 9, 1995
- Preceded by: Jerry Moore
- Succeeded by: Kathie Foster; Robert Blendu

Personal details
- Born: August 12, 1951 (age 75) Braddock, Pennsylvania
- Party: Democratic
- Spouse: Glenn
- Education: Glendale Community College, Arizona State University
- Profession: Public administration

Debbie McCune Davis (born August 12, 1951) is a Democratic politician in the United States. She has served as Arizona State Senator for District 14 from 2006 to 2017. Earlier she was a member of the Arizona House of Representatives from 1979 through 1994, and from 2003 through 2006.
