= Ron Gould (politician) =

American politician

Member of the Arizona Senate from the 3rd district
- In office January 3, 2005 – January 10, 2013
- Preceded by: Linda Binder

Treasurer of the Arizona Republican Party
- Incumbent
- Assumed office January 26, 2025
- Preceded by: Elijah Norton

Personal details
- Born: Ronald Charles Gould
- Party: Republican
- Profession: Small business owner

Ronald Charles Gould (born August 7, 1960) is a small business owner and a former Republican member of the Arizona Senate from Lake Havasu City, representing the 3rd Senate District from 2005 until 2013.

== Early life, education, and business career ==
Gould was born and raised in Orange County, California, but moved to Arizona in 1995. He was a councilman from Lake Havasu City. He has been a small business owner of an air conditioning and heating company since 1984.

== Arizona Senate ==
=== Elections ===
In 2004, he decided to run for the open seat Arizona Senate's 3rd District. In the Republican primary, he defeated State Representative Joe Hart and Bill Wagner 40%-30%-30%. In the general election, he won his first term unopposed.

In 2006, he won re-election to a second term with 62% of the vote. In 2008, he won re-election to a third term with 63% of the vote. In 2010, he won re-election to a fourth term with 72% of the vote.

Termed out of the state Senate, he decided to pursue a congressional seat in Arizona's 4th District.

=== Tenure ===
The Goldwater Institute, Americans for Prosperity, and the Arizona Federation of Taxpayers rate him as the most conservative Arizona State Senator. He voted for the controversial anti-illegal immigration bill Arizona SB 1070. Gould sponsored legislation that would've allowed concealed carry permit holders to carry firearms at public university and community college campuses, as is the law at most government buildings in Arizona. He sponsored SB 1309 that would change the law to get "Arizona citizenship," a baby must be "a child of at least one parent who owes no allegiance to any foreign sovereignty, or a child without citizenship or nationality in any foreign country." He also sponsored SB 1308, which would seek to add a distinction on "birth certificates, certifications of live birth or other birth records ... between a person born in the party state who is born subject to the jurisdiction of the United States and a person who is not born subject to the jurisdiction of the United States."

=== Committee assignments ===
2011–2012

- Appropriations Committee (vice chair)
- Finance Committee
- Government Reform Committee
- Judiciary Committee (chair)
- Water, Land Use and Rural Development Committee

2009–2010

- Appropriations Committee
- Finance Committee
- Retirement and Rural Development Committee (chair)

== 2012 congressional election ==
In the wake of redistricting, Gould announced on December 1, 2011, that he will form exploratory committee to run for the newly created Arizona's 4th congressional district. A month later, he officially entered the race.

Gould lost the primary to incumbent Paul Gosar, who had represented the 1st Congressional District prior to the 2012 redistricting.

== Controversies ==
In 2010, Ron Gould walked out of Republican Governor Jan Brewer's State of the State Speech in objection to a proposal that would have temporarily raised sales taxes.

=== Guns on campus ===
Ron Gould sponsored "Guns on College Campus" legislation which would prohibit college administrators from banning guns on college campuses throughout Arizona. Reports showed that the bill would cost the universities $13 million in one time fees and $3 million in yearly costs if administrators prohibited weapons in classrooms, but the bill did not appropriate any additional money to cover the cost. The bill ultimately failed to pass and Gould declared it "dead" in May 2012.

== Personal life ==
He lives with his wife, Janice, and his three children: Ronald Jr, Robert, and Rachael.
