= Barbara Leff =

Former American politician (1947-2026)

Member of the Arizona Senate from the 11th district
- In office January 13, 2003 – January 10, 2011
- Preceded by: Elaine Richardson
- Succeeded by: Adam Driggs

Member of the Arizona House of Representatives from the 24th district
- In office January 13, 1997 – January 13, 2003
- Preceded by: Ernie Baird
- Succeeded by: Jim Carruthers

Personal details
- Born: May 14, 1947 New York City, New York, U.S.
- Died: January 14, 2026 (aged 78)
- Party: Republican

Barbara Leff (May 14, 1947 - January 14, 2026) was an American politician who served in the Arizona House of Representatives from the 24th district from 1997 to 2003 and in the Arizona Senate from the 11th district from 2003 to 2011.
