= Marsha Arzberger =

American politician

Member of the Arizona Senate from the 25th district
- In office 2003–2008

Personal details
- Born: 1937 (age 88–89) Saint Joseph, Missouri
- Party: Democratic
- Spouse: Gus Arzberger
- Education: Northwest Missouri State University, Arizona State University
- Occupation: Businesswoman, farmer, rancher

Marsha Arzberger is a Democratic politician. She served as Arizona State Senator for District 25 from 2003 to 2008, and before that for District 8 from 2000 to 2001.

== Personal life and education ==
Marsha Gibson was born in St. Joseph, Missouri. She has lived in Willcox, Arizona, since 1967. Arzberger earned a Bachelor of Science in education from Northwest Missouri State University in 1959 and a Master's in Public Administration from Arizona State University. She married Gus Arzberger. They have four children.

Arzberger published a novel, Passion's Treasure, using her maiden name in 1982. She has a private pilot's licence.

== Career ==
- Arizona Board of Regents 1993–2000
- Assistant to the director for special projects (higher education analyst)
- Dean of Draughon's Business College
- Professor of Oklahoma Junior College of Business and Technology
- Registered medical laboratory technologist
- Farmer-rancher

=== Elected ===
- Elected precinct committee person 1982–1996
- State Senate 2000–2001, District 8
- State Senate 2003–2004, District 25

=== Interim committees ===
- Rural physicians study committee (co-chair)
- Ad Hoc study committee on State retirees health benefits (chair)
- Blue ribbon task force on effluent reuse (co-chair)
- Joint legislative study committee on State employee compensation

=== Appointments and boards ===
- Arizona Commission of Agriculture and Horticulture (Governor's appointment) 1979–1982
- Cochise College Foundation Board member since 1999

== Organizations ==
- Cochise College Foundation Board
- Farm Bureau
- Cattle Growers
- Business & Professional Women
- American Association of University Women
- National Organization of Women Legislators
- Cochise County Democrats
- Friends of the Library
- Sulphur Springs Historical Society
- League of Women Voters

== Community service ==
- Civil Air Patrol – 30-year member. Group Commander of Southeast Arizona; Command Search Pilot; Search and Rescue Mission Commander
- Volunteered at Willcox Elementary and Middle schools
- Served on Willcox, Arizona public schools community committees
