= Amanda Aguirre =

American politician (born 1953)

Member of the Arizona Senate from the 24th district
- In office 2006–2010

Personal details
- Born: February 6, 1953 (age 73) Agua Prieta, Sonora, Mexico
- Citizenship: Naturalized
- Party: Democrat
- Education: University of Sonora, California State University, Los Angeles
- Occupation: President/CEO of non-profits Regional Center for Border Health and San Luis Walk-in Clinic

Amanda Aguirre (born February 6, 1953) is a Democratic politician. She served as an Arizona State Senator from 2006 to 2010 and as an Arizona State Representative from 2003 to 2006 for District 24. In May 2012, Aguirre announced that she was entering the race to represent Arizona's 3rd congressional district.

== Personal life ==
Aguirre has been involved in public health education and administration. She has put a strong emphasis on the health issues involved with the U.S.-Mexico border. Aguirre lives in Yuma, Arizona. Her lifelong commitment is aimed at education since she was raised by parents who were both elementary school teachers. Her parents had a large influence on her political ideologies and from them she developed her Democratic values to serve her community. In her free time, Aguirre enjoys traveling, reading, playing guitar, kayaking on the Colorado River, and spending time with her significant other and cat "Nafta".

== Education ==
Aguirre obtained a B.S. in chemistry from the University of Sonora in Hermosillo, Sonora, Mexico. In 1981, she received her master's degree from California State University, Los Angeles, in Nutrition, with a focus on feeding problems of children with developmental disabilities.

== Career ==
Aguirre became the first female and first Hispanic to represent District 24 (Yuma and La Paz Counties) in the Arizona State House of Representatives in February 2003, when the Yuma County Board of Supervisors appointed her to the 46th Arizona State Legislature. She was later elected to serve in the House of Representatives for a full term a year later, and the Arizona State Senate in 2006, where she has served ever since.

Aguirre has had great success in passing key bi-partisan legislation. One of her latest and most popular bills established an Autism Task Force legislative committee to review the coordination of services provided by state agencies, schools and organizations relating to the treatment of persons with autism spectrum disorder and recommend solutions for improvement of these services. On a similar note, she was also the champion of legislation passed in 2008 coined "Steven's Law", which requires private medical insurance companies to provide Autism intervention service coverage under their insurance plan benefits.

Aguirre was appointed by Governor Jan Brewer to serve on her 5-member bipartisan Advisory Group for Behavioral Health, a committee made up of two senators, two representatives to address structural reform and challenges faced by the state in administering and delivering behavioral health services.

In 2008 and 2009 Aguirre was appointed to co-chair the In-Home Care Study Committee, which made her the only Democrat to co-chair a joint legislative committee in a Republican controlled legislature. Aguirre is also the current ranking member on the Senate Healthcare and Medical Liability Reform Committee. Currently she serves on the Northern Arizona University Interdisciplinary Health Policy Institute Advisory Board, which compiles twelve of the most influential healthcare decision-makers in the state.

Aguirre is involved clean-up of illegal dumping sites in her district, and hosting county-wide child immunization events.
