= Carolyn Allen =

American politician (1937–2016)

Member of the Arizona Senate from the 8th district
- In office January 2003 – January 2011

Member of the Arizona House of Representatives from the 28th district
- In office January 1995 – January 2003
- Preceded by: Michele Reagan

Personal details
- Born: September 8, 1937 Hannibal, Missouri, U.S.
- Died: August 27, 2016 (aged 78)
- Party: Republican
- Profession: Politician

Carolyn Allen (September 8, 1937 – August 27, 2016) was a member of the Arizona House of Representatives and the Arizona State Senate from 1994 through 2011. She was first elected to the Arizona House in November 1992, where she represented District 28. She was subsequently re-elected three times to the House, always representing District 29. After serving four terms in the House, the Arizona Constitution prevented Allen from running for a fifth term. She ran for the Arizona Senate in 2002 in District 8, which was new due to redistricting in the state. She won the election and won re-election 3 more times to serve as the State Senator from District 8.
