= Leah Landrum Taylor =

American politician (born 1966)

Member of the Arizona Senate from the 27th district
- In office January 2013 – January 2015
- Preceded by: Olivia Cajero Bedford
- Succeeded by: Catherine Miranda

Member of the Arizona Senate from the 16th district
- In office January 2007 – January 2013
- Preceded by: Linda Aguirre
- Succeeded by: Rich Crandall

Personal details
- Born: August 23, 1966 (age 60) Phoenix, Arizona
- Party: Democratic
- Spouse: Gregory
- Education: Arizona State University
- Profession: Businesswoman, educator

Leah Landrum Taylor (born August 23, 1966) is a Democratic politician. She was in the Arizona legislature for sixteen years, first in the House of Representatives from 1999 through 2007, then in the Senate from 2007 to 2015. She represented the 23rd, 16th, and 27th districts; the lines were redrawn at the beginning of each decade. Landrum Taylor was the Senate minority leader from January to October 2013. During her final term, Landrum Taylor was the only African-American in the Legislature.

She is a member of Sigma Gamma Rho sorority.
