= Robert Meza =

American politician

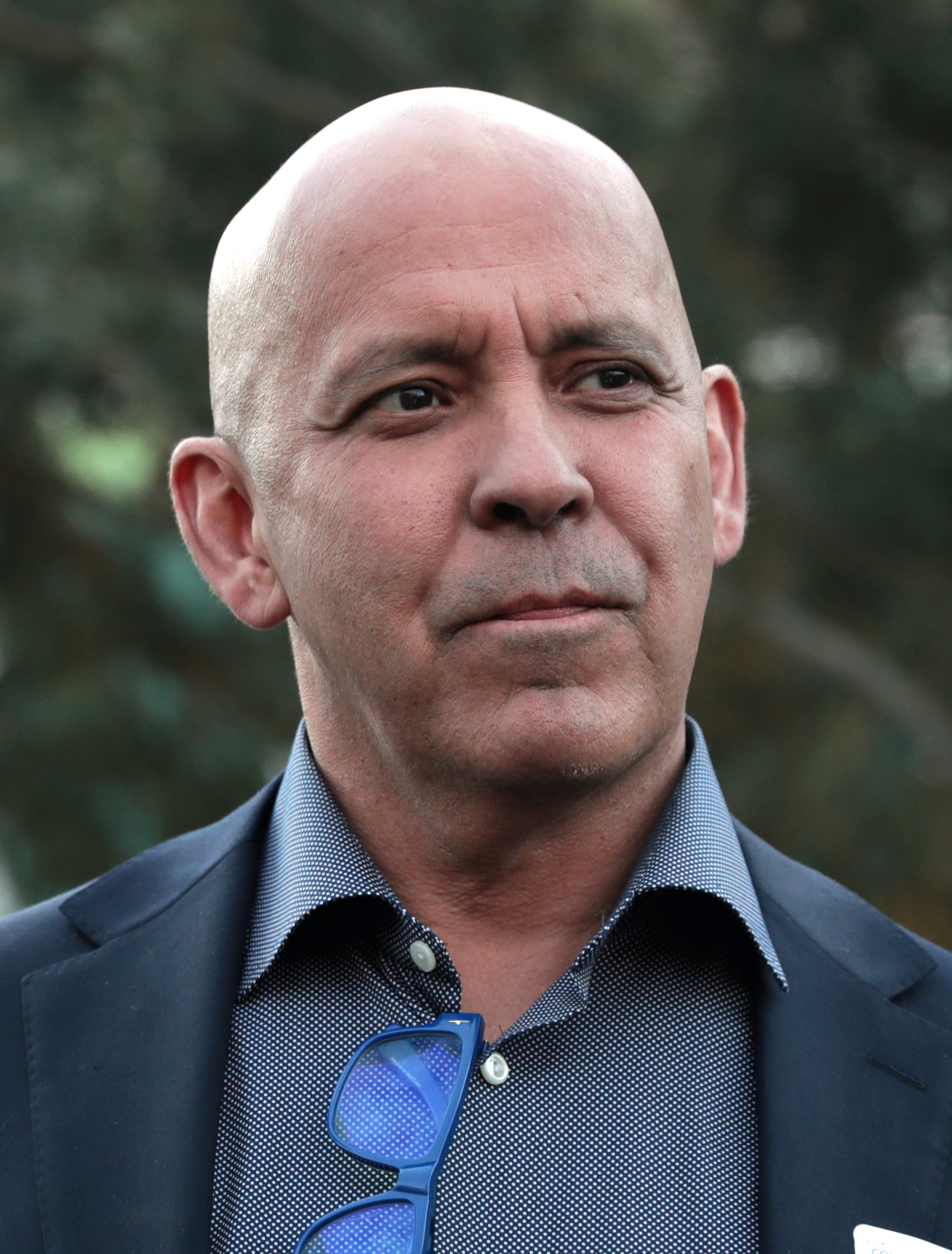
- Meza in 2022

Member of the Arizona House of Representatives from the 30th district
- In office January 14, 2019 – January 9, 2023 Serving with Raquel Teran
- Preceded by: Tony Navarrete
- Succeeded by: Leo Biasiucci

Member of the Arizona Senate from the 30th district
- In office January 10, 2011 – January 14, 2019
- Preceded by: Debbie McCune Davis
- Succeeded by: Tony Navarrete

Member of the Arizona House of Representatives from the 14th district
- In office January 6, 2003 – January 10, 2011

Personal details
- Party: Democratic
- Education: University of Notre Dame

Robert Meza is an American politician from Phoenix, Arizona who served as a member of the Arizona House of Representatives from District 30 from 2019 to 2023. He previously served in the Arizona State Senate from 2011 to 2019, and also served four prior terms in the Arizona House of Representatives from 2003 to 2011.

== Career ==
A Democrat, he represented the reliably Democratic 30th legislative district which covers parts of central and west Phoenix and part of Glendale, Arizona. He was first elected to the Arizona House of Representatives in 2002 and won re-election in 2004, 2006 and 2008. Term limits prevented him from seeking a fifth House term in 2010, he ran unopposed for the district's Arizona State Senate seat. Meza has won ten consecutive elections since beginning his political career.

While serving in the Arizona House of Representatives and in his first term in the Arizona State Senate, Meza represented the 14th Legislative District. Meza began serving the 30th Legislative District following the 2012 election. This was due to redistricting based on results from the 2010 Census.

In the 2017–2018 legislative biennium, he served on three committees: Commerce and Public Safety, Government, and Senate Ethics.

Meza currently serves on the boards of the Anti-Defamation League and the Phoenix Theatre, where he worked as a teenager.

He is openly gay, and was the first openly gay Hispanic legislator in the nation. Meza served alongside two other openly LGBT legislators: Rep. Daniel Hernández Jr., D-Tucson and Rep. César Chávez, D-Phoenix.

In October 2017, on National Coming Out Day, the four lawmakers announced the creation of a new LGBTQ Caucus in the legislature.

== Personal life ==
Before studying at the University of Notre Dame, Meza attended Bourgade Catholic High School in Phoenix. After graduating from the university, Meza spent seven years in the banking industry, where he worked on small and commercial loans.

Meza is Jewish, becoming so after converting from Catholicism.

== Elections ==
Meza was unopposed in the Democratic primary. He defeated Republican John Lyon in the general election with 66% of the vote.
