= Linda Gray (politician) =

American politician

Linda Gray is a Republican State Senator in Arizona.

Gray was born in St. Charles, Missouri and educated at the University of Northern Colorado.

Gray was first elected to the Arizona State Senate in 2004.

== Sources ==
- Gray's senate bio
- Vote Smart bio of Gray
