= Bob Burns (Arizona politician) =

American politician (born 1938)

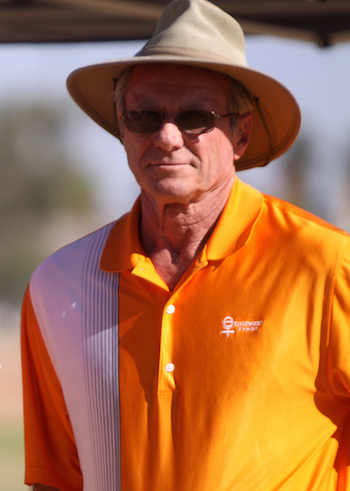
- Burns in 2016

Member of the Arizona Corporation Commission
- In office January 7, 2013 – January 11, 2021
- Preceded by: Paul Newman
- Succeeded by: Anna Tovar

President of the Arizona Senate
- In office January 2009 – January 10, 2011
- Preceded by: Tim Bee
- Succeeded by: Russell Pearce

Member of the Arizona Senate from the 9th district
- In office January 2003 – January 2011
- Preceded by: ???
- Succeeded by: Rick Murphy

Member of the Arizona House of Representatives from the 17th district
- In office January 1989 – January 2001
- Preceded by: Sterling Ridge
- Succeeded by: Phil Hanson; John B. Nelson

Personal details
- Born: May 26, 1938 (age 88) Rolfe, Iowa, U.S.
- Party: Republican
- Spouse: Gayle Burns
- Education: Glendale Community College, Arizona

Robert Burns (born May 26, 1938) is an American politician from Arizona. He is a former member of the Arizona Corporation Commission. Prior to that, he served in the Arizona State Senate, where in his final term, he was also elected as the President of the Senate. Before that he served six terms in the Arizona House of Representatives.

== Career ==
Robert Burns was a member of the Arizona House of Representatives and the Arizona State Senate. He was elected to the House in 1988, and serve in that body from January 1989 through January 2001, winning re-election five times. He did not run in the November 2010 election. In the 2002 election he ran for the Senate in District 9, which was new due to redistricting, and won. He won re-election to the seat three times and served in the Senate from January 2003 through January 2011. During his last term in the Senate he was also elected as the President of the Senate. Due to Arizona's term limits, he was unable to run again for the Senate in the November 2010 election. In 2012 he ran for the Arizona Corporation Commission, and won. He won re-election to the Commission in the 2016, and is an incumbent on the Commission.

Burns played a key role in the development of the Arizona Telemedicine Council, initiating the legislation that created it, and serving as the first co-chairman of the council.

Political offices
Preceded by Tim Bee	President of the Arizona Senate; 2009–2011	Succeeded by Russell Pearce
Preceded by Paul Newman	Member of the Arizona Corporation Commission; 2013–2021	Succeeded by Anna Tovar
