= Pamela Gorman =

American politician

Member of the Arizona Senate from the 6th district
- In office 2006 – January 2010

Personal details
- Party: Republican
- Education: Arizona State University
- Occupation: Politician and partner in a consulting firm

Pamela Diane Gorman is a conservative Republican politician. She was first elected to the Arizona House of Representatives in 2004 and most recently served as Arizona State Senator for District 6 from her election in 2006 (and reelection in 2008) until she vacated her seat on January 25, 2010, in order to run for Congress to replace the retiring John Shadegg. While running to be the Republican nominee for U.S. Representative from Arizona's District 3, she gained national attention for a campaign ad showing her firing a Thompson submachine gun, and for her cosponsorship of Arizona's anti-illegal immigration bill. She lost to Ben Quayle, the son of former vice president, Dan Quayle.

== Early life and education ==
Gorman was born and raised in Des Moines, Iowa, and has lived in Arizona since 1986. She holds a degree in communication from Arizona State University and is an avid pistol shooter.

== Career ==
Gorman served as Majority Whip of the Arizona Senate, but resigned the post over a split with the governor over fiscal policy.

Gorman successfully filibustered legislation that would have increased public financial support for political campaigns, the "Clean Elections" Program.

Gorman has been chair of the Standing Committees of the National Conference of State Legislatures (NCSL); a member of the executive committee of Commerce, Insurance and Economic Development Task Force with the American Legislative Exchange Council (ALEC); and a member of the National Legislative Advisory Board of the Heartland Institute; and a participant in Hanns Seidel Foundation Exchange.

== Controversies ==
In 2005, Gorman joined the Legislative Advisory Board of the Heartland Institute, a think tank that has raised doubts about anthropogenic climate change.

Also in 2005, Gorman was one of several Arizona legislators who supported parental rights legislation which was also supported by the Citizens Commission on Human Rights. One piece of CCHR-sponsored legislation, which required parental consent for any mental health evaluations of students by schools, would have required parents to read through "paragraph after paragraph of negative information about psychiatric practices." She attended the grand opening of the Church of Scientology's Psychiatry: An Industry of Death exhibit in Los Angeles in December 2005 at the request of Robin Read, President of the National Federation for Women Legislators, with her round-trip airfare paid for by CCHR.

== See also ==
- United States House of Representatives elections in Arizona, 2010
