= Jack Harper (politician) =

American politician

Member of the Arizona Senate from the 4th district
- In office January 2003 – January 2011
- Preceded by: Jack A. Brown
- Succeeded by: Scott Bundgaard

Member of the Arizona House of Representatives from the 4th district
- In office January 2011 – January 2013
- Preceded by: Tom Boone

Personal details
- Born: September 9, 1967 (age 58)
- Party: Republican

Jack Harper (born September 9, 1967) is a former Republican member of the Arizona Senate and the Arizona House of Representatives, representing Arizona Legislative District 4. He served in the Senate from January 2003 until January 2011, and in the House from January 2011 until January 2013.
