= Richard Miranda (politician) =

American politician (born 1956)

Member of the Arizona Senate from the 13th district
- In office January 13, 2003 – January 10, 2011
- Preceded by: Virginia Yrun
- Succeeded by: Steve Gallardo

Member of the Arizona House of Representatives from the 13th district
- In office January 10, 2011 – February 2012
- Preceded by: Martha Garcia

Personal details
- Born: March 6, 1956 (age 70) Phoenix, Arizona
- Party: Democratic
- Spouse: Divorced
- Occupation: Businessman

Richard Miranda (born March 6, 1956) is a former Democratic member of the Arizona Senate, representing the 13th District from 2002 to 2011. Previously, he was a member of the Arizona House of Representatives from 1999 through 2002.

In February 2012, Miranda resigned from the Arizona legislature citing health and family issues. In March 2012, he pleaded guilty to wire fraud and tax evasion for stealing $250,000 from a charity which he ran. On June 4, he was sentenced to 27 months in federal prison and will have to pay back the hundreds of thousands of dollars he stole from two non-profit organizations.
