= Robert Blendu =

American politician (born 1943)

Member of the Arizona Senate from the 12th district
- In office January 2003 – January 2009
- Preceded by: Toni Hellon
- Succeeded by: John B. Nelson

Personal details
- Born: January 4, 1943 (age 83) Gary, Indiana, U.S.
- Party: Republican
- Spouse(s): Leslie Blendu - 2nd wife. First wife, Ann Blendu (deceased, married nearly 50 years
- Children: Robert
- Profession: Politician

Robert Blendu (born January 4, 1943) was a member of the Arizona State Senate from 2003 through 2009. He was first elected to the Senate in November 2002, and was re-elected twice, in 2004 and 2006. In 2008 Blendu decided to not seek re-election to the Senate and ran for a seat in the Arizona House of Representatives in the same district. However, he lost to Steve Montenegro and Jerry Weiers in the Republican primary.
