= Meg Burton Cahill =

American politician

Member of the Arizona Senate from the 17th district
- In office January 2007 – January 2011

Member of the Arizona House of Representatives from the 17th district
- In office January 2000 – January 2007

Personal details
- Born: March 8, 1954 (age 72) Salem, New Jersey
- Party: Democratic
- Spouse: Dennis
- Education: Arizona State University
- Occupation: Ceramic artist

Margaret J. Burton Cahill (born March 8, 1954) is an American Democratic politician from Tempe, Arizona. She has served as Arizona State Senator for District 17 until 2011. Earlier she was a member of the Arizona House of Representatives from 2000 through 2006.

Cahill is currently running for Justice of the Peace in the University Lakes Justice Precinct.

She is the former spouse of the late Dennis Cahill, who served for over a decade on the Tempe City Council.
