= Linda J. Lopez =

American politician

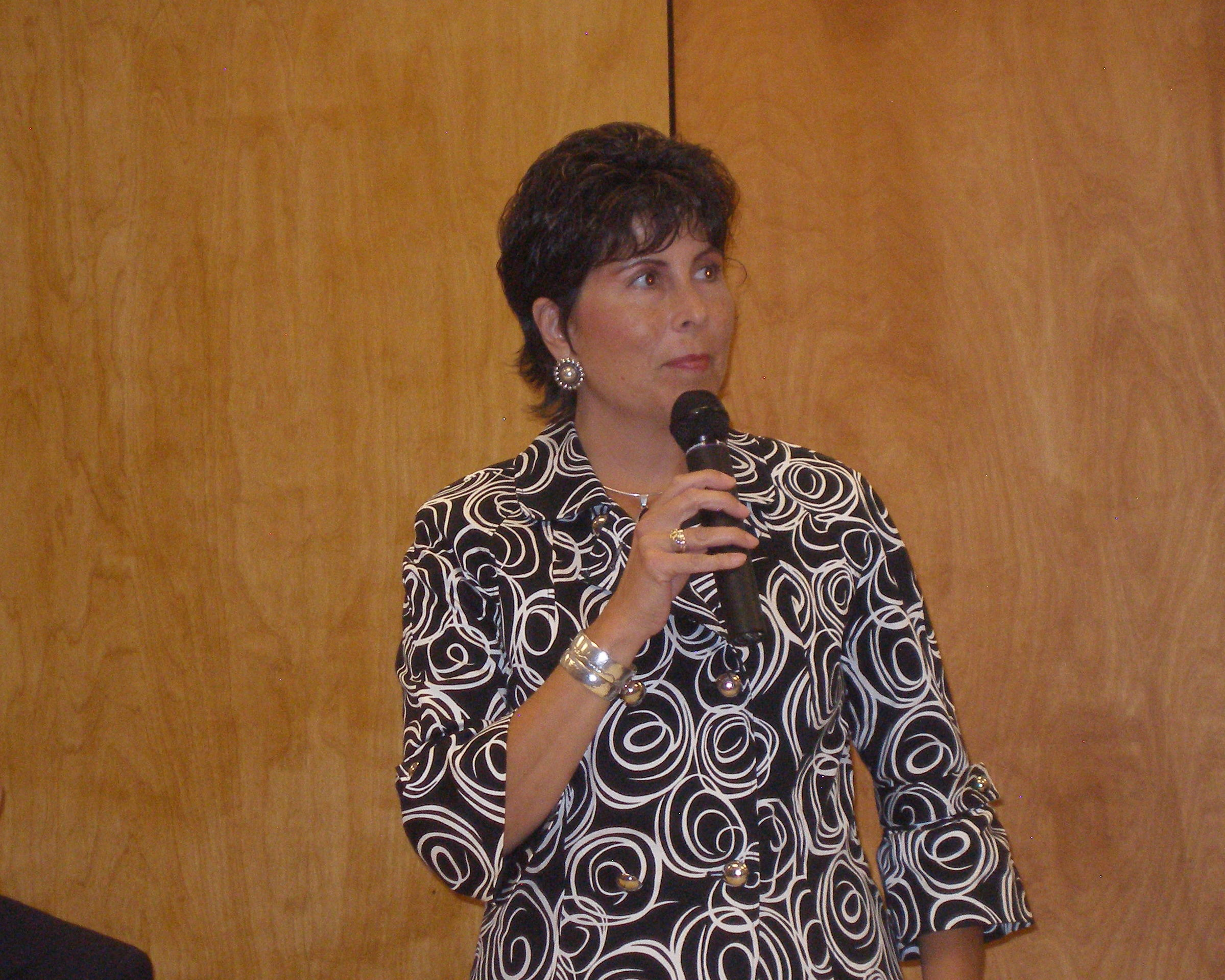

Member of the Arizona Senate from the 29th district
- In office January 12, 2009 – January 14, 2014
- Preceded by: Victor Soltero
- Succeeded by: Andrea Dalessandro

Personal details
- Born: September 10, 1948 (age 78) Logansport, Indiana
- Party: Democratic
- Education: University of Arizona

Linda J. Lopez (born September 10, 1948) is a Democratic former member of the Arizona Senate, representing the 29th District from 2009 to 2014. Lopez served in the Arizona House of Representatives from 2001 to 2009. She was the Assistant Minority Leader in the Senate.

Lopez resigned in January 2014.
