= Chuck Gray (Arizona politician) =

American politician (born 1958)

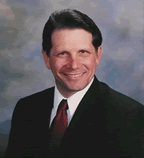

Member of the Arizona House of Representatives from the 19th district
- In office 2003–2006

Member of the Arizona Senate from the 19th district
- In office 2007–2011

Personal details
- Born: January 20, 1958 (age 68) Mesa, Arizona, U.S.
- Party: Republican
- Spouse: Connie Jones
- Children: 5
- Occupation: Retired Police Officer / Entrepreneur
- Profession: Politician, Businessman

Charles Dale Gray (born January 20, 1958) is an American author and politician who served as a member of the Arizona House of Representatives and a member of the Arizona Senate from 2003-2006 and 2007-2011, respectively. During his tenure in the Arizona Senate, Gray served as the majority leader of the Republican caucus. Before entering politics, he was a police officer for the city of Mesa, Arizona. Gray is the author of Living the American Dream, a book published in 2013. He is the father of five children and currently resides in Queen Creek, Arizona.

== Early life ==
Chuck Gray was born and raised in Mesa, Arizona. At the age of 19, Gray served a mission for the Church of Jesus Christ of Latter-day Saints in Spain where he learned to speak fluent Spanish. After serving as a missionary, Gray attended Mesa Community College, where he met his future wife, Connie Jones. They were married and are now parents of five children and multiple grandchildren.

== Career ==
=== Law enforcement career ===
In 1990, Gray fulfilled his lifelong dream of becoming a police officer upon joining the Mesa Police department, where he served for 10 years. As a police officer, Gray worked as a patrol officer, a field training officer, a detective, as well as a translator for the department due to his knowledge of Spanish. After leaving Mesa Police Department, Gray took on a full-time position with an internet company that he had founded in 1997—selling automotive accessories around the world.

=== Political career ===
In 2002, Gray decided to run for the Arizona House of Representatives. He received the second-most votes, behind Gary Pierce, and advanced to the general election, where he and Gary Pierce were elected to represent Arizona's 19th district in the House of Representatives. He was re-elected in 2004.

In 2006, Gray ran for and was elected to serve in the Arizona Senate. He was re-elected in 2008. During his time in the Arizona State Senate, he served as the majority leader of the Republican caucus.

In January 2020, Gray announced his bid for Pinal County Supervisor, touting his experience in the Arizona Legislature and vision for SanTan Valley.

== Electoral history ==
Arizona House of Representatives election primaries, 2002: 19th District
Party	Candidate	Votes	%	±%
Republican	Chuck Gray	7,139	29.3	
Republican	Louise Daggs	3,938	16.1	
Republican	Leslie Kelly	5,180	21.2	
Republican	Gary Pierce	8,141	33.4	

Arizona House of Representatives elections, 2002: 19th District
Party	Candidate	Votes	%	±%
Republican	Chuck Gray	31,991	54.8	0
Republican	Gary Pierce	26,432	45.2	0

Arizona House of Representatives election primaries, 2004: 19th District
Party	Candidate	Votes	%	±%
Republican	Chuck Gray	10,870	49.3	+20.0
Republican	Gary Pierce	11,186	50.7	+17.3

Arizona House of Representatives elections, 2004: 19th District
Party	Candidate	Votes	%	±%
Republican	Chuck Gray	45,407	51.6	−3.2
Republican	Gary Pierce	42,644	48.4	+3.2

Note: For each of the elections described above, no Democratic candidates filed to run. Further, Arizona House districts are multi-member districts, meaning that the top 2 vote receivers for each party advance to the general election and the top 2 vote receivers win the election.

Arizona State Senate election primaries, 2006: 19th District
Party	Candidate	Votes	%	±%
Republican	Chuck Gray	11,766	100%	0

Arizona State Senate elections, 2006: 19th District
Party	Candidate	Votes	%	±%
Republican	Chuck Gray	34,262	61.5	0
Democratic	Steven Zachary	21,450	38.5	0

Arizona State Senate election primaries, 2008: 19th District
Party	Candidate	Votes	%	±%
Republican	Chuck Gray	13,245	100%	0

Arizona State Senate elections, 2008: 19th District
Party	Candidate	Votes	%	±%
Republican	Chuck Gray	58,870	100%	+38.5
