= Jorge Luis Garcia =

American politician (1953–2010)

Member of the Arizona Senate from the 27th district
- In office 2003 – October 15, 2010
- Succeeded by: Maria Garcia

Personal details
- Born: September 10, 1953 Nogales, Sonora, Mexico
- Died: October 15, 2010 (aged 57)
- Party: Democratic
- Spouse: Maria Garcia
- Children: 3
- Education: University of Arizona, Arizona State University
- Profession: social worker

Jorge Luis Garcia (September 10, 1953 – October 15, 2010) was an American Democratic politician. He served as Arizona State Senator for District 27 beginning in 2003, where he held the title of Assistant Minority Leader. Previously he was a member of the Arizona House of Representatives from 1993 through 1996. He died of heart failure on October 15, 2010. He subsequently gained 519,926 votes (17.53%) in the November 2010 Arizona Corporation Commission election, coming in fourth place out of seven candidates.
