= 1998 Arizona House of Representatives election =

- November 3, 1998

All 60 seats in the Arizona House 31 seats needed for a majority

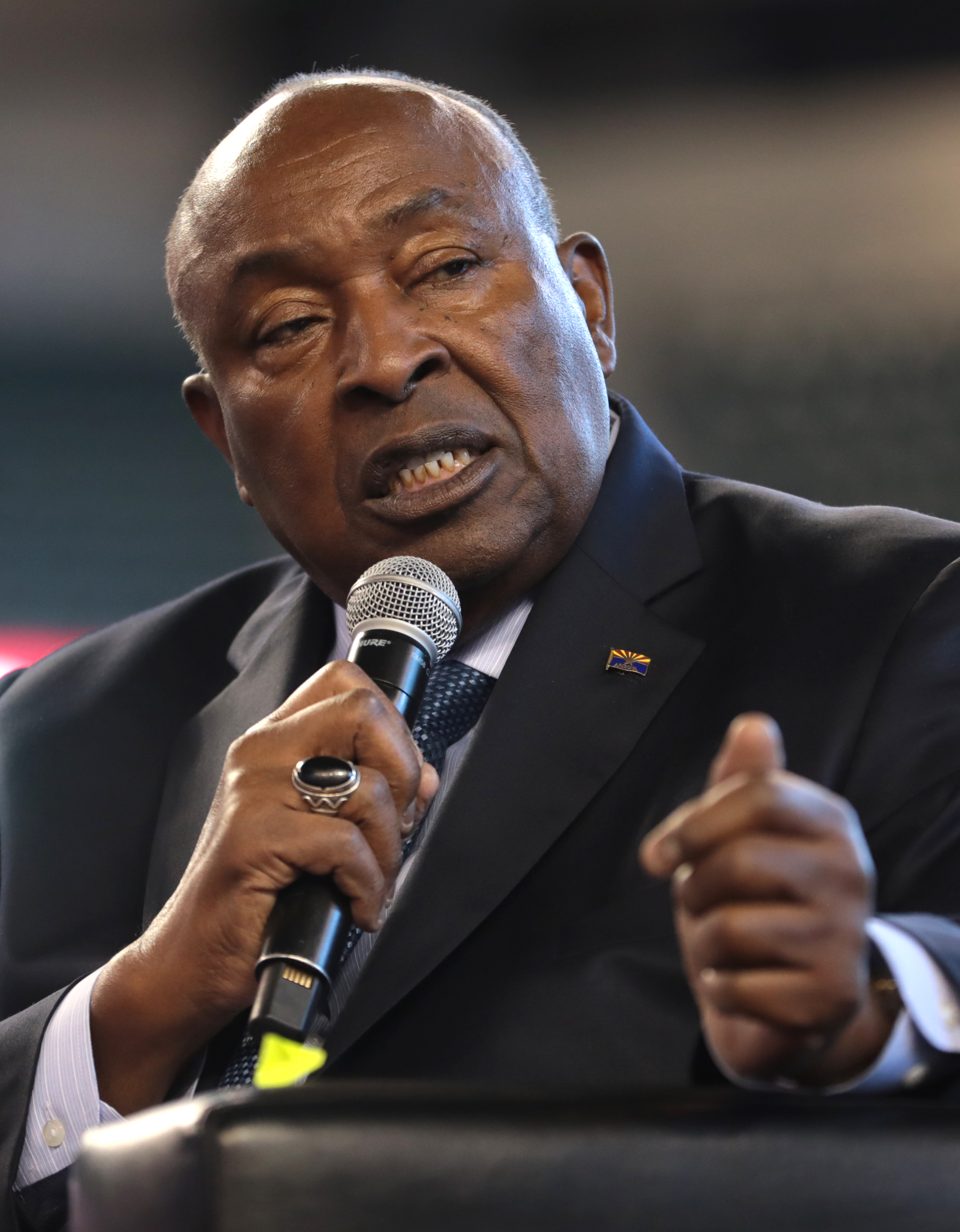
	Majority party	Minority party
Leader	Jeff Groscost	Art Hamilton (retired)
Party	Republican	Democratic
Leader's seat	30th - Mesa	22nd - Phoenix
Last election	38	22
Seats after	40	20
Seat change	▲2	▼2
- Results: Republican gain Republican hold Democratic hold
Speaker before election
Jeff Groscost (Note: Republican Don Aldridge was elected speaker on Monday, January 13, 1997. He resigned as speaker on October 20, 1997; however, he remained in his seat as a representative. Republican Jeff Groscost was elected to fill the Speaker vacancy on Wednesday, November 12, 1997.)
Republican
Elected Speaker
Jeff Groscost
Republican

The 1998 Arizona House of Representatives election took place on Tuesday, November 3, 1998, with the primary election held on Tuesday, September 8, 1998. Arizona voters elected all 60 members of the Arizona House of Representatives in multi-member districts to serve two-year terms.

The election coincided with United States national elections and Arizona state elections, including U.S. Senate, U.S. House, Governor, and Arizona Senate.

Following the previous election in 1996, Republicans held a 38-to-22-seat majority over Democrats. Republicans expanded their majority in 1998, winning 40 seats. At 20 members, Democrats saw a net loss of two seats. The newly elected members served in the 44th Arizona State Legislature, during which Republican Jeff Groscost was re-elected as Speaker of the Arizona House. (Note: Groscost was elected as Speaker for the 44th legislature, defeating Democratic Leader Representative Robert J. "Bob" McLendon, who was also nominated for Speaker. The vote tally for Speaker was: Groscost-41 votes to McLendon-19 votes (Democrat Sylvia Laughter of District 3 voted for the Republican Jeff Groscost to be Speaker).)

== Retiring Incumbents ==
=== Democrats ===
1. District 3: Benjamin Hanley
2. District 3: Jack C. Jackson (Note: Elected to the Arizona State Senate.)
3. District 8: Paul Newman (Note: Ran for Arizona Corporation Commission; lost to Tony West (R).)
4. District 22: Art Hamilton (Note: Ran for Arizona Secretary of State; lost to Betsey Bayless (R).)
5. District 23: Linda Aguirre (Note: Elected to the Arizona State Senate.)
6. District 23: David Armstead (Note: Ran for the Arizona State Senate; lost to Linda Aguirre in the Democratic primary.)

=== Republicans ===
1. District 1: Don Aldridge
2. District 1: Sue Lynch
3. District 12: Winifred "Freddy" Hershberger
4. District 19: David L. Eberhart
5. District 26: Tom Smith (Note: Elected to the Arizona State Senate.)
6. District 26: Robin Shaw (Note: Ran for the Arizona State Senate; lost to Tom Smith in the Republican primary.)
7. District 29: Lela Steffey

== Incumbent Defeated in General Election ==
=== Democrat ===
1. District 13: Brian Fagin

== Summary of results ==
Italics denote an open seat held by the incumbent party; bold text denotes a gain for a party.

District	Incumbent	Party	Elected Representative	Outcome
1st	Don Aldridge	Rep	Linda Binder	Rep Hold
1st	Sue Lynch	Rep	Barbara B. Blewster	Rep Hold
2nd	Joe Hart	Rep	Joe Hart	Rep Hold
2nd	John Verkamp	Rep	John Verkamp	Rep Hold
3rd	Benjamin Hanley	Dem	Sylvia Laughter	Dem Hold
3rd	Jack C. Jackson	Dem	**Tom Gordon**	**Rep Gain**
4th	Debra Brimhall	Rep	Debra Brimhall	Rep Hold
4th	Jake Flake	Rep	Jake Flake	Rep Hold
5th	Robert J. "Bob" McLendon	Dem	Robert J. "Bob" McLendon	Dem Hold
5th	Jim Carruthers	Rep	Jim Carruthers	Rep Hold
6th	Lori S. Daniels	Rep	Lori S. Daniels	Rep Hold
6th	Richard Kyle	Rep	Richard Kyle	Rep Hold
7th	Harry R. Clark	Dem	Harry R. Clark	Dem Hold
7th	Rebecca Rios	Dem	Rebecca Rios	Dem Hold
8th	Gail Griffin	Rep	Gail Griffin	Rep Hold
8th	Paul Newman	Dem	Mark Maiorana	Dem Hold
9th	Bill McGibbon	Rep	Bill McGibbon	Rep Hold
9th	Lou-Ann M. Preble	Rep	Lou-Ann M. Preble	Rep Hold
10th	Sally Ann Gonzales	Dem	Sally Ann Gonzales	Dem Hold
10th	Ramón O. Valadez	Dem	Ramón O. Valadez	Dem Hold
11th	Carmine Cardamone	Dem	Carmine Cardamone	Dem Hold
11th	Debora Norris	Dem	Debora Norris	Dem Hold
12th	Dan H. Schottel	Rep	Dan H. Schottel	Rep Hold
12th	Winifred "Freddy" Hershberger	Rep	Steve Huffman	Rep Hold
13th	Andy Nichols	Dem	Andy Nichols	Dem Hold
13th	Brian Fagin	Dem	**Kathleen Dunbar**	**Rep Gain**
14th	Herschella Horton	Dem	Herschella Horton	Dem Hold
14th	Marion L. Pickens	Dem	Marion L. Pickens	Dem Hold
15th	Jerry Overton	Rep	Jerry Overton	Rep Hold
15th	Lowell "Mike" Gleason (Note: Republican Mike Gleason was appointed by the Maricopa County Board of Supervisors on December 9, 1996 to fill the unexpired 1995-1996 term of Edwin "Ned" King (R), who died on November 28, 1996. Since Representative King died shortly after winning re-election in November 1996, Gleason was also appointed to fill the vacancy during the 1997-1998 legislative term as well and was sworn in as State Representative of District 15 on December 10, 1996.)	Rep	Lowell "Mike" Gleason	Rep Hold
16th	Jim Weiers	Rep	Jim Weiers	Rep Hold
16th	Linda Gray	Rep	Linda Gray	Rep Hold
17th	Robert "Bob" Burns	Rep	Robert "Bob" Burns	Rep Hold
17th	Jean McGrath	Rep	Jean McGrath	Rep Hold
18th	Barry Wong	Rep	Barry Wong	Rep Hold
18th	Susan Gerard	Rep	Susan Gerard	Rep Hold
19th	Roberta Voss	Rep	Roberta Voss	Rep Hold
19th	David L. Eberhart	Rep	Ted Carpenter	Rep Hold
20th	Kathi Foster	Dem	Kathi Foster	Dem Hold
20th	Bill Brotherton (Note: Democrat William L. "Bill" Brotherton, Jr. was appointed by the Maricopa County Board of Supervisors on March 20, 1998 to fill the unexpired term of Elise Salinger (D), who died on March 16, 1998. Representative Brotherton was sworn in as State Representative of District 20 on March 23, 1998.)	Dem	Bill Brotherton	Dem Hold
21st	Marilyn Jarrett	Rep	Marilyn Jarrett	Rep Hold
21st	Dean Cooley	Rep	Dean Cooley	Rep Hold
22nd	John A. Loredo	Dem	John A. Loredo	Dem Hold
22nd	Art Hamilton	Dem	Richard Miranda	Dem Hold
23rd	Linda Aguirre	Dem	Leah Landrum	Dem Hold
23rd	David Armstead	Dem	Carlos Avelar	Dem Hold
24th	Tom Horne	Rep	Tom Horne	Rep Hold
24th	Barbara Leff	Rep	Barbara Leff	Rep Hold
25th	Ken Cheuvront	Dem	Ken Cheuvront	Dem Hold
25th	Christine Weason	Dem	Christine Weason	Dem Hold
26th	Tom Smith	Rep	Jeff Hatch-Miller	Rep Hold
26th	Robin Shaw	Rep	Steve May	Rep Hold
27th	Laura Knaperek	Rep	Laura Knaperek	Rep Hold
27th	Mike Gardner	Rep	Mike Gardner	Rep Hold
28th	Carolyn S. Allen	Rep	Carolyn S. Allen	Rep Hold
28th	Wes Marsh	Rep	Wes Marsh	Rep Hold
29th	Mark Anderson	Rep	Mark Anderson	Rep Hold
29th	Lela Steffey (Note: Republican Lela Steffey was appointed by the Maricopa County Board of Supervisors on January 16, 1997 to fill the unexpired term of Paul Mortensen (R), who did not submit certificate of election to the House. Representative Steffey was sworn in as State Representative of District 29 on January 17, 1997.)	Rep	Wayne Gardner (Note: Republican Representative Wayne L. Gardner resigned on Friday, June 2, 2000. Galen M. Updike (R) was appointed by the Maricopa County Board of Supervisors on June 6, 2000 to fill the unexpired term of Wayne L. Gardner (R). Representative Updike was sworn in as State Representative of District 29 on June 8, 2000.)	Rep Hold
30th	Jeff Groscost	Rep	Jeff Groscost	Rep Hold
30th	Karen S. Johnson	Rep	Karen S. Johnson	Rep Hold

== Detailed results ==
Sources for election results:

=== District 1 ===
Primary Election Results
Party	Candidate	Votes	%
Republican Party Primary Results
Republican	Linda Binder	8,024	27.75%
Republican	Barbara B. Blewster	7,720	26.69%
Republican	Harvey C. Skoog	6,823	23.59%
Republican	David R. Spence	6,353	21.97%
Total votes		28,920	100.00%
Democratic Party Primary Results
Democratic	Kathy Fredricks	4,955	100.00%
Total votes		4,955	100.00%

General Election Results
Party	Candidate	Votes	%
Republican	Linda Binder	30,186	39.98%
Republican	Barbara B. Blewster	25,725	34.07%
Democratic	Kathy Fredricks	19,595	25.95%
Total votes		75,506	100.00%
Republican hold			
Republican hold			

=== District 2 ===
Primary Election Results
Party	Candidate	Votes	%
Republican Party Primary Results
Republican	John Verkamp (incumbent)	6,147	52.44%
Republican	Joe Hart (incumbent)	5,574	47.56%
Total votes		11,721	100.00%
Democratic Party Primary Results
Democratic	Richard Swanson	2,910	100.00%
Total votes		2,910	100.00%

General Election Results
Party	Candidate	Votes	%
Republican	John Verkamp (incumbent)	23,375	40.71%
Republican	Joe Hart (incumbent)	18,144	31.60%
Democratic	Richard "Cowboy" Swanson	15,903	27.69%
Total votes		57,422	100.00%
Republican hold			
Republican hold			

=== District 3 ===
Primary Election Results
Party	Candidate	Votes	%
Democratic Party Primary Results
Democratic	Sylvia Laughter (Note: The candidate ran a write-in campaign.)	479	33.22%
Democratic	D. Watchman (Note: Despite coming in second place in the Democratic primary as a write-in candidate, D. Watchman did not advance to the general election.)	391	27.12%
Democratic	Gilene Begay	201	13.94%
Democratic	Ken Hallock	174	12.07%
Democratic	Cyndy White Taylor	110	7.63%
Democratic	Steven Kee	47	3.26%
Democratic	Freddie Howard	40	2.77%
Total votes		1,442	100.00%
Republican Party Primary Results
Republican	Dean Slavens	298	43.38%
Republican	Tom Gordon	227	33.04%
Republican	Ron Etcitty	138	20.09%
Republican	Gerri M. Goldtooth	24	3.49%
Total votes		687	100.00%

General Election Results
Party	Candidate	Votes	%
Democratic	Sylvia Laughter	20,841	59.24%
Republican	Tom Gordon	7,482	21.27%
Republican	Dean Slavens	6,302	17.91%
Republican	Leonard Chee	492	1.40%
Democratic	Beverly Becenti-Pigman	61	0.17%
Total votes		35,178	100.00%
Democratic hold			
Republican gain from Democratic			

=== District 4 ===
Primary Election Results
Party	Candidate	Votes	%
Republican Party Primary Results
Republican	Jake Flake (incumbent)	5,530	50.25%
Republican	Debra Brimhall (incumbent)	5,475	49.75%
Total votes		11,005	100.00%
Democratic Party Primary Results
Democratic	Janice Chilton	7,279	40.82%
Democratic	David Rodriguez	3,966	22.24%
Democratic	Albert Gugenberger	3,683	20.65%
Democratic	Lynn C. Heglie	2,906	16.29%
Total votes		17,834	100.00%

General Election Results
Party	Candidate	Votes	%
Republican	Jake Flake (incumbent)	20,817	30.90%
Republican	Debra Brimhall (incumbent)	19,690	29.23%
Democratic	Janice "Jan" Chilton	16,925	25.13%
Democratic	David "Dave" Rodriguez	9,927	14.74%
Total votes		67,359	100.00%
Republican hold			
Republican hold			

=== District 5 ===
Primary Election Results
Party	Candidate	Votes	%
Democratic Party Primary Results
Democratic	Robert J. McLendon (incumbent)	4,714	100.00%
Total votes		4,714	100.00%
Republican Party Primary Results
Republican	Jim Carruthers (incumbent)	5,079	100.00%
Total votes		5,079	100.00%

General Election Results
Party	Candidate	Votes	%
Democratic	Robert J. "Bob" McLendon (incumbent)	13,689	51.75%
Republican	Jim Carruthers (incumbent)	12,761	48.25%
Total votes		26,450	100.00%
Democratic hold			
Republican hold			

=== District 6 ===
Primary Election Results
Party	Candidate	Votes	%
Republican Party Primary Results
Republican	Lori S. Daniels (incumbent)	5,062	38.55%
Republican	Richard Kyle (incumbent)	4,176	31.80%
Republican	David J. Crete Jr.	3,893	29.65%
Total votes		13,131	100.00%
Democratic Party Primary Results
Democratic	Tom Kennedy	1,733	100.00%
Total votes		1,733	100.00%
Libertarian Party Primary Results
Libertarian	Floyd Shackelford	59	100.00%
Total votes		59	100.00%

General Election Results
Party	Candidate	Votes	%
Republican	Lori S. Daniels (incumbent)	24,459	36.38%
Republican	Richard Kyle (incumbent)	21,297	31.68%
Democratic	Tom Kennedy	17,760	26.42%
Libertarian	Floyd Shackelford	3,712	5.52%
Total votes		67,228	100.00%
Republican hold			
Republican hold			

=== District 7 ===
Primary Election Results
Party	Candidate	Votes	%
Democratic Party Primary Results
Democratic	Rebecca Rios (incumbent)	5,819	55.37%
Democratic	Harry R. Clark (incumbent)	4,690	44.63%
Total votes		10,509	100.00%

General Election Results
Party	Candidate	Votes	%
Democratic	Rebecca Rios (incumbent)	13,716	51.86%
Democratic	Harry R. Clark (incumbent)	12,733	48.14%
Total votes		26,449	100.00%
Democratic hold			
Democratic hold			

=== District 8 ===
Primary Election Results
Party	Candidate	Votes	%
Democratic Party Primary Results
Democratic	Bobby Lugo	5,427	55.21%
Democratic	Mark Maiorana	4,403	44.79%
Total votes		9,830	100.00%
Republican Party Primary Results
Republican	Gail Griffin (incumbent)	2,924	60.95%
Republican	Bill Morrison	1,873	39.05%
Total votes		4,797	100.00%

General Election Results
Party	Candidate	Votes	%
Republican	Gail Griffin (incumbent)	12,718	30.79%
Democratic	Mark "Mark" Maiorana	10,000	24.21%
Democratic	Bobby Lugo	9,864	23.88%
Republican	Bill Morrison	8,725	21.12%
Total votes		41,307	100.00%
Republican hold			
Democratic hold			

=== District 9 ===
Primary Election Results
Party	Candidate	Votes	%
Republican Party Primary Results
Republican	Bill McGibbon (incumbent)	7,347	38.54%
Republican	Lou-Ann M. Preble (incumbent)	6,496	34.08%
Republican	Jonathan Lee Paton	5,218	27.38%
Total votes		19,061	100.00%

General Election Results
Party	Candidate	Votes	%
Republican	Lou-Ann M. Preble (incumbent)	27,368	50.70%
Republican	Bill McGibbon (incumbent)	26,612	49.30%
Total votes		53,980	100.00%
Republican hold			
Republican hold			

=== District 10 ===
Primary Election Results
Party	Candidate	Votes	%
Democratic Party Primary Results
Democratic	Sally Ann Gonzales (incumbent)	2,569	54.02%
Democratic	Ramón O. Valadez (incumbent)	2,187	45.98%
Total votes		4,756	100.00%

General Election Results
Party	Candidate	Votes	%
Democratic	Sally Ann Gonzales (incumbent)	11,761	54.87%
Democratic	Ramón O. Valadez (incumbent)	9,672	45.13%
Total votes		21,433	100.00%
Democratic hold			
Democratic hold			

=== District 11 ===
Primary Election Results
Party	Candidate	Votes	%
Democratic Party Primary Results
Democratic	Debora Norris (incumbent)	3,368	55.07%
Democratic	Carmine Cardamone (incumbent)	2,748	44.93%
Total votes		6,116	100.00%

General Election Results
Party	Candidate	Votes	%
Democratic	Debora Norris (incumbent)	14,765	54.60%
Democratic	Carmine Cardamone (incumbent)	12,275	45.40%
Total votes		27,040	100.00%
Democratic hold			
Democratic hold			

=== District 12 ===
Primary Election Results
Party	Candidate	Votes	%
Republican Party Primary Results
Republican	Dan H. Schottel (incumbent)	6,138	39.06%
Republican	Steve Huffman	5,132	32.66%
Republican	John C. Scott Ulm	4,443	28.28%
Total votes		15,713	100.00%
Democratic Party Primary Results
Democratic	Mark Osterloh	3,269	50.40%
Democratic	Andy J. Morales	3,217	49.60%
Total votes		6,486	100.00%

General Election Results
Party	Candidate	Votes	%
Republican	Steve Huffman	23,101	28.18%
Republican	Dan H. Schottel (incumbent)	22,518	27.47%
Democratic	Mark Osterloh	18,801	22.93%
Democratic	Andy J. Morales	17,557	21.42%
Total votes		81,977	100.00%
Republican hold			
Republican hold			

=== District 13 ===
Primary Election Results
Party	Candidate	Votes	%
Democratic Party Primary Results
Democratic	Andy Nichols (incumbent)	5,190	56.88%
Democratic	Brian Fagin (incumbent)	3,934	43.12%
Total votes		9,124	100.00%
Republican Party Primary Results
Republican	Kathleen Dunbar	6,846	100.00%
Total votes		6,846	100.00%

General Election Results
Party	Candidate	Votes	%
Democratic	Andy Nichols (incumbent)	19,753	34.64%
Republican	Kathleen Dunbar	19,611	34.40%
Democratic	Brian Fagin (incumbent)	17,653	30.96%
Total votes		57,017	100.00%
Democratic hold			
Republican gain from Democratic			

=== District 14 ===
Primary Election Results
Party	Candidate	Votes	%
Democratic Party Primary Results
Democratic	Herschella Horton (incumbent)	3,550	50.84%
Democratic	Marion L. Pickens (incumbent)	3,433	49.16%
Total votes		6,983	100.00%
Republican Party Primary Results
Republican	Sam Ramirez	4,364	100.00%
Total votes		4,364	100.00%
Libertarian Party Primary Results
Libertarian	Ed Kahn	110	100.00%
Total votes		110	100.00%

General Election Results
Party	Candidate	Votes	%
Democratic	Herschella Horton (incumbent)	15,563	33.63%
Democratic	Marion L. Pickens (incumbent)	14,963	32.34%
Republican	Sam Ramirez	11,919	25.76%
Libertarian	Ed Kahn	3,828	8.27%
Total votes		46,273	100.000%
Democratic hold			
Democratic hold			

=== District 15 ===
Primary Election Results
Party	Candidate	Votes	%
Republican Party Primary Results
Republican	Jerry Overton (incumbent)	9,008	57.78%
Republican	Lowell Gleason (incumbent)	6,582	42.22%
Total votes		15,590	100.00%
Democratic Party Primary Results
Democratic	Bunny Goldfarb	3,092	100.00%
Total votes		3,092	100.00%

General Election Results
Party	Candidate	Votes	%
Republican	Jerry Overton (incumbent)	26,201	40.24%
Republican	Lowell "Mike" Gleason (incumbent)	22,587	34.69%
Democratic	Bunny Goldfarb	16,319	25.06%
Total votes		65,107	100.00%
Republican hold			
Republican hold			

=== District 16 ===
Primary Election Results
Party	Candidate	Votes	%
Republican Party Primary Results
Republican	Linda Gray (incumbent)	4,138	50.97%
Republican	Jim Weiers (incumbent)	3,980	49.03%
Total votes		8,118	100.00%
Democratic Party Primary Results
Democratic	Robin Schneider	1,700	56.61%
Democratic	Dorothy Hankins Schultz	1,303	43.39%
Total votes		3,003	100.00%

General Election Results
Party	Candidate	Votes	%
Republican	Linda Gray (incumbent)	15,053	30.49%
Republican	Jim Weiers (incumbent)	14,858	30.09%
Democratic	Robin Schneider	11,180	22.64%
Democratic	Dorothy Hankins Schultz	8,287	16.78%
Total votes		49,378	100.00%
Republican hold			
Republican hold			

=== District 17 ===
Primary Election Results
Party	Candidate	Votes	%
Republican Party Primary Results
Republican	Robert Burns (incumbent)	6,418	56.89%
Republican	Jean McGrath (incumbent)	4,864	43.11%
Total votes		11,282	100.00%
Democratic Party Primary Results
Democratic	Kenneth J. Thomas	2,588	52.97%
Democratic	Leonard A. Clark	2,298	47.03%
Total votes		4,886	100.00%

General Election Results
Party	Candidate	Votes	%
Republican	Robert "Bob" Burns (incumbent)	17,625	30.71%
Republican	Jean McGrath (incumbent)	16,499	28.75%
Democratic	Kenneth J. Thomas	11,935	20.80%
Democratic	Leonard A. Clark	11,332	19.75%
Total votes		57,391	100.00%
Republican hold			
Republican hold			

=== District 18 ===
Primary Election Results
Party	Candidate	Votes	%
Republican Party Primary Results
Republican	Susan Gerard (incumbent)	7,121	39.08%
Republican	Barry Wong (incumbent)	5,917	32.47%
Republican	Jerry Harris	5,184	28.45%
Total votes		18,222	100.00%

General Election Results
Party	Candidate	Votes	%
Republican	Susan Gerard (incumbent)	23,413	54.17%
Republican	Barry Wong (incumbent)	19,811	45.83%
Total votes		43,224	100.00%
Republican hold			
Republican hold			

=== District 19 ===
Primary Election Results
Party	Candidate	Votes	%
Republican Party Primary Results
Republican	Roberta Voss (incumbent)	5,454	28.17%
Republican	Ted Carpenter	4,427	22.86%
Republican	John Hughes	3,854	19.90%
Republican	Ephram Cordova	3,125	16.14%
Republican	Frank Davidson	2,504	12.93%
Total votes		19,364	100.00%

General Election Results
Party	Candidate	Votes	%
Republican	Ted Carpenter	28,462	54.59%
Republican	Roberta Voss (incumbent)	23,673	45.41%
Total votes		52,135	100.00%
Republican hold			
Republican hold			

=== District 20 ===
Primary Election Results
Party	Candidate	Votes	%
Democratic Party Primary Results
Democratic	Kathi Foster (incumbent)	1,842	57.29%
Democratic	Bill Brotherton (incumbent)	1,373	42.71%
Total votes		3,215	100.00%

General Election Results
Party	Candidate	Votes	%
Democratic	Kathi Foster (incumbent)	10,039	53.78%
Democratic	Bill Brotherton (incumbent)	8,627	46.22%
Total votes		18,666	100.00%
Democratic hold			
Democratic hold			

=== District 21 ===
Primary Election Results
Party	Candidate	Votes	%
Republican Party Primary Results
Republican	Marilyn Jarrett (incumbent)	6,073	51.53%
Republican	Dean Cooley (incumbent)	5,712	48.47%
Total votes		11,785	100.00%

General Election Results
Party	Candidate	Votes	%
Republican	Dean Cooley (incumbent)	22,590	50.16%
Republican	Marilyn Jarrett (incumbent)	22,447	49.84%
Total votes		45,037	100.00%
Republican hold			
Republican hold			

=== District 22 ===
Primary Election Results
Party	Candidate	Votes	%
Democratic Party Primary Results
Democratic	Richard Miranda	2,315	42.75%
Democratic	John A. Loredo (incumbent)	1,838	33.94%
Democratic	Earl V. Wilcox	1,262	23.31%
Total votes		5,415	100.00%
Republican Party Primary Results
Republican	John Atkins	988	100.00%
Total votes		988	100.00%

General Election Results
Party	Candidate	Votes	%
Democratic	Richard Miranda	6,114	41.83%
Democratic	John A. Loredo (incumbent)	5,181	35.44%
Republican	John Atkins	3,323	22.73%
Total votes		14,618	100.00%
Democratic hold			
Democratic hold			

=== District 23 ===
Primary Election Results
Party	Candidate	Votes	%
Democratic Party Primary Results
Democratic	Leah Landrum	2,290	42.42%
Democratic	Carlos Avelar	1,724	31.94%
Democratic	Isaac Serna	1,384	25.64%
Total votes		5,398	100.00%
Republican Party Primary Results
Republican	Mary Carr	842	100.00%
Total votes		842	100.00%

General Election Results
Party	Candidate	Votes	%
Democratic	Leah Landrum	6,837	43.34%
Democratic	Carlos Avelar	6,024	38.18%
Republican	Mary Carr	2,910	18.45%
Independent	James Bresnahan	5	0.03%
Total votes		15,776	100.00%
Democratic hold			
Democratic hold			

=== District 24 ===
Primary Election Results
Party	Candidate	Votes	%
Republican Party Primary Results
Republican	Tom Horne (incumbent)	5,632	58.66%
Republican	Barbara Leff (incumbent)	3,969	41.34%
Total votes		9,601	100.00%
Democratic Party Primary Results
Democratic	Jacqueline Gasser	1,595	52.87%
Democratic	Chris Klein	1,422	47.13%
Total votes		3,017	100.00%

General Election Results
Party	Candidate	Votes	%
Republican	Tom Horne (incumbent)	20,799	34.92%
Republican	Barbara Leff (incumbent)	19,149	32.15%
Democratic	Jacqueline "Jackie" Gasser	9,948	16.70%
Democratic	Chris Klein	9,668	16.23%
Total votes		59,564	100.00%
Republican hold			
Republican hold			

=== District 25 ===
Primary Election Results
Party	Candidate	Votes	%
Democratic Party Primary Results
Democratic	Ken Cheuvront (incumbent)	2,533	55.04%
Democratic	Christine Weason (incumbent)	2,069	44.96%
Total votes		4,602	100.00%
Republican Party Primary Results
Republican	Milton Wheat	3,805	100.00%
Total votes		3,805	100.00%
Libertarian Party Primary Results
Libertarian	John Buttrick	80	76.92%
Libertarian	Kent Van Cleave (Note: The candidate withdrew from the election.)	24	23.08%
Total votes		104	100.00%

General Election Results
Party	Candidate	Votes	%
Democratic	Ken Cheuvront (incumbent)	13,000	34.07%
Democratic	Christine Weason (incumbent)	11,519	30.19%
Republican	Milton Wheat	8,526	22.34%
Libertarian	John Buttrick	5,075	13.30%
Nonpartisan	Barry MacMurray	37	0.10%
Total votes		38,157	100.00%
Democratic hold			
Democratic hold			

=== District 26 ===
Primary Election Results
Party	Candidate	Votes	%
Republican Party Primary Results
Republican	Steve May	4,739	23.49%
Republican	Jeff Hatch-Miller	4,301	21.32%
Republican	Richard Horne	3,369	16.70%
Republican	John R. Mills	2,722	13.49%
Republican	William C. Jungermann	2,340	11.60%
Republican	James J. Lemmon	1,819	9.01%
Republican	Brunn W. Roysden Jr.	888	4.40%
Total votes		20,178	100.00%
Democratic Party Primary Results
Democratic	Karen Hofmeister	2,143	57.53%
Democratic	Billy Wrye	1,582	42.47%
Total votes		3,725	100.00%
Reform Party Primary Results
Reform	James E. Bourassa	8	100.00%
Total votes		8	100.00%

General Election Results
Party	Candidate	Votes	%
Republican	Jeff Hatch-Miller	18,999	31.07%
Republican	Steve May	18,946	30.99%
Democratic	Karen Hofmeister	12,375	20.24%
Democratic	Billy Wrye	9,608	15.71%
Reform	James E. Bourassa	1,217	1.99%
Total votes		61,145	100.00%
Republican hold			
Republican hold			

=== District 27 ===
Primary Election Results
Party	Candidate	Votes	%
Republican Party Primary Results
Republican	Laura Knaperek (incumbent)	4,839	50.07%
Republican	Mike Gardner (incumbent)	4,826	49.93%
Total votes		9,665	100.00%
Democratic Party Primary Results
Democratic	Tom Head	1,641	50.24%
Democratic	Paul Valach	1,625	49.76%
Total votes		3,266	100.00%

General Election Results
Party	Candidate	Votes	%
Republican	Laura Knaperek (incumbent)	18,354	31.25%
Republican	Mike Gardner (incumbent)	16,702	28.44%
Democratic	Tom Head	11,892	20.25%
Democratic	Paul Valach	11,785	20.07%
Total votes		58,733	100.00%
Republican hold			
Republican hold			

=== District 28 ===
Primary Election Results
Party	Candidate	Votes	%
Republican Party Primary Results
Republican	Carolyn S. Allen (incumbent)	8,321	52.97%
Republican	Wes Marsh (incumbent)	7,387	47.03%
Total votes		15,708	100.00%

General Election Results
Party	Candidate	Votes	%
Republican	Carolyn S. Allen (incumbent)	39,877	55.75%
Republican	Wes Marsh (incumbent)	31,646	44.25%
Total votes		71,523	100.00%
Republican hold			
Republican hold			

=== District 29 ===
Primary Election Results
Party	Candidate	Votes	%
Republican Party Primary Results
Republican	Mark Anderson (incumbent)	3,908	52.02%
Republican	Wayne Gardner	3,604	47.98%
Total votes		7,512	100.00%

General Election Results
Party	Candidate	Votes	%
Republican	Mark Anderson (incumbent)	14,131	56.07%
Republican	Wayne Gardner	11,073	43.93%
Total votes		25,204	100.00%
Republican hold			
Republican hold			

=== District 30 ===
Primary Election Results
Party	Candidate	Votes	%
Republican Party Primary Results
Republican	Jeff Groscost (incumbent)	7,695	50.78%
Republican	Karen S. Johnson (incumbent)	7,459	49.22%
Total votes		15,154	100.00%
Democratic Party Primary Results
Democratic	William Luck	1,832	100.00%
Total votes		1,832	100.00%

General Election Results
Party	Candidate	Votes	%
Republican	Karen S. Johnson (incumbent)	29,402	40.86%
Republican	Jeff Groscost (incumbent)	28,051	38.98%
Democratic	William "Bill" Luck	14,510	20.16%
Total votes		71,963	100.00%
Republican hold			
Republican hold			

== See also ==
- 1998 United States elections
- 1998 United States Senate election in Arizona
- 1998 United States House of Representatives elections in Arizona
- 1998 Arizona gubernatorial election
- 1998 Arizona Senate election
- 44th Arizona State Legislature
- Arizona House of Representatives
