= 1996 Arizona House of Representatives election =

- November 5, 1996

All 60 seats in the Arizona House 31 seats needed for a majority
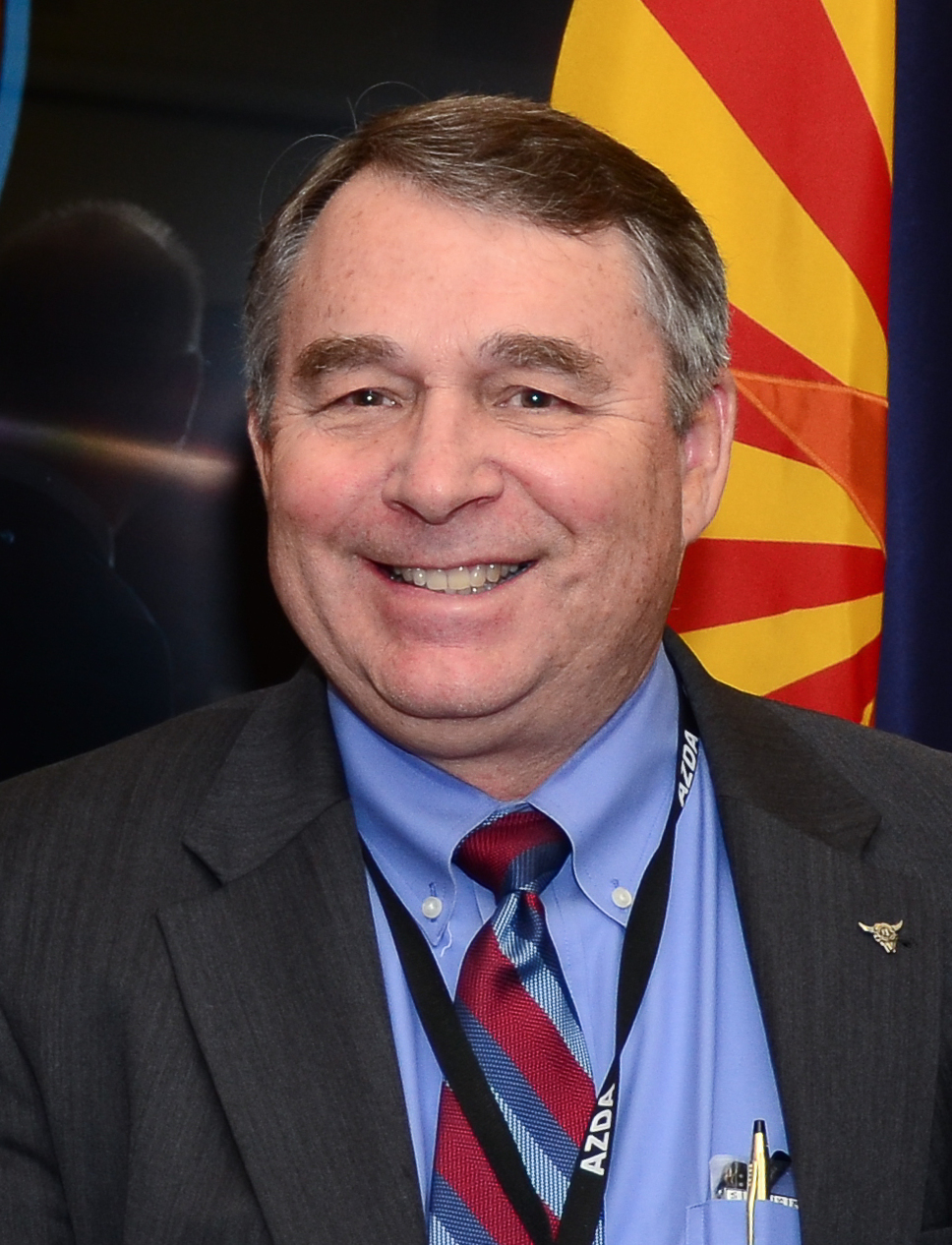

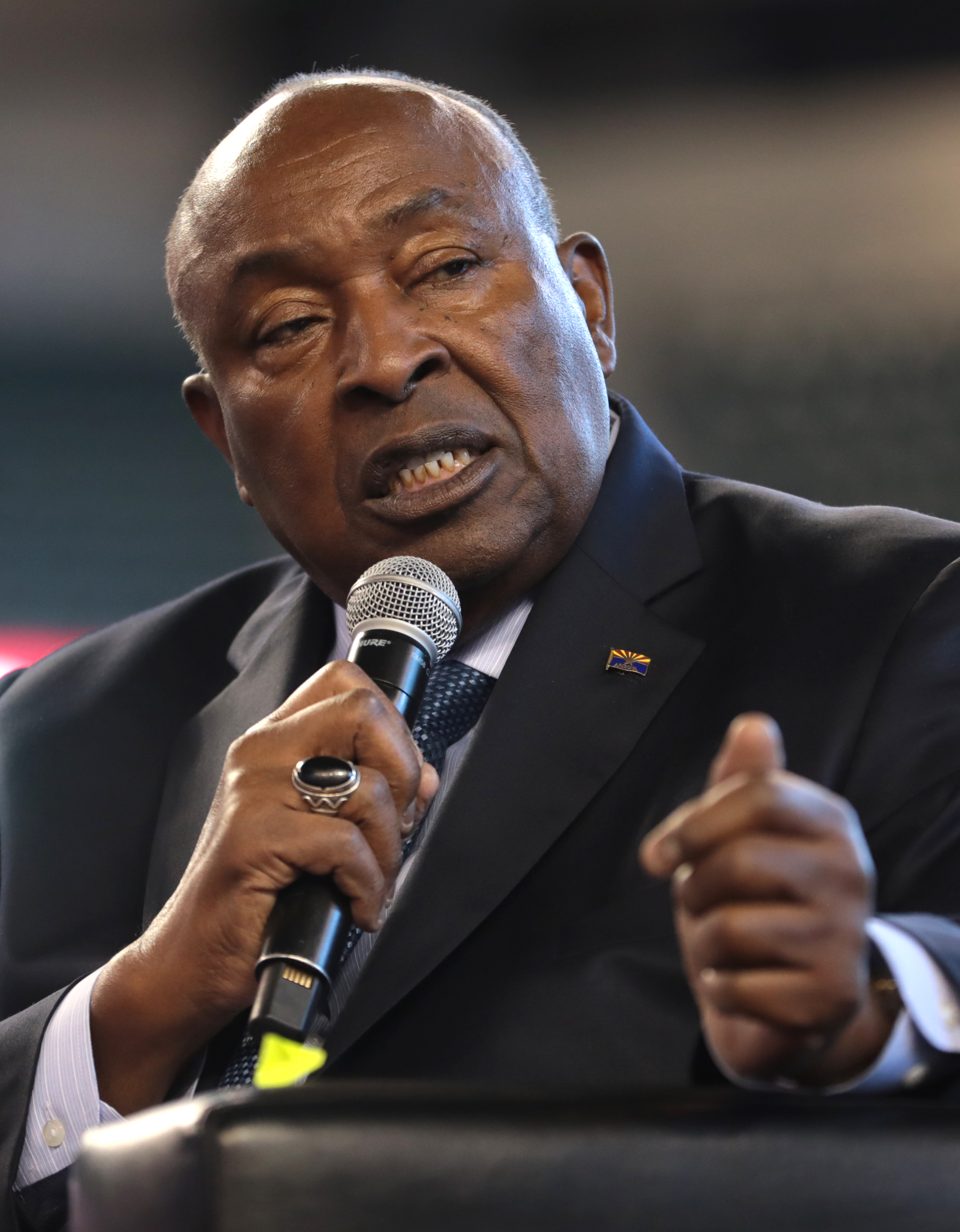
	Majority party	Minority party
Leader	Mark W. Killian (retired)	Art Hamilton
Party	Republican	Democratic
Leader's seat	30th - Mesa	22nd - Phoenix
Last election	38	22
Seats after	38	22
Seat change	Steady	Steady
- Results: Democratic hold Democratic gain Republican hold Republican gain
Speaker before election
Mark W. Killian
Republican
Elected Speaker
Don Aldridge (Note: Republican Don Aldridge was elected speaker on Monday, January 13, 1997. He resigned as speaker on October 20, 1997; however, he remained in his seat as a representative. Republican Jeff Groscost was elected to fill the Speaker vacancy on Wednesday, November 12, 1997.)
Republican

The 1996 Arizona House of Representatives election took place on Tuesday, November 5, 1996, with the primary election held on Tuesday, September 10, 1996. Arizona voters elected all 60 members of the Arizona House of Representatives in multi-member districts to serve two-year terms.

The election coincided with United States national elections and Arizona state elections, including U.S. President, U.S. House, and Arizona Senate.

Following the previous election in 1994, Republicans held a 38-to-22-seat majority over Democrats. Republicans maintained their majority in 1996, preserving a 38-to-22-seat advantage over Democrats.

The newly elected members served in the 43rd Arizona State Legislature, during which Republican Don Aldridge was originally chosen as Speaker. He was elected on Monday, January 13, 1997. He resigned as speaker on October 20, 1997; however, he remained in his seat as a representative. Republican Jeff Groscost was elected to fill the Speaker vacancy on Wednesday, November 12, 1997. (Note: Aldridge was elected as Speaker for the 43rd legislature, defeating Democratic Leader Representative Art Hamilton, who was also nominated for Speaker. The vote tally for Speaker was: Aldridge-37 votes to Hamilton-22 votes (with one vacancy in district 29 when Paul Mortensen didn't take the oath of office). Jeff Groscost was elected to fill the Speaker vacancy for the 43rd legislature, defeating Democratic Leader Representative Art Hamilton, who was also nominated for the Speaker vacancy. The vote tally was: Groscost-36 votes to Hamilton-19 votes (with 5 members not voting: Burns, Hanley, Kyle, Nichols, and Pickens).)

== Retiring Incumbents ==
=== Democrats ===
1. District 4: Jack A. Brown (Note: Elected to the Arizona State Senate.)
2. District 8: Ruben F. Ortega
3. District 10: Carmen Cajero
4. District 10: Phillip Hubbard
5. District 11: Elaine Richardson (Note: Elected to the Arizona State Senate.)
6. District 11: Jorge Luis Garcia (Note: Ran for the Arizona State Senate; lost to Elaine Richardson.)
7. District 13: George Cunningham (Note: Elected to the Arizona State Senate.)
8. District 22: Joe Eddie Lopez (Note: Elected to the Arizona State Senate.)

=== Republicans ===
1. District 4: David Christian Farnsworth (Note: Ran for the Arizona State Senate; lost to Jack A. Brown.)
2. District 5: Pat Conner (Note: Elected to the Arizona State Senate.)
3. District 6: Fulton Brock
4. District 19: Scott Bundgaard (Note: Elected to the Arizona State Senate.)
5. District 21: Russell "Rusty" Bowers (Note: Elected to the Arizona State Senate.)
6. District 24: Sue Grace (Note: Elected to the Arizona State Senate.)
7. District 24: Ernie Baird
8. District 30: Mark W. Killian

== Incumbent Defeated in Primary Election ==
=== Republican ===
1. District 16: Becky Jordan

== Incumbents Defeated in General Elections ==
=== Republicans ===
1. District 20: Robert Neil Blendu
2. District 25: Robert Updike

== Summary of results ==
Italics denote an open seat held by the incumbent party; bold text denotes a gain for a party.

District	Incumbent	Party	Elected Representative	Outcome
1st	Don Aldridge	Rep	Don Aldridge	Rep Hold
1st	Sue Lynch	Rep	Sue Lynch	Rep Hold
2nd	Joe Hart	Rep	Joe Hart	Rep Hold
2nd	John Verkamp	Rep	John Verkamp	Rep Hold
3rd	Benjamin Hanley	Dem	Benjamin Hanley	Dem Hold
3rd	Jack C. Jackson	Dem	Jack C. Jackson	Dem Hold
4th	David Christian Farnsworth	Rep	Debra L. Brimhall	Rep Hold
4th	Jack A. Brown	Dem	**Jake Flake**	**Rep Gain**
5th	Robert J. "Bob" McLendon	Dem	Robert J. "Bob" McLendon	Dem Hold
5th	Pat Conner	Rep	Jim Carruthers	Rep Hold
6th	Lori S. Daniels	Rep	Lori S. Daniels	Rep Hold
6th	Fulton Brock	Rep	Richard Kyle	Rep Hold
7th	Harry R. Clark	Dem	Harry R. Clark	Dem Hold
7th	Rebecca Rios	Dem	Rebecca Rios	Dem Hold
8th	Paul Newman	Dem	Paul Newman	Dem Hold
8th	Ruben F. Ortega	Dem	**Gail Griffin**	**Rep Gain**
9th	Bill McGibbon	Rep	Bill McGibbon	Rep Hold
9th	Lou-Ann M. Preble	Rep	Lou-Ann M. Preble	Rep Hold
10th	Carmen Cajero	Dem	Sally Ann Gonzales	Dem Hold
10th	Phillip Hubbard	Dem	Ramon O. Valadez	Dem Hold
11th	Elaine Richardson	Dem	Carmine Cardamone	Dem Hold
11th	Jorge Luis Garcia	Dem	Debora Norris	Dem Hold
12th	Dan Schottel	Rep	Dan Schottel	Rep Hold
12th	Winifred "Freddy" Hershberger	Rep	Winifred "Freddy" Hershberger	Rep Hold
13th	Andy Nichols	Dem	Andy Nichols	Dem Hold
13th	George Cunningham	Dem	Brian Fagin	Dem Hold
14th	Herschella Horton	Dem	Herschella Horton	Dem Hold
14th	Marion L. Pickens	Dem	Marion L. Pickens	Dem Hold
15th	Ned King	Rep	Ned King (Note: Republican Mike Gleason was appointed by the Maricopa County Board of Supervisors on December 9, 1996 to fill the unexpired 1995-1996 term of Edwin "Ned" King (R), who died on November 28, 1996. Since Representative King died shortly after winning re-election in November 1996, Gleason was also appointed to fill the vacancy during the 1997-1998 legislative term as well and was sworn in as State Representative of District 15 on December 10, 1996.)	Rep Hold
15th	Jerry Overton	Rep	Jerry Overton	Rep Hold
16th	Jim Weiers	Rep	Jim Weiers	Rep Hold
16th	Becky Jordan	Rep	Linda Gray	Rep Hold
17th	Robert "Bob" Burns	Rep	Robert "Bob" Burns	Rep Hold
17th	Jean McGrath	Rep	Jean McGrath	Rep Hold
18th	Barry Wong	Rep	Barry Wong	Rep Hold
18th	Susan Gerard	Rep	Susan Gerard	Rep Hold
19th	David L. Eberhart	Rep	David L. Eberhart	Rep Hold
19th	Scott Bundgaard	Rep	Roberta Voss	Rep Hold
20th	Kathi Foster	Dem	Kathi Foster	Dem Hold
20th	Robert Neil Blendu	Rep	**Elise Salinger** (Note: Democrat William L. "Bill" Brotherton, Jr. was appointed by the Maricopa County Board of Supervisors on March 20, 1998 to fill the unexpired term of Elise Salinger (D), who died on March 16, 1998. Representative Brotherton was sworn in as State Representative of District 20 on March 23, 1998.)	**Dem Gain**
21st	Marilyn Jarrett	Rep	Marilyn Jarrett	Rep Hold
21st	Russell "Rusty" Bowers	Rep	Dean Cooley	Rep Hold
22nd	Art Hamilton	Dem	Art Hamilton	Dem Hold
22nd	Joe Eddie Lopez	Dem	John A. Loredo	Dem Hold
23rd	Linda Aguirre	Dem	Linda Aguirre	Dem Hold
23rd	David Armstead	Dem	David Armstead	Dem Hold
24th	Sue Grace	Rep	Tom Horne	Rep Hold
24th	Ernie Baird	Rep	Barbara Leff	Rep Hold
25th	Ken Cheuvront	Dem	Ken Cheuvront	Dem Hold
25th	Robert Updike	Rep	**Christine Weason**	**Dem Gain**
26th	Tom Smith	Rep	Tom Smith	Rep Hold
26th	Robin Shaw	Rep	Robin Shaw	Rep Hold
27th	Laura Knaperek	Rep	Laura Knaperek	Rep Hold
27th	Mike Gardner	Rep	Mike Gardner	Rep Hold
28th	Carolyn S. Allen	Rep	Carolyn S. Allen	Rep Hold
28th	Wes Marsh	Rep	Wes Marsh	Rep Hold
29th	Mark Anderson	Rep	Mark Anderson	Rep Hold
29th	Paul Mortensen	Rep	Paul Mortensen (Note: Republican Lela Steffey was appointed by the Maricopa County Board of Supervisors on January 16, 1997 to fill the unexpired term of Paul Mortensen (R), who did not submit certificate of election to the House. Representative Steffey was sworn in as State Representative of District 29 on January 17, 1997.)	Rep Hold
30th	Jeff Groscost	Rep	Jeff Groscost	Rep Hold
30th	Mark W. Killian	Rep	Karen S. Johnson	Rep Hold

== Detailed results ==
Sources for election results:

=== District 1 ===
Primary Election Results
Party	Candidate	Votes	%
Republican Party Primary Results
Republican	Don Aldridge (incumbent)	11,869	35.00%
Republican	Sue Lynch (incumbent)	11,203	33.03%
Republican	Ken Bennett	6,712	19.79%
Republican	David G. Kurr	4,132	12.18%
Total votes		33,916	100.00%

General Election Results
Party	Candidate	Votes	%
Republican	Sue Lynch (incumbent)	41,765	50.67%
Republican	Don Aldridge (incumbent)	40,653	49.33%
Total votes		82,418	100.00%
Republican hold			
Republican hold			

=== District 2 ===
Primary Election Results
Party	Candidate	Votes	%
Republican Party Primary Results
Republican	John Verkamp (incumbent)	7,900	45.69%
Republican	Joe Hart (incumbent)	6,884	39.81%
Republican	Timothy D. Webb	2,507	14.50%
Total votes		17,291	100.00%
Libertarian Party Primary Results
Libertarian	Sunny Reid	38	54.29%
Libertarian	John S. Williams	32	45.71%
Total votes		70	100.00%

General Election Results
Party	Candidate	Votes	%
Republican	John Verkamp (incumbent)	35,953	42.27%
Republican	Joe Hart (incumbent)	31,979	37.59%
Libertarian	John S. Williams	8,853	10.41%
Libertarian	Sunny Reid	8,280	9.73%
Total votes		85,065	100.00%
Republican hold			
Republican hold			

=== District 3 ===
Primary Election Results
Party	Candidate	Votes	%
Democratic Party Primary Results
Democratic	Jack C. Jackson (incumbent)	6,845	38.42%
Democratic	Benjamin Hanley (incumbent)	4,759	26.71%
Democratic	Gilene Begay	3,486	19.57%
Democratic	Ellouise Dennison DeGroat	2,726	15.30%
Total votes		17,816	100.00%
Republican Party Primary Results
Republican	Ben Manuelito (Note: The candidate ran a write-in campaign.)	7	100.00%
Total votes		7	100.00%

General Election Results
Party	Candidate	Votes	%
Democratic	Benjamin Hanley (incumbent)	21,262	50.65%
Democratic	Jack C. Jackson (incumbent)	20,716	49.35%
Total votes		41,978	100.00%
Democratic hold			
Democratic hold			

=== District 4 ===
Primary Election Results
Party	Candidate	Votes	%
Democratic Party Primary Results
Democratic	Janice Chilton	5,928	23.45%
Democratic	Louis B. Ellsworth Jr.	5,493	21.73%
Democratic	David "Dave" Rodriguez	4,129	16.34%
Democratic	Mike Pollack	3,655	14.46%
Democratic	Donald J. Hess	3,493	13.82%
Democratic	Richard D. Lupke	2,576	10.19%
Total votes		25,274	100.00%
Republican Party Primary Results
Republican	Jake Flake	5,607	39.01%
Republican	Debra L. Brimhall	5,356	37.26%
Republican	Glen Galster	3,411	23.73%
Total votes		14,374	100.00%
Libertarian Party Primary Results
Libertarian	Michael Trent Haggard	10	100.00%
Total votes		10	100.00%

General Election Results
Party	Candidate	Votes	%
Republican	Jake Flake	22,786	26.53%
Republican	Debra L. Brimhall	21,733	25.30%
Democratic	Janice Chilton	20,379	23.73%
Democratic	Louis B. Ellsworth, Jr.	18,125	21.10%
Libertarian	Michael Trent Haggard	2,866	3.34%
Total votes		85,889	100.00%
Republican hold			
Republican gain from Democratic			

=== District 5 ===
Primary Election Results
Party	Candidate	Votes	%
Democratic Party Primary Results
Democratic	Robert J. "Bob" McLendon (incumbent)	5,542	99.28%
Democratic	Rodney Martin	40	0.72%
Total votes		5,582	100.00%
Republican Party Primary Results
Republican	Jim Carruthers	4,694	48.32%
Republican	T. O. Beach	3,163	32.56%
Republican	LaRoy F. Smith Sr.	1,858	19.13%
Total votes		9,715	100.00%

General Election Results
Party	Candidate	Votes	%
Democratic	Robert J. "Bob" McLendon (incumbent)	19,020	40.90%
Republican	Jim Carruthers	16,385	35.24%
Republican	T. O. Beach	11,097	23.86%
Total votes		46,502	100.00%
Democratic hold			
Republican hold			

=== District 6 ===
Primary Election Results
Party	Candidate	Votes	%
Republican Party Primary Results
Republican	Lori S. Daniels (incumbent)	4,675	32.15%
Republican	Richard Kyle	3,663	25.19%
Republican	Tom Chiodo	3,425	23.55%
Republican	James Walsh	1,842	12.67%
Republican	Darlene Fine Huntoon	936	6.44%
Total votes		14,541	100.00%
Democratic Party Primary Results
Democratic	Fred Santesteban	2,094	100.00%
Total votes		2,094	100.00%

General Election Results
Party	Candidate	Votes	%
Republican	Lori S. Daniels (incumbent)	35,972	38.55%
Republican	Richard Kyle	34,588	37.07%
Democratic	Fred Santesteban	22,750	24.38%
Total votes		93,310	100.00%
Republican hold			
Republican hold			

=== District 7 ===
Primary Election Results
Party	Candidate	Votes	%
Democratic Party Primary Results
Democratic	Rebecca Rios (incumbent)	5,946	52.19%
Democratic	Harry Clark (incumbent)	5,448	47.81%
Total votes		11,394	100.00%

General Election Results
Party	Candidate	Votes	%
Democratic	Rebecca Rios (incumbent)	18,267	52.71%
Democratic	Harry Clark (incumbent)	16,386	47.29%
Total votes		34,653	100.00%
Democratic hold			
Democratic hold			

=== District 8 ===
Primary Election Results
Party	Candidate	Votes	%
Democratic Party Primary Results
Democratic	Paul Newman (incumbent)	10,096	51.22%
Democratic	Aida Estellean Wick	5,259	26.68%
Democratic	Mark Maiorana	4,356	22.10%
Total votes		19,711	100.00%
Republican Party Primary Results
Republican	Gail Griffin	3,340	51.23%
Republican	Michael D. "Mike" Lunt	3,180	48.77%
Total votes		6,520	100.00%

General Election Results
Party	Candidate	Votes	%
Democratic	Paul Newman (incumbent)	17,848	32.06%
Republican	Gail Griffin	13,118	23.56%
Democratic	Aida Estellean Wick	12,856	23.09%
Republican	Michael D. "Mike" Lunt	11,852	21.29%
Total votes		55,674	100.00%
Democratic hold			
Republican gain from Democratic			

=== District 9 ===
Primary Election Results
Party	Candidate	Votes	%
Republican Party Primary Results
Republican	Lou-Ann M. Preble (incumbent)	7,894	37.91%
Republican	Bill McGibbon (incumbent)	7,659	36.78%
Republican	Harold W. Vangilder	5,270	25.31%
Total votes		20,823	100.00%

General Election Results
Party	Candidate	Votes	%
Republican	Lou-Ann M. Preble (incumbent)	35,579	52.65%
Republican	Bill McGibbon (incumbent)	31,995	47.35%
Total votes		67,574	100.00%
Republican hold			
Republican hold			

=== District 10 ===
Primary Election Results
Party	Candidate	Votes	%
Democratic Party Primary Results
Democratic	Ramon O. Valadez	3,830	33.79%
Democratic	Sally Ann Gonzales	3,307	29.18%
Democratic	Betty J. Liggins	2,586	22.82%
Democratic	Marilyn Rita Venne	1,611	14.21%
Total votes		11,334	100.00%
Republican Party Primary Results
Republican	Robert "Bob" Motta	1,745	100.00%
Total votes		1,745	100.00%

General Election Results
Party	Candidate	Votes	%
Democratic	Sally Ann Gonzales	15,466	43.16%
Democratic	Ramon O. Valadez	12,468	34.79%
Republican	Robert "Bob" Motta	7,899	22.04%
Total votes		35,833	100.00%
Democratic hold			
Democratic hold			

=== District 11 ===
Primary Election Results
Party	Candidate	Votes	%
Democratic Party Primary Results
Democratic	Debora Norris	4,143	25.33%
Democratic	Carmine Cardamone	3,889	23.78%
Democratic	Carlos Galvan "Charlie" Salaz Sr.	3,664	22.40%
Democratic	Douglas Martin	2,420	14.79%
Democratic	Mike Price	2,241	13.70%
Total votes		16,357	100.00%
Republican Party Primary Results
Republican	Steve L. Benefield	1,912	54.72%
Republican	Ora Mae Harn	1,582	45.28%
Total votes		3,494	100.00%

General Election Results
Party	Candidate	Votes	%
Democratic	Debora Norris	19,142	36.11%
Democratic	Carmine Cardamone	16,895	31.87%
Republican	Ora Mae Harn	8,746	16.50%
Republican	Steve L. Benefield	8,222	15.51%
Total votes		53,005	100.00%
Democratic hold			
Democratic hold			

=== District 12 ===
Primary Election Results
Party	Candidate	Votes	%
Republican Party Primary Results
Republican	Freddy Hershberger (incumbent)	7,601	38.81%
Republican	Dan Schottel (incumbent)	6,468	33.03%
Republican	Steve Huffman	5,514	28.16%
Total votes		19,583	100.00%
Democratic Party Primary Results
Democratic	Mark Osterloh	5,602	100.00%
Total votes		5,602	100.00%

General Election Results
Party	Candidate	Votes	%
Republican	Freddy Hershberger (incumbent)	35,388	39.34%
Republican	Dan Schottel (incumbent)	28,606	31.80%
Democratic	Mark Osterloh	25,952	28.85%
Total votes		89,946	100.00%
Republican hold			
Republican hold			

=== District 13 ===
Primary Election Results
Party	Candidate	Votes	%
Democratic Party Primary Results
Democratic	Andy Nichols (incumbent)	6,867	48.44%
Democratic	Brian Fagin	4,480	31.60%
Democratic	Colette Philip	2,829	19.96%
Total votes		14,176	100.00%
Republican Party Primary Results
Republican	Scott D. Kirtley	6,506	53.39%
Republican	D. "Shane" Wikfors	5,680	46.61%
Total votes		12,186	100.00%

General Election Results
Party	Candidate	Votes	%
Democratic	Andy Nichols (incumbent)	27,571	30.35%
Democratic	Brian Fagin	23,184	25.52%
Republican	Scott D. Kirtley	21,207	23.35%
Republican	D. "Shane" Wikfors	18,876	20.78%
Total votes		90,838	100.00%
Democratic hold			
Democratic hold			

=== District 14 ===
Primary Election Results
Party	Candidate	Votes	%
Democratic Party Primary Results
Democratic	Herschella Horton (incumbent)	5,494	50.75%
Democratic	Marion L. Pickens (incumbent)	5,331	49.25%
Total votes		10,825	100.00%
Republican Party Primary Results
Republican	Sharon Collins	4,966	55.98%
Republican	Charles H. "Chuck" Josephson	3,905	44.02%
Total votes		8,871	100.00%

General Election Results
Party	Candidate	Votes	%
Democratic	Marion L. Pickens (incumbent)	20,569	27.794%
Democratic	Herschella Horton (incumbent)	20,567	27.792%
Republican	Sharon Collins	17,986	24.304%
Republican	Charles H. "Chuck" Josephson	14,882	20.110%
Total votes		74,004	100.000%
Democratic hold			
Democratic hold			

=== District 15 ===
Primary Election Results
Party	Candidate	Votes	%
Republican Party Primary Results
Republican	Ned King (incumbent)	8,716	50.18%
Republican	Jerry Overton (incumbent)	8,653	49.82%
Total votes		17,369	100.00%
Democratic Party Primary Results
Democratic	Seymour Cuker	3,563	100.00%
Total votes		3,563	100.00%

General Election Results
Party	Candidate	Votes	%
Republican	Jerry Overton (incumbent)	30,430	38.62%
Republican	Ned King (incumbent)	28,368	36.01%
Democratic	Seymour Cuker	19,988	25.37%
Total votes		78,786	100.00%
Republican hold			
Republican hold			

=== District 16 ===
Primary Election Results
Party	Candidate	Votes	%
Republican Party Primary Results
Republican	Jim Weiers (incumbent)	4,770	34.97%
Republican	Linda Gray	4,162	30.52%
Republican	Becky Jordan	3,308	24.25%
Republican	Maxine Thompson	759	5.56%
Republican	Mary J. Michaelis	640	4.69%
Total votes		13,639	100.00%
Democratic Party Primary Results
Democratic	Robin Schneider	2,538	100.00%
Total votes		2,538	100.00%

General Election Results
Party	Candidate	Votes	%
Republican	Linda Gray	22,989	37.11%
Republican	Jim Weiers (incumbent)	20,525	33.13%
Democratic	Robin Schneider	18,439	29.76%
Total votes		61,953	100.00%
Republican hold			
Republican hold			

=== District 17 ===
Primary Election Results
Party	Candidate	Votes	%
Republican Party Primary Results
Republican	Robert "Bob" Burns (incumbent)	7,366	54.16%
Republican	Jean McGrath (incumbent)	6,235	45.84%
Total votes		13,601	100.00%

General Election Results
Party	Candidate	Votes	%
Republican	Robert "Bob" Burns (incumbent)	29,369	51.71%
Republican	Jean McGrath (incumbent)	27,428	48.29%
Total votes		56,797	100.00%
Republican hold			
Republican hold			

=== District 18 ===
Primary Election Results
Party	Candidate	Votes	%
Republican Party Primary Results
Republican	Barry Wong (incumbent)	6,433	33.72%
Republican	Susan Gerard (incumbent)	6,339	33.23%
Republican	Jerry Harris	6,306	33.05%
Total votes		19,078	100.00%
Democratic Party Primary Results
Democratic	Ray Villa	2,963	100.00%
Total votes		2,963	100.00%
Libertarian Party Primary Results
Libertarian	Ernest Hancock	48	53.93%
Libertarian	Donna Hancock (Note: Donna Hancock ran in the Libertarian Party primaries in both the state senator and state representative elections for district 18. In the general election, Donna Hancock only ran in the state senator race.)	41	46.07%
Total votes		89	100.00%

General Election Results
Party	Candidate	Votes	%
Republican	Susan Gerard (incumbent)	28,591	38.11%
Republican	Barry Wong (incumbent)	26,684	35.57%
Democratic	Ray Villa	15,083	20.11%
Libertarian	Ernest Hancock	3,545	4.73%
Natural Law	Ted Goldstein	1,116	1.49%
Total votes		75,019	100.00%
Republican hold			
Republican hold			

=== District 19 ===
Primary Election Results
Party	Candidate	Votes	%
Republican Party Primary Results
Republican	David L. Eberhart (incumbent)	5,925	35.37%
Republican	Roberta Voss	4,580	27.34%
Republican	Glenn Marion	4,433	26.46%
Republican	Robert T. Cavaca	1,814	10.83%
Total votes		16,752	100.00%
Libertarian Party Primary Results
Libertarian	Joe Susnjara	39	100.00%
Total votes		39	100.00%

General Election Results
Party	Candidate	Votes	%
Republican	Roberta Voss	36,008	45.43%
Republican	David L. Eberhart (incumbent)	35,240	44.46%
Libertarian	Joe Susnjara	8,011	10.11%
Total votes		79,259	100.00%
Republican hold			
Republican hold			

=== District 20 ===
Primary Election Results
Party	Candidate	Votes	%
Democratic Party Primary Results
Democratic	Kathi Foster (incumbent)	2,526	54.70%
Democratic	Elise Salinger	2,092	45.30%
Total votes		4,618	100.00%
Republican Party Primary Results
Republican	Robert Neil Blendu (incumbent)	2,424	54.77%
Republican	Jules Dembinski	2,002	45.23%
Total votes		4,426	100.00%
Libertarian Party Primary Results
Libertarian	John P. Wilde	38	100.00%
Total votes		38	100.00%

General Election Results
Party	Candidate	Votes	%
Democratic	Kathi Foster (incumbent)	13,385	29.63%
Democratic	Elise Salinger	11,594	25.66%
Republican	Robert Neil Blendu (incumbent)	9,941	22.00%
Republican	Jules Dembinski	8,814	19.51%
Libertarian	John P. Wilde	1,446	3.20%
Total votes		45,180	100.00%
Democratic hold			
Democratic gain from Republican			

=== District 21 ===
Primary Election Results
Party	Candidate	Votes	%
Republican Party Primary Results
Republican	Marilyn Jarrett (incumbent)	5,576	50.04%
Republican	Dean Cooley	5,566	49.96%
Total votes		11,142	100.00%
Democratic Party Primary Results
Democratic	Joan Fitz-Randolph	2,567	100.00%
Total votes		2,567	100.00%
Libertarian Party Primary Results
Libertarian	Scott Grainger	37	100.00%
Total votes		37	100.00%

General Election Results
Party	Candidate	Votes	%
Republican	Marilyn Jarrett (incumbent)	27,929	35.02%
Republican	Dean Cooley	25,487	31.96%
Democratic	Joan Fitz-Randolph	19,719	24.72%
Libertarian	Scott Grainger	6,624	8.31%
Total votes		79,759	100.00%
Republican hold			
Republican hold			

=== District 22 ===
Primary Election Results
Party	Candidate	Votes	%
Democratic Party Primary Results
Democratic	Art Hamilton (incumbent)	3,049	62.43%
Democratic	John A. Loredo	1,835	37.57%
Total votes		4,884	100.00%
Republican Party Primary Results
Republican	John Atkins	771	55.67%
Republican	Caroline Coronado	614	44.33%
Total votes		1,385	100.00%

General Election Results
Party	Candidate	Votes	%
Democratic	Art Hamilton (incumbent)	10,367	39.11%
Democratic	John A. Loredo	7,853	29.63%
Republican	Caroline Coronado	4,402	16.61%
Republican	John Atkins	3,884	14.65%
Total votes		26,506	100.00%
Democratic hold			
Democratic hold			

=== District 23 ===
Primary Election Results
Party	Candidate	Votes	%
Democratic Party Primary Results
Democratic	Linda Aguirre (incumbent)	2,694	31.57%
Democratic	David Armstead (incumbent)	2,266	26.56%
Democratic	Leah Landrum	1,968	23.06%
Democratic	Carlos Avelar	1,605	18.81%
Total votes		8,533	100.00%

General Election Results
Party	Candidate	Votes	%
Democratic	Linda Aguirre (incumbent)	11,387	54.23%
Democratic	David Armstead (incumbent)	9,610	45.77%
Total votes		20,997	100.00%
Democratic hold			
Democratic hold			

=== District 24 ===
Primary Election Results
Party	Candidate	Votes	%
Republican Party Primary Results
Republican	Tom Horne	4,513	24.93%
Republican	Barbara Leff	4,072	22.50%
Republican	Lindy Funkhouser	3,966	21.91%
Republican	Kathryn Baillie	2,772	15.31%
Republican	Howard Sprague	1,829	10.10%
Republican	C. Rosenstock	563	3.11%
Republican	Angelo DeSimone	386	2.13%
Total votes		18,101	100.00%
Democratic Party Primary Results
Democratic	Lynne Sisson	2,034	54.46%
Democratic	Chris Alter	1,701	45.54%
Total votes		3,735	100.00%
Libertarian Party Primary Results
Libertarian	Jim Hamilton	39	52.70%
Libertarian	Gary Fallon (Note: Gary Fallon ran in the Libertarian Party primaries in both the state senator and state representative elections for district 24. In the general election, Gary Fallon only ran in the state senator race.)	35	47.30%
Total votes		74	100.00%

General Election Results
Party	Candidate	Votes	%
Republican	Tom Horne	27,847	31.29%
Republican	Barbara Leff	27,116	30.47%
Democratic	Lynne Sisson	16,174	18.17%
Democratic	Chris Alter	14,061	15.80%
Libertarian	Jim Hamilton	3,801	4.27%
Total votes		88,999	100.00%
Republican hold			
Republican hold			

=== District 25 ===
Primary Election Results
Party	Candidate	Votes	%
Democratic Party Primary Results
Democratic	Ken Cheuvront (incumbent)	4,019	45.52%
Democratic	Christine Weason	3,257	36.89%
Democratic	Margaret Updike	1,554	17.60%
Total votes		8,830	100.00%
Republican Party Primary Results
Republican	Robert Updike (incumbent)	4,278	59.67%
Republican	Henry Thome	2,891	40.33%
Total votes		7,169	100.00%
Libertarian Party Primary Results
Libertarian	Kent B. Van Cleave	57	100.00%
Total votes		57	100.00%

General Election Results
Party	Candidate	Votes	%
Democratic	Ken Cheuvront (incumbent)	18,777	29.48%
Democratic	Christine Weason	17,152	26.93%
Republican	Robert Updike (incumbent)	14,508	22.78%
Republican	Henry Thome	11,148	17.50%
Libertarian	Kent B. Van Cleave	2,114	3.32%
Total votes		63,699	100.00%
Democratic hold			
Democratic gain from Republican			

=== District 26 ===
Primary Election Results
Party	Candidate	Votes	%
Republican Party Primary Results
Republican	Robin Shaw (incumbent)	5,850	39.04%
Republican	Tom Smith (incumbent)	5,105	34.07%
Republican	John R. Mills	4,029	26.89%
Total votes		14,984	100.00%
Democratic Party Primary Results
Democratic	Karen Hofmeister	3,189	59.34%
Democratic	Billy Wrye	2,185	40.66%
Total votes		5,374	100.00%

General Election Results
Party	Candidate	Votes	%
Republican	Robin Shaw (incumbent)	28,985	32.03%
Republican	Tom Smith (incumbent)	27,166	30.02%
Democratic	Karen Hofmeister	19,461	21.51%
Democratic	Billy Wrye	14,881	16.44%
Total votes		90,493	100.00%
Republican hold			
Republican hold			

=== District 27 ===
Primary Election Results
Party	Candidate	Votes	%
Republican Party Primary Results
Republican	Laura Knaperek (incumbent)	6,387	40.22%
Republican	Mike Gardner (incumbent)	6,304	39.70%
Republican	Glenna Twing	3,190	20.09%
Total votes		15,881	100.00%
Democratic Party Primary Results
Democratic	Tom Head	4,462	100.00%
Total votes		4,462	100.00%

General Election Results
Party	Candidate	Votes	%
Republican	Laura Knaperek (incumbent)	26,852	35.87%
Republican	Mike Gardner (incumbent)	24,039	32.11%
Democratic	Tom Head	19,897	26.58%
Natural Law	Elizabeth C. Lessard	4,072	5.44%
Total votes		74,860	100.00%
Republican hold			
Republican hold			

=== District 28 ===
Primary Election Results
Party	Candidate	Votes	%
Republican Party Primary Results
Republican	Carolyn S. Allen (incumbent)	10,155	54.65%
Republican	Wes Marsh (incumbent)	8,427	45.35%
Total votes		18,582	100.00%

General Election Results
Party	Candidate	Votes	%
Republican	Carolyn S. Allen (incumbent)	53,739	55.40%
Republican	Wes Marsh (incumbent)	43,257	44.60%
Total votes		96,996	100.00%
Republican hold			
Republican hold			

=== District 29 ===
Primary Election Results
Party	Candidate	Votes	%
Republican Party Primary Results
Republican	Mark Anderson (incumbent)	4,642	39.87%
Republican	Paul Mortensen (incumbent)	4,525	38.86%
Republican	Mary Lou Boettcher	2,477	21.27%
Total votes		11,644	100.00%

General Election Results
Party	Candidate	Votes	%
Republican	Mark Anderson (incumbent)	21,598	53.71%
Republican	Paul Mortensen (incumbent)	18,612	46.29%
Total votes		40,210	100.00%
Republican hold			
Republican hold			

=== District 30 ===
Primary Election Results
Party	Candidate	Votes	%
Republican Party Primary Results
Republican	Karen S. Johnson	6,439	31.54%
Republican	Jeff Groscost (incumbent)	5,174	25.34%
Republican	Myrna Sheppard	4,652	22.78%
Republican	John Fillmore	3,206	15.70%
Republican	Vic Largesse	946	4.63%
Total votes		20,417	100.00%
Democratic Party Primary Results
Democratic	Eileen Fellner	2,364	100.00%
Total votes		2,364	100.00%

General Election Results
Party	Candidate	Votes	%
Republican	Karen S. Johnson	35,817	40.59%
Republican	Jeff Groscost (incumbent)	28,636	32.45%
Democratic	Eileen Fellner	23,780	26.95%
Total votes		88,233	100.00%
Republican hold			
Republican hold			

== See also ==
- 1996 United States elections
- 1996 United States presidential election in Arizona
- 1996 United States House of Representatives elections in Arizona
- 1996 Arizona Senate election
- 43rd Arizona State Legislature
- Arizona House of Representatives
