= 44th Arizona State Legislature =

Session of the Arizona Legislature

←	43rd	45th	→
- Arizona State Capitol (2014)

Overview
- Legislative body: Arizona State Legislature
- Jurisdiction: Arizona, United States
- Term: January 1, 1999 – December 31, 2000

Senate
- Members: 30
- President: Brenda Burns*
- Temporary President: John Wettaw*
- Party control: Republican (16–14)

House of Representatives
- Members: 60
- Speaker: Jeff Groscost*
- Party control: Republican (40–20)

Sessions
- 1st: January 11 – May 7, 1999
- 2nd: January 10 – April 18, 2000

Special sessions
- 1st: March 31 – April 7, 1999
- 2nd: June 22 – June 22, 1999
- 3rd: December 13 – December 14, 1999
- 4th: February 14 – February 17, 2000
- 5th: June 6 – June 28, 2000
- 6th: October 20 – October 20, 2000
- 7th: November 13 – December 4, 2000

The 44th Arizona State Legislature, consisting of the Arizona State Senate and the Arizona House of Representatives, was constituted in Phoenix from January 1, 1999, to December 31, 2000, during the first two years of Jane Dee Hull's first full term in office. Both the Senate and the House membership remained constant at 30 and 60, respectively. The Republicans lost two seats in the Senate, but still held a 16–14 majority. The Republicans gained two seats in the House, maintaining their majority in the lower chamber, 40–20.

== Sessions ==
The Legislature met for two regular sessions at the State Capitol in Phoenix. The first opened on January 11, 1999, and adjourned on May 7, while the Second Regular Session convened on January 10, 2000, and adjourned sine die on April 18.

There were seven Special Sessions, the first of which was convened on March 31, 1999, and adjourned on April 7; the second convened on June 22, 1999, and adjourned sine die on the same day; the third convened on December 13, 1999, and adjourned sine die December 14; the fourth convened on February 14, 2000, and adjourned sine die on February 17; the fifth convened on June 6, 2000, and adjourned sine die June 28; the sixth special session convened and adjourned on October 20, 2000; and the final special session, the seventh, convened on November 13, 2000, and adjourned sine die on December 4.

== State Senate ==
=== Members ===
The asterisk (*) denotes members of the previous Legislature who continued in office as members of this Legislature.

District	Senator	Party	Notes
1	Ken Bennett	Republican	
2	John Wettaw*	Republican	
3	Jack C. Jackson	Democrat	
4	Jack A. Brown*	Democrat	
5	Herb Guenther	Democrat	
6	John Huppenthal*	Republican	
7	Pete Rios*	Democrat	
8	Gus Arzberger*	Democrat	
9	Keith A. Bee*	Republican	
10	Victor E. Soltero*	Democrat	
11	Elaine Richardson	Democrat	
12	Ann Day*	Republican	
13	George Cunningham*	Democrat	
14	Ruth Solomon*	Democrat	
15	Edward Cirillo*	Republican	
16	Darden C. Hamilton	Republican	
17	Brenda Burns*	Republican	
18	Marc Spitzer*	Republican	
19	Scott Bundgaard*	Republican	
20	Mary Hartley*	Democrat	
21	Russell Bowers*	Republican	
22	Joe Eddie Lopez*	Democrat	
23	Linda Aguirre	Democrat	
24	Sue Grace*	Republican	
25	Chris Cummiskey*	Democrat	
26	Tom Smith	Republican	
27	Harry E. Mitchell	Democrat	
28	Randall Gnant*	Republican	
29	David Peterson*	Republican	
30	Tom Freestone*	Republican	

== House of Representatives ==
=== Members ===
The asterisk (*) denotes members of the previous Legislature who continued in office as members of this Legislature.

District	Representative	Party	Notes
1	Linda Binder	Republican	
1	Barbara Blewster	Republican	
2	Joe Hart*	Republican	
2	John Verkamp*	Republican	
3	Tom Gordon	Republican	
3	Sylvia Laughter	Democrat	
4	Debra Brimhall*	Republican	
4	Jake Flake*	Republican	
5	Jim Carruthers*	Republican	
5	Robert McLendon*	Democrat	
6	Lori Daniels*	Republican	
6	Richard Kyle*	Republican	
7	Harry R. Clark*	Democrat	
7	Rebecca Rios*	Democrat	
8	Gail Griffin*	Republican	
8	Mark Maiorana	Democrat	
9	W. A. McGibbon*	Republican	
9	Lou-Ann Preble*	Republican	
10	Sally Ann Gonzales*	Democrat	
10	Ramon Valedez*	Democrat	
11	Carmine Cardamone*	Democrat	
11	Debora Norris*	Democrat	
12	Steve Huffman	Republican	
12	Dan Schottel*	Republican	
13	Kathleen Dunbar	Republican	
13	Andy Nichols*	Democrat	
14	Herschella Horton*	Democrat	
14	Mary Pickens*	Democrat	
15	Mike Gleason*	Republican	
15	Jerry Overton*	Republican	
16	Linda Gray*	Republican	
16	James Weiers*	Republican	
17	Robert Burns*	Republican	
17	Jean McGrath*	Republican	
18	Susan Muir Gerard*	Republican	
18	Barry Wong*	Republican	
19	Ted Carpenter	Republican	
19	Roberta Voss*	Republican	
20	Bill Brotherton	Democrat	
20	Kathi Foster*	Democrat	
21	Dean Cooley*	Republican	
21	Marilyn Jarrett*	Republican	
22	John Loredo*	Democrat	
22	Richard Miranda	Democrat	
23	Carlos Avelar	Democrat	
23	Leah Landrum Taylor	Democrat	
24	Tom Horne*	Republican	
24	Barbara Leff*	Republican	
25	Ken Cheuvront*	Democrat	
25	Christine Weason*	Democrat	
26	Jeff Hatch-Miller	Republican	
26	Steve May	Republican	
27	Michael Gardner*	Republican	
27	Laura Knaperek*	Republican	
28	Carolyn Allen*	Republican	
28	Wesley Marsh*	Republican	
29	Mark Anderson*	Republican	
29	Wayne L. Gardner	Republican	
30	Jeff Groscost*	Republican	
30	Karen S. Johnson*	Republican	
