= 43rd Arizona State Legislature =

Session of the Arizona Legislature

←	42nd	44th	→
- Arizona State Capitol (2014)

Overview
- Legislative body: Arizona State Legislature
- Jurisdiction: Arizona, United States
- Term: January 1, 1997 – December 31, 1998

Senate
- Members: 30
- President: Brenda Burns
- Temporary President: John Wettaw*
- Party control: Republican (18–12)

House of Representatives
- Members: 60
- Speaker: Don Aldridge (resigned October 1997); Jeff Groscost (elected November 1997)
- Party control: Republican (38–22)

Sessions
- 1st: January 13 – April 21, 1997
- 2nd: January 12 – May 22, 1998

Special sessions
- 1st: March 24 – March 27, 1997
- 2nd: November 12 – November 14, 1997
- 3rd: March 11 – April 8, 1998
- 4th: May 6 – May 14, 1998
- 5th: July 7 – July 8, 1998
- 6th: December 16 – December 16, 1998

The 43rd Arizona State Legislature, consisting of the Arizona State Senate and the Arizona House of Representatives, was constituted in Phoenix from January 1, 1997, to December 31, 1998, during the final year of Fife Symington's second and last term as governor, and during the remainder of his term when Jane Dee Hull was appointed governor after Symington's resignation. Both the Senate and the House membership remained constant at 30 and 60, respectively. The Republicans lost a seat in the Senate, but still held a 18–12 majority. The Republicans maintained their majority in the lower chamber, remaining at 38–22.

== Sessions ==
The Legislature met for two regular sessions at the State Capitol in Phoenix. The first opened on January 13, 1997, and adjourned on April 21, while the Second Regular Session convened on January 12, 1998, and adjourned sine die on May 22.

There were six Special Sessions, the first of which was convened on March 24, 1997, and adjourned on March 27; the second convened on November 12, 1997, and adjourned sine die on November 14; the third convened on March 11, 1998, and adjourned sine die April 8; the fourth convened on May 6, 1998, and adjourned sine die on May 14; the fifth convened on July 7, 1998, and adjourned sine die July 8; the sixth and final special session convened and adjourned on December 16, 1998.

== State Senate ==
=== Members ===
The asterisk (*) denotes members of the previous Legislature who continued in office as members of this Legislature.

District	Senator	Party	Notes
1	Carol Springer*	Republican	
2	John Wettaw*	Republican	
3	James Henderson Jr.*	Democrat	
4	Jack A. Brown	Democrat	
5	Pat Conner	Republican	
6	John Huppenthal*	Republican	
7	Pete Rios	Democrat	
8	Gus Arzberger*	Democrat	
9	Keith A. Bee*	Republican	
10	Victor E. Soltero*	Democrat	
11	Elaine Richardson	Democrat	
12	Ann Day*	Republican	
13	George Cunningham*	Democrat	
14	Ruth Solomon*	Democrat	
15	Edward Cirillo	Republican	
16	John Kaites*	Republican	
17	Brenda Burns*	Republican	
18	Marc Spitzer*	Republican	
19	Scott Bundgaard	Republican	
20	Mary Hartley*	Democrat	
21	Russell Bowers	Republican	
22	Joe Eddie Lopez	Democrat	
23	Sandra Kennedy*	Democrat	
24	Sue Grace	Republican	
25	Chris Cummiskey*	Democrat	
26	Tom Patterson*	Republican	
27	Gary Richardson*	Republican	
28	Randall Gnant*	Republican	
29	David Peterson*	Republican	
30	Tom Freestone	Republican	

== House of Representatives ==
=== Members ===
The asterisk (*) denotes members of the previous Legislature who continued in office as members of this Legislature.

District	Representative	Party	Notes
1	Donald R. Aldridge*	Republican	
1	Sue Lynch*	Republican	
2	Joe Hart*	Republican	
2	John Verkamp*	Republican	
3	Benjamin Hanley*	Democrat	
3	Jack C. Jackson*	Democrat	
4	Debra Brimhall	Republican	
4	Jake Flake	Republican	
5	Jim Carruthers	Republican	
5	Robert McLendon*	Democrat	
6	Lori Daniels*	Republican	
6	Richard Kyle	Republican	
7	Harry R. Clark*	Democrat	
7	Rebecca Rios*	Democrat	
8	Gail Griffin	Republican	
8	Paul Newman*	Democrat	
9	W. A. McGibbon*	Republican	
9	Lou-Ann Preble*	Republican	
10	Sally Ann Gonzales	Democrat	
10	Ramon Valedez	Democrat	
11	Carmine Cardamone	Democrat	
11	Debora Norris	Democrat	
12	Winifred Hershberger*	Republican	
12	Dan Schottel*	Republican	
13	Brian Fagin	Democrat	
13	Andy Nichols*	Democrat	
14	Herschella Horton*	Democrat	
14	Mary Pickens*	Democrat	
15	Mike Gleason	Republican	
15	Jerry Overton*	Republican	
16	Linda Gray	Republican	
16	James Weiers*	Republican	
17	Robert Burns*	Republican	
17	Jean McGrath*	Republican	
18	Susan Muir Gerard*	Republican	
18	Barry Wong*	Republican	
19	David Eberhart*	Republican	
19	Roberta Voss	Republican	
20	Kathi Foster*	Democrat	
20	Rebecca Rios	Democrat	
21	Dean Cooley	Republican	
21	Marilyn Jarrett	Republican	
22	Art Hamilton*	Democrat	
22	John Loredo	Democrat	
23	Linda Aguirre*	Democrat	
23	David Armstead*	Democrat	
24	Tom Horne	Republican	
24	Barbara Leff	Republican	
25	Ken Cheuvront	Democrat	
25	Christine Weason	Democrat	
26	Robin Shaw*	Republican	
26	Tom Smith*	Republican	
27	Michael Gardner*	Republican	
27	Laura Knaperek*	Republican	
28	Carolyn Allen*	Republican	
28	Wesley Marsh*	Republican	
29	Mark Anderson*	Republican	
29	Lela Steffey	Republican	
30	Jeff Groscost*	Republican	
30	Karen S. Johnson	Republican	
