= Dave Farnsworth =

American politician

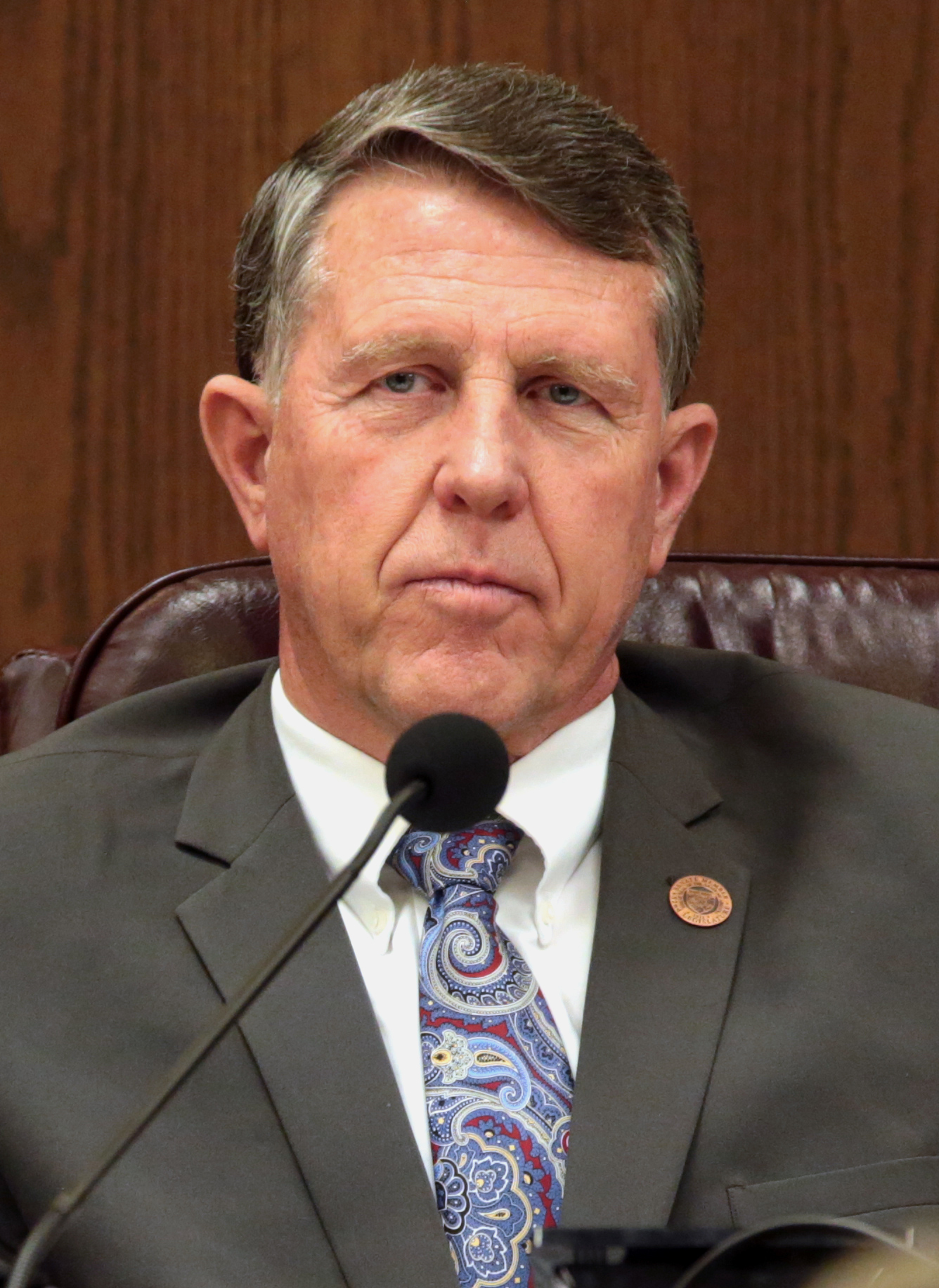
- Farnsworth in 2017

Member of the Arizona Senate from the 10th district
- Incumbent
- Assumed office January 9, 2023
- Preceded by: Stephanie Stahl Hamilton

Member of the Arizona Senate from the 16th district
- In office September 11, 2013 – January 11, 2021
- Preceded by: Rich Crandall
- Succeeded by: Kelly Townsend

Member of the Arizona House of Representatives from the 4th district
- In office January 1995 – January 1997 Serving with Jack Brown
- Preceded by: Polly Rosenbaum
- Succeeded by: Debra Brimhall; Jake Flake

Personal details
- Born: David Christian Farnsworth; July 16, 1951 (age 75) Mexico City, Mexico
- Party: Republican
- Education: Mesa Community College

David Christian Farnsworth (born July 16, 1951) is an American politician and a Republican member of the Arizona Senate representing District 10 since 2023. He was previously appointed to the Arizona Senate on September 11, 2013, to fill the vacancy caused by the resignation of Rich Crandall. Farnsworth served non-consecutively in the Arizona State Legislature from January 1995 until January 1997 in the Arizona House of Representatives District 4 seat.

== Education ==
Farnsworth graduated from Mesa High School and earned his AA from Mesa Community College.

== Elections ==
- 1994: To challenge House District 4 incumbent Democratic Representative Jack Brown and Polly Rosenbaum, Farnsworth ran in the September 13, 1994, Republican Primary as a write-in candidate, qualifying with 582 votes. In the November 8, 1994, general election, Farnsworth took the first seat with 20,780 votes, Representative Brown took the second seat, and Representative Rosenbaum placed third, concluding a 45-year career in the Arizona House, having served from 1949 until 1995.
- 1996: When Democratic Senator Bill Hardt left the Legislature and left the Senate District 4 seat open, Farnsworth was unopposed for the September 10, 1996, Republican Primary, winning with 7,388 votes; but lost the November 5, 1996, general election to Democratic Representative Jack Brown.
- 1998: To challenge incumbent Democratic Senator Jack Brown, Farnsworth was unopposed for the September 8, 1998, Republican Primary, winning with 6,713 votes; but lost the November 3, 1998, general election to incumbent Democratic Senator Brown.
- 2022: Farnsworth ousted Russell Bowers in the Republican primary as candidate for the Arizona Senate.
