= John A. Buttrick =

American judge and politician

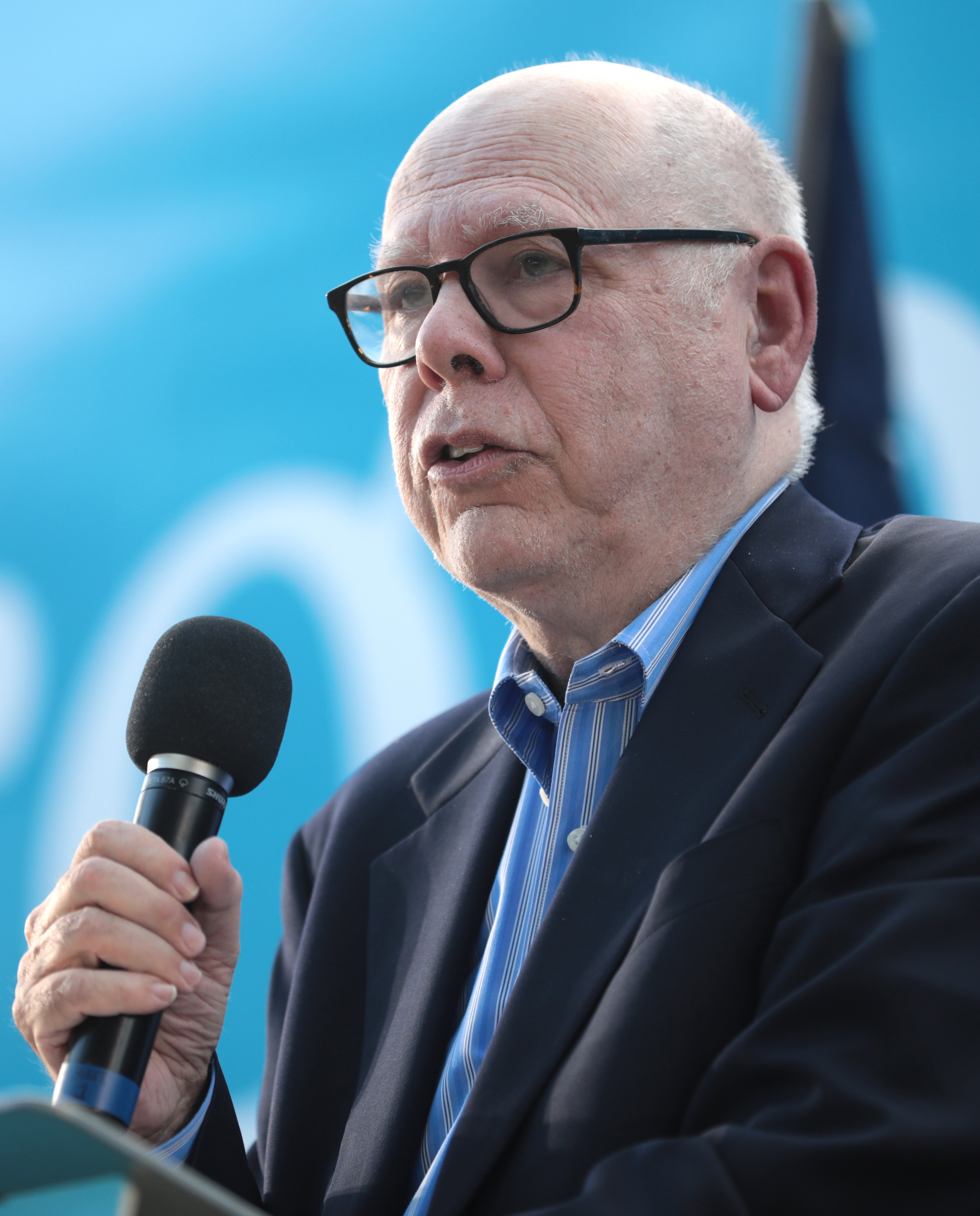

Chair of the Libertarian Party of Arizona
- In office July 2017 – 2018
- Preceded by: Michael Kielsky
- Succeeded by: Howard Blitz

Magistrate Judge of the United States District Court for the District of Arizona
- In office August 17, 2012 – August 16, 2016

Personal details
- Party: Libertarian
- Education: Harvard Law School
- Profession: Attorney, Judge

John A. Buttrick is an American attorney, judge, and former chairman of the Libertarian Party of Arizona.

Buttrick served as a part-time United States magistrate judge for the United States District Court for the District of Arizona from August 17, 2012 until August 16, 2016.

== Education and career ==
Buttrick received his J.D. from Harvard Law School in 1976 and a bachelor's degree in philosophy from the University of Denver in 1973. Before his appointment to the bench, Buttrick was a partner at the law firm Brown and Bain (now Perkins Coie). In 2001, Governor Jane Dee Hull appointed Buttrick to the Maricopa Superior Court. He served in this position until he accepted an appointment as a federal magistrate in 2012.

In the 1990s Buttrick served on the Libertarian National Committee and as Chair of the National Platform Committee.

== Elections ==
- Retained as a superior court judge in 2004 and 2008.
- Libertarian candidate for the Arizona House of Representatives in 1998
- Libertarian nominee for Governor of Arizona in 1994, receiving 3.1% of the vote.
