= Arizona Libertarian Party =

State affiliate of the Libertarian Party

- Abbreviation: AZLP
- Chairperson: Dru Heaton
- Founded: October 7, 1972; 54 years ago
- Membership (2021): 37,948
- Ideology: Libertarianism
- Senate: 0 / 30
- House of Representatives: 0 / 60
- U.S. Senate: 0 / 2
- U.S. House of Representatives: 0 / 9
- Other elected officials: 1 (June 2024)

Website
- www.azlp.org

The Arizona Libertarian Party (AZLP) is the Arizona affiliate of the national Libertarian Party (LP) and has been active since its foundation on October 7, 1972.

The Arizona Libertarian Party conducted its first ballot access drive in 1975 to gain ballot access for the 1976 elections. The party received support from former representative Sam Steiger who attended their state conventions and served as their gubernatorial nominee in 1982. However, following Steiger's gubernatorial campaign the party was unsuccessful in ballot access until the 1994 gubernatorial election. During the 1990s there was a leadership dispute within the party that led to the party giving its presidential ballot access to L. Neil Smith instead of Harry Browne.

== History ==
=== 1970s ===
On October 7, 1972, the organization meeting of the Arizona Libertarian Party was held at Arizona State University in Tempe, Arizona. In 1972, the party had 35 dues paying members and held a state convention to plan on how to seek legal recognition as a party. In 1973, the party was organized and elected its party officials and by 1974, had grown to over 200 members.

In January 1975, the party announced that it would begin its first ballot access drive to collect the 11,044 signatures needed to gain ballot access for the 1976 elections and by June had submitted petitions with 9,913 signatures with plans to submit the remaining signatures later. However, the deadline for the signatures passed while state officials were counting the signatures, but the Libertarian Party was successful in gaining a court ordered extension to the deadline and were given ballot access after the counting of the signatures concluded on July 21.

The party's 1978 state convention was attended by Washington Post columnist Nicholas von Hoffman and former Republican representative Sam Steiger who addressed them on political fundraising. Under Arizona law at the time in order for a party to maintain political party recognition it would need to receive 5% of the total votes cast in an election and under that rule the party lost its recognition as it only received 1.4% of the total votes. The party filed a lawsuit against Arizona's ballot access laws to maintain party recognition, but officially lost its recognition on March 1, 1978, when the Arizona Supreme Court ruled 3–2 that Arizona's ballot access law was constitutional.

=== 1980s ===
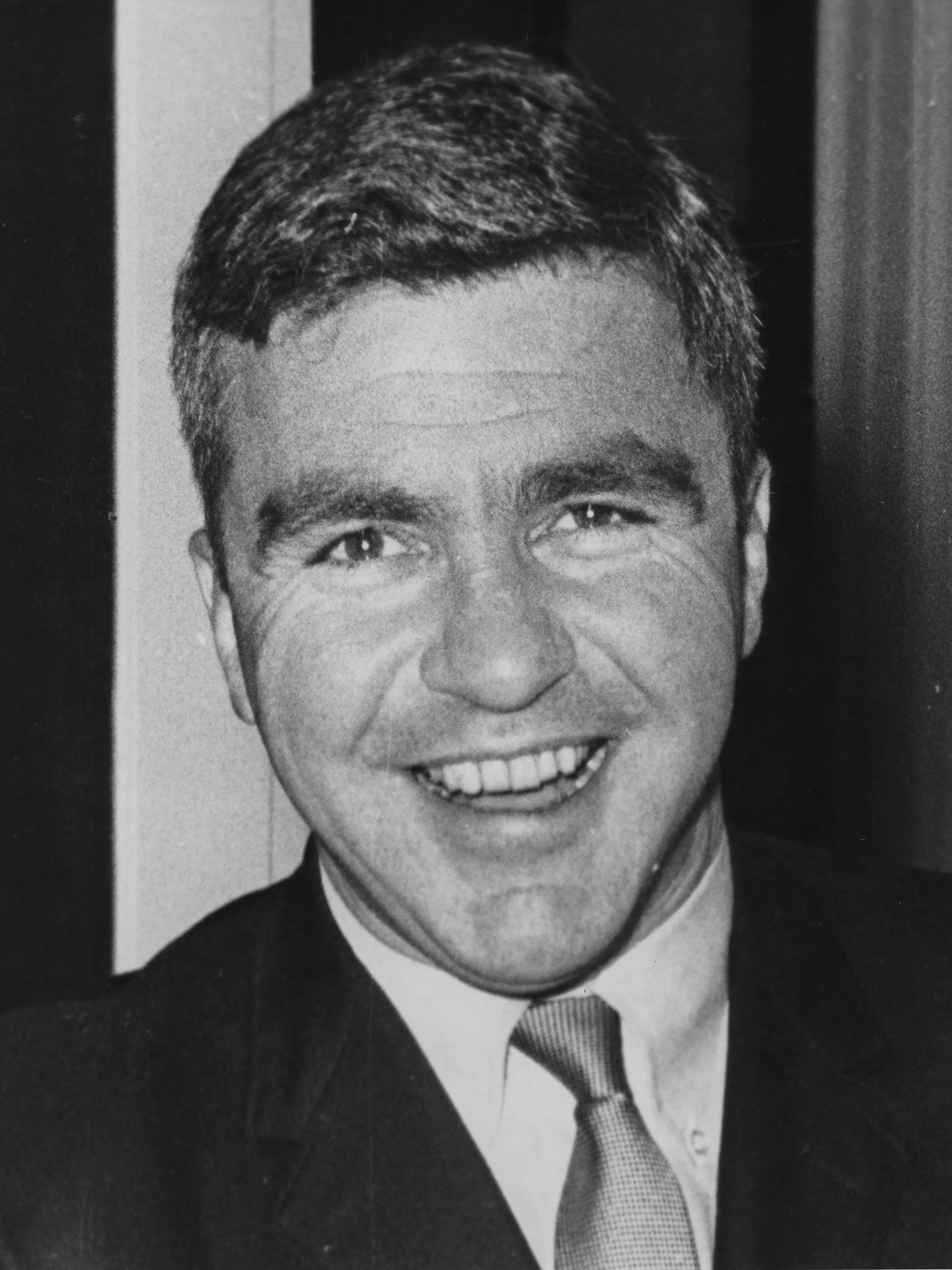
Former Representative Sam Steiger served as the party's gubernatorial candidate in 1982

The national party's presidential candidate, Ed Clark, attended the party's 1979 and 1980 state conventions and offered support to their attempts to regain ballot access and to place a ballot measure to eliminate taxes placed on food or food products and to repeal Arizona's auto-emissions tests. Although the party was unsuccessful in placing their auto-emissions test repeal measures onto the ballot their food sales tax repeal was successful and removed the state's 4% sales tax on food products and were successful in regaining ballot access and placing Ed Clark onto the Arizona 1980 presidential ballot.

At their 1982 state convention Ed Clark addressed them for the third time; he announced that he would not seek the party's 1984 presidential nomination as to prevent it from becoming a cult of personality. The party had been struggling in their attempts to maintain ballot access with the difficulty of obtaining enough signatures to gain ballot access and gaining the 5% needed in a gubernatorial or presidential race to maintain it, but shortly before their state convention Sam Steiger, who had attended one of their previous conventions and had been sympathetic to the party since his failed 1976 Senate campaign, announced that he would run for governor as a Libertarian to help the party reach the 5% goal although he admitted that he had no chance of winning. In the 1982 gubernatorial election Steiger received more than the 5% vote after spending $6,000. This gave the party automatic ballot access for the 1984 elections.

Despite the fact that the party qualified for automatic ballot access at the state level, due to a technicality, the party was not qualified for automatic ballot access at the county level in Pima County as Stieger only received 4% of the vote there and an opinion by Attorney General Robert K. Corbin only gave them ballot access for Maricopa and Coconino counties. They attempted to appeal to the courts to have the law overturned, but were ruled against by the attorney general. The party hosted the 1985 National Convention for the national Libertarian Party in Phoenix.

In 1986, Ken Sturzenacker, the chairman of the party, resigned after the executive committee ousted him from his post after he was accused of spending money without authorization and for failing to collect enough signatures to gain ballot access for the 1986 elections. The party failed for the first time since 1974 to collect enough signatures to appear on the ballot after collecting less than the 20,000 signatures required. Due to their lack of ballot access the party was unable to field a gubernatorial candidate so for the 1986 gubernatorial election the party endorsed Evan Mecham in the race which he won.

=== 1990s ===
In 1993, Tucson officials refused to give ballot access to a Libertarian attempting to run for city council as according to their signature requirement he would need 5% of the total number of votes for the previous Libertarian candidate regardless of what party they were registered to while the Arizona affiliate stated that it would only be 5% of all registered Libertarians in the city. The party appealed the decision to a superior court which ruled in their favor allowing their city council candidate to run.

In 1994, John Buttrick became the first Libertarian gubernatorial candidate to appear on the ballot in twelve years since Sam Stieger in 1982, after a successful ballot access drive by the party. Buttrick failed to meet the 5% requirement to get automatic ballot access, but the party was successful in other areas where they took 7% in the Senate race which was the best performance for a Libertarian nationally at the time, maintained ballot access in Pima County, and increased voter registration to almost 8,000 which brought them closer to the 14,000 that would give them automatic ballot access.

The Pima County Libertarian Party was disaffiliated with the Arizona party in 1996. This was after a legal dispute in 1995 over whether the Pima County or Maricopa County affiliate represented the statewide party, was due to them carrying out party elections against the orders of the state party which started a three-year legal dispute. The party missed the deadline for it to submit its eight presidential electors putting Harry Browne's presidential ballot access in Arizona at risk, but after a court appeal they were given access by a superior court. The party also saw its registered voter amount rise above the amount needed to become a recognized party in Arizona and would not have to submit petitions to gain ballot access.

In 1999, after a court ordered the Pima and Maricopa County affiliates to meet and elect officers in accordance with state law, which was ignored by the Maricopa affiliate causing a contempt of court motion, a new state chairman was elected and the Pima County Libertarian Party was re-affiliated with the state party.

=== 2000s ===
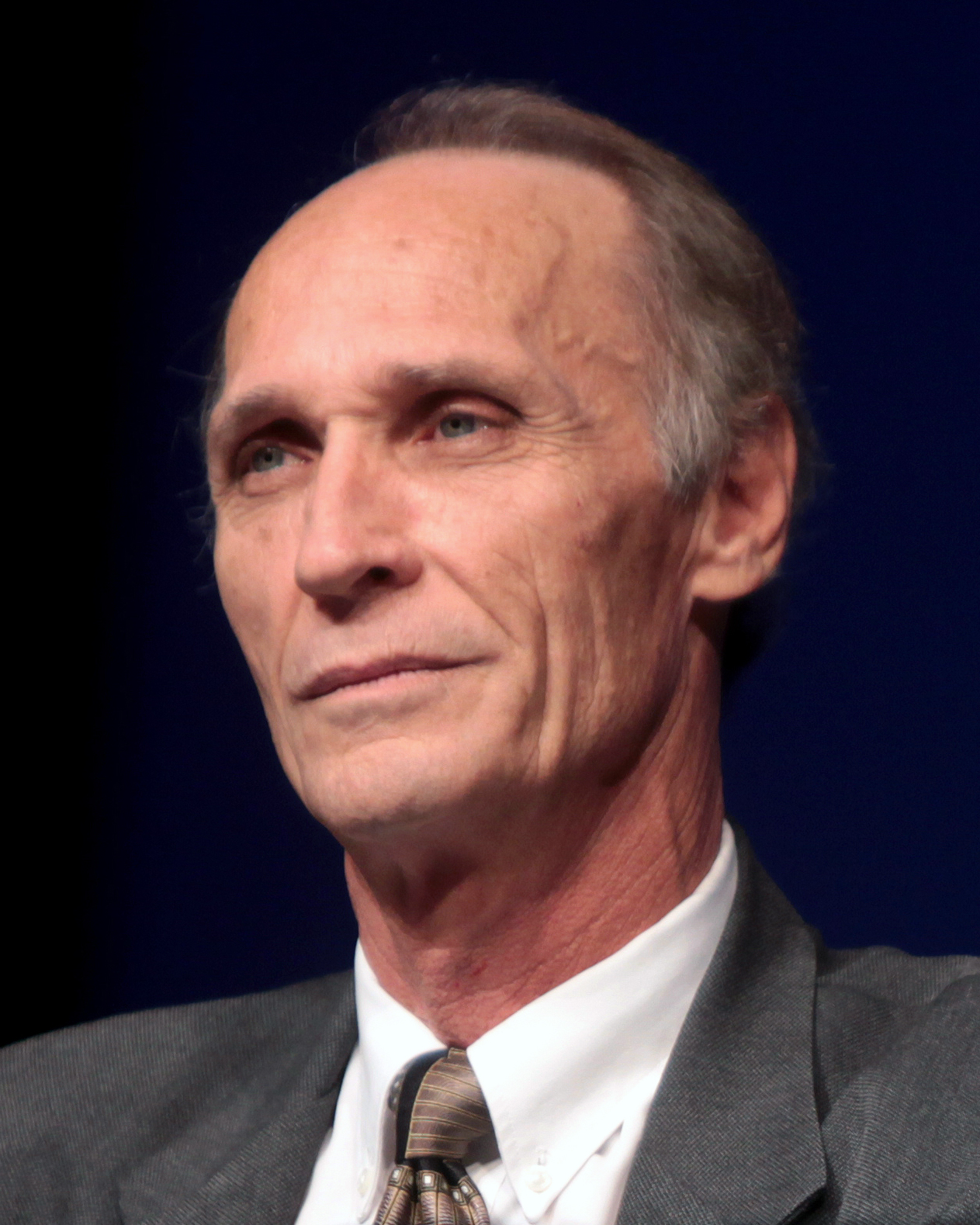
Barry Hess received over 5% of the popular vote in the 2000 United States Senate election.

Another legal dispute arose during the 2000 presidential campaign when two different groups claimed to be the official Libertarian Party of Arizona. In early 2000, a superior court ruled that the group not recognized by the national Libertarian Party, the splinter group based in Tempe, was the official state party and gave it access to the voter list rather than the Tucson-based group recognized by the national party. Arizona continued its recognition of the Tempe faction when it gave the Libertarian presidential ballot access to author L. Neil Smith, who failed to win the national party's nomination. It was upheld after a lawsuit filed by the national party and Harry Browne who would be forced to file as independents, but due to the short time frame were unable to appear on the ballot.

In 2001, the Tempe group along with the Democratic and Republican parties of Arizona attempted to challenge election laws that dealt with the election of party officials, but were ruled against in appellate court. The Tempe Libertarians later filed a lawsuit to bar independents from voting in political party primaries and end Arizona's open primaries and won in federal district court, but the ruling was overturned in appeals court. The Tucson group at the same time lost its lawsuit to strike down Arizona's short filing period for independents that it filed during the 2000 presidential election.

During the 2004 presidential election the party filed a lawsuit stating that Arizona State University and the Commission on Presidential Debates were illegally using tax dollars to conduct a debate that excluded other presidential candidates. During the 2008 presidential election the Libertarian Party declined a government-financed presidential primary and instead held its own private primary online. Less than seventy voters participated in the private primary that was won by George Phillies.

=== 2010s ===
In 2011, the Arizona Green and Libertarian parties filed a lawsuit due to the new voter registration card only including the two largest parties while all other parties would have to be written in, but the courts ruled in favor of Arizona. They attempted to have the U.S. District Court reconsider its decision and to bring the case to the Supreme Court, but both attempts failed.

The party struggled to field candidates in 2016 due to a dramatic increase in signature requirements by state Republicans to limit Libertarians on the ballot. However, Libertarian justice of the peace candidate Gregory Kelly was able to overcome the new signature requirements to get on the ballot. He received 25,356 votes (31.56%) in the Highland District race.

=== 2020s ===
In 2022, the Libertarian party nominated Marc Victor (who had been their nominee in 2012 against Jeff Flake) in the 2022 United States Senate election in Arizona. Before the election took place, but after the names on the ballots had been finalized, Victor dropped out and endorsed Republican candidate Blake Masters. Marc Victor received 53,762 votes - 2.09% of the final total.

== Elected officials ==
- Nathan Madden – School Board Member Buckeye Union High School District (2023–Present)

== Electoral performance ==
=== Presidential ===
Electoral performance

President
Election year	Vote percentage	+/–	Votes	Presidential candidate	Vice presidential candidate	Result	Reference
1976	1.03 / 100	Steady	7,647	Roger MacBride	David Bergland	Lost	
1980	2.15 / 100	▲1.12	18,784	Ed Clark	David Koch	Lost	
1984	1.03 / 100	▼1.12	10,585	David Bergland	James A. Lewis	Lost	
1988	1.14 / 100	▲0.11	13,351	Ron Paul	Andre Marrou	Lost	
1992	0.45 / 100	▼0.69	6,759	Andre Marrou	Nancy Lord	Lost	
1996	1.02 / 100	▲0.57	14,358	Harry Browne	Jo Jorgensen	Lost	
2000	0.38 / 100	▼0.64	5,775	L. Neil Smith (Note: Harry Browne was the national candidate, but due to a dispute between the Arizona affiliate and the national party L. Neil Smith was on the ballot instead.)	Vin Suprynowicz (Note: Art Olivier was the national candidate, but due to a dispute between the Arizona affiliate and the national party Vin Suprynowicz was on the ballot instead.)	Lost	
2004	0.59 / 100	▲0.21	11,856	Michael Badnarik	Richard Campagna	Lost	
2008	0.54 / 100	▼0.05	12,555	Bob Barr	Wayne Allyn Root	Lost	
2012	1.39 / 100	▲0.85	32,100	Gary Johnson	Jim Gray	Lost	
2016	4.16 / 100	▲2.77	106,327	Gary Johnson	Bill Weld	Lost	
2020	1.52 / 100	▼2.56	51,465	Jo Jorgensen	Spike Cohen	Lost	
2024	0.50 / 100	▼1.02	17,898	Chase Oliver	Mike ter Maat	Lost	

=== Gubernatorial ===
Electoral performance

Governor
Election year	Vote percentage	+/–	Votes	Gubernatorial candidate	Result	Reference
1978	1.93 / 100	Steady	10,421	V. Gene Lewter	Lost	
1982	5.05 / 100	▲3.12	36,649	Sam Steiger	Lost	
1986	39.67 / 100	Steady	343,913	Evan Mecham (Note: Endorsed)	Won	
1990	0.03 / 100	▲0.03	316	Ed Yetman (write-in)	Lost	
1994	3.12 / 100	▲3.09	35,222	John A. Buttrick	Lost	
1998	2.67 / 100	▼0.45	27,150	Katherine Gallant	Lost	
2002	1.66 / 100	▼1.01	20,356	Barry Hess	Lost	
2006	1.97 / 100	▲0.31	30,268	Barry Hess	Lost	
2010	2.24 / 100	▲0.27	38,722	Barry Hess	Lost	
2014	3.81 / 100	▲1.57	57,337	Barry Hess	Lost	
2018	0.00 / 100	▼3.81	0	None	Lost	

=== Senate Class I ===
Senate results

Senator Class I
Election year	Vote percentage	+/–	Votes	Senatorial candidate	Result	Reference
1976	0.99 / 100	Steady	7,310	Allan Norwitz	Lost	
1982	2.78 / 100	▲1.79%	20,100	Randall Clamons	Lost	
1988	1.79 / 100	▼0.99%	20,849	Rick Tompkins	Lost	
1994	6.75 / 100	▲4.96%	75,493	Scott Grainger	Lost	
2000	5.06 / 100	▼1.68%	70,724	Barry Hess	Lost	
2006	3.16 / 100	▼1.90%	48,231	Richard Mack	Lost	
2012	4.55 / 100	▲1.39%	102,109	Marc J. Victor	Lost	
2018	0.00 / 100	▼4.55	0	None	Lost	

=== Senate Class III ===
Senate results

Senator Class II
Election year	Vote percentage	+/–	Votes	Senatorial candidate	Result	Reference
1980	1.37 / 100	Steady	12,008	Fred R. Esser	Lost	
1986	0.00 / 100	▼1.37%	0	None	Lost	
1992	1.64 / 100	▲1.64%	22,613	Kiana Delamare	Lost	
1998	2.27 / 100	▲0.63%	23,004	John C. Zajac	Lost	
2004	2.64 / 100	▲0.37%	51,798	Ernest Hancock	Lost	
2010	4.71 / 100	▲2.07%	80,097	David Nolan	Lost	
2016	0.00 / 100	▼4.71	0	None	Lost	

== Voter registration ==
Voter registration

Year	RV.	%	Change
1980	2,839	(0.25%)	Steady
1982	3,721	(0.30%)	▲0.05%
1988	4,937	(0.27%)	▼0.03%
1990	4,632	(0.25%)	▼0.02%
1992	5,299	(0.27%)	▲0.02%
1994	7,574	(0.37%)	▲0.10%
1996	18,418	(0.82%)	▲0.45%
1998	17,466	(0.77%)	▼0.05%
1999	15,265	(0.73%)	▼0.04%
2000	12,576	(0.58%)	▼0.15%
2001	14,976	(0.69%)	▲0.11%
2002	14,259	(0.64%)	▼0.05%
2003	15,628	(0.70%)	▲0.06%
2004	18,261	(0.69%)	▼0.01%
2005	18,241	(0.68%)	▼0.01%
2006	17,446	(0.68%)	Steady
2007	18,631	(0.69%)	▲0.01%
2008	18,153	(0.61%)	▼0.08%
2009	24,842	(0.80%)	▲0.19%
2010	24,382	(0.77%)	▼0.03%
2011	23,392	(0.74%)	▼0.03%
2012	22,086	(0.71%)	▼0.03%
2013	25,845	(0.80%)	▲0.09%
2014	26,589	(0.82%)	▲0.02%
2015	27,099	(0.82%)	Steady
2016	31,358	(0.87%)	▲0.05%
2017	31,941	(0.87%)	Steady
2018	31,583	(0.85%)	▼0.02%
2019	32,258	(0.84%)	▼0.01%

== See also ==
- Political party strength in Arizona
- List of state parties of the Libertarian Party (United States)
