= Kathleen Dunbar =

American politician (born 1950)

Member of the Arizona House of Representatives from the 13th district
- In office January 1999 – January 2001
- Preceded by: Brian Fagin
- Succeeded by: Gabrielle Giffords; Carol Somers

Personal details
- Born: October 3, 1950 (age 75) Des Moines, Iowa
- Party: Republican
- Spouse: Dick
- Profession: Politician

Kathleen Dunbar (born October 3, 1950) is a former member of the Arizona House of Representatives. She served in the House from January 1999 through January 2001, representing district 13. She did not run for re-election in 2000, choosing instead to run for the state senate. She ran unopposed in the Republican primary, but lost in the general election to Andy Nichols.
