= Tom Gordon (American politician) =

American politician

Member of the Arizona House of Representatives from the 3rd district
- In office January 1999 – January 2001
- Preceded by: Benjamin Hanley; Jack C. Jackson
- Succeeded by: Albert Tom

Personal details
- Born: Arizona
- Party: Republican
- Education: Brigham Young University (BA); Harvard University (MPA)
- Profession: Politician

Tom Gordon is a former member of the Arizona House of Representatives. He served in the House from January 1999 through January 2001, representing district 3. He did not run for re-election in 2000.
