= Wayne L. Gardner =

American politician

Member of the Arizona House of Representatives from the 29th district
- In office January 1999 – January 2001
- Preceded by: Lela Steffey
- Succeeded by: Russell Pearce

Personal details
- Born: May 19, 1947 (age 79)
- Party: Republican
- Profession: Politician

Wayne L. Gardner (born May 19, 1947) is a former member of the Arizona House of Representatives. He served in the House from January 1999 through January 2001, representing district 29. He did not run for re-election in 2000.
