= Debora Norris =

American politician

Member of the Arizona House of Representatives from the 11th district
- In office January 1997 – January 2003
- Preceded by: Jack A. Brown; Dave Farnsworth

Personal details
- Born: September 23, 1950 (age 76)
- Party: Democratic
- Profession: Politician

Debora Norris (born September 23, 1950) is a former member of the Arizona House of Representatives. She served in the House from January 1997 through January 2003, serving district 11.

== See also ==
- List of Native American politicians
- Native American women in politics
