= 1998 United States Senate election in Arizona =

- November 3, 1998
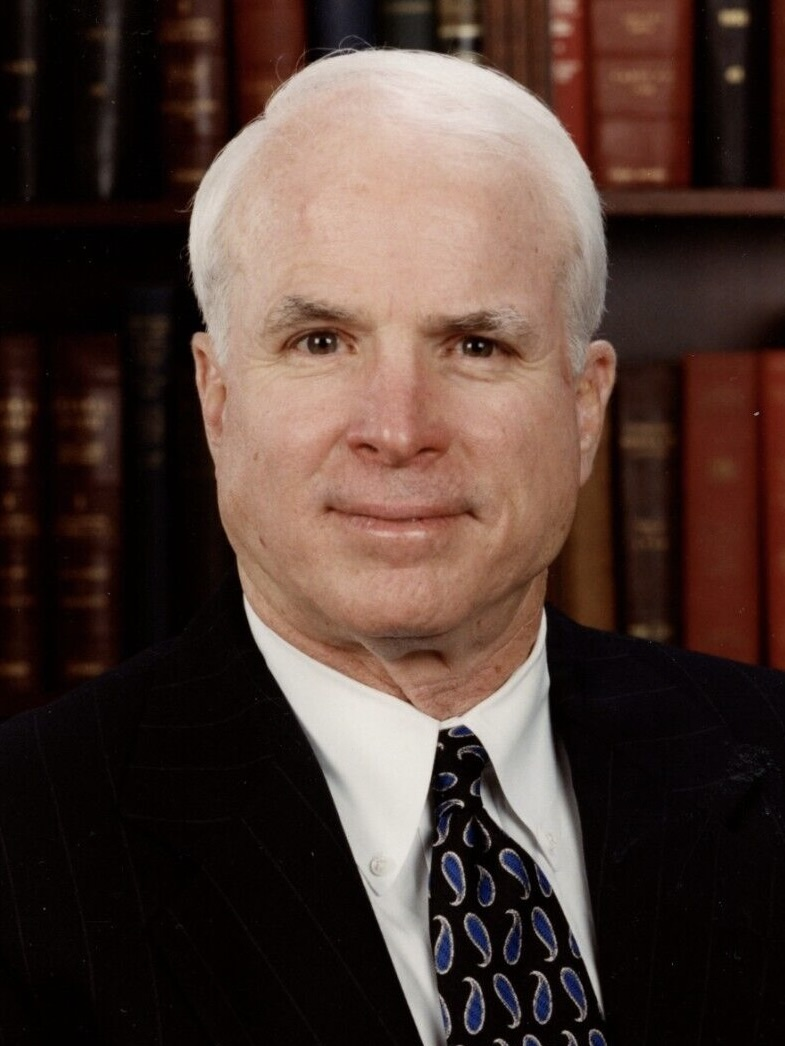

Nominee	John McCain	Ed Ranger
Party	Republican	Democratic
Popular vote	696,577	275,224
Percentage	68.74%	27.16%
- County results McCain: 50–60% 60–70% 70–80%
U.S. senator before election
John McCain
Republican
Elected U.S. Senator
John McCain
Republican

The 1998 United States Senate election in Arizona was held November 3. Republican incumbent John McCain won re-election to a third term in a landslide.

== General election ==
=== Candidates ===
- John McCain, incumbent U.S. senator since 1987 (Republican)
- Bob Park (Reform)
- Ed Ranger, attorney (Democratic)
- John C. Zajac (Libertarian)

=== Polling ===
Poll source	Date(s)	Sample size (Note: Key: A – all adults RV – registered voters LV – likely voters V – unclear)	Margin of error	John McCain (R)	Ed Ranger (D)	John Zajac (L)	Other / undecided (Note: Calculated by taking the difference of 100% and all other candidates combined.)
Harris Insights & Analytics	October 30, 1998	850	—	64%	27%	—	9%
Harris Insights & Analytics	October 20, 1998	732	—	66%	18%	—	16%
Rocky Mountain Behavior Research Center	October 12–15, 1998	519 (RV)	± 4.3%	60%	18%	—	22%
Rocky Mountain Behavior Research Center	July 11–15, 1998	532 (RV)	± 4.3%	58%	16%	3%	23%

=== Results ===
General election result
Party	Candidate	Votes	%	±%
Republican	John McCain (incumbent)	696,577	68.74%	+12.92%
Democratic	Ed Ranger	275,224	27.16%	−4.41%
Libertarian	John C. Zajac	23,004	2.27%	+0.63%
Reform	Bob Park	18,288	1.80%	
Write-in		187	0.02%	
Majority		421,353	41.58%	+17.34%
Turnout		1,013,280		
Republican hold		Swing		

== See also ==
- 1998 United States Senate elections
