= Debra Brimhall =

American politician

Member of the Arizona House of Representatives from the 4th district
- In office January 1997 – January 2003
- Preceded by: Jack A. Brown; Dave Farnsworth

Personal details
- Born: August 13, 1958 (age 67) Cottonwood, Arizona
- Party: Republican
- Spouse: Single/Divorced
- Profession: Politician

Debra Brimhall (born August 13, 1958) is a former member of the Arizona House of Representatives. She served in the House from January 1997 through January 2003, serving district 4. After redistricting in 2002, she ran for re-election in District 5, but lost in the Republican primary to Jake Flake and Bill Konopnicki.
