= Donald R. Aldridge =

American politician

Member of the Arizona House of Representatives from the 1st district
- In office January 1983 – January 1999
- Preceded by: John U. Hays
- Succeeded by: Linda Binder; Barbara Blewster

Personal details
- Born: September 12, 1937 (age 88) Lake Linden, Michigan
- Party: Republican
- Profession: Politician

Donald R. Aldridge (born September 12, 1937) is a former member of the Arizona House of Representatives. He served eight terms in the House from January 1983 through January 1999, representing District 1.
