= Carlos Avelar =

American politician

Member of the Arizona House of Representatives from the 23rd district
- In office January 1999 – January 2003
- Preceded by: Linda Aguirre; David Armstead

Personal details
- Born: April 2, 1954 (age 72)
- Party: Democratic
- Profession: Politician

Carlos Avelar (born April 2, 1954) is a former member of the Arizona House of Representatives. He served in the House from January 1999 through January 2003, serving district 23. After redistricting in 2002, he ran for re-election, this time in District 16, but lost in the Democratic primary to Leah Landrum Taylor and Ben Miranda. He again ran in 2006 in District, but once more lost in the Democratic primary, this time to Cloves Campbell Jr. and Ben Miranda.
