= Christine Weason =

American politician

Member of the Arizona House of Representatives from the 25th district
- In office January 1997 – January 2003
- Preceded by: Robert Updike

Personal details
- Party: Democratic
- Profession: Politician

Christine Weason is a former member of the Arizona House of Representatives. He served in the House from January 1997 through January 2003, serving district 25c.
