= Jean McGrath =

American politician

Member of the Arizona House of Representatives from the 17th district
- In office January 1995 – January 2001
- Preceded by: Brenda Burns
- Succeeded by: Phil Hanson; John B. Nelson

Personal details
- Born: December 23, 1935 (age 90) Muskegon, Michigan, US
- Party: Republican
- Spouse: George

Jean McGrath (born December 23, 1935) is a former member of the Arizona House of Representatives. A Republican, she served in the House from January 1995 through January 2001, representing district 17. She ran for a fourth term in 2000, but lost in the Republican primary.
