= Herschella Horton =

American politician (1938–2022)

Member of the Arizona House of Representatives from the 14th district
- In office January 14, 1991 – January 8, 2001
- Preceded by: Cindy Resnick
- Succeeded by: Edward Poelstra

Personal details
- Born: December 15, 1938 Lawrenceville, Illinois, U.S.
- Died: May 4, 2022 (aged 83) Tucson, Arizona
- Party: Democratic

Herschella Horton (December 15, 1938 – May 4, 2022) was an American politician who served in the Arizona House of Representatives from the 14th district from 1991 to 2001.
