= Jeff Groscost =

American politician (1961–2006)

Jeffrey Smith Groscost (April 29, 1961 – November 3, 2006) was a Republican Speaker of the House at the Arizona House of Representatives from 1997 to 2001.

== Career ==
He was a member of the Arizona House of Representatives for eight years, from 1993 to 2001. Groscost was elected into the House of Representatives in 1992 representing the city of Mesa, Arizona.

In 2000, Groscost was defeated by Democrat Jay Blanchard in the historically Republican District 30 of Mesa.

Groscost became president of an alternative fuels company located in Mesa in 2005. AFV Solutions Inc. announced in July 2005 that Groscost had accepted the offered position with the company, noting "[He has a] unique set of skills and valuable experience". The firm designs and produces fuel converter systems which allow traditional car engines (which run on petrol or diesel) to function with propane.

=== Death ===
Groscost died on 3 November 2006 from a heart attack, in his home in Mesa, at the age of 45.

== Arizona alternate fuels program ==
In 2000, Groscost ordered a Senate bill through the legislature which presented monetary incentives to citizens to buy road vehicles capable of using alternative fuels, in an attempt to reduce the state's pollution. The then Governor, Jane Hull, the second ever woman to serve as the governor of Arizona, signed the bill into law. The bill was revealed to be so munificent that some motorists who bought alternate fueled cars managed to receive half of what they paid back in tax credits. The preliminary estimated cost of the bill was measured at $10 million, after the legislature had closed the program, the real cost was estimated at $200 million. Hull managed to reduce the deficit from $600 million down to $200 million through the passing of an additional bill.

== Personal ==
Groscost was a Latter-day Saint and is survived by his wife and six children.
