= Wesley Marsh =

American politician

Member of the Arizona House of Representatives from the 28th district
- In office January 1995 – January 2003
- Preceded by: Lisa Graham; David Schweikert

Personal details
- Born: November 3, 1961 (age 64) Tallahassee, Florida
- Party: Republican
- Spouse: Lori Davis-Marsh
- Profession: Politician

Wesley Marsh (born November 3, 1961) is a former member of the Arizona House of Representatives. He served in the House from January 1995 through January 2003, serving district 28. Not eligible to run for the House in 2002, due to Arizona term limit laws, he ran for the State Senate in the newly redistricted District 7, but lost in the Republican primary to Jim Waring. Having not served in the house in the prior term, he was once again eligible to run for the house in 2004, and ran in District 7, but lost in the Republican primary to Ray Barnes and David Burnell Smith.
