= Dan Schottel =

American politician

Member of the Arizona House of Representatives from the 12th district
- In office January 1993 – January 2001
- Preceded by: Ruth E. Eskesen; E. D. Jewett Jr.
- Succeeded by: Peter Herschberger

Personal details
- Born: August 10, 1935 (age 90) St. Louis, Missouri
- Party: Republican
- Spouse: Eileen
- Profession: Politician

Dan Schottel (born August 10, 1935) is a former member of the Arizona House of Representatives. He served in the House from January 1993 through January 2001, representing district 12. He could not run for re-election in 2000 due to the amendment to the Arizona Constitution which limited politicians to serving four consecutive terms.
