= Mary Pickens =

American politician

Member of the Arizona House of Representatives from the 14th district
- In office January 1995 – January 2003
- Preceded by: Ruth Solomon

Personal details
- Party: Democratic
- Profession: Politician

Mary Pickens was a member of the Arizona House of Representatives from January 1995 to January 2003, representing district 14.
