= Karen Johnson (Arizona politician) =

American politician

- Born: Mesa, Arizona
- Occupation: Politician

Karen Johnson is an American politician. She served as a Republican member of the Arizona House of Representatives and the Arizona Senate from 1997 to 2008.

== Biography ==
=== Early life ===
Karen Johnson was born in Mesa, Arizona.

=== Career ===
She worked in the Maricopa County Sheriff's Office.

She served as a Republican state congresswoman and senator for the 18th district from 1997 to 2008. In 2000, she introduced a bill to have Arizona secede from the Union if martial law was declared or guns confiscated. In 2008, she sponsored a bill to allow concealed weapons on college and university campuses in Arizona. She lost her senate seat to Russell Pearce in 2008.

=== Personal life ===
She is married to Jerry Johnson. They have eleven children.
