= Laura Knaperek =

American politician (1955–2016)

- Born: July 12, 1955; Chicago, Illinois, U.S.
- Died: March 3, 2016 (aged 60); Tempe, Arizona, U.S.
- Occupation: Politician
- Political party: Republican

Laura Knaperek (July 12, 1955 – March 3, 2016) was an American Republican politician and public official from Arizona. She was first elected to the Arizona state House of Representatives in 1994. She compiled a conservative record while taking an avid interest in youth and family issues. In 2002, she ran for the state Senate, but lost the general election to Democrat Harry Mitchell.

In 2004, she made a comeback, returning to the state House of Representatives, but was defeated for reelection in 2006. While out of office, she became Executive Director of United Families International, a conservative advocacy group. She sought election to the U.S. House of Representatives in 2008 but lost to David Schweikert in the primary election.

== Biography ==
Knaperek was born in Chicago, Illinois, on July 12, 1955. She and her husband moved to Arizona in 1979. Knaperek was first elected to the Arizona House of Representatives in 1994 and was a Republican. She served previously as a school board member for Kyrene School District and worked as the Executive Director for the Arizona Consortium for Children with Chronic Illness. Knaperek served for 10 years in the House where she chaired the powerful Appropriations Committee as well as the Higher Education Committee. She worked on health care, human services and education. After being term limited out of office in 2002, Knaperek ran against incumbent Harry Mitchell as an alternative to his liberal voting record. Knaperek went to work as a columnist for the East Valley Tribune and was recruited to run again in 2004 to take back her former Republican seat. She served for two more years and was voted out due to voter displeasure with Republicans in Congress, the Presidency and the war on terror in Iraq.

She then worked on family issues as the Executive Director of United Families International and ran for Congress to regain the seat from Harry Mitchell. David Schweikert won the primary election in 2008 and ultimately lost to Harry Mitchell in the general election. Knaperek later used her experience and expertise as a political consultant.

== Personal life ==
Knaperek was a member of The Church of Jesus Christ of Latter-Day Saints and left behind six children.

She died from ovarian cancer on March 3, 2016, aged 60, in Tempe, Arizona.
