= Roberta Voss =

American politician (born 1965)

Member of the Arizona House of Representatives from the 19th district
- In office January 1997 – January 2003 Serving with David L. Eberhart, Ted Carpenter
- Preceded by: Scott Bundgaard
- Succeeded by: Chuck Gray; Gary Pierce

Personal details
- Born: January 21, 1965 (age 61)
- Party: Republican
- Profession: Politician

Roberta Voss (born January 21, 1965) is a former member of the Arizona House of Representatives. She served in the House from January 1997 through January 2003, serving district 19. She ran for the Arizona Corporation Commission in 2002. However, she lost the Republican primary to Jim Irvin.
