= W. A. McGibbon =

American politician

Member of the Arizona House of Representatives from the 9th district
- In office January 1993 – January 2001
- Preceded by: Keith Bee; Marion L. Pickens
- Succeeded by: Randy Graf; Marian McClure

Personal details
- Born: April 24, 1943 (age 83) Evanston, Illinois
- Party: Republican
- Spouse: Nancy
- Profession: Politician

W. A. McGibbon (born April 24, 1943) is a former member of the Arizona House of Representatives. He served in the House from January 1993 through January 2001, representing district 9. He could not run for re-election in 2000 due to the amendment to the Arizona Constitution which limited politicians to serving four consecutive terms.
