= Harry R. Clark =

American politician

Member of the Arizona House of Representatives from the 7th district
- In office January 1993 – January 2001
- Preceded by: Frank Arthur Celaya; Richard Pacheco
- Succeeded by: Cheryl Chase (politician); Mark A. Clark

Personal details
- Party: Democratic
- Spouse: Marsha
- Profession: Politician

Harry R. Clark is a former member of the Arizona House of Representatives. He served in the House from January 1993 through January 2001, representing district 7. He could not run for re-election in 2000 due to the amendment to the Arizona Constitution which limited politicians to serving four consecutive terms.
