= Ramon Valadez =

American politician (born 1967)

Pima County Supervisor
- In office September 2003 – 2020
- Preceded by: Dan Eckstrom
- Succeeded by: Matt Heinz

Member of the Arizona Senate from the 10th district
- In office January 2001 – January 2003
- Preceded by: Victor E. Soltero
- Succeeded by: Victor E. Soltero

Member of the Arizona House of Representatives from the 10th district
- In office January 1997 – January 2001
- Preceded by: Carmen Cajero; Phillip Hubbard
- Succeeded by: Linda J. Lopez; Victor Soltero

Personal details
- Born: November 1967 (age 58) Tucson, Arizona
- Party: Democratic
- Spouse: Lucia Lagarda
- Children: Fernando and Daniel
- Education: University of Arizona – College of Engineering and Mines
- Profession: Politician

Ramon Valadez is an American politician who served in the Arizona House of Representatives from 1997 to 2001 and the Arizona State Senate from 2001 to 2003. He was first elected to the House in November 1996, representing District 10, and was re-elected in 1998. In 2000, Valadez ran for the State Senate seat in the same district and won. He ran for re-election in 2002, in the newly redistricted District 29, and won. He did not take the oath of office in January 2003, and was replaced by Victor Soltero.
