= Michael Gardner =

American politician

Michael Gardner (born 1964) is an American politician who served as the Arizona State Representative for the 27th district from 1995 to 2001. He is a member of the Republican Party.

== Career ==
A native of Safford, Arizona, he worked as the General Manager of the Mesa Symphony Orchestra and the Operations director of the Phoenix Symphony Orchestra before running for the Arizona House of Representatives. Gardner is a partner in the government relations firm Triadvocates.
