= Kathi Foster =

American politician (born 1947)

Member of the Arizona House of Representatives from the 14th district
- In office January 1995 – January 2003
- Preceded by: Ruth Solomon

Personal details
- Born: January 21, 1947 (age 79) Chicago, Illinois, U.S.
- Party: Democratic
- Spouse: David
- Profession: Politician

Kathi Foster (born January 21, 1947) is a former member of the Arizona House of Representatives. She served in the House from January 1995 through January 2003, serving district 14. Not eligible to run for the House in 2002, due to Arizona term limit laws, she ran for the State Senate in the newly redistricted District 13, but lost in the Democratic primary to Richard Miranda. She ran again for the Senate in 2004, this time in District 12, but lost in the general election to incumbent Robert Blendu.
