= John Loredo =

American politician

Member of the Arizona House of Representatives from the 22nd district
- In office January 1997 – January 2003
- Preceded by: Joe Eddie Lopez

Member of the Arizona House of Representatives from the 13th district
- In office January 2003 – January 2005
- Succeeded by: Martha Garcia

Personal details
- Born: September 27, 1967 (age 58) Phoenix, Arizona
- Party: Democratic
- Profession: Politician

John Loredo (born September 27, 1967) is a former member of the Arizona House of Representatives from January 1997 until January 2005. Prior to running for the Arizona House, he ran unsuccessfully for the Phoenix City Council in 1992. In 1994 he worked on the unsuccessful campaign for governor of Eddie Basha Jr. He was first elected to the House in November 1996, representing District 22, and was re-elected to that same district in 1998 and 2000. After redistricting in 2002, he ran unopposed for re-election in District 13, along with fellow Democrat Steve Gallardo.
