= Marilyn Jarrett =

American politician and businesswoman (1939–2006)

Member of the Arizona House of Representatives
- In office 1995–2001

Member of the Arizona Senate
- In office 2001–2006

Personal details
- Born: March 4, 1939 Snowflake, Arizona
- Died: March 10, 2006 (aged 67) Phoenix, Arizona
- Party: Republican
- Education: Arizona State University, Brigham Young University
- Occupation: real estate, politician

Marilyn Jarrett (née Black) (March 4, 1939 – March 10, 2006) was an American politician and businesswomen.

== Career ==
Jarrett was born in Snowflake, Arizona. She went to Arizona State University and Brigham Young University. Jarrett was involved in the real estate business and the sew fabric business. She lived in Mesa, Arizona. Jarrett served in the Arizona House of Representatives from 1995 to 2001 and was a Republican. She then served in the Arizona Senate from 2001 until her death in 2006. Jarrett died at St. Joseph's Hospital and Medical Center, in Phoenix, Arizona, after collapsing at her legislative office.

== Legacy ==
She was the last person to lay-in-state at the Arizona State Capitol prior to Senator John McCain in 2018. She was a Latter-day Saint.
