= Richard Kyle (politician) =

American politician

Member of the Arizona House of Representatives from the 6th district
- In office January 1997 – January 2001
- Preceded by: Fulton Brock
- Succeeded by: John Huppenthal; Bob Robson

Personal details
- Born: July 31, 1960 (age 65) Flint, Michigan
- Party: Republican
- Spouse: Cyndi
- Profession: Politician

Richard Kyle (born July 31, 1960) is a former member of the Arizona House of Representatives. He served in the House from January 1997 through January 2001, representing district 6.
