= Jim Carruthers =

American politician (1940–2020)

Member of the Arizona House of Representatives from the 5th district
- In office January 1997 – January 2003
- Preceded by: Pat Conner

Member of the Arizona House of Representatives from the 24th district
- In office January 2003 – January 2005
- Succeeded by: Russell L. Jones

Personal details
- Born: December 4, 1940 Alamosa, Colorado
- Died: July 22, 2020 (aged 79)
- Party: Republican
- Spouse: Jaqueline
- Profession: Politician

James Ross Carruthers (December 4, 1940 – July 22, 2020) was an American politician who served in the Arizona House of Representatives from January 1997 to January 2005. He served as the former president of Arizona Western College, from 1984 to 1997. He was first elected to the House in November 1996, representing District 5, and was re-elected to that same district in 1998 and 2000. After redistricting in 2002, he ran for re-election in District 24 and won. Due to Arizona's term limit law, he was unable to run for re-election in 2004.

He died on July 22, 2020.
