= Dean Cooley =

American politician (1934–2026)

Member of the Arizona House of Representatives from the 21st district
- In office January 1997 – January 2003
- Preceded by: Russell W. Bowers

Personal details
- Born: January 4, 1934 Mesa, Arizona, U.S.
- Died: April 19, 2026 (aged 92) Taylor, Arizona, U.S.
- Party: Republican
- Spouse: Janet
- Profession: Politician

Dean Lavere Cooley (January 4, 1934 – April 19, 2026) was an American politician who was a member of the Arizona House of Representatives. He served in the House from January 1997 through January 2003, serving district 21. Cooley died on April 19, 2026, at the age of 92.
