= Jake Flake =

American politician (1935–2008)

President pro tempore of the Arizona Senate
- In office January 10, 2005 – January 8, 2007
- Succeeded by: Robert Blendu

Member of the Arizona Senate from the 5th district
- In office January 10, 2005 – June 8, 2008
- Preceded by: Jack A. Brown
- Succeeded by: Sylvia Allen

48th Speaker of the Arizona House of Representatives
- In office January 6, 2003 – January 10, 2005
- Preceded by: James Weiers
- Succeeded by: James Weiers

Member of the Arizona House of Representatives
- In office January 13, 1997 – January 10, 2005 Serving with Debra Brimhall (1997–2003); William Konopnicki (2003–2005)
- Preceded by: Jack A. Brown
- Succeeded by: Jack A. Brown
- Constituency: 4th district (1997–2003); 5th district (2003–2005)

Personal details
- Born: Franklin Lars Flake; August 4, 1935 Snowflake, Arizona, U.S.
- Died: June 8, 2008 (aged 72) Show Low, Arizona, U.S.
- Party: Republican
- Spouse: Mary Louise Skouson (m. 1959)
- Children: 13
- Relatives: Jeff Flake (nephew); William J. Flake (great-grandfather)

Franklin Lars "Jake" Flake (August 4, 1935 – June 8, 2008) was an American politician who served as a Senator in the Arizona State Legislature from 2005 until his death. Previous to his term as State Senator, he served as a Representative in the Arizona Legislature, including a stint as Speaker of the House.

== Early life and education ==
Flake was born in Snowflake, Arizona to Virgil Maeser Flake and Gerda Flake, née Hendrickson. He was born Franklin Lars Flake, but his father soon gave him the nickname "Jake", and that is what he was called most of his life. He graduated from Arizona State University in 1960.

== Career ==
Flake was a cattle rancher by profession, and he and three of his brothers raised the Beefmaster breed.

After graduating from college, he returned to Snowflake and lived there until his election to the Arizona House of Representatives in 1996, after which he divided his time between Snowflake and Phoenix. Flake served a mission for his church among the Navajo in the state of Arizona. Previous to entering state politics, he served as president of the Snowflake Arizona Stake of The Church of Jesus Christ of Latter-day Saints.

== Personal life ==
He married Mary Louise Skouson in 1959; they had 13 children and 53 (as of June 11, 2008) grandchildren. Mary Louise was an excellent musician who played French horn in the Silver Creek Symphony, as well as playing the solo piano part with that group on Gershwin’s Rhapsody in Blue. They were members of the Church of Jesus Christ of Latter-day Saints. He was an uncle to U.S. Representative Jeff Flake, who would later become a U.S. Senator and U.S. Ambassador to Turkey.

Flake died on the morning of June 8, 2008. He had been at home recovering from a horseback riding accident. He was succeeded in the Arizona Senate by Sylvia Allen.
