= Mike Gleason (politician) =

American politician

Member of the Arizona House of Representatives from the 15th district
- In office January 1997 – January 2003
- Preceded by: Ned King

Personal details
- Party: Republican
- Profession: Politician

Mike Gleason is a former member of the Arizona House of Representatives. He served in the House from January 1997 through January 2003, serving district 15.
