= John Verkamp =

American politician (born 1940)

Member of the Arizona Senate from the 2nd district
- In office January 2001 – January 2003

Member of the Arizona House of Representatives from the 2nd district
- In office January 1993 – January 2001
- Succeeded by: Jack Jackson, Jr.

Personal details
- Born: July 31, 1940 (age 85) Grand Canyon Village, Arizona, U.S.
- Party: since December 2005, Democrat

John Verkamp (born July 31, 1940) is an American attorney and politician in Arizona. He served as a county attorney for 12 years, and was elected to four terms as a Republican state representative. He served one term as a state senator, but decided not to run for re-election in 2002 after redistricting moved his base of Flagstaff to a primarily Democratic district.

Continuing to disagree with the Republicans over the issues of the Iraq War, which he opposed, in 2005 Verkamp joined the Democrats. He filed to run in 2006 as a Democrat for the United States Senate from Arizona, but was late and failed to qualify for the primary.

== Early life and education ==
John Verkamp was born about 1940 in Grand Canyon Village, Arizona. His family has operated a store at the South Rim of Grand Canyon National Park for three generations, since 1906. He went to elementary and high school there.

He earned his bachelor's degree from the University of Arizona in 1962. He went on to law school, gaining his JD degree in 1965 from the University of Arizona.

Verkamp entered the U.S. Army, serving from 1965 to 1970, in the U.S. and Germany. He achieved the rank of captain.

== Career ==
He built a private practice in Flagstaff, Arizona, where he lived until 2004.

== Political career ==
In 1980, Verkamp was elected as Coconino County Attorney. He was re-elected twice and served a total of three terms, to 1992.

While County Attorney, Verkamp was elected president of the Arizona County Attorneys’ and Sheriffs’ Association in 1985–86. He was active in other related associations.

=== State office ===
In 1992, Verkamp ran for state office and was elected to the Arizona House of Representatives from the 2nd district. He was re-elected three times, serving a total of four terms, until 2000.

That year, he was elected to the Arizona State Senate. During his service he became Chairman of the Commerce Committee. Through this entire period, he worked on issues related to education, health care and the environment.

In 2002, the Republican-dominated state legislature redistricted, moving Flagstaff from its former district, which had included Sedona and Kingman, to a new district containing the Navajo Nation. In recent years, its members have historically supported Democratic Party candidates for the state legislature. Verkamp decided against running for re-election in the new district. His former State Senate seat has been won by Democrats since the redistricting.

In 2004, Verkamp moved from Flagstaff to Phoenix to be near his children and grandchildren. An opponent of the Iraq War, which started in 2003, and a supporter of single-payer health care, Verkamp in December 2005 left the Republican Party over those issues. He filed to run in 2006 as a Democrat for U.S. Senate, saying his opponents were not addressing the Iraq War. As Verkamp was a late entry in the race, he did not gather enough petition signatures to qualify for the September 12 primary election ballot. His opponent in the primary would have been the Democrat Jim Pederson. The Republican incumbent, Jon Kyl, defeated his challenger and won re-election for a third term in November 2006.

== See also ==
- VETPAC
