= Andy Nichols =

American politician (1937–2001)

Member of the Arizona Senate from the 13th district
- In office January 8, 2001 – April 19, 2001
- Preceded by: George Cunningham
- Succeeded by: Virginia Yrun

Member of the Arizona House of Representatives from the 13th district
- In office January 11, 1993 – January 8, 2001
- Preceded by: Patricia Noland
- Succeeded by: Gabrielle Giffords

Personal details
- Born: January 29, 1937 Bardstown, Kentucky, U.S.
- Died: April 19, 2001 (aged 64) Phoenix, Arizona, U.S.
- Party: Democratic
- Spouse: Ann Nichols
- Education: Harvard University (MPH); Stanford University (MD)

Andy Nichols (January 29, 1937 – April 19, 2001) was an American politician who served in the Arizona House of Representatives from the 13th district from 1993 to 2001 and in the Arizona Senate from the 13th district in 2001.

He died on April 19, 2001, in Phoenix, Arizona, at age 64.
