= Jack A. Brown =

American rancher and politician (1929–2015)

Jack A. Brown (May 2, 1929 – October 28, 2015) was an American rancher and politician.

Born in St. Johns, Arizona, Brown received his bachelor's degree in agriculture and economics from Brigham Young University. Brown participated in the real estate business. Brown served in the Arizona House of Representatives from 1963 to 1974, 1987–1996 and from 2004 to 2010. He also served in the Arizona State Senate from 1999 to 2004 and was a Democrat.

Brown was an active member of the Church of Jesus Christ of Latter-day Saints. He served as a missionary for the Church in Brazil from 1948 to 1951. He also served as a bishop over a ward of the Church.
