= 2014 Arizona Attorney General election =

- November 4, 2014
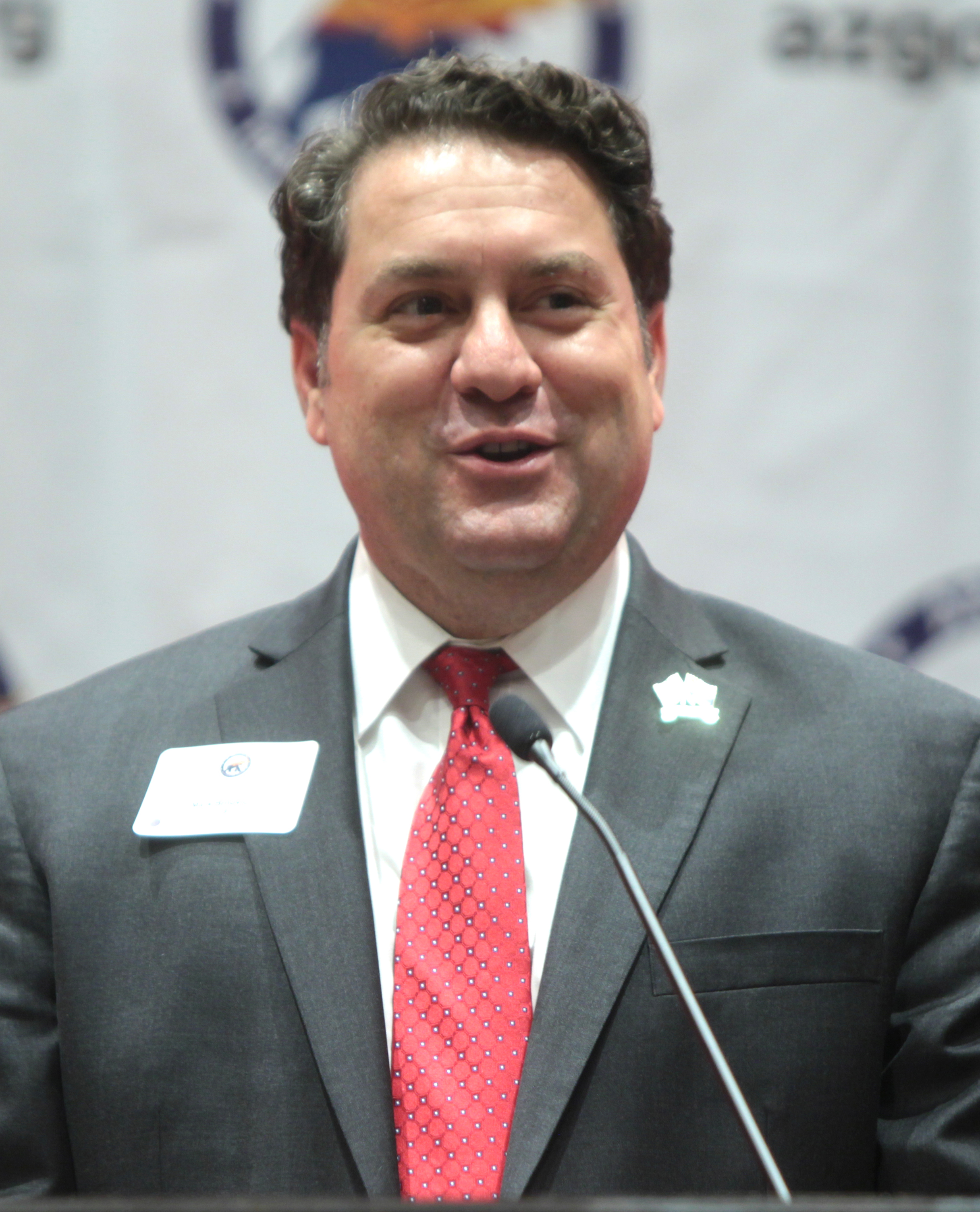

Nominee	Mark Brnovich	Felecia Rotellini
Party	Republican	Democratic
Popular vote	782,361	696,054
Percentage	52.91%	47.07%
- Brnovich: 50–60% 60–70% 70–80% Rotellini: 50–60% 60–70% 70–80%
Attorney General before election
Tom Horne
Republican
Elected Attorney General
Mark Brnovich
Republican

The 2014 Arizona Attorney General election took place on November 4, 2014, to elect the attorney general of Arizona. Incumbent Republican Attorney General Tom Horne ran for re-election to a second term in office. Horne, who was under investigation for multiple violations of election laws, was considered vulnerable in both the primary and general elections. Various Arizona Republicans called for him to resign or endorsed his opponent. Horne lost the Republican primary to Mark Brnovich. Brnovich won the election by a 5.84% margin, defeating Democratic opponent Felecia Rotellini.

== Republican primary ==
=== Candidates ===
- Tom Horne, incumbent attorney general
- Mark Brnovich, director of the Arizona Department of Gaming

=== Polling ===
Poll source	Date(s) administered	Sample size	Margin of error	Tom Horne	Mark Brnovich	Undecided
Magellan Strategies	August 17–21, 2014	1,281	± 2.74%	40%	47%	13%
Harper Polling	August 19–20, 2014	812	± 3.44%	37%	40%	24%
Magellan Strategies	August 15–18, 2014	1,322	± ?	38%	48%	14%
Magellan Strategies	August 12–15, 2014	1,300	± ?	34%	47%	19%
Magellan Strategies	August 5–7, 2014	1,289	± 2.73%	37%	43%	20%
Magellan Strategies	July 28–31, 2014	1,644	± ?	35%	42%	23%
Harper Polling	July 16–17, 2014	885	± 3.29%	26%	37%	37%
Gravis Marketing	July 14, 2014	691	± 4%	29%	44%	27%
Magellan Strategies	July 9–10, 2014	593	± 4.02%	25%	39%	36%
Harper Polling	June 25–26, 2014	791	± 3.48%	28%	33%	39%
Magellan Strategies	June 3–4, 2014	630	± 3.9%	26%	43%	31%
Magellan Strategies	May 13–14, 2014	760	± 3.6%	32%	33%	35%

=== Debate ===
2014 Arizona Attorney General election republican primary debates
No.	Date	Host	Moderator	Link	Republican	Republican
Key: P Participant A Absent N Not invited I Invited W Withdrawn						
Key: P Participant A Absent N Not invited I Invited W Withdrawn					Mark Brnovich	Tom Horne
1	Jul. 27, 2014	Arizona PBS	Ted Simons	PBS	P	P

=== Results ===
Republican primary results
Party	Candidate	Votes	%
Republican	Mark Brnovich	279,855	53.50%
Republican	Tom Horne (incumbent)	240,858	46.05%
Write-in		2,331	0.45%
Total votes		523,044	100.0%

== Democratic primary ==
=== Candidates ===
- Felecia Rotellini, attorney and nominee for attorney general in 2010

=== Results ===
Republican primary results by county Brnovich: 50–60%; Horne: 50–60%; 60–70%

Democratic primary results
Party	Candidate	Votes	%
Democratic	Felecia Rotellini	277,689	98.76%
Write-in		3,492	1.24%
Total votes		281,181	100.0%

== General election ==
=== Debate ===
2014 Arizona Attorney General election debate
No.	Date	Host	Moderator	Link	Republican	Democratic
Key: P Participant A Absent N Not invited I Invited W Withdrawn						
Key: P Participant A Absent N Not invited I Invited W Withdrawn					Mark Brnovich	Felecia Rotellini
1	Sep. 29, 2014	Arizona PBS	Ted Simons	PBS	P	P

=== Polling ===
Poll source	Date(s) administered	Sample size	Margin of error	Mark Brnovich (R)	Felicia Rotellini (D)	Undecided
The Polling Company	October 20–22, 2014	601	± 4%	41%	38%	21%
Tarrance Group	October 13–16, 2014	500	± 4.5%	48%	39%	13%
McLaughlin & Associates	October 12–14, 2014	500	± 4.5%	39%	33%	28%
Moore Information	October 7–8, 2014	400	± ≈4.9%	39%	42%	19%
The Polling Company	October 6–8, 2014	600	± 4%	41%	43%	16%
Tarrance Group	September 15–17, 2014	505	± 4.5%	43%	40%	16%

Hypothetical polling

Poll source	Date(s) administered	Sample size	Margin of error	Tom Horne (R)	Felicia Rotellini (D)	Undecided
Public Policy Polling	February 28–March 2, 2014	870	± 3.3%	36%	42%	22%

=== Results ===
2014 Arizona Attorney General Election
Party	Candidate	Votes	%	±%
Republican	Mark Brnovich	782,361	52.91%	+0.90%
Democratic	Felecia Rotellini	696,054	47.07%	−0.70%
None	Anthony Camboni (write-in)	265	0.02%	−0.21%
Total votes		1,478,680	100.0%	
Republican hold				

=== By congressional district ===
Despite losing the election, Rotellini won five of nine congressional districts, including one held by a Republican.

District	Brnovich	Rotellini	Representative
1st	48.4%	51.6%	Ann Kirkpatrick
2nd	47.3%	52.8%	Martha McSally
3rd	38.3%	61.7%	Raúl Grijalva
4th	67.0%	33.0%	Paul Gosar
5th	62.8%	37.2%	Matt Salmon
6th	57.3%	42.7%	David Schweikert
7th	29.5%	70.5%	Ruben Gallego
8th	60.6%	39.4%	Trent Franks
9th	45.7%	54.3%	Kyrsten Sinema
