= Mark Brnovich =

American attorney and politician (1966–2026)

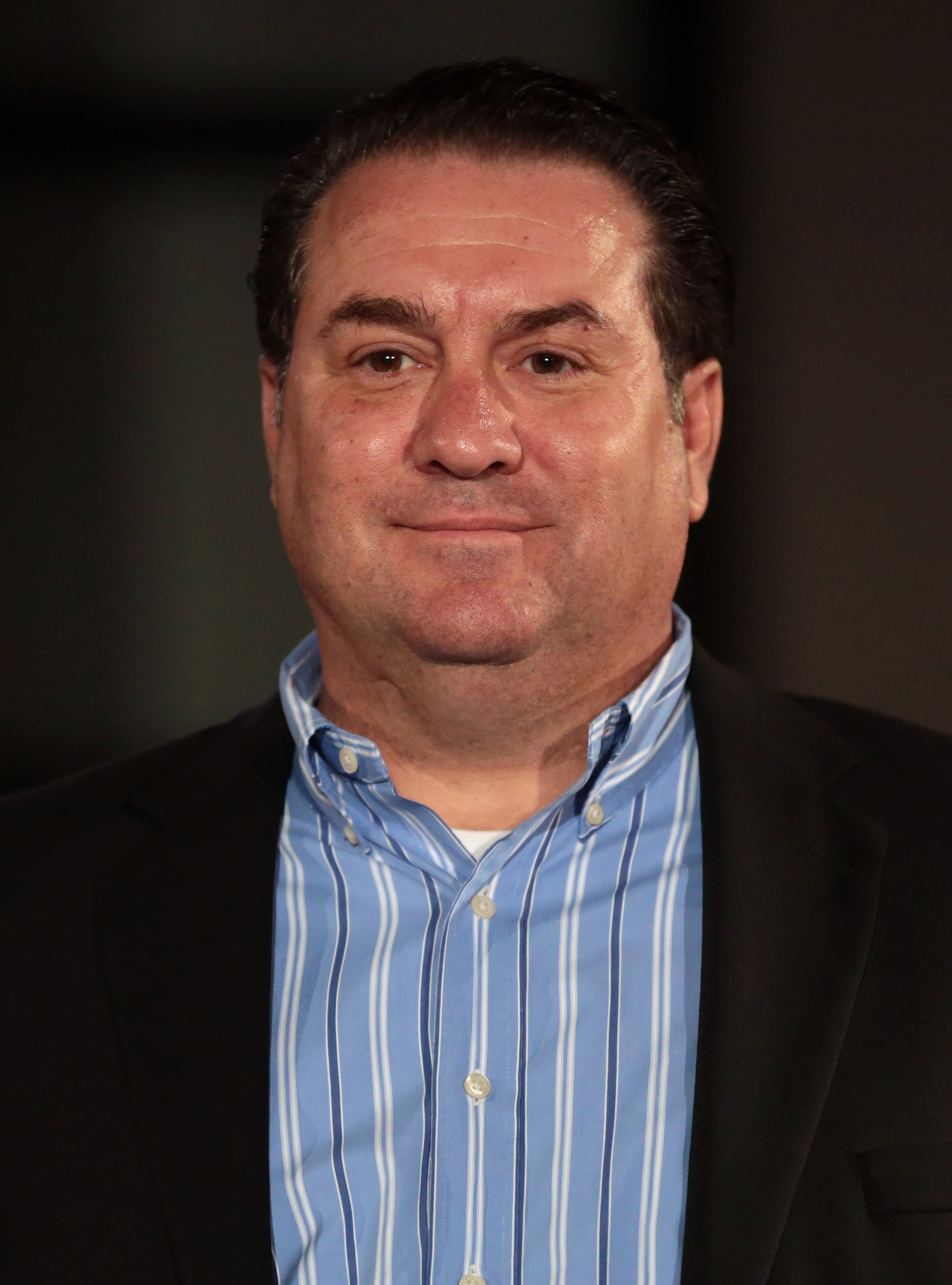
- Brnovich in 2018

26th Attorney General of Arizona
- In office January 5, 2015 – January 2, 2023
- Governor: Doug Ducey
- Preceded by: Tom Horne
- Succeeded by: Kris Mayes

Personal details
- Born: November 25, 1966 Detroit, Michigan, U.S.
- Died: January 12, 2026 (aged 59) Phoenix, Arizona, U.S.
- Party: Republican
- Spouse: Susan Skibba
- Children: 2
- Education: Arizona State University, Tempe (BA); University of San Diego (JD)

Military service
- Allegiance: United States
- Branch: United States Army
- Service years: 1996–2005
- Unit: Army National Guard

Mark Brnovich (November 25, 1966 – January 12, 2026) was an American attorney and politician who was the 26th Attorney General of Arizona from 2015 to 2023. A member of the Republican Party, he was an unsuccessful candidate for its nomination in the 2022 U.S. Senate election in Arizona. Brnovich was also a lobbyist for the Corrections Corporation of America. He was appointed the director of the Arizona Department of Gaming in 2009 and kept the position through 2013.

Prior to serving as State Attorney General, Brnovich served as a Command Staff Judge Advocate with the Army National Guard, worked as the Director of the Center for Constitutional Government at the Goldwater Institute, served as an Assistant U.S. Attorney for the District of Arizona, was a prosecutor with the Maricopa County Attorney's Office, and served as an Assistant Attorney General of Arizona.

In March 2025, President Donald Trump nominated Brnovich to serve as the U.S. Ambassador to Serbia under his second administration. A few months later in October, the nomination was withdrawn by the administration.

== Early life ==
Brnovich was born in Detroit, Michigan, on November 25, 1966. His parents were Serbs who had immigrated from former Yugoslavia, his father from Montenegro, and his mother from Split, Croatia. He said that his mother emigrated to the United States to escape communism. Brnovich and his family moved to Arizona when he was young. They are members of a local Serbian Orthodox parish in Phoenix.

He earned a bachelor's degree in political science from Arizona State University and a Juris Doctor from the University of San Diego School of Law. While at Arizona State, Brnovich was a member of Sigma Pi fraternity.

== Early political career ==
Brnovich served as a Command Staff Judge Advocate with the Army National Guard. He worked as the Director of the Center for Constitutional Government at the Goldwater Institute, as Assistant U.S. Attorney for the District of Arizona, as a prosecutor with the Maricopa County Attorney's Office, and as Assistant Attorney General of Arizona. From 2005 to 2007, Brnovich was a lobbyist for the Corrections Corporation of America. He was appointed the director of the Arizona Department of Gaming in 2009 and kept the position through 2013.

== Attorney General of Arizona ==
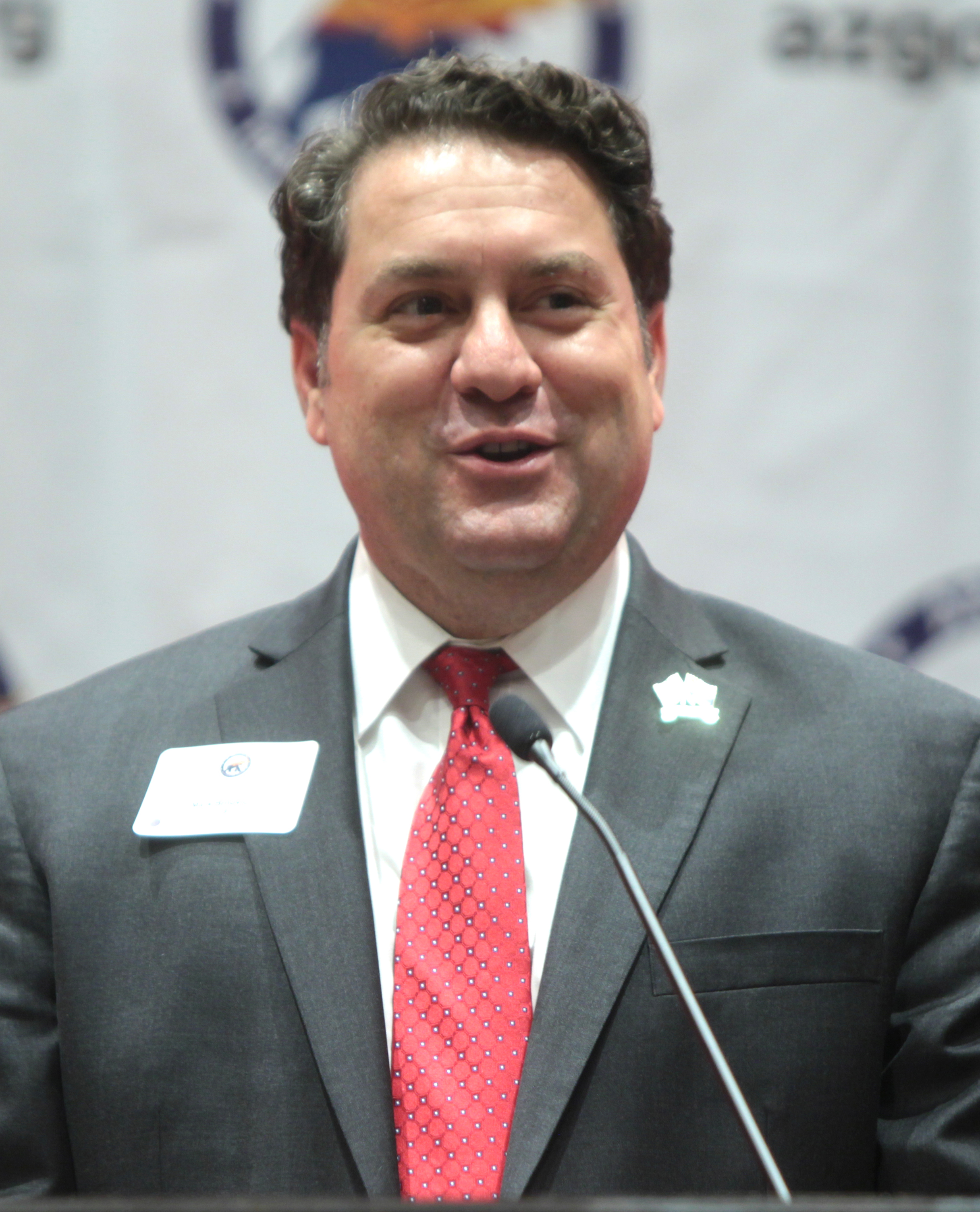
Brnovich in 2014

Brnovich resigned from the Department of Gaming in 2013 to run for Attorney General of Arizona in the 2014 election. He defeated incumbent Tom Horne in the August Republican Party primary election and Felecia Rotellini in the general election. He was inaugurated on January 5, 2015.

=== Americans with Disability Act lawsuits ===
In August 2016, the Arizona Attorney General's office took action in the Maricopa County Superior Court and filed to intervene in over 1,000 lawsuits initiated by an advocacy group that filed a large number of disability access lawsuits targeting mostly small businesses. By intervening, the Attorney General's office made itself a part of the cases and argued that the plaintiffs' group, Advocates for Individuals with Disabilities, exceeded its legal authority and was not allowed to collect fees on these types of lawsuits.

In September 2016, a judge agreed to allow the Attorney General's office to intervene and consolidated the cases while also preventing Advocates for Individuals with Disabilities from filing new lawsuits. In December 2016, the office filed a motion to dismiss the lawsuits and a judge granted the request in February 2017, dismissing over 1,000 of the lawsuits. After the ruling, Brnovich said "Arizona is not going to tolerate serial litigators who try to shake down small hardworking businesses by exploiting the disability community."

=== Consumer protection ===
As attorney general, Brnovich undertook efforts in the area of consumer protection and advocacy, including the opioid epidemic. Notable consumer settlements included a $4.65 million settlement in 2017 with Theranos, Inc. to resolve an Arizona Consumer Fraud Act case over allegations that the company's advertisements misrepresented the accuracy and reliability of more than 1.5 million blood tests sold between 2013 and 2016. Under the settlement, the 76,000 Arizonans who received a blood test over that time period received a full refund (averaging $60.92) and Theranos was also banned from owning, operating, or directing a lab in Arizona for two years.

In 2018, the state announced that a consumer fraud settlement had been reached with General Motors ("GM") that would pay an additional $6.28 million in payments to Arizona consumers as part of claims related to GM's installation of faulty ignition switches. The settlement impacted 33,000 Arizonans who purchased certain cars between 2009 and 2014. According to Brnovich, Arizona was the first state to obtain restitution directly for consumers as part of a settlement with GM related to faulty ignition switch claims. GM previously settled claims with 49 other states, but Arizona filed their own lawsuit focusing on consumer restitution. Under that lawsuit, Arizona would have received $2 million and the money would not have gone to consumers.

In 2018, Brnovich announced that Volkswagen had agreed to settle a consumer fraud lawsuit with the State of Arizona for $40 million over its diesel emissions scandal. The settlement directed $10.5 million to Arizona consumers who had purchased certain Volkswagen, Audi, and Porsche vehicles for restitution, $20 million to the state's budget to help fund K-12 education, and the remaining money for consumer protection and enforcement purposes. Arizona was the only state to obtain additional restitution on behalf of consumers as a result of state enforcement actions.

In October 2020, Brnovich announced a $71 million settlement with Ticketmaster that provided refunds to consumers who purchased tickets to live events in Arizona that were cancelled, postponed, or rescheduled due to COVID-19. The settlement covered 650 Arizona events and allowed consumers to receive a full refund if their event was impacted by COVID-19 and they purchased their tickets before March 14, 2020.

=== Death penalty ===
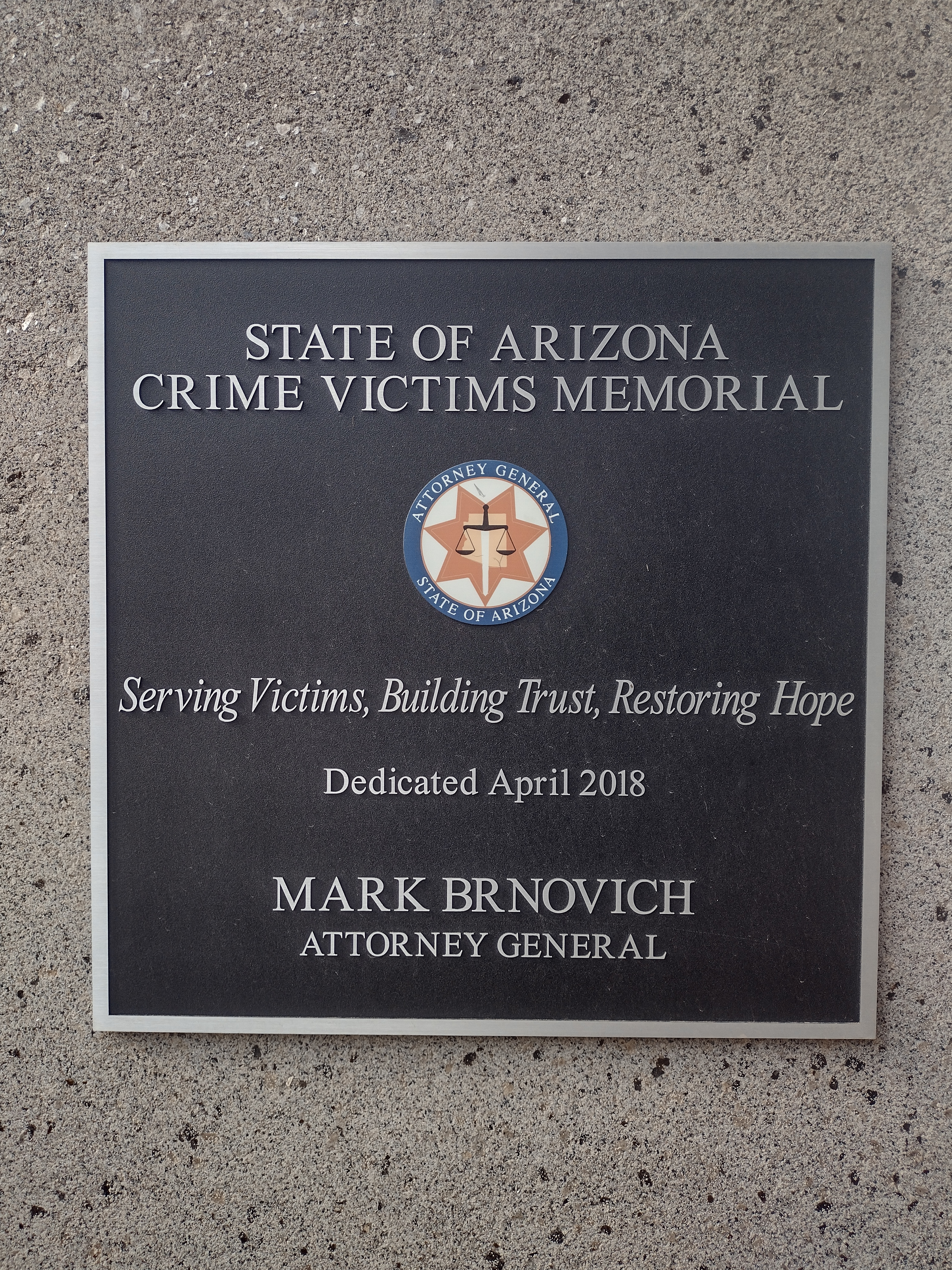
A plaque on a pillar outside the Phoenix office of the Arizona attorney general

Arizona did not carry out an execution between 2014 and 2022. In a 2019 letter to Governor Doug Ducey, Brnovich called for a resumption of executions in Arizona, writing, "Those who commit the ultimate crime deserve the ultimate punishment." In 2021, Brnovich announced that the state would seek warrants of execution for two death row inmates who had exhausted their appeals. In 2021, Brnovich petitioned the U.S. Supreme Court to reverse decisions of the Ninth Circuit Court of Appeals in two death penalty cases. Both inmates were executed at the Florence State Prison in 2022.

=== Environment ===
Shortly after taking office, Brnovich sued the Barack Obama administration for its Clean Power Plan, a carbon emission reduction initiative intended to reduce climate change.

In 2016, Brnovich challenged a decision by the Environmental Protection Agency to impose a more restrictive National Ambient Air Quality Standard (from 75 parts per billion to 70 parts per billion) to improve air quality.

In 2017, Brnovich filed an amicus brief in support of ExxonMobil after the company was issued a subpoena by the Attorney General of New York in an investigation into whether the company had misled investors about the risks posed by climate change. Brnovich's brief defended ExxonMobil and claimed that there was no scientific consensus on climate change.

In 2021, Brnovich joined 11 other states in suing the Biden administration for calculating a social cost caused by climate change (rather than just market costs).

=== Google data privacy ===
In 2018, The Washington Post reported that Brnovich was investigating Google for its alleged practice of recording users' tracking data even after a user opted out of the location tracking function. The investigation was reportedly launched following a 2018 Associated Press article titled "Google tracks your movements, like it or not," which detailed how users are led to believe Google provided users the ability to actually disable their location history. Google told users that "with Location History off, the places you go are no longer stored." The Associated Press reported that this statement was false and that even with location history turned off, Google continues to collect location information through other settings and uses that information to sell ads.

In May 2020, the Arizona Attorney General's Office sued Google, alleging consumer fraud in connection with alleged user privacy violations. The state alleged that Google violated Arizona consumer protection laws by creating Android operating systems that deceived "opt-out" users into believing their personal data is being protected and thereby enriched its advertising revenue.

=== Health care ===
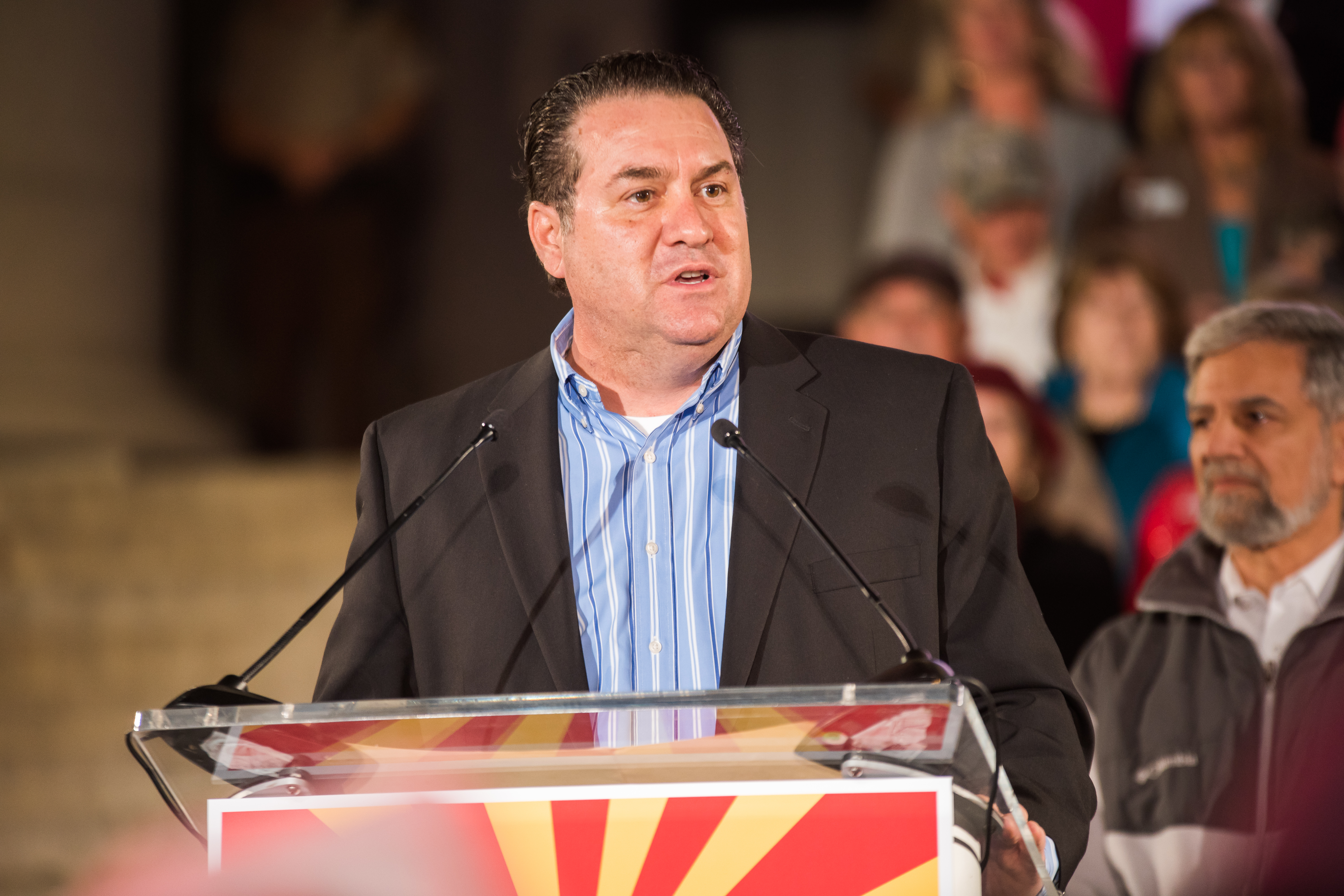
Brnovich speaking at an election event, 2018

Brnovich opposed the Affordable Care Act (ACA) and signed on to lawsuits seeking to invalidate the law. Brnovich argued that the ACA was "deceptive, ineffective and eventually unconstitutional."

=== Immigration ===
Brnovich filed a lawsuit against the Joe Biden administration after the administration halted construction of a wall on the Mexico–United States barrier. Brnovich argued that the border wall was needed because of the adverse environmental impact that migrants might have.

=== Lawsuit against the Arizona Board of Regents ===
On September 8, 2017, Brnovich sued the Arizona Board of Regents, saying the entity in charge of setting tuition for Arizona universities had "dramatically and unconstitutionally" increased tuition and fees over the last 15 years. In the lawsuit, Brnovich said the Board of Regents had "abandoned its duty to serve as a check on the university presidents" by allowing an "unprecedented series of lockstep tuition hikes" that violates the state's constitutional mandate requiring tuition for in-state students at college to be "as nearly free as possible."

The constitutionality challenge included an additional charge against the Board of Regents for continuing to provide in-state tuition for Deferred Action for Childhood Arrivals (DACA) recipient students. A state Court of Appeals previously ruled in June 2017 that DACA students don't have "lawful immigration status" and therefore don't qualify for in-state tuition because of a 2006 voter-approved measure that prohibits in-state tuition and financial aid for undocumented college students. On April 9, 2018, the Arizona Supreme Court ruled in a 7–0 decision that state colleges and universities could no longer provide in-state tuition to individuals who were covered under DACA. That same day, the Arizona Board of Regents announced that they would no longer be providing in-state tuition for DACA students in upcoming semesters.

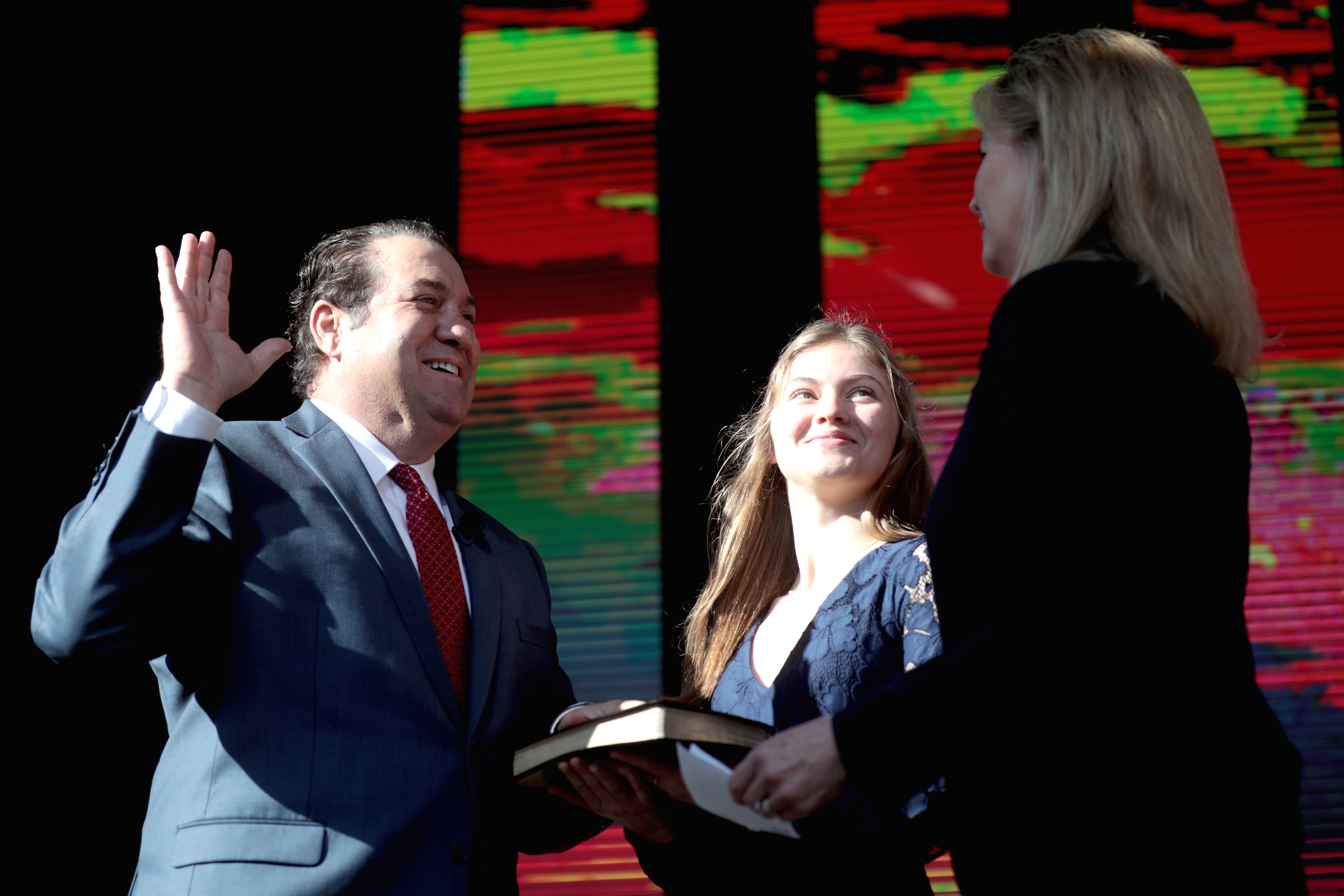
Brnovich being sworn-in to a second term as Attorney General, 2019

In 2019, Brnovich sued Arizona State University (ASU) and the Arizona Board of Regents (ABOR) over a real estate deal that he alleged was illegal because it violated the Arizona Constitution's Gift Clause. Brnovich alleged that a hotel project in downtown Tempe was improperly given a tax exemption because it was being built on tax-exempt university property. Representatives from ABOR and ASU defended the practice, saying they collect a payment from the hotel in lieu of taxes and that extra money helps the school general revenue. The Arizona Tax Court dismissed Brnovich's suit as too late in 2021, and the dismissal was upheld by the Arizona Court of Appeals in 2021. In 2021, a Maricopa County Superior Court judge ruled that Brnovich had to pay almost $1 million of legal fees to the Arizona Board of Regents.

=== LGBT rights ===
In 2015, Brnovich backed a Louisiana amicus brief before the Supreme Court which argued that states should be allowed to prohibit same-sex marriage.

After the U.S. Supreme Court ruled that prohibitions on same-sex marriage were unconstitutional, Brnovich instructed Arizona's child safety agency that only married heterosexual couples should be allowed to adopt children. Arizona Governor Doug Ducey disagreed with Brnovich's legal advice and instructed the department to overturn the policy. Brnovich did not challenge Ducey's order.

In 2016, Brnovich announced that Arizona would join ten other states in a Texas lawsuit against the Barack Obama administration which had directed public schools to allow students to use bathrooms and showers based on their gender identity (even if that is different from the student's biological sex) or risk losing Title IX funding. A U.S. District judge later ordered an injunction against the policy, preventing it from going into effect while on appeal. President Trump rescinded the policy in February 2017, thereby ending the litigation.

In 2017 and 2018, Brnovich defended the right of businesses to refuse to serve same-sex couples when the act would otherwise infringe upon a business owner's religious beliefs. In one case, Masterpiece Cakeshop v. Colorado, the Supreme Court of the United States ultimately ruled 7–2 in favor of a religious baker who refused to bake a cake for a same-sex couple, finding the Colorado Civil Rights Commission violated the bake shop owner's free exercise of religion. In the other case, Brush & Nib v. City of Phoenix, the Arizona Supreme Court found the City of Phoenix's Human Relations Ordinance could not be used to force or punish a business owner to create art (in this case custom calligraphy wedding invitations) that violates a person's "sincere religious beliefs."

In 2019, Brnovich supported efforts to repeal a 1991 Arizona law that prohibited "promotion of a homosexual lifestyle" in public schools, after the law was challenged as unconstitutional.

=== Petition for corporation commissioner's removal ===
In November 2015, Brnovich filed a special action with the Arizona Supreme Court to remove Republican Susan Bitter Smith from her position on the Arizona Corporation Commission over allegations that she had violated state conflict-of-interest laws because of her work in the private sector involving cable companies that are overseen by the office she was elected to. Smith denied wrongdoing. Her subsequent resignation in January 2016 rendered Brnovich's lawsuit moot.

=== Regulatory fintech sandbox ===
In 2018, Arizona enacted legislation making it the first U.S. state to implement a regulatory fintech (financial technology) sandbox. The fintech sandbox is administered by the Arizona Attorney General's Office and was authored and championed by Brnovich, who promoted the initiative as a way to advance fintech start-ups and reduce regulatory hurdles to fintech. In total, ten businesses participated in the initiative.

=== Voting rights and redistricting ===
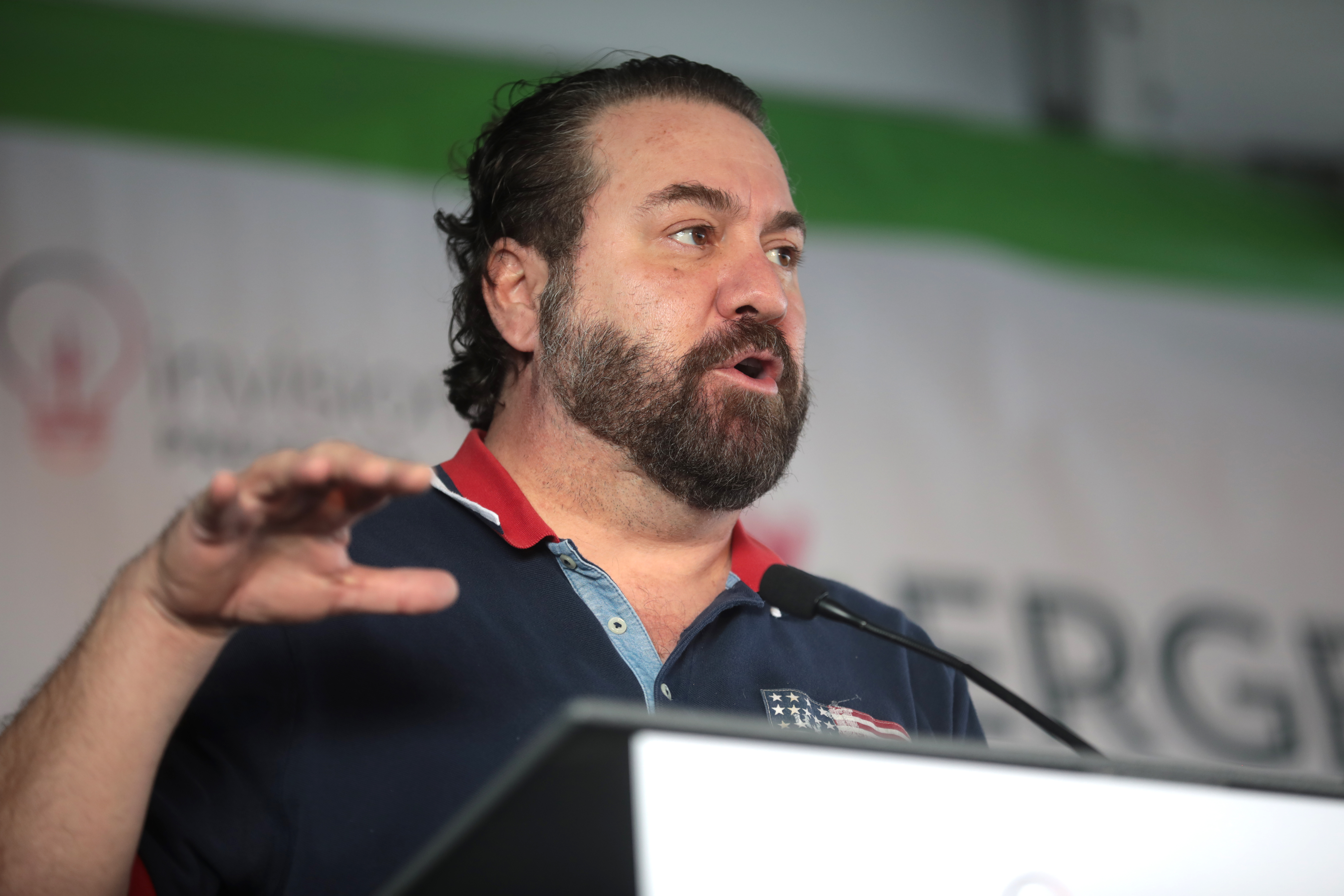
Brnovich speaking at the Converge Tech Summit, 2020

Brnovich personally argued against the map drawn by Arizona's Independent Redistricting Commission before the Supreme Court of the United States on December 8, 2015, in the Harris v. Arizona Independent Redistricting Commission case, arguing that the independent redistricting commission violated the "one person, one vote" principle when some redrawn districts included more residents than others, a process that resulted in a map favorable to Democrats.

After the 2020 election, Arizona's Republican-led Senate hired a cybersecurity firm with no election experience to audit over two million ballots from Maricopa County. In May 2021, the U.S. Department of Justice raised concerns regarding the audit, asking the President of the Arizona Senate to explain what steps were being taken to make sure the audit wasn't violating federal laws, including prohibiting voter intimidation and requiring the preservation of ballots. Brnovich later responded to the Department of Justice and warned the federal government to not intervene in Arizona's audit.

In March 2021, Brnovich personally argued on behalf of Arizona in Brnovich v. Democratic National Committee, where he asked the Supreme Court to uphold Arizona election laws that restricted ballot harvesting and threw out votes that were cast in the wrong precinct. Brnovich argued that these laws were needed to "safeguard election integrity" and that the Arizona laws are "commonplace election administration provisions used by Arizona and dozens of other states". The Supreme Court ruled in a 6–3 decision in favor of the Arizona state voting laws.

After a six-month investigation into alleged 2020 presidential election fraud, Brnovich said in April 2022 that he found no proof of fraud. His interim report claimed that "serious vulnerabilities" had been identified, but it omitted his investigators' findings to the contrary. A more complete report, withheld until Brnovich left office in January 2023, found that none of the allegations of election fraud had merit. In February 2023, Governor Katie Hobbs asked the State Bar of Arizona to conduct an ethics investigation.

=== Other ===
From 2017 to 2018, Brnovich was the Chairman of the Conference of Western Attorneys General, a non-partisan organization of Attorneys General. Brnovich chose to focus his Chair's Initiative on cyber security and data privacy.

From 2017 to 2018, Brnovich was appointed to Protecting America's Seniors: Attorneys General United Against Elder Abuse, a bipartisan group of state attorneys general The initiative was established to focus on strengthening efforts nationwide to combat elder abuse.

In December 2017, Brnovich was recognized by the Arizona Capitol Times as a "Leader of the Year" in the category of Public Safety. The Capitol Times stated: "It's his non-political work in the area of law enforcement and consumer protection and advocacy that is earning Brnovich a lot of praise. In addition to going after fraudsters and scammers, Brnovich had zeroed in on the opioid epidemic, busting suspected opioid rings and in a bold move, charging a major manufacturer of the drug of deceptive practices designed to reap profits at patients' expense."

Brnovich worked with Representative Shawnna Bolick to draft a bill allowing human and sex trafficking victims to take civil action against their perpetrators. The bill was signed into law in March 2021.

== 2022 U.S. Senate race ==
In June 2021, Brnovich launched a campaign for the Republican primary for the United States Senate in the 2022 election. Considered a frontrunner in the primary, Brnovich was criticized by former President Donald Trump for not seeking to overturn the Arizona election results from the 2020 U.S. presidential election, which Trump lost to Joe Biden. After almost a year of holding a solid polling lead, in May 2022, Brnovich was surpassed in the polls by self-funded candidate Jim Lamon.

== U.S. Ambassadorship nomination ==
On March 28, 2025, President Donald Trump nominated Brnovich as the next ambassador of the United States to Serbia, but later withdrew it in October 2025 before it could be sent to the U.S. Senate for a hearing.

== Personal life and death ==
Mark Brnovich was married to Susan Brnovich, a United States district judge of the United States District Court for the District of Arizona. They had two children.

On January 12, 2026, Brnovich died after having a heart attack at his home in Phoenix. He was 59 years old. His family announced his death the following day. Following his death, Governor Katie Hobbs ordered flags at all state buildings to be lowered to half-staff.

== Electoral history ==
=== 2014 ===
2014 Arizona Attorney General Republican primary results
Party	Candidate	Votes	%
Republican	Mark Brnovich	279,855	53.50%
Republican	Tom Horne (incumbent)	240,858	46.05%
Write-in		2,331	0.45%
Total votes		523,044	100.0%

2014 Arizona Attorney General election results
Party	Candidate	Votes	%	±%
Republican	Mark Brnovich	782,361	52.91%	+0.90%
Democratic	Felecia Rotellini	696,054	47.07%	−0.70%
None	Anthony Camboni (write-in)	265	0.02%	−0.21%
Total votes		1,478,680	100.0%	
Republican hold				

=== 2018 ===
2018 Arizona Attorney General Republican primary results
Party	Candidate	Votes	%
Republican	Mark Brnovich (incumbent)	561,370	100.0
Total votes		561,370	100.0

2018 Arizona Attorney General election results
Party	Candidate	Votes	%
Republican	Mark Brnovich (incumbent)	1,201,398	51.73%
Democratic	January Contreras	1,120,726	48.26%
Write-in		346	0.01%
Total votes		2,322,470	100.00%
Republican hold			

=== 2022 ===
2022 Arizona U.S. Senate Republican primary results
Party	Candidate	Votes	%
Republican	Blake Masters	327,198	40.24%
Republican	Jim Lamon	228,467	28.10%
Republican	Mark Brnovich	144,092	17.72%
Republican	Michael McGuire	71,100	8.75%
Republican	Justin Olson	41,985	5.16%
Write-in		226	0.03%
Total votes		813,068	100.0%

Legal offices
Preceded by Tom Horne	Attorney General of Arizona; 2015–2023	Succeeded by Kris Mayes
