= Felecia Rotellini =

Chair of the Arizona Democratic Party

Chair of the Arizona Democratic Party
- In office January 27, 2018 – January 23, 2021
- Preceded by: Alexis Tameron Kinsey
- Succeeded by: Raquel Terán

Personal details
- Born: Sheridan, Wyoming, U.S.
- Party: Democratic
- Education: Rocky Mountain College (BA); University of Notre Dame (JD)

Felecia Rotellini is an American attorney and politician who served as chair of the Arizona Democratic Party from 2018 to 2021. Rotellini spent 13 years as an assistant state attorney general before serving as the superintendent of the Arizona State Banking Department under Governor Janet Napolitano. She twice ran for attorney general in 2010 and 2014.

== Early life and education ==
Felecia Rotellini was born in Sheridan, Wyoming, to Clarice (née Koebbe) and Anselmo "Sam" Rotellini.

Rotellini developed an interest in politics due, in part, to her paternal grandfather who was a coal mining union organizer in the now defunct-town of Cambria, Wyoming. While attending Rocky Mountain College, Rotellini participated in a Girls Staters event where Senator Gale W. McGee urged the crowd to "each make a political commitment." As part of the activities of the event, Rotellini was elected as one of the "councilmen" for the mythical town of Cottonwood City.

Rotellini received her bachelor's degrees in history and political science (magna cum laude) from Rocky Mountain College in 1981, and a Juris Doctor from Notre Dame Law School in 1986.

== Career ==
She passed the State Bar of Arizona bar examination in 1986 and was admitted to the State Bar of Arizona on October 25, 1986.

Rotellini began her career working as an attorney in private practice from 1986 until 1992. She then served as an assistant attorney general for the State of Arizona from 1992 until 2005, then was the Assistant Superintendent of Arizona Department Finance Institutions from 2005 until 2006, and was appointed in 2006 as the superintendent by Governor Janet Napolitano and served until 2009.

In August 2009, Rotellini resigned from her appointed position as superintendent to join the Phoenix law firm of Zwillinger & Greek PC.

In 2010 and 2014, Rotellini ran unsuccessfully for Arizona Attorney General.

In 2018, Rotellini was elected state party chair over LD-16 Chair Scott Prior.

== Election results ==
Arizona Attorney General 2010
Party	Candidate	Votes	%
Republican	Tom Horne	870,483	51.9
Democratic	Felecia Rotellini	807,185	48.1
Total votes		1,677,668	100

Arizona Attorney General 2014
Party	Candidate	Votes	%
Republican	Mark Brnovich	782,361	52.88
Democratic	Felecia Rotellini	696,054	47.04
Write-ins	Other	1,212	0.08
Total votes		1,479,627	100

Party political offices
Preceded by Bill Roe; Acting	Chair of the Arizona Democratic Party; 2018–2021	Succeeded by Raquel Terán
