= Tom Horne =

Canadian-American attorney & politician

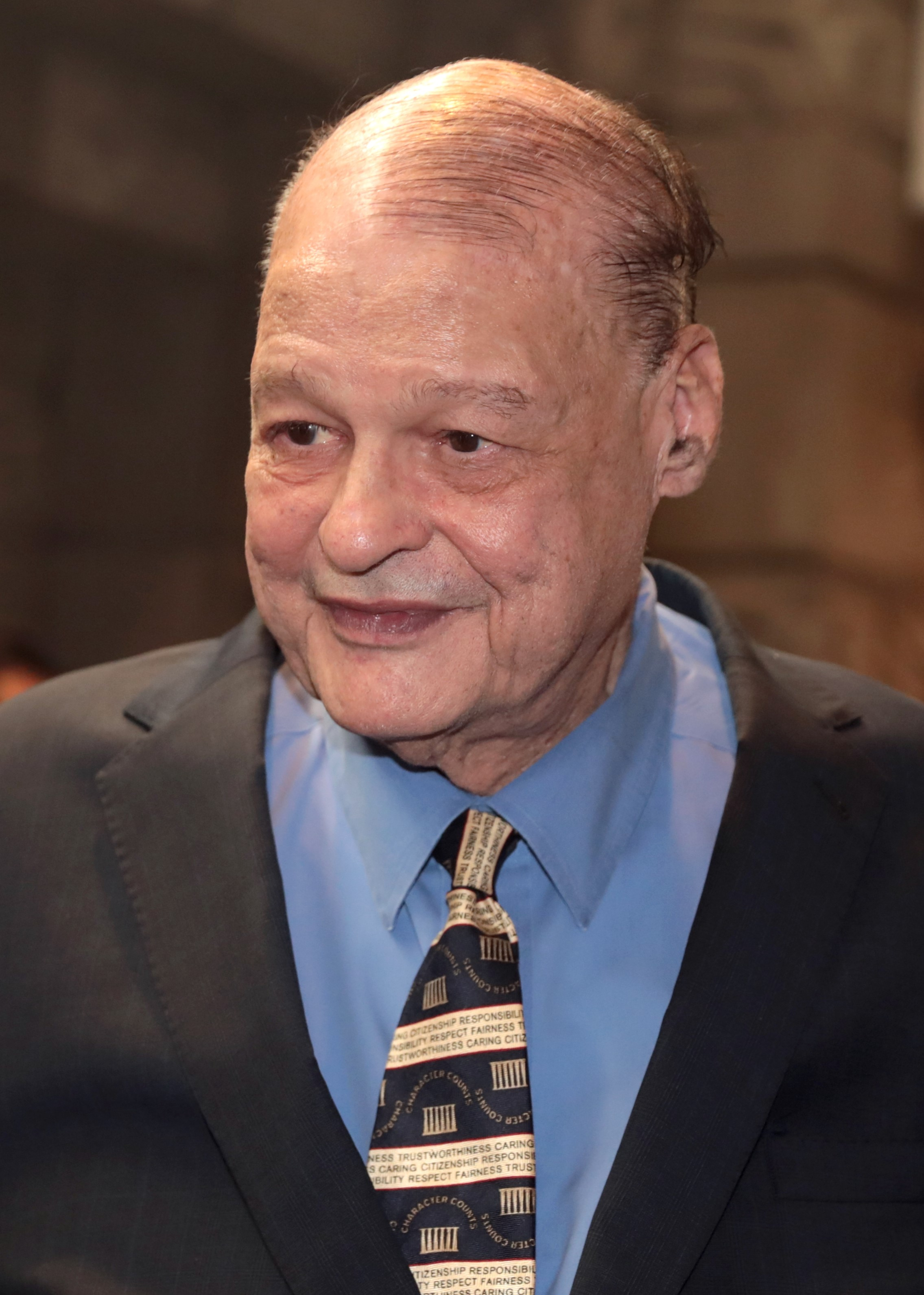
- Horne at an event in Phoenix in 2023

19th and 23rd Arizona Superintendent of Public Instruction
- Incumbent
- Assumed office January 2, 2023
- Governor: Katie Hobbs
- Preceded by: Kathy Hoffman
- In office January 1, 2003 – January 1, 2011
- Governor: Janet Napolitano; Jan Brewer
- Preceded by: Jaime Molera
- Succeeded by: John Huppenthal

25th Attorney General of Arizona
- In office January 3, 2011 – January 5, 2015
- Governor: Jan Brewer
- Preceded by: Terry Goddard
- Succeeded by: Mark Brnovich

Member of the Arizona House of Representatives from the 24th district
- In office January 1997 – January 2001 Serving with Barbara Leff
- Preceded by: Ernest Baird; Sue Grace
- Succeeded by: Stephen Tully

Personal details
- Born: Thomas Charles Horne; March 28, 1945 (age 81) Montreal, Quebec, Canada
- Party: Republican
- Spouse: Martha (died 2019)
- Children: 5 (1 deceased)
- Education: Harvard University (BA, JD)

Thomas Charles Horne (born March 28, 1945) is an American politician, attorney, businessman, and activist serving as Arizona superintendent of public instruction since 2023, having previously served from 2003 to 2011. Previously, he was attorney general of Arizona from 2011 to 2015. He is a member of the Republican Party.

Horne was first elected Arizona attorney general in 2010. He ran for re-election in 2014, losing renomination to Mark Brnovich in the Republican primary. In 2022 he was elected superintendent of public instruction, defeating incumbent Democrat Kathy Hoffman. He lost renomination in the Republican primary to Kimberly Yee in 2026.

== Early life and education ==
Horne was born in Quebec to Polish Jewish parents. He was raised in New York, and became a naturalized U.S. citizen in 1954.

He graduated from Mamaroneck High School in the early 1960s. He graduated from Harvard College in 1967 and Harvard Law School in 1970. Soon after graduating from law school, he moved to Arizona.

Horne was a Democrat before becoming a Republican. He attended the March on Washington in 1963.

== Early career ==
Horne was first elected to public office in 1979, when he was elected to the Paradise Valley Unified School District board. He served on the board for the next 24 years, and was board chair for ten of those years.

He was elected to the Arizona House of Representatives in 1996, and served from 1997 to 2001.

In 2000, Horne ran for the Arizona Senate for District 24, but lost the Republican primary to Dean Martin.

== State superintendent of public instruction (2003–2011) ==
In 2003, Horne was elected Arizona superintendent of public instruction; he served two terms, ending in 2011.

Horne oversaw the adoption to new Arizona's social studies standards, implemented beginning in the 2007-08 school year, under which all students "learn lessons in five areas including American history, world history, geography, civics and government, and economics" in each year from kindergarten through high school.

He was an advocate for full-day kindergarten, citing research that showed that such programs reduce the achievement gap between students from poor households and those from more affluent homes.

He also pushed for nutritional standards that removed junk food vending machines from elementary schools and created incentives for secondary schools to do so on a voluntary basis.

Horne, a classically trained pianist and founder of the Phoenix Baroque Ensemble, advocated for increasing arts education in schools.

He also continued to implement the Arizona Instrument to Measure Success standardized test; performance on the AIMS test (either alone or in combination with Advanced Placement exams and International Baccalaureate exams) determines graduating high school students' qualification for a "high honors" diploma, which guarantees free tuition at Arizona's three public universities.

Horne implemented policies that discouraged bilingual education and sought to shut down the Tucson Unified School District's controversial Mexican American Studies Department Programs. Speaking at Tucson High in 2007, legendary activist Dolores Huerta said that Republicans hate Latinos. Horne brought his Latina deputy, Margaret Garcia Dugan, to offer a rebuttal at the school, but students turned their backs to her and put their fists in the air.

After this event, Horne argued that the Tucson ethnic studies programs "separated students by race, taught them that they are oppressed, and was influenced by Marxist and communist philosophies." He drafted a 2010 state law (which was adopted and went into effect in 2011, as HB 2281) that effectively banned ethnic studies, and led to the Tucson Unified School District board closing its program in January 2012.

A group of students and parents sued over the state law, leading to seven years of legal proceedings. In July 2017, Horne testified in the litigation; in his testimony, he defended the law and asserted that the Tucson program was led by radical teachers. The federal district court, later in 2017, ultimately issued a permanent injunction blocking Arizona from enforcing the law, determining that the decision to ban the Tucson program was "motivated by a desire to advance a political agenda by capitalizing on race-based fears" and was unconstitutional.

== Attorney general of Arizona (2011–2015) ==
On November 2, 2010, Horne defeated Felecia Rotellini in the race for Arizona attorney general in the 2010 elections. Horne defeated Rotellini by a margin of 51.9% to 48.1%.

=== Arizona v. United States ===
Within a few weeks of Horne becoming attorney general, his office filed an appearance in Arizona v. United States, defending the governor and the state against the Obama administration's federal court challenge to S.B. 1070. The previous A.G., Terry Goddard, had withdrawn from the case, acceding to the demands of Governor Jan Brewer.

=== Consumer and antitrust litigation ===
Shortly after winning the 2010 election, Horne announced his intent to pursue violations of the Arizona Consumer Fraud Act and other consumer protections violations. This led to a string of sting operations against auto repair businesses in the Valley.

Along with state attorney generals in many other states, Horne's office represented Arizona in multi-state settlements with the nation's five largest mortgage servicers (Arizona's share was $1.6 billion of a $25 billion nationwide deal involving 49 AGs); with SiriusXM (Arizona's share was $230,000 of the $3.8 million settlement), and with Pfizer Inc. (over allegations of unlawful promotion of Rapamune; Arizona's share was $721,169 out of the nationwide $35 million settlement).

Along with attorneys general of the other 49 states and the District of Columbia, the Federal Trade Commission (FTC), and the Federal Communications Commission, Horne reached a $105 million settlement with AT&T Mobility LLC ("AT&T"), resolving allegations that AT&T engaged in "mobile cramming." Arizona received $325,770, and it is estimated that roughly 482,000 accounts in Arizona were eligible for refunds.

=== Sex trafficking ===
In 2013, Horne requested additional funds to combat sex trafficking, saying the funding was especially crucial as Arizona prepared to host the Super Bowl in 2015. He said the influx of men at events like that tends to increase underage sex trafficking.

=== Arizona v. Inter Tribal Council case ===
In a 2012 United States Supreme Court case, Arizona v. Inter Tribal Council of Arizona, Inc., Horne argued that Arizona's voter registration requirements were not preempted by the National Voter Registration Act of 1993. The Court ruled in favor of the Native American tribes, and against Horne and Arizona, by a 7–2 vote. The decision stated: "Arizona is correct that the Elections Clause empowers Congress to regulate how federal elections are held, but not who may vote in them. The latter is the province of the states." However, because Horne's predecessor as attorney general had not appealed an adverse decision by the commission, the case was sent back for a new petition to the commission to be appealed. It was consolidated with a 10th Circuit case, which ruled adversely, and the Supreme Court chose not to review a second time. The Court also held that Arizona may petition to have more requirements added to the federal standard.

=== School resource officers and firearms regulations ===
In 2012, after the Connecticut school massacre, he proposed that a principal or a designee be trained and armed in each school. "The ideal solution would be to have an armed police officer in each school," Horne stated. "The next best solution is to have one person in the school trained to handle firearms, to handle emergency situations, and possessing a firearm in a secure location."

In 2013, Horne wrote an opinion that defended the state preemption of regulation of firearms; he found that Tucson's city gun laws were unenforceable. Also in 2013, he proposed legislation that would allow teachers to carry guns in public schools.

=== Same-sex marriage ===
Horne threatened to sue the city of Bisbee, Arizona, over its 2013 ordinance recognizing same-sex couples. He withdrew the threat several days later when Bisbee agreed to rewrite the ordinance, removing rights reserved for married couples under Arizona law. In October 2014, a federal judge ruled that Arizona's law banning gay marriage was unconstitutional. Horne did not appeal, stating he felt there was "zero" chance of the ruling being overturned, adding, "I think it is over."

=== Immigration ===
In 2013, Horne sued Maricopa County Community College District and Pima Community College, seeking to compel the community colleges to end their policy of providing in-state tuition for "dreamers" (undocumented immigrants who came to the U.S. as children). Horne argued that these students were disqualified from in-state tuition by state law, even if the federal government had approved them to remain and work in the U.S. under the Deferred Action for Childhood Arrivals (DACA) program. Several students held protests at Horne's office, leading to some being arrested. Horne denied being anti-immigrant, saying he was one himself, being born in Canada. In 2015, a Maricopa Superior Court judge ruled that the "dreamers" could pay in-state tuition rates. However, the State appealed the decision, and in 2017, the Arizona Court of Appeals sided with the attorney general's office (then led by Horne's successor, Mark Brnovich), ruling that the dreamers were not eligible for in-state tuition.

In 2014, Horne criticized Immigration and Customs Enforcement (ICE) for sending undocumented immigrants from Texas to Arizona.

=== Colorado City disputes ===
In 2014, a federal jury awarded a couple living in Colorado City, Arizona $5.2 million for religious discrimination. Horne on behalf of Arizona and the Utah attorney general intervened in the case of Cooke v. Colorado City. Colorado City and Hildale, Utah (both dominated by the FLDS Church, a Mormon fundamentalist group), as well as the twin cities' utility companies, were found liable for violating federal and state housing discrimination laws by refusing to provide water and sewer services to a non-FLDS couple because of their religion.

Horne criticized the Colorado City police force (known as "the marshal's office"), saying it acted as an arm of the FLDS Church instead of the law. In 2012 Horne allocated $420,000 to the Mohave County Sheriff's Office to patrol Colorado City. In 2012, Horne renewed an effort to persuade the state legislature to abolish Colorado City's six-member police department, and assign the Mohave County Sheriff's Office to carry out law enforcement functions in the city. After this effort failed, Horne asked for a federal judge to disband the Colorado City police force, after legislation he supported to do so failed to pass. The court denied the motion, but also instructed the office to avoid discrimination.

=== Campaign-finance investigations ===
==== Winn-Horne investigation ====
In 2012, after an FBI investigation that was concluded in September, 2012, Maricopa County Attorney Bill Montgomery concluded that Horne had coordinated with an independent expenditure committee run by Kathleen Winn during his 2010 general election campaign for attorney general, thus violating campaign finance laws.

In 2013, Horne and his wife sued the Arizona Public Integrity Alliance and three of its directors, in Maricopa County Court. Horne claims in court that a conservative group had defamed him on TV, Facebook, and a website, falsely claiming that the FBI was still investigating him for campaign violations. The Hornes claimed the defendants made the statements to "intentionally to deceive the public as part of a strategy to illegitimately undermine Mr. Horne's public standing before the 2014 election where Mr. Horne will be campaigning to be re-elected as the Arizona attorney general."

In April 2014, an administrative law judge concluded that the prosecution in the case "failed to establish by a preponderance of the evidence" that Horne illegally coordinated with the independent expenditure committee, and recommended that the case be dropped.

In May 2014, Yavapai County Attorney Sheila Polk, to whom that matter had been referred, rejected the administrative judge's recommendation, and issued a final administrative decision ordering Horne and Winn to reimburse campaign donors $400,000. Horne and Winn appealed to the Maricopa County Superior Court, which upheld Polk's decision. In May 2017, however, the Arizona Supreme Court voided the lower-court decisions, agreeing with Horne and Winn that they were denied due process because Polk was involved in the prosecution's strategy and case preparation. The case was sent back to the Attorney General's Office for a final administrative decision.

The state attorney general's office referred the case to Cochise County Attorney Brian McIntyre for a final administrative decision, and in July 2017, McIntyre issued a report clearing Horne of wrongdoing. McIntyre wrote that "Both sides to this dispute present equally plausible explanations as to what did or did not occur" during communications between Horne and Winn, and wrote, "The record, unfortunately, supports a conclusion that the investigation being conducted was not a search for the truth, but rather, only intended to shore up conclusions already drawn." After the decision, Horne's attorney said that "Justice ha[d] finally prevailed" for Horne, and described Polk as "an overzealous prosecutor who chose to act as 'judge, jury and executioner.'"

==== Use of office staff for campaign ====
A separate investigation was prompted by allegations that Horne had used office staff to campaign for his 2014 re-election campaign. In 2014, a former AG staff member and ex-Horne campaign volunteer alleged that much of Horne's executive office staff was involved in "substantial campaigning" for his 2014 re-election, "while on state time and utilizing State resources," in violation of law. Horne denied the allegations.

In July 2014, the Arizona Secretary of State's Office found probable cause that Horne had violated several campaign-finance laws by having employees do campaign work for his campaign on state time, at the attorney general's office. Horne was denounced by several fellow Arizona Republicans, including congressmen Jeff Flake and Matt Salmon and Maricopa County Attorney Bill Montgomery. The allegations contributed to Horne's defeat in the 2014 Republican primary to Mark Brnovich (a campaign in which Governor Jan Brewer endorsed Brnovich).

The Maricopa County Attorney's Office declined to bring any criminal charges, determining that the statute of limitations on misdemeanor charges had lapsed and that there was not a reasonable likelihood of convicting Horne of a felony. Separately, the complaint to the Secretary of State's office led to the appointment of two independent investigators (one of whom was a former Arizona Court of Appeals judge) as special attorneys general. They concluded, in an October 2017 report, that Horne had illegally used his office staff to work on his re-election campaign, but that criminal charges were unwarranted, and that the $10,000 civil penalty that Horne paid to the Arizona Citizens Clean Elections Commission in 2014 was "deemed sufficient" to resolve the issue. The decision also ordered Horne to refile his 2014 campaign finance reports to account for the value of campaign work performed by office staff, as well as for the "market value of rent on a campaign office."

=== Unsuccessful campaign for renomination in 2014 ===
On August 26, 2014, Horne was defeated in his reelection campaign in the Republican primary by Mark Brnovich. Brnovich defeated Horne by a margin of 54% to 46%.

== Activities from 2015 to 2020 ==
=== Outlaw Dirty Money Act ===
In 2017, Horne joined with Terry Goddard, the Democratic former mayor of Phoenix and Arizona attorney general, to promote the Outlaw Dirty Money Act, a ballot measure to combat "dark money" (secret campaign spending) by requiring the public disclosure of all major donors to efforts to oppose or support candidates or ballot measures. Goddard and Horne criticized spending by various dark-money operators, including the Koch network. Conservative groups sued to prevent the citizen initiative from appearing on the Arizona ballot, contending there were an insufficient number of valid voter signatures to make it to the ballot. In August 2018, the Arizona Supreme Court agreed, knocking the initiative from the ballot. Many of the signatures disqualified in the ruling were thrown out because they were collected by 15 paid gatherers who failed to respond to subpoenas requiring them to appear in court for the lawsuit.

=== Representing African American victims of police brutality ===
In 2018, Horne filed a claim with the city of Phoenix seeking $50 million in damages on behalf of Edward Brown, who lost his ability to walk when a Phoenix police officer shot him in the back.

In 2019, Horne filed a notice of claim on behalf of Dravon Ames and his fiancée, Iesha Harper. Dravon accused Phoenix police allegedly pointed a gun in his face and threatened to shoot him during their May 27 encounter with police in an apartment complex parking lot.

Also in 2019, Horne filed the claim seeking compensation for the family of 19-year-old Jacob Harris, who was shot and killed by police as he ran away from officers. This document claimed there was no visual proof that Harris was involved in an armed robbery on that night, nor proof he turned toward police and reached for a gun.

== State superintendent of public instruction (2023–present) ==
=== 2022 election ===
In 2021, Horne announced his campaign for a third term as Arizona superintendent of public instruction, challenging Democratic incumbent Kathy Hoffman. In the November 2022 election, Horne narrowly defeated Hoffman.

=== Tenure ===
In 2023, Horne sued the governor, attorney general, and an Arizona school district over a dispute on how English-language learner students in Arizona should be taught. In the lawsuit, Horne contended that the 50-50 Dual-Language Immersion model, one of four methods used to teach such students in Arizona, violates Proposition 203, a 2000 ballot initiative.

In 2024, Horne told lawmakers that the state faced a crisis in teacher retention caused by low salaries and a lack of support. He called on lawmakers to pass proposals that would increase teacher pay, and penalize school systems that do not aggressively pursue student discipline complaints from teachers. Horne told the House Education Committee that the state faced a "public sector crisis," with thousands of teachers leaving every year and not enough new teachers coming in to replace them.

In 2024, Horne announced $48 million for more armed campus officers and counselors in schools. In 2025, he committed to backing pay for armed officers on school campuses amid a freeze on federal dollars from the U.S. Department of Education.

In January 2024, he announced that the state would cooperate with PragerU, urging schools to adopt it as part of their curriculum. The announcement was met with criticism, since the organization has been accused of promoting climate change denial, anti-LGBTQ+ politics, and whitewashing history. House of Representative Democrat Raúl Grijalva criticized the announcement, stating, "It’s masquerading as a serious educational resource when in reality it's unaccredited right-wing propaganda."

Although he is a supporter of Arizona's Empowerment Scholarships, in 2025 Horne required his agency to continue cracking down and denying questionable Empowerment Scholarship Accounts (ESA) purchases. Some of the purchases the Arizona Department of Education denied included a $5,000 Rolex watch, a $24,000 golf simulator, and a $16,170 cello.

== Personal life, legal and business career ==
Horne was married to his wife, Martha, for 47 years. She died in 2019. The couple had five children, one of whom died at age three.

Horne was a trial lawyer. He served as a teacher of Legal Writing at Sandra Day O'Connor College of Law, and wrote a text on construction law published by the State Bar of Arizona.

He was the president of T.C. Horne & Co., an investment firm he founded in the late 1960s, while he was a student at Harvard Law School. The firm went bankrupt in 1970, and in 1973, the Securities and Exchange Commission banned Horne from the securities industry for life. The 1973 SEC report said that that as president of T.C. Horne & Co, Horne "among other things, violated the record-keeping, anti-fraud, and broker-dealer net capital provisions of the federal securities laws and filed false financial reports with the commission. Without admitting or denying the allegations, Horne consented to the SEC’s filings, and did not oppose the SEC’s sanctions. He said the SEC ban was the result of computer errors, and computers had only recently come into regular use by accounting firms at the time and were not as reliable as they are today.

“The use of the computers was resulting in inaccurate financial data,” Horne said.

From 1997 to 2002, Horne failed to disclose the bankruptcy in corporate filings to the Arizona Corporation Commission. When asked in 2010 about the omissions, he said he had forgotten about the bankruptcy that took place 40 years prior.

In October 2007, while state superintendent of public instruction, Horne was cited for criminal speeding in Scottsdale, Arizona. During a subsequent year-and-a-half period, he was cited for speeding six additional times, including once in a school zone. The criminal speeding charge was settled by a "civil plea agreement" (i.e., as a traffic offense).

In March 2012, while tailing Horne as part of an investigation into campaign finance law violations, FBI agents observed him leaving the scene of an accident. Horne caused more than $1,000 worth of damage to a car he backed into before leaving the scene—ostensibly, according to FBI agents, to hide an extramarital affair with a subordinate. An FBI agent took a picture of a black mark on the parked car, which was shown on the front page of the newspaper. The FBI report stated that Montano (owner of the car) said that he was unaware the vehicle had been hit by another vehicle until SA Grehoski called him to arrange for the interview. Montano said that the black mark on the front passenger side of the bumper came from when his son was parking the vehicle in the garage. Realizing that it was questionable whether Horne did any damage, the city attorney agreed to a settlement in which Horne paid a $300 fine. The same FBI agent was accused of lying on the stand during the trial.

== See also ==
- Arizona Memory Project Video on Histories of Arizona Jewish Residents: Tom Horne interview

Political offices
Preceded by Jaime Molera	Arizona Superintendent of Public Instruction; 2003–2011	Succeeded by John Huppenthal
Preceded by Kathy Hoffman	Arizona Superintendent of Public Instruction; 2023–present	Incumbent
Legal offices
Preceded by Terry Goddard	Attorney General of Arizona; 2011–2015	Succeeded by Mark Brnovich
