= Alexis Tameron Kinsey =

American politician

Chair of the Arizona Democratic Party
- In office January 26, 2015 – October 13, 2017
- Preceded by: Bill Roe
- Succeeded by: Felecia Rotellini

Personal details
- Born: Superior, Arizona
- Party: Democratic
- Spouse: Adam Kinsey
- Education: Arizona State University

Alexis Tameron Kinsey is a former chairman of the Arizona Democratic Party. Tameron Kinsey, was chief of staff for Congressman Harry Mitchell and campaign manager on Richard Carmona's 2012 U.S. Senate bid. She was the first woman to lead the Arizona Democratic Party. Tameron Kinsey was a super delegate to the 2016 Democratic National convention, she did not endorse a candidate before the convention.

Tameron Kinsey stepped down in October 2017 after selling her home and changing Legislative Districts which left her no longer eligible to serve in the role.

In 2019, Valley Metro hired Tameron Kinsey to be the agency's Chief of Staff and a senior advisor to the CEO. As of 2023, Tameron Kinsey serves as the director of governmental relations for the agency.
