= 2010 Arizona Proposition 112 =

Referendum on citizen initiative petitions

- 2 November 2010
- PROPOSITION 112

Results
| Choice | Votes | % |
|---|---|---|
| Yes | 792,664 | 49.99% |
| No | 792,858 | 50.01% |
- Results by county
Yes
50-60%
No
50-60%

2010 Arizona Proposition 112 was a proposed amendment to the Constitution of Arizona to change the filing deadline for citizen initiative petitions from four months prior to an election occurring, to six months prior. The amendment was narrowly defeated, with just 194 more votes cast in opposition than in support.

== Background ==
House Concurrent Resolution 2018 of the 49th Legislature Second Regular Session, 2010 placed the measure on the ballot. The primary sponsor was State Rep. John McComish, and the resolution also had 7 other sponsors.

On March 15, 2010, the legislation passed the State House, with 54 votes in favor, and 5 legislators either voting present or not voting, and on April 29, it passed the State Senate, with 27 "Yeas" and 3 Present or NV.

== Viewpoints ==
The measure had bipartisan support, which was further evident with its unanimous legislative backing. Those in favor argued that the deadline of four months prior did not provide sufficient time for signatures to be checked to see if they were properly filed, processed, and counted.

President of the Arizona State Senate Robert L. Burns urged voters to join him "in voting yes to pass Proposition 112 on Election Day," explaining that the referendum would "improve our state's election process regarding citizen ballot initiatives," and that it would "simply [move] the filing deadline for initiative petition signatures from four to six months prior to Election Day." He reasoned that "Providing more time for the signature review phase [would] allow for a more thorough verification process for each initiative that appears on the election ballot," and would ensure "that signatures are properly filed, processed, counted, and verified." This, he said, would "only strengthen our electoral system and citizen's initiative process." Other supporters included State Rep. Chad Campbell. The Arizona Daily Star backed the amendment, describing it as "a common-sense solution" that "merits a 'yes' vote."

There was no organized opposition movement to the amendment. However, groups running initiative petition campaigns for the 2010 ballot said that the signature requirement, which was higher than most other states, was hard to reach, and that the deadline being moved would make it even more difficult.

== Results ==
| County | Yes | | No | |
| County | # | % | # | % |
|---|---|---|---|---|
| Apache | 7,848 | 43.12 | 10,354 | 56.88 |
| Cochise | 18,432 | 48.58 | 19,508 | 51.42 |
| Coconino | 15,950 | 43.82 | 20,451 | 56.18 |
| Gila | 8,435 | 51.36 | 7,988 | 48.64 |
| Graham | 4,005 | 48.56 | 4,242 | 51.44 |
| Greenlee | 1,063 | 48.14 | 1,145 | 51.86 |
| La Paz | 1,962 | 48.65 | 2,071 | 51.35 |
| Maricopa | 447,532 | 49.32 | 459,901 | 50.68 |
| Mohave | 25,817 | 53.02 | 22,874 | 46.98 |
| Navajo | 12,820 | 47.41 | 14,220 | 52.59 |
| Pima | 156,336 | 53.60 | 135,360 | 46.40 |
| Pinal | 32,864 | 45.72 | 39,016 | 54.28 |
| Santa Cruz | 4,303 | 48.76 | 4,522 | 51.24 |
| Yavapai | 39,721 | 52.29 | 36,249 | 47.71 |
| Yuma | 15,576 | 51.01 | 14,957 | 48.99 |
| State total | 792,664 | 49.99 | 792,858 | 50.01 |

== Aftermath ==
Following the voters' narrow rejection of the amendment, an automatic recount was triggered based upon state law requiring that any constitutional amendment ballot measure approved or rejected by less than or equal to 200 votes is rechecked. The first tally of votes showed the measure had been defeated by approximately 125 votes, (Note: One source says that the measure initially failed by 123 votes, while another says 128.) but following the recount, it failed by 194 votes. The recount was the first-ever recount of a ballot measure in the state's history, and was the smallest margin a ballot measure had ever been defeated by in the state's history. The findings of the recount were certified by the Hon. Robert H. Oberbillig on December 20, 2010. After the recount, Arizona Secretary of State Ken Bennett concluded that the small change in vote amounts was to be expected because of the large number of ballots that were being re-evaluated, but that the final tally was still very similar to how the original count was. He went on to say, "This exercise confirmed the accuracy of our voting system and should give voters confidence in the integrity of Arizona elections".
