= Arizona Consumer Fraud Act =

1967 Arizona state law

Arizona State Legislature
- Full name: Arizona Consumer Fraud Act
- Introduced: 26 January 1967
- Signed into law: 13 March 1967
- Sponsor(s): Arizona House Republican majority leader D. Delos Ellswort
- Governor: Jack Williams
- Resolution: HB 114

Status: Current legislation

The Arizona Consumer Fraud Act (ACFA) is a package of Arizona state laws that give protections to consumers in almost any kind of transaction related to the sale or advertisement of merchandise. Both the state and a private citizen may bring action under the act, however a private citizen's lawsuit must be brought within one year from the date of the claim.

== Powers and protections given by the ACFA ==
The ACFA gives consumers in Arizona recourse in the event of fraudulent marketing and sales. A brochure released by the State of Arizona Financing Fraud Division states:

For example, if a car dealer sold a used car which he knew could not be safely driven, it would not only be a violation of the Act for him to state that the car was in good shape, but it would also be a violation if he failed to disclose the fact that the car could not be safely driven.

Merchants who willfully violate the ACFA may be required to pay up to $10,000 per violation.

It also gives broad powers to the Attorney General to investigate fraud already committed or about to be. For instance, Consumer Protection Law Developments states that the Attorney General has the power to "issue subpoenas, administer oaths or affirmations, and conduct hearings in order to carry out his duties under the ACFA."

== History ==
The AFCA was first introduced as House Bill 114 by Arizona House Republican majority leader D. Delos Ellsworth. The minutes from the House Commerce and Industry Committee said this:

House Bill 114 was introduced by Chairman Ellsworth who then introduced Attorney General Darrell Smith to explain the purpose of this Bill and their reasons for endorsing it. He stated that this Bill is to stop the fraud that now exists in the selling of many goods to the consumer, and the need for legislation to protect them from such. Mr. Smith introduced Mr. Philip Marquardt, an assistant on the staff of the Attorney General. Mr. Marquardt gave additional information in explaining that this Bill will also protect the merchant as well as the consumer from such frauds. It will also help to retain money for the state that is now being taken out of the state by those who are defrauding and leaving the state immediately thereafter and moving on to other places.

House Bill 114 was passed as an emergency measure and signed into law by Jack Williams on March 13, 1967.

=== Judicial precedent ===
==== Application against pharmaceutical companies ====
In 2015 Arizona applied consumer fraud law for the first time against pharmaceutical companies, joining Illinois and Minnesota. The Arizona Court of Appeals allowed action under the ACFA against Medicis Pharmaceutical for marketing acne medication containing minocycline, known to cause a lupus-like autoimmune response.

==== 2012 ruling that ACFA funds must be returned to consumers ====
In the 2012 case of State of Arizona vs AutoZone, AutoZone was charged under the ACFA for multiple instances of mispricing merchandise from 2001 - 2006. The state of Arizona sought disgorgement instead of returning funds to consumers. After review, the Arizona Supreme Court ruled disgorgement was not authorized under the ACFA.

== Cases brought by State of Arizona ==
Arizona Attorney General Mark Brnovich announced April 19, 2016 legal action against Volkswagen for violating the ACFA after the company admitted to using defeat devices to skew vehicle emissions in 2015. Around 4,000 Arizona residents were affected, placing the potential penalty at $40 million.

Diamond Resorts settled for $800,000 on December 23, 2016, after the company was sued by Arizona under the ACFA for misleading consumers about timeshares. Some of the allegations included increasing maintenance fees, membership resale and buy-back programs, timeshare resale market, ability to rent timeshares, and discounts on travel needs.

Arizona brought an ACFA case against Theranos, reaching a $4.65 million settlement in 2017. Arizona consumers who were affected received refunds in the mail. The average refund was $60.92. The largest refund was $3,411. Under the terms of the settlement Theranos was banned for two years from blood-testing.

Attorney General Brnovich announced a $6.28 million settlement with General Motors LLC in March 2018 as part of a faulty ignition switch-related settlement. Under the settlement, approximately 33,000 Arizona consumers who purchased GM vehicles between July 2009 and July 2014 are eligible for payments. Consumers will receive a minimum of $200 each. Arizona was the only state to obtain restitution directly for consumers.
