= 2010 Arizona elections =

- November 2, 2010

The 2010 Arizona state elections were held on November 2, 2010, with primaries on August 24, 2010. These include state-level offices and both chambers of Congress. A special election was also on May 18 for Proposition 100.

== U.S. Senate ==
John McCain announced his plans to run again for Senate on November 25, 2008, just 21 days after losing the 2008 presidential race. McCain faced a primary challenge from former representative J.D. Hayworth, and Jim Deakin. The Democratic candidates were Rodney Glassman, Rudy Garcia, and John Dougherty.

In the general election, the candidates were incumbent John McCain (R), Rodney Glassman (D), Jerry Joslyn (G), and David Nolan (L).

== U.S. House of Representatives ==
Elections were held for all Arizona's congressional districts, with elections in the 1st, 3rd, 5th, and 8th congressional districts being among the more heavily contended.

Republican John Shadegg, the incumbent in the 3rd district, announced that he would not seek re-election on January 14, 2010. On the Republican side, Ben Quayle, son of former vice-president Dan Quayle, announced his on February 12, 2010, despite never voting in a local election. Other notable Republicans in the race include former state representative Sam Crump, former state senators Pamela Gorman and Jim Waring, and former Paradise Valley Mayor Vernon Parker. The only Democrat in that race is Jon Hulburd.

Both the 5th and 8th districts' Democratic incumbents, Harry Mitchell and Gabby Giffords, respectively, are seeking reelection. Mitchell faces a Republican challenge from former Maricopa County Treasurer David Schweikert, Jeffrey W. Smith, Jim Ward while Giffords' biggest Republican challengers include former State Senator Jonathan Paton and construction manager Jesse Kelly.

== Governor ==
On January 20, 2009, Janet Napolitano was confirmed as United States Secretary of Homeland Security by Barack Obama and resigned as governor the next day. Since Arizona does not have a lieutenant governor, Secretary of State Jan Brewer took over office. Brewer announced her intentions to run for full term in November 2009. The other Republican candidates were state treasurer Dean Martin, Owen "Buz" Mills, former Arizona Board of Regents president John Munger, Matthew Jette, and Tom Gordon. At one point, Sheriff Joe Arpaio was considering a run for governor, but eventually declined. On June 2, 2010, John Munger dropped out of the race.

The only Democratic challenger was Attorney General Terry Goddard. The Libertarian Party had Ronald Cavanaugh, Bruce Olsen, Alvin Ray Yount, and Barry Hess facing off while Larry Gist was on the ballot for the Green Party.

Jan Brewer won the Republican primary with approximately 80% of the vote while Democrat Terry Goddard moved on with no opposition. Barry Hess won the Libertarian primary and Larry Gist won the Green primary. Incumbent Jan Brewer won the election with 54.3% of the vote.

== Secretary of State ==
2010 Arizona Secretary of State election
- November 2, 2010
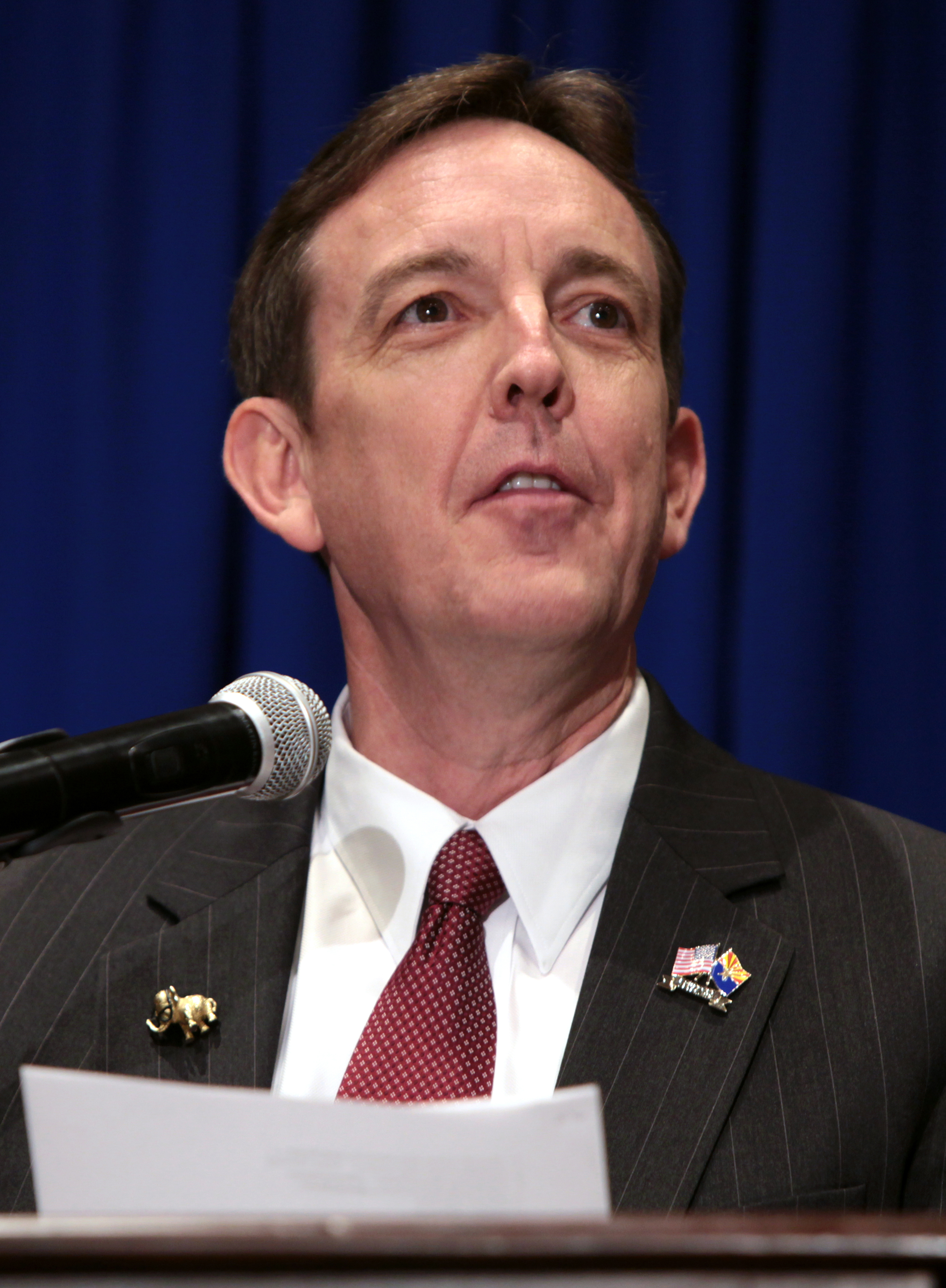

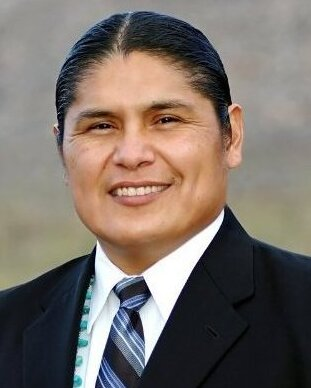
Nominee	Ken Bennett	Chris Deschene
Party	Republican	Democratic
Popular vote	966,934	694,131
Percentage	58.21%	41.79%
- Bennett: 40–50% 50–60% 60–70% 70–80% 80–90% >90% Deschene: 50–60% 60–70% 70–80% 80–90% >90% Tie: 50% No data
Secretary of State before election
Ken Bennett
Republican
Elected Secretary of State
Ken Bennett
Republican

When Jan Brewer succeeded Janet Napolitano as governor, she appointed Republican Ken Bennett to replace her as Secretary of State. Bennett later went on to seek a full term.

=== Republican primary ===
==== Candidates ====
- Ken Bennett, incumbent.

==== Primary results ====
Republican primary results
Party	Candidate	Votes	%
Republican	Ken Bennett (incumbent)	474,650	100
Total votes		474,650	100

=== Democratic primary ===
==== Candidates ====
- Chris Deschene, state representative.
- Sam Wercinski, former Arizona Real Estate Commissioner.

==== Primary results ====
Democratic primary results
Party	Candidate	Votes	%
Democratic	Chris Deschene	174,314	62.79
Democratic	Sam Wercinski	103,286	37.21
Total votes		277,600	100

=== Third party candidates ===
- Michelle Lochmann (Green) (write-in, withdrawn)

=== General election ===
==== Debate ====
2010 Arizona Secretary of State election debate
No.	Date	Host	Moderator	Link	Republican	Democratic
Key: P Participant A Absent N Not invited I Invited W Withdrawn						
Key: P Participant A Absent N Not invited I Invited W Withdrawn					Ken Bennett	Chris Deschene
1	September 22, 2010	KAET	Ted Simons	Arizona PBS	P	P

==== Endorsements ====
Ken Bennett (R)

Organizations

- Arizona Association of Realtors
- Arizona Chamber of Commerce and Industry
- Arizona Citizens Defense League
- Arizona 2010 Project
- Arizona Right to Life

Newspapers

- East Valley Tribune
Chris Deschene (D)

U.S. Representatives

- Raúl Grijalva, U.S. Representative from Arizona's 7th congressional district.

Organizations

- Arizona League of Conservation Voters

Labor unions

- Arizona AFL-CIO

Newspapers

- Tucson Weekly

==== Polling ====
Poll source	Date(s) administered	Sample size (Note: Key: RV – registered voters LV – likely voters)	Margin of error	Ken Bennett (R)	Chris Deschene (D)	Neither	Undecided
Moore Information	October 12–13, 2010	500 (LV)	± 4%	46%	28%	2%	23%

==== Results ====
2010 Arizona Secretary of State election
Party	Candidate	Votes	%
Republican	Ken Bennett (incumbent)	966,934	58.21
Democratic	Chris Deschene	694,131	41.79
Total votes		1,661,065	100
Republican hold			

== Attorney General ==
2010 Arizona Attorney General election
- November 2, 2010
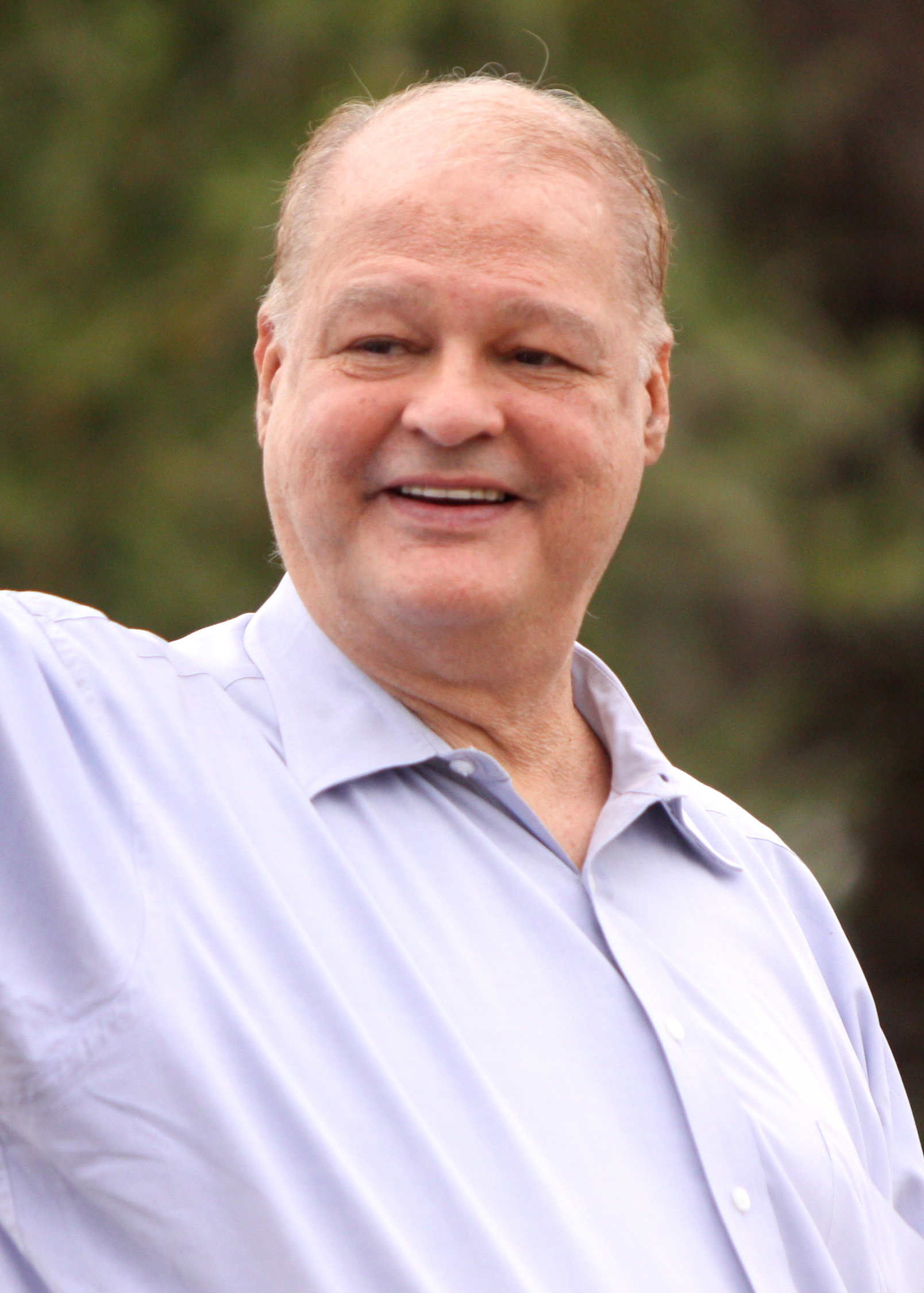

Nominee	Tom Horne	Felecia Rotellini
Party	Republican	Democratic
Popular vote	870,483	807,185
Percentage	51.89%	48.11%
- Horne: 50–60% 60–70% 70–80% 80–90% >90% Rotellini: 50–60% 60–70% 70–80% 80–90% >90% Tie: 50% No data
Attorney General before election
Terry Goddard
Democratic
Elected Attorney General
Tom Horne
Republican

Incumbent Democrat Terry Goddard ran for governor. The three Democrats who ran to fill the vacancy were Arizona's House minority leader David Lujan as well as Felecia Rotellini and Vince Rabago both former assistant attorney general. The Republican race was between superintendent of public instruction Tom Horne and former Maricopa County attorney Andrew Thomas.

In the Republican primary, Tom Horne declared victory on August 28, with an 853-vote lead. However, his opponent, Andrew Thomas, did not concede the race until August 31.

=== Democratic primary ===
==== Candidates ====
- Felecia Rotellini, former assistant attorney general.
- Vince Rabago, former assistant attorney general.
- David Lujan, minority leader at the Arizona House of Representatives.

==== Primary results ====
Democratic primary results
Party	Candidate	Votes	%
Democratic	Felecia Rotellini	120,364	41.49
Democratic	David Lujan	117,937	40.65
Democratic	Vince Rabago	51,813	17.86
Total votes		290,114	100

=== Republican primary ===
==== Candidates ====
- Tom Horne, incumbent Superintendent of Public Instruction.
- Andrew Thomas, former Maricopa County attorney.

==== Primary results ====
Primary results by county: Horne: 50–60%; Thomas: 50–60%

Republican primary results
Party	Candidate	Votes	%
Republican	Tom Horne	276,761	50.08
Republican	Andrew Thomas	275,862	49.92
Total votes		552,623	100

=== General election ===
==== Debate ====
2010 Arizona Attorney General election debate
No.	Date	Host	Moderator	Link	Republican	Democratic
Key: P Participant A Absent N Not invited I Invited W Withdrawn						
Key: P Participant A Absent N Not invited I Invited W Withdrawn					Tom Horne	Felecia Rotellini
1	September 8, 2010	KAET	Ted Simons	Arizona PBS	P	P

==== Endorsements ====
Tom Horne (R)

State executive officials

- Jan Brewer, Governor of Arizona (2009-2015).

County executive officials

- Joe Arpaio, Maricopa County Sheriff (1993-2017).

Organizations

- Can-Do Conservatives of America
- Phoenix Law Enforcement Association
- Southern Arizona Home Builders Association
Felecia Rotellini (D)

State executive officials

- Grant Woods, former Arizona Attorney General (1991-1999). (Republican)

State legislative officials

- Carolyn Allen, state senator. (Republican)

Labor unions

- Arizona AFL-CIO

Organizations

- Arizona Association of Realtors
- Arizona League of Conservation Voters
- Equality Arizona
- EMILYs List
- Planned Parenthood Arizona

Newspapers

- The Arizona Republic
- Arizona Daily Star
- East Valley Tribune
- Tucson Weekly

==== Polling ====
Poll source	Date(s) administered	Sample size	Margin of error	Tom Horne (R)	Felecia Rotellini (D)	Neither	Undecided
Moore Information	October 12–13, 2010	500 (LV)	± 4%	46%	37%	3%	14%
Wilson Research Strategies	October 5–6, 2010	400 (LV)	± 4.9%	53%	35%	–	12%
Behavior Research Center	October 1–10, 2010	450 (LV)	± 4.7%	40%	36%	–	24%
Behavior Research Center	October 1–10, 2010	555 (RV)	± 4.2%	34%	34%	–	32%

==== Results ====
2010 Arizona Attorney General election
Party	Candidate	Votes	%
Republican	Tom Horne	870,483	51.89
Democratic	Felecia Rotellini	807,185	48.11
Total votes		1,677,668	100
Republican gain from Democratic			

== Treasurer ==
2010 Arizona State Treasurer election
- November 2, 2010
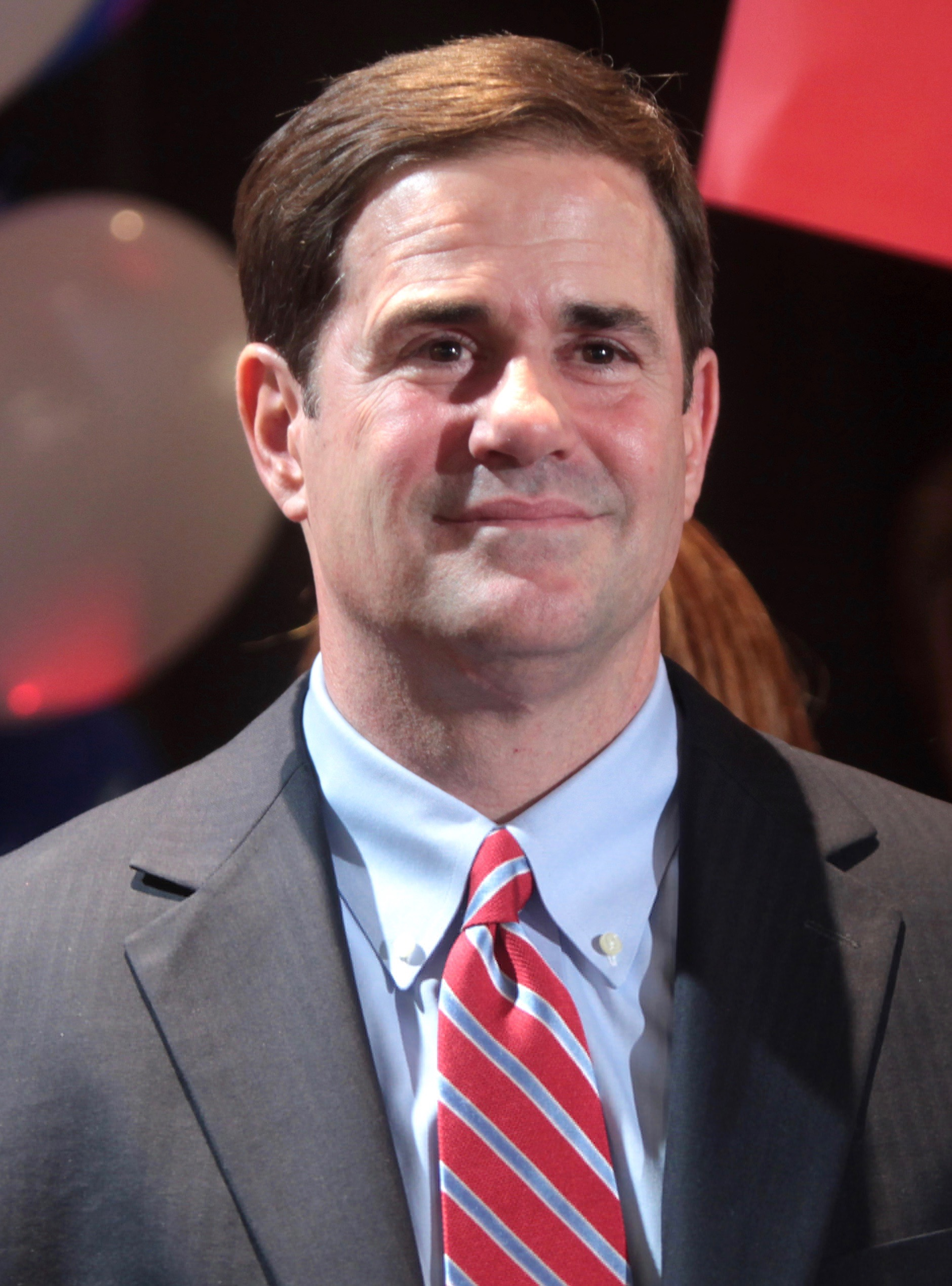

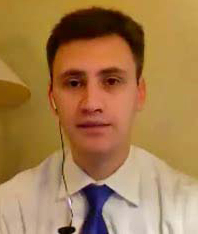
Nominee	Doug Ducey	Andrei Cherny
Party	Republican	Democratic
Popular vote	859,672	685,865
Percentage	51.86%	41.37%
- Ducey: 40–50% 50–60% 60–70% 70–80% 80–90% >90% Cherny: 40–50% 50–60% 60–70% 70–80% 80–90% >90% Tie: 40–50% 50% No data
State Treasurer before election
Dean Martin
Republican
Elected State Treasurer
Doug Ducey
Republican

As incumbent Republican Treasurer Dean Martin decided to unsuccessfully run for Governor of Arizona, the position was an open seat. CEO of Cold Stone Creamery and former investor Doug Ducey successfully ran for the Republican nomination. Andrei Cherny, an advisor to Barack Obama, Joe Biden, Al Gore, Hillary Clinton, and John Kerry, won the Democratic nomination.

=== Republican primary ===
==== Candidates ====
- Doug Ducey, businessman.
- Barbara Leff, state senator.
- Thayer Verschoor, state senator.
- Ted Carpenter, former state representative.

==== Primary results ====
Republican primary results
Party	Candidate	Votes	%
Republican	Doug Ducey	211,493	41.36
Republican	Barbara Leff	119,891	23.44
Republican	Thayer Verschoor	112,975	22.09
Republican	Ted Carpenter	67,026	13.11
Total votes		511,385	100

=== Democratic primary ===
==== Candidates ====
- Andrei Cherny, political advisor and writer.

==== Primary results ====
Democratic primary results
Party	Candidate	Votes	%
Democratic	Andrei Cherny	262,467	100
Total votes		262,467	100

=== Third party candidates ===
- Thane Eichenauer (Libertarian)
- Thomas Meadows (Green)

=== General election ===
==== Debate ====
2010 Arizona State Treasurer election debate
No.	Date	Host	Moderator	Link	Republican	Democratic	Libertarian	Green
Key: P Participant A Absent N Not invited I Invited W Withdrawn								
Key: P Participant A Absent N Not invited I Invited W Withdrawn					Doug Ducey	Andrei Cherny	Thane Eichenauer	Thomas Meadows
1	September 29, 2010	KAET	Ted Simons	Arizona PBS	P	P	P	A

==== Endorsements ====
Doug Ducey (R)

Organizations

- Arizona Chamber of Commerce and Industry
- Arizona Right to Life

Newspapers

- East Valley Tribune
Andrei Cherny (D)

Organizations

- Arizona League of Conservation Voters
- Equality Arizona
- Planned Parenthood Arizona

Labor unions

- Arizona AFL-CIO

Newspapers

- Tucson Weekly

==== Polling ====
Poll source	Date(s) administered	Sample size	Margin of error	Doug Ducey (R)	Andrei Cherny (D)	Thomas Meadows (G)	Thane Eichenauer (L)	None	Undecided
Moore Information	October 12–13, 2010	500 (LV)	± 4%	38%	24%	5%	4%	2%	28%

==== Results ====
2010 Arizona State Treasurer election
Party	Candidate	Votes	%
Republican	Doug Ducey	859,672	51.86
Democratic	Andrei Cherny	685,865	41.37
Libertarian	Thane Eichenauer	66,166	3.99
Green	Thomas Meadows	46,115	2.78
Total votes		1,657,818	100
Republican hold			

== Superintendent of Public Instruction ==
2010 Arizona Superintendent of Public Instruction election
- November 2, 2010

Nominee	John Huppenthal	Penny Kotterman
Party	Republican	Democratic
Popular vote	917,760	740,993
Percentage	55.33%	44.67%
- Huppenthal: 50–60% 60–70% Kotterman: 50–60% 60–70% 70–80%
Superintendent before election
Tom Horne
Republican
Elected Superintendent
John Huppenthal
Republican

Incumbent Republican Tom Horne was term-limited and successfully ran for Attorney General. State senator John Huppenthal and educator Penny Kotterman won the Republican and Democratic primaries respectively.

=== Republican primary ===
==== Candidates ====
- John Huppenthal, state senator.
- Margaret Dugan, deputy Superintendent of Public Instruction.
- Beth Price, educator.

==== Primary results ====
Republican primary results
Party	Candidate	Votes	%
Republican	John Huppenthal	304,605	58.74
Republican	Margaret Dugan	145,962	28.15
Republican	Beth Price	67,969	13.11
Total votes		518,536	100

=== Democratic primary ===
==== Candidates ====
- Penny Kotterman, educator and former Arizona Education Association president.
- Jason Williams, educator and Democratic nominee in 2006.

==== Primary results ====
Democratic primary results
Party	Candidate	Votes	%
Democratic	Penny Kotterman	190,701	66.40
Democratic	Jason Williams	96,519	33.60
Total votes		287,220	100

=== General election ===
==== Debate ====
2010 Arizona Superintendent of Public Instruction election debate
No.	Date	Host	Moderator	Link	Republican	Democratic
Key: P Participant A Absent N Not invited I Invited W Withdrawn						
Key: P Participant A Absent N Not invited I Invited W Withdrawn					John Huppenthal	Penny Kotterman
1	September 15, 2010	KAET	Ted Simons	Arizona PBS	P	P

==== Endorsements ====
John Huppenthal (R)

Organizations

- Arizona Chamber of Commerce and Industry
- Arizona Citizens Defense League
- Arizona 2010 Project
- Arizona Right to Life
Penny Kotterman (D)

Organizations

- Arizona League of Conservation Voters
- EMILYs List

Newspapers

- East Valley Tribune
- Tucson Weekly
- Arizona Daily Wildcat

==== Polling ====
Poll source	Date(s) administered	Sample size	Margin of error	John Huppenthal (R)	Penny Kotterman (D)	None	Undecided
Moore Information	October 12–13, 2010	500 (LV)	± 4%	46%	33%	2%	20%

==== Results ====
2010 Arizona Superintendent of Public Instruction election
Party	Candidate	Votes	%
Republican	John Huppenthal	917,760	55.33
Democratic	Penny Kotterman	740,993	44.67
Total votes		1,658,753	100
Republican hold			

== Mine Inspector ==
2010 Arizona State Mine Inspector election
- November 2, 2010
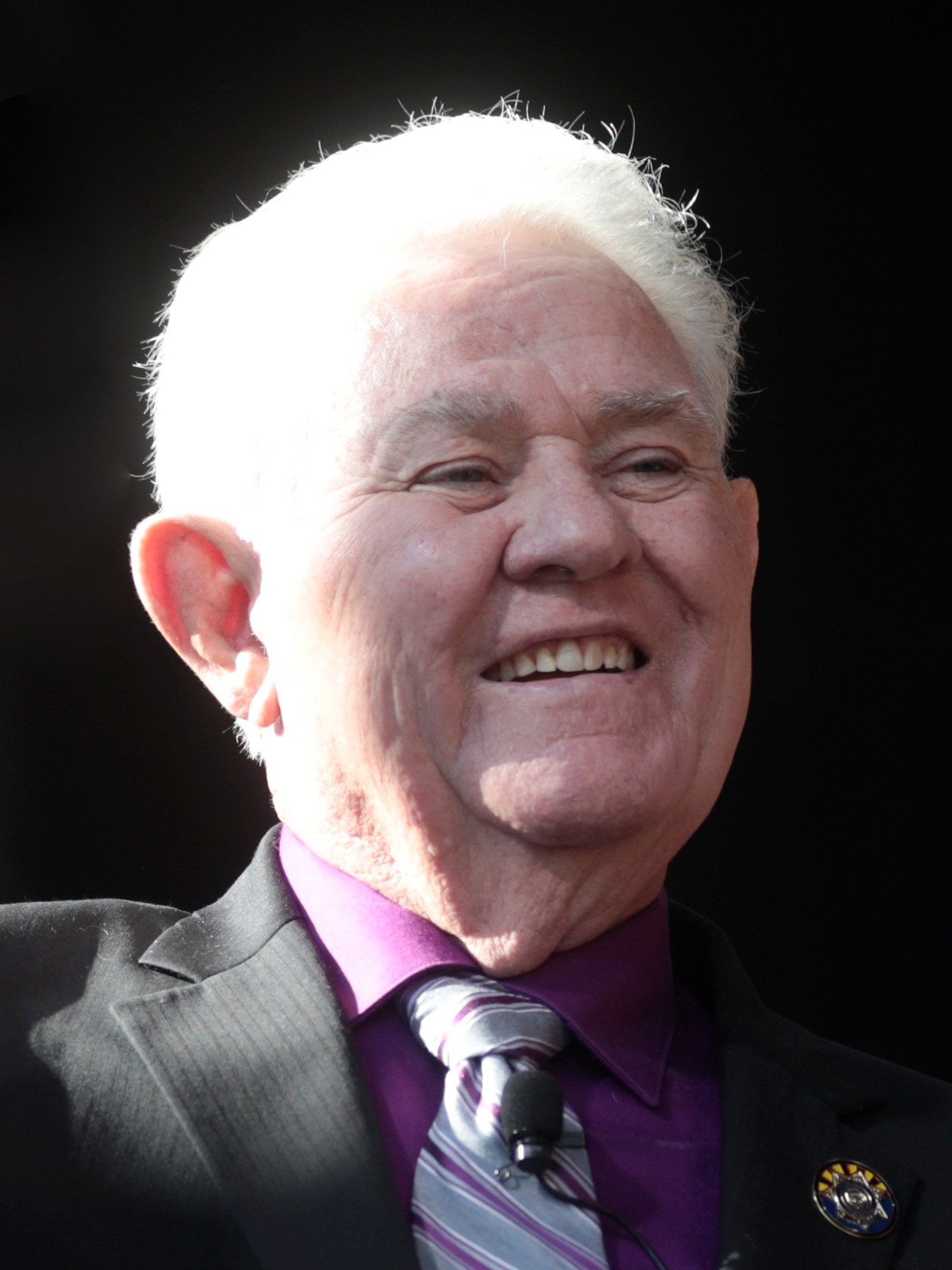

Nominee	Joe Hart	Manuel Cruz
Party	Republican	Democratic
Popular vote	916,046	687,310
Percentage	57.13%	42.87%
- County results Hart: 50–60% 60–70% 70–80% Cruz: 50–60% 60–70%
Inspector before election
Joe Hart
Republican
Elected Inspector
Joe Hart
Republican

Incumbent Republican Joe Hart ran for a second term and was challenged by Democrat Manuel Cruz. Arizona is the only state that fills this position through direct election.

=== Republican primary ===
==== Candidates ====
- Joe Hart, incumbent.

==== Primary results ====
Republican primary results
Party	Candidate	Votes	%
Republican	Joe Hart (incumbent)	459,844	100
Total votes		459,844	100

=== Democratic primary ===
==== Candidates ====
- Manuel Cruz, blasting engineer.

==== Primary results ====
Democratic primary results
Party	Candidate	Votes	%
Democratic	Manuel Cruz	261,339	100
Total votes		261,339	100

=== General election ===
==== Debate ====
2010 Arizona State Mine Inspector election debate
No.	Date	Host	Moderator	Link	Republican	Democratic
Key: P Participant A Absent N Not invited I Invited W Withdrawn						
Key: P Participant A Absent N Not invited I Invited W Withdrawn					Joe Hart	Manuel Cruz
1	October 6, 2010	KAET	Ted Simons	Arizona PBS	P	P

==== Endorsements ====
Joe Hart (R)

Organizations

- Arizona Chamber of Commerce and Industry
- Arizona Right to Life
Manuel Cruz (D)

Labor unions

- Arizona AFL-CIO
- Arizona AFSCME

==== Polling ====
Poll source	Date(s) administered	Sample size	Margin of error	Joe Hart (R)	Manuel Cruz (D)	None	Undecided
Moore Information	October 12–13, 2010	500 (LV)	± 4%	38%	29%	3%	30%

==== Results ====
2010 Arizona State Mine Inspector election
Party	Candidate	Votes	%
Republican	Joe Hart (incumbent)	916,046	57.13
Democratic	Manuel Cruz	687,310	42.87
Total votes		1,603,356	100
Republican hold			

== Corporation Commission ==
2010 Arizona Corporation Commission election
- November 2, 2010

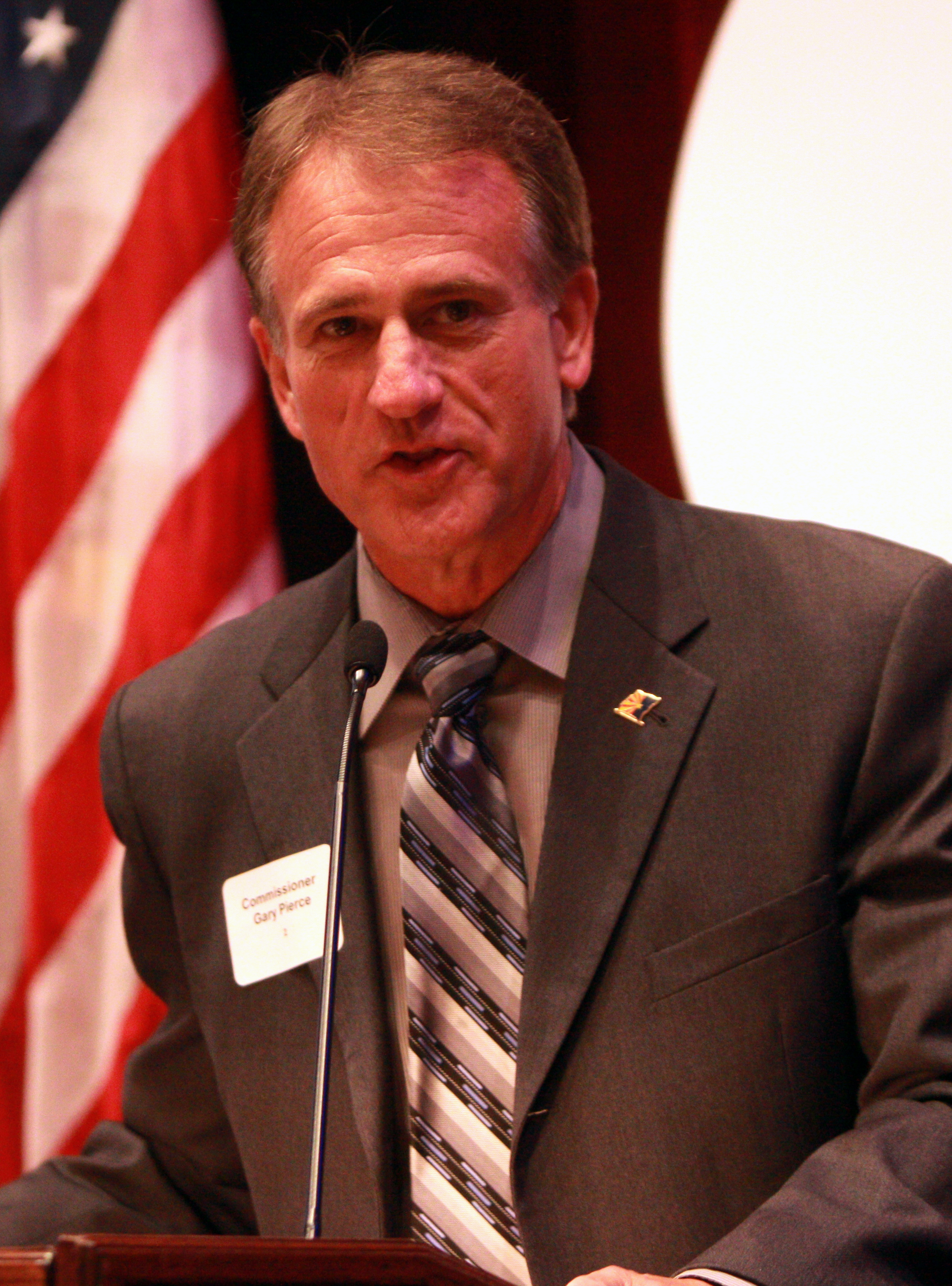

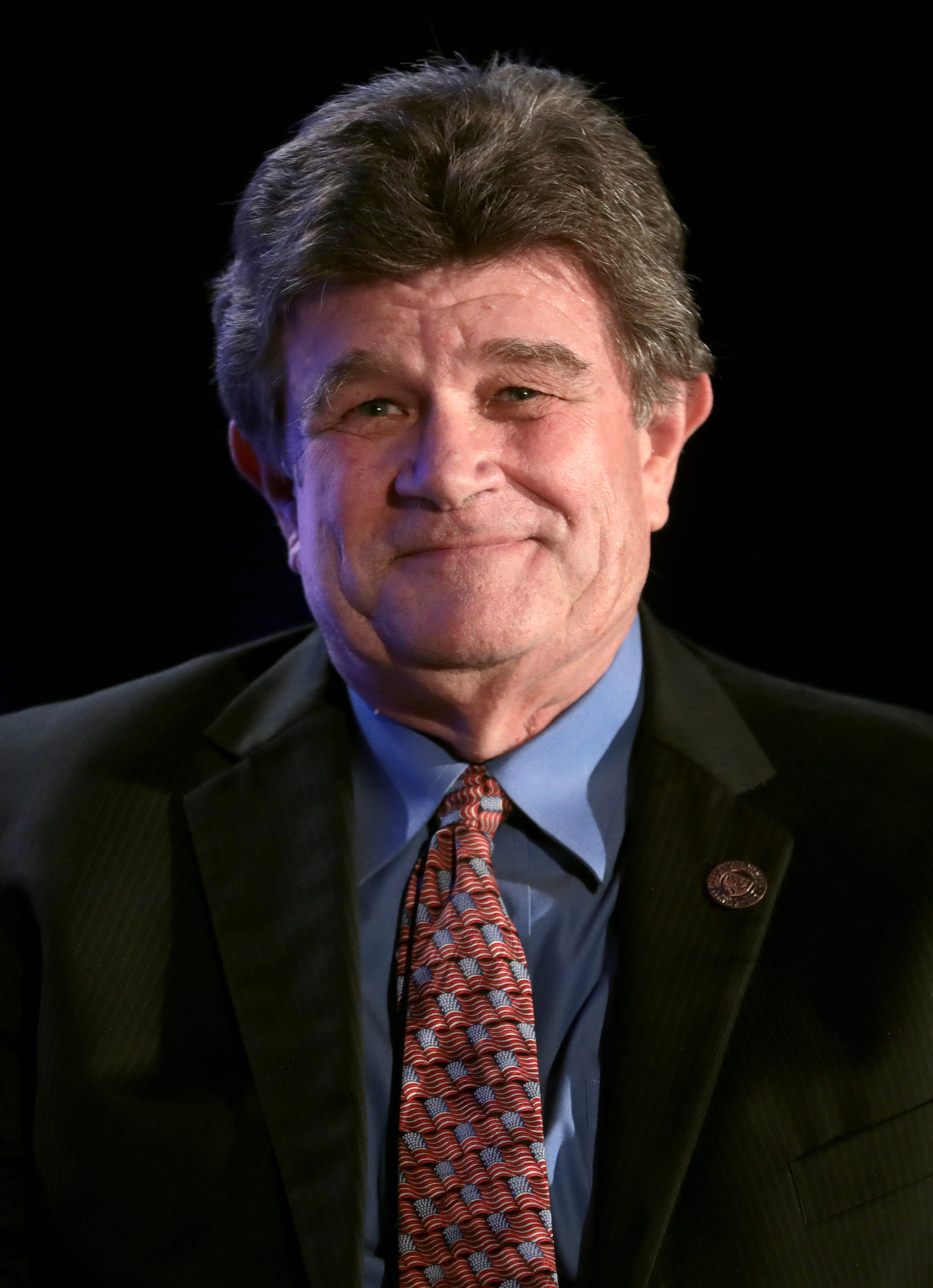

Nominee	Brenda Burns	Gary Pierce
Party	Republican	Republican
Popular vote	862,546	833,541
Percentage	29.09%	28.11%
Nominee	David Bradley	Jorge Luis Garcia (deceased)
Party	Democratic	Democratic
Popular vote	563,645	519,926
Percentage	19.01%	17.53%
Commissioners before election
Kris Mayes (R)
Gary Pierce (R)
Elected Commissioners
Brenda Burns (R)
Gary Pierce (R)

Two seats on the Arizona Corporation Commission were up for election. Incumbent commissioner Gary Pierce ran for re-election while Kris Mayes was term limited. Brenda Burns became the second Republican to secure nomination. They were challenged by Democrats David Bradley and Jorge Luis Garcia. Garcia died on October 15 but his name remained on the ballot.

=== Republican primary ===
==== Candidates ====
- Gary Pierce, incumbent commissioner.
- Brenda Burns, former state senator.
- Barry Wong, attorney and former state representative.

==== Primary results ====
Republican primary results
Party	Candidate	Votes	%
Republican	Gary Pierce (incumbent)	323,751	39.72
Republican	Brenda Burns	300,698	36.90
Republican	Barry Wong	190,576	23.38
Total votes		815,025	100

=== Democratic primary ===
==== Candidates ====
- David Bradley, state representative.
- Jorge Luis Garcia, state senator.
- Renz Jennings, former commissioner (1985-1999).

==== Primary results ====
Democratic primary results
Party	Candidate	Votes	%
Democratic	David Bradley	142,859	34.44
Democratic	Jorge Luis Garcia	139,191	33.57
Democratic	Renz Jennings	132,638	31.99
Total votes		414,688	100

=== Third party candidates ===
- Rick Fowlkes (Libertarian)
- Theodore Gomez (Green)
- Benjamin Pearcy (Green) (withdrew, remained on the ballot)

=== General election ===
==== Debate ====
2010 Arizona Corporation Commission election debate
Date			Host		Moderator	
October 4, 2010			Arizona PBS		Ted Simons	
Key: P Participant A Absent N Not invited I Invited W Withdrawn
Republican		Democratic		Libertarian	Green	
Gary Pierce	Brenda Burns	David Bradley	Jorge Luis Garcia	Rick Fowlkes	Theodore Gomez	Benjamin Pearcy
P	P	P	P	P	A	A
Link: Arizona PBS

==== Endorsements ====
Gary Pierce (R)

Organizations

- Arizona Association of Realtors
- Arizona Chamber of Commerce and Industry
- Arizona Citizens Defense League
- Arizona 2010 Project
- Arizona Right to Life
Brenda Burns (R)

Organizations

- Arizona Association of Realtors
- Arizona Chamber of Commerce and Industry
- Arizona Citizens Defense League
- Arizona 2010 Project
- Arizona Right to Life
David Bradley (D)

Organizations

- Arizona League of Conservation Voters

Newspapers

- Tucson Weekly

==== Polling ====
Poll source	Date(s) administered	Sample size	Margin of error	Gary Pierce (R)	Brenda Burns (R)	David Bradley (D)	Jorge Luis Garcia (D)	Theodore Gomez (G)	Rick Fowlkes (L)	None	Undecided
Moore Information (Note: People were asked to pick two candidates of their choice.)	October 12–13, 2010	500 (LV)	± 4%	28%	28%	18%	17%	4%	4%	3%	33%

==== Results ====
2010 Arizona Corporation Commission election
Party	Candidate	Votes	%
Republican	Brenda Burns	862,546	29.09
Republican	Gary Pierce (incumbent)	833,541	28.11
Democratic	David Bradley	563,645	19.01
Democratic	Jorge Luis Garcia (Note: Garcia died on October 15 but remained on the ballot as it was too late to remove his name.)	519,926	17.53
Libertarian	Rick Fowlkes	95,771	3.23
Green	Benjamin Pearcy (withdrawn)	47,121	1.59
Green	Theodore Gomez	42,645	1.44
Total votes		2,965,195	100
Republican hold			
Republican hold			

== State Legislature ==
All 30 members of the Arizona Senate and all 60 members of the Arizona House of Representatives were up for election. Republicans flipped multiple seats in both chambers.

=== State Senate ===
Party	Before	After	Change
Republican	18	21	▲3
Democratic	12	9	▼3
Total	30	30	

=== House of Representatives ===
Party	Before	After	Change
Republican	35	40	▲5
Democratic	25	20	▼5
Total	60	60	

== Supreme Court ==
Results by county Yes: 60–70%; 70–80%; 80–90%

One justice on the Arizona Supreme Court was up for retention in 2010. Justice Rebecca White Berch was appointed to the Supreme Court by Governor Jane Dee Hull in 2002 and became Chief Justice in 2009.

Justice Berch retention, 2010
Choice	Votes	%
For	901,333	75.20
Against	297,288	24.80
Total	1,198,621	100.00
Source: Arizona Secretary of State

== Ballot propositions ==
Arizona had eleven statewide propositions on the ballot in 2010 - one special election in May and ten in the November general ballot.

=== May special election ===
Results by county Yes: 70–80%; 60–70%; 50–60%; No: 50–60%

On May 18, 2010, a special election was held for an amendment seeking a temporary sales tax increase. It was passed by an almost two-thirds margin.

Proposition 100
Choice	Votes	%
For	750,850	64.32
Against	416,571	35.68
Total	1,167,421	100.00
Source: Arizona Secretary of State

=== November general election ===
2010 Arizona ballot propositions (November)
No.	Description	Votes				Type
No.	Description	Yes	%	No	%	Type
106	Prohibits mandating participation in any health care system and also prohibits fines for not participating.	892,693	55.28	722,300	44.72	Legislatively referred constitutional amendment
107	Prohibits preferential treatment to or discrimination against any person/group on the basis of race, sex, color, ethnicity, or national origin in employment.	952,086	59.51	647,713	40.49	Legislatively referred constitutional amendment
109	Provides a constitutional right to hunt, fish, and harvest wildlife in Arizona.	714,144	43.52	926,991	56.48	Legislatively referred constitutional amendment
110	Authorizes the sale or lease of state lands without public auction in order to protect military operations.	792,394	49.71	801,670	50.29	Legislatively referred constitutional amendment
111	Renames the position of Secretary of State to Lieutenant Governor.	655,252	40.77	951,820	59.23	Legislatively referred constitutional amendment
112	Changes the initiative filing deadline from four months to six months before the general election.	792,697	49.99	792,825	50.01	Legislatively referred constitutional amendment
113	Provides the right to vote on a secret ballot in regard to employee representation.	978,109	60.46	639,692	39.54	Legislatively referred constitutional amendment
203	Protects terminally or seriously ill patients from state prosecution for using limited amounts of marijuana on doctor's recommendation.	841,348	50.13	837,008	49.87	Citizen-initiated state statute
301	Transfers remaining money from a land-conservation fund to the general fund.	416,323	25.99	1,185,461	74.01	Legislatively referred state statute
302	Terminates the Arizona Early Childhood Development and Health Board and associated programs.	492,060	30.10	1,142,744	69.90	Legislatively referred state statute
Source: Arizona Secretary of State

Results by county

Proposition 106 results by county
Yes:
- 60–70%
- 50–60%
No:
- 50–60%

Proposition 107 results by county
Yes:
- 60–70%
- 50–60%
No:
- 50–60%

Proposition 109 results by county
Yes:
- 60–70%
- 50–60%
No:
- 60–70%
- 50–60%

Proposition 110 results by county
Yes:
- 50–60%
No:
- 60–70%
- 50–60%

Proposition 111 results by county
No:
- 70–80%
- 60–70%
- 50–60%

Proposition 112 results by county
Yes:
- 50–60%
No:
- 50–60%

Proposition 113 results by county
Yes:
- 60–70%
- 50–60%
No:
- 50–60%

Proposition 203 results by county
Yes:
- 50–60%
No:
- 60–70%
- 50–60%

Proposition 301 results by county
No:
- 70–80%
- 60–70%

Proposition 302 results by county
No:
- 70–80%
- 60–70%
