= Arizona Department of Gaming =

Department overview
- Formed: 1995
- Jurisdiction: State of Arizona
- Headquarters: 1110 West Washington Street, Suite 450; Phoenix, Arizona
- Department executive: Ted Vogt, Director
- Website: gaming.az.gov

Map

The Arizona Department of Gaming (ADG) is a gaming control board in Arizona that provides oversight of the state's gaming industry.

== History ==
The Arizona Department of Gaming was established by the Arizona State Legislature in 1995 to regulate the state's growing gaming industry.

In 2015, the legislature consolidated the Department of Racing under the Department of Gaming.

== Activities ==
The Arizona Department of Gaming regulates the state's Native American gaming operations, pari-mutuel racing and wagering, as well as boxing and mixed arts. It enforces the state's laws prohibiting illegal and unauthorized gaming, and works with police enforcement to investigate violations. The department also operates the Arizona Office of Problem Gambling (OPG), which provides and supports the treatment and prevention of problem gambling.

The state's Native American gaming operations are governed by the Tribal-State Gaming Compacts. The department partners with the state's 21 Native American tribes with gaming compacts to oversee their casinos. Currently there are sixteen tribes operating 23 casinos in Arizona. The other five tribes do not have casinos, but have slot machine rights they may lease to other tribes.

== Funding ==
The Arizona Department of Gaming does not receive any tax revenue or general government funds to support its regulatory responsibilities, despite being a state government agency. Its Native American gaming operations oversight is funded by the 21 tribes with gaming compacts, as set forth in their compacts. Regulation of racing activities is funded by the Racing Regulation Fund, which is primarily composed of revenues from regulatory wagering assessments.

== See also ==
- List of casinos in Arizona
