= State Bar of Arizona =

State bar association of Arizona

- Type: Legal Society
- Headquarters: Phoenix and Tucson, AZ
- Location: United States
- Members: 18,500 (2022)
- Key people: Jessica Sanchez (President)
- Website: Official website

The State Bar of Arizona is the integrated (mandatory) bar association of the U.S. state of Arizona. The Arizona Supreme Court licenses lawyers, while the State Bar administers the regulation of the practice of law. The State Bar, under the direction of the Court, establishes procedures for the discipline of lawyer misconduct and provides education and development programs for the legal profession and the public. Through the Rules of The Supreme Court of Arizona, the privilege to practice law in Arizona is granted solely to "active member[s] of the state bar."

It is governed by a 30-member Board of Governors: four non-attorney, public members appointed by the Board; three at-large members appointed by the Arizona Supreme Court, 19 attorney members elected by fellow Bar members in their districts; and four ex officio members (immediate past president and the deans of Arizona's three law schools.)

The Bar is a private/non-profit funded through membership dues and service fees; it is not a state agency and receives no taxpayer funding.

The State Bar was organized to advance the administration of justice, provide for the regulation and discipline of persons engaged in the practice of law; foster integrity, learning, competence, and public service within the legal profession. As of the 2025 State Bar of Arizona Annual Report published in 2026, the active membership includes 20,192 lawyers, both in-state and out-of-state. Total membership (including categories for inactive, judicial, retired and others) is 26,877. 2025 State Bar of Arizona Annual Report

Consumers look to the State Bar as a resource of information about the legal system, including how to find and hire a lawyer, alternatives to trial, and how to handle a dispute with a lawyer. All of these topics can be found on the Bar's website at www.azbar.org or through free brochures (published by the Bar) available at local libraries and at the State Bar offices in Phoenix and Tucson.

Lawyers on Call is a public service program sponsored by the State Bar of Arizona and Phoenix's 12 News KPNX TV. Members of the public can have their legal questions answered by volunteer lawyers. The Bar also partners with Univision to provide a similar service for the Spanish-speaking community.

The State Bar promotes the work of its sister organization, the Arizona Foundation for Legal Services & Education, also known as the Arizona Bar Foundation. The Foundation supports pro bono volunteer work by Arizona lawyers, including the "Wills for Heroes" program, which provides free wills to first responders. Other programs of the Foundation include Kids Voting, Project Citizen, AZLawHelp.org, We the People, LawforVeterans.org, LawforSeniors.org, and LawforKids.org.

Lawyer Regulation In addition to providing member services, the State Bar acts in the capacity of a consumer protection agency. The "Find a Lawyer" tool on www.azbar.org includes the name of anyone ever admitted to the State Bar, along with their current status and a record of their discipline history, if any. There are detailed explanations of disciplinary sanctions on the website, along with a complete description of the disciplinary system.

In 2010 the lawyer regulation process was reviewed by The State Bar of Arizona, the Arizona Supreme Court and respondents' counsel representatives. A streamlined system, launched in January, 2011, has resulted in marked improvements in resolution at the Intake stage. The vast majority of charges against lawyers, which might include such things as failing to return calls promptly, can be quickly resolved with a call or letter to the lawyer. These minor charges do not require full investigation. Instead, the resources of the State Bar can be devoted to more serious charges which can take months to investigate.

To protect lawyers from frivolous complaints, the Rules of The Supreme Court of Arizona allow the Bar to:

1. dismiss minor complaints (about lawyers) without formal proceedings; and
2. expunge public record of dismissed complaints after six months.

Serious ethical violations may result in a variety of sanctions or diversion, with disbarment being the most severe form of sanction. The State Bar publishes these sanctions on its website and notifies media outlets in the sanctioned lawyer's jurisdiction.

The entire lawyer regulation process is monitored by the Attorney Regulation Advisory Committee of the Arizona Supreme Court.

Professional Development The State Bar of Arizona provides a variety of professional development opportunities for its members, ranging from the Bar Leadership Institute, Arizona College of Trial Advocacy, 28 practice area sections, Law Office Management Assistance, Mentor Program, and Young Lawyers Division.

== History ==
The first Arizona-wide bar association was created in 1895. In 1902, it led the rewriting of a civil code for the Territory and in 1904 strongly promoted the admission of Arizona as a state into the Union. In 1906 the Arizona Bar Association was first incorporated. In 1912 it adopted the ethical rules of the American Bar Association and began official admission procedures for law practice.

James M. Murphy, the 24th president of the State Bar of Arizona, recounted the founding of the Bar in a 1960 article for the Arizona Law Review:

"On the Glorious Feast of St. Patrick in the year 1933, the State Bar of Arizona was created as an integrated legal entity. By act of the Legislature the State Bar became a semi-public body, and membership in it was required for anyone who might practice law in Arizona."

The first organizational meeting of the State Bar was held in the Supreme Court Room in Phoenix on September 15, 1933. At that time there were about 600 lawyers in Arizona, exclusive of judges.

In 1948 the Bar established its first central office in Phoenix. The first Executive Director was hired in 1954. In 1955 the Board authorized the creation of sections in the State Bar organization for the benefit of members with a special interest in particular areas of the law.

In April 1961, the Bar published the first Bar Journal, an anthology of featured articles from 1940 to date. This publication has since evolved into Arizona Attorney magazine, which is published 11 times annually and has been nationally recognized as the premier large-bar publication in the country.

In 1988 the Bar opened a satellite office in Tucson, serving lawyers in Pima, Santa Cruz and Cochise Counties. Mandatory Continuing Legal Education requirements were adopted in 1991.

The 21st century ushered in a number of changes at the State Bar, including an electronic newsletter, eLegal, sent bimonthly to all members. The Bar purchased and moved into new headquarters in Phoenix and purchased a building for the Southern Regional Office in Tucson.

In 2012, the Bar's total membership rose to more than 22,000, which includes out-of-state members.

=== State Bar of Arizona historical timeline ===
- 1933 – The State Bar Act created the State Bar of Arizona as an integrated or "mandatory membership" organization to serve the legal profession and the public.
- 1936 – Joseph C. Padilla becomes the first Hispanic lawyer in Arizona.
- 1948 – Hayzel Burton Daniels is the first African American to graduate from the University of Arizona Law School and be admitted to the State Bar of Arizona.
- 1950 – The Arizona Supreme Court upheld the constitutionality of the State Bar Act.
- 1951 – Lorna Lockwood becomes the first woman Superior Court judge in Arizona.
- 1952 – Mary Anne Richey becomes the first Deputy County Attorney in Pima County and goes on to become the first woman United States Attorney in the District of Arizona and Arizona's first woman federal judge.
- 1953 – (Judge) Lawrence Huerta becomes the first Native American admitted to the State Bar of Arizona.
- 1961 – Lorna Lockwood becomes the first woman Arizona Supreme Court Justice and goes on to become the first woman in the United States to be Chief Justice of a State Supreme Court.
- 1962 – The Arizona Bar Journal debuted.
- 1965 – Hayzel B. Daniels became the first African American judge in Arizona state history. His appointment became a national news story.
- 1966 – In a landmark ruling the United States Supreme Court overturns the conviction of Arizonan Ernesto Miranda, ruling that his confession was not voluntarily given because he was not warned of this right to remain silent. Those warnings later become a cornerstone of criminal defense rights. Phoenix attorneys John P. Frank and John J. Flynn represent Miranda.
- 1971 – President Richard Nixon nominates William H. Rehnquist, who practiced law in Phoenix from 1953 to 1969, to the United States Supreme Court. Rehnquist became Chief Justice in 1976.
- 1973 – Arizona Supreme Court adopts Rule 31, affirming its jurisdiction over the practice of law.
- 1977 – President Jimmy Carter appoints Phoenix attorney Thomas Tang as the first Asian and Chinese American judge on the United States Court of Appeals for the Ninth Circuit
- 1979 – President Jimmy Carter appoints Maricopa County Superior Court Judge Valdemar Aguirre Cordova as the first Mexican American federal judge in the U.S. District of Arizona.
- 1980 – Cecil B. Patterson, Jr. becomes the first black judge appointed to the Maricopa County Superior Court. In September 1995 he became the first black judge appointed to the Arizona Court of Appeals, Division One.
- 1981 – President Ronald Reagan nominates Arizona Court of Appeals Judge Sandra Day O'Connor to be the first woman justice to sit on the United States Supreme Court.
- 1983 – Arizona Legislature "sunsets" the State Bar.
- 1991 – Roxana C. Bacon becomes the first woman president of the State Bar of Arizona.
- 2002 – In response to the Rodeo-Chediski wildfire in central Arizona, the State Bar coordinates a program in which volunteer attorneys provide free legal assistance for people directly affected by the fire.
- 2012 – In conjunction with Univision, the Bar launches "Abodagos a su Lado", a phone bank operated by volunteer lawyers to answer consumer legal questions for the Hispanic community.
- 2016 – Lisa Loo becomes the first Asian-American president of the State Bar of Arizona.
