= 1994 Arizona House of Representatives election =

- November 8, 1994

All 60 seats in the Arizona House 31 seats needed for a majority
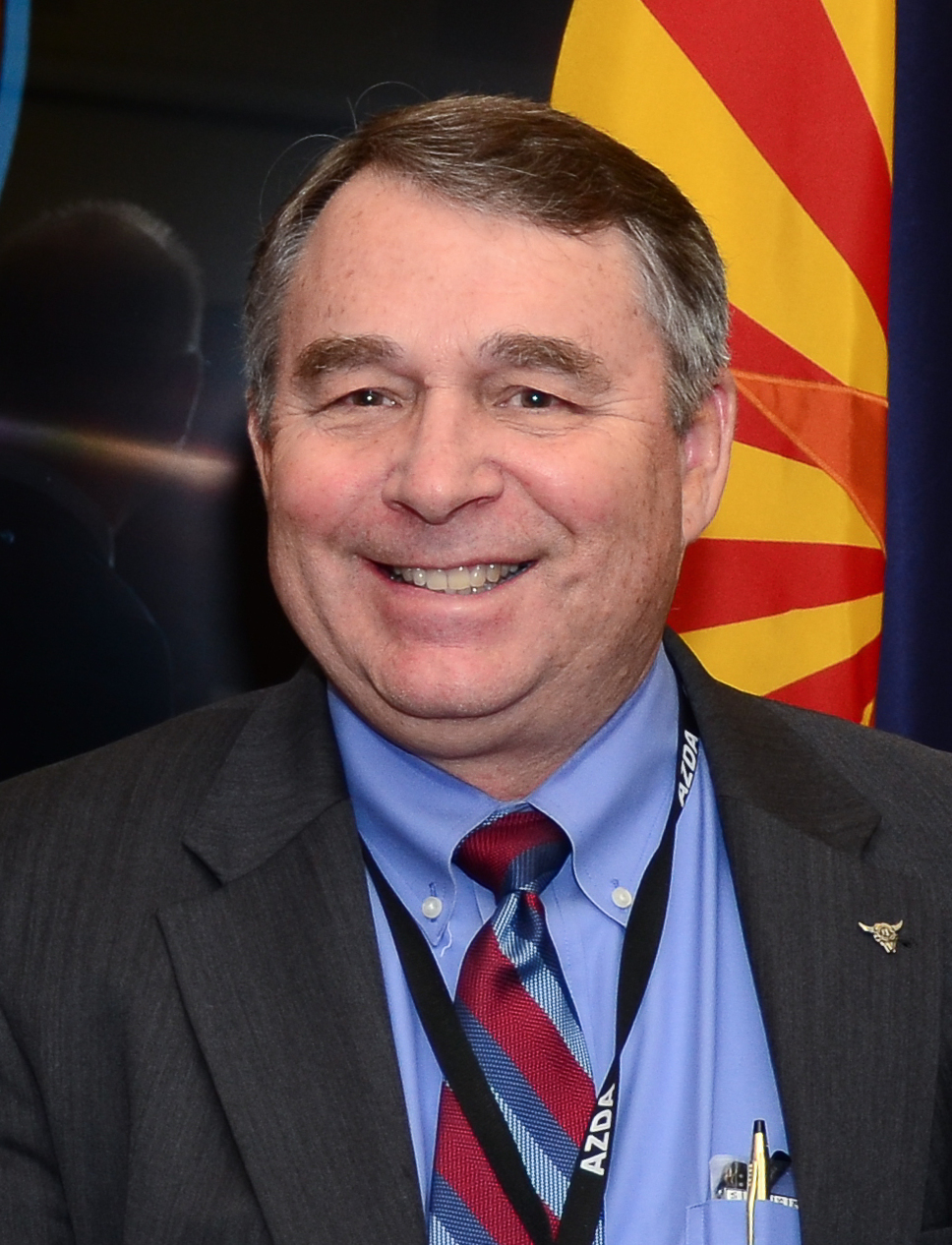

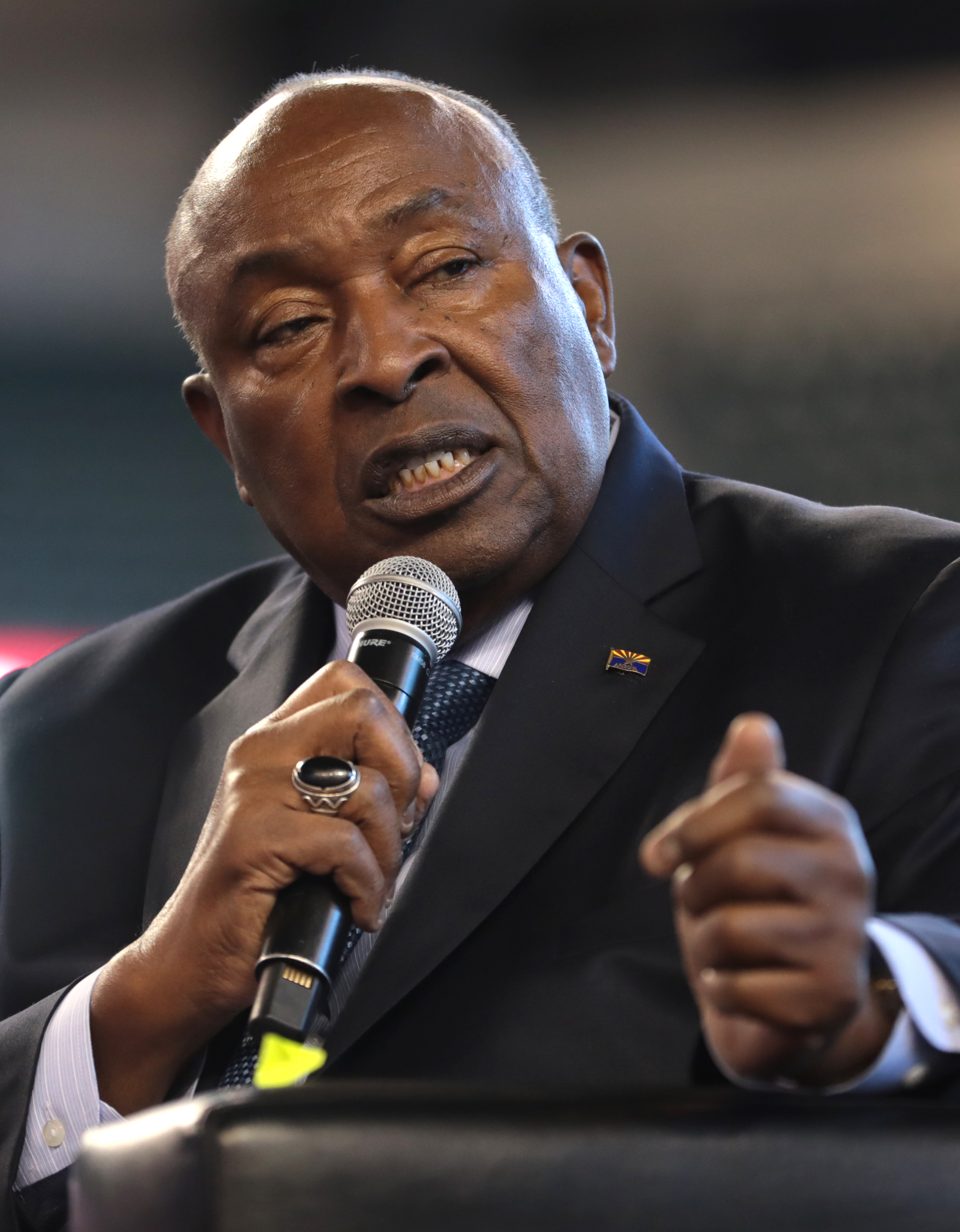
	Majority party	Minority party
Leader	Mark W. Killian	Art Hamilton
Party	Republican	Democratic
Leader's seat	30th - Mesa	22nd - Phoenix
Last election	35	25
Seats after	38	22
Seat change	▲3	▼3
- Results: Republican gain Republican hold Democratic hold
Speaker before election
Mark W. Killian
Republican
Elected Speaker
Mark W. Killian
Republican

The 1994 Arizona House of Representatives election took place on Tuesday, November 8, 1994, with the primary election held on Tuesday, September 13, 1994. Arizona voters elected all 60 members of the Arizona House of Representatives in multi-member districts to serve two-year terms.

The election coincided with United States national elections and Arizona state elections, including U.S. Senate, U.S. House, Governor, and Arizona Senate.

Following the previous election in 1992, Republicans held a 35-to-25-seat majority over Democrats. Republicans expanded their majority in 1994, winning 38 seats. At 22 members, Democrats saw a net loss of three seats. The newly elected members served in the 42nd Arizona State Legislature, during which Republican Mark W. Killian was re-elected as Speaker of the Arizona House. (Note: Killian was re-elected as Speaker for the 42nd legislature, defeating Democratic Leader Representative Art Hamilton, who was also nominated for Speaker. The vote tally for Speaker was: Killian-38 votes to Hamilton-22 votes.)

== Retiring incumbents ==
=== Democrats ===
1. District 7: Robert "Bob" Chastain (Note: Elected to the Arizona State Senate.)
2. District 14: Ruth Solomon (Note: Elected to the Arizona State Senate.)
3. District 20: Debbie McCune-Davis (Note: Ran for Corporation Commissioner; lost to Carl J. Kunasek.)
4. District 20: Linda D. Beezley
5. District 25: Chris Cummiskey (Note: Elected to the Arizona State Senate.)
6. District 25: Cathy Eden

=== Republicans ===
1. District 16: John Kaites (Note: Elected to the Arizona State Senate.)
2. District 17: Brenda Burns (Note: Elected to the Arizona State Senate.)
3. District 19: John C. Keegan
4. District 21: Leslie Whiting Johnson
5. District 26: Greg Patterson (Note: Ran for Corporation Commissioner; lost to Carl J. Kunasek in the Republican primary.)
6. District 27: Gary Richardson (Note: Elected to the Arizona State Senate.)
7. District 27: Bob Edens
8. District 28: David Schweikert (Note: Ran for U.S. House in Arizona's 6th congressional district; lost to J.D. Hayworth in the Republican primary.)
9. District 28: Lisa Graham (Note: Elected as Arizona Superintendent of Public Instruction.)
10. District 29: Lela Steffey
11. District 29: Pat Blake

== Incumbent defeated in primary election ==
=== Republican ===
1. District 6: Richard Kyle

== Incumbent defeated in general election ==
=== Democrat ===
1. District 4: E. C. "Polly" Rosenbaum

== Summary of results by legislative district ==
Italics denote an open seat held by the incumbent party; bold text denotes a gain for a party.

District	Incumbent	Party	Elected Representative	Outcome
1st	Don Aldridge	Rep	Don Aldridge	Rep Hold
1st	Sue Lynch	Rep	Sue Lynch	Rep Hold
2nd	Joe Hart	Rep	Joe Hart	Rep Hold
2nd	John Verkamp	Rep	John Verkamp	Rep Hold
3rd	Benjamin Hanley	Dem	Benjamin Hanley	Dem Hold
3rd	Jack C. Jackson	Dem	Jack C. Jackson	Dem Hold
4th	Jack A. Brown	Dem	Jack A. Brown	Dem Hold
4th	E. C. "Polly" Rosenbaum	Dem	**David C. Farnsworth**	**Rep Gain**
5th	Robert J. "Bob" McLendon	Dem	Robert J. "Bob" McLendon	Dem Hold
5th	Pat Conner	Rep	Pat Conner	Rep Hold
6th	Lori S. Daniels	Rep	Lori S. Daniels	Rep Hold
6th	Richard Kyle	Rep	Fulton Brock	Rep Hold
7th	Harry R. Clark	Dem	Harry R. Clark	Dem Hold
7th	Robert "Bob" Chastain	Dem	Rebecca Rios	Dem Hold
8th	Ruben F. Ortega	Dem	Ruben F. Ortega	Dem Hold
8th	Paul Newman	Dem	Paul Newman	Dem Hold
9th	Bill McGibbon	Rep	Bill McGibbon	Rep Hold
9th	Lou-Ann M. Preble	Rep	Lou-Ann M. Preble	Rep Hold
10th	Carmen Cajero	Dem	Carmen Cajero	Dem Hold
10th	Phillip Hubbard	Dem	Phillip Hubbard	Dem Hold
11th	Elaine Richardson	Dem	Elaine Richardson	Dem Hold
11th	Jorge Luis Garcia	Dem	Jorge Luis Garcia	Dem Hold
12th	Dan Schottel	Rep	Dan Schottel	Rep Hold
12th	Winifred "Freddy" Hershberger	Rep	Winifred "Freddy" Hershberger	Rep Hold
13th	Andy Nichols	Dem	Andy Nichols	Dem Hold
13th	George Cunningham	Dem	George Cunningham	Dem Hold
14th	Herschella Horton	Dem	Herschella Horton	Dem Hold
14th	Ruth Solomon	Dem	Marion L. Pickens	Dem Hold
15th	Ned King	Rep	Ned King	Rep Hold
15th	Jerry Overton	Rep	Jerry Overton	Rep Hold
16th	Becky Jordan	Rep	Becky Jordan	Rep Hold
16th	John Kaites	Rep	Jim Weiers	Rep Hold
17th	Robert "Bob" Burns	Rep	Robert "Bob" Burns	Rep Hold
17th	Brenda Burns	Rep	Jean McGrath	Rep Hold
18th	Barry Wong (Note: Republican Barry Wong was appointed by Maricopa County Board of Supervisors on Oct. 8, 1993 to fill unexpired term of Jane Dee Hull, who resigned on Oct. 4, 1993. Wong was sworn in as State Representative of District 18 on Oct. 14, 1993.)	Rep	Barry Wong	Rep Hold
18th	Susan Gerard	Rep	Susan Gerard	Rep Hold
19th	David L. Eberhart (Note: Republican David L. Eberhart was appointed by Maricopa County Board of Supervisors on April 19, 1993 to fill unexpired term of Nancy K. Wessel, who resigned on April 12, 1993. Eberhart was sworn in as State Representative of District 19 on April 20, 1993.)	Rep	David L. Eberhart	Rep Hold
19th	John C. Keegan	Rep	Scott Bundgaard	Rep Hold
20th	Debbie McCune-Davis	Dem	Kathi Foster	Dem Hold
20th	Linda D. Beezley	Dem	**Robert Blendu**	**Rep Gain**
21st	Russell "Rusty" Bowers	Rep	Russell "Rusty" Bowers	Rep Hold
21st	Leslie Whiting Johnson	Rep	Marilyn Jarrett	Rep Hold
22nd	Art Hamilton	Dem	Art Hamilton	Dem Hold
22nd	Joe Eddie Lopez	Dem	Joe Eddie Lopez	Dem Hold
23rd	Linda G. Aguirre	Dem	Linda G. Aguirre	Dem Hold
23rd	David Armstead	Dem	David Armstead	Dem Hold
24th	Sue Grace	Rep	Sue Grace	Rep Hold
24th	Ernie Baird	Rep	Ernie Baird	Rep Hold
25th	Chris Cummiskey	Dem	Ken Cheuvront	Dem Hold
25th	Cathy Eden	Dem	**Robert Updike**	**Rep Gain**
26th	Tom Smith	Rep	Tom Smith	Rep Hold
26th	Greg Patterson	Rep	Robin Shaw	Rep Hold
27th	Gary Richardson	Rep	Laura Knaperek	Rep Hold
27th	Bob Edens	Rep	Mike Gardner	Rep Hold
28th	David Schweikert	Rep	Carolyn S. Allen	Rep Hold
28th	Lisa Graham	Rep	Wes Marsh	Rep Hold
29th	Lela Steffey	Rep	Mark Anderson	Rep Hold
29th	Pat Blake	Rep	Paul Mortensen	Rep Hold
30th	Mark W. Killian	Rep	Mark W. Killian	Rep Hold
30th	Jeff Groscost	Rep	Jeff Groscost	Rep Hold

== Detailed results by legislative district ==
Sources for election results:

=== District 1 ===
Primary Election Results
Party	Candidate	Votes	%
Republican Party Primary Results
Republican	Don Aldridge (incumbent)	11,682	54.75%
Republican	Sue Lynch (incumbent)	9,656	45.25%
Total votes		21,338	100.00%
Democratic Party Primary Results
Democratic	Dolores P. "Lori" Connelly	7,320	100.00%
Total votes		7,320	100.00%

General Election Results
Party	Candidate	Votes	%
Republican	Sue Lynch (incumbent)	31,204	40.06%
Republican	Don Aldridge (incumbent)	29,654	38.07%
Democratic	Dolores P. "Lori" Connelly	17,041	21.88%
Total votes		77,899	100.00%
Republican hold			
Republican hold			

=== District 2 ===
Primary Election Results
Party	Candidate	Votes	%
Republican Party Primary Results
Republican	John Verkamp (incumbent)	6,188	36.37%
Republican	Joe Hart (incumbent)	6,010	35.32%
Republican	Barbara Miller	4,818	28.31%
Total votes		17,016	100.00%
Democratic Party Primary Results
Democratic	Florence Karlstrom	6,557	100.00%
Total votes		6,557	100.00%

General Election Results
Party	Candidate	Votes	%
Republican	John Verkamp (incumbent)	24,771	39.69%
Republican	Joe Hart (incumbent)	19,989	32.03%
Democratic	Florence Karlstrom	17,644	28.27%
Total votes		62,404	100.00%
Republican hold			
Republican hold			

=== District 3 ===
Primary Election Results
Party	Candidate	Votes	%
Democratic Party Primary Results
Democratic	Jack C. Jackson (incumbent)	7,921	57.92%
Democratic	Benjamin Hanley (incumbent)	5,754	42.08%
Total votes		13,675	100.00%
Republican Party Primary Results
Republican	Ben Manuelito, Jr.	1,541	50.29%
Republican	Gilene Begay	1,523	49.71%
Total votes		3,064	100.00%

General Election Results
Party	Candidate	Votes	%
Democratic	Jack C. Jackson (incumbent)	17,254	35.89%
Democratic	Benjamin Hanley (incumbent)	14,351	29.86%
Republican	Gilene Begay	8,552	17.79%
Republican	Ben Manuelito, Jr.	7,912	16.46%
Total votes		48,069	100.00%
Democratic hold			
Democratic hold			

=== District 4 ===
Primary Election Results
Party	Candidate	Votes	%
Democratic Party Primary Results
Democratic	E. C. "Polly" Rosenbaum (incumbent)	9,109	38.64%
Democratic	Jack A. Brown (incumbent)	8,826	37.44%
Democratic	David Rodriguez	5,639	23.92%
Total votes		23,574	100.00%
Republican Party Primary Results
Republican	David C. Farnsworth (Note: The candidate ran a write-in campaign.)	582	100.00%
Total votes		582	100.00%

General Election Results
Party	Candidate	Votes	%
Republican	David C. Farnsworth	20,780	36.43%
Democratic	Jack A. Brown (incumbent)	18,266	32.02%
Democratic	E. C. "Polly" Rosenbaum (incumbent)	17,993	31.55%
Total votes		57,039	100.00%
Republican gain from Democratic			
Democratic hold			

=== District 5 ===
Primary Election Results
Party	Candidate	Votes	%
Democratic Party Primary Results
Democratic	Robert J. "Bob" McLendon (incumbent)	5,851	100.00%
Total votes		5,851	100.00%
Republican Party Primary Results
Republican	Pat Conner (incumbent)	4,436	71.32%
Republican	La Roy F. Smith, Sr.	1,784	28.68%
Total votes		6,220	100.00%

General Election Results
Party	Candidate	Votes	%
Republican	Pat Conner (incumbent)	14,938	41.92%
Democratic	Robert J. "Bob" McLendon (incumbent)	13,845	38.85%
Republican	La Roy F. Smith, Sr.	6,853	19.23%
Total votes		35,636	100.00%
Republican hold			
Democratic hold			

=== District 6 ===
Primary Election Results
Party	Candidate	Votes	%
Republican Party Primary Results
Republican	Lori S. Daniels (incumbent)	5,348	29.71%
Republican	Fulton Brock	4,432	24.62%
Republican	Richard Kyle (incumbent)	4,268	23.71%
Republican	Bill Mundell	3,953	21.96%
Total votes		18,001	100.00%
Libertarian Party Primary Results
Libertarian	John Marek	30	100.00%
Total votes		30	100.00%

General Election Results
Party	Candidate	Votes	%
Republican	Lori S. Daniels (incumbent)	27,935	48.19%
Republican	Fulton Brock	22,326	38.52%
Libertarian	John Marek	7,703	13.29%
Total votes		57,964	100.00%
Republican hold			
Republican hold			

=== District 7 ===
Primary Election Results
Party	Candidate	Votes	%
Democratic Party Primary Results
Democratic	Rebecca Rios	4,885	29.21%
Democratic	Harry Clark (incumbent)	4,043	24.17%
Democratic	Mike McCaffrey	3,542	21.18%
Democratic	H. B. "Dolly" Echeverria	3,276	19.59%
Democratic	Frank Aranda	980	5.86%
Total votes		16,726	100.00%
Libertarian Party Primary Results
Libertarian	Robert L. Camboni	1	100.00%
Total votes		1	100.00%

General Election Results
Party	Candidate	Votes	%
Democratic	Rebecca Rios	14,744	45.53%
Democratic	Harry Clark (incumbent)	13,388	41.35%
Libertarian	Robert L. Camboni	4,249	13.12%
Total votes		32,381	100.00%
Democratic hold			
Democratic hold			

=== District 8 ===
Primary Election Results
Party	Candidate	Votes	%
Democratic Party Primary Results
Democratic	Ruben F. Ortega (incumbent)	6,858	37.42%
Democratic	Paul Newman (incumbent)	6,434	35.11%
Democratic	Richard J. Saenz	5,035	27.47%
Total votes		18,327	100.00%
Republican Party Primary Results
Republican	Stephen Biles	3,812	100.00%
Total votes		3,812	100.00%

General Election Results
Party	Candidate	Votes	%
Democratic	Ruben F. Ortega (incumbent)	15,145	37.89%
Democratic	Paul Newman (incumbent)	14,270	35.70%
Republican	Stephen Biles	10,558	26.41%
Total votes		39,973	100.00%
Democratic hold			
Democratic hold			

=== District 9 ===
Primary Election Results
Party	Candidate	Votes	%
Republican Party Primary Results
Republican	Bill McGibbon (incumbent)	8,693	52.11%
Republican	Lou-Ann M. Preble (incumbent)	7,988	47.89%
Total votes		16,681	100.00%

General Election Results
Party	Candidate	Votes	%
Republican	Lou-Ann M. Preble (incumbent)	29,453	53.15%
Republican	Bill McGibbon (incumbent)	25,963	46.85%
Total votes		55,416	100.00%
Republican hold			
Republican hold			

=== District 10 ===
Primary Election Results
Party	Candidate	Votes	%
Democratic Party Primary Results
Democratic	Phillip Hubbard (incumbent)	3,649	31.31%
Democratic	Carmen Cajero (incumbent)	3,485	29.91%
Democratic	Betty J. Liggins	2,864	24.58%
Democratic	Jesse Grajeda	1,655	14.20%
Total votes		11,653	100.00%
Republican Party Primary Results
Republican	Robert "Bob" Motta	211	100.00%
Total votes		211	100.00%

General Election Results
Party	Candidate	Votes	%
Democratic	Carmen Cajero (incumbent)	11,515	39.19%
Democratic	Phillip Hubbard (incumbent)	10,717	36.47%
Republican	Robert "Bob" Motta	7,153	24.34%
Total votes		29,385	100.00%
Democratic hold			
Democratic hold			

=== District 11 ===
Primary Election Results
Party	Candidate	Votes	%
Democratic Party Primary Results
Democratic	Elaine Richardson (incumbent)	5,077	40.96%
Democratic	Jorge Luis Garcia (incumbent)	4,421	35.67%
Democratic	Lupita Shestko-Montiel	2,896	23.37%
Total votes		12,394	100.00%
Republican Party Primary Results
Republican	David C. Morales	2,701	100.00%
Total votes		2,701	100.00%

General Election Results
Party	Candidate	Votes	%
Democratic	Elaine Richardson (incumbent)	14,467	41.11%
Democratic	Jorge Luis Garcia (incumbent)	12,169	34.58%
Republican	David C. Morales	8,559	24.32%
Total votes		35,195	100.00%
Democratic hold			
Democratic hold			

=== District 12 ===
Primary Election Results
Party	Candidate	Votes	%
Republican Party Primary Results
Republican	Dan Schottel (incumbent)	7,268	36.84%
Republican	Winifred "Freddy" Hershberger (incumbent)	6,488	32.89%
Republican	Patricia "Pat" Coleman	5,972	30.27%
Total votes		19,728	100.00%
Democratic Party Primary Results
Democratic	David M. Perkins	7,479	100.00%
Total votes		7,479	100.00%

General Election Results
Party	Candidate	Votes	%
Republican	Winifred "Freddy" Hershberger (incumbent)	26,155	38.65%
Republican	Dan Schottel (incumbent)	22,008	32.52%
Democratic	David M. Perkins	19,503	28.82%
Total votes		67,666	100.00%
Republican hold			
Republican hold			

=== District 13 ===
Primary Election Results
Party	Candidate	Votes	%
Democratic Party Primary Results
Democratic	Andy Nichols (incumbent)	8,451	53.62%
Democratic	George Cunningham (incumbent)	7,311	46.38%
Total votes		15,762	100.00%
Republican Party Primary Results
Republican	D. Shane Wikfors	8,956	100.00%
Total votes		8,956	100.00%

General Election Results
Party	Candidate	Votes	%
Democratic	George Cunningham (incumbent)	23,308	35.21%
Democratic	Andy Nichols (incumbent)	23,012	34.76%
Republican	D. Shane Wikfors	19,880	30.03%
Total votes		66,200	100.00%
Democratic hold			
Democratic hold			

=== District 14 ===
Primary Election Results
Party	Candidate	Votes	%
Democratic Party Primary Results
Democratic	Herschella Horton (incumbent)	6,299	51.62%
Democratic	Marion L. Pickens	5,904	48.38%
Total votes		12,203	100.00%
Republican Party Primary Results
Republican	Charles H. "Chuck" Josephson	6,571	100.00%
Total votes		6,571	100.00%

General Election Results
Party	Candidate	Votes	%
Democratic	Marion L. Pickens	18,189	34.58%
Democratic	Herschella Horton (incumbent)	17,910	34.05%
Republican	Charles H. "Chuck" Josephson	16,498	31.37%
Total votes		52,597	100.00%
Democratic hold			
Democratic hold			

=== District 15 ===
Primary Election Results
Party	Candidate	Votes	%
Republican Party Primary Results
Republican	Jerry Overton (incumbent)	8,942	42.30%
Republican	Ned King (incumbent)	8,579	40.58%
Republican	Dale Lowrey	3,618	17.12%
Total votes		21,139	100.00%

General Election Results
Party	Candidate	Votes	%
Republican	Ned King (incumbent)	27,261	56.27%
Republican	Jerry Overton (incumbent)	21,183	43.73%
Total votes		48,444	100.00%
Republican hold			
Republican hold			

=== District 16 ===
Primary Election Results
Party	Candidate	Votes	%
Republican Party Primary Results
Republican	Jim Weiers	6,030	41.14%
Republican	Becky Jordan (incumbent)	4,343	29.63%
Republican	Frank Davidson	4,285	29.23%
Total votes		14,658	100.00%

General Election Results
Party	Candidate	Votes	%
Republican	Becky Jordan (incumbent)	23,817	60.86%
Republican	Jim Weiers	15,320	39.14%
Total votes		39,137	100.00%
Republican hold			
Republican hold			

=== District 17 ===
Primary Election Results
Party	Candidate	Votes	%
Republican Party Primary Results
Republican	Robert "Bob" Burns (incumbent)	7,667	37.87%
Republican	Jean McGrath	4,889	24.15%
Republican	Sandra L. Malone	4,446	21.96%
Republican	Ian Hugh	3,242	16.01%
Total votes		20,244	100.00%
Libertarian Party Primary Results
Libertarian	Gerald A. Patton	9	100.00%
Total votes		9	100.00%

General Election Results
Party	Candidate	Votes	%
Republican	Robert "Bob" Burns (incumbent)	22,839	45.12%
Republican	Jean McGrath	20,459	40.42%
Libertarian	Gerald A. Patton	7,320	14.46%
Total votes		50,618	100.00%
Republican hold			
Republican hold			

=== District 18 ===
Primary Election Results
Party	Candidate	Votes	%
Republican Party Primary Results
Republican	Barry Wong (incumbent)	7,303	35.08%
Republican	Susan Gerard (incumbent)	6,820	32.76%
Republican	Jerry Harris	6,696	32.16%
Total votes		20,819	100.00%
Libertarian Party Primary Results
Libertarian	Richard Rupert	10	66.67%
Libertarian	Chris Wilcoxson	5	33.33%
Total votes		15	100.00%

General Election Results
Party	Candidate	Votes	%
Republican	Susan Gerard (incumbent)	26,536	42.52%
Republican	Barry Wong (incumbent)	24,856	39.83%
Libertarian	Chris Wilcoxson	5,800	9.29%
Libertarian	Richard Rupert	5,218	8.36%
Total votes		62,410	100.00%
Republican hold			
Republican hold			

=== District 19 ===
Primary Election Results
Party	Candidate	Votes	%
Republican Party Primary Results
Republican	Scott Bundgaard	6,662	38.56%
Republican	David L. Eberhart (incumbent)	6,464	37.41%
Republican	Robert Cavaca	4,153	24.03%
Total votes		17,279	100.00%
Libertarian Party Primary Results
Libertarian	Tom Achtenberg	6	100.00%
Total votes		6	100.00%

General Election Results
Party	Candidate	Votes	%
Republican	David L. Eberhart (incumbent)	24,392	43.49%
Republican	Scott Bundgaard	24,197	43.14%
Libertarian	Tom Achtenberg	7,494	13.36%
Total votes		56,083	100.00%
Republican hold			
Republican hold			

=== District 20 ===
Primary Election Results
Party	Candidate	Votes	%
Democratic Party Primary Results
Democratic	Kathi Foster	3,503	42.35%
Democratic	Macario Garcia	2,501	30.23%
Democratic	Elise Salinger	2,268	27.42%
Total votes		8,272	100.00%
Republican Party Primary Results
Republican	Robert Blendu	3,237	56.63%
Republican	Jules Dembinski	2,479	43.37%
Total votes		5,716	100.00%

General Election Results
Party	Candidate	Votes	%
Democratic	Kathi Foster	10,144	27.97%
Republican	Robert Blendu	9,918	27.35%
Democratic	Macario Garcia	8,124	22.40%
Republican	Jules Dembinski	8,076	22.27%
Total votes		36,262	100.00%
Democratic hold			
Republican gain from Democratic			

=== District 21 ===
Primary Election Results
Party	Candidate	Votes	%
Republican Party Primary Results
Republican	Russell "Rusty" Bowers (incumbent)	7,930	53.59%
Republican	Marilyn Jarrett	6,823	46.11%
Republican	L. C. Estes	44	0.30%
Total votes		14,797	100.00%
Libertarian Party Primary Results
Libertarian	Ike Barker	17	100.00%
Total votes		17	100.00%

General Election Results
Party	Candidate	Votes	%
Republican	Marilyn Jarrett	22,959	45.93%
Republican	Russell "Rusty" Bowers (incumbent)	20,967	41.94%
Libertarian	Ike Barker	6,064	12.13%
Total votes		49,990	100.00%
Republican hold			
Republican hold			

=== District 22 ===
Primary Election Results
Party	Candidate	Votes	%
Democratic Party Primary Results
Democratic	Art Hamilton (incumbent)	3,216	54.52%
Democratic	Joe Eddie Lopez (incumbent)	2,683	45.48%
Total votes		5,899	100.00%

General Election Results
Party	Candidate	Votes	%
Democratic	Art Hamilton (incumbent)	8,613	56.97%
Democratic	Joe Eddie Lopez (incumbent)	6,438	42.58%
Independent	John Atkins	67	0.44%
Total votes		15,118	100.00%
Democratic hold			
Democratic hold			

=== District 23 ===
Primary Election Results
Party	Candidate	Votes	%
Democratic Party Primary Results
Democratic	Linda G. Aguirre (incumbent)	3,503	37.19%
Democratic	David Armstead (incumbent)	2,295	24.37%
Democratic	Sam Lopez	1,875	19.91%
Democratic	Leah Landrum McMurry	1,746	18.54%
Total votes		9,419	100.00%

General Election Results
Party	Candidate	Votes	%
Democratic	Linda G. Aguirre (incumbent)	9,286	58.48%
Democratic	David Armstead (incumbent)	6,592	41.52%
Total votes		15,878	100.00%
Democratic hold			
Democratic hold			

=== District 24 ===
Primary Election Results
Party	Candidate	Votes	%
Republican Party Primary Results
Republican	Ernie Baird (incumbent)	6,850	39.66%
Republican	Sue Grace (incumbent)	6,136	35.53%
Republican	Becky Fenger	4,284	24.81%
Total votes		17,270	100.00%
Democratic Party Primary Results
Democratic	Mark Fleisher	4,871	100.00%
Total votes		4,871	100.00%
Libertarian Party Primary Results
Libertarian	Gary Fallon	218	100.00%
Total votes		218	100.00%

General Election Results
Party	Candidate	Votes	%
Republican	Sue Grace (incumbent)	23,588	38.69%
Republican	Ernie Baird (incumbent)	19,875	32.60%
Democratic	Mark Fleisher	12,016	19.71%
Libertarian	Gary Fallon	5,495	9.01%
Total votes		60,974	100.00%
Republican hold			
Republican hold			

=== District 25 ===
Primary Election Results
Party	Candidate	Votes	%
Democratic Party Primary Results
Democratic	Ken Cheuvront	5,159	44.30%
Democratic	George A. Cordova	4,221	36.25%
Democratic	Frank R. Sacco	2,265	19.45%
Total votes		11,645	100.00%
Republican Party Primary Results
Republican	Robert Updike	3,907	27.09%
Republican	Richard Bistany	3,095	21.46%
Republican	Kathy Dubs	2,757	19.12%
Republican	Kevin Ganem	2,440	16.92%
Republican	Kathy Roediger	1,155	8.01%
Republican	Raena Honan	1,068	7.41%
Total votes		14,422	100.00%
Libertarian Party Primary Results
Libertarian	Manfred Alber	201	95.26%
Libertarian	Michael L. Hansford	10	4.74%
Total votes		211	100.00%

General Election Results
Party	Candidate	Votes	%
Democratic	Ken Cheuvront	13,595	24.11%
Republican	Robert Updike	13,565	24.05%
Republican	Richard Bistany	13,275	23.54%
Democratic	George A. Cordova	12,210	21.65%
Libertarian	Michael L. Hansford	2,074	3.68%
Libertarian	Manfred Alber	1,674	2.97%
Total votes		56,393	100.00%
Democratic hold			
Republican gain from Democratic			

=== District 26 ===
Primary Election Results
Party	Candidate	Votes	%
Republican Party Primary Results
Republican	Tom Smith (incumbent)	6,772	30.06%
Republican	Robin Shaw	5,438	24.14%
Republican	Mike Arenz	5,247	23.29%
Republican	James J. "Jim" Lemmon	2,960	13.14%
Republican	Terry Zajac	2,113	9.38%
Total votes		22,530	100.00%
Democratic Party Primary Results
Democratic	Manuel V. "Manny" Cisneros	6,155	100.00%
Total votes		6,155	100.00%
Libertarian Party Primary Results
Libertarian	Mike Trueblood	4	100.00%
Total votes		4	100.00%

General Election Results
Party	Candidate	Votes	%
Republican	Robin Shaw	24,986	36.67%
Republican	Tom Smith (incumbent)	24,006	35.23%
Democratic	Manuel V. "Manny" Cisneros	14,106	20.70%
Libertarian	Mike Trueblood	5,040	7.40%
Total votes		68,138	100.00%
Republican hold			
Republican hold			

=== District 27 ===
Primary Election Results
Party	Candidate	Votes	%
Republican Party Primary Results
Republican	Laura Knaperek	5,113	31.22%
Republican	Mike Gardner	4,554	27.81%
Republican	John D. MacDonald	4,522	27.62%
Republican	Gary D'Water	2,186	13.35%
Total votes		16,375	100.00%
Democratic Party Primary Results
Democratic	Marian Axford Shea	6,163	100.00%
Total votes		6,163	100.00%
Libertarian Party Primary Results
Libertarian	Tracy Dugger	13	100.00%
Total votes		13	100.00%

General Election Results
Party	Candidate	Votes	%
Republican	Laura Knaperek	22,302	36.69%
Republican	Mike Gardner	19,692	32.40%
Democratic	Marian Axford Shea	14,423	23.73%
Libertarian	Tracy Dugger	4,360	7.17%
Total votes		60,777	100.00%
Republican hold			
Republican hold			

=== District 28 ===
Primary Election Results
Party	Candidate	Votes	%
Republican Party Primary Results
Republican	Carolyn S. Allen	6,567	22.40%
Republican	Wes Marsh	5,449	18.59%
Republican	Gary Giordano	5,051	17.23%
Republican	Dennis E. Robbins	4,898	16.71%
Republican	Chandra Bonfiglio	3,859	13.16%
Republican	Larry Hagan	3,491	11.91%
Total votes		29,315	100.00%
Democratic Party Primary Results
Democratic	Rex Vesey	4,986	100.00%
Total votes		4,986	100.00%
Libertarian Party Primary Results
Libertarian	Robert Beggs	24	100.00%
Total votes		24	100.00%

General Election Results
Party	Candidate	Votes	%
Republican	Carolyn S. Allen	36,232	40.75%
Republican	Wes Marsh	32,671	36.75%
Democratic	Rex Vesey	15,332	17.24%
Libertarian	Robert Beggs	4,675	5.26%
Total votes		88,910	100.00%
Republican hold			
Republican hold			

=== District 29 ===
Primary Election Results
Party	Candidate	Votes	%
Republican Party Primary Results
Republican	Mark Anderson	5,422	38.52%
Republican	Paul Mortensen	5,320	37.79%
Republican	Brook DeWalt	3,334	23.69%
Total votes		14,076	100.00%
Democratic Party Primary Results
Democratic	Denise A. Heap	2,612	46.80%
Democratic	Jesse J. Chanley, Jr.	1,735	31.09%
Democratic	Roger J. Waun	1,234	22.11%
Total votes		5,581	100.00%

General Election Results
Party	Candidate	Votes	%
Republican	Mark Anderson	15,968	34.74%
Republican	Paul Mortensen	15,423	33.55%
Democratic	Denise A. Heap	7,875	17.13%
Democratic	Jesse J. Chanley, Jr.	6,700	14.58%
Total votes		45,966	100.00%
Republican hold			
Republican hold			

=== District 30 ===
Primary Election Results
Party	Candidate	Votes	%
Republican Party Primary Results
Republican	Mark W. Killian (incumbent)	10,707	47.10%
Republican	Jeff Groscost (incumbent)	7,343	32.30%
Republican	John Fillmore	4,683	20.60%
Total votes		22,733	100.00%
Democratic Party Primary Results
Democratic	Eileen Fellner	4,640	100.00%
Total votes		4,640	100.00%

General Election Results
Party	Candidate	Votes	%
Republican	Mark W. Killian (incumbent)	26,868	44.09%
Republican	Jeff Groscost (incumbent)	19,731	32.38%
Democratic	Eileen Fellner	14,337	23.53%
Total votes		60,936	100.00%
Republican hold			
Republican hold			

== See also ==
- 1994 United States elections
- 1994 United States Senate election in Arizona
- 1994 United States House of Representatives elections in Arizona
- 1994 Arizona gubernatorial election
- 1994 Arizona Senate election
- 42nd Arizona State Legislature
- Arizona House of Representatives
