= 42nd Arizona State Legislature =

Session of the Arizona Legislature

←	41st	43rd	→
- Arizona State Capitol (2014)

Overview
- Legislative body: Arizona State Legislature
- Jurisdiction: Arizona, United States
- Term: January 1, 1995 – December 31, 1996

Senate
- Members: 30
- President: John Greene
- Temporary President: John Wettaw
- Party control: Republican (19–11)

House of Representatives
- Members: 60
- Speaker: Mark Killian
- Party control: Republican (38–22)

Sessions
- 1st: January 9 – April 13, 1995
- 2nd: January 8 – April 20, 1996

Special sessions
- 1st: March 14 – March 16, 1995
- 2nd: March 23 – March 28, 1995
- 3rd: October 17 – October 17, 1995
- 4th: December 11 – December 13, 1995
- 5th: March 13 – March 26, 1996
- 6th: June 26 – June 26, 1996
- 7th: July 16 – July 18, 1996

The 42nd Arizona State Legislature, consisting of the Arizona State Senate and the Arizona House of Representatives, was constituted in Phoenix from January 1, 1995, to December 31, 1996, during the first two years of Fife Symington's second term as governor. Both the Senate and the House membership remained constant at 30 and 60, respectively. The Republicans increased their control in the Senate, gaining a seat and giving the a 19–11 majority. The Republicans also gained seats in the house, increasing their majority to 38–22.

== Sessions ==
The Legislature met for two regular sessions at the State Capitol in Phoenix. The first opened on January 9, 1995, and adjourned on April 13, while the Second Regular Session convened on January 8, 1996, and adjourned sine die on April 20.

There were seven Special Sessions, the first of which was convened on March 14, 1995, and adjourned on March 16; the second convened on March 23, 1995, and adjourned sine die on March 28; the third convened on October 17, 1995, and adjourned sine die later that same day; the fourth convened on December 11, 1995, and adjourned sine die on December 13; the fifth convened on March 13, 1996, and adjourned sine die March 26; the sixth convened on June 26, 1996, and adjourned sine die that same day; the seventh convened on July 16, 1996, and adjourned sine die on July 18.

== State Senate ==
=== Members ===
The asterisk (*) denotes members of the previous Legislature who continued in office as members of this Legislature.

District	Senator	Party	Notes
1	Carol Springer*	Republican	
2	John Wettaw*	Republican	
3	James Henderson Jr.*	Democrat	
4	A. V. "Bill" Hardt*	Democrat	
5	Jim Buster*	Republican	
6	John Huppenthal*	Republican	
7	Robert Chastain	Democrat	
8	Gus Arzberger*	Democrat	
9	Keith Bee*	Republican	
10	Victor Soltero*	Democrat	
11	Peter Goudinoff*	Democrat	
12	Ann Day*	Republican	
13	Patricia Noland*	Republican	
14	Ruth Solomon	Democrat	
15	Warren Austin Turner*	Republican	
16	John Kaites	Republican	
17	Brenda Burns	Republican	
18	Marc Spitzer*	Republican	
19	Jan Brewer*	Republican	
20	Mary Hartley	Democrat	
21	Stan Barnes	Republican	
22	Manuel "Lito" Pena*	Democrat	
23	Sandra Kennedy*	Democrat	
24	John Greene*	Republican	
25	Chris Cummiskey	Democrat	
26	Tom Patterson*	Republican	
27	Gary Richardson	Republican	
28	Randall Gnant	Republican	
29	David Peterson	Republican	
30	Larry Chesley	Republican	

== House of Representatives ==
=== Members ===
The asterisk (*) denotes members of the previous Legislature who continued in office as members of this Legislature.

District	Representative	Party	Notes
1	Donald R. Aldridge*	Republican	
1	Sue Lynch*	Republican	
2	Joe Hart*	Republican	
2	John Verkamp*	Republican	
3	Benjamin Hanley*	Democrat	
3	Jack Jackson Sr.*	Democrat	
4	Jack A. Brown*	Democrat	
4	Dave Farnsworth	Republican	
5	Pat Conner	Republican	
5	Robert McLendon	Democrat	
6	Fulton Brock	Republican	
6	Lori Daniels*	Republican	
7	Harry R. Clark*	Democrat	
7	Rebecca Rios	Democrat	
8	Paul Newman*	Democrat	
8	Ruben F. Ortega*	Democrat	
9	W. A. McGibbon*	Republican	
9	Lou-Ann Preble*	Republican	
10	Carmen Cajero*	Democrat	
10	Phillip Hubbard*	Democrat	
11	Jorge Luis Garcia*	Democrat	
11	Elaine Richardson*	Democrat	
12	Winifred Hershberger*	Republican	
12	Dan Schottel*	Republican	
13	George Cunningham*	Democrat	
13	Andy Nichols*	Democrat	
14	Herschella Horton*	Democrat	
14	Marion Lee Pickens	Democrat	
15	Ned King*	Republican	
15	Jerry Overton*	Republican	
16	Becky Jordan*	Republican	
16	James Weiers	Republican	
17	Robert Burns*	Republican	
17	Jean McGrath	Republican	
18	Susan Gerard*	Republican	
18	Barry Wong*	Republican	
19	Scott Bundgaard	Republican	
19	David Eberhart*	Republican	
20	Robert Blendu	Republican	
20	Kathi Foster	Democrat	
21	Russell W. Bowers*	Republican	
21	Marilyn Jarrett	Republican	
22	Art Hamilton*	Democrat	
22	Joe Eddie Lopez*	Democrat	
23	Linda Aguirre*	Democrat	
23	David Armstead*	Democrat	
24	J. Ernest Baird*	Republican	
24	Sue Grace*	Republican	
25	Ken Cheuvront	Democrat	
25	Robert Updike	Republican	
26	Robin Shaw	Republican	
26	Tom Smith*	Republican	
27	Michael Gardner	Republican	
27	Laura Knaperek	Republican	
28	Carolyn Allen	Republican	
28	Wesley Marsh	Republican	
29	Mark Anderson	Republican	
29	Paul Mortensen	Republican	
30	Jeff Groscost*	Republican	
30	Mark Killian*	Republican	
