= 1992 Arizona House of Representatives election =

1992 Arizona House of Representatives elections
- November 3, 1992

All 60 seats in the Arizona House 31 seats needed for a majority
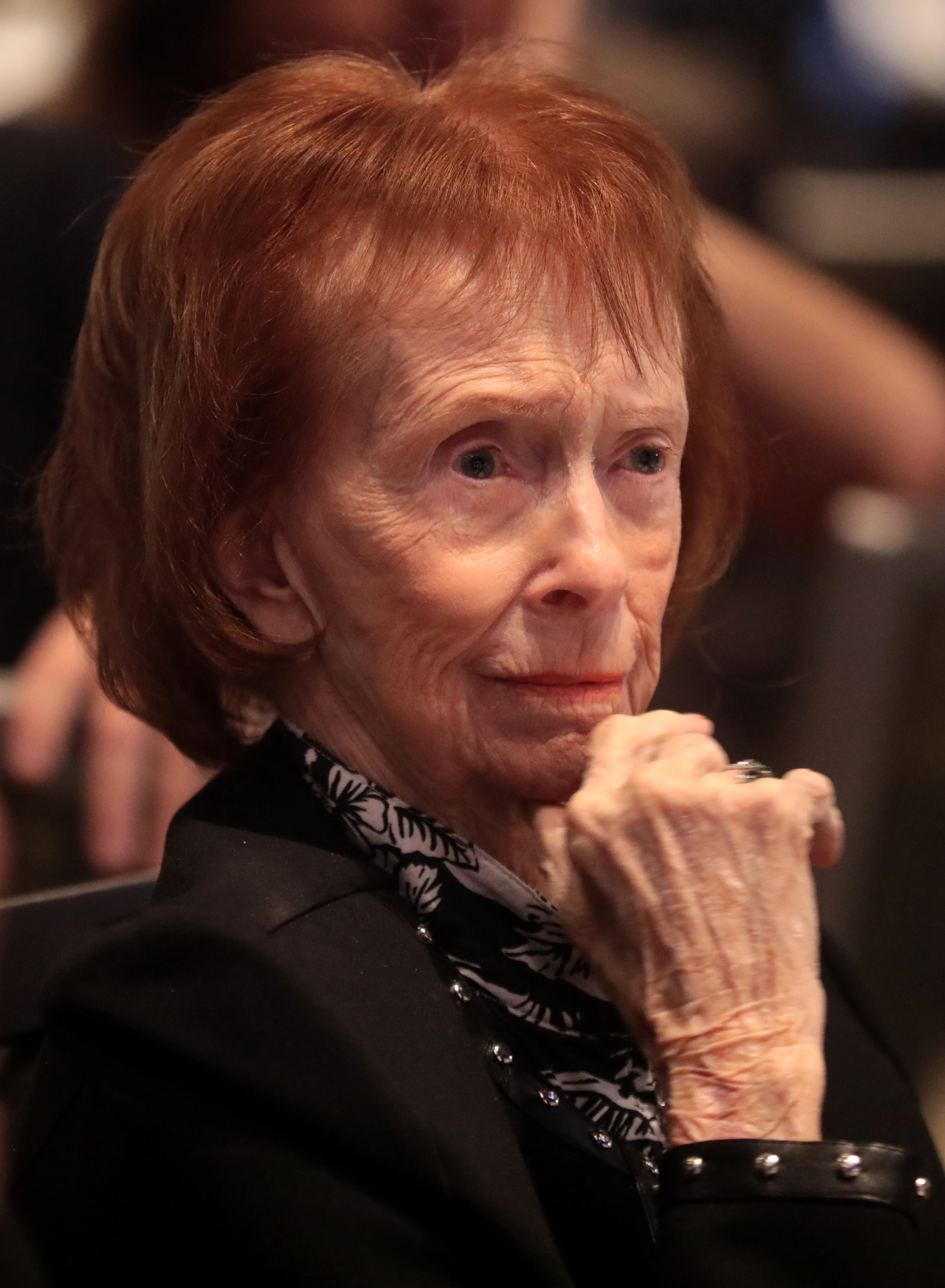

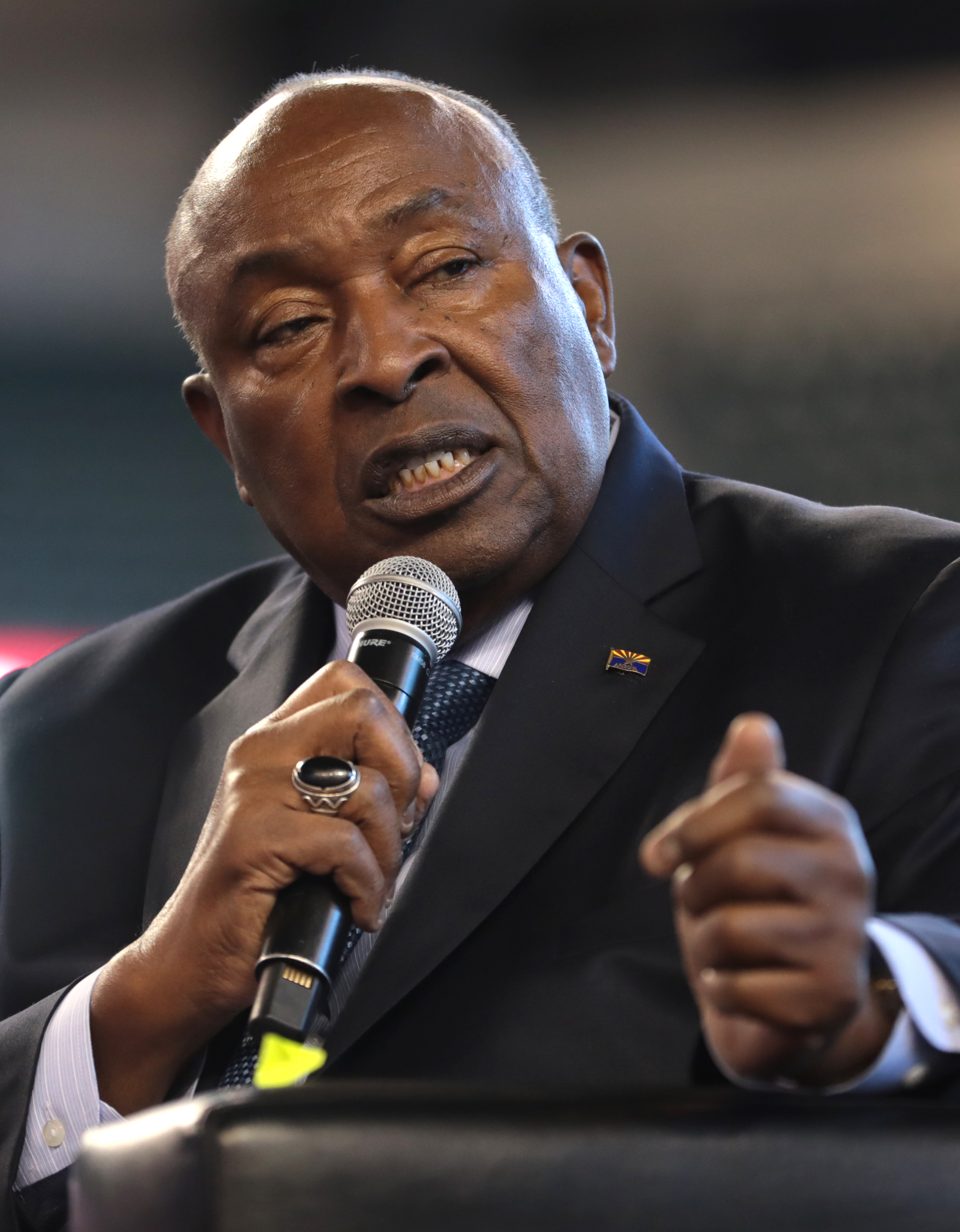
	Majority party	Minority party
Leader	Jane Dee Hull	Art Hamilton
Party	Republican	Democratic
Leader's seat	18th	22nd
Last election	33	27
Seats after	35	25
Seat change	▲2	▼2
- Results: Democratic hold Democratic gain Republican hold Republican gain
Speaker before election
Jane Dee Hull
Republican
Elected Speaker
Mark W. Killian
Republican

The 1992 Arizona House of Representatives elections were held on November 3, 1992. Voters elected all 60 members of the Arizona House of Representatives in multi-member districts to serve a two-year term. These were the first elections following the 1990 United States redistricting cycle. The elections coincided with the elections for other offices, including U.S. Senate, U.S. House, and State Senate. Primary elections were held on September 8, 1992.

Prior to the elections, the Republicans held a majority of 33 seats over the Democrats' 27 seats.

The elections occurred in the wake of the AzSCAM scandal, which resulted in a full tenth of the Arizona legislature resigning. A bipartisan debacle, AzSCAM concluded with two in-depth reports on corruption in the House.

Following the elections, Republicans maintained control of the chamber and expanded their majority to 35 Republicans to 25 Democrats, a net gain of two seats for Republicans.

The newly elected members served in the 41st Arizona State Legislature, during which Republican Mark W. Killian was elected as Speaker of the Arizona House. (Note: Killian was elected as Speaker for the 41st legislature, defeating Democratic Leader Representative Art Hamilton, who was also nominated for Speaker. The vote tally for Speaker was: Killian-34 votes to Hamilton-25 votes. Please note that the total number of votes for Speaker in 1993 sums to only 59 because Representative Wessel was not present to vote.)

== Retiring Incumbents ==
=== Democrats ===
1. District 5: Herb Guenther
2. District 6: Henry Evans
3. District 7: Richard "Dick" Pacheco
4. District 7: Frank "Art" Celaya
5. District 8: Mike Palmer
6. District 11: Peter Goudinoff (Note: Elected to the Arizona State Senate.)
7. District 11: John Kromko
8. District 13: Eleanor D. Schorr (Note: Ran for the Arizona State Senate; lost to Patricia A. "Patti" Noland.)
9. District 23: Rev. Dr. George Benjamin Brooks Sr.
10. District 23: Sandra Kennedy (Note: Elected to the Arizona State Senate.)

=== Republicans ===
1. District 1: Dave Carson
2. District 2: John Wettaw (Note: Elected to the Arizona State Senate.)
3. District 9: Keith A. Bee (Note: Elected to the Arizona State Senate.)
4. District 12: Jack B. Jewett
5. District 12: Ruth E. Eskesen
6. District 13: Patricia A. "Patti" Noland (Note: Elected to the Arizona State Senate.)
7. District 15: Kyle W. Hindman (Note: Ran for the Arizona State Senate; lost to Austin Turner in the Republican primary.)
8. District 15: Bob Williams
9. District 16: Karen Mills
10. District 16: Dave McCarroll
11. District 21: Stan Barnes (Note: Ran for Arizona's 1st congressional district in the 1992 U.S. House elections, but lost in the Republican primary to incumbent John Jacob Rhodes III.)
12. District 27: Bev Hermon (Note: Elected to the Arizona State Senate.)
13. District 30: William "Bill" A. Mundell (Note: Ran for Arizona's 1st congressional district in the 1992 U.S. House elections, but lost in the Republican primary to incumbent John Jacob Rhodes III.)

== Incumbents Defeated in General Elections ==
=== Democrats ===
1. District 9: Marion L. Pickens

=== Republicans ===
1. District 2: Ben Benton (Note: Ran for re-election as an "Independent Republican;" lost the general election.)
2. District 7: Roger D. Hooper (Note: Republican Roger D. Hooper was sworn in 3/19/1991 to replace Jim Hartdegen who resigned 3/12/1991 as part of the AzSCAM scandal.) (Note: Redistricted from district 6 to 7.)

== Summary of Results by Arizona State Legislative District ==
District	Incumbent	Party	Elected Representative	Outcome
1st	Don Aldridge	Rep	Don Aldridge	Rep Hold
1st	Dave Carson	Rep	Sue Lynch	Rep Hold
2nd	John Wettaw	Rep	Joe Hart	Rep Hold
2nd	Ben Benton	Rep	John Verkamp	Rep Hold
3rd	Benjamin Hanley	Dem	Benjamin Hanley	Dem Hold
3rd	Jack C. Jackson	Dem	Jack C. Jackson	Dem Hold
4th	E. C. "Polly" Rosenbaum	Dem	E. C. "Polly" Rosenbaum	Dem Hold
4th	Jack A. Brown	Dem	Jack A. Brown	Dem Hold
5th	Robert J. "Bob" McLendon	Dem	Robert J. "Bob" McLendon	Dem Hold
5th	Herb Guenther	Dem	Earl Patrick "Pat" Conner	Rep Gain
6th	Roger D. Hooper	Rep	Lori S. Daniels	Rep Hold
6th	Henry Evans	Dem	Richard Kyle	Rep Gain
7th	Richard "Dick" Pacheco	Dem	Robert "Bob" Chastain	Dem Hold
7th	Frank "Art" Celaya	Dem	Harry R. Clark	Dem Hold
8th	Ruben Ortega	Dem	Ruben Ortega	Dem Hold
8th	Mike Palmer	Dem	Paul Newman	Dem Hold
9th	Keith A. Bee	Rep	Bill McGibbon	Rep Hold
9th	Marion L. Pickens	Dem	Lou-Ann M. Preble	Rep Gain
10th	Carmen Cajero	Dem	Carmen Cajero	Dem Hold
10th	Phillip Hubbard	Dem	Phillip Hubbard	Dem Hold
11th	Peter Goudinoff	Dem	Elaine Richardson	Dem Hold
11th	John Kromko	Dem	Jorge Luis Garcia	Dem Hold
12th	Jack B. Jewett	Rep	Dan Schottel	Rep Hold
12th	Ruth E. Eskesen	Rep	Winifred "Freddy" Hershberger	Rep Hold
13th	Patricia A. "Patti" Noland	Rep	Andy Nichols	Dem Gain
13th	Eleanor D. Schorr	Dem	George Cunningham	Dem Hold
14th	Ruth Solomon	Dem	Ruth Solomon	Dem Hold
14th	Herschella Horton	Dem	Herschella Horton	Dem Hold
15th	Kyle W. Hindman	Rep	Ned King	Rep Hold
15th	Bob Williams	Rep	Jerry Overton	Rep Hold
16th	Karen Mills	Rep	John Kaites	Rep Hold
16th	Dave McCarroll	Rep	Becky Jordan	Rep Hold
17th	Brenda Burns	Rep	Brenda Burns	Rep Hold
17th	Robert "Bob" Burns	Rep	Robert "Bob" Burns	Rep Hold
18th	Jane Dee Hull	Rep	Jane Dee Hull (Note: Republican Barry Wong was appointed by Maricopa County Board of Supervisors on Oct. 8, 1993 to fill unexpired term of Jane Dee Hull, who resigned on Oct. 4, 1993. Wong was sworn in as State Representative of District 18 on Oct. 14, 1993.)	Rep Hold
18th	Susan Gerard	Rep	Susan Gerard	Rep Hold
19th	Nancy Wessel	Rep	Nancy Wessel (Note: Republican David L. Eberhart was appointed by Maricopa County Board of Supervisors on April 19, 1993 to fill unexpired term of Nancy K. Wessel, who resigned on April 12, 1993. Eberhart was sworn in as State Representative of District 19 on April 20, 1993.)	Rep Hold
19th	John C. Keegan (Note: Republican John C. Keegan was sworn in 3/12/1991 to replace Don Kenney who resigned 2/28/1991 as part of the AzSCAM scandal.)	Rep	John C. Keegan	Rep Hold
20th	Debbie McCune-Davis	Dem	Debbie McCune-Davis	Dem Hold
20th	Linda D. Beezley (Note: Democrat Linda D. Beezley was sworn in 3/4/1991 to replace Bobby Raymond who resigned 2/19/1991 as part of the AzSCAM scandal.)	Dem	Linda D. Beezley	Dem Hold
21st	Leslie Whiting Johnson	Rep	Leslie Whiting Johnson	Rep Hold
21st	Stan Barnes	Rep	Russell Wesley Bowers	Rep Hold
22nd	Art Hamilton	Dem	Art Hamilton	Dem Hold
22nd	Joe Eddie Lopez (Note: Democrat Joe Eddie Lopez was sworn in 1/24/1991 to replace Earl V. Wilcox who never took the oath of office for this seat, causing a vacancy.)	Dem	Joe Eddie Lopez	Dem Hold
23rd	Rev. Dr. George Benjamin Brooks Sr. (Note: Democrat George B. "G. Benjamin" Brooks was sworn in 4/2/1991 to replace Armando Ruiz who resigned 4/1/1991.)	Dem	Linda G. Aguirre	Dem Hold
23rd	Sandra Kennedy	Dem	David Armstead	Dem Hold
24th	Sue Grace	Rep	Sue Grace	Rep Hold
24th	Ernie Baird (Note: Republican J. Ernest Baird was sworn in 3/14/1991 to replace Candice Nagel who resigned 3/7/1991 as part of the AzSCAM scandal.)	Rep	Ernie Baird	Rep Hold
25th	Chris Cummiskey	Dem	Chris Cummiskey	Dem Hold
25th	Cathy Eden (Note: Democrat Catherine R. Eden was sworn in 3/26/1991 to replace Sue Laybe who resigned 3/13/1991 as part of the AzSCAM scandal.)	Dem	Cathy Eden	Dem Hold
26th	Greg Patterson	Rep	Greg Patterson	Rep Hold
26th	Tom Smith (Note: Republican Tom Smith was sworn in 3/25/1991 to replace Jim Meredith who resigned 3/12/1991 as part of the AzSCAM scandal.)	Rep	Tom Smith	Rep Hold
27th	Gary Richardson	Rep	Gary Richardson	Rep Hold
27th	Bev Hermon	Rep	Bob Edens	Rep Hold
28th	David Schweikert	Rep	David Schweikert	Rep Hold
28th	Lisa Graham	Rep	Lisa Graham	Rep Hold
29th	Lela Steffey	Rep	Lela Steffey	Rep Hold
29th	Pat Blake	Rep	Pat Blake	Rep Hold
30th	Mark W. Killian	Rep	Mark W. Killian	Rep Hold
30th	William "Bill" A. Mundell	Rep	Jeff Groscost	Rep Hold

== Detailed Results ==
=== District 1 ===
Primary Election Results
Party	Candidate	Votes	%
Republican Party Primary Results
Republican	Don Aldridge (incumbent)	10,243	38.42%
Republican	Sue Lynch	9,000	33.76%
Republican	Michael "Mike" Sanders	7,416	27.82%
Total votes		26,659	100.00%
Libertarian Party Primary Results
Libertarian	Lorene Van Buren	34	100.00%
Total votes		34	100.00%

General Election Results
Party	Candidate	Votes	%
Republican	Sue Lynch	38,284	45.15%
Republican	Don Aldridge (incumbent)	34,837	41.09%
Libertarian	Lorene Van Buren	11,666	13.76%
Total votes		84,787	100.00%
Republican hold			
Republican hold			

=== District 2 ===
Primary Election Results
Party	Candidate	Votes	%
Democratic Party Primary Results
Democratic	Ginger Engen	5,667	53.93%
Democratic	Joe E. Lingerfelt	4,842	46.07%
Total votes		10,509	100.00%
Republican Party Primary Results
Republican	John Verkamp	8,949	93.94%
Republican	Joe Hart (Note: Was a write-in candidate in the primary election.)	577	6.06%
Total votes		9,526	100.00%
Libertarian Party Primary Results
Libertarian	Clifford "Sunny" Reid Jr.	45	54.88%
Libertarian	Eric Boudette	37	45.12%
Total votes		82	100.00%

General Election Results
Party	Candidate	Votes	%
Republican	John Verkamp	26,738	28.46%
Republican	Joe Hart	19,696	20.96%
Democratic	Ginger Engen	19,015	20.24%
Democratic	Joe E. Lingerfelt	18,201	19.37%
Independent	Ben Benton (incumbent)	5,532	5.89%
Libertarian	Clifford "Sunny" Reid Jr.	2,430	2.59%
Libertarian	Eric Boudette	2,345	2.50%
Total votes		93,957	100.00%
Republican hold			
Republican hold			

=== District 3 ===
Primary Election Results
Party	Candidate	Votes	%
Democratic Party Primary Results
Democratic	Jack C. Jackson (incumbent)	9,424	57.15%
Democratic	Benjamin Hanley (incumbent)	7,065	42.85%
Total votes		16,489	100.00%
Republican Party Primary Results
Republican	Ben Manuelito Jr.	3,129	100.00%
Total votes		3,129	100.00%

General Election Results
Party	Candidate	Votes	%
Democratic	Jack C. Jackson (incumbent)	20,717	44.31%
Democratic	Benjamin Hanley (incumbent)	17,365	37.14%
Republican	Ben Manuelito Jr.	8,674	18.55%
Total votes		46,756	100.00%
Democratic hold			
Democratic hold			

=== District 4 ===
Primary Election Results
Party	Candidate	Votes	%
Democratic Party Primary Results
Democratic	E.C. "Polly" Rosenbaum (incumbent)	12,819	51.78%
Democratic	Jack A. Brown (incumbent)	11,940	48.22%
Total votes		24,759	100.00%
Republican Party Primary Results
Republican	Bennie J. Taylor	5,056	51.43%
Republican	Vernon M. Stiffler	4,775	48.57%
Total votes		9,831	100.00%

General Election Results
Party	Candidate	Votes	%
Democratic	Jack A. Brown (incumbent)	23,965	30.67%
Democratic	E. C. "Polly" Rosenbaum (incumbent)	23,857	30.54%
Republican	Vernon M. Stiffler	15,442	19.77%
Republican	Bennie J. Taylor	14,864	19.03%
Total votes		78,128	100.00%
Democratic hold			
Democratic hold			

=== District 5 ===
Primary Election Results
Party	Candidate	Votes	%
Democratic Party Primary Results
Democratic	Robert J. "Bob" McLendon (incumbent)	7,166	66.46%
Democratic	William T. Riley	3,616	33.54%
Total votes		10,782	100.00%
Republican Party Primary Results
Republican	Pat Conner	5,073	65.50%
Republican	La Roy F. Smith, Sr.	2,672	34.50%
Total votes		7,745	100.00%

General Election Results
Party	Candidate	Votes	%
Democratic	Robert J. "Bob" McLendon (incumbent)	19,603	36.27%
Republican	Pat Conner	17,323	32.05%
Democratic	William T. Riley	10,223	18.91%
Republican	La Roy F. Smith, Sr.	6,899	12.76%
Total votes		54,048	100.00%
Democratic hold			
Republican gain from Democratic			

=== District 6 ===
Primary Election Results
Party	Candidate	Votes	%
Democratic Party Primary Results
Democratic	Marion Muriel Weich	3,323	62.78%
Democratic	Philip Hettmansperger	1,970	37.22%
Total votes		5,293	100.00%
Republican Party Primary Results
Republican	Lori S. Daniels	4,567	28.15%
Republican	Richard Kyle (Note: After John Gaylord & Richard Kyle tied in the Republican primary in both the original count and the recount, the candidates played a hand of poker to determine the winner, which was won by Kyle.)	3,762	23.19%
Republican	John Gaylord	3,762	23.19%
Republican	Fran Emerson	2,823	17.40%
Republican	"Al" Alexander Marinakis	1,307	8.06%
Total votes		16,221	100.00%

General Election Results
Party	Candidate	Votes	%
Republican	Lori S. Daniels	29,500	31.05%
Republican	Richard Kyle	28,238	29.72%
Democratic	Marion Muriel Weich	15,476	16.29%
Democratic	Philip Hettmansperger	11,189	11.78%
Independent	Bil Bruno	5,938	6.25%
Independent	Mary Jensen (Note: Ran as an "Independent Grassroots" candidate.)	4,660	4.91%
Total votes		95,001	100.00%
Republican hold			
Republican gain from Democratic			

=== District 7 ===
Primary Election Results
Party	Candidate	Votes	%
Democratic Party Primary Results
Democratic	Robert "Bob" Chastain	4,718	27.49%
Democratic	Harry R. Clark	4,520	26.34%
Democratic	Mary "Robin" Barker	4,458	25.98%
Democratic	Peter VillaVerde	3,466	20.20%
Total votes		17,162	100.00%
Republican Party Primary Results
Republican	Roger Hooper (incumbent)	2,908	100.00%
Total votes		2,908	100.00%

General Election Results
Party	Candidate	Votes	%
Democratic	Robert "Bob" Chastain	15,031	35.27%
Democratic	Harry R. Clark	14,777	34.68%
Republican	Roger Hooper (incumbent)	12,805	30.05%
Total votes		42,613	100.00%
Democratic hold			
Democratic hold			

=== District 8 ===
Primary Election Results
Party	Candidate	Votes	%
Democratic Party Primary Results
Democratic	Ruben Ortega (incumbent)	10,468	40.77%
Democratic	Paul Newman	6,036	23.51%
Democratic	Page Bakarich	5,069	19.74%
Democratic	John Arbuthnot	4,045	15.75%
Democratic	Policarpio Castellano	57	0.22%
Total votes		25,675	100.00%
Republican Party Primary Results
Republican	Ramiro "Tito" Ross	5,777	100.00%
Total votes		5,777	100.00%

General Election Results
Party	Candidate	Votes	%
Democratic	Ruben Ortega (incumbent)	21,606	39.34%
Democratic	Paul Newman	18,175	33.09%
Republican	Ramiro "Tito" Ross	15,138	27.56%
Total votes		54,919	100.00%
Democratic hold			
Democratic hold			

=== District 9 ===
Primary Election Results
Party	Candidate	Votes	%
Democratic Party Primary Results
Democratic	Marion L. Pickens (incumbent)	6,195	60.06%
Democratic	Chuck Core	4,119	39.94%
Total votes		10,314	100.00%
Republican Party Primary Results
Republican	Lou-Ann M. Preble	6,212	30.27%
Republican	Bill McGibbon	5,658	27.57%
Republican	Ray G. Clark	5,139	25.04%
Republican	Bruce P. Murchison	3,514	17.12%
Total votes		20,523	100.00%

General Election Results
Party	Candidate	Votes	%
Republican	Bill McGibbon	22,708	26.60%
Republican	Lou-Ann M. Preble	22,251	26.06%
Democratic	Marion L. Pickens (incumbent)	21,333	24.99%
Democratic	Chuck Core	19,089	22.36%
Total votes		85,381	100.00%
Republican hold			
Republican gain from Democratic			

=== District 10 ===
Primary Election Results
Party	Candidate	Votes	%
Democratic Party Primary Results
Democratic	Carmen Cajero (incumbent)	4,791	38.55%
Democratic	Phillip Hubbard (incumbent)	4,222	33.97%
Democratic	Betty J. Liggins	3,416	27.48%
Total votes		12,429	100.00%
Libertarian Party Primary Results
Libertarian	Thomas F. Lanik	27	100.00%
Total votes		27	100.00%

General Election Results
Party	Candidate	Votes	%
Democratic	Carmen Cajero (incumbent)	18,143	47.41%
Democratic	Phillip Hubbard (incumbent)	16,022	41.87%
Libertarian	Thomas F. Lanik	4,100	10.71%
Total votes		38,265	100.00%
Democratic hold			
Democratic hold			

=== District 11 ===
Primary Election Results
Party	Candidate	Votes	%
Democratic Party Primary Results
Democratic	Elaine Richardson	4,601	27.46%
Democratic	Jorge Luis Garcia	4,006	23.91%
Democratic	Phil Lopes	3,482	20.78%
Democratic	Paul D. Graham	2,006	11.97%
Democratic	G.J. "Louie" Walters	1,409	8.41%
Democratic	Michael D. Bryan	1,250	7.46%
Total votes		16,754	100.00%
Republican Party Primary Results
Republican	Mike Price	3,071	100.00%
Total votes		3,071	100.00%
Green Party Primary Results
Green	Carolyn Campbell	28	100.00%
Total votes		28	100.00%
Libertarian Party Primary Results
Libertarian	Arthur Miscione	23	100.00%
Total votes		23	100.00%

General Election Results
Party	Candidate	Votes	%
Democratic	Elaine Richardson	17,189	35.35%
Democratic	Jorge Luis Garcia	14,981	30.81%
Republican	Mike Price	9,577	19.70%
Green	Carolyn Campbell	5,472	11.25%
Libertarian	Arthur Miscione	1,403	2.89%
Total votes		48,622	100.00%
Democratic hold			
Democratic hold			

=== District 12 ===
Primary Election Results
Party	Candidate	Votes	%
Democratic Party Primary Results
Democratic	Craig Runyon	53	100.00%
Total votes		53	100.00%
Republican Party Primary Results
Republican	Winifred "Freddy" Hershberger	6,594	35.35%
Republican	Dan Schottel	6,288	33.71%
Republican	Pat Coleman	5,769	30.93%
Total votes		18,651	100.00%
Green Party Primary Results
Green	David M. Perkins	2	100.00%
Total votes		2	100.00%
Libertarian Party Primary Results
Libertarian	Karen Ewing	36	100.00%
Total votes		36	100.00%

General Election Results
Party	Candidate	Votes	%
Republican	Winifred "Freddy" Hershberger	30,806	35.07%
Republican	Dan Schottel	26,458	30.12%
Independent	Barbara Holtzman	18,114	20.62%
Libertarian	Karen Ewing	7,775	8.85%
Green	David M. Perkins	4,686	5.33%
Total votes		87,839	100.00%
Republican hold			
Republican hold			

=== District 13 ===
Primary Election Results
Party	Candidate	Votes	%
Democratic Party Primary Results
Democratic	Andy Nichols	7,041	44.21%
Democratic	George Cunningham	5,426	34.07%
Democratic	David Bradley	3,459	21.72%
Total votes		15,926	100.00%
Republican Party Primary Results
Republican	Tony Terry	6,453	36.85%
Republican	Patricia A. "Pat" Beatty	5,872	33.53%
Republican	Terri Locastro	5,186	29.62%
Total votes		17,511	100.00%
Libertarian Party Primary Results
Libertarian	Michael A. Jones	58	50.43%
Libertarian	Kenneth N. Bykerk	57	49.57%
Total votes		115	100.00%

General Election Results
Party	Candidate	Votes	%
Democratic	Andy Nichols	26,573	26.56%
Democratic	George Cunningham	25,450	25.43%
Republican	Tony Terry	24,120	24.10%
Republican	Patricia A. "Pat" Beatty	20,419	20.41%
Libertarian	Michael A. Jones	1,963	1.96%
Libertarian	Kenneth N. Bykerk	1,542	1.54%
Total votes		100,067	100.00%
Democratic hold			
Democratic gain from Republican			

=== District 14 ===
Primary Election Results
Party	Candidate	Votes	%
Democratic Party Primary Results
Democratic	Ruth Solomon (incumbent)	6,757	60.78%
Democratic	Herschella Horton (incumbent)	4,360	39.22%
Democratic	Bruce A. Friedemann	1	0.01%
Total votes		11,118	100.00%
Libertarian Party Primary Results
Libertarian	Kimberly Swanson	48	51.61%
Libertarian	Mark Stachyra	45	48.39%
Total votes		93	100.00%

General Election Results
Party	Candidate	Votes	%
Democratic	Ruth Solomon (incumbent)	31,518	44.25%
Democratic	Herschella Horton (incumbent)	24,130	33.87%
Libertarian	Kimberly Swanson	7,458	10.47%
Libertarian	Mark Stachyra	5,232	7.34%
Independent	June Excell (Note: Ran as a "Declaration of Independents" candidate.)	2,897	4.07%
Total votes		71,235	100.00%
Democratic hold			
Democratic hold			

=== District 15 ===
Primary Election Results
Party	Candidate	Votes	%
Democratic Party Primary Results
Democratic	R. Wes Stephens	3,922	57.32%
Democratic	Jack C. Bramlette	2,920	42.68%
Total votes		6,842	100.00%
Republican Party Primary Results
Republican	Ned King	6,849	38.64%
Republican	Jerry Overton	6,093	34.37%
Republican	Keith Poletis	4,785	26.99%
Total votes		17,727	100.00%

General Election Results
Party	Candidate	Votes	%
Republican	Ned King	25,273	32.19%
Republican	Jerry Overton	24,438	31.13%
Democratic	R. Wes Stephens	15,668	19.96%
Democratic	Jack C. Bramlette	13,124	16.72%
Total votes		78,503	100.00%
Republican hold			
Republican hold			

=== District 16 ===
Primary Election Results
Party	Candidate	Votes	%
Democratic Party Primary Results
Democratic	Kate Lehman	4,062	100.00%
Total votes		4,062	100.00%
Republican Party Primary Results
Republican	John Kaites	4,367	30.69%
Republican	Becky Jordan	3,563	25.04%
Republican	James Weiers	3,479	24.45%
Republican	Frank Davidson	1,219	8.57%
Republican	Jerry Benson	888	6.24%
Republican	Theodore "Ted" Carman	713	5.01%
Total votes		14,229	100.00%

General Election Results
Party	Candidate	Votes	%
Republican	Becky Jordan	24,507	35.87%
Republican	John Kaites	23,363	34.19%
Democratic	Kate Lehman	20,454	29.94%
Total votes		68,324	100.00%
Republican hold			
Republican hold			

=== District 17 ===
Primary Election Results
Party	Candidate	Votes	%
Republican Party Primary Results
Republican	Brenda Burns (incumbent)	8,527	46.03%
Republican	Robert "Bob" Burns (incumbent)	7,838	42.31%
Republican	Randy Afdahl	2,161	11.66%
Total votes		18,526	100.00%

General Election Results
Party	Candidate	Votes	%
Republican	Brenda Burns (incumbent)	34,071	54.77%
Republican	Robert "Bob" Burns (incumbent)	28,135	45.23%
Total votes		62,206	100.00%
Republican hold			
Republican hold			

=== District 18 ===
Primary Election Results
Party	Candidate	Votes	%
Democratic Party Primary Results
Democratic	Zachary Winograd	4,575	100.00%
Total votes		4,575	100.00%
Republican Party Primary Results
Republican	Jane Dee Hull (incumbent)	6,948	50.23%
Republican	Susan Gerard (incumbent)	6,885	49.77%
Total votes		13,833	100.00%
Libertarian Party Primary Results
Libertarian	Ed Drew	20	100.00%
Total votes		20	100.00%

General Election Results
Party	Candidate	Votes	%
Republican	Jane Dee Hull (incumbent)	28,704	36.07%
Republican	Susan Gerard (incumbent)	28,575	35.91%
Democratic	Zachary Winograd	15,495	19.47%
Libertarian	Ed Drew	4,225	5.31%
Independent	Ernest Hancock (Note: Ran as a "Declaration of Independents" candidate.)	2,571	3.23%
Total votes		79,570	100.00%
Republican hold			
Republican hold			

=== District 19 ===
Primary Election Results
Party	Candidate	Votes	%
Democratic Party Primary Results
Democratic	June M. Merrill	3,647	99.13%
Democratic	Howard Lee Sprague	32	0.87%
Total votes		3,679	100.00%
Republican Party Primary Results
Republican	Nancy Wessel (incumbent)	6,220	41.26%
Republican	John C. Keegan (incumbent)	5,605	37.18%
Republican	Robert T. Cavaca	1,740	11.54%
Republican	Max Hyatt	1,510	10.02%
Total votes		15,075	100.00%
Libertarian Party Primary Results
Libertarian	Clay Adair	7	100.00%
Total votes		7	100.00%

General Election Results
Party	Candidate	Votes	%
Republican	Nancy Wessel (incumbent)	31,389	37.86%
Republican	John C. Keegan (incumbent)	27,362	33.00%
Democratic	June M. Merrill	19,279	23.25%
Libertarian	Clay Adair	4,874	5.88%
Total votes		82,904	100.00%
Republican hold			
Republican hold			

=== District 20 ===
Primary Election Results
Party	Candidate	Votes	%
Democratic Party Primary Results
Democratic	Debbie McCune-Davis (incumbent)	3,718	56.84%
Democratic	Linda D. Beezley (incumbent)	2,823	43.16%
Total votes		6,541	100.00%
Republican Party Primary Results
Republican	Robert Blendu	3,069	54.60%
Republican	Jules Dembinski	2,552	45.40%
Total votes		5,621	100.00%

General Election Results
Party	Candidate	Votes	%
Democratic	Debbie McCune-Davis (incumbent)	18,030	32.95%
Democratic	Linda D. Beezley (incumbent)	14,193	25.94%
Republican	Robert Blendu	12,755	23.31%
Republican	Jules Dembinski	9,740	17.80%
Total votes		54,718	100.00%
Democratic hold			
Democratic hold			

=== District 21 ===
Primary Election Results
Party	Candidate	Votes	%
Republican Party Primary Results
Republican	Leslie Whiting Johnson (incumbent)	6,416	33.94%
Republican	Russell Wesley Bowers	4,381	23.18%
Republican	Marilyn Jarrett	4,065	21.51%
Republican	J. David Molina	2,577	13.63%
Republican	Lindaruth Carnett Estes	1,463	7.74%
Total votes		18,902	100.00%

General Election Results
Party	Candidate	Votes	%
Republican	Leslie Whiting Johnson (incumbent)	27,957	52.28%
Republican	Russell Wesley Bowers	25,517	47.72%
Total votes		53,474	100.00%
Republican hold			
Republican hold			

=== District 22 ===
Primary Election Results
Party	Candidate	Votes	%
Democratic Party Primary Results
Democratic	Art Hamilton (incumbent)	3,428	40.49%
Democratic	Joe Eddie Lopez (incumbent)	2,744	32.41%
Democratic	Danny Peña	1,727	20.40%
Democratic	Juventino "Sookie" Charles	567	6.70%
Total votes		8,466	100.00%
Libertarian Party Primary Results
Libertarian	Tom Paswater	10	100.00%
Total votes		10	100.00%
New Alliance Party Primary Results
New Alliance	Fonz West	7	63.64%
New Alliance	Marie Mogen	4	36.36%
Total votes		11	100.00%

General Election Results
Party	Candidate	Votes	%
Democratic	Art Hamilton (incumbent)	13,457	42.71%
Democratic	Joe Eddie Lopez (incumbent)	12,209	38.75%
Libertarian	Tom Paswater	2,418	7.67%
New Alliance	Marie Mogen	2,061	6.54%
New Alliance	Fonz West	1,360	4.32%
Total votes		31,505	100.00%
Democratic hold			
Democratic hold			

=== District 23 ===
Primary Election Results
Party	Candidate	Votes	%
Democratic Party Primary Results
Democratic	Linda G. Aguirre	3,408	38.52%
Democratic	David Armstead	2,112	23.87%
Democratic	Sam Lopez	1,811	20.47%
Democratic	L. Pat Hart	1,517	17.15%
Total votes		8,848	100.00%
New Alliance Party Primary Results
New Alliance	A. Michael Lowery	3	100.00%
Total votes		3	100.00%

General Election Results
Party	Candidate	Votes	%
Democratic	Linda G. Aguirre	13,590	52.76%
Democratic	David Armstead	10,025	38.92%
New Alliance	A. Michael Lowery	2,144	8.32%
Total votes		25,759	100.00%
Democratic hold			
Democratic hold			

=== District 24 ===
Primary Election Results
Party	Candidate	Votes	%
Republican Party Primary Results
Republican	Sue Grace (incumbent)	5,372	54.61%
Republican	Ernie Baird (incumbent)	4,465	45.39%
Total votes		9,837	100.00%
Libertarian Party Primary Results
Libertarian	Gary Fallon	60	60.61%
Libertarian	Lee Crosby	39	39.39%
Total votes		99	100.00%

General Election Results
Party	Candidate	Votes	%
Republican	Sue Grace (incumbent)	32,017	42.69%
Republican	Ernie Baird (incumbent)	24,815	33.08%
Libertarian	Gary Fallon	9,292	12.39%
Libertarian	Lee Crosby	8,882	11.84%
Total votes		75,006	100.00%
Republican hold			
Republican hold			

=== District 25 ===
Primary Election Results
Party	Candidate	Votes	%
Democratic Party Primary Results
Democratic	Cathy Eden (incumbent)	4,745	54.86%
Democratic	Chris Cummiskey (incumbent)	3,905	45.14%
Total votes		8,650	100.00%
Republican Party Primary Results
Republican	Margaret Updike	5,884	100.00%
Total votes		5,884	100.00%

General Election Results
Party	Candidate	Votes	%
Democratic	Cathy Eden (incumbent)	21,993	36.09%
Democratic	Chris Cummiskey (incumbent)	20,320	33.34%
Republican	Margaret Updike	18,634	30.57%
Total votes		60,947	100.00%
Democratic hold			
Democratic hold			

=== District 26 ===
Primary Election Results
Party	Candidate	Votes	%
Democratic Party Primary Results
Democratic	Ruth Moyerman	4,454	63.62%
Democratic	Edward L. Neman	2,547	36.38%
Total votes		7,001	100.00%
Republican Party Primary Results
Republican	Greg Patterson (incumbent)	6,731	36.96%
Republican	Tom Smith (incumbent)	6,369	34.98%
Republican	Mike Arenz	5,110	28.06%
Total votes		18,210	100.00%
Libertarian Party Primary Results
Libertarian	Godfrey Daniels	35	100.00%
Total votes		35	100.00%

General Election Results
Party	Candidate	Votes	%
Republican	Greg Patterson (incumbent)	28,260	28.91%
Republican	Tom Smith (incumbent)	27,747	28.38%
Democratic	Ruth Moyerman	24,412	24.97%
Democratic	Edward L. Neman	14,171	14.50%
Libertarian	Godfrey Daniels	3,164	3.24%
Total votes		97,754	100.00%
Republican hold			
Republican hold			

=== District 27 ===
Primary Election Results
Party	Candidate	Votes	%
Democratic Party Primary Results
Democratic	Jim Driscoll	3,898	58.45%
Democratic	Frank Long	2,771	41.55%
Total votes		6,669	100.00%
Republican Party Primary Results
Republican	Gary Richardson (incumbent)	6,675	45.67%
Republican	Bob Edens	4,439	30.37%
Republican	Dan Griffin	3,503	23.97%
Total votes		14,617	100.00%
Libertarian Party Primary Results
Libertarian	Matt McNeil	17	100.00%
Total votes		17	100.00%

General Election Results
Party	Candidate	Votes	%
Republican	Gary Richardson (incumbent)	25,969	27.39%
Republican	Bob Edens	21,484	22.66%
Democratic	Jim Driscoll	20,063	21.16%
Democratic	Frank Long	19,511	20.58%
Independent	Manny Wong	5,263	5.55%
Libertarian	Matt McNeil	2,524	2.66%
Total votes		94,814	100.00%
Republican hold			
Republican hold			

=== District 28 ===
Primary Election Results
Party	Candidate	Votes	%
Republican Party Primary Results
Republican	Lisa Graham (incumbent)	8,902	54.22%
Republican	David Schweikert (incumbent)	7,515	45.78%
Total votes		16,417	100.00%

General Election Results
Party	Candidate	Votes	%
Republican	Lisa Graham (incumbent)	47,396	58.74%
Republican	David Schweikert (incumbent)	33,285	41.26%
Total votes		80,681	100.00%
Republican hold			
Republican hold			

=== District 29 ===
Primary Election Results
Party	Candidate	Votes	%
Democratic Party Primary Results
Democratic	John M. Vidourek	2,926	100.00%
Total votes		2,926	100.00%
Republican Party Primary Results
Republican	Pat Blake (incumbent)	6,359	50.33%
Republican	Lela Steffey (incumbent)	6,275	49.67%
Total votes		12,634	100.00%
Green Party Primary Results
Green	Jesse J. Chanley Jr.	11	100.00%
Total votes		11	100.00%

General Election Results
Party	Candidate	Votes	%
Republican	Pat Blake (incumbent)	22,547	36.70%
Republican	Lela Steffey (incumbent)	21,826	35.52%
Democratic	John M. Vidourek	13,233	21.54%
Green	Jesse J. Chanley Jr.	3,836	6.24%
Total votes		61,442	100.00%
Republican hold			
Republican hold			

=== District 30 ===
Primary Election Results
Party	Candidate	Votes	%
Democratic Party Primary Results
Democratic	Eileen Fellner	3,666	100.00%
Total votes		3,666	100.00%
Republican Party Primary Results
Republican	Mark W. Killian (incumbent)	9,023	60.22%
Republican	Jeff Groscost	5,960	39.78%
Total votes		14,983	100.00%
Libertarian Party Primary Results
Libertarian	Robert D. Moore	22	100.00%
Total votes		22	100.00%

General Election Results
Party	Candidate	Votes	%
Republican	Mark W. Killian (incumbent)	31,550	39.09%
Republican	Jeff Groscost	25,032	31.02%
Democratic	Eileen Fellner	19,359	23.99%
Libertarian	Robert D. Moore	4,762	5.90%
Total votes		80,703	100.00%
Republican hold			
Republican hold			
