= 1998 Arizona Senate election =

- November 3, 1998

All 30 seats of the Arizona Senate 16 seats needed for a majority
	Majority party	Minority party
Leader	Brenda Burns	Jack A. Brown
Party	Republican	Democratic
Leader's seat	17th	4th
Seats before	18	12
Seats after	16	14
Seat change	▼2	▲2
- Results: Democratic gain Republican hold Democratic hold
Senate President before election
Brenda Burns
Republican
Elected Senate President
Brenda Burns
Republican

The 1998 Arizona Senate election was held on November 3, 1998. Voters elected members of the Arizona Senate in all 30 of the state's legislative districts to serve a two-year term. Primary elections were held on September 8, 1998.

Prior to the elections, the Republicans held a majority of 18 seats over the Democrats' 12 seats.

Following the election, Republicans maintained control of the chamber with 16 Republicans to 14 Democrats, a net gain of two seats for Democrats.

The newly elected senators served in the 44th Arizona State Legislature.

== Retiring Incumbents ==
=== Democrats ===
1. District 3: James Henderson Jr.
2. District 23: Sandra Kennedy

=== Republicans ===
1. District 1: Carol Springer
2. District 5: Pat Conner
3. District 16: John Kaites
4. District 26: Tom Patterson

== Incumbent Defeated in General Election ==
=== Republican ===
1. District 27: Gary Richardson

== Summary of Results by Arizona State Legislative District ==
District	Incumbent	Party	Elected Senator	Outcome
1st	Carol Springer	Rep	Ken Bennett	Rep Hold
2nd	John Wettaw	Rep	John Wettaw	Rep Hold
3rd	James Henderson Jr.	Dem	Jack C. Jackson	Dem Hold
4th	Jack A. Brown	Dem	Jack A. Brown	Dem Hold
5th	Pat Conner	Rep	Herb Guenther	Dem Gain
6th	John Huppenthal	Rep	John Huppenthal	Rep Hold
7th	Pete Rios	Dem	Pete Rios	Dem Hold
8th	Gus Arzberger	Dem	Gus Arzberger	Dem Hold
9th	Keith A. Bee	Rep	Keith A. Bee	Rep Hold
10th	Victor Soltero	Dem	Victor Soltero	Dem Hold
11th	Elaine Richardson	Dem	Elaine Richardson	Dem Hold
12th	Ann Day	Rep	Ann Day	Rep Hold
13th	George Cunningham	Dem	George Cunningham	Dem Hold
14th	Ruth Solomon	Dem	Ruth Solomon	Dem Hold
15th	Edward J. Cirillo	Rep	Edward J. Cirillo	Rep Hold
16th	John Kaites	Rep	Darden C. Hamilton	Rep Hold
17th	Brenda Burns	Rep	Brenda Burns	Rep Hold
18th	Marc Spitzer	Rep	Marc Spitzer	Rep Hold
19th	Scott Bundgaard	Rep	Scott Bundgaard	Rep Hold
20th	Mary Hartley	Dem	Mary Hartley	Dem Hold
21st	Russell W. "Rusty" Bowers	Rep	Russell W. "Rusty" Bowers	Rep Hold
22nd	Joe Eddie Lopez	Dem	Joe Eddie Lopez	Dem Hold
23rd	Sandra Kennedy	Dem	Linda Aguirre	Dem Hold
24th	Sue Grace	Rep	Sue Grace	Rep Hold
25th	Chris Cummiskey	Dem	Chris Cummiskey	Dem Hold
26th	Tom Patterson	Rep	Tom Smith	Rep Hold
27th	Gary Richardson	Rep	Harry E. Mitchell	Dem Gain
28th	Randall Gnant	Rep	Randall Gnant	Rep Hold
29th	David Petersen	Rep	David Petersen	Rep Hold
30th	Tom Freestone	Rep	Tom Freestone	Rep Hold

== Detailed Results ==
=== District 1 ===
Democratic primary results
Party	Candidate	Votes	%
Democratic	M. Dawn Knight	4,579	100.00%
Total votes		4,579	100.00%

Republican primary results
Party	Candidate	Votes	%
Republican	Ken Bennett	8,149	41.45%
Republican	Mal Barrett	6,458	32.85%
Republican	Richard L. Hileman	5,052	25.70%
Total votes		19,659	100.00%

General election results
Party	Candidate	Votes	%
Republican	Ken Bennett	32,418	61.39%
Democratic	M. Dawn Knight	20,389	38.61%
Total votes		52,807	100.00%
Republican hold			

=== District 2 ===
Republican primary results
Party	Candidate	Votes	%
Republican	John Wettaw (incumbent)	7,249	100.00%
Total votes		7,249	100.00%

General election results
Party	Candidate	Votes	%
Republican	John Wettaw (incumbent)	26,029	100.00%
Total votes		26,029	100.00%
Republican hold			

=== District 3 ===
Democratic primary results
Party	Candidate	Votes	%
Democratic	Jack C. Jackson	3,778	46.50%
Democratic	Sharon Henderson-Jones	3,240	39.88%
Democratic	Beverly Becenti-Pigman	1,107	13.62%
Total votes		8,125	100.00%

Republican primary results
Party	Candidate	Votes	%
Republican	Lori Warring (Note: Ran as a write-in candidate in the primary election.)	315	100.00%
Total votes		315	100.00%

General election results
Party	Candidate	Votes	%
Democratic	Jack C. Jackson	21,344	73.94%
Republican	Lori Warring	7,521	26.06%
Total votes		28,865	100.00%
Democratic hold			

=== District 4 ===
Democratic primary results
Party	Candidate	Votes	%
Democratic	Jack A. Brown (incumbent)	9,120	100.00%
Total votes		9,120	100.00%

Republican primary results
Party	Candidate	Votes	%
Republican	David C. Farnsworth	6,713	100.00%
Total votes		6,713	100.00%

General election results
Party	Candidate	Votes	%
Democratic	Jack A. Brown (incumbent)	21,421	55.13%
Republican	David C. Farnsworth	17,434	44.87%
Total votes		38,855	100.00%
Democratic hold			

=== District 5 ===
Democratic primary results
Party	Candidate	Votes	%
Democratic	Herb Guenther	4,351	100.00%
Total votes		4,351	100.00%

Republican primary results
Party	Candidate	Votes	%
Republican	Larry Nelson	4,963	100.00%
Total votes		4,963	100.00%

General election results
Party	Candidate	Votes	%
Democratic	Herb Guenther	12,500	54.34%
Republican	Larry Nelson	10,503	45.66%
Total votes		23,003	100.00%
Democratic gain from Republican			

=== District 6 ===
Republican primary results
Party	Candidate	Votes	%
Republican	John Huppenthal (incumbent)	7,542	100.00%
Total votes		7,542	100.00%

General election results
Party	Candidate	Votes	%
Republican	John Huppenthal (incumbent)	31,841	100.00%
Total votes		31,841	100.00%
Republican hold			

=== District 7 ===
Democratic primary results
Party	Candidate	Votes	%
Democratic	Pete Rios (incumbent)	6,800	100.00%
Total votes		6,800	100.00%

General election results
Party	Candidate	Votes	%
Democratic	Pete Rios (incumbent)	13,170	100.00%
Total votes		13,170	100.00%
Democratic hold			

=== District 8 ===
Democratic primary results
Party	Candidate	Votes	%
Democratic	Gus Arzberger (incumbent)	7,026	100.00%
Total votes		7,026	100.00%

General election results
Party	Candidate	Votes	%
Democratic	Gus Arzberger (incumbent)	17,274	100.00%
Total votes		17,274	100.00%
Democratic hold			

=== District 9 ===
Republican primary results
Party	Candidate	Votes	%
Republican	Keith A. Bee (incumbent)	11,190	100.00%
Total votes		11,190	100.00%

General election results
Party	Candidate	Votes	%
Republican	Keith A. Bee (incumbent)	33,538	100.00%
Total votes		33,538	100.00%
Republican hold			

=== District 10 ===
Democratic primary results
Party	Candidate	Votes	%
Democratic	Victor Soltero (incumbent)	2,882	100.00%
Total votes		2,882	100.00%

General election results
Party	Candidate	Votes	%
Democratic	Victor Soltero (incumbent)	14,074	100.00%
Total votes		14,074	100.00%
Democratic hold			

=== District 11 ===
Democratic primary results
Party	Candidate	Votes	%
Democratic	Elaine Richardson (incumbent)	3,982	100.00%
Total votes		3,982	100.00%

General election results
Party	Candidate	Votes	%
Democratic	Elaine Richardson (incumbent)	17,875	100.00%
Total votes		17,875	100.00%
Democratic hold			

=== District 12 ===
Republican primary results
Party	Candidate	Votes	%
Republican	Ann Day (incumbent)	9,304	100.00%
Total votes		9,304	100.00%

Libertarian Primary Results
Party	Candidate	Votes	%
Libertarian	Ted F. Schlinkert	71	100.00%
Total votes		71	100.00%

General election results
Party	Candidate	Votes	%
Republican	Ann Day (incumbent)	39,162	86.83%
Libertarian	Ted F. Schlinkert	5,939	13.17%
Total votes		45,101	100.00%
Republican hold			

=== District 13 ===
Democratic primary results
Party	Candidate	Votes	%
Democratic	George Cunningham (incumbent)	5,334	100.00%
Total votes		5,334	100.00%

General election results
Party	Candidate	Votes	%
Democratic	George Cunningham (incumbent)	28,458	100.00%
Total votes		28,458	100.00%
Democratic hold			

=== District 14 ===
Democratic primary results
Party	Candidate	Votes	%
Democratic	Ruth Solomon (incumbent)	4,113	100.00%
Total votes		4,113	100.00%

Libertarian Primary Results
Party	Candidate	Votes	%
Libertarian	Jon Hoffman	40	100.00%
Total votes		40	100.00%

General election results
Party	Candidate	Votes	%
Democratic	Ruth Solomon (incumbent)	22,792	80.47%
Libertarian	Jon Hoffman	5,530	19.53%
Total votes		28,322	100.00%
Democratic hold			

=== District 15 ===
Republican primary results
Party	Candidate	Votes	%
Republican	Edward J. Cirillo (incumbent)	10,111	100.00%
Total votes		10,111	100.00%

General election results
Party	Candidate	Votes	%
Republican	Edward J. Cirillo (incumbent)	33,150	100.00%
Total votes		33,150	100.00%
Republican hold			

=== District 16 ===
Democratic primary results
Party	Candidate	Votes	%
Democratic	Stan Furman	2,057	100.00%
Total votes		2,057	100.00%

Republican primary results
Party	Candidate	Votes	%
Republican	Darden C. Hamilton	5,058	100.00%
Total votes		5,058	100.00%

General election results
Party	Candidate	Votes	%
Republican	Darden C. Hamilton	14,991	53.16%
Democratic	Stan Furman	13,211	46.84%
Total votes		28,202	100.00%
Republican hold			

=== District 17 ===
Democratic primary results
Party	Candidate	Votes	%
Democratic	Ruben Madrid	137	100.00%
Total votes		137	100.00%

Republican primary results
Party	Candidate	Votes	%
Republican	Brenda Burns (incumbent)	7,926	100.00%
Total votes		7,926	100.00%

General election results
Party	Candidate	Votes	%
Republican	Brenda Burns (incumbent)	25,855	100.00%
Total votes		25,855	100.00%
Republican hold			

=== District 18 ===
Democratic primary results
Party	Candidate	Votes	%
Democratic	Oscar F. Vargas	20	100.00%
Total votes		20	100.00%

Republican primary results
Party	Candidate	Votes	%
Republican	Marc Spitzer (incumbent)	9,573	100.00%
Total votes		9,573	100.00%

General election results
Party	Candidate	Votes	%
Republican	Marc Spitzer (incumbent)	25,481	100.00%
Total votes		25,481	100.00%
Republican hold			

=== District 19 ===
Republican primary results
Party	Candidate	Votes	%
Republican	Scott Bundgaard (incumbent)	10,369	100.00%
Total votes		10,369	100.00%

General election results
Party	Candidate	Votes	%
Republican	Scott Bundgaard (incumbent)	33,266	100.00%
Total votes		33,266	100.00%
Republican hold			

=== District 20 ===
Democratic primary results
Party	Candidate	Votes	%
Democratic	Mary Hartley (incumbent)	2,122	100.00%
Total votes		2,122	100.00%

General election results
Party	Candidate	Votes	%
Democratic	Mary Hartley (incumbent)	12,493	100.00%
Total votes		12,493	100.00%
Democratic hold			

=== District 21 ===
Republican primary results
Party	Candidate	Votes	%
Republican	Russell W. Bowers (incumbent)	7,915	100.00%
Total votes		7,915	100.00%

General election results
Party	Candidate	Votes	%
Republican	Russell W. "Rusty" Bowers (incumbent)	27,212	100.00%
Total votes		27,212	100.00%
Republican hold			

=== District 22 ===
Democratic primary results
Party	Candidate	Votes	%
Democratic	Joe Eddie Lopez (incumbent)	3,158	100.00%
Total votes		3,158	100.00%

Republican primary results
Party	Candidate	Votes	%
Republican	Mary Raseley	956	100.00%
Total votes		956	100.00%

General election results
Party	Candidate	Votes	%
Democratic	Joe Eddie Lopez (incumbent)	7,322	69.09%
Republican	Mary Raseley	3,276	30.91%
Total votes		10,598	100.00%
Democratic hold			

=== District 23 ===
Democratic primary results
Party	Candidate	Votes	%
Democratic	Linda Aguirre	2,207	55.89%
Democratic	David Armstead	1,742	44.11%
Total votes		3,949	100.00%

Republican primary results
Party	Candidate	Votes	%
Republican	Maurice Ward	845	100.00%
Total votes		845	100.00%

General election results
Party	Candidate	Votes	%
Democratic	Linda Aguirre	8,142	70.50%
Republican	Maurice "Morris" Ward	3,406	29.49%
Independent	Bradley Cashman (Note: Ran as a write-in candidate in the general election.)	1	0.01%
Total votes		11,549	100.00%
Democratic hold			

=== District 24 ===
Democratic primary results
Party	Candidate	Votes	%
Democratic	Jeff Bollerman	1,994	100.00%
Total votes		1,994	100.00%

Republican primary results
Party	Candidate	Votes	%
Republican	Sue Grace (incumbent)	6,459	100.00%
Total votes		6,459	100.00%

Libertarian Primary Results
Party	Candidate	Votes	%
Libertarian	Gary Fallon	50	100.00%
Total votes		50	100.00%

General election results
Party	Candidate	Votes	%
Republican	Sue Grace (incumbent)	22,988	63.51%
Democratic	Jeff Bollerman	10,653	29.43%
Libertarian	Gary Fallon	2,553	7.05%
Total votes		36,194	100.00%
Republican hold			

=== District 25 ===
Democratic primary results
Party	Candidate	Votes	%
Democratic	Chris Cummiskey (incumbent)	2,988	100.00%
Total votes		2,988	100.00%

General election results
Party	Candidate	Votes	%
Democratic	Chris Cummiskey (incumbent)	18,772	100.00%
Total votes		18,772	100.00%
Democratic hold			

=== District 26 ===
Democratic primary results
Party	Candidate	Votes	%
Democratic	Bodo Diehn	2,161	100.00%
Total votes		2,161	100.00%

Republican primary results
Party	Candidate	Votes	%
Republican	Tom Smith	7,086	60.88%
Republican	Robin Shaw	4,553	39.12%
Total votes		11,639	100.00%

General election results
Party	Candidate	Votes	%
Republican	Tom Smith	22,801	66.48%
Democratic	Bodo Diehn	11,497	33.52%
Total votes		34,298	100.00%
Republican hold			

=== District 27 ===
Democratic primary results
Party	Candidate	Votes	%
Democratic	Harry E. Mitchell	2,283	100.00%
Total votes		2,283	100.00%

Republican primary results
Party	Candidate	Votes	%
Republican	Gary Richardson (incumbent)	6,312	100.00%
Total votes		6,312	100.00%

General election results
Party	Candidate	Votes	%
Democratic	Harry E. Mitchell	18,930	55.42%
Republican	Gary Richardson (incumbent)	15,230	44.58%
Total votes		34,160	100.00%
Democratic gain from Republican			

=== District 28 ===
Republican primary results
Party	Candidate	Votes	%
Republican	Randall Gnant (incumbent)	7,002	52.39%
Republican	David Burnell Smith	6,362	47.61%
Total votes		13,364	100.00%

General election results
Party	Candidate	Votes	%
Republican	Randall Gnant (incumbent)	44,250	100.00%
Total votes		44,250	100.00%
Republican hold			

=== District 29 ===
Democratic primary results
Party	Candidate	Votes	%
Democratic	Edward Gaudreau	1,171	100.00%
Total votes		1,171	100.00%

Republican primary results
Party	Candidate	Votes	%
Republican	David Petersen (incumbent)	4,552	79.78%
Republican	Brigham Russell	1,154	20.22%
Total votes		5,706	100.00%

General election results
Party	Candidate	Votes	%
Republican	David Petersen (incumbent)	13,729	67.86%
Democratic	Edward Gaudreau	6,501	32.14%
Total votes		20,230	100.00%
Republican hold			

=== District 30 ===
Republican primary results
Party	Candidate	Votes	%
Republican	Tom Freestone (incumbent)	10,050	100.00%
Total votes		10,050	100.00%

General election results
Party	Candidate	Votes	%
Republican	Tom Freestone (incumbent)	38,122	100.00%
Total votes		38,122	100.00%
Republican hold			
