= Dean Martin (politician) =

American politician

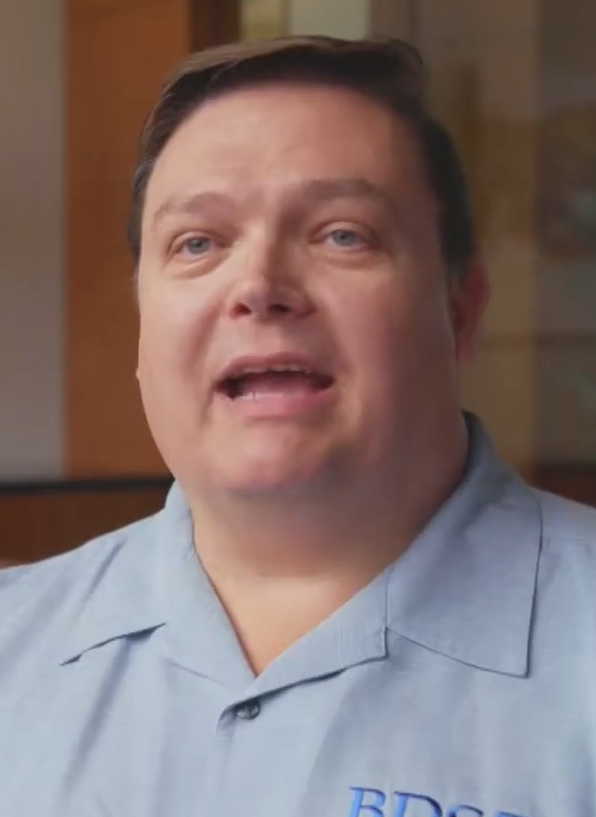
- Martin in 2022

41st Treasurer of Arizona
- In office January 2007 – January 2011
- Governor: Janet Napolitano; Jan Brewer
- Preceded by: Elliott Hibbs
- Succeeded by: Doug Ducey

Member of the Arizona Senate from the 6th district
- In office January 2003 – January 2007
- Preceded by: Lori Daniels
- Succeeded by: Pamela Gorman

Member of the Arizona Senate from the 24th district
- In office January 2001 – January 2003
- Preceded by: Sue Grace
- Succeeded by: Herb Guenther

Personal details
- Party: Republican
- Spouse: Kerry Martin (m. 1995; died 2009)

Dean Martin was the Arizona State Treasurer from 2007 to 2011. A member of the Republican Party, he defeated the Democratic Party candidate, Rano Singh, in the 2006 general election. Previously, Martin had been a member of the Arizona Senate.

== Education ==
Martin graduated from Arizona State University with a degree in small business management and entrepreneurship.

== Arizona senate ==
As a member of the Arizona Senate, Martin's first piece of legislation was "Chris' Law" which prevents child predators from posting bail. This bill was inspired by a 12-year-old student named Chris Cottrell. The bill became Prop 103 "Chris' Law". It passed in 2002 with 80.4% of the vote. While in the Senate, Martin served as chairman of the senate finance committee.

== Arizona treasurer ==
Martin was elected Arizona state treasurer in 2006 and assumed office, in January 2007. As treasurer, Martin also served as the chairman of the Board of Investment and Loan Commission, as the surveyor general and on the Land Selection Board. As treasurer, Martin was second in line of succession to the governor, since incumbent Arizona secretary of state Ken Bennett was appointed and not elected to office.

== 2010 gubernatorial campaign ==
Martin announced his bid for governor of Arizona, on January 11, 2010. Polling done on January 25, 2010, by Rasmussen Reports had Martin narrowly leading incumbent governor and fellow Republican Jan Brewer 31% to 29% in a hypothetical Republican primary. As of March 23, 2010, Rasmussen showed Martin leading presumed Democratic nominee Arizona attorney general Terry Goddard, 43% to 38%, in a hypothetical general election match up. Martin suspended his campaign for governor, on July 9, 2010. By then Brewer had garnered national attention after signing anti- illegal immigration legislation, Senate Bill 1070.

== Personal life ==
Martin married his wife Kerry in 1995. She died on May 25, 2009, of complications from childbirth four hours after giving birth to a son, Austin Michael Martin, who died two days later. Martin subsequently established Martin Charities to continue his wife's charitable efforts in water safety and financial literacy.

Arizona Senate
Preceded by Sue Grace	Member of the Arizona Senate from the 24th district 2001–2003	Succeeded by Herb Guenther
Preceded by Lori Daniels	Member of the Arizona Senate from the 6th district 2003–2007	Succeeded by Pamela Gorman
Political offices
Preceded by Elliott Hibbs	Treasurer of Arizona; 2007–201`	Succeeded by Doug Ducey
