= Senator Aguirre =

Senator Aguirre may refer to:

- Amanda Aguirre (born 1953), Arizona State Senate
- Linda Aguirre (born 1951), Arizona State Senate
