= Senator Bee =

Senator Bee may refer to:

- Carlos Bee (1867–1932), Texas State Senate
- Keith A. Bee (born 1965), Arizona State Senate
- Keith Bee (fl. 1990s–2000s), Arizona State Senate
- Thomas Bee (1739–1812), South Carolina State Senate
- Tim Bee (fl. 2000s), Arizona State Senate
