= Robin Shaw =

American politician

Member of the Arizona House of Representatives from the 26th district
- In office January 1994 – January 1998 Serving with Tom Smith
- Preceded by: Greg Patterson
- Succeeded by: Steve May

Personal details
- Party: Republican

Robin Shaw is an American politician. From 1994 to 1998, she was a member of the Arizona House of Representatives from the 26th legislative district.

== Life ==
Shaw is a small business owner and worked on the Arizona Committee for the Arts. She is a member of the Arizona Federation of GOP Women. In the 1994 Arizona House of Representatives election, Shaw was elected for the 26th legislative district to succeed Greg Patterson who retired to run for Arizona Corporation Commission. She was chair of the commerce committee and a member of the banking and insurance, block grants, and economic development, international trade and tourism committees. Shaw ran in the 1998 Arizona Senate election for district 26, losing to fellow representative Tom Smith.

During the 2024 United States presidential election in Arizona, Shaw and Mesa mayor John Giles were co-chairing the state chapter of Republicans for Harris.

== Electoral history ==
1994 Arizona House of Representatives District 26 primary election results
Party	Candidate	Votes	%
Republican Party Primary Results
Republican	Tom Smith (incumbent)	6,772	30.06%
Republican	Robin Shaw	5,438	24.14%
Republican	Mike Arenz	5,247	23.29%
Republican	James J. "Jim" Lemmon	2,960	13.14%
Republican	Terry Zajac	2,113	9.38%
Total votes		22,530	100.00%
Democratic Party Primary Results
Democratic	Manuel V. "Manny" Cisneros	6,155	100.00%
Total votes		6,155	100.00%
Libertarian Party Primary Results
Libertarian	Mike Trueblood (Note: The candidate ran a write-in campaign.)	4	100.00%
Total votes		4	100.00%

1994 Arizona House of Representatives District 26 general election results
Party	Candidate	Votes	%
Republican	Robin Shaw	24,986	36.67%
Republican	Tom Smith (incumbent)	24,006	35.23%
Democratic	Manuel V. "Manny" Cisneros	14,106	20.70%
Libertarian	Mike Trueblood	5,040	7.40%
Total votes		68,138	100.00%
Republican hold			
Republican hold			

1996 Arizona House of Representatives District 26 primary election results
Party	Candidate	Votes	%
Republican Party Primary Results
Republican	Robin Shaw (incumbent)	5,850	39.04%
Republican	Tom Smith (incumbent)	5,105	34.07%
Republican	John R. Mills	4,029	26.89%
Total votes		14,984	100.00%
Democratic Party Primary Results
Democratic	Karen Hofmeister	3,189	59.34%
Democratic	Billy Wrye	2,185	40.66%
Total votes		5,374	100.00%

1996 Arizona House of Representatives District 26 general election results
Party	Candidate	Votes	%
Republican	Robin Shaw (incumbent)	28,985	32.03%
Republican	Tom Smith (incumbent)	27,166	30.02%
Democratic	Karen Hofmeister	19,461	21.51%
Democratic	Billy Wrye	14,881	16.44%
Total votes		90,493	100.00%
Republican hold			
Republican hold			

1998 Arizona Senate District 26 Republican primary election results
Party	Candidate	Votes	%
Republican	Tom Smith	7,086	60.88%
Republican	Robin Shaw	4,553	39.12%
Total votes		11,639	100.00%
