= Carmen Cajero =

American politician (1915–2007)

Member of the Arizona House of Representatives from the 10th district
- In office 1973–1996
- Preceded by: Bernardo Cajero

Personal details
- Born: October 28, 1915 Morenci, Arizona, U.S.
- Died: April 1, 2007 (aged 91) Tucson, Arizona, U.S.
- Party: Democratic

Carmen Fernandez Cajero (October 28, 1915 – April 1, 2007) was an American politician in the state of Arizona. She served in the Arizona House of Representatives between 1973 and 1996, taking over as the representative for the 10th district following her husband's death.

== Early life ==
Cajero was born Carmen Fernandez on October 28, 1915, in Morenci, Arizona. Her parents were Adolpho and Aja Gabina Fernandez. She graduated from Morenci High School and then married Bernardo M. Cajero. The couple moved to Tucson and had two children: Olivia Cajero Bedford and Monica Cajero. She worked for the school lunch program with the Tucson School District and as a clerk with the Department of Motor Vehicles.

== Political career ==
In 1968, her husband was elected to the Arizona House of Representatives and she would go with him to Phoenix while the legislature was in session. He died unexpectedly on January 14, 1973, and Cajero was appointed to finish his legislative term. She took the oath of office as the representative for the 10th district on January 29, 1973. She was re-elected until she retired in 1996. She was a Democrat in a predominately Republican legislature, serving as the minority whip in the 35th legislature. Inspired by her husband's time as president of the parent-teacher association of Pueblo High School, when he would visit students to ask why they had dropped out of the school, she sponsored legislation to end the requirement for students in Arizona to pay for their own textbooks. In 1984, Governor Bruce Babbitt called for the funding to be provided for her proposal and she won the support of House Majority Leader Burton Barr, who became a co-sponsor.

She was a member of the House Appropriations Committee and, in this role, focused on protecting the University of Arizona in budget negotiations. Cajero also helped to create the first bone marrow program in Arizona at the University of Arizona's College of Medicine, inspired by the story of two local twins, Kevin and Chris Singleton, who had to travel out of state to donate bone marrow. She was a member of the National Order of Women Legislators, the Democrats of Greater Tucson and the Alcoholism Council of Tucson.

== Death ==
Cajero died on April 1, 2007, in Tucson.
