= Lou-Ann Preble =

American politician (1929–2024)

Member of the Arizona House of Representatives from the 9th district
- In office January 1993 – January 2001
- Preceded by: Keith Bee; Marion L. Pickens
- Succeeded by: Randy Graf; Marian McClure

Personal details
- Born: Lou-Ann Maxin Baumann; September 26, 1929 Sumter, South Carolina, U.S.
- Died: May 2, 2024 (aged 94) Tucson, Arizona, U.S.
- Party: Republican
- Spouse: William
- Children: 11
- Profession: Politician

Lou-Ann Maxine Preble (née Baumann; September 26, 1929 – May 2, 2024) was an American politician who was a member of the Arizona House of Representatives. She served in the House from January 1993 through January 2001, representing district 9. She could not run for re-election in 2000 due to the amendment to the Arizona Constitution which limited politicians to serving four consecutive terms. Preble died on May 2, 2024, at the age of 94.
