= Herb Guenther =

American politician (1941–2021)

Member of the Arizona Senate from the 5th district
- In office January 1999 – January 2003
- Preceded by: Pat Conner

Member of the Arizona House of Representatives from the 5th district
- In office January 1987 – January 1993
- Preceded by: Frank McElhaney
- Succeeded by: Pat Conner

Personal details
- Born: April 9, 1941 Mineola, New York, U.S.
- Died: December 17, 2021 (aged 80) Castle Rock, Colorado, U.S.
- Party: Democratic
- Spouse: Sharon
- Profession: Politician

Herb Guenther (April 9, 1941 – December 17, 2021) was an American politician who was a member of both the Arizona House of Representatives and the Arizona State Senate. He served in the House from January 1987 until January 1993. He was first elected to the House in November 1986, representing District 5, and was re-elected in 1990 and 1992. In 1998 he ran for the Arizona Senate, and was elected, representing District 5. He won re-election to the Senate in 2000, but did not run for re-election in 2002. He died on December 17, 2021, at the age of 80.
