= Mark Killian =

American politician

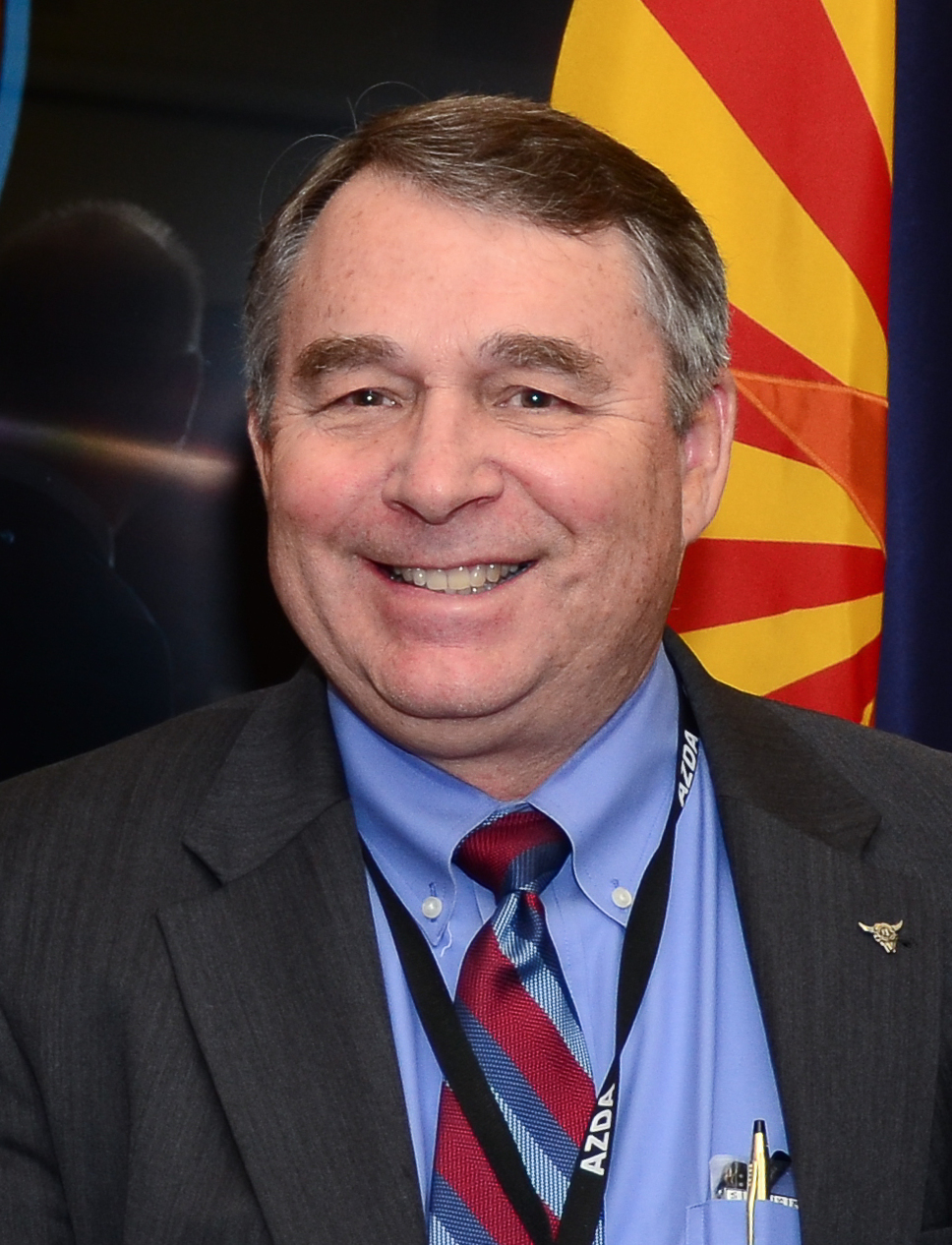
- Killian in 2018

Director of the Arizona Department of Agriculture
- In office April 10, 2015 – January 2, 2023
- Preceded by: Donald Butler
- Succeeded by: Paul Brierley

Speaker of the Arizona House of Representatives
- In office January 1, 1993 – December 31, 1997

Member of the Arizona House of Representatives from the 30th district
- In office January 1, 1983 – December 31, 1997
- Preceded by: Carl Kunasek
- Succeeded by: Karen Johnson

Personal details
- Party: Republican
- Education: Arizona State University

Mark Killian is an American politician and the former director of the Arizona Department of Agriculture. Killian is a former Republican state representative and speaker of the Arizona House of Representatives.

== Biography ==
Killian earned his BS in business administration from Arizona State University. From 1997 until 2003 Killian served as the Director of the Arizona Department of Revenue. In 2010 Killian was appointed by then governor Jan Brewer to the Arizona Board of Regents.

During his 5-year term on the Board of Regents, Killian made headlines when he suggested the board sue the state for violating a clause in the state Constitution that says education should be "as nearly free as possible."
