= Barry Wong (politician) =

American politician

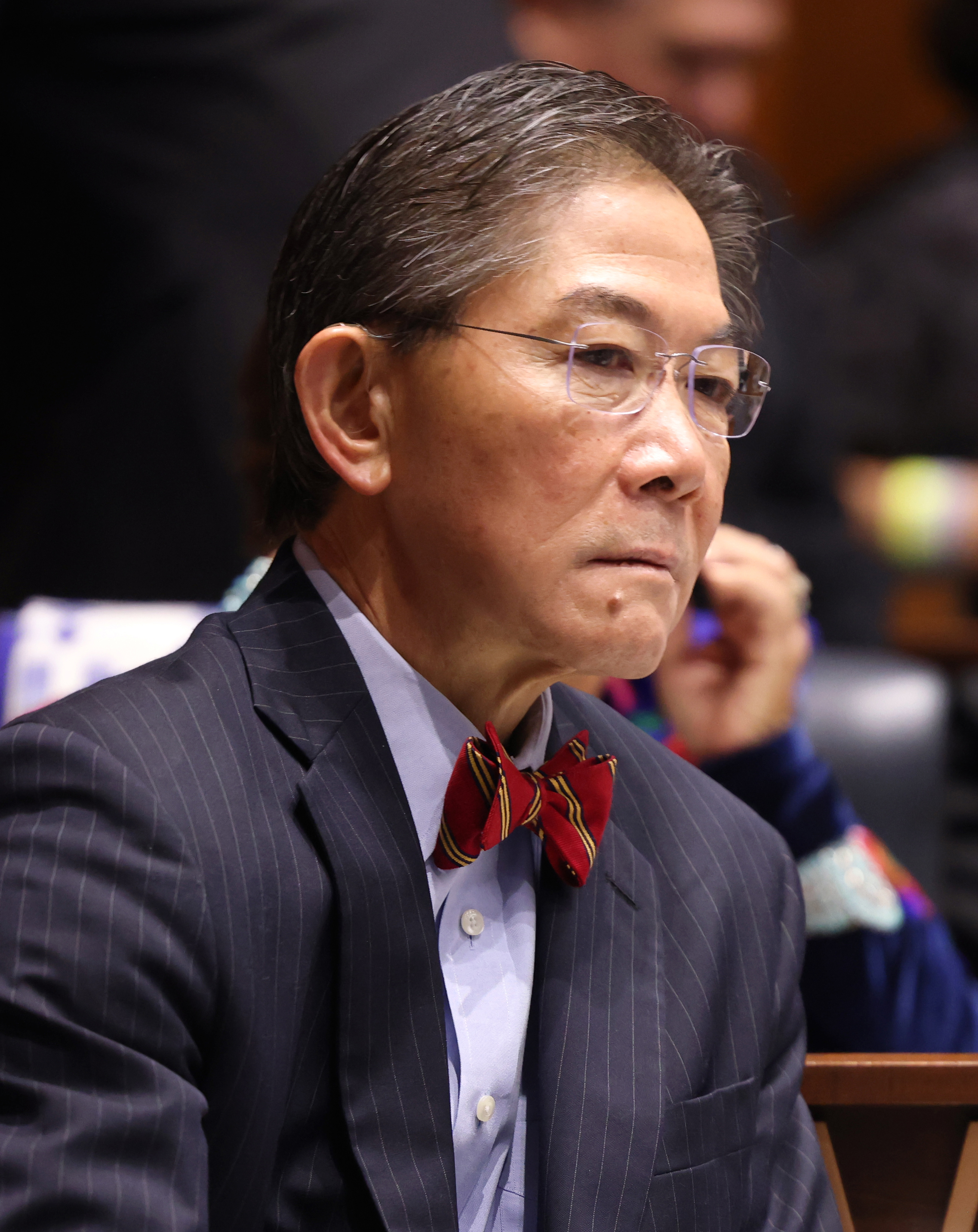

Arizona Corporation Commission
- In office July 2006 – January 2, 2008

Member of the Arizona House of Representatives from the 18th district
- In office 1993–2001

Personal details
- Party: Republican
- Education: Arizona State University
- Occupation: Lawyer

Barry Wong is a Republican attorney and politician who previously served on the Arizona Corporation Commission and as a member of the Arizona House of Representatives representing the 18th district.

== Education ==
Wong graduated from Arizona State University with a bachelor's degree in accounting, from the University of Arizona School of Law and from the Thunderbird School of Global Management.

== Career ==
In July 2006, Governor Janet Napolitano appointed Wong to fill the vacancy on the Arizona Corporation Commission created when Marc Spitzer was named to the Federal Energy Regulatory Commission.

== Elections ==
In 1994, Wong and Susan Gerard defeated Libertarians Richard Rupert and Chris Wilcoxson in the general election.

In 1996, Wong and Gerard defeated Democrat Ray Villa in the general election.

In 1998, Wong and Gerard were unopposed in the general election.

In 2008, Wong ran for a full term on the Corporation commission receiving 895,418 votes, losing the general election to Democrats Sandra Kennedy, Paul Newman and Republican Bob Stump.
