= Pat Conner =

American politician

Member of the Arizona Senate from the 5th district
- In office January 1997 – January 1999
- Preceded by: Jim Buster
- Succeeded by: Herb Guenther

Personal details
- Party: Republican
- Profession: Politician

Pat Conner is a former member of the Arizona State Senate. He served a single term in the Senate from January 1997 through January 1999, representing district 5. He did not run for re-election in 2000.
