= Lori Daniels =

American politician

Member of the Arizona Senate from the 6th district
- In office January 2001 – January 2003
- Preceded by: John Huppenthal

Personal details
- Born: November 5, 1955 (age 70) Burlingame, California
- Party: Republican
- Spouse: Peter
- Children: Ashley
- Profession: Politician

Lori Daniels (born November 5, 1955) is a former member of the Arizona State Senate. She served in the Senate from January 2001 until January 2003. She ran for re-election in 2002, but lost in the primary to Slade Mead, who would go on to win in the general election.
