= Jack Jackson Sr. =

American politician

Member of the Arizona Senate
- In office 1998–2004

Member of the Arizona House of Representatives
- In office 1985–1998

Personal details
- Born: September 14, 1933 Leupp, Arizona, United States
- Died: March 5, 2023 (aged 89)
- Party: Democratic
- Spouse: Eloise
- Occupation: Educator, rancher

Jack C. Jackson Sr. (September 14, 1933 – March 5, 2023) was an American politician who served in the Arizona Senate and Arizona House of Representatives. He was a Navajo. He was the father of Jack Jackson Jr., also a state politician in Arizona.

Jackson died on March 5, 2023, at the age of 89.
