= John Kaites =

American politician

Member of the Arizona Senate from the 16th district
- In office 1994–1999

Member of the Arizona House of Representatives from the 16th district
- In office 1993–1994

Personal details
- Born: April 1, 1963 (age 63) Johnstown, Pennsylvania
- Party: Republican

John Kaites (born April 1, 1963) is an American politician and a former member of the Arizona State Legislature and a lobbyist working in the state of Arizona. In addition to his time in the legislature, Kaites also worked as an assistant attorney general for the State of Arizona and as a prosecutor for Maricopa County.

== Education ==
Kaites earned his BA from Allegheny College in 1985 and his JD from Duquesne University School of Law in 1990.

== Career ==
Kaites is currently of counsel at the Phoenix law firm Fennemore Craig. In 2011, Kaites attempted to purchase the Phoenix Coyotes. he also serves on the Whitworth University Board of Trustees. In 2019, Kaites applied for the vacant position of Maricopa County Attorney, but the position went to Allister Adel.

== Attorney General race ==
Kaites ran for Arizona Attorney General in 1998, losing in the Republican primary to Tom McGovern after running controversial advertisements against McGovern.
