= George Cunningham (Arizona politician) =

American politician

Member of the Arizona Senate from the 13th district
- In office January 13, 1997 – January 8, 2001
- Preceded by: Patricia Noland
- Succeeded by: Andy Nichols

Member of the Arizona House of Representatives from the 13th district
- In office January 11, 1993 – January 13, 1997
- Preceded by: Eleanor D. Schorr
- Succeeded by: Brian Fagin

Personal details
- Born: February 15, 1945 (age 81) Nashua, New Hampshire
- Party: Democratic

George Cunningham (born February 15, 1945) is an American Democratic politician who served in the Arizona House of Representatives from the 13th district from 1993 to 1997 and in the Arizona Senate from the 13th district from 1997 to 2001. Cunningham is a Fellow of the National Academy of Public Administration.
