= Elaine Richardson (politician) =

American politician (born 1940)

Member of the Arizona Senate from the 11th district
- In office January 13, 1997 – January 13, 2003
- Preceded by: Peter Goudinoff
- Succeeded by: Barbara Leff

Member of the Arizona House of Representatives from the 11th district
- In office January 11, 1993 – January 13, 1997
- Preceded by: Peter Goudinoff
- Succeeded by: Debora Norris

Personal details
- Born: September 23, 1940 (age 85) Providence, Rhode Island
- Party: Democratic

Elaine Richardson (born September 23, 1940) is an American politician who served in the Arizona House of Representatives from the 11th district from 1993 to 1997 and in the Arizona Senate from the 11th district from 1997 to 2003. She ran for Arizona's 7th congressional district in 2002, but lost the Democratic primary to Raúl Grijalva.
