= Sue Grace =

American politician

Member of the Arizona Senate from the 24th district
- In office January 1997 – January 2001
- Preceded by: John Greene
- Succeeded by: Dean Martin

Member of the Arizona House of Representatives from the 24th district
- In office January 1991 – January 1997
- Preceded by: Chris Herstam
- Succeeded by: Tom Horne; Barbara Leff

Personal details
- Born: January 31, 1958 (age 68) Milwaukee, Wisconsin
- Party: Republican
- Spouse: Vic
- Profession: Politician

Sue Grace (born January 31, 1958) is a former member of the Arizona House of Representatives and the Arizona State Senate. She served in the house from January 1991 through January 1997, and then in the Senate from January 1997 through January 2001.
