= Joe Eddie Lopez =

American politician (born 1939)

Member of the Arizona Senate from the 22nd district
- In office January 1997 – January 2003
- Preceded by: Manuel Pena
- Succeeded by: Thayer Verschoor

Member of the Arizona House of Representatives from the 22nd district
- In office January 1991 – January 1997
- Preceded by: Earl V. Wilcox
- Succeeded by: John Loredo

Personal details
- Born: December 8, 1939 (age 86) Duran, New Mexico, U.S.
- Party: Democratic
- Spouse: Rose Marie
- Children: Debbie, Eddie
- Profession: Politician

Joe Eddie Lopez (born December 8, 1939) is a former member of both the Arizona State Senate and the Arizona House of Representatives. He served in the House from January 1989 until January 2001, and in the Senate from January 2001 through January 2003. She was first elected to the House in November 1990, representing District 22, and was re-elected in 1992 and 1994. In 1996 he ran for the State Senate from the district, and won. He was re-elected in 1998 and 2000. He did not run for re-election in 2002.
