= Linda Aguirre =

American politician (born 1951)

Member of the Arizona Senate from the 23rd district
- In office January 1999 – January 2003
- Preceded by: Sandra Kennedy

Member of the Arizona Senate from the 16th district
- In office January 2003 – January 2007
- Succeeded by: Leah Landrum Taylor

Member of the Arizona House of Representatives from the 23rd district
- In office January 1993 – January 1999

Personal details
- Born: July 12, 1951 (age 75) Flagstaff, Arizona, U.S.
- Party: Democratic
- Spouse: John
- Children: Eric, Stephanie
- Profession: Politician

Linda Aguirre (born July 12, 1951) is a former member of the Arizona State Senate and the Arizona House of Representatives, initially representing the 23rd District before redistricting in 2002 moved her to the 16th District. She was first elected to the House in November 1992. She won re-election to the House in 1994 and 1996.

In 1998, she ran for the State Senate in the same district and won the seat. She won re-election in 2000, 2002, and 2004. Due to Arizona term limits, she was ineligible to run for re-election in 2006.
