= Tom Smith (Arizona politician) =

American politician (1927–2014)

Member of the Arizona Senate from the 26th district
- In office January 1999 – January 2003
- Preceded by: Tom Patterson

Member of the Arizona House of Representatives from the 26th district
- In office January 1993 – January 1999
- Preceded by: Jim Meredith
- Succeeded by: Jeff Hatch-Miller; Steve May

Personal details
- Born: March 16, 1927 St. Paul, Minnesota
- Died: May 25, 2014 (aged 87)
- Party: Republican
- Spouse: Sarah Jane
- Profession: Politician

Thomas C. Smith (March 16, 1927 – May 25, 2014) was a member of both the Arizona State Senate and the Arizona House of Representatives. He served in the House from January 1993 until January 1999, and in the Senate from January 1999 through January 2003. He was first elected to the House in November 1992, representing District 26, and was re-elected in 1994 and 1996. In 1998 he ran for the State Senate from the same district, and won. He was re-elected in 2000. He did not run for re-election in 2002.
