= 2026 Arizona Senate election =

2026 election in Arizona, United States

- November 3, 2026

All 30 seats of the Arizona Senate 16 seats needed for a majority
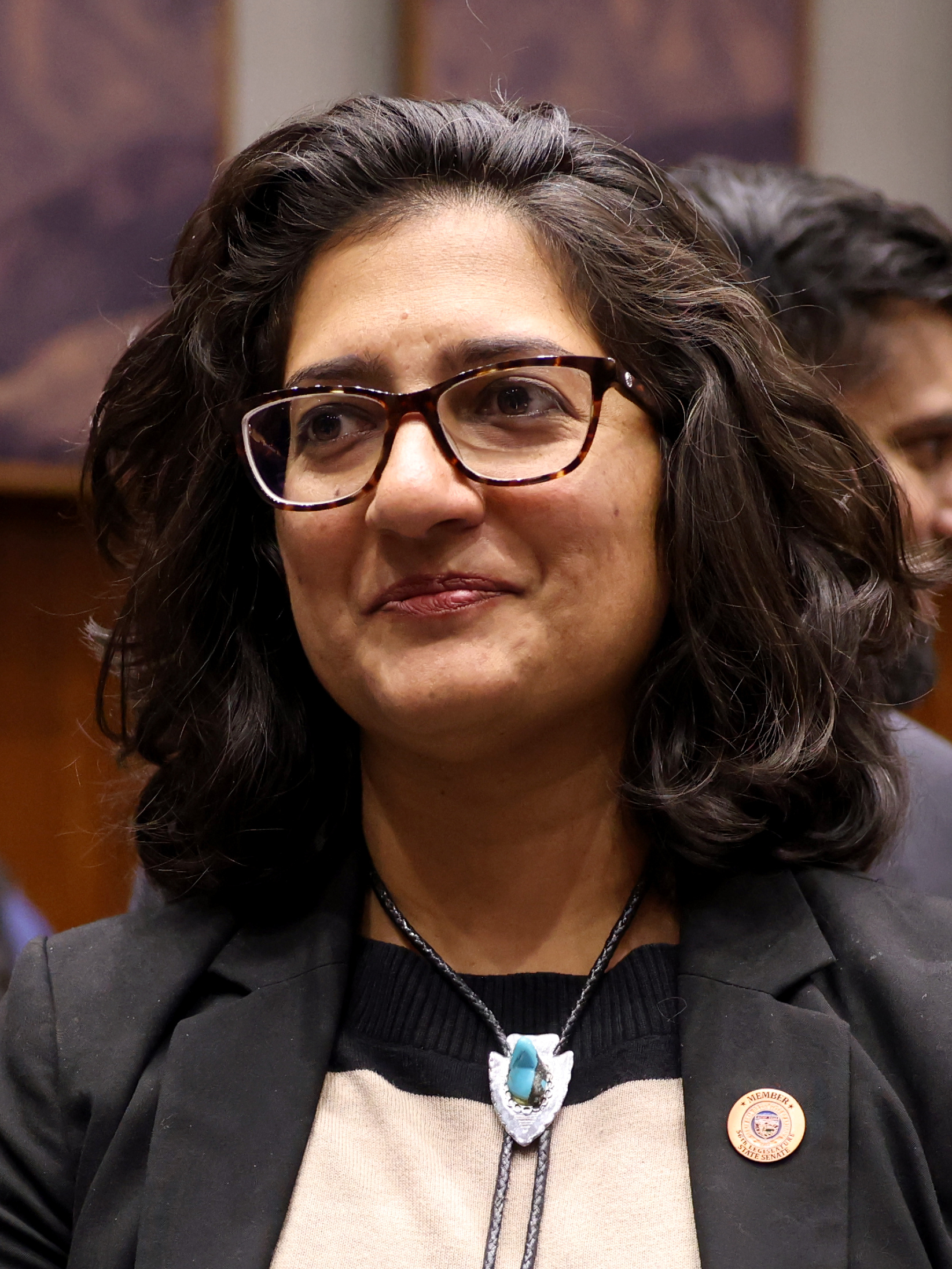

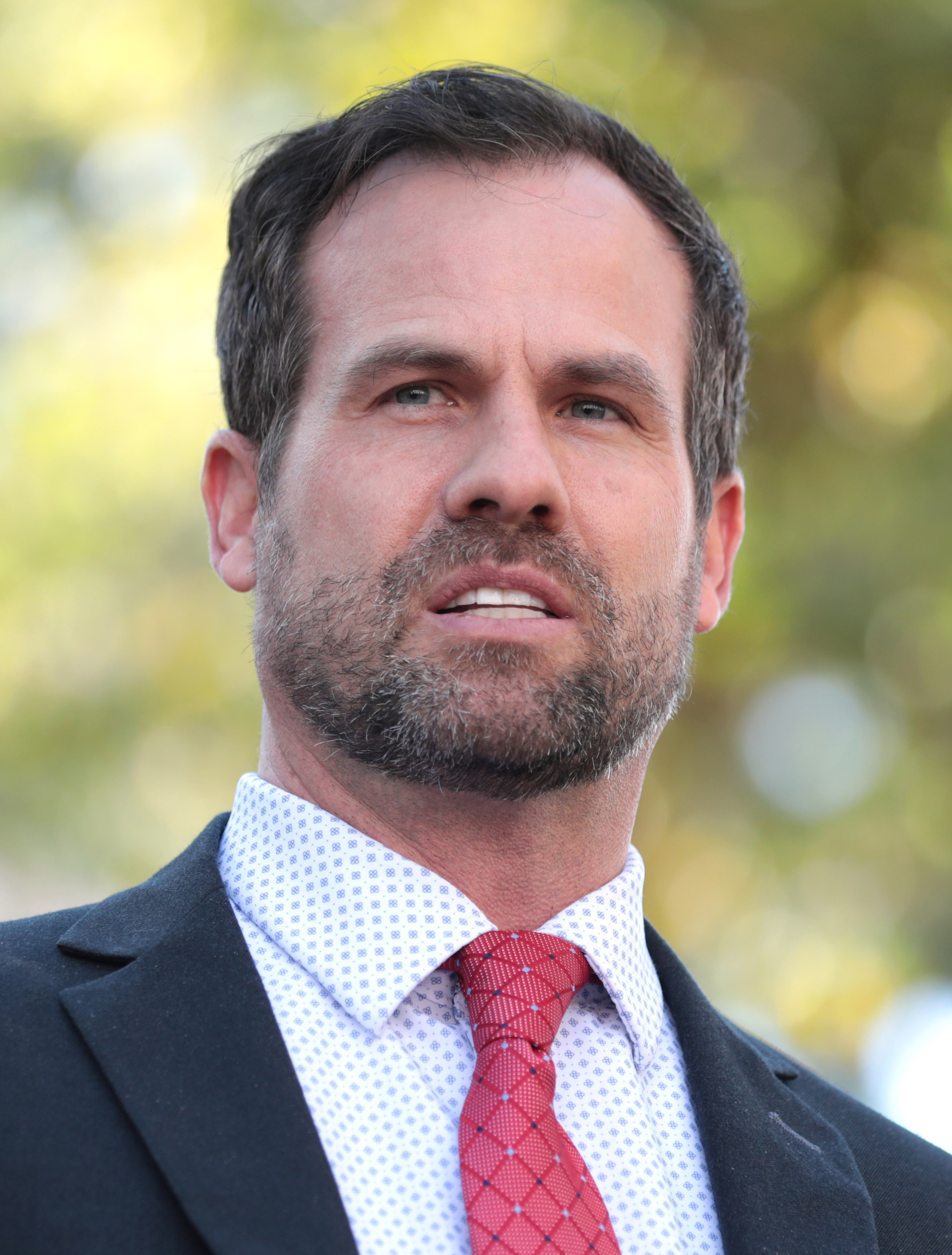
	Majority party	Minority party
Leader	Priya Sundareshan	Warren Petersen (retiring)
Party	Democratic	Republican
Leader since	January 13, 2025	January 9, 2023
Leader's seat	18th–Tucson	14th–Gilbert
Last election	13 seats, 46.33%	17 seats, 53.40%
Seats before	13	17
Seats after	20	10
Seat change	▲7	▼7
Popular vote	1,339,672	1,079,114
Percentage	54.5%	43.9%
Swing	▲8.2%	▼9.5%
- Results: Republican hold Republican gain Democratic hold Democratic gain
President of the Senate before election
Warren Petersen
Republican
Elected President of the Senate
Democratic

The 2026 Arizona Senate election was held on November 3, 2026. Voters elected members of the Arizona Senate in all 30 of the state's legislative districts to serve a two-year term. Primary elections were held on July 21, 2026.

Prior to the election, the Republican Party held a majority over the Democratic Party, controlling 17 seats to the latter's 13 seats.

Democrats were able to flip the chamber, which, combined with winning the Arizona House of Representatives, gave them their first trifecta in the state since 1966. In flipping 7 seats in the Senate, Democrats won a supermajority of 20 seats to Republicans' 10.

== Background ==
=== Partisan background ===
In the 2024 presidential election, Donald Trump won 17 districts, while Kamala Harris won 13. In the previous election in 2024, the Republican Party increased its margin by one seat, with a total of 17 seats, compared to the 13 seats held by the Democratic Party.

Harris 40–50% 50–60% 60–70% 70–80% / Trump 50–60% 60–70% 70–80%

== Predictions ==
Source	Ranking	As of
Sabato's Crystal Ball	Tossup	January 22, 2026
State Navigate	Likely D (flip)	October 14, 2026

== Overview ==
Party	Candidates	Votes		Seats		
Party	Candidates	No.	%	Before	After	+/–
Republican	26			17	10	▼7
Democratic	29			13	20	▲7
No Labels	2			0	0	Steady
Independent	1			0	0	Steady
Total				30	30	

== Retiring incumbents ==
=== Republicans ===
1. District 13: J.D. Mesnard is term-limited and running for San Marcos justice of the peace.
2. District 14: Warren Petersen is retiring to run for attorney general.
3. District 17: Vince Leach is retiring.
4. District 19: David Gowan is term-limited and is running for state house.
5. District 30: Hildy Angius is retiring.

=== Democrats ===
1. District 5: Lela Alston is term-limited.
2. District 6: Theresa Hatathlie is retiring.
3. District 12: Mitzi Epstein is retiring.
4. District 20: Sally Ann Gonzales is term-limited and is running for state house.

== Incumbents defeated ==
=== In general election ===
==== Republicans ====
1. District 2: Shawnna Bolick lost to Amelia Gallitano.
2. District 4: Carine Werner lost to Aaron Lieberman.
3. District 16: T. J. Shope lost to Elaine Aldrete.
4. District 27: Anthony Kern lost to Kyle Clayton.

==== Open seats that changed parties ====
1. District 13: Open seat currently held by Republican JD Mesnard flipped to Democrat Kristie O'Brien.
2. District 14: Open seat currently held by Republican Warren Petersen flipped to Democrat Stephanie Walsh.
3. District 13: Open seat currently held by Republican Vince Leach flipped to Democrat Edgar Soto.

== Summary of results by district ==
† - Incumbent not seeking re-election

District	2024 pres.	Incumbent	Party	Elected senator	Party
1st	R +33.2	Mark Finchem	Rep	Mark Finchem	Rep
2nd	R +5.6	Shawnna Bolick	Rep	Amelia Gallitano	Dem
3rd	R +24.5	John Kavanagh	Rep	John Kavanagh	Rep
4th	R +3.5	Carine Werner	Rep	Aaron Lieberman	Dem
5th	D +36.4	Lela Alston†	Dem	Christine Marsh	Dem
6th	D +27.2	Theresa Hatathlie†	Dem	Jamescita Peshlakai	Dem
7th	R +29.9	Wendy Rogers	Rep	Wendy Rogers	Rep
8th	D +19.7	Lauren Kuby	Dem	Lauren Kuby	Dem
9th	D +3.0	Kiana Sears	Dem	Kiana Sears	Dem
10th	R +20.9	Dave Farnsworth	Rep	Dave Farnsworth	Rep
11th	D +39.8	Catherine Miranda	Dem	Catherine Miranda	Dem
12th	D +15.9	Mitzi Epstein†	Dem	Patty Contreras	Dem
13th	R +1.2	J. D. Mesnard†	Rep	Kristie O'Brien	Dem
14th	R +18.3	Warren Petersen†	Rep	Stephanie Walsh	Dem
15th	R +30.5	Jake Hoffman	Rep	Jake Hoffman	Rep
16th	R +9.4	T. J. Shope	Rep	Elaine Aldrete	Dem
17th	R +3.9	Vince Leach†	Rep	Edgar Soto	Dem
18th	D +24.0	Priya Sundareshan	Dem	Priya Sundareshan	Dem
19th	R +23.0	David Gowan†	Rep	Gail Griffin	Rep
20th	D +43.2	Sally Ann Gonzales†	Dem	Alma Hernandez	Dem
21st	D +18.5	Rosanna Gabaldón	Dem	Rosanna Gabaldón	Dem
22nd	D +21.1	Eva Diaz	Dem	Eva Diaz	Dem
23rd	D +1.8	Brian Fernandez	Dem	Brian Fernandez	Dem
24th	D +20.5	Analise Ortiz	Dem	Analise Ortiz	Dem
25th	R +29.4	Tim Dunn	Rep	Tim Dunn	Rep
26th	D +28.8	Flavio Bravo	Dem	Flavio Bravo	Dem
27th	R +11.3	Kevin Payne	Rep	Kyle Clayton	Dem
28th	R +23.1	Frank Carroll	Rep	Frank Carroll	Rep
29th	R +18.3	Janae Shamp	Rep	Janae Shamp	Rep
30th	R +55.2	Hildy Angius†	Rep	Leo Biasiucci	Rep

== District 1 ==
2026 Arizona's 1st legislative district Senate election
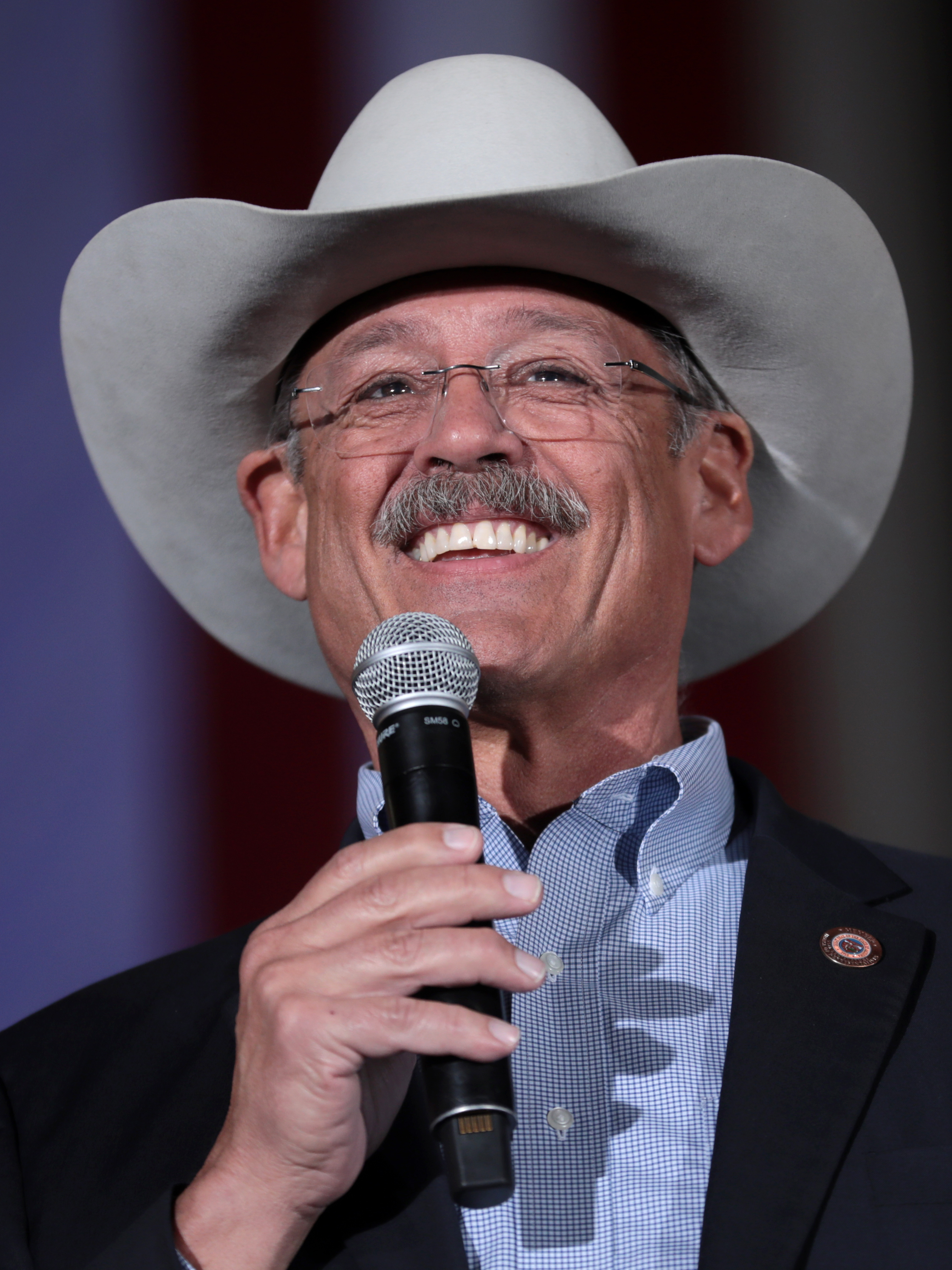

Nominee	Mark Finchem	Christine Dargon
Party	Republican	Democratic
Popular vote	73,920	45,114
Percentage	62.10%	37.90%
- Results by precinct Finchem: 50–60% 60–70% 70–80% 80–90% 90–100%; Dargon: 50–60% 60–70%
State Senator before election
Mark Finchem
Republican
Elected State Senator
Mark Finchem
Republican

The 1st district is located in Northern Arizona, containing almost all of Yavapai County and a small section of Coconino County containing Sedona. The incumbent is one-term Republican Mark Finchem of Prescott, who is eligible to run for re-election.

In 2024, Finchem defeated Democratic nominee Mike Fogel 69.5% to 34.1% after winning the Republican primary against incumbent Senator Ken Bennett.

=== Republican primary ===
==== Nominee ====
- Mark Finchem, incumbent state senator (2025–present)

==== Fundraising ====
Campaign finance reports as of March 2026
Candidate	Raised	Spent	Cash on hand
Mark Finchem (R)	$139,675.00	$113,823.26	$37,467.39
Source: See the Money

==== Results ====
Republican primary results
Party	Candidate	Votes	%
Republican	Mark Finchem	41,659	100.00
Total votes		41,659	100.0

=== Democratic primary ===
==== Nominee ====
- Christine Dargon, psychologist, educator, and wellness entrepreneur

==== Fundraising ====
Campaign finance reports as of March 2026
Candidate	Raised	Spent	Cash on hand
Christine Dargon (D)	$100.00	$127.64	$2,150.00
Source: See the Money

==== Results ====
Democratic primary results
Party	Candidate	Votes	%
Democratic	Christine Ellen Dargon	17,722	100.00
Total votes		17,722	100.0

== District 2 ==
2026 Arizona's 2nd legislative district Senate election

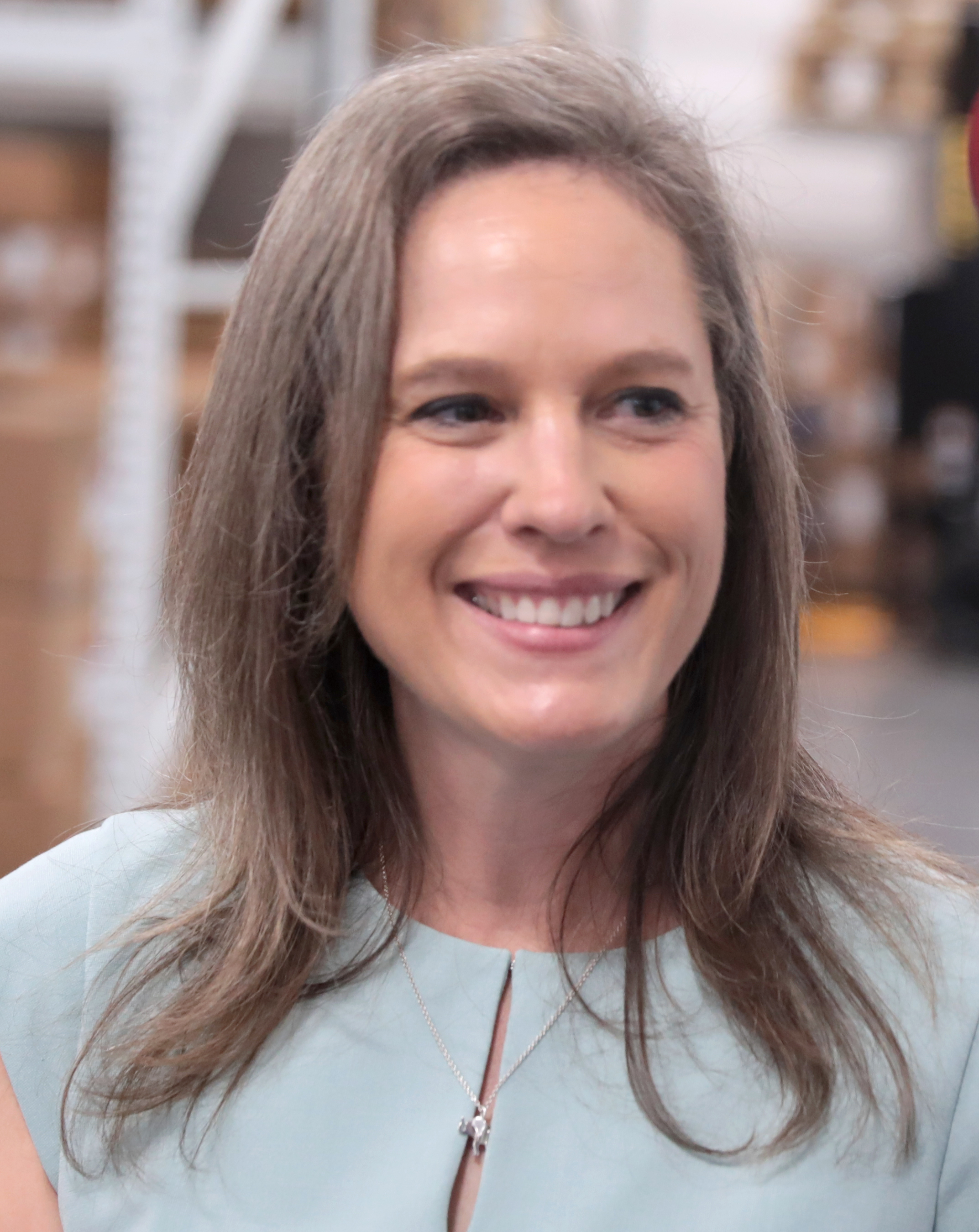
Nominee	Amelia Gallitano	Shawnna Bolick
Party	Democratic	Republican
Popular vote	43,890	34,385
Percentage	56.07%	43.93%
- Results by precinct Gallitano: 50–60% 60–70%; Bolick: 50–60%
State Senator before election
Shawnna Bolick
Republican
Elected State Senator
Amelia Gallitano
Democratic

The 2nd district is located in Maricopa County, containing a portion of Phoenix. The incumbent is two-term Republican Shawnna Bolick, who is eligible to run for re-election.

In 2024, Senator Bolick defeated Democratic nominee Judy Schwiebert 50.8% to 47.2%.

=== Republican primary ===
==== Nominee ====
- Shawnna Bolick, incumbent state senator (2023–present)

==== Eliminated in primary ====
- Timothy Ferrara, community leader

==== Fundraising ====
Campaign finance reports as of March 2026
Candidate	Raised	Spent	Cash on hand
Timothy Ferrara (R)	$3,665.00	$445.71	$705.00
Source: See the Money

==== Results ====
Republican primary results
Party	Candidate	Votes	%
Republican	Shawnna Bolick	11,617	71.44
Republican	Timothy John Ferrara	4,645	28.56
Total votes		16,262	100.0

=== Democratic primary ===
==== Nominee ====
- Amelia Gallitano, doctor, scientist, and professor at the University of Arizona College of Medicine – Phoenix

==== Eliminated in primary ====
- Dan Toporek, veteran, former staffer for U.S. Senator Mark Kelly, and former FAA safety inspector

==== Fundraising ====
Campaign finance reports as of March 2026
Candidate	Raised	Spent	Cash on hand
Amelia Gallitano (D)	$0.00	$0.00	$0.00
Dan Toporek (D)	$13,282.94	$10,649.54	$3,946.46
Source: See the Money

==== Results ====
Democratic primary results
Party	Candidate	Votes	%
Democratic	Amelia Gallitano	11,453	77.39
Democratic	Daniel Toporek	3,347	22.61
Total votes		14,800	100.0

== District 3 ==
2026 Arizona's 3rd legislative district Senate election
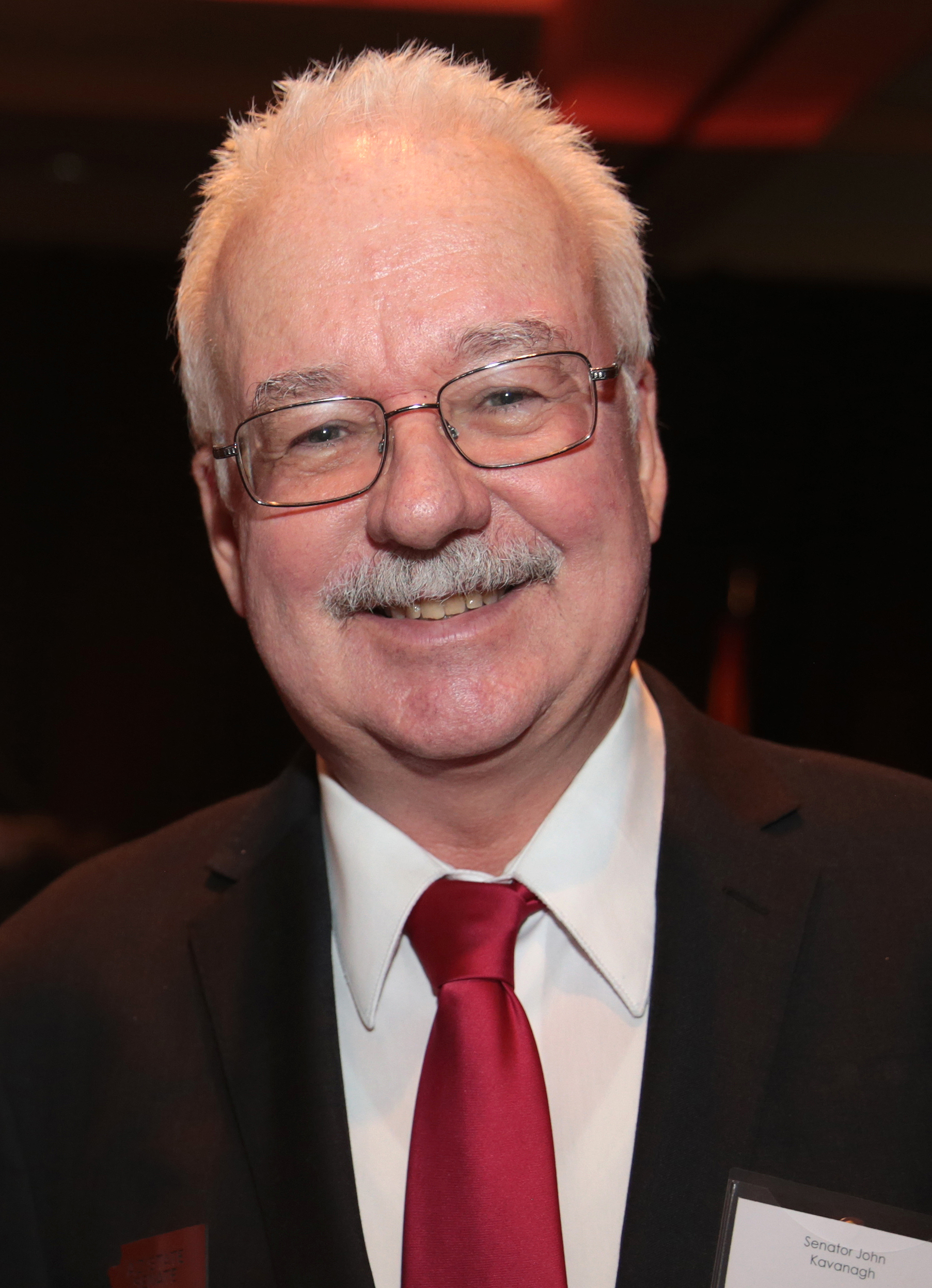

Nominee	John Kavanagh	Jeff Fortney
Party	Republican	Democratic
State Senator before election
John Kavanagh
Republican
Elected State Senator
TBD

The 3rd district occupies the northeast tip of Maricopa County, containing portions of Phoenix, most of Scottsdale, and all of Fountain Hills, Rio Verde, Cave Creek, Carefree, New River, and Anthem. The incumbent is four-term Republican John Kavanagh, who is eligible to run for re-election due to serving non-consecutive terms.

In 2024, Senator Kavanaugh was unopposed in his re-election bid.

=== Republican primary ===
==== Nominee ====
- John Kavanagh, incumbent state senator (2015–2019, 2023–present)

==== Eliminated in primary ====
- Robert Wallace, conservative activist and grassroots organizer

==== Fundraising ====
Campaign finance reports as of March 2026
Candidate	Raised	Spent	Cash on hand
John Kavanagh (R)	$91,535.61	$6,253.94	$175,293.20
Robert Wallace (R)	$239.40	$0.00	$239.40
Source: See the Money

==== Results ====
Republican primary results
Party	Candidate	Votes	%
Republican	John Kavanagh	35,902	85.23
Republican	Robert Michael Wallace	6,224	14.77
Total votes		42,126	100.0

=== Democratic primary ===
==== Nominee ====
- Jeff Fortney, at-large member of the Cave Creek Unified School District (2021–present)

==== Fundraising ====
Campaign finance reports as of March 2026
Candidate	Raised	Spent	Cash on hand
Jeff Fortney (D)	$7,195.00	$3,490.88	$3,704.12
Source: See the Money

==== Results ====
Democratic primary results
Party	Candidate	Votes	%
Democratic	Jeffrey Fortney	19,696	100.00
Total votes		19,696	100.0

== District 4 ==
2026 Arizona's 4th legislative district Senate election
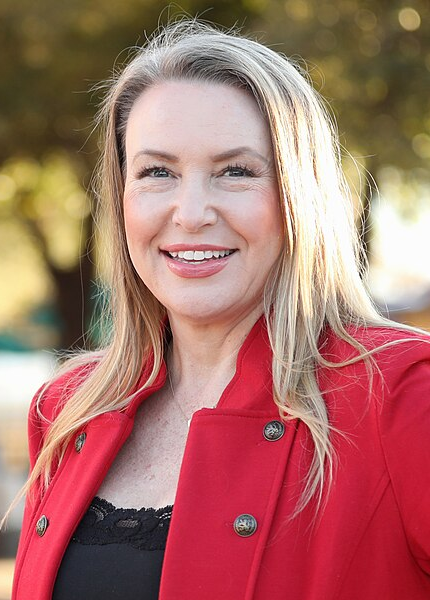

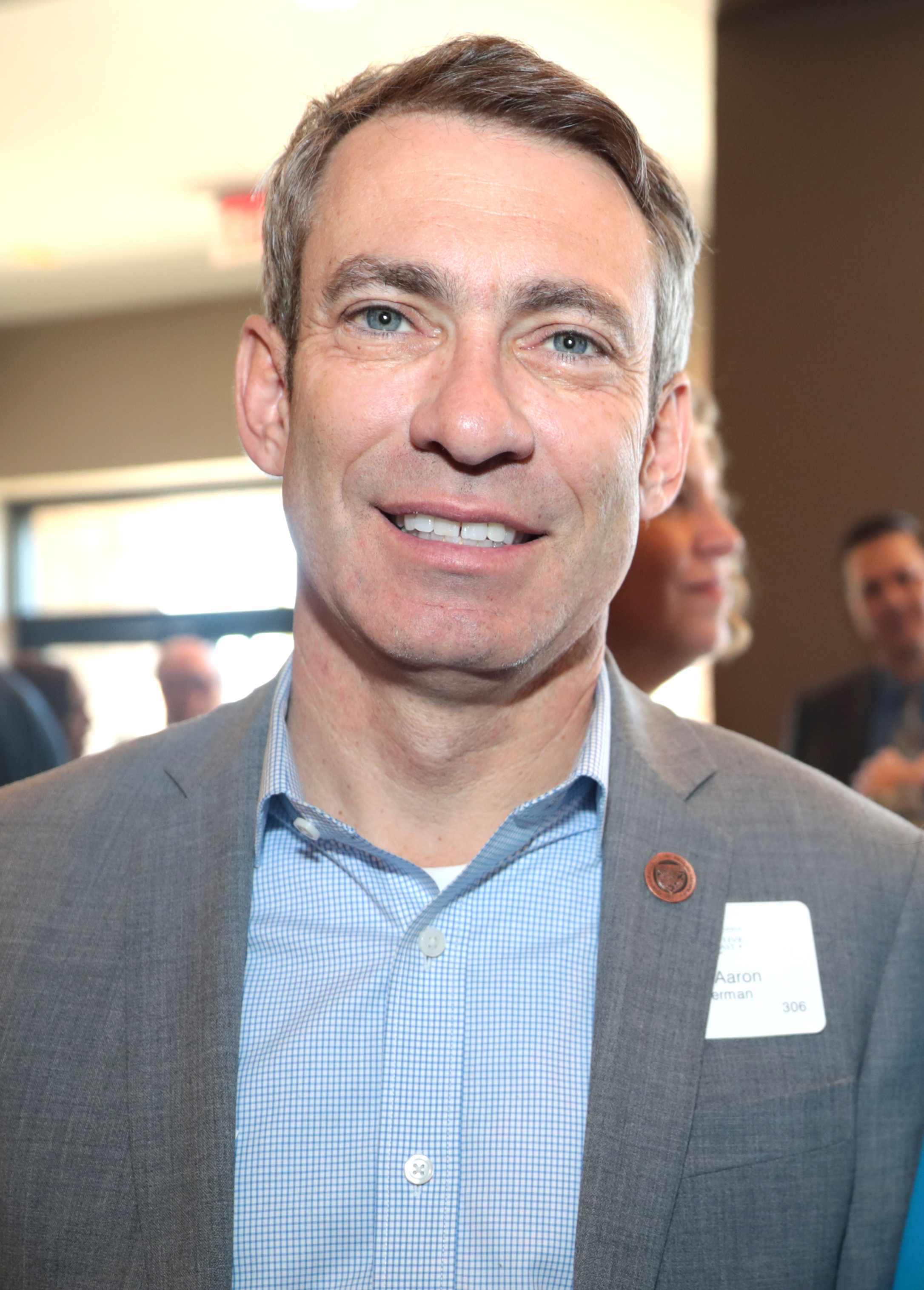
Nominee	Carine Werner	Aaron Lieberman
Party	Republican	Democratic
State Senator before election
Carine Werner
Republican
Elected State Senator
TBD

The 4th district is located in Maricopa County, containing portions of Phoenix and Scottsdale and all of Paradise Valley. The incumbent is one-term Republican Carine Werner, who is eligible to run for re-election.

In 2024, Werner defeated incumbent Democratic Senator Christine Marsh, 51.9% to 48.1%.

=== Republican primary ===
==== Nominee ====
- Carine Werner, incumbent state senator (2025–present)

==== Fundraising ====
Campaign finance reports as of March 2026
Candidate	Raised	Spent	Cash on hand
Carine Werner (R)	$304,437.96	$40,682.51	$272,939.27
Source: See the Money

==== Results ====
Republican primary results
Party	Candidate	Votes	%
Republican	Carine Werner	25,102	100.00
Total votes		25,102	100.0

=== Democratic primary ===
==== Nominee ====
- Aaron Lieberman, former state representative from the 28th district and candidate for governor in 2022

==== Fundraising ====
Campaign finance reports as of March 2026
Candidate	Raised	Spent	Cash on hand
Aaron Lieberman (D)	$101,585.00	$13,187.39	$88,397.61
Source: See the Money

==== Results ====
Democratic primary results
Party	Candidate	Votes	%
Democratic	Aaron Lieberman	22,545	100.00
Total votes		22,545	100.0

== District 5 ==
2026 Arizona's 5th legislative district Senate election
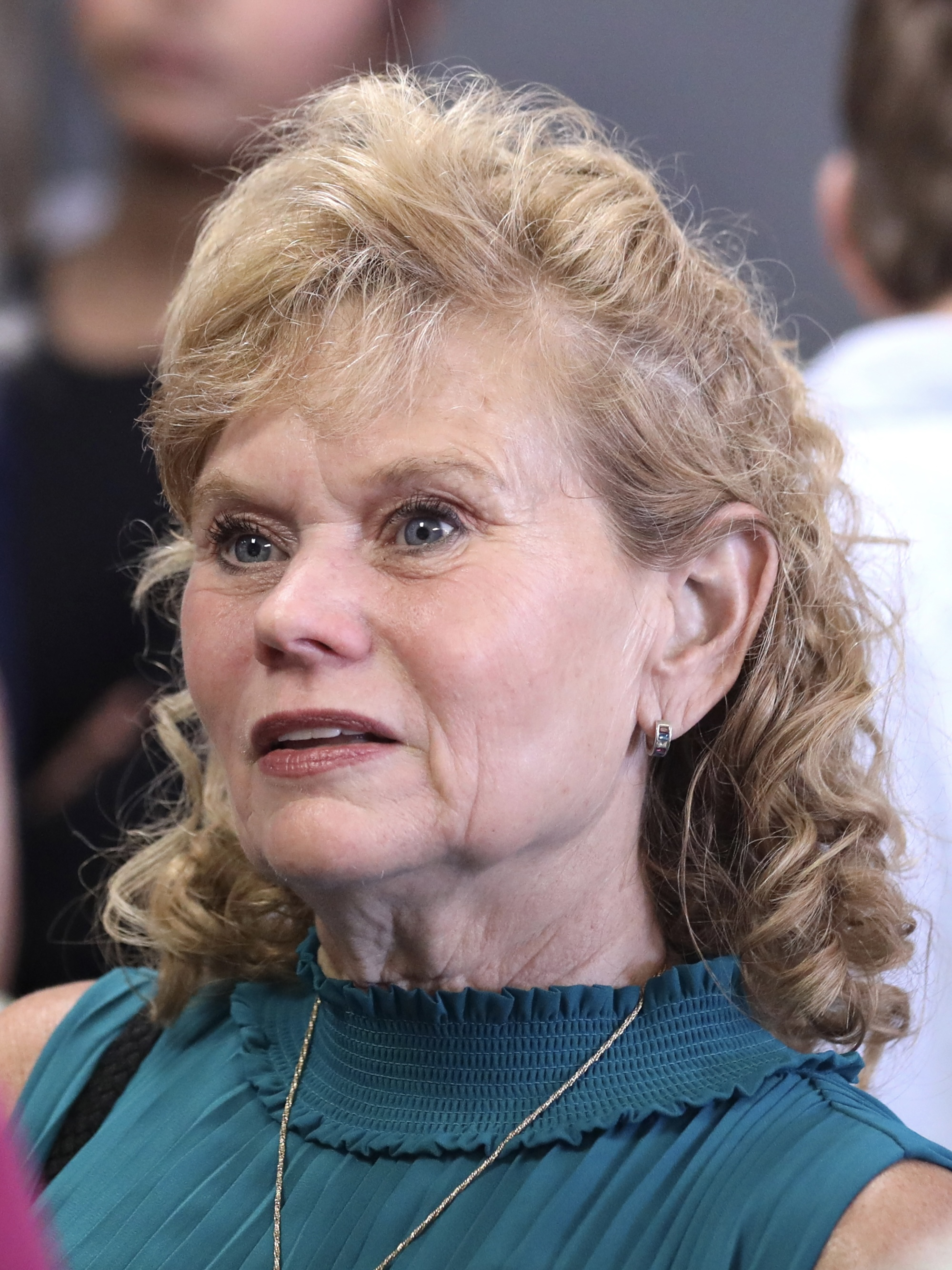
Nominee	Christine Marsh	Jason LaForest
Party	Democratic	Independent
State Senator before election
Lela Alston
Democratic
Elected State Senator
TBD

The 5th district is located in Maricopa County, located entirely in central Phoenix. The incumbent is thirteen-term Democrat Lela Alston, who is ineligible to run for re-election.

In 2024, Senator Alston defeated Republican nominee Joshua Ortega 68.3% to 31.7%.

=== Democratic primary ===
==== Nominee ====
- Christine Marsh, public school teacher and former state senator from the 27th and 4th district (2021–2025)

==== Fundraising ====
Campaign finance reports as of March 2026
Candidate	Raised	Spent	Cash on hand
Christine Marsh (D)	$53,325.34	$24,650.56	$28,633.34
Source: See the Money

==== Results ====
Democratic primary results
Party	Candidate	Votes	%
Democratic	Christine Marsh	21,771	100.00
Total votes		21,771	100.0

=== Independents and third-party candidates ===
==== Declared ====
- Jason LaForest, financial strategist at the Arizona Department of Health Services (Arizona Independent)

==== Fundraising ====
Campaign finance reports as of March 2026
Candidate	Raised	Spent	Cash on hand
Jason LaForest (I)	$800.00	$870.32	$897.77
Source: See the Money

==== Results ====
No Labels primary results
Party	Candidate	Votes	%
No Labels	Jason LaForest	303	100.00
Total votes		303	100.0

== District 6 ==
2026 Arizona's 6th legislative district Senate election
Nominee	Jamescita Peshlakai	Lloyd Johnson
Party	Democratic	Republican
State Senator before election
Theresa Hatathlie
Democratic
Elected State Senator
TBD

The 6th district contains all of Apache County, as well as parts of Coconino, Gila, Graham, Mohave, Navajo, and Pinal County. The Havasupai, Hopi, Hualapai, Kaibab, Navajo, San Carlos Apache, San Juan Southern Paiute, and White Mountain Apache tribes are all located in this district. The incumbent is three-term Democrat Theresa Hatathlie, who is eligible to run for re-election.

In 2024, Senator Hatathlie was unopposed in her re-election bid.

=== Democratic primary ===
==== Nominee ====
- Jamescita Peshlakai, former state senator from the 7th district (2017–2021)

==== Eliminated in primary ====
- Myron Tsosie, incumbent state representative (2019–present)

==== Fundraising ====
Campaign finance reports as of March 2026
Candidate	Raised	Spent	Cash on hand
Jamescita Peshlakai (D)	$945.00	$0.00	$1,105.00
Myron Tsosie (D)	$2,750.00	$0.00	$2,750.00
Source: See the Money

==== Results ====
Democratic primary results
Party	Candidate	Votes	%
Democratic	Jamescita Peshlakai	15,987	56.18
Democratic	Myron Tsosie	12,468	43.82
Total votes		28,455	100.0

=== Republican primary ===
==== Nominee ====
- Lloyd Johnson, maintenance manager

==== Fundraising ====
Campaign finance reports as of March 2026
Candidate	Raised	Spent	Cash on hand
Lloyd Johnson (R)	$1,316.03	$701.95	$1,761.40
Source: See the Money

==== Results ====
Republican primary results
Party	Candidate	Votes	%
Republican	Lloyd Johnson	8,872	100.00
Total votes		8,872	100.0

== District 7 ==
2026 Arizona's 7th legislative district Senate election
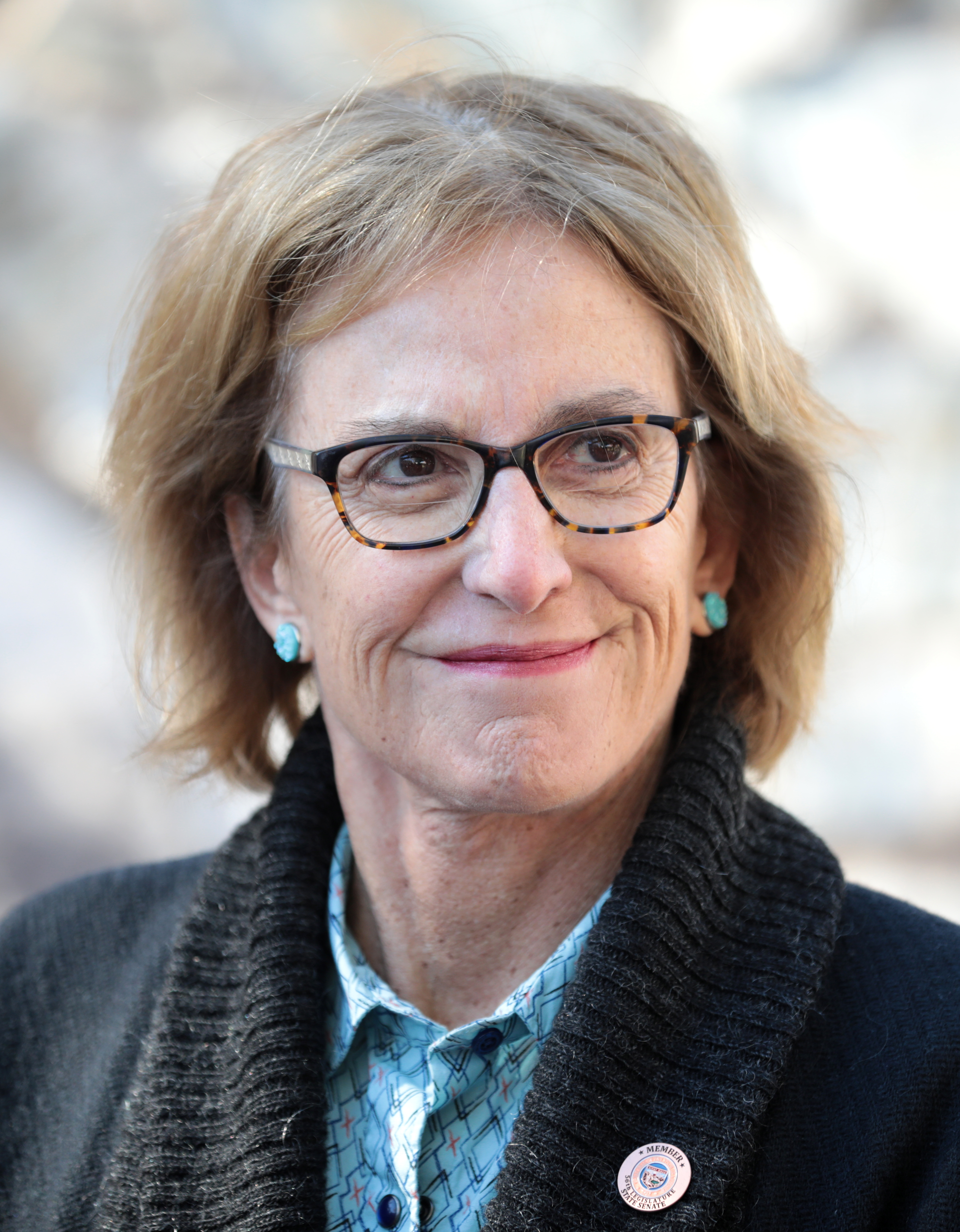

Nominee	Wendy Rogers	Mike Montiel
Party	Republican	Democratic
State Senator before election
Wendy Rogers
Republican
Elected State Senator
TBD

The 7th district consists of parts of Coconino, Gila, Navajo, and Pinal County. The incumbent is three-term Republican Wendy Rogers, who is eligible to run for re-election.

In 2024, Senator Rogers defeated Democratic nominee Haley Creighton 65.0% to 35.0%.

=== Republican primary ===
==== Nominee ====
- Wendy Rogers, incumbent state senator (2021–present)

==== Fundraising ====
Campaign finance reports as of March 2026
Candidate	Raised	Spent	Cash on hand
Wendy Rogers (R)	$438,804.11	$238,865.46	$233,328.77
Source: See the Money

==== Results ====
Republican primary results
Party	Candidate	Votes	%
Republican	Wendy Rogers	30,032	100.00
Total votes		30,032	100.0

=== Democratic primary ===
==== Nominee ====
- Mike Montiel, veteran and community organizer

==== Results ====
Democratic primary results
Party	Candidate	Votes	%
Democratic	Michiel "Mike" Montiel	14,211	100.00
Total votes		14,211	100.0

== District 8 ==
2026 Arizona's 8th legislative district Senate election
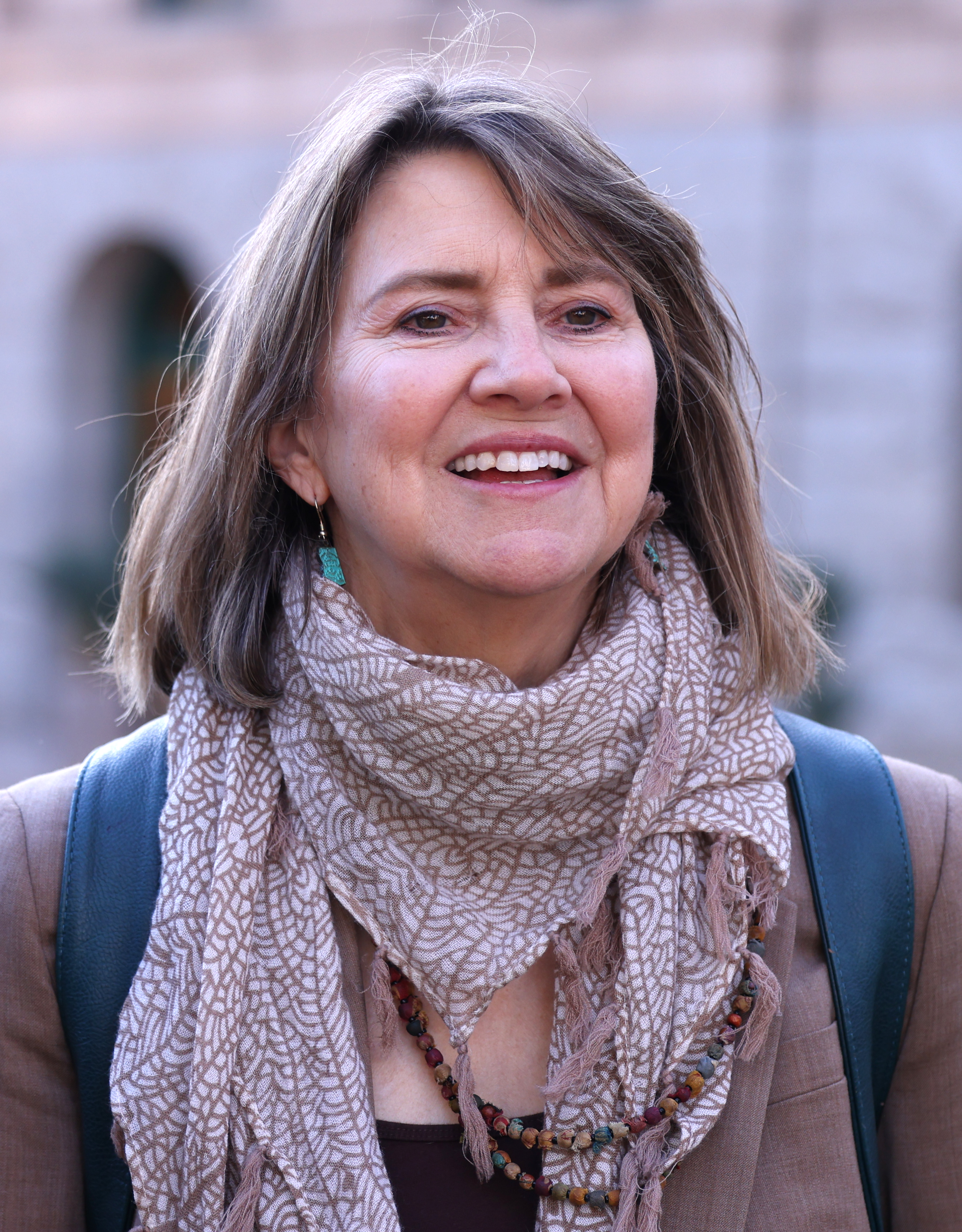
Nominee	Lauren Kuby	Bill Loughrige
Party	Democratic	Republican
State Senator before election
Lauren Kuby
Democratic
Elected State Senator
TBD

The 8th district is located in Maricopa County, and consists of small parts of Mesa, Scottsdale, and Phoenix, as well as northern Tempe. The incumbent is one-term Democrat Lauren Kuby, who is eligible to run for re-election.

In 2024, Kuby defeated Republican nominee Roxana Holzapfel 60.6% to 39.4%.

=== Democratic primary ===
==== Nominee ====
- Lauren Kuby, incumbent state senator (2025–present)

==== Eliminated in primary ====
- Deborah Nardozzi, former state representative for this district (2024–2025)

==== Fundraising ====
Campaign finance reports as of March 2026
Candidate	Raised	Spent	Cash on hand
Lauren Kuby (D)	$74,731.85	$9,910.90	$62,207.94
Deborah Nardozzi (D)	$39,826.00	$13,390.06	$25,800.94
Source: See the Money

==== Results ====
Democratic primary results
Party	Candidate	Votes	%
Democratic	Lauren Kuby	12,981	76.77
Democratic	Deborah Nardozzi	3,928	23.23
Total votes		16,909	100.0

=== Republican primary ===
==== Nominee ====
- Bill Loughrige '(write-in)'

==== Results ====
Republican primary results
Party	Candidate	Votes	%
Republican	Bill Loughrige (Write-in)	572	100.00
Total votes		572	100.0

== District 9 ==
2026 Arizona's 9th legislative district Senate election
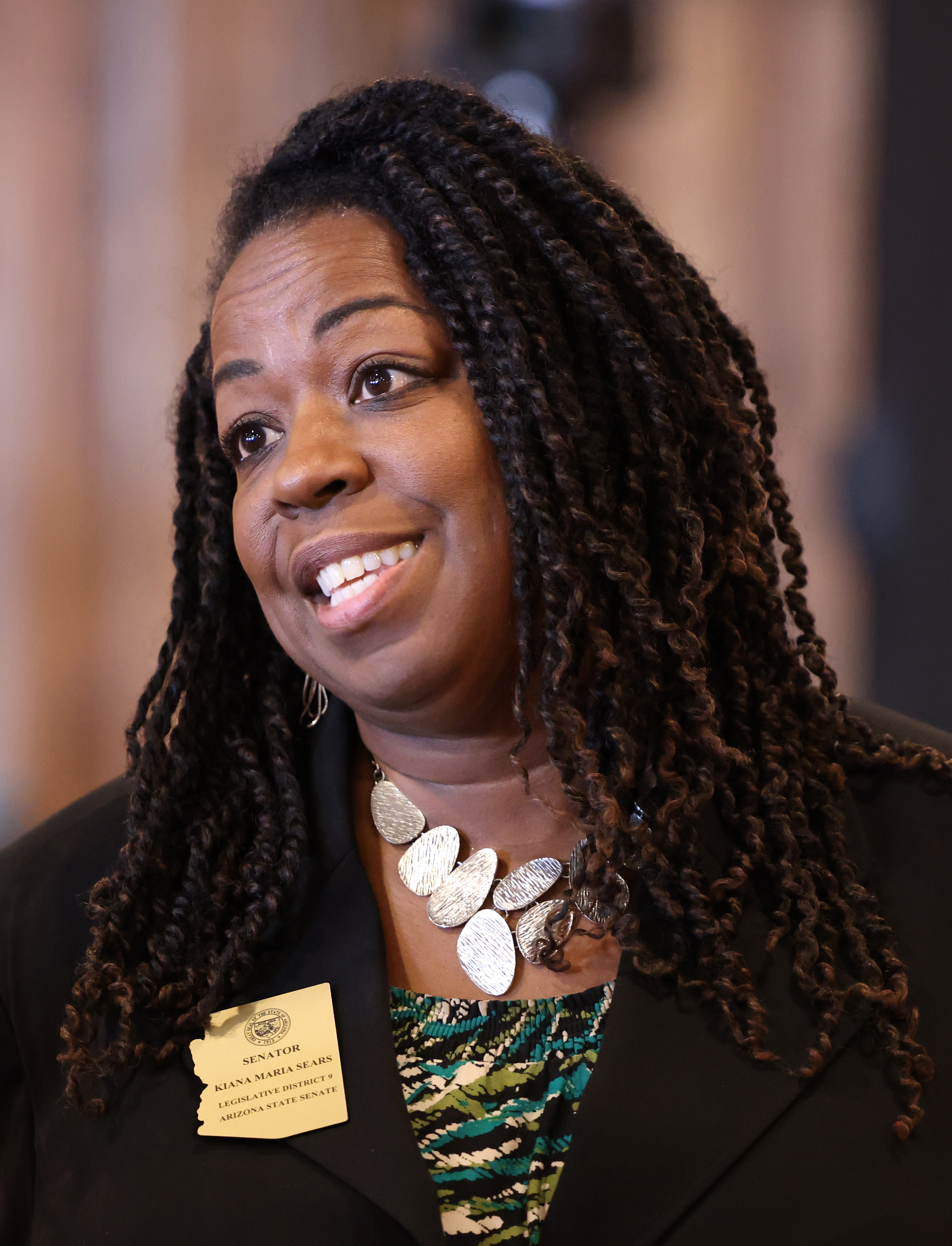

Nominee	Kiana Sears	Bridget Fitzgibbons
Party	Democratic	Republican
State Senator before election
Kiana Sears
Democratic
Elected State Senator
TBD

The 9th district is located in Maricopa County, and consists almost entirely of western Mesa, as well a very small portion of Tempe. The incumbent is one-term Democrat Kiana Sears, who was appointed to her position in 2025 after the resignation of Senator Eva Burch and is eligible to run for re-election.

In 2024, incumbent Senator Burch defeated Republican nominee Robert Scantlebury 51.7% to 48.3%.

=== Democratic primary ===
==== Nominee ====
- Kiana Sears, incumbent state senator (2025–present)

==== Fundraising ====
Campaign finance reports as of March 2026
Candidate	Raised	Spent	Cash on hand
Kiana Sears (D)	$11,420.00	$3,142.17	$8,277.83
Source: See the Money

==== Results ====
Democratic primary results
Party	Candidate	Votes	%
Democratic	Kiana Maria Sears	12,161	100.00
Total votes		12,161	100.0

=== Republican primary ===
==== Nominee ====
- Bridget Fitzgibbons, physician

==== Results ====
Republican primary results
Party	Candidate	Votes	%
Republican	Bridget Fitzgibbons	10,538	100.00
Total votes		10,538	100.0

== District 10 ==
2026 Arizona's 10th legislative district Senate election
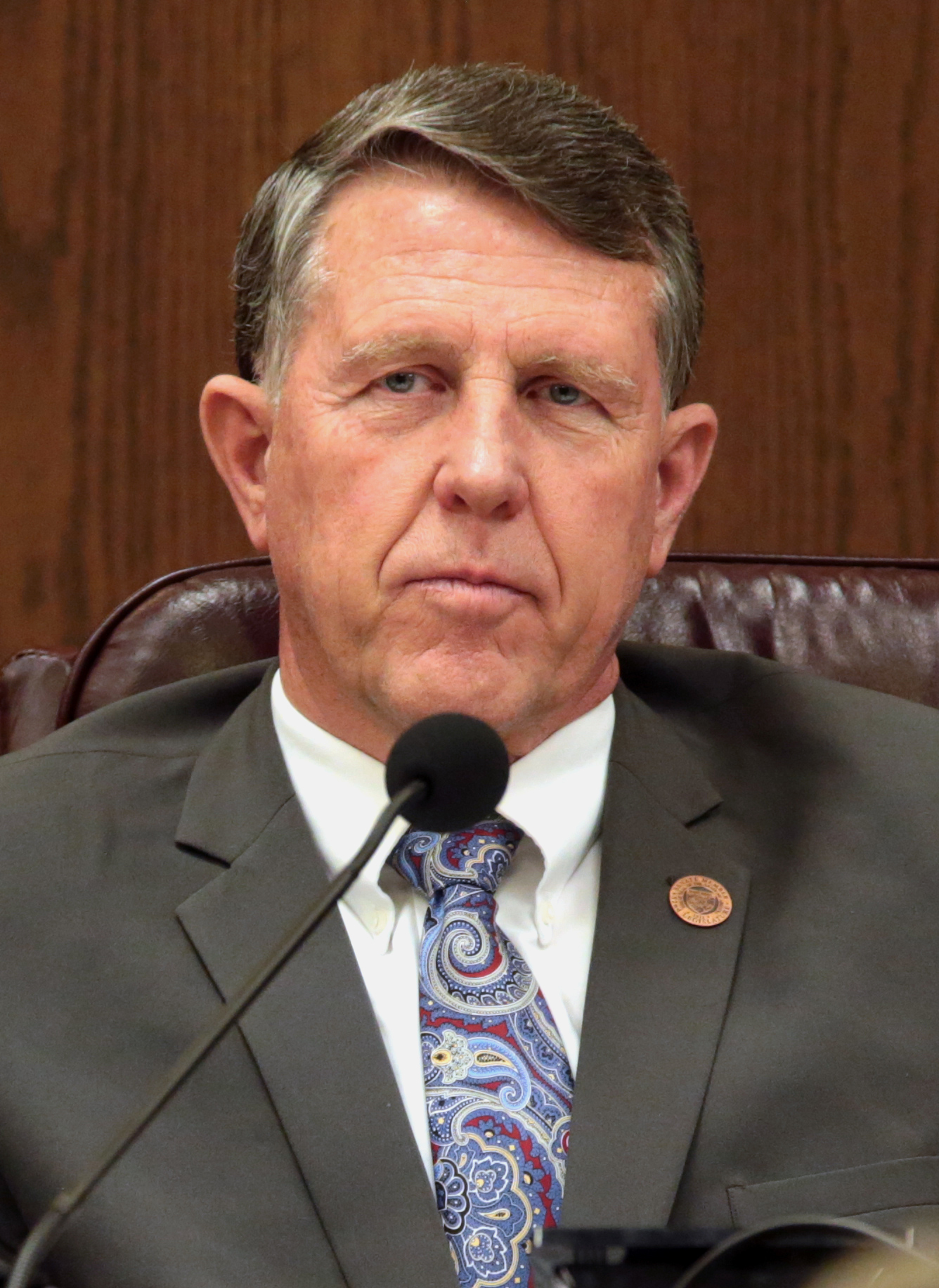

Nominee	Dave Farnsworth	Blair Moses
Party	Republican	Democratic
State Senator before election
Dave Farnsworth
Republican
Elected State Senator
TBD

The 10th district is located in Maricopa County, and consists of western Mesa and a small portion of Apache Junction. The incumbent is six-term Republican Dave Farnsworth, who is eligible to run for re-election due to serving non-consecutive terms.

In 2024, Senator Farnsworth defeated Democratic nominee Robert Doyle 61.5% to 38.5%.

=== Republican primary ===
==== Nominee ====
- Dave Farnsworth, incumbent state senator (2013–2021, 2023–present)

==== Fundraising ====
Campaign finance reports as of March 2026
Candidate	Raised	Spent	Cash on hand
Dave Farnsworth (R)	$0.00	$0.00	$0.00
Source: See the Money

==== Results ====
Republican primary results
Party	Candidate	Votes	%
Republican	David Farnsworth	24,189	100.00
Total votes		24,189	100.0

=== Democratic primary ===
==== Nominee ====
- Blair Moses, lawyer

==== Fundraising ====
Campaign finance reports as of March 2026
Candidate	Raised	Spent	Cash on hand
Blair Moses (D)	$2,679.05	$151.27	$2,463.73
Source: See the Money

==== Results ====
Democratic primary results
Party	Candidate	Votes	%
Democratic	Blair Moses	14,577	100.00
Total votes		14,577	100.0

=== Independents and third-party candidates ===
==== Declared ====
- Nick Fierro, doctor (Independent)

==== Fundraising ====
Campaign finance reports as of March 2026
Candidate	Raised	Spent	Cash on hand
Nick Fierro (I)	$2,161.84	$59.96	$424.04
Source: See the Money

== District 11 ==
2026 Arizona's 11th legislative district Senate election
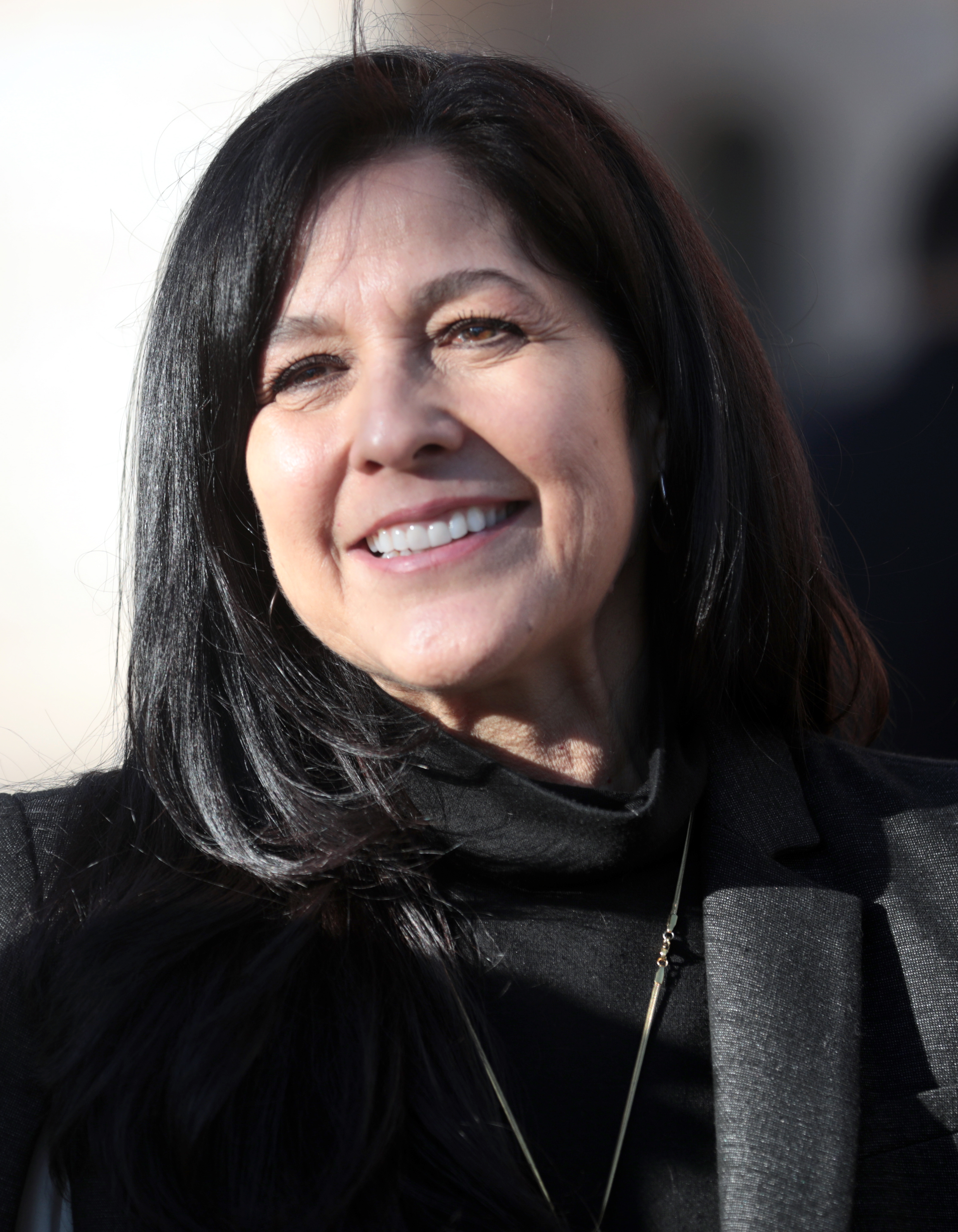

Nominee	Catherine Miranda	Joshua Ayala
Party	Democratic	Republican
State Senator before election
Catherine Miranda
Democratic
Elected State Senator
TBD

The 11th district is located in Maricopa County and consists of Guadalupe and southern Phoenix. The incumbent is four-term Democrat Catherine Miranda, who is eligible to run for re-election due to serving non-consecutive terms.

In 2024, Senator Miranda defeated Republican nominee Joshua Ayala 72.2% to 27.8%.

=== Democratic primary ===
==== Nominee ====
- Catherine Miranda, incumbent state senator (2015–2019, 2023–present)

==== Fundraising ====
Campaign finance reports as of March 2026
Candidate	Raised	Spent	Cash on hand
Catherine Miranda (D)	$18,750.00	$12,331.79	$36,671.11
Source: See the Money

==== Results ====
Democratic primary results
Party	Candidate	Votes	%
Democratic	Catherine Miranda	12,905	100.00
Total votes		12,905	100.0

=== Republican primary ===
==== Nominee ====
- Joshua Ayala, business executive and nominee for this district in 2024

==== Results ====
Republican primary results
Party	Candidate	Votes	%
Republican	Joshua Ayala	3,435	100.00
Total votes		3,435	100.0

== District 12 ==
2026 Arizona's 12th legislative district Senate election
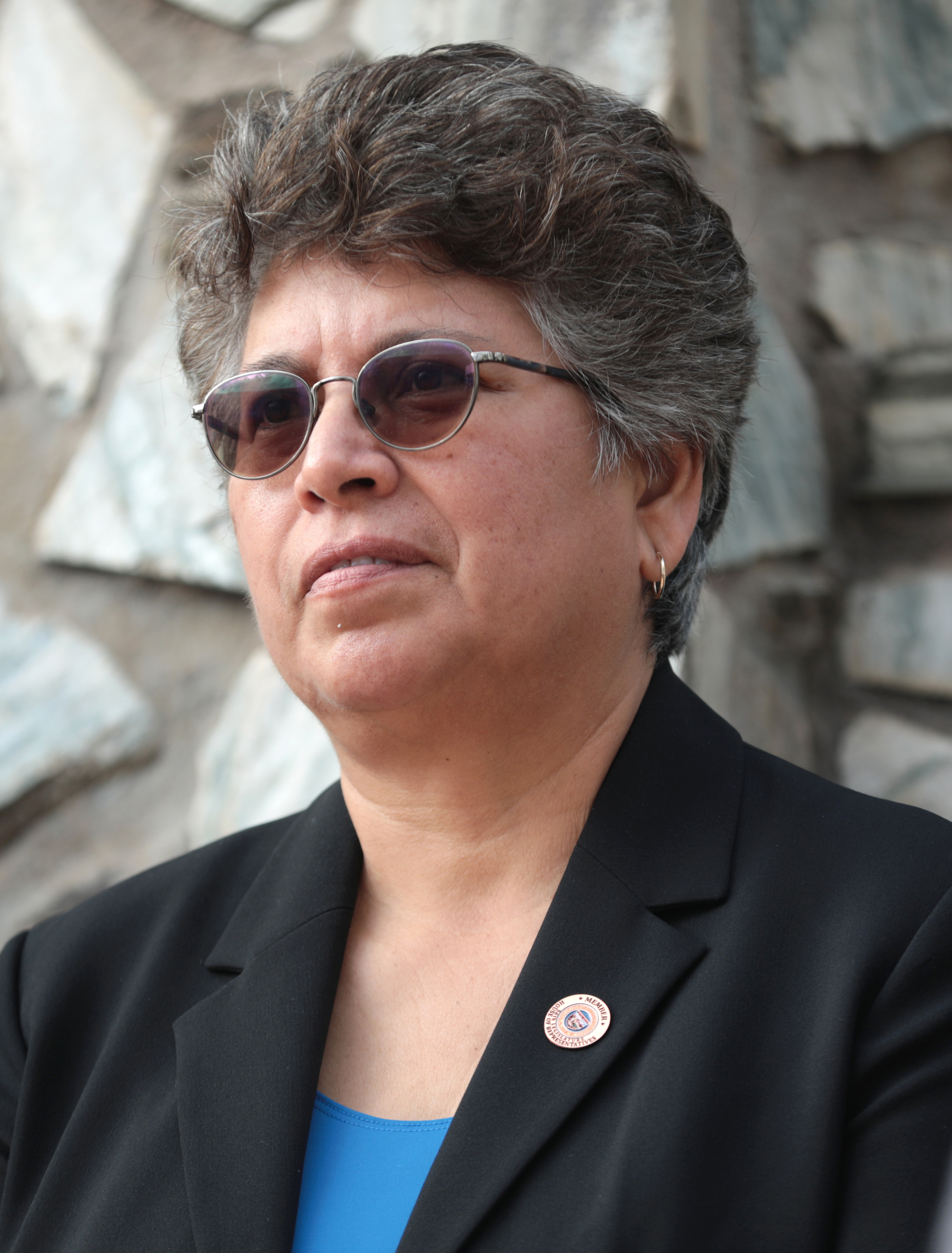

Nominee	Patty Contreras	Anthony Ramirez
Party	Democratic	Independent
State Senator before election
Mitzi Epstein
Democratic
Elected State Senator
TBD

The 12th district is located in Maricopa County and consists of parts of Chandler, Tempe, and Phoenix. The incumbent is two-term Democrat Mitzi Epstein, who is eligible to run for re-election but has opted to retire.

In 2024, Senator Epstein defeated Republican nominee Cara Vicini 58.1% to 41.9%.

=== Democratic primary ===
==== Nominee ====
- Patty Contreras, incumbent state representative for this district (2023–present)

==== Fundraising ====
Campaign finance reports as of March 2026
Candidate	Raised	Spent	Cash on hand
Patty Contreras (D)	$22,137.00	$7,403.16	$31,324.30
Source: See the Money

==== Results ====
Democratic primary results
Party	Candidate	Votes	%
Democratic	Patricia "Patty" Contreras	22,070	100.00
Total votes		22,070	100.0

=== Independents and third-party candidates ===
==== Declared ====
- Anthony Ramirez, attorney (Arizona Independent)

==== Results ====
No Labels primary results
Party	Candidate	Votes	%
No Labels	Anthony Jason Ramirez	445	100.00
Total votes		445	100.0

== District 13 ==
2026 Arizona's 13th legislative district Senate election
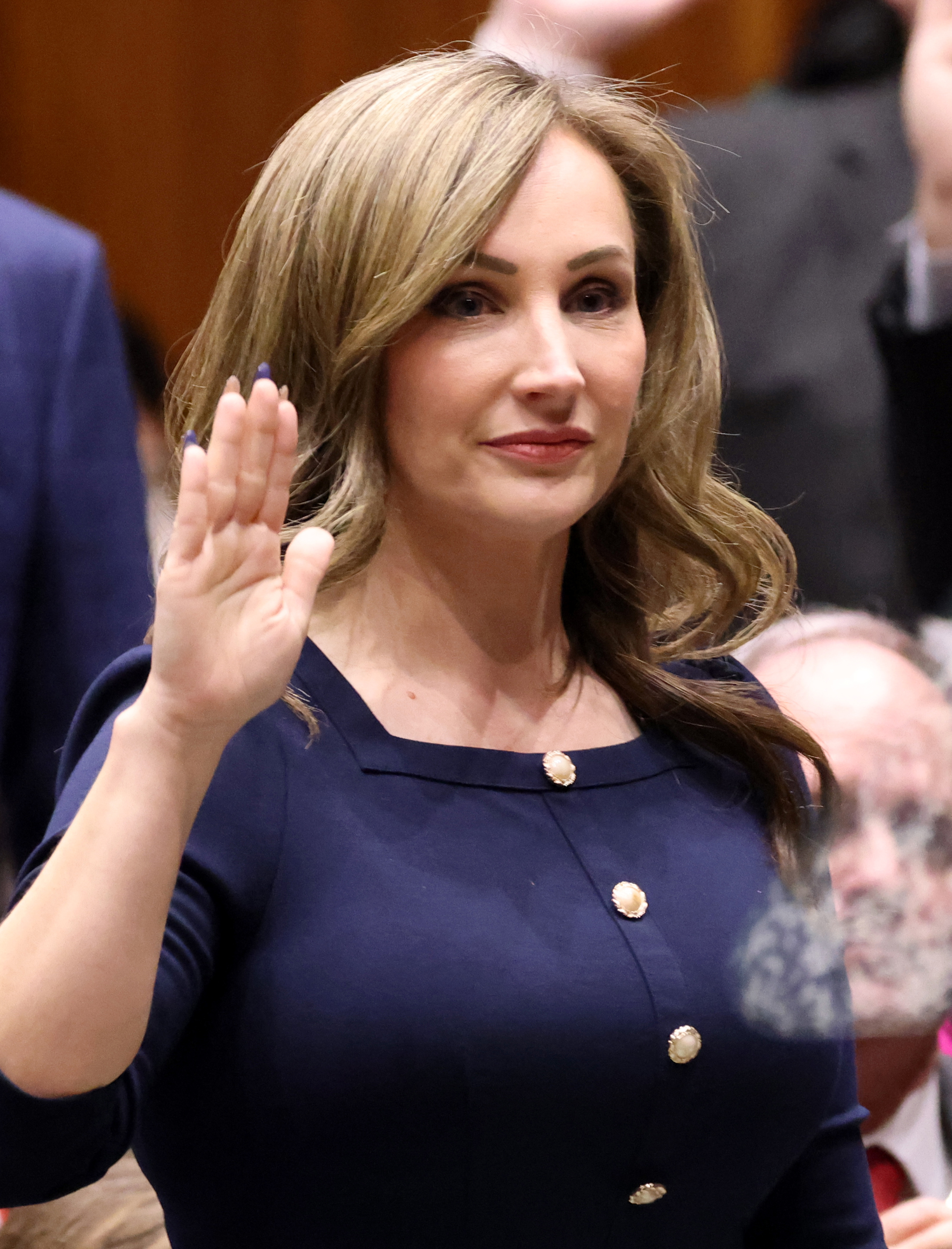

Nominee	Julie Willoughby	Kristie O'Brien
Party	Republican	Democratic
State Senator before election
J.D. Mesnard
Republican
Elected State Senator
Kristie O'Brien
Democratic

The 13th district is located in Maricopa County and consists of most of Chandler and Sun Lakes, as well as small parts of western Gilbert. The incumbent is four-term Republican J. D. Mesnard, who is ineligible to run for re-election.

In 2024, Senator Mesnard defeated Democratic nominee Sharon Lee Winters 53.1% to 46.9%.

=== Republican primary ===
==== Nominee ====
- Julie Willoughby, incumbent state representative for this district

==== Fundraising ====
Campaign finance reports as of March 2026
Candidate	Raised	Spent	Cash on hand
Julie Willoughby (R)	$144,277.68	$11,666.61	$132,611.07
Source: See the Money

==== Results ====
Republican primary results
Party	Candidate	Votes	%
Republican	Julie Willoughby	20,222	100.00
Total votes		20,222	100.0

=== Democratic primary ===
==== Nominee ====
- Kristie O'Brien, lawyer

==== Results ====
Democratic primary results
Party	Candidate	Votes	%
Democratic	Kristie O'Brien	17,165	100.00
Total votes		17,165	100.0

== District 14 ==
2026 Arizona's 14th legislative district Senate election
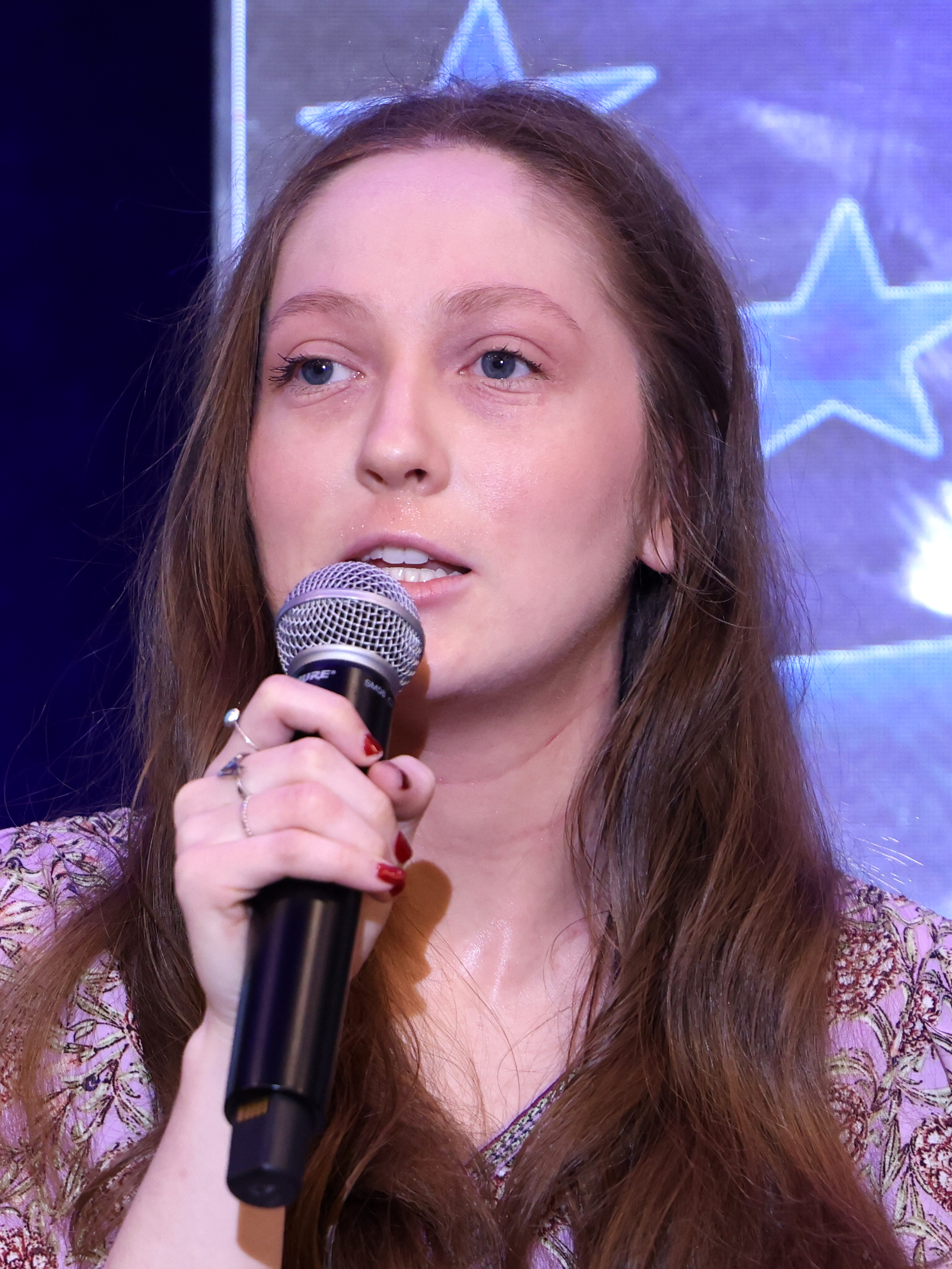

Nominee	Mylie Biggs	Stephanie Walsh
Party	Republican	Democratic
State Senator before election
Warren Petersen
Republican
Elected State Senator
TBD

The 14th district is located in Maricopa County and consists of most of Gilbert, as well as tiny parts of Queen Creek and Chandler. The incumbent is four-term Republican and President of the Arizona Senate, Warren Petersen, who is eligible to run for re-election due to serving non-consecutive terms but has opted to instead run for attorney general.

In 2024, Senator Petersen defeated Democratic nominee Elizabeth Brown 60.1% to 39.9%.

=== Republican primary ===
==== Nominee ====
- Mylie Biggs, conservative political activist and daughter of U.S. representative Andy Biggs

==== Fundraising ====
Campaign finance reports as of March 2026
Candidate	Raised	Spent	Cash on hand
Mylie Biggs (R)	$7,313.38	$1,412.71	$11,811.34
Source: See the Money

==== Results ====
Republican primary results
Party	Candidate	Votes	%
Republican	Mylie Biggs	21,255	100.00
Total votes		21,255	100.0

=== Democratic primary ===
==== Nominee ====
- Stephanie Walsh, engineer

==== Fundraising ====
Campaign finance reports as of March 2026
Candidate	Raised	Spent	Cash on hand
Stephanie Walsh (D)	$8,175.00	$4,201.79	$4,470.51
Source: See the Money

==== Results ====
Democratic primary results
Party	Candidate	Votes	%
Democratic	Stephanie Walsh	13,317	100.00
Total votes		13,317	100.0

== District 15 ==
2026 Arizona's 15th legislative district Senate election
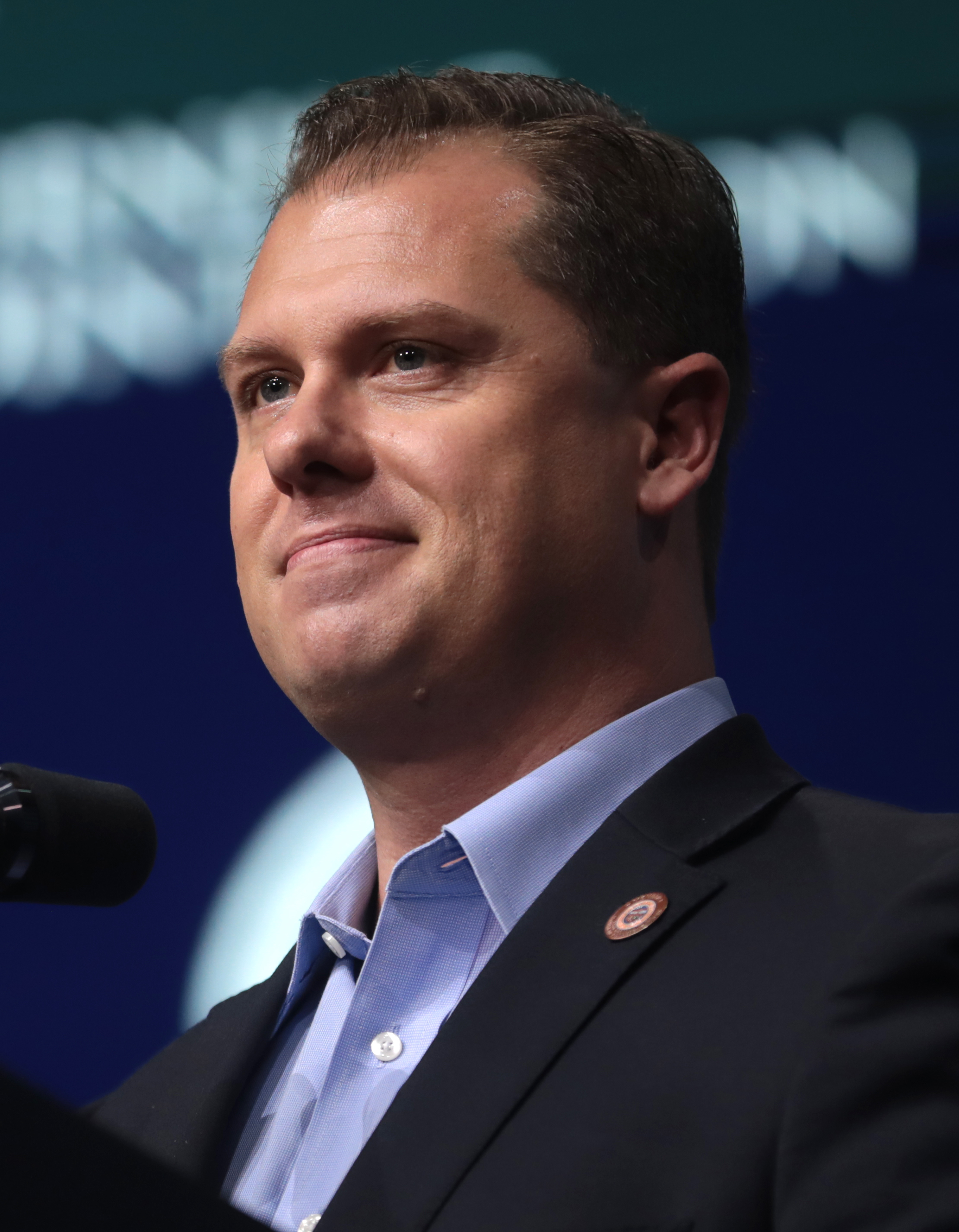

Nominee	Jake Hoffman	Jayme Accalia
Party	Republican	Democratic
State Senator before election
Jake Hoffman
Republican
Elected State Senator
TBD

The 15th district is located in Maricopa and Pinal County, and consists of all of San Tan Valley, almost all of Queen Creek, and the southern tip of Mesa. The incumbent is two-term Republican Jake Hoffman, who is eligible to run for re-election.

In 2024, Senator Hoffman defeated Democratic nominee Alan Smith 63.7% to 31.9%, with independent candidate Evan Olson also taking 4.4%.

=== Republican primary ===
==== Nominee ====
- Jake Hoffman, incumbent state senator (2023–present)

==== Results ====
Republican primary results
Party	Candidate	Votes	%
Republican	Jake Hoffman	26,391	100.00
Total votes		26,391	100.0

=== Democratic primary ===
==== Nominee ====
- Jayme Accalia, culinary professional and sustainable food systems advocate

==== Results ====
Democratic primary results
Party	Candidate	Votes	%
Democratic	Jayme Accalia	12,327	100.00
Total votes		12,327	100.0

== District 16 ==
2026 Arizona's 16th legislative district Senate election
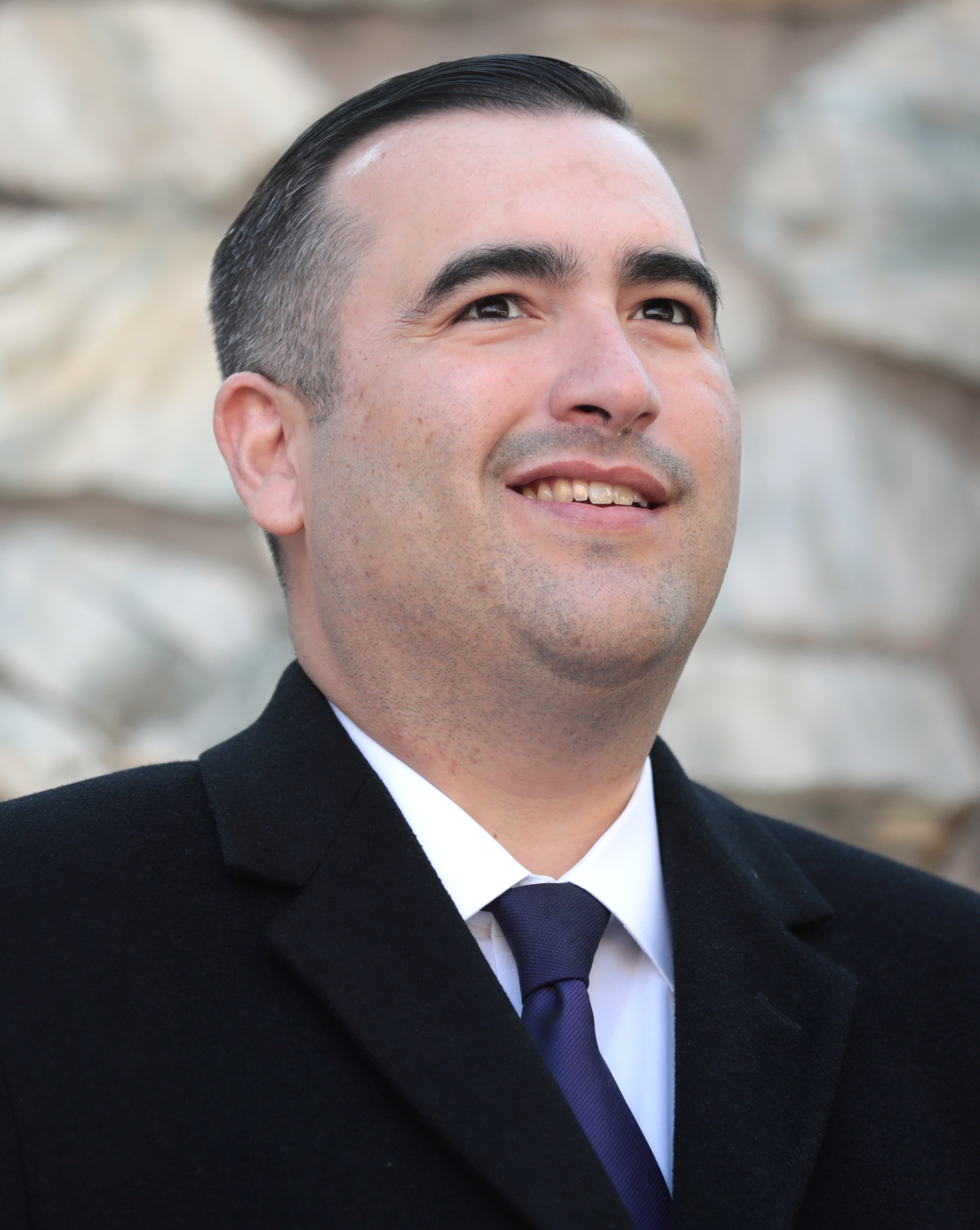

Nominee	T.J. Shope	Elaine Aldrete
Party	Republican	Democratic
State Senator before election
T.J. Shope
Republican
Elected State Senator
TBD

The 16th district consists of parts of Maricopa, Pima, and Pinal County. The incumbent is three-term Republican T. J. Shope, who is eligible to run for re-election.

In 2024, Senator Shope defeated Democratic nominee Stacey Seaman 56.0% to 44.0%.

=== Republican primary ===
==== Nominee ====
- T. J. Shope, incumbent state senator (2020–present)

==== Fundraising ====
Campaign finance reports as of March 2026
Candidate	Raised	Spent	Cash on hand
T.J. Shope (R)	$143,819.06	$29,160.04	$114,659.02
Source: See the Money

==== Results ====
Republican primary results
Party	Candidate	Votes	%
Republican	Thomas "T.J." Shope	17,012	100.00
Total votes		17,012	100.0

=== Democratic primary ===
==== Nominee ====
- Elaine Aldrete, former treasurer for Keith Seaman

==== Fundraising ====
Campaign finance reports as of March 2026
Candidate	Raised	Spent	Cash on hand
Elaine Aldrete (D)	$2,130.00	$433.63	$1,696.37
Source: See the Money

==== Results ====
Democratic primary results
Party	Candidate	Votes	%
Democratic	Elaine Aldrete	14,239	100.00
Total votes		14,239	100.0

== District 17 ==
2026 Arizona's 17th legislative district Senate election

Nominee	Chris King	Edgar Soto
Party	Republican	Democratic
State Senator before election
Vince Leach
Republican
Elected State Senator
TBD

The 17th district consists of northeastern Pima County, as well as a small part of Pinal County. The incumbent is four-term Republican Vince Leach, who is eligible to run for re-election due to serving non-consecutive terms but has opted to retire.

In 2024, Leach defeated Democratic nominee John McLean 51% to 49% after winning the Republican primary against incumbent Senator Justine Wadsack.

=== Republican primary ===
==== Nominee ====
- Chris King, at-large member of the Vail Unified School District (2021–present)

==== Eliminated in primary ====
- Anthony Dunham, veteran and retired law enforcement officer

==== Fundraising ====
Campaign finance reports as of March 2026
Candidate	Raised	Spent	Cash on hand
Anthony Dunham (R)	$0.00	$0.00	$0.00
Chris King (R)	$39,126.77	$9,456.01	$29,584.58
Source: See the Money

==== Results ====
Republican primary results
Party	Candidate	Votes	%
Republican	Christopher King	19,795	62.91
Republican	Anthony Dunham	11,672	37.09
Total votes		31,467	100.0

=== Democratic primary ===
==== Nominee ====
- Edgar Soto, vice president of the Pima Community College Desert Vista campus (2018–present)

==== Fundraising ====
Campaign finance reports as of March 2026
Candidate	Raised	Spent	Cash on hand
Edgar Soto (D)	$0.00	$0.00	$0.00
Source: See the Money

==== Results ====
Democratic primary results
Party	Candidate	Votes	%
Democratic	Edgar Soto	27,771	100.00
Total votes		27,771	100.0

== District 18 ==
2026 Arizona's 18th legislative district Senate election
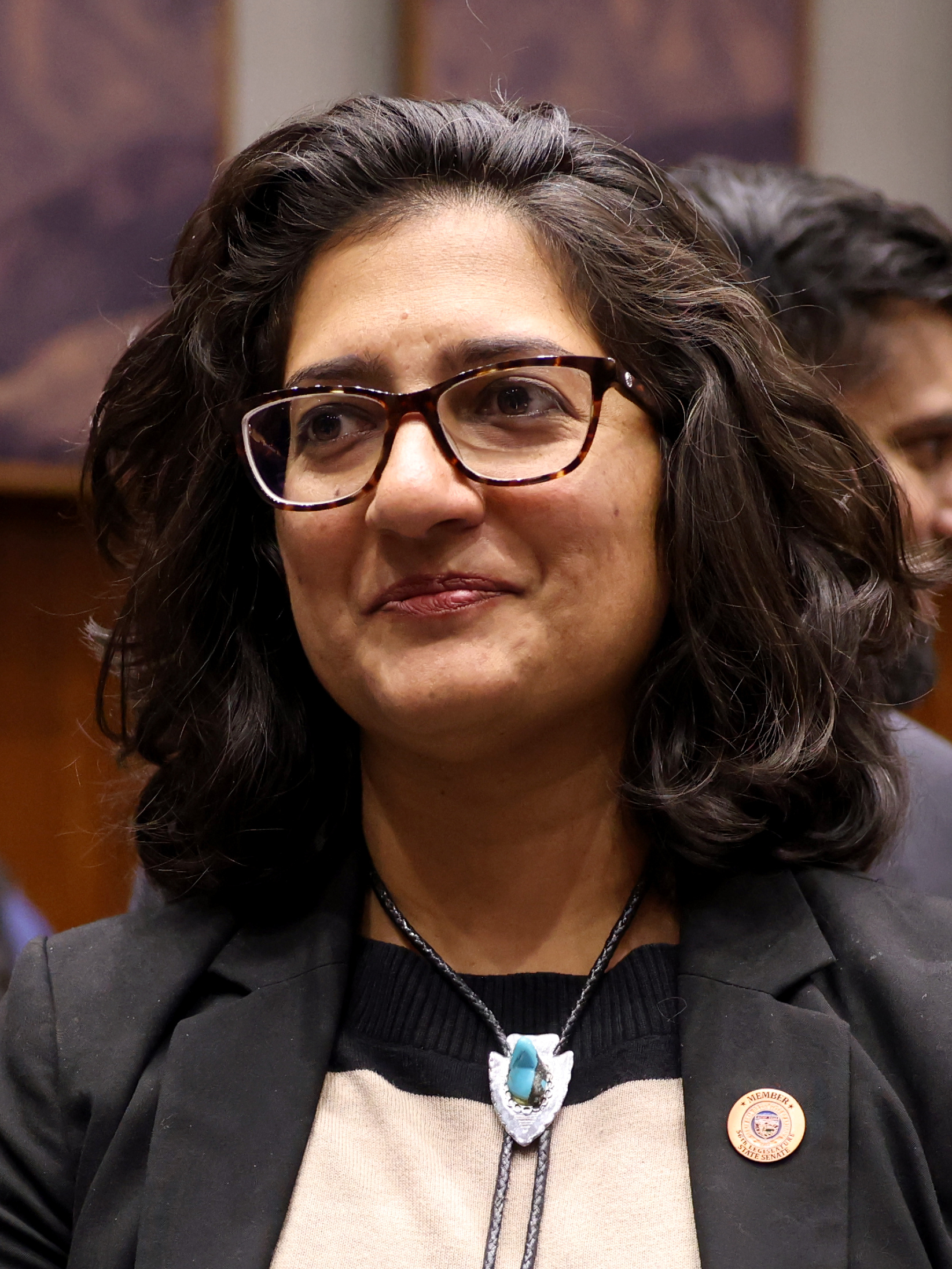

Nominee	Priya Sundareshan	Douglas Everett
Party	Democratic	Republican
State Senator before election
Priya Sundareshan
Democratic
Elected State Senator
TBD

The 18th district is located in Pima County, containing Casas Adobes, Catalina Foothills, and parts of northern Tucson. The incumbent is two-term Democrat and Minority Leader of the Senate Priya Sundareshan, who is eligible to run for re-election.

In 2024, Senator Sundareshan was unopposed in her re-election bid.

=== Democratic primary ===
==== Nominee ====
- Priya Sundareshan, incumbent state senator (2023–present)

==== Results ====
Democratic primary results
Party	Candidate	Votes	%
Democratic	Priya Sundareshan	28,891	100.00
Total votes		28,891	100.0

=== Republican primary ===
==== Nominee ====
- Douglas Everett, retired engineer

==== Fundraising ====
Campaign finance reports as of March 2026
Candidate	Raised	Spent	Cash on hand
Douglas Everett (R)	$23,189.16	$1,397.61	$1,250.00
Source: See the Money

==== Results ====
Republican primary results
Party	Candidate	Votes	%
Republican	Douglas Everett	15,215	100.00
Total votes		15,215	100.0

== District 19 ==
2026 Arizona's 19th legislative district Senate election
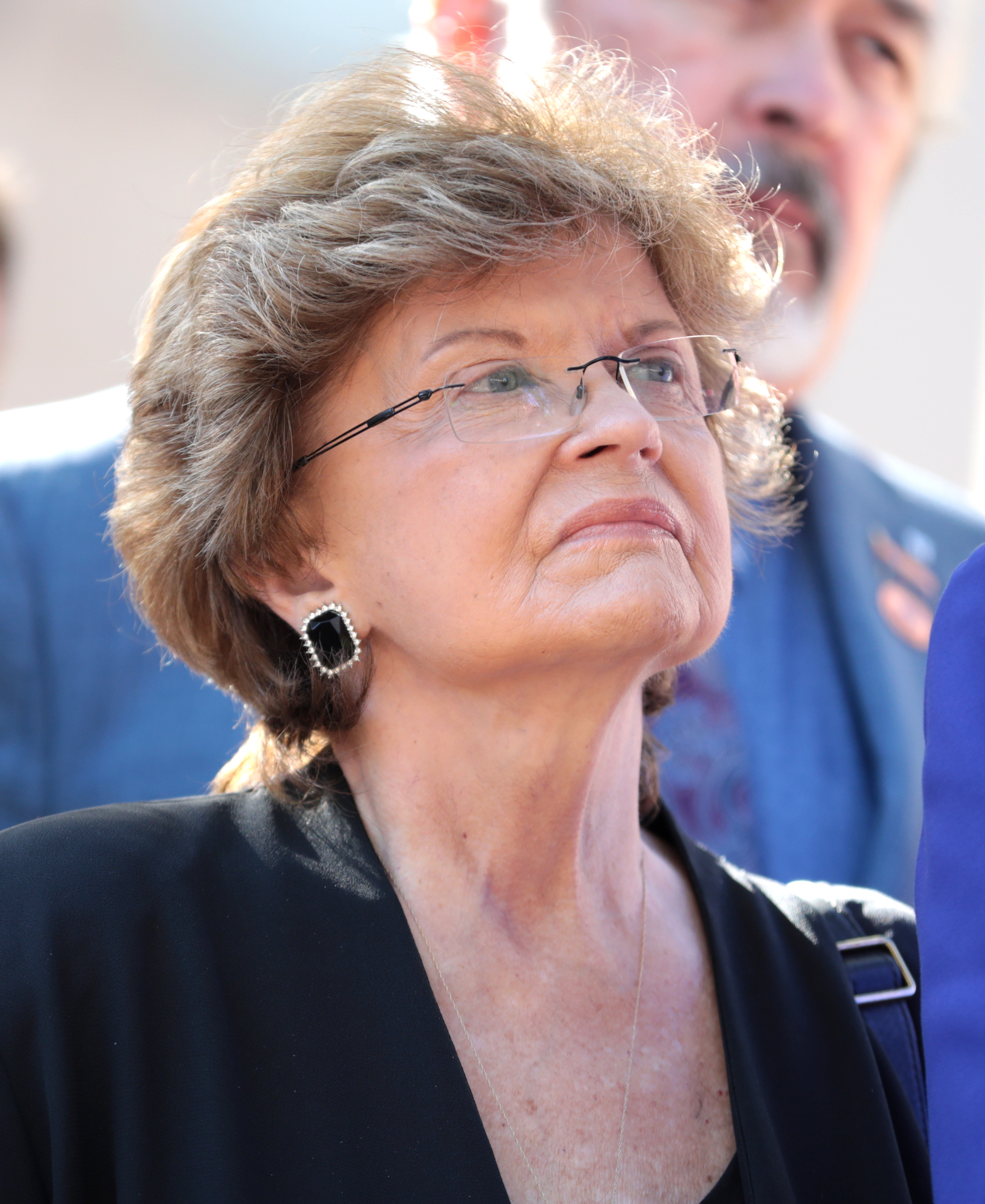

Nominee	Gail Griffin	Bob Karp
Party	Republican	Democratic
State Senator before election
David Gowan
Republican
Elected State Senator
TBD

The 19th district consists of all of Greenlee County, most of Cochise and Graham County, and parts of Pima and Santa Cruz County.The incumbent is four-term Republican David Gowan, who is ineligible to run for re-election.

In 2024, Senator Gowan defeated Democratic nominee Bob Karp 62.6% to 37.4%.

=== Republican primary ===
==== Nominee ====
- Gail Griffin, incumbent state representative for this district and the 14th district (2019–present)

==== Fundraising ====
Campaign finance reports as of March 2026
Candidate	Raised	Spent	Cash on hand
Gail Griffin (R)	$84,400.00	$14,382.89	$69,736.11
Source: See the Money

==== Results ====
Republican primary results
Party	Candidate	Votes	%
Republican	Gail Griffin	25,115	100.00
Total votes		25,115	100.0

=== Democratic primary ===
==== Nominee ====
- Bob Karp '(write-in)'

==== Did not file ====
- Ryan Slawson, small business owner

==== Fundraising ====
Campaign finance reports as of March 2026
Candidate	Raised	Spent	Cash on hand
Ryan Slawson (D)	$0.00	$0.00	$0.00
Source: See the Money

==== Results ====
Democratic primary results
Party	Candidate	Votes	%
Democratic	Bob Karp (Write-in)	2,145	100.00
Total votes		2,145	100.0

== District 20 ==
2026 Arizona's 20th legislative district Senate election
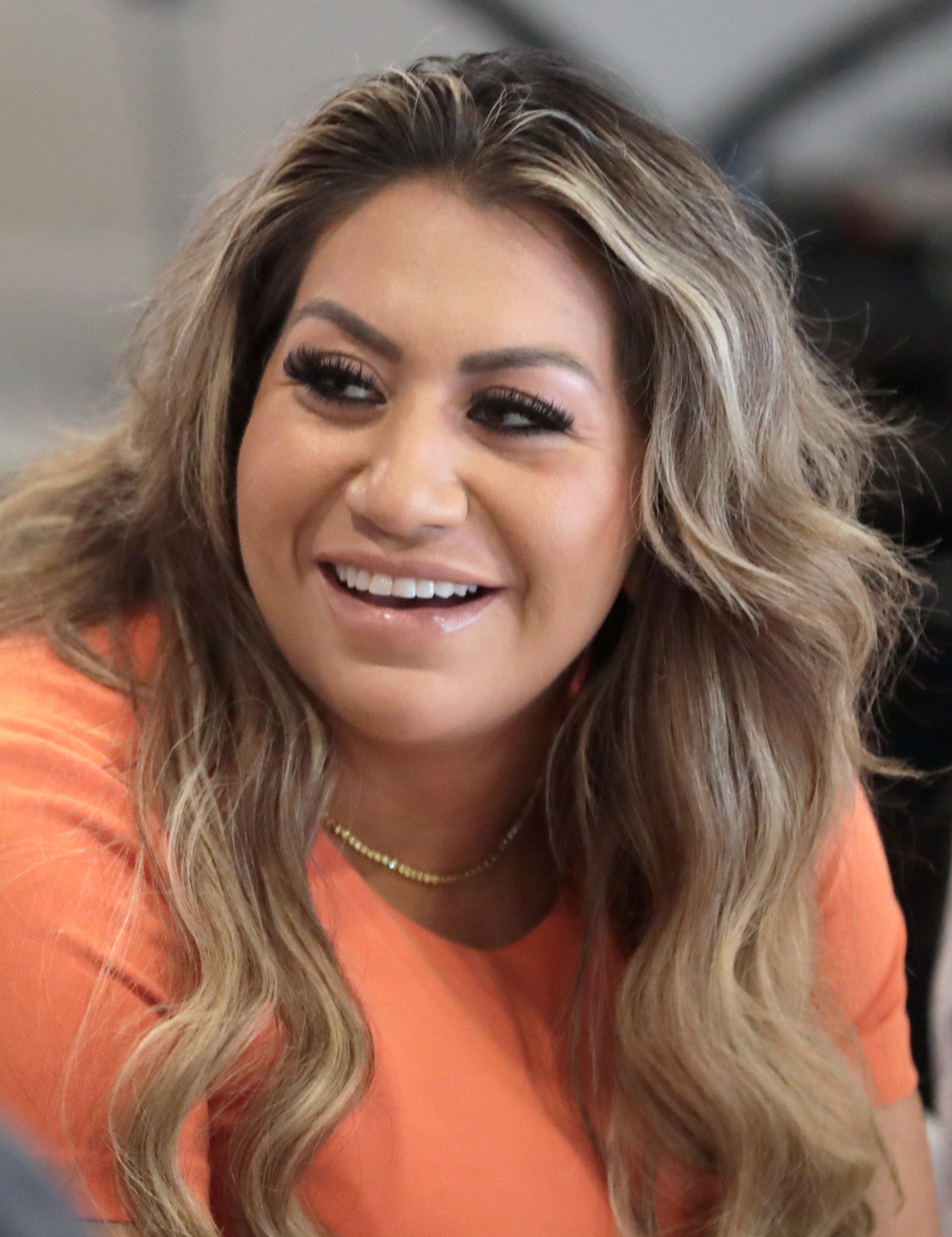
Nominee	Alma Hernandez
Party	Democratic
State Senator before election
Sally Ann Gonzales
Democratic
Elected State Senator
TBD

The 20th district is located in Pima County, and consists of all of Flowing Wells, South Tucson, and Valencia West, most of Drexel Heights and northwest Tucson, and a small part of Tucson Mountains.The incumbent is four-term Democrat Sally Ann Gonzales, who is ineligible to run for re-election.

In 2024, Senator Gonzales was unopposed in her re-election bid.

=== Democratic primary ===
==== Nominee ====
- Alma Hernandez, incumbent state representative from the 3rd and 20th district (2019–present)

==== Eliminated in primary ====
- Rocque Perez, former member of the Tucson City Council (2025)

==== Fundraising ====
Campaign finance reports as of March 2026
Candidate	Raised	Spent	Cash on hand
Alma Hernandez (D)	$70,762.51	$54,912.67	$15,849.84
Rocque Perez (D)	$10,204.51	$6,254.51	$3,730.74
Source: See the Money

==== Results ====
Results by precinct Hernandez: 50–60% 60–70%; 70–80%; Perez: 50–60% 60–70%; 70–80%

Democratic primary results
Party	Candidate	Votes	%
Democratic	Alma Hernandez	11,184	51.38
Democratic	Rocque Perez	10,584	48.62
Total votes		21,768	100.0

== District 21 ==
2026 Arizona's 21st legislative district Senate election
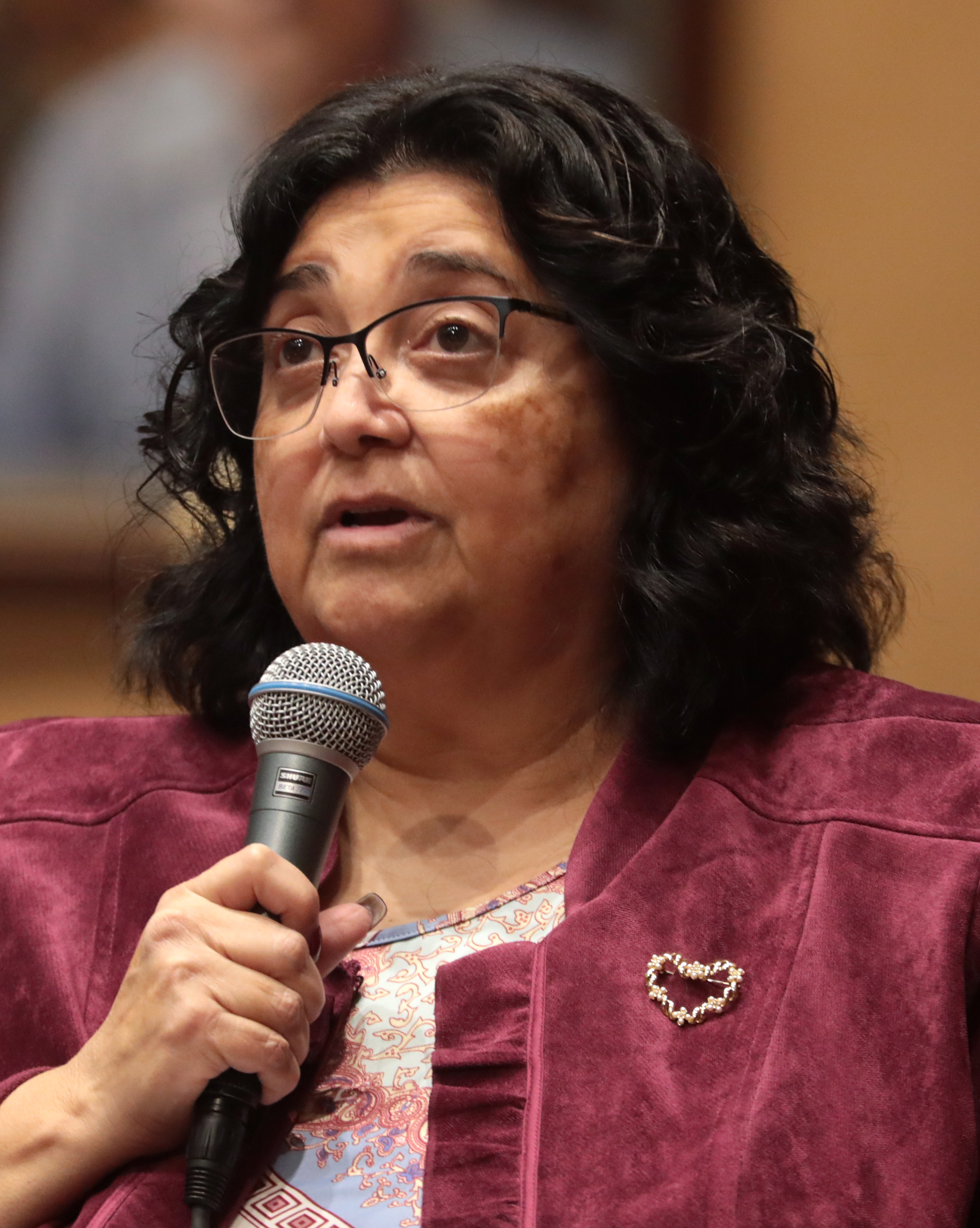

Nominee	Rosanna Gabaldón	Esteban Flores
Party	Democratic	Republican
State Senator before election
Rosanna Gabaldón
Democratic
Elected State Senator
TBD

The 21st district consists of parts of Cochise, Pima, and Santa Cruz County. The incumbent is three-term Democrat Rosanna Gabaldón, who is eligible to run for re-election.

In 2024, Senator Gabaldón was unopposed in her re-election bid.

=== Democratic primary ===
==== Nominee ====
- Rosanna Gabaldón, incumbent state senator (2021–present)

==== Fundraising ====
Campaign finance reports as of March 2026
Candidate	Raised	Spent	Cash on hand
Rosanna Gabaldón (D)	$19,719.00	$18,053.26	$15,994.85
Source: See the Money

==== Results ====
Democratic primary results
Party	Candidate	Votes	%
Democratic	Rosanna Gabaldón	18,920	100.00
Total votes		18,920	100.0

=== Republican primary ===
==== Nominee ====
- Esteban Flores, public servant

==== Fundraising ====
Campaign finance reports as of March 2026
Candidate	Raised	Spent	Cash on hand
Esteban Flores (R)	$147.38	$0.00	$147.38
Source: See the Money

==== Results ====
Republican primary results
Party	Candidate	Votes	%
Republican	Esteban Flores	7,785	100.00
Total votes		7,785	100.0

== District 22 ==
2026 Arizona's 22nd legislative district Senate election
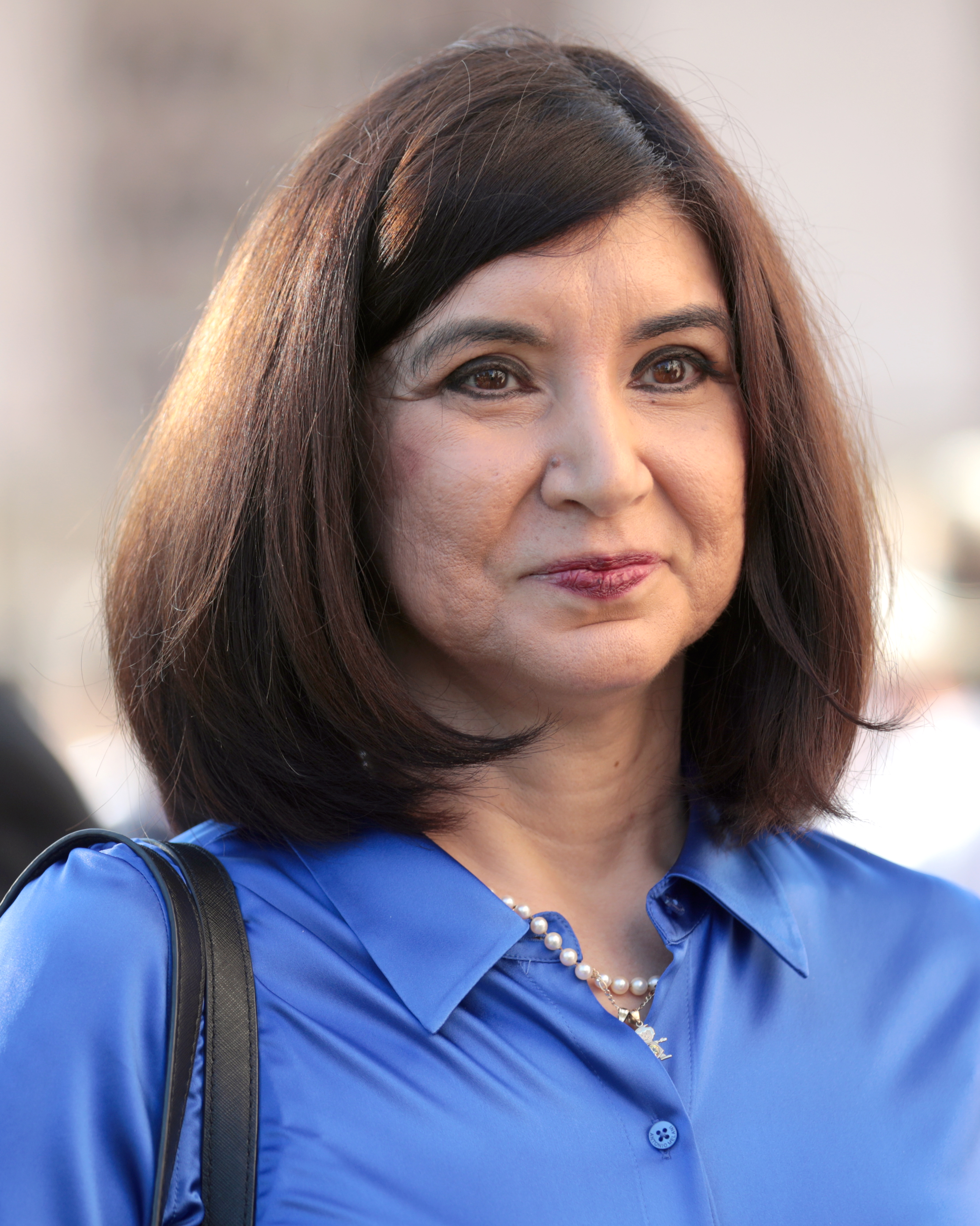
Nominee	Eva Diaz
Party	Democratic
State Senator before election
Eva Diaz
Democratic
Elected State Senator
TBD

The 22nd district is located in Maricopa County and contains all of Avondale and Tolleson, as well as parts of Phoenix, Glendale, and Goodyear. The incumbent is two-term Democrat Eva Diaz, who is eligible to run for re-election.

In 2024, Senator Diaz defeated Republican nominee Steve Robinson 64.6% to 35.4%.

=== Democratic primary ===
==== Nominee ====
- Eva Diaz, incumbent state senator (2023–present)

==== Results ====
Democratic primary results
Party	Candidate	Votes	%
Democratic	Eva Diaz	10,499	100.00
Total votes		10,499	100.0

== District 23 ==
2026 Arizona's 23rd legislative district Senate election
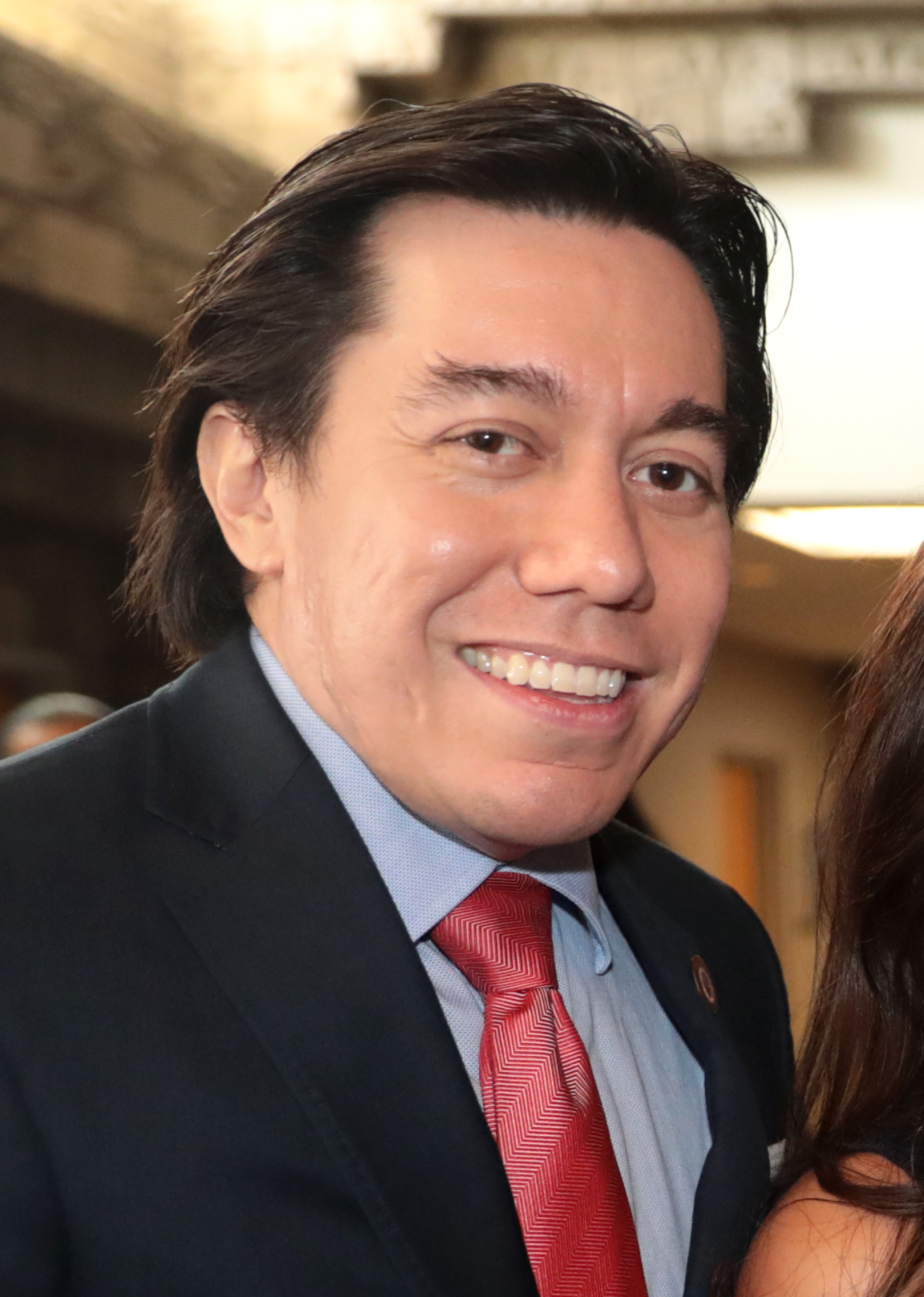

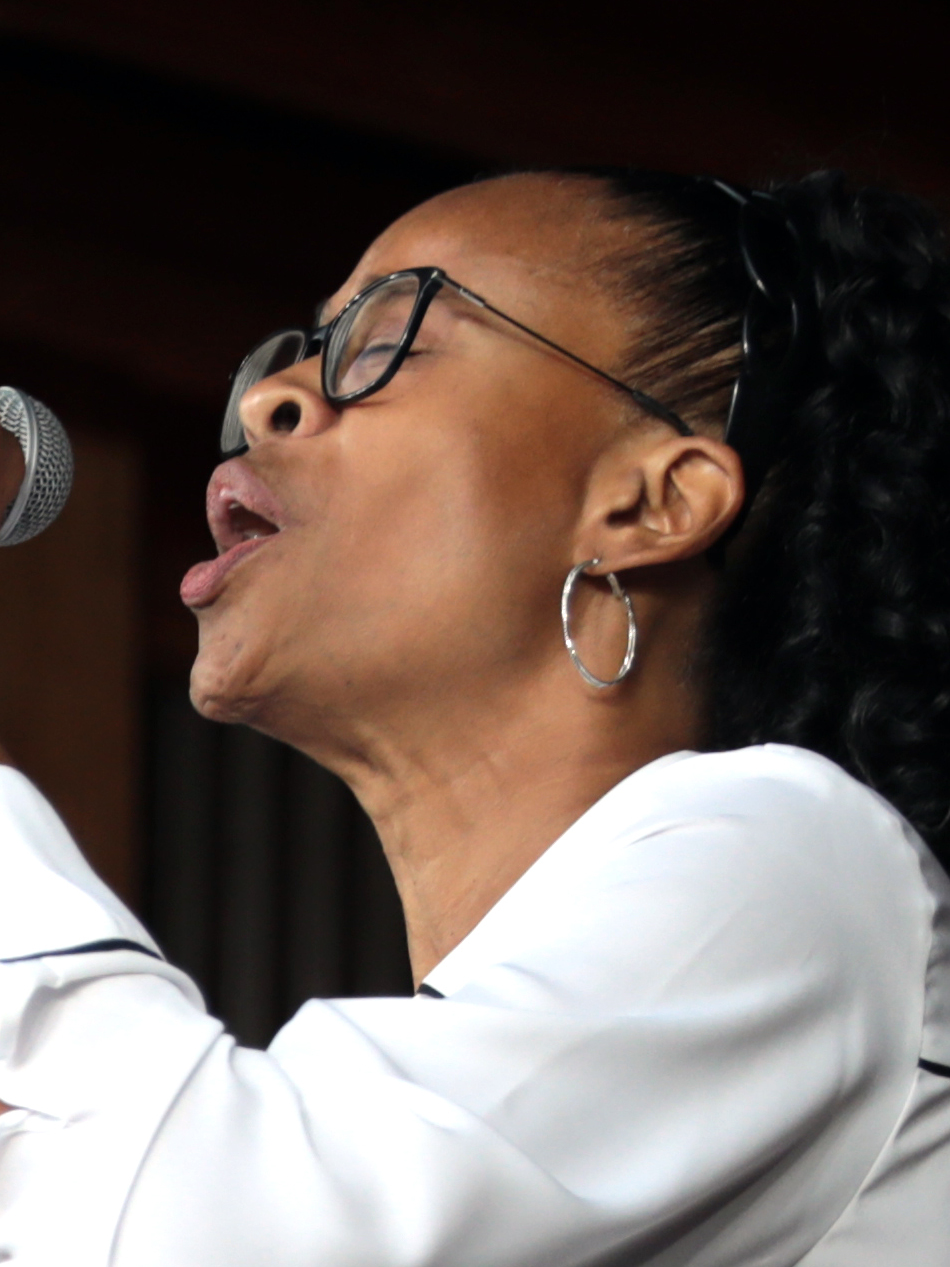
Nominee	Brian Fernandez	Michelle Altherr
Party	Democratic	Republican
State Senator before election
Brian Fernandez
Democratic
Elected State Senator
TBD

The 23rd district contains parts of Maricopa, Pima, Pinal, and Yuma County. The incumbent is two-term Democrat Brian Fernandez, who is eligible to run for re-election.

In 2024, Senator Fernandez defeated Republican nominee Michelle Altherr 53.8% to 46.2%.

=== Democratic primary ===
==== Nominee ====
- Brian Fernandez, incumbent state senator (2023–present)

==== Results ====
Democratic primary results
Party	Candidate	Votes	%
Democratic	Brian Fernandez	12,426	100.00
Total votes		12,426	100.0

=== Republican primary ===
==== Nominee ====
- Michelle Altherr, veteran and nominee for this district in 2024

==== Fundraising ====
Campaign finance reports as of March 2026
Candidate	Raised	Spent	Cash on hand
Michelle Altherr (R)	$6,216.00	$6,419.99	$124.31
Source: See the Money

==== Results ====
Republican primary results
Party	Candidate	Votes	%
Republican	Michelle Altherr	8,563	100.00
Total votes		8,563	100.0

== District 24 ==
2026 Arizona's 24th legislative district Senate election
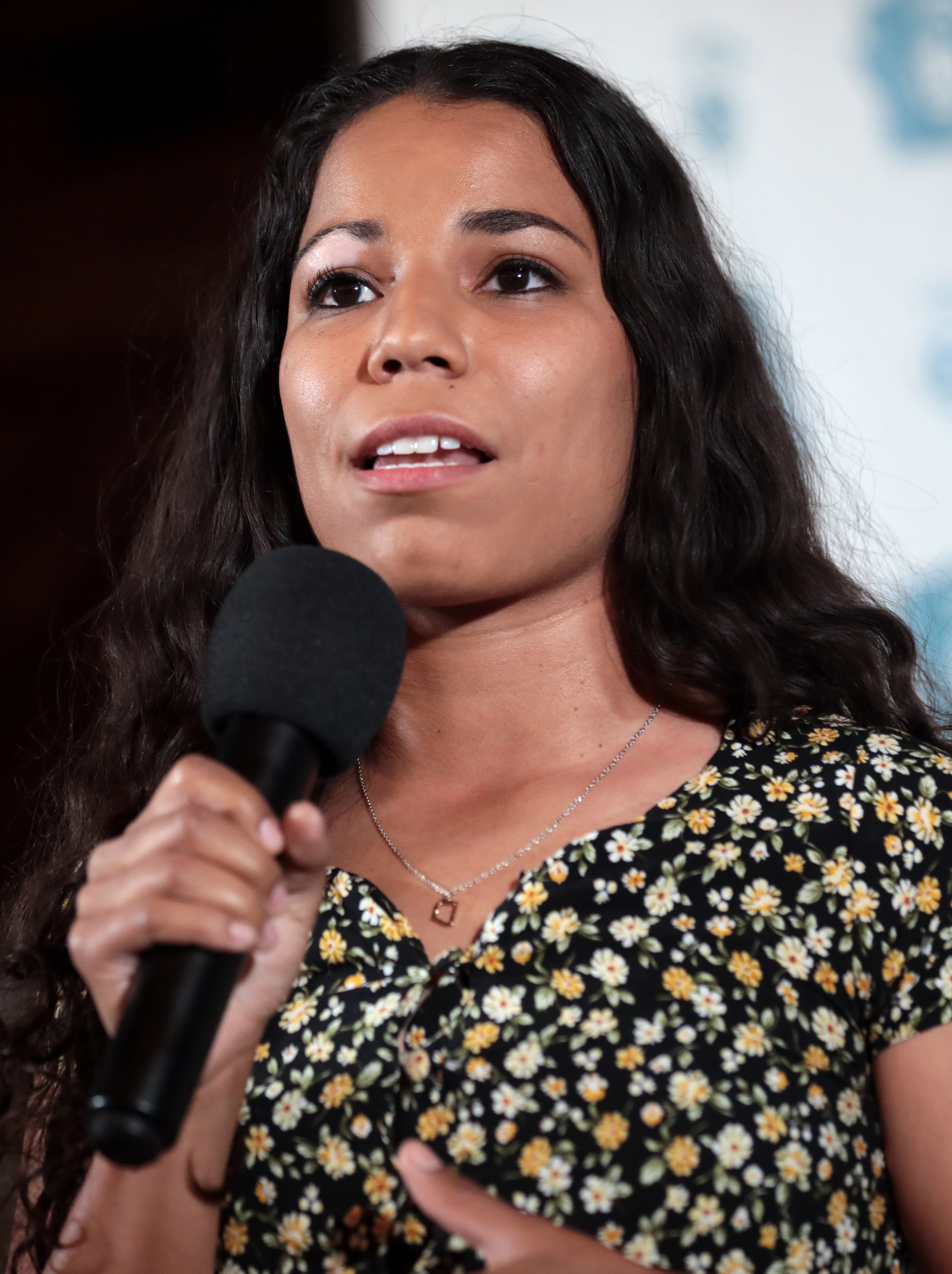

Nominee	Analise Ortiz	Frank Steele
Party	Democratic	Republican
State Senator before election
Analise Ortiz
Democratic
Elected State Senator
TBD

The 24th district is located in Maricopa County and includes parts of Glendale and Phoenix. The incumbent is one-term Democrat Analise Ortiz, who is eligible to run for re-election.

In 2024, Oritz was unopposed in her election bid.

=== Democratic primary ===
==== Nominee ====
- Analise Ortiz, incumbent state senator (2025–present)

==== Results ====
Democratic primary results
Party	Candidate	Votes	%
Democratic	Analise Ortiz	9,938	100.00
Total votes		9,938	100.0

=== Republican primary ===
==== Nominee ====
- Frank Steele, chairman of the Legislative District 24 Republican Party

==== Fundraising ====
Campaign finance reports as of March 2026
Candidate	Raised	Spent	Cash on hand
Frank Steele (R)	$0.00	$0.00	$0.00
Source: See the Money

==== Results ====
Republican primary results
Party	Candidate	Votes	%
Republican	Frank Steele	4,066	100.00
Total votes		4,066	100.0

== District 25 ==
2026 Arizona's 25th legislative district Senate election
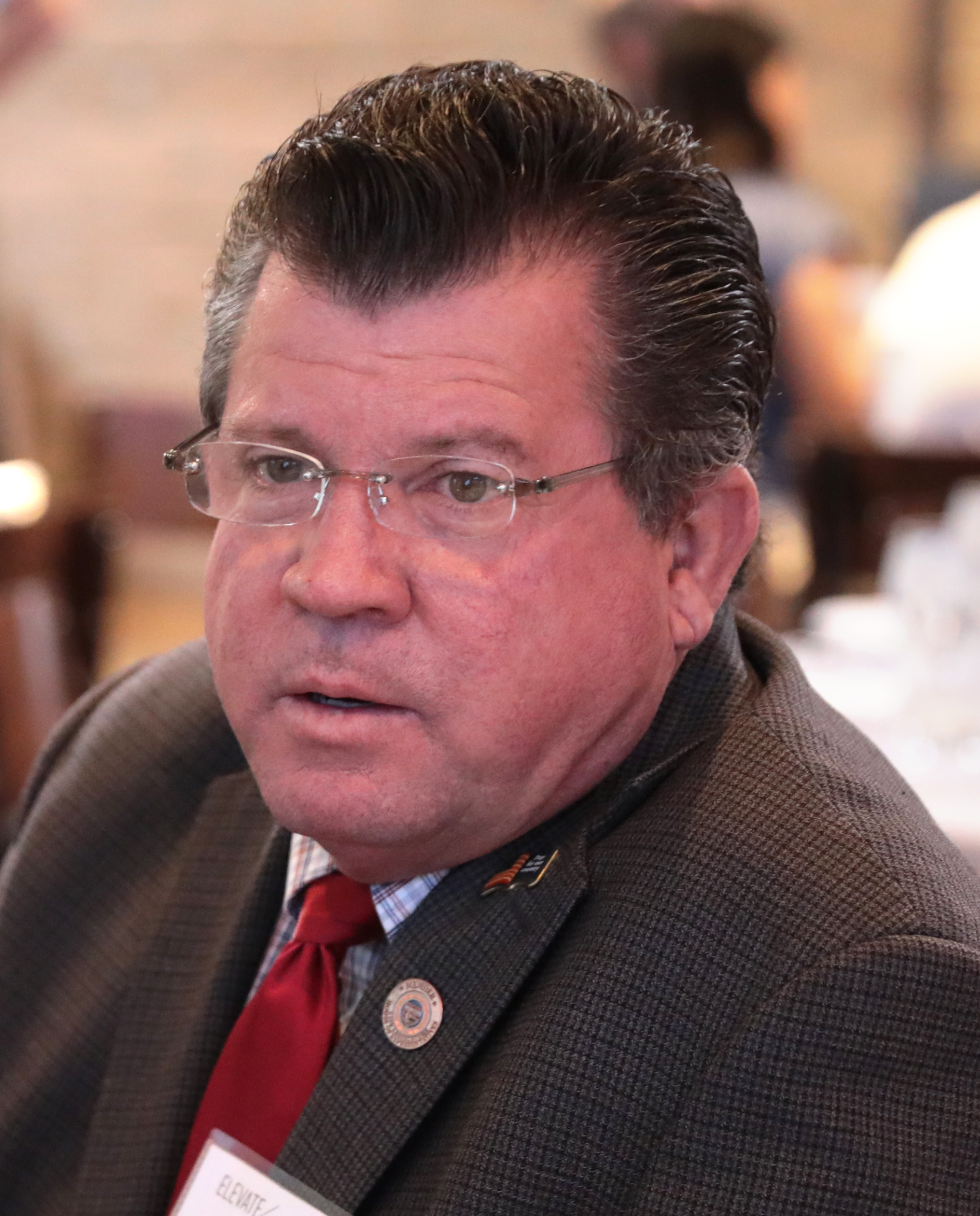

Nominee	Tim Dunn	Laura Huber
Party	Republican	Democratic
State Senator before election
Tim Dunn
Republican
Elected State Senator
TBD

The 25th district contains parts of Maricopa and Yuma County. The incumbent is one-term Republican Tim Dunn, who is eligible to run for re-election.

In 2024, Dunn was unopposed in his election bid.

=== Republican primary ===
==== Nominee ====
- Tim Dunn, incumbent state senator (2025–present)

==== Results ====
Republican primary results
Party	Candidate	Votes	%
Republican	Timothy "Tim" Dunn	22,443	100.00
Total votes		22,443	100.0

=== Democratic primary ===
==== Nominee ====
- Laura Huber, mental health counselor

==== Fundraising ====
Campaign finance reports as of March 2026
Candidate	Raised	Spent	Cash on hand
Laura Huber (D)	$7,066.39	$5,060.51	$543.77
Source: See the Money

==== Results ====
Democratic primary results
Party	Candidate	Votes	%
Democratic	Laura Huber	11,377	100.00
Total votes		11,377	100.0

== District 26 ==
2026 Arizona's 26th legislative district Senate election
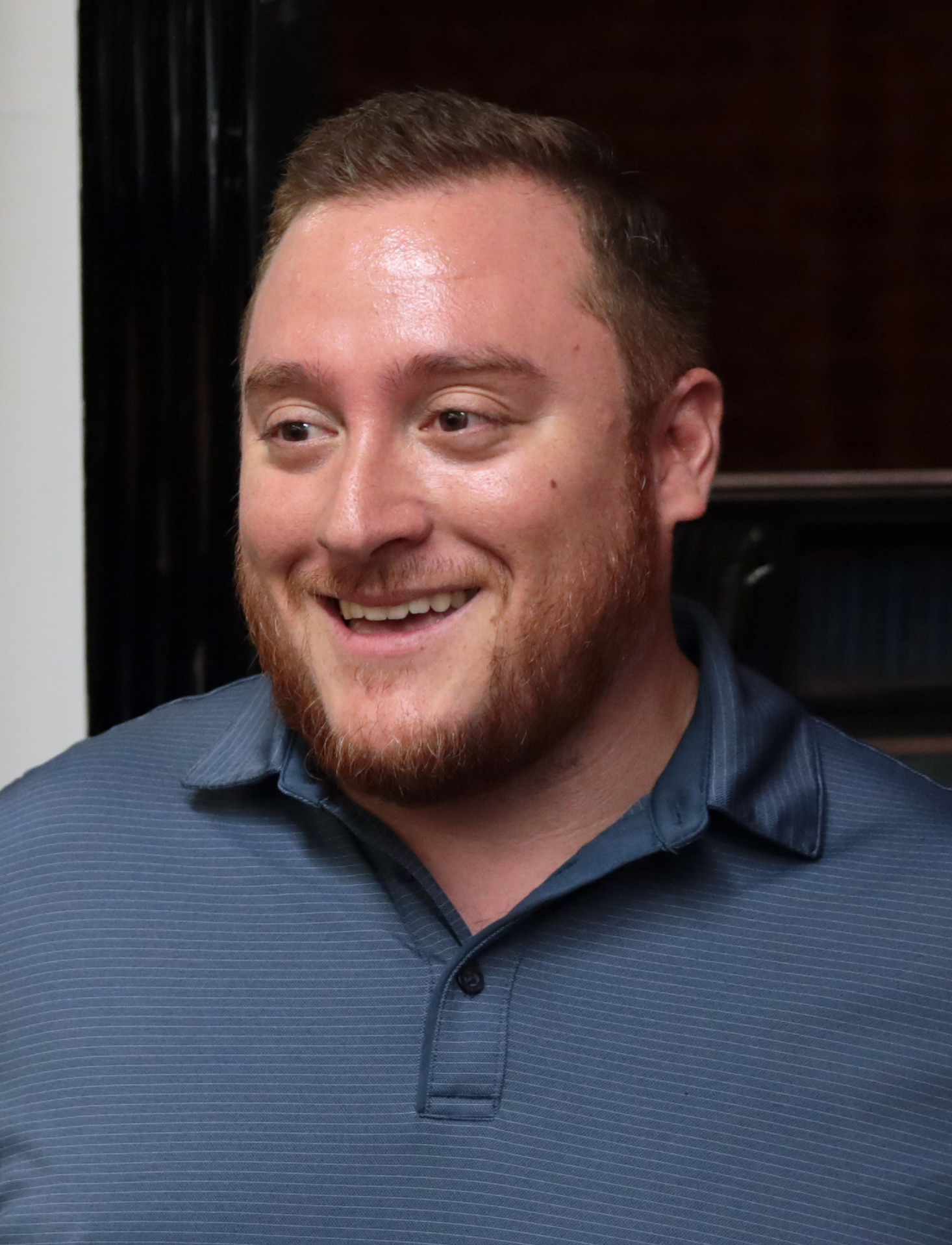

Nominee	Flavio Bravo	Jim Bishop
Party	Democratic	Republican
State Senator before election
Flavio Bravo
Democratic
Elected State Senator
TBD

The 26th district is located in Maricopa County, and is mostly contained in a portion of western Phoenix along with a small part of Glendale. The incumbent is two-term Democrat Flavio Bravo, who is eligible to run for re-election.

In 2024, Senator Bravo defeated Republican nominee Vic Harris 66.3% to 33.7%.

=== Democratic primary ===
==== Nominee ====
- Flavio Bravo, incumbent state senator (2023–present)

==== Results ====
Democratic primary results
Party	Candidate	Votes	%
Democratic	Flavio Bravo	7,994	100.00
Total votes		7,994	100.0

=== Republican primary ===
==== Nominee ====
- Jim Bishop

==== Results ====
Republican primary results
Party	Candidate	Votes	%
Republican	Jim Bishop	3,153	100.00
Total votes		3,153	100.0

== District 27 ==
2026 Arizona's 27th legislative district Senate election
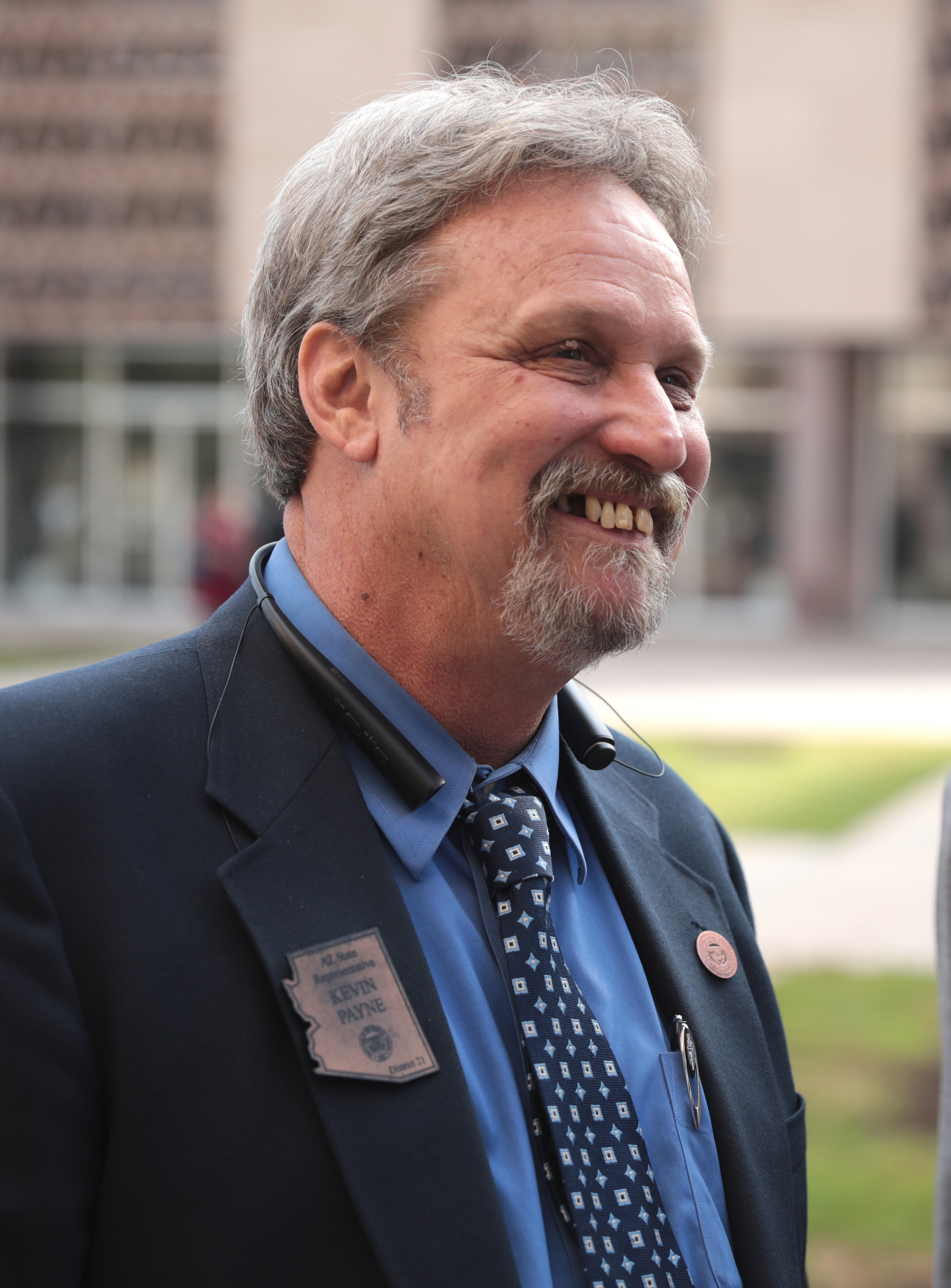
Nominee	Kevin Payne	Kyle Clayton
Party	Republican	Democratic
State Senator before election
Kevin Payne
Republican
Elected State Senator
TBD

The 27th district is located in Maricopa County, and contains parts of Glendale, Peoria, and Phoenix. The incumbent is one-term Republican Kevin Payne, who is eligible to run for re-election.

In 2024, Payne was unopposed in his election bid.

=== Republican primary ===
==== Nominee ====
- Kevin Payne, incumbent state senator (2025–present)

==== Eliminated in primary ====
- Anthony Kern, former state senator from the 27th district (2023–2025)

==== Results ====
Republican primary results
Party	Candidate	Votes	%
Republican	Kevin Payne	8,536	50.88
Republican	Anthony Kern	8,240	49.12
Total votes		16,776	100.0

=== Democratic primary ===
==== Nominee ====
- Kyle Clayton, realtor and board president of the Washington Elementary School District

==== Fundraising ====
Campaign finance reports as of March 2026
Candidate	Raised	Spent	Cash on hand
Kyle Clayton (D)	$1,000.00	$57.72	$942.28
Source: See the Money

==== Results ====
Democratic primary results
Party	Candidate	Votes	%
Democratic	Kyle Clayton	12,382	100.00
Total votes		12,382	100.0

== District 28 ==
2026 Arizona's 28th legislative district Senate election
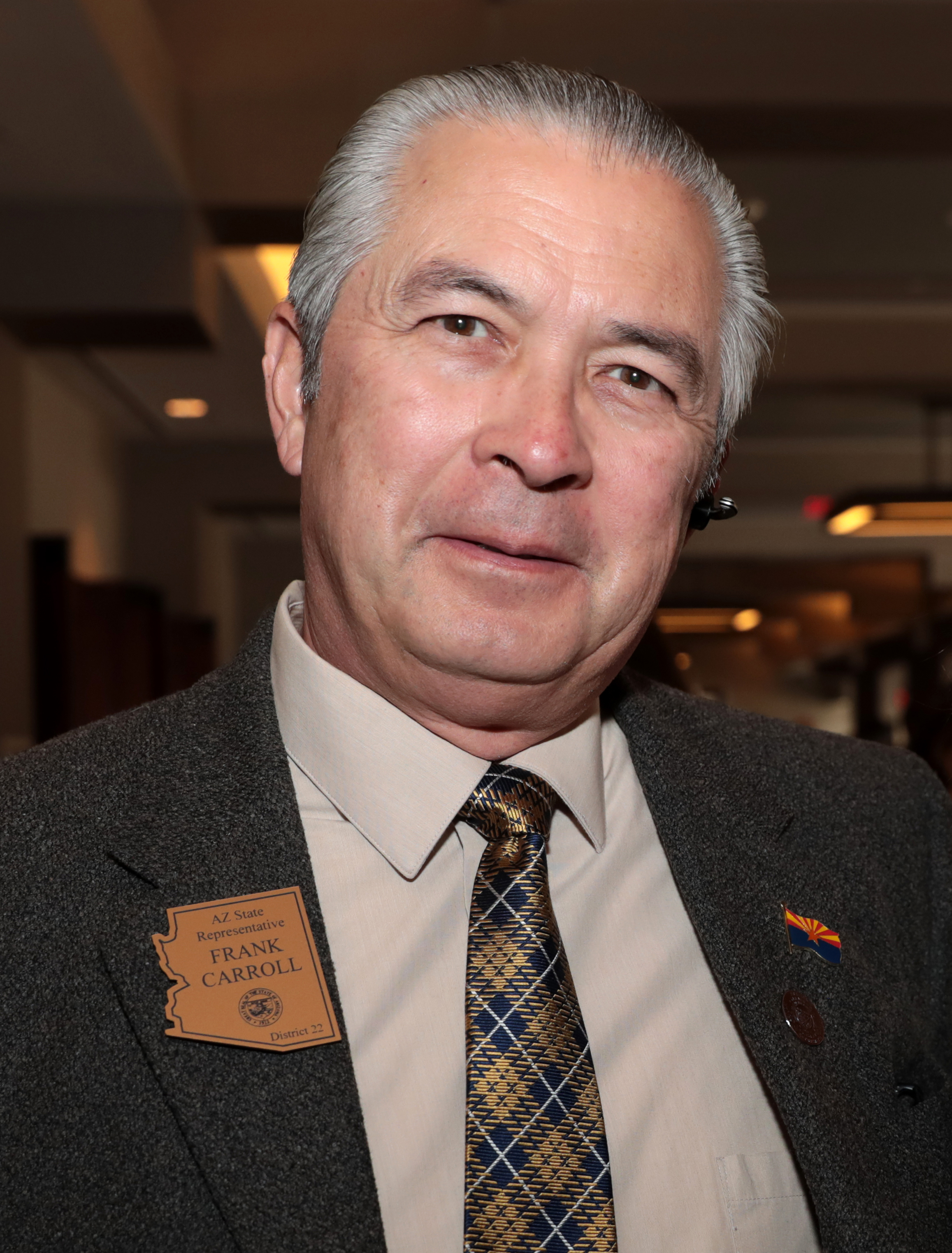

Nominee	Frank Carroll	Michael Braun
Party	Republican	Democratic
State Senator before election
Frank Carroll
Republican
Elected State Senator
TBD

The 28th district is located in Maricopa County, and contains Sun City and Sun City West, most of Peoria, and parts of Phoenix and Surprise. The incumbent is two-term Republican Frank Carroll, who is eligible to run for re-election.

In 2024, Senator Carroll defeated Democratic write-in candidate Shauna Dempsey 98.9% to 1.1%.

=== Republican primary ===
==== Nominee ====
- Frank Carroll, incumbent state senator (2023–present)

==== Results ====
Republican primary results
Party	Candidate	Votes	%
Republican	Frank Carroll	32,411	100.00
Total votes		32,411	100.0

=== Democratic primary ===
==== Nominee ====
- Michael Braun

==== Fundraising ====
Campaign finance reports as of March 2026
Candidate	Raised	Spent	Cash on hand
Michael Braun (D)	$810.00	$243.97	$706.14
Source: See the Money

==== Results ====
Democratic primary results
Party	Candidate	Votes	%
Democratic	Michael Braun	18,256	100.00
Total votes		18,256	100.0

== District 29 ==
2026 Arizona's 29th legislative district Senate election
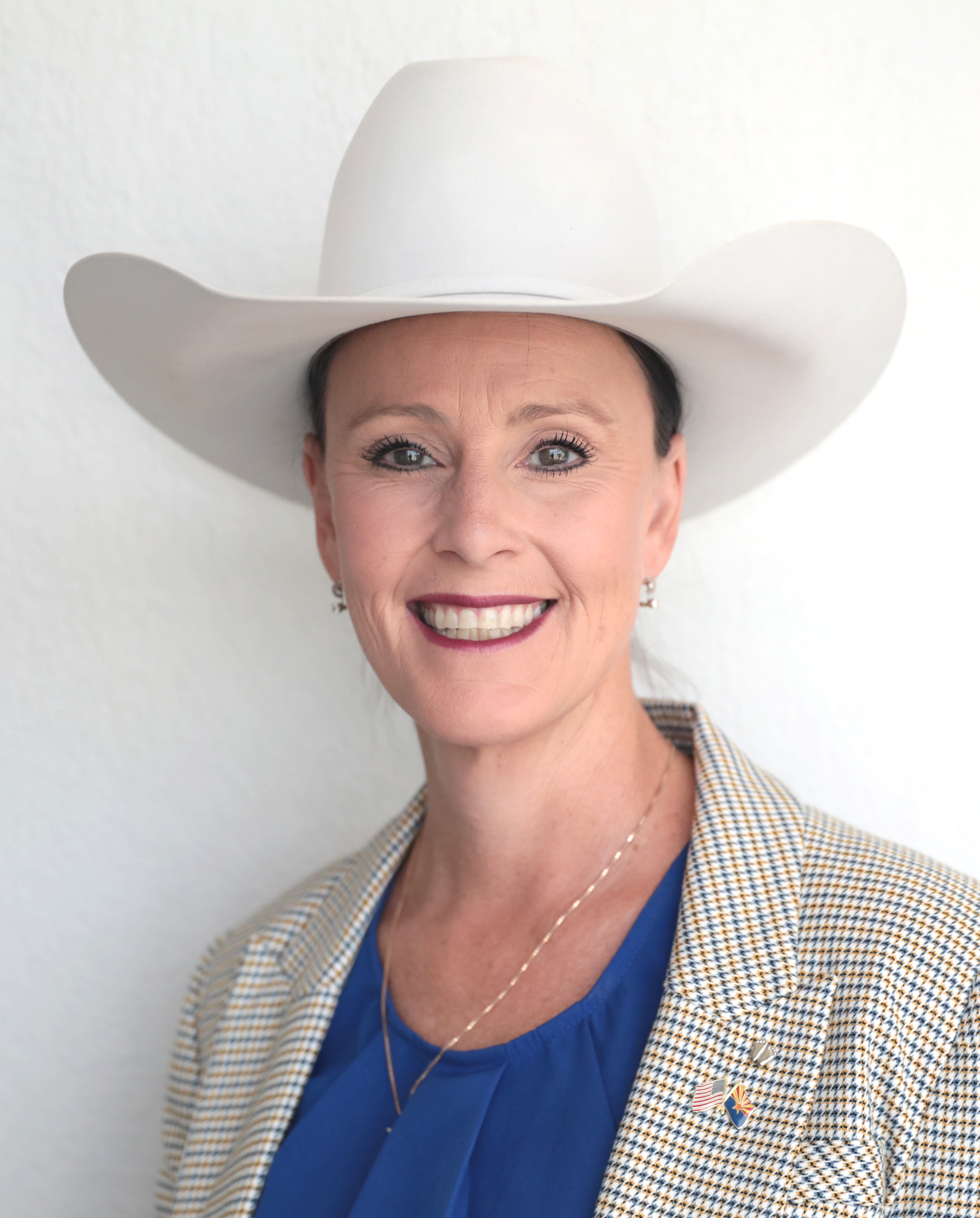

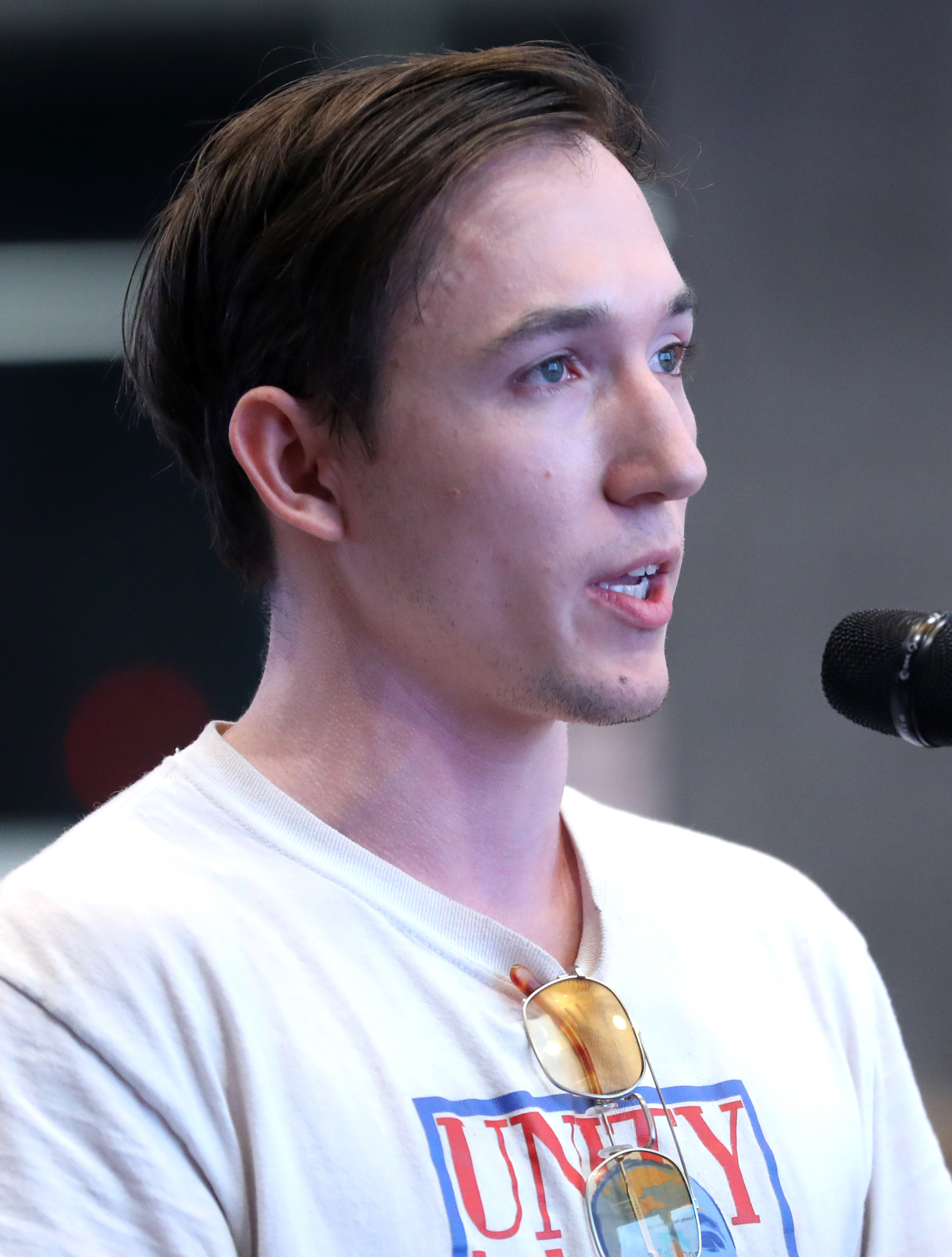
Nominee	Janae Shamp	Eric Stafford
Party	Republican	Democratic
Popular vote	46,975	44,680
Percentage	51.25%	48.75%
- Results by precinct Shamp: 50–60% 60–70% 70–80%; Stafford: 50–60% 60–70% 70–80%
State Senator before election
Janae Shamp
Republican
Elected State Senator
TBD

The 29th district is located in Maricopa County, and contains Circle City, El Mirage, Litchfield Park, Morristown, Youngtown, most of Surprise, and parts of Glendale, Goodyear, and Peoria. The incumbent is two-term Republican and Majority Leader of the Arizona Senate Janae Shamp, who is eligible to run for re-election.

In 2024, Senator Shamp defeated Democratic nominee Eric Stafford 59.3% to 40.7%.

=== Republican primary ===
==== Nominee ====
- Janae Shamp, incumbent state senator (2023–present)

==== Fundraising ====
Campaign finance reports as of March 2026
Candidate	Raised	Spent	Cash on hand
Janae Shamp (R)	$35,452.99	$22,539.67	$147,183.44
Source: See the Money

==== Results ====
Republican primary results
Party	Candidate	Votes	%
Republican	Janae Shamp	21,466	100.00
Total votes		21,466	100.0

=== Democratic primary ===
==== Nominee ====
- Eric Stafford, community organizer and nominee for this district in 2024

==== Fundraising ====
Campaign finance reports as of March 2026
Candidate	Raised	Spent	Cash on hand
Eric Stafford (D)	$25,592.82	$1,644.70	$2,669.38
Source: See the Money

==== Results ====
Democratic primary results
Party	Candidate	Votes	%
Democratic	Eric Stafford	14,015	100.00
Total votes		14,015	100.0

== District 30 ==
2026 Arizona's 30th legislative district Senate election
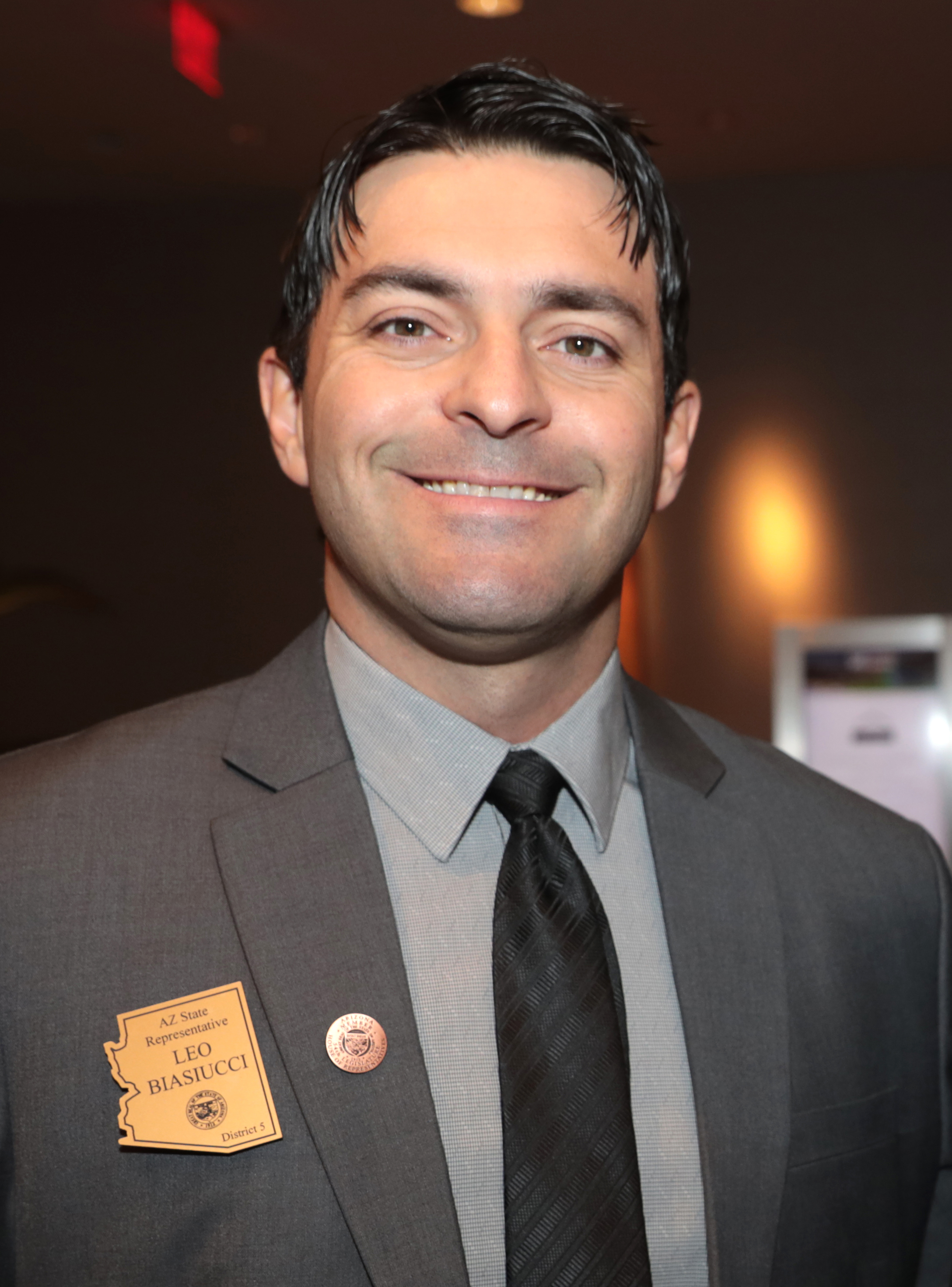
Nominee	Leo Biasiucci
Party	Republican
State Senator before election
Hildy Angius
Republican
Elected State Senator
TBD

The 30th district contains La Paz County, parts of Maricopa and Mohave County, and all of the town of Wickenburg, which includes a very small portion of Yavapai County. The incumbent is one-term Republican Hildy Angius, who is eligible to run for re-election but announced she would run for the Arizona House of Representatives before ultimately opting to retire.

In 2024, Angius defeated Democratic nominee J'aime MorgAine 78.5% to 21.5%.

=== Republican primary ===
==== Nominee ====
- Leo Biasiucci, state representative from the 30th district (2019–present) and former majority leader (2023–2025)

==== Results ====
Republican primary results
Party	Candidate	Votes	%
Republican	Leo Biasiucci	35,730	100.00
Total votes		35,730	100.0
