= 2024 Arizona Senate election =

- November 5, 2024

All 30 seats of the Arizona Senate 16 seats needed for a majority
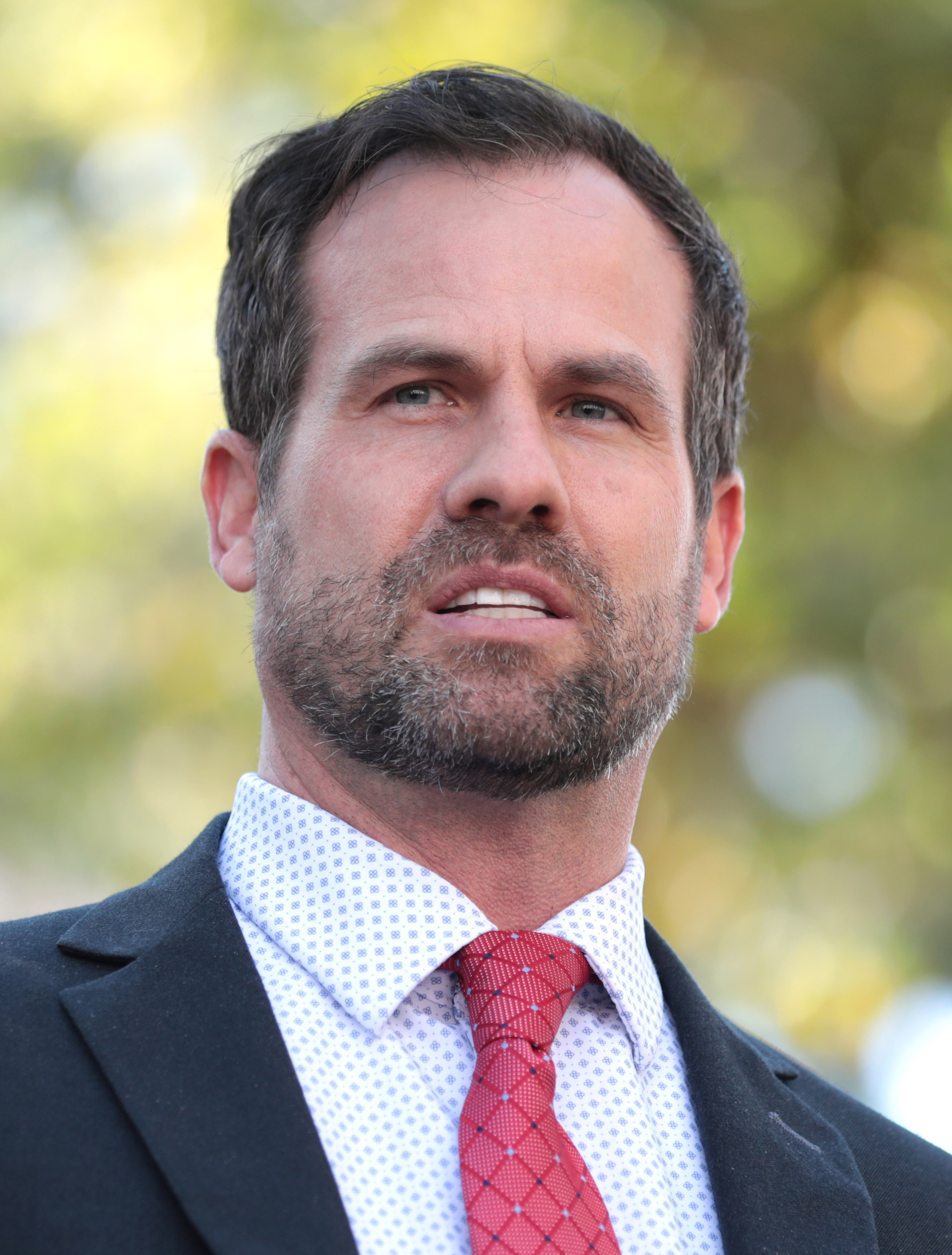

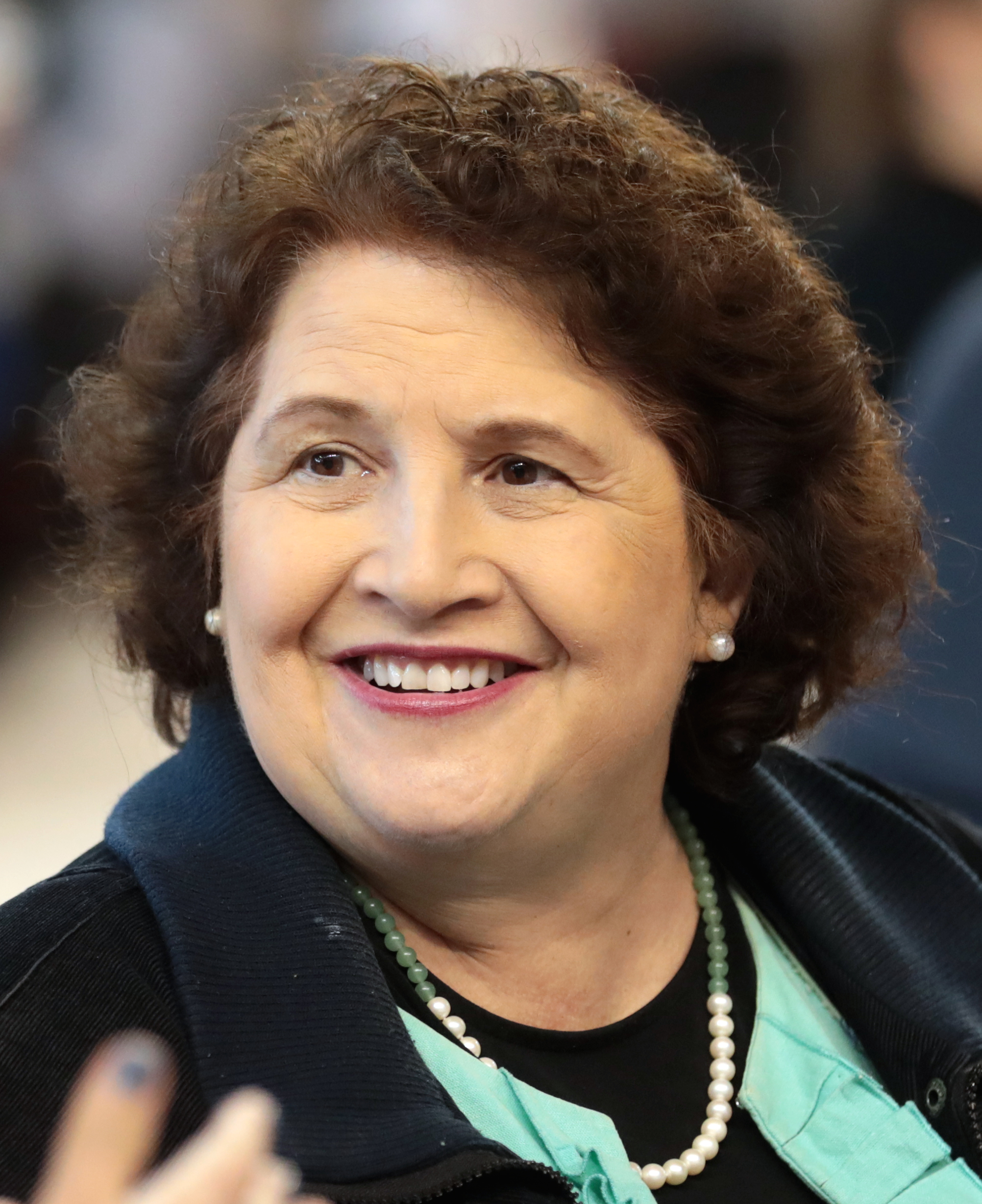
	Majority party	Minority party
Leader	Warren Petersen	Mitzi Epstein (retired as leader)
Party	Republican	Democratic
Leader since	January 9, 2023	March 2, 2023
Leader's seat	14th–Gilbert	12th–Chandler
Last election	16 seats, 53.8%	14 seats, 44.7%
Seats after	17	13
Seat change	▲1	▼1
Popular vote	1,587,610	1,377,346
Percentage	53.4%	46.3%
Swing	▼0.4%	▲1.6%
- Republican gain Republican hold Democratic hold 50–60% 60–70% 70–80% >90% 50–60% 60–70% 70–80% >90%
President of the Senate before election
Warren Petersen
Republican
Elected President of the Senate
Warren Petersen
Republican

The 2024 Arizona Senate election was held on November 5, 2024. Voters elected members of the Arizona Senate in all 30 of the state's legislative districts to serve a two-year term. Primary elections were held on July 30, 2024.

Prior to the elections, the Republican Party held a narrow majority over the Democratic Party, controlling 16 seats to their 14 seats.

== Background ==
=== Partisan Background ===
In the 2020 presidential election, Joe Biden and Donald Trump each won 15 of Arizona's 30 legislative districts. Senate District 13, centered around the city of Chandler, which Biden won by 3% in 2020, was the only district Biden won in 2020 which was currently held by a Republican going into the 2024 Arizona Senate election.

Biden 40–50% 50–60% 60–70% 70–80% / Trump 50–60% 60–70% 70–80%

=== Background ===
Arizona, located along the United States border with Mexico, has a unique political history. Upon its admission to the Union in 1912, the state was dominated by Democrats who had migrated there from the South, and aside from the landslide victories of Republicans Warren G. Harding, Calvin Coolidge, and Herbert Hoover, the state voted for Democrats until 1952, when Dwight Eisenhower carried it, and began a lengthy streak of Republican victories interrupted only by Bill Clinton's narrow victory in 1996. Since then, Arizona was considered a Republican stronghold, but has become a critical swing state and is seen as a purple state. Republican presidential candidate Donald Trump won Arizona by 3.5% in 2016, while Democratic presidential candidate Joe Biden prevailed by 0.3% in 2020.

The Arizona Democratic Party has not won outright control of either state legislative chamber since the 1990s. The last time the party won control of both chambers was in the 1960s. Since then, the state's trend towards Democrats and a consolidated effort on flipping control of the legislature has made this election seen as a tossup with both parties having an equal chance to win control of one or both chambers.

=== Campaign ===
This election is expected to be one of the most competitive state legislative races in the 2024 election cycle. Most ratings suggest the race to be a toss-up or having Democrats as the slight favorite to win the chamber. Additionally, the state Democratic Party's fundraising advantage is also expected to play a major role in which party wins control of the chamber. If Democrats won both chambers, it would have been the first time that Democrats had a trifecta in the state since 1966.

== Predictions ==
=== Statewide ===
Source	Ranking	As of
270toWin	Tilt D (flip)	November 1, 2024
CNalysis	Tilt D (flip)	October 31, 2024
Sabato's Crystal Ball	Tossup	June 18, 2024

=== Competitive districts ===
District	Incumbent	Last Result	CNalysis November 2024
2nd	Shawnna Bolick (Note: Republican Shawnna Bolick was appointed to the Senate to fill the seat after Steve Kaiser resigned.)	51.84% R	Tilt D (flip)
4th	Christine Marsh	50.48% D	Tilt D
9th	Eva Burch	52.47% D	Likely D
13th	J. D. Mesnard	51.73% R	Lean R
16th	T. J. Shope	55.71% R	Very Likely R
17th	Justine Wadsack	51.24% R	Tilt D (flip)

== Overview ==
Party	Candidates	Votes		Seats		
Party	Candidates	No.	%	Before	After	+/–
Republican	25	1,587,610	53.40	16	17	▲1
Democratic	26	1,377,346	46.33	14	13	▼1
Green	1	2,076	0.07	0	0	Steady
Independent	1	6,061	0.20	0	0	Steady
Total		2,973,093	100.00	30	30	

=== Closest races ===
Seats where the margin of victory was under 10%:

1. State Senate district 17, 2%
2. State Senate district 9, 3.4%
3. State Senate district 2, 3.67%
4. State Senate district 4, 3.8% (gain)
5. State Senate district 13, 6.2%
6. State Senate district 23, 7.6%

== Retiring incumbents ==
=== Republicans ===
- District 25: Sine Kerr was term-limited.
- District 27: Anthony Kern ran for the United States House of Representatives.
- District 30: Sonny Borrelli was term-limited.

=== Democrats ===
- District 8: Juan Mendez was term-limited and ran for the Arizona House of Representatives.
- District 24: Anna Hernandez ran for the Phoenix City Council.

== Incumbents defeated ==
=== In primaries ===
==== Republicans ====
- District 1: Ken Bennett lost renomination to Mark Finchem.
- District 17: Justine Wadsack lost renomination to Vince Leach.

=== In general election ===
==== Democrats ====
- District 4: Christine Marsh was defeated by Republican Carine Werner.

== Summary of results by district ==
* – Incumbent lost renomination

† – Incumbent not seeking re-election

District	2020 pres.	Incumbent	Party	Elected senator	Outcome
1st	R +28.6	Ken Bennett*	Rep	Mark Finchem	Rep
2nd	R +2.1	Shawnna Bolick	Rep	Shawnna Bolick	Rep
3rd	R +21.5	John Kavanagh	Rep	John Kavanagh	Rep
4th	D +0.9	Christine Marsh	Dem	Carine Werner	Rep
5th	D +39.8	Lela Alston	Dem	Lela Alston	Dem
6th	D +33.1	Theresa Hatathlie	Dem	Theresa Hatathlie	Dem
7th	R +25.3	Wendy Rogers	Rep	Wendy Rogers	Rep
8th	D +28.8	Juan Mendez†	Dem	Lauren Kuby	Dem
9th	D +5.8	Eva Burch	Dem	Eva Burch	Dem
10th	R +20.4	Dave Farnsworth	Rep	Dave Farnsworth	Rep
11th	D +51.7	Catherine Miranda	Dem	Catherine Miranda	Dem
12th	D +18.6	Mitzi Epstein	Dem	Mitzi Epstein	Dem
13th	D +2.9	J. D. Mesnard	Rep	J. D. Mesnard	Rep
14th	R +15.1	Warren Petersen	Rep	Warren Petersen	Rep
15th	R +27.2	Jake Hoffman	Rep	Jake Hoffman	Rep
16th	R +3.9	T. J. Shope	Rep	T. J. Shope	Rep
17th	R +4.3	Justine Wadsack*	Rep	Vince Leach	Rep
18th	D +24.0	Priya Sundareshan	Dem	Priya Sundareshan	Dem
19th	R +21.8	David Gowan	Rep	David Gowan	Rep
20th	D +50.6	Sally Ann Gonzales	Dem	Sally Ann Gonzales	Dem
21st	D +28.5	Rosanna Gabaldón	Dem	Rosanna Gabaldón	Dem
22nd	D +34.8	Eva Diaz	Dem	Eva Diaz	Dem
23rd	D +13.5	Brian Fernandez	Dem	Brian Fernandez	Dem
24th	D +32.0	Anna Hernandez†	Dem	Analise Ortiz	Dem
25th	R +24.1	Sine Kerr†	Rep	Tim Dunn	Rep
26th	D +38.9	Flavio Bravo (Note: Democrat Flavio Bravo was appointed to the Senate to fill the seat after Raquel Terán resigned.)	Dem	Flavio Bravo	Dem
27th	R +7.8	Anthony Kern†	Rep	Kevin Payne	Rep
28th	R +23.4	Frank Carroll	Rep	Frank Carroll	Rep
29th	R +12.4	Janae Shamp	Rep	Janae Shamp	Rep
30th	R +50.7	Sonny Borrelli†	Rep	Hildy Angius	Rep

== Detailed results ==
=== District 1 ===
Republican primary results by county: Finchem—40–49% Finchem —50–59%

Incumbent Senator Ken Bennett faced a strong primary challenge after voting multiple times against conservative bills and stymieing Republican legislation. The first challenger was Steve Zipperman, a previous primary opponent from 2022, and the second was Mark Finchem, Republican nominee for Secretary of State two years prior. Despite the strong possibility of splitting the vote, both Finchem and Zipperman stayed in the race, with Finchem ultimately prevailing by 15.07% over Bennett. This defeat represented the worst primary performance of any incumbent legislator this cycle in either chamber from either party.

Primary election results
Party	Candidate	Votes	%
Republican Party primary results
Republican	Mark Finchem	26,660	48.39%
Republican	Ken Bennett (incumbent)	18,356	33.32%
Republican	Steve Zipperman	10,081	18.30%
Total votes		55,097	100%
Democratic Party primary results
Democratic	Mike S. Fogel	17,334	100%
Total votes		17,334	100%

County results: Finchem—60–69% Fogel—50–59%

General election results
Party	Candidate	Votes	%
Republican	Mark Finchem	94,947	65.9%
Democratic	Mike S. Fogel	49,108	34.1%
Total votes		144,055	100%
Republican hold			

=== District 2 ===
District 2 election
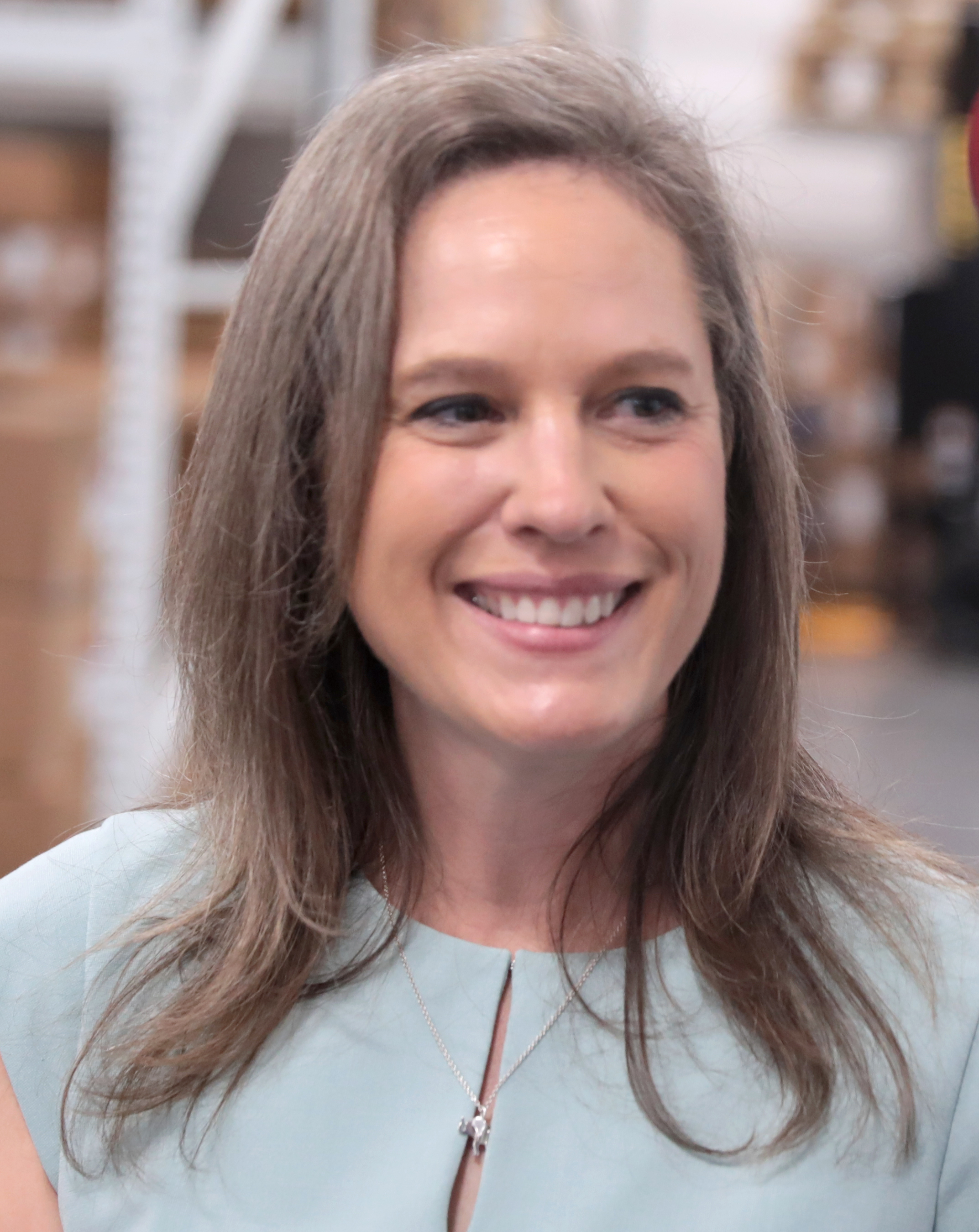

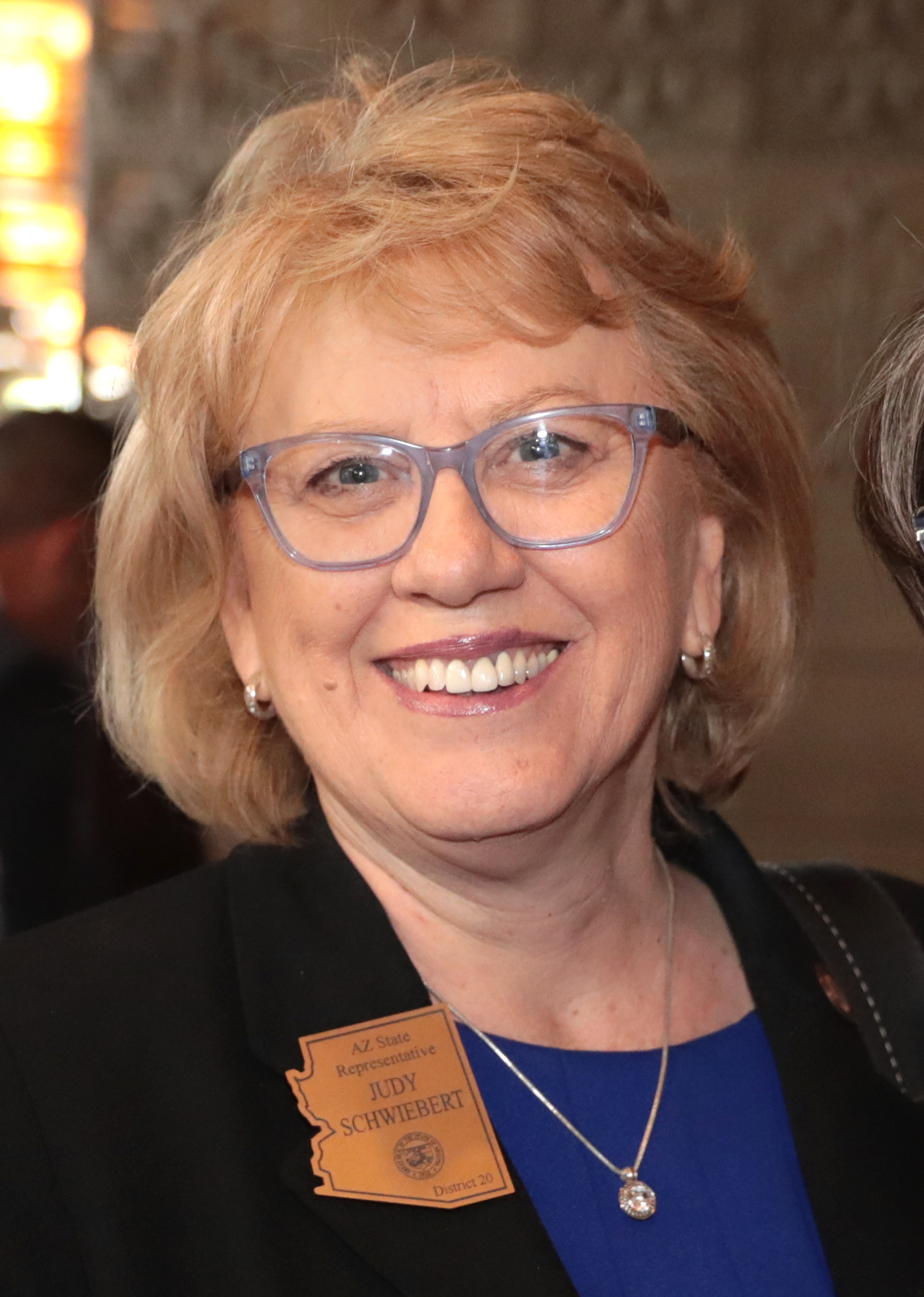
Candidate	Shawnna Bolick	Judy Schwiebert
Party	Republican	Democratic
Popular vote	52,100	48,333
Percentage	50.82%	47.15%
- Results by precinct Bolick: 40–50%; 50–60% 60–70%; Schwiebert: 40–50% 50–60%
State senator before election
Shawnna Bolick
Republican
State senator after election
Shawnna Bolick
Republican

Primary election results
Party	Candidate	Votes	%
Republican Party primary results
Republican	Shawnna Bolick (incumbent)	10,469	53.72%
Republican	Josh Barnett	9,018	46.28%
Total votes		19,487	100%
Democratic Party primary results
Democratic	Judy Schwiebert	14,351	100%
Total votes		14,351	100%
Green Party primary results
Green	Dennis Pugsley	10	100%
Total votes		10	100%

General election results
Party	Candidate	Votes	%
Republican	Shawnna Bolick (incumbent)	52,100	50.82%
Democratic	Judy Schwiebert	48,333	47.15%
Green	Dennis Pugsley	2,076	2.03%
Total votes		106,276	100%
Republican hold			

=== District 3 ===
Primary election results
Party	Candidate	Votes	%
Republican Party primary results
Republican	John Kavanagh (incumbent)	43,471	100%
Total votes		43,471	100%
Democratic Party primary results
Democratic	John Skirbst (write-in) (Note: Despite coming in first place in the Democratic primary as a write-in candidate, John Skirbst did not advance to the general election.)	219	100%
Total votes		219	100%

General election results
Party	Candidate	Votes	%
Republican	John Kavanagh (incumbent)	110,048	100%
Total votes		110,048	100%
Republican hold			

=== District 4 ===
2024 Arizona State Senate election in Legislative District 4 by Precinct Werner: 50–60%; 60–70%; Marsh: 50–60%; 60–70%; Tie

Primary election results
Party	Candidate	Votes	%
Democratic Party primary results
Democratic	Christine Marsh (incumbent)	23,558	100%
Total votes		23,558	100%
Republican Party primary results
Republican	Carine Werner	18,651	61.10%
Republican	Kenneth R. Bowers Jr.	11,874	38.90%
Total votes		30,525	100%

General election results
Party	Candidate	Votes	%
Republican	Carine Werner	76,079	51.9%
Democratic	Christine Marsh (incumbent)	70,614	48.1%
Total votes		146,693	100%
Republican gain from Democratic			

=== District 5 ===
Primary election results
Party	Candidate	Votes	%
Democratic Party primary results
Democratic	Lela Alston (incumbent)	23,236	100%
Total votes		23,236	100%
Republican Party primary results
Republican	Joshua Ortega	9,092	100%
Total votes		9,092	100%

General election results
Party	Candidate	Votes	%
Democratic	Lela Alston (incumbent)	67,425	68.3%
Republican	Joshua Ortega	31,296	31.7%
Total votes		98,721	100%
Democratic hold			

=== District 6 ===
Primary election results
Party	Candidate	Votes	%
Democratic Party primary results
Democratic	Theresa Hatathlie (incumbent)	25,254	100%
Total votes		25,254	100%

General election results
Party	Candidate	Votes	%
Democratic	Theresa Hatathlie (incumbent)	72,721	100%
Total votes		72,721	100%
Democratic hold			

=== District 7 ===
Primary election results
Party	Candidate	Votes	%
Republican primary
Republican	Wendy Rogers (incumbent)	21,978	55.33%
Republican	David Cook	17,743	44.67%
Total votes		39,721	100%
Democratic primary
Democratic	Haley Creighton	8,004	54.23%
Democratic	Roberto Apodaca Reveles	6,755	45.77%
Total votes		14,759	100%

County results: Rogers—60–69% Rogers—70–79% Creighton—50–59%

General election results
Party	Candidate	Votes	%
Republican	Wendy Rogers (incumbent)	80,750	65%
Democratic	Haley Creighton	43,406	35%
Total votes		124,156	100%
Republican hold			

=== District 8 ===
State representative Melody Hernandez was the only candidate to file for the Democratic primary, but withdrew after her nominating petitions were challenged for having an insufficient number of valid signatures. She was replaced by former Tempe City Councilmember Lauren Kuby on the ballot, who was selected by local precinct committee members in a 39–28 vote over fellow state representative Deborah Nardozzi.

Primary election results
Party	Candidate	Votes	%
Democratic Party primary results
Democratic	Lauren Kuby	14,762	99.91%
Democratic	Ivan Pemberton (write-in)	13	0.09%
Total votes		14,775	100%
Republican Party primary results
Republican	Roxana Holzapfel	9,366	100%
Total votes		9,366	100%

General election results
Party	Candidate	Votes	%
Democratic	Lauren Kuby	53,111	60.6%
Republican	Roxana Holzapfel	34,528	39.4%
Total votes		87,639	100%
Democratic hold			

=== District 9 ===
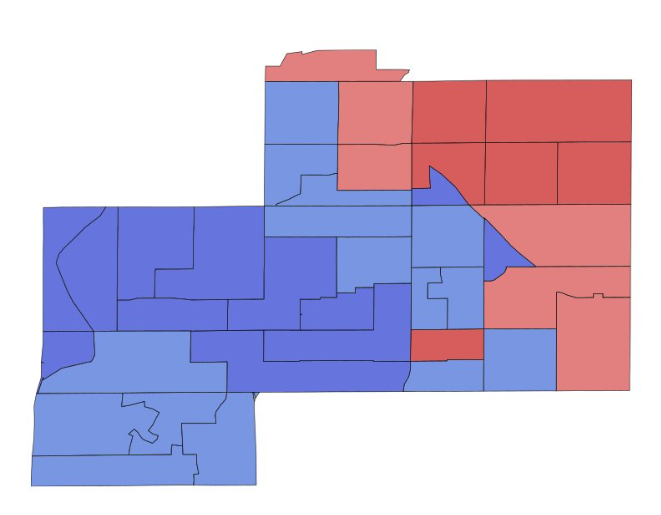
Results by precinct Burch: 50–60%; 60–70%; Scantlebury: 50–60%; 60–70%

Primary election results
Party	Candidate	Votes	%
Democratic Party primary results
Democratic	Eva Burch (incumbent)	11,033	100%
Total votes		11,033	100%
Republican Party primary results
Republican	Robert Scantlebury	9,778	64.73%
Republican	Christopher Stapley	5,327	35.27%
Total votes		15,105	100%

General election results
Party	Candidate	Votes	%
Democratic	Eva Burch (incumbent)	42,072	51.7%
Republican	Robert Scantlebury	39,261	48.3%
Total votes		81,333	100%
Democratic hold			

=== District 10 ===
Primary election results
Party	Candidate	Votes	%
Republican Party primary results
Republican	Dave Farnsworth (incumbent)	27,134	100%
Total votes		27,134	100%
Democratic Party primary results
Democratic	Robert Doyle	13,400	100%
Total votes		13,400	100%

County results: Farnsworth—60–69%

General election results
Party	Candidate	Votes	%
Republican	Dave Farnsworth (incumbent)	70,561	61.5%
Democratic	Robert Doyle	44,170	38.5%
Total votes		114,731	100%
Republican hold			

=== District 11 ===
Primary election results
Party	Candidate	Votes	%
Democratic Party primary results
Democratic	Catherine Miranda (incumbent)	14,626	100%
Total votes		14,626	100%
Republican Party primary results
Republican	Joshua Ayala	4,564	100%
Total votes		4,564	100%

General election results
Party	Candidate	Votes	%
Democratic	Catherine Miranda (incumbent)	52,106	72.2%
Republican	Joshua Ayala	20,095	27.8%
Total votes		72,201	100%
Democratic hold			

=== District 12 ===
Primary election results
Party	Candidate	Votes	%
Democratic Party primary results
Democratic	Mitzi Epstein (incumbent)	20,221	100%
Total votes		20,221	100%
Republican Party primary results
Republican	Cara Vicini	17,187	100%
Total votes		17,187	100%

General election results
Party	Candidate	Votes	%
Democratic	Mitzi Epstein (incumbent)	70,499	58.1%
Republican	Cara Vicini	50,796	41.9%
Total votes		121,295	100%
Democratic hold			

=== District 13 ===
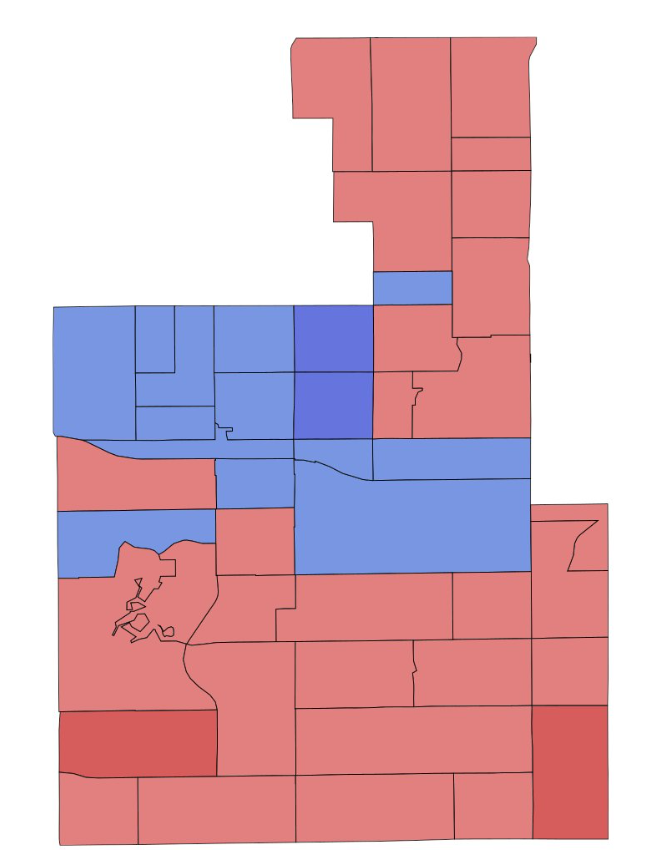
Results by precinct Mesnard: 50–60%; 60–70%; Winters: 50–60%; 60–70%

|-

Primary election results
Party	Candidate	Votes	%
Republican Party primary results
Republican	J. D. Mesnard (incumbent)	22,669	100%
Total votes		22,669	100%
Democratic Party primary results
Democratic	Sharon Lee Winters	15,619	100%
Total votes		15,619	100%

General election results
Party	Candidate	Votes	%
Republican	J. D. Mesnard (incumbent)	62,670	53.1%
Democratic	Sharon Lee Winters	55,287	46.9%
Total votes		117,957	100%
Republican hold			

=== District 14 ===
Primary election results
Party	Candidate	Votes	%
Republican Party primary results
Republican	Warren Petersen (incumbent)	26,019	100%
Total votes		26,019	100%
Democratic Party primary results
Democratic	Elizabeth Brown	12,112	100%
Total votes		12,112	100%

General election results
Party	Candidate	Votes	%
Republican	Warren Petersen (incumbent)	76,251	60.1%
Democratic	Elizabeth Brown	50,554	39.9%
Total votes		126,805	100%
Republican hold			

=== District 15 ===
Primary election results
Party	Candidate	Votes	%
Republican Party primary results
Republican	Jake Hoffman (incumbent)	30,095	100%
Total votes		30,095	100%
Democratic Party primary results
Democratic	Alan Smith	11,008	100%
Total votes		11,008	100%

County results: Hoffman—60–69%

General election results
Party	Candidate	Votes	%
Republican	Jake Hoffman (incumbent)	87,580	63.7%
Democratic	Alan Smith	43,769	31.9%
Independent	Evan Olson	6,061	4.41%
Total votes		137,410	100%
Republican hold			

=== District 16 ===
Primary election results
Party	Candidate	Votes	%
Republican Party primary results
Republican	T. J. Shope (incumbent)	19,630	99.87%
Republican	Judy Nganga (write-in)	26	0.13%
Total votes		19,656	100%
Democratic Party primary results
Democratic	Stacey Seaman	14,235	100%
Total votes		14,235	100%

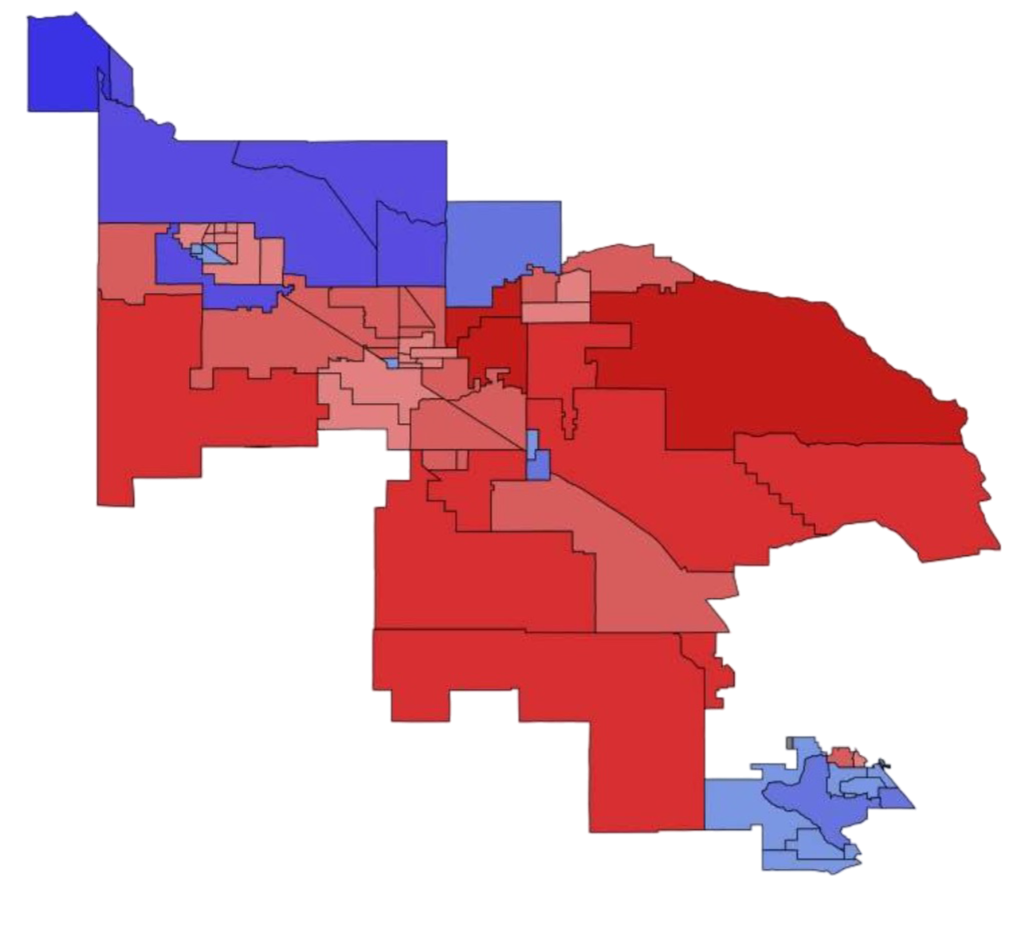

County results:

Shope—50–59%
Shope—60–69%
Shope—70–79%
Shope—80–89%
Seaman—50–59%
Seaman—60–69%
Seaman—70–79%
Seaman—80–89%

General election results
Party	Candidate	Votes	%
Republican	T. J. Shope (incumbent)	58,386	56%
Democratic	Stacey Seaman	45,888	44%
Total votes		104,274	100%
Republican hold			

=== District 17 ===
District 17 election
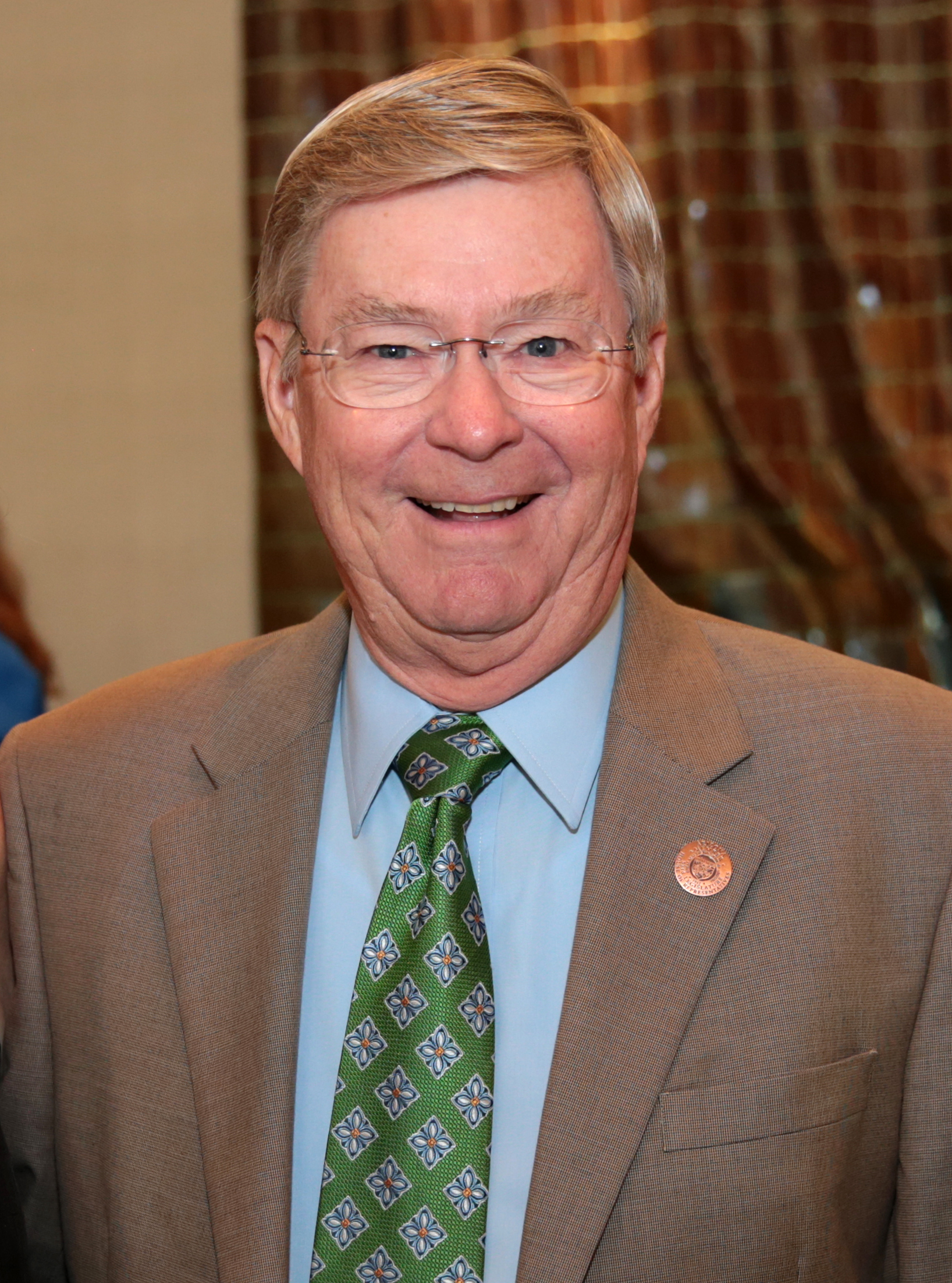

Candidate	Vince Leach	John McLean
Party	Republican	Democratic
Popular vote	77,714	74,669
Percentage	51%	49%
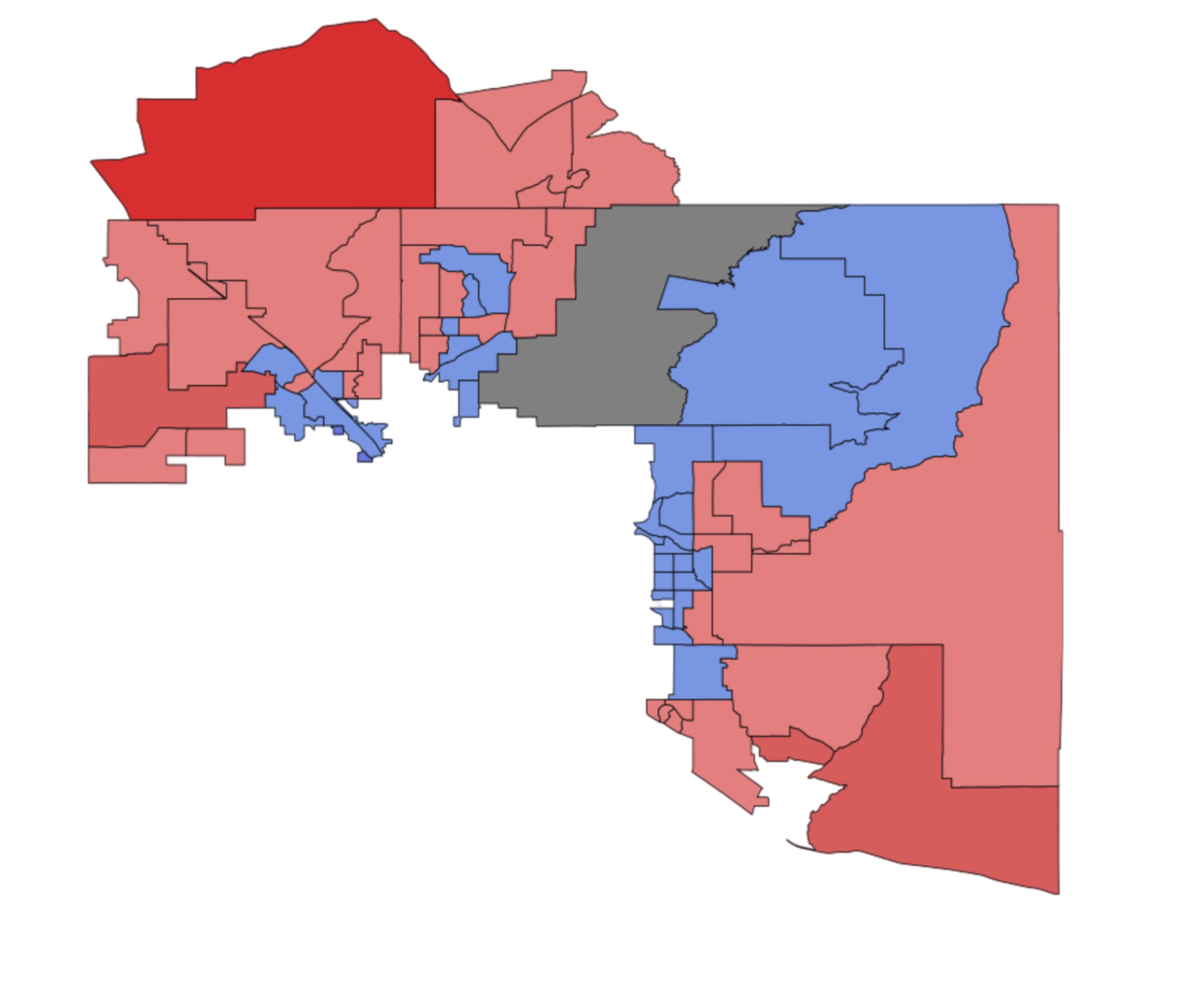
- County results: Leach 50–60% Leach 60–70% Leach 70–80% Leach 80–90% McLean 50–60% McLean 60–70%
State senator before election
Justine Wadsack
Republican
State senator after election
Vince Leach
Republican

Democratic nominee John McLean drew more than 800 donors through the donor-advisory platform Oath during the campaign.

Primary election results
Party	Candidate	Votes	%
Republican Party primary results
Republican	Vince Leach	19,363	52.66%
Republican	Justine Wadsack (incumbent)	17,409	47.34%
Total votes		36,772	100%
Democratic Party primary results
Democratic	John McLean	26,428	100%
Total votes		26,428	100%

General election results
Party	Candidate	Votes	%
Republican	Vince Leach	77,714	51%
Democratic	John McLean	74,669	49%
Total votes		152,383	100%
Republican hold			

=== District 18 ===
Primary election results
Party	Candidate	Votes	%
Democratic Party primary results
Democratic	Priya Sundareshan (incumbent)	29,643	100%
Total votes		29,643	100%

General election results
Party	Candidate	Votes	%
Democratic	Priya Sundareshan (incumbent)	89,003	100%
Total votes		89,003	100%
Democratic hold			

=== District 19 ===
Primary election results
Party	Candidate	Votes	%
Republican Party primary results
Republican	David Gowan (incumbent)	30,350	100%
Total votes		30,350	100%
Democratic Party primary results
Democratic	Bob Karp	16,873	100%
Total votes		16,873	100%

County results: Gowan—50–59% Gowan—60–69% Gowan—70–79%

General election results
Party	Candidate	Votes	%
Republican	David Gowan (incumbent)	71,192	62.6%
Democratic	Bob Karp	42,555	37.4%
Total votes		113,747	100%
Republican hold			

=== District 20 ===
Primary election results
Party	Candidate	Votes	%
Democratic Party primary results
Democratic	Sally Ann Gonzales (incumbent)	20,253	100%
Total votes		20,253	100%

General election results
Party	Candidate	Votes	%
Democratic	Sally Ann Gonzales (incumbent)	65,214	100%
Total votes		65,214	100%
Democratic hold			

=== District 21 ===
Primary election results
Party	Candidate	Votes	%
Democratic Party primary results
Democratic	Rosanna Gabaldón (incumbent)	18,562	100%
Total votes		18,562	100%

General election results
Party	Candidate	Votes	%
Democratic	Rosanna Gabaldón (incumbent)	64,282	100%
Total votes		64,282	100%
Democratic hold			

=== District 22 ===
Primary election results
Party	Candidate	Votes	%
Democratic Party primary results
Democratic	Eva Diaz (incumbent)	7,826	76.19%
Democratic	Leezah Sun	2,446	23.81%
Total votes		10,272	100%
Republican Party primary results
Republican	Steve Robinson	5,243	100%
Total votes		5,243	100%

General election results
Party	Candidate	Votes	%
Democratic	Eva Diaz (incumbent)	45,253	64.6%
Republican	Steve Robinson	24,812	35.4%
Total votes		70,065	100%
Democratic hold			

=== District 23 ===
Primary election results
Party	Candidate	Votes	%
Democratic Party primary results
Democratic	Brian Fernandez (incumbent)	6,943	60.35%
Democratic	Jesus Arnulfo Lugo Jr.	4,562	39.65%
Total votes		11,505	100%
Republican Party primary results
Republican	Michelle Altherr	9,657	100%
Total votes		9,657	100%

County results: Fernandez—50–59% Fernandez—60–69% Fernandez—90–100% Altherr—50–59%

General election results
Party	Candidate	Votes	%
Democratic	Brian Fernandez (incumbent)	42,658	53.8%
Republican	Michelle Altherr	36,602	46.2%
Total votes		79,260	100%
Democratic hold			

=== District 24 ===
Primary election results
Party	Candidate	Votes	%
Democratic Party primary results
Democratic	Analise Ortiz	8,539	86.67%
Democratic	Mario Garcia	1,313	13.33%
Total votes		9,852	100%

General election results
Party	Candidate	Votes	%
Democratic	Analise Ortiz	38,436	100%
Total votes		38,436	100%
Democratic hold			

=== District 25 ===
Primary election results
Party	Candidate	Votes	%
Republican Party primary results
Republican	Tim Dunn	25,578	100%
Total votes		25,578	100%

General election results
Party	Candidate	Votes	%
Republican	Tim Dunn	88,531	100%
Total votes		88,531	100%
Republican hold			

=== District 26 ===
Primary election results
Party	Candidate	Votes	%
Democratic Party primary results
Democratic	Flavio Bravo (incumbent)	8,526	100%
Total votes		8,526	100%
Republican Party primary results
Republican	Victor "Vic" Harris	4,285	100%
Total votes		4,285	100%

General election results
Party	Candidate	Votes	%
Democratic	Flavio Bravo (incumbent)	31,198	66.3%
Republican	Victor "Vic" Harris	15,826	33.7%
Total votes		47,024	100%
Democratic hold			

=== District 27 ===
Primary election results
Party	Candidate	Votes	%
Republican Party primary results
Republican	Kevin Payne	20,673	100%
Total votes		20,673	100%

General election results
Party	Candidate	Votes	%
Republican	Kevin Payne	67,274	100%
Total votes		67,274	100%
Republican hold			

=== District 28 ===
Primary election results
Party	Candidate	Votes	%
Republican Party primary results
Republican	Frank Carroll (incumbent)	40,105	100%
Total votes		40,105	100%

General election results
Party	Candidate	Votes	%
Republican	Frank Carroll (incumbent)	97,174	98.9%
Democratic	Shauna Dempsey (write-in)	1,112	1.1%
Total votes		98,286	100%
Republican hold			

=== District 29 ===
Primary election results
Party	Candidate	Votes	%
Republican Party primary results
Republican	Janae Shamp (incumbent)	25,306	100%
Total votes		25,306	100%
Democratic Party primary results
Democratic	Eric Stafford	13,498	100%
Total votes		13,498	100%

General election results
Party	Candidate	Votes	%
Republican	Janae Shamp (incumbent)	70,924	59.3%
Democratic	Eric Stafford	48,608	40.7%
Total votes		119,532	100%
Republican hold			

=== District 30 ===
Primary election results
Party	Candidate	Votes	%
Republican Party primary results
Republican	Hildy Angius	19,874	51.63%
Republican	Ashley Gerich	10,663	27.70%
Republican	Kimberly Zanon	7,956	20.67%
Total votes		38,493	100%
Democratic Party primary results
Democratic	J'aime MorgAine	7,926	100%
Total votes		7,926	100%

County results: Angius—70–79%

General election results
Party	Candidate	Votes	%
Republican	Hildy Angius	92,213	78.5%
Democratic	J'aime MorgAine	25,295	21.5%
Total votes		117,508	100%
Republican hold			
