= Elaine Aldrete =

American politician

Member-elect of the Arizona Senate from the 16th district
- Assuming office January 2027
- Succeeding: T. J. Shope

Personal details
- Born: Claremont, New Hampshire
- Party: Democratic

Elaine Clark Aldrete is an American author and politician. A member of the Democratic Party, she is the member-elect for the 16th district of the Arizona Senate.

Aldrete was born in Claremont, New Hampshire, and previously resided in Santa Paula, California. She previously served as a board director for the nonprofits Diabetes Explorer Educational Foundation, Inc. and Grants to You. Aldrete founded nonprofit Teaching Life Choices, Inc., in 2012 and wrote two children's novels about diabetes.
