= Lisbeth Arescurenaga =

American politician

Member of the Arizona House of Representatives from the 24th district
- Incumbent
- Assumed office January 2027 Serving with Alberto Flores
- Preceded by: Anna Abeytia

Personal details
- Born: Peru
- Party: Democratic
- Education: Arizona State University (BA); Ottawa University (MA)

Lisbeth Arescurenaga is a Peruvian-born American politician. A member of the Democratic Party, she is the member-elect for the 24th district of the Arizona House of Representatives.

== Early life, education, and early career ==
Arescurenaga was born in Peru and immigrated to the United States alone at fifteen years old. Prior to running for office, Arescurenaga worked as a Program Coordinator at Cancer Support Community and as a social worker.

== Career ==
In 2026, Arescurenaga ran alongside Alberto Flores in the Democratic primary for the 24th district of the Arizona House of Representatives as part of the "No Safe Seats" campaign led by State Senator Analise Ortiz. The pair challenged Lydia Hernandez, who had been formally censured by the Democratic Party of Legislative District 24 in June 2026 for voting with Republicans more than 170 times. In the primary, Arescurenaga and Flores were endorsed by the Arizona Working Families Party and Congresswoman Adelita Grijalva. In the July 21st primary, Arescurenaga and Flores successfully defeated Hernandez and her running-mate, Rosa Cantu. Arescurenage and Flores were additionally endorsed by the Phoenix chapter of the Democratic Socialists of America ahead of the general election.

== Personal Life ==
Arescurenaga identifies as queer.
