= Alberto Flores (politician) =

American politician

Member-elect of the Arizona House of Representatives from the 24th district
- Assuming office January 2027
- Succeeding: Lydia Hernandez

Personal details
- Party: Democratic

Alberto Flores is an American politician. A member of the Democratic Party, he is the member-elect for the 24th district of the Arizona House of Representatives.

== Career ==
In 2026, Flores ran alongside Lisbeth Arescurenaga in the Democratic primary for the 24th district of the Arizona House of Representatives as part of the "No Safe Seats" campaign led by State Senator Analise Ortiz. The pair challenged Lydia Hernandez, who had been formally censured by the Democratic Party of Legislative District 24 in June 2026 for voting with Republicans more than 170 times. In the primary, Arescurenaga and Flores were endorsed by the Arizona Working Families Party and Congresswoman Adelita Grijalva. In the July 21st primary, Arescurenaga and Flores successfully defeated Hernandez and her running-mate, Rosa Cantu. Arescurenage and Flores were additionally endorsed by the Phoenix chapter of the Democratic Socialists of America ahead of the general election.
