= Keith Seaman (Arizona politician) =

American politician

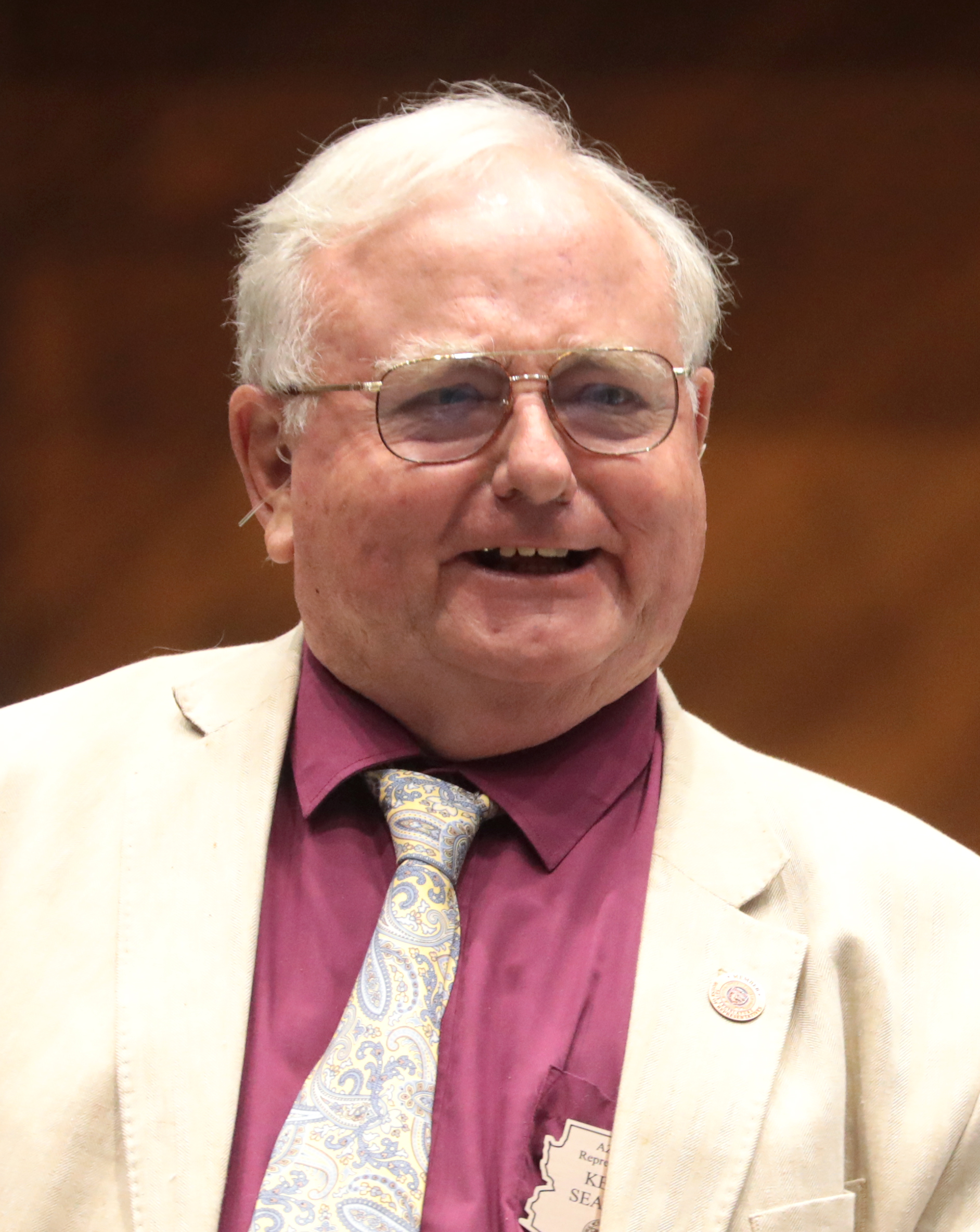
- Seaman in 2023

Member of the Arizona House of Representatives from the 16th district
- In office January 9, 2023 – January 13, 2025 Serving with Teresa Martinez
- Preceded by: John Fillmore
- Succeeded by: Chris Lopez

Personal details
- Born: Casa Grande, Arizona, U.S.
- Party: Democratic

Keith Seaman is an American politician and a retired public-school teacher. He is a Democratic former member of the Arizona House of Representatives elected to represent District 16 in 2022. He defeated Republican candidate Rob Hudelson by a margin of 644 votes, or 0.62%. He worked in education for four decades including as a teacher, principal, and the superintendent of Mohave County, Arizona.
