= Christine Marsh =

American politician

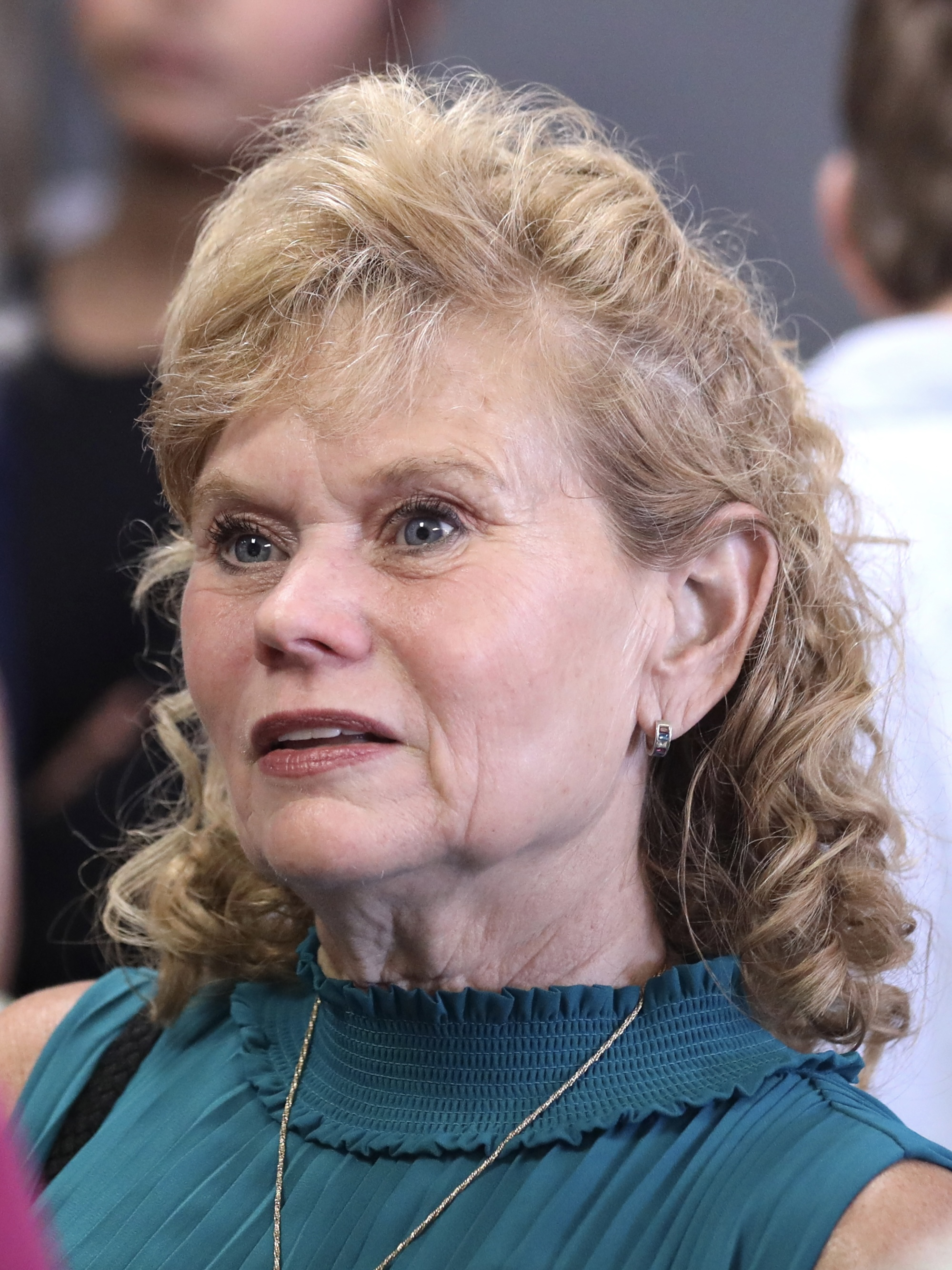
- Marsh in 2024

Member of the Arizona Senate
- In office January 11, 2021 – January 13, 2025
- Preceded by: Kate Brophy McGee
- Succeeded by: Carine Werner
- Constituency: 28th district (2021-2023); 4th district (2023-2025)

Personal details
- Party: Democratic

Christine Porter Marsh is an American politician and public school teacher from Arizona. She was elected to the state senate in 2020, and served until 2025. A Democrat, she was first elected to represent district District 28, and later District 4, after redistricting. She won by 497 votes (50.2%) against incumbent Kate Brophy McGee in an election with more than 120,000 votes cast. Marsh previously ran against Brophy McGee in 2018 and lost by 267 votes (49.9%).

Christine Marsh taught high school English at Chaparral High School for 27 years, before leaving to teach in the Cave Creek Unified School district for two years. In 2019 and she returned to Scottsdale Unified School District and in 2021 started her 30th year of teaching. In 2016, Marsh was named Arizona's Teacher of the Year.

Marsh received undergraduate degree in English literature from the University of California Los Angeles after attending on a track scholarship. She received her Master's from the College of Education at Grand Canyon University. Marsh also has an honorary Doctorate of Humane Letters from Northern Arizona University.
