= Hildy Angius =

American politician

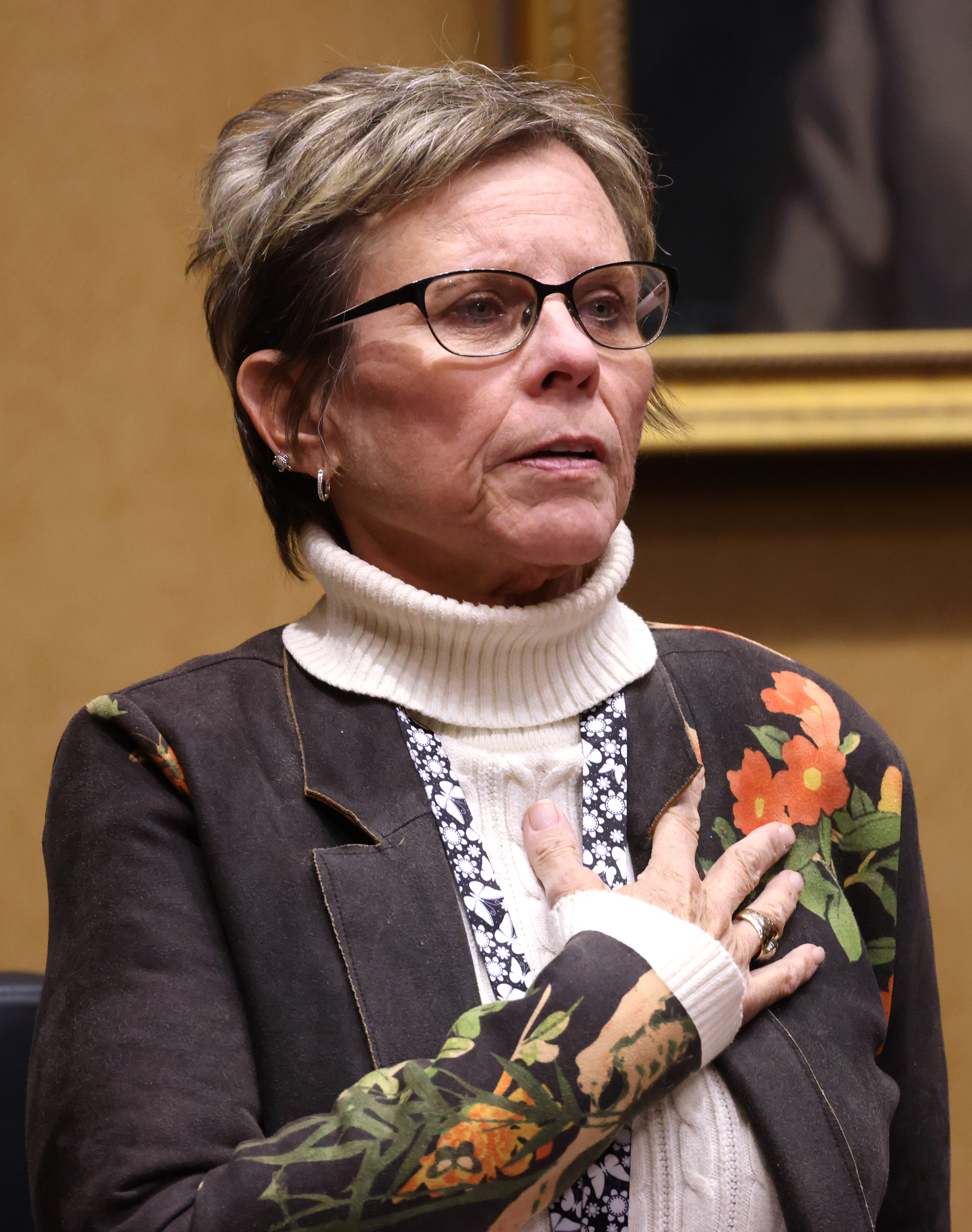
- Angius in 2025

Member of the Arizona Senate from the 30th district
- Incumbent
- Assumed office January 13, 2025
- Preceded by: Sonny Borrelli

Personal details
- Born: New York, U.S.
- Party: Republican
- Education: State University of New York at Albany

Hildy Angius is an American politician who is a member of the Arizona Senate from the 30th district. A Republican, she has served on the Mohave County Board of Supervisors since 2012. She originally filed a statement of interest to run for the Arizona House of Representatives in 2026, but ultimately announced she would retire from the legislature altogether.

== Early life and career ==
Angius is a native of New York and graduated from the State University of New York at Albany with a degree in English and theater in 1983.

She had a career in marketing before entering politics when she was elected to the Mohave County Board of Supervisors in 2012. Angius voted for a defeated resolution which would have the county hand count votes in the 2024 United States elections. She supported the establishment of a womans drug rehab house in Bullhead City, which was then named "Hildy's House" by its director in her honor.

== Arizona Senate ==
=== Election ===
Angius was elected to the Arizona Senate from the 30th district in 2024.

In November 2025, she announced she would not seek election to either chamber of the Arizona State Legislature.

=== Tenure ===
In May 2025, Angius introduced a bill mandating that individuals who are involuntarily committed to a mental health facility be placed in separate facilities depending on whether they are placed through the civil or criminal proceedings. The Arizona Capitol Times reported that Angius was the only member of the senate with a perfect attendance record in June 2025.

== Personal life ==
Angius has lived in Bullhead City since 2005, having previously lived in San Diego, California.
