= Lydia Hernandez =

American politician

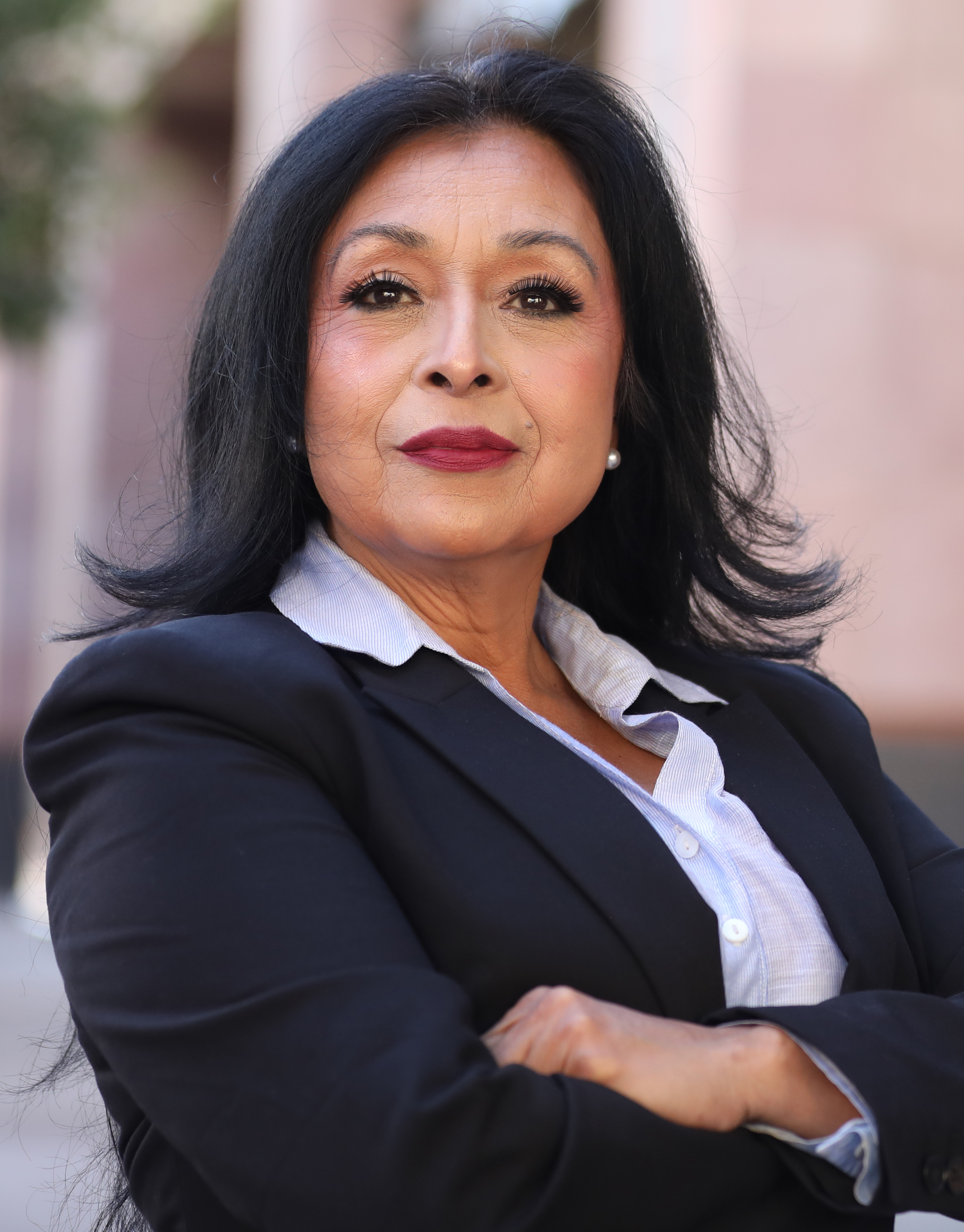

Member of the Arizona House of Representatives from the 24th district
- Incumbent
- Assumed office January 9, 2023 Serving with Anna Abeytia
- Preceded by: Jennifer Longdon (redistricting)
- Succeeded by: Alberto Flores (elect)
- In office January 14, 2013 – January 5, 2015 Serving with Martín Quezada
- Preceded by: Matt Heinz
- Succeeded by: Ceci Velasquez
- Constituency: 29th district

Personal details
- Born: Texas, U.S.
- Party: Democratic
- Education: Baylor University (BA)
- Website: Legislative website Campaign website

Lydia Hernandez is an American politician serving as a member of the Arizona House of Representatives for the 24th district since January 2023. A Democrat, she previously served in the House from 2013 through 2015 representing the 29th district.

== Career ==
Hernandez has served as an elected member of the Cartwright Elementary School District Board since 2004. She currently serves as the Governing Board President In this role, she attended a Mexican American School Boards Association meeting in Texas in 2019 and reportedly caused a scene while intoxicated. She was banned from the organization's events for two years and her position as chair-elect of the National Hispanic Council of the National School Boards Association was revoked due to the incident.

Hernandez's daughter, Cassandra Hernandez, won a seat on the Cartwright Elementary School District Board at just 19 years old in November 2024. However, her daughter's ability to serve was complicated by Arizona state law prohibiting individuals from running or serving as school board members with an immediate family member with whom they resided in the previous four years. Critics say this makes the board essentially illegitimate. The criticism led her ally in the House, Consuelo Hernandez, to sponsor an amendment to a bill she sponsored that would have allowed Cassandra to legally serve with her mother. That bill did not pass, but with her daughter and another ally on the five-member board, Hernandez controls the majority vote and made an immediate staff shake-up by placing the interim superintendent on paid leave and hiring former Maricopa County School Superintendent Steve Watson. The hire drew immediate backlash from the local community as Watson had lost his last primary reelection campaign after allegations of financial mismanagement.

=== Arizona House of Representatives ===
Hernandez has served in the Arizona House of Representatives twice, first from 2013 to 2015 and currently since 2023.

==== Tenure ====
She endorsed Republican Doug Ducey in the 2018 Arizona gubernatorial election.

Hernandez voted with Republicans to ban photo radar and red light cameras from ticketing drivers.

In February 2024, Hernandez filed an ethics complaint alleging other Arizona Democrats bullied her. The complaint was ultimately dismissed for being identical to a previously dismissed workplace harassment complaint made by her.

Hernandez was formally censured by the Democratic Party of Legislative District 24 in June 2026 for voting with Republicans more than 170 times and for provoking a security disruption at Maryvale High School when she entered the premises with an unidentified woman who brought a box cutter. In the 2026 Arizona Attorney General election, Hernandez endorsed Republican Warren Petersen and appeared in a Spanish language ad for his campaign after losing re-nomination.

=== Campaigns ===
==== 2014 State Senate campaign ====
In 2014, Hernandez ran for Arizona State Senate after incumbent senator Steve Gallardo retired to run for the Maricopa County Board of Supervisors. She was narrowly defeated by fellow representative Martín Quezada in the Democratic primary.

==== 2016 State Senate campaign ====
She ran for the seat again in 2016, challenging Quezada in the Democratic primary. The race was notably uncivil and negative between the two candidates, with both candidates and their respective supporters attacking each other on social media. Quezada ultimately defeated Hernandez again.

==== 2019 Phoenix City Council campaign ====
In 2019, Hernandez ran for Phoenix City Council. She was defeated in the primary election.

==== 2026 State House campaign ====
In 2026, Hernandez lost re-nomination to challengers Lisbeth Arescurenaga and Alberto Flores. She placed third in the Democratic primary election behind the two, who ran on a slate including incumbent state senator Analise Ortiz.
