= Analise Ortiz =

American politician

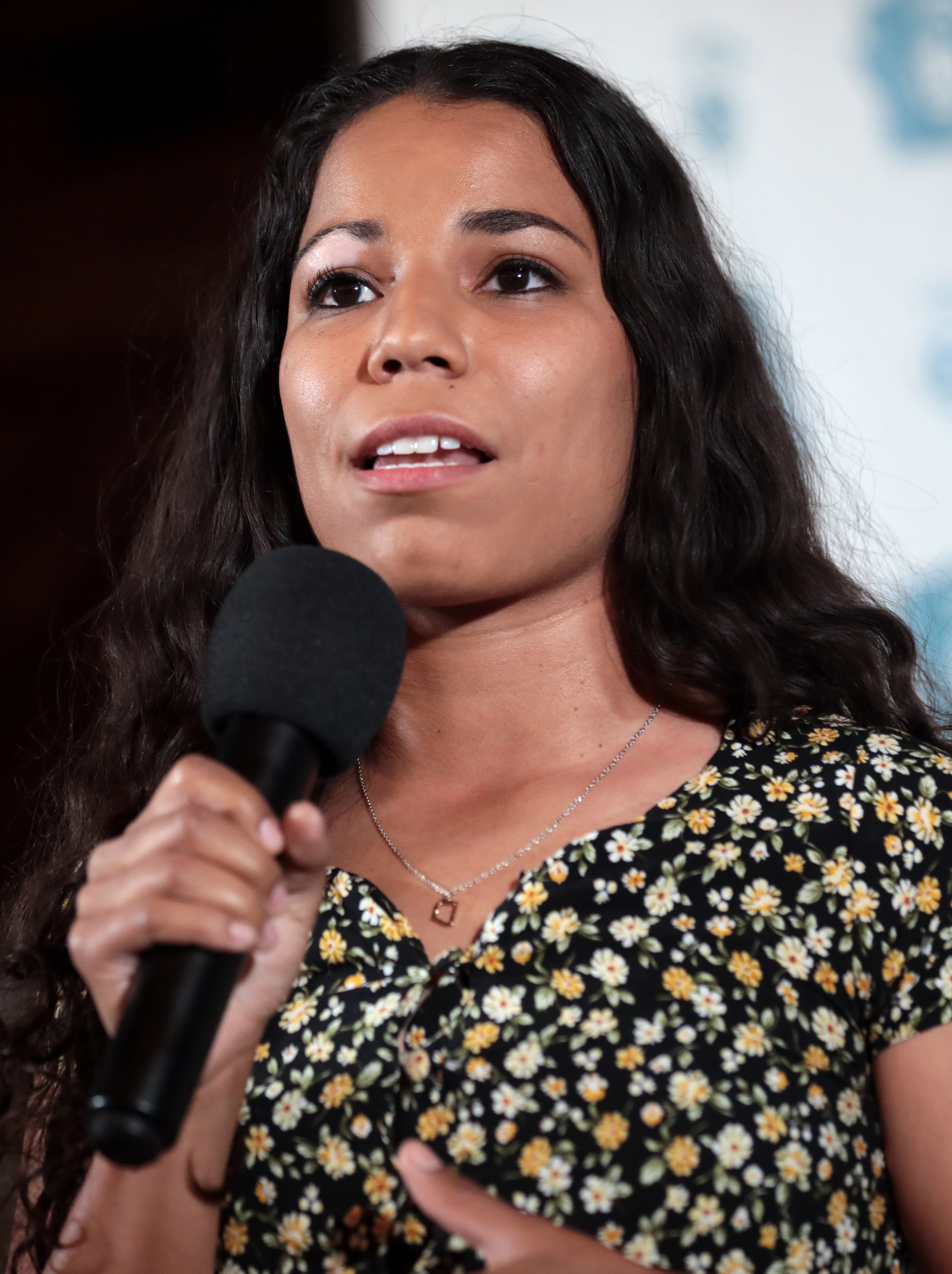
- Ortiz in 2022

Member of the Arizona Senate from the 24th district
- Incumbent
- Assumed office January 13, 2025
- Preceded by: Anna Hernandez

Member of the Arizona House of Representatives from the 24th district
- In office January 9, 2023 – January 13, 2025 Serving with Lydia Hernandez
- Preceded by: Amish Shah (redistricting)
- Succeeded by: Anna Abeytia

Personal details
- Born: c. 1993 Scottsdale, Arizona, U.S.
- Party: Democratic
- Education: Arizona State University (BA)

Analise Ortiz is an American politician, activist, and journalist who is a member of the Arizona Senate representing the 24th district. Prior to that she was a member of the Arizona House of Representatives.

== Early life and education ==
Ortiz was born in Scottsdale, Arizona circa 1993 and raised in a Catholic household. She earned a Bachelor of Arts degree in journalism and mass communication from the Walter Cronkite School of Journalism at Arizona State University in 2014.

== Career ==
Ortiz began her career as a breaking news reporter for The Arizona Republic. From 2015 to 2017, she worked as a multimedia journalist for KGBT-TV in Harlingen, Texas. She then worked for KTNV-TV in Las Vegas. From 2018 to 2021, Ortiz worked for the ACLU of Arizona as a campaign strategist. Ortiz was elected to the Arizona House of Representatives in November 2022. In the House, she served as the ranking Democrat on the Judiciary Committee. She was elected to the 24th district of the Arizona Senate in November 2024.

In 2026, Ortiz launched the "No Safe Seats" campaign to back progressive primary challenges against incumbent Democratic legislators. Three of the four challenges won their primaries: Alberto Flores, Lisbeth Arescurenaga, and Miranda Lopez.

Following the November 2026 general election, in which Democrats won a majority in the Arizona Senate, Ortiz was chosen to serve as the Senate Majority Whip.

== Personal life ==
Ortiz identifies as pansexual.
