= Anna Abeytia =

American politician

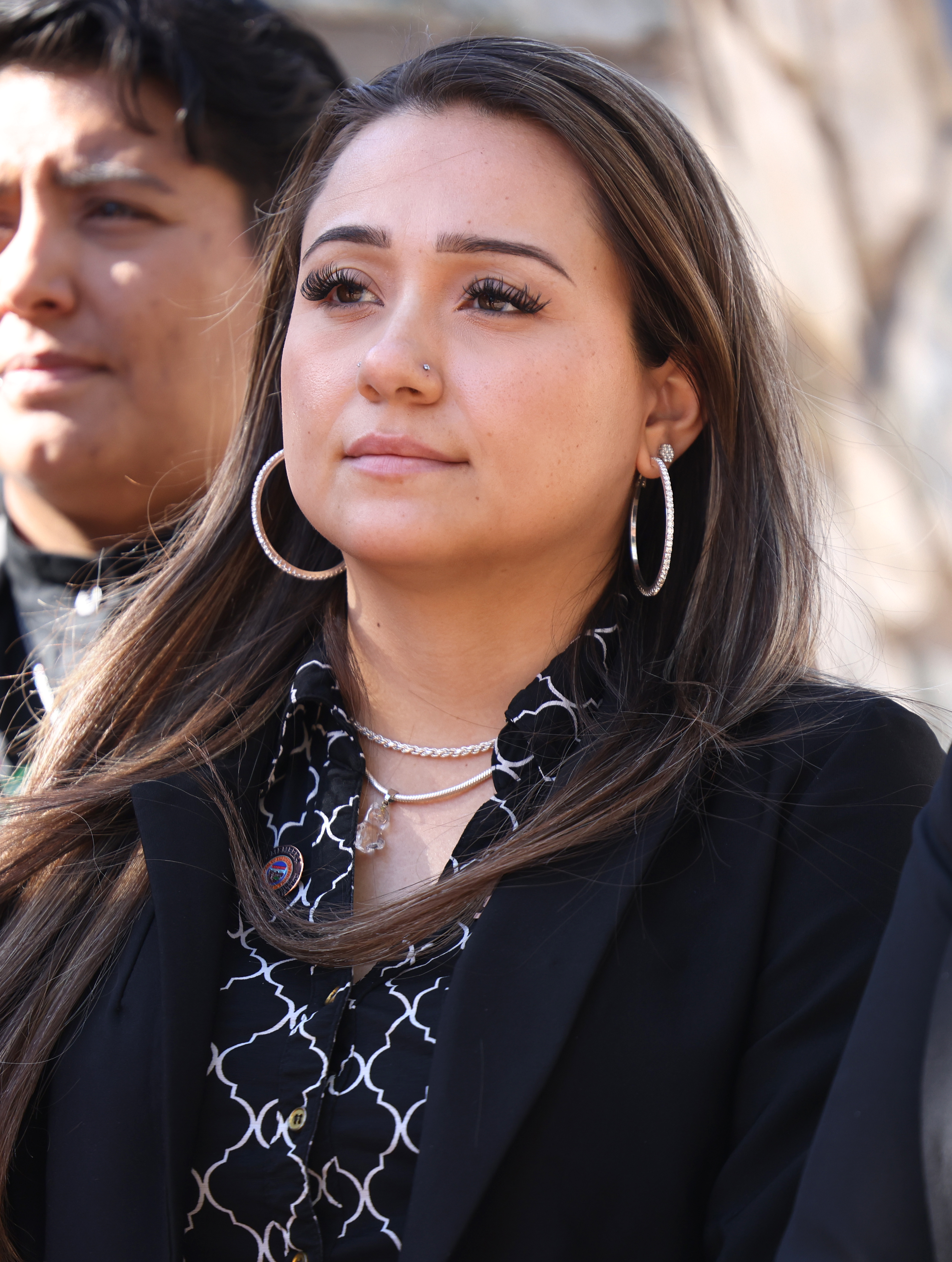
- Abeytia in 2025

Member of the Arizona House of Representatives from the 24th district
- Incumbent
- Assumed office January 13, 2025 Serving with Lydia Hernandez
- Preceded by: Analise Ortiz
- Succeeded by: Lisbeth Arescurenaga (elect)

Personal details
- Born: Maryvale, Arizona
- Party: Democratic

Anna Lynn Abeytia is an American politician. She serves as a Democratic member for the 24th district of the Arizona House of Representatives. She currently serves alongside Lydia Hernandez and also served on the Cartwright School District alongside her for 4 years before losing her seat in 2024.

Abeytia was born and raised in Maryvale, Arizona.
