= Anna Hernandez =

American politician

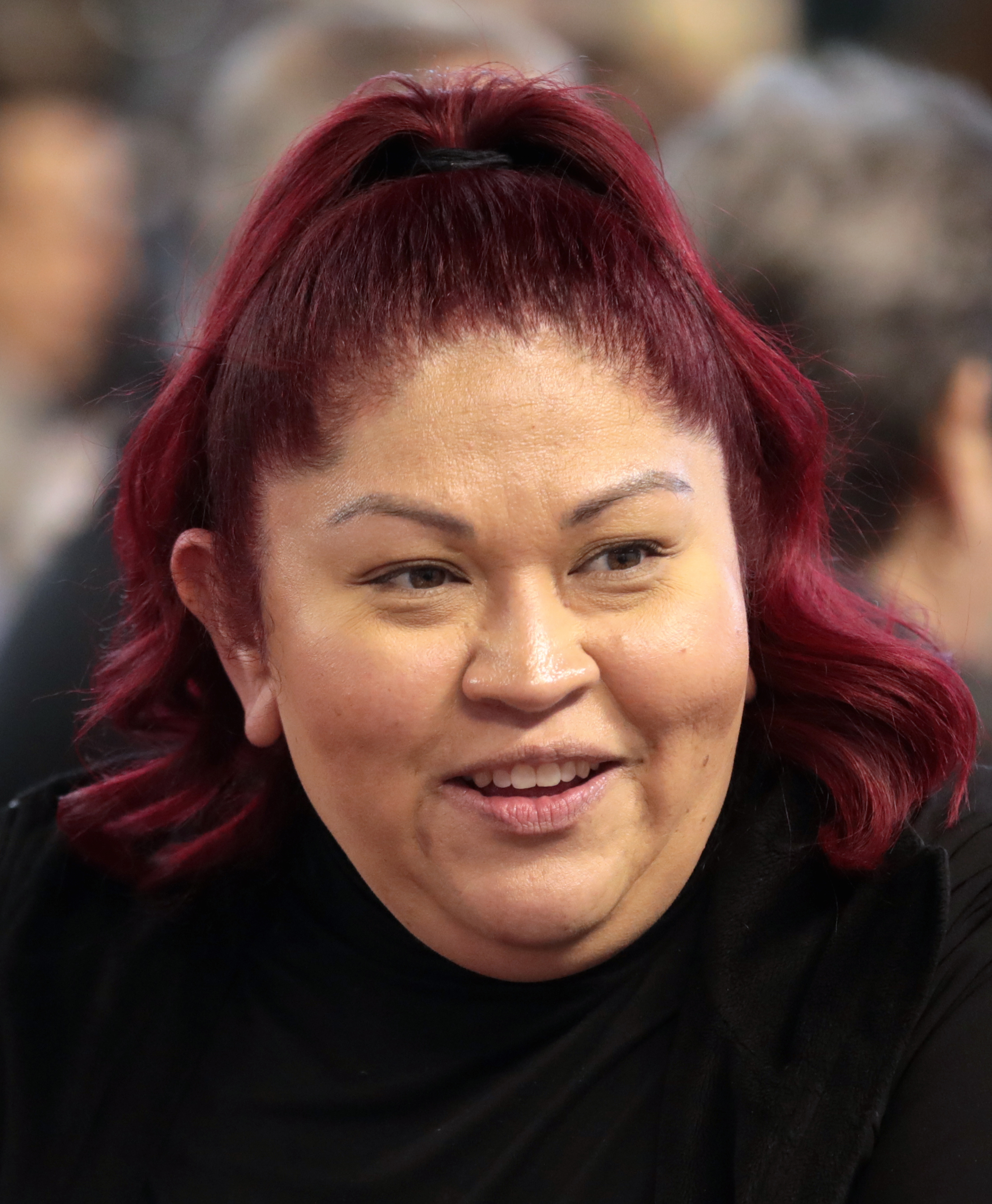
- Hernandez in 2023

Member of Phoenix City Council from the 7th district
- Incumbent
- Assumed office April 21, 2025
- Preceded by: Carlos Galindo-Elvira

Member of the Arizona Senate from the 24th district
- In office January 9, 2023 – January 13, 2025
- Preceded by: Lela Alston (redistricting)
- Succeeded by: Analise Ortiz

Personal details
- Party: Democratic

Anna Hernandez is an American politician who serves as a member of the Phoenix City Council. Hernandez was elected in 2022 to serve in the Arizona State Senate representing District 24 as a member of the Democratic Party, defeating incumbent State Representative Cesar Chavez in the Democratic primary. Hernandez went on to be unopposed in the general election.

During her tenure in the Arizona Senate, she has been described as a "staunch housing advocate" and spearheaded legislative efforts to increase housing supply through faster permitting processes and less restrictive zoning regulations.

In 2024, she won a four-way race for Phoenix City Council's district 7 seat with 52.7% of the vote. The district covers Maryvale, Estrella, Laveen, downtown and south Phoenix.

Hernandez's brother was killed by the Phoenix Police Department in 2019 during a mental health crisis. Her father died of COVID-19 in 2021.
