= Chris Lopez =

American politician

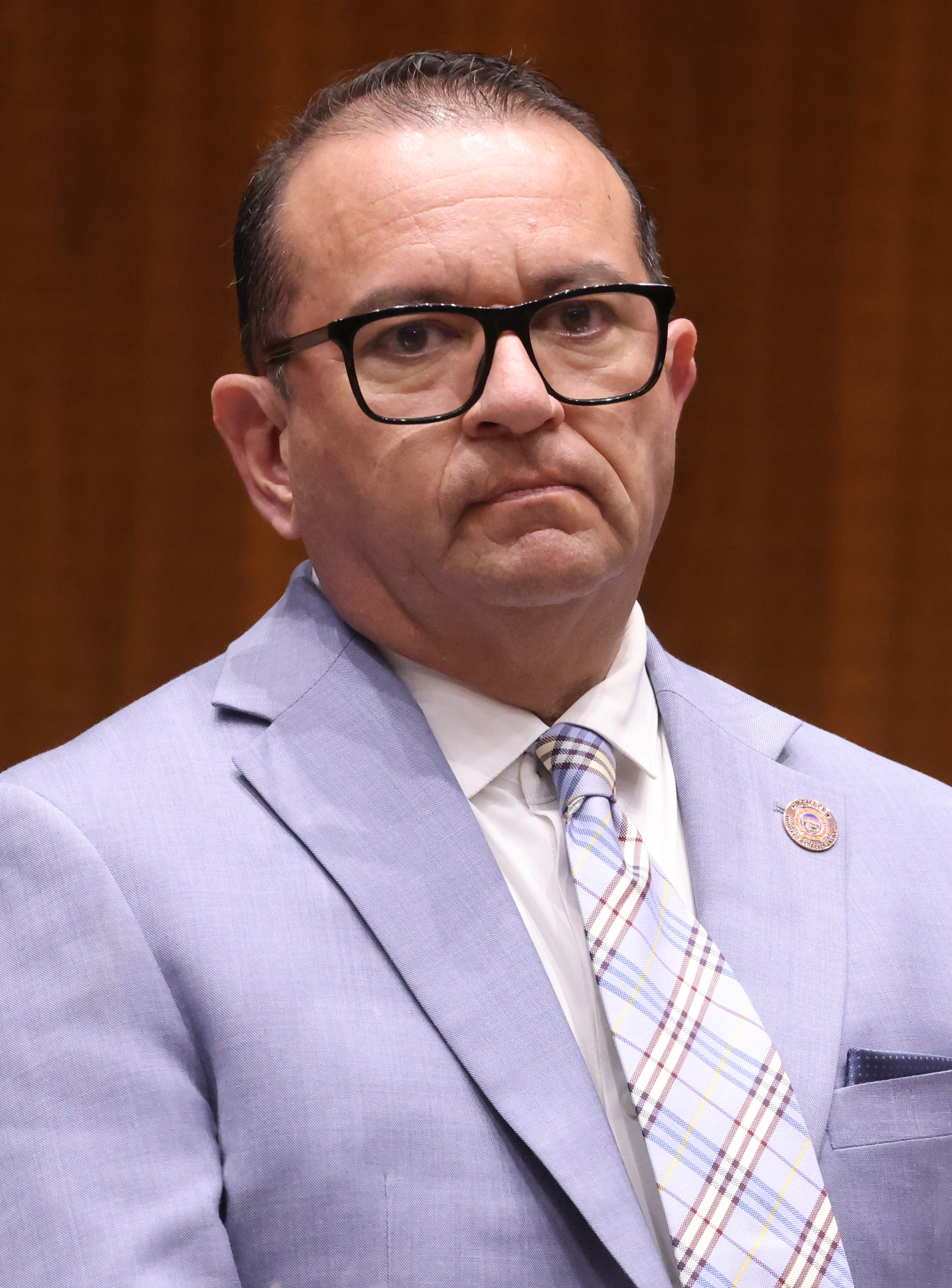
- Lopez in 2025

Member of the Arizona House of Representatives from the 16th district
- Incumbent
- Assumed office January 13, 2025 Serving with Teresa Martinez
- Preceded by: Keith Seaman

Personal details
- Party: Republican

Chris Lopez is an American politician serving as a member of the Arizona House of Representatives for the 16th district since 2025. A Republican, he was elected in 2024 after defeating incumbent Democrat Keith Seaman.
