= Carine Werner =

American politician

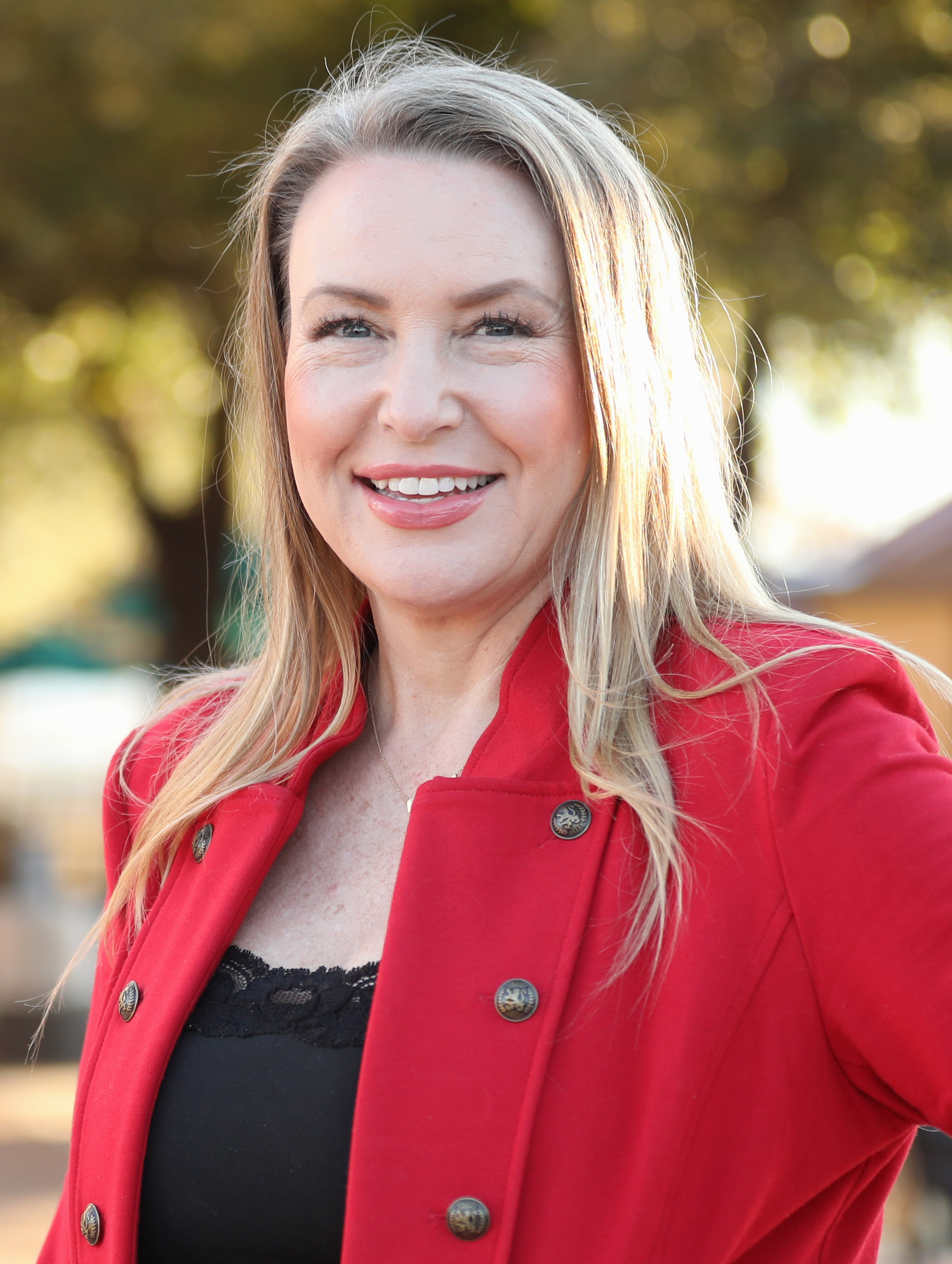
- Werner in 2024

Member of the Arizona Senate from the 4th district
- Incumbent
- Assumed office January 13, 2025
- Preceded by: Christine Marsh

Personal details
- Party: Republican

Carine Werner is an American politician who is a member of the Arizona Senate from the 4th district. A Republican, she has served on the Scottsdale Unified School District School Board. Werner defeated incumbent Democratic State Senator Christine Marsh in the 2024 general election. Since her election to the State Senate, she serves as Chair of the Senate Health and Human Services Committee and vice-chair of the Education Committee.

Carine Werner and her family immigrated to the United States without knowing English. Carine is married. They have three children.
