= Oath (organization) =

American political fundraising and donor-advisory platform

- Industry: Political technology
- Founded: 2022; 4 years ago
- Founders: Brian Derrick; Taylor Ourada
- Area served: United States
- Key people: Brian Derrick (CEO)
- Website: oath.vote

Oath is an American political fundraising and donor-advisory platform focused primarily on Democratic political giving. The platform uses electoral and fundraising data to recommend candidates and races where individual donations may have a greater potential impact.

== History ==
Oath was co-founded by Brian Derrick and Taylor Ourada, both of whom had previously worked in Democratic political campaigning and fundraising.

The concept developed following the 2020 United States elections. Derrick and Ourada analyzed fundraising patterns in several high-profile Democratic campaigns and concluded that substantial amounts of grassroots funding had been directed toward candidates in races where additional contributions were unlikely to alter the outcome.

The platform soft-launched in 2022. During the 2022 cycle it directed roughly $2 million from more than 10,000 donors to candidates, according to figures reported by TIME, after which the founders left their other jobs to work on the company full time. Ahead of the 2024 elections, Oath expanded the range of contests it rated to include congressional, statewide, state legislative and selected local races, and set a target of moving $30 million to candidates during that cycle. In August 2024, state Senate candidate John McLean had gained more than 800 donors through Oath and that contributions routed through the platform accounted for as much as 40 percent of some Arizona candidates' funding.

In October 2024, Bloomberg grouped Oath with organizations such as the States Project as examples of a "Moneyball"-style approach to Democratic giving, in which money is steered toward closely contested state and local races. In April 2025, Oath had processed approximately $35 million for Democratic candidates during the 2024 cycle, a figure far below the roughly $4 billion processed by ActBlue in the same year.

In March 2026, Oath had expanded its staff and analytical operations. The company was tracking thousands of electoral races and was targeting $200 million in donation volume for the 2026 election cycle.

== Platform ==
Oath presents donors with recommended candidates and races, filtered by the donor's stated policy priorities and geographic interests.

The service uses an internally developed "Impact Score" to rank candidates based on three factors: the competitiveness of the race, its potential political impact, and the candidate's financial need. The model uses factors including district partisanship, election forecasts, fundraising, outside spending and local advertising costs. Candidates cannot pay to be listed or increase their score, and the company does not charge candidates or donors. Instead, it receives voluntary tips from donors. The model was not intended to generate large profits.

== Funding and partnerships ==
Oath has received venture backing from Higher Ground Labs, an investment fund and accelerator focused on political technology for Democratic and progressive organizations.

In 2023, Oath was selected as one of the companies participating in the sixth Higher Ground Labs accelerator cohort. The accelerator described the company as a political advising platform intended to help Democratic donors identify races where financial support may have greater impact.

TIME identified Higher Ground Labs as Oath's largest initial funder in 2023. The publication also reported that Oath's early financing included contributions from friends, family and advisers.

== Reception ==
In November 2023, Time described Oath as an attempt to address inefficiencies in grassroots Democratic giving by directing donations toward competitive races with greater financial need. The magazine reported that some Democratic strategists viewed efforts to increase funding for down-ballot races favorably, while noting that Oath remained relatively little known within the Democratic fundraising industry.

In 2026, Inside Political Money described Oath as having grown from a side project into a substantial Democratic fundraising operation. The publication reported that Oath employed a team of approximately 30 people, including engineers and data analysts, and monitored thousands of races

== See also ==
- ActBlue
- Campaign finance in the United States
