= T. J. Shope =

American politician (born 1985)

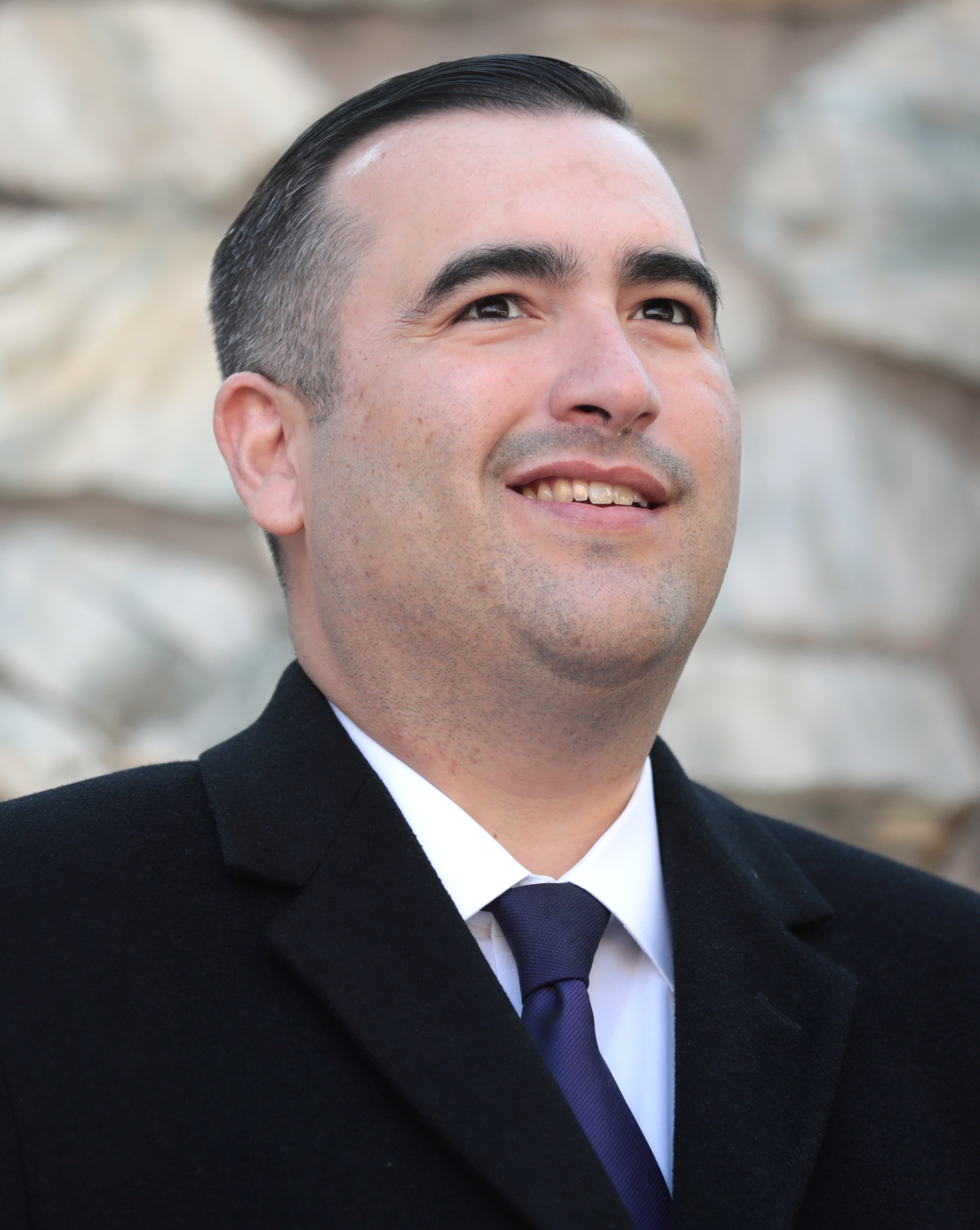

President pro tempore of the Arizona Senate
- Incumbent
- Assumed office January 9, 2023
- Preceded by: Vince Leach

Member of the Arizona Senate
- Incumbent
- Assumed office January 11, 2021
- Preceded by: Frank Pratt
- Succeeded by: Elaine Aldrete (elect)
- Constituency: 8th district (2021–2023); 16th district (2023–present)

Speaker pro tempore of the Arizona House of Representatives
- In office January 9, 2017 – January 11, 2021
- Preceded by: Bob Robson
- Succeeded by: Travis Grantham

Member of the Arizona House of Representatives from the 8th district
- In office January 14, 2013 – January 11, 2021
- Preceded by: Michelle Ugenti-Rita
- Succeeded by: Frank Pratt

Personal details
- Born: Thomas Ray Shope Jr. August 12, 1985 (age 41) Florence, Arizona, U.S.
- Party: Republican
- Education: Central Arizona College (AA; Arizona State University, Tempe (BS)

Thomas Ray "T. J." Shope Jr. (born August 12, 1985) is an American Republican politician and businessman who has been a member of the Arizona Legislature from the 16th Legislative District, which covers central and eastern Pinal County and southern Gila County. First elected to the Arizona House of Representatives in 2012, he was a member of the House from January 2013 to January 2021; in the latter part of his time in the state House, he was Speaker Pro Tempore. Shope was elected to the Arizona State Senate in November 2020, and took office in January 2021.

== Early life ==
Shope was born in Florence, Arizona, in 1985, to Thomas "Tom" Shope Sr. and Luz Shope and resides in Coolidge, Arizona. A third-generation elected official, Shope's father was a former mayor of Coolidge, and his grandfather was a member of the city council. Shope's family owned a grocery store in Coolidge for over 70 years.

He received his bachelor's degree from Arizona State University in 2008.

== Political career ==
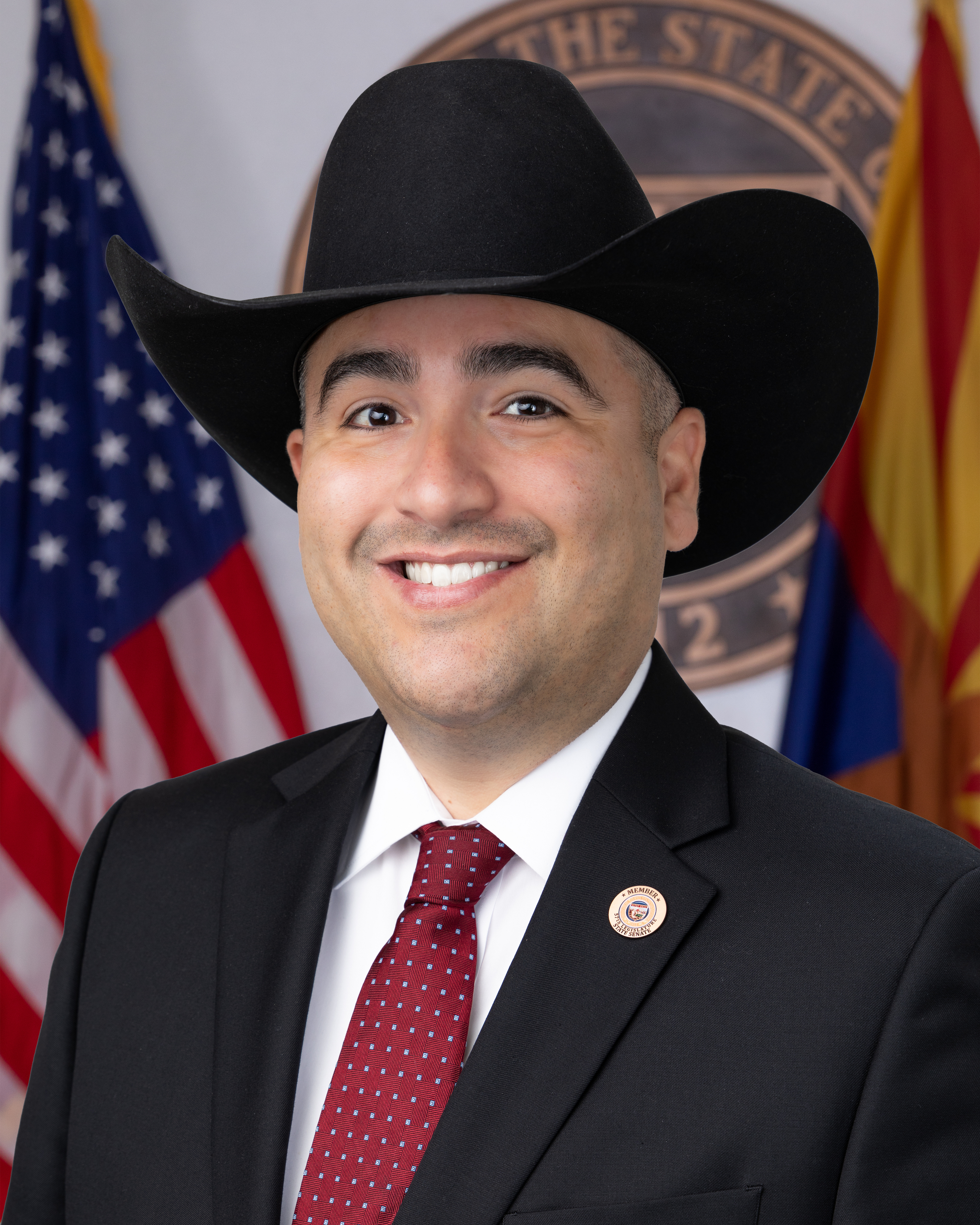
Official Arizona Senate portrait, 2025

Shope was a member of a local school board before seeking election to the Arizona House of Representatives as a Republican. He was first elected to the state House in 2012, at age 27, from the 8th Legislative District. Shope's district is heavily rural and Republican-dominated; it encompasses parts of Gila and Pinal counties, specifically Coolidge, Globe, Superior, Florence, San Tan Valley, and portions of Casa Grande and Eloy. He was reelected to the House in 2014, 2016, and 2018. Shope was speaker pro tempore of the state House.

In 2013–14, after initially taking a neutral position on Medicaid expansion under the Affordable Care Act, Shope became one of a handful of Republicans who joined Democrats in supporting Medicaid expansion (which extended health-care coverage to more low-income Arizonans). Medicaid expansion was supported by Governor Jan Brewer, but opposed by most Republican officials and right-wing activists.

In 2019, Shope sponsored legislation that repealed a 1991 state law barring HIV/AIDS instruction that "promotes a homosexual lifestyle" or "portrays homosexuality as a positive alternative lifestyle"; Shope said that the language was antiquated. The repeal passed the Senate on a 19–10 vote and the House on a 55–5 vote.

Shope sponsored a measure in 2019, supported by Governor Doug Ducey, to amend the Arizona State Constitution to repeal its provision for legislative immunity during and before the state legislative session; however, the bill was blocked by Speaker of the House Rusty Bowers.

In 2020, Shope was elected to the Arizona State Senate seat from the 8th Legislative District, defeating Democratic nominee Barbara McGuire.

In September 2020, ahead of the November 2020 presidential election, Shope endorsed Donald Trump and appeared at a Trump rally in Arizona. In December 2020, amid acrimonious infighting among Arizona Republicans about Trump's efforts to overturn his defeat in the election, Shope said that he supported Trump while simultaneously saying that a Republican turn to the far right would lead to the nomination of unelectable candidates who would repulse moderate voters.

In 2021, amid the COVID-19 pandemic in Arizona, Shope opposed an Arizona State University policy that required students who had not been vaccinated against COVID-19 to comply with CDC public health recommendations by taking twice-weekly COVID-19 tests and using face masks. (Republican governor Ducey subsequently issued an executive order blocking the ASU policy.) However, Shope sided with all Senate Democrats in opposing a bill, sponsored by Senate Republican Bret Roberts, to make it a crime for businesses to decline to serve customers who lacked proof of vaccination, and would authorize the state to shut down such businesses. Shope said he believed the proposal went too far and unfairly restricted the rights of private business owners.

Following the Arizona Supreme Court's decision to reinstate an 1864 Territorial abortion law that banned nearly all abortions without exceptions for rape and incest, Shope and Senator Shawnna Bolick were the first two legislative Republicans to call for its repeal. On May 1, 2024, Shope and Bolick voted with all Democrats in the State Senate 16–14 to repeal the ban, one week after the State House voted 32–28 too.

Arizona House of Representatives
Preceded by Bob Robson	Speaker pro tempore of the Arizona House of Representatives; 2017–2021	Succeeded by Travis Grantham
Arizona Senate
Preceded by Vince Leach	President pro tempore of the Arizona Senate; 2023–present	Incumbent
