= Eva Diaz (Arizona politician) =

American politician

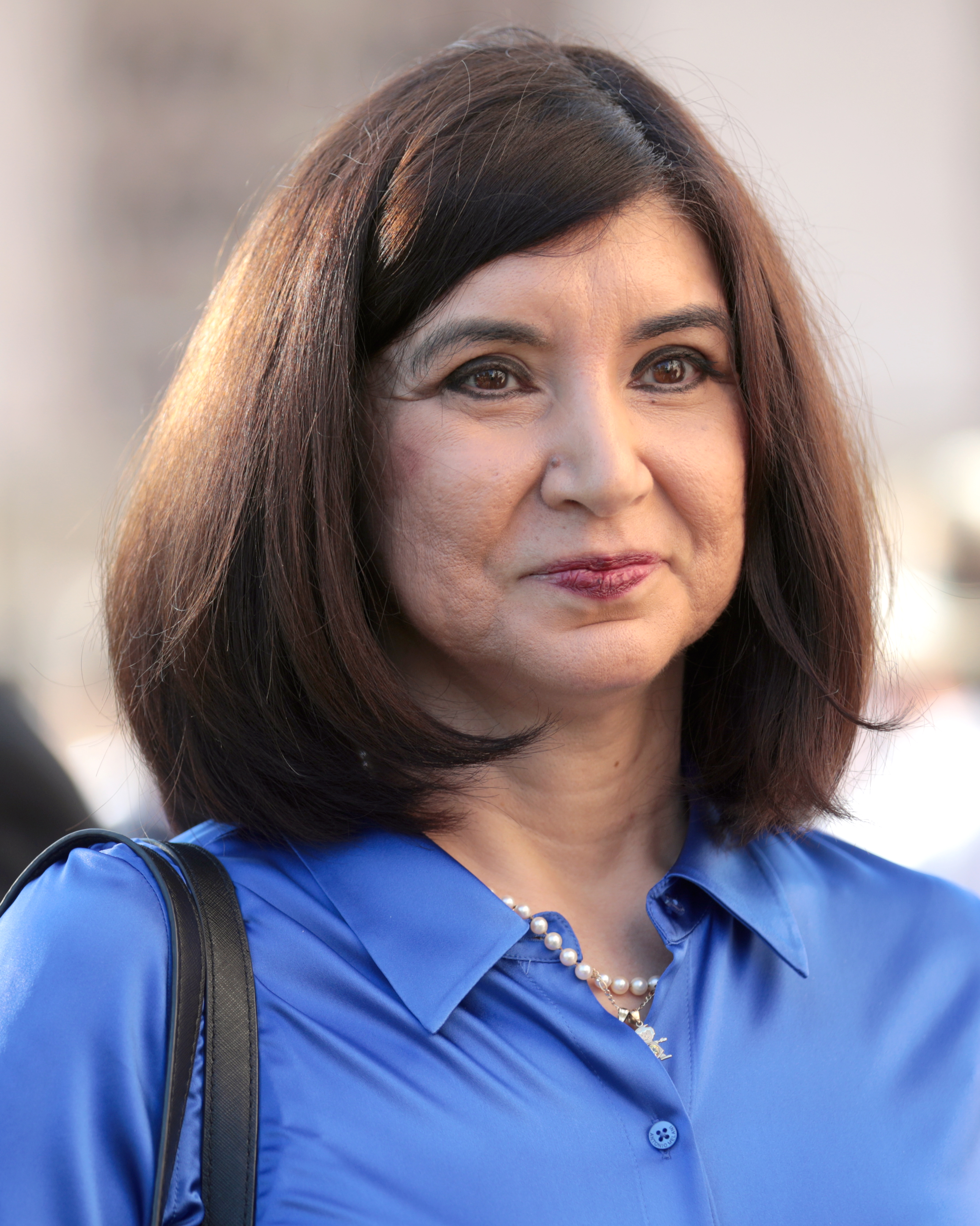
- Diaz in 2023

Member of the Arizona Senate from the 22nd district
- Incumbent
- Assumed office January 9, 2023
- Preceded by: David Livingston

Personal details
- Party: Democratic
- Education: Arizona State University

Eva Diaz is an American politician. Diaz was elected in 2022 to serve in the Arizona State Senate representing District 22 as a member of the Democratic Party, after mounting a write-in campaign as a result of the only candidate on the ballot, Diego Espinoza, withdrawing from the race.

Diaz has also served as Chair of the Tolleson Planning Commission since 2013.
