= Teresa Martinez =

American politician

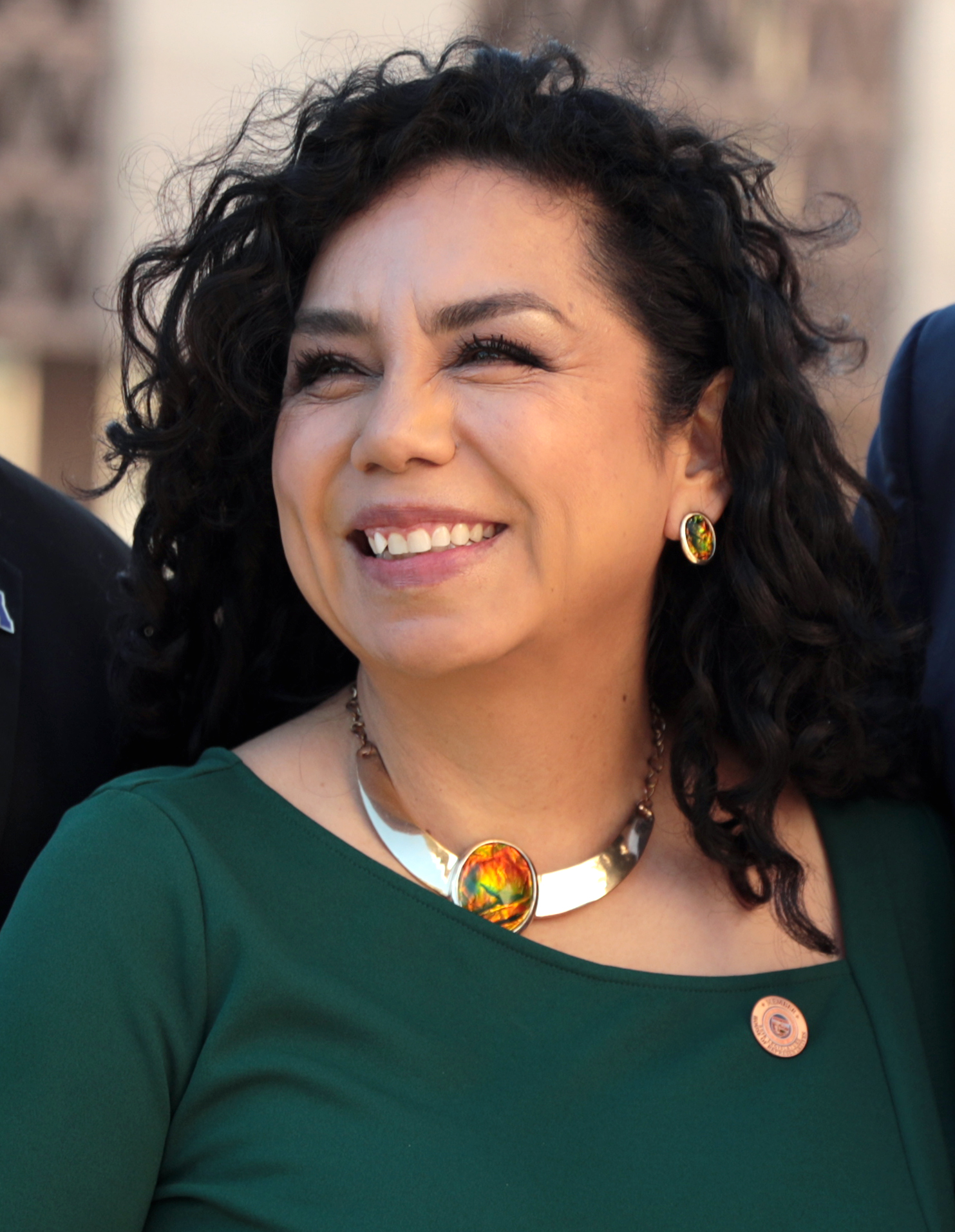
- Martinez in 2022

Member of the Arizona House of Representatives from the 16th district
- Incumbent
- Assumed office January 9, 2023 Serving with Chris Lopez
- Preceded by: Jacqueline Parker

Member of the Arizona House of Representatives from the 11th district
- In office November 1, 2021 – January 9, 2023
- Preceded by: Bret Roberts
- Succeeded by: Marcelino Quiñonez

Personal details
- Born: Casa Grande, Arizona, U.S.
- Party: Republican
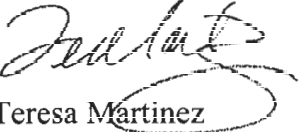
- Signature

Teresa Martinez is an American politician serving the 16th legislative district in the Arizona House of Representatives. She was initially appointed to the seat in 2021 after incumbent Representative Bret Roberts resigned from office. In 2022, she was elected for a full term.

Martinez was born and raised in Casa Grande, the heart of Pinal County. She is the oldest of 5 children and her dad was a miner at the San Manuel Mine.

She has worked on the staffs for Congressmen Rick Renzi and Paul Gosar, and Arizona Secretary of State Michelle Reagan. She was political director for the Arizona Republican Party.

Before getting into politics, Teresa worked as long-term substitute teacher at her alma mater Casa Grande Union High School for several years and at the Frito Lay factory in Casa Grande.

In 2024, she criticized efforts by Democratic members of the Arizona legislature to legislate protections for abortion rights after the Republican-controlled Arizona Supreme Court ruled that a near-total abortion ban was in effect. She argued, "There is no reason to rush on this very important topic."
