= Theresa Hatathlie =

American Navajo politician

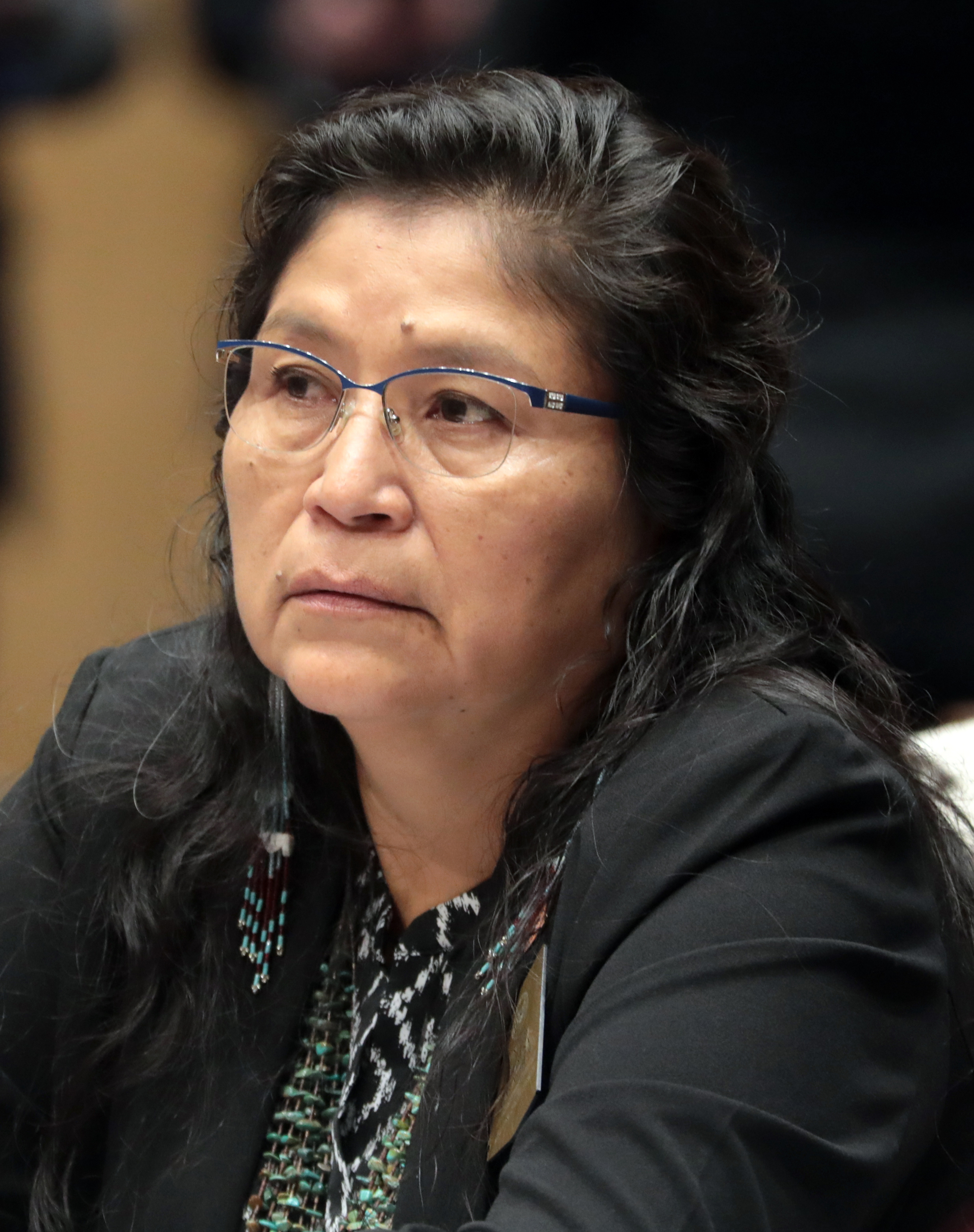

Member of the Arizona Senate from the 6th district
- Incumbent
- Assumed office January 9, 2023
- Preceded by: Wendy Rogers

Member of the Arizona Senate from the 7th district
- In office January 10, 2022 – January 9, 2023
- Preceded by: Jamescita Peshlakai
- Succeeded by: Wendy Rogers

Personal details
- Party: Democratic
- Education: Northern Arizona University

Theresa Hatathlie is an American Navajo politician who has served as a member of the Arizona Senate from the 6th district since 2023. She was appointed to the District 7 seat in 2022 after incumbent State Senator Jamescita Peshlakai resigned from office. She is a member of the Democratic Party.

In addition to serving in the legislature, Hatathlie is a member of the Diné College Board of Regents, and co-founded the Navajo and Hopi Families COVID-19 Relief Fund. Hatathlie is from Coal Mine Mesa, a town in Coconino County, Arizona.

Hatathlie ran unopposed in the newly redrawn 6th District in the 2022 November election.

== See also ==
- List of Native American politicians
- Native American women in politics
