= Arizona's 16th legislative district =

American legislative district

- Map of District 16: Approved January 21, 2022
- Senator: T. J. Shope (R)
- House members: Teresa Martinez (R); Chris Lopez (R)
- Registration: 33.60% Republican; 27.81% Democratic; 36.81% Other
- Demographics: 45% White; 7% Black/African American; 8% Native American; 3% Asian; 35% Hispanic
- Population: 236,940
- Voting-age population: 180,256
- Registered voters: 138,464

Arizona's 16th legislative district is one of 30 in the state, consisting of sections of Maricopa County, Pima County, and Pinal County. As of 2023, there are 72 precincts in the district, two in Maricopa, 17 in Pima, and 53 in Pinal, with a total registered voter population of 138,464. The district has an overall population of 236,940.

Following the 2020 United States redistricting cycle, the Arizona Independent Redistricting Commission (AIRC) redrew legislative district boundaries in Arizona. According to the AIRC, the district is highly competitive politically.

== Political representation ==
The district is represented in the 57th Arizona State Legislature, which convenes from January 1, 2025, to December 31, 2026, by T. J. Shope (R-Coolidge) in the Arizona Senate and by Teresa Martinez (R-Casa Grande) and Chris Lopez (R-Casa Grande) in the Arizona House of Representatives.

Name	Image	Residence	Office	Party
T. J. Shope		Coolidge	State senator	Republican
Teresa Martinez		Casa Grande	State representative	Republican
Chris Lopez		Casa Grande	State representative	Republican

== Election results ==
The 2022 elections were the first in the newly drawn district.

=== Arizona Senate ===
2022 Arizona's 16th Senate district election
Party	Candidate	Votes	%
Republican	T. J. Shope (incumbent)	41,057	55.71
Democratic	Taylor Kerby	32,636	44.29
Total votes		73,693	100
Republican hold			

2024 Arizona's 16th Senate district election
Party	Candidate	Votes	%
Republican	T. J. Shope (incumbent)	58,386	55.99
Democratic	Stacey Seaman	45,888	44.01
Total votes		104,274	100
Republican hold			

=== Arizona House of Representatives ===
2022 Arizona House of Representatives election, 16th district
Party	Candidate	Votes	%
Republican	Teresa Martinez (incumbent)	37,308	36.46
Democratic	Keith Seaman	32,831	32.08
Republican	Rob Hudelson	32,187	31.46
Total votes		102,326	100.00
Republican hold			
Democratic gain from Republican			

2024 Arizona House of Representatives election, 16th district
Party	Candidate	Votes	%
Republican	Teresa Martinez (incumbent)	53,783	36.26
Republican	Chris Lopez	49,099	33.10
Democratic	Keith Seaman (incumbent)	45,444	30.64
Total votes		102,326	100.00
Republican hold			
Republican gain from Democratic			

== See also ==
- List of Arizona legislative districts
- Arizona State Legislature
