= Arizona's 24th legislative district =

American legislative district

- Map of District 24: Approved January 21, 2022
- Senator: Analise Ortiz (D)
- House members: Anna Abeytia (D); Lydia Hernandez (D)
- Registration: 38.04% Democratic; 20.69% Republican; 39.57% Other
- Demographics: 20% White; 8% Black/African American; 2% Native American; 3% Asian; 65% Hispanic
- Population: 234,992
- Voting-age population: 163,820
- Registered voters: 87,214

Arizona's 24th legislative district is one of 30 in the state, consisting of a section of Maricopa County. As of 2023, there are 38 precincts in the district, all in Maricopa, with a total registered voter population of 87,214. The district has an overall population of 234,992.

Following the 2020 United States redistricting cycle, the Arizona Independent Redistricting Commission (AIRC) redrew legislative district boundaries in Arizona. The 24th district was drawn as a majority Latino constituency, with 65% of residents being Hispanic or Latino. According to the AIRC, the district is outside of competitive range and considered leaning Democratic.

== Political representation ==
The district is represented in the 57th Arizona State Legislature, which convenes from January 1, 2025, to December 31, 2026, by Analise Ortiz (D-Phoenix) in the Arizona Senate and by Anna Abeytia (D-Phoenix) and Lydia Hernandez (D-Phoenix) in the Arizona House of Representatives.

Name	Image	Residence	Office	Party
Analise Ortiz		Phoenix	State senator	Democrat
Anna Abeytia		Phoenix	State representative	Democrat
Lydia Hernandez		Phoenix	State representative	Democrat

== Election results ==
The 2022 elections were the first in the newly drawn district.

=== Arizona Senate ===
2022 Arizona's 24th Senate district election
Party	Candidate	Votes	%
Democratic	Anna Hernandez	25,984	100
Total votes		25,984	100
Democratic hold			

=== Arizona House of Representatives ===
2022 Arizona House of Representatives election, 24th district
Party	Candidate	Votes	%
Democratic	Analise Ortiz	20,403	50.50
Democratic	Lydia Hernandez	19,999	49.50
Total votes		40,402	100.00
Democratic hold			
Democratic hold			

== See also ==
- List of Arizona legislative districts
- Arizona State Legislature
