= Arizona Senate =

Upper house of the Arizona State Legislature

Coordinates: 33°26′53″N 112°5′45″W

Arizona State Senate
- 57th Arizona Legislature

Type
- Type: Upper house
- Term limits: 4 terms (8 years)

History
- New session started: January 13, 2025

Leadership
- President: Warren Petersen (R) since January 9, 2023
- President pro tempore: T. J. Shope (R) since January 9, 2023
- Majority Leader: John Kavanagh (R) since June 27, 2025
- Minority Leader: Priya Sundareshan (D) since January 13, 2025

Structure
- Seats: 30 senators
- Political groups: Majority: Republican (17); Minority: Democratic (13)
- Length of term: 2 years
- Authority: Article 4, Arizona Constitution
- Salary: $24,000/year + per diem

Elections
- Last election: November 5, 2024 (30 seats)
- Next election: November 4, 2026 (30 seats)
- Redistricting: Arizona Independent Redistricting Commission

Meeting place
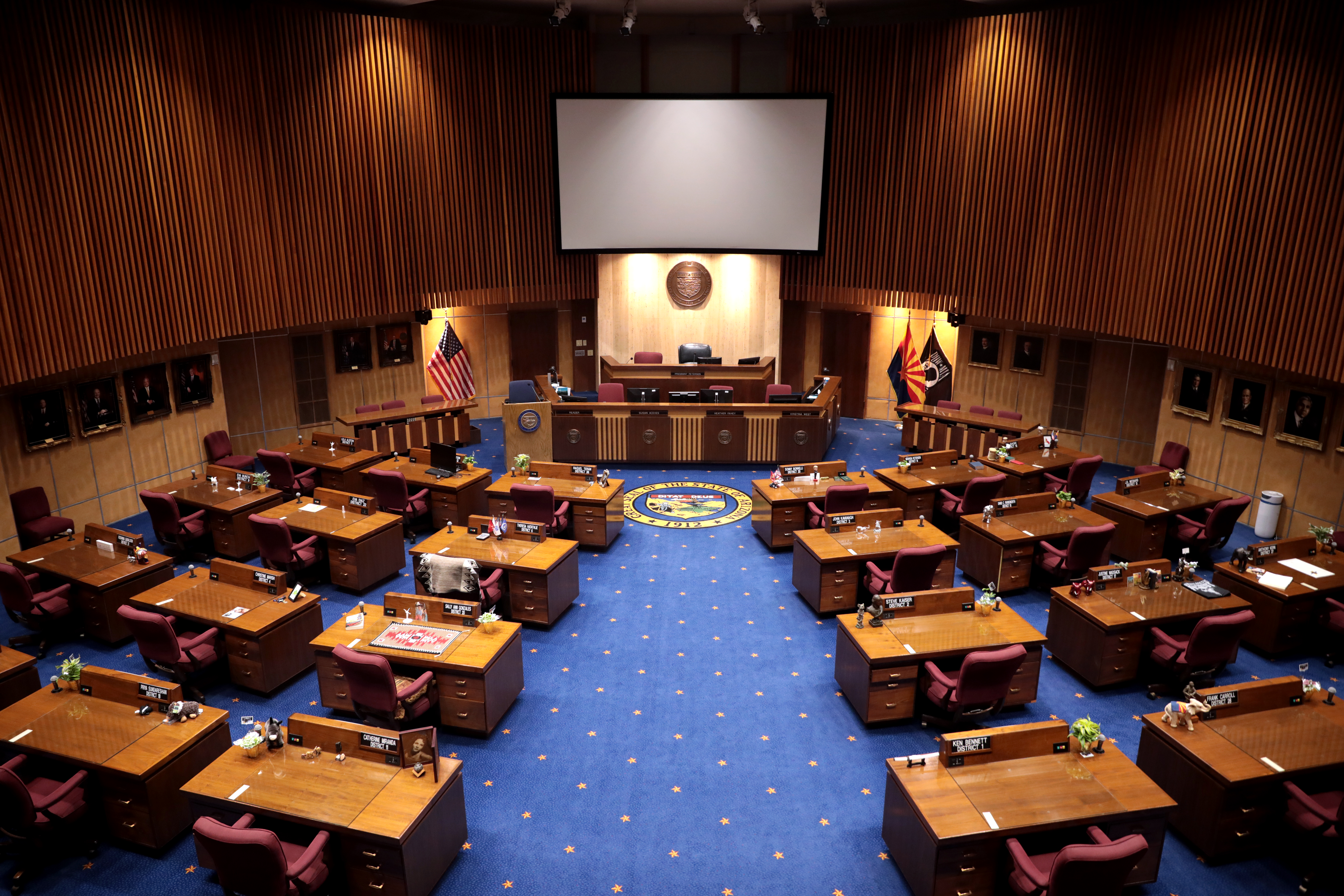
- State Senate Chamber; Arizona State Capitol; 1700 W. Washington St. Phoenix, Arizona • 85007

Website
- Arizona State Senate

Rules
- Senate Rules

The Arizona State Senate is part of the Arizona Legislature, the state legislature of the US state of Arizona. The Senate consists of 30 members each representing an average of 219,859 constituents (2009 figures). Members serve two-year terms with term limits that limit Senators to a maximum four consecutive terms (eight years) before requiring a one-term respite prior to running again. Members of the Republican Party are currently the majority in the Senate.

Members to the Senate are elected from the same legislative districts as the Arizona House of Representatives; however, one senator represents the constituency, while for the House there are two Representatives per district. This districting system is similar to those of the New Jersey, Idaho, and Washington State Senates. In political science, this type of legislative district is called a multi-member district.

Like other upper houses of state and territorial legislatures and the federal United States Senate, the Senate can confirm or reject gubernatorial appointments to the state cabinet, commissions and boards.

The Senate convenes in the adjacent legislative chambers at the Arizona State Capitol in Phoenix. The last election occurred on November 3, 2026, with the Democratic Party securing a supermajority in the Senate.

== Leadership ==
Unlike in other states, where an elected lieutenant governor presides over the senate, in Arizona, the Senate elects its own presiding officer, the president of the Senate, who presides over the body, appoints members to all of the Senate's committees and to joint committees, and may create other committees and subcommittees if desired. The Senate president also appoints a president pro tempore, who serves for the duration of a session of the legislature, to preside in their absence, and may appoint a temporary president pro tempore in the absence of the president and president pro tempore.

The current president of the Senate is Republican Warren Petersen of district 14, the Senate Majority Leader is Janae Shamp of district 29. The current minority leader is Priya Sundareshan of district 18 with Catherine Miranda of district 11 as the assistant minority leader.

=== Leadership information ===
Position	Name	Party	Residence	District
President of the Senate	Warren Petersen	Republican	Gilbert	District 14
President pro tempore	T. J. Shope	Republican	Coolidge	District 16
Majority leader	John Kavanagh	Republican	Scottsdale	District 3
Majority whip	Frank Carroll	Republican	Surprise	District 28
Minority leader	Priya Sundareshan	Democratic	Tucson	District 18
Assistant minority leader	Catherine Miranda	Democratic	Phoenix	District 11
Minority whip	Rosanna Gabaldón	Democratic	Sahuarita	District 21
Minority caucus chair	Lela Alston	Democratic	Phoenix	District 5

== Current composition ==
↓
13	17
Democratic	Republican

Affiliation	Party (shading indicates majority caucus)		Total	Vacant
Affiliation	Republican	Democratic	Total	Vacant
2011–12	21	9	29	1
2013–14	17	13	30	0
Begin 2015	17	13	30	0
End 2016	18	12	30	0
2017–18	17	13	30	0
2019–20	17	13	30	0
2021–22	16	14	30	0
2023–24	16	14	30	0
Begin 2025	17	13	30	0
March 14, 2025 (Note: Eva Burch (District 9) resigned)	17	12	29	1
March 31, 2025 (Note: Kiana Sears was sworn in to succeed Burch)	17	13	30	0
Latest voting share	56.7%	43.3%		

== Current members, 2025–2027 ==
District	Name	Party	Residence	First Election	Term Limited
1	Mark Finchem	Rep	Prescott	2024	No
2	Shawnna Bolick	Rep	Phoenix	2023 (Note: Appointed.)	No
3	John Kavanagh	Rep	Scottsdale	2022	No
4	Carine Werner	Rep	Scottsdale	2024	No
5	Lela Alston (Note: Alston represented the 24th district from 2019–2023.)	Dem	Phoenix	2018	Yes
6	Theresa Hatathlie	Dem	Coal Mine Mesa	2022	No
7	Wendy Rogers	Rep	Flagstaff	2022	No
8	Lauren Kuby	Dem	Tempe	2024	No
9	Kiana Sears	Dem	Mesa	2025	No
10	Dave Farnsworth	Rep	Mesa	2022	No
11	Catherine Miranda	Dem	Phoenix	2022	No
12	Mitzi Epstein	Dem	Chandler	2022	No
13	J. D. Mesnard (Note: Mesnard represented the 17th district from 2019–2023.)	Rep	Chandler	2018	Yes
14	Warren Petersen	Rep	Gilbert	2020	No
15	Jake Hoffman	Rep	Queen Creek	2022	No
16	T. J. Shope	Rep	Coolidge	2022	No
17	Vince Leach	Rep	Tucson	2024	No
18	Priya Sundareshan	Dem	Tucson	2022	No
19	David Gowan	Rep	Sierra Vista	2022	No
20	Sally Ann Gonzales	Dem	Tucson	2022	No
21	Rosanna Gabaldón	Dem	Sahuarita	2022	No
22	Eva Diaz	Dem	Tolleson	2022	No
23	Brian Fernandez	Dem	Yuma	2022	No
24	Analise Ortiz	Dem	Phoenix	2024	No
25	Tim Dunn	Rep	Yuma	2024	No
26	Flavio Bravo	Dem	Phoenix	2023	No
27	Kevin Payne	Rep	Sun City	2024	No
28	Frank Carroll	Rep	Surprise	2022	No
29	Janae Shamp	Rep	Surprise	2022	No
30	Hildy Angius	Rep	Bullhead City	2024	No

== Committees ==
The current standing committees of the Arizona Senate are as follows:

Committee	Chair	Vice Chair	Ranking Member
Appropriations	John Kavanagh	David Farnsworth	Not Listed
Director Nominations	Jake Hoffman	T. J. Shope	Not Listed
Education and Transportation	David Farnsworth	Carine Werner	Eva Diaz
Federalism	Mark Finchem	Hildy Angius	Priya Sundareshan
Finance	J. D. Mesnard	Vince Leach	Mitzi Epstein
Government	Jake Hoffman	Wendy Rogers	Lauren Kuby
Health & Human Services	Carine Werner	T. J. Shope	Sally Ann Gonzales
Judiciary and Elections	Wendy Rogers	John Kavanagh	Analise Ortiz
Military Affairs and Border Security	David Gowan	Janae Shamp	Catherine Miranda
Natural Resources, Energy & Water	T. J. Shope	Tim Dunn	Rosanna Gabaldón
Public Safety	Kevin Payne	Hildy Angius	Kiana Sears
Regulatory Affairs and Government Efficiency	Shawnna Bolick	Frank Carroll	Mitzi Epstein
Rules	David Farnsworth	Janae Shamp	Flavio Bravo

== See also ==
- Arizona State Capitol
- Arizona Legislature
- Arizona House of Representatives
- List of representatives and senators of Arizona Legislature by districts (2023–2033)
- List of Arizona state legislatures
- List of state and territorial capitols in the United States
