= 2011 Men's Junior World Handball Championship =

Tournament details
- Host country: Greece
- Venues: 4 (in 1 host city)
- Dates: July 17–31
- Teams: 24 (from 4 confederations)

Final positions
- Champions: Germany (2nd title)
- Runners-up: Denmark
- Third place: Tunisia
- Fourth place: Egypt

Tournament statistics
- Matches played: 100
- Goals scored: 5,712 (57.12 per match)
- Top scorer: (Iran) Sajjad Esteki (91)

Awards
- Best player: (Germany) Christian Dissinger

The 2011 Men's Junior World Handball Championship was the 18th edition of the tournament and was held at Thessaloniki, Greece from July 17–31, 2011.

In a rematch of the 2009 final Germany defeated Denmark 27–18 in the final.

== Format ==
The 24 teams were allocated into six groups with the first four advancing to the eighthfinals in a knock-out system until the final.

Oceania withdrew their participation at the tournament, Norway replaced the Oceanian team.

Uruguay withdrew and has been replacer by Venezuela as the first substitute of the Pan-American continent.

The draw took place at April 16, 2011 at 12:00 local time in Thessaloniki, Greece. The schedule was announced on June 21.

== Preliminary round ==
=== Group A ===
Team	Pld	W	D	L	GF	GA	GD	Pts
Slovenia	5	4	0	1	159	125	+34	8
Tunisia	5	4	0	1	158	115	+43	8
France	5	3	1	1	143	132	+11	7
Norway	5	2	1	2	148	140	+8	5
Serbia	5	1	0	4	125	125	0	2
Chile	5	0	0	5	92	188	−96	0

Source: IHF

All times are local (UTC+3).

17 July 2011; 14:30	Serbia	35 – 19	Chile	YMCA indoor hall, Thessaloniki; Referees: Abdelaziz, Rashed (EGY)
17 July 2011; 14:30	Pavić 8	(17–7)	Feuchtmann 6	YMCA indoor hall, Thessaloniki; Referees: Abdelaziz, Rashed (EGY)
17 July 2011; 14:30	3× (yellow card) 2× (suspension)	Report	3× (yellow card) 3× (suspension)	YMCA indoor hall, Thessaloniki; Referees: Abdelaziz, Rashed (EGY)

17 July 2011; 16:30	Slovenia	32 – 28	Tunisia	Mikras 3 - Spiti tou Handbol, Thessaloniki; Referees: Al-Marxzouqi, Al-Nuaimi (UAE)
17 July 2011; 16:30	Marguč 10	(17–15)	Ben Salah 8	Mikras 3 - Spiti tou Handbol, Thessaloniki; Referees: Al-Marxzouqi, Al-Nuaimi (UAE)
17 July 2011; 16:30	3× (yellow card) 5× (suspension)	Report	3× (yellow card) 3× (suspension)	Mikras 3 - Spiti tou Handbol, Thessaloniki; Referees: Al-Marxzouqi, Al-Nuaimi (UAE)

17 July 2011; 18:30	France	29 – 29	Norway	Mikras 3 - Spiti tou Handbol, Thessaloniki; Referees: Horvath, Marton (HUN)
17 July 2011; 18:30	Mahé 7	(17–15)	Tønnesen 5	Mikras 3 - Spiti tou Handbol, Thessaloniki; Referees: Horvath, Marton (HUN)
17 July 2011; 18:30	3× (yellow card) 5× (suspension)	Report	2× (yellow card) 4× (suspension)	Mikras 3 - Spiti tou Handbol, Thessaloniki; Referees: Horvath, Marton (HUN)

18 July 2011; 14:00	Tunisia	31 – 22	France	YMCA indoor hall, Thessaloniki; Referees: Opava, Valek (CZE)
18 July 2011; 14:00	Sanai 7	(14–9)	Capella 7	YMCA indoor hall, Thessaloniki; Referees: Opava, Valek (CZE)
18 July 2011; 14:00	2× (yellow card) 6× (suspension)	Report	3× (yellow card) 1× (suspension)	YMCA indoor hall, Thessaloniki; Referees: Opava, Valek (CZE)

18 July 2011; 14:30	Norway	29 – 26	Serbia	PAOK Sports Arena, Thessaloniki; Referees: Volodkov, Zotin (RUS)
18 July 2011; 14:30	Tønnesen 8	(16–9)	Nenadić 7	PAOK Sports Arena, Thessaloniki; Referees: Volodkov, Zotin (RUS)
18 July 2011; 14:30	3× (yellow card) 2× (suspension)	Report	3× (yellow card) 2× (suspension)	PAOK Sports Arena, Thessaloniki; Referees: Volodkov, Zotin (RUS)

18 July 2011; 18:30	Chile	23 – 42	Slovenia	Mikras 3 - Spiti tou Handbol, Thessaloniki; Referees: Mousavian, Taghavi (IRN)
18 July 2011; 18:30	Feuchtmann 7	(12–19)	Medved 10	Mikras 3 - Spiti tou Handbol, Thessaloniki; Referees: Mousavian, Taghavi (IRN)
18 July 2011; 18:30	3× (yellow card) 2× (suspension)	Report	3× (yellow card) 1× (suspension)	Mikras 3 - Spiti tou Handbol, Thessaloniki; Referees: Mousavian, Taghavi (IRN)

19 July 2011; 14:30	Tunisia	35 – 12	Chile	YMCA indoor hall, Thessaloniki; Referees: Al Mutawa, Al Suwailem (KUW)
19 July 2011; 14:30	Boughanmi 7	(19–6)	Feuchtmann 3	YMCA indoor hall, Thessaloniki; Referees: Al Mutawa, Al Suwailem (KUW)
19 July 2011; 14:30	2× (yellow card) 5× (suspension)	Report	3× (yellow card) 4× (suspension)	YMCA indoor hall, Thessaloniki; Referees: Al Mutawa, Al Suwailem (KUW)

19 July 2011; 16:30	Slovenia	30 – 24	Norway	Mikras 3 - Spiti tou Handbol, Thessaloniki; Referees: Abdelaziz, Rashed (EGY)
19 July 2011; 16:30	Zarabec 8	(15–13)	Putans, Stroemberg 6	Mikras 3 - Spiti tou Handbol, Thessaloniki; Referees: Abdelaziz, Rashed (EGY)
19 July 2011; 16:30	3× (yellow card) 5× (suspension)	Report	3× (yellow card) 4× (suspension)	Mikras 3 - Spiti tou Handbol, Thessaloniki; Referees: Abdelaziz, Rashed (EGY)

19 July 2011; 18:30	France	24 – 23	Serbia	PAOK Sports Arena, Thessaloniki; Referees: Gousko, Repkin (BLR)
19 July 2011; 18:30	Mahé 7	(12–15)	Jokić 6	PAOK Sports Arena, Thessaloniki; Referees: Gousko, Repkin (BLR)
19 July 2011; 18:30	3× (yellow card) 6× (suspension) 1× (red card)	Report	3× (yellow card) 5× (suspension)	PAOK Sports Arena, Thessaloniki; Referees: Gousko, Repkin (BLR)

21 July 2011; 14:30	Serbia	19 – 28	Slovenia	Mikras 3 - Spiti tou Handbol, Thessaloniki; Referees: Cacador, Nicolau (POR)
21 July 2011; 14:30	Ilić 8	(9–15)	Marguč 7	Mikras 3 - Spiti tou Handbol, Thessaloniki; Referees: Cacador, Nicolau (POR)
21 July 2011; 14:30	2× (yellow card) 4× (suspension) 1× (red card)	Report	3× (yellow card) 7× (suspension)	Mikras 3 - Spiti tou Handbol, Thessaloniki; Referees: Cacador, Nicolau (POR)

21 July 2011; 16:30	France	37 – 22	Chile	Mikras 3 - Spiti tou Handbol, Thessaloniki; Referees: Al-Marxzouqi, Al-Nuaimi (UAE)
21 July 2011; 16:30	Gilbert 8	(18–13)	Feuchtmann 8	Mikras 3 - Spiti tou Handbol, Thessaloniki; Referees: Al-Marxzouqi, Al-Nuaimi (UAE)
21 July 2011; 16:30	3× (yellow card) 4× (suspension)	Report	3× (yellow card) 3× (suspension)	Mikras 3 - Spiti tou Handbol, Thessaloniki; Referees: Al-Marxzouqi, Al-Nuaimi (UAE)

21 July 2011; 16:30	Norway	27 – 39	Tunisia	PAOK Sports Arena, Thessaloniki; Referees: Pavićević, Ražnatović (MNE)
21 July 2011; 16:30	Gullerud 7	(18–20)	Boughanmi 10	PAOK Sports Arena, Thessaloniki; Referees: Pavićević, Ražnatović (MNE)
21 July 2011; 16:30	2× (yellow card) 2× (suspension)	Report	3× (yellow card) 3× (suspension)	PAOK Sports Arena, Thessaloniki; Referees: Pavićević, Ražnatović (MNE)

22 July 2011; 14:30	Serbia	22 – 25	Tunisia	YMCA indoor hall, Thessaloniki; Referees: Volodkov, Zotin (RUS)
22 July 2011; 14:30	Dimitrijević 6	(7–14)	Amri 6	YMCA indoor hall, Thessaloniki; Referees: Volodkov, Zotin (RUS)
22 July 2011; 14:30	3× (yellow card) 2× (suspension)	Report	3× (yellow card) 7× (suspension)	YMCA indoor hall, Thessaloniki; Referees: Volodkov, Zotin (RUS)

22 July 2011; 16:30	Chile	16 – 39	Norway	Mikras 3 - Spiti tou Handbol, Thessaloniki; Referees: Wyss, Zowa (SUI)
22 July 2011; 16:30	Feuchtmann 9	(8–17)	Gabrielsen 8	Mikras 3 - Spiti tou Handbol, Thessaloniki; Referees: Wyss, Zowa (SUI)
22 July 2011; 16:30	3× (yellow card) 7× (suspension)	Report	3× (yellow card) 4× (suspension)	Mikras 3 - Spiti tou Handbol, Thessaloniki; Referees: Wyss, Zowa (SUI)

22 July 2011; 18:30	Slovenia	27 – 31	France	Mikras 3 - Spiti tou Handbol, Thessaloniki; Referees: Horváth, Márton (HUN)
22 July 2011; 18:30	Cingesar 5	(14–12)	Mahé 7	Mikras 3 - Spiti tou Handbol, Thessaloniki; Referees: Horváth, Márton (HUN)
22 July 2011; 18:30	3× (yellow card) 6× (suspension)	Report	3× (yellow card) 4× (suspension)	Mikras 3 - Spiti tou Handbol, Thessaloniki; Referees: Horváth, Márton (HUN)

=== Group B ===
Team	Pld	W	D	L	GF	GA	GD	Pts
Denmark	5	5	0	0	159	99	+60	10
Algeria	5	3	0	2	139	121	+18	6
Greece	5	3	0	2	136	128	+8	6
Qatar	5	2	0	3	144	135	+9	4
Argentina	5	2	0	3	128	143	−15	4
Venezuela	5	0	0	5	96	176	−80	0

Source: IHF

All times are local (UTC+3).

17 July 2011; 18:30	Argentina	31 – 17	Venezuela	YMCA indoor hall, Thessaloniki; Referees: Krichen, Makhlouf (TUN)
17 July 2011; 18:30	Robert 8	(17–7)	Silva 6	YMCA indoor hall, Thessaloniki; Referees: Krichen, Makhlouf (TUN)
17 July 2011; 18:30	3× (yellow card) 3× (suspension)	Report	2× (yellow card) 11× (suspension)	YMCA indoor hall, Thessaloniki; Referees: Krichen, Makhlouf (TUN)

17 July 2011; 20:30	Denmark	30 – 19	Qatar	PAOK Sports Arena, Thessaloniki; Referees: Wyss, Zowa (SUI)
17 July 2011; 20:30	Wiesmach, Larsen 6	(14–11)	Salem 5	PAOK Sports Arena, Thessaloniki; Referees: Wyss, Zowa (SUI)
17 July 2011; 20:30	3× (yellow card) 2× (suspension)	Report	2× (yellow card) 4× (suspension)	PAOK Sports Arena, Thessaloniki; Referees: Wyss, Zowa (SUI)

17 July 2011; 21:00	Greece	25 – 28	Algeria	YMCA indoor hall, Thessaloniki; Referees: Gousko, Repkin (BLR)
17 July 2011; 21:00	Koutsikopoulos, Kouroumlidis 6	(11–12)	four players 5	YMCA indoor hall, Thessaloniki; Referees: Gousko, Repkin (BLR)
17 July 2011; 21:00	3× (yellow card) 4× (suspension)	Report	2× (yellow card) 4× (suspension) 1× (red card)	YMCA indoor hall, Thessaloniki; Referees: Gousko, Repkin (BLR)

18 July 2011; 16:00	Qatar	34 – 29	Argentina	YMCA indoor hall, Thessaloniki; Referees: Cacador, Nicolau (POR)
18 July 2011; 16:00	Al-Karbi 5	(18–14)	Arrom 8	YMCA indoor hall, Thessaloniki; Referees: Cacador, Nicolau (POR)
18 July 2011; 16:00	2× (yellow card) 7× (suspension)	Report	2× (yellow card) 4× (suspension)	YMCA indoor hall, Thessaloniki; Referees: Cacador, Nicolau (POR)

18 July 2011; 18:00	Algeria	22 – 23	Denmark	YMCA indoor hall, Thessaloniki; Referees: Al Mutawa, Al Suwailem (KUW)
18 July 2011; 18:00	three players 4	(11–13)	Wiesmach 7	YMCA indoor hall, Thessaloniki; Referees: Al Mutawa, Al Suwailem (KUW)
18 July 2011; 18:00	3× (yellow card) 4× (suspension)	Report	3× (yellow card) 2× (suspension)	YMCA indoor hall, Thessaloniki; Referees: Al Mutawa, Al Suwailem (KUW)

18 July 2011; 20:00	Venezuela	21 – 29	Greece	YMCA indoor hall, Thessaloniki; Referees: Horváth, Márton (HUN)
18 July 2011; 20:00	Silva 6	(8–14)	Tziras 10	YMCA indoor hall, Thessaloniki; Referees: Horváth, Márton (HUN)
18 July 2011; 20:00	2× (yellow card) 4× (suspension) 1× (red card)	Report	3× (yellow card) 4× (suspension)	YMCA indoor hall, Thessaloniki; Referees: Horváth, Márton (HUN)

19 July 2011; 16:30	Denmark	38 – 14	Venezuela	YMCA indoor hall, Thessaloniki; Referees: Opava, Valek (CZE)
19 July 2011; 16:30	Vium 7	(20–5)	Hurtado, Soto 3	YMCA indoor hall, Thessaloniki; Referees: Opava, Valek (CZE)
19 July 2011; 16:30	3× (yellow card) 3× (suspension)	Report	3× (yellow card) 3× (suspension) 1× (red card)	YMCA indoor hall, Thessaloniki; Referees: Opava, Valek (CZE)

19 July 2011; 18:30	Qatar	26 – 27	Algeria	YMCA indoor hall, Thessaloniki; Referees: Leszczynski, Piechota (POL)
19 July 2011; 18:30	Hamdoon 5	(14–11)	Hamoud 8	YMCA indoor hall, Thessaloniki; Referees: Leszczynski, Piechota (POL)
19 July 2011; 18:30	3× (yellow card) 2× (suspension)	Report	3× (yellow card) 5× (suspension)	YMCA indoor hall, Thessaloniki; Referees: Leszczynski, Piechota (POL)

19 July 2011; 20:30	Argentina	24 – 29	Greece	YMCA indoor hall, Thessaloniki; Referees: Mousavian, Taghavi (IRN)
19 July 2011; 20:30	Cantore 8	(7–11)	Tziras, Ioannidis 6	YMCA indoor hall, Thessaloniki; Referees: Mousavian, Taghavi (IRN)
19 July 2011; 20:30	3× (yellow card) 5× (suspension)	Report	2× (yellow card) 6× (suspension)	YMCA indoor hall, Thessaloniki; Referees: Mousavian, Taghavi (IRN)

21 July 2011; 14:30	Argentina	26 – 23	Algeria	YMCA indoor hall, Thessaloniki; Referees: Horváth, Márton (HUN)
21 July 2011; 14:30	Cangiani 7	(17–12)	Belaid 8	YMCA indoor hall, Thessaloniki; Referees: Horváth, Márton (HUN)
21 July 2011; 14:30	2× (yellow card) 5× (suspension)	Report	2× (yellow card) 8× (suspension)	YMCA indoor hall, Thessaloniki; Referees: Horváth, Márton (HUN)

21 July 2011; 18:30	Greece	26 – 29	Denmark	YMCA indoor hall, Thessaloniki; Referees: Volodkov, Zotin (RUS)
21 July 2011; 18:30	Nikolaidis 8	(15–14)	Larsen 9	YMCA indoor hall, Thessaloniki; Referees: Volodkov, Zotin (RUS)
21 July 2011; 18:30	3× (yellow card) 4× (suspension)	Report	2× (yellow card) 2× (suspension)	YMCA indoor hall, Thessaloniki; Referees: Volodkov, Zotin (RUS)

21 July 2011; 20:30	Venezuela	23 – 39	Qatar	YMCA indoor hall, Thessaloniki; Referees: Mousavian, Taghavi (IRI)
21 July 2011; 20:30	Silva 4	(11–18)	Salem 6	YMCA indoor hall, Thessaloniki; Referees: Mousavian, Taghavi (IRI)
21 July 2011; 20:30	3× (yellow card) 8× (suspension) 1× (red card)	Report	3× (yellow card) 5× (suspension) 1× (red card)	YMCA indoor hall, Thessaloniki; Referees: Mousavian, Taghavi (IRI)

22 July 2011; 16:30	Algeria	39 – 21	Venezuela	YMCA indoor hall, Thessaloniki; Referees: Gousko, Repkin (BLR)
22 July 2011; 16:30	three players 7	(22–8)	Silva 7	YMCA indoor hall, Thessaloniki; Referees: Gousko, Repkin (BLR)
22 July 2011; 16:30	3× (yellow card) 3× (suspension) 1× (red card)	Report	3× (yellow card) 5× (suspension)	YMCA indoor hall, Thessaloniki; Referees: Gousko, Repkin (BLR)

22 July 2011; 18:30	Denmark	40 – 18	Argentina	YMCA indoor hall, Thessaloniki; Referees: Al-Marxzouqi, Al-Nuaimi (UAE)
22 July 2011; 18:30	Zachariassen, Jakobsen 6	(22–10)	Cantore 4	YMCA indoor hall, Thessaloniki; Referees: Al-Marxzouqi, Al-Nuaimi (UAE)
22 July 2011; 18:30	2× (yellow card) 1× (suspension)	Report	3× (yellow card) 4× (suspension)	YMCA indoor hall, Thessaloniki; Referees: Al-Marxzouqi, Al-Nuaimi (UAE)

22 July 2011; 20:30	Greece	27 – 26	Qatar	YMCA indoor hall, Thessaloniki; Referees: Abdelaziz, Rashed (EGY)
22 July 2011; 20:30	Nikolaidis 5	(14–14)	Al-Sultan 7	YMCA indoor hall, Thessaloniki; Referees: Abdelaziz, Rashed (EGY)
22 July 2011; 20:30	3× (yellow card) 4× (suspension)	Report	2× (yellow card) 5× (suspension)	YMCA indoor hall, Thessaloniki; Referees: Abdelaziz, Rashed (EGY)

=== Group C ===
Team	Pld	W	D	L	GF	GA	GD	Pts
Germany	5	5	0	0	169	121	+48	10
Russia	5	4	0	1	153	128	+25	8
Egypt	5	3	0	2	153	123	+30	6
Brazil	5	2	0	3	139	138	+1	4
South Korea	5	1	0	4	154	169	−15	2
Benin	5	0	0	5	106	195	−89	0

Source: IHF

All times are local (UTC+3).

17 July 2011; 14:30	Germany	41 – 22	Benin	PAOK Sports Arena, Thessaloniki; Referees: Bethmann, Tzaferopoulos (GRE)
17 July 2011; 14:30	Russ 6	(21–10)	Quenum 5	PAOK Sports Arena, Thessaloniki; Referees: Bethmann, Tzaferopoulos (GRE)
17 July 2011; 14:30	3× (yellow card) 4× (suspension)	Report	3× (yellow card) 6× (suspension)	PAOK Sports Arena, Thessaloniki; Referees: Bethmann, Tzaferopoulos (GRE)

17 July 2011; 16:30	Egypt	30 – 33	Russia	PAOK Sports Arena, Thessaloniki; Referees: Cacador, Nicolau (POR)
17 July 2011; 16:30	Sanad 7	(14–16)	Zhedik 11	PAOK Sports Arena, Thessaloniki; Referees: Cacador, Nicolau (POR)
17 July 2011; 16:30	2× (yellow card) 4× (suspension)	Report	2× (yellow card) 6× (suspension) 2× (red card)	PAOK Sports Arena, Thessaloniki; Referees: Cacador, Nicolau (POR)

17 July 2011; 20:30	Brazil	36 – 32	South Korea	PAOK Sports Arena, Thessaloniki; Referees: Opava, Valek (CZE)
17 July 2011; 20:30	Rossoni 10	(19–18)	Park Such-eol 8	PAOK Sports Arena, Thessaloniki; Referees: Opava, Valek (CZE)
17 July 2011; 20:30	2× (yellow card) 6× (suspension)	Report	3× (yellow card) 3× (suspension)	PAOK Sports Arena, Thessaloniki; Referees: Opava, Valek (CZE)

18 July 2011; 16:30	Russia	22 – 27	Germany	PAOK Sports Arena, Thessaloniki; Referees: Mošorinski, Pandžić (SRB)
18 July 2011; 16:30	Zhedik, Bezhenar 4	(10–12)	Dissinger 9	PAOK Sports Arena, Thessaloniki; Referees: Mošorinski, Pandžić (SRB)
18 July 2011; 16:30	3× (yellow card) 6× (suspension) 1× (red card)	Report	2× (yellow card) 3× (suspension)	PAOK Sports Arena, Thessaloniki; Referees: Mošorinski, Pandžić (SRB)

18 July 2011; 18:30	South Korea	26 – 31	Egypt	PAOK Sports Arena, Thessaloniki; Referees: Cvetko, Kavalar (SLO)
18 July 2011; 18:30	Ko Ju-seok 7	(13–13)	Sanad 9	PAOK Sports Arena, Thessaloniki; Referees: Cvetko, Kavalar (SLO)
18 July 2011; 18:30	3× (yellow card) 2× (suspension)	Report	2× (yellow card) 2× (suspension)	PAOK Sports Arena, Thessaloniki; Referees: Cvetko, Kavalar (SLO)

18 July 2011; 18:30	Benin	21 – 39	Brazil	Evosmos Sports Hall, Thessaloniki; Referees: Wyss, Zowa (SUI)
18 July 2011; 18:30	Quenum 8	(12–20)	Nantes 9	Evosmos Sports Hall, Thessaloniki; Referees: Wyss, Zowa (SUI)
18 July 2011; 18:30	3× (yellow card) 8× (suspension) 1× (red card)	Report	2× (yellow card) 4× (suspension)	Evosmos Sports Hall, Thessaloniki; Referees: Wyss, Zowa (SUI)

19 July 2011; 14:30	Egypt	43 – 20	Benin	PAOK Sports Arena, Thessaloniki; Referees: Mošorinski, Pandžić (SRB)
19 July 2011; 14:30	Sanad 12	(22–10)	Sina 6	PAOK Sports Arena, Thessaloniki; Referees: Mošorinski, Pandžić (SRB)
19 July 2011; 14:30	3× (yellow card) 1× (suspension)	Report	3× (yellow card) 3× (suspension)	PAOK Sports Arena, Thessaloniki; Referees: Mošorinski, Pandžić (SRB)

19 July 2011; 18:30	Germany	29 – 23	Brazil	Mikras 3 - Spiti tou Handbol, Thessaloniki; Referees: Pavićević, Ražnatović (MNE)
19 July 2011; 18:30	Dissinger, Pekeler 6	(12–11)	Campos 7	Mikras 3 - Spiti tou Handbol, Thessaloniki; Referees: Pavićević, Ražnatović (MNE)
19 July 2011; 18:30	1× (yellow card) 3× (suspension)	Report	3× (yellow card) 2× (suspension)	Mikras 3 - Spiti tou Handbol, Thessaloniki; Referees: Pavićević, Ražnatović (MNE)

19 July 2011; 20:30	Russia	31 – 30	South Korea	PAOK Sports Arena, Thessaloniki; Referees: Krichen, Makhlouf (TUN)
19 July 2011; 20:30	Zhedik, Koshman 7	(15–17)	Ku Ju-seok 7	PAOK Sports Arena, Thessaloniki; Referees: Krichen, Makhlouf (TUN)
19 July 2011; 20:30	3× (yellow card) 12× (suspension)	Report	3× (yellow card) 3× (suspension)	PAOK Sports Arena, Thessaloniki; Referees: Krichen, Makhlouf (TUN)

21 July 2011; 18:30	Germany	46 – 33	South Korea	Mikras 3 - Spiti tou Handbol, Thessaloniki; Referees: Gousko, Repkin (BLR)
21 July 2011; 18:30	Hornke 9	(24–15)	Lee Hyeon-sik 8	Mikras 3 - Spiti tou Handbol, Thessaloniki; Referees: Gousko, Repkin (BLR)
21 July 2011; 18:30	3× (yellow card) 6× (suspension)	Report	3× (yellow card) 1× (suspension)	Mikras 3 - Spiti tou Handbol, Thessaloniki; Referees: Gousko, Repkin (BLR)

21 July 2011; 18:30	Brazil	18 – 28	Egypt	PAOK Sports Arena, Thessaloniki; Referees: Al Mutawa, Al Suwailem (KUW)
21 July 2011; 18:30	Campos 7	(9–11)	Sanad, Gamal 6	PAOK Sports Arena, Thessaloniki; Referees: Al Mutawa, Al Suwailem (KUW)
21 July 2011; 18:30	3× (yellow card) 5× (suspension)	Report	2× (yellow card) 4× (suspension)	PAOK Sports Arena, Thessaloniki; Referees: Al Mutawa, Al Suwailem (KUW)

21 July 2011; 20:30	Benin	18 – 39	Russia	PAOK Sports Arena, Thessaloniki; Referees: Opava, Valek (CZE)
21 July 2011; 20:30	Mama 5	(10–18)	Bespalov 7	PAOK Sports Arena, Thessaloniki; Referees: Opava, Valek (CZE)
21 July 2011; 20:30	2× (yellow card) 5× (suspension)	Report	3× (yellow card) 4× (suspension)	PAOK Sports Arena, Thessaloniki; Referees: Opava, Valek (CZE)

22 July 2011; 14:30	South Korea	33 – 25	Benin	PAOK Sports Arena, Thessaloniki; Referees: Leszczynski, Piechota (POL)
22 July 2011; 14:30	Seo Seung-Hyun 8	(12–12)	Ahossou 8	PAOK Sports Arena, Thessaloniki; Referees: Leszczynski, Piechota (POL)
22 July 2011; 14:30	3× (yellow card) 2× (suspension)	Report	3× (yellow card) 5× (suspension)	PAOK Sports Arena, Thessaloniki; Referees: Leszczynski, Piechota (POL)

22 July 2011; 18:30	Brazil	23 – 28	Russia	PAOK Sports Arena, Thessaloniki; Referees: Cvetko, Kavalar (SLO)
22 July 2011; 18:30	Campos 7	(12–15)	Koshman 5	PAOK Sports Arena, Thessaloniki; Referees: Cvetko, Kavalar (SLO)
22 July 2011; 18:30	2× (yellow card) 1× (suspension)	Report	3× (yellow card) 4× (suspension)	PAOK Sports Arena, Thessaloniki; Referees: Cvetko, Kavalar (SLO)

22 July 2011; 20:30	Egypt	21 – 26	Germany	PAOK Sports Arena, Thessaloniki; Referees: Mošorinski, Pandžić (SRB)
22 July 2011; 20:30	Sanad 6	(8–13)	Sellin, Dissinger 4	PAOK Sports Arena, Thessaloniki; Referees: Mošorinski, Pandžić (SRB)
22 July 2011; 20:30	3× (yellow card) 1× (suspension)	Report	3× (yellow card) 4× (suspension)	PAOK Sports Arena, Thessaloniki; Referees: Mošorinski, Pandžić (SRB)

=== Group D ===
Team	Pld	W	D	L	GF	GA	GD	Pts
Spain	5	5	0	0	192	117	+75	10
Portugal	5	4	0	1	176	125	+51	8
Sweden	5	3	0	2	180	122	+58	6
Iran	5	2	0	3	159	179	−20	4
Hungary	5	1	0	4	128	161	−33	2
Canada	5	0	0	5	99	230	−131	0

Source: IHF

All times are local (UTC+3).

17 July 2011; 18:30	Portugal	49 – 17	Canada	PAOK Sports Arena, Thessaloniki; Referees: Volodkov, Zotin (RUS)
17 July 2011; 18:30	Ferraz 8	(25–5)	Bilton 6	PAOK Sports Arena, Thessaloniki; Referees: Volodkov, Zotin (RUS)
17 July 2011; 18:30	3× (yellow card) 1× (suspension)	Report	2× (yellow card) 3× (suspension)	PAOK Sports Arena, Thessaloniki; Referees: Volodkov, Zotin (RUS)

17 July 2011; 18:30	Sweden	47 – 30	Iran	Evosmos Sports Hall, Thessaloniki; Referees: Cvetko, Kavalar (SLO)
17 July 2011; 18:30	Zakrisson 9	(26–15)	Jamali, Esteki 9	Evosmos Sports Hall, Thessaloniki; Referees: Cvetko, Kavalar (SLO)
17 July 2011; 18:30	3× (yellow card) 2× (suspension)	Report	1× (yellow card) 3× (suspension)	Evosmos Sports Hall, Thessaloniki; Referees: Cvetko, Kavalar (SLO)

17 July 2011; 20:30	Spain	33 – 19	Hungary	Evosmos Sports Hall, Thessaloniki; Referees: Mošorinski, Pandžić (SRB)
17 July 2011; 20:30	Cabanas 5	(17–5)	Pásztor 5	Evosmos Sports Hall, Thessaloniki; Referees: Mošorinski, Pandžić (SRB)
17 July 2011; 20:30	3× (yellow card) 3× (suspension)	Report	3× (yellow card) 2× (suspension)	Evosmos Sports Hall, Thessaloniki; Referees: Mošorinski, Pandžić (SRB)

18 July 2011; 16:30	Canada	20 – 40	Sweden	Mikras 3 - Spiti tou Handbol, Thessaloniki; Referees: Leszczynski, Piechota (POL)
18 July 2011; 16:30	Bilton 7	(10–20)	Svannel 6	Mikras 3 - Spiti tou Handbol, Thessaloniki; Referees: Leszczynski, Piechota (POL)
18 July 2011; 16:30	2× (yellow card) 3× (suspension)	Report	3× (yellow card) 4× (suspension) 1× (red card)	Mikras 3 - Spiti tou Handbol, Thessaloniki; Referees: Leszczynski, Piechota (POL)

18 July 2011; 16:30	Iran	24 – 43	Spain	Evosmos Sports Hall, Thessaloniki; Referees: Krichen, Makhlouf (TUN)
18 July 2011; 16:30	Jamali 8	(12–23)	Guedea 7	Evosmos Sports Hall, Thessaloniki; Referees: Krichen, Makhlouf (TUN)
18 July 2011; 16:30	3× (yellow card) 1× (suspension) 1× (red card)	Report	3× (yellow card) 3× (suspension)	Evosmos Sports Hall, Thessaloniki; Referees: Krichen, Makhlouf (TUN)

18 July 2011; 20:30	Hungary	21 – 32	Portugal	PAOK Sports Arena, Thessaloniki; Referees: Pavićević, Ražnatović (MNE)
18 July 2011; 20:30	Borsos, Takács 5	(10–14)	Ferraz 8	PAOK Sports Arena, Thessaloniki; Referees: Pavićević, Ražnatović (MNE)
18 July 2011; 20:30	2× (yellow card) 3× (suspension)	Report	2× (yellow card) 4× (suspension)	PAOK Sports Arena, Thessaloniki; Referees: Pavićević, Ražnatović (MNE)

19 July 2011; 16:30	Portugal	36 – 25	Iran	PAOK Sports Arena, Thessaloniki; Referees: Bethmann, Tzaferopoulos (GRE)
19 July 2011; 16:30	Duarte 7	(17–15)	Jamali 10	PAOK Sports Arena, Thessaloniki; Referees: Bethmann, Tzaferopoulos (GRE)
19 July 2011; 16:30	3× (yellow card) 5× (suspension)	Report	3× (yellow card) 8× (suspension)	PAOK Sports Arena, Thessaloniki; Referees: Bethmann, Tzaferopoulos (GRE)

19 July 2011; 16:30	Sweden	26 – 27	Spain	Evosmos Sports Hall, Thessaloniki; Referees: Al-Marxzouqi, Al-Nuaimi (UAE)
19 July 2011; 16:30	Nilsson 9	(12–12)	Cabanas 5	Evosmos Sports Hall, Thessaloniki; Referees: Al-Marxzouqi, Al-Nuaimi (UAE)
19 July 2011; 16:30	3× (yellow card)	Report	3× (yellow card) 3× (suspension)	Evosmos Sports Hall, Thessaloniki; Referees: Al-Marxzouqi, Al-Nuaimi (UAE)

19 July 2011; 18:30	Canada	21 – 42	Hungary	Evosmos Sports Hall, Thessaloniki; Referees: Cvetko, Kavalar (SLO)
19 July 2011; 18:30	Bilton 10	(9–19)	Pásztor 9	Evosmos Sports Hall, Thessaloniki; Referees: Cvetko, Kavalar (SLO)
19 July 2011; 18:30	2× (yellow card) 1× (suspension)	Report	3× (yellow card) 2× (suspension)	Evosmos Sports Hall, Thessaloniki; Referees: Cvetko, Kavalar (SLO)

21 July 2011; 16:30	Sweden	40 – 17	Hungary	Evosmos Sports Hall, Thessaloniki; Referees: Wyss, Zowa (SUI)
21 July 2011; 16:30	Adolfsson 6	(19–5)	four players 3	Evosmos Sports Hall, Thessaloniki; Referees: Wyss, Zowa (SUI)
21 July 2011; 16:30	3× (yellow card) 5× (suspension)	Report	2× (yellow card) 6× (suspension)	Evosmos Sports Hall, Thessaloniki; Referees: Wyss, Zowa (SUI)

21 July 2011; 16:30	Spain	35 – 31	Portugal	YMCA indoor hall, Thessaloniki; Referees: Cvetko, Kavalar (SLO)
21 July 2011; 16:30	Humet 7	(17–13)	Ferraz, Portela 6	YMCA indoor hall, Thessaloniki; Referees: Cvetko, Kavalar (SLO)
21 July 2011; 16:30	3× (yellow card) 2× (suspension)	Report	3× (yellow card) 5× (suspension)	YMCA indoor hall, Thessaloniki; Referees: Cvetko, Kavalar (SLO)

21 July 2011; 18:30	Iran	45 – 24	Canada	Evosmos Sports Hall, Thessaloniki; Referees: Leszczynski, Piechota (POL)
21 July 2011; 18:30	Esteki 15	(25–16)	Johnston 6	Evosmos Sports Hall, Thessaloniki; Referees: Leszczynski, Piechota (POL)
21 July 2011; 18:30	3× (yellow card) 4× (suspension) 1× (red card)	Report	3× (yellow card) 2× (suspension)	Evosmos Sports Hall, Thessaloniki; Referees: Leszczynski, Piechota (POL)

22 July 2011; 16:30	Hungary	29 – 35	Iran	Evosmos Sports Hall, Thessaloniki; Referees: Cacador, Nicolau (POR)
22 July 2011; 16:30	Pásztor 8	(16–18)	Jamali 12	Evosmos Sports Hall, Thessaloniki; Referees: Cacador, Nicolau (POR)
22 July 2011; 16:30	3× (yellow card) 4× (suspension)	Report	1× (yellow card) 3× (suspension) 1× (red card)	Evosmos Sports Hall, Thessaloniki; Referees: Cacador, Nicolau (POR)

22 July 2011; 16:30	Portugal	28 – 27	Sweden	PAOK Sports Arena, Thessaloniki; Referees: Pavićević, Ražnatović (MNE)
22 July 2011; 16:30	Ferraz 8	(14–16)	Arnesson 8	PAOK Sports Arena, Thessaloniki; Referees: Pavićević, Ražnatović (MNE)
22 July 2011; 16:30	2× (yellow card) 5× (suspension)	Report	3× (yellow card) 6× (suspension)	PAOK Sports Arena, Thessaloniki; Referees: Pavićević, Ražnatović (MNE)

22 July 2011; 18:30	Spain	54 – 17	Canada	Evosmos Sports Hall, Thessaloniki; Referees: Al Mutawa, Al Suwailem (KUW)
22 July 2011; 18:30	Cabanas 9	(27–11)	three players 3	Evosmos Sports Hall, Thessaloniki; Referees: Al Mutawa, Al Suwailem (KUW)
22 July 2011; 18:30	2× (yellow card) 2× (suspension)	Report	2× (yellow card) 1× (suspension)	Evosmos Sports Hall, Thessaloniki; Referees: Al Mutawa, Al Suwailem (KUW)

== Knockout stage ==
=== Championship ===
Round of 16
B1	Denmark	35
A4	Norway	30
D3	Sweden	40
C2	Russia	39
B3	Greece	21
A2	Tunisia	24
D1	Spain	39
C4	Brazil	24
C3	Egypt	30
D2	Portugal	29
A1	Slovenia	38
B4	Qatar	35
A3	France	32
B2	Algeria	26
C1	Germany	36
D4	Iran	29

Quarterfinals
B1	Denmark	28
D3	Sweden	27
A2	Tunisia	31
D1	Spain	30
C3	Egypt	26
A1	Slovenia	21
A3	France	23
C1	Germany	28

Semifinals
B1	Denmark	35
A2	Tunisia	21
C3	Egypt	24
C1	Germany	25

Final
B1	Denmark	18
C1	Germany	27
Third place
A2	Tunisia	24
C3	Egypt	18

==== Eightfinals ====
24 July 2011; 13:00	Spain	39 – 24	Brazil	PAOK Sports Arena, Thessaloniki; Referees: Abdelaziz, Rashed (EGY)
24 July 2011; 13:00	Cabanas, Goñi Leoz 6	(19–10)	Rossoni 6	PAOK Sports Arena, Thessaloniki; Referees: Abdelaziz, Rashed (EGY)
24 July 2011; 13:00	3× (yellow card) 3× (suspension)	Report	2× (yellow card) 1× (suspension)	PAOK Sports Arena, Thessaloniki; Referees: Abdelaziz, Rashed (EGY)

24 July 2011; 13:00	Germany	36 – 29	Iran	YMCA indoor hall, Thessaloniki; Referees: Krichen, Makhlouf (TUN)
24 July 2011; 13:00	Sellin, Russ 7	(16–14)	Esteki 10	YMCA indoor hall, Thessaloniki; Referees: Krichen, Makhlouf (TUN)
24 July 2011; 13:00	3× (yellow card) 6× (suspension)	Report	3× (yellow card) 3× (suspension)	YMCA indoor hall, Thessaloniki; Referees: Krichen, Makhlouf (TUN)

24 July 2011
15:30
Slovenia
38 – 35 (ET)
Qatar
PAOK Sports Arena, Thessaloniki
Referees: Bethmann, Tzaferipoulos (GRE)
Marguč 9
(17–14)
Alkhalaf 7
3× (yellow card) 10× (suspension)
Report
3× (yellow card) 5× (suspension) 2× (red card)

FT: 29–29 ET: 3–3, 6–3

24 July 2011; 15:30	France	32 – 26	Algeria	YMCA indoor hall, Thessaloniki; Referees: Cvetko, Kavalar (SLO)
24 July 2011; 15:30	Porte 7	(17–8)	Daoud 7	YMCA indoor hall, Thessaloniki; Referees: Cvetko, Kavalar (SLO)
24 July 2011; 15:30	3× (yellow card) 2× (suspension)	Report	3× (yellow card) 4× (suspension)	YMCA indoor hall, Thessaloniki; Referees: Cvetko, Kavalar (SLO)

24 July 2011; 18:00	Egypt	30 – 29	Portugal	YMCA indoor hall, Thessaloniki; Referees: Opava, Valek (CZE)
24 July 2011; 18:00	Sanad 7	(13–17)	Ramos 7	YMCA indoor hall, Thessaloniki; Referees: Opava, Valek (CZE)
24 July 2011; 18:00	2× (yellow card) 6× (suspension)	Report	3× (yellow card) 4× (suspension)	YMCA indoor hall, Thessaloniki; Referees: Opava, Valek (CZE)

24 July 2011; 18:00	Sweden	40 – 39	Russia	PAOK Sports Arena, Thessaloniki; Referees: Mošorinski, Pandžić (SRB)
24 July 2011; 18:00	Zakrisson 11	(16–17)	Zhedik 13	PAOK Sports Arena, Thessaloniki; Referees: Mošorinski, Pandžić (SRB)
24 July 2011; 18:00	3× (yellow card) 1× (suspension)	Report	3× (yellow card) 3× (suspension)	PAOK Sports Arena, Thessaloniki; Referees: Mošorinski, Pandžić (SRB)

24 July 2011; 20:30	Greece	21 – 24	Tunisia	YMCA indoor hall, Thessaloniki; Referees: Leszcynski, Piechota (POL)
24 July 2011; 20:30	Zampounis 6	(13–13)	Chouiref 6	YMCA indoor hall, Thessaloniki; Referees: Leszcynski, Piechota (POL)
24 July 2011; 20:30	3× (yellow card) 2× (suspension) 1× (red card)	Report	1× (yellow card) 2× (suspension)	YMCA indoor hall, Thessaloniki; Referees: Leszcynski, Piechota (POL)

24 July 2011; 20:30	Denmark	35 – 30	Norway	PAOK Sports Arena, Thessaloniki; Referees: Cacador, Nicolau (POR)
24 July 2011; 20:30	Wiesmach 14	(20–13)	Tønnesen 8	PAOK Sports Arena, Thessaloniki; Referees: Cacador, Nicolau (POR)
24 July 2011; 20:30	3× (yellow card) 1× (suspension)	Report	3× (yellow card) 2× (suspension)	PAOK Sports Arena, Thessaloniki; Referees: Cacador, Nicolau (POR)

==== Quarterfinals ====
26 July 2011; 18:00	Denmark	28 – 27	Sweden	YMCA indoor hall, Thessaloniki; Referees: Al-Marxzouqi, Al-Nuaimi (UAE)
26 July 2011; 18:00	Damgaard, Olsen 5	(17–17)	Nilsson 6	YMCA indoor hall, Thessaloniki; Referees: Al-Marxzouqi, Al-Nuaimi (UAE)
26 July 2011; 18:00	3× (yellow card) 1× (suspension)	Report	2× (yellow card) 6× (suspension)	YMCA indoor hall, Thessaloniki; Referees: Al-Marxzouqi, Al-Nuaimi (UAE)

26 July 2011; 18:00	Tunisia	31 – 30	Spain	PAOK Sports Arena, Thessaloniki; Referees: Horváth, Márton (HUN)
26 July 2011; 18:00	Bannour 12	(13–15)	Cabanas 6	PAOK Sports Arena, Thessaloniki; Referees: Horváth, Márton (HUN)
26 July 2011; 18:00	3× (yellow card) 8× (suspension)	Report	3× (yellow card) 3× (suspension)	PAOK Sports Arena, Thessaloniki; Referees: Horváth, Márton (HUN)

26 July 2011; 20:30	Egypt	26 – 21	Slovenia	YMCA indoor hall, Thessaloniki; Referees: Pavićević, Ražnatović (MNE)
26 July 2011; 20:30	Sanad 6	(12–10)	Nosan 5	YMCA indoor hall, Thessaloniki; Referees: Pavićević, Ražnatović (MNE)
26 July 2011; 20:30	3× (yellow card) 3× (suspension)	Report	3× (yellow card) 2× (suspension)	YMCA indoor hall, Thessaloniki; Referees: Pavićević, Ražnatović (MNE)

26 July 2011; 20:30	France	23 – 28	Germany	PAOK Sports Arena, Thessaloniki; Referees: Volodkov, Zotin (RUS)
26 July 2011; 20:30	Mahé 6	(12–12)	Sellin 6	PAOK Sports Arena, Thessaloniki; Referees: Volodkov, Zotin (RUS)
26 July 2011; 20:30	3× (yellow card) 8× (suspension)	Report	3× (yellow card) 6× (suspension)	PAOK Sports Arena, Thessaloniki; Referees: Volodkov, Zotin (RUS)

==== Semifinals ====
28 July 2011; 18:00	Denmark	35 – 21	Tunisia	PAOK Sports Arena, Thessaloniki; Referees: Cacador, Nicolau (POR)
28 July 2011; 18:00	Wiesmach 9	(20–13)	Toumi 5	PAOK Sports Arena, Thessaloniki; Referees: Cacador, Nicolau (POR)
28 July 2011; 18:00	2× (yellow card) 2× (suspension) 1× (red card)	Report	3× (yellow card) 4× (suspension) 1× (red card)	PAOK Sports Arena, Thessaloniki; Referees: Cacador, Nicolau (POR)

28 July 2011; 20:30	Egypt	24 – 25	Germany	PAOK Sports Arena, Thessaloniki; Referees: Mošorinski, Pandžić (SRB)
28 July 2011; 20:30	Ahmed Abdel 6	(11–14)	Dissinger 6	PAOK Sports Arena, Thessaloniki; Referees: Mošorinski, Pandžić (SRB)
28 July 2011; 20:30	2× (yellow card) 3× (suspension) 1× (red card)	Report	3× (yellow card) 6× (suspension)	PAOK Sports Arena, Thessaloniki; Referees: Mošorinski, Pandžić (SRB)

==== Third place game ====
30 July 2011; 18:00	Tunisia	24 – 18	Egypt	PAOK Sports Arena, Thessaloniki; Referees: Volodkov, Zotin (RUS)
30 July 2011; 18:00	Sanai 8	(14–8)	Sanad 6	PAOK Sports Arena, Thessaloniki; Referees: Volodkov, Zotin (RUS)
30 July 2011; 18:00	3× (yellow card) 2× (suspension)	Report	3× (yellow card) 2× (suspension)	PAOK Sports Arena, Thessaloniki; Referees: Volodkov, Zotin (RUS)

==== Final ====
30 July 2011; 20:30	Denmark	18 – 27	Germany	PAOK Sports Arena, Thessaloniki; Referees: Al-Marxzouqi, Al-Nuaimi (UAE)
30 July 2011; 20:30	Saad 5	(10–13)	Sellin 7	PAOK Sports Arena, Thessaloniki; Referees: Al-Marxzouqi, Al-Nuaimi (UAE)
30 July 2011; 20:30	3× (yellow card) 4× (suspension)	Report	3× (yellow card) 3× (suspension)	PAOK Sports Arena, Thessaloniki; Referees: Al-Marxzouqi, Al-Nuaimi (UAE)

=== 5–8th place play-offs ===
Semifinals
27 July
Sweden	26
Spain	28
27 July
Slovenia	29
France	30

Fifth place
28 July
Spain	29
France	28
Seventh place
28 July
Sweden	27
Slovenia	24

==== Semifinals ====
27 July 2011; 18:00	Sweden	26 – 28	Spain	PAOK Sports Arena, Thessaloniki; Referees: Krichen, Makhlouf (TUN)
27 July 2011; 18:00	Nilsson 9	(12–9)	Alonso 6	PAOK Sports Arena, Thessaloniki; Referees: Krichen, Makhlouf (TUN)
27 July 2011; 18:00	3× (yellow card) 4× (suspension)	Report	3× (yellow card) 5× (suspension)	PAOK Sports Arena, Thessaloniki; Referees: Krichen, Makhlouf (TUN)

27 July 2011; 20:30	Slovenia	29 – 30	France	PAOK Sports Arena, Thessaloniki; Referees: Opava, Valke (CZE)
27 July 2011; 20:30	Marguč 7	(16–16)	Mahé 9	PAOK Sports Arena, Thessaloniki; Referees: Opava, Valke (CZE)
27 July 2011; 20:30	2× (yellow card) 6× (suspension)	Report	3× (yellow card) 3× (suspension)	PAOK Sports Arena, Thessaloniki; Referees: Opava, Valke (CZE)

==== Seventh place game ====
28 July 2011; 16:00	Sweden	27 – 24	Slovenia	YMCA indoor hall, Thessaloniki; Referees: Al Mutawa, Al Suwailem (KUW)
28 July 2011; 16:00	Lonn, Cederholm 6	(12–9)	Marguč 5	YMCA indoor hall, Thessaloniki; Referees: Al Mutawa, Al Suwailem (KUW)
28 July 2011; 16:00	3× (yellow card) 5× (suspension)	Report	3× (yellow card) 5× (suspension)	YMCA indoor hall, Thessaloniki; Referees: Al Mutawa, Al Suwailem (KUW)

==== Fifth place game ====
28 July 2011; 18:00	Spain	29 – 28	France	YMCA indoor hall, Thessaloniki; Referees: Pavićević, Ražnatović (MNE)
28 July 2011; 18:00	Alonso 8	(15–11)	Grébille 6	YMCA indoor hall, Thessaloniki; Referees: Pavićević, Ražnatović (MNE)
28 July 2011; 18:00	3× (yellow card) 2× (suspension)	Report	3× (yellow card) 5× (suspension)	YMCA indoor hall, Thessaloniki; Referees: Pavićević, Ražnatović (MNE)

=== 9th–16th place playoffs ===
Quarterfinals
Norway	41
Russia	40
Greece	20
Brazil	23
Portugal	39
Qatar	29
Algeria	28
Iran	36

Semifinals
Norway	34
Brazil	29
Portugal	37
Iran	33

Ninth place
Norway	37
Portugal	41
Eleventh place
Brazil	22
Iran	21

13–16th place bracket

Semifinals
27 July
Russia	32
Greece	22
27 July
Qatar	21
Algeria	22

13th place
28 July
Algeria	24
Russia	28
Third place
28 July
Qatar	31
Greece	23

==== Quarterfinals ====
25 July 2011; 13:00	Norway	41 – 40	Russia	YMCA indoor hall, Thessaloniki; Referees: Al Mutawa, Al Suwailem (KUW)
25 July 2011; 13:00	Kristensen 8	(20–14)	Bespalov, Parshutin 7	YMCA indoor hall, Thessaloniki; Referees: Al Mutawa, Al Suwailem (KUW)
25 July 2011; 13:00	3× (yellow card) 3× (suspension)	Report	2× (yellow card) 5× (suspension)	YMCA indoor hall, Thessaloniki; Referees: Al Mutawa, Al Suwailem (KUW)

25 July 2011; 15:30	Algeria	28 – 36	Iran	YMCA indoor hall, Thessaloniki; Referees: Horváth, Márton (HUN)
25 July 2011; 15:30	Hamoud 9	(12–19)	Esteki 16	YMCA indoor hall, Thessaloniki; Referees: Horváth, Márton (HUN)
25 July 2011; 15:30	2× (yellow card) 5× (suspension)	Report	2× (yellow card) 4× (suspension)	YMCA indoor hall, Thessaloniki; Referees: Horváth, Márton (HUN)

25 July 2011; 18:00	Portugal	39 – 29	Qatar	YMCA indoor hall, Thessaloniki; Referees: Wyss, Zowa (SUI)
25 July 2011; 18:00	Ferraz 9	(19–12)	Hamdoon 7	YMCA indoor hall, Thessaloniki; Referees: Wyss, Zowa (SUI)
25 July 2011; 18:00	2× (yellow card) 7× (suspension)	Report	2× (yellow card) 3× (suspension) 1× (red card)	YMCA indoor hall, Thessaloniki; Referees: Wyss, Zowa (SUI)

25 July 2011; 20:30	Greece	20 – 23	Brazil	YMCA indoor hall, Thessaloniki; Referees: Krichen, Makhlouf (TUN)
25 July 2011; 20:30	Koutsikopoulos 4	(11–13)	Campos 5	YMCA indoor hall, Thessaloniki; Referees: Krichen, Makhlouf (TUN)
25 July 2011; 20:30	3× (yellow card) 4× (suspension)	Report	2× (yellow card) 2× (suspension)	YMCA indoor hall, Thessaloniki; Referees: Krichen, Makhlouf (TUN)

==== 13th–16th place Semifinals ====
27 July 2011; 16:00	Qatar	21 – 22	Algeria	YMCA indoor hall, Thessaloniki; Referees: Cvetko, Kavalar (SLO)
27 July 2011; 16:00	three players 4	(12–11)	Zamoun, Hamoud 5	YMCA indoor hall, Thessaloniki; Referees: Cvetko, Kavalar (SLO)
27 July 2011; 16:00	3× (yellow card) 3× (suspension)	Report	3× (yellow card) 2× (suspension) 1× (red card)	YMCA indoor hall, Thessaloniki; Referees: Cvetko, Kavalar (SLO)

27 July 2011; 20:30	Russia	32 – 22	Greece	YMCA indoor hall, Thessaloniki; Referees: Mousavian, Taghavi (IRI)
27 July 2011; 20:30	Zhedik 9	(17–12)	Koutsikopoulos 5	YMCA indoor hall, Thessaloniki; Referees: Mousavian, Taghavi (IRI)
27 July 2011; 20:30	3× (yellow card) 2× (suspension)	Report	3× (yellow card) 4× (suspension)	YMCA indoor hall, Thessaloniki; Referees: Mousavian, Taghavi (IRI)

==== 9th–12th place Semifinals ====
27 July 2011; 15:30	Portugal	37 – 33	Iran	PAOK Sports Arena, Thessaloniki; Referees: Bethmann, Tzaferopoulos (GRE)
27 July 2011; 15:30	Duarte 8	(12–17)	Esteki 12	PAOK Sports Arena, Thessaloniki; Referees: Bethmann, Tzaferopoulos (GRE)
27 July 2011; 15:30	3× (yellow card) 6× (suspension)	Report	3× (yellow card) 11× (suspension)	PAOK Sports Arena, Thessaloniki; Referees: Bethmann, Tzaferopoulos (GRE)

27 July 2011; 18:00	Norway	34 – 29	Brazil	YMCA indoor hall, Thessaloniki; Referees: Gousko, Repkin (BLR)
27 July 2011; 18:00	three players 5	(15–14)	Perrella 12	YMCA indoor hall, Thessaloniki; Referees: Gousko, Repkin (BLR)
27 July 2011; 18:00	2× (yellow card) 2× (suspension)	Report	3× (yellow card) 3× (suspension)	YMCA indoor hall, Thessaloniki; Referees: Gousko, Repkin (BLR)

==== Fifteenth place game ====
28 July 2011; 15:30	Greece	23 – 31	Qatar	PAOK Sports Arena, Thessaloniki; Referees: Gousko, Repkin (BLR)
28 July 2011; 15:30	Tziras, Kandilas 4	(14–14)	Al-Karbi 7	PAOK Sports Arena, Thessaloniki; Referees: Gousko, Repkin (BLR)
28 July 2011; 15:30	2× (yellow card) 2× (suspension)	Report	3× (yellow card) 1× (suspension)	PAOK Sports Arena, Thessaloniki; Referees: Gousko, Repkin (BLR)

==== Thirteenth place game ====
28 July 2011; 14:00	Russia	28 – 24	Algeria	YMCA indoor hall, Thessaloniki; Referees: Leszczynski, Piechota (POL)
28 July 2011; 14:00	Zhedik 6	(13–9)	Zamoum 7	YMCA indoor hall, Thessaloniki; Referees: Leszczynski, Piechota (POL)
28 July 2011; 14:00	3× (yellow card) 2× (suspension)	Report	3× (yellow card) 2× (suspension)	YMCA indoor hall, Thessaloniki; Referees: Leszczynski, Piechota (POL)

==== Eleventh place game ====
28 July 2011; 13:30	Brazil	22 – 21	Iran	PAOK Sports Arenahall, Thessaloniki; Referees: Abdelaziz, Rashed (EGY)
28 July 2011; 13:30	three players 4	(13–9)	Esteki 7	PAOK Sports Arenahall, Thessaloniki; Referees: Abdelaziz, Rashed (EGY)
28 July 2011; 13:30	3× (yellow card) 2× (suspension)	Report	3× (yellow card) 2× (suspension)	PAOK Sports Arenahall, Thessaloniki; Referees: Abdelaziz, Rashed (EGY)

==== Ninth place game ====
28 July 2011; 12:00	Norway	37 – 41	Portugal	YMCA indoor hall, Thessaloniki; Referees: Wyss, Zowa (SUI)
28 July 2011; 12:00	Tønnesen 8	(13–19)	Duarte 7	YMCA indoor hall, Thessaloniki; Referees: Wyss, Zowa (SUI)
28 July 2011; 12:00	3× (yellow card) 4× (suspension)	Report	2× (yellow card) 3× (suspension)	YMCA indoor hall, Thessaloniki; Referees: Wyss, Zowa (SUI)

=== 17–20th place play-offs ===
Semifinals
24 July
Serbia	32
Argentina	27
24 July
South Korea	31
Hungary	34

Seventeenth place
25 July
Serbia	35
Hungary	36
Nineteenth place
25 July
Argentina	31
South Korea	41

==== Semifinals ====
24 July 2011; 18:00	Serbia	32 – 27	Argentina	Evosmos Sports Hall, Thessaloniki; Referees: Gousko, Repkin (BLR)
24 July 2011; 18:00	Jokić 13	(19–14)	Filipuzzi, Cánepa 6	Evosmos Sports Hall, Thessaloniki; Referees: Gousko, Repkin (BLR)
24 July 2011; 18:00	2× (yellow card) 6× (suspension)	Report	3× (yellow card) 4× (suspension)	Evosmos Sports Hall, Thessaloniki; Referees: Gousko, Repkin (BLR)

24 July 2011; 20:00	South Korea	31 – 34	Hungary	Evosmos Sports Hall, Thessaloniki; Referees: Mousavian, Taghavi (IRI)
24 July 2011; 20:00	Jung Jin-ho 7	(13–18)	Ancsin, Pásztor 6	Evosmos Sports Hall, Thessaloniki; Referees: Mousavian, Taghavi (IRI)
24 July 2011; 20:00	3× (yellow card) 2× (suspension)	Report	2× (yellow card) 9× (suspension)	Evosmos Sports Hall, Thessaloniki; Referees: Mousavian, Taghavi (IRI)

==== Nineteenth place game ====
25 July 2011; 18:00	Argentina	31 – 41	South Korea	PAOK Sports Arena, Thessaloniki; Referees: Mousavian, Taghavi (IRN)
25 July 2011; 18:00	Pizarro, Cánepa 10	(15–22)	Jung Jin-ho 9	PAOK Sports Arena, Thessaloniki; Referees: Mousavian, Taghavi (IRN)
25 July 2011; 18:00	3× (yellow card) 6× (suspension)	Report	3× (yellow card) 4× (suspension)	PAOK Sports Arena, Thessaloniki; Referees: Mousavian, Taghavi (IRN)

==== Seventeenth place game ====
25 July 2011; 20:00	Serbia	35 – 36	Hungary	PAOK Sports Arena, Thessaloniki; Referees: Abdelaziz, Rashed (EGY)
25 July 2011; 20:00	Nenadić 9	(14–18)	three players 6	PAOK Sports Arena, Thessaloniki; Referees: Abdelaziz, Rashed (EGY)
25 July 2011; 20:00	3× (yellow card) 2× (suspension)	Report	3× (yellow card) 4× (suspension)	PAOK Sports Arena, Thessaloniki; Referees: Abdelaziz, Rashed (EGY)

=== 21–24th place play-offs ===
Semifinals
24 July
Chile	28
Venezuela	24
24 July
Benin	22
Canada	23

21st place
25 July
Chile	27
Canada	26
23rd place
25 July
Venezuela	18
Benin	28

==== Semifinals ====
24 July 2011; 14:00	Chile	28 – 24	Venezuela	Evosmos Sports Hall, Thessaloniki; Referees: Al Mutawa, Al Suwailem (KUW)
24 July 2011; 14:00	Feuchtmann 7	(13–10)	Silva 6	Evosmos Sports Hall, Thessaloniki; Referees: Al Mutawa, Al Suwailem (KUW)
24 July 2011; 14:00	2× (yellow card) 5× (suspension)	Report	2× (yellow card) 3× (suspension)	Evosmos Sports Hall, Thessaloniki; Referees: Al Mutawa, Al Suwailem (KUW)

24 July 2011; 16:00	Benin	22 – 23	Canada	Evosmos Sports Hall, Thessaloniki; Referees: Pavićević, Ražnatović (MNE)
24 July 2011; 16:00	Quenum 8	(12–12)	Bilton 5	Evosmos Sports Hall, Thessaloniki; Referees: Pavićević, Ražnatović (MNE)
24 July 2011; 16:00	3× (yellow card) 3× (suspension)	Report	3× (yellow card) 2× (suspension) 1× (red card)	Evosmos Sports Hall, Thessaloniki; Referees: Pavićević, Ražnatović (MNE)

==== 21st place game ====
25 July 2011; 14:00	Chile	27 – 26	Canada	PAOK Sports Arena, Thessaloniki; Referees: Cvetko, Kavalar (SLO)
25 July 2011; 14:00	Feuchtmann 10	(11–10)	Kuby 5	PAOK Sports Arena, Thessaloniki; Referees: Cvetko, Kavalar (SLO)
25 July 2011; 14:00	3× (yellow card) 2× (suspension)	Report	3× (yellow card) 1× (suspension)	PAOK Sports Arena, Thessaloniki; Referees: Cvetko, Kavalar (SLO)

==== 23rd place game ====
25 July 2011; 16:00	Venezuela	18 – 28	Benin	PAOK Sports Arena, Thessaloniki; Referees: Al-Nuaimi, Al-Marxzouqi (UAE)
25 July 2011; 16:00	Contreras 5	(7–12)	Sina 11	PAOK Sports Arena, Thessaloniki; Referees: Al-Nuaimi, Al-Marxzouqi (UAE)
25 July 2011; 16:00	3× (yellow card) 3× (suspension)	Report	3× (yellow card) 3× (suspension)	PAOK Sports Arena, Thessaloniki; Referees: Al-Nuaimi, Al-Marxzouqi (UAE)

== Final standings ==
Rank	Team
Gold medal	Germany
Silver medal	Denmark
Bronze medal	Tunisia
4	Egypt
5	Spain
6	France
7	Sweden
8	Slovenia
9	Portugal
10	Norway
11	Brazil
12	Iran
13	Russia
14	Algeria
15	Qatar
16	Greece
17	Hungary
18	Serbia
19	South Korea
20	Argentina
21	Chile
22	Canada
23	Benin
24	Venezuela

== All-star team ==
- Goalkeeper: Nils Dresrüsse (GER)
- Left wing: Oussama Boughanmi (TUN)
- Left back: Christian Dissinger (GER)
- Pivot: Andreas Nilsson (SWE)
- Centre back: Mads Mensah Larsen (DEN)
- Right back: Andrey Bespalon (RUS)
- Right wing: Patrick Wiesmach Larsen (DEN)

== Top scorers ==
Top scorers
Rank	Player	Team	Goals	Shots	%	Games	Mean
1	Sajjad Esteki	Iran	91	181	50.3 %	9	10,1
2	Iman Jamali	Iran	80	144	55.6 %	9	8,9
3	Sergey Zhedik	Russia	58	78	74.4 %	9	6,4
4	Patrick Wiesmach	Denmark	53	62	85.5 %	9	5,9
5	Kent Robin Tønnesen	Norway	53	94	56.4 %	9	5,9
6	Raul Campos	Brazil	52	101	51.5 %	9	5,8
7	Kentin Mahé	France	50	85	58.8 %	9	5,6
8	João Ferraz	Portugal	50	95	52.6 %	9	5,6
9	Erwin Feuchtmann	Chile	50	101	49.5 %	7	7,1
10	Gašper Marguč	Slovenia	48	65	73.8 %	9	5,3
