= 2009 Men's Youth World Handball Championship =

2009 Youth World Championship

Tournament details
- Host country: Tunisia
- Venues: 3 (in 3 host cities)
- Dates: July 20–31
- Teams: 20 (from 4 confederations)

Final positions
- Champions: Croatia (1st title)
- Runners-up: Iceland
- Third place: Sweden
- Fourth place: Tunisia

Tournament statistics
- Matches played: 64
- Goals scored: 3,649 (57.02 per match)
- Top scorer: (Iran) Sajjad Esteki (65)

Awards
- Best player: (Tunisia) Mohamed Sfar

The 2009 Men's Youth World Handball Championship (3rd tournament) took place in Tunisia from July 20–July 31.

Croatia is the 2009 Men’s Youth World Champion, after beating Iceland in the final with 40:35.

== Venues ==
Tunis	Nabeul
El Menzah Sports Palace	Salle Bir Challouf
Capacity: 5,500	Capacity: 5,000
Hammamet	2009 Men's Youth World Handball Championship is located in Tunisia
Hall 7th Novembre	2009 Men's Youth World Handball Championship is located in Tunisia
Capacity: 2,500	2009 Men's Youth World Handball Championship is located in Tunisia

== Preliminary round ==
=== Group A ===
Team	Pld	W	D	L	GF	GA	GD	Pts
Norway	4	4	0	0	139	95	+44	8
Germany	4	3	0	1	126	90	+36	6
Egypt	4	2	0	2	132	107	+25	4
Qatar	4	1	0	3	109	115	−6	2
Morocco	4	0	0	4	56	155	−99	0

July 20; 17:00	Egypt	31 – 36	Norway	El Menzah Sports Palace, Tunis; Referees: Pandžić, Šatordžija (BIH)
July 20; 17:00	Ismail 10	(13–18)	Merg 10	El Menzah Sports Palace, Tunis; Referees: Pandžić, Šatordžija (BIH)
July 20; 17:00	2× (yellow card) 8× (suspension) 2× (red card)	Report	3× (yellow card) 5× (suspension)	El Menzah Sports Palace, Tunis; Referees: Pandžić, Šatordžija (BIH)

July 20; 21:00	Qatar	41 – 15	Morocco	El Menzah Sports Palace, Tunis; Referees: Da Costa, Da Costa (BRA)
July 20; 21:00	Murad, Al-Karbi 7	(20–7)	Baddi 4	El Menzah Sports Palace, Tunis; Referees: Da Costa, Da Costa (BRA)
July 20; 21:00	2× (yellow card) 5× (suspension) 1× (red card)	Report	2× (yellow card) 8× (suspension)	El Menzah Sports Palace, Tunis; Referees: Da Costa, Da Costa (BRA)

July 21; 17:00	Germany	26 – 30	Norway	El Menzah Sports Palace, Tunis; Referees: Badura, Ondogrecula (SVK)
July 21; 17:00	König 9	(15–16)	Stroemberg 8	El Menzah Sports Palace, Tunis; Referees: Badura, Ondogrecula (SVK)
July 21; 17:00	2× (yellow card) 2× (suspension)	Report	3× (yellow card) 8× (suspension)	El Menzah Sports Palace, Tunis; Referees: Badura, Ondogrecula (SVK)

July 21; 21:00	Morocco	17 – 38	Egypt	El Menzah Sports Palace, Tunis; Referees: Li, Wang (CHN)
July 21; 21:00	Nadli, El-Fargi, Minitel 3	(8–17)	Sanad 8	El Menzah Sports Palace, Tunis; Referees: Li, Wang (CHN)
July 21; 21:00	2× (yellow card) 5× (suspension)	Report	3× (yellow card) 5× (suspension)	El Menzah Sports Palace, Tunis; Referees: Li, Wang (CHN)

July 22; 19:00	Qatar	18 – 32	Germany	El Menzah Sports Palace, Tunis; Referees: Da Costa, Da Costa (BRA)
July 22; 19:00	Salem, Morgan 4	(8–18)	Geppert 8	El Menzah Sports Palace, Tunis; Referees: Da Costa, Da Costa (BRA)
July 22; 19:00	3× (yellow card) 1× (suspension) 3× (red card)	Report	3× (yellow card) 2× (suspension)	El Menzah Sports Palace, Tunis; Referees: Da Costa, Da Costa (BRA)

July 23; 17:00	Egypt	34 – 23	Qatar	El Menzah Sports Palace, Tunis; Referees: Badura, Ondogrecula (SVK)
July 23; 17:00	El-Bohy 8	(15–6)	Murad 7	El Menzah Sports Palace, Tunis; Referees: Badura, Ondogrecula (SVK)
July 23; 17:00	3× (yellow card) 4× (suspension)	Report	3× (yellow card) 7× (suspension)	El Menzah Sports Palace, Tunis; Referees: Badura, Ondogrecula (SVK)

July 23; 21:00	Norway	39 – 11	Morocco	El Menzah Sports Palace, Tunis; Referees: Al-Mawlani, Al-Mizili (BHR)
July 23; 21:00	Søndenaa 9	(15–6)	Minitel 3	El Menzah Sports Palace, Tunis; Referees: Al-Mawlani, Al-Mizili (BHR)
July 23; 21:00	3× (yellow card) 4× (suspension)	Report	3× (yellow card) 3× (suspension)	El Menzah Sports Palace, Tunis; Referees: Al-Mawlani, Al-Mizili (BHR)

July 24; 19:30	Morocco	13 – 37	Germany	El Menzah Sports Palace, Tunis; Referees: Birch, Stenrand (DEN)
July 24; 19:30	Harchaoui 5	(4–18)	Hornke 8	El Menzah Sports Palace, Tunis; Referees: Birch, Stenrand (DEN)
July 24; 19:30	3× (yellow card) 2× (suspension)	Report	3× (yellow card) 1× (suspension)	El Menzah Sports Palace, Tunis; Referees: Birch, Stenrand (DEN)

July 25; 17:00	Germany	31 – 29	Egypt	El Menzah Sports Palace, Tunis; Referees: Badura, Ondogrecula (SVK)
July 25; 17:00	König 9	(12–16)	Ismail 10	El Menzah Sports Palace, Tunis; Referees: Badura, Ondogrecula (SVK)
July 25; 17:00	3× (yellow card) 4× (suspension)	Report	2× (yellow card) 7× (suspension)	El Menzah Sports Palace, Tunis; Referees: Badura, Ondogrecula (SVK)

July 25; 21:00	Norway	34 – 27	Qatar	El Menzah Sports Palace, Tunis; Referees: Krichen, Makhlouf (TUN)
July 25; 21:00	Havang 9	(15–13)	Salem 7	El Menzah Sports Palace, Tunis; Referees: Krichen, Makhlouf (TUN)
July 25; 21:00	3× (yellow card) 2× (suspension) 1× (red card)	Report	3× (yellow card) 2× (suspension)	El Menzah Sports Palace, Tunis; Referees: Krichen, Makhlouf (TUN)

=== Group B ===
Team	Pld	W	D	L	GF	GA	GD	Pts
Sweden	4	4	0	0	149	105	+44	8
Iceland	4	3	0	1	142	122	+20	6
France	4	2	0	2	113	98	+15	4
Brazil	4	1	0	3	119	126	−7	2
Puerto Rico	4	0	0	4	78	150	−72	0

July 20; 19:00	Iceland	35 – 23	Puerto Rico	Salle Bir Challouf, Nabeul; Referees: Achifon, Nyoth (CMR)
July 20; 19:00	G. Ólafsson 7	(16–11)	F. Pérez 6	Salle Bir Challouf, Nabeul; Referees: Achifon, Nyoth (CMR)
July 20; 19:00	3× (yellow card) 8× (suspension)	Report	2× (yellow card) 5× (suspension)	Salle Bir Challouf, Nabeul; Referees: Achifon, Nyoth (CMR)

July 20; 21:00	Brazil	26 – 33	France	Salle Bir Challouf, Nabeul; Referees: Al-Suwaidi, Bamatraf (QAT)
July 20; 21:00	Constantino 7	(14–17)	Moreau 7	Salle Bir Challouf, Nabeul; Referees: Al-Suwaidi, Bamatraf (QAT)
July 20; 21:00	2× (yellow card) 1× (suspension) 1× (red card)	Report	3× (yellow card) 5× (suspension)	Salle Bir Challouf, Nabeul; Referees: Al-Suwaidi, Bamatraf (QAT)

July 21; 19:00	Sweden	49 – 12	Puerto Rico	Salle Bir Challouf, Nabeul; Referees: El-Sayed, Zidan (EGY)
July 21; 19:00	Ganibegović, Zachrisson 8	(20–4)	F. Pérez 3	Salle Bir Challouf, Nabeul; Referees: El-Sayed, Zidan (EGY)
July 21; 19:00	3× (yellow card) 3× (suspension)	Report	3× (yellow card) 2× (suspension) 1× (red card)	Salle Bir Challouf, Nabeul; Referees: El-Sayed, Zidan (EGY)

July 21; 21:00	France	24 – 29	Iceland	Salle Bir Challouf, Nabeul; Referees: Nachevski, Nikolov (MKD)
July 21; 21:00	Joli 5	(14–14)	G. Ólafsson 9	Salle Bir Challouf, Nabeul; Referees: Nachevski, Nikolov (MKD)
July 21; 21:00	3× (yellow card) 3× (suspension)	Report	3× (yellow card) 4× (suspension)	Salle Bir Challouf, Nabeul; Referees: Nachevski, Nikolov (MKD)

July 22; 21:00	Brazil	27 – 30	Sweden	Salle Bir Challouf, Nabeul; Referees: Cvetko, Kavalar (SLO)
July 22; 21:00	Campos 15	(16–15)	Ottosson 10	Salle Bir Challouf, Nabeul; Referees: Cvetko, Kavalar (SLO)
July 22; 21:00	3× (yellow card) 1× (suspension)	Report	3× (yellow card) 3× (suspension) 1× (red card)	Salle Bir Challouf, Nabeul; Referees: Cvetko, Kavalar (SLO)

July 23; 19:00	Iceland	37 – 31	Brazil	Salle Bir Challouf, Nabeul; Referees: Erdoğan, Özdeniz (TUR)
July 23; 19:00	Jóhannsson 9	(19–15)	Perrella 8	Salle Bir Challouf, Nabeul; Referees: Erdoğan, Özdeniz (TUR)
July 23; 19:00	1× (yellow card) 5× (suspension)	Report	3× (yellow card) 3× (suspension)	Salle Bir Challouf, Nabeul; Referees: Erdoğan, Özdeniz (TUR)

July 23; 21:00	Puerto Rico	17 – 31	France	Salle Bir Challouf, Nabeul; Referees: Nachevski, Nikolov (MKD)
July 23; 21:00	Hiraldo 7	(9–13)	Moreau 7	Salle Bir Challouf, Nabeul; Referees: Nachevski, Nikolov (MKD)
July 23; 21:00	3× (yellow card) 4× (suspension)	Report	3× (yellow card) 4× (suspension) 1× (red card)	Salle Bir Challouf, Nabeul; Referees: Nachevski, Nikolov (MKD)

July 24; 21:00	France	25 – 26	Sweden	Salle Bir Challouf, Nabeul; Referees: Al-Suwaidi, Bamatraf (QAT)
July 24; 21:00	Moreau 6	(15–12)	Zachrisson 7	Salle Bir Challouf, Nabeul; Referees: Al-Suwaidi, Bamatraf (QAT)
July 24; 21:00	3× (yellow card) 4× (suspension)	Report	2× (yellow card) 3× (suspension)	Salle Bir Challouf, Nabeul; Referees: Al-Suwaidi, Bamatraf (QAT)

July 25; 19:00	Sweden	44 – 41	Iceland	Salle Bir Challouf, Nabeul; Referees: Wyss, Zowa (SUI)
July 25; 19:00	Zachrisson 13	(22–20)	Jóhannsson 10	Salle Bir Challouf, Nabeul; Referees: Wyss, Zowa (SUI)
July 25; 19:00	2× (yellow card) 4× (suspension)	Report	3× (yellow card) 5× (suspension)	Salle Bir Challouf, Nabeul; Referees: Wyss, Zowa (SUI)

July 25; 21:00	Puerto Rico	26 – 35	Brazil	Salle Bir Challouf, Nabeul; Referees: Achifon, Nyoth (CMR)
July 25; 21:00	Kirkland, Hiraldo, F. Pérez, Mercado 5	(10–15)	Perrella, Y. Silva, Riccini 6	Salle Bir Challouf, Nabeul; Referees: Achifon, Nyoth (CMR)
July 25; 21:00	1× (yellow card) 2× (suspension) 1× (red card)	Report	2× (yellow card) 6× (suspension) 1× (red card)	Salle Bir Challouf, Nabeul; Referees: Achifon, Nyoth (CMR)

=== Group C ===
Team	Pld	W	D	L	GF	GA	GD	Pts
Tunisia	4	4	0	0	121	97	+24	8
Denmark	4	3	0	1	116	100	+16	6
Iran	4	1	1	2	127	131	−4	3 (Note: Tiebreaker: 1 PT / 0 GD)
Algeria	4	1	1	2	98	107	−9	3
Kuwait	4	0	0	4	109	136	−27	0

Notes:

July 20; 19:00	Kuwait	32 – 37	Iran	Hall 7th Novembre, Hammamet; Referees: Wyss, Zowa (SUI)
July 20; 19:00	S. Ali 8	(16–16)	Esteki 13	Hall 7th Novembre, Hammamet; Referees: Wyss, Zowa (SUI)
July 20; 19:00	1× (yellow card) 7× (suspension)	Report	3× (yellow card) 7× (suspension)	Hall 7th Novembre, Hammamet; Referees: Wyss, Zowa (SUI)

July 20; 21:00	Tunisia	26 – 14	Algeria	Hall 7th Novembre, Hammamet; Referees: Cvetko, Kavalar (SLO)
July 20; 21:00	Toumi, Bannour 5	(11–7)	Rahim 3	Hall 7th Novembre, Hammamet; Referees: Cvetko, Kavalar (SLO)
July 20; 21:00	3× (yellow card) 4× (suspension)	Report	3× (yellow card) 7× (suspension) 1× (red card)	Hall 7th Novembre, Hammamet; Referees: Cvetko, Kavalar (SLO)

July 21; 19:00	Denmark	23 – 19	Algeria	Hall 7th Novembre, Hammamet; Referees: Erdoğan, Özdeniz (TUR)
July 21; 19:00	Bramming 7	(8–7)	Rahim 7	Hall 7th Novembre, Hammamet; Referees: Erdoğan, Özdeniz (TUR)
July 21; 19:00	3× (yellow card) 2× (suspension)	Report	3× (yellow card) 4× (suspension)	Hall 7th Novembre, Hammamet; Referees: Erdoğan, Özdeniz (TUR)

July 21; 21:00	Iran	30 – 35	Tunisia	Hall 7th Novembre, Hammamet; Referees: Al-Suwaidi, Bamatraf (QAT)
July 21; 21:00	Esteki 10	(18–15)	Boughanmi 9	Hall 7th Novembre, Hammamet; Referees: Al-Suwaidi, Bamatraf (QAT)
July 21; 21:00	3× (yellow card) 4× (suspension) 1× (red card)	Report	2× (yellow card) 3× (suspension)	Hall 7th Novembre, Hammamet; Referees: Al-Suwaidi, Bamatraf (QAT)

July 22; 21:00	Kuwait	23 – 32	Denmark	Hall 7th Novembre, Hammamet; Referees: Achifon, Nyoth (CMR)
July 22; 21:00	Al-Mutairi 5	(9–17)	Bramming 7	Hall 7th Novembre, Hammamet; Referees: Achifon, Nyoth (CMR)
July 22; 21:00	3× (yellow card) 5× (suspension) 1× (red card)	Report	2× (yellow card) 6× (suspension)	Hall 7th Novembre, Hammamet; Referees: Achifon, Nyoth (CMR)

July 23; 19:00	Tunisia	32 – 26	Kuwait	Hall 7th Novembre, Hammamet; Referees: Wyss, Zowa (SUI)
July 23; 19:00	Yahiaoui 9	(17–13)	Al-Dousrey 9	Hall 7th Novembre, Hammamet; Referees: Wyss, Zowa (SUI)
July 23; 19:00	2× (yellow card) 4× (suspension)	Report	2× (yellow card) 2× (suspension)	Hall 7th Novembre, Hammamet; Referees: Wyss, Zowa (SUI)

July 23; 21:00	Algeria	30 – 30	Iran	Hall 7th Novembre, Hammamet; Referees: El-Sayed, Zidan (EGY)
July 23; 21:00	Hadjsadok 9	(12–13)	Esteki 9	Hall 7th Novembre, Hammamet; Referees: El-Sayed, Zidan (EGY)
July 23; 21:00	3× (yellow card) 3× (suspension)	Report	3× (yellow card) 2× (suspension)	Hall 7th Novembre, Hammamet; Referees: El-Sayed, Zidan (EGY)

July 24; 21:00	Iran	30 – 34	Denmark	Hall 7th Novembre, Hammamet; Referees: Cvetko, Kavalar (SLO)
July 24; 21:00	Esteki 10	(16–13)	Wiesmach, Møller 7	Hall 7th Novembre, Hammamet; Referees: Cvetko, Kavalar (SLO)
July 24; 21:00	3× (yellow card) 5× (suspension)	Report	3× (yellow card) 3× (suspension)	Hall 7th Novembre, Hammamet; Referees: Cvetko, Kavalar (SLO)

July 25; 19:00	Algeria	35 – 28	Kuwait	Hall 7th Novembre, Hammamet; Referees: Erdoğan, Özdeniz (TUR)
July 25; 19:00	Rahim 8	(17–10)	Al-Haidari 6	Hall 7th Novembre, Hammamet; Referees: Erdoğan, Özdeniz (TUR)
July 25; 19:00	3× (yellow card) 10× (suspension) 1× (red card)	Report	3× (yellow card) 8× (suspension) 1× (red card)	Hall 7th Novembre, Hammamet; Referees: Erdoğan, Özdeniz (TUR)

July 25; 21:00	Denmark	27 – 28	Tunisia	Hall 7th Novembre, Hammamet; Referees: Nachevski, Nikolov (MKD)
July 25; 21:00	Saad 5	(12–14)	Boughanmi 12	Hall 7th Novembre, Hammamet; Referees: Nachevski, Nikolov (MKD)
July 25; 21:00	3× (yellow card) 2× (suspension)	Report	3× (yellow card) 4× (suspension) 1× (red card)	Hall 7th Novembre, Hammamet; Referees: Nachevski, Nikolov (MKD)

=== Group D ===
Team	Pld	W	D	L	GF	GA	GD	Pts
Croatia	4	4	0	0	147	84	+63	8
Spain	4	3	0	1	120	57	+63	6
Argentina	4	2	0	2	100	114	−14	4
Libya	4	1	0	3	89	129	−40	2
Venezuela	4	0	0	4	81	153	−72	0

July 20; 15:00	Croatia	24 – 20	Spain	El Menzah Sports Palace, Tunis; Referees: Krichen, Makhlouf (TUN)
July 20; 15:00	Markotić 7	(11–11)	Miralles 8	El Menzah Sports Palace, Tunis; Referees: Krichen, Makhlouf (TUN)
July 20; 15:00	3× (yellow card) 7× (suspension)	Report	2× (yellow card) 2× (suspension)	El Menzah Sports Palace, Tunis; Referees: Krichen, Makhlouf (TUN)

July 20; 19:00	Libya	38 – 29	Venezuela	El Menzah Sports Palace, Tunis; Referees: Li, Wang (CHN)
July 20; 19:00	Dabaa 12	(18–11)	Soto 7	El Menzah Sports Palace, Tunis; Referees: Li, Wang (CHN)
July 20; 19:00	1× (yellow card) 3× (suspension)	Report	3× (yellow card) 4× (suspension)	El Menzah Sports Palace, Tunis; Referees: Li, Wang (CHN)

July 21; 15:00	Argentina	8 – 28	Spain	El Menzah Sports Palace, Tunis; Referees: Birch, Stenrand (DEN)
July 21; 15:00	Cantore 3	(5–10)	Miralles, Paraja 5	El Menzah Sports Palace, Tunis; Referees: Birch, Stenrand (DEN)
July 21; 15:00	3× (yellow card) 9× (suspension) 2× (red card)	Report	3× (yellow card) 3× (suspension)	El Menzah Sports Palace, Tunis; Referees: Birch, Stenrand (DEN)

July 21; 19:00	Venezuela	17 – 38	Croatia	El Menzah Sports Palace, Tunis; Referees: Al-Mawlani, Al-Mizili (BHR)
July 21; 19:00	Silva, Escobar 4	(9–16)	Stepančič 8	El Menzah Sports Palace, Tunis; Referees: Al-Mawlani, Al-Mizili (BHR)
July 21; 19:00	3× (yellow card) 3× (suspension)	Report	3× (yellow card) 2× (suspension)	El Menzah Sports Palace, Tunis; Referees: Al-Mawlani, Al-Mizili (BHR)

July 22; 21:00	Libya	20 – 28	Argentina	El Menzah Sports Palace, Tunis; Referees: Pandžić, Šatordžija (BIH)
July 22; 21:00	Eisa 8	(11–13)	Cantore 7	El Menzah Sports Palace, Tunis; Referees: Pandžić, Šatordžija (BIH)
July 22; 21:00	3× (yellow card) 5× (suspension)	Report	3× (yellow card) 7× (suspension)	El Menzah Sports Palace, Tunis; Referees: Pandžić, Šatordžija (BIH)

July 23; 15:00	Croatia	42 – 18	Libya	El Menzah Sports Palace, Tunis; Referees: Krichen, Makhlouf (TUN)
July 23; 15:00	Ledinski 7	(22–6)	El-Mahreg, Eisa 6	El Menzah Sports Palace, Tunis; Referees: Krichen, Makhlouf (TUN)
July 23; 15:00	3× (yellow card) 8× (suspension)	Report	3× (yellow card) 4× (suspension)	El Menzah Sports Palace, Tunis; Referees: Krichen, Makhlouf (TUN)

July 23; 19:00	Spain	42 – 12	Venezuela	El Menzah Sports Palace, Tunis; Referees: Da Costa, Da Costa (BRA)
July 23; 19:00	F. García 8	(19–5)	Silva 3	El Menzah Sports Palace, Tunis; Referees: Da Costa, Da Costa (BRA)
July 23; 19:00	2× (yellow card) 1× (suspension)	Report	3× (yellow card) 3× (suspension) 1× (red card)	El Menzah Sports Palace, Tunis; Referees: Da Costa, Da Costa (BRA)

July 24; 21:00	Venezuela	23 – 35	Argentina	El Menzah Sports Palace, Tunis; Referees: Li, Wang (CHN)
July 24; 21:00	Salcedo 6	(11–18)	Pizarro 7	El Menzah Sports Palace, Tunis; Referees: Li, Wang (CHN)
July 24; 21:00	2× (yellow card) 4× (suspension)	Report	3× (yellow card) 3× (suspension)	El Menzah Sports Palace, Tunis; Referees: Li, Wang (CHN)

July 25; 15:00	Argentina	29 – 43	Croatia	El Menzah Sports Palace, Tunis; Referees: Birch, Stenrand (DEN)
July 25; 15:00	Cantore 11	(14–19)	Hud 11	El Menzah Sports Palace, Tunis; Referees: Birch, Stenrand (DEN)
July 25; 15:00	3× (yellow card) 7× (suspension) 1× (red card)	Report	3× (yellow card) 5× (suspension)	El Menzah Sports Palace, Tunis; Referees: Birch, Stenrand (DEN)

July 25; 19:00	Spain	30 – 13	Libya	El Menzah Sports Palace, Tunis; Referees: Al-Mawlani, Al-Mizili (BHR)
July 25; 19:00	Cabanas 5	(15–5)	Eisa 6	El Menzah Sports Palace, Tunis; Referees: Al-Mawlani, Al-Mizili (BHR)
July 25; 19:00	3× (yellow card) 7× (suspension)	Report	3× (yellow card) 3× (suspension)	El Menzah Sports Palace, Tunis; Referees: Al-Mawlani, Al-Mizili (BHR)

== Placement matches ==
=== 17th–20th ===
Semifinal 17th–20th
July 27 – Tunis
Morocco	33
Puerto Rico (ET)	34
July 27 – Tunis
Kuwait	31
Venezuela	34

17th place
July 29 – Tunis
Puerto Rico	31
Venezuela	25
19th place
July 29 – Tunis
Morocco	22
Kuwait	31

July 27
16:00
Morocco
33 – 34 (ET)
Puerto Rico
Hall 7th Novembre, Nabeul
Referees: Al-Suwaidi, Bamatraf (QAT)
Harchaoui 10
(10–15)
Hiraldo 11
3× (yellow card) 5× (suspension)
Report
3× (yellow card) 6× (suspension) 1× (red card)

FT: 27–27 ET: 6–7

July 27; 16:00	Kuwait	31 – 34	Venezuela	Hall 7th Novembre, Hammamet; Referees: Nachevski, Nikolov (MKD)
July 27; 16:00	Al-Gharaballi 10	(12–15)	Contreras 8	Hall 7th Novembre, Hammamet; Referees: Nachevski, Nikolov (MKD)
July 27; 16:00	3× (yellow card) 7× (suspension)	Report	3× (yellow card) 2× (suspension)	Hall 7th Novembre, Hammamet; Referees: Nachevski, Nikolov (MKD)

==== 19th/20th ====
July 29; 11:00	Morocco	22 – 31	Kuwait	El Menzah Sports Palace, Tunis; Referees: Krichen, Makhlouf (TUN)
July 29; 11:00	Harchaoui 6	(8–14)	Saif, Al-Hajeri, Al-Haidari 6	El Menzah Sports Palace, Tunis; Referees: Krichen, Makhlouf (TUN)
July 29; 11:00	3× (yellow card) 6× (suspension) 1× (red card)	Report	3× (yellow card) 8× (suspension)	El Menzah Sports Palace, Tunis; Referees: Krichen, Makhlouf (TUN)

==== 17th/18th ====
July 29; 13:30	Puerto Rico	31 – 25	Venezuela	El Menzah Sports Palace, Tunis; Referees: Li, Wang (CHN)
July 29; 13:30	Hiraldo 8	(14–11)	Salcedo 6	El Menzah Sports Palace, Tunis; Referees: Li, Wang (CHN)
July 29; 13:30	3× (yellow card) 4× (suspension)	Report	3× (yellow card) 1× (suspension)	El Menzah Sports Palace, Tunis; Referees: Li, Wang (CHN)

=== 13th–16th ===
Semifinal 13th–16th
July 27 – Tunis
Qatar	33
Brazil	29
July 27 – Tunis
Algeria	31
Libya	19

13th place
July 29 – Tunis
Qatar	27
Algeria	26
15th place
July 29 – Tunis
Brazil	34
Libya	15

July 27; 13:30	Qatar	33 – 29	Brazil	El Menzah Sports Palace, Tunis; Referees: Al-Mawlani, Al-Mizili (BHR)
July 27; 13:30	Al-Bishi, Murad, Morgan 7	(13–15)	Rossoni 7	El Menzah Sports Palace, Tunis; Referees: Al-Mawlani, Al-Mizili (BHR)
July 27; 13:30	2× (yellow card) 3× (suspension)	Report	3× (yellow card) 2× (suspension)	El Menzah Sports Palace, Tunis; Referees: Al-Mawlani, Al-Mizili (BHR)

July 27; 18:30	Algeria	31 – 19	Libya	Hall 7th Novembre, Nabeul; Referees: Achifon, Nyoth (CMR)
July 27; 18:30	Hamoud, Zamoum 7	(16–11)	Eisa, Esertawi 7	Hall 7th Novembre, Nabeul; Referees: Achifon, Nyoth (CMR)
July 27; 18:30	3× (yellow card) 3× (suspension) 3× (red card)	Report	2× (yellow card) 4× (suspension) 1× (red card)	Hall 7th Novembre, Nabeul; Referees: Achifon, Nyoth (CMR)

==== 15th/16th ====
July 29; 16:00	Brazil	34 – 15	Libya	El Menzah Sports Palace, Tunis; Referees: Al-Mawlani, Al-Mizili (BHR)
July 29; 16:00	Perrella, Riccini 7	(17–7)	Dabaa 6	El Menzah Sports Palace, Tunis; Referees: Al-Mawlani, Al-Mizili (BHR)
July 29; 16:00	3× (yellow card) 2× (suspension)	Report	3× (yellow card) 3× (suspension)	El Menzah Sports Palace, Tunis; Referees: Al-Mawlani, Al-Mizili (BHR)

==== 13th/14th ====
July 29; 18:30	Qatar	27 – 26	Algeria	El Menzah Sports Palace, Tunis; Referees: Da Costa, Da Costa (BRA)
July 29; 18:30	Sinen 9	(14–10)	Rahim 7	El Menzah Sports Palace, Tunis; Referees: Da Costa, Da Costa (BRA)
July 29; 18:30	2× (yellow card) 3× (suspension)	Report	3× (yellow card) 5× (suspension)	El Menzah Sports Palace, Tunis; Referees: Da Costa, Da Costa (BRA)

=== 9th–12th ===
Semifinal 9th–12th
July 27 – Tunis
Egypt	27
France	33
July 27 – Tunis
Iran	30
Argentina	26

9th place
July 29 – Tunis
France	35
Iran	27
11th place
July 29 – Tunis
Egypt	29
Argentina	32

July 27; 16:00	Egypt	27 – 33	France	El Menzah Sports Palace, Tunis; Referees: Pandžić, Šatordžija (BIH)
July 27; 16:00	El-Bohy 8	(13–15)	Capella 7	El Menzah Sports Palace, Tunis; Referees: Pandžić, Šatordžija (BIH)
July 27; 16:00	3× (yellow card) 1× (suspension)	Report	3× (yellow card) 7× (suspension)	El Menzah Sports Palace, Tunis; Referees: Pandžić, Šatordžija (BIH)

July 27; 18:30	Iran	30 – 26	Argentina	Hall 7th Novembre, Hammamet; Referees: Wyss, Zowa (SUI)
July 27; 18:30	Esteki 11	(14–10)	Cantore, Cánepa 7	Hall 7th Novembre, Hammamet; Referees: Wyss, Zowa (SUI)
July 27; 18:30	3× (yellow card) 4× (suspension)	Report	3× (yellow card) 1× (suspension)	Hall 7th Novembre, Hammamet; Referees: Wyss, Zowa (SUI)

==== 11th/12th ====
July 29; 21:00	Egypt	29 – 32	Argentina	El Menzah Sports Palace, Tunis; Referees: Birch, Stenrand (DEN)
July 29; 21:00	Nawar 9	(19–16)	Cantore 9	El Menzah Sports Palace, Tunis; Referees: Birch, Stenrand (DEN)
July 29; 21:00	3× (yellow card) 5× (suspension)	Report	3× (yellow card) 7× (suspension) 1× (red card)	El Menzah Sports Palace, Tunis; Referees: Birch, Stenrand (DEN)

==== 9th/10th ====
July 29; 16:00	France	35 – 27	Iran	Hall 7th Novembre, Hammamet; Referees: Erdoğan, Özdeniz (TUR)
July 29; 16:00	Joli 9	(17–14)	Esteki 12	Hall 7th Novembre, Hammamet; Referees: Erdoğan, Özdeniz (TUR)
July 29; 16:00	3× (yellow card) 1× (suspension)	Report	3× (yellow card) 2× (suspension)	Hall 7th Novembre, Hammamet; Referees: Erdoğan, Özdeniz (TUR)

== Final round ==
Quarterfinal
July 27 – Tunis
Norway	37
Iceland	43
July 27 – Tunis
Spain	19
Tunisia	26
July 27 – Tunis
Sweden	31
Germany	26
July 27 – Tunis
Denmark	24
Croatia	29

Semifinal
July 29 – Tunis
Iceland	33
Tunisia	31
July 29 – Tunis
Sweden	25
Croatia	28

Final
July 31 – Tunis
Iceland	35
Croatia	40
Third place
July 31 – Tunis
Tunisia	27
Sweden	30

Semifinal 5th–8th
July 29 – Tunis
Norway	21
Spain	23
July 29 – Tunis
Germany	22
Denmark	31

5th place
July 31 – Tunis
Spain	29
Denmark	30
7th place
July 31 – Tunis
Norway	24
Germany	25

=== Quarterfinals ===
July 27; 18:30	Norway	37 – 43	Iceland	El Menzah Sports Palace, Tunis; Referees: Birch, Stenrand (DEN)
July 27; 18:30	Hippe 8	(21–20)	Pálmarsson 11	El Menzah Sports Palace, Tunis; Referees: Birch, Stenrand (DEN)
July 27; 18:30	3× (yellow card) 3× (suspension)	Report	3× (yellow card) 2× (suspension)	El Menzah Sports Palace, Tunis; Referees: Birch, Stenrand (DEN)

July 27; 21:00	Spain	19 – 26	Tunisia	Hall 7th Novembre, Hammamet; Referees: Cvetko, Kavalar (SLO)
July 27; 21:00	F. García 4	(11–13)	Jallouz 5	Hall 7th Novembre, Hammamet; Referees: Cvetko, Kavalar (SLO)
July 27; 21:00	3× (yellow card) 3× (suspension)	Report	3× (yellow card) 5× (suspension)	Hall 7th Novembre, Hammamet; Referees: Cvetko, Kavalar (SLO)

July 27; 21:00	Sweden	31 – 26	Germany	El Menzah Sports Palace, Tunis; Referees: Krichen, Makhlouf (TUN)
July 27; 21:00	Ottosson 7	(14–12)	Geppert, König 4	El Menzah Sports Palace, Tunis; Referees: Krichen, Makhlouf (TUN)
July 27; 21:00	3× (yellow card) 4× (suspension)	Report	3× (yellow card) 4× (suspension)	El Menzah Sports Palace, Tunis; Referees: Krichen, Makhlouf (TUN)

July 27; 21:00	Denmark	24 – 29	Croatia	Hall 7th Novembre, Nabeul; Referees: El-Sayed, Zidan (EGY)
July 27; 21:00	Bramming 5	(13–15)	Markotić 8	Hall 7th Novembre, Nabeul; Referees: El-Sayed, Zidan (EGY)
July 27; 21:00	3× (yellow card) 2× (suspension)	Report	3× (yellow card) 6× (suspension)	Hall 7th Novembre, Nabeul; Referees: El-Sayed, Zidan (EGY)

=== 5th–8th ===
July 29; 18:30	Norway	21 – 23	Spain	Hall 7th Novembre, Hammamet; Referees: Al-Suwaidi, Bamatraf (QAT)
July 29; 18:30	Sørheim, Benevoli 4	(8–13)	Miralles, Humet 4	Hall 7th Novembre, Hammamet; Referees: Al-Suwaidi, Bamatraf (QAT)
July 29; 18:30	2× (yellow card) 3× (suspension)	Report	3× (yellow card) 4× (suspension)	Hall 7th Novembre, Hammamet; Referees: Al-Suwaidi, Bamatraf (QAT)

July 29; 18:30	Germany	22 – 31	Denmark	Hall 7th Novembre, Nabeul; Referees: Cvetko, Kavalar (SLO)
July 29; 18:30	Schubert 5	(14–14)	Wiesmach 7	Hall 7th Novembre, Nabeul; Referees: Cvetko, Kavalar (SLO)
July 29; 18:30	3× (yellow card)	Report	3× (yellow card) 2× (suspension)	Hall 7th Novembre, Nabeul; Referees: Cvetko, Kavalar (SLO)

=== Semifinals ===
July 29; 21:00	Iceland	33 – 31	Tunisia	Hall 7th Novembre, Hammamet; Referees: Nachevski, Nikolov (MKD)
July 29; 21:00	Guðmundsson 10	(14–15)	Bannour 8	Hall 7th Novembre, Hammamet; Referees: Nachevski, Nikolov (MKD)
July 29; 21:00	3× (yellow card) 3× (suspension)	Report	3× (yellow card) 4× (suspension)	Hall 7th Novembre, Hammamet; Referees: Nachevski, Nikolov (MKD)

July 29; 21:00	Sweden	25 – 28	Croatia	Hall 7th Novembre, Nabeul; Referees: Badura, Ondogrecula (SVK)
July 29; 21:00	Zachrisson, Arrman 4	(11–17)	Marić 8	Hall 7th Novembre, Nabeul; Referees: Badura, Ondogrecula (SVK)
July 29; 21:00	2× (yellow card) 4× (suspension)	Report	3× (yellow card) 7× (suspension)	Hall 7th Novembre, Nabeul; Referees: Badura, Ondogrecula (SVK)

=== 7th/8th ===
July 31; 15:00	Norway	24 – 25	Germany	Hall 7th Novembre, Nabeul; Referees: El-Sayed, Zidan (EGY)
July 31; 15:00	Sørheim 5	(11–10)	Hornke 5	Hall 7th Novembre, Nabeul; Referees: El-Sayed, Zidan (EGY)
July 31; 15:00	3× (yellow card) 3× (suspension)	Report	3× (yellow card) 3× (suspension)	Hall 7th Novembre, Nabeul; Referees: El-Sayed, Zidan (EGY)

=== 5th/6th ===
July 31; 17:30	Spain	29 – 30	Denmark	Hall 7th Novembre, Nabeul; Referees: Wyss, Zowa (SUI)
July 31; 17:30	Guedea 6	(14–18)	Bramming 7	Hall 7th Novembre, Nabeul; Referees: Wyss, Zowa (SUI)
July 31; 17:30	2× (yellow card) 1× (suspension)	Report	2× (yellow card) 2× (suspension)	Hall 7th Novembre, Nabeul; Referees: Wyss, Zowa (SUI)

=== Bronze medal match ===
July 31; 18:30	Tunisia	27 – 30	Sweden	Hall 7th Novembre, Hammamet; Referees: Al-Suwaidi, Bamatraf (QAT)
July 31; 18:30	Boughanmi 10	(15–16)	Zachrisson 13	Hall 7th Novembre, Hammamet; Referees: Al-Suwaidi, Bamatraf (QAT)
July 31; 18:30	3× (yellow card) 3× (suspension) 1× (red card)	Report	3× (yellow card) 1× (suspension) 1× (red card)	Hall 7th Novembre, Hammamet; Referees: Al-Suwaidi, Bamatraf (QAT)

=== Gold medal match ===
July 31; 20:30	Iceland	35 – 40	Croatia	Hall 7th Novembre, Hammamet; Referees: Krichen, Makhlouf (TUN)
July 31; 20:30	Guðmundsson 8	(15–19)	Marić 9	Hall 7th Novembre, Hammamet; Referees: Krichen, Makhlouf (TUN)
July 31; 20:30	3× (yellow card) 5× (suspension)	Report	3× (yellow card) 4× (suspension) 1× (red card)	Hall 7th Novembre, Hammamet; Referees: Krichen, Makhlouf (TUN)

== Final standings ==
Rank	Team
Gold medal	Croatia
Silver medal	Iceland
Bronze medal	Sweden
4	Tunisia
5	Denmark
6	Spain
7	Germany
8	Norway
9	France
10	Iran
11	Argentina
12	Egypt
13	Qatar
14	Algeria
15	Brazil
16	Libya
17	Puerto Rico
18	Venezuela
19	Kuwait
20	Morocco

== All-star team ==
During the victory ceremony the best actors of the tournament were announced. The following players earned a nomination to the tournament's All-Star Team:

- Goalkeeper: Mohamed Sfar (TUN)
- Left wing: Ossama Boughanmi (TUN)
- Left back: Ólafur Guðmundsson (ISL)
- Pivot: Marino Marić (CRO)
- Centre back: Vedran Huđ (CRO)
- Right back: Aron Pálmarsson (ISL)
- Right wing: Mattias Zachrisson (SWE)
