= Christian Dissinger =

German handball player (born 1991)

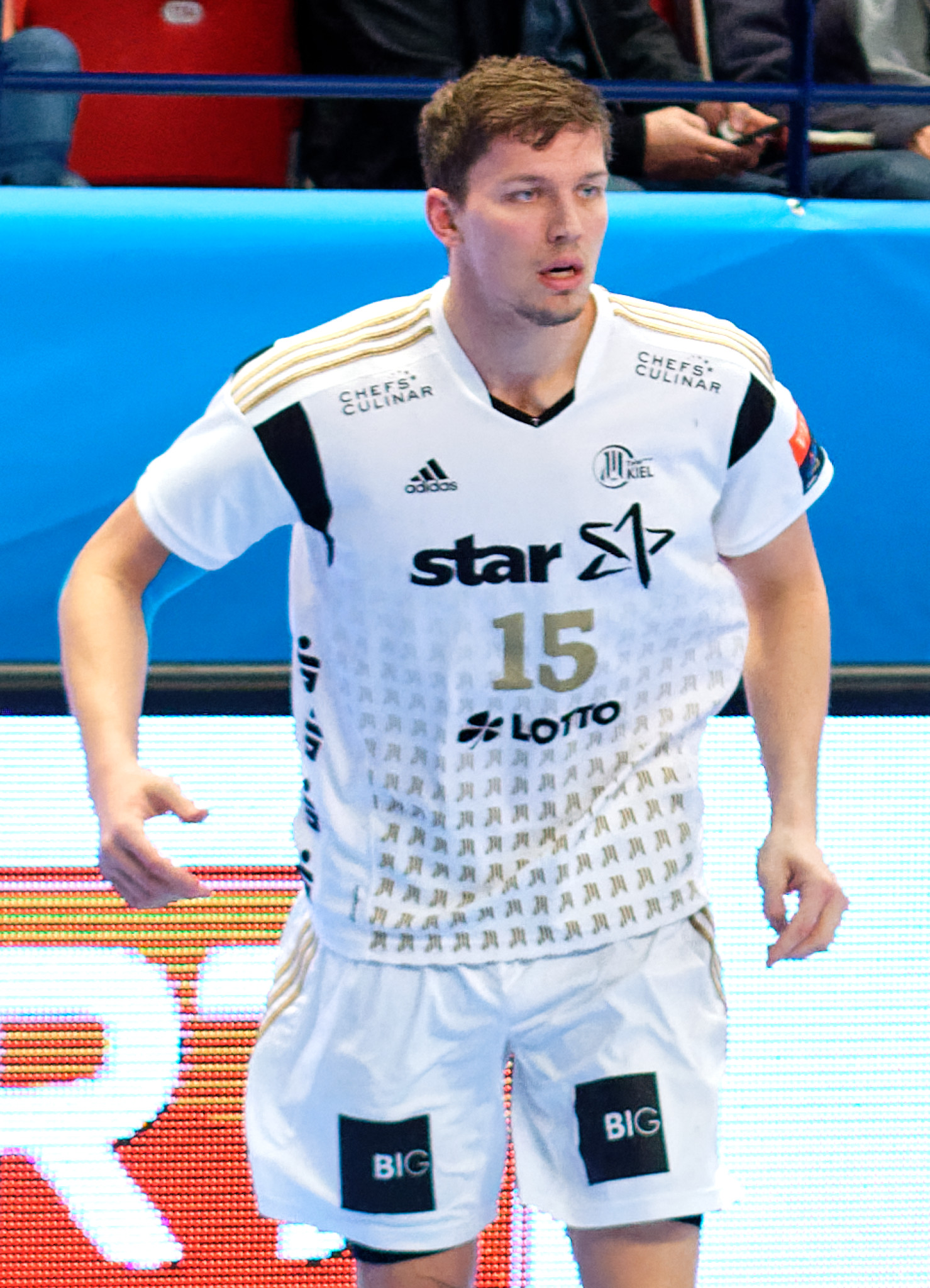
- Dissinger in 2017

Personal information
- Nationality: German
- Born: 15 November 1991 (age 34) Ludwigshafen, Germany
- Height: 2.03 m (6 ft 8 in)

Sport
- Sport: Handball
- Position: Left back
- Current club: Kazma SC

Youth career
- Years: Team
- 1997–2009: TSG Friesenheim

Senior clubs
- Years: Team
- 2008–2011: TSG Friesenheim
- 2011–2013: Kadetten Schaffhausen
- 2013: BM Atlético Madrid
- 2014–2015: TuS N-Lübbecke
- 2015–2018: THW Kiel
- 2018–2021: RK Vardar 1961
- 2021–03/2023: Dinamo București
- 03/2023–06/2023: Al Duhail
- 10/2023–12/2023: PLER-Budapest
- 01/2024–2025: MOL Tatabánya KC
- 11/2025–2026: Győri ETO-UNI FKC
- 2026–: Kazma SC
National team
Years	Team	Apps	(Gls)
2013–	Germany	19	(42)
Medal record
Olympic Games
Bronze medal – third place	2016 Rio de Janeiro	Team
European Championship
Gold medal – first place	2016 Poland
Junior World Championship
Gold medal – first place	2011 Greece

Christian Alexander Dissinger (born 15 November 1991) is a German professional handball player who plays as a left back for Kuwaiti club Kazma SC. He represented the Germany national team, winning the 2016 European Championship and a bronze medal at the 2016 Summer Olympics. At club level, he won the 2018–19 EHF Champions League with Vardar.

== Club career ==
Dissinger started his career at the German club TSG Friesenheim and played there until June 2011. After TSG Friesenheim was relegated he changed to the Swiss club Kadetten Schaffhausen. In March 2013, he gave his debut for Germany men's national handball team. In the Summer 2013 he moved to the Spanish club Atlético Madrid BM which announced their departure from Handball competitions in July 2013. After a long recovery from his second cross ligament rupture (May 2013) he came back for his new club TuS Nettelstedt-Lübbecke in April 2014. In the summer of 2015, he signed a contract for THW Kiel. He extended his contract in January 2016 until June 2020. In October 2018, Dissinger's contract was dissolved on mutual consent; later on he signed a contract with RK Vardar.

After leaving Vardar in 2021, Dissinger joined Dinamo București. He later played for Al-Duhail, PLER-Budapest, Tatabánya KC and Győri ETO-UNI FKC. In 2026, Dissinger moved to Kuwaiti club Kazma SC.

== International career ==
Dissinger won the 2011 Men's Junior World Handball Championship with Germany. He was named the tournament's most valuable player and best left back by the International Handball Federation.

He later represented the senior German national team. He was part of the German squad that won the 2016 European Men's Handball Championship and subsequently won bronze at the 2016 Summer Olympics in Rio de Janeiro.

== Achievements ==
=== Domestic competitions ===
- Macedonian Handball Super League:

Winner: 2018-19, 2020-21

- Macedonian Handball Cup:

Winner: 2020-21

- DHB-Pokal:

Winner: 2017

- DHB-Supercup:

Winner: 2015

- Swiss Handball League:

Winner: 2011-12

- Liga Națională:

Winner: 2021-22

- Romanian Cup:

Winner: 2021-22

- Qatar Handball League:

Winner: 2022-23

=== European competitions ===
- EHF Champions League:

Winner: 2018–19

=== Other competitions ===
- SEHA League:

Winner: 2018–19

=== International ===
- Summer Olympics:
  - Bronze: 2016
- European Championship:
  - Gold: 2016
- World Junior Championship:
  - Gold: 2011
