= Justine Wadsack =

American politician

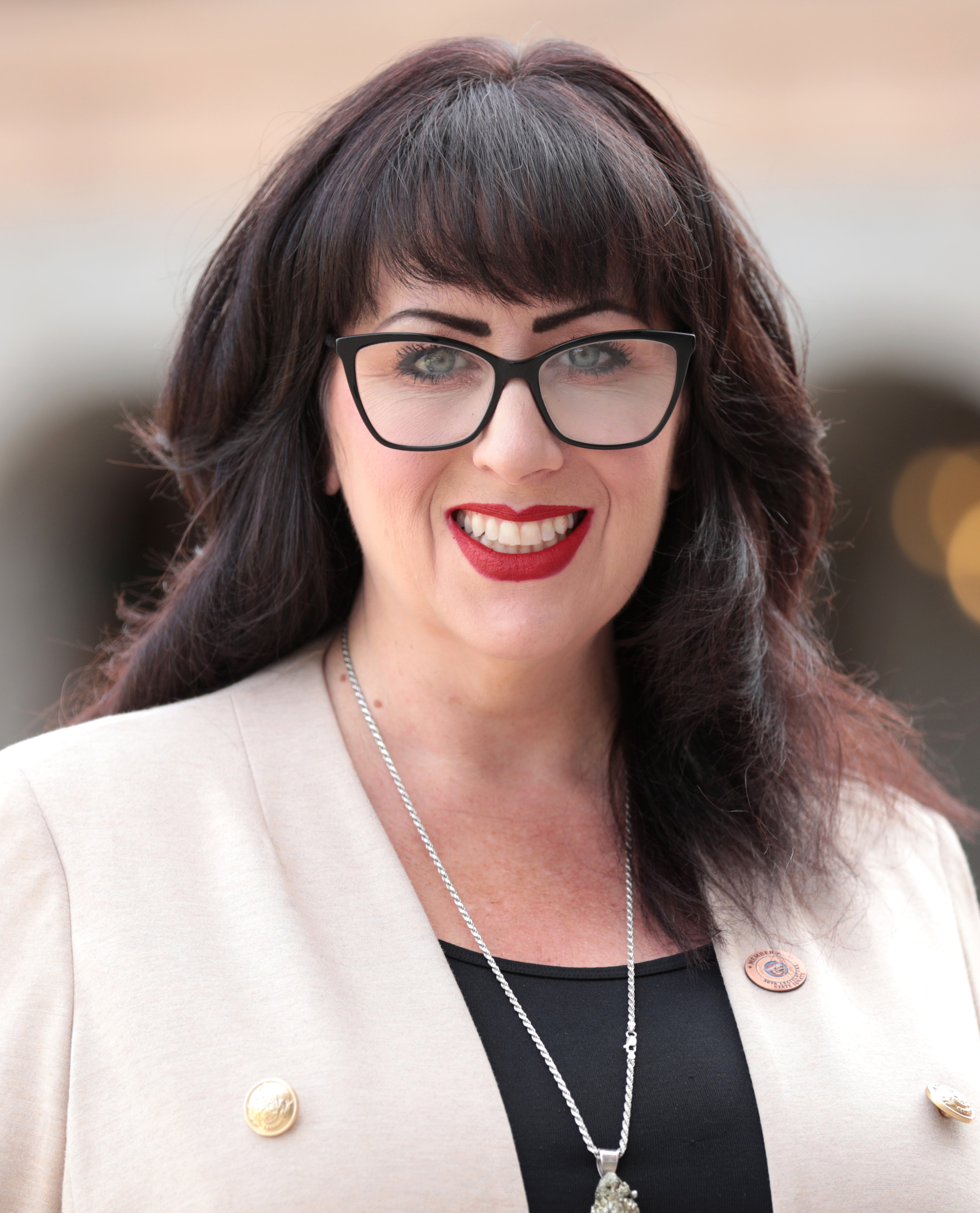
- Wadsack in 2023

Member of the Arizona Senate from the 17th district
- In office January 9, 2023 – January 13, 2025
- Preceded by: J. D. Mesnard
- Succeeded by: Vince Leach

Personal details
- Party: Republican

Justine Wadsack is an American politician and former member of the Arizona Senate. Wadsack was elected in 2022 to represent District 17 as a member of the Republican Party. Wadsack defeated incumbent State Senator Vince Leach in the 2022 Republican primary. In July 2024, Leach defeated Wadsack in the 2024 Republican primary.

== Political career ==
=== 2020 campaigns ===
Before running for office, Wadsack was a real estate agent and political activist. She first filed to run for office in 2019, and in 2020 unsuccessfully sought election to the U.S. Congress and Arizona State Senate. In 2020, Wadsack posted a QAnon conspiracy theory slogan and QAnon hashtags on social media. She told The Arizona Republic in September 2022 that she was unaware at the time of what QAnon claims involved, and later realized it was "crap."

=== 2022 campaign ===
In 2022, Wadsack ran for Arizona state senate as a Trump-aligned candidate supported by the Arizona Tea Party and "Purple for Parents" (a group formed to oppose the Arizona "Red for Ed" movement). She ran in the newly created Legislative District 17, which covers most of Tucson's northwest and far east sides, as well as Rita Ranch.

In the August 2022 Republican primary election, Wadsack defeated incumbent Vince Leach, the senate president pro tempore. Wadsack took 41% of the vote, Leach took 35%, and Robert Barr took 24%. Supporters of Leach and other candidates sued to block Wadsack from the ballot, arguing that Wadsack did not live in LD 17 and was thus ineligible to be a candidate. Wadsack jointly owns a home in midtown Tucson (outside LD 17) in a trust with her husband; she testified that she moved into the home of a supporter in LD 17 in February 2022 after separating from her husband, but acknowledged that she continued to list the midtown Tucson address as her current residence after that time.

In a hearing in Pima County Superior Court, Wadsack claimed in testimony that she had moved to the home of a campaign donor after being repeatedly attacked by "antifa"; Tucson Police Department reports did not support this claim, making no mention of any "political or organized" attack on Wadsack's property. The Tucson police records did reflect that Wadsack had been taunted by one Texas man who was charged with misdemeanor hate crime and disorderly conduct. Wadsack later said that the police reports had missed some incidents. A state judge rejected the effort to remove Wadsack from the ballot, saying that the circumstances were "suspicious" but that the petitioners had not proven by "clear and convincing evidence" that she was not an LD 17 resident at the time of the primary.

In the November 2022 general election, Wadsack narrowly defeated Democratic nominee Mike Nickerson, a retired pastor. Wadsack won 63,501 votes to Nickerson's 60,420 votes.

=== Tenure in state Senate ===
Wadsack is aligned with the far-right Arizona Freedom Caucus group of legislative Republicans. During Governor Katie Hobbs' State of the State address in January 2023, Wadsack and fellow Republican Anthony Kern stood and turned their backs to the governor, while four Republican representatives walked out mid-speech. After the speech, Hobbs said that it was "unfortunate that some members chose an immature stunt instead, but we have really tough issues in front of us and we need to work together to stop them."

In March 2023, Wadsack and other Freedom Caucus members denounced proposals to adopt ranked-choice voting in Arizona and sponsored legislation to preemptively ban it in the state. She attracted attention for introducing legislation (SB 1700) to give parents the power to ask schools to ban books they deem inappropriate. The legislation passed the Senate on a party-line vote in March 2023.

Wadsack introduced a bill to amend the Arizona Constitution to end city charters in Arizona. The bill would have stripped 19 Arizona municipalities of their home rule rights, but was targeted at the City of Tucson. Wadsack objected to Tucson's "modified ward" system for electing City Council members. Tucson's mayor criticized the bill for infringing on local control. Wadsack's bill was defeated after two Republican senators representing Districts with charter cities joined with Democrats to vote against it.

Wadsack claimed that the State Bar of Arizona had threatened lawyers with disbarment if they represented litigants challenging COVID-19-related mandates and restrictions. The bar said that Wadsack's claims were false, and Wadsack refused to offer any evidence in support of her claims. Several Republican lawyers who had taken cases challenging COVID-19-related mandates said that Wadsack's claims were untrue. Nevertheless, Wadsack introduced legislation (SB 1435) that would shift attorney-licensing responsibilities from the bar to the Arizona Supreme Court.

Wadsack is vice chair of the Education Committee. In 2023, she introduced legislation (SB 1402) that would open the Arizona School for the Deaf and Blind (ASDB) to students with all disabilities. Wadsack contended that the School's residential campus in Tucson was underused and that its mission should be expanded to accommodate other special needs students. The proposal prompted an outcry from blind and deaf students, as well as their parents and advocates. They said Wadsack's proposal would reduce capacity for students with visual and auditory impairments and fundamentally alter the school's curriculum, which is geared toward instruction in Braille and American sign language. Wadsack rejected these criticisms, but withdrew her bill in favor of a measure to create an ad hoc committee to study schools. She supported an amendment to reauthorize ASDB for two years, rather than the more typical eight years.

In March 2023, a recall-petition campaign seeking to recall Wadsack from office was launched. The effort failed to obtain sufficient signatures to trigger a recall election.

==== Arrest ====
In March 2024, Wadsack was pulled over by Tucson Police for driving 71 mph in a 35 mph zone. Wadsack was not cited at that time due to legislative immunity, which prevents lawmakers from getting arrested while the legislature is in session. Wadsack refused to sign a citation after the legislative session ended, accusing the police of "political persecution". In response to her comments, the Arizona Fraternal Order of Police retracted their endorsement of Wadsack in the 2024 Republican primary race.

In July 2024, Wadsack was formally charged for the March 2024 speeding incident, including a charge for failure to provide proof of insurance. Wadsack is set to appear in Tucson City Court on August 21, 2024 and faces up to 30 days in jail, a $500 fine and one year of probation.

=== 2024 campaign ===
In 2024, Wadsack ran for reelection to the Arizona state senate from Legislative District 17. In the July 2024 Republican primary election, Wadsack was defeated by former-Senator Vince Leach, whom she had defeated in the 2022 primary. In the November 2024 general election, Leach will face Democratic nominee John McLean.
