= Vince Leach =

American politician

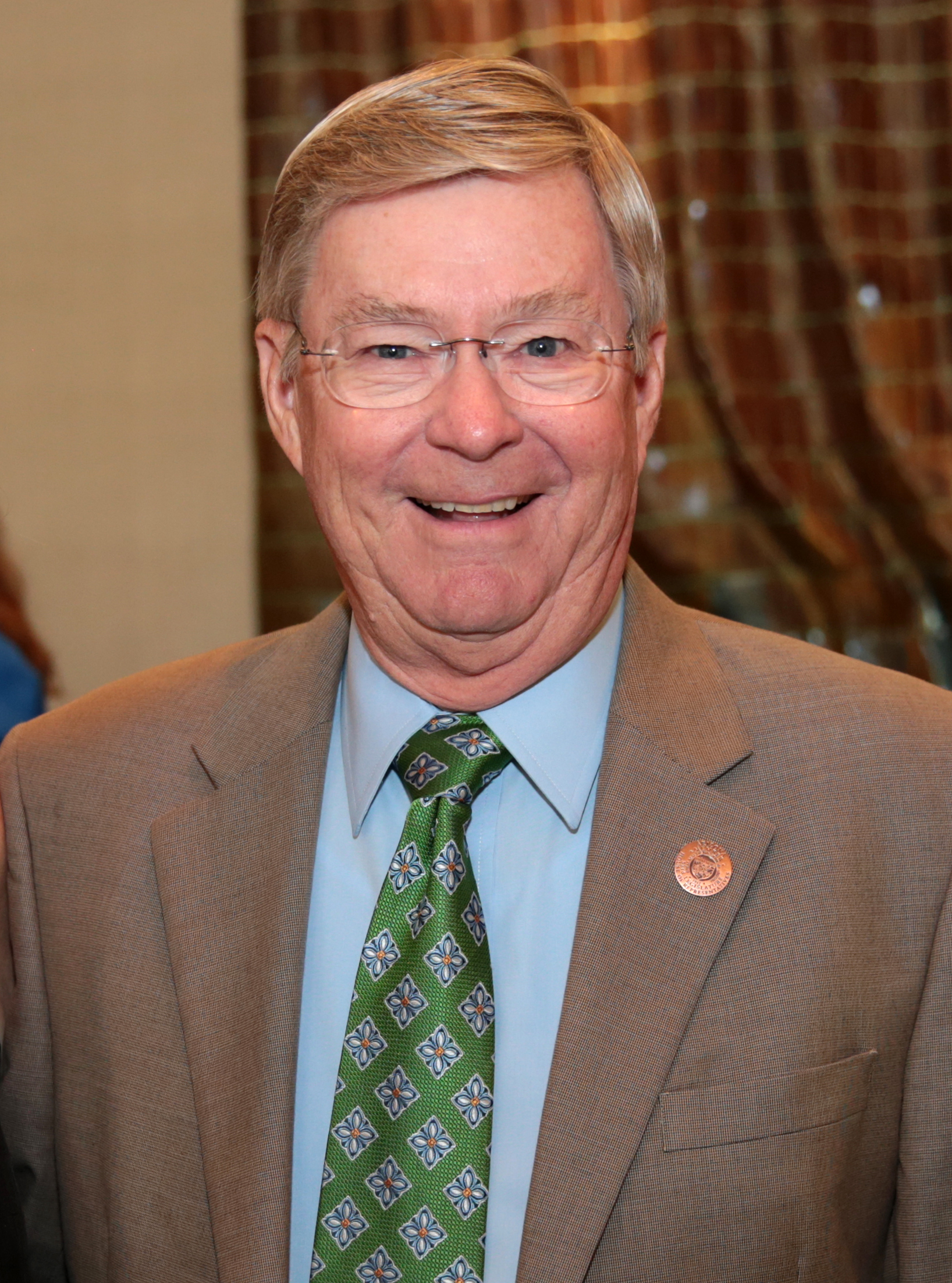
- Leach in 2017

Member of the Arizona Senate
- Incumbent
- Assumed office January 13, 2025
- Preceded by: Justine Wadsack
- Succeeded by: Edgar Soto (elect)
- Constituency: 17th district
- In office January 14, 2019 – January 9, 2023
- Preceded by: Steve Smith
- Succeeded by: Catherine Miranda
- Constituency: 11th district

President pro tempore of the Arizona Senate
- In office January 10, 2021 – January 9, 2023
- Preceded by: Eddie Farnsworth
- Succeeded by: T. J. Shope

Member of the Arizona House of Representatives from the 11th district
- In office January 5, 2015 – January 14, 2019
- Preceded by: Steve Smith
- Succeeded by: Bret Roberts

Personal details
- Born: Wild Rose, Wisconsin, U.S.
- Party: Republican
- Children: 1
- Education: University of Wisconsin, Stevens Point (BA)
- Website: Official website

Venden "Vince" Leach is an American politician from Arizona. A Republican, he is a member of the Arizona State Senate since 2025, and previously from 2019 to 2023. From 2015 to 2019, he was a member of the Arizona House of Representatives representing District 11. Leach won the race for Arizona State Senate from Legislative District 17 in the 2024 Arizona Senate election, defeating incumbent Justine Wadsack who defeated Leach in the 2022 Republican primary.

== Career before politics ==
Originally from Coloma, Wisconsin, Leach received a bachelor's degree in political science/history from the University of Wisconsin, Stevens Point. Leach was a mineral-products salesman in Wisconsin until 2009, when he retired to Arizona. He then became a conservative activist and political candidate.

== Political career ==
In the November 2014 election for District 11 in the Arizona House of Representatives (Pima and Pinal counties), Leach successfully ran alongside fellow Republican Mark Finchem. Finchem received 36,732 votes and Leach received 34,274 votes, defeating Democratic challenger Holly Lyon, who received 27,392 votes in the general election with 34,274 votes. In 2016, Leach and Finchem defeated Democratic candidate Corin Hammond in the general election: Finchem received 52,509 votes, Leach 49,209 votes, and Hammond 42,511 votes. In 2018, he was elected to the state Senate from Legislative District 11, a heavily Republican district, and he was reelected in 2020.

In 2019, Leach voted for a bill expanding so-called "junk" health insurance plans in Arizona that do not protect against pre-existing conditions.

Leach criticized Arizona public schoolteachers over the 2018 Arizona teachers' strike and for wearing red shirts to support salary increases. Leach called the "Red for Ed" movement a "political action" and, in 2019, supported a Republican bill to impose fines of up to $5,000 on educators deemed to have attempted to "indoctrinate" students by influencing their political or religious views.

In 2019, Leach sponsored legislation that would give unrestricted power to the Arizona attorney general to rewrite the ballot text of citizen voter initiatives. The bill failed after at least four Republicans joined all Democrats in opposing it. In 2020, Leach sponsored legislation to weaken the 1998 Voter Protection Act, a voter-approved amendment to the Arizona Constitution that barred the legislature from changing initiatives approved by the voters, unless they "further the purpose" of the voter initiatives and obtained a three-quarters supermajority vote of the Legislature. Leach said that he sponsored the Republican-supported measure due to his opposition to the voter-approved initiatives that authorized medical marijuana and raised the state minimum wage to $12. The bill passed a state Senate committee on a party-line vote.

Leach sponsored several anti-medical marijuana bills in the state Senate; none advanced.

In 2020, Leach promoted the conspiracy theory QAnon, a radical pro-Trump fringe movement, on social media. In 2021, Leach supported legislation that made it easier to purge Arizona voters from the early voting list. The bill, signed into law by Republican Governor Doug Ducey, was one of many efforts by Republicans nationwide to restrict voting following Trump's loss in the 2020 United States presidential election.

In 2021, Leach sponsored legislation that would block any Arizona county or municipal government from banning so-called gay "conversion therapy." At the time, 20 states and Pima County, Arizona had enacted such bans.

In 2022, Leach sponsored Arizona legislation to give the legislature the power to overturn election results. He was defeated for reelection in the Republican primary by Justine Wadsack.

In 2024, Leach ran for reelection to the Arizona state senate from Legislative District 17. In the July 2024 Republican primary election, Leach defeated incumbent Senator Justine Wadsack who had defeated him in the 2022 primary. In the November 2024 general election, Leach faced Democratic nominee John McLean. Leach was declared the winner on November 15, 2024. McLean died less than 24 hours later in Tucson, Arizona, the victim of a suspected drunk driver.

Arizona Senate
Preceded by Eddie Farnsworth	President pro tempore of the Arizona Senate; 2021–2023	Succeeded by T. J. Shope
