= Sajjad Esteki =

Iranian handball player (born 1990)

Personal information
- Nationality: Iranian
- Born: 23 April 1990 (age 36) Isfahan, Iran
- Height: 1.88 m (6 ft 2 in)

Sport
- Sport: Handball
- Position: Centre Back
- Current club: SKIF Krasnodar
- Number: 66

Senior clubs
- Years: Team
- –2015: Samen-e-Sabzevar
- 08-12/2015: TVB 1898 Stuttgart
- 01–06/2016: Al-Gharafa
- 2016–2018: Dinamo București
- 2018–2019: CSM București
- 2019–2021: Cesson Rennes MHB
- 2021–2022: Al-Arabi SC
- 2022: Eger-Eszterházy SzSE
- 2022–2025: CSM Bacău
- 2026–: SKIF Krasnodar
National team
Years	Team	Apps	(Gls)
2006–2022	Iran	63	(350)
Medal record
Asian Games
Silver medal – second place	2010 Guangzhou	Team
Asian Championship
Bronze medal – third place	2014 Manama	Team

Sajjad Esteki (Persian: سجاد استکی, born 23 April 1990) is an Iranian handball player who currently plays for SKIF Krasnodar.

Esteki was the top scorer in the 2009 Youth World Handball Championship with 65 goals. He repeated the same performance in 2011, being top scorer in the Junior World Handball Championship with 84 goals.

Sajjad's older brother, Allahkaram, is also handballer.

== Individual awards ==
- Romanian Liga Națională Best Foreign Player: 2016
- Prosport All-Star Left Back of the Romanian Liga Națională: 2017
- Romanian Liga Națională MVP: 2018
