= Jung Jin-ho (handballer) =

South Korean handball player (born 1986)

- Hangul: 정진호
- RR: Jeong Jinho
- MR: Chŏng Chinho

Jung Jin-ho (born 10 March 1986) is a South Korean handball player. At the 2012 Summer Olympics he competed with the South Korea men's national handball team in the men's tournament, playing as a pivot. As of 2021, he was playing club handball with Incheon Metropolitan City Corporation.
