= Aymen Toumi =

Tunisian handball player (born 1990)

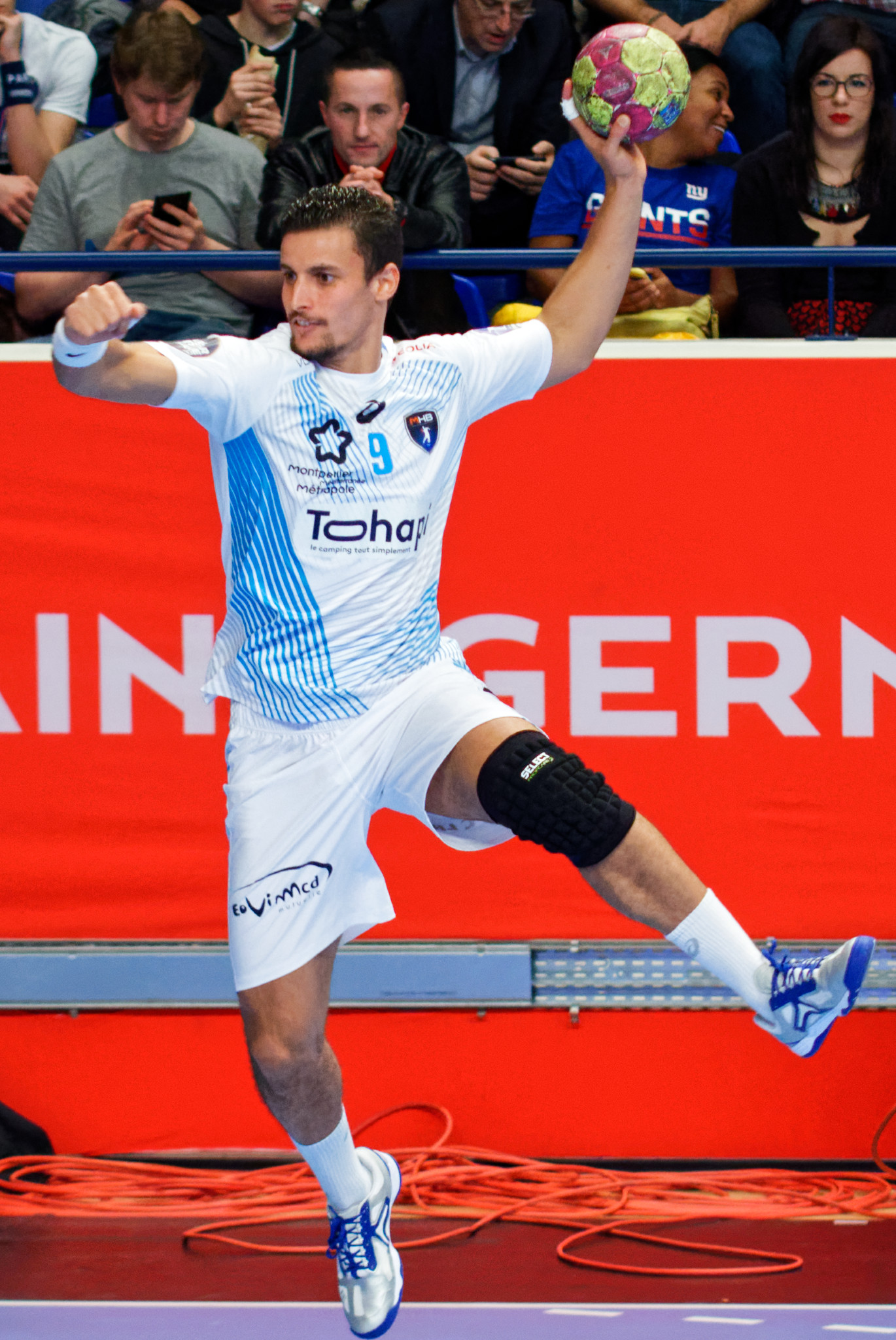

Personal information
- Nationality: Tunisian
- Born: 11 July 1990 (age 36) Sousse, Tunisia
- Height: 1.84 m (6 ft 0 in)

Sport
- Sport: Handball
- Position: Right wing
- Current club: AS Monaco

Senior clubs
- Years: Team
- -2013: ES Sahel
- 2013-2015: HBC Nantes
- 2015-2018: Montpellier Handball
- 2019-2020: Frontignan Thau Handball
- 2020-: AS Monaco
National team
Years	Team	Apps	(Gls)
2011-	Tunisia	95	(163)
Medal record
African Championship
Gold medal – first place	2012 Morocco
Gold medal – first place	2018 Gabon
Junior World Championship
Bronze medal – third place	2011 Greece

Aymen Toumi (born 11 July 1990) is a Tunisian handball player for AS Monaco and the Tunisian national team.

He competed for the Tunisian national team at the 2012 Summer Olympics in London, where the Tunisian team reached the quarterfinals. He was also part of the 2016 Olympic team.

== Honours ==
=== National team ===
African Championship

- Winner: 2012 Morocco

Junior World Championship

- Bronze Medalist: 2011 Greece

=== Club ===
African Super Cup

- Winner: 2013 Sousse
- Runners-up: 2011 Yaoundé

African Champions League

- Winner: 2010 Casablanca
- Runners-up: 2011 Kaduna

African Cup Winners' Cup

- Winner: 2012 Tunis
- Bronze medalist: 2013 Hammamet

Tunisia National League

- (gold) Winner: 2011

Tunisia National Cup

- (gold) Winner: 2010
