= Edgar Soto =

American politician

- Soto speaking in 2026

Member-elect of the Arizona Senate from the 17th district
- Assuming office January 2027
- Succeeding: Vince Leach

Personal details
- Party: Democratic

Edgar Soto is an American politician. A member of the Democratic Party, he is the member-elect for the 17th district of the Arizona Senate.
