= Ragnar Jóhannsson =

Icelandic handball player (bornm 1990)

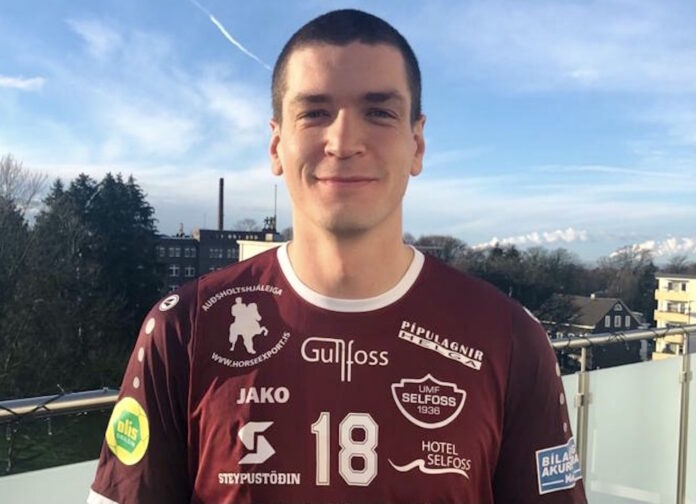

Personal information
- Nationality: Icelandic
- Born: 24 October 1990 (age 35) Selfoss, Iceland
- Height: 1.91 m (6 ft 3 in)

Sport
- Sport: Handball
- Position: RB
- Current club: Selfoss
- Number: 18

Youth career
- Years: Team
- 1999–2006: Selfoss

Senior clubs
- Years: Team
- 2006–2011: Selfoss
- 2011–2015: FH
- 2015–2019: TV Hüttenberg
- 2019–2020: Bergischer HC
- 2021–: Selfoss
National team
Years	Team	Apps	(Gls)
2018–	Iceland	2	(4)

Ragnar Jóhannsson (born 24 October 1990) is an Icelandic handball player for Selfoss.

== Club career ==
Ragnar Jóhannsson made his debut for his boyhood club Selfoss in the 2005/2006 season, when he was only 15 years old.

== International career ==
Ragnar Jóhannsson is on the Icelandic international team. He made his debut in a friendly against Norway on April 5, 2018.
