= Mohamed Sanad =

- محمد سند
- Born: 1954 (age 71–72); Egypt
- Education: Cairo University
- Known for: Small integrated microstrip antennas for mobile phones; broadband deployable base station antennas
- Awards: Innovation Prize for Africa (2012)
- Scientific career
- Fields: Antennas, microstrip antennas, base station design, cellular technology

Mohamed Sanad (Arabic: محمد سند) is an Egyptian antenna scientist and professor in the Faculty of Engineering, Cairo University.

He made contributions to antennas, and holds sixteen patents in the area. The most recent of which is "Design of single and multi-band PIFA" (planar inverted-F antenna). He has also published thirty peer-reviewed papers or conference proceedings. The most recent are three papers at the IEEE Antennas and Propagation Society International Symposium (APSURSI), 2010, IEEE He also worked with Nokia and Motorola on mobile phones.

== IPA Prize Winning Project ==
A low-cost, lightweight, low wind-load, foldable/deployable, multi-broadband base station antenna has been developed using dual parabolic cylindrical reflectors with novel small size broadband resonant feeds invented by the applicant. The new base station antenna has the following 8 important advantages over the existing ones in wireless applications:

1. One base station can cover all wireless applications at different frequency bands including WiMax, digital TV, CDMA, GSM, etc.
2. The station is foldable/deployable and can thus be shipped and stored in a very compact form
3. It is very easy to assemble and disassemble
4. It has a low wind load
5. It is light
6. It can stand on the ground without mounting towers
7. It is low-cost and
8. It can generate beams of arbitrary angles in the horizontal and vertical planes.

Sanad received the Innovation Prize for Africa in 2012.
