= João Ferraz =

Portuguese handball player (born 1990)

Personal information
- Full name: João Miguel Ferraz
- Nationality: Portuguese
- Born: 8 January 1990 (age 36) Funchal, Portugal
- Height: 1.96 m (6 ft 5 in)

Sport
- Sport: Handball
- Position: Right back
- Current club: HSC Suhr Aarau
- Number: 9

Senior clubs
- Years: Team
- 2007–2010: Xico Andebol
- 2010–2012: Madeira SAD
- 2012–2015: FC Porto
- 2015–2019: HSG Wetzlar
- 2020–: HSC Suhr Aarau
National team
Years	Team	Apps	(Gls)
–	Portugal	94	(187)

João Miguel Ferraz (born 8 January 1990) is a Portuguese handball player for HSC Suhr Aarau and the Portuguese national team.

He represented Portugal at the 2020 European Men's Handball Championship.
