= Arizona's 17th legislative district =

American legislative district

- Map of District 17: Approved January 21, 2022
- Senator: Vince Leach (R)
- House members: Rachel Keshel (R); Kevin Volk (D)
- Registration: 38.47% Republican; 28.13% Democratic; 32.02% Other
- Demographics: 70% White; 3% Black/African American; 2% Native American; 4% Asian; 19% Hispanic
- Population: 239,669
- Voting-age population: 192,421
- Registered voters: 175,483

Arizona's 17th legislative district is one of 30 in the state, consisting of sections of Pima County and Pinal County. As of 2023, there are 68 precincts in the district, 63 in Pima and five in Pinal, with a total registered voter population of 175,483. The district has an overall population of 239,669.

Following the 2020 United States redistricting cycle, the Arizona Independent Redistricting Commission (AIRC) redrew legislative district boundaries in Arizona. According to the AIRC, the district is outside of competitive range and considered leaning Republican.

== Political representation ==
The district is represented in the 56th Arizona State Legislature, which convenes from January 1, 2023, to December 31, 2024, by Justine Wadsack (R-Tucson) in the Arizona Senate and by Rachel Jones (R-Tucson) and Cory McGarr (R-Marana) in the Arizona House of Representatives.

Name	Image	Residence	Office	Party
Vince Leach		Tucson	State senator	Republican
Rachel Keshel		Tucson	State representative	Republican
Kevin Volk		Tucson	State representative	Democratic

== Election results ==
The 2022 elections were the first in the newly drawn district.

=== Arizona Senate ===
2022 Arizona's 17th Senate district election
Party	Candidate	Votes	%
Republican	Justine Wadsack	63,501	51.24
Democratic	Mike Nickerson	60,420	48.76
Total votes		123,921	100
Republican hold			

=== Arizona House of Representatives ===
2022 Arizona House of Representatives election, 17th district
Party	Candidate	Votes	%
Republican	Rachel Jones	60,541	26.16
Republican	Cory McGarr	59,385	25.66
Democratic	Dana Allmond	57,503	24.85
Democratic	Brian Radford	54,013	23.34
Total votes		231,442	100.00
Republican hold			
Republican hold			

== See also ==
- List of Arizona legislative districts
- Arizona State Legislature
