= Eddie Farnsworth =

American politician

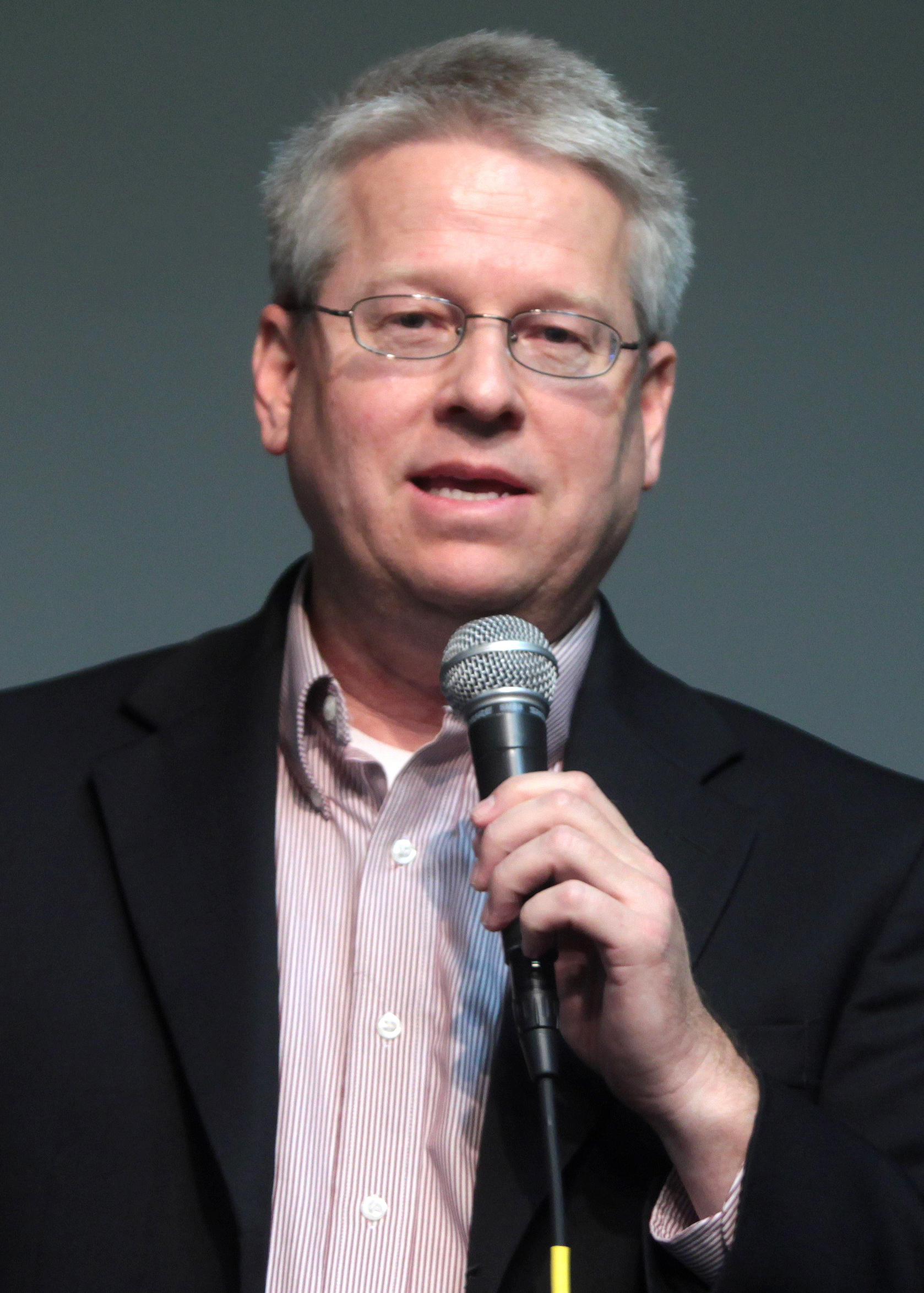
- Farnsworth in 2015

President pro tempore of the Arizona Senate
- In office January 14, 2019 – January 10, 2021
- Preceded by: John Kavanagh
- Succeeded by: Vince Leach

Member of the Arizona Senate from the 12th district
- In office January 14, 2019 – January 10, 2021
- Preceded by: Warren Petersen
- Succeeded by: Warren Petersen

Member of the Arizona House of Representatives from the 12th district
- In office January 14, 2013 – January 7, 2019 Serving with Travis Grantham
- Preceded by: Warren Petersen
- Succeeded by: Warren Petersen

Member of the Arizona House of Representatives from the 22nd district
- In office January 10, 2011 – January 14, 2013 Serving with Steve Urie
- Preceded by: Andy Biggs
- Succeeded by: Phil Lovas
- In office January 6, 2003 – January 5, 2009 Serving with Andy Biggs
- Preceded by: John Loredo
- Succeeded by: Laurin Hendrix

Member of the Arizona House of Representatives from the 30th district
- In office January 8, 2001 – January 6, 2003 Serving with Karen Johnson
- Preceded by: Jeff Groscost
- Succeeded by: Jonathan Paton

Personal details
- Born: May 4, 1961 (age 65) Chandler, Arizona, U.S.
- Party: Republican
- Education: University of Arizona (BA); George Washington University (MBA, JD)
- Website: Official website

Eddie Farnsworth (born May 4, 1961) is an American politician and a former Republican member of the Arizona State House of Representatives and Arizona State Senate. Farnsworth previously served in the House consecutively from January 10, 2011 until January 14, 2013 in the District 22 seat, in the District 12 seat from 2013 to 2019, and non-consecutively from January 2001 until January 2009 in the District 22 and District 30 seats. Farnsworth served in the State Senate representing District 12 from January 14, 2019 to his retirement in 2021.

== Education ==
Farnsworth earned his BA from the University of Arizona and his MBAs in investments and finance from George Washington University and his JD from its law school.

== Elections ==
- 2000 – When District 30 incumbent Republican Representative Jeff Groscost ran for Arizona Senate, Farnsworth ran alongside incumbent Representative Karen Johnson in the three-way September 12, 2000 Republican Primary, placing first with 9,773 votes, and took the first seat in the four-way November 7, 2000 General election with 45,473 votes, with Representative Johnson taking the second seat ahead of Democratic nominees Eileen Fellner (who had run for the seat in 1996) and Linda Tongé.
- 2002 – Redistricted to District 22, Representative Johnson redistricted to District 18, and with incumbent Democratic Representatives Richard Miranda running for Arizona Senate and John Loredo redistricted to District 13, Farnsworth ran in the five-way September 10, 2002 Republican Primary, placing first with 6,917 votes ahead of Andy Biggs; Biggs and Farnsworth were unopposed for the November 5, 2002 General election with Biggs taking the first seat and Farnsworth taking the second seat with 27,630 votes.
- 2004 – Farnsworth and Representative Biggs were unopposed for the September 7, 2004 Republican Primary; Farnsworth placed first with 12,157 votes; In the three-way November 2, 2004 General election, Farnsworth won the first seat with 55,674 votes, and Biggs won the second seat ahead of Libertarian candidate Wade Reynolds.
- 2006 – Farnsworth and Representative Biggs were challenged in the four-way September 12, 2006 Republican Primary; Farnsworth placed first with 8,991 votes, and Biggs placed second; in the November 7, 2006 General election, Farnsworth took the first seat with 38,817 votes and Biggs took the second seat ahead of Libertarian candidate Edward Schwebel.
- 2008 – Challenging incumbent Republican Senator Thayer Verschoor, Farnsworth ran in the three-way September 2, 2008 Republican Primary, but lost to Senator Verschoor; Verschoor was unopposed for the November 2, 2010 General election, and served in the seat from 2003 until 2011.
- 2010 – With incumbent Representative Biggs running for Arizona Senate, Farnsworth ran alongside incumbent Representative Laurin Hendrix in the six-way August 24, 2010 Republican Primary, placing first with 16,727 votes, Steve Urie placed second, and Representative Hendrix third; Farnsworth and Urie were unopposed for the November 2, 2010 General election; Farnsworth took the first seat with 51,533 votes and Urie took the second seat.
- 2012 – Redistricted to District 12, and with incumbent Republican Representatives Steve Montenegro redistricted to District 13 and Jerry Weiers retiring, Farnsworth ran in the three-way August 28, 2012 Republican Primary; Farnsworth placed first with 14,816 votes, with Warren Petersen taking second ahead of former state Senator Larry Chesley; Farnsworth and Petersen were unopposed for the November 6, 2012 General election, with Farnsworth taking the first seat with 53,925 votes and Petersen taking the second seat.
- 2014 – Farnsworth and Warren Petersen were unopposed in the Republican primary. Farnsworth and Petersen defeated D.J. Rothans in the general election, with Farnsworth receiving 32,843 votes.
- 2016 – Farnsworth ran against Republicans Travis Grantham and Lacinda Lewis in the primary, placing first. Farnsworth and Grantham then ran unopposed in the District 12 November general election. Farnsworth received the most votes in the general election with 67,225 votes.
- 2018 – Farnsworth ran for District 12's seat in the Arizona State Senate, beating Jenny Lindblom in the Republican primaries. Farnsworth went on to win the general election against Democrat Elizabeth Brown with 60,959 votes.

== Controversy ==
Eddie Farnsworth sold off his chain of charter schools, Benjamin Franklin Charter School, to a non-profit in a record $56.9 million dollar deal. Farnsworth personally netted $13.9 million, taking advantage of loose regulations of charter school write-offs in the state of Arizona. Farnsworth is continuing to be paid for the lease of the School's headquarters as well as being on the payroll as a consultant. Farnsworth has long been an advocate for prioritizing charter schools in Arizona. Former Governor Doug Ducey, had called for reform in the state after cries of profiteering from the sale.

The charter chain receives about $20 million annually from the State of Arizona to educate 3,000 students at its Gilbert and Queen Creek campuses.

Arizona Senate
Preceded by John Kavanagh	President pro tempore of the Arizona Senate; 2019–2021	Succeeded by Vince Leach
