= Warren Petersen =

American politician (born 1976)

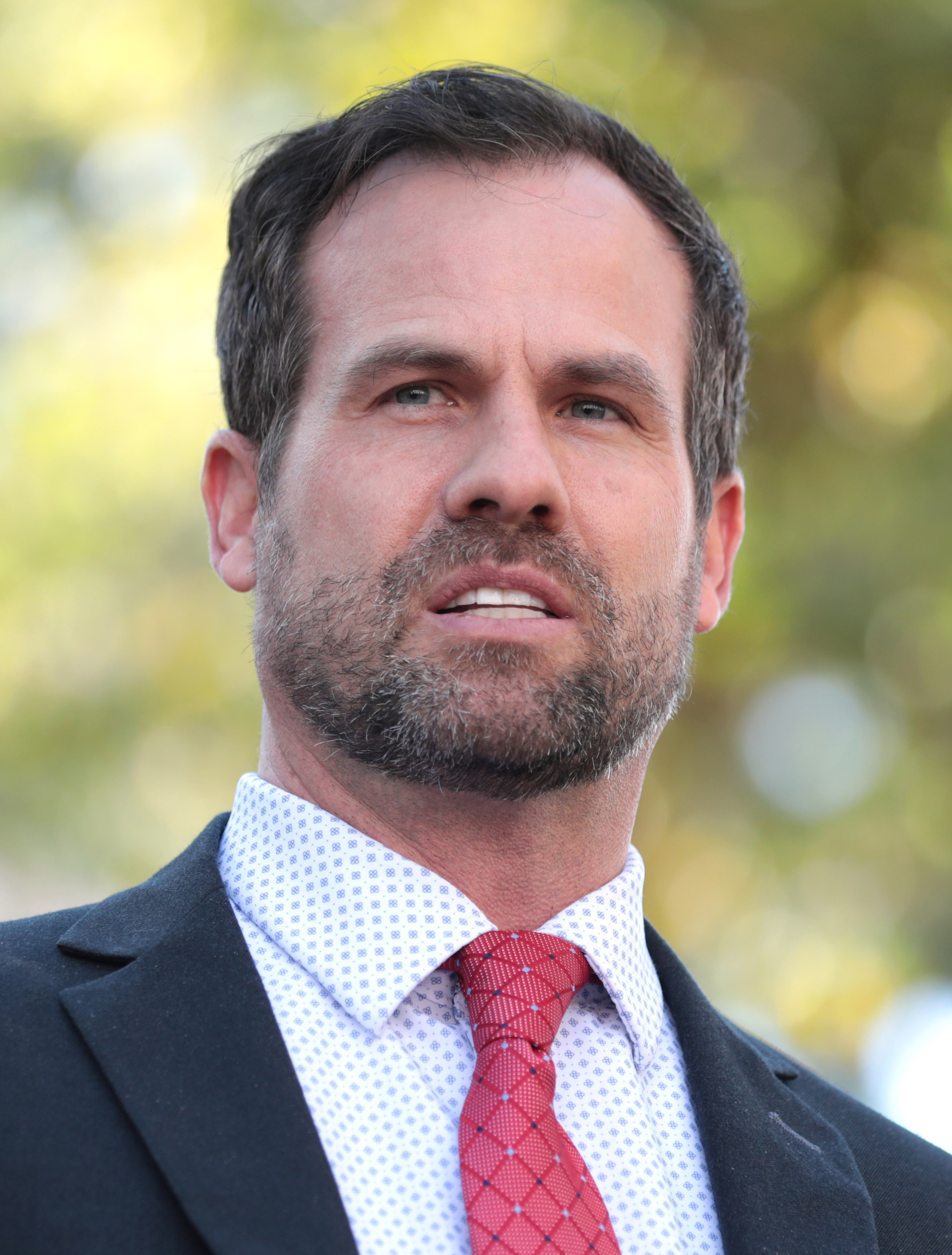
- Petersen in 2023

President of the Arizona Senate
- Incumbent
- Assumed office January 9, 2023
- Preceded by: Karen Fann

Member of the Arizona Senate
- Incumbent
- Assumed office January 11, 2021
- Preceded by: Eddie Farnsworth
- Succeeded by: Stephanie Walsh (elect)
- Constituency: 12th district (2021–2023); 14th district (2023–present)
- In office January 9, 2017 – January 14, 2019
- Preceded by: Andy Biggs
- Succeeded by: Eddie Farnsworth
- Constituency: 12th district

Majority Leader of the Arizona House of Representatives
- In office January 14, 2019 – January 11, 2021
- Preceded by: Steve Montenegro
- Succeeded by: Ben Toma

Member of the Arizona House of Representatives from the 12th district
- In office January 14, 2019 – January 11, 2021
- Preceded by: Eddie Farnsworth
- Succeeded by: Jake Hoffman
- In office January 14, 2013 – January 9, 2017
- Preceded by: Jerry Weiers
- Succeeded by: Travis Grantham

Personal details
- Born: September 8, 1976 (age 50) Wentworth, Missouri, U.S.
- Party: Republican
- Spouse: Denisse Benitez
- Children: 5
- Education: Arizona State University, Tempe (BA, JD)
- Website: Campaign website

Warren H. Petersen (born September 8, 1976) is an American politician and a Republican member of the Arizona Senate representing District 14 from January 9, 2023. He serves as President of the Arizona Senate. He formerly was a State Representative, also representing District 12. He was elected by his peers to serve as Majority Leader from 2018 to 2019. He was the Republican nominee in the 2026 Arizona Attorney General election.

== Arizona State Legislature ==
=== Elections ===
In 2012, Arizona redistricted and Legislative District 12 was drawn to cover Gilbert and Queen Creek. Steve Urie decided to leave the legislature, leaving an open seat in the House. Petersen ran in the three-way August 28, 2012, Republican primary. Incumbent Representative Eddie Farnsworth placed first, Petersen placed second with 12,500 votes, and former state Senator Larry Chesley placed third with 8,688 votes. Farnsworth and Petersen were unopposed in the November 6, 2012, general election, with Farnsworth placing first and Petersen taking second with 52,590 votes.

In 2014, Petersen and Farnsworth were unopposed in the primary, with Petersen placing first with 16,442 votes and Farnsworth placing second with 15,351 votes. In November, there was a three-way general election with Petersen taking first with 34,784 votes, Farnsworth taking second with 32,843 and Rothans receiving 18,446 votes for third place.

In 2016, Andy Biggs left the Arizona Senate to run for Congress in CD5. Petersen ran to replace Biggs in the State Senate. Petersen won the General Election 69,356 votes to Elizabeth Brown's 37,178 votes.

=== State House of Representatives ===
In 2013 Petersen co-sponsored HB2608 with 37 other state legislators, amending retirement plans for elected officials. It closed the Elected Officials Retirement Plan (EORP), placing future elected officials in the Elected Officials' Defined Contribution Retirement System (EORS).

In 2015 Petersen sponsored HB2212, closing the Arizona Weights and Measures Department.

In 2016 Petersen co-sponsored HB2114 with 8 other state legislators, which recognized a signed agreement as presumption of independent contractor status.

In 2017, Peteren co-sponsored SB1350 along with 4 other state legislators, expanding the crime of terrorism and established related mandatory minimum sentences. Created new crimes regarding terrorist threats and false reporting.

In 2018 Petersen introduced SB1273 which provides an additional avenue for a person to petition the Governor's Regulatory Review Council (Council) to review an existing agency practice, substantive policy statement, final rule or regulatory licensing requirement not specifically authorized by law based on outlined requirements. Establishes opportunities for parties in adjudicative cases to participate in a settlement or mediation and seek disposition.

In 2019 Petersen co-sponsored HB2569 along with 32 other state legislators. The legislation allows workers from any state to come to Arizona and get an occupational license as long as they were licensed in the state they came from.

=== State Senate ===
==== Gender Identity Legislation and Litigation ====
In 2022, Petersen sponsored SB 1138, which prohibited healthcare providers from performing gender-affirming surgeries for minors, including procedures to modify chest appearance to align with gender identity. Governor Doug Ducey signed the bill into law in March 2022, stating it would protect minors from "irreversible procedures." Healthcare professionals testified during legislative hearings that the law could conflict with evolving medical standards of care, while LGBTQ+ advocates expressed concerns about the law's impact on youth mental health.

That same legislative session saw the passage of SB 1165, which restricted participation in school sports based on assigned sex at birth. The Arizona Interscholastic Sports Medicine Advisory Committee reported that among approximately 170,000 students under its oversight, only 16 transgender students had sought to participate in sports aligned with their gender identity since 2017.

In 2024, after parents of two transgender students filed a constitutional challenge to SB 1165, Petersen became involved in defending the law when Attorney General Kris Mayes declined to do so. The lawsuit alleged violations of the Equal Protection Clause, Title IX, the Americans with Disabilities Act, and the Rehabilitation Act.

U.S. District Court Judge Jennifer Zipps ordered Petersen and House Speaker Ben Toma to produce emails related to the law's passage and submit to questioning, ruling they had waived legislative privilege by voluntarily joining the lawsuit. The court's examination centered on whether the law served a "constitutionally permissible purpose" and was "substantially related to an important government objective." After the Supreme Court, through Justice Elena Kagan, declined to block this order, the case proceeded with continued challenges to the law's constitutionality.

==== EPA Vehicle Emissions Litigation ====
In May 2024, Petersen, along with House Speaker Ben Toma and the Arizona Trucking Association, filed two lawsuits challenging the Environmental Protection Agency's new vehicle emissions standards in the U.S. Court of Appeals for the District of Columbia. The EPA rules, announced in March 2024, would require that approximately two-thirds of new passenger vehicles and a quarter of new heavy trucks sold in the United States be electric by 2032.

The lawsuits claimed the regulations exceeded the EPA's legal authority and were "arbitrary, capricious, an abuse of discretion, and otherwise not in accordance with law." Petersen argued the rules would increase consumer costs and strain the power grid, while EPA Administrator Michael Regan defended them as necessary measures to address climate change and improve air quality. This legal challenge followed Petersen's March 2024 lawsuit against the EPA's new air pollution standards, which he filed alongside the Arizona Chamber of Commerce.

==== HB 2492 Voter Registration Requirements Litigation ====
In 2022, Arizona enacted HB 2492, which required documentary proof of citizenship for residents registering to vote using state-created forms and restricted presidential voting and mail-in ballot access for those who couldn't provide such proof. After legal challenges from voting rights groups and the Biden administration, the law was not initially enforced.

On August 22, 2024, the Supreme Court issued a split decision on an emergency request from Petersen and the Republican National Committee. The Court allowed Arizona to require documentary proof of citizenship for new registrants using state forms, but rejected enforcing such requirements for presidential election voting or mail-in ballots. This decision partially stayed a federal district court's permanent injunction against the law while appeals continued. The state's Democratic officials, including Attorney General Kris Mayes, had opposed reinstating the requirements, arguing it would be "destabilizing" so close to the November election.

The underlying legal dispute centered on whether the National Voter Registration Act preempted Arizona's stricter requirements, with voting rights advocates arguing the law could disenfranchise eligible voters. The case marked the first 2024 presidential election matter to reach the Supreme Court.

==== Legislative Conflicts with Governor Hobbs ====
As Senate President in 2024, Petersen led Republican legislative efforts to bypass Democratic Governor Katie Hobbs's vetoes through increased use of ballot referrals. After Hobbs issued 143 vetoes in 2023, predominantly on Republican-supported legislation, Petersen and other Republican lawmakers proposed over 70 ballot referrals in 2024. While only two referrals were initially approved for the ballot, Petersen maintained a strategic approach to further referrals, telling reporters to "Stay tuned" when questioned about Republican leadership's plans.

==== Opposition to Grand Canyon National Monument ====
In August 2023, President Biden established the Baaj Nwaavjo I'tah Kukveni – Ancestral Footprints of the Grand Canyon National Monument, protecting approximately 917,618 acres of land surrounding the Grand Canyon. As Senate President, Petersen took legal action to challenge the designation, filing a lawsuit along with then-House Speaker Ben Toma, State Treasurer Kimberly Yee, and several local governments.

The lawsuit argued that Biden lacked the authority to create the monument under the Antiquities Act and claimed the designation would harm state and local communities by permanently barring uranium mining and complicating land development. On January 27, 2025, federal Judge Stephen McNamee dismissed the case, ruling that the plaintiffs lacked standing to sue based on their claims.

Following the court defeat, Petersen sought to overturn the monument designation through executive action. In February 2025, he sent a letter to U.S. Secretary of the Interior Doug Burgum requesting a meeting to discuss ending what he termed "government overreach" and the ban on uranium mining in the area. Petersen argued that the monument designation affected potential extraction of over 300 million pounds of uranium, which he claimed would impact energy independence and costs.

== Role in 2020 Election Review Controversy ==
As Chairman of the Arizona Senate Judiciary Committee, Petersen was involved in a controversial review of Maricopa County's 2020 presidential election results. In December 2020, Petersen, along with Senate President Karen Fann, issued subpoenas for ballots, tabulation machines, and other election materials from Maricopa County. The Senate subsequently contracted Cyber Ninjas, a Florida-based firm with no prior election experience, to conduct what became known as the "Arizona Audit."

The review, which involved a hand recount of nearly 2.1 million ballots, concluded in September 2021 and confirmed Joe Biden's victory in Maricopa County, finding he had actually won by approximately 260 more votes than officially recorded. While the audit team made various allegations about election procedures, county officials demonstrated that these claims resulted from the auditors' lack of understanding of election processes and Arizona election law. Later revealed communications showed that Cyber Ninjas' CEO Doug Logan had acknowledged not knowing Arizona election law when hired, and that contractors struggled with basic ballot counting procedures.

In 2022, the Arizona Supreme Court unanimously ruled that Petersen and other Senate officials could withhold approximately 1,000 emails, text messages, and other communications related to the review under legislative privilege. The court determined that because the review was a legislative activity that could lead to new election laws, these internal communications were exempt from public records disclosure. This ruling overturned lower court decisions that had favored broader public access to the records.

The review, which cost significantly more than the Senate's initial $150,000 contract with Cyber Ninjas, was largely funded by external groups supporting baseless claims of election fraud. Documents later revealed that the contractors had extensive communications with individuals involved in efforts to overturn the 2020 election results, including some who were later indicted in Arizona's fake elector scheme.

Arizona House of Representatives
Preceded by Steve Montenegro	Majority Leader of the Arizona House of Representatives; 2019–2021	Succeeded by Ben Toma
Political offices
Preceded by Karen Fann	President of the Arizona Senate; 2023–present	Incumbent
