= 2026 Arizona Attorney General election =

- November 3, 2026
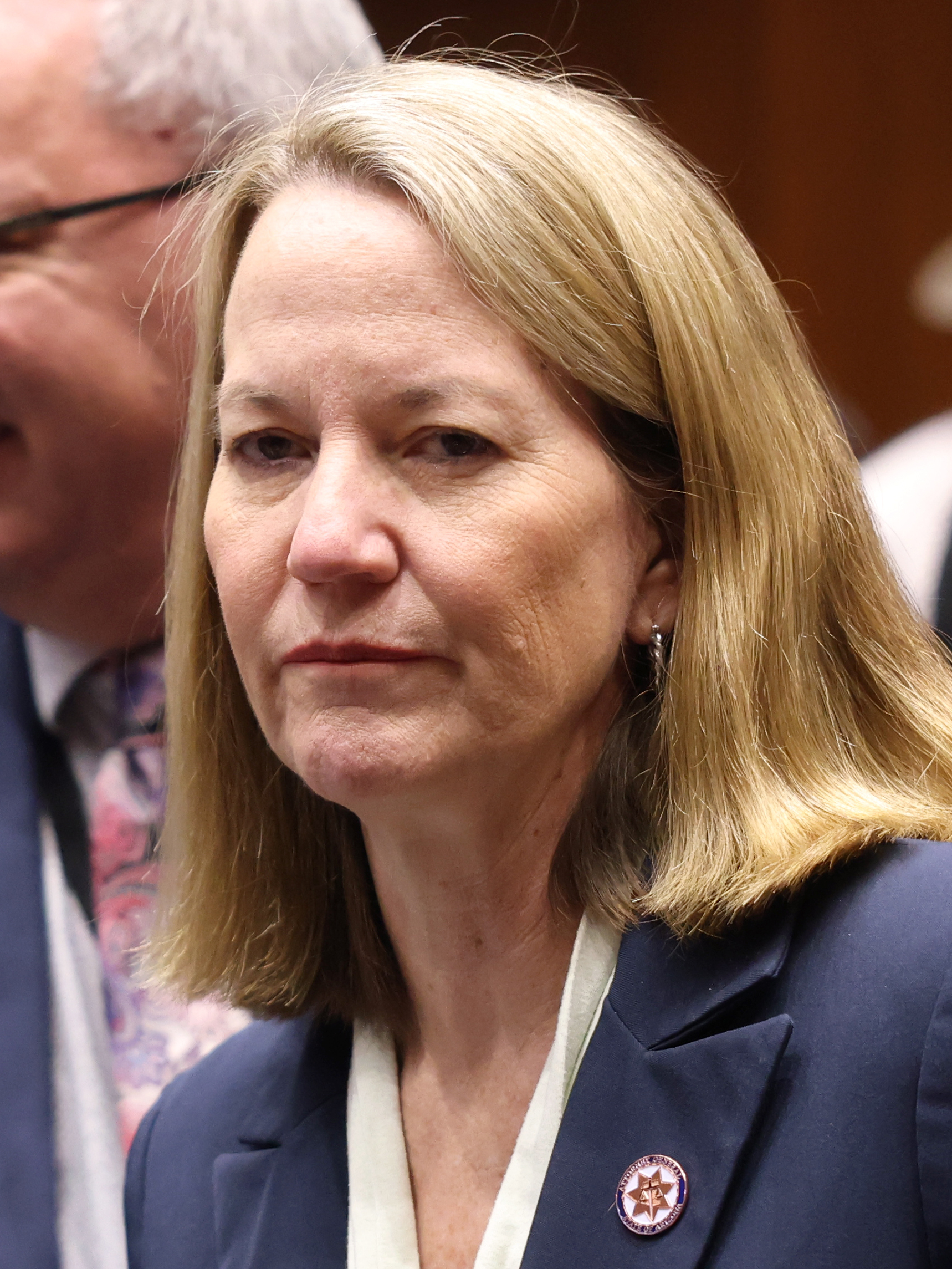

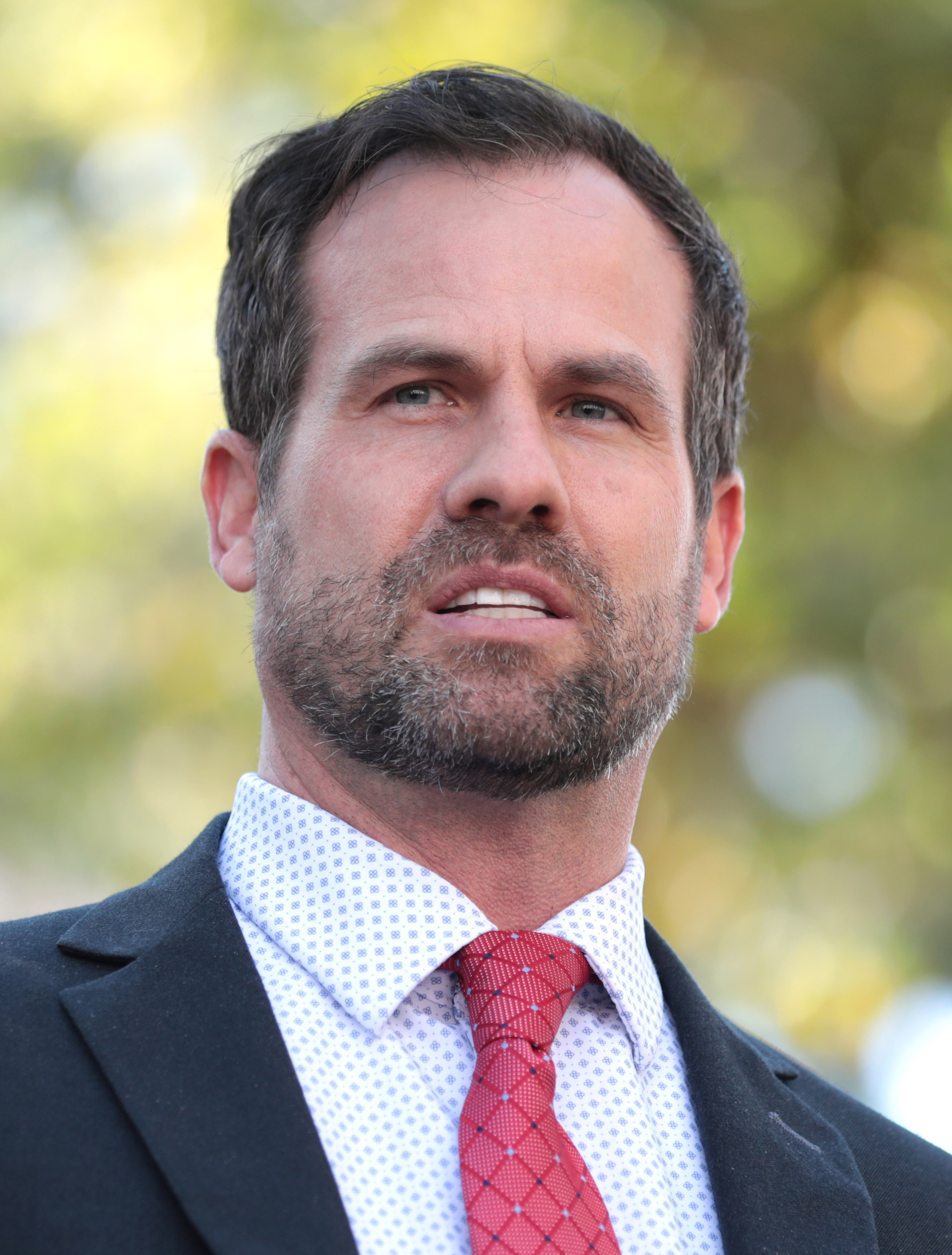
Nominee	Kris Mayes	Warren Petersen
Party	Democratic	Republican
Popular vote	1,396,980	1,120,365
Percentage	55.5%	44.5%
- Mayes: 50–60% 60–70% 70–80% Petersen: 50–60% 60–70% 70–80%
Attorney General before election
Kris Mayes
Democratic
Elected Attorney General
Kris Mayes
Democratic

The 2026 Arizona Attorney General election took place on November 3, 2026, to elect the attorney general of Arizona. Democratic incumbent Kris Mayes won a second term, defeating Republican state Senate president Warren Petersen. The primary election took place on July 21, 2026.

== Democratic primary ==
=== Candidates ===
==== Nominee ====
- Kris Mayes, incumbent attorney general (2023–present)

=== Endorsements ===
Kris Mayes

Organizations

- Alliance for Retired Americans Arizona
- EMILYs List
- End Citizens United
- Giffords
- LGBTQ+ Victory Fund
- Jewish Democratic Council of America
- LPAC
- National Women's Political Caucus
- Vote Mama

=== Results ===
Democratic primary results
Party	Candidate	Votes	%
Democratic	Kris Mayes (incumbent)	502,510	100.0
Total votes		502,510	100.0

== Republican primary ==
=== Candidates ===
==== Nominee ====
- Warren Petersen, president of the Arizona Senate (2023–present) from the 14th district (2017–2019, 2021–present)

==== Eliminated in primary ====
- Rodney Glassman, former Tucson city councilor, candidate for attorney general in 2022, Republican nominee for Corporation Commission in 2018, and Democratic nominee for U.S. Senate in 2010

==== Withdrawn ====
- Greg Roeberg, attorney

=== Endorsements ===
Rodney Glassman

U.S. representatives

- Paul Gosar, AZ-08 (2011–present)

Statewide officials

- Tom Horne, Arizona superintendent of public instruction (2003–2011, 2023–present)
Warren Petersen

U.S. representatives

- Andy Biggs, AZ-05 (2017–present)

Statewide officials

- Raúl Labrador, attorney general of Idaho (2023–present)

=== Polling ===
Poll source	Date(s) administered	Sample size (Note: Key: A – all adults RV – registered voters LV – likely voters V – unclear)	Margin of error	Warren Petersen	Rodney Glassman	Undecided
NextGen Polling	July 8–9, 2026	1,707 (LV)	± 2.5%	43%	28%	29%
NextGen Polling	June 16–17, 2026	1,683 (RV)	± 2.5%	26%	20%	55%
GrayHouse (R)	October 26–28, 2025	397 (LV)	± 4.9%	16%	8%	76%

=== Results ===
Primary results by county: Petersen: 50–60%; Glassman: 50–60%

Results by precinct Petersen: 50–60%; 60–70%; 70–80%; 80–90%; 90–100%; Glassman: 50–60%; 60–70%; 70–80%; 80–90%; 90–100%; Tie: 50%; No votes

Republican primary results
Party	Candidate	Votes	%
Republican	Warren Petersen	333,955	56.4
Republican	Rodney Glassman	258,173	43.6
Total votes		592,128	100.0

== General election ==
=== Predictions ===
Source	Ranking	As of
Sabato's Crystal Ball	Lean D	August 20, 2026

=== Post-primary endorsements ===
Kris Mayes (D)

Organizations

- Everytown for Gun Safety
Warren Petersen (R)

Statewide officials

- Doug Ducey, former governor of Arizona (2015–2023)

State legislators

- Lydia Hernandez, state representative from LD-24 (2023–present) and LD-29 (2013–2015) (Democratic)

=== Polling ===
Poll source	Date(s) administered	Sample size	Margin of error	Kris Mayes (D)	Warren Petersen (R)	Other	Undecided
GrayHouse (R) (Note: Poll commissioned by Elijah Norton's campaign, the Republican candidate running for 2026 Arizona State Treasurer election)	October 28–29, 2026	500 (LV)	± 4.2%	49%	47%	—	—
Noble Predictive Insights	October 26–28, 2026	511 (LV)	± 4.3%	50%	46%	—	4%
HighGround, Inc.	October 21–25, 2026	400 (LV)	± 4.9%	52%	41%	0% (Note: "Some other candidate" with <1%)	7%
GrayHouse (R)	October 18–20, 2026	550 (LV)	± 4.2%	50%	47%	—	2%
HighGround, Inc.	October 6–8, 2026	400 (LV)	± 4.9%	51%	37%	1% (Note: "Some other candidate" with 1%)	11%
Grayhouse (R)	October 6–8, 2026	550 (LV)	± 4.2%	48%	46%	—	6%
Global Strategy Group (D) (Note: Poll sponsored by the Democratic Attorneys General Association.)	September 27 – October 1, 2026	—	± 3.5%	50%	43%	—	—
Equis Research	September 1–9, 2026	1,214 (RV)	± 3.2%	45%	45%	—	10%
Arizona State University	August 18 – September 4, 2026	1,300 (RV)	± 2.7%	42%	36%	–	22%
Next Gen Polling	August 17–19, 2026	1,627 (RV)	± 2.6%	37%	34%	–	29%
HighGround, Inc.	August 15–18, 2026	400 (LV)	± 4.9%	48%	40%	0%	11%
Grayhouse (R)	August 11–13, 2026	600 (LV)	± 4.0%	47%	46%	–	7%
Stealth Analytics	August 11–13, 2026	530 (LV)	± 4.3%	41%	38%	–	21%
Noble Predictive Insights	August 10–13, 2026	923 (LV)	± 3.2%	44%	38%	2% (Note: "Another candidate not listed" with 2%)	16%
Fabrizio Ward (R)/ Impact Research (D) (Note: Poll sponsored by AARP)	July 26–28, 2026	913 (LV)	± 3.2%	48%	43%	1%	9%

Hypothetical polling

Mayes vs. Generic Republican

Poll source	Date(s) administered	Sample size	Margin of error	Kris Mayes (D)	Generic Republican (R)	Undecided
GrayHouse (R)	October 26–28, 2025	744 (RV)	± 3.6%	40%	41%	19%

=== Results ===
2026 Arizona Attorney General election
Party	Candidate	Votes	%	±%
Democratic	Kris Mayes (incumbent)			
Republican	Warren Petersen			
Total votes			100.0%	
Democratic hold				

== See also ==
- 2026 Arizona elections

== Notes ==
Partisan clients
