= Andy Biggs =

American politician (born 1958)

- Official portrait, 2017

Member of the U.S. House of Representatives from Arizona's 5th district
- Incumbent
- Assumed office January 3, 2017
- Preceded by: Matt Salmon
House positions
Chair of the House Freedom Caucus
In office October 1, 2019 – January 1, 2022
Preceded by	Mark Meadows
Succeeded by	Scott Perry

President of the Arizona Senate
- In office January 14, 2013 – January 3, 2017
- Preceded by: Steve Pierce
- Succeeded by: Steve Yarbrough

Member of the Arizona Senate
- In office January 10, 2011 – January 3, 2017
- Preceded by: Thayer Verschoor
- Succeeded by: Warren Petersen
- Constituency: 22nd district (2011–2013); 12th district (2013–2017)

Member of the Arizona House of Representatives from the 22nd district
- In office January 6, 2003 – January 10, 2011 Serving with Eddie Farnsworth, Laurin Hendrix
- Preceded by: Richard Miranda; John A. Loredo
- Succeeded by: Eddie Farnsworth; Steve Urie

Personal details
- Born: Andrew Steven Biggs; November 7, 1958 (age 68) Tucson, Arizona, U.S.
- Party: Republican
- Spouse: Cindy Biggs (m. 1982)
- Children: 6
- Education: Brigham Young University (BA); University of Arizona (JD); Arizona State University, Phoenix (MA)
- Website: House website Campaign website
- Biggs's voice Biggs opposing FISA reauthorization Recorded March 11, 2020

Andrew Steven Biggs (born November 7, 1958) is an American politician and lawyer serving as the U.S. representative for Arizona's 5th congressional district since 2017. A member of the Republican Party, Biggs served as a member of the Arizona House of Representatives from 2003 to 2011 and a member of the Arizona Senate from 2011 to 2017. He was president of the Arizona Senate from 2013 to 2017. Biggs served as chairman of the Freedom Caucus from 2019 to 2022.

Born and raised in Tucson, Arizona Biggs worked as a lawyer in Hobbs, New Mexico later moving back to Arizona and made a successful campaign for the Arizona House of Representatives in 2002. Biggs was re-elected in 2004, 2006 and in 2008. Biggs did not seek re-election in the house and ran successfully for the Arizona Senate first being elected in 2010. Biggs would be re-elected in 2012 and in 2014. During his tenure, Biggs became the President of the Arizona Senate from 2013 until his retirement in 2017 presiding over a Republican controlled Senate.

Biggs ran for the United States House of Representatives in the 2016 elections for Arizona's 5th congressional district to succeed Matt Salmon and won defeating Democratic nominee Talia Fuentes receiving 65% of the vote in the general election. Biggs would be re-elected in 2018, 2020, 2022 and in 2024 receiving wide margins of victory in each of his elections. The district, which was once represented by U.S. Senators John McCain and Jeff Flake, is in the heart of the East Valley and includes part of Mesa, most of Chandler, all of Queen Creek and Biggs's residence of Gilbert.

Biggs was the Republican nominee in the 2026 Arizona gubernatorial election challenging Governor Katie Hobbs in the general election. Biggs selected Sine Kerr as his running mate. Biggs called Hobbs a failure and accused her of hiding from the public when she refused to debate him. Biggs lost the general election to Hobbs on November 3.

A staunch ally of President Donald Trump, Biggs supported Trump in the 2016, 2020 and in the 2024 United States presidential elections. Biggs supported Trumps attempts to overturn the 2020 United States presidential election. Biggs is Pro life and is described as a Right-wing populist.

== Early life and education ==
Biggs was born on November 7, 1958, in Tucson, Arizona. When he was young, Biggs went on a mission to Japan for the Church of Jesus Christ of Latter-day Saints and learned to speak fluent Japanese. He later earned his Bachelor of Arts in Asian studies from Brigham Young University in 1982, his Juris Doctor from the University of Arizona in 1984, and his Master of Arts in political science from Arizona State University in 1999.

Biggs worked as a lawyer for a firm based in Hobbs, New Mexico, before relocating to Phoenix, where he worked as a prosecutor. In 1993, he won $10 million in the American Family Publishers sweepstakes. He appeared in a TV ad with Dick Clark and Ed McMahon to promote the sweepstakes.

== Arizona Legislature ==
=== State House of Representatives ===
In 2002, with Republican Representative Eddie Farnsworth redistricted from District 30, Biggs ran in the five-way September 10 Republican primary, placing second with 5,778 votes. Biggs and Farnsworth were unopposed in the general election, where Biggs took the first seat with 31,812 votes and Farnsworth took the second.

In 2004, Biggs and Farnsworth were unopposed in the September 7 Republican primary; Farnsworth placed first and Biggs placed second with 11,202 votes. In the three-way general election, Farnsworth took the first seat and Biggs the second with 51,932 votes, ahead of Libertarian candidate Wade Reynolds.

In 2006, Biggs and Farnsworth were challenged in the four-way September 12 Republican primary; Farnsworth placed first and Biggs placed second with 7,793 votes. In the three-way general election, Farnsworth took the first seat and Biggs the second with 38,085 votes, ahead of Libertarian candidate Edward Schwebel.

In 2008, with Farnsworth running for Arizona Senate and leaving a House District 22 seat open, Biggs ran in the four-way September 2 Republican primary, placing first with 9,800 votes. Biggs and fellow Republican nominee Laurin Hendrix won the general election, where Biggs took the first seat with 59,615 votes and Hendrix the second, ahead of Democratic nominee Glenn Ray, who had run for the district's senate seat in 2006.

=== State Senate ===
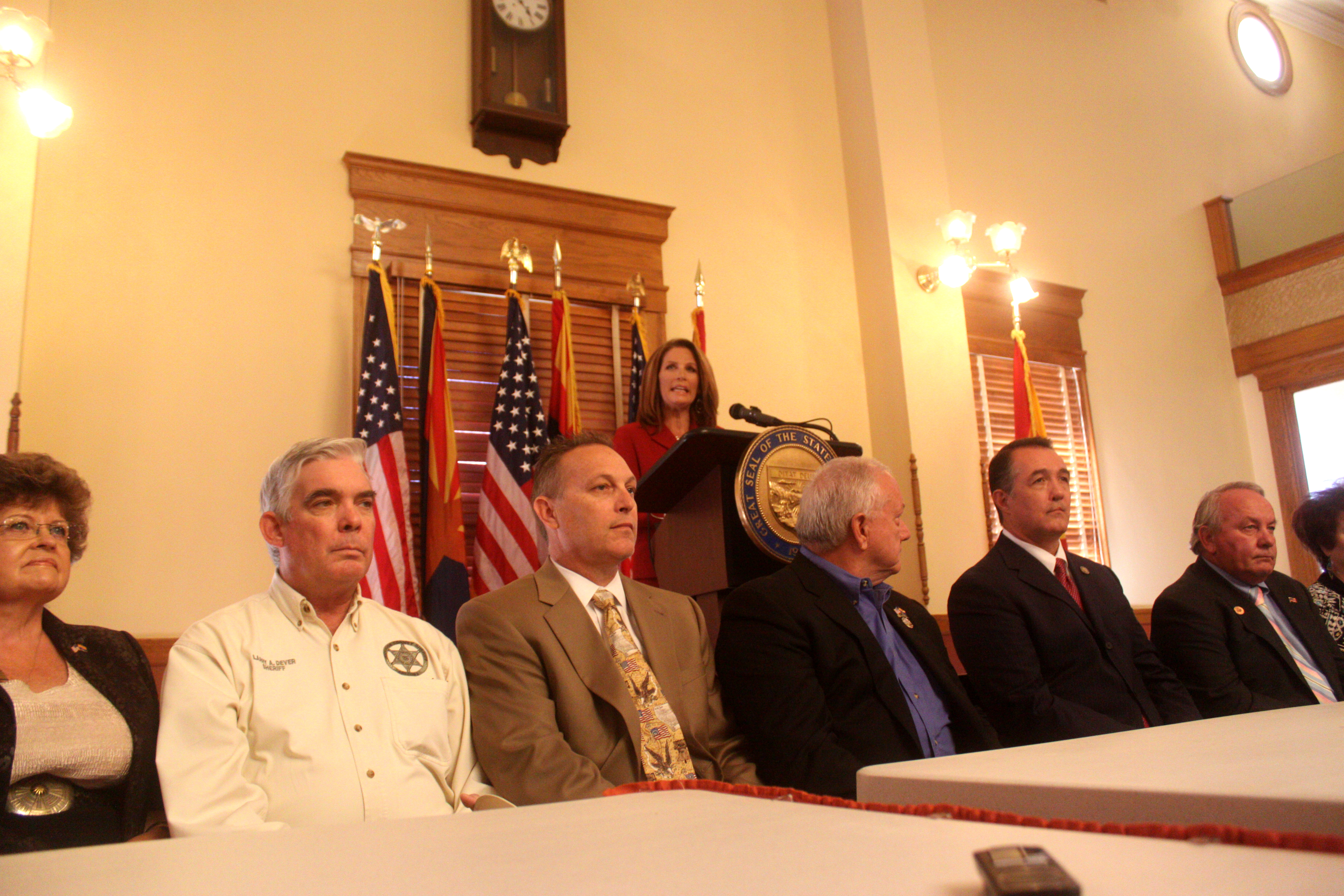
The then State Senator Biggs at a press conference held by then Congresswoman Michele Bachmann

In 2010, when Republican Senator Thayer Verschoor ran for State Treasurer of Arizona and left the Senate District 22 seat open, Biggs was unopposed in both the August 24 Republican primary, winning with 25,792 votes, and the November 2 general election, winning with 59,933 votes.

In 2012, redistricted to District 12, and with incumbent Republican Senator John B. Nelson redistricted to District 13, Biggs was unopposed in both the August 28 Republican primary, winning with 19,844 votes, and the November 6 general election, winning with 63,812 votes.

== U.S. House of Representatives (2017-present) ==
=== Elections ===
==== 2016 ====
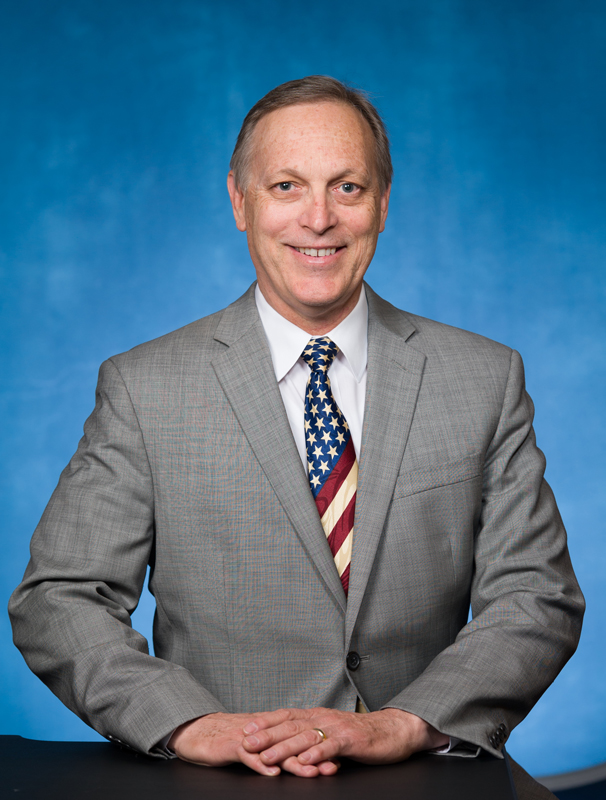
Biggs portrait during 115th Congress

In 2016, Biggs ran for Congress from the 5th District to replace retiring Representative Matt Salmon. He led the field in the four-way Republican primary, finishing nine votes ahead of his nearest opponent, businesswoman Christine Jones. A recanvass boosted Biggs's margin to 16 votes, and an automatic recount confirmed him as the nominee by 27 votes. His primary victory virtually assured him of being the next representative from the district; the 5th and its predecessors have been in Republican hands for all but one term since 1953.

Biggs defeated Democratic nominee Talia Fuentes, 64.1% to 35.9%. He was not required to give up his state senate seat under Arizona's resign-to-run laws, since he was in the last year of what would have been his final term in the chamber.

==== 2018 ====
Biggs was re-elected in 2018 defeating his democratic opponent.

==== 2020 ====
Biggs was re-elected in 2018 defeating his democratic opponent.

==== 2022 ====
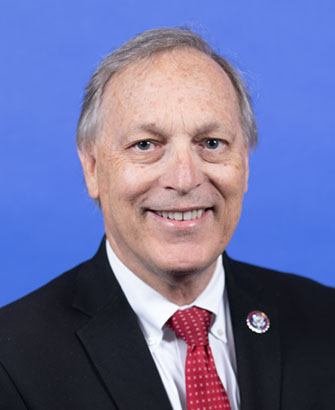
Biggs portrait during 118th Congress

Biggs was re-elected in 2018 defeating his democratic opponent.

==== 2024 ====
Biggs was re-elected in 2018 defeating his democratic opponent.

=== Tenure ===
Biggs is a member of the Congressional Western Caucus and the Republican Study Committee. In September 2019, he replaced Mark Meadows as chair of the Freedom Caucus.

Biggs voted for the Tax Cuts and Jobs Act of 2017. After the vote, he said the bill would "provide much-needed economic relief" to American citizens and businesses.

On March 4, 2020, Ken Buck and Biggs were the only two representatives to vote against an $8.3 billion emergency aid package meant to help the U.S. respond to the COVID-19 pandemic. In a statement, Biggs called the bill "larded-up" and "bloated." Ten days later, he voted against the larger Coronavirus Response Act, which passed the House, 363–40. Biggs helped lead the congressional resistance to federal COVID-19 pandemic aid as one of a handful of lawmakers who publicly opposed all four coronavirus relief packages passed in early 2020. Biggs said "the cure is proving worse than the disease" and asked "how much longer the American people will acquiesce to unconstitutional and crushing government action."

==== Contesting the 2020 presidential election ====
In 2020, Biggs joined Representative Paul Gosar in a video claiming there was widespread voter fraud in the 2020 presidential election. They claimed that Arizona's voting machines were faulty, and Biggs claimed that poll watchers were allowed to participate in vote tabulations in Detroit. They also demanded an audit of Maricopa County's vote count. Later, Biggs claimed that 10,000 Maricopa County voters were "disenfranchised" without giving evidence.

In December 2020, Biggs was among 126 House Republicans to sign an amicus brief for Texas v. Pennsylvania, an unsuccessful lawsuit that asked the Supreme Court to overturn election results from Georgia, Michigan, Pennsylvania, and Wisconsin, thereby denying Joe Biden from taking office as president.

Biggs also spoke at rallies promoting the "Stop the Steal" election conspiracy movement, and has claimed antifa was behind the January 6, 2021, storming of the U.S. Capitol. He denied that he was involved in planning the event and the riots as alleged by Rolling Stone and a video posted by Stop the Steal organizer Ali Alexander. In a deposition to the January 6 committee of the House of Representatives, Alexander testified that he spoke in person with Biggs before the events.

On October 7, 2021, Biggs again falsely claimed that "we don't know who won Arizona in the 2020 presidential election."

==== 2021 attack on the United States Capitol ====
During the 2021 attack on the U.S. Capitol, Biggs and all other House members were ushered to a secure location when the House chamber was cleared. A video of Biggs later surfaced in which he refused to wear a face mask during the Capitol attack, a violation of House rules at the time. Biggs subsequently voted to object to Arizona's and Pennsylvania's electoral votes that day, joining 138 other House Republicans.

On January 12, 2021, Biggs called on Representative Liz Cheney to resign from her leadership position in the Republican caucus after she voted in favor of Donald Trump's second impeachment.

In the aftermath of the events on January 6, Biggs's brothers William and Daniel wrote a letter to the editor of The Arizona Republic demanding their brother's removal from office. They wrote that Biggs is "at least partially to blame" for the Capitol storming. They also condemned his refusal to wear a mask in the secure location.

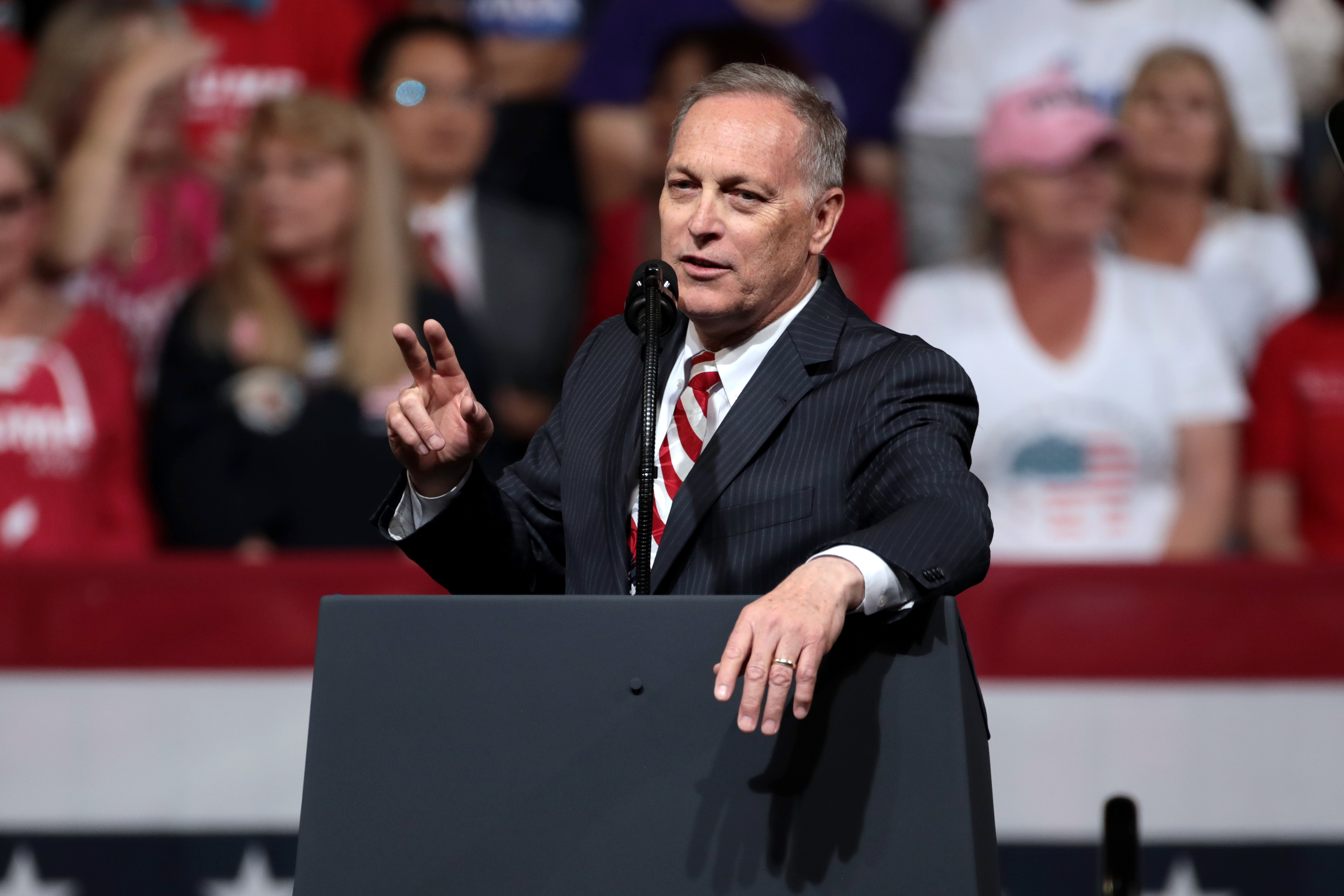
Biggs at a Trump Rally during the 2020 presidential election

Biggs speaking at a Trump rally in 2024

Biggs was one of 12 House Republicans to vote against H.R 1085 to award three Congressional Gold Medals to the U.S. Capitol Police who protected the Capitol on January 6. In June 2021, he and 20 other House Republicans voted against a similar resolution.

The House committee investigating the January 6 attack subpoenaed Biggs on May 12, 2022. During the committee hearing on June 21, 2022, Speaker of the Arizona House Russell Bowers testified that Biggs called him on the morning of January 6 asking him to sign a letter calling for decertification of the Arizona electors. On June 23, 2022, witnesses confirmed that Biggs had asked for a presidential pardon for his activities related to the certification of the vote.

==== Foreign and defense policy ====
Biggs was among 60 Republicans to oppose condemning Trump's action of withdrawing forces from Syria. He, Matt Gaetz, and a handful of other Republicans broke with their party and voted to end Saudi assistance in relation to the War in Yemen.

On March 19, 2021, Biggs voted against a House resolution to condemn the military coup in Myanmar. The resolution passed, 398–14, with one other member, Paul Gosar, voting present. Biggs called the violence "tragic" but added that "there is suffering everywhere in the world" and the U.S. "can't be the military police for the entire world," saying the resolution was a way to "put our foot in the door in Burma." The resolution was symbolic and did not call for use of force.

In June 2021, Biggs was one of 49 House Republicans to vote to repeal the Authorization for Use of Military Force Against Iraq Resolution of 2002.

In July 2021, Biggs voted against the bipartisan ALLIES Act, which would increase by 8,000 the number of special immigrant visas for Afghan allies of the U.S. military during its invasion of Afghanistan, while also reducing some application requirements that caused long application backlogs; the bill passed the House, 407–16.

In September 2021, Biggs was among 75 House Republicans to vote against the National Defense Authorization Act of 2022, which contains a provision that would require women to be drafted.

In 2022, Biggs voted against a bill to provide approximately $14 billion to the government of Ukraine.

In July 2022, Biggs was one of 18 Republicans to vote against ratifying Sweden's and Finland's applications for NATO membership.

In 2023, Biggs was among 47 Republicans to vote in favor of H.Con.Res. 21, which directed President Biden to remove U.S. troops from Syria within 180 days.

On March 19, 2024, Biggs voted NAY to House Resolution 149, which condemned the illegal abduction and forcible transfer of children from Ukraine to the Russian Federation. He was one of nine Republicans to do so.

==== 2023 Speaker election ====
Biggs ran in the Republican conference election for Speaker of the House of Representatives against Kevin McCarthy, then the House Minority Leader. McCarthy defeated him, 188 votes to 31. In the 2023 Speaker election, fellow Freedom Caucus member Paul Gosar nominated Biggs. He received 10 votes on the first ballot, which, alongside nine votes for other Republican candidates, was enough to necessitate a second ballot. This made the 2023 election the first to take more than one ballot since 1923. Biggs was not nominated for the second ballot, and voted for Jim Jordan. He did not receive any votes on ballots 2 through 13, but received two votes on the 14th ballot despite not being nominated.

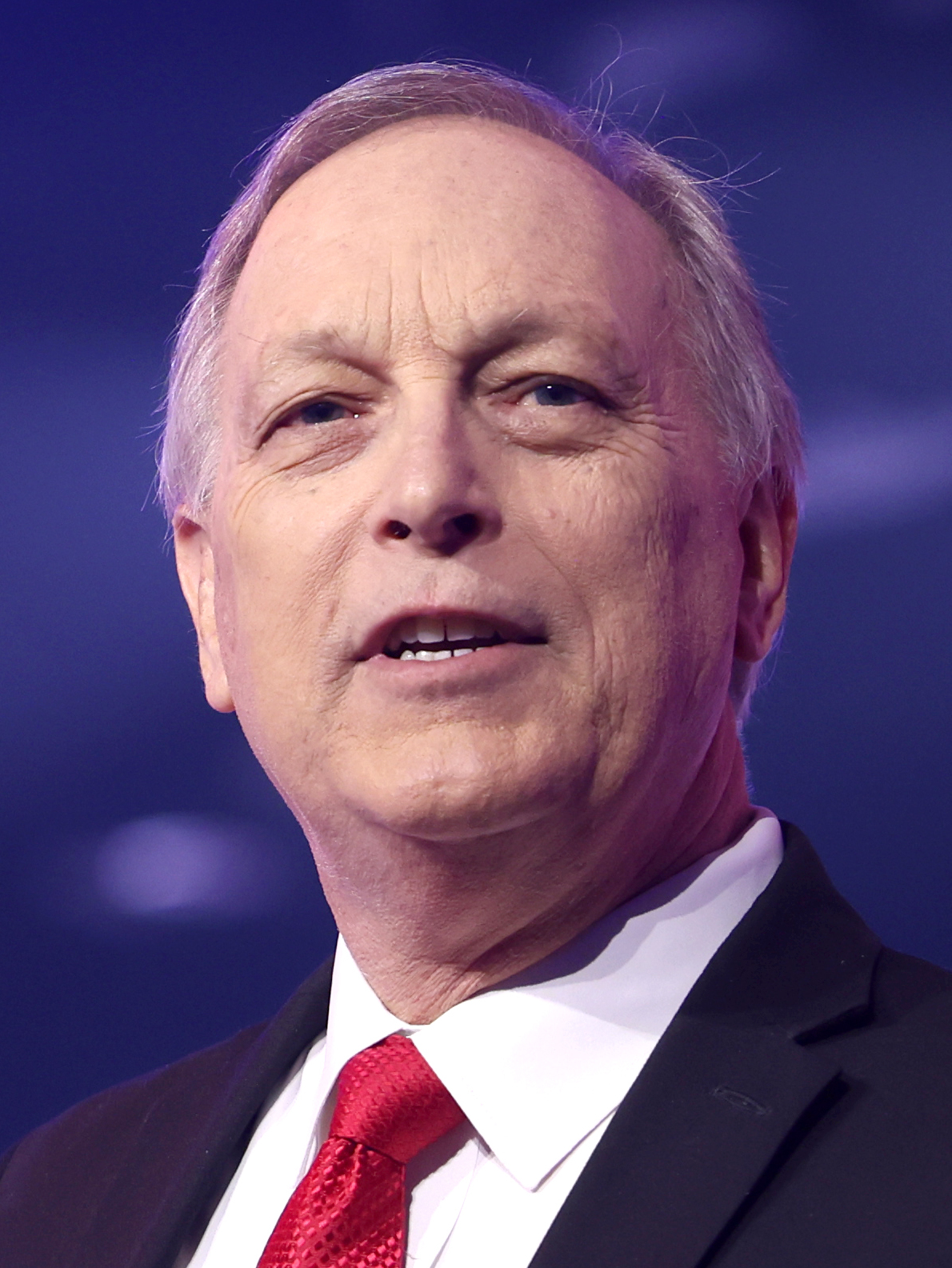
Biggs in 2025

==== Removal of Kevin McCarthy as Speaker of the House ====
On October 3, 2023, Biggs was one of eight Republicans who voted to remove Kevin McCarthy as Speaker of the House; during the debate which preceded the vote, Biggs had criticized McCarthy for allowing the passage of a temporary spending bill which did not include provisions to enhance border security.

=== Committee assignments ===
For the 119th Congress:

- Committee on Oversight and Accountability
  - Subcommittee on Federal Law Enforcement
  - Subcommittee on Military and Foreign Affairs
- Committee on the Judiciary
  - Subcommittee on Crime and Federal Government Surveillance (Chair)
  - Subcommittee on Immigration Integrity, Security, and Enforcement

=== Caucus memberships ===
- Freedom Caucus
- Congressional Western Caucus
- Congressional Taiwan Caucus

== 2026 Arizona gubernatorial campaign ==
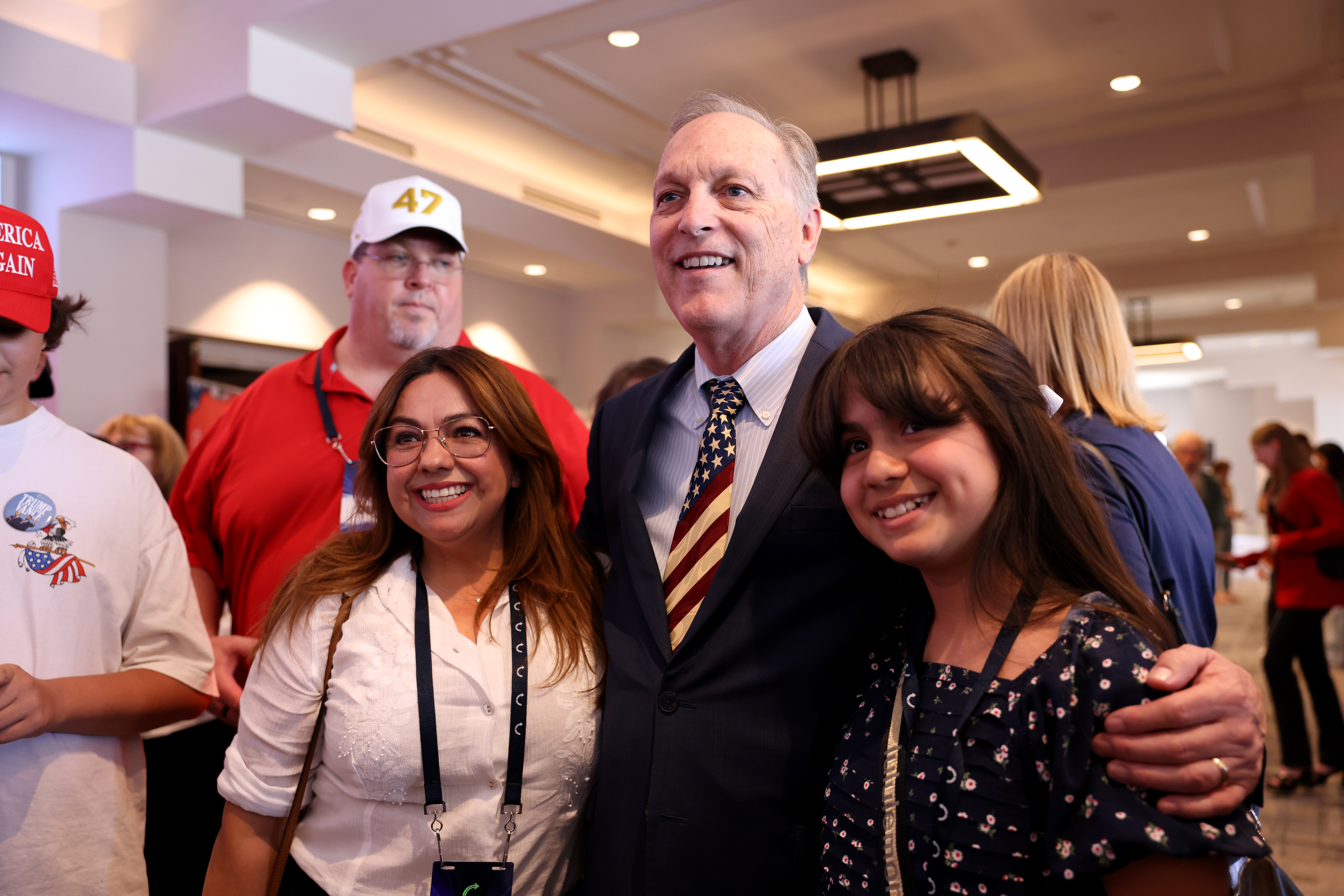
Biggs with Supporters in Surprise, Arizona.

In January 2025, Biggs announced his run for governor in the 2026 Arizona gubernatorial election. His opponents in the Republican primary included Karrin Taylor Robson (who later withdrew) and David Schweikert. In April 2025, Donald Trump co-endorsed both Biggs and Taylor Robson; Taylor Robinson later withdrew from the race. On July 21, 2026, Biggs won the Republican primary election.

He was defeated by Hobbs in the general election. (Note: The results of the 2026 Arizona gubernatorial election was not called until the day after election day with the results being called on November 4, 2026.)

2026 Arizona gubernatorial election results map by county

== Political positions ==
Biggs previously chaired the Freedom Caucus, which has been described as right-wing populist.

=== Abortion ===
Biggs is "opposed to all forms of elective abortion." He has argued in favor of abolishing the filibuster to make it easier to pass anti-abortion laws. He supported the 2022 overturning of Roe v. Wade, calling it "a major victory for the unborn."

=== Agriculture ===
Biggs opposes federal preemption of state and local laws regulating agricultural products sold across state lines, including those related to animal welfare. In March 2024, Biggs was among ten House Republicans who signed a letter to the House Committee on Agriculture opposing the inclusion of the Ending Agricultural Trade Suppression (EATS) Act in the 2024 farm bill. The EATS Act sought to invalidate certain state laws establishing minimum space requirements for animal products sold within the state, such as California's Proposition 12. The letter argued that the legislation would undermine states' rights and harm U.S. national security, while increasing the influence of foreign-owned corporations, especially those based in China, over the U.S. agricultural sector.

=== Article V convention ===
Biggs opposes a convention to propose amendments to the United States Constitution, also known as an Article V convention. During his tenure as Arizona Senate president, Biggs blocked a resolution calling for a convention. In 2015, Biggs published a book, The Con of the Con-Con, arguing against a convention.

=== Climate change ===
Biggs rejects the scientific consensus on climate change. Replying to a candidate survey from The Arizona Republic, Biggs wrote, "I do not believe climate change is occurring. I do not think that humans have a significant impact on climate. The federal government should stop regulating and stomping on our economy and freedoms in the name of a discredited theory." He submitted an amendment to the 2018 spending bill that would defund the National Climate Assessment and urged President Trump to withdraw from the Paris Accords. In February 2020, when Republican House Minority Leader Kevin McCarthy attempted to make a modest effort to gather the support of concerned young voters via a restrained approach to address climate change, Biggs and other hardline denialists objected. Biggs said: "People are like, 'Is this an official rollout? It can't be official. We didn't vote on it'."

While factions of the Republican Party were split on whether to continue climate change denial, conservative groups such as the Club for Growth and the Competitive Enterprise Institute supported continuation. In 2018, Biggs was the sole House member to receive a 100% rating from the CFG.

Biggs speaking at AmericaFest in 2025

Biggs in 2020

=== COVID-19 ===
Biggs opposes wearing masks to prevent the transmission of COVID-19, encouraging Arizonans not to wear them. In July 2020, he tweeted that people should not trust Anthony Fauci or Deborah Birx. He has called for the White House Coronavirus Task Force to be disbanded. During a major outbreak in the summer of 2020 in Arizona, Biggs questioned the hospitalization numbers and called Governor Doug Ducey's two-month lockdown a result of "hysteria" from "Democratic Leftists." In September 2020, Biggs posted a series of tweets supporting the use of hydroxychloroquine to prevent COVID-19.

=== Healthcare ===
In 2018, Biggs sponsored a bill "designed to let very sick patients request access to experimental medicines without government oversight," which passed the House, 267–149. Biggs said the bill was "not false hope; it is hope."

=== Juneteenth ===
In June 2021, Biggs was among 14 House Republicans who voted against passing legislation to establish June 19, or Juneteenth, as a federal holiday.

=== LGBTQ rights ===
Biggs is a former policy advisor to United Families International, a nonprofit that opposes same-sex marriage. Biggs condemned the Supreme Court ruling in Obergefell v. Hodges, which held that same-sex marriage bans violated the US constitution.

=== Net neutrality ===
Biggs has gone on record as opposing net neutrality, and favored FCC Chairman Ajit Pai's plan to end it. In a letter to his constituents, Biggs wrote, "we should allow the free market to expand the internet and its services."

=== Robert Mueller ===
On June 23, 2017, Biggs was one of three Republicans who called for the resignation of Robert Mueller, the prosecutor investigating Russian interference in the 2016 presidential election, on the grounds that Mueller could not conduct his investigation fairly because of events that happened when he was the director of the Federal Bureau of Investigation.

On March 19, 2018, Biggs renewed his call for Mueller to resign. On July 25, 2018, Biggs and nine other Republicans co-sponsored a resolution to impeach Deputy Attorney General Rod Rosenstein, who was Mueller's direct supervisor after the recusal of Attorney General Jeff Sessions.

On April 8, 2019, The Arizona Republic published an op-ed by Biggs on the initial findings of the Mueller investigation. In it, Biggs called the investigation "an illegitimate attack on the executive branch" and wrote that the findings "demonstrate the weakness of the initial premise to investigate Trump, his family and campaign staff." He blamed the investigation on "the media that fueled this bogus attempt to overthrow the will of the American voter." Biggs's op-ed was published well ahead of the release of Mueller's full report on April 18, 2019, and was most likely written in response to a four-page summary of the report by Attorney General William Barr released on March 24. After the publication of the full report, Biggs posted a video on Twitter declaring that there was "no basis for an obstruction [of justice] charge" against Trump, chastising the Democratic party for attempting to "undermine the POTUS."

=== Texting while driving ===
Biggs speaking at the 2017 Conservative Political Action Conference in Maryland

In 2017, Biggs used his powers as transportation chair and president of the Arizona State Senate to block a bill banning driving while texting for holders of a learning permit.

=== 9/11 Victims Compensation Fund ===
In 2019, Biggs was one of 11 House Republicans to oppose funding for the September 11 Victims Compensation Fund bill H.R. 1327. On July 12, 2019, the measure passed the House, 402–12.

=== Israel ===
Biggs voted to provide Israel with support following 2023 Hamas attack on Israel.

=== Antitrust ===
In 2022, Biggs was one of 39 Republicans to vote for the Merger Filing Fee Modernization Act of 2022, an antitrust package that would crack down on corporations for anti-competitive behavior.

=== 2023 United States debt-ceiling crisis ===
In April 2023, Biggs was one of four Republican representatives who voted against the proposed Limit, Save, Grow Act, which raised the debt ceiling while at the same time providing for spending cuts, saying that the proposed spending and deficit reductions contained in the bill were insufficient.

In June of the same year, Biggs was among the 71 Republicans who voted against final passage of the Fiscal Responsibility Act of 2023 in the House.

== Personal life ==
Biggs married Cindy Biggs in 1982. They have six children and eleven grandchildren. One of their daughters, Cosette, died at age 37 of cancer in 2025, leaving behind a husband and three children. Another daughter, Mylie, was the Republican nominee for the 14th legislative district of the Arizona Senate in 2026; she lost in the general election to Democrat Stephanie Walsh.

== Electoral history ==
Republican primary results for Arizona's 5th congressional district, 2016
Party	Candidate	Votes	%
Republican	Andy Biggs	25,240	29.5
Republican	Christine Jones	25,224	29.5
Republican	Don Stapley	17,745	20.7
Republican	Justin Olson	17,386	20.3
Total votes		85,595	100.0

Arizona’s 5th congressional district, 2016
Party	Candidate	Votes	%
Republican	Andy Biggs	205,184	64.1
Democratic	Talia Fuentes	114,940	35.9
Majority		90,244	28.2
Total votes		320,124	100.0
Republican hold			

Republican primary results for Arizona's 5th congressional district, 2018
Party	Candidate	Votes	%
Republican	Andy Biggs (incumbent)	86,418	100.0
Total votes		86,418	100.0

Arizona's 5th congressional district, 2018
Party	Candidate	Votes	%
Republican	Andy Biggs (incumbent)	186,037	59.4
Democratic	Joan Greene	127,027	40.6
Majority		59,010	18.8
Total votes		313,064	100.0
Republican hold			

Republican primary results for Arizona's 5th congressional district, 2020
Party	Candidate	Votes	%
Republican	Andy Biggs (incumbent)	104,888	99.6
Republican	Joe Vess (write-in)	465	0.4
Total votes		105,353	100.0

Arizona's 5th congressional district, 2020
Party	Candidate	Votes	%
Republican	Andy Biggs (incumbent)	262,414	58.9
Democratic	Joan Greene	183,171	41.1
Write-in		72	0.0
Total votes		445,657	100.0
Republican hold			

Republican primary results for Arizona's 5th congressional district, 2022
Party	Candidate	Votes	%
Republican	Andy Biggs (incumbent)	98,114	99.5
Write-in		456	0.5
Total votes		98,570	100.0

2022 Arizona's 5th congressional district election
Party	Candidate	Votes	%
Republican	Andy Biggs (incumbent)	182,464	56.7
Democratic	Javier Ramos	120,243	37.4
Independent	Clint Smith	18,851	5.9
Democratic	Debra Jo Borden (write-in)	32	0.0
Total votes		321,590	100.0
Republican hold			

Republican primary results for Arizona's 5th congressional district, 2024
Party	Candidate	Votes	%
Republican	Andy Biggs (incumbent)	91,820	100.0
Total votes		91,820	100.0

2024 Arizona's 5th congressional district election
Party	Candidate	Votes	%
Republican	Andy Biggs (incumbent)	255,628	60.4
Democratic	Katrina Schaffner	167,680	39.6
Total votes		423,308	100.0
Republican hold			

Republican primary results for Governor of Arizona, 2026
Party	Candidate	Votes	%
Republican	Andy Biggs	453,819	74.0
Republican	David Schweikert	88,284	14.4
Republican	Scott Neely	42,871	7.0
Republican	Ken Miceli	28,026	4.6
Total votes		613,000	100.0

2026 Arizona gubernatorial election results
Party	Candidate	Votes	%	±%
Democratic	Katie Hobbs (incumbent); John Giles	1,434,813	55.67	
Republican	Andy Biggs; Sine Kerr	1,094,388	42.46	
Green	Risa Lombardo; Lisa Castillo	24,644	0.96	
No Labels	Teri Ann Hourihan; Angela Harrolle Mohan	23,520	0.91	
Write-in		18	0.00	
Total votes		2,577,383	100.0	
Democratic hold				

== See also ==
- List of United States representatives from Arizona

== Published works ==
- Biggs, Andy (2015). The Con of the Con-Con. Nephi, UT: Free Man Press. ISBN 9780984222315.
- Biggs, Andy (2011). The Doctrine of Liberty: Insights From The Book Of Mormon. Nephi, UT: Free Man Press. ISBN 9780984222308.

Political offices
Preceded by Steve Pierce	President of the Arizona Senate; 2013–2017	Succeeded by Steve Yarbrough
U.S. House of Representatives
Preceded by Matt Salmon	Member of the U.S. House of Representatives from Arizona's 5th congressional district 2017–present	Incumbent
Party political offices
Preceded by Mark Meadows	Chair of the House Freedom Caucus; 2019–2022	Succeeded by Scott Perry
Preceded by Kari Lake	Republican nominee for Governor of Arizona; 2026	Most recent
U.S. order of precedence (ceremonial)
Preceded by Jack Bergman	United States representatives by seniority 159th	Succeeded by Salud Carbajal
