= Stacey Travers =

American politician, scientist, and military veteran

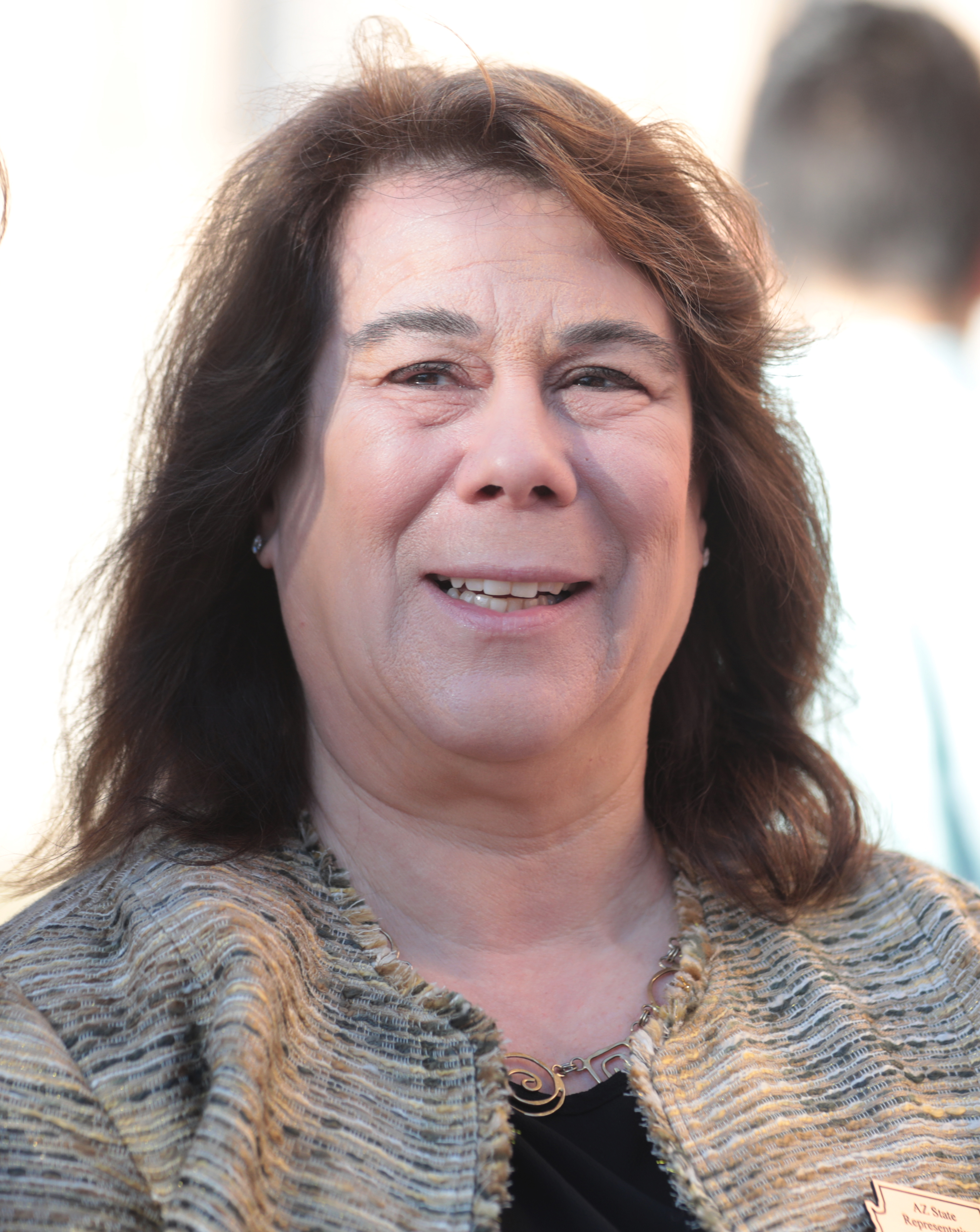

Member of the Arizona House of Representatives from the 12th district
- Incumbent
- Assumed office January 9, 2023 Serving with Patty Contreras
- Preceded by: Jake Hoffman

Personal details
- Party: Democratic
- Education: University of Arizona

Anastasia "Stacey" Travers is an American politician, scientist, and U.S. Army veteran. She is a Democratic member of the Arizona House of Representatives elected to represent District 12 in 2022.

== Personal life ==
Travers was born in Athens to a U.S. military father and a Greek mother. She served in the U.S. Army as a Russian Intelligence Interceptor. She completed a B.S. in geosciences from the University of Arizona. She conducted postgraduate studies at the University of Oxford. She worked with disabled veterans and the unsheltered in the United Kingdom. When she returned to the United States, she worked in West Los Angeles and was a legislative liaison in Sacramento, California. Travers worked for AMVETS and advocated for veteran women's issues, the homeless, and disabled. She also advocated for the Pacific branch of the National Home for Disabled Veteran Soldiers. Travers has two children.

== Political career ==
Travers was elected to the Arizona House of Representatives in 2022 as a Democrat. She serves on the military affairs and public safety and the natural resources energy and water committees. During her first term, she gained attention for attempting to legislate to remove a clerical exemption from Arizonan law that stated that members of the clergy could not be compelled to reveal what a penitent said during confession, in relation to child abuse cases. She claimed she brought it forward after a request from members of The Church of Jesus Christ of Latter Day Saints (LDS Church). The Republican-run House Judiciary Committee blocked Travers' bill by refusing to hear it. In 2026, she attempted to bring in a similar bill, after the State of Washington brought a similar bill into law. Congressman Andy Biggs, himself a member of the LDS Church, called Travers' bill "A terrible attack on Catholics in Arizona...".
