= Stephanie Walsh =

American politician

Member-elect of the Arizona Senate from the 14th district
- Assuming office January 2027
- Succeeding: Warren Petersen

Personal details
- Born: Idaho Falls, Idaho
- Party: Democratic
- Education: University of Idaho (BS)

Stephanie Stanger Walsh is an American engineer and politician. A member of the Democratic Party, she is the member-elect for the 14th district of the Arizona Senate.

== Early life and career ==
Walsh is a native of Idaho Falls, Idaho. She graduated from the University of Idaho with a Bachelor of Science in mechanical engineering and is a professional engineer.

Walsh founded Idaho Falls-based engineering firm Walsh Engineering Services in 2005 and retired in 2019. She serves as president of nonprofit organization the Idaho Sustainability and Energy Coalition and heads advocacy group the Idaho Geothermal Action Consortium.

== Arizona Senate ==
Walsh faced Mylie Biggs, the then-26-year-old daughter of Andy Biggs, in the 2026 Arizona Senate election. Biggs was criticized for residing at her parents' home during the campaign and for saying "Honestly, I don’t know if I would vote for any female. I don’t know if a female should be in office" during a podcast interview in 2024. Walsh campaigned on her career experience in energy, noting Biggs' age and lack of experience. She defeated Biggs in the general election.
