= John Kavanagh (Arizona politician) =

American politician (born 1950)

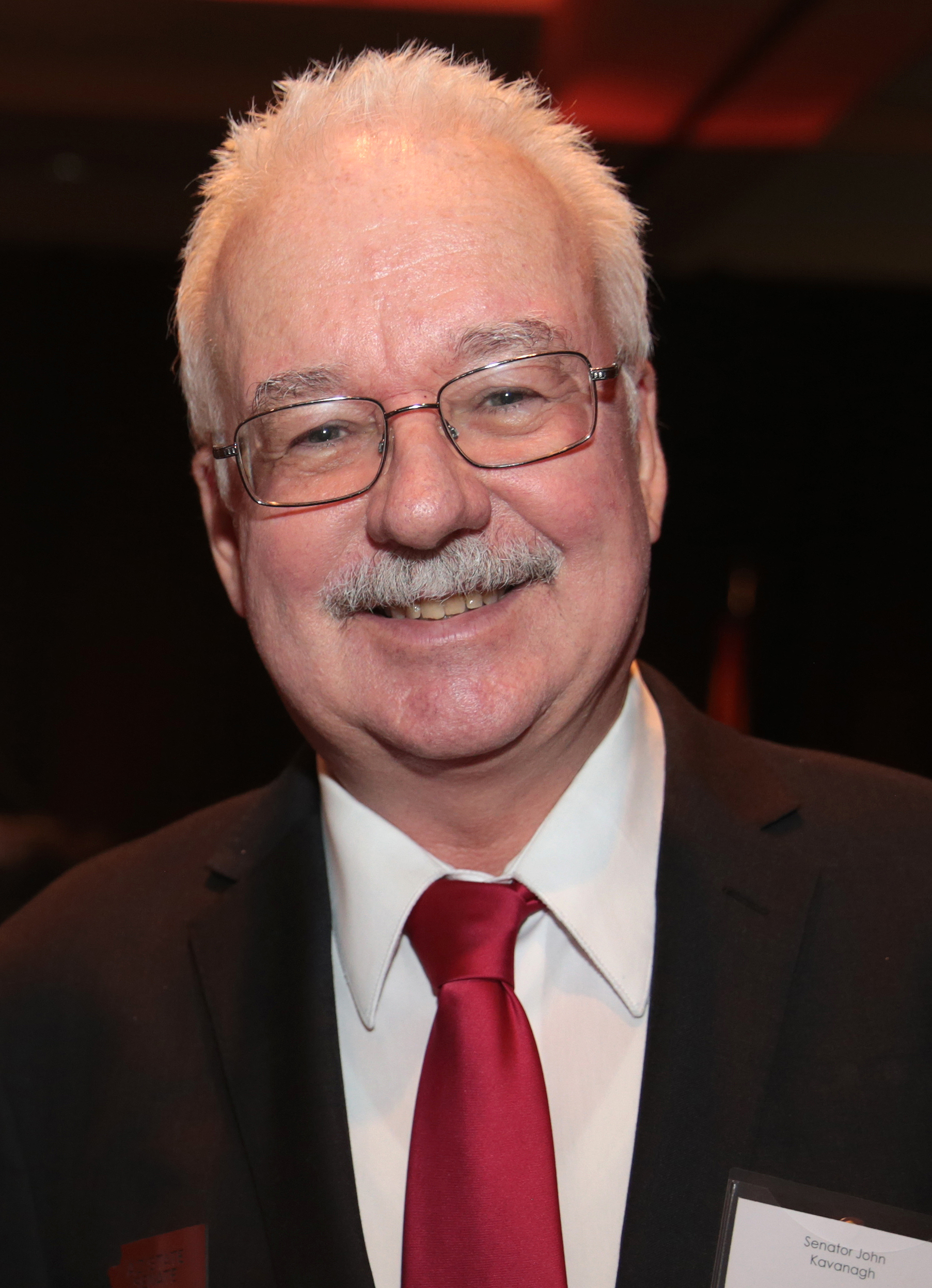
- Kavanagh in 2018

Majority Leader of the Arizona Senate
- Incumbent
- Assumed office June 27, 2025
- Preceded by: Janae Shamp

President pro tempore of the Arizona Senate
- In office January 8, 2018 – January 14, 2019
- Preceded by: Debbie Lesko
- Succeeded by: Eddie Farnsworth

Member of the Arizona Senate
- Incumbent
- Assumed office January 9, 2023
- Preceded by: Michelle Ugenti-Rita
- Constituency: 3rd district
- In office January 15, 2015 – January 14, 2019
- Preceded by: Michele Reagan
- Succeeded by: Michelle Ugenti-Rita
- Constituency: 23rd district

Member of the Arizona House of Representatives
- In office January 14, 2019 – January 9, 2023
- Preceded by: Michelle Ugenti-Rita
- Succeeded by: Michele Pena
- Constituency: 23rd district
- In office January 8, 2007 – January 15, 2015
- Preceded by: Colette Rosati
- Succeeded by: Frank Pratt
- Constituency: 8th district (2007–2013); 23rd district (2013–2015)

Personal details
- Born: June 5, 1950 (age 76) New York City, New York, U.S.
- Party: Republican
- Spouse: Linda Kavanagh
- Education: New York University (BA); St. John's University, New York (MA); Rutgers University, Newark (PhD)

John Kavanagh (born June 5, 1950) is an American politician who has served in both houses of the Arizona State Legislature since 2007. He is currently representing the 3rd legislative district in the Arizona Senate since 2023.

Kavanagh represented District 23 in the Arizona House of Representatives representing from 2013 to 2015, District 8 from 2007 to 2013, and District 23 from 2019 to 2023. He was a police officer with the Port Authority of New York and New Jersey and retired as a detective sergeant, after 20 years of service. He is currently a professor of criminal justice at Scottsdale Community College (AZ), where he is Program Director of the Administration of Justice Studies and Forensic Science Programs.

== Education and early life ==
The grandson of Irish and German immigrants who came to Ellis Island in the early 20th century, he was born in Queens, New York.

John Kavanagh earned his BA in liberal arts from New York University, his MA in government from St. John's University, and his PhD in criminal justice from Rutgers University.

Kavanagh was a Port Authority Police Officer for 20 years and retired as a detective sergeant. He served at Kennedy Airport, where he was also on the crash crew, the Port Authority Bus Terminal in the Times Square area of New York City and also taught in the police academy. Upon retiring from the Port Authority Police, Kavanagh moved to Fountain Hills, Arizona and taught as an adjunct and later full-time instructor at Arizona State University for several years and then was a professor of criminal justice and program director at Scottsdale Community for 15 years. He retired from SCC in 2017 but teaches there as an adjunct.

== Elections ==
- 2014 Elected to the Arizona State Senate in District 23, defeating Democrat Paula Pennypacker, and replacing Sen. Michele Reagan, who was elevated to Secretary of State in the same election.
- 2012 Redistricted to District 23 alongside incumbent Representative Michelle Ugenti, and with incumbent Republican Representatives John Fillmore running for Arizona Senate and Frank Pratt redistricted to District 8, Kavanagh ran alongside Representative Ugenti in the three-way August 28, 2012 Republican Primary; Kavanagh placed first with 20,922 votes and Representative Ugenti placed second; they were unopposed for the November 6, 2012 General election, where Representative Ugenti took the first seat and Kavanagh took the second seat with 68,827 votes.
- 2010 With Representative Reagan running for Arizona Senate and leaving a District 8 seat open, Kavanagh ran in the six-way August 24, 2010 Republican Primary and placed first with 18,081 votes; in the three-way November 2, 2010 General election Kavanagh took the first seat with 43,867 votes and fellow Republican nominee Michelle Ugenti took the second seat ahead of Democratic nominee John Kriekard.
- 2008 Kavanagh and Representative Reagan were unopposed for the September 2, 2008 Republican Primary; Representative Reagan placed first and Kavanagh placed second with 14,532 votes; in the three-way November 2, 2010 General election, Representative Reagan took the first seat and Kavanagh took the second seat with 50,507 votes ahead of Democratic nominee Stephanie Rimmer.
- 2006 When incumbent Republican Representative Colette Rosati ran for Arizona Senate and left a District 8 seat open, Kavanagh ran in the five-way September 12, 2006 Republican Primary, taking second place with 7,979 votes; in the four-way November 7, 2006 General election, Representative Michele Reagan took the first seat and Kavanagh took the second seat with 35,260 ahead of Democratic nominees Stephanie Rimmer and H. William Sandberg.
- 2000-2006 Was appointed to fill an open two-year term on the Fountain Hills Town Council and then was elected to another four-year term.
- 1978-1981 Elected twice to the Lafayette, New Jersey Township Committee.

== Tenure in the legislature ==
In February 2019, Kavanagh belittled a humanist invocation made by Representative Athena Salman, an atheist legislator, on the floor of the Arizona House of Representatives. In the invocation, Salman asked legislators to consider the "wonders of the universe" and the diversity of life on an "insignificant planet in an insignificant galaxy" and made reference to a deity. Kavanagh responded by mocking Salman's statement, prompting Salman and fellow Democrats to lodge a protest against Kavanagh and state that he had exhibited "behavior unbecoming of a member" in violation of the chamber's rules. Kavanaugh contended that Salman had "hijacking of the prayer and turning it into a secular commercial" and acted "to restore God to the prayer."

Kavanagh sponsored legislation to limit disability access lawsuits against businesses based on the Arizonans with Disabilities Act. The bill, in its amended form, gave businesses a "cure period" during which they can correct violations and avoid litigation. Disability rights groups opposed the legislation.

Kavanagh sponsored legislation granting immunity from civil liability to people who break into locked vehicles to rescue children and pets from overheating on hot days; the bill passed the Senate on a 35–20 vote, and then a 20–7 vote, before being approved by the governor.

In 2022, Kavanagh was awarded with the Legislator of the Year award from the Arizona Department of the American Legion for his commitment to veterans. Kavanagh has been lauded for his sponsorship and work to pass House Bill 2320, a new law providing a property tax exemption benefitting veterans’ service organizations. HB 2320 allows property and buildings leased to, or owned by, a veterans’ service organization to qualify for property tax exemption as long the property is used primarily for veterans-related operations and the economic benefit is passed on entirely to the organization. HB 2320 was signed into law by Gov. Doug Ducey on May 27. “We all owe a great debt of gratitude to America’s veterans, without whom our nation could not be free,” said Kavanagh. “This tax savings for veterans is well earned and well deserved.”

Kavanagh was also awarded in 2022 with the Humane Legislator Award For Commitment To Animal Protection from the Humane Society in recognition of animal protection legislation he sponsored that year. It was the third time he had been presented with the honor. HB2324 protects children from attending illegal animal fights. The bill received wide bipartisan support from legislators and was signed into law by the governor on April 14. “Animal fighting is a viscous act,” said Representative Kavanagh. “It’s bad enough for adults watch these fights, but it can be scarring to a child and could groom attitudes of a new generation to view such gruesome behavior as acceptable.” HB2626 requires dogs and cats to be scanned for microchip identification and to make reasonable effort to contact the animal’s owner. The bill received strong bipartisan support from legislators and was signed into law by the governor on April 29. “This law will help reunite dogs and cats with their owners,” Kavanagh said. “With this one small act to scan lost, stray, or deceased animals for a microchip, we can reduce the number of animals who would otherwise be sent to local shelters or anonymously cremated.”

Kavanagh made news for his controversial comment on inmate Regan Clarine being asked to treat her C-section with sugar. He reportedly commented "That doesn't sound like a true allegation. That sounds ridiculous. Prisoners have 24/7 to think of allegations and write letters. I'm not saying that some of them can't have a basis in fact, but you gotta take them with a grain of salt, or, in the case of the hospital, maybe a grain of sugar."

Kavanagh was the lead sponsor of a bill to remove 11 phrases from Arizona's 9/11 Memorial. The 11 phrases were among 54 phrases chosen by the design committee from a selection of Arizona newspaper clippings shortly after the September 11 attack. Kavanagh specifically wanted the phrases "09 15 01 Balbir Singh Sodhi, a Sikh, murdered in Mesa"; "You don't win battles of terrorism with more battles" and "Foreign-born Americans afraid" to be removed from the memorial. The first phrase referenced a Sikh man who was murdered in a hate crime in Arizona by a white supremacist four days after the September 11, 2001 attacks. Kavanagh acknowledged that "he did only a cursory Internet search" on Sodhi's murder, but contended that Sodhi was "not a victim of 9/11" and asserted that "It's part of a myth that, following 9/11, Americans went into a xenophobic rage against foreigners. That's not true. America's reaction towards foreigners was commendable." After advocacy by Sikh American organizations and meeting with Balbir Singh’s family, then Rep. John Kavanagh agreed to a plan that would put Singh Sodhi’s name back on the memorial even if Gov. Jan Brewer signed his bill into law… But he said the new wording describing Singh Sodhi’s murder would be more specific, dropping the phrase “fear of foreigners” and replacing it with “First backlash hate-crime murder victim.” Singh Sodhi, a Sikh and Mesa gas station owner, was gunned down four days after the Sept. 11 terrorist attacks. His killer mistook him for an Arab. “I apologized for dredging up the sorrow once again. I apologized for any misunderstanding,” Kavanagh said. Rana Singh Sodhi, Balbir Singh Sodhi's brother commented, "He is also agreeing it's not right." Rana Singh Sodhi said he appreciates Kavanagh's apology and his offer to correct the error if Brewer signs the bill. "I am so comfortable. When I met him, he apologized. I have no revenge," Rana Singh Sodhi said. The bill passed the state legislature on party-line votes, but was vetoed by Governor Jan Brewer.

In 2016, Kavanagh sponsored a bill to make it a criminal offense for any person to record police officers within twenty feet, even in a public space. Legal experts stated that the proposal was facially unconstitutional, and the American Civil Liberties Union criticized the proposal. After coming under criticism, Kavanagh withdrew the bill before it could receive a hearing.

Kavanagh sponsored an anti-transgender "bathroom bill" to block municipalities from requiring private businesses to allow transgender people to use restrooms that match their gender identities; Kavanagh introduced the bill after the City of Phoenix extended its anti-discrimination ordinance to cover LGBT discrimination.

In March 2021, as the Republican Party pursued a sweeping effort to suppress voting access nationwide following false claims of widespread voter fraud in the 2020 United States presidential election, Kavanagh justified voting restrictions with the statement: "Everybody shouldn’t be voting...Quantity is important, but we have to look at the quality of votes, as well."

In 2021, Kavanagh sponsored legislation that would prohibit oversight boards of police departments unless those boards were two-thirds sworn police officers. The bill aimed to block the City of Phoenix's newly established Office of Accountability and Transparency, a civilian police oversight agency, from overseeing police misconduct investigations. Gov. Doug Ducey signed HB 2567 into law in 2021 with it going into effect the summer of 2021.

In 2022, Kavanagh sponsored legislation that would require the publication of the names and addresses of all eligible voters in elections.

Kavanagh published a book about the inner workings of the state legislature in 2025 titled State Legislatures: An Owner's Manual

Arizona Senate
Preceded by Debbie Lesko	President pro tempore of the Arizona Senate; 2018–2019	Succeeded by Eddie Farnsworth
Preceded by Janae Shamp	Majority Leader of the Arizona Senate; 2025–present	Incumbent
