= Patty Contreras =

American politician

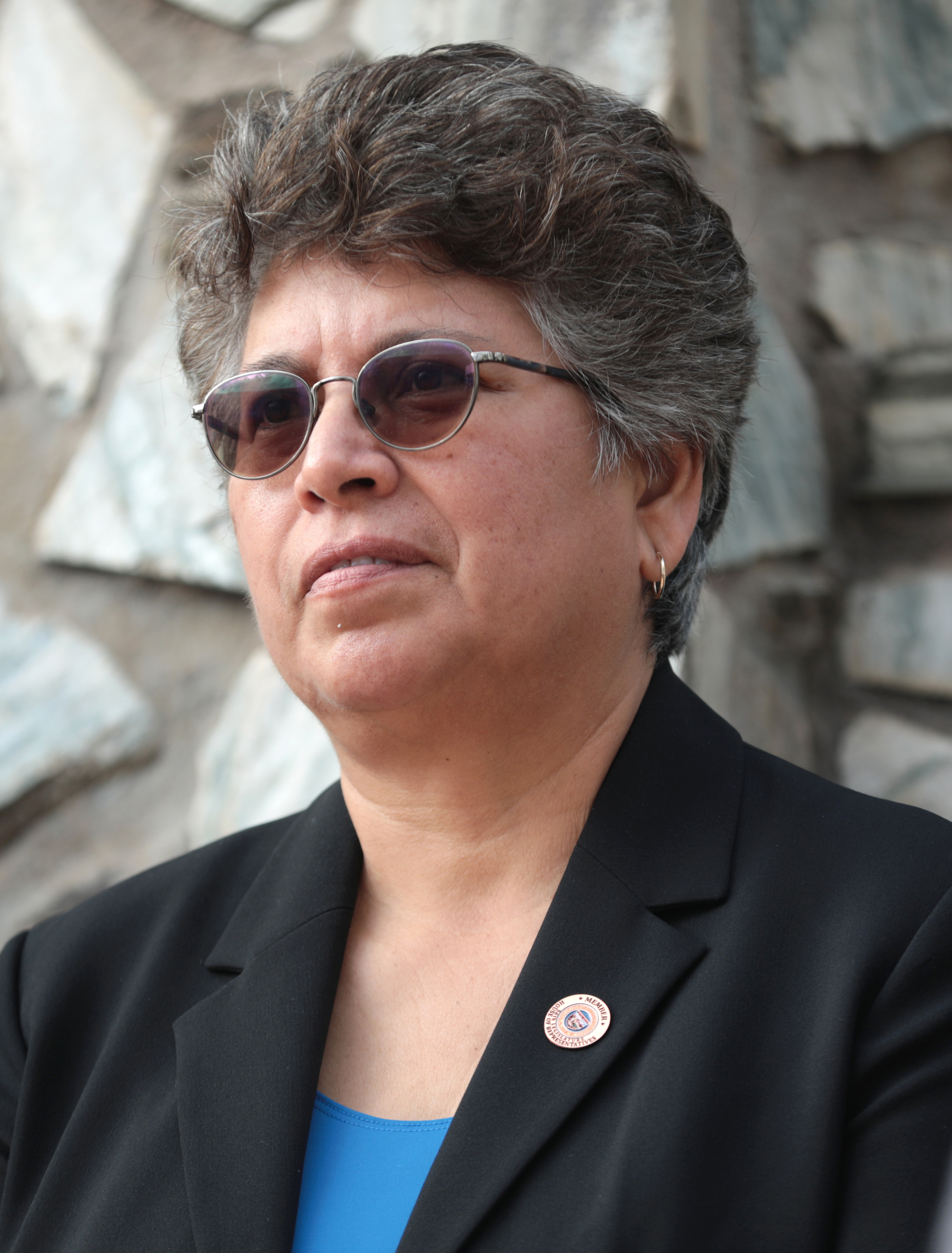

Member of the Arizona House of Representatives from the 12th district
- Incumbent
- Assumed office January 9, 2023 Serving with Stacey Travers
- Preceded by: Travis Grantham
- Succeeded by: Armando Montero (elect)

Personal details
- Party: Democratic

Patty Contreras is an American politician. She is a Democratic member of the Arizona House of Representatives elected to represent District 12 in 2022. She is one of the first out lesbians elected to the Arizona House of Representatives. Contreras was serves on the health and human services and transportation and infrastructure committees. She retired from the city of Phoenix, Arizona, where she worked for 31.5 years as a program manager in human services and parks and recreation.
