= Michelle Ugenti-Rita =

American politician (born 1980)

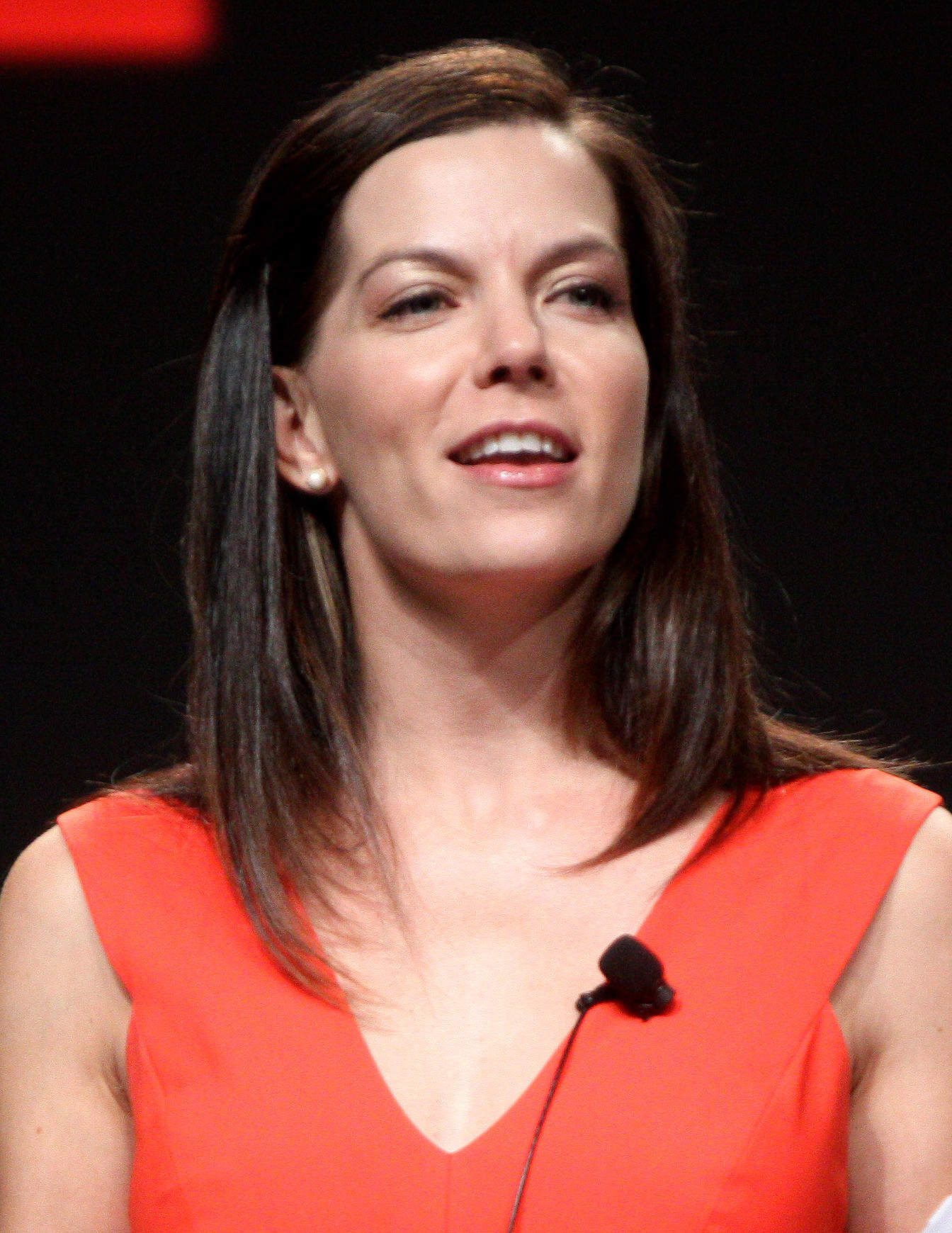
- Ugenti in 2012

Member of the Arizona Senate from the 23rd district
- In office January 14, 2019 – January 9, 2023
- Preceded by: John Kavanagh
- Succeeded by: Brian Fernandez

Member of the Arizona House of Representatives
- In office January 14, 2013 – January 14, 2019
- Preceded by: Michele Reagan
- Succeeded by: John Kavanagh
- Constituency: 8th district (2011–2013); 23rd district (2013–2019)

Personal details
- Born: June 28, 1980 (age 46) Scottsdale, Arizona, U.S.
- Party: Republican
- Education: Arizona State University, Tempe (BA)
- Website: Official website

Michelle Ugenti-Rita (born June 28, 1980) is an American politician and a former Republican member of the Arizona State Senate representing District 23 from 2019 to 2023. She previously served in the Arizona House of Representatives from 2013 to 2019. Ugenti served consecutively from January 10, 2011 until January 14, 2013 in the District 8 seat. She was a candidate for Secretary of State of Arizona in the 2022 election, but lost in the Republican primary. In 2024, she ran for a seat on the Maricopa County Board of Supervisors but also lost in the Republican primary.

== Education ==
She attended Desert Mountain High School. Ugenti graduated from Arizona State University in 2003 with a degree in business administration.

== Career ==
In 2017, Ugenti was the only Republican to oppose a "Blue Lives Matter" bill that toughens penalties for assaulting off-duty police.

In January 2019, she sponsored legislation which would prohibit voters who received early vote ballots from casting those votes at polling places before or on election day (they would only be allowed to cast them through mail). Election officials from both parties, as well as voting rights advocates, opposed the legislation, saying that it solves no problem and with some saying it amounted to voter suppression. In 2018, about 228,000 voters had cast their early vote ballots on election day itself, but would be prohibited from doing so under the proposed law.

Ugenti has sponsored a number of bills making it harder to put ballot initiatives up to voters.

In 2021, she supported legislation that would require voters in Arizona who vote by mail to include identification paperwork along with their ballots. She also supported legislation that would purge registered voters from early voting vote rolls if they did not use early voting in two consecutive elections. Initially a supporter of the 2021 Maricopa County presidential ballot audit, she withdrew her support in July, 2021.

She played a prominent role in Arizona's #MeToo movement when she accused fellow legislator Don Shooter of sexual harassment in 2017 leading to his expulsion from the Arizona House of Representatives. In a turn of events, Ugenti-Rita was herself accused of sexual misconduct when a female lobbyist accused her and her then fiancé of pressuring her into a threesome.

In her 2026 campaign for a seat on the Scottsdale City Council, she has stated that "I am a lifelong Republican running for City Council,". Scottsdale City Council is a nonpartisan position.

== Elections ==
- 2010 With incumbent Democratic Representative David Bradley running for the Arizona Senate, Ugenti and Republican incumbent John Kavanagh ran in the six-way District 8 Primary; Ugenti placing second with 9,581 votes. In the November 2 General election, Kavanagh took the first seat, and Ugenti took the second seat with 38,055 votes against Democrat John Kriekard.
- 2012 Redistricted to District 23, and with incumbent Republican Representatives John Fillmore running for Arizona Senate and Frank Pratt redistricted to District 8, Ugenti ran in the three-way August 28, Republican Primary; Kavanagh placed first, and Ugenti placed second with 18,106 votes. Ugenti and Kavanagh were unopposed for the November 6, 2012 General election, with Ugenti taking the first seat with 68,827 votes.
- 2014 Michelle Ugenti and Jay Lawrence defeated Effie Carlson and Bob Littlefield in the Republican primary and were unchallenged in the general election.
- 2016 Ugenti and Jay Lawrence were unopposed in the Republican primary. They defeated Democrat Tammy Caputi on November 8. Ugenti was the top vote getter in the election with 69,758 votes.
- 2018 Ugenti-Rita defeated two Republican challengers, taking 41.4% of the vote, in the 2018 primary. She defeated Democratic challenger Daria Lohman and Independent Christopher Leone with 57.1% of the vote.
