= Michele Reagan =

American politician (born 1969)

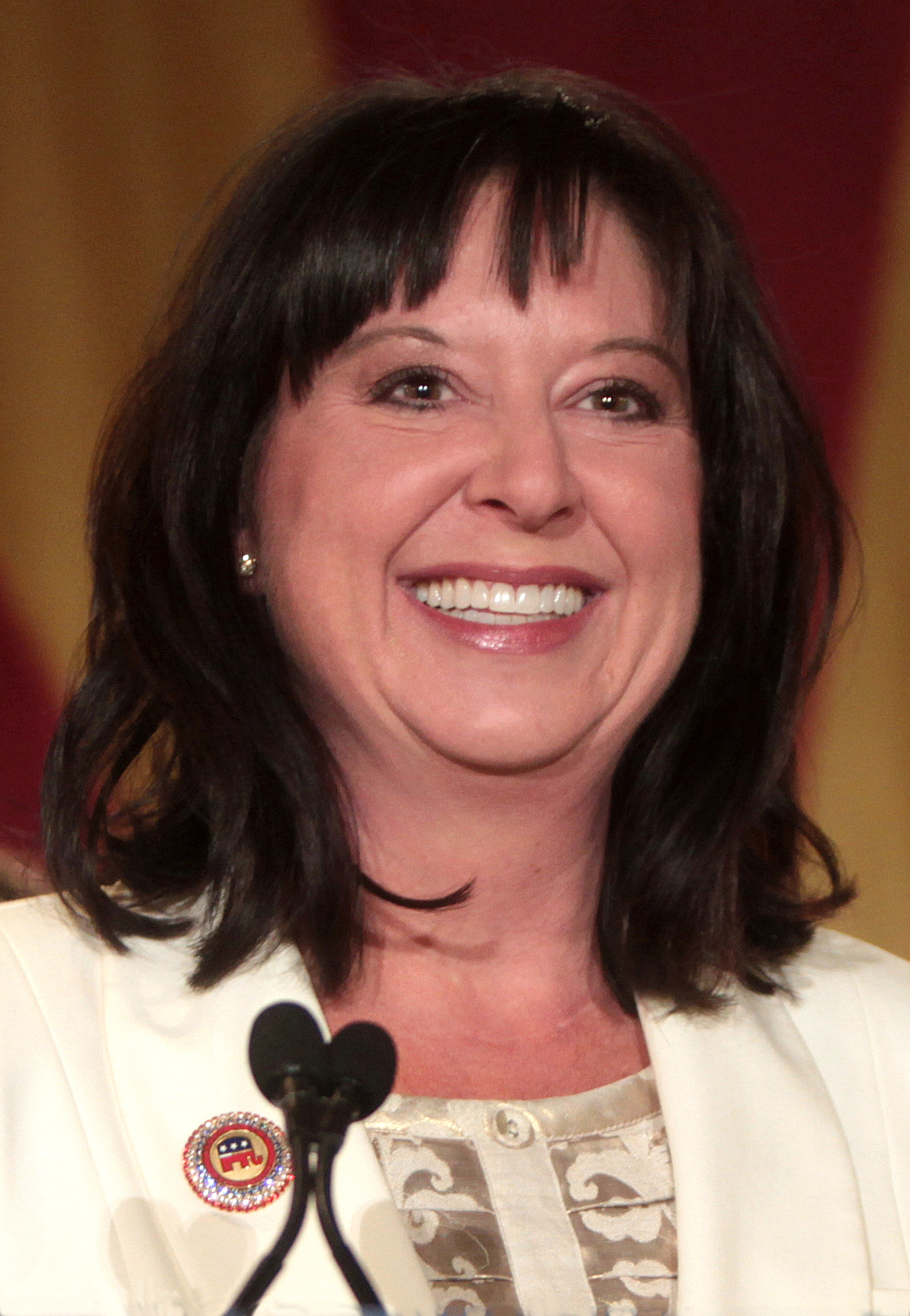
- Reagan in 2014

20th Secretary of State of Arizona
- In office January 5, 2015 – January 7, 2019
- Governor: Doug Ducey
- Preceded by: Ken Bennett
- Succeeded by: Katie Hobbs

Member of the Arizona Senate from the 23rd district
- In office January 14, 2013 – January 12, 2015
- Preceded by: Steve Smith
- Succeeded by: John Kavanagh

Member of the Arizona Senate from the 8th district
- In office January 3, 2011 – January 3, 2013
- Preceded by: Carolyn Allen
- Succeeded by: Barbara McGuire

Member of the Arizona House of Representatives from the 8th district
- In office January 13, 2003 – January 3, 2011 Serving with Colette Rosati, John Kavanagh
- Preceded by: Bobby Lugo; Mark Maiorana
- Succeeded by: John Kavanagh; Michelle Ugenti-Rita

Personal details
- Born: October 13, 1969 (age 56) Rockford, Illinois, U.S.
- Party: Republican
- Spouse: David
- Education: Illinois State University (BA)

Michele Reagan (born October 13, 1969) is an American Republican politician who served as the 20th Arizona Secretary of State, from 2015 to 2019. She is currently a Justice of the Peace for the Maricopa County McDowell Mountain Precinct.

== Early life ==
A native of Rockford, Illinois, Reagan first moved to Arizona in 1991 with her family and opened a Fastsigns.

Reagan graduated from Illinois State University and was named by the Aspen Institute to its Rodel Fellowship.

== Career ==
Reagan was first elected to the Arizona State House in 2002. She was first elected to the Arizona State Senate in 2010. Michele Reagan was elected to serve as Arizona's 20th Secretary of State in 2014.

Reagan voted in support of a bill that was referred as the "birther bill" in 2011, which required candidates to prove their citizenship to the secretary of state of Arizona, and bill 1062, a controversial religious freedom bill that was vetoed by Governor Jan Brewer.

In March 2017, State Senator Steve Montenegro announced a primary challenge to Michele Reagan citing what he described as her "long and liberal voting record." Later, however, Montenegro announced he would run for Congress instead of Secretary of State. Reagan ended up facing Steve Gaynor, a businessman, in the 2018 Republican primary. She lost the primary to Gaynor, who went on to lose the general election to Democrat Katie Hobbs.

In September 2019, Reagan was appointed by the Maricopa County Board of Supervisors as a Maricopa County Justice of the Peace for the McDowell Mountain Precinct. She succeeded her father, Michael Reagan who retired in July 2019.

== Political positions ==
Michele Reagan has been considered a moderate Republican. Reagan has been given an 80% conservative rating by the American Conservative Union. The Arizona chapter of Americans for Prosperity gave Reagan a 58% grade on conservative issues. She is fiscally conservative and voted against the Medicaid expansion, an online sales tax, and she voted to cut business taxes. On social issues, she has a mixed record. She supported same-sex marriage after it was legalized in Arizona.

=== Fiscal positions ===
She was given a score of 47% by the fiscally conservative Goldwater Institute in 2010. In 2010, Reagan was rated 38% by Americans for Prosperity and was rated 63% in 2014. The Arizona chapter of Americans for Prosperity gave her a grade of 58% in 2006 and 36% in 2008 based on "Positions on Conservative Issues." She was endorsed by the Arizona Chamber of Commerce. In 2012, the Goldwater Institute gave her a 71% on tax and budget issues. Reagan voted for the Medicaid expansion in Arizona in order to move the vote forward, but she voted against the Medicaid expansion during its last vote. She voted to reduce taxes for businesses and voted against imposing a sales tax on online sales. In 2012, she voted to expand requirements for unemployment benefits; in 2013, she voted to expand Medicaid eligibility. In 2014, she voted to regulate ride-sharing companies. She also voted to establish working requirements in order to receive welfare benefits.

=== Social positions ===
Michele Reagan has been given mixed ratings from organizations on both sides of the abortion rights issue. In 2012, Reagan was given a rating of 50% by NARAL/Arizona Right to Choose. In 2011 and 2009 respectively, she was given a 60% and 67% rating by Planned Parenthood. Her highest pro-choice score was 100% given by Planned Parenthood. The anti-abortion organization, Arizona Right to Life, gave her a 66% rating.

In 2011, Reagan voted against HB2416 which defined the abortion pill as a surgery, and voted against a bill prohibiting physicians assistants from providing an abortion pill; conversely, Reagan voted in favor of a bill making Planned Parenthood ineligible for The Working Poor Tax Credit. Reagan voted against banning abortions after 20 weeks of pregnancy. She also broke with her party and voted with Democrats against allowing employers to refuse to provide birth control coverage to employees.

On LGBT issues, she has a mixed record. She voted in favor of defining marriage as between one man and one woman, but she also voted against a bill that would have prevented same-sex couples from adopting. She was one of four Republicans in the state house to vote in favor of giving domestic partner rights to unmarried gay and straight couples. After same-sex marriage was legalized in Arizona, Reagan said that "[it] should be a proud day for Arizona as we celebrate equality." She was given a 100% rating by Equality Arizona which supports same-sex marriage and other LGBT rights. Representing the more conservative perspective, the Center for Arizona Policy, which opposes same-sex marriage and civil unions, gave Reagan a rating of 92% in 2012, her highest score, and a rating of 54% in 2008, her lowest score.

Reflecting her positions on gun issues, she was rated "A" by the NRA Political Victory Fund which advocates in favor of gun ownership rights. She voted to allow guns in certain public buildings, including on college campuses, and to legalize the display of a firearm for self-defense.

On education, Reagan voted against banning Common Core Standards. She also voted to end affirmative action in education.

She received a score of 38% in 2008 from Border Action Network, an organization supporting pro-immigration policies. Michele Reagan had also voted for SB1070, the controversial immigration law passed in Arizona meant to oppose illegal immigration and tighten enforcement. She joined Democrats to oppose a bill that would have defined and restricted Arizona citizenship. She voted to make English the official language of the state, and she voted against issuing separate birth certificates to non-citizens as well as against requiring proof of citizenship for some benefits. In 2018, Arizona faced a lawsuit over its requirement that voters show proof of citizenship to register to vote; as part of a settlement, Reagan agreed to a deal that requires proof of citizenship to vote in state elections but does not require proof of citizenship to vote in federal elections in accordance with federal law.

=== Elections ===
In 2016, Reagan proposed a bill in the Arizona Legislature ostensibly simplify elections, which would allow dark money groups to spend twice as much money on ballot measures as legally allowed, and allow nonprofit groups to spend more on elections. After the Trump administration requested that states provide voter information for a commission on voter fraud, Michele Reagan "said [on July 3] she is rejecting the Trump administration's request for extensive voter information, saying it isn't in the state's best interest."

In 2016 Reagan came under scrutiny for failing to mail out as many as a half million publicity pamphlets as required by Arizona law in connection with an election. The investigation concluded that the error "demonstrates poor or incompetent execution of the task, not a knowing omission of their duty." and assessed no criminal penalties.

== Personal life ==
Michele Reagan and her husband, David, currently reside in Scottsdale. She is a member of Valley Presbyterian Church in Paradise Valley, formerly a congregation of the Presbyterian Church (USA) and currently a congregation of ECO: A Covenant Order of Evangelical Presbyterians . She has no relation to the family of Ronald Reagan.

== Electoral history ==
Arizona House of Representatives District 8 Republican Primary Election, 2002
Party	Candidate	Votes	%
Republican	Michele Reagan	6,348	24.20
Republican	Colette Rosati	4,722	18.00
Republican	Ron McCullagh	4,554	17.36
Republican	Robert Ditchey	4,004	15.26
Republican	Scott Steingard	3,459	13.19
Republican	Kathleen Gillis	3,146	11.99

Arizona House of Representatives District 8 Election, 2002
Party	Candidate	Votes	%
Republican	Michele Reagan	33,251	39.68
Republican	Colette Rosati	25,607	30.56
Democratic	Ginny Chin	24,946	29.77

Arizona House of Representatives District 8 Republican Primary Election, 2004
Party	Candidate	Votes	%
Republican	Michele Reagan (inc.)	13,890	45.88
Republican	Colette Rosati (inc.)	9,199	30.38
Republican	Royce Flora	7,186	23.74

Arizona House of Representatives District 8 Election, 2004
Party	Candidate	Votes	%
Republican	Michele Reagan (inc.)	50,806	34.44
Republican	Colette Rosati (inc.)	41,496	28.13
Democratic	Nancy Stein	28,480	19.31
Democratic	Nancy Buel	26,737	18.12

Arizona House of Representatives District 8 Republican Primary Election, 2006
Party	Candidate	Votes	%
Republican	Michele Reagan (inc.)	11,302	35.81
Republican	John Kavanagh	7,979	25.28
Republican	James Burke	5,712	18.10
Republican	Carolyn Schoenrock	3,854	12.21
Republican	Travis Junion	2,717	8.61

Arizona House of Representatives District 8 Election, 2006
Party	Candidate	Votes	%
Republican	Michele Reagan (inc.)	40,118	32.89
Republican	John Kavanagh	35,260	28.90
Democratic	Stephanie Rimmer	26,684	21.87
Democratic	William Sandberg	19,931	16.34

Arizona House of Representatives District 8 Election, 2008
Party	Candidate	Votes	%
Republican	Michele Reagan (inc.)	54,780	38.29
Republican	John Kavanagh (inc.)	50,507	35.30
Democratic	Stephanie Rimmer	37,793	26.41

Arizona State Senate District 8 Election, 2010
Party	Candidate	Votes	%
Republican	Michele Reagan	52,532	69.95
Democratic	Stuart Turnansky	22,570	30.05

Arizona Secretary of State Republican Primary Election, 2014
Party	Candidate	Votes	%
Republican	Michele Reagan	217,741	43.24
Republican	Justin Pierce	174,422	34.63
Republican	Wil Cardon	111,444	22.13

Arizona Secretary of State Election, 2014
Party	Candidate	Votes	%
Republican	Michele Reagan	779,226	52.22
Democratic	Terry Goddard	712,918	47.78

Arizona Secretary of State Republican Primary Election, 2018
Party	Candidate	Votes	%
Republican	Steve Gaynor	326,279	67.30
Republican	Michele Reagan (inc.)	158,538	32.70

== See also ==
- List of female secretaries of state in the United States

Political offices
Preceded by Ken Bennett	Secretary of State of Arizona; 2015–2019	Succeeded by Katie Hobbs
