= Laurin Hendrix =

American politician

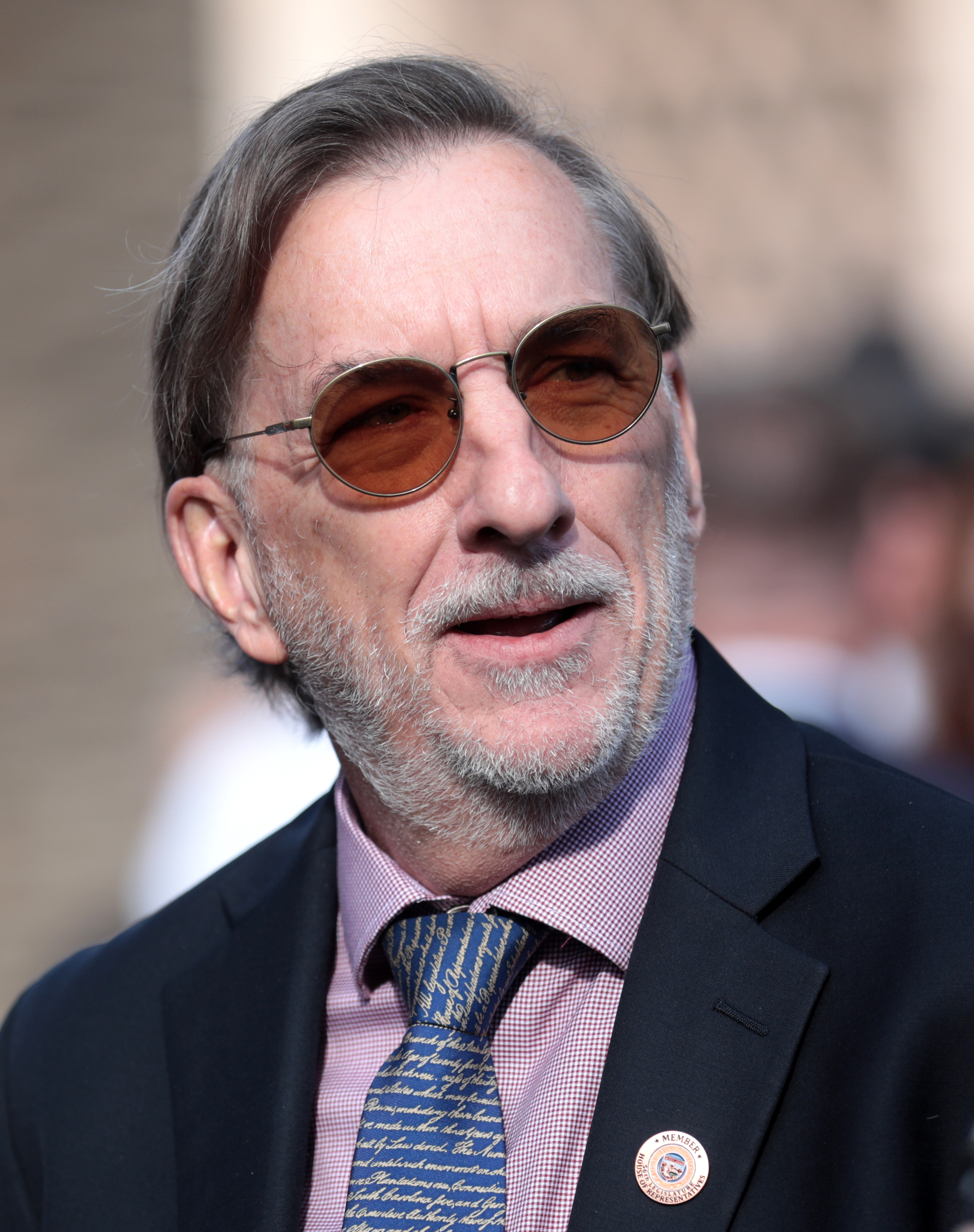
- Hendrix in 2023

Member of the Arizona House of Representatives from the 14th district
- Incumbent
- Assumed office January 9, 2023 Serving with Khyl Powell
- Preceded by: Gail Griffin
- Succeeded by: Mary Rose Wilcox (elect)

Member of the Arizona House of Representatives from the 21st district
- In office January 2009 – January 2011
- Preceded by: Eddie Farnsworth
- Succeeded by: Eddie Farnsworth; Steve R. Urie

Personal details
- Party: Republican
- Profession: Politician

Laurin Hendrix is a Republican member of the Arizona House of Representatives, representing the 14th legislative district since 2023. He previously served in the Arizona House of Representatives from 2009 through 2011. He ran for re-election in 2012, but was defeated in the Republican primary by Eddie Farnsworth and Steve R. Urie. He again ran in 2022, and was elected alongside Speaker pro tempore Travis Grantham.
