= Steve Urie =

American politician

Member of the Arizona House of Representatives from the 22nd district
- In office January 2011 – January 2013
- Preceded by: Laurin Hendrix

Personal details
- Party: Republican
- Profession: Politician

Steve Urie was a member of the Arizona House of Representatives, representing Arizona's 22nd District from January 2011 until January 2013. Prior to serving in the state legislature, Urie was a member of the Gilbert, Arizona town council from 1999 to 2007. During his tenure there he served as the vice-mayor from 2002 to 2003.
