= Arizona's 12th legislative district =

American legislative district

- Map of District 12: Approved January 21, 2022
- Senator: Mitzi Epstein (D)
- House members: Patty Contreras (D); Stacey Travers (D)
- Registration: 32.95% Democratic; 30.39% Republican; 34.88% Other
- Demographics: 59% White; 7% Black/African American; 3% Native American; 10% Asian; 20% Hispanic
- Population: 238,923
- Voting-age population: 189,809
- Registered voters: 148,788

Arizona's 12th legislative district is one of 30 in the state, consisting of a section of Maricopa County. As of 2023, there are 48 precincts in the district, all in Maricopa, with a total registered voter population of 148,788. The district has an overall population of 238,923.

Following the 2020 United States redistricting cycle, the Arizona Independent Redistricting Commission (AIRC) redrew legislative district boundaries in Arizona. According to the AIRC, the district is outside of competitive range and considered leaning Democratic.

== Political representation ==
The district is represented in the 56th Arizona State Legislature, which convenes from January 1, 2023, to December 31, 2024, by Mitzi Epstein (D-Chandler) in the Arizona Senate and by Patty Contreras (D-Ahwatukee) and Stacey Travers (D-Phoenix) in the Arizona House of Representatives.

Name	Image	Residence	Office	Party
Mitzi Epstein		Chandler	State senator	Democrat
Patty Contreras		Ahwatukee	State representative	Democrat
Stacey Travers		Phoenix	State representative	Democrat

== Election results ==
The 2022 elections were the first in the newly drawn district.

=== Arizona Senate ===
2022 Arizona's 12th Senate district election
Party	Candidate	Votes	%
Democratic	Mitzi Epstein	58,349	58.14
Republican	David Richardson	42,008	41.86
Total votes		100,357	100
Democratic hold			

=== Arizona House of Representatives ===
2022 Arizona House of Representatives election, 12th district
Party	Candidate	Votes	%
Democratic	Patty Contreras	55,454	29.30
Democratic	Stacey Travers	54,484	28.79
Republican	James Chaston	39,298	20.76
Republican	Terry Roe	40,024	21.15
Total votes		189,260	100.00
Democratic hold			
Democratic hold			

== See also ==
- List of Arizona legislative districts
- Arizona State Legislature
