= 2020 Arizona elections =

- November 3, 2020

Elections were held in the U.S. state of Arizona on November 3, 2020, as part of the 2020 General Election. Arizona voters chose 11 electors to represent them in the Electoral College via a popular vote. Three seats on the Arizona Corporation Commission were up for election, as were all nine of Arizona seats in the United States House of Representatives, and one of its seats in the United States Senate. Primary elections were held in August 2020. Paper ballots for voting by mail were sent to all registered voters in the state.

== Federal offices ==
=== U.S. President ===
Arizona was represented by 11 electors in the electoral college. Joe Biden won the state with 49.36% of the popular vote, defeating incumbent President Donald Trump by less than 11,000 votes. This was the first time a Democratic presidential candidate won Arizona since Bill Clinton in 1996 and only the second time since Harry Truman in 1948.

=== U.S. Senate ===
A special election was held due to the death of Republican senator and presidential candidate John McCain.

Former U.S. senator Jon Kyl was originally appointed to the seat, but resigned on December 31, 2018. Outgoing U.S. Representative Martha McSally was appointed to fill the seat following Kyl's resignation.

Democrat Mark Kelly defeated McSally, winning 51% of the vote.

=== U.S. House of Representatives ===
All nine of Arizona's seats in the United States House of Representatives were up for election in 2020. Before the election, Republicans held four seats and Democrats five. No districts changed hands, and thus Democrats maintained control.

== State offices ==
=== Corporation Commission ===
2020 Arizona Corporation Commission election
- November 3, 2020

3 seats on the Arizona Corporation Commission
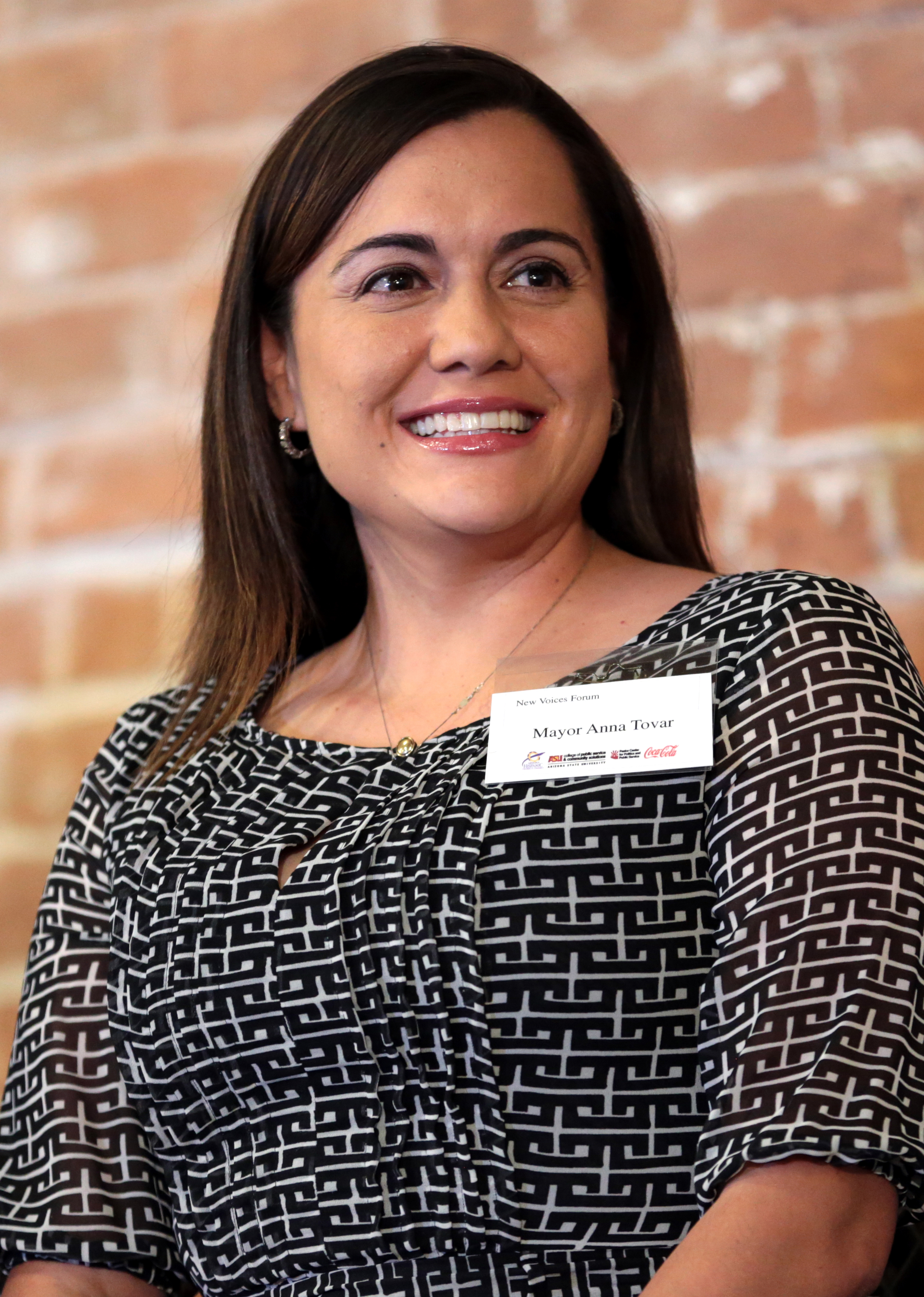

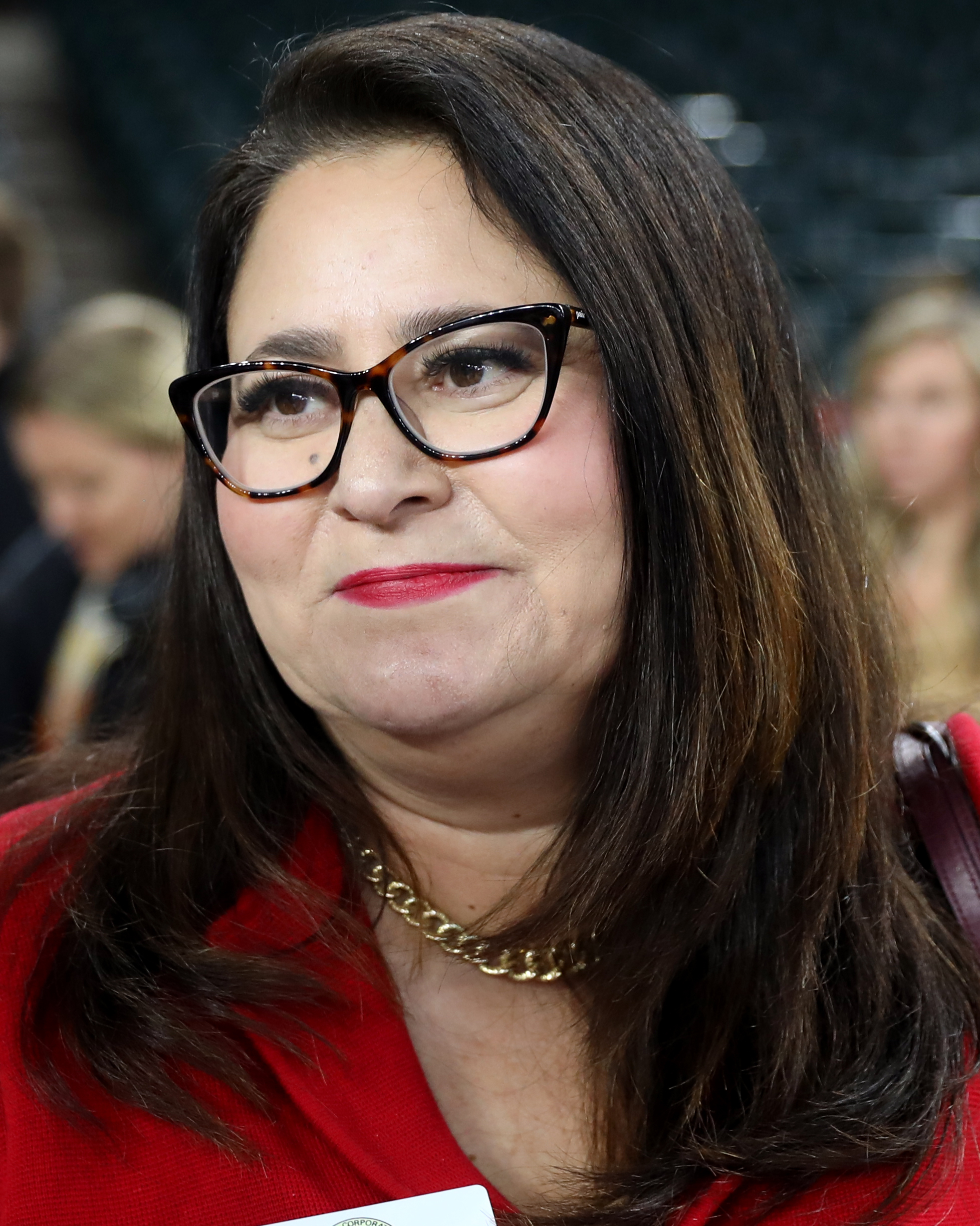

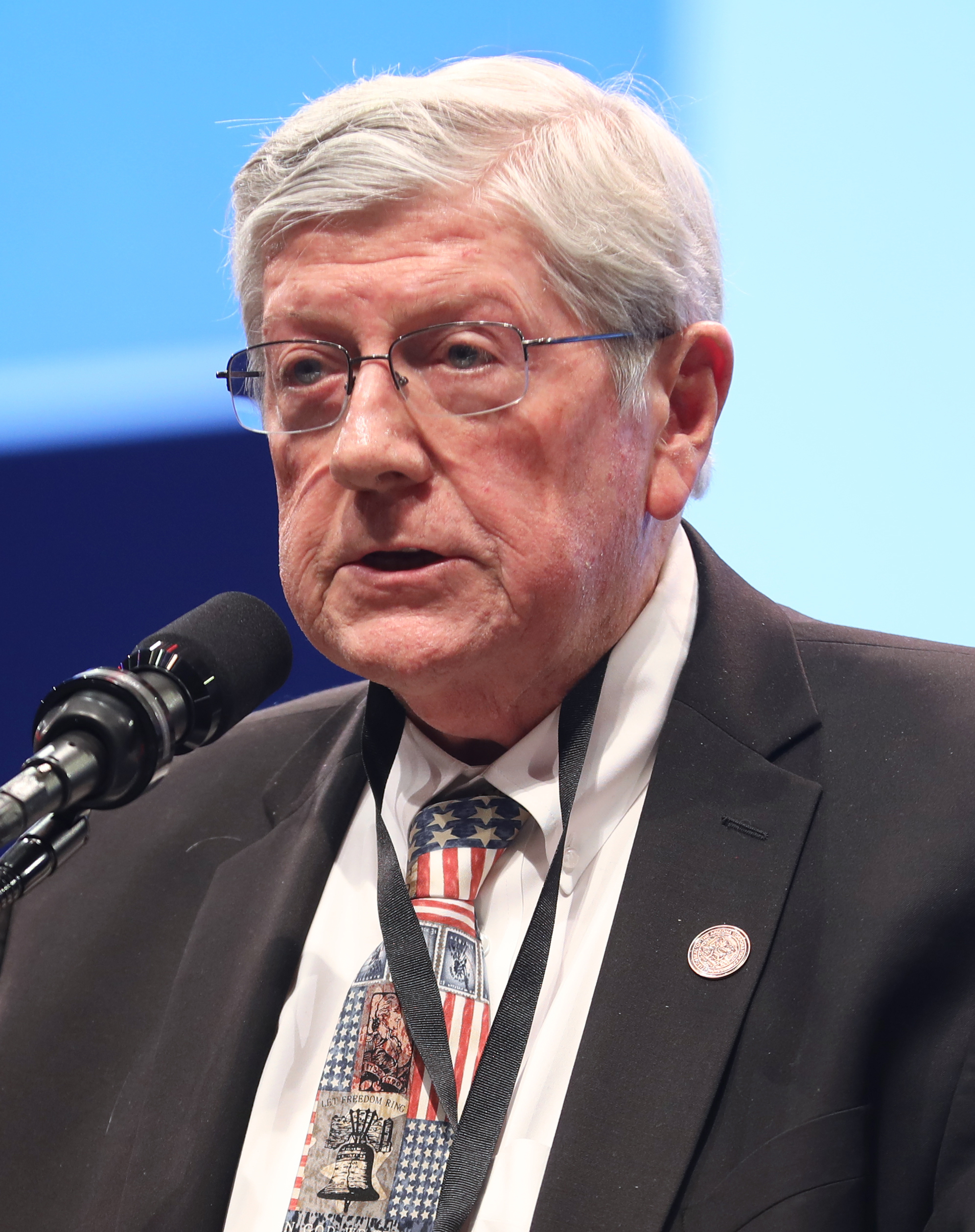

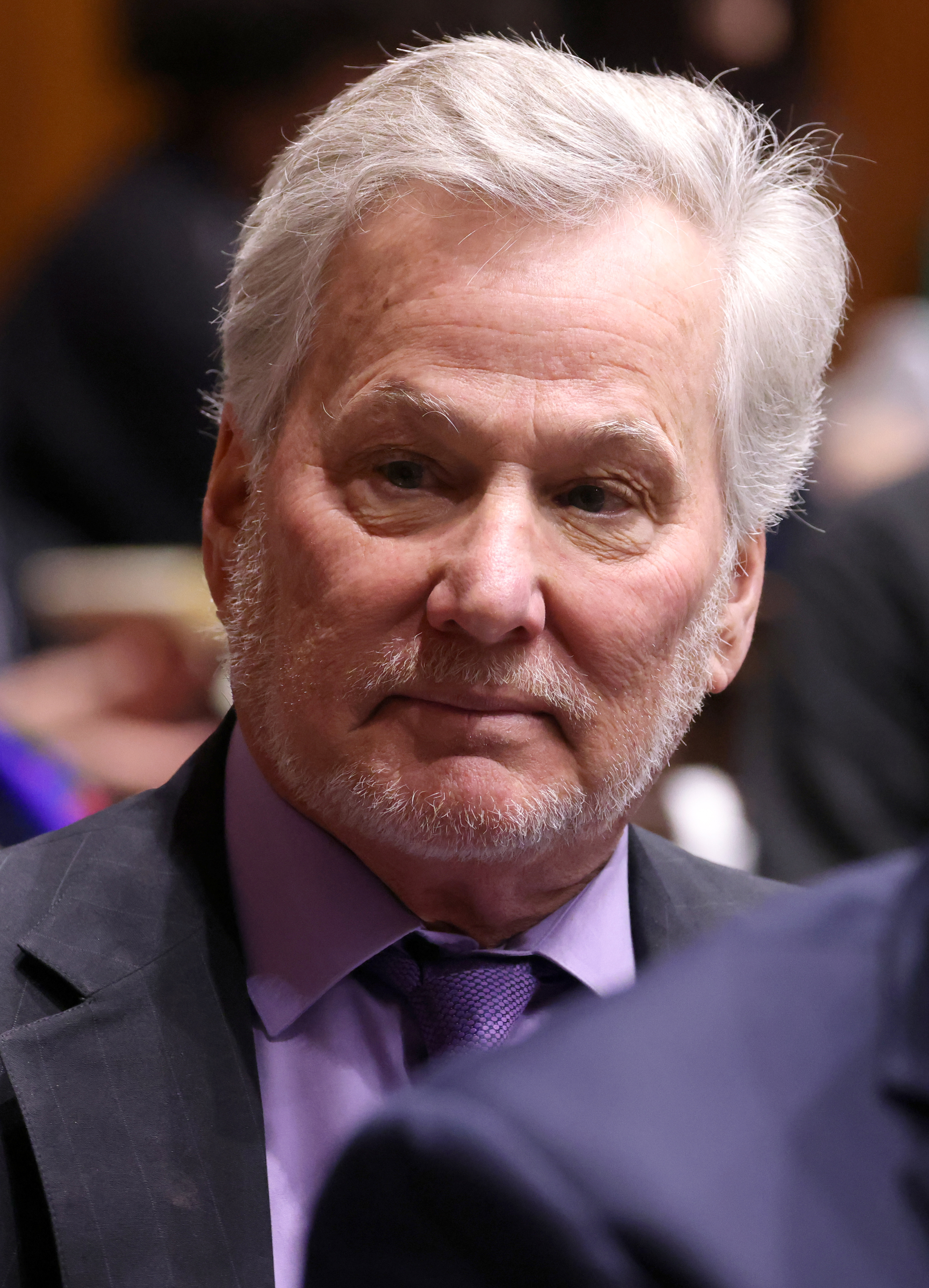

	Majority party	Minority party	Third party
Candidate	Anna Tovar	Lea Márquez Peterson	James O'Connor
Party	Democratic	Republican	Republican
Popular vote	1,450,194	1,449,963	1,434,236
Percentage	17.524%	17.521%	17.33%
	Fourth party	Fifth party	Sixth party
Candidate	Eric Sloan	Bill Mundell	Shea Stanfield
Party	Republican	Democratic	Democratic
Popular vote	1,379,804	1,295,836	1,264,909
Percentage	16.67%	15.66%	15.28%
Commissioners before election
Bob Burns (R)
Andy Tobin (R)
Boyd Dunn (R)
Elected Commissioners
Anna Tovar (D)
Lea Márquez
Peterson (R)
James O'Connor (R)

Three seats on the Arizona Corporation Commission were up for election. Republican Bob Burns was term-limited and therefore ineligible to run for re-election to a third term in office.

==== Republican primary ====
===== Candidates =====
- James O'Connor, candidate for the commission in 2018 (nominated via write-in)
- Lea Márquez Peterson, incumbent, appointed to replace Andy Tobin
- Eric Sloan, candidate for the commission in 2018

Not on the ballot

- Avery Block
- Neil DeSanti
- Boyd Dunn, incumbent, removed for insufficient signatures
- Dave Farnsworth, state senator, dropped out
- Nick Myers, legislative candidate in 2018
- Kim Owens, public relations executive, removed for insufficient signatures
- Patrick Tucker

==== Democratic primary ====
===== Candidates =====
- Bill Mundell, former Republican state representative and commissioner
- Shea Stanfield
- Anna Tovar, mayor of Tolleson, Arizona, former state senator

Not on the ballot

- John Dougherty III
- Paul Newman, former commissioner

==== General election ====
===== Polling =====
Each voter selected up to three candidates in the state Corporation Commission general election, with the top three vote-getters winning the seats. Consequently, poll results in the table immediately below are displayed as the accumulation of a candidate's first, second and third preferences, and therefore total 300%, instead of 100%. Where a given percentage of voters are not decided with respect to multiple choices, that percentage is multiplied by the number of choices for which they are undecided (so, for instance, if 1% of voters had not picked any candidate, they would be listed in the table below as 3% of the total vote).

Poll source	Date(s) administered	Sample size (Note: Key: A – all adults RV – registered voters LV – likely voters V – unclear)	Margin of error	Anna Tovar (D)	Lea Márquez Peterson (R)	Bill Mundell (D)	Shea Stanfield (D)	James O'Connor (R)	Eric Sloan (R)	Undecided
Patinkin Research Strategies/Arizona Research Consortium (D)	October 21–24, 2020	729 (LV)	± 3.6%	37%	31%	25%	24%	21%	20%	69%
Patinkin Research Strategies/Arizona Research Consortium (D)	October 1–3, 2020	604 (LV)	± 3.8%	32%	30%	29%	28%	31%	31%	96%
Patinkin Research Strategies/Arizona Research Consortium (D)	September 10–13, 2020	679 (LV)	± 3.8%	28%	26%	27%	26%	29%	27%	120%

===== Results =====
Arizona Corporation Commission election, 2020
Party	Candidate	Votes	%
Democratic	Anna Tovar	1,450,194	17.52%
Republican	Lea Márquez Peterson (incumbent)	1,449,963	17.52%
Republican	James O'Connor	1,434,236	17.33%
Republican	Eric Sloan	1,379,804	16.67%
Democratic	Bill Mundell	1,295,836	15.66%
Democratic	Shea Stanfield	1,264,909	15.29%
Independent	Christina Gibson (write-in)	411	0.01%
Republican	Patrick Finerd (write-in)	232	0.00%
Total votes		8,275,585	100%
Democratic gain from Republican			
Republican hold			
Republican hold			

== State legislature ==
All 90 seats in both chambers of the Arizona State Legislature were up for election in 2020. Democrats gained a seat in the state senate.

=== State Senate ===
Party	Before	After	Change
Republican	17	16	▼1
Democratic	13	14	▲1
Total	30	30	Steady

=== House of Representatives ===
Party	Before	After	Change
Republican	31	31	Steady
Democratic	29	29	Steady
Total	60	60	Steady

== Supreme Court ==
Three justices on the Arizona Supreme Court were up for retention in 2020.

=== Justice Brutinel retention ===
Results by county Yes: 80–90%; 70–80%

Robert M. Brutinel was appointed by Governor Jan Brewer in 2010 to succeed retiring justice Michael D. Ryan. He was retained by the voters in 2014.

Justice Brutinel retention, 2020
Choice	Votes	%
For	1,865,552	75.13
Against	617,429	24.87
Total	2,482,981	100.00
Source: Arizona Secretary of State

=== Justice Gould retention ===
Results by county Yes: 80–90%; 70–80%; 60–70%

Andrew Gould was appointed by Governor Doug Ducey in 2016 to a newly established seat on the Arizona Supreme Court after it was expanded to seven justices.

Justice Gould retention, 2020
Choice	Votes	%
For	1,683,460	68.06
Against	790,095	31.94
Total	2,473,555	100.00
Source: Arizona Secretary of State

=== Justice Lopez retention ===
Results by county Yes: 80–90%; 70–80%; 60–70%

John Lopez IV was appointed by Governor Doug Ducey in 2016 to a newly established seat on the Arizona Supreme Court after it was expanded to seven justices.

Justice Lopez retention, 2020
Choice	Votes	%
For	1,806,530	72.65
Against	679,989	27.35
Total	2,486,519	100.00
Source: Arizona Secretary of State

== Ballot initiatives ==
Two initiatives were approved for the general election ballot.

=== Proposition 207 ===
Proposition 207, the Smart and Safe Arizona Act, is to legalize and tax cannabis for adult use.

==== Polling ====
Likely voters polled in July 2020 indicated 62% support for cannabis legalization.

On Proposition 207

Poll source	Date(s) administered	Sample size	Margin of error	For Proposition 207	Against Proposition 207	Other	Undecided
OH Predictive Insights	October 22–25, 2020	716 (LV)	± 3.7%	60%	36%	0% (Note: "Refused" with 0%)	4%
Monmouth University	October 11–13, 2020	502 (RV)	± 4.4%	56%	36%	0% (Note: Would not vote with 0%)	7%
OH Predictive Insights	October 4–8, 2020	608 (LV)	± 4.0%	55%	37%	1% (Note: "Refused" with 1%)	7%
Suffolk University	September 26–30, 2020	500 (LV)	± 4.4%	46%	34%	1% (Note: "Refused" with 1%)	19%
Strategies 360/Smart and Safe Arizona (Note: Smart and Safe Arizona endorsed Proposition 207 prior to this poll's sampling period)	September 24–29, 2020	800 (LV)	± 3.5%	57%	38%	–	5%
Monmouth University	September 11–15, 2020	420 (RV)	± 4.8%	51%	41%	3% (Note: Would not vote with 3%)	6%
Strategies 360/Smart and Safe Arizona (Note: Smart and Safe Arizona endorsed Proposition 207 prior to this poll's sampling period)	Early August, 2020	– (V) (Note: Not yet released)	–	57%	37%	–	6%
HighGround Inc.	May 18–22, 2020	400 (LV)	± 4.9%	66%	25%	–	9% (Note: Includes "Refused")

On whether recreational marijuana should be legal

Poll source	Date(s) administered	Sample size	Margin of error	Yes	No	Other	Undecided
OH Predictive Insights	September 8–10, 2020	600 (LV)	± 4%	45%	44%	0% (Note: "Refused" with 0%)	9%
OH Predictive Insights	July 6–7, 2020	600 (LV)	± 4%	62%	32%	No voters (Note: "Refused" with no voters)	6%
OH Predictive Insights	December 3–4, 2019	628 (LV)	± 3.9%	51%	42%	–	7%
OH Predictive Insights	October 31 – November 8, 2019	900 (RV)	± 3.3%	54%	33%	–	13%
OH Predictive Insights	August 13–14, 2019	600 (LV)	± 4%	50%	40%	–	10%
OH Predictive Insights	February 12–13, 2019	600 (LV)	± 4%	52%	41%	–	7%

=== Proposition 208 ===
Proposition 208, the Invest in Education Act, is to impose a 3.5% income tax surcharge on high earners and invest the revenue generated in education.

==== Polling ====
Poll source	Date(s) administered	Sample size	Margin of error	For Proposition 208	Against Proposition 208	Other	Undecided
Patinkin Research Strategies	October 21–24, 2020	729 (LV)	± 3.6%	55%	40%	–	5%
Monmouth University	October 11–13, 2020	502 (RV)	± 4.4%	60%	34%	1% (Note: Would not vote with 1%)	5%
OH Predictive Insights	October 4–8, 2020	608 (LV)	± 4.0%	55%	39%	0% (Note: "Refused" with 0%)	6%
Data Orbital	October 3–5, 2020	550 (LV)	± 4.2%	51%	37%	–	12%
HighGround Inc.	September 28 – October 5, 2020	400 (LV)	± 4.9%	56%	38%	–	6% (Note: Includes "Refused")
Patinkin Research Strategies	October 1–3, 2020	604 (LV)	± 3.8%	55%	37%	–	9%
Suffolk University/USA Today	September 26–30, 2020	500 (LV)	± 4.4%	47%	37%	1% (Note: "Refused" with 1%)	15%
Monmouth University	September 11–15, 2020	420 (RV)	± 4.8%	66%	21%	1% (Note: Would not vote with 1%)	7%

==== Results ====
Results by county Yes: 60–70%; 50–60%; No: 60–70%; 50–60%

Proposition 208
Choice	Votes	%
For	1,675,810	51.75
Against	1,562,639	48.25
Total	3,238,449	100.00
Source: Arizona Secretary of State

== See also ==
- Elections in Arizona
- Bilingual elections requirement for Arizona (per Voting Rights Act Amendments of 2006)

== Notes ==
Partisan clients
