= 2024 Arizona Corporation Commission election =

- November 5, 2024

3 seats on the Arizona Corporation Commission
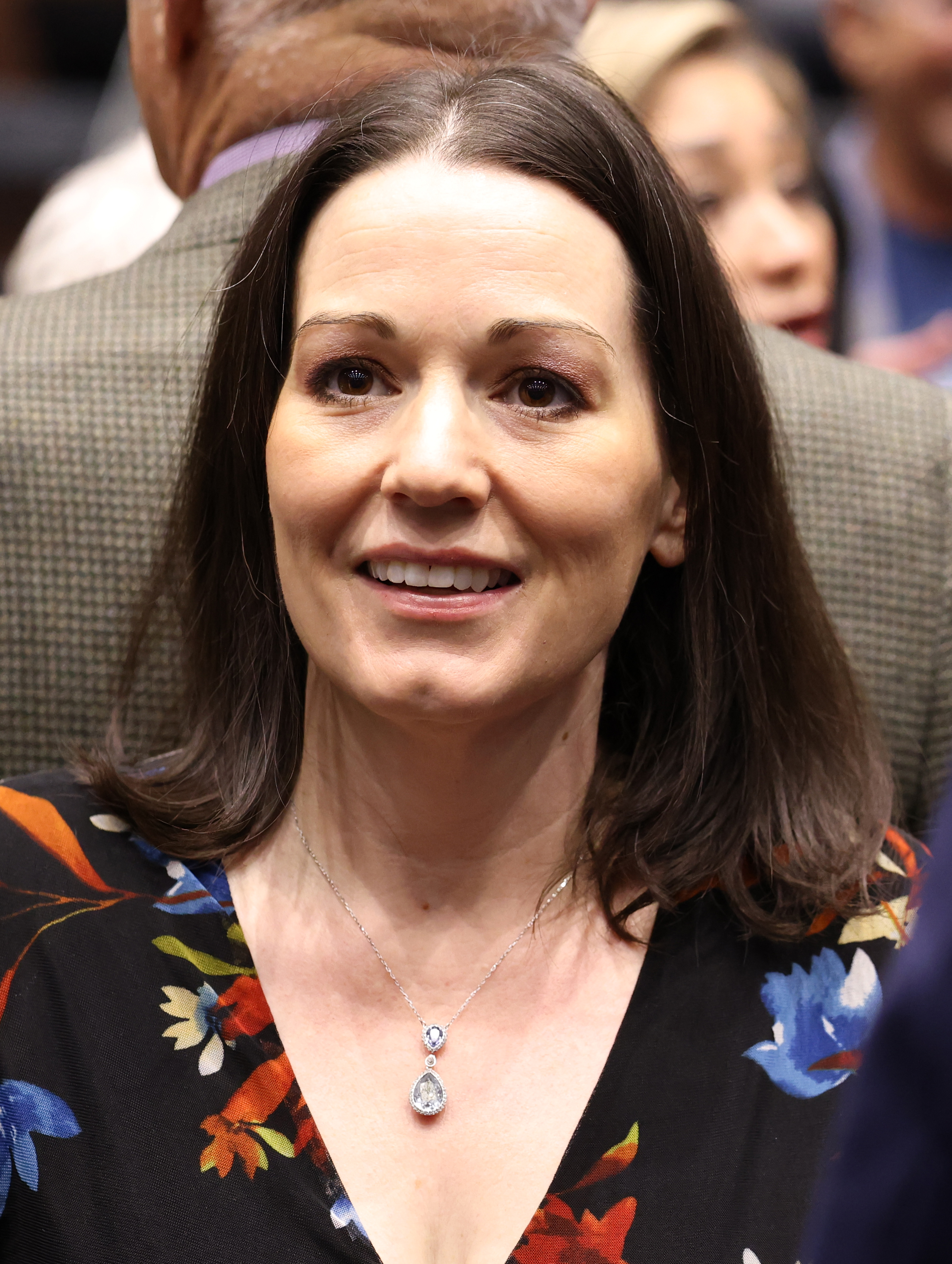

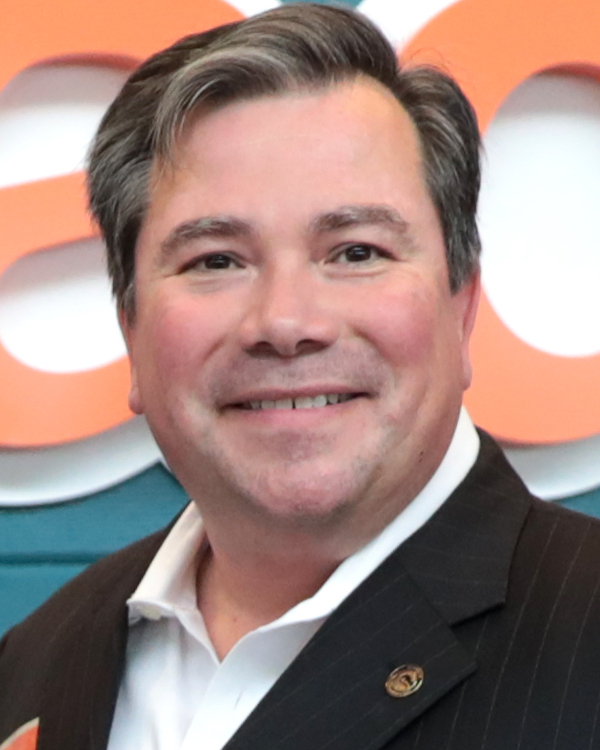

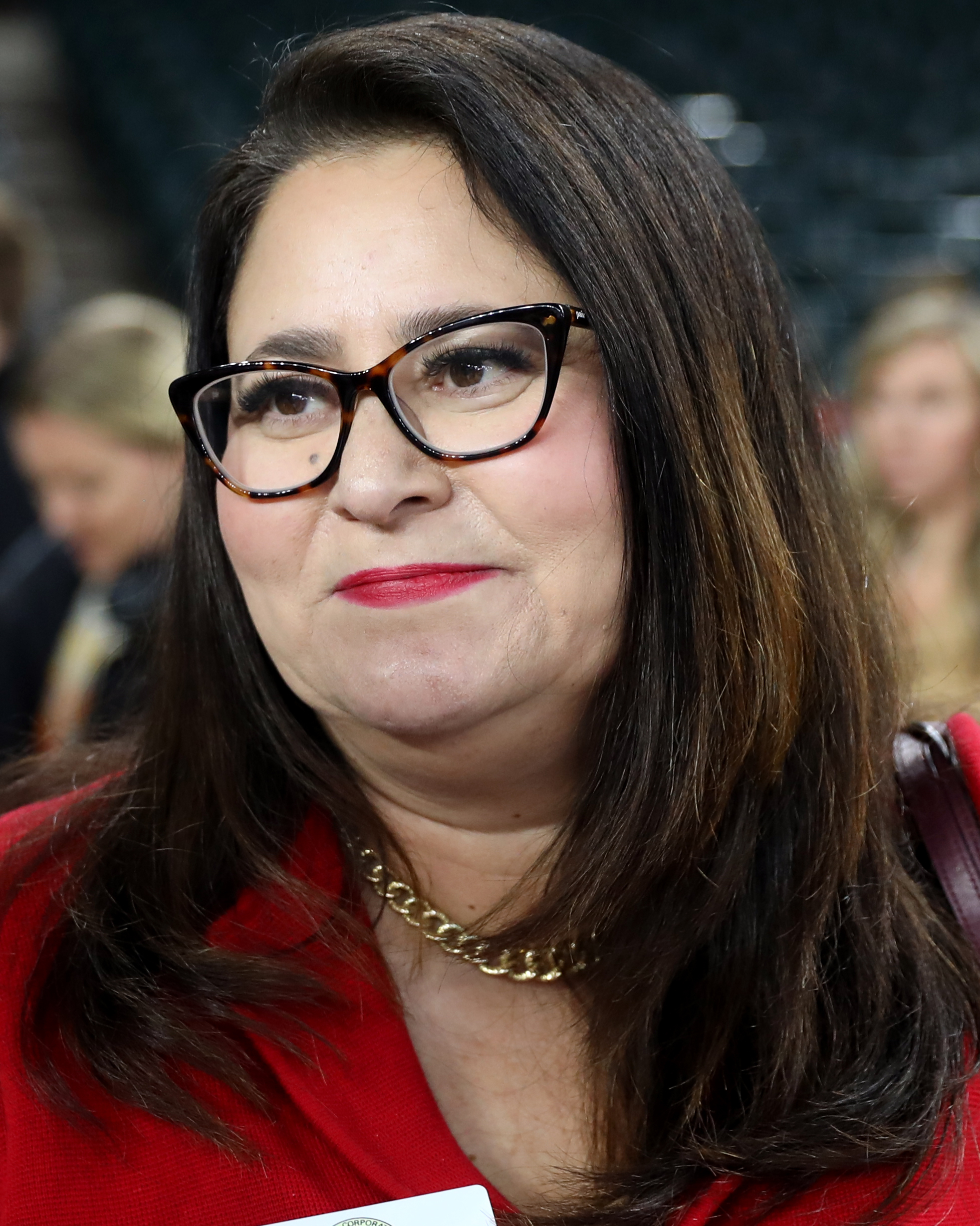

	Majority party	Minority party	Third party
Candidate	Rachel Walden	Rene Lopez	Lea Márquez Peterson
Party	Republican	Republican	Republican
Popular vote	1,525,622	1,481,922	1,440,681
Percentage	17.89%	17.37%	16.89%
	Fourth party	Fifth party	Sixth party
Candidate	Ylenia Aguilar	Jonathon Hill	Joshua Polacheck
Party	Democratic	Democratic	Democratic
Popular vote	1,336,868	1,301,904	1,230,440
Percentage	15.67%	15.26%	14.43%
commissioners before election
Lea Márquez
Peterson (R)
James O'Connor (R)
Anna Tovar (D)
Elected commissioners
Rachel Walden (R)
Rene Lopez (R)
Lea Márquez
Peterson (R)

The 2024 Arizona Corporation Commission election was held on November 5, 2024. It elected three members of the Arizona Corporation Commission, a five-member body tasked with regulating public utilities in the state.

Members are elected to four-year terms, with three seats up for election in presidential years and the other two up for election in midterm years. The elections use plurality block voting, and each party will nominate 3 candidates. Republicans currently hold 4 seats on the board, while Democrats hold 1.

Two Republicans, Lea Márquez Peterson and James O'Connor, were up for re-election in 2024, as is the lone Democrat, Anna Tovar. Peterson ran for re-election, while Tovar and O'Connor did not.

The election focused on Arizona's energy mix with the Republican candidates calling for the continued use of coal and gas-fired power plants and the Democratic candidates calling for a market-based approach that included solar, wind, and battery.

== Republican primary ==
=== Declared ===
- Rene Lopez, former at-large Chandler city councilor and candidate for Arizona's 4th congressional district in 2022
- Lea Márquez Peterson, incumbent commissioner
- Rachel Walden, member of the Mesa Public Schools Governing Board

=== Withdrawn ===
- Christy Kelly, mediation business owner

=== Declined ===
- James O'Connor, incumbent commissioner

=== Endorsements ===
Rene Lopez

Organizations

- Arizona Chamber of Commerce and Industry
Lea Márquez Peterson

Organizations

- Arizona Chamber of Commerce and Industry
Rachel Walden

Statewide officials

- Nick Myers, corporation commissioner
- Justin Olson, former corporation commissioner
- Kevin Thompson, corporation commissioner

State legislators

- Dave Farnsworth, state senator
- Justin Heap, state representative
- Barbara Parker, state representative
- Jacqueline Parker, state representative

Organizations

- Arizona Chamber of Commerce and Industry

=== Results ===
Republican primary results
Party	Candidate	Votes	%
Republican	Rachel Walden	300,654	36.59
Republican	Rene Lopez	264,442	32.18
Republican	Lea Márquez Peterson (incumbent)	251,348	30.59
Write-in		5,273	0.64
Total votes		821,717	100.00

== Democratic primary ==
=== Declared ===
- Ylenia Aguilar, member of the Central Arizona Water Conservation District Board
- Jonathon Hill, engineer at the Mars Space Flight Facility
- Joshua Polacheck, former executive director of the Pima County Democratic Party and former public diplomacy officer at the U.S. Department of State

=== Declined ===
- Anna Tovar, incumbent commissioner

=== Results ===
Democratic primary results
Party	Candidate	Votes	%
Democratic	Ylenia Aguilar	239,841	35.98
Democratic	Jonathon Hill	215,923	32.39
Democratic	Joshua Polacheck	208,241	31.24
Write-in		2,579	0.39
Total votes		666,584	100.00

== Green primary ==
=== Write-in candidates ===
- Mike Cease, secretary of the Arizona Green Party
- Nina Luxenberg, physician

=== Results ===
Green primary results
Party	Candidate	Votes	%
Green	Mike Cease (write-in)	73	29.20
Green	Nina Luxenberg (write-in)	72	28.80
Write-in		105	42.00
Total votes		250	100.00

== General election ==
=== Results ===
General election results
Party	Candidate	Votes	%
Republican	Rachel Walden	1,525,622	17.89%
Republican	Rene Lopez	1,481,992	17.37%
Republican	Lea Márquez Peterson (incumbent)	1,440,681	16.89%
Democratic	Ylenia Aguilar	1,336,868	15.67%
Democratic	Jonathon Hill	1,301,904	15.26%
Democratic	Joshua Polacheck	1,230,440	14.43%
Green	Nina Luxenberg	110,486	1.30%
Green	Mike Cease	101,473	1.19%
Democratic	Frank Bertone (Write-in)	144	0.00
Total votes		8,529,610	100.00%
Republican gain from Democratic			

== See also ==
- 2024 Arizona elections
