= 2012 Arizona elections =

- November 6, 2012

A general election was held in the U.S. state of Arizona on November 6, 2012. Along with the presidential election, a Class I U.S. Senate seat, nine seats in the United States House of Representatives and several statewide and local offices were up for election. Primary elections were held on August 28, 2012.

== President of the United States ==
Republican nominee Mitt Romney won Arizona by defeating Democratic incumbent Barack Obama and gained eleven electoral votes.

== United States Senate ==
Incumbent Republican senator and Senate minority whip Jon Kyl decided not to seek a fourth term, thus creating an open seat. Republican U.S. representative Jeff Flake won the election by narrowly defeating Democratic nominee and former surgeon general of the United States Richard Carmona.

== United States House of Representatives ==
=== June special election ===
A special election was held in the 8th congressional district to replace Gabby Giffords. Democrat Ron Barber won the election by defeating Republican Jesse Kelly.

=== November general election ===
Following the 2010 United States census, Arizona gained one electoral vote, thus bringing the total number of congressional districts in the state to nine.

Party	Candidates	Votes		Seats		
Party	Candidates	No.	%	No.	+/–	%
Republican	8	1,131,663	52.07	4	▼1	44.44
Democratic	9	946,994	43.57	5	▲2	55.56
Libertarian	7	82,282	3.79	0	Steady	0.0
Americans Elect	2	6,740	0.31	0	Steady	0.0
Green	1	5,637	0.26	0	Steady	0.0
Write-in	1	1	0.00	0	Steady	0.0
Total	28	2,173,317	100.0	9	▲1	100.0

Popular vote
Republican	52.07%
Democratic	43.57%
Libertarian	3.79%
Americans Elect	0.31%
Green	0.26%
Other	0.00%

House seats
Democratic	55.56%
Republican	44.44%

== Corporation Commission ==
2012 Arizona Corporation Commission election
- November 6, 2012
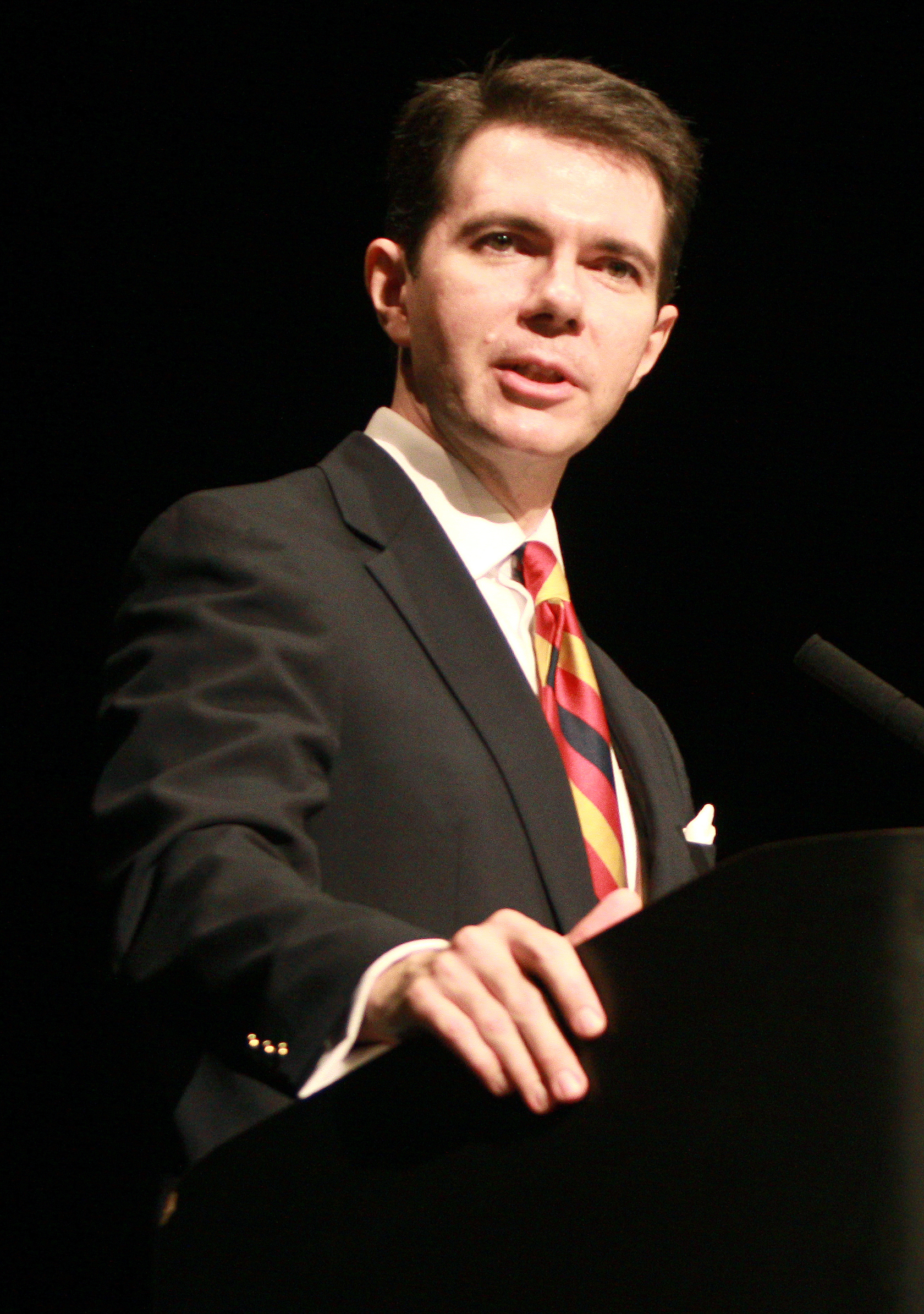

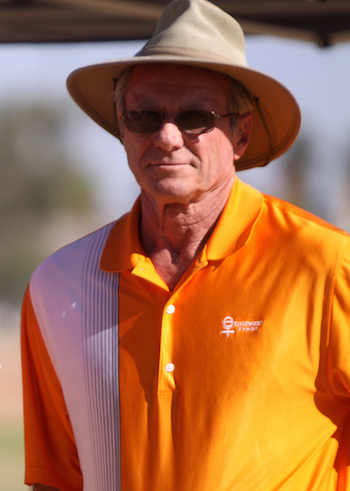

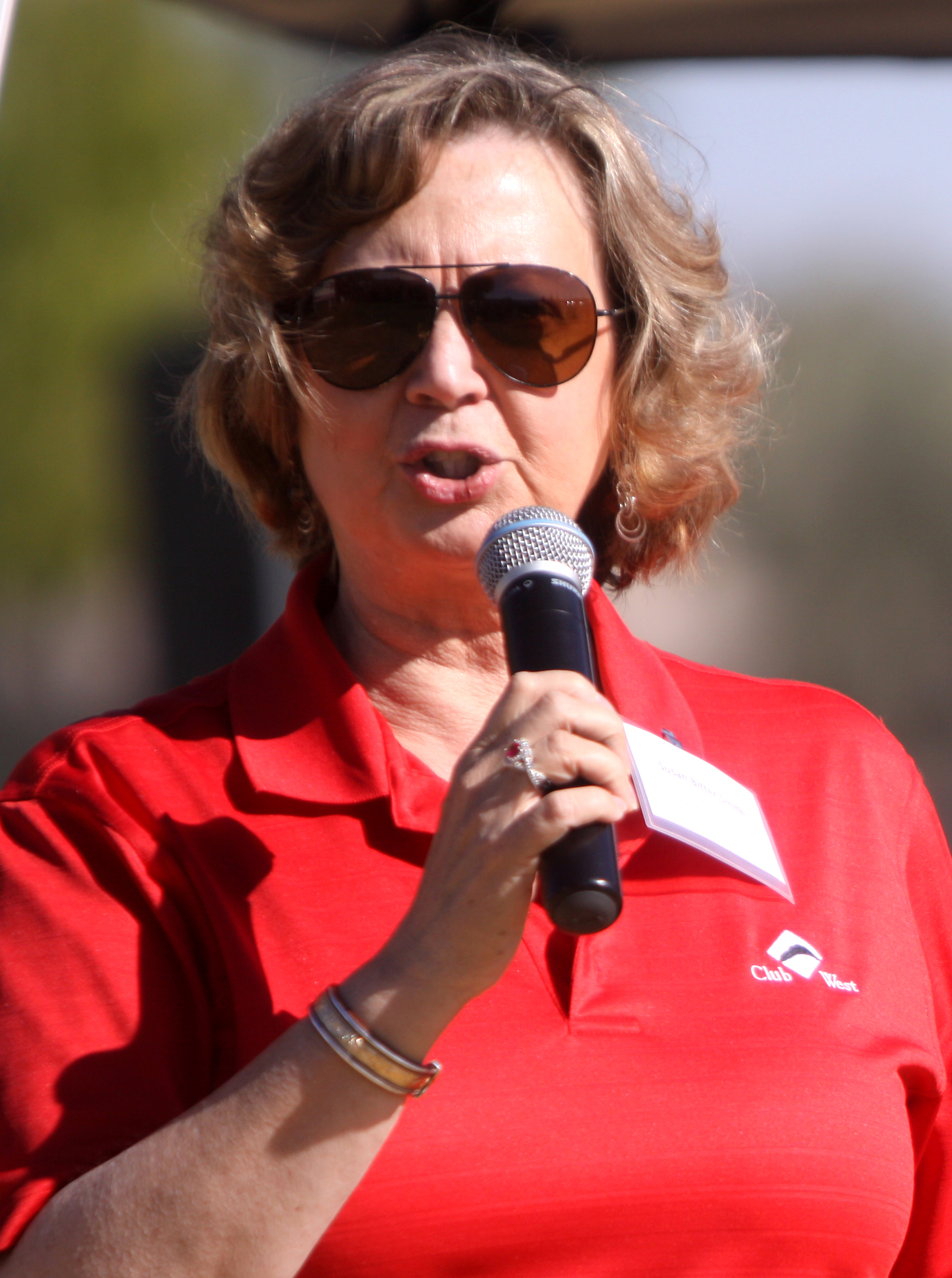

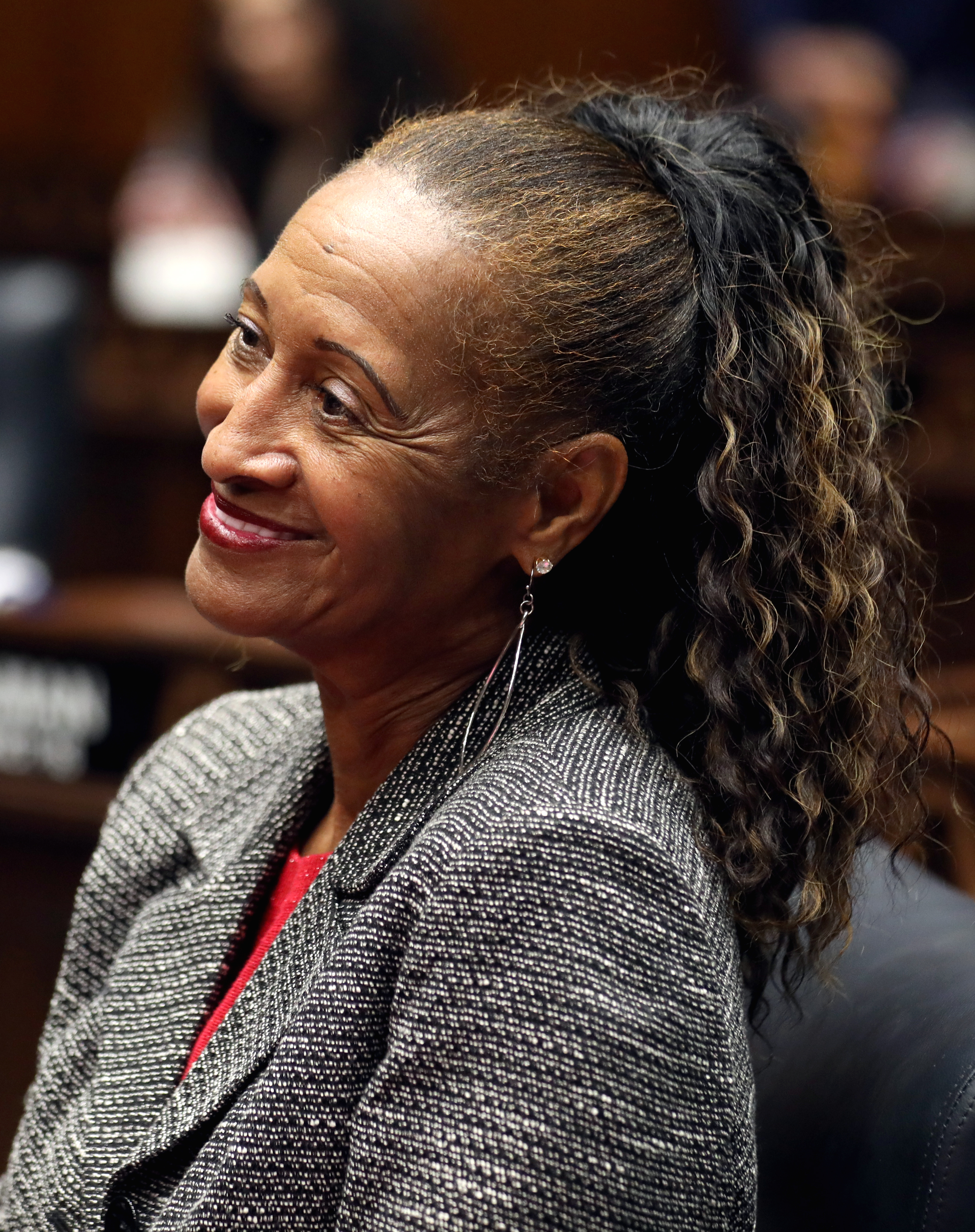

Nominee	Bob Stump	Bob Burns	Susan Bitter Smith
Party	Republican	Republican	Republican
Popular vote	979,034	943,157	935,573
Percentage	17.47%	16.83%	16.69%
Nominee	Paul Newman	Sandra Kennedy	Marcia Busching
Party	Democratic	Democratic	Democratic
Popular vote	868,726	862,876	776,472
Percentage	15.50%	15.39%	13.85%
Commissioners before election
Paul Newman (D)
Sandra Kennedy (D)
Bob Stump (R)
Elected Commissioners
Bob Stump (R)
Bob Burns (R)
Susan Bitter Smith (R)

Three of the five seats on the Arizona Corporation Commission were up for election. Democratic incumbents Paul Newman and Sandra Kennedy and Republican incumbent Bob Stump all ran for re-election. Both Newman and Kennedy were ousted as Republicans swept all three seats.

=== Republican primary ===
==== Candidates ====
- Bob Stump, incumbent commissioner.
- Bob Burns, former Arizona Senate president.
- Susan Bitter Smith, telecommunications executive and former Scottsdale councilwoman.

==== Results ====
Republican primary results
Party	Candidate	Votes	%
Republican	Bob Stump (incumbent)	349,966	35.02%
Republican	Susan Bitter Smith	330,147	33.04%
Republican	Bob Burns	319,151	31.94%
Total votes		999,264	100%

=== Democratic primary ===
==== Candidates ====
- Sandra Kennedy, incumbent commissioner.
- Paul Newman, incumbent commissioner.
- Marcia Busching, attorney.

==== Results ====
Democratic primary results
Party	Candidate	Votes	%
Democratic	Sandra Kennedy (incumbent)	232,403	36.57%
Democratic	Paul Newman (incumbent)	209,094	32.91%
Democratic	Marcia Busching	193,947	30.52%
Total votes		635,444	100%

=== Third party candidates ===
- Christopher Gohl (Libertarian Party)
- Thomas Meadows (Green Party)
- Daniel Pout (Green Party)

=== General election ===
==== Debate ====
2012 Arizona Corporation Commission election debate
Date			Host			Moderator		
October 2, 2012			Arizona PBS			Ted Simons		
Key: P Participant A Absent N Not invited I Invited W Withdrawn
Republican			Democratic			Green		Libertarian
Bob Stump	Bob Burns	Susan Bitter Smith	Paul Newman	Sandra Kennedy	Marcia Busching	Thomas Meadows	Daniel Pout	Christopher Gohl
P	P	P	P	P	P	P	P	P
Link: YouTube

==== Results ====
Arizona Corporation Commission election, 2012
Party	Candidate	Votes	%
Republican	Bob Stump (incumbent)	979,034	17.47%
Republican	Bob Burns	943,157	16.83%
Republican	Susan Bitter Smith	935,573	16.69%
Democratic	Paul Newman (incumbent)	868,726	15.50%
Democratic	Sandra Kennedy (incumbent)	862,876	15.39%
Democratic	Marcia Busching	776,472	13.85%
Libertarian	Christopher Gohl	112,490	2.01%
Green	Thomas Meadows	67,950	1.21%
Green	Daniel Pout	58,607	1.05%
Total votes		5,604,885	100%
Republican hold			
Republican gain from Democratic			
Republican gain from Democratic			

== State Legislature ==
All 30 members of the Arizona Senate and all 60 members of the Arizona House of Representatives were up for election. Democrats flipped multiple seats in both chambers.

=== State Senate ===
Party	Before	After	Change
Republican	21	17	▼4
Democratic	9	13	▲4
Total	30	30	

=== House of Representatives ===
Party	Before	After	Change
Republican	40	36	▼4
Democratic	19	24	▲5
Independent	1	0	▼1
Total	60	60	

== Supreme Court ==
Results by county Yes: 60–70%; 70–80%; 80–90%

One seat on the Arizona Supreme Court was up for retention. Justice John Pelander was appointed by Governor Jan Brewer in 2009 to succeed retiring justice Ruth McGregor.

Justice Pelander retention, 2012
Choice	Votes	%
For	1,070,838	73.95
Against	377,259	26.05
Total	1,448,097	100.00
Source: Arizona Secretary of State

== Ballot propositions ==
Arizona had nine statewide propositions on the ballot in 2012.

2012 Arizona ballot propositions
No.	Description	Votes				Type
No.	Description	Yes	%	No	%	Type
114	Prohibits felony crime victims from having to pay damages.	1,664,473	79.95	417,431	20.05	Legislatively referred constitutional amendment
115	Increases term lengths and retirement age for the judiciary and requires superior courts to publish decisions online.	553,132	27.66	1,446,970	72.34	Legislatively referred constitutional amendment
116	Establishes the tax exemption amount for business equipment to be equal to the combined earnings of 50 workers.	852,981	43.92	1,089,294	56.08	Legislatively referred constitutional amendment
117	Sets a 5% annual cap on increases in property values used to determine property taxes and establish a single limited property value as the basis for calculating all property taxes on real property.	1,132,766	56.67	866,249	43.33	Legislatively referred constitutional amendment
118	Adjusts the distribution formula for the State Land Trust Permanent Endowment Fund.	950,938	50.52	931,238	49.48	Legislatively referred constitutional amendment
119	Authorizes the exchange of state trust lands for protecting military facilities or improving land management.	1,194,594	61.94	733,907	38.06	Legislatively referred constitutional amendment
120	Declares Arizona's sovereignty over public lands and all natural resources within its boundaries, excluding Indian reservations, federal property, or land ceded by the state.	623,461	32.27	1,308,299	67.73	Legislatively referred constitutional amendment
121	Establishes a top-two system for primary elections.	662,366	33.07	1,340,286	66.93	Citizen-initiated constitutional amendment
204	Permanently increases the state sales tax by one cent per dollar.	768,422	36.22	1,353,212	63.78	Citizen-initiated state statute
Source: Arizona Secretary of State

Results by county

Proposition 114 results by county
Yes:
- 60–70%
- 70–80%
- 80–90%

Proposition 115 results by county
No:
- 60–70%
- 70–80%

Proposition 116 results by county
No:
- 50–60%
- 60–70%

Proposition 117 results by county
Yes:
- 50–60%
- 60–70%
No:
- 50–60%

Proposition 118 results by county
Yes:
- 50–60%
No:
- 50–60%

Proposition 119 results by county
Yes:
- 50–60%
- 60–70%
No:
- 50–60%

Proposition 120 results by county
No:
- 50–60%
- 60–70%
- 70–80%

Proposition 121 results by county
No:
- 60–70%
- 70–80%

Proposition 204 results by county
No:
- 50–60%
- 60–70%
- 70–80%
