= Bill Mundell =

American politician

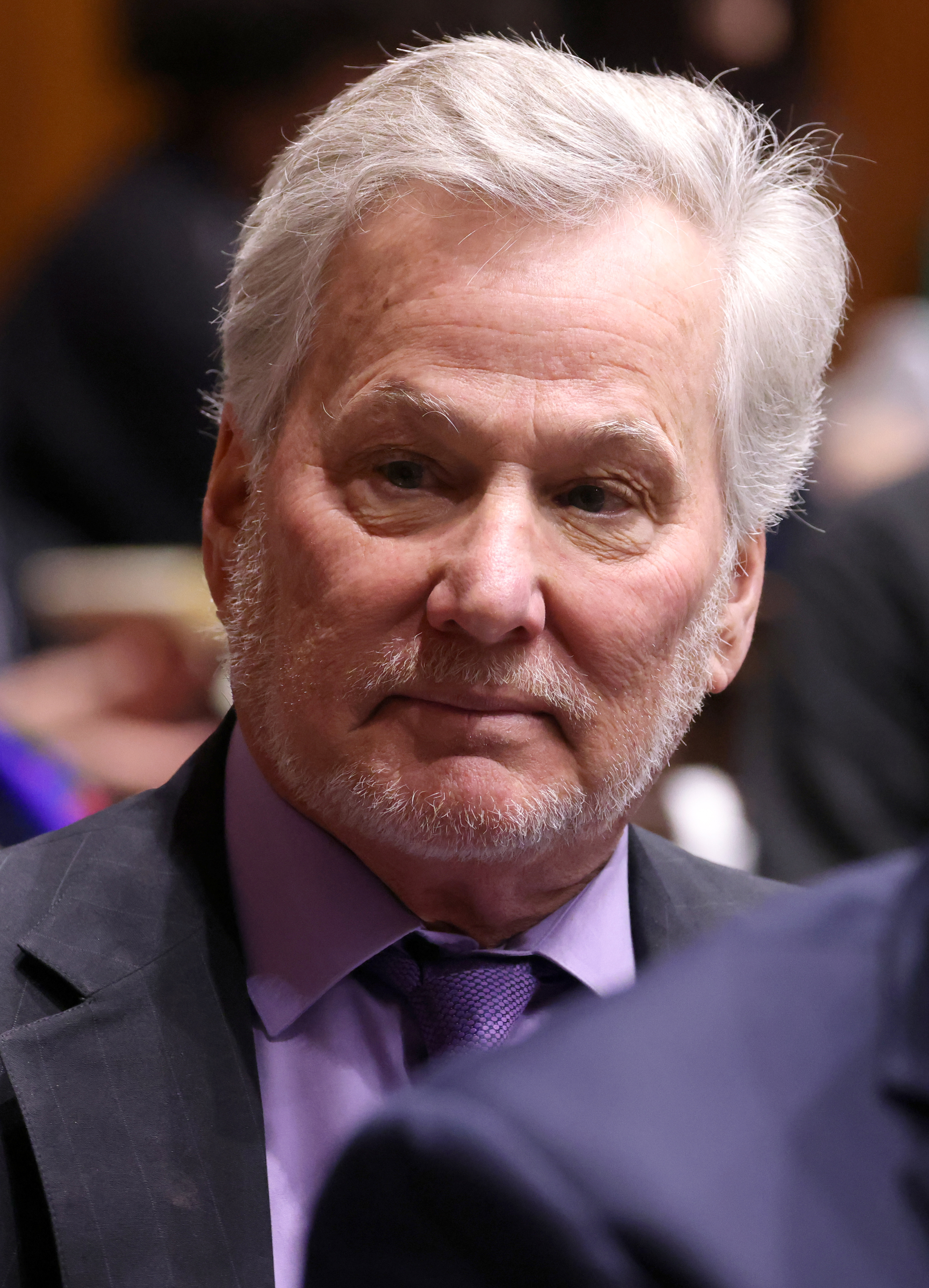
- Mundell in 2025

Member of the Arizona Corporation Commission
- In office 1999–2009

Member of the Arizona House of Representatives from the 30th district
- In office 1986–1992 Serving with Mark Killian
- Preceded by: James Sossaman
- Succeeded by: Jeff Groscost

Personal details
- Born: Anchorage, Alaska
- Party: Democratic; Republican (formerly)
- Education: Arizona State University (BA); St. Mary's University, Texas (JD)

William A. Mundell is an American politician who served as a member of the Arizona Corporation Commission from 1999 until 2009 and in the Arizona House of Representatives from 1986 to 1992 as a Republican. He left the party and ran for the former position in 2016, 2018, and 2020 as a Democrat.

== Early life and education ==
Mundell was born at Elmendorf Air Force Base in Anchorage, Alaska. His family moved to Arizona from Illinois in 1968. He graduated from Arizona State University with a Bachelor of Arts in political science in 1974 and a Juris Doctor from St. Mary's University, Texas in 1977.

== Political career ==
Mundell practiced law in Chandler until he served as presiding judge of the Chandler Municipal Court from 1980 to 1986.

He resigned from the role to successfully run for the Arizona House of Representatives for the 30th district in 1986, succeeding James Sossaman and serving alongside Mark Killian. He chaired the House Environment Committee, where he sponsored legislation promoting protecting nature and recycling.

He retired to run for the U.S. House of Representatives in 1992.

In 1999, governor Jane Dee Hull appointed Mundell to the Arizona Corporation Commission. In 2006, Mundell co-authored renewable energy standards seeking to promote renewable energy in the state.

== Party switch and later runs for office ==
=== 2016 ===
Mundell ran for his former position on the commission as a Democrat in 2016. Save Our AZ Solar, a group linked to SolarCity spent most of its $2.4 million into backing Mundell. He ultimately lost to Republican candidates Bob Burns, Andy Tobin, and Boyd Dunn in the general election.

=== 2018 ===
Two years later, in 2018, he sought the position again but did not advance from the Democratic primary election, placing behind Sandra Kennedy and Kiana Sears respectively.

=== 2020 ===
He again ran for a position on the board in 2020, pledging to strengthen accountability on the board. He ultimately placed fifth in the general election.

== Electoral history ==
=== 2018 ===
2018 Arizona Corporation Commission Democratic primary election
Party	Candidate	Votes	%
Democratic	Sandra Kennedy	351,561	45.1
Democratic	Kiana Sears	219,011	28.1
Democratic	William "Bill" Mundell	208,941	26.8
Total votes		779,513	100.0
