= 2016 Arizona elections =

- November 8, 2016

The general election was held in the U.S. state of Arizona on November 8, 2016, as part of the 2016 General Election. Arizona voters chose 11 electors to represent them in the Electoral College via a popular vote. Also three seats on the Arizona Corporation Commission were up for election, as well as all of Arizona's nine seats in the United States House of Representatives and one seat for the United States Senate. Primary elections were held in August 2016.

== US President ==
Republican candidate Donald Trump won Arizona by defeating Hillary Clinton and earned 11 electoral votes, although the state swung towards the Democrats significantly compared to 2012.

== US Senate ==
Republican incumbent John McCain defeated Democratic challenger Ann Kirkpatrick.

== House of Representatives ==
All of Arizona's nine seats in the United States House of Representatives were up for election in 2016. Republicans won 5 seats, while Democrats took 4. No seat changed hands.

== Corporation Commission ==
2016 Arizona Corporation Commission election
- November 8, 2016
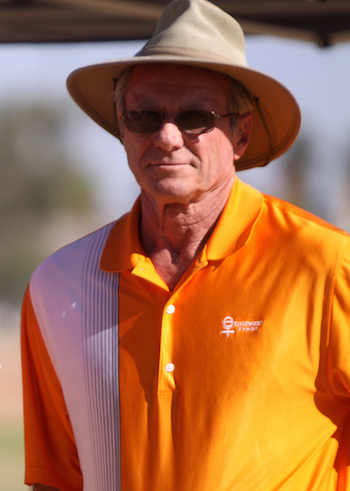

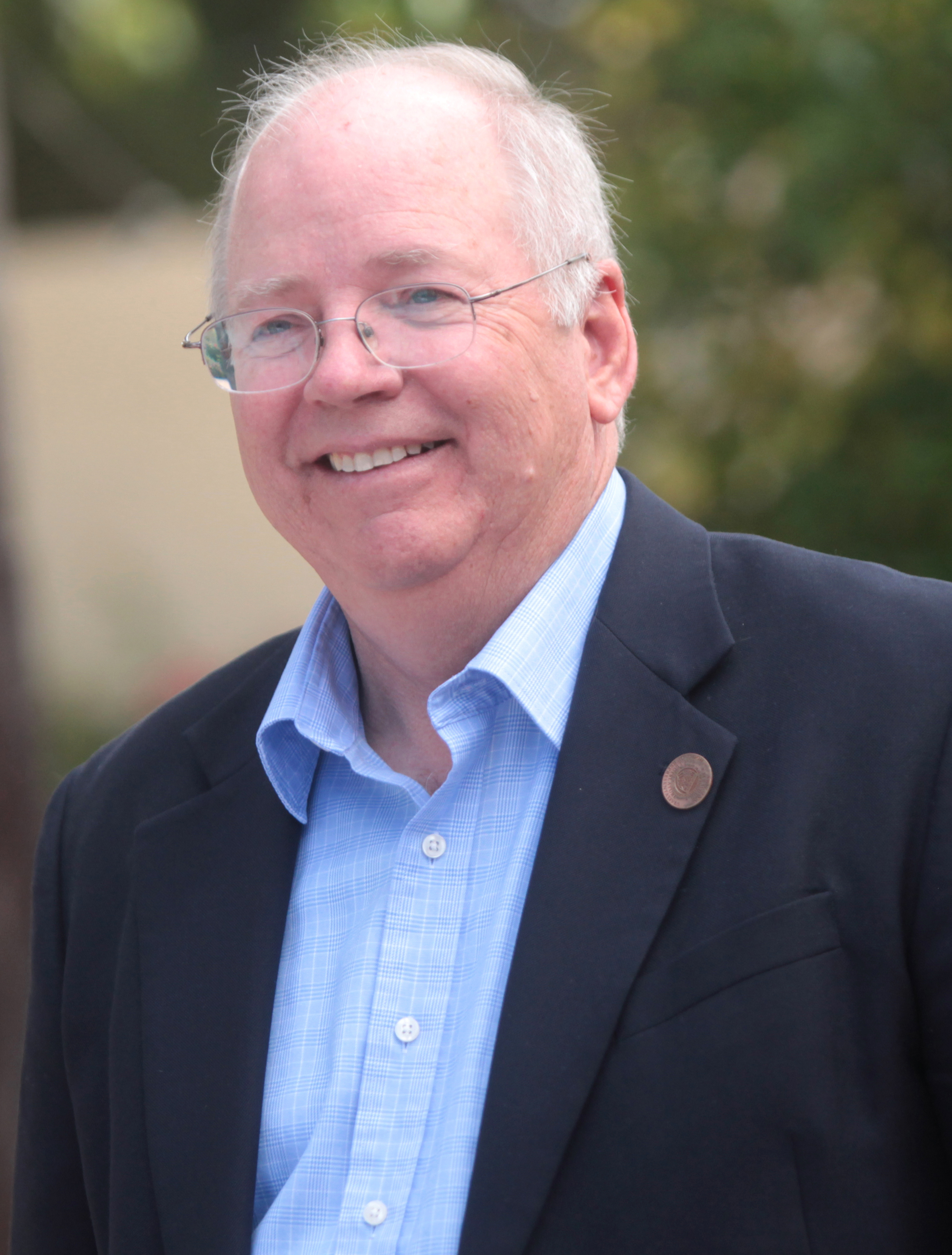

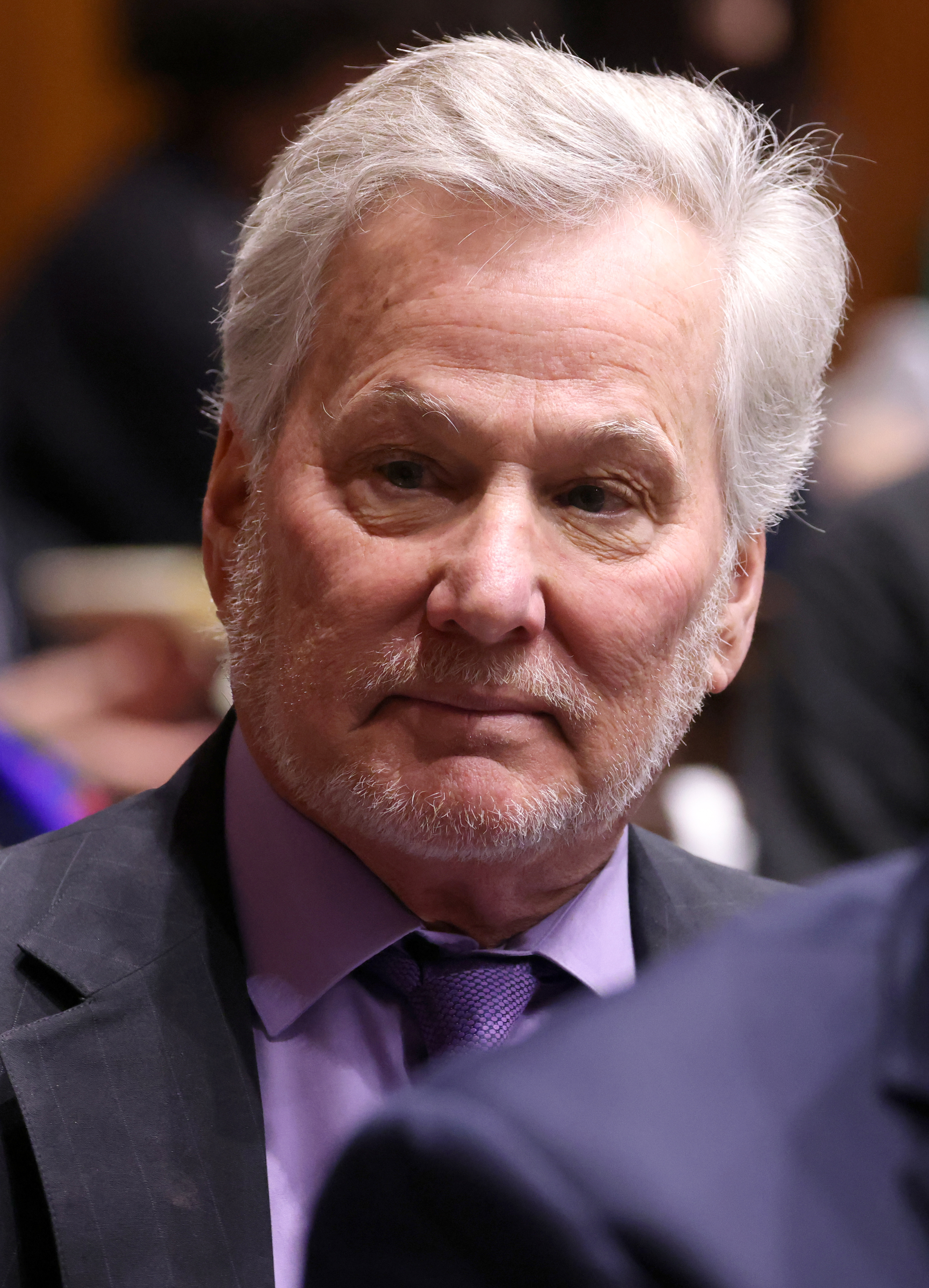

Nominee	Bob Burns	Andy Tobin	Boyd Dunn
Party	Republican	Republican	Republican
Popular vote	1,208,002	1,122,849	1,061,094
Percentage	22.35%	20.77%	19.63%
Nominee	Bill Mundell	Tom Chabin
Party	Democratic	Democratic
Popular vote	1,024,501	988,666
Percentage	18.96%	18.29%
Commissioners before election
Bob Burns (R)
Andy Tobin (R)
Bob Stump (R)
Elected Commissioners
Bob Burns (R)
Andy Tobin (R)
Boyd Dunn (R)

Three seats on the Arizona Corporation Commission were up for election. Republican Bob Stump was term-limited and ineligible to run for re-election to a third term in office.

=== Republican primary ===
==== Candidates ====
- Bob Burns, incumbent commissioner.
- Al Melvin, former state senator.
- Rick Gray, state representative.
- Andy Tobin, incumbent commissioner.
- Boyd Dunn, former mayor of Chandler, Arizona.

==== Results ====
Republican primary results
Party	Candidate	Votes	%
Republican	Bob Burns (incumbent)	279,348	23.85%
Republican	Andy Tobin (incumbent)	270,738	23.11%
Republican	Boyd Dunn	221,855	18.94%
Republican	Rick Gray	211,718	18.07%
Republican	Al Melvin	187,772	16.03%
Total votes		1,171,431	100%

=== Democratic primary ===
==== Candidates ====
- Tom Chabin, former Coconino County supervisor and legislator.
- Bill Mundell, former Republican lawmaker and commissioner.

=== General election ===
2016 Arizona Corporation Commission election
Party	Candidate	Votes	%
Republican	Bob Burns (incumbent)	1,208,002	22.35%
Republican	Andy Tobin (incumbent)	1,122,849	20.77%
Republican	Boyd Dunn	1,061,094	19.63%
Democratic	Bill Mundell	1,024,501	18.96%
Democratic	Tom Chabin	988,666	18.29%
Total votes		5,405,112	100%
Republican hold			
Republican hold			
Republican hold			

== State Legislature ==
All 30 members of the Arizona State Senate and all 60 members of the Arizona House of Representatives were up for election. Democrats flipped one state senate district and netted one state house seat.

=== State Senate ===
Party	Before	After	Change
Republican	18	17	▼1
Democratic	12	13	▲1
Total	30	30	

=== House of Representatives ===
Party	Before	After	Change
Republican	36	35	▼1
Democratic	24	25	▲1
Total	60	60	

== Supreme Court ==
Results by county Yes: 70–80%; 80–90%

One justice on the Arizona Supreme Court was up for retention - Justice Ann Timmer was appointed by Governor Jan Brewer in 2012 after outgoing justice Andrew D. Hurwitz became a federal judge on the Ninth Circuit.

Justice Timmer retention, 2016
Choice	Votes	%
For	1,338,576	76.71
Against	406,311	23.29
Total	1,744,887	100.00
Source: Arizona Secretary of State

== Ballot initiatives ==
Arizona had four statewide ballot propositions in 2016, two in May and two in November.

=== Proposition 123 ===
Results by county Yes: 60–70%; 50–60%; No: 50–60%

The Arizona Education Finance Amendment would increase education funding by $3.5 billion over 10 years.

Proposition 123
Choice	Votes	%
For	536,365	50.92
Against	516,949	49.08
Total	1,053,314	100.00
Source: Arizona Secretary of State

=== Proposition 124 ===
Results by county Yes: 70–80%; 60–70%

The Public Retirement Benefits Amendment would allow the state legislature to modify public retirement benefits for future employees and to replace the benefit system with a compounding cost of living adjustment.

Proposition 124
Choice	Votes	%
For	719,554	70.42
Against	302,195	29.58
Total	1,021,749	100.00
Source: Arizona Secretary of State

=== Proposition 205 ===
Results by county Yes: 50–60%; No: 60–70%; 50–60%

The Arizona Marijuana Legalization Initiative would legalize marijuana for individuals older than 21 years of age.

Proposition 205
Choice	Votes	%
For	1,233,323	48.68
Against	1,300,344	51.32
Total	2,533,667	100.00
Source: Arizona Secretary of State

=== Proposition 206 ===
Results by county Yes: 70–80%; 60–70%; 50–60%

The Minimum Wage and Paid Time Off Initiative would raise the minimum wage and introduce paid sick leave.

Proposition 206
Choice	Votes	%
For	1,465,639	58.33
Against	1,046,945	41.67
Total	2,512,584	100.00
Source: Arizona Secretary of State
