= Chispa AZ =

CHISPA Arizona is a Latinx-run grassroots organization focused on increasing the involvement of Latinx members of Arizona communities in environmental advocacy and action. The organization focuses on working for clean water and air, as well as safety from fatally high temperatures.

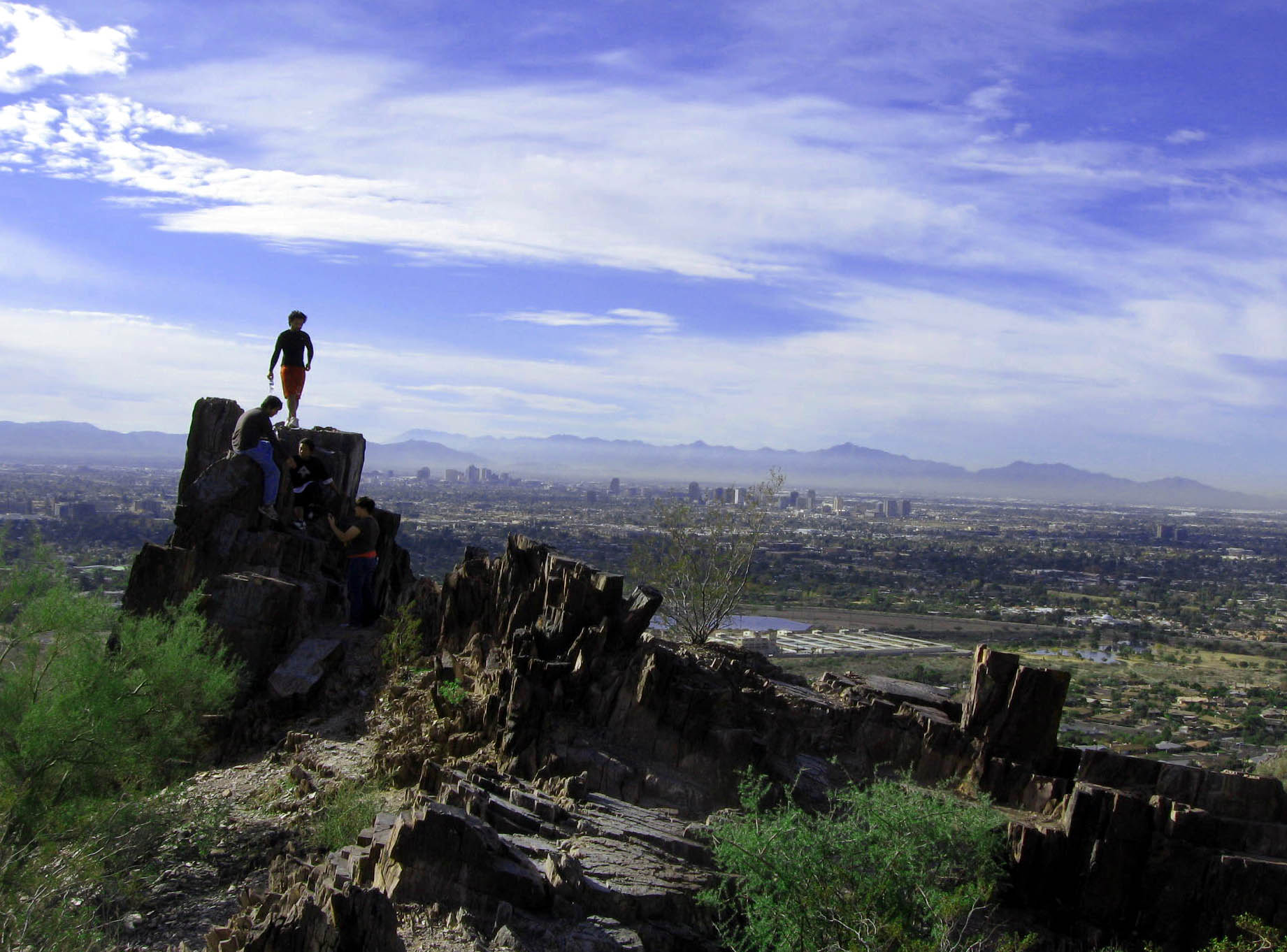
An example of a hiking trail overlooking the city of Phoenix.

Politically, it puts its focus on pressuring politicians via protests and sustained attention on the actions of elected officials even outside of election season. It is mainly based in the city of Phoenix, Arizona, a city in which over 40% of the population are Latinx. The organization operates by encouraging community participation, which they pursue by working with students and community volunteers alike through the frequent community-focused events they hold, called "entry points." "Entry points," so called because they represent a way of "entry" into the topic of climate issues and climate action for those who may be unfamiliar, are events in which education on environmental issues is cultivated through experience, typically by providing community members with access to outdoor activities they may have not otherwise participated in, such as organizing wilderness hikes, trash pick-ups, and building community gardens. They also organize their action into campaigns.

== Campaigns ==
CHISPA Arizona has three core campaigns:

=== Clean and Green campaign ===
The goal of this campaign is to protect preexisting green spaces as well as foster the creation of new ones within urban spaces. Tied to this is their push for more robust and available public transportation networks to be constructed in and between urban areas. In addition to advocating politically for this goal, CHISPA Arizona attempts to further this idea through their trash pick-ups and community gardening efforts.

=== Votando y Plantando campaign ===
Another major political goal of CHISPA Arizona is the increase in Latinx voter registration and voter turnout. Social minorities, including Latinx, in Arizona are less likely to be registered to vote and less likely to be represented in elections, a fact that this campaign aims to change.

=== Holding Arizona Corporation Commission Accountable campaign ===
This campaign centers on raising awareness of the actions of the Arizona Corporation Commission, an elected group of public officials that manage and regulate the privately owned utility companies operating within Arizona and manage and regulated Arizona's pipelines and railroads, among other things. They attempt to do this through protests and education campaigns.
