= Lea Márquez Peterson =

American politician

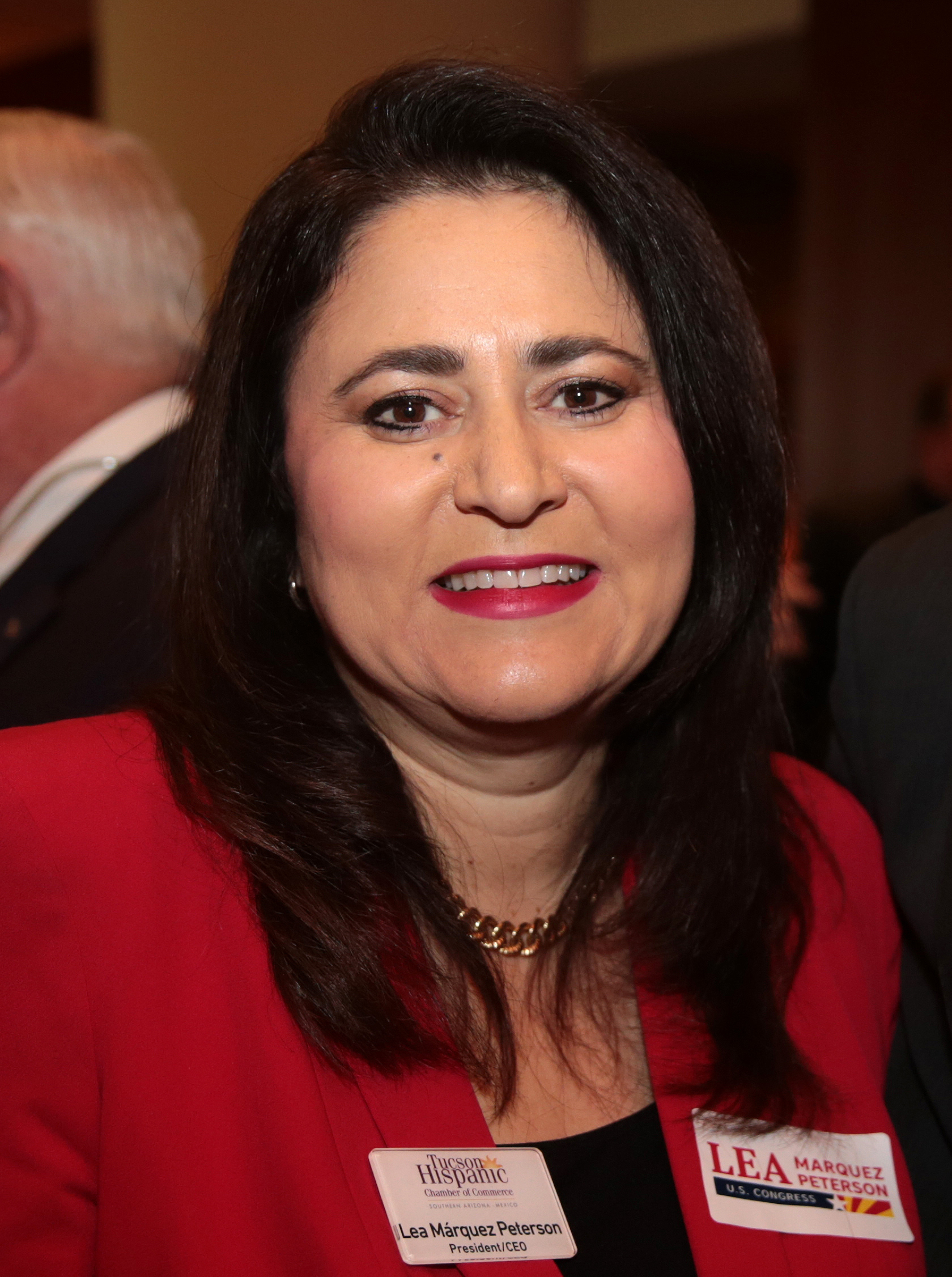
- Peterson in 2018

Member of the Arizona Corporation Commission
- Incumbent
- Assumed office May 30, 2019
- Preceded by: Andy Tobin

Personal details
- Born: January 19, 1970 (age 56) Santa Fe, New Mexico, U.S.
- Party: Republican
- Education: University of Arizona (BS); Pepperdine University (MBA)

Lea Márquez Peterson is an American politician who has been on the Arizona Corporation Commission since 2019. Peterson was appointed by Governor Doug Ducey to replace Andy Tobin following his appointment as director of the Arizona Department of Administration. She won statewide reelection to the Commission in 2020 and in 2024, and served as the Chairwoman of the Commission from 2020 to 2022. Peterson was also the 2018 Republican nominee for Arizona's 2nd Congressional District in the U.S. House.

Peterson received her undergraduate degrees in marketing and entrepreneurship from the University of Arizona, and her MBA from Pepperdine University. From 2009 to 2018, Peterson was CEO of the Tucson Hispanic Chamber of Commerce.

Peterson is the first Hispanic woman to hold statewide office in Arizona.

Peterson has been recognized as the 2022 United States Hispanic Business Woman of the Year by the United States Hispanic Chamber of Commerce. She has also been recognized as a 2021 Most Influential Woman of the Year by AZ Big Media.

Peterson and her husband live in Tucson, Arizona with their two children.

== Electoral history ==
Arizona’s 2nd congressional district election, 2018
Party	Candidate	Votes	%	±%
Democratic	Ann Kirkpatrick	161,000	55%	+12%
Republican	Lea Marquez Peterson	133,083	45%	−12%
Turnout		294,152	100%	+12%

Arizona Corporation Commission election, 2020
Party	Candidate	Votes	%
Democratic	Anna Tovar	1,450,194	17.5
Republican	Lea Márquez Peterson (incumbent)	1,449,963	17.5
Republican	James O'Connor	1,434,236	17.3
Republican	Eric Sloan	1,379,804	16.7
Democratic	Bill Mundell	1,295,836	15.7
Democratic	Shea Stanfield	1,264,909	15.3
Independent	Christina Gibson (write-in)	411	0.0
Republican	Patrick Finerd (write-in)	232	0.0
Total votes		8,275,585	100.0

Political offices
Preceded by Andy Tobin	Member of the Arizona Corporation Commission; 2019–present	Incumbent
