= Rene Lopez (politician) =

American politician

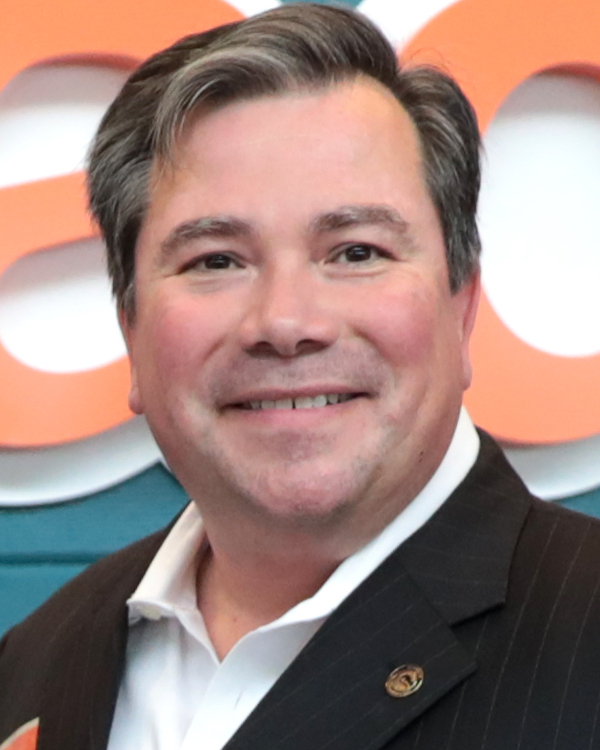

Member of the Arizona Corporation Commission
- Incumbent
- Assumed office January 2, 2025
- Preceded by: James O'Connor

Personal details
- Born: Mesa, Arizona, U.S.
- Party: Republican
- Education: University of Arizona (BS)

Rene Lopez is an American politician who currently serves on the Arizona Corporation Commission, first being elected in the 2024 election. Prior to his election to the commission, Lopez served on the Chandler City Council from 2015 to 2023. He was a candidate for Arizona's 4th congressional district in 2022

== Career ==
Lopez was born in Mesa, Arizona, and graduated from Dobson High School. He received a bachelor's degree in Nuclear Engineering from the University of Arizona in 1995. He served in the U.S. Navy from 1995 to 2000, and served as a naval officer.

Political offices
Preceded by James O'Connor	Member of the Arizona Corporation Commission; 2025–present	Incumbent
