= James O'Connor (Arizona politician) =

American politician

Jim O'Connor
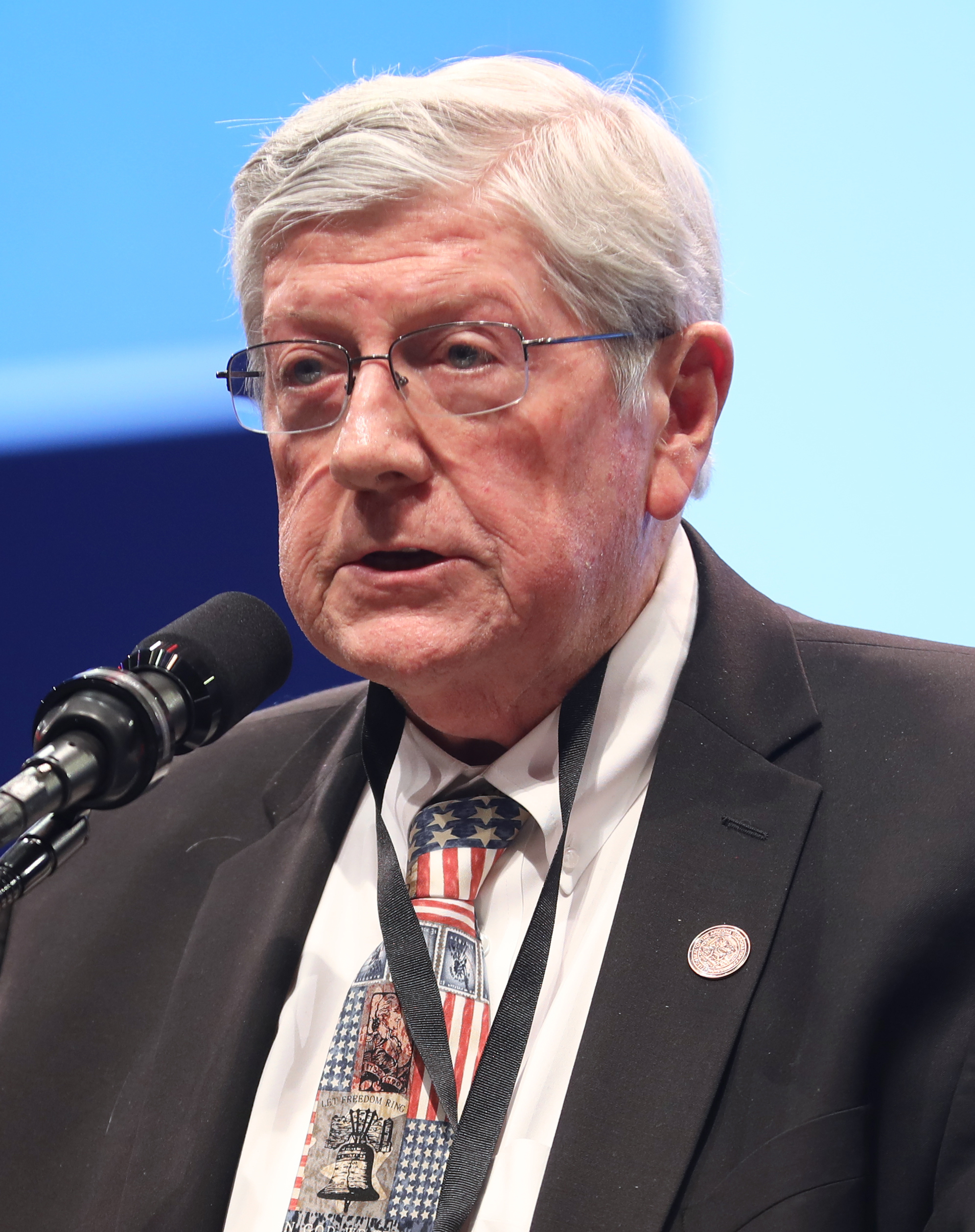

Member of the Arizona Corporation Commission
- In office January 11, 2021 – January 6, 2025
- Preceded by: Boyd Dunn
- Succeeded by: Rene Lopez

Personal details
- Born: January 19, 1946 (age 80)
- Party: Republican
- Education: Christian Brothers University (BS)

James O'Connor, better known by the name Jim O'Connor, is an American politician, elected to the Arizona Corporation Commission in 2020.

Before entering politics, O'Connor worked for 42 years in the securities industry, owning his own firm, Nexus Financial Services. In 1994, O'Connor served as an advisor to the California Senate on rules to govern state investment pools. In 2024, O'Connor lost to Gina Swoboda in an election to become chairman of the Arizona Republican Party. He received 33% of the vote to Swoboda's 67%.

== Electoral history ==
- 2018: O'Connor ran for the Corporation Commission, losing the Republican primary to Justin Olson and Rodney Glassman.
- 2020: After Boyd Dunn failed to receive enough petition signatures to run for reelection to the commission, O'Connor launched a write-in campaign, receiving enough votes in the primary to secure a spot on the ballot in the general election. O'Connor, along with Republican incumbent Lea Márquez Peterson and Democrat Anna Tovar were elected to the commission.

== Comments on vaccines ==
On May 10, 2021 Business Insider reported that O'Connor claimed that the covid vaccine turns people into "potted plants". O'Connor told the Arizona Republic that "many people who have taken the shot, many thousands of people here in the US, are deceased. And the deceased part is the good news. And please don't take that out of context."

Political offices
Preceded by Boyd Dunn	Member of the Arizona Corporation Commission; 2021–2025	Succeeded by Rene Lopez
