= Paul Newman (politician) =

American politician

Member of the Arizona Corporation Commission
- In office January 5, 2009 – 2013
- Succeeded by: Bob Burns

Member of the Arizona House of Representatives from the 8th district
- In office January 1993 – January 1999
- Preceded by: Mike Palmer
- Succeeded by: Mark Maiorana

Personal details
- Born: February 8, 1954 (age 72) New Jersey
- Party: Democratic
- Education: University of Maryland, College Park (BA); California Western School of Law (JD)
- Occupation: Politician, Attorney

Paul Newman (born February 8, 1954) is a former member of the Arizona Corporation Commission.

== Education ==
He earned a B.A. in Behavioral and Social Science from the University of Maryland, College Park, a Master in Public Administration and a Master in Judicial Administration from University Southern California, and a Juris Doctor from California Western School of Law.

== Career ==
Before moving to Arizona in 1988, he was an administrator, researcher, and consultant with the California court system where he served as Court Management Consultant for the National Center for State Courts, California Supreme Court, Los Angeles Municipal Court, Sacramento Municipal Court and San Diego Superior Court from 1976 through 1986.

Newman served three terms as an Arizona state representative, representing Santa Cruz, Greenlee, Cochise, and Graham counties from 1993-1998. In 1998 he ran for a seat on the three-member Arizona Corporation Commission, which is the state's utilities regulator. He lost to Republican Tony West. Subsequently, he was elected to as a Cochise County Supervisor while living in Bisbee, Arizona. In 2008, during his second term as County Supervisor, he launched another campaign for the Arizona Corporation Commission and won. He lost re-election to the post in 2012.

=== 2008 Corporation Commission Race ===
Paul Newman's name on the campaign sign for the Solar Team

During Newman's second campaign for Corporation Commission, in 2008, he and two other Democrats advanced past the primary election. Along with Sam George and Sandra Kennedy, Newman campaigned on bringing renewable solar energy to Arizona. Newman was endorsed by The Arizona Republic and the Tucson Citizen and by multiple elected officials such as Congressmen Harry Mitchell and Ed Pastor.

Newman and Kennedy ran as clean candidates under Arizona's Clean Elections system while George ran a traditional campaign. Under Arizona's Clean Elections system, the state is required to match funds raised by traditionally funded candidates up to a certain amount. The three were dubbed The Solar Team. George contributed nearly half a million dollars of his own money and pooled this money with Newman's and Kennedy's Clean Election funds. With this strategy, the Solar Team was able to run numerous television ads and post signs all over the state of Arizona. This brought more attention than normally paid to the Corporation Commission race. Although George donated much of his own money, only Newman and Kennedy won in the General Election.

=== Later campaigns ===
Newman lost re-election to the commission in 2012. Newman sought re-election to the commission again in 2018, but failed to collect sufficient nominating signatures.

Newman is again seeking re-election to the commission in 2020.
