= Arizona Corporation Commission =

Public utilities regulator in Arizona

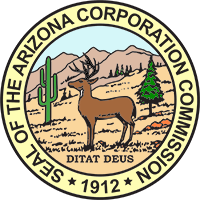
- Seal of the Corporation Commission

- Partisan makeup of the Corporation Commission

Commission overview
- Formed: 1912
- Type: Public utilities commission
- Jurisdiction: Government of Arizona
- Headquarters: Phoenix
- Employees: 223
- Annual budget: $39,509,254
- Commission executives: Kevin Thompson (R), Chairman; Lea Márquez Peterson (R), Commissioner; Nick Myers (R), Commissioner; Rene Lopez (R), Commissioner; Rachel Walden (R), Commissioner
- Website: www.azcc.gov

The Arizona Corporation Commission is the Public Utilities Commission of the state of Arizona, established by Article 15 of the Arizona Constitution. Arizona is one of only fourteen states with elected commissioners. The Arizona Constitution explicitly calls for an elected commission, as opposed to a governor-appointed commission, which is the standard in most states, because its drafters feared that governors would appoint industry-friendly officials.

The original Arizona State Constitution of 1912 established the Commission with three members serving staggered six year terms with no term limits. In 2000, Arizona voters approved Proposition 103, which expanded the Commission to five members, shortened the terms to four years, and prohibited Commissioners from serving more than two consecutive terms. Commissioners may serve additional terms, but they must be out of office for at least one full term before they become eligible again. In the event of a vacancy, the governor may appoint a new Commissioner to fill the vacancy until the next general election.

Due to its separation from the executive branch, the commission is sometimes referred to as the "fourth branch of government." However, this designation is unofficial, as Article III of the Arizona Constitution states that "[t]he powers of the government of the state of Arizona shall be divided into three separate departments, the legislative, the executive, and the judicial".

The commission has five members. As of January 2025, the commissioners are Lea Márquez Peterson, Nick Myers, Rene Lopez, Kevin Thompson, and Rachel Walden.

== Responsibilities and duties ==
The commission's scope of responsibility is generally larger than most Public Utility Commission in other states. Some of its major duties include regulating public utility companies, regulating the incorporation of businesses and organizations, securities regulation, and railroad/pipeline safety.

In January 2018, Former Speaker of the Arizona House of Representatives and Commissioner Andy Tobin proposed an energy plan that includes an 80 percent clean energy target and a 3,000 MW energy storage procurement target, which would surpass California and New York.

== Leadership ==
Each term, the Commission elects one of the Commissioners as the Chairperson. As of January 2025, the current Chairperson of the Arizona Corporation Commission is Kevin Thompson. The previous chairperson was Jim O'Connor.

== Controversies ==
Prior to January 5, 2016, the chairman was Susan Bitter Smith. She joined the commission in 2013. As of 2015, the Arizona Attorney General’s office began investigating a complaint that seeks to have Bitter Smith removed from her position due to conflict-of-interest issues. As chair of the commission, Bitter Smith is in charge of regulating the telecommunications industry. However, at the same time, she was a lobbyist for the industry, running her own public relations firm called Technical Solutions. Until recently, the company described itself on its website as a “full service government affairs company including direct federal, state and local lobbying activities with agencies ranging from the Federal Communications Commission, to the Arizona Corporation Commission, to the Arizona Legislature and Arizona municipalities.” The description from Technical Solution's website was removed after the Arizona Attorney General began investigating the complaint against her.

An attorney with the Arizona Corporation Commission, Eric Hill, quit his position in June 2016 and began a new job representing rooftop solar companies such as SolarCity at the Scottsdale, Arizona-based Rose Law Group. The law firm represented solar companies in legal battles between solar companies and the Arizona Public Services Company (APS), which is the largest and oldest electric company in Arizona. The legal battles were about net metering; the two sides argued over how much electric rates should be and how much refunds should be to homeowners running rooftop solar panels.

== Hearing Division ==
The Hearing Division, under the supervision of the Chief Hearing Officer, conducts evidentiary hearings and issues recommended orders for the Commissioners' consideration and approval. Chief Hearing Officers, since creation of the position, have been:

- 1974–1975: Lawrence J. Evans, Jr.
- 1975–1979: Andrew Wilson Bettwy
- 1979–1981: David Kennedy
- 1982–1987: Thomas Mumaw
- 1987–1992: Beth Ann Burns
- 1992–2000: Jerry Rudibaugh
- 2000–?: Jane Rodda (Acting)
- 2009–2015: Lyn Farmer
- 2015–present: Dwight Nodes

=== Regulation of public utilities ===
As part of its role in regulating public utilities, the Commission established a Renewable Energy Standard and Tariff (REST) in 2006. To provide public information related to implementation of the REST, the Commission together with the regulated electric utilities in Arizona have developed a website called Arizona Goes Solar. The authority for the Commission to establish a renewable energy standard has been challenged several times in court by the Goldwater Institute (see Miller v. Arizona Corporation Commission). The standard was most recently upheld by the Arizona Court of Appeals in April 2011.

== Past Commissioners ==
1912-2000: Three Member Commission
Election Year	Seat 1	Seat 2	Seat 3
1911 (Note: The first group of Commissioners were elected in the 1911 election, shortly before Arizona was officially admitted into the union.)	W. P. Geary (D)	A. W. Cole (D) (Note: Elected to shortened term to begin the staggering of terms for the 3-member Commission.)	F. A. Jones (D)
1914	W. P. Geary (D)	A. W. Cole (D)	F. A. Jones (D)
1916	W. P. Geary (D)	Amos A. Betts (D)	F. A. Jones (D)
1918	David F. Johnson (D)	Amos A. Betts (D)	F. A. Jones (D)
1920	David F. Johnson (D)	Amos A. Betts (D)	Loren Vaughn (D)
1922	David F. Johnson (D)	Amos A. Betts (D)	Loren Vaughn (D)
1924	W. D. Claypool (D)	Amos A. Betts (D)	Loren Vaughn (D)
1926	W. D. Claypool (D)	Amos A. Betts (D)	Loren Vaughn (D)
1928	W. D. Claypool (D)	Amos A. Betts (D)	Loren Vaughn (D)
1930	Charles R. Howe (D)	Amos A. Betts (D)	Loren Vaughn (D)
1932	Charles R. Howe (D)	Amos A. Betts (D)	Wilson T. Wright (D)
1934	Charles R. Howe (D)	W. M. Cox (D)	Wilson T. Wright (D)
1936	Amos A. Betts (D)	W. M. Cox (D)	Wilson T. Wright (D)
1938	Amos A. Betts (D)	W. M. Cox (D)	Wilson T. Wright (D)
1940	Amos A. Betts (D)	William Petersen (D)	Wilson T. Wright (D)
1942	Amos A. Betts (D) (Note: Left office before completing term, requiring a special election to fill the vacancy.)	William Petersen (D)	Wilson T. Wright (D)
1944	Amos A. Betts (D)	William Petersen (D)	Wilson T. Wright (D)
1946	Yale McFate (D) (Note: Elected to a partial term in a special election.)	William T. Brooks (D)	Wilson T. Wright (D)
1948	Mit Sims (D)	William T. Brooks (D)	Wilson T. Wright (D)
1950	Mit Sims (D)	William T. Brooks (D)	Wilson T. Wright (D)
1952	Mit Sims (D)	William T. Brooks (D)	Wilson T. Wright (D)
1954	Mit Sims (D)	John H. Barry (D)	Wilson T. Wright (D)
1956	Mit Sims (D)	John H. Barry (D)	William T. Brooks (D)
1958	George F. Senner Jr. (D)	A. P. "Jack" Buzard (D)	William T. Brooks (D)
1960	George F. Senner Jr. (D)	A. P. "Jack" Buzard (D)	William T. Brooks (D)
1962	George F. Senner Jr. (D)	A. P. "Jack" Buzard (D)	E. T. Williams (D)
1964	Milton J. Husky (D)	Dick Herbert (D)	E. T. Williams (D)
1966	Milton J. Husky (D)	Dick Herbert (D)	E. T. Williams (D)
1968	Milton J. Husky (D)	Dick Herbert (D)	Charles H. Garland (R)
1970	Russell Williams (R)	Al Faron (R)	Charles H. Garland (R)
1972	Russell Williams (R)	Al Faron (R)	Charles H. Garland (R)
1974	Ernest Garfield (R)	Al Faron (R)	Bud Tims (R)
1976	Ernest Garfield (R)	Jim Weeks (D)	Bud Tims (R)
1978	Stan Akers (R)	Jim Weeks (D)	Bud Tims (R)
1980	Diane McCarthy (R)	Jim Weeks (D)	Brian Donnely (R)
1982	Diane McCarthy (R)	Richard Kimball (D)	Brian Donnely (R)
1984	Marcia Weeks (D)	Richard Kimball (D)	Renz Jenings (D)
1986	Marcia Weeks (D)	Dale Morgan (R)	Renz Jenings (D)
1988	Marcia Weeks (D)	Dale Morgan (R)	Renz Jenings (D)
1990	Marcia Weeks (D)	Dale Morgan (R)	Renz Jenings (D)
1992	Marcia Weeks (D)	Dale Morgan (R)	Renz Jenings (D)
1994	Marcia Weeks (D)	Carl Kunasek (R)	Renz Jenings (D)
1996	Jim Irvin (R)	Carl Kunasek (R)	Renz Jenings (D)
1998	Jim Irvin (R)	Carl Kunasek (R)	Tony West (R)
2000	Jim Irvin (R)	Marc Spitzer (R)	Bill Mundel (R)

2002–Present: Five Member Commission
Election Year	Seat 1	Seat 2	Seat 3	Seat 4	Seat 5
2002	Jim Irvin (R)	Marc Spitzer (R)	Bill Mundel (R)	Jeff Hatch-Miller (R) (Note: Elected to 2-year term to begin staggering of terms for the 5-member Commission)	Mike Gleason (R)
2004	Kris Mayes (R)	Marc Spitzer (R)	Jeff Hatch-Miller (R)	Bill Mundel (R)	Mike Gleason (R)
2006	Kris Mayes (R)	Gary Pierce (R)	Jeff Hatch-Miller (R)	Bill Mundel (R)	Mike Gleason (R)
2008	Kris Mayes (R)	Gary Pierce (R)	Paul Newman (D)	Sandra Kennedy (D)	Bob Stump (R)
2010	Brenda Burns (R)	Gary Pierce (R)	Paul Newman (D)	Sandra Kennedy (D)	Bob Stump (R)
2012	Brenda Burns (R)	Gary Pierce (R)	Bob Stump (R)	Robert Burns (R)	Susan Bitter Smith (R)
2014	Doug Little (R)	Tom Forese (R)	Bob Stump (R)	Robert Burns (R)	Susan Bitter Smith (R)
2016	Doug Little (R)	Tom Forese (R)	Robert Burns (R)	Andy Tobin (R)	Boyd Dunn (R)
2018	Sandra Kennedy (D)	Justin Olson (R)	Robert Burns (R)	Andy Tobin (R)	Boyd Dunn (R)
2020	Sandra Kennedy (D)	Justin Olson (R)	Anna Tovar (D)	Lea Márquez Peterson (R)	Jim O'Connor (R)
2022	Kevin Thompson (R)	Nick Myers (R)	Anna Tovar (D)	Lea Márquez Peterson (R)	Jim O'Connor (R)
2024	Kevin Thompson (R)	Nick Myers (R)	Rachel Walden (R)	Rene Lopez (R)	Lea Márquez Peterson (R)
2026	-	-	Rachel Walden (R)	Rene Lopez (R)	Lea Márquez Peterson (R)

Notes:

Seat numbers are not formal designations, but are included to make the history easier to read. When multiple Commissioners are elected to full terms in the same election (2002–present), the informal seat order has been determined in the order of the total votes received. This list only includes the winners of regular and special elections; it does not include Commissioners appointed to fill a vacancy until the next election.

== Current Commissioners ==
Current Corporation Commissioners as of 2025 are:

Name	Since	Next Election	Party
Rene Lopez	January 6, 2025	2028	Republican
Lea Márquez Peterson	May 30, 2019 (appointed)	2028 (term limited)	Republican
Nick Myers	January 3, 2023	2026	Republican
Kevin Thompson	January 3, 2023	2026	Republican
Rachel Walden	January 6, 2025	2028	Republican

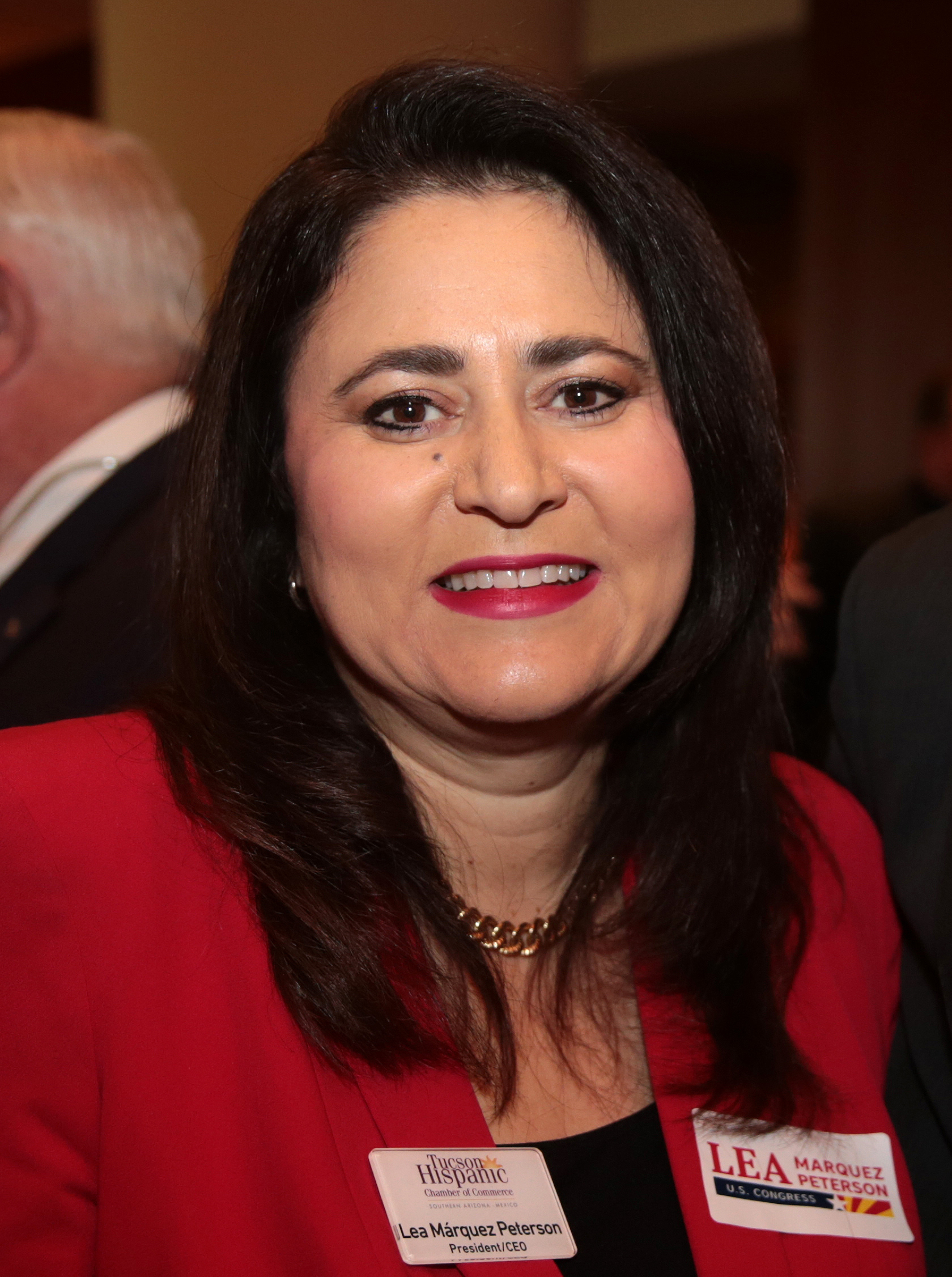
Commissioner Lea Márquez Peterson (R)

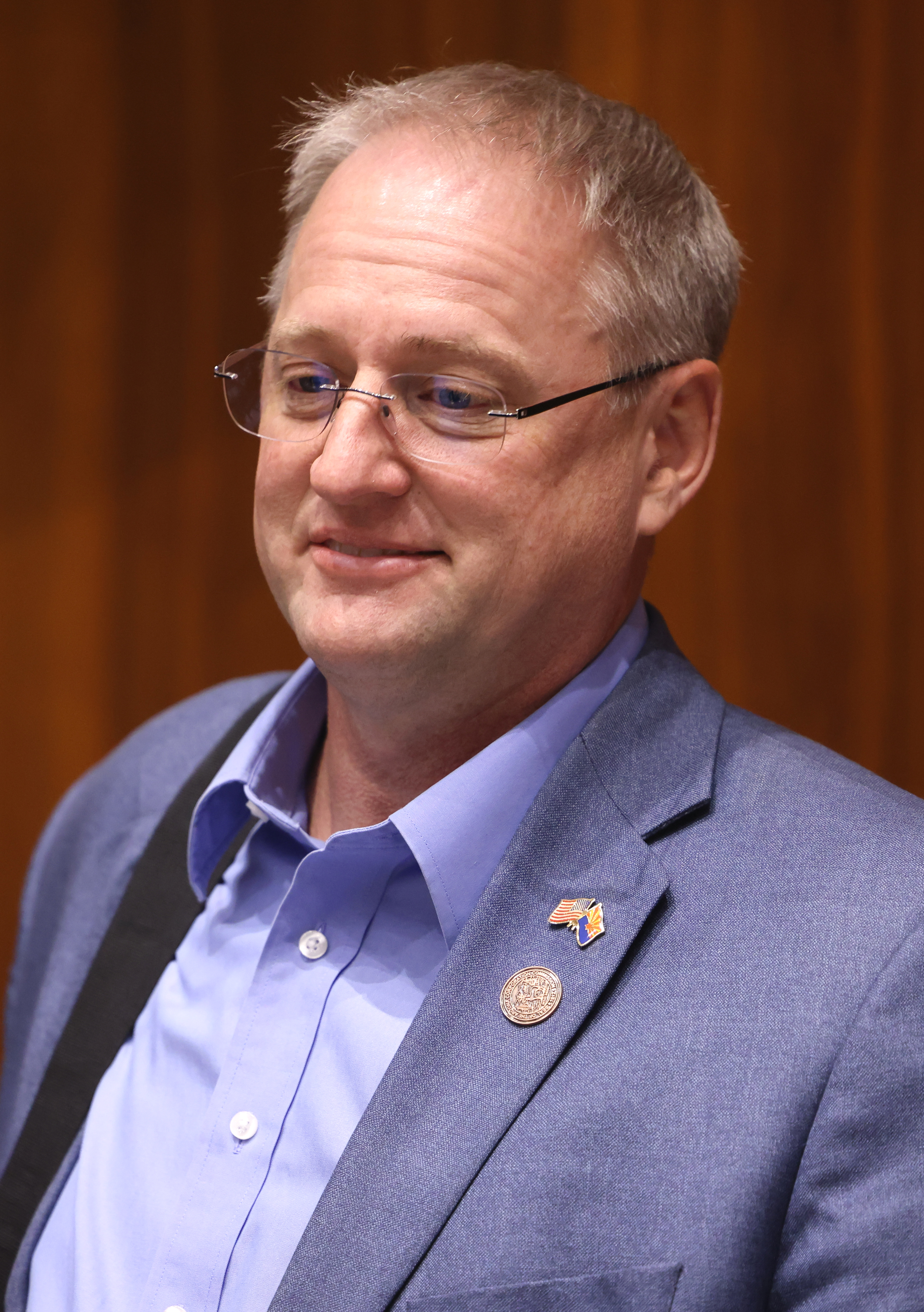
Commissioner Nick Myers (R)

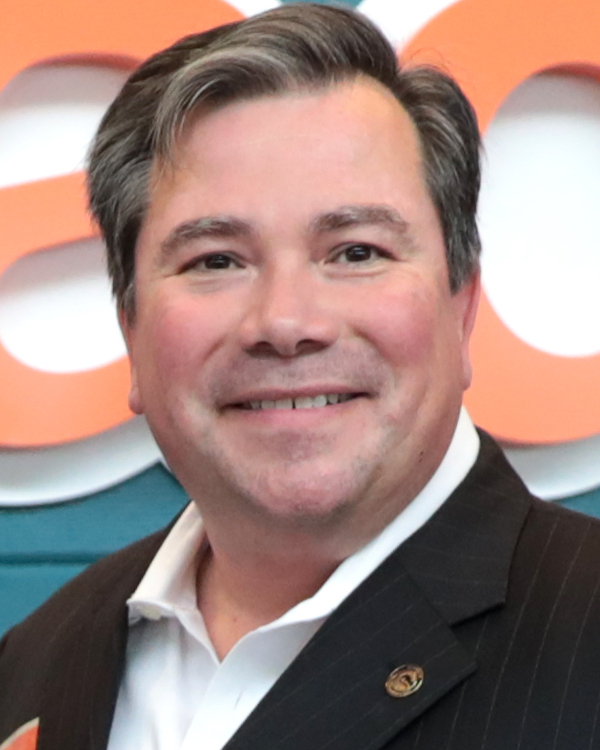
Commissioner Rene Lopez (R)

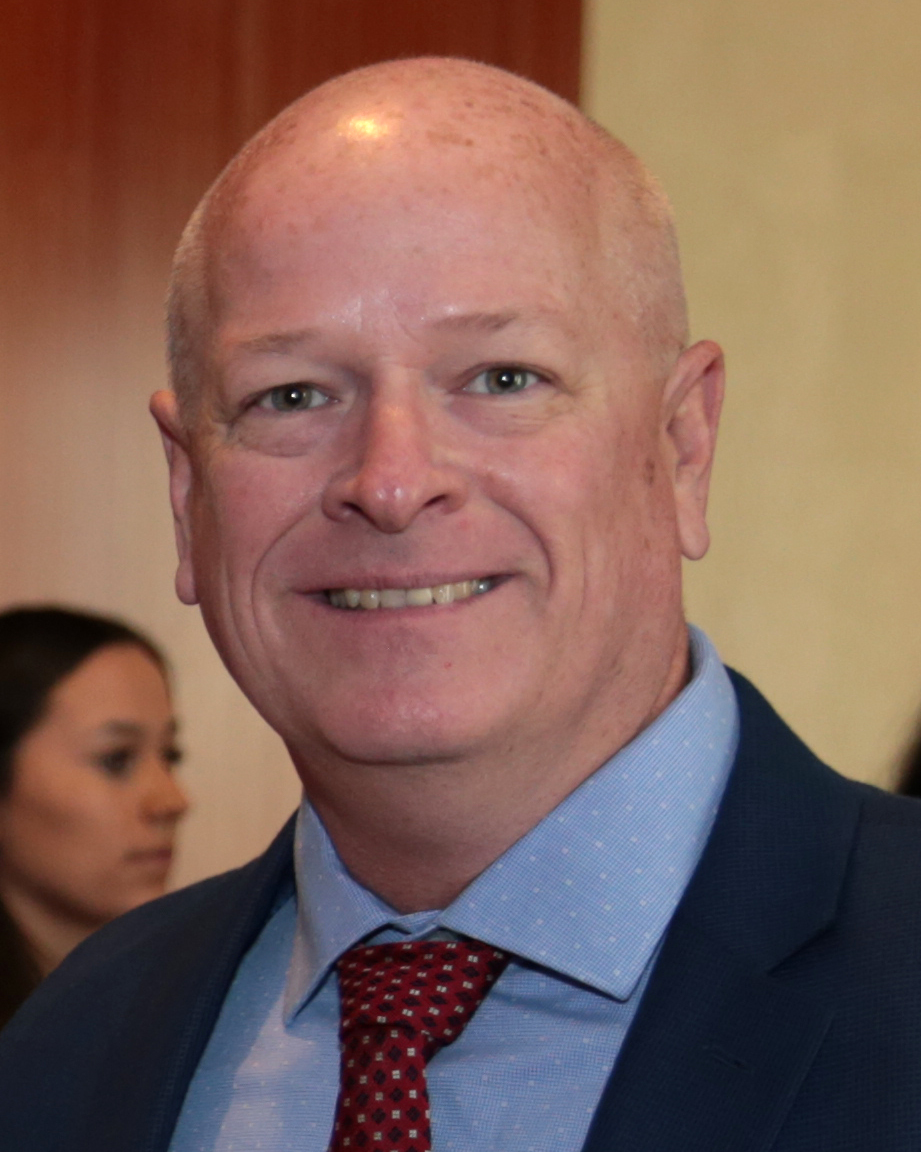
Commissioner Kevin Thompson (R)

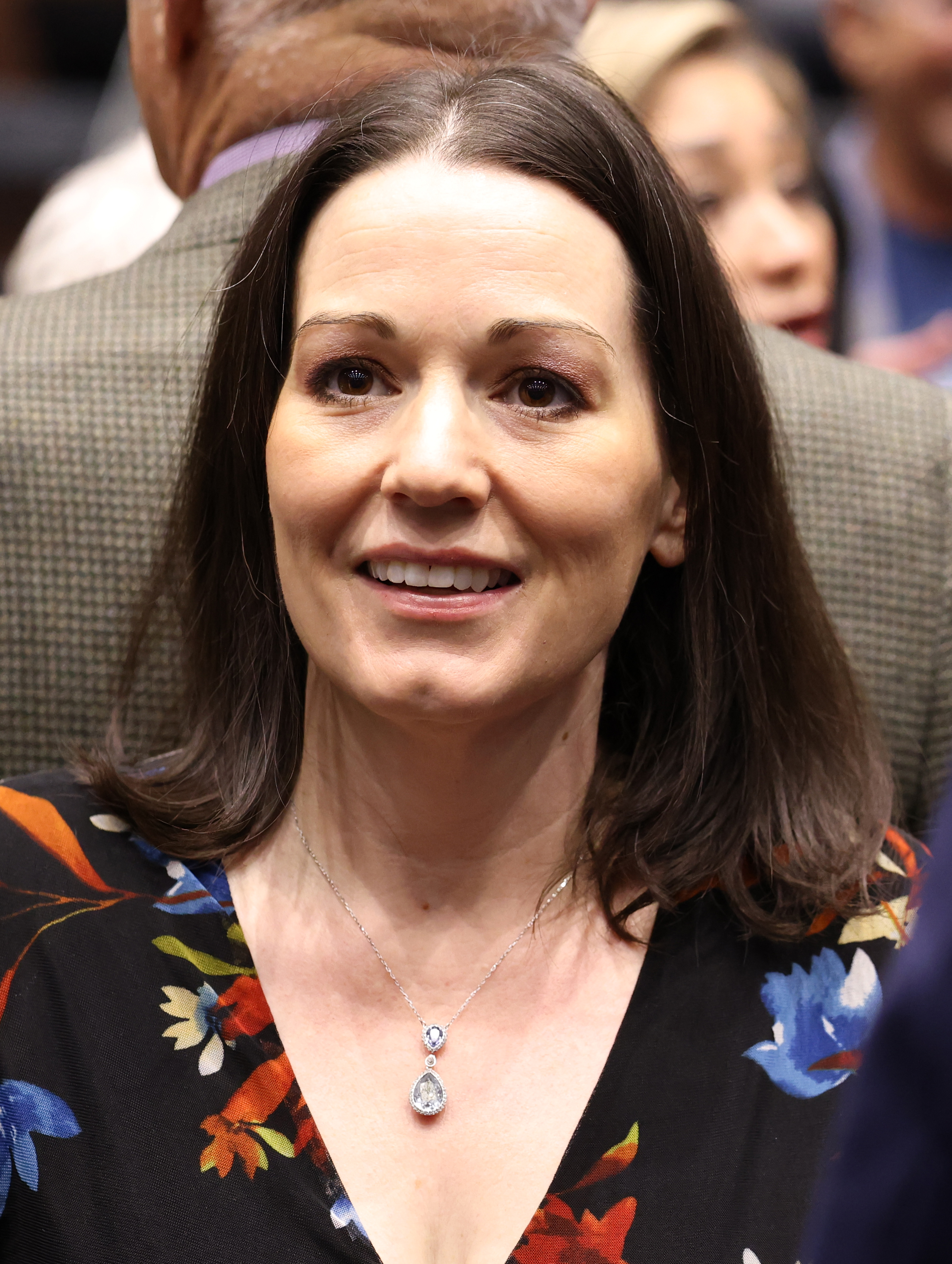
Commissioner Rachel Walden (R)

== See also ==
- List of company registers
