= Susan Bitter Smith =

American politician

Member of the Arizona Corporation Commission
- In office 2013 – January 4, 2016

President of the Central Arizona Project
- In office 2007–2013

Vice Mayor, Scottsdale, Arizona
- In office 1992–1992

City Council, Scottsdale
- In office 1988–1992

Personal details
- Born: 1955 (age 70–71) Scottsdale, Arizona
- Party: Republican
- Education: Arizona State University
- Occupation: Politician

Susan Bitter Smith (born 1955) is currently the President of Technical Solutions, and executive director of the Southwest Cable Communications Association. She is currently serving as the Governing Board President for the Maricopa County Community College District. She is a registered Republican in the state of Arizona, and has held multiple public offices. She served as Chairman of the Arizona Corporation Commission., but resigned in December 2015. Prior to serving on the ACC, she was president of the Central Arizona Project. Prior to that, she was Vice Mayor of the city of Scottsdale, Arizona. She also served as a member for American Society of Association Executives (past chair, Key Award winner, Women Who Advance Excellence award winner and fellow). Her other memberships have included service on the St. Theresa Catholic School Development Board, and presidency of the ASU Walter Cronkite Endowment Board (1998–1999) In 2025 she was named one of Arizona's Outstanding Women in Business by the Phoenix Business Journal.

== Education ==
Bitter Smith received her bachelor's degree from Arizona State University in 1977. In 1982 she graduated from Arizona State with her M.B.A. After graduating she remained active with the school as honorary chair of the ASU MBA Alumni Association. In 2003, she received the Alumni Achievement Award. She also attended Arizona State University's Law School and has served on the University's alumni board for decades.

== Previous work history ==
=== Maricopa Community College Governing Board (2020–Present) ===
She is currently serving as the Governing Board President for the Maricopa County Community College District. She represents District 2 on the board after being elected in 2020. Her current term ends in 2028.

=== President of the Central Arizona Project (2007–2011) ===
During Bitter Smith's tenure as president, she was involved with the federal finalization of the Gila River Indian Community Water Rights Settlement. This settlement was the largest Indian water rights settlement in U.S. history and went into full effect in 2008. U.S. Senator Jon Kyl was the primary sponsor of the legislation pertinent to the settlement. Bitter Smith commented on the work:

The work started during Grady Gammage's term as president and continued by Bill Perry, was finalized during my term as we finally resolved the Gila River Indian Community Water Rights Settlement...

The legislation was signed by President Bush in 2004, but was not fully implemented until "all actions necessary to complete the Gila River Indian Community Water Rights Settlement and amend the Southern Arizona Water Rights Settlement of 1982" had been accomplished.

=== Balsz Elementary School Board (2005–2008) ===
Bitter Smith served on the Balsz Elementary School Board During that time the district saw leadership and financial changes. Source:

=== President, Technical Solutions, Scottsdale, Arizona (1988–Present) ===
Bitter Smith currently serves as President of Technical Solutions, a public affairs firm based in Scottsdale, Arizona. This firm she started with her husband back in the 1980s. During her time at Technical Solutions, she and the company have been recognized as part of Arizona State University's Sun Devil 100 numerous times.

=== City Council, Scottsdale, Arizona (1988–1992) ===
Bitter Smith served as a councilmember from 1988 to 1992. During that time she participated on the Charter Review Advisory Committee, Council District Advisory Task Force, and Charter Review Task Force.

=== Southwest Cable Communications Association (1980–Present) ===
Bitter Smith is serving as the Executive Director of the Southwest Cable Communications Association. The organization represents Arizona and New Mexico cable operators. This organization started at the Arizona Cable Telecommunications Association, then expanded to eventually become the Southwest Cable Communications Association. In an interview with the Syndeo Institute, at The Cable Center, Bitter Smith shared she started out at the association right out of law school as the organization's Executive Secretary, she them became the executive director.

== Controversy ==
Bitter Smith received significant media attention regarding a complaint filed against her with Arizona Attorney General Mark Brnovich for conflict of interest. Bitter Smith announced she would be resigning from the Commission effective January 4, 2016.

=== Attorney General investigation ===
As of 2015, the Arizona Attorney General's office began investigating a complaint that seeks to have Bitter Smith removed from the Arizona Corporation Commission due to conflict-of-interest issues. As chair of the commission, Bitter Smith was in charge of regulating the utility industry. At the same time, she worked as a lobbyist for the telecommuncations industry.

She announced her resignation on December 17, effective January 4, 2016. After resigning her position over the alleged conflict of interest, Bitter Smith was not have charged by the Office of Attorney General. Citing his own real conflict of interest, Andy Tobin, Governor Doug Ducey's nominee to replace Bitter Smith on the Commission, said he would not vote on certain utility issues, having confirmed that his son-in-law works for Solar City, an electric utility the Commission regulates. Recusals on electric utility issues before the Commission could very well result in deadlocked votes and null decisions.

== See also ==
- United States House of Representatives elections in Arizona, 2010#District 5
