= Boyd Dunn =

American politician

Member of the Arizona Corporation Commission
- In office January 3, 2017 – January 11, 2021
- Preceded by: Bob Stump
- Succeeded by: Jim O'Connor

Mayor of Chandler, Arizona
- In office 2002–2011
- Preceded by: Jay Tibshraeny
- Succeeded by: Jay Tibshraeny

Personal details
- Born: Augsburg, West Germany (now Germany)
- Party: Republican
- Education: Arizona State University, Tempe (BS, JD)

Boyd Dunn is an American politician who served on the Arizona Corporation Commission, first being elected in the 2016 election. Prior to serving in the Commission, Dunn served as the mayor of Chandler, Arizona from 2002 to 2011.

Dunn also served as a superior court judge.

During the campaign, Dunn expressed doubts on the existence of climate change.

During his 2020 election for reelection to the Arizona Corporation Commission, Arizona Superior Court Judge Roger Brodman removed Dunn from the Republican primary, ending his bid for re-election after an 18-year old campaign worker admitted to forging some of the signatures on his nominating petition; there was no evidence of wrong-doing on Dunn's part. He was replaced by Republican James O'Connor who went on to win in the general election.

== See also ==
- List of mayors of Chandler

Political offices
Preceded by Bob Stump	Member of the Arizona Corporation Commission; 2017–2021	Succeeded by Jim O'Connor
Preceded by Jay Tibshraeny	Mayor of Chandler, Arizona; 2001–2011	Succeeded by Jay Tibshraeny
