= Andy Tobin =

American politician

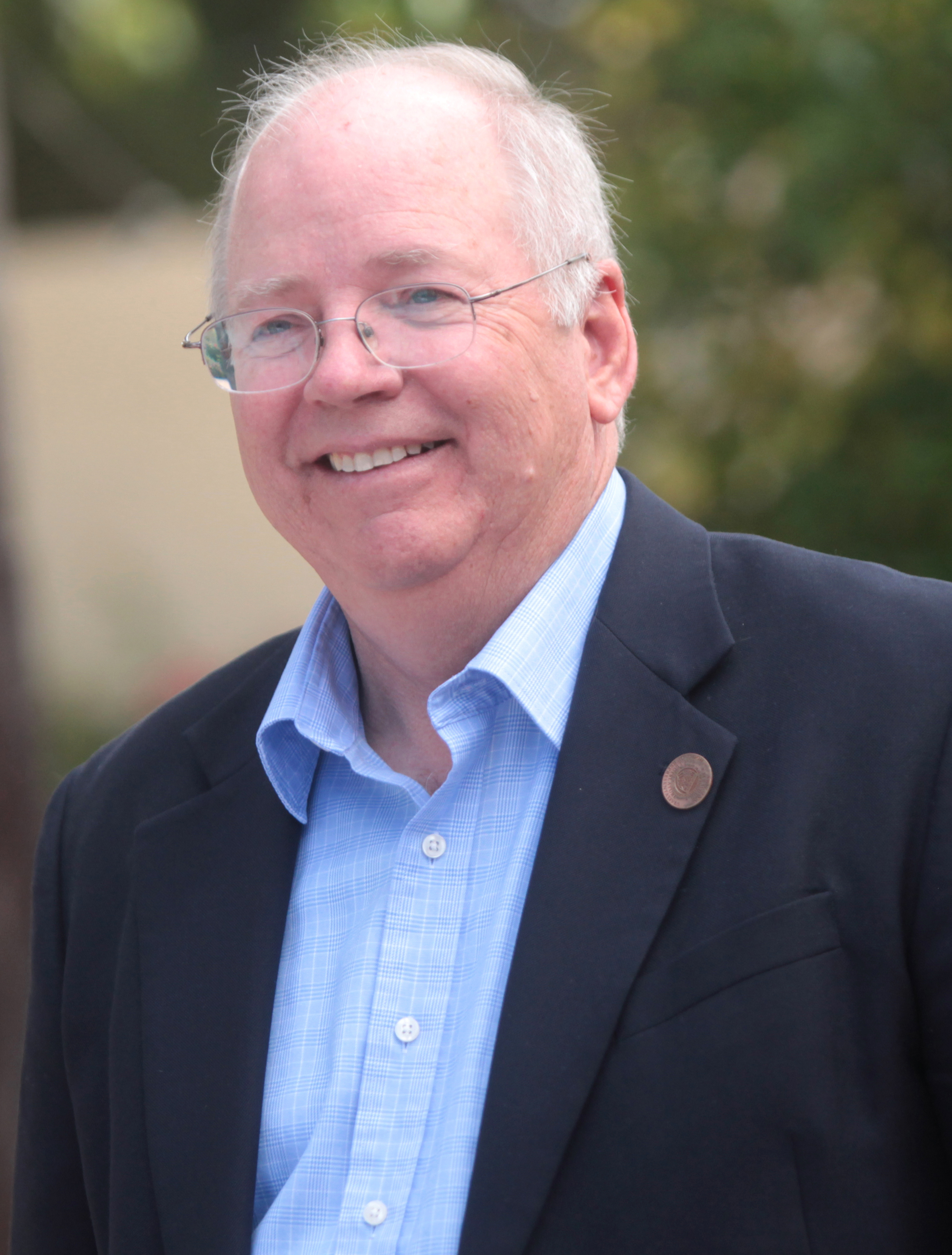
- Tobin in 2014

Member of the Arizona Corporation Commission
- In office January 4, 2016 – May 30, 2019
- Preceded by: Susan Bitter Smith
- Succeeded by: Lea Márquez Peterson

51st Speaker of the Arizona House of Representatives
- In office April 29, 2011 – January 12, 2015
- Preceded by: Kirk Adams
- Succeeded by: David Gowan

Member of the Arizona House of Representatives from the 1st district
- In office January 2007 – January 12, 2015
- Preceded by: Tom O'Halleran
- Succeeded by: Noel W. Campbell

Personal details
- Born: June 27, 1958 (age 68) New York City, New York, U.S.
- Party: Republican

Andrew Michael Tobin (born June 27, 1958) is an American business executive and former legislator who served in elected and appointed administrative positions in Arizona for nearly 20 years. He was a member of the Arizona Corporation Commission and in the Arizona House of Representatives representing the state's 1st district. He served as Speaker from 2011 to 2015. He also served as the Director of the Arizona Department of Administration.

In 2014 Tobin ran for Arizona's 1st congressional district against incumbent Ann Kirkpatrick (D), who won with 52.6% of the vote. He previously served as the appointed director of the State Department of Insurance and Interim Superintendent of the state Department of Financial Institutions. He additionally served nine months as director of the Arizona Weights and Measures Department.

Tobin ran in 2016 for reelection to the Corporation Commission, he won in the Republican primary on August 30, 2016, and in the general election.

== Biography ==
Tobin was born in 1958 as the second of six children in New York City to an Irish-American family. He is the son of a (now) retired New York City Police lieutenant. His grandparents immigrated from Ireland.

Tobin moved to Arizona in 1979, where he worked in banking and real estate lending for 13 years in the Phoenix metropolitan area. He moved to Dewey 16 years ago. He started his own employee benefit company, known as TLC Employee Benefits and Consulting. He specializes in insurance, marketing and public relations.

Tobin owned and operated a local Farmers Insurance agency for six years. He was also CEO of a local aerospace company employing 200 people for three years until 2003.

Tobin was elected the national president of the United States Junior Chamber of Commerce from 1988 to 1989. In that capacity Tobin served as ex-officio board member of the Muscular Dystrophy Association, St. Jude Children's Research Hospital and the Hugh O'Brian Youth Leadership Foundation. As president of the United States Junior Chamber, Tobin lobbied the Reagan administration and later the Bush administration for passage of the Line-Item Veto and a Balanced Budget Amendment.

== Politics ==
=== Arizona Legislature ===
Tobin was first elected to the Arizona House of Representatives in 2006. He was reelected for three more terms, in 2008, 2010 and 2012.

In 2009 Tobin was one of 14 Arizona lawmakers investigated for accepting gifts from lobbyists for the Fiesta Bowl, which is prohibited by state statutes. He was not charged with any crime.

Tobin has served as state House Majority Whip and House Majority Leader. In 2011, he was elected Speaker.

=== 2014 congressional campaign ===
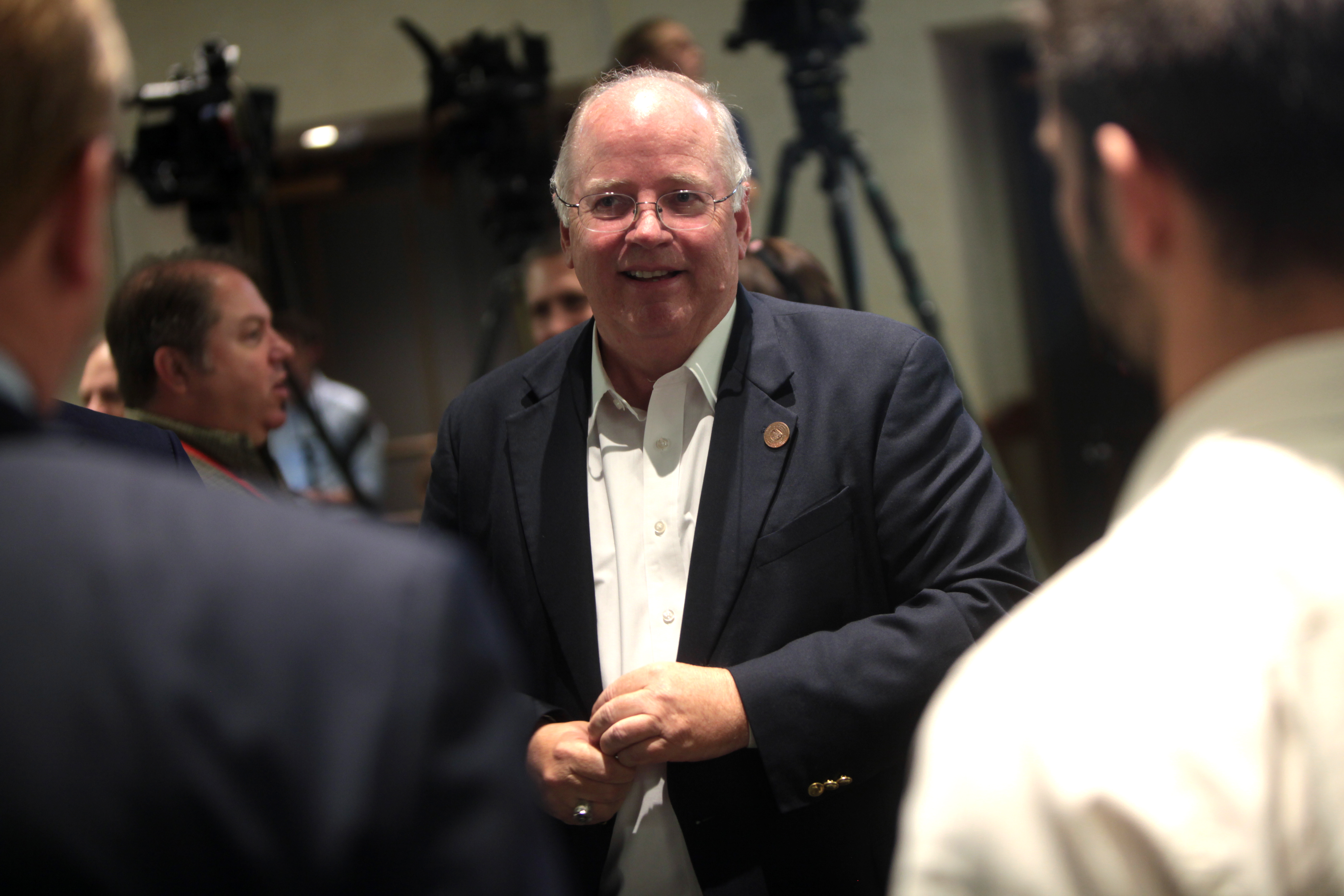
Speaker Tobin speaking at a rally in August 2014.

Tobin ran for Congress in Arizona's 1st congressional district, challenging incumbent Representative Ann Kirkpatrick (D). He was endorsed by Mitt Romney.

On August 26, 2014, in the Republican primary, Tobin faced off against State Rep. Adam Kwasman and rancher Gary Kiehne . According to Politico, Tobin was seen as the moderate candidate. The race was initially too close to call. Election results were finalized and Tobin was officially declared the primary's winner on September 2, when Kiehne conceded the race.

Tobin lost to Kirkpatrick 52.5%-47.5%.

== Personal life ==
Tobin and his wife Jennifer have five children. They have lived in their home in Paulden since 2004.

Political offices
Preceded by Kirk Adams	Speaker of the Arizona House of Representatives; 2011–2015	Succeeded by David Gowan
Preceded by Susan Bitter Smith	Member of the Arizona Corporation Commission; 2016–2019	Succeeded by Lea Márquez Peterson
