= Anna Tovar =

American politician

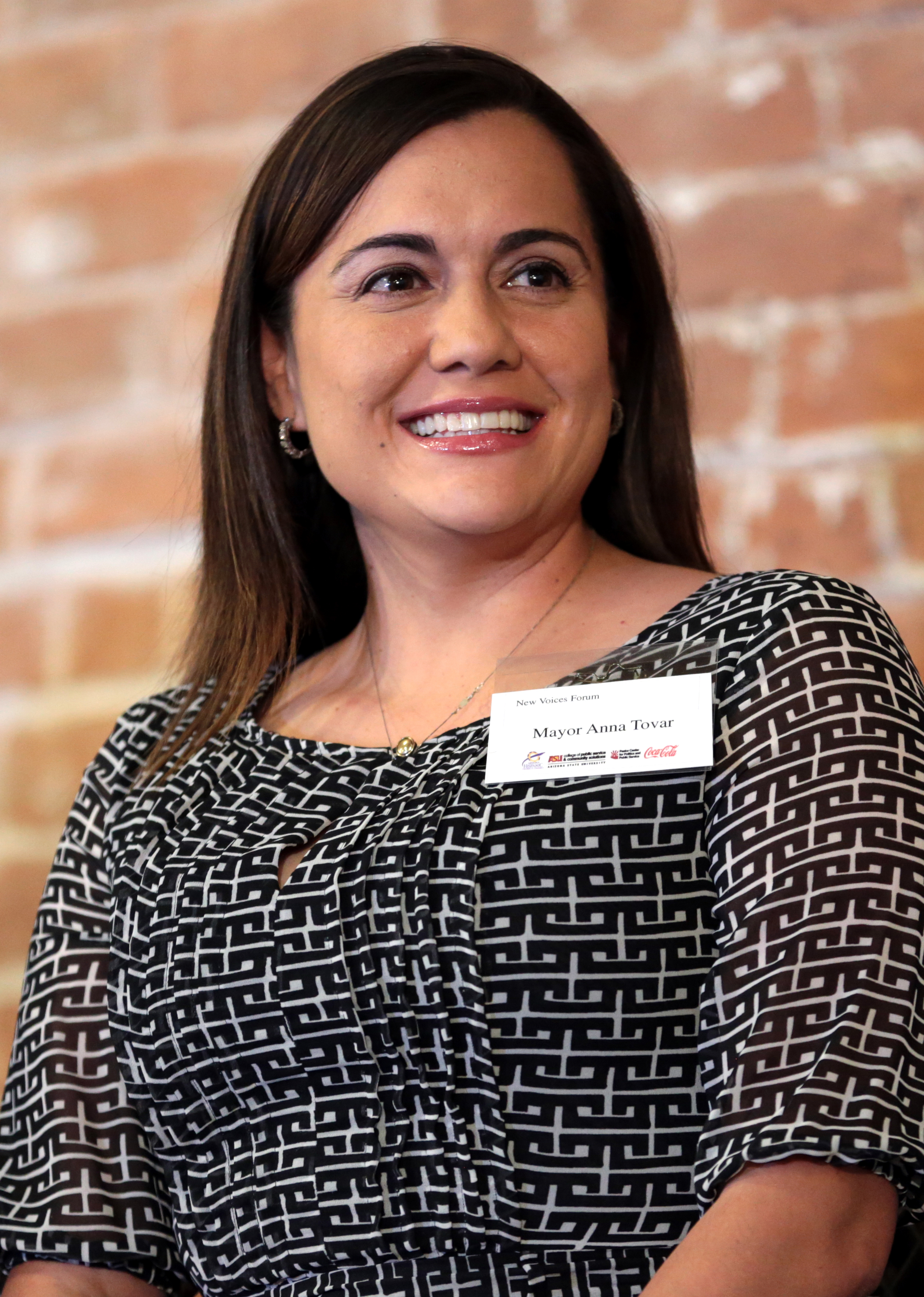
- Tovar in 2017

Member of the Arizona Corporation Commission
- In office January 11, 2021 – January 6, 2025
- Preceded by: Bob Burns
- Succeeded by: Rachel Walden

Minority Leader of the Arizona Senate
- In office October 29, 2013 – January 5, 2015
- Preceded by: Leah Landrum Taylor
- Succeeded by: Katie Hobbs

Member of the Arizona Senate from the 19th district
- In office January 14, 2013 – January 5, 2015
- Preceded by: Rich Crandall
- Succeeded by: Lupe Contreras

Member of the Arizona House of Representatives from the 13th district
- In office January 2009 – January 14, 2013
- Preceded by: Steve Gallardo
- Succeeded by: Darin Mitchell

Personal details
- Party: Democratic
- Education: Arizona State University, Tempe (BA)
- Website: Campaign website

Anna Tovar is an American politician who served as a member of the Arizona Corporation Commission from 2021 to 2025. She previously served as Mayor of Tolleson, Arizona, as State Senator representing the 19th district, and as a State Representative. She is a member of the Democratic Party.

== Personal life and education ==
Tovar was raised in Tolleson, Arizona, where she met her husband, Juan Carlos Tovar. Tovar earned a bachelor's degree in Elementary Education from Arizona State University. Before going into politics, Tovar taught kindergarten and first grade. She and her husband have two children.

In 2002, Tovar was diagnosed with a rare form of leukemia, which required her to undergo chemotherapy and two bone-marrow transplants from her brother.

== Political career ==
Before being elected to the Arizona legislature, Tovar served on the Tolleson City Council and was also Tolleson's Vice Mayor.

Tovar was elected to the Arizona House of Representatives in 2010. Tovar was elected to the Arizona Senate in 2012; she served on the Appropriations Committee and the Judiciary Committee. She was the Senate Democratic Minority Leader.

Tovar supports raising education spending, reforming the tax code, stopping the expansion of private prisons, and instituting stronger restrictions on gifts to legislators.

Tovar has been affiliated with JAG – Jobs for Arizona Graduates, WiLL/WAND – Women's Actions for New Directions, the National Association of Latino Elected and Appointed Officials, and the National Hispanic Caucus for State Legislators.

Tovar announced on February 9, 2024, that she would not seek reelection to the Corporation Commission.

Arizona Senate
Preceded by Leah Landrum Taylor	Minority Leader of the Arizona Senate; 2013–2015	Succeeded by Katie Hobbs
Political offices
Preceded by Bob Burns	Member of the Arizona Corporation Commission; 2021–2025	Succeeded by Rachel Walden
