= 2022 Arizona elections =

- November 8, 2022

The 2022 Arizona elections were held in the state of Arizona on November 8, 2022, coinciding with the nationwide general election. All six executive offices were up for election, as well as a U.S. Senate seat, all of the state's U.S. House of Representatives seats, and the state legislature.

In recent years, Arizona's status as a Republican stronghold has significantly weakened; since 2018, Democratic candidates have made substantial gains in the state's legislature, congressional delegation, and statewide executive offices. Going into the 2022 midterm elections, Arizona was considered a crucial swing state.

Primary elections in Arizona took place on August 2. The November general election had mixed results for both parties. The Republican Party picked up two of the five Democratic-held seats in the U.S. House of Representatives, the office of Superintendent of Public Instruction, and an additional seat on the Arizona Corporation Commission. In contrast, the Democrats held on to the state's Class 3 U.S. Senate seat and the secretary of state's office, while they flipped the governorship and the Attorney General's office.

Lawsuits contesting the election results were filed by the Republican candidates for governor, secretary of state, and attorney general, but the Arizona Superior Court ruled against the Republican candidates.

== United States Senate ==
Incumbent Democratic U.S. Senator Mark Kelly was first elected in the 2020 special election with 51.2% of the vote. Kelly ran for a full-term in office and won the Democratic primary unopposed.

Blake Masters, former president of the Thiel Foundation and former chief operating officer of Thiel Capital, was the Republican nominee after defeating Arizona Attorney General Mark Brnovich, businessman Jim Lamon, retired Air Force Major General Mick McGuire, and Arizona Corporation Commission member Justin Olson.

The Libertarian Party nominated Marc Victor, an attorney and the party's nominee for U.S. Senate in 2012. Victor withdrew from the race and endorsed Masters on November 1, 2022.

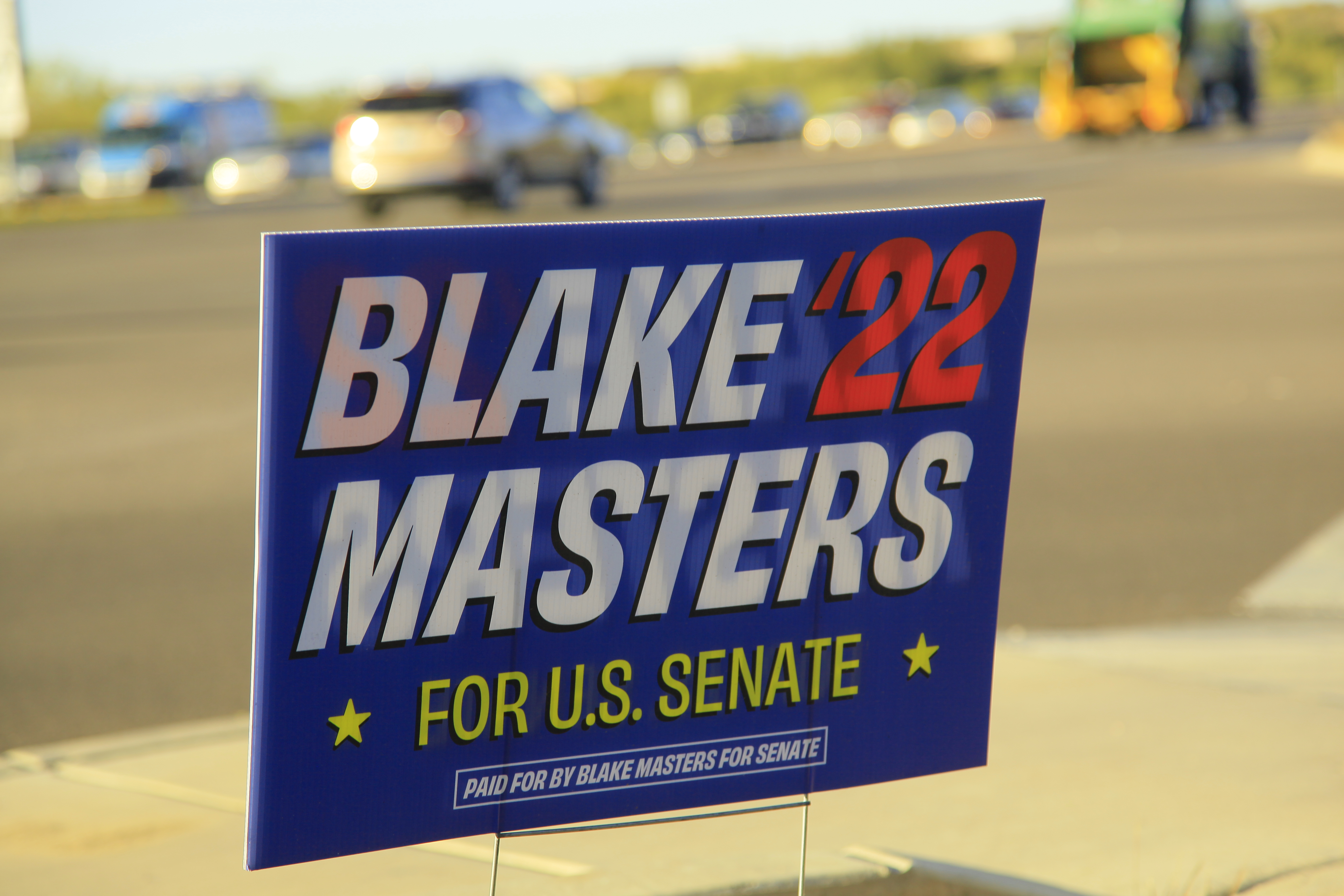
A "Blake Masters for Senate" yard sign in Oro Valley

=== Results ===
Incumbent senator Mark Kelly won reelection with 51.4% of the vote. Blake Masters conceded his election loss.

United States Senate election in Arizona, 2022
Party	Candidate	Votes	%
Democratic	Mark Kelly (incumbent)	1,322,027	51.39
Republican	Blake Masters	1,196,308	46.51
Libertarian	Marc Victor (withdrawn)	53,762	2.09
Total votes		2,572,096	100.00
Democratic hold			

== United States House of Representatives ==
Arizona has nine seats to the United States House of Representatives, which were held by five Democrats and four Republicans.

Six seats were won by Republican candidates while Democratic candidates won three seats.

== Governor ==
Incumbent Republican governor Doug Ducey was term-limited by the Arizona Constitution in 2022 and unable to seek re-election. He was re-elected in 2018 with 56.0% of the vote.

News anchor Kari Lake defeated Arizona Board of Regents member Karrin Taylor Robson in the Republican primary. In the Democratic primary, Secretary of State Katie Hobbs defeated former CBP official Marco A. López Jr.

Hobbs narrowly defeated Lake with 50.3% of the vote.

=== Results ===
Arizona gubernatorial election, 2022
Party	Candidate	Votes	%
Democratic	Katie Hobbs	1,287,891	50.32
Republican	Kari Lake	1,270,774	49.65
Total votes		2,558,664	100.00
Democratic gain from Republican			

== Secretary of State ==
Incumbent Democratic secretary of state Katie Hobbs retired to run for governor. She was first elected in 2018 with 50.4% of the vote.

In the Democratic primary, former Maricopa County recorder Adrian Fontes defeated state representative Reginald Bolding. Republican state senator Mark Finchem defeated fellow state legislators Shawnna Bolick, Michelle Ugenti-Rita, and advertising executive Beau Lane for the nomination.

=== Results ===
Fontes defeated Finchem in the general election with 52.4% of the votes.

Arizona Secretary of State election, 2022
Party	Candidate	Votes	%
Democratic	Adrian Fontes	1,320,619	52.38
Republican	Mark Finchem	1,200,411	47.62
Total votes		2,521,029	100.00
Democratic hold			

== Attorney general ==
Incumbent Republican attorney general Mark Brnovich was term-limited by the Arizona Constitution and unable to seek re-election. He was re-elected in 2018 with 51.7% of the vote.

The Republican nominee was Abraham Hamadeh.

Former commissioner Kris Mayes ran in the Democratic primary unopposed.

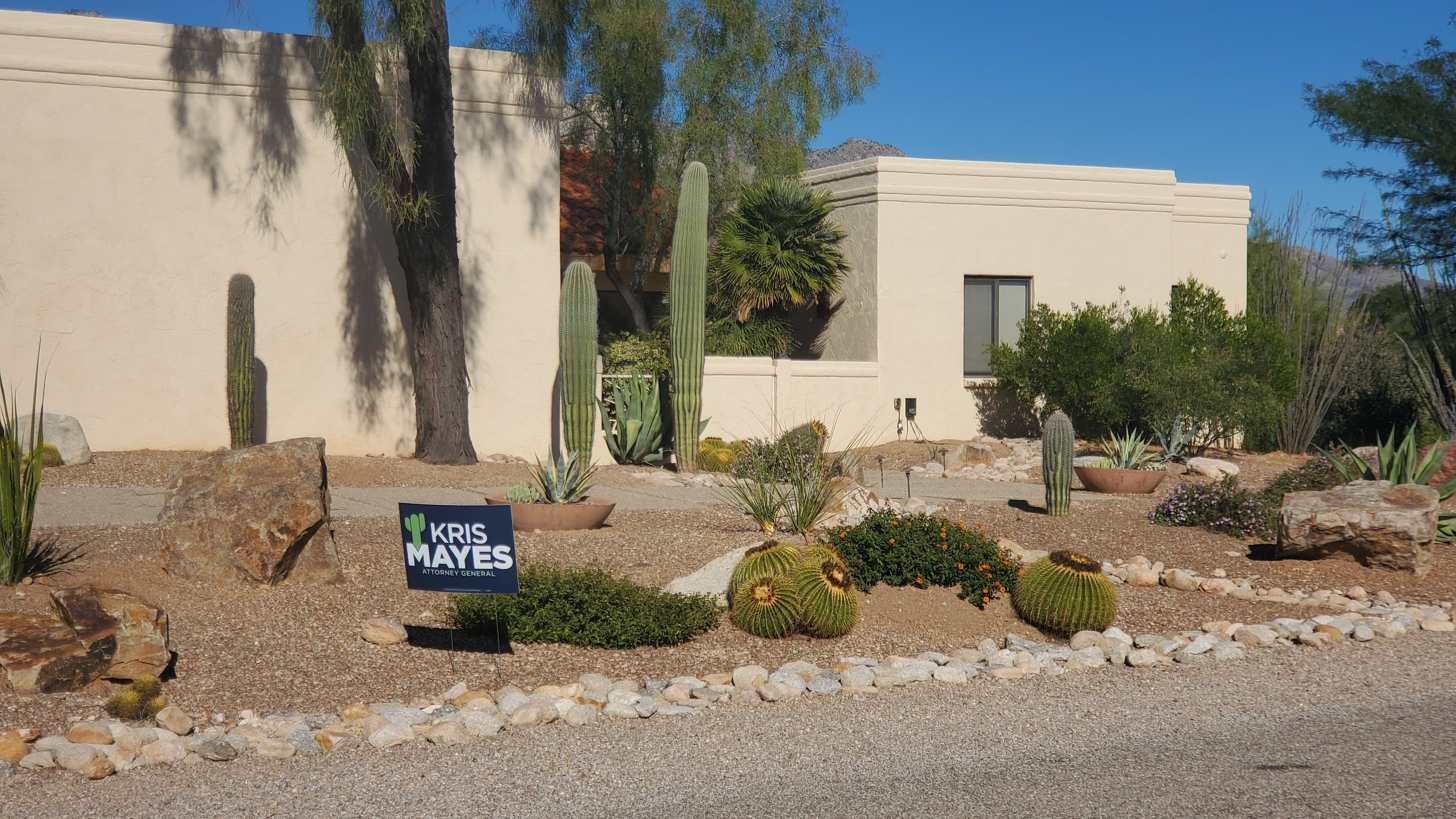
A "Kris Mayes for Arizona Attorney General" yard sign in Tucson

=== Results ===
The original round of vote counting ended on November 21, with Mayes having 511 more votes than Hamadeh in unofficial results, within the 0.5% margin for an automatic recount. The results of the recount were announced on December 29, with Mayes having 280 more votes than Hamadeh.

Arizona Attorney General election, 2022, recount
Party	Candidate	Votes	%
Democratic	Kris Mayes	1,254,809	50.01
Republican	Abraham Hamadeh	1,254,529	49.99
Total votes		2,509,338	100.00
Democratic gain from Republican			

== State treasurer ==
Incumbent Republican state treasurer Kimberly Yee originally announced her intentions to retire to run for governor. However, she later withdrew from that race to instead run for reelection. She was first elected in 2018 with 54.3% of the vote.

Corporate finance officer Bob Lettieri and state representative Jeff Weninger unsuccessfully challenged Yee in the Republican primary.

Democratic state senator Martín Quezada was the Democratic nominee.

Yee was successful, winning approximately 56% of the vote.

Arizona State Treasurer election, 2022
Party	Candidate	Votes	%
Republican	Kimberly Yee	1,390,135	55.67
Democratic	Martín Quezada	1,107,036	44.33
Total votes		2,497,171	100.00
Republican hold			

== Superintendent of Public Instruction ==
Incumbent Democratic Superintendent of Public Instruction Kathy Hoffman ran for re-election. She was first elected in 2018 with 51.6% of the vote.

Republicans nominated Tom Horne, former superintendent and former Arizona Attorney General, who defeated real estate manager Shiry Sapir, and state representative Michelle Udall.

Hoffman conceded defeat on November 17.

The original count of the election results had Horne winning by 8,967 votes; the recount results had Horne winning by 9,188 votes.

=== Results ===
Arizona Superintendent of Public Instruction, 2022, recount
Party	Candidate	Votes	%
Republican	Tom Horne	1,256,406	50.18
Democratic	Kathy Hoffman (incumbent)	1,247,218	49.82
Total votes		2,503,624	100.00
Republican gain from Democratic			

== State Mine Inspector ==
Results by county Marsh: Marsh — 90–100%

Former Republican Mine Inspector Joe Hart was term-limited by the Arizona Constitution and unable to seek re-election. He was re-elected in 2018 with 51.7% of the vote. Hart resigned on October 31, 2021, and was replaced by Paul Marsh, who was immediately eligible to run for a full term. Marsh then ran un-opposed and was elected to a four-year term outright.

Trista di Genova was the Democratic write-in candidate.

=== Republican primary ===
==== Results ====
Republican primary results
Party	Candidate	Votes	%
Republican	Paul Marsh (incumbent)	667,985	100.0%
Total votes		667,985	100.0%

=== General election ===
==== Results ====
Arizona Mine Inspector election, 2022
Party	Candidate	Votes	%
Republican	Paul Marsh (incumbent)	1,689,582	98.70%
Democratic	Trista di Genova (write-in)	22,202	1.30%
Total votes		1,711,784	100.0%
Republican hold			

== Corporation Commission ==
2022 Arizona Corporation Commission election
- November 8, 2022
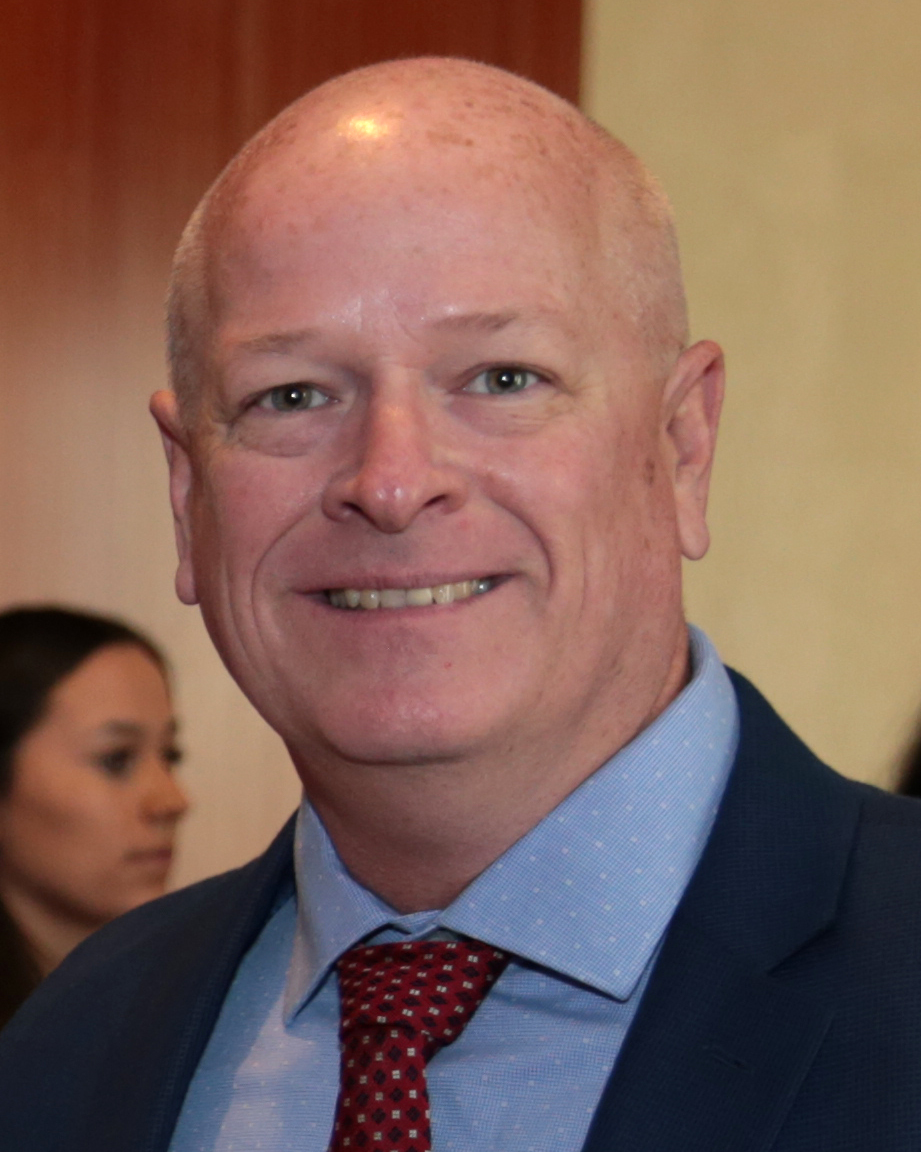

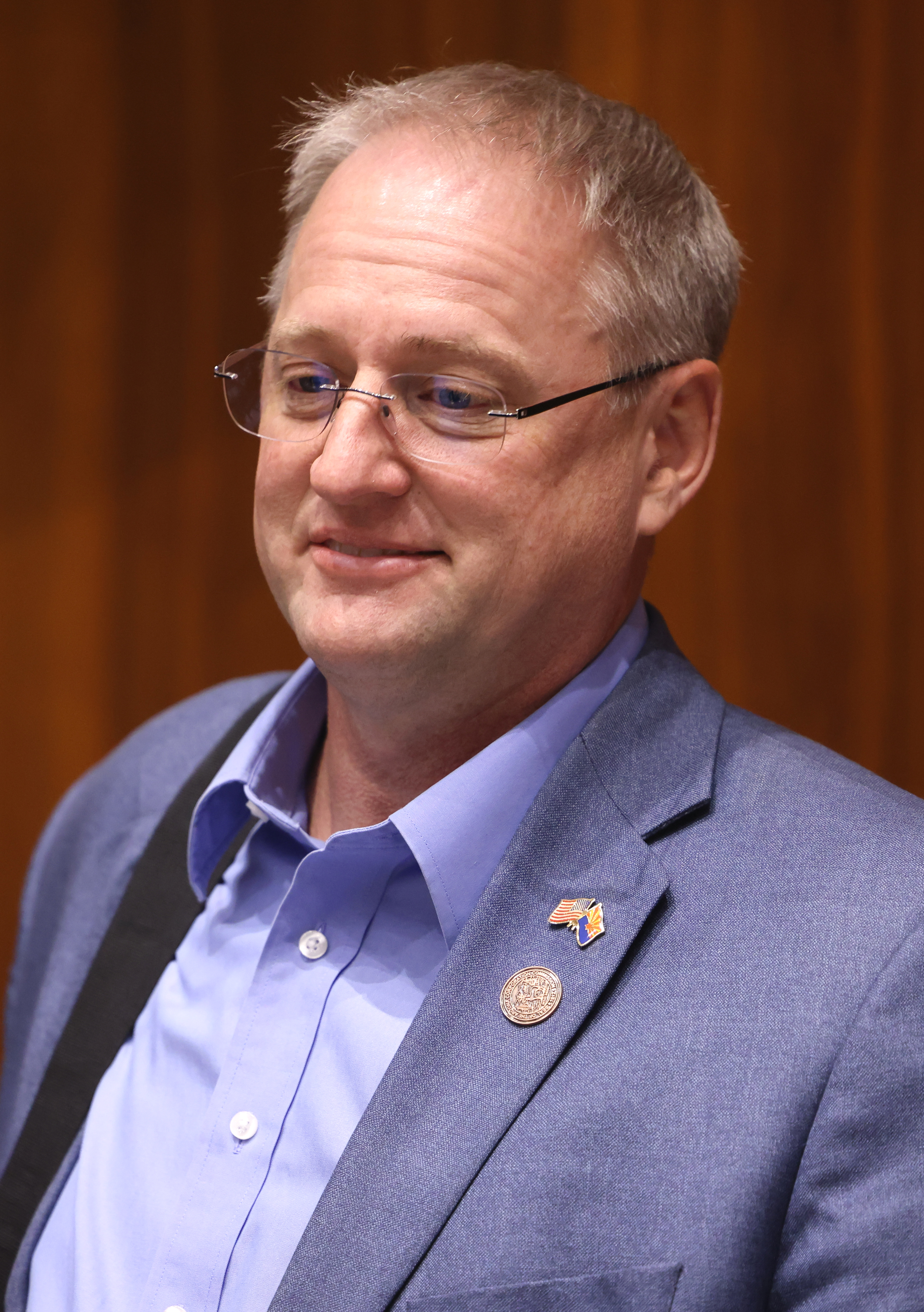

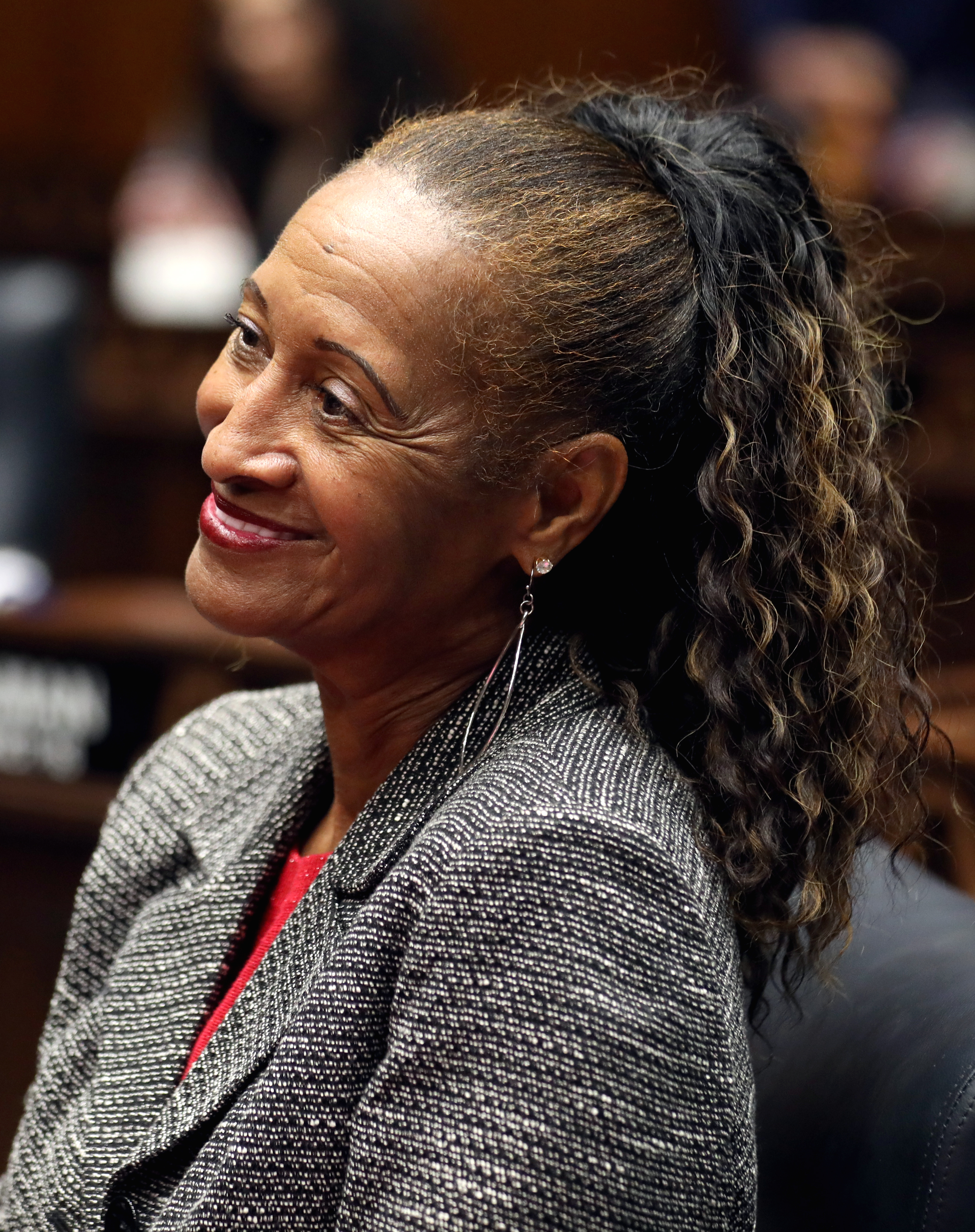

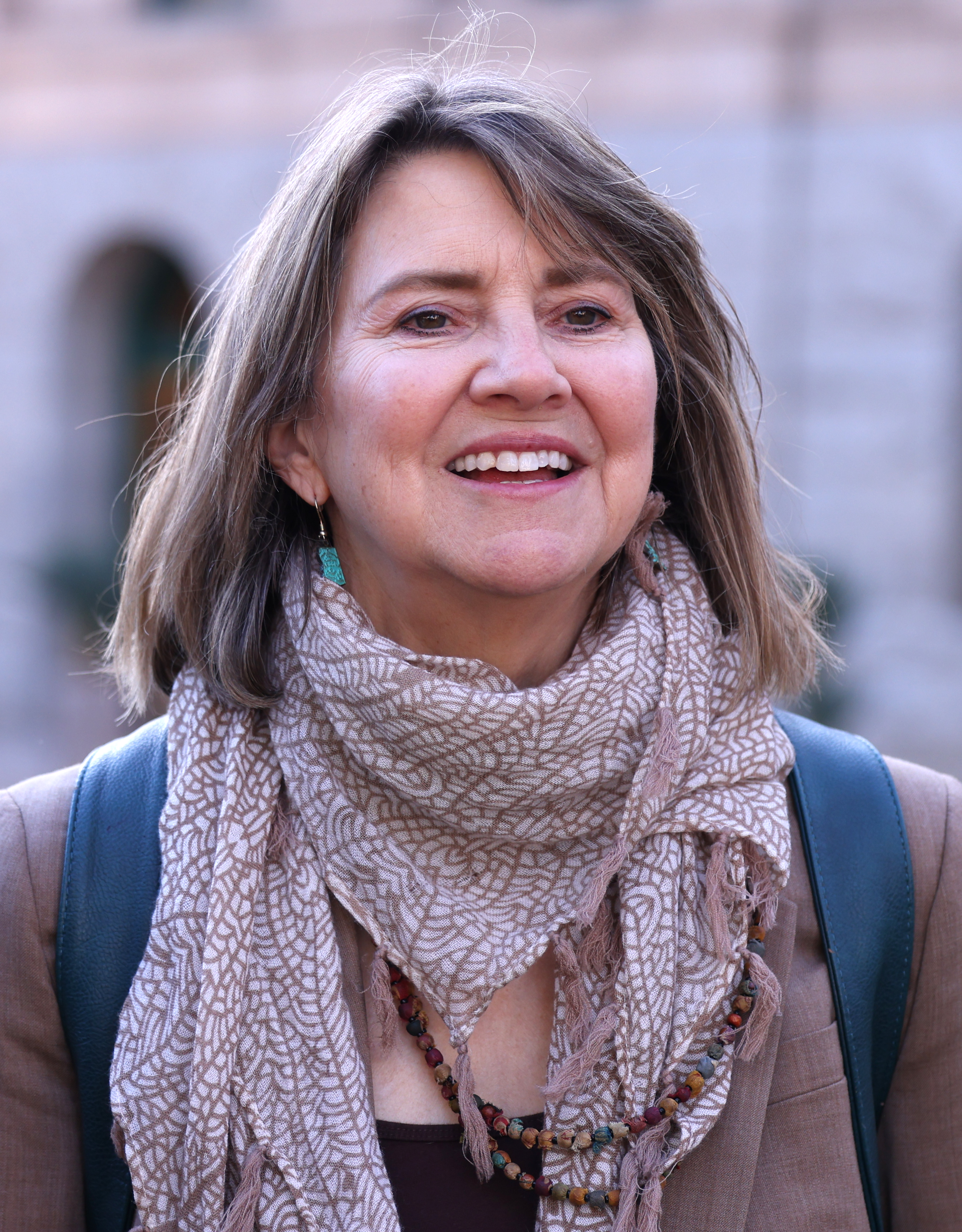
Nominee	Kevin Thompson	Nick Myers
Party	Republican	Republican
Popular vote	1,190,555	1,189,991
Percentage	26.02%	26.01%
Nominee	Sandra Kennedy	Lauren Kuby
Party	Democratic	Democratic
Popular vote	1,133,292	1,061,021
Percentage	24.77%	23.19%
Commissioners before election
Justin Olson (Republican)
Sandra Kennedy (Democratic)
Elected Commissioners
Kevin Thompson (Republican)
Nick Myers (Republican)

Two of the five seats on the Corporation Commission were up for election, elected by plurality block voting. Incumbents Sandra Kennedy, a Democrat, and Justin Olson, a Republican, were eligible for re-election. However, Olson announced he was running for U.S. senator.

Republicans Kevin Thompson and Nick Myers won the general election.

=== Republican primary ===
==== Candidates ====
===== Declared =====
- Nick Myers, policy advisor to commissioner Justin Olson
- Kim Owens, Arizona Power Authority commissioner and candidate for the corporation commission in 2020
- Kevin Thompson, Mesa city councilor

===== Declined =====
- Justin Olson, incumbent commissioner (running for U.S. Senate)

==== Polling ====
Poll source	Date(s) administered	Sample size (Note: Key: A – all adults RV – registered voters LV – likely voters V – unclear)	Margin of error	Nick Myers	Kim Owens	Kevin Thompson	Other	Undecided
Rasmussen Reports	July 27–28, 2022	710 (LV)	± 4.0%	17%	14%	15%	11%	44%

==== Endorsements ====
Kim Owens
- Maggie's List

==== Results ====
Republican primary results
Party	Candidate	Votes	%
Republican	Kevin Thompson	419,807	38.18
Republican	Nick Myers	364,084	33.11
Republican	Kim Owens	315,666	28.71
Total votes		1,099,557	100.00

=== Democratic primary ===
==== Declared ====
- Sandra Kennedy, incumbent commissioner
- Lauren Kuby, Tempe city councilor

==== Endorsements ====
Lauren Kuby
- Sandra Kennedy, incumbent corporation commissioner

==== Results ====
Democratic primary results
Party	Candidate	Votes	%
Democratic	Sandra Kennedy	488,559	54.12
Democratic	Lauren Kuby	414,237	45.88
Total votes		902,796	100.00

=== General election ===
==== Results ====
General election results
Party	Candidate	Votes	%
Republican	Kevin Thompson	1,190,555	26.02
Republican	Nick Myers	1,189,991	26.01
Democratic	Sandra Kennedy (incumbent)	1,133,292	24.77
Democratic	Lauren Kuby	1,061,021	23.19
Total votes		4,574,859	100.00
Republican hold			
Republican gain from Democratic			

== State legislature ==
All 90 seats in both chambers of the Arizona State Legislature were up for election in 2022. Republicans held small majorities in both chambers.

=== State senate ===
Party	Before	After	Change
Republican	16	16	Steady
Democratic	14	14	Steady
Total	30	30	Steady

=== House of Representatives ===
Party	Before	After	Change
Republican	31	31	Steady
Democratic	29	29	Steady
Total	60	60	Steady

== Supreme Court ==
Three Arizona Supreme Court justices were up for retention in 2022.

=== Justice Beene retention ===
Results by county Yes: 80–90%; 70–80%; 60–70%

James Beene was appointed by Governor Doug Ducey in 2019 to succeed retiring justice John Pelander.

Justice Beene retention, 2022
Choice	Votes	%
For	1,305,293	70.53
Against	545,434	29.47
Total	1,850,727	100.00
Source: Arizona Secretary of State

=== Justice Montgomery retention ===
Results by county Yes: 70–80%; 60–70%; 50–60%; No: 50–60%

Bill Montgomery was appointed by Governor Doug Ducey in 2019 to succeed retiring justice Scott Bales. Unlike the other two justices on the ballot, he received significant opposition from the voters due to his controversial conduct.

Justice Montgomery retention, 2022
Choice	Votes	%
For	1,042,134	55.53
Against	834,653	44.47
Total	1,876,787	100.00
Source: Arizona Secretary of State

=== Justice Timmer retention ===
Results by county Yes: 80–90%; 70–80%; 60–70%

Ann Timmer was appointed by Governor Jan Brewer in 2012 after outgoing justice Andrew D. Hurwitz became a federal judge on the Ninth Circuit. She was retained by the voters in 2016.

Justice Timmer retention, 2022
Choice	Votes	%
For	1,301,858	71.09
Against	529,551	28.91
Total	1,831,409	100.00
Source: Arizona Secretary of State

== Local elections ==
Numerous local elections also took take place in 2022. Some notable ones include:

- A special election to elect the County Attorney for Maricopa County due to the resignation of Allister Adel
- A special election for District 2 on the Maricopa County Board of Supervisors to replace Steve Chucri
- The first competitive mayoral race in Chandler in 16 years.
- Former Sheriff Joe Arpaio challenged Fountain Hills mayor Ginny Dickey.
- Four Phoenix City Council seats were up for election, including incumbent Jim Waring.
- Three candidates ran for mayor of Flagstaff.

== Ballot propositions ==
Arizona had ten statewide propositions on the ballot in 2022.

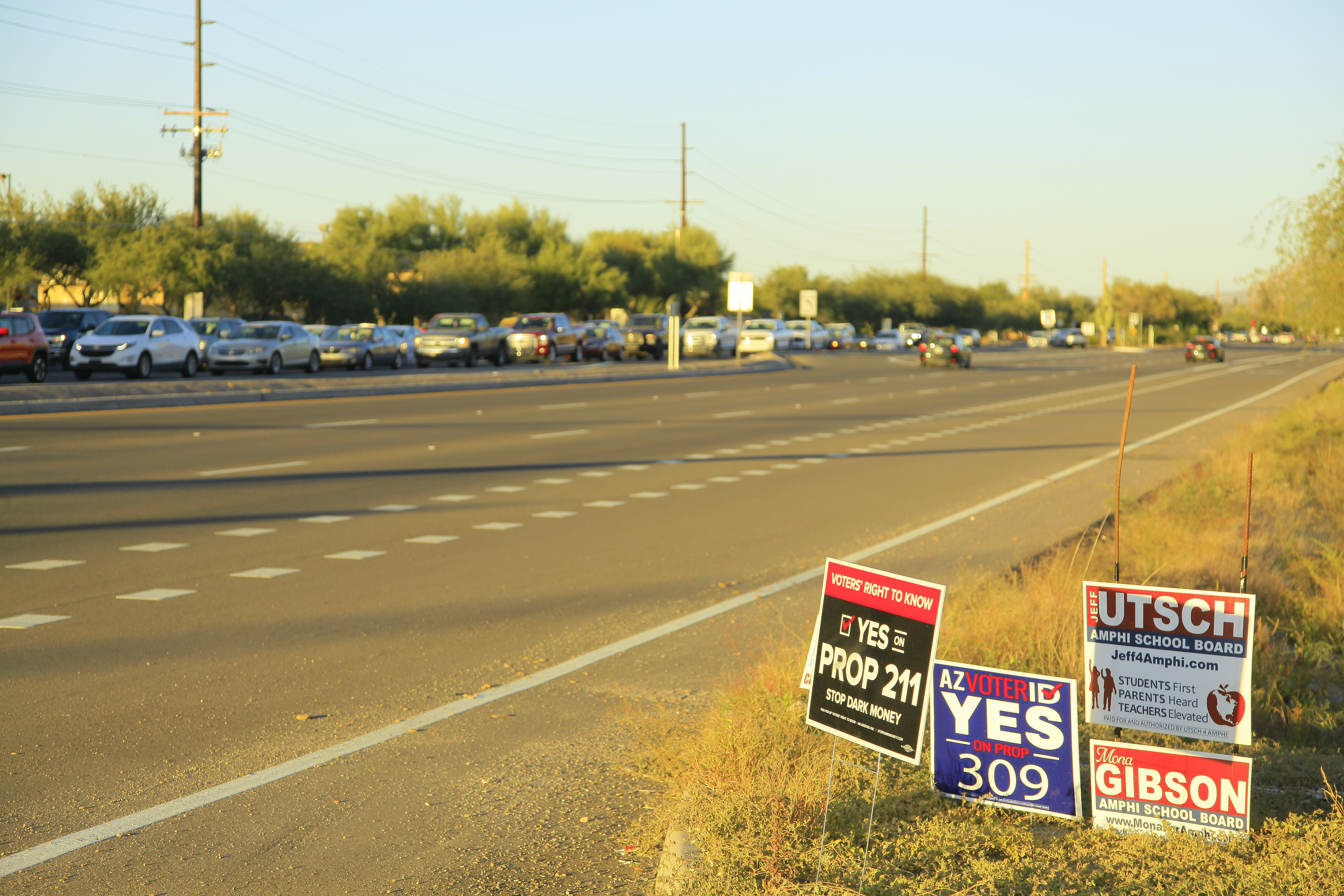
School board and proposition yard signs in Oro Valley

2022 Arizona ballot propositions
No.	Description	Votes				Type
No.	Description	Yes	%	No	%	Type
128	Would allow the legislature to amend voter approved ballot initiatives.	859,675	36.40	1,502,368	63.60	Legislatively referred constitutional amendment
129	Limits the subjects of ballot initiatives.	1,311,046	55.23	1,062,533	44.77	Legislatively referred constitutional amendment
130	Would allow the Legislature to set certain property tax exemption amounts and qualifications.	1,478,583	63.76	840,299	36.24	Legislatively referred constitutional amendment
131	Creates the office of Lieutenant Governor.	1,299,484	55.16	1,056,433	44.84	Legislatively referred constitutional amendment
132	Would require 60% approval for tax initiatives.	1,210,702	50.72	1,176,327	49.28	Legislatively referred constitutional amendment
209	Would limit interest rates for medical debt.	1,747,363	72.01	679,089	27.99	Citizen-initiated state statute
211	Would require additional campaign finance disclosure.	1,736,496	72.34	664,111	27.66	Citizen-initiated state statute
308	Repeals Proposition 300 (2006) that banned in-state tuition for undocumented high school students.	1,250,320	51.24	1,189,877	48.76	Legislatively referred state statute
309	Would require identification when voting by mail.	1,201,181	49.62	1,219,669	50.38	Legislatively referred state statute
310	Imposes a sales tax to support fire districts.	1,144,495	48.20	1,230,042	51.80	Legislatively referred state statute
Source: Arizona Secretary of State

Results by county

Proposition 128 results by county
No:
- 70–80%
- 60–70%
- 50–60%

Proposition 129 results by county
Yes:
- 60–70%
- 50–60%
No:
- 50–60%

Proposition 130 results by county
Yes:
- 60–70%
- 50–60%

Proposition 131 results by county
Yes:
- 50–60%
No:
- 50–60%

Proposition 132 results by county
Yes:
- 60–70%
- 50–60%
No:
- 50–60%

Proposition 209 results by county
Yes:
- 70–80%
- 60–70%

Proposition 211 results by county
Yes:
- 70–80%
- 60–70%

Proposition 308 results by county
Yes:
- 60–70%
- 50–60%
No:
- 70–80%
- 60–70%
- 50–60%

Proposition 309 results by county
No:
- 60–70%
- 50–60%
Yes:
- 60–70%
- 50–60%

Proposition 310 results by county
No:
- 50–60%
Yes:
- 60–70%
- 50–60%

== Certification ==
14 of Arizona's 15 counties certified the voting results by the November 28, 2022 deadline; the exception was Cochise County. Despite no evidence of irregularities with vote counting, Cochise County's Republican officials delayed their certification vote to December 2, 2022, to accommodate a hearing on the certification of voting machines. Previously, on November 21, Arizona's State Elections Director, Kori Lorick, had sent Cochise County officials confirmation that the Cochise County's voting machines had been certified by the United States Election Assistance Commission in an accredited laboratory. However, the county's Republican officials insisted on hearing more from those who had without evidence alleged that the voting machines were not properly certified. Cochise County election officials certified the county's voting results on December 1, after a court order was issued by Pima County Superior Court Judge Casey McGinley, who cited that by law, since Cochise County were no longer tabulating votes and had no missing votes, a certification vote needed to take place within 20 days of the election, which was November 28.

== Lawsuits over results ==
=== Kari Lake's lawsuit ===
Unsuccessful Republican gubernatorial candidate Kari Lake initiated a lawsuit on December 9 seeking a court order to either overturn Katie Hobbs' victory and declare Lake as the winner of the election, or redo the election in Maricopa County. On December 19, Maricopa County Superior Court Judge Peter Thompson dismissed eight of ten counts of Lake's lawsuit, regarding invalid signatures on mail-in ballots, incorrect certification, inadequate remedy, as well as violations of freedom of speech, equal protection, due process, the secrecy clause, and constitutional rights. Judge Thompson allowed the remaining two counts to go to trial, these being allegations that election officials intentionally interfered with Maricopa County ballot printers and with the chain of custody of Maricopa County ballots; Judge Thompson ruled that Lake needed to prove the allegations and that the alleged actions "did in fact result in a changed outcome" of the election. After the trial occurred on December 21 and December 22, Judge Thompson dismissed Lake's remaining case on December 24, as the court did not find clear and convincing evidence that misconduct was committed. Judge Thompson wrote: "Every single witness before the Court disclaimed any personal knowledge of such [intentional] misconduct. The Court cannot accept speculation or conjecture in place of clear and convincing evidence".

Lake appealed on December 27 to the Arizona Court of Appeals against Judge Thompson's rulings. Lake also attempted to have the lawsuit transferred before the Arizona Supreme Court, but the Arizona Supreme Court rejected this without prejudice on January 4, 2023, as "no good cause appears to transfer the matter to this court"; by this date, Hobbs had already assumed the position of Arizona Governor. On February 16, a three-judge panel for the Arizona Court of Appeals affirmed Thompson's ruling; chief judge Kent Cattani wrote the opinion and two other judges, Maria Elena Cruz and Peter Swann, concurred. The appeals court found that the evidence presented in court showed, contrary to Lake's claims, that "voters were able to cast their ballots, that votes were counted correctly and that no other basis justifies setting aside the election results".

After Lake appealed to the Arizona Supreme Court, it issued a ruling on March 22, 2023, written by Chief Justice Robert Brutinel, finding that the Arizona Court of Appeals correctly dismissed six of Lake's seven legal claims, as these challenges of hers were "insufficient to warrant the requested relief under Arizona or federal law." For Lake's remaining legal claim, on signature verification, the Arizona Supreme Court ruled that the lower courts incorrectly interpreted her challenge as pertaining to signature verification policies themselves, instead of the application of such policies; thus this issue was sent back for Maricopa County Superior Court Judge Peter Thompson to reconsider.

After a second trial, Judge Thompson on May 22, 2023, dismissed Lake's remaining claim on improper signature verification, stating that Lake had not provided "clear and convincing evidence or a preponderance of evidence" of misconduct in the election; instead the court received "ample evidence that — objectively speaking — a comparison between voter records and signatures was conducted in every instance [that Lake] asked the Court to evaluate." While Lake's attorneys ultimately argued that signature verification was done too quickly, Thompson concluded that it was possible for signature verification to be done quickly and properly when "looking at signatures that, by and large, have consistent characteristics".

=== Sonny Borrelli's lawsuit ===
Republican Arizona state senator Sonny Borrelli filed a lawsuit on December 12 to invalidate the results of the gubernatorial election won by Katie Hobbs. On December 16, Mohave County Superior Court Judge Lee Jantzen dismissed Borrelli's lawsuit as Borrelli's lawyers waited too long to provide service to the defendants, thus there was not enough time to conclude the lawsuit by the legal deadline for election challenges.

=== Mark Finchem's lawsuit ===
Unsuccessful Republican secretary of state candidate Mark Finchem filed a lawsuit on December 9 to have the election "nullified and redone". The lawsuit was dismissed with prejudice on December 16 by Maricopa County Superior Court judge Melissa Julian. Among other issues, Judge Julian rejected the merits of Finchem's arguments on voting machines certification and voting software certification, and separately concluded that Finchem "does not allege that any of the votes cast were actually illegal" and does not allege that any legal vote was not counted, but only alleged "suspicions that some votes may not have been counted", which was insufficient to overturn an election. Judge Julian also rejected Finchem's allegations of "misconduct" by Secretary of State Katie Hobbs as insufficient.

Judge Julian in March 2023 sanctioned Finchem and his lawyer to pay the legal fees of Fontes' campaign and office because Finchem's lawsuit was "groundless and not brought in good faith." The judge noted that a supposed expert called by Finchem asserted that there were "missing votes", but the number of "missing votes" claimed was not enough to change the result of the election. The judge cited Finchem's decision not to inspect ballots as indicating that Finchem "had no expectation that an inspection would yield a favorable outcome", which further "demonstrates that Finchem challenged his election loss despite knowing that his claims regarding misconduct and procedural irregularities were insufficient under the law to sustain the contest." Finchem reacted to the sanctions by calling for Judge Julian to be "removed from the bench for her abuse of judicial authority". In May 2023, Judge Julian ruled that the amount of legal fees and costs that Finchem is to pay to Fontes is $40,565.

Finchem appealed the rejection of his election challenge, then abandoned the appeal in July 2023, with his lawyer citing other failed 2022 election challenging lawsuits in Arizona; however Finchem continued to appeal the sanctions against him in this case.

=== Abe Hamadeh's lawsuits ===
Republican candidate for attorney general, Abe Hamadeh, filed a lawsuit on November 22 in an attempt to be declared the winner, despite his opponent Kris Mayes having more votes at the time; Maricopa County Superior Court Judge Randall Warner dismissed the lawsuit without prejudice on November 29, ruling that it was premature because Arizona had yet to certify the election and declare election results.

While awaiting a recount for the election due to the close result, Hamadeh, who was behind in the original count, initiated a lawsuit on December 9 "to ensure that all lawfully cast votes are properly counted and that unlawfully cast votes are not counted". Mohave County Superior Court Judge Lee Jantzen noted that Hamadeh's lawsuit was different from others because Hamadeh "is not alleging political motives or fraud or personal agendas being pushed", but "is simply alleging misconduct by mistake, or omission by election officials, led to erroneous count of votes and which if true could have led to an uncertain result" of the election. Judge Jantzen on December 20 dismissed one count of the lawsuit alleging that Hamadeh's unverified early ballots were illegal votes. The rest of the lawsuit was regarding wrongful disqualification of provisional and early ballots, wrongful exclusion of provisional voters, inaccurate ballot duplications, and inaccurate ballot adjudications; Judge Jantzen denied the remainder of Hamadeh's election challenge on December 23 at the end of a three-hour evidentiary hearing, stating that there was an absence of "even slight information" that "the election was done illegally or incorrectly".

Hamadeh filed another lawsuit regarding the election result on January 4, 2023, after Mayes had already been sworn in as attorney general; the new lawsuit cited that the "recount results identified significant, material discrepancies" which were not known to the court during the previous lawsuit. Judge Jantzen rejected this lawsuit in July 2023, writing that election laws "preclude issuing a new trial with extended discovery", and finding that there was no new evidence that could not have been previously produced at the original trial.

== Independent investigation into printing problems ==
The results of an independent investigation into the 2022 election's printing problems was published in April 2023; the investigation was led by a retired chief justice of the Arizona Supreme Court, Ruth McGregor, who concluded that "the primary cause of the election day failures was equipment failure", and that no evidence gathered gave "clear indication that the problems should have been anticipated". McGregor also detailed: "Two-thirds of the general election vote centers reported no issues with misprinted ballots; approximately 94 percent of election day ballots were not faulty".
