= Lauren Kuby =

American politician and sustainability scientist

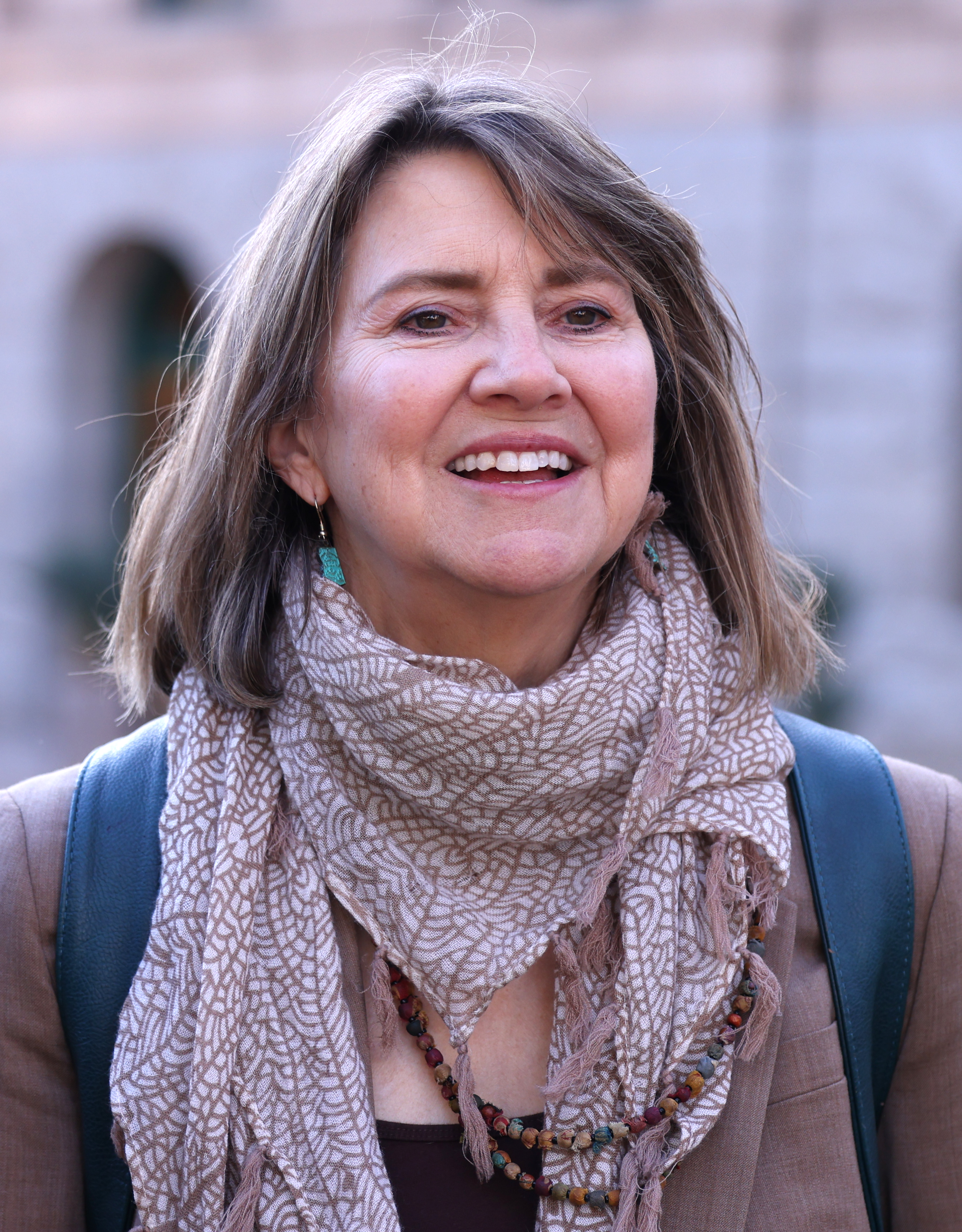
- Kuby in 2025

Member of the Arizona Senate from the 8th district
- Incumbent
- Assumed office January 13, 2025
- Preceded by: Juan Mendez

Personal details
- Party: Democratic
- Children: 2
- Education: University of Chicago; Arizona State University

Lauren Kuby is an American politician and sustainability scientist serving in the Arizona Senate for Arizona's 8th legislative district. She was previously a member and vice mayor of the Tempe City Council. At Arizona State University, she held roles focused on community outreach and sustainable development and has conducted research on the intersection of social and ecological issues.

== Education ==
Kuby is from Boston. She earned a B.A. in early American history from the University of Chicago in 1980, graduating with honors. In 1992, she completed a M.A. in public history at Arizona State University (ASU), where she also received a certificate in scholarly editing. During her graduate studies, she was recognized by ASU's department of history with the best master's thesis award for her work titled What’s Sown Deep Takes Root: Schoolbook Advice to Girls and the Ideal of Womanhood, 1800 to 1830.

== Career ==
=== Academia ===
At ASU, Kuby worked for over 25 years in roles focused on sustainability and community outreach. She worked as a manager of outreach for ASU's Global Institute of Sustainability and Innovation and managed the Stardust Center for Affordable Homes and the Family. In these roles, she collaborated with ASU faculty, community organizations, and local businesses to address issues around affordable housing, sustainable urban development, and the social determinants of health. Later in her career, she was appointed as a senior global futures scientist at ASU, a position within the university's Global Institute of Sustainability and Innovation, where she continues her work on environmental and community-focused initiatives.

Kuby's research includes co-authored publications in 2007 on conservation and ecology. She worked on a study titled "Estimating the Effect of Protected Lands on the Development and Conservation of Their Surroundings" published in Conservation Biology, which examined the impact of protected areas on surrounding land development. In another 2007 publication in Ecosystems, titled "Integrating Social Science into the Long-Term Ecological Research Network," she explored how social and ecological factors interact in the context of long-term ecological changes.

In 2020 and again in 2022, the Sierra Club’s Grand Canyon Chapter honored her as a "Climate Hero" for her contributions to environmental initiatives in Arizona. Kuby also received the "Women of Inspiration" award from ASU's University Career Women in 2018.

=== Politics ===
In 2014, Kuby was elected to the Tempe, Arizona City Council, running on a sustainability-focused platform. During her tenure, she led initiatives supporting social, economic, and environmental justice, including advocating for Equal pay for equal work, earned sick days, affordable housing, climate action planning, and urban forestry. In 2016, her work on the council was recognized when she was named "Top Municipal Elected Official in the US" by Democratic Municipal Officials. In 2018, she was re-elected to the council and served as vice mayor of Tempe. That same year, she led a campaign to amend the city's charter to require disclosure of dark money in political campaigns, which passed with 91.44 percent voter approval.

Kuby announced her candidacy for the Arizona Corporation Commission in August 2021, running as a clean elections candidate for the 2022 election cycle. Her campaign centered on making energy affordable and advocating for a transition to renewable sources across the state. In a separate race, she ran for the Salt River Project (SRP) board, which governs water and electricity resources in the Phoenix metropolitan area, emphasizing transparency in resource management and addressing the unique challenges posed by Arizona's water scarcity. Democratic candidates Sandra Kennedy and Kuby lost in the general election.

In May 2024, the Arizona Democratic Party nominated Kuby as their candidate in the 2024 Arizona Senate election for the 8th legislative district. This nomination came after state representative Melody Hernandez withdrew due to a Republican legal challenge, which claimed Hernandez lacked enough valid signatures and was ineligible due to unpaid fines related to campaign finance reports. Kuby, along with Ivan Pemberton, initially filed as a write-in candidate, but Democratic precinct committee members ultimately invoked a statutory provision allowing them to appoint her directly to the ballot rather than relying on the write-in campaign. In September 2024 debate, Kuby faced off against Republican Roxana Holzapfel. Kuby advocated for environmental action, housing as a human right, and access to abortion, while Holzapfel emphasized fiscal restraint, border security, and support for school choice. The debate highlighted sharp contrasts in their views on tax policy, public education funding, and Proposition 139 on abortion access. In November 2024, Kuby is projected to have won in the general election.

== Personal life ==
Kuby is secular and a vegan. She has resided in Tempe, Arizona, for over 34 years with her husband, Mike, who is a professor at ASU's School of Geographical Sciences and Urban Planning. They have two daughters.

== Electoral history ==
2022 Arizona Corporation Commission, general election results
Party	Candidate	Votes	%
Republican	Kevin Thompson	1,190,555	26.02
Republican	Nick Myers	1,189,991	26.01
Democratic	Sandra Kennedy (incumbent)	1,133,292	24.77
Democratic	Lauren Kuby	1,061,021	23.19
Total votes		4,574,859	100.00
Republican hold			
Republican gain from Democratic			
