= Kiana Sears =

American politician and sustainability scientist

Kiana Maria Sears
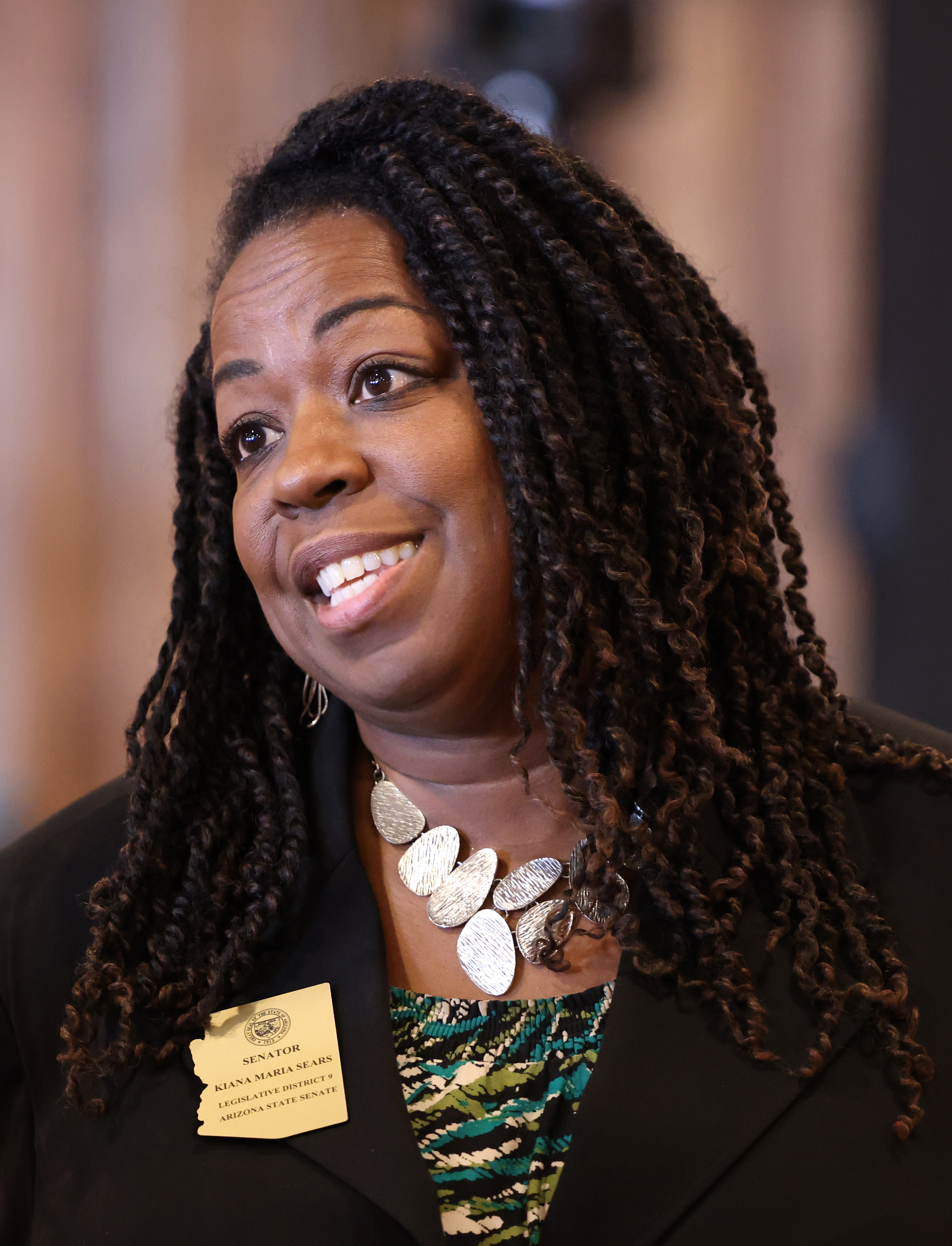
- Sears in 2025

Member of the Arizona Senate from the 9th district
- Incumbent
- Assumed office March 31, 2025
- Preceded by: Eva Burch

Personal details
- Born: 1974 or 1975 (age 51–52) New Orleans, Louisiana, U.S.
- Party: Democratic
- Spouse: Ernest
- Children: 2, including Elaissia
- Education: Arizona State University (BA, MPA)

Kiana Maria Sears (born 1974/1975) is an American politician serving in the Arizona Senate for 9th district. She was appointed to the role by the Maricopa County Board of Supervisors in 2025 to succeed Eva Burch, who resigned.

== Early life and education ==
A native of New Orleans, Louisiana, Sears grew up in New Orleans East and moved to Arizona in 1995 with her husband. Sears earned a B.A. in intercultural communications with a minor in business administration (marketing and management) from Arizona State University (ASU). She later received a M.P.A. in human resources and management from ASU's School of Public Affairs, College of Public Programs. Sears completed a certificate in regulatory studies through the Institute of Public Utilities (IPU) and the National Association of Regulatory Utility Commissioners (NARU) Rate School at Michigan State University.

== Career ==
Sears began her career in public policy as a Child Public Policy Intern with the Children's Action Alliance from 1998 to 1999, where she worked on legislation concerning foster care. During the 2001 legislative session, she served as a research staff member in the Arizona Senate, preparing bill summaries, drafting amendments, and briefing legislators.

From 2008 to 2014, Sears worked as an executive consultant at the Arizona Corporation Commission (ACC). Her responsibilities included preparing staff reports, testifying at hearings, and coordinating across departments on regulatory matters related to public utilities. Sears served on the Mesa Public Schools board for nine years 2016 to 2025.

In 2018, she unsuccessfully ran for the ACC, placing fourth in the general election with 24% of the vote. The Arizona Secretary of State's office found that Sears violated financial disclosure laws by failing to report all of her and her husband's businesses, many of which were inactive LLCs. The Arizona Attorney General office was referred to the complaint but declared Sears did not violate the law, finding that she made a mistake and accepted amended filings.

Starting in October 2018, Sears served as assistant director of Faith Based Outreach and Community Partnerships at ASU, where she worked on initiatives to support underrepresented student populations and create college-readiness programs in collaboration with community organizations.

In 2024, she ran for justice of the peace in Maricopa County's North Mesa Precinct, losing to Republican incumbent Kyle Jones with 42.2% of the vote.

=== Arizona Senate ===
Following incumbent Eva Burch's resignation on March 14, 2025, the Maricopa County Board of Supervisors interviewed candidates to fill the vacancy, ultimately choosing Sears over former candidate for Maricopa County Schools Superintendent Laura Metcalfe and former Mesa city councilmember Ryan Winkle. She will fill the remainder of Burch's term through 2026.

== Electoral history ==
=== 2018 ===
2018 Arizona Corporation Commission Democratic primary election
Party	Candidate	Votes	%
Democratic	Sandra Kennedy	351,561	45.1
Democratic	Kiana Sears	219,011	28.1
Democratic	William "Bill" Mundell	208,941	26.8
Total votes		779,513	100.0

Arizona Corporation Commission election, 2018
Party	Candidate	Votes	%
Democratic	Sandra Kennedy	1,076,800	25.7
Republican	Justin Olson (incumbent)	1,053,862	25.2
Republican	Rodney Glassman	1,049,394	25.1
Democratic	Kiana Sears	1,006,654	24.0
Write-in		232	0.0
Total votes		4,186,942	100.0
Democratic gain from Republican			
Republican hold			

== Personal life ==
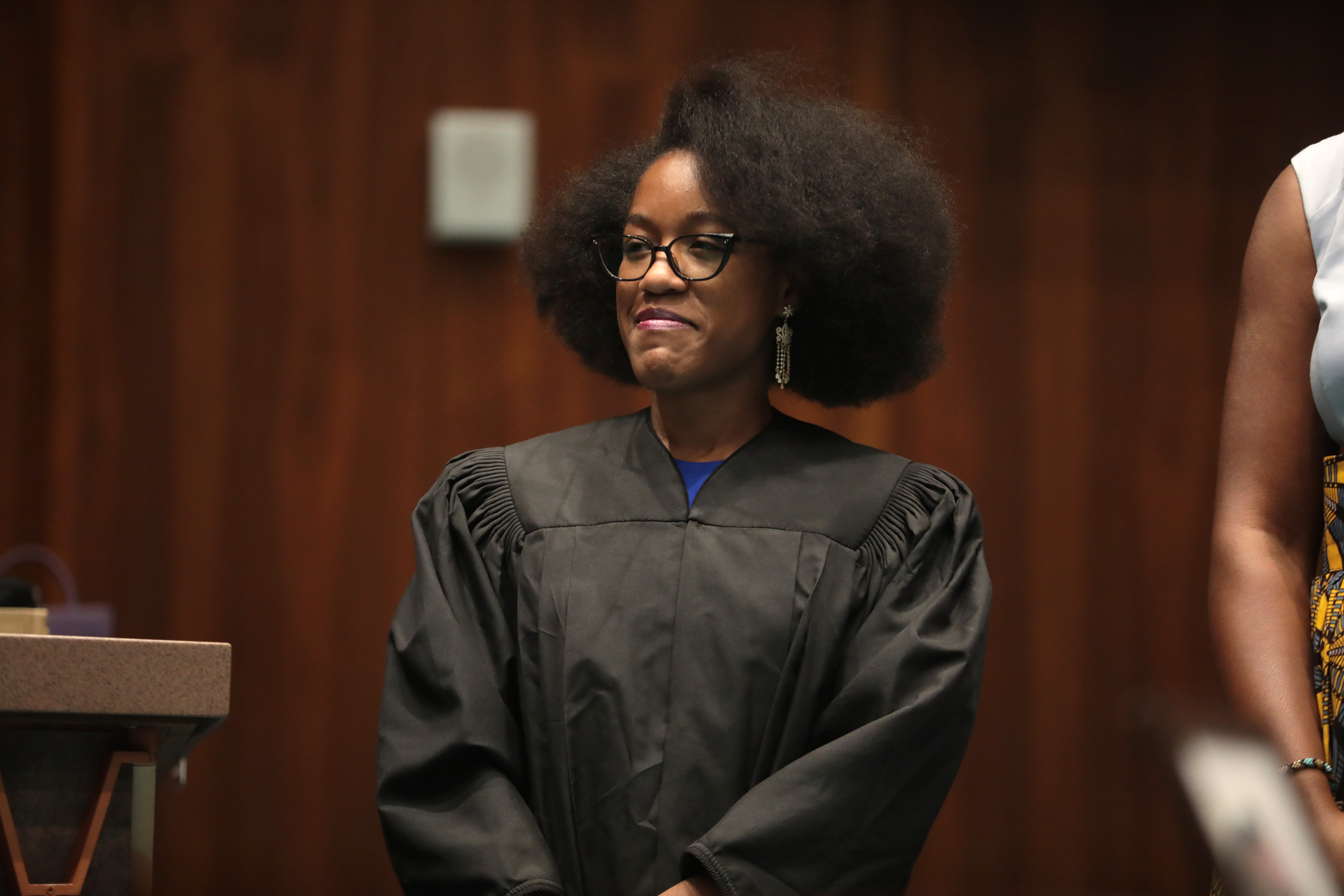
Sears' daughter, Elaissia, in 2023.

Sears has lived in Mesa, Arizona, for two decades. She is married to Ernest Sears. Their daughter, Elaissia, serves as a justice of the peace and was the youngest person to ever be elected to the position at the age of 24 in 2018.
