= APGA =

APGA may refer to:

- All Progressives Grand Alliance, a political party in Nigeria
- American Personnel and Guidance Association, a professional organization of counselors in the United States
- American Public Gardens Association, an association of public-garden institutions and professionals primarily in the United States and Canada
- American Public Gas Association, a nonprofit trade organization in the United States
