= PGPC =

PGPC may refer to:

- Pakistan GasPort Consortium Limited, owner and operator of an LNG terminal
- Philippine Geothermal Production Company, a geothermal development company and subsidiary of SM Investments
- Public Gas Policy Council, a council of the American Public Gas Association
- PgpC, a Type II phosphatidate phosphatase
