= Jacob Martinez =

American politician

Member-elect of the Arizona House of Representatives from the 9th district
- Assuming office January 2027
- Succeeding: Seth Blattman

Personal details
- Party: Democratic

Jacob Martinez is an American politician. A member of the Democratic Party, he is the member-elect for the 9th district of the Arizona House of Representatives.
