= Arizona's 9th legislative district =

American legislative district

- Map of District 9: Approved January 21, 2022
- Senator: Kiana Sears (D)
- House members: Lorena Austin (D); Seth Blattman (D)
- Registration: 32.34% Republican; 29.25% Democratic; 36.34% Other
- Demographics: 47% White; 6% Black/African American; 4% Native American; 4% Asian; 38% Hispanic
- Population: 238,117
- Voting-age population: 179,431
- Registered voters: 113,260

Arizona's 9th legislative district is one of 30 in the state, consisting of a section of Maricopa County. As of 2023, there are 39 precincts in the district, all in Maricopa, with a total registered voter population of 113,260. The district has an overall population of 238,117.

Following the 2020 United States redistricting cycle, the Arizona Independent Redistricting Commission (AIRC) redrew legislative district boundaries in Arizona. According to the AIRC, the district is highly competitive politically.

== Political representation ==
The district is represented in the 57th Arizona State Legislature, which convenes from January 1, 2025, to December 31, 2026, by Kiana Sears (D-Mesa) in the Arizona Senate and by Lorena Austin (D-Mesa) and Seth Blattman (D-Mesa) in the Arizona House of Representatives. Sears was appointed to replace Eva Burch, who resigned in March 2025.

| Name | Image | Residence | Office | Party |
|---|---|---|---|---|
| Kiana Sears | | Mesa | State senator | Democrat |
| Lorena Austin | | Mesa | State representative | Democrat |
| Seth Blattman | | Mesa | State representative | Democrat |

== Election results ==
The 2022 Arizona elections were the first in the newly drawn district.

=== Arizona Senate ===
2022 Arizona's 9th Senate district election
| Party | Candidate | Votes | % |
|---|---|---|---|
| Democratic | Eva Burch | 32,808 | 52.47 |
| Republican | Robert Scantlebury | 29,715 | 47.53 |
| Total votes | | 62,523 | 100 |
| Democratic gain from Republican | | | |

=== Arizona House of Representatives ===
2022 Arizona House of Representatives election, 9th district
| Party | Candidate | Votes | % |
|---|---|---|---|
| Democratic | Lorena Austin | 30,980 | 26.52 |
| Democratic | Seth Blattman | 29,403 | 25.17 |
| Republican | Kathy Pearce | 28,643 | 24.52 |
| Republican | Mary Ann Mendoza | 27,791 | 23.79 |
| Total votes | | 116,817 | 100.00 |
| Democratic hold | | | |
| Democratic hold | | | |

== See also ==
- List of Arizona legislative districts
- Arizona State Legislature
