= 2018 Arizona elections =

- November 6, 2018

A general election was held in the U.S. state of Arizona on November 6, 2018. All of Arizona's executive offices were up for election as well as a United States Senate seat and all of Arizona's nine seats in the United States House of Representatives. The Republican Party won the majority of statewide offices while the Democratic Party picked up three statewide offices.

== U.S. Senate ==
Incumbent Republican Jeff Flake was eligible to run for re-election to a second term. As a strong critic of President Donald Trump and remaining unpopular in the state, Flake announced in October 2017 that he would not seek reelection.

President Trump and Republicans backed Martha McSally to succeed Flake. Kelli Ward, former state senator and candidate for the U.S. Senate in 2016 also ran for the Republican nomination for the open seat.

=== Results ===
On the evening of Monday, November 12, 2018, McSally posted on her Twitter that she had spoken with Sinema and conceded. Sinema celebrated with supporters later that evening.

United States Senate election in Arizona, 2018
Party	Candidate	Votes	%
Democratic	Kyrsten Sinema	1,191,100	49.96%
Republican	Martha McSally	1,135,200	47.61%
Green	Angela Green	57,442	2.41%
Write-in		566	0.02%
Total votes		2,384,308	100%
Democratic gain from Republican			

== U.S. House of Representatives ==
=== February special election ===
A special election was held in Arizona's 8th congressional district following the resignation of Congressman Trent Franks. Republican nominee and former Arizona Senate president pro tem Debbie Lesko won a closer-than-expected race against Democratic challenger Hiral Tipirneni.

Arizona's 8th congressional district special election, 2018
Party	Candidate	Votes	%
Republican	Debbie Lesko	96,012	52.37%
Democratic	Hiral Tipirneni	87,331	47.63%
Total votes		183,343	100%
Republican hold			

=== November general election ===
Party	Candidates	Votes		Seats		
Party	Candidates	No.	%	No.	+/–	%
Democratic	9	1,179,193	50.37	5	▲1	55.56
Republican	9	1,139,251	48.67	4	▼1	44.44
Green	2	22,378	0.96	0	Steady	0.0
Write-in	3	147	0.01	0	Steady	0.0
Total	23	2,341,270	100.0	9	Steady	100.0

Popular vote
Democratic	50.37%
Republican	48.67%
Green	0.96%
Other	0.01%

House seats
Democratic	55.56%
Republican	44.44%

== Governor ==
Incumbent Republican governor Doug Ducey won re-election to a second term.

=== Results ===
Arizona gubernatorial election, 2018
Party	Candidate	Votes	%
Republican	Doug Ducey (incumbent)	1,330,863	56.00%
Democratic	David Garcia	994,341	41.84%
Green	Angel Torres	50,962	2.15%
Write-in		275	0.01%
Total votes		2,376,441	100%
Republican hold			

== Secretary of state ==
Incumbent Republican secretary of state Michele Reagan lost the nomination for a second term to Steve Gaynor, who lost the general election to Democratic state senator Katie Hobbs.

=== Results ===
Arizona Secretary of State election, 2018
Party	Candidate	Votes	%
Democratic	Katie Hobbs	1,176,384	50.43%
Republican	Steve Gaynor	1,156,132	49.56%
Write-in		169	0.01%
Total votes		2,332,685	100%
Democratic gain from Republican			

== Attorney general ==
Incumbent Republican attorney general Mark Brnovich won re-election to a second term.

=== Republican primary ===
==== Candidates ====
===== Declared =====
- Mark Brnovich, incumbent attorney general, former director of the Arizona Department of Gaming, and former Assistant U.S. Attorney for the U.S. District Court of Arizona

==== Primary results ====
Republican primary results
Party	Candidate	Votes	%
Republican	Mark Brnovich (incumbent)	561,370	100.0
Total votes		561,370	100.0

=== Democratic primary ===
==== Candidates ====
- January Contreras, former director of Arizona Department of Health Services and senior advisor to former U.S. Homeland Security Secretary Janet Napolitano

==== Primary results ====
Democratic primary results
Party	Candidate	Votes	%
Democratic	January Contreras	464,510	100.0
Total votes		464,510	100.0

=== Libertarian primary ===
==== Candidates ====
===== Declared =====
- Michael Kielsky (write-in candidate)

==== Primary results ====
Libertarian primary results
Party	Candidate	Votes	%
Libertarian	Michael Kielsky (write-in)	2,156	100.0
Total votes		2,144	100.0

=== Endorsements ===
Mark Brnovich (R)

Organizations

- Arizona Chamber of Commerce
- Arizona Fraternal Order of Police
- Arizona REALTORS
- Arizona Right to Life
- Arizona Police Association
- Cochise County Sheriff P.J. Allred
- Phoenix Chamber of Commerce
- Phoenix Law Enforcement Association
- Pinal County Sheriff Mark Lamb
- Professional Fire Fighters of Arizona
- Yavapai County Sheriff Scott Mascher
- Yuma County Sheriff Leon Wilmot
January Contreras (D)

Organizations

- Democracy for America
- Emily's List
- Human Rights Campaign
- Planned Parenthood Advocates of Arizona

=== General election ===
==== Polling ====
Poll source	Date(s) administered	Sample size	Margin of error	Mark Brnovich (R)	January Contreras (D)	Undecided
OH Predictive Insights	September 5–6, 2018	597	± 4.0%	48%	36%	16%
Data Orbital	October 1–3, 2018	550	± 4.2%	46%	33%	19%

==== Results ====
Arizona Attorney General election, 2018
Party	Candidate	Votes	%
Republican	Mark Brnovich (incumbent)	1,201,398	51.73%
Democratic	January Contreras	1,120,726	48.26%
Write-in		346	0.01%
Total votes		2,322,470	100%
Republican hold			

== State treasurer ==
Incumbent Republican state treasurer Jeff DeWit announced on April 6, 2016, that he would not run for re-election to a second term as state treasurer. Republican Kimberly Yee won the general election.

=== Results ===
Arizona State Treasurer election, 2018
Party	Candidate	Votes	%
Republican	Kimberly Yee	1,249,120	54.28%
Democratic	Mark Manoil	1,052,197	45.72%
Total votes		2,301,317	100%
Republican hold			

== Superintendent of Public Instruction ==
Incumbent Republican Superintendent of Public Instruction Diane Douglas ran for re-election to a second term and lost to Frank Riggs in a close five-way primary. Riggs lost to Democratic teacher Kathy Hoffman in the general election.

=== Republican primary ===
==== Candidates ====
- Robert Branch, Grand Canyon University professor
- Diane Douglas, incumbent superintendent of public instruction
- Jonathan Gelbart, director of charter school development for Basis Schools
- Tracy Livingston, Maricopa County Community College District board member
- Frank Riggs, former U.S. representative for California's 1st congressional district (1995–1999), candidate for U.S. Senate for California in 1998, candidate for Governor of Arizona in 2006 and 2014

==== Endorsements ====
Tracy Livingston

Federal officials

- Debbie Lesko, U.S. representative

State and local officials

- Lisa Graham Keegan, former Superintendent of Public Instruction
- Jaime Molera, former Superintendent of Public Instruction
- Steven Yarbrough, President of Arizona Senate
- Sylvia Allen, state senator
- Karen Fann, state senator
- JD Mesnard, Arizona House Speaker
- Kevin Payne, state representative.
- Vince Leach, state representative.
- Todd Clodfelter, state representative.
- Paul Boyer, state representative
- Drew John, state representative.
- David Livingston, state representative
- Sal Dicicio, Phoenix City Councilman
Frank Riggs

Individuals

- Ernest Garfield, former state treasurer
- Adam Kwasman, former state representative.
- Jim Waring, Phoenix City Councilman and former state senator.
- Jake Hoffman, Queen Creek Town Councilman.
- Jared Taylor, Gilbert Town Councilman.
- Jim Lane, Mayor of Scottsdale
Jonathan Gelbart

Individuals

- James Kolbe, former congressman
- Rich Crandall, former state senator
- Kevin Thompson, Mesa City councilmember
- Chris Glover, Mesa City councilmember

==== Primary results ====
Republican primary results
Party	Candidate	Votes	%
Republican	Frank Riggs	124,872	21.82%
Republican	Bob Branch	124,623	21.78%
Republican	Diane Douglas (incumbent)	121,452	21.23%
Republican	Tracy Livingston	115,778	20.23%
Republican	Jonathan Gelbart	85,511	14.94%
Total votes		572,236	100%

=== Democratic primary ===
==== Candidates ====
===== Declared =====
- Kathy Hoffman, Peoria Unified School District speech therapist
- David Schapira, high school administrator for the East Valley Institute of Technology and former state senator (2011–2013)

==== Primary results ====
Democratic primary results
Party	Candidate	Votes	%
Democratic	Kathy Hoffman	254,566	52.27%
Democratic	David Schapira	232,419	47.73%
Total votes		486,985	100%

=== General election ===
==== Polling ====
Poll source	Date(s) administered	Sample size	Margin of error	Frank Riggs (R)	Kathy Hoffman (D)	Undecided
OH Predictive Insights	September 5–6, 2018	597	± 4.0%	41%	39%	20%

==== Results ====
Results by county Hoffman: 50–60%; 60–70%; 70–80%; Riggs: 50–60%; 60–70%; 70–80%

Arizona Superintendent of Public Instruction, 2018
Party	Candidate	Votes	%
Democratic	Kathy Hoffman	1,185,457	51.56%
Republican	Frank Riggs	1,113,781	48.44%
Write-in		89	0.00%
Total votes		2,299,327	100%
Democratic gain from Republican			

== Mine Inspector ==
Incumbent Republican Mine Inspector Joe Hart won re-election to a fourth term.

=== Republican primary ===
==== Candidates ====
===== Declared =====
- Joe Hart, incumbent Mine Inspector

==== Primary results ====
Republican primary results
Party	Candidate	Votes	%
Republican	Joe Hart (incumbent)	546,189	100.0
Total votes		546,189	100.0

=== Democratic primary ===
==== Candidates ====
===== Declared =====
- William Pierce, engineer

==== Primary results ====
Democratic primary results
Party	Candidate	Votes	%
Democratic	William "Bill" Pierce	447,924	100.0
Total votes		447,924	100.0

=== Libertarian primary ===
==== Candidates ====
===== Declared =====
- Kim Ruff (write-in candidate)

==== Primary results ====
Libertarian primary results
Party	Candidate	Votes	%
Libertarian	Kim Ruff (write-in)	2,106	100.0
Total votes		2,144	100.0

=== General election ===
==== Results ====
County results Hart: 50–60% 60–70% 70–80% Pierce: 50–60% 60–70% 70–80%

2018 Arizona Mine Inspector election
Party	Candidate	Votes	%
Republican	Joe Hart (incumbent)	1,168,798	51.74%
Democratic	William Pierce	1,090,346	48.26%
Total votes		2,259,144	100%
Republican hold			

== Corporation Commission ==
2018 Arizona Corporation Commission election
- November 6, 2018
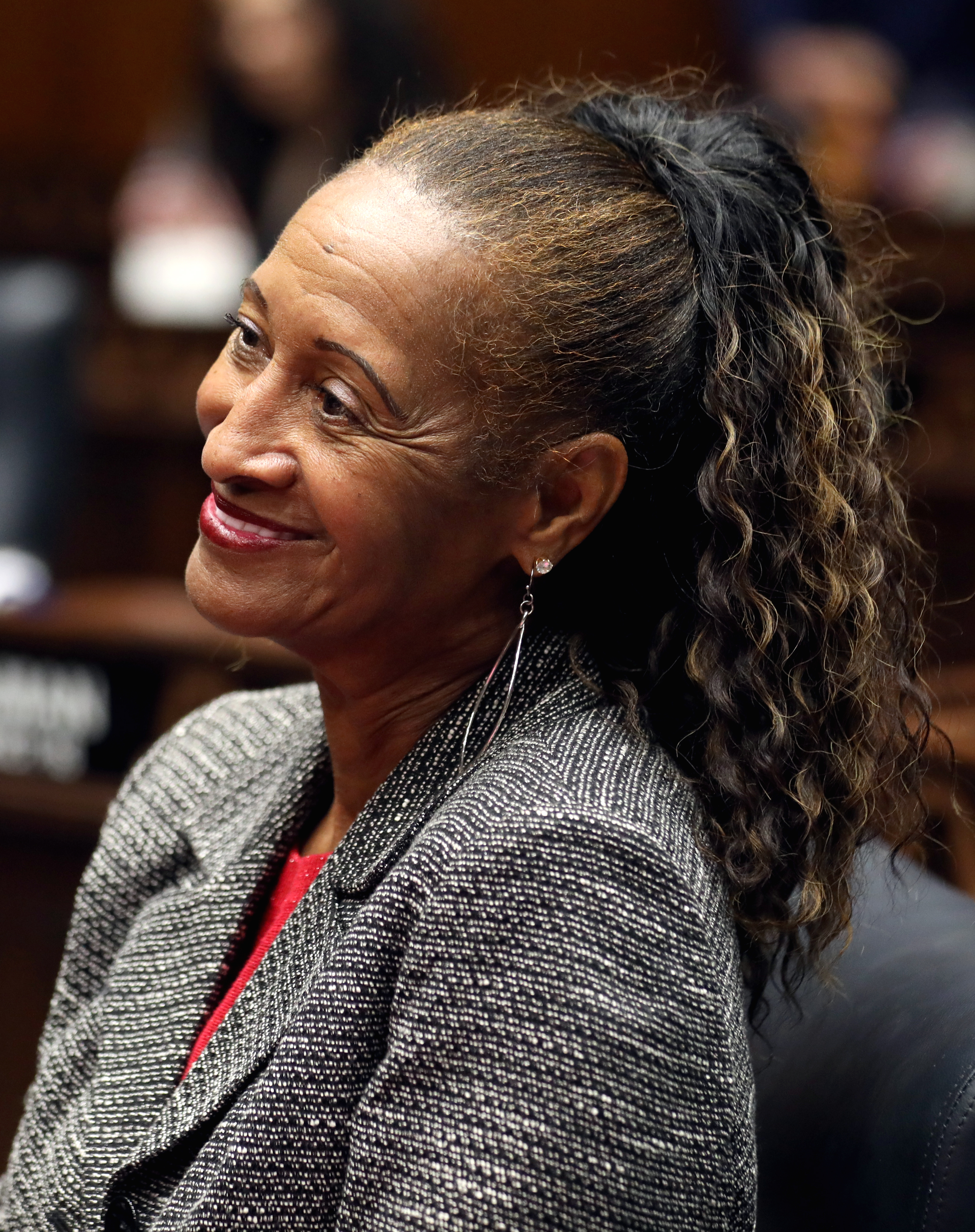

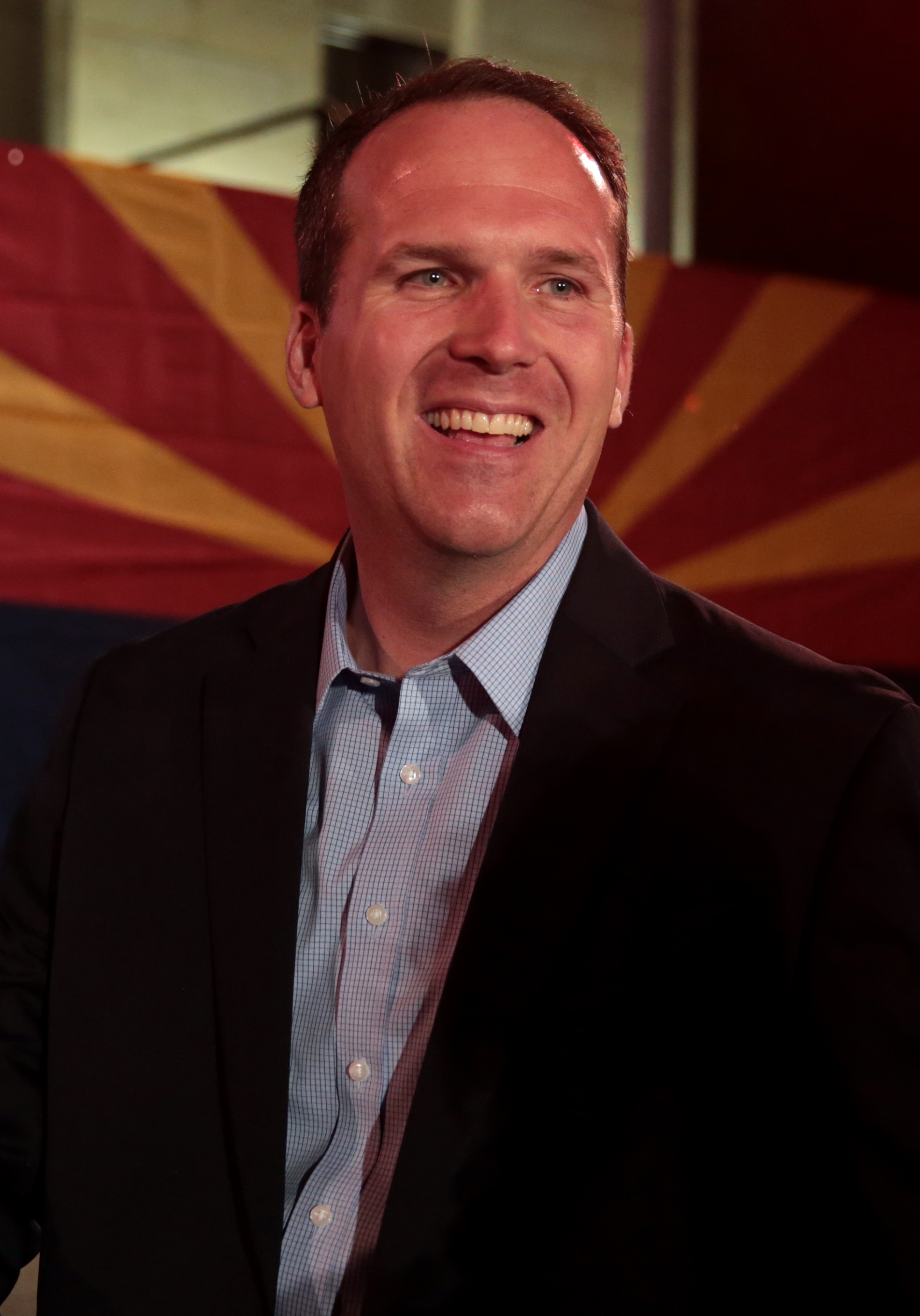

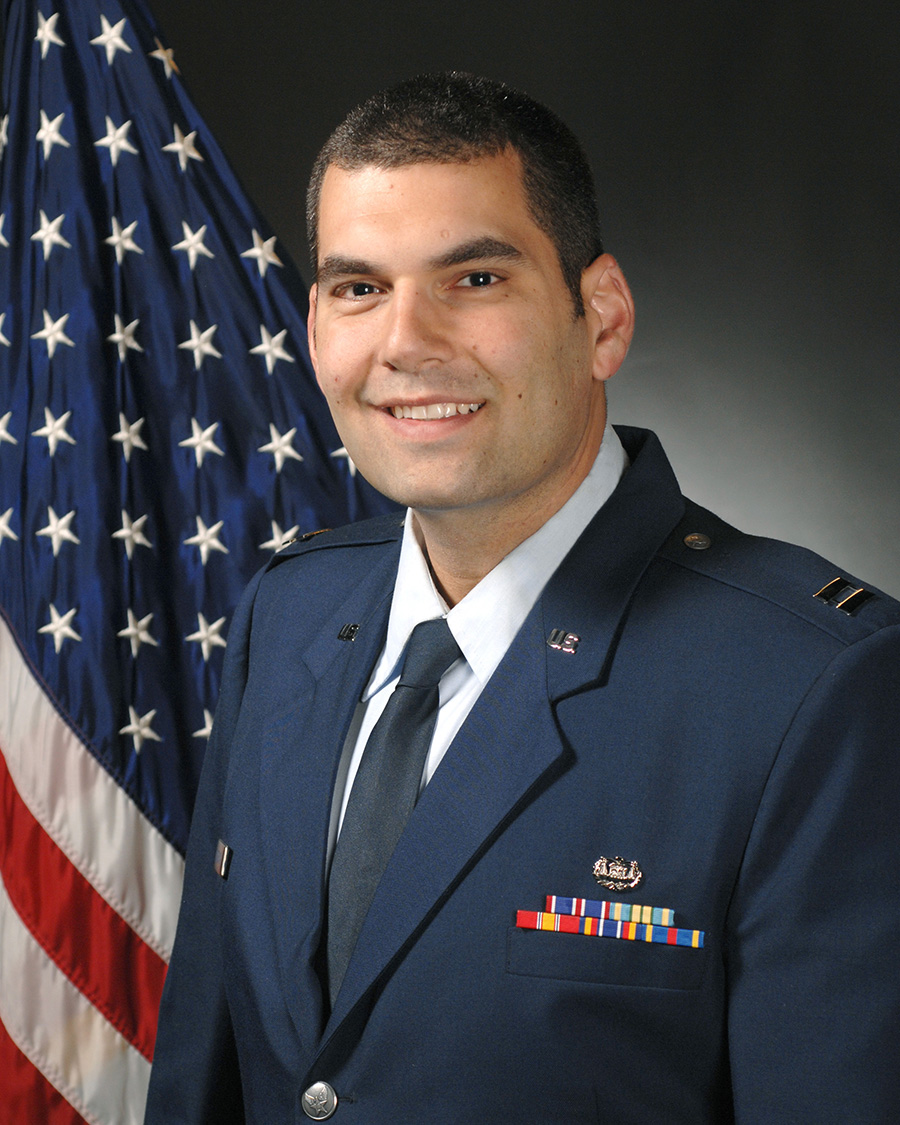
Nominee	Sandra Kennedy	Justin Olson
Party	Democratic	Republican
Popular vote	1,076,800	1,053,862
Percentage	25.72%	25.17%
Nominee	Rodney Glassman	Kiana Sears
Party	Republican	Democratic
Popular vote	1,049,394	1,006,654
Percentage	25.06%	24.04%
Commissioners before election
Justin Olson (R)
Tom Forese (R)
Elected Commissioners
Justin Olson (R)
Sandra Kennedy (D)

"Corporation Commissioners must only satisfy the standard requirements for all Arizona state officers, who must be at least 18 years old, a citizen of the United States and able to speak English." Two of the seats on the Arizona Corporation Commission are up for election, elected by plurality block voting.

=== Republican primary ===
==== Candidates ====
===== Declared =====
- Tom Forese, incumbent Corporation Commissioner
- Rodney Glassman, former Tucson city councilman and Democratic nominee for U.S. Senate in 2010
- James "Jim" O'Connor, former investment law advisor for the California State Senate
- Justin Olson, incumbent Corporation Commissioner
- Eric Sloan, small business owner

===== Declined =====
- Doug Little, former Corporation Commissioner (2015–2017)

==== Endorsements ====
Rodney Glassman

Individuals

- Bill Montgomery, Maricopa County Attorney

==== Primary results ====
Republican primary results
Party	Candidate	Votes	%
Republican	Justin Olson (incumbent)	240,825	25.18%
Republican	Rodney Glassman	218,130	22.81%
Republican	James "Jim" O'Connor	206,929	21.64%
Republican	Tom Forese (incumbent)	152,395	15.93%
Republican	Eric Sloan	138,051	14.44%
Total votes		956,330	100%

=== Democratic primary ===
==== Candidates ====
===== Declared =====
- Sandra Kennedy, former Corporation Commissioner (2009–2013), former state senator (1993–2000), and former state representative (1987–1992)
- William Mundell, former Republican Corporation Commissioner (1999–2009) and former Republican state representative (1986–1992)
- Kiana Sears, Mesa Public Schools governing board member

==== Primary results ====
Democratic primary results
Party	Candidate	Votes	%
Democratic	Sandra Kennedy	351,561	45.10%
Democratic	Kiana Sears	219,011	28.10%
Democratic	William "Bill" Mundell	208,941	26.80%
Total votes		779,513	100%

=== General election ===
==== Results ====
Arizona Corporation Commission election, 2018
Party	Candidate	Votes	%
Democratic	Sandra Kennedy	1,076,800	25.72%
Republican	Justin Olson (incumbent)	1,053,862	25.17%
Republican	Rodney Glassman	1,049,394	25.06%
Democratic	Kiana Sears	1,006,654	24.04%
Write-in		232	0.01%
Total votes		4,186,942	100%
Democratic gain from Republican			
Republican hold			

== Supreme Court ==
Two justices on the Arizona Supreme Court were up for retention in 2018.

=== Justice Bolick retention ===
Results by county Yes: 60–70%; 70–80%; 80–90%

Clint Bolick was appointed by Governor Doug Ducey in 2016 to succeed retiring justice Rebecca White Berch.

Justice Bolick retention, 2018
Choice	Votes	%
For	1,187,184	70.04
Against	507,800	29.96
Total	1,694,984	100.00
Source: Arizona Secretary of State

=== Justice Pelander retention ===
Results by county Yes: 60–70%; 70–80%; 80–90%

John Pelander was appointed by Governor Jan Brewer in 2009 to succeed retiring justice Ruth McGregor. He was retained by the voters in 2012.

Justice Pelander retention, 2018
Choice	Votes	%
For	1,188,576	71.75
Against	467,934	28.25
Total	1,656,510	100.00
Source: Arizona Secretary of State

== State Legislature ==
All 30 members of the Arizona State Senate and all 60 members of the Arizona House of Representatives were up for election. Democrats flipped four state house districts.

=== State Senate ===
Party	Before	After	Change
Republican	17	17	Steady
Democratic	13	13	Steady
Total	30	30	Steady

=== House of Representatives ===
Party	Before	After	Change
Republican	35	31	▼4
Democratic	25	29	▲4
Total	60	60	Steady

== State ballot measures ==
Arizona had five statewide propositions on the ballot in 2018.

2018 Arizona ballot propositions
No.	Description	Votes				Type
No.	Description	Yes	%	No	%	Type
125	Allows for adjustments to the retirement plans of corrections officers and elected officials.	1,130,219	51.72	1,055,201	48.28	Legislatively referred constitutional amendment
126	Prohibits the government from increasing taxes on services in the future.	1,436,106	64.09	804,794	35.91	Citizen-initiated constitutional amendment
127	Requires 50% of energy to come from renewable resources by 2030.	723,138	31.40	1,580,101	68.60	Citizen-initiated constitutional amendment
305	Upholds SB 1431 (2018), expanding the Empowerment Scholarship Accounts program.	790,608	35.17	1,457,070	64.83	Veto referendum
306	Designates unlawful contributions from clean election accounts and removes commission exemption from rulemaking requirements.	1,248,675	56.19	973,385	43.81	Legislatively referred state statute
Source: Arizona Secretary of State

Results by county

Proposition 125 results by county
Yes:
- 50–60%
No:
- 50–60%

Proposition 126 results by county
Yes:
- 50–60%
- 60–70%
- 70–80%

Proposition 127 results by county
No:
- 50–60%
- 60–70%
- 70–80%
- 80–90%

Proposition 305 results by county
No:
- 50–60%
- 60–70%

Proposition 306 results by county
Yes:
- 50–60%
No:
- 50–60%
