= Lorena Austin =

American politician

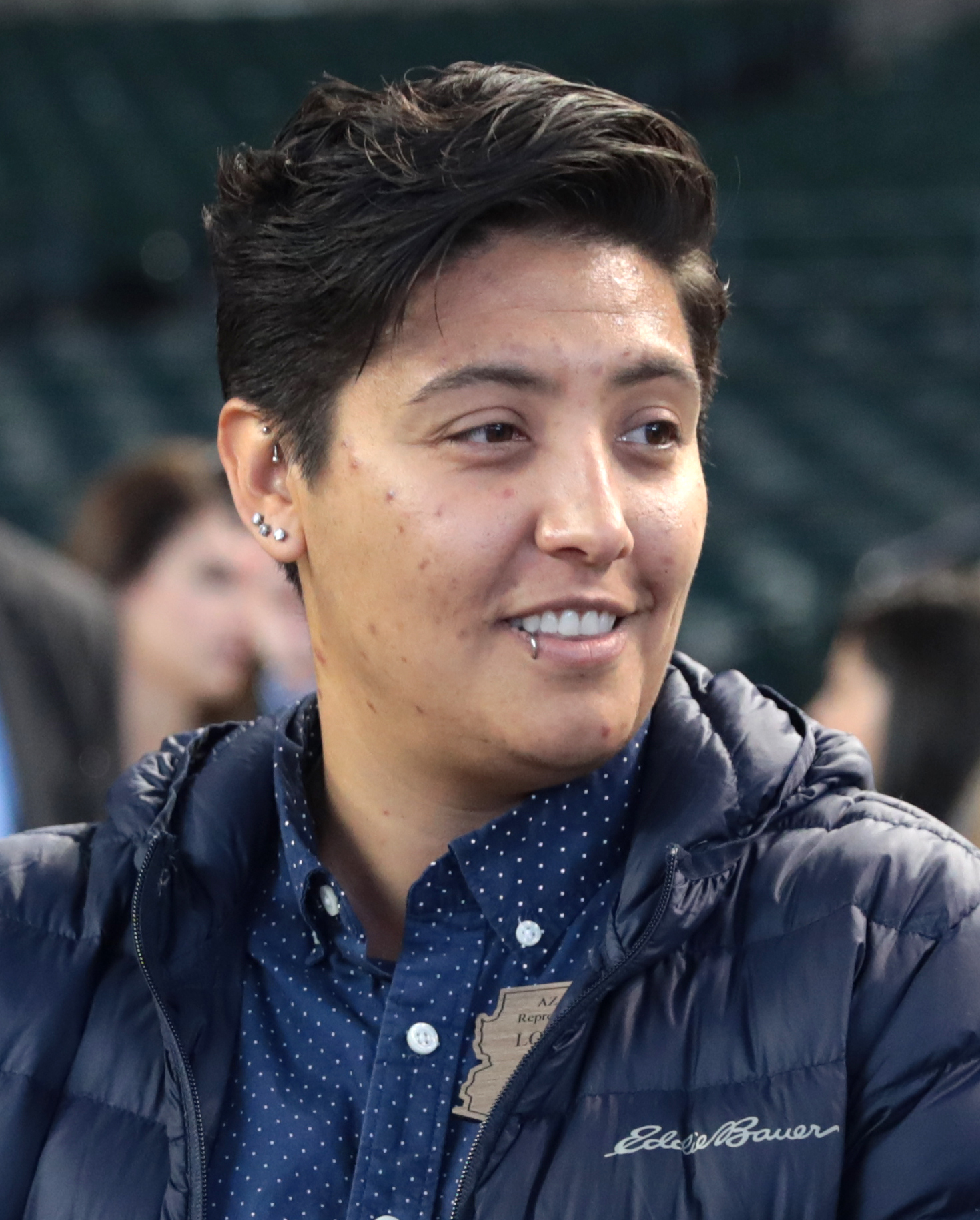
- Austin in 2023

Member of the Arizona House of Representatives from the 9th district
- Incumbent
- Assumed office January 9, 2023 Serving with Seth Blattman
- Preceded by: Pamela Hannley

Personal details
- Party: Democratic
- Education: Arizona State University
- Website: Campaign Website

Lorena Austin is an American politician and Democratic member of the Arizona House of Representatives, elected to represent the state's 9th legislative district in 2022. Austin is nonbinary and Chicane.

== Early life and education ==
Austin is a fifth-generation Arizonan, and a native of Mesa, Arizona. They attended Mesa Community College, and received their degree from Arizona State University. Austin has worked as a project manager for the Maricopa County Community College District.

== Elections ==
- 2022 Arizona House of Representatives election: Austin and Seth Blattman were unchallenged in the Democratic Primary, and they went on to defeat Republican nominees Kathy Pearce and Mary Ann Mendoza in the general election.
