= Kevin Thompson (politician) =

American politician

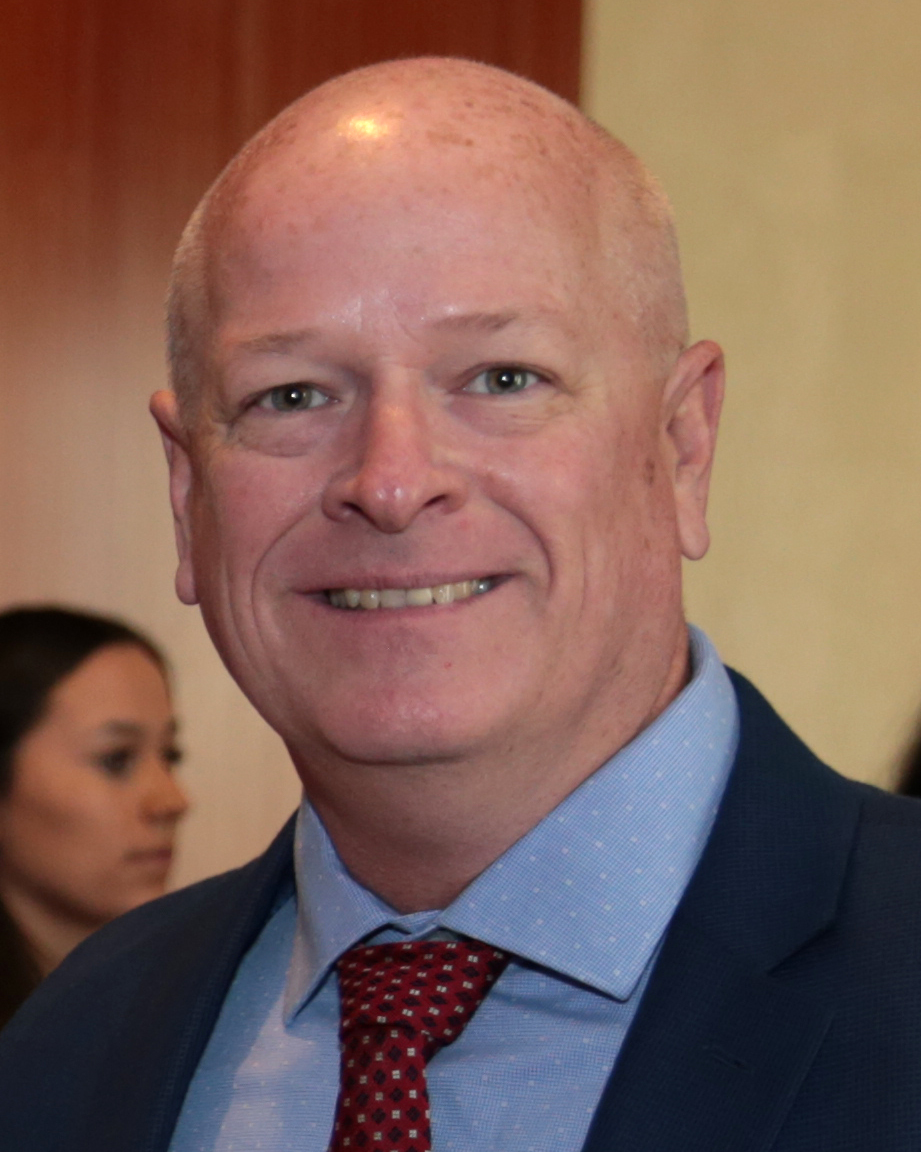
- Thompson in 2018

Member of the Arizona Corporation Commission
- Incumbent
- Assumed office January 3, 2023
- Preceded by: Sandra Kennedy

Personal details
- Born: West Monroe, Louisiana, U.S.
- Party: Republican
- Children: 2
- Education: University of Nevada, Las Vegas (BS)
- Website: Campaign website

Military service
- Allegiance: United States
- Branch/service: United States Air Force
- Battles/wars: Operation Desert Storm

Kevin Thompson is an American politician who is a member of the Arizona Corporation Commission. A member of the Republican Party, Thompson previously served as a member of the Mesa City Council from the 6th district from January 2015 to January 2023 prior to being elected to the Commission in November 2022.

== Personal life and education ==
Born in West Monroe, Louisiana, Thompson and his family moved to Dallas, Texas, when he was a year old, and later to Euless, Texas, where he grew up.

At the age of 19, Thompson joined the United States Air Force. After completing his basic training in San Antonio, Texas, he relocated to Aurora, Colorado, for technical school where he received training on the F-111 weapons platform. After graduating from technical school, Kevin married his wife, Donna. Thompson would go on to spend eight years in the service, serving in many missions including a deployment to Operation Desert Storm from August 1990 to February 1991. After the cease fire, Thompson received orders and relocated to Las Vegas, NV. He received an Honorable Discharge in 1996.

After his service, Thompson went on to complete a Bachelors of Science in Mechanical Engineering from the University of Nevada, Las Vegas, (UNLV) with an emphasis in Metallurgy.

In 1998, he was recruited to work for Southwest Gas. Thompson spent 12 years in Operations, working his way up to Manager of Engineering, before transitioning to Government Relations during the Great Recession, where he spent another 5 years. After 17 years, Thompson left the utility in late 2014 having been elected to the Mesa City Council.

Thompson has given back to the community serving on various boards, including The Centers for Habilitation, MesaCAN, Mesa United Food Bank, and Mesa Chamber of Commerce. He has represented the City of Mesa as the President of the Arizona Municipal Water Users Association, National League of Cities Community and Economic Development Committee, and the American Public Gas Association’s Government Relations Committee. As a Commissioner, Thompson represents Arizona on the National Association of Regulatory Utility Commissioners (NARUC) Board of Directors and on the Electric Committee, as well as the Critical consumer issues forum Advisory Council

Thompson is the principal owner of his consulting firm, Broadmore Consulting. He and his wife Donna have two children.

== Military Service ==
Thompson joined the United States Air Force in 1987 on delayed enlistment, and left for Basic Training in San Antonio, TX in March 1988. While in Basic Training, he received his Armed Force Specialty Code (AFSC) as a 462XO (Aircraft Armament Systems Specialist). Thompson received orders in April 1988 to Aurora, CO to train on the General Dynamics F-111 weapons system. Upon graduation from training, he received orders to RAF Upper Heyford, Oxfordshire, England, joining the 79th Tactical Fighter Squadron. Thompson spent 3 years at RAF Upper Heyford, and was deployed to Southwest Asia in 1990 in support of Operation Desert Shield/Desert Storm.

In July 1990, the 79th TFS, 20th Tactical Fighter Wing was deployed to Adana, Turkey for Weapons Training Deployment (TDY) and live munition training. Days before the 79th TFS was to return to its home base, Saddam's forces invaded Kuwait, and the 79th TFS was held in place to deter further aggression. As the United States State Department negotiated with the Turkish government over use of Turkish airspace to fly missions into northern Iraq, the 79th TFS acted as a decoy leading into Operation Desert Shield. After weeks of negotiations, the 79th joined the 7440th Consolidated Wing and launched attacks into Iraq just after midnight on January 18, 1991. The 79th TFS returned to their home base in England on March 9, 1991. For his service in England and Desert Shield/Desert Storm, Thompson received the Air Force Achievement Medal with 1 Device, Air Force Commendation Medal, Southwest Asia Medal with 2 Devices, National Defense Service Medal, Outstanding Unit Award, and Meritorious Unit Award.

Thompson received orders in June 1991 to Nellis AFB, Las Vegas, NV where he joined the 57th Wing, 57th Aircraft Generation Squadron. At Nellis, Thompson retrained on the General Dynamics F-16 weapons system. After a year serving in the 57th AGS, he was reassigned to 57th Weapons Standardization where he became an instructor/evaluator tasked with training USAF and its allies on the F-16 weapons system and associated munitions and missiles.

Thompson received an Honorable Discharge in 1996 after 8 years of serving his Country.

== Political career ==
=== Mesa ===
Thompson was elected to the City of Mesa Council, representing District 6, in the Primary in August 2014, and sworn into office in January 2015. Just the 3rd Councilmember elected to fill the seat, he was re-elected for a second term in 2018, running unopposed in the general election. Thompson was sworn into office the second time in January 2019. His term on Mesa's City Council ended on January 3, 2023.

During his time on council, Thompson was focused on bringing economic opportunities to the community, and supporting public safety. Thompson served as a champion of Economic Development during his tenure on council, and developed the vision for much of the economic development and growth that southeast Mesa experienced from 2015 to 2023. Thompson also fought to increase pay and the number of sworn members for Mesa Fire and Medical as well as Mesa Law Enforcement.

Thompson was instrumental in the City adopting Quality Development Design Guidelines in December 2019, which not only built in assurances for developers, but also set the expectation for the quality of development the City desired.

=== Arizona Corporation Commission ===
Thompson announced that he was running for a seat on the Arizona Corporation Commission in 2022. His campaign focused on finding efficiencies in how the Commission runs day-to-day operations, secure pay raises for employees, fill vacant positions, and ensure reliability and resiliency in Arizona's energy grid.

Thompson and fellow Republican Nick Myers won the Primary as the top vote getters, and went on to win the general election in November.

== Electoral history ==
Arizona Corporation Commission election, 2022
Party	Candidate	Votes	%
Republican	Kevin Thompson	1,190,555	26.02
Republican	Nick Myers	1,189,991	26.01
Democratic	Sandra Kennedy (incumbent)	1,133,292	24.77
Democratic	Lauren Kuby	1,061,021	23.19
Total votes		4,574,859	100.0
Republican hold			
Republican gain from Democratic			

Political offices
Preceded by Sandra Kennedy	Member of the Arizona Corporation Commission; 2023–present	Incumbent
