= Eva Burch =

American politician

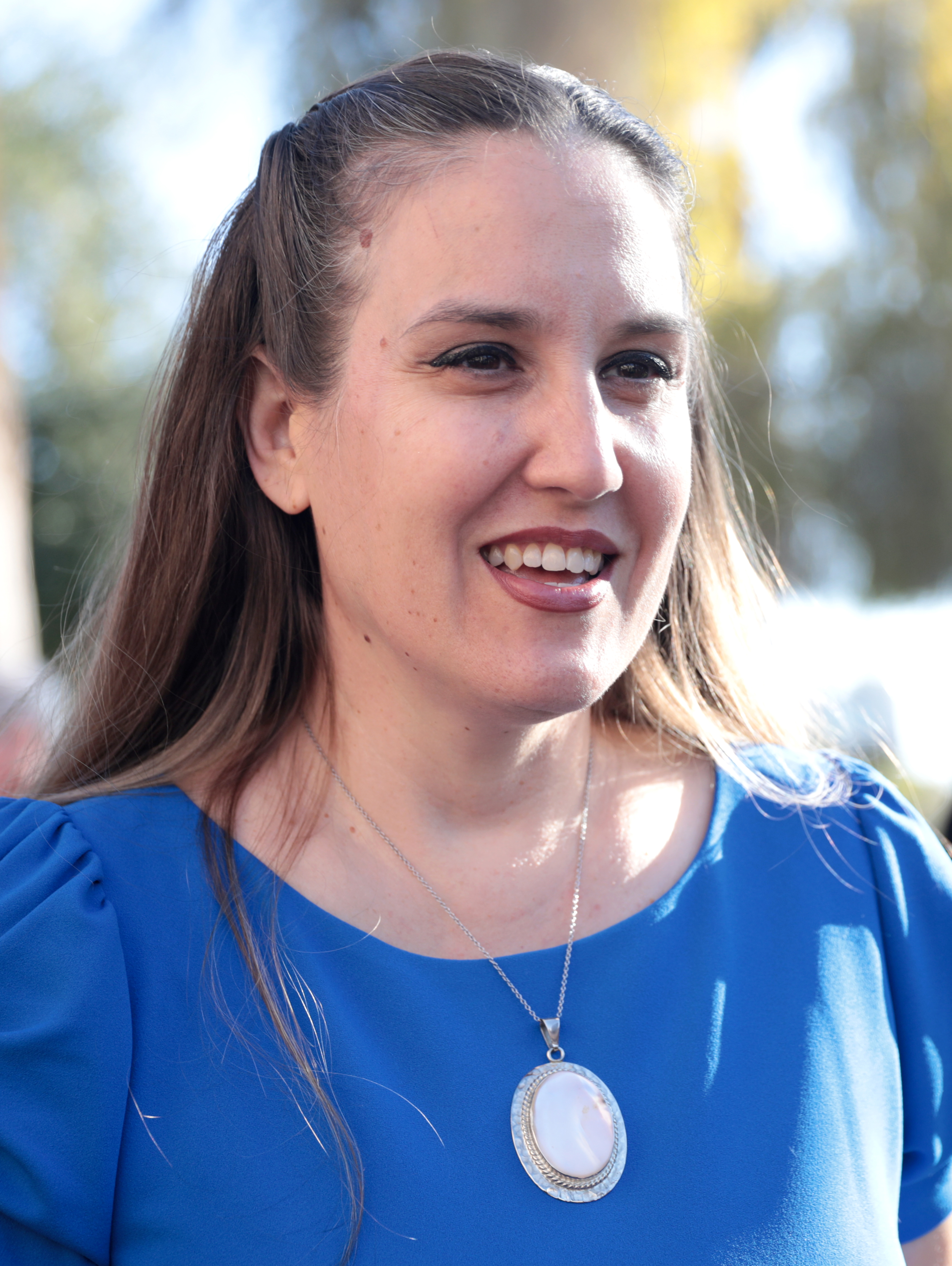

Member of the Arizona Senate from the 9th district
- In office January 9, 2023 – March 14, 2025
- Preceded by: Tyler Pace
- Succeeded by: Kiana Sears

Personal details
- Party: Democratic
- Education: Pima Medical Institute

Eva Burch is an American politician and nurse. Burch was elected in 2022 to serve in the Arizona State Senate representing District 9 as a member of the Democratic Party. Burch defeated Republican Robert Scantlebury in the general election. On March 5, 2025, Burch announced that she will be resigning from her position of State Senator, no later than March 14, 2025.

== Education ==
Burch attended the Pima Medical Institute, and began a career in emergency nursing in 2012, later obtaining her master's degree and nurse practitioner credentials.

== Public statements on reproductive rights ==
In an effort to personalize the debate over reproductive rights, Burch has spoken publicly about her struggles with trying to have children. She stated that she has had several miscarriages, and an abortion in 2022, after she started to miscarry a non viable fetus.

On March 18, 2024, Burch announced on the floor of the Arizona State Senate that she planned to abort her then-current pregnancy because the fetus was not viable.
