= Michelle Udall =

American politician (born 1976)

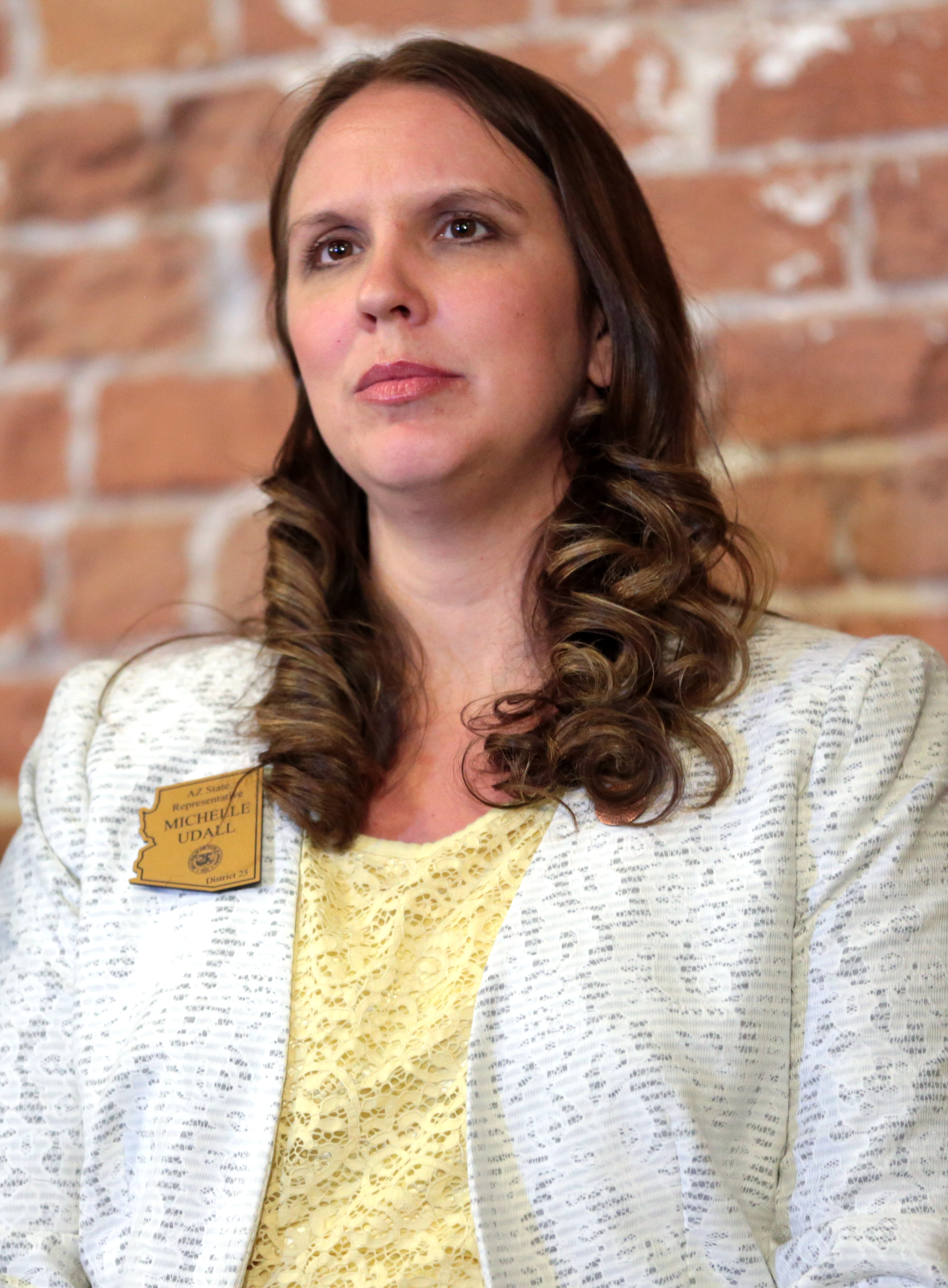
- Udall in 2017

Member of the Arizona House of Representatives from the 25th district
- In office January 9, 2017 – January 9, 2023 Serving with Russell Bowers
- Preceded by: Justin Olson
- Succeeded by: Tim Dunn

Personal details
- Born: Michelle Miles; March 23, 1976 (age 50) Mesa, Arizona, U.S.
- Party: Republican
- Spouse: Jesse Udall
- Children: 4
- Relatives: Udall family
- Education: Massachusetts Institute of Technology; Arizona State University, Tempe (BS); Grand Canyon University (MA)

Michelle Udall (née Miles; born March 23, 1976) is an American politician and a former Republican member of the Arizona House of Representatives elected to represent District 25 in 2016 until 2023. She is also a former member of the Mesa school board.

== Biography ==
Michelle Miles married Jesse Udall, the namesake grandson of Jesse Addison Udall and a member of the prominent Udall family. She has been described by The Arizona Republic as a moderate Republican.

In February 2022, Udall alongside fellow Republican Arizona House members Regina Cobb and Joanne Osborne crossed party lines to vote against HB 2811, a bill that would have banned manufacturing or prescribing medication that would cause an abortion, citing the multiple uses of those medications.

== Elections ==
In 2014, Udall was defeated in the Arizona House of Representatives District 25 Republican primary by incumbent Justin Olson and Russell Bowers.

In 2016, Udall and Bowers defeated Ross Groen in the Republican primary and went on to defeat Democrat Kathleen Rahn in the general election.
