= Seth Blattman =

American politician

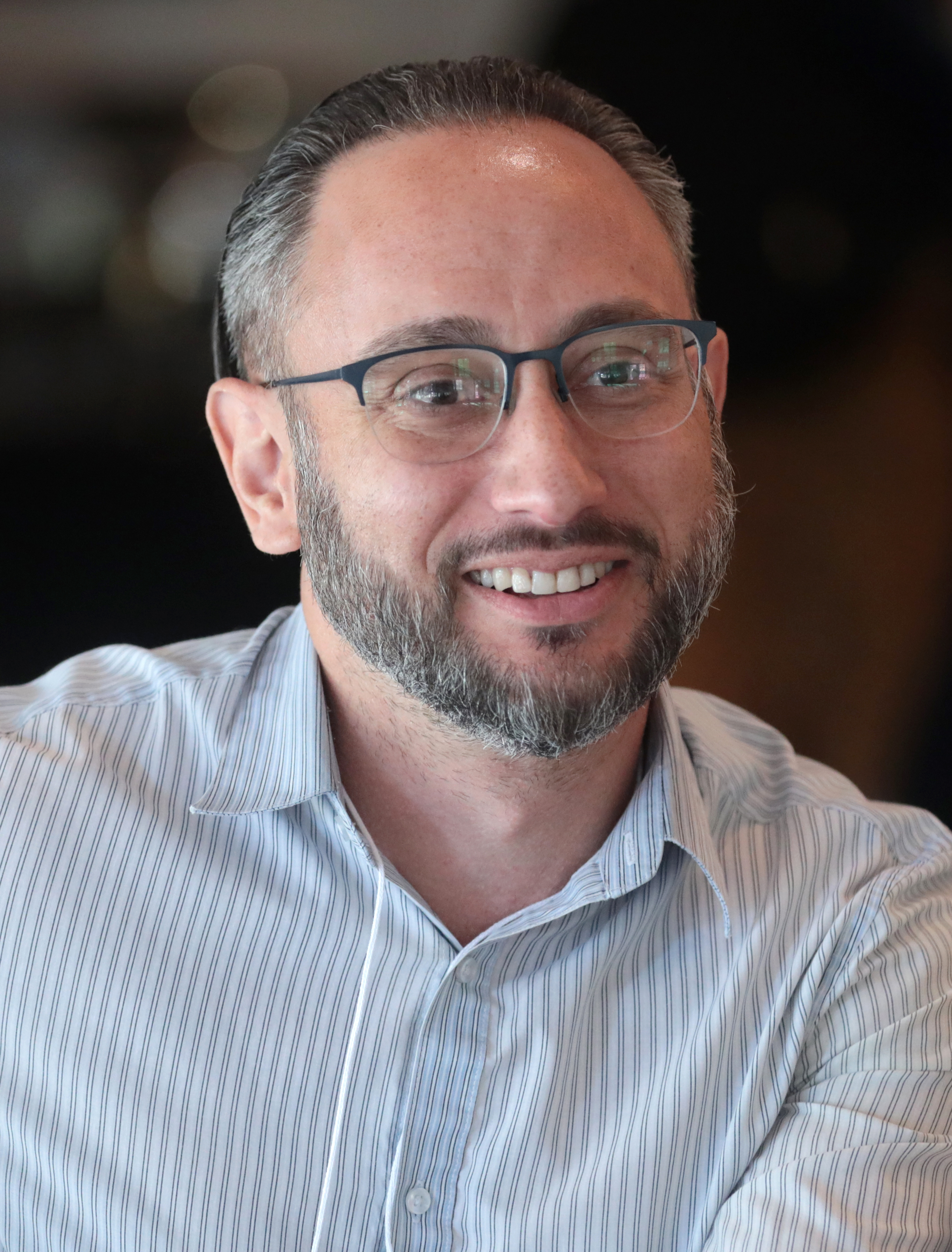
- Blattman in 2022

Member of the Arizona House of Representatives from the 9th district
- Incumbent
- Assumed office January 9, 2023 Serving with Lorena Austin
- Preceded by: Christopher Mathis
- Succeeded by: Jacob Martinez (elect)

Personal details
- Party: Democratic
- Education: Arizona State University; University of California, Los Angeles
- Website: Campaign Website

Seth Blattman is an American politician and Democratic member of the Arizona House of Representatives elected to represent District 9 in 2022. He serves as the Ranking Democratic Member on Ways and Means while also sitting on Appropriations and Military Affairs and Public Safety.

== Early life and education ==
Blattman moved to Scottsdale, Arizona as a child with his family, and later attended the University of Arizona and graduated from Arizona State University, where he received his bachelor's degree in political science. He also received his MBA from the University of California, Los Angeles. After, he worked for his family's furniture business. He is Jewish.

== Elections ==
- 2022 Blattman and Lorena Austin were unchallenged in the Democratic Primary, and they went on to defeat Republican nominees Kathy Pearce and Mary Ann Mendoza in the general election.
