= Nick Myers =

American politician

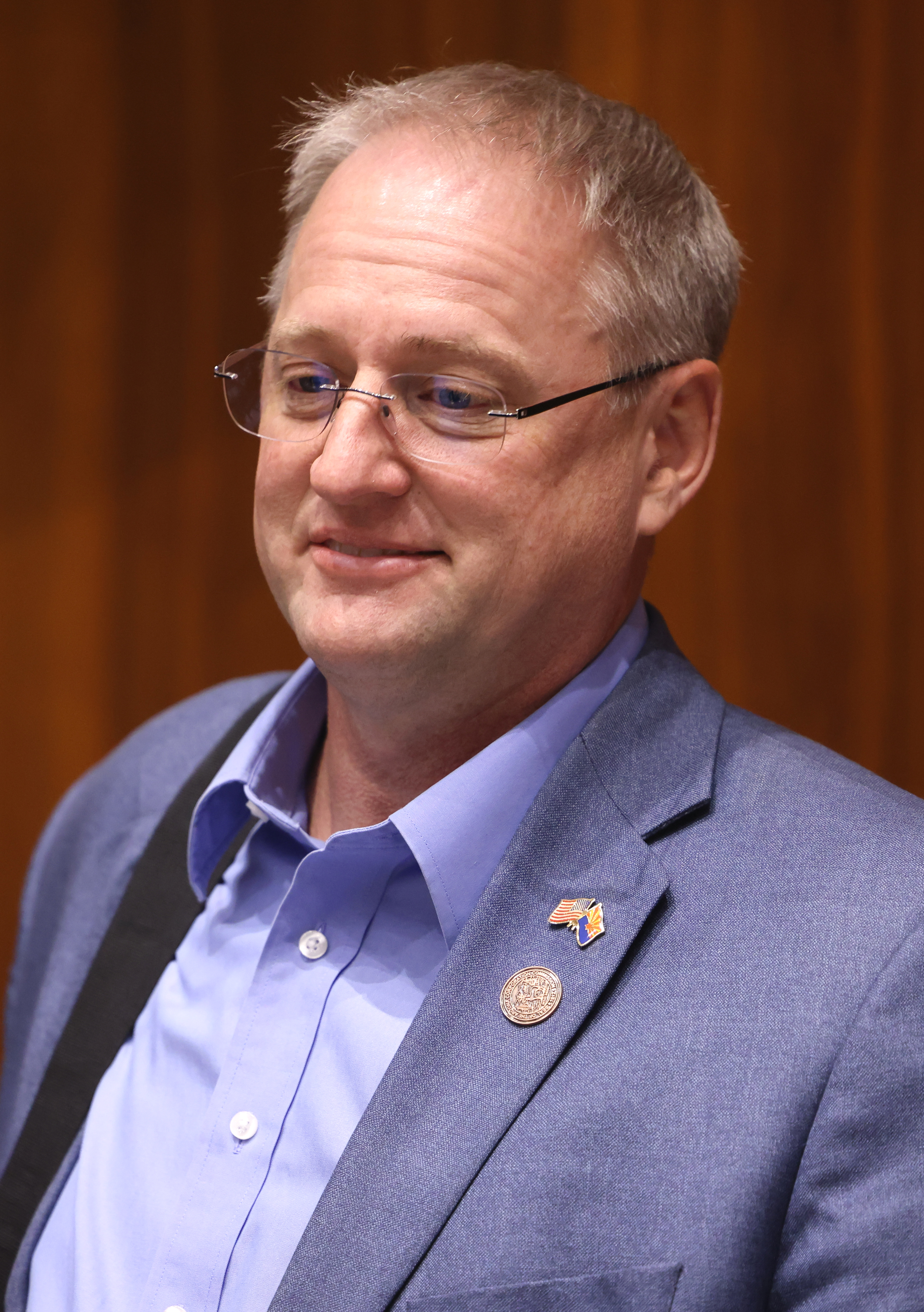
- Myers in 2025

Member of the Arizona Corporation Commission
- Incumbent
- Assumed office January 3, 2023
- Preceded by: Justin Olson

Personal details
- Born: Kansas, U.S.
- Party: Republican
- Education: University of Kansas (BS)

Nick Myers is an American politician who currently serves as the Chairman of the Arizona Corporation Commission, first being elected in the 2022 election. Prior to serving in the commission, Myers worked as an embedded software engineer in the semiconductor and communications industries, before starting his own small businesses.

== Early life, education & career ==
Myers was born in Kansas, and went to the University of Kansas. He then worked as a software engineer for Unisys Corporation, followed by Comtech EF Data, for about 18 years. Following this, he started his own small businesses which ranged from running a train service for children's birthday parties to hauling water to rural residents, as well as dog boarding.

== Political career ==
Myers began his political career as a policy advisor to Justin Olson, whom he would later succeed as a member of the Arizona Corporation Commission. Myers ran for the Arizona House of Representatives in 2018, but placed in a distant fourth in Republican primary, losing to Warren Petersen and Travis Grantham, and another candidate.

In 2016, Myers filed a complaint with the Arizona Corporation Commission, after his water-hauling business had been cut off by Johnson Utilities, a then water utility company in the San Tan Valley area. The complaint eventually led to the restoration of Myers's services. In the process it was identified that Johnson Utilities had numerous problems which eventually lead to an interim manager (the first time a Class A utility had an interim manager forced upon them) and eventual sale of the company.

In 2022, Myers ran again for public office, alongside Kevin Thompson as the Republican slate for the two open seats on the Arizona Corporation Commission. Along with Thompson, he defeated incumbent Commissioner Sandra Kennedy in the general election, as well as Lauren Kuby, both of whom ran as Democrats. During his time as commissioner, Myers has opposed clean energy mandates, and solar subsidies, stating that the solar industry "should stand on its own two feet."

Myers has also questioned the current disconnect rules imposed by a previous commission stating that he believes the rules "may be causing more harm than good". Generally, utilities regulated by the Arizona Corporation Commission may not disconnect a customer’s service during a long window from mid spring to mid fall.

== Personal life ==
Myers lives with his wife and three children in Pinal County, Arizona.

Political offices
Preceded by Justin Olson	Member of the Arizona Corporation Commission; 2023–present	Incumbent
