= American Public Gas Association =

US non-profit trade organization

APGA
- Logo
- Formation: 1961
- Type: Trade Association
- Headquarters: Washington, DC
- Location: Washington, DC 20002
- Members: 730+
- President & C.E.O.: Dave Schryver
- Website: www.apga.org

The American Public Gas Association (APGA) is a not for profit trade organization representing America's publicly owned, natural gas local distribution companies (LDCs). APGA represents the interests of public gas before the United States Congress, federal agencies and other energy-related stakeholders by developing regulatory and legislative policies.

== History ==
The American Public Gas Association began out of a need to provide a voice for municipal gas systems. In November 1961, the founding fathers, J.H. Johnston of Memphis, TN; F.H. King of Holyoke, Massachusetts; E. Switzer of Macon, Missouri; A. Verrips of Sioux Center, Iowa, and C. Wheatley of Washington, D.C., as well as representatives from systems in 14 states, met in Washington, DC, to establish a nationally recognized organization to advocate on behalf of the Nation's public gas systems.

The group appointed Mr. Francis H. King of Holyoke, Massachusetts, as the Chairman of APGA pending the election of a President at the first annual conference. A month after the November meeting, on December 8, 1961, the American Public Gas Association was officially formed with the signing of the organizational charter. During this first year, APGA had just thirty members, which number has mushroomed during the ensuing fifty years to over 700 members nationwide.

Founding Objectives: the group set forth with a wide range of objectives, including specifically to promote cooperation between public entities which own or operate gas distribution systems or gas facilities; to promote the mutual improvement of its members; to render service to its members, particularly in the fields of management • and operations; engineering, research, supply and demand, construction and safety; accounting and commercial practice; to develop comprehensive legal and legislative policy; and to find solution to common problems that affect all public gas systems.

== Membership ==
The American Public Gas Association (APGA) is the only national association of publicly owned natural gas local distribution companies and has over 730 member utilities in 38 states. The term publicly owned natural gas systems applies to municipal gas distribution systems, public utility districts, county districts and other public agencies that utilize natural gas distribution facilities.

Through APGA membership, public gas systems work together to keep informed about new developments in federal public policy and regulations, safety, operations, new technology, and the global markets that could affect the communities and consumers they serve.

APGA members participate through their association with the organization's committees. Committees include:

- Codes & Standards
- Gas Supply
- Government Relations
- Legislative Issues
- Marketing & Sales
- Natural Gas Vehicles
- Operations & Safety Issues
- Regulatory Issues

Mayors and utility board members can also be involved in the association's activities through participation in the APGA Public Gas Policy Council (PGPC). The PGPC is made up of elected and appointed officials from public gas communities across the US and assists APGA with its advocacy efforts.

The organization runs an annual conference, has testified before the United States House Committee on Energy and Commerce and sued to change US policy at the United States Department of Energy.

== See also ==
- United States energy law
