= Justin Olson =

American politician (born 1979)

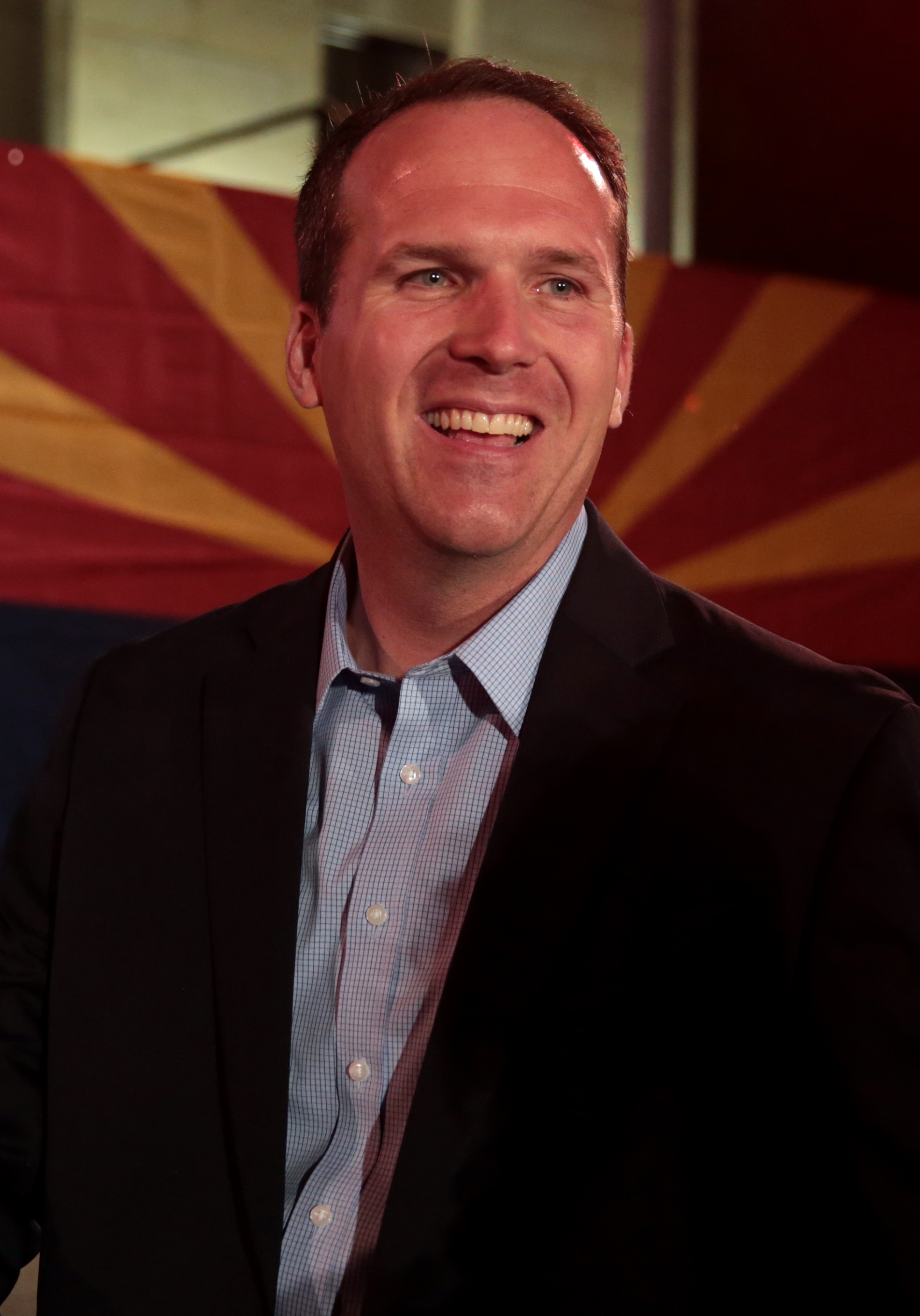
- Olson in 2018

Member of the Arizona House of Representatives
- Incumbent
- Assumed office January 13, 2025 Serving with Ralph Heap
- Preceded by: Barbara Parker
- Constituency: 10th district
- In office January 10, 2011 – January 9, 2017 Serving with Kirk Adams (2011–2013)
- Preceded by: Rich Crandall
- Succeeded by: Michelle Udall
- Constituency: 19th district (2011–2013); 25th district (2013–2017)

Member of the Arizona Corporation Commission
- In office October 17, 2017 – January 3, 2023
- Preceded by: Doug Little
- Succeeded by: Nick Myers

Personal details
- Born: 1979 (age 46–47) Mesa, Arizona, U.S.
- Party: Republican
- Education: Arizona State University, Tempe (BS, MBA)
- Website: Campaign website

Justin Olson (born 1979) is an American politician who serves as a member of the Arizona House of Representatives. He previously was a member of the Arizona Corporation Commission and also represented District 25 in the Arizona House of Representatives from 2013 until 2017. He is a member of the Republican Party.

== Early life and education ==
Olson was born in Mesa, Arizona. He earned a Bachelor of Science degree and Master of Business Administration from Arizona State University.

== Career ==
Olson is a tax analyst who worked for the University of Phoenix. From 2011 to 2017, Olson served as a member of the Arizona House of Representatives, representing the 19th and 25th districts. On October 17, 2017, Governor Doug Ducey appointed Olson to fill a vacancy on the Arizona Corporation Commission. He was elected to a full term in 2018.

In October 2021, Olson declared his candidacy for the 2022 United States Senate election in Arizona. He lost the Republican primary to Blake Masters. In 2024, he ran for and won a seat in the Arizona House of Representatives.

== Elections ==
- 2016: Olson ran in the Republican primary for Arizona's 5th congressional district, losing to Andy Biggs.
- 2014: Olson and Russell Bowers defeated Haydee Dawson, Michelle Udall and Jerry Walker in the Republican primary. Olson and Bowers defeated David Butler, Sheila Ogea, and Libertarian Michael Kielsky in the general election.
- 2012: Redistricted to District 25, and with incumbent Republican Representatives Peggy Judd leaving the Legislature and David Stevens redistricted to District 14, Olson and Justin Pierce were unopposed in the August 28, 2012, Republican primary; Pierce placed first, and Olson placed second with 18,392 votes; Pierce and Olson won the three-way November 6, 2012, general election, with Pierce taking the first seat and Olson taking the second seat with 48,335 votes against Democratic nominee David Butler.
- 2010: When incumbent Republican representative Rich Crandall ran for Arizona Senate and left a District 19 seat open, Olson ran alongside incumbent representative Kirk Adams in the three-way August 24, 2010, Republican primary, placing first with 12,386 votes; in the three-way November 2, 2010, general election, Adams took the first seat, and Olson took the second seat with 31,583 votes against Democratic nominee Kit Filbey.

Political offices
Preceded by Doug Little	Member of the Arizona Corporation Commission; 2017–2023	Succeeded by Nick Myers
