= Sandra Kennedy =

American politician (born 1957)

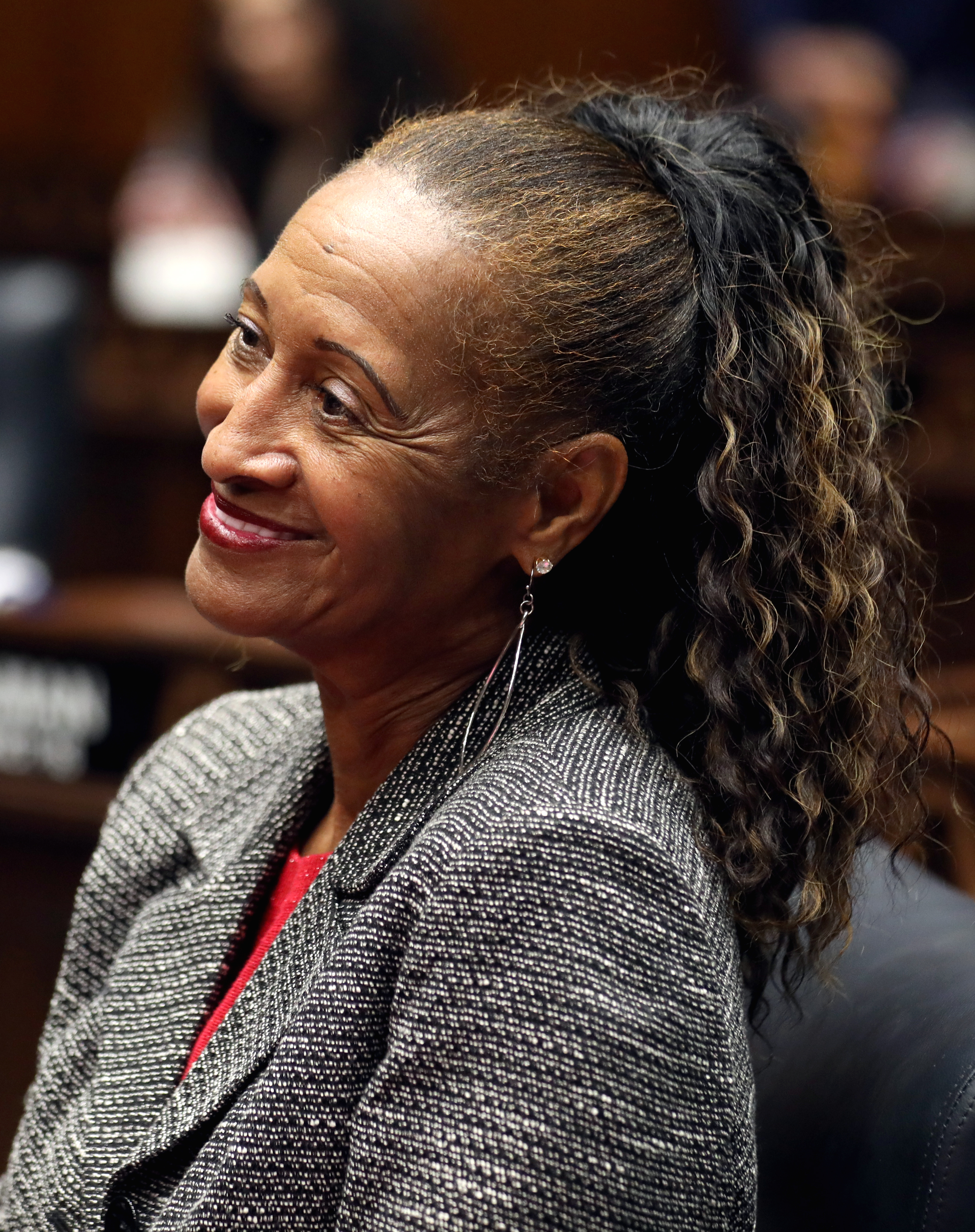

Member of the Arizona Corporation Commission
- In office January 7, 2019 – January 2, 2023
- Preceded by: Thomas Forese
- Succeeded by: Nick Myers
- In office January 5, 2009 – January 7, 2013
- Preceded by: Mike Gleason
- Succeeded by: Susan Bitter Smith

Member of the Arizona Senate from the 23rd district
- In office January 1, 1993 – December 31, 2000

Member of the Arizona House of Representatives from the 23rd district
- In office January 1, 1987 – December 31, 1992

Personal details
- Born: December 25, 1957 (age 68) Oklahoma City, Oklahoma, U.S.
- Party: Democratic
- Education: Maricopa County Community College; Arizona State University, Tempe

Sandra Kennedy (born December 25, 1957) is an American politician who is currently an elected member of the Salt River Project Board of Directors. She previously served on the Arizona Corporation Commission from 2009 to 2013 and from 2019 to 2023. Kennedy was first elected to the commission in 2008 and lost re-election in 2012. She ran again for the commission in 2014, but was defeated in the general election. In the 2018 elections she was elected back to the commission but lost re-election again in 2022. Kennedy served as a member of the state senate from 1992 to 1998 and in the Arizona House of Representatives from 1986 to 1992.

Political offices
Preceded by Mike Gleason	Member of the Arizona Corporation Commission; 2009–2013	Succeeded by Susan Bitter Smith
Preceded by Thomas Forese	Member of the Arizona Corporation Commission; 2019–2023	Succeeded by Nick Myers
