= 2020 United States Senate special election in Arizona =

- November 3, 2020
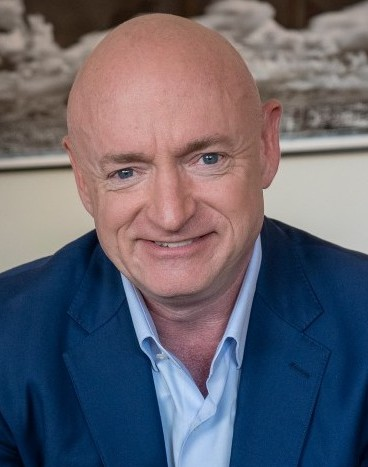

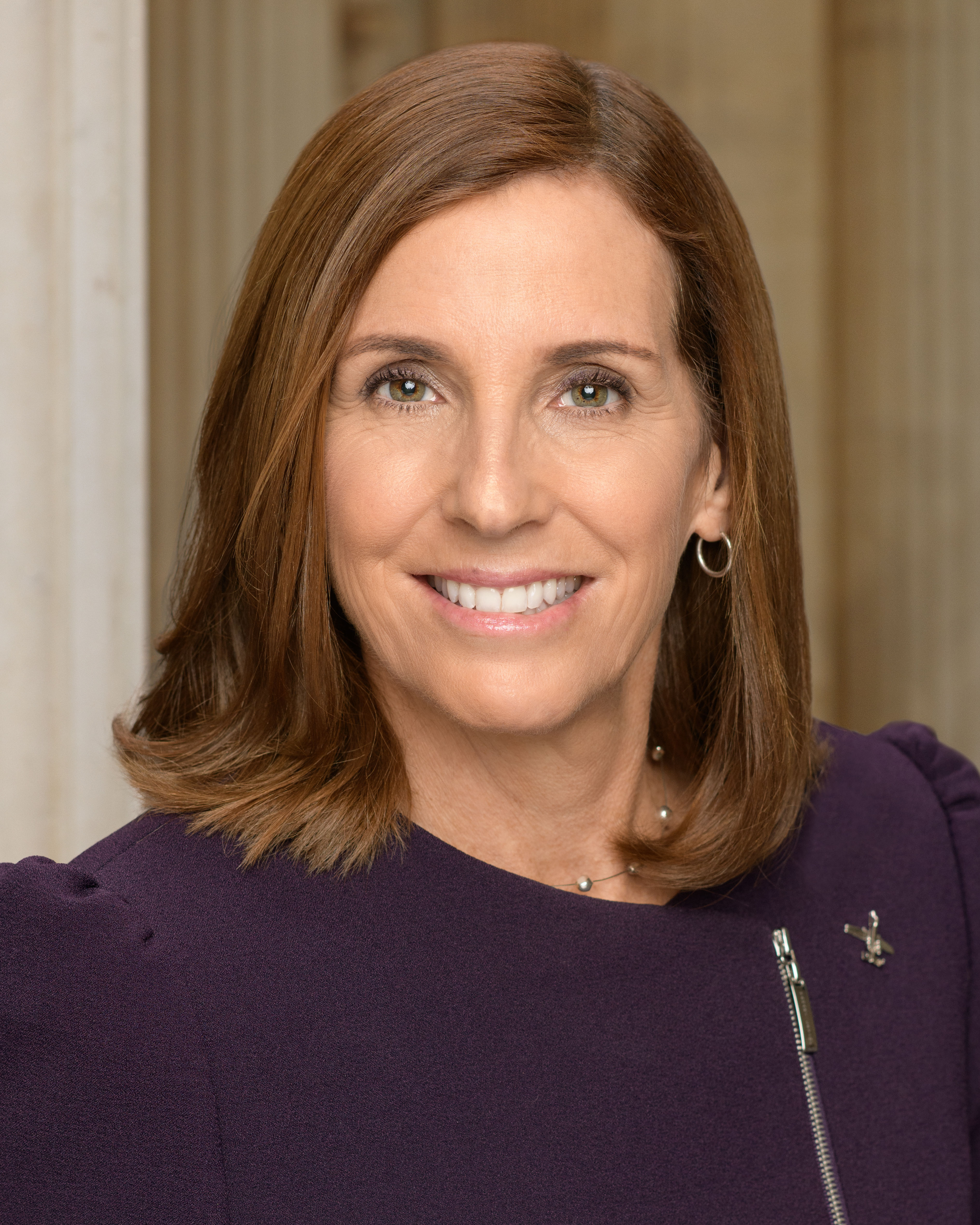
Nominee	Mark Kelly	Martha McSally
Party	Democratic	Republican
Popular vote	1,716,467	1,637,661
Percentage	51.16%	48.81%
- Kelly: 50–60% 60–70% 70–80% 80–90% >90% McSally: 50–60% 60–70% 70–80% 80–90% >90% Tie: 50% No data
U.S. senator before election
Martha McSally (Note: In December 2018, McSally was appointed by Governor Doug Ducey to fill the vacancy caused by the death of Senator John McCain and the resignation of Senator Jon Kyl.)
Republican
Elected U.S. Senator
Mark Kelly
Democratic

The 2020 United States Senate special election in Arizona was held on November 3, 2020, following the death in office of incumbent Republican U.S. Senator John McCain on August 25, 2018. Governor Doug Ducey was required by Arizona law to appoint a Republican to fill the vacant seat until a special election winner could be sworn in. On September 5, 2018, Ducey appointed former U.S. Senator Jon Kyl to fill McCain's seat. However, Kyl announced he would resign on December 31, 2018.

On December 18, 2018, Ducey announced that outgoing U.S. Representative Martha McSally would be appointed to fill the seat following Kyl's resignation. McSally was sworn in as the state's junior U.S. Senator on January 3, 2019, less than two months after she was defeated by Democrat Kyrsten Sinema for Arizona's Class 1 U.S. Senate seat. McSally ran to complete the term, defeating skincare executive Daniel McCarthy in the Republican primary. She faced former astronaut Mark Kelly, who ran uncontested in the Democratic primary. Primary elections took place on August 4, 2020.

Once a reliably Republican state, Arizona trended more purple in the late 2010s. Kelly significantly outraised McSally and led by about 5% in the average poll leading up to Election Day.

Kelly defeated McSally by a margin of 2.4% on election night, thereby flipping the seat Democratic. As a result, he outperformed Joe Biden in the concurrent presidential election, who defeated President Donald Trump by a margin of 0.3% in the state, but underperformed his polling average. Kelly became the first Democrat to win the Class 3 Senate seat since Carl Hayden won his last term in 1962.

Kelly was sworn in on December 2, 2020, marking the first time since 1953 that Democrats held both of Arizona’s Senate seats.

== Interim appointments ==
=== Appointees ===
- Jon Kyl, former U.S. senator, former U.S. Representative for Arizona's 4th congressional district and former Senate Minority Whip, resigned December 31, 2018
- Martha McSally, former U.S. representative for Arizona's 2nd congressional district, 2018 Republican nominee for U.S. Senate, assumed office January 3, 2019

=== Potential candidates not appointed ===
- Kirk Adams, incumbent chief of staff to incumbent governor of Arizona Doug Ducey and former speaker of the Arizona House of Representatives
- Barbara Barrett, Secretary of the Air Force and former United States Ambassador to Finland
- Jan Brewer, former governor of Arizona and former secretary of state of Arizona
- Paul Gosar, incumbent U.S. representative for Arizona's 4th congressional district
- Eileen Klein, former treasurer of Arizona and former chief of staff to former governor of Arizona Jan Brewer
- Cindy McCain, widow of former U.S. senator John McCain
- Meghan McCain, daughter of former U.S. senator John McCain
- Mick McGuire, incumbent adjutant general of the Arizona National Guard
- Karrin Taylor Robson, businesswoman and incumbent member of the Arizona Board of Regents
- Matt Salmon, former U.S. representative, 2002 gubernatorial nominee and former chairperson of the Arizona Republican Party
- David Schweikert, incumbent U.S. representative for Arizona's 6th congressional district
- John Shadegg, former U.S. representative for Arizona's 3rd congressional district
- Kelli Ward, former candidate for U.S. Senate in 2016 and 2018
- Grant Woods, former Republican Arizona Attorney General and former congressional chief of staff to former U.S. senator John McCain

== Republican primary ==
Incumbent McSally faced one challenger: Daniel McCarthy, a skincare company executive. McCarthy's independent wealth was expected to set up a bruising and expensive primary campaign; however, McSally won the primary in a landslide.

=== Candidates ===
==== Nominee ====
- Martha McSally, incumbent U.S. senator and former U.S. Representative for Arizona's 2nd congressional district

==== Eliminated in primary ====
- Sean Lyons (as a write-in candidate)
- Daniel McCarthy, skincare company executive

==== Withdrawn ====
- Craig Brittain, former revenge porn site operator
- PT Burton
- Mark Cavener
- Floyd Getchell
- Ann Griffin, former teacher
- Josue Larose, 2016 Republican presidential candidate and 2012 Republican candidate for Louisiana's 2nd congressional district

==== Declined ====
- Kirk Adams, incumbent chief of staff to incumbent governor of Arizona Doug Ducey and former Speaker of the Arizona House of Representatives
- Joe Arpaio, former Sheriff of Maricopa County and candidate for U.S. Senate in 2018 (ran for Maricopa County Sheriff)
- Doug Ducey, governor of Arizona
- Paul Gosar, U.S. representative for Arizona's 4th congressional district (ran for re-election)
- Jon Kyl, former two-time U.S. senator, former U.S. Representative for Arizona's 4th congressional district, and former Senate Minority Whip
- Blake Masters, president of the Thiel Foundation
- Curt Schilling, former Major League Baseball player and Blaze Media commentator
- Fife Symington, former governor of Arizona

=== Endorsements ===
Martha McSally

U.S. presidents

- George W. Bush, 43rd president of the United States
- Donald Trump, 45th president of the United States

State officials

- Doug Ducey, Governor of Arizona (2015–2023)

Individuals

- Buzz Aldrin, U.S. astronaut

Organizations

- Campaign for Working Families
- Huck PAC
- Maggie's List
- Republican Jewish Coalition
- Susan B. Anthony List

=== Primary results ===
Results by county: McSally—80–90% McSally—70–80% McSally—60–70%

Republican primary results
Party	Candidate	Votes	%
Republican	Martha McSally (incumbent)	551,119	75.2%
Republican	Daniel McCarthy	181,551	24.8%
Republican	Sean Lyons (write-in)	210	nil
Total votes		732,880	100.0%

== Democratic primary ==
=== Candidates ===
==== Nominee ====
- Mark Kelly, retired astronaut, engineer, retired U.S. Navy captain, husband of former U.S. Representative Gabby Giffords

==== Eliminated in primary ====
- Bo "Heir Archy" Garcia (as a write-in candidate)

==== Withdrew ====
- Mohammad Arif, businessman and perennial candidate (write-in) (switched to Democratic general election write-in candidacy)
- Sheila Bilyeu, Democratic candidate for the 2020 United States Senate election in Oklahoma
- Juan Angel Vasquez

==== Declined ====
- Ruben Gallego, incumbent U.S. representative for Arizona's 7th congressional district (ran for re-election, endorsed Kelly)
- Katie Hobbs, Secretary of State of Arizona
- Grant Woods, former Republican Arizona Attorney General and former congressional chief of staff to former U.S. senator John McCain

=== Endorsements ===
Mark Kelly (D)

U.S. presidents

- Barack Obama, 44th president of the United States

U.S. senators

- Kamala Harris, U.S. senator from California
- Amy Klobuchar, U.S. senator from Minnesota
- Kyrsten Sinema, U.S. senator from Arizona

U.S. representatives

- Ruben Gallego, U.S. representative (AZ-07)

Organizations

- 314 Action
- Brady Campaign
- Coalition to Stop Gun Violence
- Council for a Livable World
- Democratic Senatorial Campaign Committee
- End Citizens United
- Everytown for Gun Safety
- Feminist Majority PAC
- High School Democrats of America
- Human Rights Campaign
- Joint Action Committee for Political Affairs
- League of Conservation Voters
- NARAL Pro-Choice America
- National Organization for Women
- Planned Parenthood Action Fund
- Sierra Club
- Stonewall Democrats of Arizona
- Students for Gun Legislation
- VoteVets

=== Primary results ===
Democratic primary results
Party	Candidate	Votes	%
Democratic	Mark Kelly	665,620	99.9%
Democratic	Bo Garcia (write-in)	451	0.1%
Total votes		666,071	100.0%

== Libertarian primary ==
Neither one of the write-in candidates received enough votes to secure the Libertarian nomination in the general election.

=== Write-in candidates ===
==== Eliminated in primary ====
- Barry Hess, write-in Libertarian candidate in the 2018 United States Senate election in Arizona and Libertarian nominee in the 2014 Arizona gubernatorial election
- Alan White

=== Primary results ===
Libertarian primary results
Party	Candidate	Votes	%
Libertarian	Barry Hess (write-in)	329	76.5%
Libertarian	Alan White (write-in)	101	23.5%
Total votes		430	100.0%

== Other candidates ==
=== General election write-in candidates ===
==== Declared ====
Republican

- Edward Davida
- John Schiess
- Debbie Simmons
- Patrick "Pat" Thomas

Democratic

- Mohammed "Mike Obama" Arif
- Adam Chilton
- Perry Kapadia
- Buzz Stewart

Other

- Christopher Beckett, veteran (Independent)
- William "Will" Decker (Independent)
- Matthew "Doc" Dorchester (Libertarian)
- Nicholas N. Glenn, Navy veteran and aerospace engineer (Independent Republican)
- Mathew Haupt (Independent)
- Benjamin Rodriguez (Independent)
- Joshua Rodriguez (Unity)
- Frank Saenz (Independent)
- Jim Stevens (Independent)

==== Withdrawn ====
- Robert Kay (Independent)

== General election ==
=== Debates ===
- Complete video of debate, October 6, 2020

=== Predictions ===
Source	Ranking	As of
The Cook Political Report	Lean D (flip)	October 29, 2020
Inside Elections	Tilt D (flip)	October 28, 2020
Sabato's Crystal Ball	Lean D (flip)	November 2, 2020
Daily Kos	Lean D (flip)	October 30, 2020
Politico	Lean D (flip)	November 2, 2020
RCP	Tossup	October 23, 2020
DDHQ	Likely D (flip)	November 3, 2020
538	Likely D (flip)	November 2, 2020
Economist	Lean D (flip)	November 2, 2020

=== Post-primary endorsements ===
Martha McSally (R)

Federal officials

- Nikki Haley, former U.S. Ambassador to the UN (2017–2018) and former governor of South Carolina (2011–2017)

Newspapers

- Casa Grande Dispatch
Mark Kelly (D)

Federal officials

- Seth Moulton, U.S. representative from MA-06

Organizations

- Center for Biological Diversity
- Climate Hawks Vote
- Equality Arizona
- J Street
- MoveOn
- National Education Association
- Natural Resources Defense Council Action Fund

Unions

- United Auto Workers

Newspapers

- Arizona Daily Star

Individuals

- Kerry Washington, actress

=== Polling ===
==== Graphical summary ====
View source data.

==== Aggregate polls ====
Mark Kelly vs. Martha McSally
Source of poll aggregation	Dates administered	Dates updated	Mark Kelly	Martha McSally	Margin
270 to Win	November 2, 2020	November 3, 2020	49.8%	44.8%	Kelly +5.0
Real Clear Politics	November 1, 2020	November 3, 2020	50.5%	44.8%	Kelly +5.7
Average			50.2%	44.8%	Kelly +5.4

Polling

Poll source	Date(s) administered	Sample size (Note: Key: A – all adults RV – registered voters LV – likely voters V – unclear)	Margin of error	Martha McSally (R)	Mark Kelly (D)	Other / Undecided
Ipsos/Reuters	October 27 – November 2, 2020	610 (LV)	± 4.5%	44%	53%	4% (Note: "Some other candidate" with 3%; would not vote with 0%; "Undecided/Refused" with 1%)
Change Research/CNBC	October 29 – November 1, 2020	409 (LV)	± 4.9%	47%	51%	2% (Note: "Refused" and Undecided with 1%; Did not vote with 0%)
NBC News/Marist	October 29 – November 1, 2020	717 (LV)	± 4.5%	46%	52%	2% (Note: "Other" and Undecided with 1%)
Swayable	October 27 – November 1, 2020	333 (LV)	± 7.2%	45%	55%	–
Data for Progress	October 27 – November 1, 2020	1,195 (LV)	± 2.8%	46%	54%	0% (Note: "Other candidate or write-in" with 0%)
Emerson College	October 29–31, 2020	732 (LV)	± 3.6%	48%	50%	2% (Note: "Someone else" with 2%)
Morning Consult	October 22–31, 2020	1,059 (LV)	± 3%	44%	48%	–
Data Orbital	October 28–30, 2020	550 (LV)	± 4.2%	46%	47%	7% (Note: "Refused" with 4%; "Other" with 1%; Undecided with 2%)
Siena College/NYT Upshot	October 26–30, 2020	1,253 (LV)	± 3%	43%	50%	6% (Note: "Someone else" and would not vote with 0%; "Undecided/Refused" with 6%)
Grand Canyon Battleground Poll	October 25–30, 2020	910 (LV)	± 3.1%	43%	46%	11% (Note: "Some other" with 3.5%; "Other" with 7.5%; Undecided with 2%)
CNN/SSRS	October 23–30, 2020	892 (LV)	± 4.0%	45%	51%	5% (Note: "None of these" and Undecided with 2%; "Other" with 1%)
Pulse Opinion Research/Rasmussen Reports	October 27–29, 2020	800 (LV)	± 3.5%	43%	48%	9% (Note: "Some other candidate" with 4%; Undecided with 5%)
Gravis Marketing	October 26–28, 2020	704 (LV)	± 3.7%	45%	50%	6% (Note: Undecided with 6%)
Ipsos/Reutuers	October 21–27, 2020	714 (LV)	± 4.2%	44%	51%	5% (Note: "Some other candidate" with 2%; would not vote with 0%; Undecided with 3%)
Swayable	October 23–26, 2020	286 (LV)	± 7.4%	44%	56%	–
Justice Collaborative Project (D) (Note: The Justice Collaborative Project is an affiliate of the Tides Centre, a liberal fiscal sponsorship provider)	October 22–25, 2020	874 (LV)	± 3.1%	40%	50%	10% (Note: Undecided with 10%)
OH Predictive Insights	October 22–25, 2020	716 (LV)	± 3.7%	45%	50%	4% (Note: "Refused" with 1%; Undecided with 3%)
Univision/University of Houston/Latino Decisions/Latino; Decisions/North Star Opinion Research	October 17–25, 2020	725 (RV)	± 3.6%	39%	51%	10% (Note: "Someone else" and would not vote with 2%; Undecided with 6%)
Patinkin Research Strategies (D)	October 21–24, 2020	729 (LV)	± 3.6%	46%	53%	2% (Note: Undecided with 2%)
Y2 Analytics	October 15–24, 2020	700 (LV)	± 3.7%	47%	51%	–
Susquehanna Polling & Research Inc. (R) (Note: The American Greatness PAC, this poll's sponsor, is pro-Trump.)	October 19–22, 2020	500 (LV)	± 4.4%	50%	47%	4% (Note: "Other" and "Refused" with 0%; Undecided with 3%)
Ipsos/Reuters	October 14–21, 2020	658 (LV)	± 4.4%	43%	51%	5% (Note: "Some other candidate" with 3%; would not vote with 0%; "Undecided/Refused" with 2%)
Morning Consult	October 11–20, 2020	1,066 (LV)	± 3%	44%	48%	–
Pulse Opinion Research/Rasmussen Reports	October 18–19, 2020	800 (LV)	± 3.5%	44%	46%	10% (Note: "Some other candidate" and Undecided with 5%)
Change Research/CNBC	October 16–19, 2020	232 (LV) (Note: Additional data sourced from FiveThirtyEight)	–	43%	54%	–
RMG Research	October 14–19, 2020	800 (LV)	± 3.5%	39% (Note: Standard VI response)	49%	15% (Note: "Some other candidate" with 6%; Undecided with 9%)
RMG Research	October 14–19, 2020	800 (LV)	± 3.5%	37% (Note: Results generated with high Democratic turnout model)	49%	15%
RMG Research	October 14–19, 2020	800 (LV)	± 3.5%	40% (Note: Results generated with high Republican turnout model)	44%	15%
Data Orbital	October 16–18, 2020	550 (LV)	± 4.2%	42%	48%	10% (Note: "Refused" with 3%; "Other" with 2%; Undecided with 5%)
YouGov/CBS	October 13–16, 2020	1,074 (LV)	± 4.1%	41%	52%	7% (Note: "Someone else" with 2%; Undecided with 5%)
Ipsos/Reuters	October 7–14, 2020	667 (LV)	± 4.3%	41%	52%	8% (Note: "Some other candidate" and Undecided with 4%; would not vote with 0%)
Monmouth University	October 9–13, 2020	502 (RV)	± 4.4%	42%	52%	5% (Note: "No one" with 1%; "Other" with 0%; Undecided with 4%)
Monmouth University	October 9–13, 2020	502 (LV) (Note: With a likely voter turnout model featuring higher turnout than in the 2016 presidential election)	± 4.4%	42%	52%	–
Monmouth University	October 9–13, 2020	502 (LV) (Note: With a likely voter turnout model featuring lower turnout than in the 2016 presidential election)	± 4.4%	45%	51%	–
Morning Consult	October 2–11, 2020	1,144 (LV)	± 2.9%	41%	49%	–
Trafalgar Group	October 6–9, 2020	1,045 (LV)	± 3.0%	45%	47%	7% (Note: "Other" with 3%; Undecided with 4%)
OH Predictive Insights	October 4–8, 2020	608 (LV)	± 4.0%	45%	50%	6% (Note: "Refused" with 0%; Undecided with 5%)
Ipsos/Reuters	September 29 – October 7, 2020	663 (LV)	± 4.3%	41%	51%	8% (Note: "Some other candidate" with 4%; would not vote with 0%; "Undecided/Prefer not to answer" with 4%)
Latino Decisions (D) (Note: This poll's sponsor, Democrats for Education Reform, exclusively supports Democratic candidates.)	September 28 – October 6, 2020	600 (LV)	± 4%	42%	47%	7% (Note: Undecided with 7%)
Basswood Research (R) (Note: Poll sponsored by the American Action Network, a conservative advocacy group.)	October 3–5, 2020	800 (LV)	± 3.5%	49%	47%	4% (Note: Undecided with 4%)
Data Orbital	October 3–5, 2020	550 (LV)	± 4.2%	44%	49%	7% (Note: "Refused" with 2%; "Other" with 1%; Undecided with 4%)
HighGround Inc.	September 28 – October 5, 2020	400 (LV)	± 4.9%	44%	50%	7% (Note: "Some other candidate" with 1%; "Undecided/Refused" with 6%)
Change Research/CNBC	October 2–4, 2020	296 (LV)	–	43%	51%	6% (Note: Would not vote and Undecided with 3%)
Siena College/NYT Upshot	October 1–3, 2020	655 (LV)	± 4.2%	39%	50%	11% (Note: Would not vote with 1%; "Someone else" with 0%; "Undecided/Refused" with 10%)
Patinkin Research Strategies/Arizona Research Consortium (D)	October 1–3, 2020	604 (LV)	± 3.8%	45%	50%	5% (Note: Undecided with 5%)
Targoz Market Research	September 23 – October 2, 2020	1,045 (LV)	± nil	41%	51%	8%
Morning Consult	September 22 – October 1, 2020	1,048 (LV)	± 3%	38% (Note: Overlapping sample with the previous Morning Consult poll, but more information available regarding sample size)	51%	10% (Note: "Someone else" with 4%; Undecided with 6%)
Suffolk University	September 26–30, 2020	500 (LV)	± 4.4%	40%	49%	11% (Note: "Other" and "Refused" with 2%; Undecided with 7%)
Susquehanna Polling & Research Inc. (R)	September 25–28, 2020	500 (LV)	± 4.3%	45%	48%	–
Data for Progress (D)	September 23–28, 2020	808 (LV)	± 3.4%	42%	51%	7%
Morning Consult	September 19–28, 2020	~1,000 (LV)	± 3%	36%	53%	10% (Note: "Someone else" and Undecided with 5%)
Data For Progress (Note: Poll sponsored by the Defend Students Action Fund.)	September 15–22, 2020	481 (LV)	± 4.4%	38%	47%	15% (Note: Undecided with 15%)
Change Research/CNBC	September 18–20, 2020	262 (LV)	–	43%	51%	6% (Note: Would not vote with 1%; Undecided with 5%)
ABC News/Washington Post	September 15–20, 2020	579 (LV)	± 4.5%	48%	49%	3% (Note: "Neither" with 2%; would not vote with 0%; "other" with no voters; Undecided with 1%)
Morning Consult	September 11–20, 2020	907 (LV)	± 3% (Note: Overlapping sample with the previous and subsequent Morning Consult polls, but more information available regarding sample size)	40%	49%	–
Hart Research Associates (D) (Note: Poll sponsored by the Human Rights Campaign which has endorsed Biden prior to this poll's sampling period.)	September 17–19, 2020	400 (LV)	± 4.9%	43%	55%	–
Ipsos/Reuters	September 11–17, 2020	565 (LV)	± 4.7%	41%	50%	8% (Note: "Not sure/prefer not to answer" with 4%; "Some other candidate" with 3%; would not vote with 1%)
Morning Consult	September 8–17, 2020	900 (LV)	± (2% – 4%)	41%	48%	–
Fabrizio, Lee & Associates (R) (Note: Poll sponsored by the McSally campaign)	September 14–16, 2020	800 (LV)	± 3.5%	46%	48%	6%
Redfield & Wilton Strategies	September 12–16, 2020	855 (LV)	± 3.4%	35%	53%	13% (Note: "Another Third Party/Write-in" with 2%; Undecided with 11%)
Monmouth University	September 11–15, 2020	420 (RV)	± 4.8%	44%	50%	5%
Monmouth University	September 11–15, 2020	420 (LV)	± 4.8%	46%	50%	4% (Note: "Other" with 0%; Undecided with 4%)
Monmouth University	September 11–15, 2020	420 (LV)	± 4.8%	48%	49%	4%
Siena College/NYT Upshot	September 10–15, 2020	653 (LV)	± 4.1%	42%	50%	8% (Note: Would not vote with 1%; "Someone else" with 0%; "Undecided/Refused" with 7%)
Morning Consult	September 5–14, 2020	~1,000 (LV)	± 3%	38%	50%	13% (Note: "Someone else" with 4%; Undecided with 9%)
Patinkin Research Strategies/Arizona Research Consortium (D)	September 10–13, 2020	679 (LV)	± 3.8%	45%	50%	5%
Kaiser Family Foundation/Cook Political Report	August 29 – September 13, 2020	1,298 (RV)	± 3.0%	36%	44%	20% (Note: "Neither/Another Party" with 4%; "Undecided/Don't know/Refused" with 16%)
Gravis Marketing	September 10–11, 2020	684 (LV)	± 3.8%	43%	48%	9% (Note: Undecided with 9%)
YouGov/CBS	September 9–11, 2020	1,106 (LV)	± 3.9%	42%	49%	9% (Note: "Someone else" with 3%; Undecided with 6%)
OH Predictive Insights	September 8–10, 2020	600 (LV)	± 4%	42%	52%	6% (Note: "Refused" with 1%; Undecided with 6%)
Benenson Strategy Group/GS Strategy Group (Note: Poll sponsored by AARP.)	August 28 – September 8, 2020	1,600 (LV)	± 2.5%	45%	48%	7% (Note: "Someone else" with 0%; Undecided with 7%)
Change Research/CNBC	September 4–6, 2020	470 (LV)	± 4.6%	45%	51%	4% (Note: Would not vote with 1%; Undecided with 3%)
Redfield & Wilton Strategies	August 30 – September 4, 2020	830 (LV)	± 3.4%	38%	53%	8% (Note: "Another Third Party/Write-in" with 1%; Undecided with 7%)
Morning Consult	August 26 – September 4, 2020	~1,000 (LV)	± 3%	39%	50%	11% (Note: "Someone else" with 4%; Undecided with 7%)
FOX News	August 29 – September 1, 2020	772 (LV)	± 3.5%	39%	56%	5% (Note: "Other" and would not vote with 1%; Undecided with 3%)
FOX News	August 29 – September 1, 2020	853 (RV)	± 3.0%	38%	55%	6% (Note: "Other" and would not vote with 1%; Undecided with 4%)
Basswood Research (R)	August 29–31, 2020	800 (LV)	± 3.5%	48%	48%	4%
Morning Consult	August 16–25, 2020	~1,000 (LV)	± 3%	35%	53%	13%
Redfield and Wilton Strategies	August 16–18, 2020	856 (LV)	± 3.4%	34%	53%	12% (Note: "Third party/write-in" with 1%; Undecided with 11%)
Morning Consult	August 6–15, 2020	~1,000 (LV)	± 3%	43%	46%	11%
Emerson College	August 8–10, 2020	661 (LV)	± 3.8%	41%	52%	7%
Change Research/CNBC	August 7–9, 2020	428 (LV)	± 4.6%	43%	49%	8% (Note: Would not vote with 2%; Undecided with 6%)
Morning Consult	July 27 – August 5, 2020	~1,000 (LV)	± 3%	38%	49%	13% (Note: "Someone else" with 5%; Undecided with 8%)
OH Predictive Insights	August 3–4, 2020	603 (LV)	± 4.0%	43%	48%	9% (Note: "Refused" with 1%; Undecided with 8%)
OnMessage Inc. (R) (Note: Heritage Action is the sister organization of the Heritage Foundation, which exclusively endorses Republican candidates)	August 2–4, 2020	400 (LV)	± 4.9%	48%	48%	4%
Data for Progress	July 24 – August 2, 2020	1,215 (LV)	± 3.2%	40%	50%	10% (Note: "No one" with 10%)
Change Research/CNBC	July 24–26, 2020	365 (LV)	± 4.8%	45%	47%	8%
Morning Consult	July 17–26, 2020	908 (LV)	± 3.0%	36%	52%	13%
CNN/SSRS	July 18–24, 2020	873 (RV)	± 3.8%	43%	50%	7% (Note: "None of the above/neither" with 3%; "other" with 0%; Undecided with 4%)
Redfield & Wilton Strategies	July 19–23, 2020	858 (LV)	± 3.2%	35%	53%	13% (Note: "Third party/write-in" with 3%; Undecided with 10%)
Morning Consult	July 14–23, 2020	~1,000 (LV)	± 3%	39%	49%	12% (Note: "Someone else" with 4%; Undecided with 8%)
Public Policy Polling	July 21–22, 2020	816 (V)	± 3.2%	42%	51%	7%
NBC News/Marist	July 14–22, 2020	826 (RV)	± 4.1%	41%	53%	6% (Note: "Other" with 1%; Undecided with 5%)
Spry Strategies (R) (Note: This poll's sponsor is the American Principles Project, a 501 that supports the Republican Party.)	July 11–16, 2020	700 (LV)	± 3.7%	41%	48%	11% (Note: "Another candidate" with 6%; Undecided with 5%)
Change Research/CNBC	July 10–12, 2020	345 (LV)	± 4.6%	45%	52%	3% (Note: Undecided with 2%; would not vote with 1%)
CBS News/YouGov	July 7–10, 2020	1,087 (LV)	± 3.8%	42%	46%	12% (Note: Undecided with 9%; "Someone else" with 3%; would not vote with 0%)
OH Predictive Insights	July 6–7, 2020	600 (LV)	± 4.0%	43%	52%	6% (Note: Undecided with 5%; "Refused" with 1%)
Data Orbital	June 27–29, 2020	600 (LV)	± 4.0%	43%	50%	7% (Note: Undecided with 5.2%; "Other" with 1.8%; "refused" with 0.4%)
Gravis Marketing (R) (Note: Polling was sponsored by OANN.)	June 27, 2020	527 (LV)	± 4.3%	46%	42%	12% (Note: Undecided with 12%)
Change Research/CNBC	June 26–28, 2020	311 (LV)	± 5.8%	44%	53%	3% (Note: Undecided with 3%; "Would not vote" with 0%)
Global Strategy Group (D)	June 19–24, 2020	800 (LV)	± 3.5%	42%	49%	9%
Change Research (D) (Note: This poll's sponsor, 314 Action, had endorsed Kelly prior to the sampling period)	June 20–23, 2020	946 (LV)	± 3.2%	42%	50%	8%
Redfield & Wilton Strategies	June 14–17, 2020	865 (LV)	± 3.3%	34%	49%	17% (Note: Undecided with 14%; "Third party/write-in" with 3%)
NYT Upshot/Siena College	June 8–16, 2020	650 (RV)	± 4.3%	38%	47%	16% (Note: Undecided with 14%; "Another candidate" and would not vote with 1%)
Civiqs/Daily Kos	June 13–15, 2020	1,368 (RV)	± 2.9%	42%	51%	7% (Note: "Someone else" with 4%; unsure with 3%)
FOX News	May 30 – June 2, 2020	1,002 (RV)	± 3.9%	37%	50%	13% (Note: Undecided with 8%; "Other" with 3%; would not vote with 2%)
HighGround Public Affairs	May 18–22, 2020	400 (LV)	± 4.9%	41%	51%	8% (Note: "Undecided/refused" with 5.8%; "some other candidate" with 1.8%)
OH Predictive Insights	May 9–11, 2020	600 (LV)	± 4.0%	38%	51%	10%
OH Predictive Insights	April 7–8, 2020	600 (LV)	± 4.0%	42%	51%	8% (Note: "Refused" with 1%; Undecided with 7%)
NBC News/Marist	March 10–15, 2020	2,523 (RV)	± 2.7%	45%	48%	7%
Monmouth University	March 11–14, 2020	847 (RV)	± 3.4%	44%	50%	6%
Univision/Arizona State University	March 6–11, 2020	1,036 (RV)	± 3.0%	36%	48%	16%
OH Predictive Insights	March 3–4, 2020	600 (LV)	± 4.0%	42%	49%	9%
Public Policy Polling	March 2–3, 2020	666 (V)	± 3.8%	42%	47%	12%
HighGround Public Affairs	February 7–9, 2020	400 (LV)	± 4.9%	39%	46%	15%
Fabrizio, Lee & Associates (R)	January 22–24, 2020	1,000 (LV)	± 3.1%	47%	45%	8%
Public Policy Polling	January 2–4, 2020	760 (V)	± 3.6%	42%	46%	12%
OH Predictive Insights	December 3–4, 2019	628 (LV)	± 3.9%	44%	47%	9% (Note: "Refused" with 0%; Undecided with 9%)
Emerson College	October 25–28, 2019	904 (RV)	± 3.2%	45%	46%	9%
Change Research (D)	September 27–28, 2019	856 (RV)	± 3.3%	45%	47%	8%
Bendixen & Amandi International	September 9–12, 2019	520 (RV)	± 4.3%	42%	42%	16%
OH Predictive Insights	August 13–14, 2019	600 (LV)	± 4.0%	41%	46%	13% (Note: "Refused" with 0%; Undecided with 13%)
Fabrizio Ward/AARP	July 29–31, 2019	600 (LV)	± 4.0%	45%	44%	11% (Note: Undecided with 9%; "Would not vote/would not vote for US Senate" with 2%)
OH Predictive Insights	May 1–2, 2019	600 (LV)	± 4.0%	45%	44%	11% (Note: "Refused" with 1%; Undecided with 10%)
OH Predictive Insights	February 12–13, 2019	600 (LV)	± 4.0%	46%	44%	10%

Hypothetical polling

with Daniel McCarthy and Mark Kelly

Poll source	Date(s) administered	Sample size	Margin of error	Daniel McCarthy (R)	Mark Kelly (D)	Other / Undecided
Change Research	June 20–23, 2020	946 (LV)	± 3.2%	44%	50%	6%

with Ruben Gallego

Poll source	Date(s) administered	Sample size	Margin of error	Martha McSally (R)	Ruben Gallego (D)	Other / Undecided
OH Predictive Insights	February 12–13, 2019	600 (LV)	± 4.0%	49%	41%	10%

on whether McSally deserves to be re-elected

Poll source	Date(s) administered	Sample size	Margin of error	Yes	No	Other / Undecided
Fabrizio Ward/AARP	July 29–31, 2019	600 (LV)	± 4.0%	39%	45%	16% (Note: Undecided with 14%, refused with 2%)
Public Policy Polling	January 24–25, 2019	682 (V)	–	40%	54%	6%

with generic Republican and generic Democrat

Poll source	Date(s) administered	Sample size	Margin of error	Generic Republican	Generic Democrat	Other / Undecided
OH Predictive Insights	October 4–8, 2020	608 (LV)	± 4.0%	45%	45%	10% (Note: "Other" with 6%; "Refused" with 0%; Undecided with 4%)
Targoz Market Research/PollSmart	September 23 – October 2, 2020	1,045 (LV)	± 3.0%	44%	42%	14% (Note: "Another candidate" with 5%; Undecided with 9%)
Data For Progress (Note: Poll sponsored by the Defend Students Action Fund.)	September 15–22, 2020	481 (LV)	± 4.4%	45%	42%	15%
Siena College/NYT Upshot	September 10–15, 2020	653 (LV)	± 4.1%	44%	50%	6% (Note: "Undecided/Refused" with 6%)
Emerson College	August 8–10, 2020	661 (LV)	± 3.8%	41%	46%	13% (Note: Undecided with 13%)
OnMessage Inc. (R)	August 2–4, 2020	400 (LV)	± 4.9%	43%	43%	14% (Note: Undecided with 14%)
Climate Nexus	Feb 11–15, 2020	539 (RV)	± 4.3%	44%	44%	12% (Note: "Neither candidate or other candidate" with 12%)
Fabrizio, Lee & Associates (R)	Jan 22–24, 2020	1,000 (LV)	± 3.1%	49%	45%	6% (Note: "Undecided/Don't know/Refused" with 6%)
OH Predictive Insights	December 3–4, 2019	628 (LV)	± 3.9%	44%	44%	11% (Note: "Other" with 5%; "Refused" with 0%; Undecided with 6%)
Fabrizio Ward/AARP	July 29–31, 2019	600 (LV)	± 4.0%	42%	43%	14% (Note: "Undecided/Don't know/Refused" with 14%)
OH Predictive Insights	February 12–13, 2019	600 (LV)	± 4.0%	44%	39%	17% (Note: "Other" with 10%; "Refused" with 0%; Undecided with 7%)

=== Results ===
2020 United States Senate Special election in Arizona
Party	Candidate	Votes	%	±%
Democratic	Mark Kelly	1,716,467	51.16%	+10.41%
Republican	Martha McSally (incumbent)	1,637,661	48.81%	−4.90%
Write-in		1,189	0.03%	-0.03%
Total votes		3,355,317	100.0%	
Democratic gain from Republican				

==== By county ====
By county

County	Mark Kelly Democratic		Martha McSally Republican		Write-in		Margin		Total votes
County	#	%	#	%	#	%	#	%	Total votes
Apache	24,050	68.47	11,052	31.47	22	0.06	12,998	37.01	35,124
Cochise	24,843	41.35	35,214	58.61	29	0.05	-10,371	-17.26	60,086
Coconino	45,561	62.54	27,255	37.41	29	0.04	18,306	25.13	72,845
Gila	9,648	35.02	17,889	64.94	11	0.04	-8,241	-29.91	27,548
Graham	4,506	30.42	10,303	69.55	4	0.03	-5,797	-39.13	14,813
Greenlee	1,403	38.65	2,225	61.29	2	0.06	-822	-22.66	3,630
La Paz	2,492	34.00	4,835	65.97	2	0.03	-2,343	-31.97	7,329
Maricopa	1,064,396	51.94	984,203	48.03	698	0.03	80,193	3.91	2,049,297
Mohave	27,414	26.66	75,359	73.29	49	0.05	-47,945	-46.63	102,822
Navajo	24,396	47.49	26,952	52.47	21	0.04	-2,556	-4.98	51,369
Pima	309,142	59.84	207,317	40.13	152	0.03	101,825	19.71	516,611
Pinal	79,114	43.18	104,048	56.78	76	0.04	-24,934	-13.61	183,238
Santa Cruz	13,689	70.65	5,685	29.34	2	0.01	8,004	41.31	19,376
Yavapai	51,852	36.49	90,180	63.47	57	0.04	-38,328	-26.97	142,089
Yuma	33,961	49.13	35,144	50.84	15	0.02	-1,183	-1.71	69,120
Totals	1,716,467	51.16	1,637,661	48.81	1,189	0.03	78,826	2.35	3,355,317

Counties that flipped from Republican to Democratic

- Maricopa (largest municipality: Phoenix)

==== By congressional district ====
Kelly won five of nine congressional districts.

District	McSally	Kelly	Representative
1st	48%	52%	Tom O'Halleran
2nd	44%	56%	Ann Kirkpatrick
3rd	35%	65%	Raúl Grijalva
4th	67%	33%	Paul Gosar
5th	56%	44%	Andy Biggs
6th	52%	48%	David Schweikert
7th	24%	76%	Ruben Gallego
8th	57%	43%	Debbie Lesko
9th	38%	62%	Greg Stanton

== See also ==
- 2020 Arizona elections

== Notes ==
Partisan clients
