= 2022 United States Senate election in Arizona =

- November 8, 2022
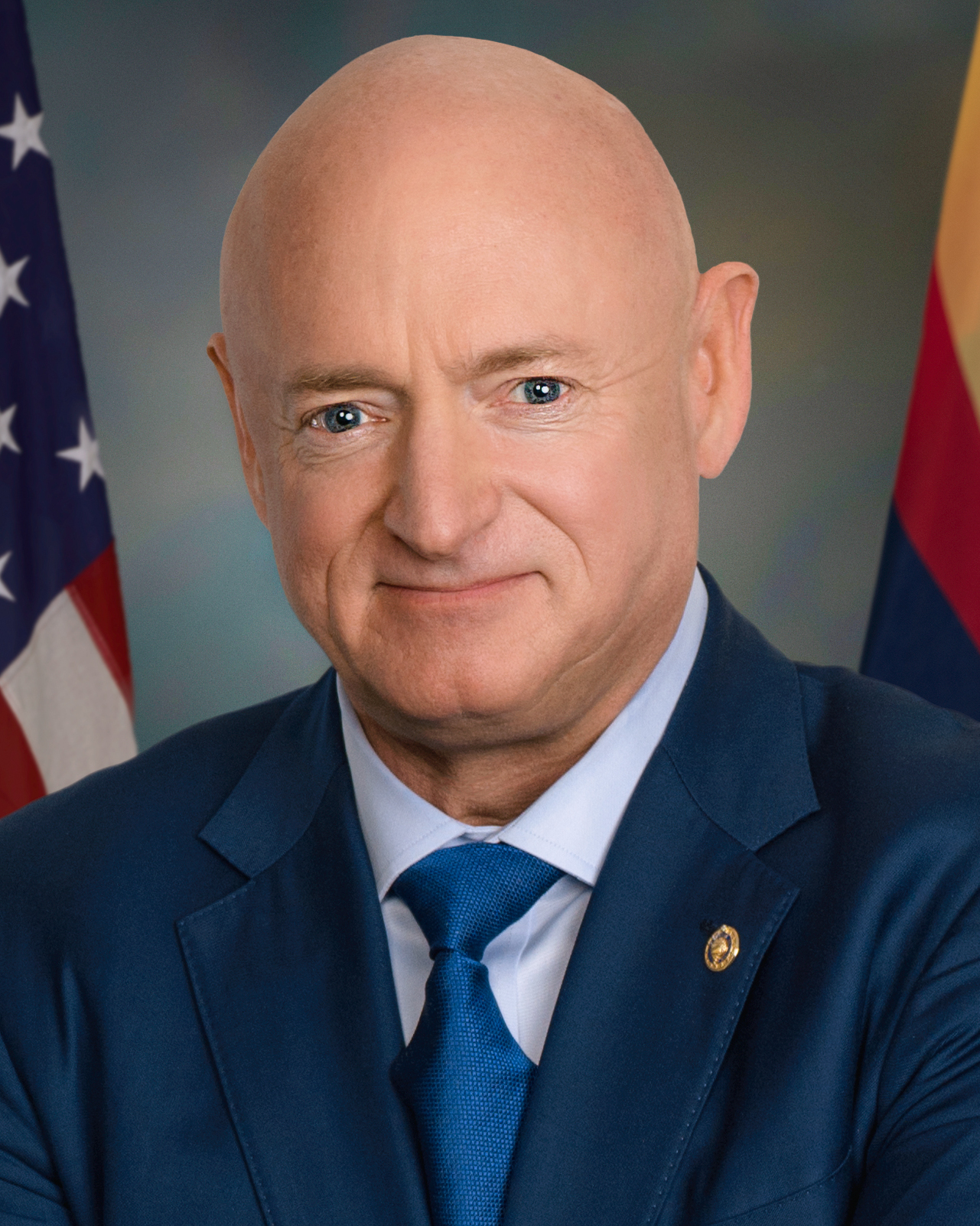

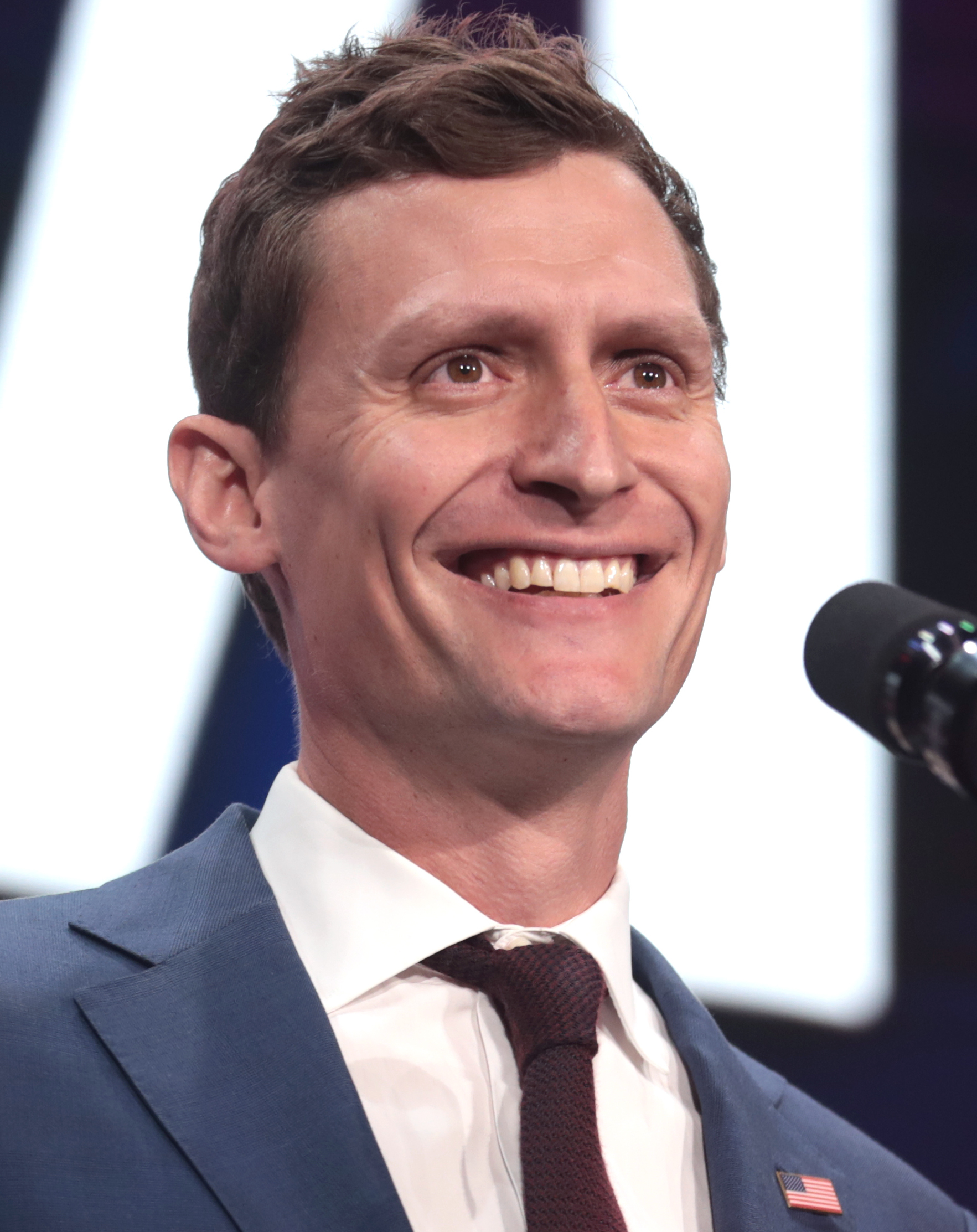
Nominee	Mark Kelly	Blake Masters
Party	Democratic	Republican
Popular vote	1,322,027	1,196,308
Percentage	51.39%	46.51%
- Kelly: 40–50% 50–60% 60–70% 70–80% 80–90% >90% Masters: 40–50% 50–60% 60–70% 70–80% 80–90% >90% Tie: 40–50% No votes
U.S. senator before election
Mark Kelly
Democratic
Elected U.S. senator
Mark Kelly
Democratic

The 2022 United States Senate election in Arizona was held on November 8, 2022, to elect a member of the United States Senate to represent the state of Arizona. Democratic incumbent Mark Kelly won re-election to a second term, defeating Republican venture capitalist Blake Masters.

Primaries in Arizona took place on August 2, 2022. Kelly won renomination without opposition, while Masters won the Republican nomination against a large field of candidates. Although Arizona typically leans Republican, Kelly led Masters by low single digits in aggregate polling. Kelly held a significant fundraising advantage until many Republican-aligned groups began spending to assist Masters in the final weeks of the campaign. On November 1, Libertarian nominee Marc Victor dropped out of the race and endorsed Masters.

Kelly won re-election on his first full term in office, defeating Masters by a comfortable margin of about 5 points. This was the first time Democrats won a full term to this seat since 1962. The 2022 race was competitive and seen as crucial to determining party control of the U.S. Senate; with Kelly's victory in Arizona and a Democratic victory in Nevada, in addition to a Democratic gain in Pennsylvania, it was projected on November 12 that the Democratic caucus would retain control of the Senate in the 118th United States Congress. Masters conceded the race to Kelly on November 15, 2022.

== Democratic primary ==
=== Candidates ===
==== Nominee ====
- Mark Kelly, incumbent U.S. senator

=== Endorsements ===
Mark Kelly

U.S. executive branch officials

- Miles Taylor, former chief of staff to the U.S. secretary of Homeland Security (2019) (Forward)
- Christine Todd Whitman, former administrator of the Environmental Protection Agency (2001–2003) and former governor of New Jersey (1994–2001) (Forward)

U.S. attorneys

- Paul K. Charlton, former United States attorney for the District of Arizona (2001–2007) (Republican)

Local officials

- John Giles, mayor of Mesa (2014–2025) (Republican)

Organizations

- 314 Action
- End Citizens United
- Feminist Majority PAC
- Forward Party
- Jewish Dems
- March On
- NARAL Pro-Choice America
- Planned Parenthood Action Fund
- Population Connection Action Fund
- Renew America Movement
- VoteVets.org

=== Results ===
Democratic primary results
Party	Candidate	Votes	%
Democratic	Mark Kelly (incumbent)	589,400	100.0%
Total votes		589,400	100.0%

== Republican primary ==
=== Candidates ===
==== Nominee ====
- Blake Masters, former president of the Thiel Foundation and former chief operating officer of Thiel Capital

==== Eliminated in primary ====
- Mark Brnovich, Arizona attorney general
- Jim Lamon, solar power businessman
- Mick McGuire, retired U.S. Air Force major general and former adjutant general of the Arizona National Guard
- Justin Olson, member of the Arizona Corporation Commission

==== Did not file ====
- Craig Brittain
- Robert Paveza, software engineer

==== Declined ====
- Kirk Adams, former chief of staff to Governor Doug Ducey and former speaker of the Arizona House of Representatives
- Andy Biggs, U.S. representative for Arizona's 5th congressional district
- Doug Ducey, outgoing governor of Arizona
- Kari Lake, former KSAZ-TV news anchor (ran for governor)
- Jack McCain, veteran and son of former U.S. Senator John McCain
- Martha McSally, former U.S. senator from Arizona (2019–2020)
- Kelli Ward, chair of the Arizona Republican Party, former state senator, and candidate for the U.S. Senate in 2016 and 2018
- Kimberly Yee, state treasurer of Arizona (ran for re-election)

=== Endorsements ===
Mark Brnovich

Individuals

- Sean Hannity, talk show host and conservative political commentator
- Mark Levin, lawyer and host of Life, Liberty & Levin

Newspapers

- Casa Grande Dispatch
Jim Lamon

U.S. executive branch officials

- Jeff DeWit, chief financial officer of NASA (2018–2020) and state treasurer of Arizona (2015–2018)
- Thomas Homan, acting director of the U.S. Immigration and Customs Enforcement (2017–2018)
- Mark A. Morgan, acting commissioner of U.S. Customs and Border Protection (2019–2021) and chief of the U.S. Border Patrol (2016–2017)
- Keith Schiller, director of Oval Office Operations (2017)
- Matthew Whitaker, acting U.S. attorney general (2018–2019)
- Chad Wolf, acting U.S. secretary of Homeland Security (2019–2021)

Statewide officials

- Ken Bennett, secretary of state of Arizona (2009–2015)

State legislators

- Judy Burges, state representative from the 12th district (2021–2023) and state senator from the 22nd district (2012–2019)
- Frank Carroll, state representative from the 22nd district (2019–2023)
- David Livingston, state senator (2019–2023) and state representative (2013–2019), (2023-Present) from the 22nd district
- Kelly Townsend, state senator (2021–2023) and state representative (2013–2021) from the 16th district

Individuals

- Brandon Judd, president of the National Border Patrol Council

Organizations

- Arizona Conference of Police and Sheriffs
- Arizona Police Association (APA)
- Conservative Political Action Coalition (CPAC)
- Glendale Law Enforcement Association
- Grassroot Grandmas
- National Association of Police Organizations
- National Border Patrol Council

Former

- Richard Grenell, U.S. ambassador to Germany (2018–2020) (switched endorsement to Blake Masters)
Blake Masters

U.S. executive branch officials

- Richard Grenell, U.S. ambassador to Germany (2018–2020)
- David M. McIntosh, director of the Domestic Policy Council (1987–1988) and U.S. representative from Indiana's 2nd congressional district (1995–2001)
- Robert C. O'Brien, U.S. national security advisor (2019–2021)
- Kash Patel, chief of staff to the acting U.S. secretary of defense
- Donald Trump, 45th president of the United States (2017–2021)

U.S. senators

- Josh Hawley, Missouri (2019–present)

U.S. representatives

- Jim Banks, Indiana's 3rd congressional district (2017–2025)
- Madison Cawthorn, North Carolina's 11th congressional district (2021–2023)
- Matt Gaetz, Florida's 1st congressional district (2017–2024)
- Marjorie Taylor Greene, Georgia's 14th congressional district (2021–2026)

Individuals

- Tucker Carlson, host of Tucker Carlson Tonight and conservative political commentator
- Peter Thiel, venture capitalist
- Susie Wiles, political consultant and advisor to Donald Trump

Organizations

- Club for Growth
- Republicans for National Renewal
- Tea Party Express

Rejected by candidate

- Andrew Anglin, neo-Nazi and founder of The Daily Stormer
Justin Olson

Organizations

- Stand for Health Freedom

=== Polling ===
Aggregate polls

Source of poll aggregation	Dates administered	Dates updated	Mark Brnovich	Jim Lamon	Blake Masters	Michael McGuire	Justin Olson	Undecided (Note: Calculated by taking the difference of 100% and all other candidates combined.)	Margin
Real Clear Politics	July 27 – August 1, 2022	August 2, 2022	14.5%	22.0%	37.0%	8.5%	3.3%	17.7%	Masters +15.0

View source data.

Poll source	Date(s) administered	Sample size (Note: Key: A – all adults RV – registered voters LV – likely voters V – unclear)	Margin of error	Mark Brnovich	Jim Lamon	Blake Masters	Michael McGuire	Justin Olson	Other	Undecided
The Trafalgar Group (R)	July 30 – August 1, 2022	1,064 (LV)	± 2.9%	16%	24%	39%	7%	4%	–	9%
Emerson College	July 28–30, 2022	600 (LV)	± 3.9%	14%	22%	40%	12%	3%	–	9%
Rasmussen Reports	July 27–28, 2022	710 (LV)	± 4.0%	16%	19%	31%	10%	3%	6%	15%
OH Predictive Insights	July 27, 2022	502 (LV)	± 4.4%	12%	21%	36%	5%	3%	–	22%
Battleground Connect (R)	July 26–27, 2022	800 (LV)	± 3.7%	16%	30%	28%	8%	6%	–	12%
The Trafalgar Group (R)	July 25–27, 2022	1,071 (LV)	± 2.9%	15%	27%	35%	8%	6%	–	10%
Battleground Connect (R)	July 17–18, 2022	800 (LV)	± 3.7%	16%	33%	28%	7%	2%	–	14%
Cygnal (R)	July 12–13, 2022	419 (LV)	± 4.8%	18%	20%	30%	5%	2%	–	25%
Battleground Connect (R)	July 7–9, 2022	800 (LV)	± 3.7%	16%	29%	27%	4%	–	–	24%
HighGround Public Affairs (R)	July 2–7, 2022	400 (LV)	± 4.9%	13%	14%	23%	5%	2%	–	44%
Alloy Analytics (R)/J.L. Partners	July 5–6, 2022	500 (LV)	± 4.4%	10%	14%	26%	5%	0%	–	45%
OH Predictive Insights	June 30 – July 2, 2022	515 (LV)	± 4.3%	14%	18%	25%	6%	2%	–	35%
Public Policy Polling (D)	June 28, 2022	595 (LV)	± 4.0%	15%	10%	29%	5%	–	–	41%
The Trafalgar Group (R)	June 7–9, 2022	1,077 (LV)	± 2.9%	24%	17%	29%	4%	4%	–	22%
Data Orbital (R)	June 1–3, 2022	550 (LV)	± 4.3%	18%	20%	15%	–	–	12%	36%
Fabrizio Lee (R) (Note: This poll was sponsored by Saving Arizona, which supports Blake Masters.)	May 17–18, 2022	800 (LV)	± 3.5%	18%	18%	22%	7%	2%	–	34%
Cygnal (R) (Note: This poll was sponsored by Kari Lake's campaign for governor.)	April 28–30, 2022	– (LV)	–	19%	20%	19%	7%	2%	–	33%
The Trafalgar Group (R)	April 25–28, 2022	1,064 (LV)	± 3.0%	24%	25%	19%	8%	3%	–	21%
McLaughlin & Associates (R) (Note: This poll was sponsored by Lamon's campaign.)	April 21–24, 2022	– (LV)	–	22%	25%	16%	6%	–	–	31%
OH Predictive Insights	April 4–5, 2022	500 (LV)	± 4.4%	21%	16%	9%	6%	3%	–	45%
Data Orbital (R)	April 1–3, 2022	550 (LV)	± 4.3%	20%	26%	10%	7%	4%	–	33%
HighGround Public Affairs (R)	March 26–27, 2022	264 (LV)	± 6.0%	11%	10%	6%	4%	–	8%	61%
Fabrizio Lee (R)	March 13–14, 2022	800 (LV)	± 3.5%	14%	14%	16%	3%	1%	–	52%
Alloy Analytics (R)/J.L. Partners	March 9–12, 2022	433 (LV)	± 4.7%	20%	15%	15%	3%	1%	–	45%
Data Orbital (R)	March 2022	– (LV)	–	23%	17%	14%	4%	5%	–	37%
Data Orbital (R)	February 11–13, 2022	300 (LV)	± 5.7%	22%	17%	15%	5%	5%	–	37%
co/efficient (R)	February 6–8, 2022	755 (LV)	± 3.6%	17%	13%	12%	3%	1%	11%	44%
OH Predictive Insights	January 11–13, 2022	302 (RV)	± 5.6%	25%	7%	6%	11%	4%	–	47%
OH Predictive Insights	November 1–8, 2021	252 (RV)	± 6.2%	27%	5%	9%	12%	2%	–	46%
Fabrizio Lee (R)	October 26–28, 2021	800 (LV)	± 3.5%	26%	4%	14%	2%	2%	<1% (Note: Paveza with <1%)	52%
OnMessage Inc. (R) (Note: This poll was sponsored by Advancing Arizona Forward, which supports Mark Brnovich.)	September 9–12, 2021	500 (LV)	± 4.4%	41%	5%	7%	4%	–	–	43%
OH Predictive Insights	September 7–12, 2021	311 (RV)	± 5.6%	27%	3%	6%	14%	–	–	51%
Fabrizio Lee (R)	August 4–8, 2021	800 (LV)	± 3.5%	29%	7%	5%	3%	–	<1%	56%
HighGround Public Affairs (R)	May 3–5, 2021	400 (LV)	± 4.9%	28%	–	1%	1%	–	–	61%

Hypothetical polling

Poll source	Date(s) administered	Sample size	Margin of error	Kirk Adams	Andy Biggs	Mark Brnovich	Doug Ducey	Jim Lamon	Blake Masters	Michael McGuire	Justin Olson	Other	Undecided
co/efficient (R)	February 6–8, 2022	755 (LV)	± 3.6%	–	–	14%	13%	11%	11%	3%	1%	9%	38%
OH Predictive Insights	January 11–13, 2022	302 (RV)	± 5.6%	–	–	13%	35%	4%	4%	9%	2%	–	34%
WPA Intelligence (R) (Note: This poll was sponsored by Club for Growth Action.)	April 5–6, 2021	505 (LV)	± 4.4%	–	46%	–	45%	–	–	–	–	–	9%
OH Predictive Insights	March 8–12, 2021	690 (RV)	± 3.7%	2% (Note: Response without candidates' job titles, besides 'Major General' for McGuire)	27%	–	–	–	2%	3%	–	–	67%
OH Predictive Insights	March 8–12, 2021	690 (RV)	± 3.7%	6% (Note: Response with candidates' job titles)	26%	–	–	–	2%	10%	–	–	56%
Data Orbital (R) (Note: This poll was sponsored by Andy Biggs's campaign committee.)	February 17–19, 2021	600 (LV)	± 4.0%	2%	36%	–	–	1%	1%	3%	–	4%	53%

=== Results ===
Republican primary results by county Masters: 30–40%; 40–50%; Lamon: 30–40%

Republican primary results
Party	Candidate	Votes	%
Republican	Blake Masters	327,198	40.24%
Republican	Jim Lamon	228,467	28.10%
Republican	Mark Brnovich	144,092	17.72%
Republican	Michael McGuire	71,100	8.75%
Republican	Justin Olson	41,985	5.16%
Write-in		226	0.03%
Total votes		813,068	100.0%

== Libertarian primary ==
=== Candidates ===
==== Nominee ====
- Marc Victor, attorney and nominee for U.S. Senate in 2012 (withdrew from general election, endorsed Blake Masters)

=== Results ===
Libertarian primary results
Party	Candidate	Votes	%
Libertarian	Marc Victor	3,065	100.0%
Total votes		3,065	100.0%

== General election ==
In what was initially expected to be one of the most widely contested elections in the nation, Kelly amassed a massive fundraising advantage over Masters, raising a record $75 million compared to Masters's $12 million. Due to the Supreme Court's Dobbs v. Jackson Women's Health Organization decision, which reversed Roe v. Wade, Kelly spent the campaign heavily attacking Masters over his anti-abortion stance, which was seen as hurting Masters especially among women voters. He also attacked Masters's support for privatizing Social Security, as Arizona has many retired seniors who use the program. Masters's claim that the 2020 presidential election was stolen also hurt him among voters. Steven J. Law, the leader of a Republican-aligned super PAC, said that Masters "had scored the worst focus group results of any candidate he had ever seen," and cancelled all of its Arizona television advertisements supporting Masters to divert money to other races.

With the limited amount of money he had, Masters attempted to portray Kelly as weak on illegal immigration, supportive of spending programs that caused inflation, and too supportive of President Joe Biden. In the final weeks of the campaign, Republican groups increased the amount of money they were spending on the race and polls began to tighten, and many news outlets moved the race from lean Democrat to tossup. However, in the end, Kelly relatively easily defeated Masters, which helped Democrats in retaining the Senate. According to Ron Brownstein of CNN in 2023, Kelly won independent voters by double-digit margins, which contributed to Masters's defeat.

=== Predictions ===
Source	Ranking	As of
The Cook Political Report	Tossup	October 27, 2022
Inside Elections	Tilt D	October 21, 2022
Sabato's Crystal Ball	Lean D	October 19, 2022
Politico	Tossup	October 27, 2022
RCP	Tossup	October 25, 2022
Fox News	Tossup	October 25, 2022
DDHQ	Lean D	October 25, 2022
FiveThirtyEight	Lean D	October 25, 2022
The Economist	Lean D	November 1, 2022

=== Debates ===
2022 United States Senate general election in Arizona debates
No.	Date	Host	Moderator	Link	Democratic	Republican	Libertarian
P Participant A Absent N Non-invitee I Invitee W Withdrawn							
P Participant A Absent N Non-invitee I Invitee W Withdrawn					Mark Kelly	Blake Masters	Marc Victor
1	October 6, 2022	Arizona PBS	Ted Simons		P	P	P

=== Endorsements ===
Mark Kelly (D)

U.S. executive branch officials

- Barack Obama, 44th president of the United States (2009–2017)
- Miles Taylor, former chief of staff to the U.S. secretary of Homeland Security (2019) (Forward)
- Christine Todd Whitman, former administrator of the Environmental Protection Agency (2001–2003) and former governor of New Jersey (1994–2001) (Forward)

U.S. senators

- Alex Padilla, U.S. senator from California (2021–present)
- Kyrsten Sinema, U.S. senator from Arizona (2019–2025)

U.S. representatives

- Raúl Grijalva, U.S. representative from Arizona's 3rd congressional district (2013–2025)

U.S. attorneys

- Paul K. Charlton, former U.S. attorney for the District of Arizona (2001–2007) (Republican)

State legislators

- Kirsten Engel, former state senator (2021) from the 10th district
- Pete Hershberger, former state representative (2001–2008) from the 26th district (Republican)
- Roberta Voss, former state representative (1997–2003) from the 19th district (Republican)

Local officials

- Cathy Carlat, mayor of Peoria (2015–present) (Republican)
- Jack Dillenberg, mayor of Jerome (2020–present) (Republican)
- John Giles, mayor of Mesa (2014–2025) (Republican)
- Donald Huish, mayor of Douglas (2016–present) (Republican)
- Paul Johnson, former mayor of Phoenix (1990–1994) and Democratic candidate for governor of Arizona in 1994 and 1998 (Independent)
- Craig McFarland, mayor of Casa Grande (2016–present) (Republican)
- David Ortega, mayor of Scottsdale (2021–present) (Independent)
- Regina Romero, mayor of Tucson, Arizona (2019–present)
- Chip Wilson, mayor of Apache Junction (2018–present) (Republican)

Individuals

- Jill Biden, First Lady of the United States
- Camila Cabello, singer
- Kerry Washington, actress

Labor unions

- Communications Workers of America
- International Federation of Professional and Technical Engineers
- National Association of Social Workers
- National Education Association
- United Auto Workers
- United Mine Workers of America

Organizations

- 314 Action
- BOLD Democrats
- Brady Campaign
- Common Defense PAC
- End Citizens United
- Equality Arizona
- Feminist Majority PAC
- Forward Party
- Human Rights Campaign
- J Street PAC
- Jewish Dems
- League of Conservation Voters
- March On
- MoveOn
- NARAL Pro-Choice America
- National Organization for Women
- National Committee to Preserve Social Security and Medicare
- Our Voice, Our Vote PAC
- Planned Parenthood Action Fund
- Population Connection Action Fund
- Progressive Turnout Project
- Renew America Movement
- Serve America PAC
- Sierra Club
- Stonewall Democrats
- Voter Protection Project
- VoteVets.org
Blake Masters (R)

U.S. executive branch officials

- Duke Buchan, U.S. ambassador to Spain and Andorra (2018–2021)
- Richard Grenell, former U.S. ambassador to Germany (2018–2020)
- David M. McIntosh, former director of the Domestic Policy Council (1987–1988) and former U.S. representative from Indiana's 2nd congressional district (1995–2001)
- Robert C. O'Brien, former U.S. national security advisor (2019–2021)
- Kash Patel, former chief of staff to the acting U.S. secretary of defense
- Mike Pence, 48th vice president of the United States (2017–2021) and former governor of Indiana (2013–2017)
- Matt Schlapp, White House director of political affairs (2003–2005)
- Mercedes Schlapp, White House director of strategic communications (2017–2019)
- Donald Trump, 45th president of the United States (2017–2021)
- Chad Wolf, acting U.S. secretary of Homeland Security (2019–2021), under secretary of Homeland Security for Strategy, Policy, and Plans (2019–2021) and assistant secretary of Homeland Security for Strategy, Plans, Analysis, and Risk (2019)

U.S. senators

- Tom Cotton, U.S. senator from Arkansas (2015–present)
- Ted Cruz, U.S. senator from Texas (2013–present)
- Josh Hawley, U.S. senator from Missouri (2019–present) and former Missouri attorney general (2017–2019)
- Rand Paul, U.S. senator from Kentucky (2011–present)
- Rick Scott, U.S. senator from Florida (2019–present) and former governor of Florida (2011–2019)

U.S. representatives

- Jim Banks, U.S. representative from Indiana's 3rd congressional district (2017–2025)
- Andy Biggs, U.S. representative from Arizona's 5th congressional district (2017–present)
- Madison Cawthorn, U.S. representative from North Carolina's 11th congressional district (2021–2023)
- Tulsi Gabbard, former U.S. representative from Hawaii's 2nd congressional district (2013–2021) and former vice chair of the Democratic National Committee (2013–2016) (Independent)
- Matt Gaetz, U.S. representative from Florida's 1st congressional district (2017–2024)
- Paul Gosar, U.S. representative from Arizona's 4th congressional district (2013–2023), U.S. Representative from Arizona's 1st congressional district (2011-2013)
- Debbie Lesko, U.S. representative from Arizona's 8th congressional district (2018–2025)
- Ron Paul, former U.S. representative (R-TX) (1976-1977, 1979-1985, 1997-2013), candidate for president in 1988, 2008 and 2012 (Libertarian)
- David Schweikert, U.S. representative from Arizona's 6th congressional district (2013–2023), U.S. Representative from Arizona's 5th congressional district (2011-2013)
- Marjorie Taylor Greene, U.S. representative from Georgia's 14th congressional district (2021–2026)

Governors

- Jan Brewer, former governor of Arizona (2009–2015) and former secretary of state of Arizona (2003–2009)
- Ron DeSantis, governor of Florida (2019–present) and former U.S. representative from Florida's 6th congressional district (2013–2018)
- Doug Ducey, governor of Arizona (2015–2023) and former Arizona state treasurer (2011–2015)
- Fife Symington, former governor of Arizona (1991–1997)

Local officials

- Mark Lamb, sheriff of Pinal County (2017–2024)

Party officials

- Kelli Ward, chair of the Arizona Republican Party (2019–2023)

Individuals

- Tucker Carlson, host of Tucker Carlson Tonight and conservative political commentator
- Nick Fuentes, far-right livestreamer and white supremacist
- Sean Hannity, host of Hannity and The Sean Hannity Show and conservative political commentator
- Chuck Norris, martial artist and actor
- Jack Posobiec, political activist
- Dave Smith, comedian, podcaster, and co-host of Legion of Skanks (Libertarian)
- Peter Thiel, venture capitalist
- Marc Victor, former Libertarian nominee for Arizona's other Senate seat in 2012 (Libertarian)

Labor unions

- National Border Patrol Council

Organizations

- Arizona Republican Party
- Campaign for Working Families
- Center for Arizona Policy
- Club for Growth
- The Conservative Caucus
- FreedomWorks for America
- National Federation of Independent Business
- National Right to Life Committee
- NRA Political Victory Fund
- Political Victory Fund
- Republicans for National Renewal
- Tea Party Express
- Turning Point Action

Rejected by candidate

- Andrew Anglin, neo-Nazi and founder of The Daily Stormer

=== Polling ===
Aggregate polls

Source of poll aggregation	Dates administered	Dates updated	Mark Kelly (D)	Blake Masters (R)	Undecided (Note: Calculated by taking the difference of 100% and all other candidates combined.)	Margin
RealClearPolitics	October 30 – November 7, 2022	November 7, 2022	48.0%	48.3%	3.7%	Masters +0.3
FiveThirtyEight	September 7, 2021 – November 7, 2022	November 7, 2022	48.6%	47.1%	4.3%	Kelly +1.5
270ToWin	November 3–7, 2022	November 7, 2022	47.9%	46.6%	5.5%	Kelly +1.3
Average			48.3%	47.2%	4.5%	Kelly +1.1

View source data.

Poll source	Date(s) administered	Sample size	Margin of error	Mark Kelly (D)	Blake Masters (R)	Marc Victor (L)	Other	Undecided
The Trafalgar Group (R)	November 5–7, 2022	1,094 (LV)	± 2.9%	47%	48%	1%	–	4%
Data Orbital (R)	November 4–6, 2022	550 (LV)	± 4.3%	48%	47%	2%	1% (Note: "Refused" with 1%)	3%
Research Co.	November 4–6, 2022	450 (LV)	± 4.6%	49%	46%	2%	–	3%
Data for Progress (D)	November 2–6, 2022	1,359 (LV)	± 3.0%	49%	50%	2%	–	–
Targoz Market Research	November 2–6, 2022	560 (LV)	± 4.1%	50%	47%	2%	–	–
KAConsulting (R) (Note: Poll conducted for Citizens United, a conservative non-profit organization.)	November 2–3, 2022	501 (LV)	± 4.4%	47%	46%	–	1%	6%
InsiderAdvantage (R)	November 2, 2022	550 (LV)	± 4.2%	48%	48%	2%	–	2%
HighGround Inc.	November 1–2, 2022	500 (LV)	± 4.4%	46%	45%	–	2% (Note: "Some other candidate" with 2%)	6%
Remington Research Group (R)	November 1–2, 2022	1,075 (LV)	± 2.9%	48%	47%	2%	–	3%
Marist College	October 31 – November 2, 2022	1,157 (RV)	± 4.1%	49%	45%	–	1% (Note: "Another party's candidate" with 1%)	8%
Marist College	October 31 – November 2, 2022	1,015 (LV)	± 4.3%	50%	47%	–	1% (Note: "Another party's candidate" with 1%)	2%
Big Data Poll (R)	October 31 – November 2, 2022	1,051 (LV)	± 3.0%	48%	49%	–	–	4%
Patriot Polling (R)	October 30 – November 2, 2022	814 (RV)	–	49%	48%	–	–	4%
Civiqs	October 29 – November 2, 2022	852 (LV)	± 4.2%	49%	49%	–	2% (Note: "Someone else" with 2%)	1%
	November 1, 2022	Victor withdraws from the race and endorses Masters						
Emerson College	October 30 – November 1, 2022	1,000 (LV)	± 3.0%	47%	48%	3%	1% (Note: "Someone else" with 1%)	1%
Emerson College	October 30 – November 1, 2022	1,000 (LV)	± 3.0%	48%	48%	3%	1% (Note: "Someone else" with 1%)	–
The Phillips Academy	October 29–30, 2022	985 (LV)	± 3.1%	47%	47%	2%	–	5%
Fox News	October 26–30, 2022	1,003 (RV)	± 3.0%	47%	45%	–	4% (Note: "Other" with 3%; "Wouldn't vote" with 1%)	5%
Wick Insights (R)	October 26–30, 2022	1,122 (LV)	± 3.2%	49%	47%	–	3% (Note: "Someone else" with 3%)	1%
Fabrizio, Lee and Associates (R)	October 24–26, 2022	800 (LV)	± 3.5%	47%	46%	3%	–	–
OH Predictive Insights	October 24–26, 2022	600 (LV)	± 4.0%	48%	46%	3%	–	3%
Siena College/NYT	October 24–26, 2022	604 (LV)	± 4.4%	51%	45%	1%	–	3%
BSP Research/Shaw & Co. (Note: Poll conducted for Univision.)	October 19–26, 2022	1,000 (RV)	± 3.1%	44%	40%	–	5% (Note: "Someone else" with 5%)	11%
InsiderAdvantage (R)	October 24–25, 2022	550 (LV)	± 4.2%	45%	43%	6%	–	6%
co/efficient (R)	October 20–21, 2022	1,111 (LV)	± 3.1%	47%	45%	4%	–	4%
Susquehanna Polling & Research (R) (Note: Poll conducted for The Federalist, a conservative online magazine.)	October 14–18, 2022	600 (LV)	± 4.0%	48%	45%	2%	<1% (Note: "Other" with <1%; "Refused" with <1%)	6%
The Trafalgar Group (R) (Note: This poll was sponsored by The Daily Wire.)	October 16–17, 2022	1,078 (LV)	± 2.9%	47%	46%	3%	–	4%
Data for Progress (D)	October 11–17, 2022	893 (LV)	± 3.0%	47%	47%	3%	–	4%
Wick Insights (R)	October 8–14, 2022	1,058 (LV)	± 3.1%	49%	46%	–	2% (Note: "Someone else" with 2%)	3%
HighGround Inc. (Note: This poll was sponsored by Arizona's Family.)	October 12–13, 2022	500 (LV)	± 4.3%	42%	40%	5%	3% (Note: "Some other candidate" with 3%)	10%
InsiderAdvantage (R)	October 11, 2022	550 (LV)	± 4.2%	46%	42%	5%	–	7%
Kurt Jetta (D) (Note: This poll was sponsored by Center Street PAC, which opposes Masters.)	October 9–10, 2022	894 (RV)	–	54%	32%	–	–	15%
Kurt Jetta (D)	October 9–10, 2022	551 (LV)	–	55%	38%	–	–	7%
Ascend Action (R)	October 8–10, 2022	954 (LV)	± 3.2%	48%	44%	–	5% (Note: "Another candidate" with 5%)	2%
OnMessage Inc. (R) (Note: This poll was sponsored by the Sentinel Action Fund, which supports Masters.)	October 8–10, 2022	600 (LV)	± 4.0%	46%	43%	4%	–	7%
OH Predictive Insights	October 4–6, 2022	674 (LV)	± 3.8%	46%	33%	15%	–	7%
Big Data Poll (R)	October 2–5, 2022	970 (LV)	± 3.1%	46%	45%	2%	–	7%
YouGov/CBS News	September 30 – October 4, 2022	1,164 (RV)	± 3.8%	51%	48%	–	–	1%
CNN/SSRS	September 26 – October 2, 2022	900 (RV)	± 4.4%	52%	42%	–	7% (Note: "Neither" with 5%; "Other" with 2%)	–
CNN/SSRS	September 26 – October 2, 2022	795 (LV)	± 4.6%	51%	45%	–	4% (Note: "Neither" with 3%; "Other" with 1%)	–
Fox News	September 22–26, 2022	1,008 (RV)	± 3.0%	46%	40%	–	6% (Note: "Other" with 3%; "Wouldn't vote" with 3%)	9%
Suffolk University	September 21–25, 2022	500 (LV)	± 4.4%	49%	42%	2%	–	7%
Marist College	September 19–22, 2022	1,260 (RV)	± 3.6%	51%	41%	–	–	8%
Marist College	September 19–22, 2022	1,076 (LV)	± 3.9%	50%	45%	–	–	5%
Data for Progress (D)	September 15–19, 2022	768 (LV)	± 4.0%	48%	47%	2%	–	3%
The Trafalgar Group (R)	September 14–17, 2022	1080 (LV)	± 2.9%	47%	45%	3%	–	5%
Fabrizio Ward (R)/Impact Research (D)	September 8–15, 2022	500 (LV)	± 4.4%	50%	42%	4%	–	4%
Fabrizio Ward (R)/Impact Research (D)	September 8–15, 2022	500 (LV)	± 4.4%	52%	45%	–	–	3%
OnMessage Inc. (R)	September 6–11, 2022	400 (LV)	± 4.9%	50%	40%	6%	–	5%
Kurt Jetta (D)	September 9–10, 2022	972 (RV)	± 3.5%	53%	32%	–	–	15%
Kurt Jetta (D)	September 9–10, 2022	563 (LV)	± 3.5%	55%	35%	–	–	9%
OH Predictive Insights	September 6–9, 2022	654 (LV)	± 3.8%	47%	35%	6%	–	12%
Emerson College	September 6–7, 2022	627 (LV)	± 3.9%	47%	45%	–	3% (Note: "Someone else" with 3%)	5%
InsiderAdvantage (R)	September 6–7, 2022	550 (LV)	± 4.2%	45%	39%	4%	–	12%
Echelon Insights	August 31 – September 7, 2022	773 (RV)	±4.5%	52%	37%	–	–	11%
The Trafalgar Group (R)	August 24–27, 2022	1,074 (LV)	± 2.9%	48%	44%	4%	–	4%
RMG Research	August 16–22, 2022	750 (LV)	± 3.6%	50%	43%	–	–	7%
Fox News	August 12–16, 2022	1,012 (RV)	± 3.0%	50%	42%	–	2%	6%
Kurt Jetta (D)	August 4–8, 2022	1,107 (A)	± 2.9%	48%	34%	–	–	19%
Kurt Jetta (D)	August 4–8, 2022	877 (RV)	± 3.3%	50%	34%	–	–	16%
Kurt Jetta (D)	August 4–8, 2022	512 (LV)	± 4.3%	54%	40%	–	–	7%
OnMessage Inc. (R) (Note: This poll was sponsored by America Next.)	August 1–2, 2022	600 (LV)	± 4.0%	49%	44%	–	–	7%
Beacon Research (D) (Note: This poll was sponsored by the Environmental Voter Project.)	July 5–20, 2022	802 (RV)	± 3.5%	49%	34%	–	1%	13%
Beacon Research (D)	July 5–20, 2022	504 (LV)	± 4.4%	51%	39%	–	2%	8%
Fabrizio Lee (R)	July 13–14, 2022	800 (LV)	± 3.5%	49%	44%	–	–	7%
Change Research (D) (Note: This poll was sponsored by Future Majority and America's Future Majority Fund.)	June 24–27, 2022	705 (LV)	± 3.7%	48%	39%	–	–	13%
Blueprint Polling (D)	May 12–16, 2022	608 (LV)	± 4.0%	49%	32%	–	–	19%
OH Predictive Insights	September 7–12, 2021	882 (RV)	± 3.3%	44%	35%	–	–	21%

Hypothetical polling

Mark Kelly vs. Mark Brnovich

Poll source	Date(s) administered	Sample size	Margin of error	Mark Kelly (D)	Mark Brnovich (R)	Other	Undecided
Beacon Research (D)	July 5–20, 2022	802 (RV)	± 3.5%	49%	35%	1%	11%
Beacon Research (D)	July 5–20, 2022	504 (LV)	± 4.4%	51%	40%	2%	7%
Blueprint Polling (D)	May 12–16, 2022	608 (LV)	± 4.0%	50%	33%	–	18%
Data for Progress (D)	January 21–24, 2022	1,469 (LV)	± 3.0%	49%	47%	–	4%
OH Predictive Insights	September 7–12, 2021	882 (RV)	± 3.3%	43%	39%	–	18%
OH Predictive Insights	May 3–5, 2021	935 (RV)	± 3.2%	46%	36%	–	18%

Mark Kelly vs. Jim Lamon

Poll source	Date(s) administered	Sample size	Margin of error	Mark Kelly (D)	Jim Lamon (R)	Other	Undecided
Beacon Research (D)	July 5–20, 2022	802 (RV)	± 3.5%	48%	34%	2%	14%
Beacon Research (D)	July 5–20, 2022	504 (LV)	± 4.4%	50%	40%	2%	9%
Change Research (D)	June 24–27, 2022	705 (LV)	± 3.7%	47%	41%	–	12%
Blueprint Polling (D)	May 12–16, 2022	608 (LV)	± 4.0%	48%	34%	–	18%
OH Predictive Insights	September 7–12, 2021	882 (RV)	± 3.3%	43%	36%	–	21%

Mark Kelly vs. Michael McGuire

Poll source	Date(s) administered	Sample size	Margin of error	Mark Kelly (D)	Michael McGuire (R)	Undecided
OH Predictive Insights	September 7–12, 2021	882 (RV)	± 3.3%	44%	37%	19%
OH Predictive Insights	May 3–5, 2021	935 (RV)	± 3.2%	44%	35%	21%

Mark Kelly vs. Andy Biggs

Poll source	Date(s) administered	Sample size	Margin of error	Mark Kelly (D)	Andy Biggs (R)	Undecided
OH Predictive Insights	May 3–5, 2021	935 (RV)	± 3.2%	47%	36%	18%

Mark Kelly vs. Doug Ducey

Poll source	Date(s) administered	Sample size	Margin of error	Mark Kelly (D)	Doug Ducey (R)	Undecided
Data for Progress (D)	January 21–24, 2022	1,469 (LV)	± 3.0%	50%	47%	4%

Mark Kelly vs. Kelli Ward

Poll source	Date(s) administered	Sample size	Margin of error	Mark Kelly (D)	Kelli Ward (R)	Undecided
OH Predictive Insights	May 3–5, 2021	935 (RV)	± 3.2%	47%	36%	18%

Mark Kelly vs. Kari Lake

Poll source	Date(s) administered	Sample size	Margin of error	Mark Kelly (D)	Kari Lake (R)	Undecided
OH Predictive Insights	May 3–5, 2021	935 (RV)	± 3.2%	46%	35%	19%

Mark Kelly vs. Jack McCain

Poll source	Date(s) administered	Sample size	Margin of error	Mark Kelly (D)	Jack McCain (R)	Undecided
OH Predictive Insights	May 3–5, 2021	935 (RV)	± 3.2%	43%	29%	28%

Mark Kelly vs. Kimberly Yee

Poll source	Date(s) administered	Sample size	Margin of error	Mark Kelly (D)	Kimberly Yee (R)	Undecided
OH Predictive Insights	May 3–5, 2021	935 (RV)	± 3.2%	45%	35%	19%

Mark Kelly vs. generic Republican

Poll source	Date(s) administered	Sample size	Margin of error	Mark Kelly (D)	Generic Republican	Other	Undecided
OH Predictive Insights	May 9–16, 2022	938 (RV)	± 3.3%	40%	39%	–	21%
HighGround Public Affairs (R)	March 26–27, 2022	400 (LV)	± 4.9%	45%	41%	2%	12%
OH Predictive Insights	March 7–15, 2022	753 (RV)	± 3.6%	37%	39%	–	24%
Change Research (D)	March 2022	– (LV)	–	43%	46%	–	11%
OH Predictive Insights	January 11–13, 2022	855 (RV)	± 3.4%	42%	38%	–	19%
OH Predictive Insights	November 1–8, 2021	713 (RV)	± 3.7%	40%	39%	–	21%

Mark Kelly vs. generic opponent

Poll source	Date(s) administered	Sample size	Margin of error	Mark Kelly (D)	Generic Opponent	Undecided
Fabrizio Lee (R)	July 13–14, 2022	800 (LV)	± 3.5%	45%	48%	7%

Generic Democrat vs. generic Republican

Poll source	Date(s) administered	Sample size	Margin of error	Generic Democrat	Generic Republican	Undecided
Fabrizio Lee (R)	July 13–14, 2022	800 (LV)	± 3.5%	46%	46%	8%

=== Results ===
2022 United States Senate election in Arizona
Party	Candidate	Votes	%	±%
Democratic	Mark Kelly (incumbent)	1,322,027	51.39%	+0.23%
Republican	Blake Masters	1,196,308	46.51%	−2.30%
Libertarian	Marc Victor (withdrawn)	53,762	2.09%	N/A
Write-in		197	0.01%	–0.02%
Total votes		2,572,294	100.0%	
Democratic hold				

==== By county ====
By county

County	Mark Kelly Democratic		Blake Masters Republican		Marc Victor Libertarian		Write-in		Margin		Total votes
County	#	%	#	%	#	%	#	%	#	%	Total votes
Apache	18,005	67.39	8,163	30.55	549	2.05	2	0.01	9,842	36.84	26,719
Cochise	20,002	42.57	25,539	54.35	1,383	2.94	67	0.14	-5,537	-11.78	46,991
Coconino	35,149	63.84	18,697	33.96	1,199	2.18	13	0.02	16,452	29.88	55,058
Gila	7,984	35.42	13,958	61.91	601	2.67	1	0.00	-5,974	-26.50	22,544
Graham	3,243	29.79	7,388	67.87	255	2.34	0	0.00	-4,145	-38.08	10,886
Greenlee	970	39.40	1,392	56.54	100	4.06	0	0.00	-422	-17.14	2,462
La Paz	1,711	30.94	3,656	66.11	160	2.89	3	0.05	-1,945	-35.17	5,530
Maricopa	809,573	52.19	710,491	45.80	31,099	2.00	63	0.00	99,082	6.39	1,551,226
Mohave	21,040	25.69	58,737	71.72	2,117	2.58	5	0.01	-37,697	-46.03	81,899
Navajo	18,724	46.08	20,970	51.61	927	2.28	9	0.02	-2,246	-5.53	40,630
Pima	248,230	61.95	144,936	36.17	7,544	1.88	15	0.00	103,294	25.78	400,725
Pinal	62,009	42.92	78,820	54.55	3,650	2.53	7	0.00	-16,811	-11.64	144,486
Santa Cruz	8,988	68.16	3,892	29.52	304	2.31	2	0.02	5,096	38.65	13,186
Yavapai	45,258	36.60	75,752	61.26	2,633	2.13	8	0.01	-30,494	-24.66	123,651
Yuma	21,141	45.66	23,917	51.66	1,241	2.68	2	0.00	-2,776	-6.00	46,301
Totals	1,322,027	51.39	1,196,308	46.51	53,762	2.09	197	0.01	125,719	4.89	2,572,294

==== By congressional district ====
Kelly won five of nine congressional districts, including two that elected Republicans.

District	Kelly	Masters	Representative
1st	52%	46%	David Schweikert
2nd	46%	51%	Tom O'Halleran (117th Congress)
2nd	46%	51%	Eli Crane (118th Congress)
3rd	76%	21%	Ruben Gallego
4th	57%	41%	Greg Stanton
5th	44%	54%	Andy Biggs
6th	54%	44%	Ann Kirkpatrick (117th Congress)
6th	54%	44%	Juan Ciscomani (118th Congress)
7th	68%	30%	Raúl Grijalva
8th	46%	52%	Debbie Lesko
9th	38%	60%	Paul Gosar

== See also ==
- 2022 United States Senate elections
- 2022 United States House of Representatives elections in Arizona
- 2022 Arizona gubernatorial election
- 2022 Arizona elections

== Notes ==
Partisan clients
