= Zero to One =

2014 book by Peter Thiel and Blake Masters

Zero to One: Notes on Startups, or How to Build the Future
- Author: Peter Thiel with Blake Masters
- Language: English
- Subject: Business, politics & government
- Publisher: Crown Business
- Publication date: September 16, 2014
- Publication place: United States
- Pages: 224 (first edition)
- ISBN: 978-0804139298
- Website: Official website

Zero to One: Notes on Startups, or How to Build the Future is a 2014 book by the American entrepreneur and investor Peter Thiel, co-written with Blake Masters. It is a condensed and updated version of a highly popular set of online notes taken by Masters for the CS183 class on startups, of which he was a student, as taught by Thiel at Stanford University in Spring 2012.

== Promotion ==
To promote the book, Peter Thiel sent out his first (and only) tweet ever on September 8, 2014. He was also interviewed by Alexia Tsotsis of TechCrunch. On September 9, Thiel was interviewed on Timothy Ferriss' podcast. On September 11, Thiel answered questions for Ask Me Anything on Reddit.

On September 13, Thiel appeared on NPR with host Wade Goodwyn to discuss the book.

== Synopsis ==
Zero to One argues that the future of technology and economic progress depends on creating entirely new innovations, described as going from “0 to 1,” rather than copying existing ideas, which Thiel calls going from “1 to n.” He contrasts the benefits of first-mover innovation with the “last mover advantage,” the potential gains from entering an established market later, and emphasizes that substantial progress comes from building unique, proprietary value rather than incremental improvements, and speaks on anecdotal experiences when building PayPal, and later Palantir.

Thiel explores several major concepts underlying successful startups and businesses. He discusses the role of monopolies in promoting innovation and profitability, the importance of uncovering secrets, unique knowledge that others do not see, and the significance of cultivating a strong company culture that encourages productivity, collaboration, and long-term commitment. The book also addresses strategic business decisions, including how companies can shape their market scope and capture value efficiently.

Throughout the book, Thiel illustrates these ideas with examples from both technology and traditional industries. He highlights Google as a technology company that captures value effectively and contrasts it with the airline industry, which operates with lower margins despite creating substantial economic value. Thiel also references historical events such as the dot-com bubble and the 2008 financial crisis, as well as philosophical concepts and allusions to other works, to provide context for his arguments and to underscore patterns in innovation and economic development.

== Reception ==
In The Atlantic, Derek Thompson describes Thiel's book as possibly the best business book he has ever read. In his review article, he wrote: "Peter Thiel's new book, Zero to One, shines like a laser beam. Yes, this is a self-help book for entrepreneurs, bursting with bromides and sunny confidence about the future that only start-ups can build. But much more than that, it's also a lucid and profound articulation of capitalism and success in the 21st century economy" and "it's surprising in a wonderful way just how simple Zero to One feels. Barely 200 pages long, and well lit by clear prose and pithy aphorisms, Thiel has written a perfectly tweetable treatise and a relentlessly thought-provoking handbook".

Publishers Weekly wrote of the book: "Thiel touches on how to build a successful business, but the discussion is too abstract to offer much to the next Steve Jobs—or Peter Thiel."

In November 2014, Timothy B. Lee reviewed the book for Vox.com, writing that although Thiel's book contained some good advice, he made the advice sound more contrarian than it really was, did not provide sufficiently concrete advice, and made some questionable claims.

In The New Atlantis, James Poulos compares Thiel to Friedrich Nietzsche and argues Thiel, "the most political and theoretical of the supernerds," writes esoterically in Zero to One, when he "raises the prospect of a remarkably comprehensive failure among our best and brightest."
