= Mick McGuire (general) =

US Air Force general

Michael T. McGuire
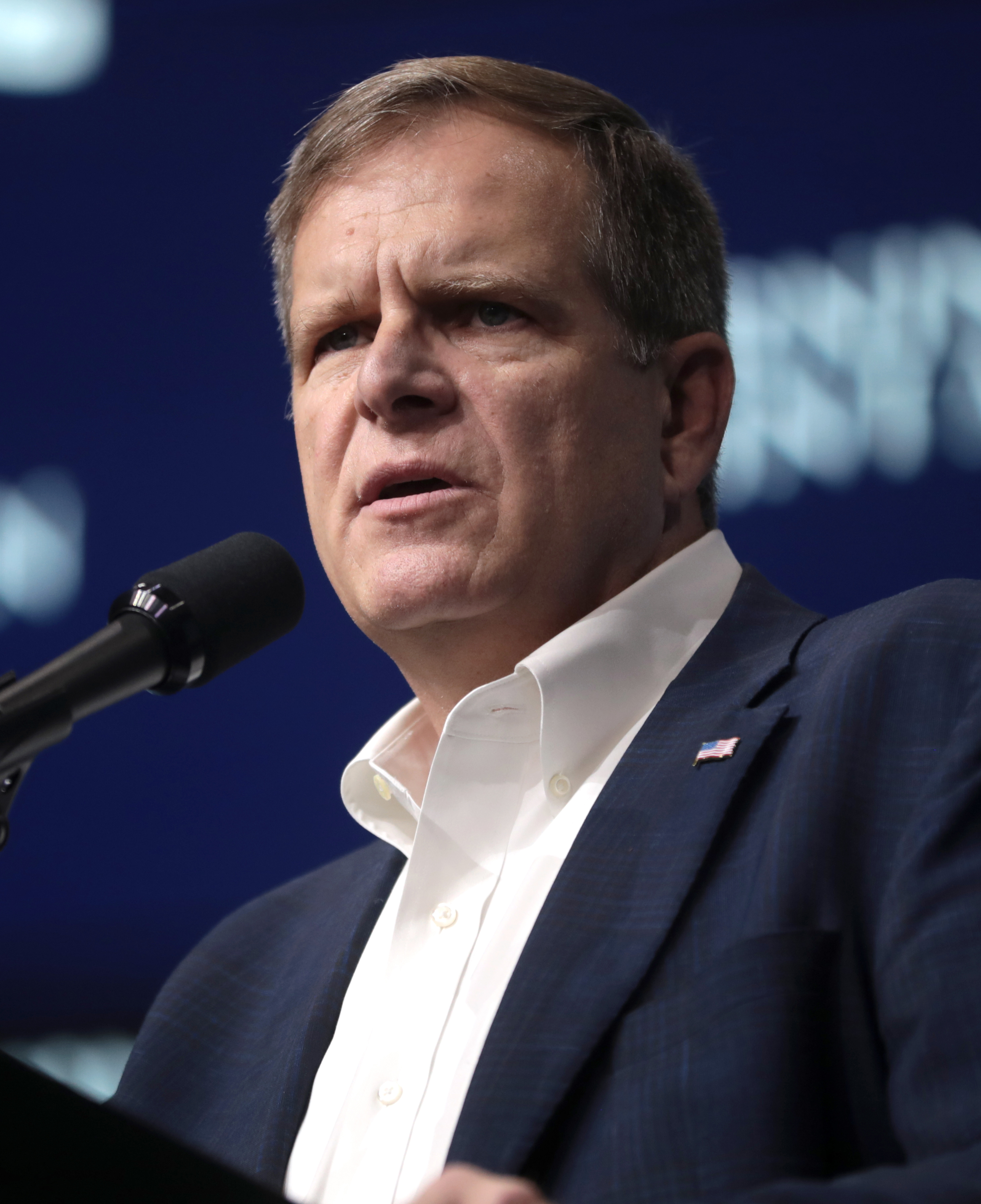
- McGuire in 2021
- Born: Michael Thomas McGuire; Lompoc, California, U.S.
- Alma mater: United States Air Force Academy (BS)
- Military career
- Allegiance: United States
- Branch: United States Air Force
- Service years: 1985–2021
- Rank: Major general
- Nickname: Mick
- Units: 4th Fighter Squadron; 314th Fighter Squadron; 61st Fighter Squadron; 354th Fighter Wing; 18th Fighter Interceptor Squadron
- Commands: 148th Fighter Squadron; 214th Attack Group; 162nd Wing; Arizona National Guard
- Conflicts: Operation Desert Storm; Operation Southern Watch; Operation Northern Watch; Operation Enduring Freedom; Operation Iraqi Freedom
- Awards: Legion of Merit; Meritorious Service Medal; Air Medal; Aerial Achievement Medal; Air Force Commendation Medal; Air Force Achievement Medal

Michael Thomas "Mick" McGuire is a retired United States Air Force major general, and former adjutant general of the Arizona National Guard. A member of the Republican Party, he was a candidate for its nomination in the 2022 United States Senate election in Arizona.

== Early life and education ==
McGuire has lived in Arizona most of his adult life. He graduated from Arcadia High School, attending the United States Air Force Academy where he obtained a Bachelor of Science in chemistry. His education includes Squadron Officer School (SOS), Air Command and Staff College (ACSC), Air War College (AWC), Joint Task Force Commanders Course (NORTHCOM), Contingency Dual Status Command program, Senior Leadership Officer Course (SLOC), CAPSTONE, Harvard University, Senior Executives in National and International Security (SENIS), and Advanced Senior Leader Development Program-Strategic Engagement Seminar (ASLDP-SES). McGuire is married to Deborah (née Davila), daughter of former Vons CEO William Davila.

== Military service ==
McGuire received his commission from the United States Air Force Academy in 1987, and graduated pilot training at Sheppard Air Force Base.

As an F-16 fighter pilot, he flew combat missions during the Gulf War and Operation Northern Watch.

McGuire became the adjutant general of the Arizona National Guard in 2013. In 2020, he oversaw the mobilization of 85% of its troops to concurrently support border patrol, address civil unrest, and assist in the fight against COVID-19.

On January 8, 2021, McGuire was ordered to send Arizona National Guard troops to Washington, D.C. in response to the 2021 United States Capitol attack. He was the only adjutant general of the 54 state and territory adjutant generals to refuse the order due to concerns about the legality of the mission. He retired three months later.

=== Assignments ===
His assignments include F-16C, 56th Tactical Training Wing, MacDill AFB, Fla., F-16 Pilot, 4th Fighter Squadron, Hill AFB, Utah, deployment; August 1990 - March 1991, Pilot, Desert Storm/Desert Watch, United Arab Emirates, September 1992 - September 1993, F-16C Instructor Pilot/Programmer, 314th Fighter Squadron, Luke AFB, Ariz., September 1993 - September 1994, F-16C/D Instructor Pilot, 61st Fighter Squadron, Luke AFB, Ariz, September 1994 - March 1996, Flight Commander, 61st Fighter Squadron, Luke AFB, Ariz., March 1996 - October 1997, Weapons and Tactics Flight Commander, 354th Operations Support Squadron, Eielson AFB, Alaska, October 1997 - May 2001, F-16 Instructor Pilot, 18th Fighter Squadron, Eielson AFB, Alaska, deployment; April 1998 - July 1998, Pilot, Southern Watch, Saudi Arabia; September 2000 - October 2000, Pilot, Northern Watch, Turkey, May 2001 - May 2005, Assistant Director of Operations, F-16 Instructor Pilot, 148th Fighter Squadron, Air National Guard, Ariz., May 2005 - May 2006, Vice Commander, Operation Snowbird, F-16 A/C Instructor Pilot, 162nd Fighter Wing Detachment, ANG, Ariz., May 2007 - May 2008, Director of Operations, 148th Fighter Squadron, Tucson, ANG, Ariz., May 2008 - January 2010, Commander, 148th Fighter Squadron, ANG, Ariz., February 2010 - January 2011, Commander, 214th Reconnaissance Group, Davis-Monthan AFB, Ariz., deployment; April 2010 - December 2010, Pilot, Operation Enduring Freedom/Operation Iraqi Freedom, Davis-Monthan AFB, Ariz., February 2011 - September 2013, Commander, 162nd Fighter Wing, ANG, Ariz., September 2013 – April 2022, Adjutant General, Arizona, Phoenix, Arizona

=== Flight information ===
McGuire was rated as a command pilot and flew more than 4,000 hours in F-16 aircraft models A/C/E, MQ-1B.

=== Awards and decorations ===
- Legion of Merit
- Meritorious Service Medal three bronze oak leaf clusters
- Air Medal
- Aerial Achievement Medal with two bronze oak leaf clusters
- Air Force Commendation Medal
- Air Force Achievement medal bronze oak leaf cluster
- Air Force Outstanding Unit Citation "V" device and oak leaf cluster
- Combat Readiness Medal
- National Defense Service Medal with bronze star
- Southwest Asia Campaign with two bronze stars
- Global War on Terror Service Medal
- Air Force Overseas Ribbon - Short Tour
- Air Force Overseas Ribbon - Long Tour
- Air Force Longevity Service Medal with silver oak leaf cluster
- Armed Forces Reserve Medal with hourglass
- Air Force Training Ribbon
- Kuwait Liberation Medal - Saudi Arabia
- Kuwait Liberation Medal - Kuwait

== 2022 U.S. Senate race ==
McGuire announced his candidacy for U.S. Senate in Arizona on June 8, 2021, but lost the August 2, 2022, Republican primary to Blake Masters.
