= Blake Masters =

American venture capitalist and author (born 1986)

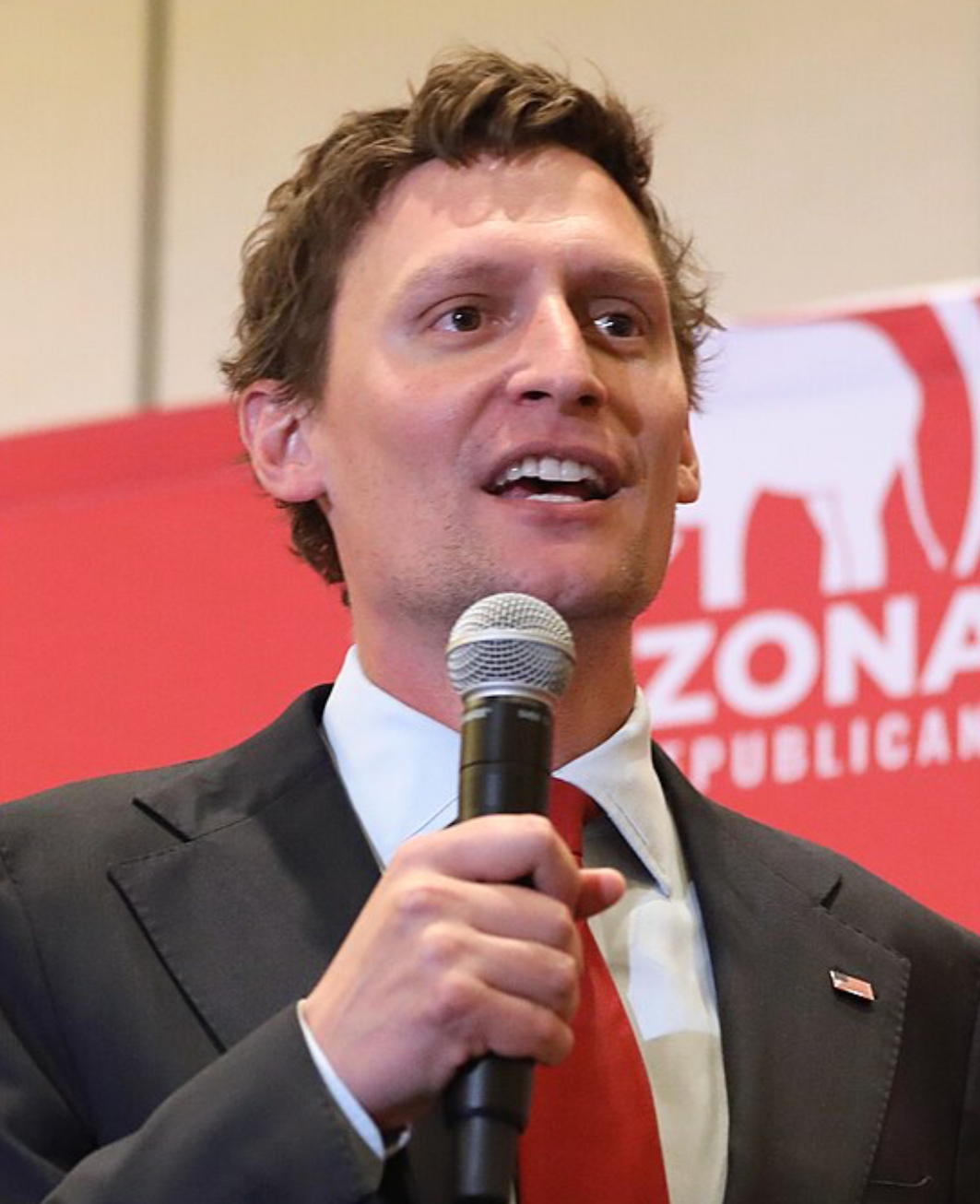
- Masters in 2024
- Born: Blake Gates Masters; August 5, 1986 (age 40); Denver, Colorado, U.S.
- Education: Stanford University (BA, JD)
- Occupations: Venture capitalist; author
- Employer(s): Thiel Capital, Thiel Foundation (former)
- Political party: Republican
- Spouse: Catherine Blanton (m. 2012)
- Children: 4

Blake Gates Masters (born August 5, 1986) is an American venture capitalist, author, former political candidate, and conspiracy theorist. Often regarded as a protégé of venture capitalist Peter Thiel, Masters co-wrote Zero to One: Notes on Startups, or How to Build the Future with Thiel in 2014, based on notes Masters had taken at Stanford Law School in 2012. He later served as chief operating officer (COO) of Thiel's investment firm, Thiel Capital, as well as president of the Thiel Foundation.

In the 2022 United States Senate election in Arizona, Masters defeated state Attorney General Mark Brnovich and businessman Jim Lamon to become the Republican Party nominee. He aligned himself with Thiel, who funded his primary campaign with $15 million, and Donald Trump, both of whom endorsed him in June 2022. Masters lost the general election to incumbent Democrat Mark Kelly, receiving the fewest votes among all statewide Republican candidates in the 2022 Arizona elections. The Washington Post called him one of the "worst candidates of the 2022 election."

Masters ran for the U.S. House in 2024 for Arizona's 8th congressional district. He lost the Republican primary to Abraham Hamadeh, coming in second.

== Early life and education ==
Masters was born in Denver, Colorado, in 1986, the son of Marilyn, who ran a tutoring center, and Scott Masters, who worked in the software industry. He grew up in Tucson, Arizona. In high school, Masters attended Green Fields Country Day School, a private school in Tucson, where he played basketball. He graduated in 2004. Masters received a bachelor's degree in political science from Stanford University in 2008. He then earned a J.D. from Stanford Law School in 2012.

=== Blog posts ===
As a teenage undergraduate, Masters expressed his political views on a CrossFit chat room and a LiveJournal blog. In a 2006 essay criticizing the War in Iraq on the libertarian site LewRockwell.com, Masters decried U.S. entry into World War I and described a quote from Nazi Hermann Goering on the susceptibility of the masses to incitements of war, as being "particularly representative and poignant". He also endorsed conspiracy theorist G. Edward Griffin's claim that the "Houses of Morgan and Rothschild" were linked to the sinking of the Lusitania.

During his college years, Masters contended that Iraq and al-Qaeda were not "substantial threats to Americans", calling for "unrestricted immigration" and an isolationist foreign policy. On his 2006 writings, he told the Jewish Insider in 2022, "I was 19, writing in opposition to the Iraq War—a stance that turned out to be prescient. I went too far and stated that no recent American wars have been just." He added: "I suppose it was only a matter of time before I got called antisemitic for criticizing wartime propaganda in an essay I wrote as a teenager."

Masters' posts became a political issue after they were unearthed during his 2022 Senate campaign. The Anti-Defamation League criticized him, and Masters' primary rival Jim Lamon ran television ads highlighting the posts.

== Work with Peter Thiel and political involvement ==
Masters spent four months in 2010 as a law clerk for a U.S. Attorney's Office. In January 2011 he met Thiel at Stanford Law School. They exchanged emails with each other a year later and Thiel invited Masters to attend a class he was to teach in spring 2012. Masters would post detailed notes from Thiel's lectures on a blog which grew popular within the tech community. Renditions of Masters' notes reappeared online, prompting Masters to get in contact with Thiel about compiling them into a book. Zero to One was released in September 2014 and received warm reviews from The Atlantic and Publishers Weekly. According to Politico, the book portrayed "globalization as the enemy of innovation." Masters was included on Forbes 30 Under 30 list in 2014.

Masters co-founded Judicata, a legal research service, in 2013. The website officially launched in 2017, though Masters left the project in 2014. The website was acquired by Fastcase in 2020. After meeting Thiel, Masters went to work for him, becoming chief operating officer of the investment firm Thiel Capital and president of the Thiel Foundation. Thiel chose Masters and other employees to assist in the presidential transition of Donald Trump in November 2016. Thiel and Masters were tasked with recommending appointees to fill positions in the Trump administration. According to Thiel biographer Max Chafkin, the list of 150 names the two men came up with included people "too extreme even for the most extreme members of Trump's inner circle."

In October 2019, Masters suggested he would launch a primary challenge against Republican U.S. Senator Martha McSally, expressing concern McSally was not a good candidate and criticizing her loss in the 2018 election, which Masters said was a "winnable" race. In January 2020, Masters said he would not run against McSally.

In March 2022, Masters resigned from his positions at Thiel's investment firm and foundation to campaign in the 2022 Arizona Senate race.

== 2022 U.S. Senate election ==
=== Campaign ===
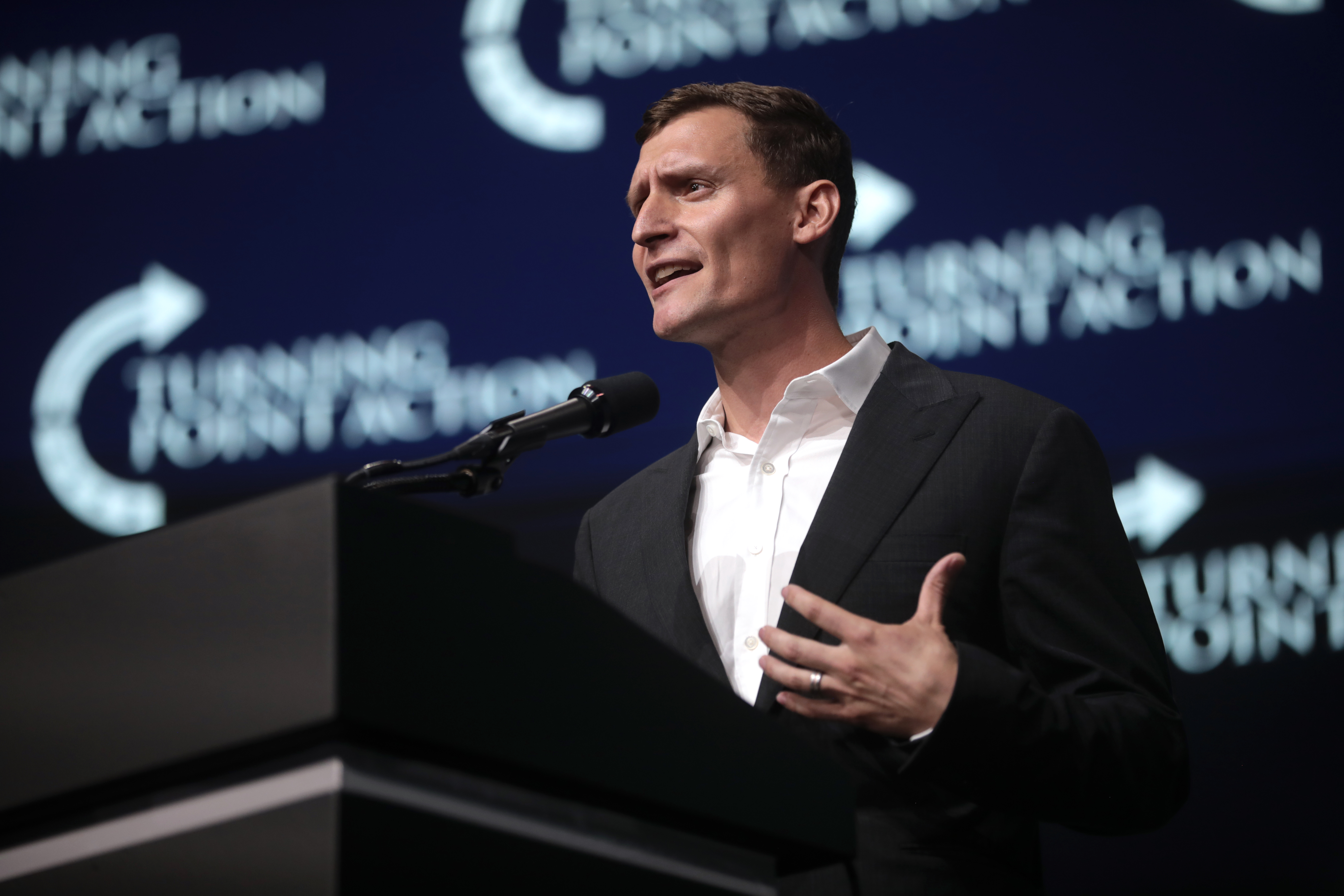
Masters speaking at the Rally to Protect Our Elections, hosted by Turning Point Action, 2021

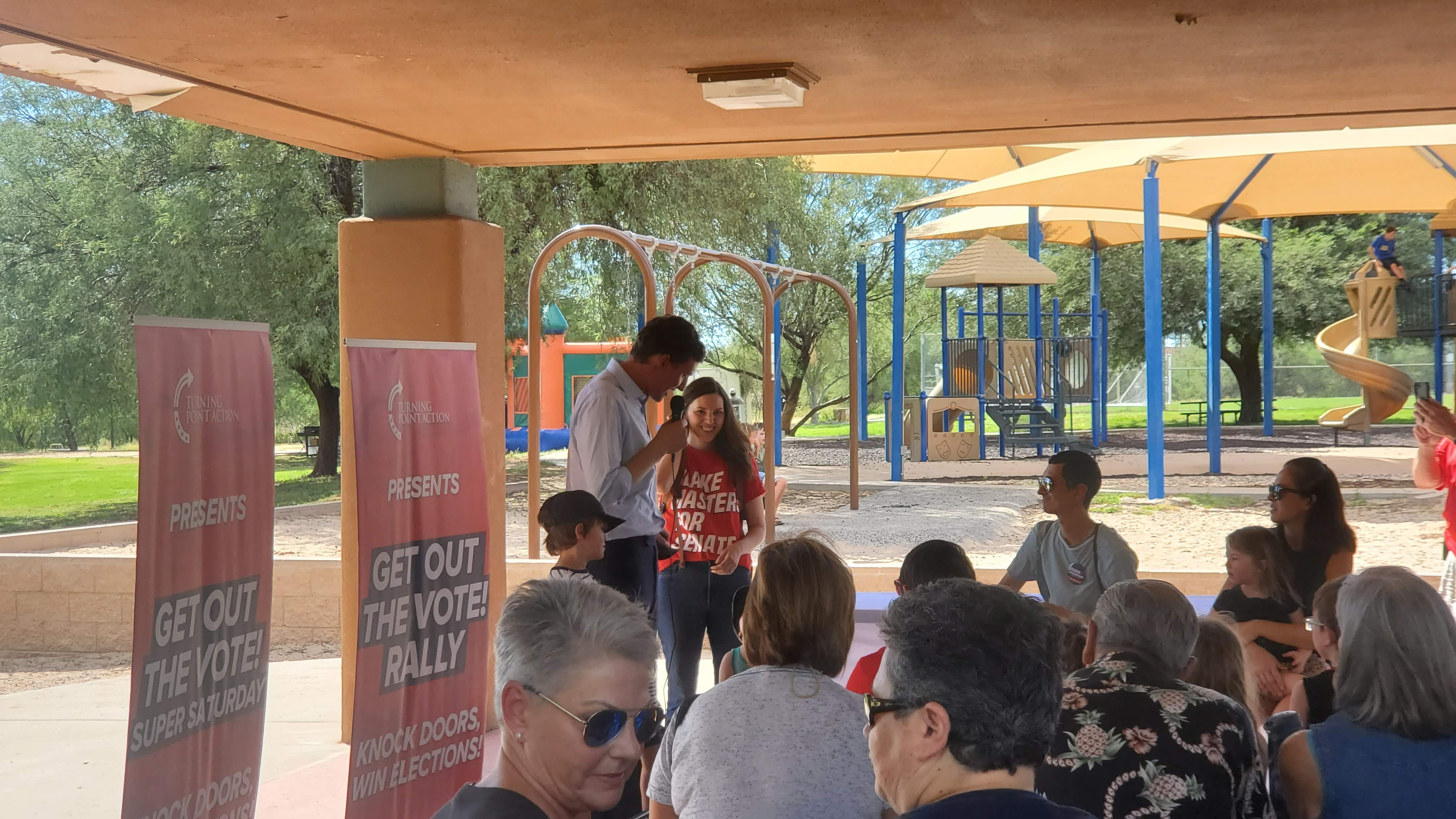
Masters introduces his wife at a campaign rally in Oro Valley, in September 2022.

Republican primary results by county Masters: 30–40%; 40–50%; Lamon: 30–40%

In April 2021, Masters reappeared as a potential candidate for the Republican nomination for U.S. Senate in 2022, challenging incumbent Democrat Mark Kelly. Peter Thiel spent $10 million to seed a new pro-Masters super PAC, "Saving Arizona PAC", to promote Masters's candidacy. Masters officially entered the race in July 2021, and Thiel gave an additional $3.5 million to the pro-Masters super PAC in May 2022.

In the Republican primary race, Masters faced state Attorney General Mark Brnovich, former Arizona National Guard Adjutant General Mick McGuire, Arizona Corporation Commissioner Justin Olson, and businessman Jim Lamon. The Republican primary campaign was characterized by high campaign spending and a wave of negative campaign advertisements.

During a Republican primary debate, Masters said that he supported impeaching President Joe Biden and removing him from office due to border enforcement issues.

Masters issued non-fungible tokens (NFTs) to fundraise for his campaign, announcing that the first 99 donors to contribute over $5,800 to his campaign would receive a limited edition NFT that would allow access to a private chat server and live events, as well as a copy of his book signed by himself and Thiel. Within the first 36 hours, Masters raised $575,000 for his campaign from selling NFTs.

During his campaign, Masters cited the book Beautiful Losers, a collection of white supremacist writer Sam Francis' essays, as an influence on his style of conservatism.

Masters won the Republican nomination in the August 2, 2022, primary with about 40% of the vote. Jim Lamon finished second and Mark Brnovich was third. Steven J. Law, the leader of a Republican-aligned super PAC, said that Masters "had scored the worst focus group results of any candidate he had ever seen," and cancelled all of its Arizona television advertisements supporting Masters to divert money to other races.

In the November 8, 2022 election, Masters was defeated by Kelly by a margin of 4.9%. Masters was the weakest-performing statewide Republican candidate in Arizona, receiving fewer votes than even controversial Secretary of State candidate Mark Finchem. Masters underperformed Donald Trump in Arizona in 2020 by 4.6%, despite 2022 being a more favorable year for Republicans. The Washington Post published an analysis by Aaron Blake calling him one of the "worst candidates of the 2022 election."

Masters later conceded the race to Kelly. After his election loss, Masters acknowledged Republicans needed to rethink the way they run campaigns.

=== Political views and statements ===
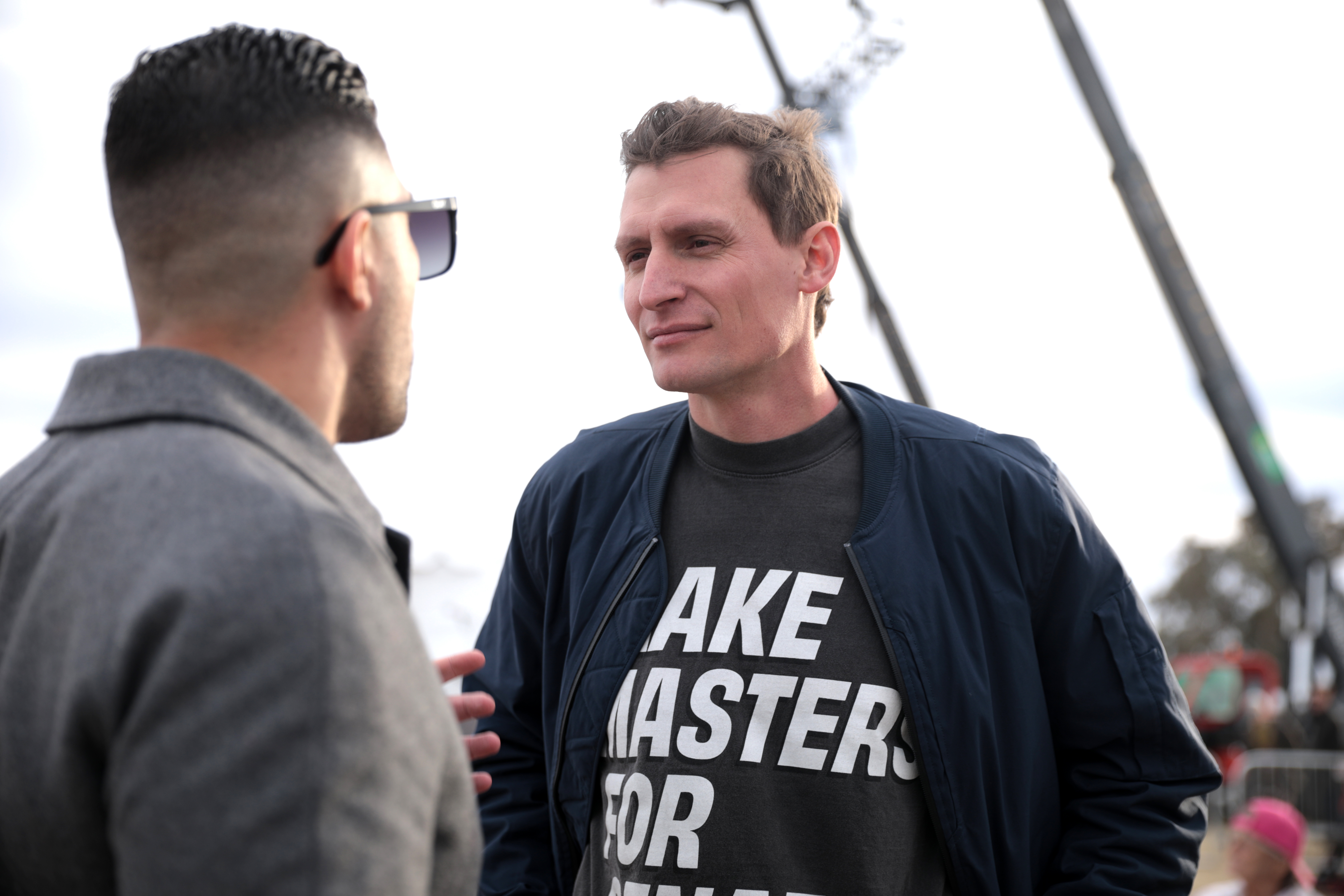
Masters at a Trump rally in Florence, Arizona, 2022

Politico described his 2022 campaign platform as "hard-line nationalist". During his 2022 Senate campaign, Masters invoked the Great Replacement conspiracy theory, saying that Democrats "hope to just change the demographics of our country... They hope to import an entirely new electorate." Masters considers himself "an America First conservative".

==== Abortion ====
Masters opposes abortion and has criticized Griswold v. Connecticut, the U.S. Supreme Court ruling that recognized a constitutional right to obtain contraceptives, although he has said that he does not want to outlaw contraception. Masters said that if elected to the Senate, he would vote to confirm federal judicial nominees only if they "understand that Roe and Griswold and Casey were wrongly decided".

In August 2022, following the Dobbs v. Jackson Women's Health Organization U.S. Supreme Court case that overruled Roe v. Wade, Masters "scrubbed" his campaign website and "softened his rhetoric" by "rewriting or erasing five of his six positions" on abortion including the removal of his "100% pro-life" text. His position, as of August 2022, is that he favors "a federal personhood law that would ban abortions nationwide after the beginning of the third trimester", unless the life of the mother is at risk.

==== Gun violence ====
While campaigning on a talk show, Masters said the "gun violence problem" was an issue, saying, "It's gangs. It's people in Chicago, St. Louis shooting each other. Very often, you know, black people, frankly. And the Democrats don't want to do anything about that."

==== Immigration ====
Masters believes in reducing the amount of legal immigration. He has asserted that Democrats want to deliberately engineer demographic replacement of American white people via immigration. In a campaign ad, he said, "We're going to end this invasion".

In a statement to the New York Times, Masters denied that he promotes the Great Replacement theory, saying that "It is obvious to everyone that Democrats see illegal immigrants as future voters. No 'theory' is needed to observe that."

==== False 2020 election claims ====
Masters has echoed Donald Trump's false claims that the 2020 presidential election was "stolen". In June 2021, Masters said that "it's really hard to know" the winner of the 2020 presidential election, and supported an audit of the vote in Maricopa County. In a November 2021 campaign ad, Masters stated he thought "Trump won in 2020". He appeared at a fundraiser with the former president at Mar-a-Lago shortly afterward. Trump endorsed his candidacy in June 2022.

In August 2022, CNN reported that Masters had removed text from his campaign website that "included the false claim that the 2020 election was stolen from former President Donald Trump, along with a section arguing the country would be better off if Trump was still the president."

==== Unabomber controversy ====
In March 2022, when Masters was asked by a podcast interviewer to name an "underrated subversive thinker", he named Ted Kaczynski. While clarifying that he did not endorse Kaczynski’s bombings, Masters said that Industrial Society and Its Future, the domestic terrorist’s manifesto, contained "a lot of [correct] insight". An Arizona-based GOP strategist told The Hill that the "Ted Kaczynski gaffe" was partly responsible for Masters' falling poll numbers.

==== Other issues ====
In August 2021, Masters called for new leadership in the U.S. Armed Forces due to perceived partisan leanings, saying "I would love to see all the generals get fired. You take the most conservative colonels, you promote them to general."

Masters opposes American aid to Ukraine.

Masters has suggested privatizing Social Security, but has opposed cuts and in August 2022 indicated support for increases to the program.

Meeting with conservative Tea Party activists in March 2022, Masters questioned whether the FBI was involved in the January 6 United States Capitol attack.

Although Masters has invested in several technology firms, he frequently criticizes Big Tech. He supported Elon Musk's proposed acquisition of Twitter, called for legislation to treat major social media companies as "common carriers" and to regulate Google's search algorithm.

Masters has called for a "federal Bitcoin reserve".

== 2024 U.S. House of Representatives campaign ==
In October 2023, Masters announced that he would run for the seat in Arizona's 8th congressional district in the U.S. House of Representatives in 2024, a few days after incumbent Debbie Lesko announced she would not run for re-election. Masters lost the Republican primary to Abe Hamadeh, coming in second.

Masters opined in July 2024: "Political leaders should have children. Certainly they should at least be married", so that they can "relate to a constituency of families, or govern wisely with respect to future generations"; Masters said this three months after criticizing his Republican primary rival Abe Hamadeh as a politician "we don't need" for having "no wife and kids, no skin in the game".

Donald Trump initially did not endorse Masters in the primary, instead supporting Hamadeh, an unsuccessful candidate for Arizona attorney general in 2022. Masters caused controversy during the 2024 campaign for referring to Hamadeh, who identifies his faith as both Druze and Muslim, as a "terrorist sympathizer." Masters' attack ads showed Hamadeh in Saudi Arabia, where he was stationed while serving in the U.S. Army. Trump later endorsed both Hamadeh and Masters in July, aligning with his running mate JD Vance's support for Masters.

== Personal life ==
Masters and his wife, Catherine Blanton, married in 2012. They have four sons. Masters is Catholic.

Party political offices
Preceded by Martha McSally	Republican nominee for U.S. Senator from Arizona (Class 3); 2022	Most recent
