= Arizona National Guard =

Component of the US military of the U.S. state of Arizona

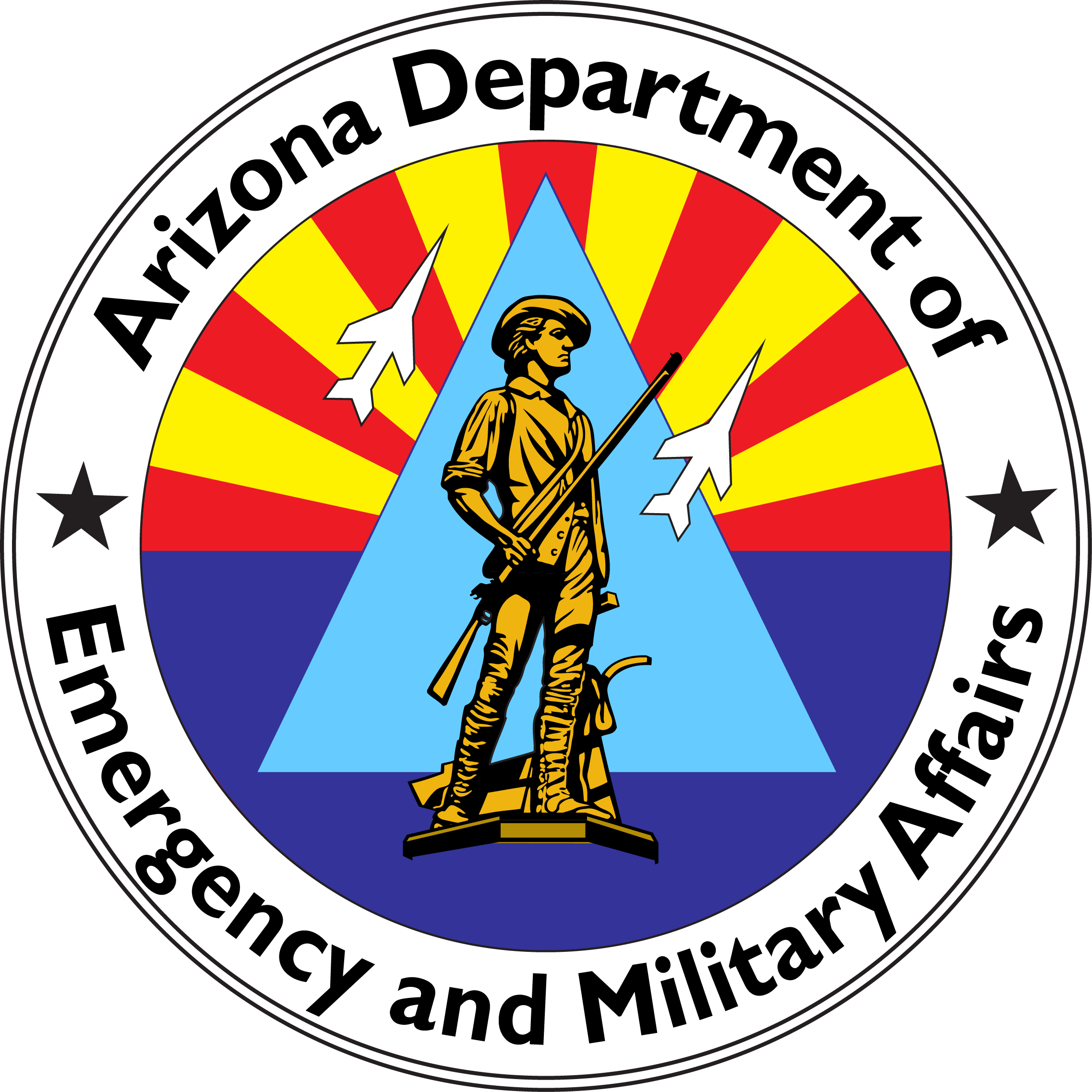
- Active: 1863–present
- Country: United States
- Allegiance: Arizona
- Branch: United States Army; United States Air Force
- Type: National Guard
- Role: Militia
- Part of: National Guard Bureau; Arizona Department of Emergency and Military Affairs
- Headquarters: Phoenix, AZ

Commanders
- Governor and Commander in Chief: Katie Hobbs
- Major general (United States): John A. Conley

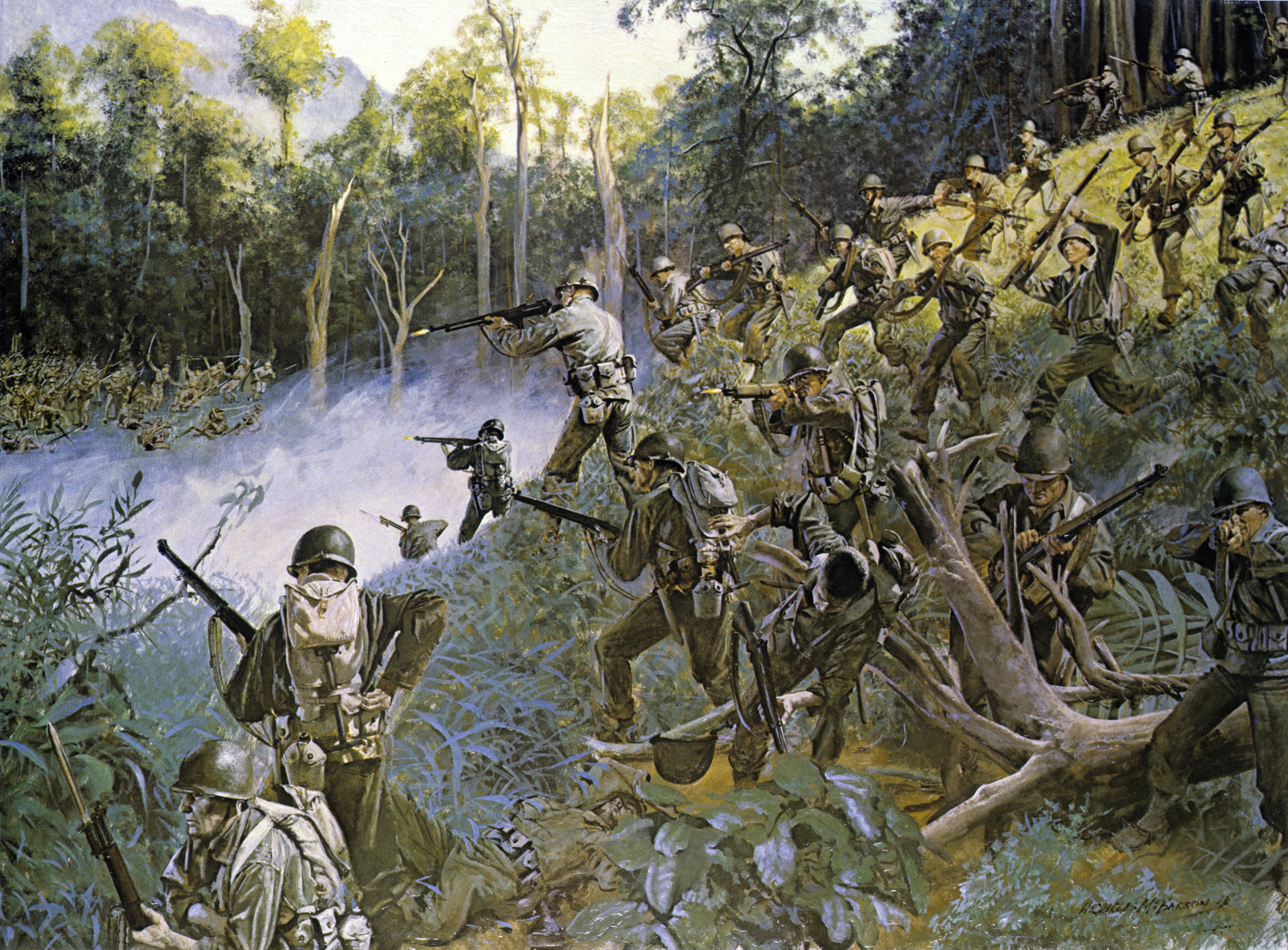
The 158th Infantry Regiment during the Philippines Campaign in 1945

The Arizona National Guard is the National Guard of the U.S. state of Arizona. It consists of the Arizona Army National Guard and the Arizona Air National Guard.

Both components are part of the Arizona Department of Emergency and Military Affairs. The Department of Emergency and Military Affairs (DEMA) consists of the Army and the Air National Guard, the Division of Emergency Management, and the Joint Programs Division. Until 2021, the department was headed by Major General Mick McGuire. The department is currently headed by Major General Kerry L. Muehlenbeck.

The Constitution of the United States specifically charges the United States National Guard with dual federal and state missions. Those missions range from limited actions during non-emergency situations to full scale law enforcement of martial law when local law enforcement officials can no longer maintain civil control. The National Guard may be called into federal service in response to a call by the president of the United States or United States Congress.

== Mission ==
When National Guard troops are called to federal service, the president serves as Commander-in-Chief. The federal mission assigned to the National Guard is "To provide properly trained and equipped units for prompt mobilization for war, National emergency or as otherwise needed."

The governor may call individuals or units of the Arizona National Guard into state service during emergencies or to assist in special situations which lend themselves to use of the National Guard. The state mission assigned to the National Guard is "To provide trained and disciplined forces for domestic emergencies or as otherwise provided by state law."

A state defense force (SDF) is a military entity authorized by both federal statute and executive order. The SDF is a state’s authorized militia and assumes a state's mission of the National Guard in the event the Guard is mobilized. The SDF comprises retired active and reserve military personnel and selected professional persons who volunteer their time and talents in further service to their state. Currently, Arizona does not have an active state defense force, but state law allows the organization of one if necessary.
