= 2026 Arizona elections =

A general election was held in the U.S. state of Arizona on November 3, 2026. Primary elections took place on July 21, 2026. The state-wide races in Arizona as well as the House races are expected to get significant attention due to its status as a battleground state. Arizona used to be a solid red state but had drifted into being a purple state by the 2020s, with Democrats holding both Senate seats and the governorship, in addition to Democrat Joe Biden winning the state in the 2020 presidential election. However, Republican Donald Trump won by a 5 point margin in 2024, showing his strongest performance out of the seven key swing states in that election, all of which he won. This is the first election cycle since 2014 that Arizona did not have a U.S. Senate election.

== United States House of Representatives ==
Arizona has nine seats in the United States House of Representatives, which are held by three Democrats and six Republicans.

In the last House election, Republicans won six seats, Democrats won three, with a total of 4 seats being decided by under 10 points in either direction.

== Governor ==
Incumbent Democratic Governor Katie Hobbs ran for re-election to a second term in 2026. Hobbs narrowly defeated Republican nominee Kari Lake in 2022 with 50.32% of the vote.

U.S. Representative Andy Biggs became the Republican nominee for Governor after defeating U.S. Representative David Schweikert in the Primary Election in July.

Hobbs defeated Biggs by 12.8%, receiving 55.7% of cast votes, with Biggs receiving 42.5%.

== Secretary of State ==
Incumbent Democratic Secretary of State Adrian Fontes has declared his intention to run for a second term in 2026. He won in 2022 with 52.38% of the vote, giving him the biggest margin of victory out of every statewide Arizona Democrat in 2022.

Arizona Representative Alexander Kolodin became the Republican nominee for the Secretary of State after defeating Gina Swoboda in the Primary Election in July.

== Attorney General ==
Incumbent Democratic attorney general Kris Mayes has declared her intention to run for a second term in 2026. She won in 2022 with 49.94% of the vote, making it the closest statewide race in Arizona in 2022.

Arizona Senate President Warren Petersen became the Republican nominee after defeating Rodney Glassman in the Primary Election in July.

== State Treasurer ==
Incumbent Republican state treasurer Kimberly Yee is term limited and can not seek re-election for a third term. She won in 2022 with 55.67% of the vote, the best state-wide Republican showing in Arizona.

Elijah Norton became the Republican nominee for Treasurer after defeating Katherine Hayley in the Primary Election in July.

Nick Mansour became the Democratic nominee for Treasurer after winning an uncontested Primary Election in July.

== Superintendent of Public Instruction ==
Incumbent Republican Tom Horne is eligible to run for re-election in 2026. He won a close election against then incumbent Democrat Kathy Hoffman in 2022, with 50.18% of the vote. However, incumbent State Treasurer Kimberly Yee has announced her intention to primary him for this position in 2026.

State Treasurer Kimberly Yee became the Republican nominee for Superintendent of Public Instruction after defeating Superintendent of Public Instruction Tom Horne in the Primary Election in July.

Teresa Leyba Ruiz became the Democratic nominee for Superintendent of Public Instruction after defeating Brett Matthew Newby in the Primary Election in July.

== State Mine Inspector ==
Incumbent Republican Les Presmyk was appointed by Katie Hobbs on September 15, 2025, after Paul Marsh resigned and has announced his intention to run for a full term in 2026. Marsh, who won a full term in 2022 with 98% against only a write-in Democratic candidate, had previously announced his intention to run for re-election in 2026.

Brian Matlock became the Democratic nominee for State Mine Inspector after winning an uncontested Primary Election in July.

== Corporation Commission ==
Incumbents Kevin Thompson and Nick Myers, both Republicans, are running for re-election.

Jonathon Hill, a nominee for the commission in 2024 and Clara Pratte, a former director at the U.S. Small Business Administration, were the Democratic nominees after an uncontested primary.

== State Legislature ==
All 90 seats in both chambers of the Arizona State Legislature are up for election in 2026. Republicans held small majorities in both chambers, with a 17-13 majority in the State Senate, and 33-27 in the State House. These chambers will be highly competitive and are being targeted by Democrats.

== Judicial ==
=== Supreme Court ===
Supreme Court chief justice John Lopez IV is up for a retention election in 2026. He was appointed by former Governor Doug Ducey in 2016 and has not stated his intention to run again.

=== Arizona Court of Appeals ===
Eight judges on Division 1 and six judges on Division 2 are up for a retention election in 2026.

Judge Anni Hill Foster was narrowly rejected by the voters after both Republican and Democratic aligned groups opposed her retention.

== Ballot propositions ==
Eight ballot propositions appeared before voters of Arizona in 2026.

2026 Arizona ballot propositions
No.	Description	Type	Votes			
No.	Description	Type	Yes	%	No	%
141	Would prohibit the government from imposing taxes or fees based on vehicle miles traveled and from enacting rules to monitor or limit vehicle miles traveled without the person’s consent	Legislatively referred constitutional amendment	1,231,073	50.99%	1,183,097	49.01%
142	Would prohibit the government from requiring an individual to endorse preferential treatment toward or discrimination against an individual on the basis of race or ethnicity	Legislatively referred constitutional amendment	972,076	40.08%	1,453,449	59.92%
144	Would make a number of changes to the state's election laws, including specifying that only citizens may vote in any Arizona election and requiring voters to show a government-issued ID to cast a ballot	Legislatively referred constitutional amendment	1,149,112	46.70%	1,311,576	53.30%
316	Would prohibit local government from imposing or increasing a tax on the sale of food items without voter approval and cap the tax rate at 2%	Legislatively referred state statute	1,514,978	62.05%	926,703	37.95%
317	Would declare drug cartels to be terrorist organizations	Legislatively referred state statute	1,388,426	56.86%	1,061,281	43.32%
318	Would prohibit schools and athletic associations from allowing a student, athlete, employee, or other individual from using a restroom, locker room, shower room, or other private space that is not designated for their sex	Legislatively referred state statute	1,443,349	58.74%	1,013,816	41.26%
319	Would prohibit the government from using traffic photo enforcement systems without voter approval	Legislatively referred state statute	1,524,279	62.38%	919,088	37.62%
320	Would require certain school districts to spend at least 60% of their budget on direct instructional expenses	Legislatively referred state statute	1,156,811	48.12%	1,247,165	51.88%
Source: Arizona Secretary of State

Results by county

Proposition 141 results by county
No:
- 50–60%
Yes:
- 60–70%
- 50–60%

Proposition 142 results by county
No:
- 60–70%
- 50–60%
Yes:
- 50–60%

Proposition 144 results by county
No:
- 60–70%
- 50–60%
Yes:
- 70–80%
- 60–70%
- 50–60%

Proposition 316 results by county
No:
- 50–60%
Yes:
- 70–80%
- 60–70%
- 50–60%

Proposition 317 results by county
No:
- 50–60%
Yes:
- 70–80%
- 60–70%
- 50–60%

Proposition 318 results by county
No:
- 50–60%
Yes:
- >80%
- 70–80%
- 60–70%
- 50–60%

Proposition 319 results by county
Yes:
- 60–70%
- 50–60%

Proposition 320 results by county
No:
- 60–70%
- 50–60%
Yes:
- 60–70%
- 50–60%
