= 2024 in Arizona =

- Decades: 2000s; 2010s; 2020s
- See also: History of Arizona; Historical outline of Arizona; List of years in Arizona; 2024 in the United States

The following is a list of events of the year 2024 in Arizona.

== Incumbents ==
=== State government ===
- Governor: Katie Hobbs (D)
- Secretary of State: Adrian Fontes
- Attorney General: Kris Mayes
- State Treasurer: Kimberly Yee (R)
- Superintendent of Public Instruction: Tom Horne (R)
- State Mine Inspector: Paul Marsh
- Corporation Commissioners:
  - Lea Márquez Peterson
  - Jim O’Connor
  - Anna Tovar
  - Nick Myers
  - Kevin Thompson

== Events ==
- January 15 – Four people are killed and another person is injured in a hot air balloon crash in Eloy.
- January 24 – The chair of the Arizona Republican Party Jeff DeWit resigns after a tape recording of DeWit attempting to bribe Kari Lake into stepping down from the United States Senate race is leaked.
- March 19 –
  - The Democratic Party holds presidential nominating contests in Arizona.
  - The Republican Party holds presidential nominating contests in Arizona.
- April 4 – Researchers at the Dark Energy Spectroscopic Instrument release the largest 3D map of the universe featuring more than six million galaxies. Using this map, researchers are able to measure the acceleration of the expansion rate of the universe with unprecedented accuracy, detecting hints that the rate of expansion has been increasing over time.
- April 9 – The Arizona Supreme Court upholds a law criminalizing most types of abortions in the case Planned Parenthood Arizona v. Mayes.
- April 27 – Police arrest 72 pro-Palestinian protesters at Arizona State University.
- April 30 – Police arrest 24 pro-Palestinian protesters at Northern Arizona University
- June 21 – At least six people die due to heat-related illness in the Phoenix metropolitan area, as temperatures reach 115 °F (46 °C).
- July 6 – Maricopa County investigates over 160 suspected heat-related deaths related to ongoing heat waves.
- November 5 – A Honda HA-420 Hondajet plane crashed through a perimeter fence and hit a car while aborting takeoff at the Falcon Field airport in Mesa. Four of the five people on board the plane and the driver of the vehicle were killed.

== See also ==
- 2024 in the United States
