= 2023 in Arizona =

- Decades: 2000s; 2010s; 2020s
- See also: History of Arizona; Historical outline of Arizona; List of years in Arizona; 2023 in the United States

The following is a list of events of the year 2023 in Arizona.

== Incumbents ==
=== State government ===
- Governor: Doug Ducey (R) (until January 2), Katie Hobbs (D) (since January 2)
- Secretary of State: Katie Hobbs (D) (until January 2), Adrian Fontes (since January 2)
- Attorney General: Mark Brnovich (R) (until January 2), Kris Mayes (since January 2)
- State Treasurer: Kimberly Yee (R)
- Superintendent of Public Instruction: Kathy Hoffman (D) (until January 2), Tom Horne (R) (since January 2)
- State Mine Inspector: Paul Marsh
- Corporation Commissioners:
  - Lea Márquez Peterson
  - Jim O’Connor
  - Anna Tovar
  - Nick Myers (since January 3)
  - Kevin Thompson (since January 3)

== Events ==
- January 2 – Katie Hobbs (b. 1969) is inaugurated as the 24th Governor of Arizona after narrowly winning the 2022 gubernatorial election against her Republican challenger, former KSAZ-TV news anchor Kari Lake (b. 1969) by 0.69%
- June 10 – Two people are killed after a small plane crashes in the Superstition Mountains.
- August 1 – One person is killed and 56 others are injured after a tour bus rolls over in Grand Canyon West.
- August 11 – Governor Katie Hobbs declares a state of emergency amidst the heat waves in the state.
- October 24 – The Arizona Diamondbacks defeat the Philadelphia Phillies, 4–2 in game 7, to win the National League pennant.

== See also ==
- 2023 in the United States
