= 2025 in Arizona =

- Decades: 2000s; 2010s; 2020s
- See also: History of Arizona; Historical outline of Arizona; List of years in Arizona; 2025 in the United States

The following is a list of events of the year 2025 in Arizona.

== Incumbents ==
=== State government ===
- Governor: Katie Hobbs (D)
- Secretary of State: Adrian Fontes
- Attorney General: Kris Mayes
- State Treasurer: Kimberly Yee (R)
- Superintendent of Public Instruction: Tom Horne (R)
- State Mine Inspector: Paul Marsh
- Corporation Commissioners:
  - Lea Márquez Peterson
  - Jim O’Connor (until January 6), Rene Lopez (since January 6)
  - Anna Tovar (until January 6), Rachel Waldon (since January 6)
  - Nick Myers
  - Kevin Thompson

== Events ==
- February 10 – One person dies when a Learjet 35A aircraft veers off the runway and crashes into a Gulfstream G200 aircraft at Scottsdale Airport in Scottsdale.
- March 9 – The 2025 Shriners Children's 500 occurs at Phoenix Raceway in Avondale with Christopher Bell winning the race, Denny Hamlin finishing 2nd, and Kyle Larson finishing in 3rd.
- May 4 – Three people die and five are injured in a shooting at a restaurant in Glendale.
- June 9 – 2025 Southwest United States measles outbreak: The Arizona Department of Public Health confirms the state's first measles case of 2025.
- July 11 – Health officials announce a Coconino County resident died from bubonic plague, the first recorded death in the United States since 2007.
- July 13 – A wildfire destroys the Grand Canyon Lodge on the North Rim of the Grand Canyon.
- August 5 – Four medical personnel die when a plane crashes while attempting to land in Chinle on the Navajo Nation.
- September 23 – Adelita Grijalva wins the Arizona's 7th congressional district special election, succeeding her late father Raúl Grijalva. She is not sworn in until November.
- September 25 – Serial killer Cleophus Cooksey Jr. is convicted of eight murders in the Phoenix metropolitan area in 2017, including those of his mother and step-father.
- September 26 – Four people are killed by flash floods, three in Globe and one in Scottsdale.
- October 29 – ICE agents shoot a man on Interstate 17 in Phoenix.
- November 12 – Adelita Grijalva is sworn in.

== See also ==
- 2025 in the United States
