= 2026 Arizona State Mine Inspector election =

- November 3, 2026
- Reporting: 88% as of 8:42 AM MST
Nominee	Brian Matlock	Les Presmyk
Party	Democratic	Republican
Popular vote	1,213,145	1,097,759
Percentage	52.50%	47.50%
- Matlock: 50–60% 60–70% 70–80% Presmyk: 50–60% 60–70% 70–80%
State Mine Inspector before election
Les Presmyk
Republican
Elected State Mine Inspector
Brian Matlock
Democratic

The 2026 Arizona State Mine Inspector election was held on November 3, 2026, to elect the Arizona State Mine Inspector. Primary elections were held on July 21. Incumbent Republican Les Presmyk was appointed by Katie Hobbs on September 15, 2025, after Paul Marsh resigned and announced his intention to run for a full term in 2026. Marsh, who won a full term in 2022 with 98% against only a write-in Democratic candidate, had previously announced his intention to run for re-election in 2026.

== Republican primary ==
=== Candidates ===
==== Nominee ====
- Les Presmyk, incumbent state mine inspector

=== Results ===
Republican primary results
Party	Candidate	Votes	%
Republican	Les Presmyk (incumbent)	525,347	100.0
Total votes		525,347	100.0

== Democratic primary ==
=== Candidates ===
==== Nominee ====
- Brian Matlock, mechanical engineer

=== Results ===
Democratic primary results
Party	Candidate	Votes	%
Democratic	Brian Matlock	479,933	100.0
Total votes		479,933	100.0

== General election ==
=== Results ===
2026 Arizona State Mine Inspector election
Party	Candidate	Votes	%	±%
Republican	Les Presmyk (incumbent)			
Democratic	Brian Matlock			
Total votes			100.0%	
