= Joe Hart (politician) =

American politician (1944–2022)

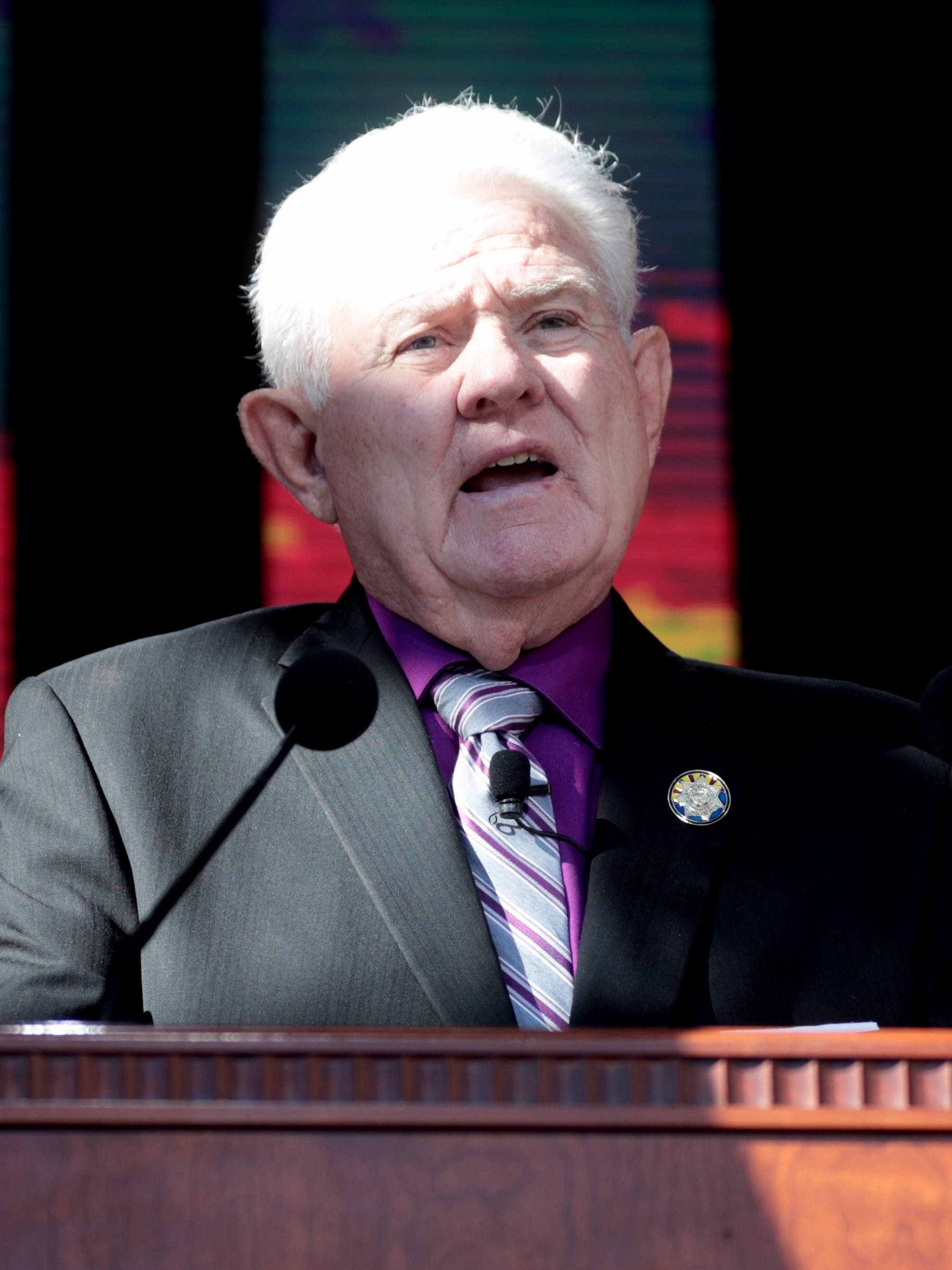
- Hart in 2019

11th Mine Inspector of Arizona
- In office January 1, 2007 – October 29, 2021
- Governor: Janet Napolitano; Jan Brewer; Doug Ducey
- Preceded by: Doug Martin
- Succeeded by: Paul Marsh

Member of the Arizona House of Representatives from the 2nd district
- In office January 10, 1992 – January 14, 2001 Serving with John Verkamp

Personal details
- Born: May 8, 1944 Kingman, Arizona, U.S.
- Died: September 11, 2022 (aged 78)
- Party: Republican
- Education: Fullerton College; Mohave Community College

Joe Hart (May 8, 1944 – September 11, 2022) was an American politician who served as the 11th State Mine Inspector of Arizona (2007–2021) and as a Member of the Arizona House of Representatives representing Arizona's 2nd Legislative District (1992–2001). He was a member of the Republican Party.

== Education and career ==
Hart attended Fullerton Junior College and Mohave Community College.

Hart previously worked for the Black Mountain Cattle Company, as the Safety Inspector for the Duval Mining Corporation (then owner of the Mineral Park mine) and at Hart to Hart Trucking. He was also the owner of radio stations KGMN, KZKE, and KYET, and television station KKAX-LD.

== Legal issues ==
In 2017, Hart was arrested on suspicion of domestic violence following a physical altercation with his 59 year old nephew. The fight was instigated by a disagreement over repairs to a water pipe. This charge was later dismissed by the Kingman city attorney.

== Electoral history ==
Arizona State Mine Inspector Election, 2018
Party	Candidate	Votes	%
Republican	Joe Hart (inc.)	1,168,798	51.7
Democratic	William Pierce	1,090,346	48.3

Arizona State Mine Inspector Election, 2014
Party	Candidate	Votes	%
Republican	Joe Hart (inc.)	1,050,509	100.0

Arizona State Mine Inspector Election, 2010
Party	Candidate	Votes	%
Republican	Joe Hart (inc.)	916,046	57.1
Democratic	Manuel Cruz	687,310	42.9

Arizona State Mine Inspector Election, 2006
Party	Candidate	Votes	%
Republican	Joe Hart	1,057,097	100.0

State Mine Inspector – 2006 Republican Primary
Candidate	Votes	%
Joe Hart	127,800	50.6
Larry Nelson	124,778	49.4

Arizona House of Representatives District 2 Election, 1998
Party	Candidate	Votes	%
Republican	John Verkamp (inc.)	23,375	40.7
Republican	Joe Hart (inc.)	18,144	31.6
Democratic	Richard "Cowboy" Swanson	15,903	27.7

Arizona House of Representatives District 2 Election, 1996
Party	Candidate	Votes	%
Republican	John Verkamp (inc.)	35,953	42.3
Republican	Joe Hart (inc.)	31,979	37.6
Libertarian	John Williams	8,853	10.4
Libertarian	Sunny Reid	8,280	9.7

Arizona House of Representatives District 2 Republican Primary Election, 1996
Party	Candidate	Votes	%
Republican	John Verkamp (inc.)	7,900	45.7
Republican	Joe Hart (inc.)	6,864	39.7
Republican	Timothy Webb	2,507	14.5

Arizona House of Representatives District 2 Election, 1994
Party	Candidate	Votes	%
Republican	John Verkamp (inc.)	24,771	39.7
Republican	Joe Hart (inc.)	19,989	32.0
Democratic	Florence Karlstrom	17,644	28.3

Arizona House of Representatives District 2 Republican Primary Election, 1994
Party	Candidate	Votes	%
Republican	John Verkamp (inc.)	6,188	36.4
Republican	Joe Hart (inc.)	6,010	35.3
Republican	Barbara Miller	4,818	28.3

Arizona House of Representatives District 2 Election, 1992
Party	Candidate	Votes	%
Republican	John Verkamp (inc.)	26,738	28.5
Republican	Joe Hart	19,696	21.0
Democratic	Ginger Engen	19,015	20.2
Democratic	Joe Lingerfelt	18,201	19.4
Independent Republican	Ben Benton	5,532	5.9
Libertarian	Clifford "Sunny" Reid, Jr.	2,430	2.6
Libertarian	Eric Boudette	2,345	2.5

Political offices
Preceded by Doug Martin	Mine Inspector of Arizona; 2007–2021	Succeeded by Paul Marsh
