= KZKE =

Radio station in Seligman, Arizona

- Seligman, Arizona; United States
- Frequency: 103.3 MHz
- Branding: KZKE Good Time Oldies

Programming
- Format: Oldies

Ownership
- Owner: Route 66 Broadcasting, LLC
- Sister stations: KGMN KYET

History
- Former call signs: KJJJ (1995–1991)

Technical information
- Licensing authority: FCC
- Facility ID: 56339
- Class: C3
- ERP: 7,700 watts
- HAAT: 138.1 meters (453 ft)
- Transmitter coordinates: 35°19′26″N 112°45′55″W
- Translator: 95.1 K236BH (Kingman)

Links
- Public license information: Public file; LMS

KZKE (103.3 FM) is a radio station broadcasting an Oldies format. Licensed to Seligman, Arizona, United States, the station is currently owned by Route 66 Broadcasting, L.L.C., owned by Arizona State Mine Inspector Joe Hart and his wife Rhonda.

== History ==
The station was assigned the call letters KZKE on 1991-10-18. On 1995-12-15, the station changed its call sign to KJJJ, then again on 1997-08-11, to the current KZKE.

== Translator ==
The station is also heard in Kingman, Arizona, through a translator on 95.1 FM.

Call sign	Frequency	City of license	FID	ERP (W)	HAAT	Class	FCC info
K236BH	95.1 FM	Kingman, Arizona	71156	10	873 m (2,864 ft)	D	LMS
