= KYET =

Radio station in Golden Valley, Arizona

- Golden Valley, Arizona; United States
- Broadcast area: Kingman, Arizona; Mohave County
- Frequencies: 1170 kHz C-QUAM AM stereo 92.3 MHz FM
- Branding: Cactus Country

Programming
- Format: Classic Country

Ownership
- Owner: Grand Canyon Gateway Broadcasting, LLC
- Sister stations: KGMN KZKE

History
- First air date: September 1977
- Former call signs: KBWA (1977–1983); KDAN (1983–1991)
- Former frequencies: 1180 kHz (1977–2012)

Technical information
- Licensing authority: FCC
- Facility ID: 64357
- Class: D
- Power: 6,000 watts day 1 watt night
- Transmitter coordinates: 35°12′47″N 114°06′52.8″W

Links
- Public license information: Public file; LMS
- Webcast: Listen Live
- Website: KYET website

KYET (1170 AM) is a radio station broadcasting a Classic Country format. Licensed to Golden Valley, Arizona, United States, it serves the Mohave County area. The station is currently owned by Grand Canyon Gateway Broadcasting, LLC, owned by Arizona State Mine Inspector Joe Hart and his wife Rhonda. KYET transmits a stereophonic multiplex signal in the C-QUAM standard.

== History ==
The station went on the air on 1180 kHz as KBWA in 1977. On August 12, 1991, the station changed its call sign to the current KYET. Previously, this call-sign, KYET, had been assigned to a 500-watt AM radio station with its transmitter in Payette, Idaho, and the studios in Ontario, Oregon.

The station fell silent in 2000 due to leasing issues with the City of Williams, Arizona. After a lengthy battle with permitting and unable to find suitable land for erecting a tower, the decision was made to change the city of license to Golden Valley, Arizona as its first aural service. Full-time operations resumed on October 16, 2012.

On Sunday, September 4, 2022, popular vintage electronics YouTuber Shango066 released a video giving a station tour of KYET. The station engineer, Matt, explains how the AM stereo transmitter functions, as well as other details of the exciter and transmission system.
