= Abraham Hamadeh =

American politician and prosecutor (born 1991)

Abe Hamadeh
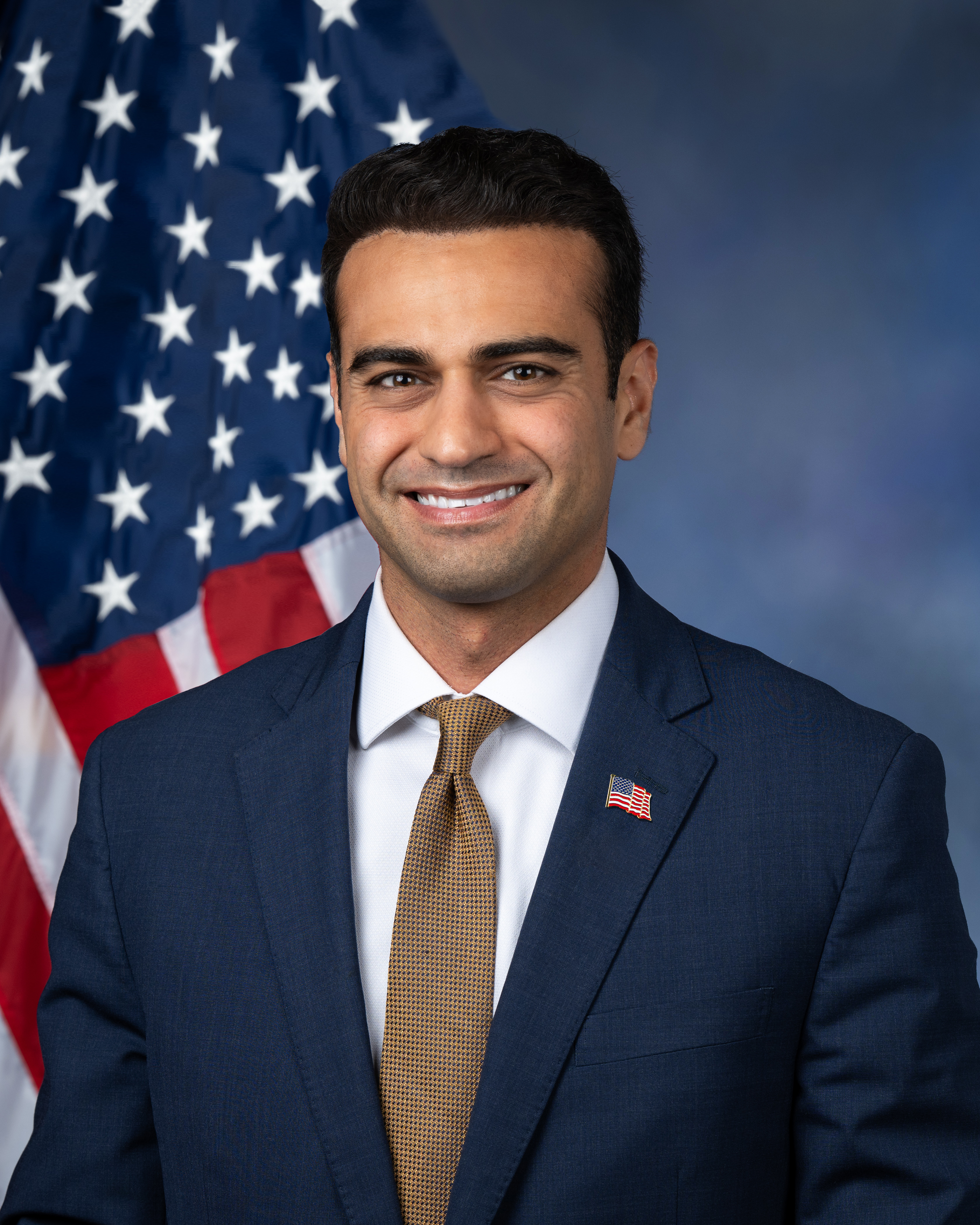
- Official portrait, 2025

Member of the U.S. House of Representatives from Arizona's 8th district
- Incumbent
- Assumed office January 3, 2025
- Preceded by: Debbie Lesko

Personal details
- Born: Abraham Jamal Hamadeh; May 15, 1991 (age 35) Chicago, Illinois, U.S.
- Party: Republican
- Education: Arizona State University (BA); University of Arizona (JD)
- Website: House website Campaign website

Military service
- Allegiance: United States
- Branch/service: United States Army; Army Reserve
- Years of service: 2016–present
- Rank: Captain
- Unit: Military Intelligence Corps
- Awards: Meritorious Service Medal

Abraham Jamal Hamadeh (born May 15, 1991) is an American politician, attorney, U.S. Army intelligence officer, and former prosecutor currently serving as the U.S representative for Arizona's 8th congressional district since 2025. A member of the Republican Party, he is the first Arab American elected to Congress from Arizona.

Born into a Syrian immigrant family in Chicago and raised in Phoenix, Hamadeh graduated with a bachelor's degree from Arizona State University and earned his Juris Doctor degree from the University of Arizona. After joining the United States Army as an intelligence officer in 2016, Hamadeh began his legal career as a prosecutor in the Tucson City Prosecutor's Office and later in the Maricopa County Attorney's Office before being deployed to Saudi Arabia in 2020. In 2022, Hamadeh was the Republican nominee for Arizona attorney general, losing to Democratic nominee Kris Mayes by 280 votes.

Hamadeh was elected to Congress in 2024, defeating Democratic nominee Greg Whitten after winning a crowded Republican primary.

== Early life and education ==
Hamadeh was born in Chicago, Illinois, and later moved to Phoenix, Arizona. He is the youngest child in a family of Syrian immigrants and grew up in a mixed-faith household, with a Muslim father and a Druze mother. He is also Kurdish on his paternal grandmother's side.

Hamadeh attended Arizona State University for his undergraduate degree and later earned his Juris Doctor from the James E. Rogers College of Law at the University of Arizona. While attending law school, the Arizona Prosecuting Attorneys' Advisory Council awarded Hamadeh the Udall Fellowship.

== Military service ==
Hamadeh has served in the U.S. Army Reserve as an intelligence officer since 2016, attaining the rank of captain. He was deployed to Saudi Arabia in 2020. He trained members of the Saudi armed forces for 14 months before returning to the U.S. in 2021, receiving a Meritorious Service Medal for his service.

== Legal career ==
Hamadeh's first legal role was as an unpaid intern in the office of the Tucson City Prosecutor. In 2016, Hamadeh received a Juris Doctor from the University of Arizona College of Law. He passed the Arizona Bar Exam in 2016, and two months later began working in the Maricopa County Attorney's Office as a prosecutor. According to the Arizona Republic, Hamadeh prosecuted at least six trials while a county prosecutor. He resigned from this role in September 2021, citing his intent to focus on his political campaign and his absence from the office following his military deployment in July 2020.

== 2022 attorney general campaign ==
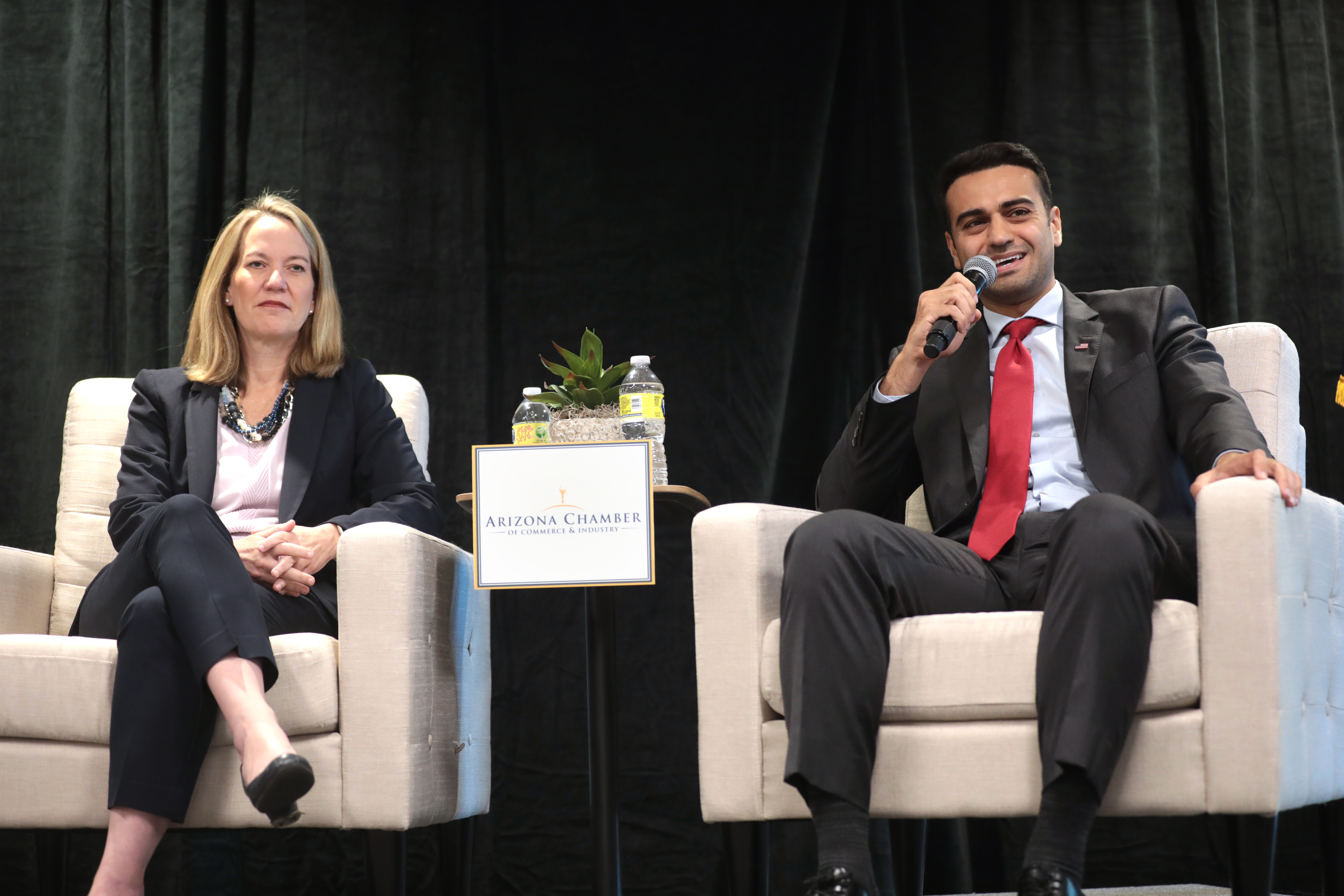
Hamadeh with Kris Mayes at a candidate forum in September 2022.

Hamadeh's political career began in November 2021, when he launched his campaign for attorney general of Arizona. His primary campaign issue was election security, as he spoke out in support of claims that the 2020 presidential election was stolen through means of widespread electoral fraud, which former president Donald Trump and his allies had promoted following his loss to president Joe Biden. Other issues he ran on included the enforcement of state border laws, support for law enforcement, and opposition to censorship by technology corporations. Within the first week of his candidacy, Hamadeh's campaign announced that he had raised over $100,000. He received Trump's endorsement in June 2022 and won the Republican primary election in August, defeating former city councilor Rodney Glassman and former state supreme court justice Andrew Gould.

In the general election, Hamadeh faced Democratic Party nominee Kris Mayes, a law professor and former chair of the Arizona Corporation Commission. The election was considered a tossup by forecasters, citing each candidate's tight leads in polling as well as Arizona's status as a swing state due to recent Democratic victories in statewide races. On election day, November 8, there was no clear winner, as Mayes held a lead of a few thousand votes over Hamadeh while ballots continued to be counted. When the final tally was completed on November 21, Mayes led Hamadeh by 510 votes out of 2.5 million cast in the closest attorney general race of the year. Because the margin of victory fell below 0.5% of the total vote, an automatic recount was triggered under state law, beginning on December 5. On December 29, judge Timothy Thomason of the Maricopa County Superior Court announced Mayes as the winner of the election with a reduced margin of 280 votes, making it one of the closest elections in the history of Arizona. She would take office only four days later, on January 2.

=== Legal challenges ===
Hamadeh made his first attempt to challenge the results of the election after the final tally was completed, although his case was dismissed by Judge Randall Warner due to a state law that requires election challenges to be filed after the certification of results. He filed a second lawsuit following the certification on December 5, arguing that misconduct by election workers, including misinterpretation of undervotes, had cost him the election. However, only 14 ballots were submitted for evidence, which Judge Lee Jantzen noted had only demonstrated errors on the part of the voters, not election officials. Jantzen ultimately denied the election challenge in a preliminary hearing on December 23, 2022, stating in his closing remarks that "there isn't enough information" that any illegal activity had taken place.

In his third lawsuit filed after Mayes had been sworn in, Hamadeh argued that 1,100 provisional ballots had gone uncounted. This claim had come after election officials uncovered 507 votes in Pinal County that were left uncounted, largely due to human error. Judge Jantzen rejected this lawsuit in July 2023, finding that there was no new evidence that could not have been previously produced at the original trial. When Hamadeh requested for the Arizona Supreme Court to intervene, they declined and instead sanctioned him, including an order to pay $55,000 toward the legal fees of Mayes and Adrian Fontes, the newly elected Arizona secretary of state. In April 2024, the Arizona Court of Appeals had dismissed Hamadeh's request for a new trial in a split decision, criticizing his failure to swiftly move the case forward. In December 2024, the Arizona Supreme Court rejected Hamadeh's appeal, ending this lawsuit.

In November 2023, Hamadeh initiated another lawsuit against the 2022 election result by claiming that the 2022 election violated his constitutional rights; this lawsuit was rejected in July 2024 by Judge Scott Blaney of the Maricopa County Superior Court, who ruled that Hamadeh filed the lawsuit too late, because it was filed seven months after a report was published on the 2022 election's ballot issues, instead of within a five-day limit for an election challenge.

In a different lawsuit, Hamadeh raised the issue of Maricopa County's counting of early ballots in the 2022 election, then concluded that he should be appointed as attorney general as he was "personally entitled" to the role; a rejection of this lawsuit was published in April 2024 by Judge Susanna Pineda of the Maricopa County Superior Court, with Pineda ruling that Hamadeh's challenge should have been brought before the election, and further stating that Hamadeh "surmises, without proof, that he received the most ‘legal votes’" in the election. In October 2024, the Arizona Court of Appeals rejected Hamadeh's appeal of Pineda's ruling, agreeing that Hamadeh had filed the lawsuit too late, but the Arizona Court of Appeals rescinded Pineda's order for Hamadeh to be sanctioned to pay his opponents' legal fees.

== U.S. House of Representatives ==
=== Election ===
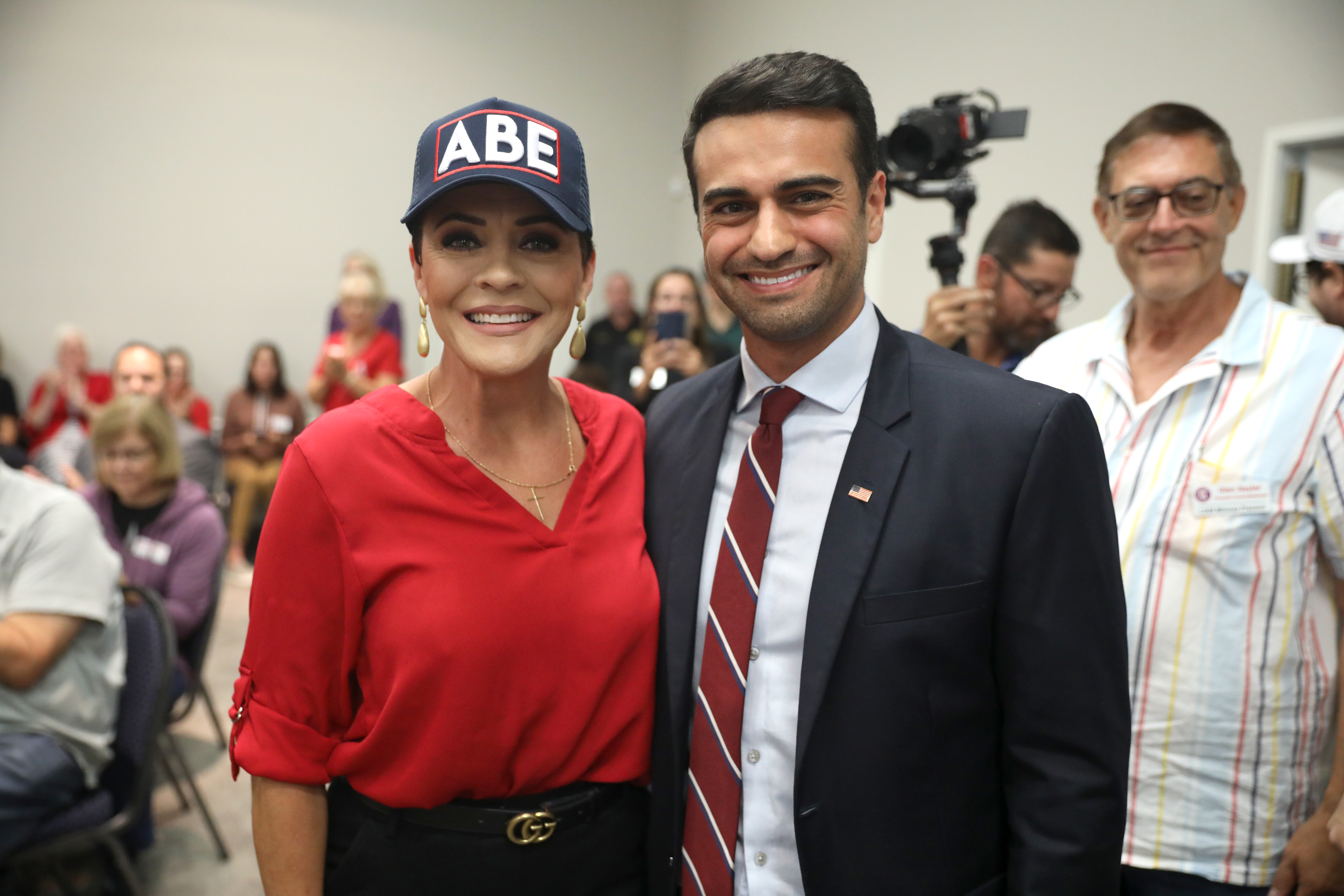
Hamadeh with Kari Lake at a campaign rally in November 2023.

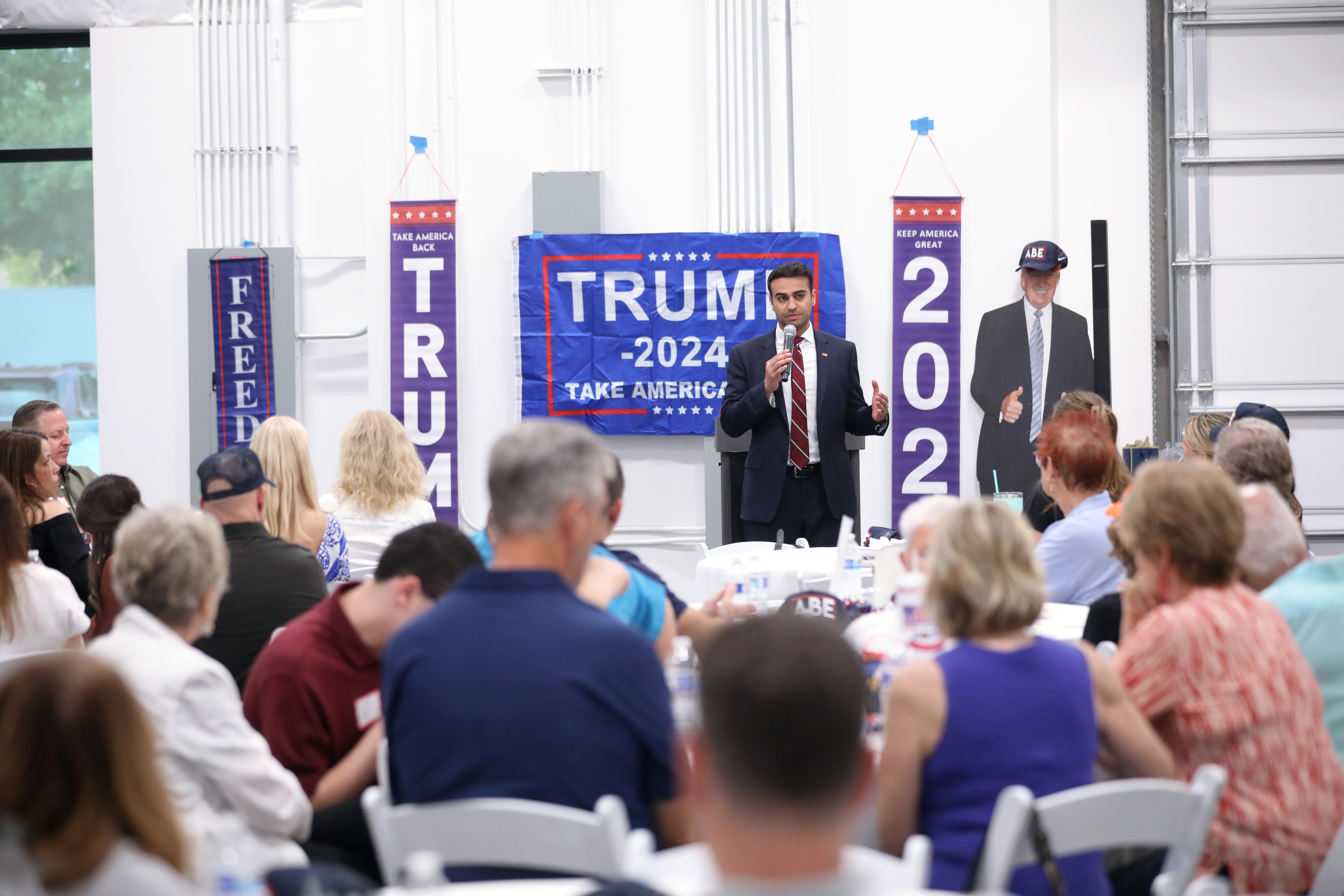
Hamadeh speaking with supporters at a rally celebrating his primary victory.

Hamadeh announced his campaign for Arizona's 8th congressional district in October 2023, shortly after incumbent representative Debbie Lesko announced her retirement from the seat. Hamadeh's campaign garnered significant support from notable Republican politicians, including former president Donald Trump and former news anchor and political candidate Kari Lake. The Republican primary attracted a field of prominent candidates, including venture capitalist Blake Masters, who lost the 2022 U.S. Senate election against incumbent Democrat Mark Kelly, along with former congressman Trent Franks and state legislators Anthony Kern and Ben Toma.

Polls leading up to the election showed both Hamadeh and Masters with small leads over each other, and the two were seen as the frontrunners, despite Masters massively outspending Hamadeh with his personal funds. The primary campaign was described as "nasty", with the Masters campaign deeming Hamadeh as a "terrorist sympathizer" by negatively highlighting his Muslim heritage. Masters incurred backlash for using Islamophobic rhetoric and imagery in campaign ads. Hamadeh's campaign responded by stating that he "embodies the same Judeo-Christian values that our nation was built upon."

Two days before the primary election, despite endorsing Hamadeh the year before, Trump published a statement making a dual endorsement for both him and Masters. Hamadeh won the Republican primary with just under 30% of the vote to Masters's 26%. Because of the district's strong Republican leaning, he was favored to win the November general election against Democrat Greg Whitten, and would go on to defeat Whitten with 56.5% of the vote.

=== Tenure ===
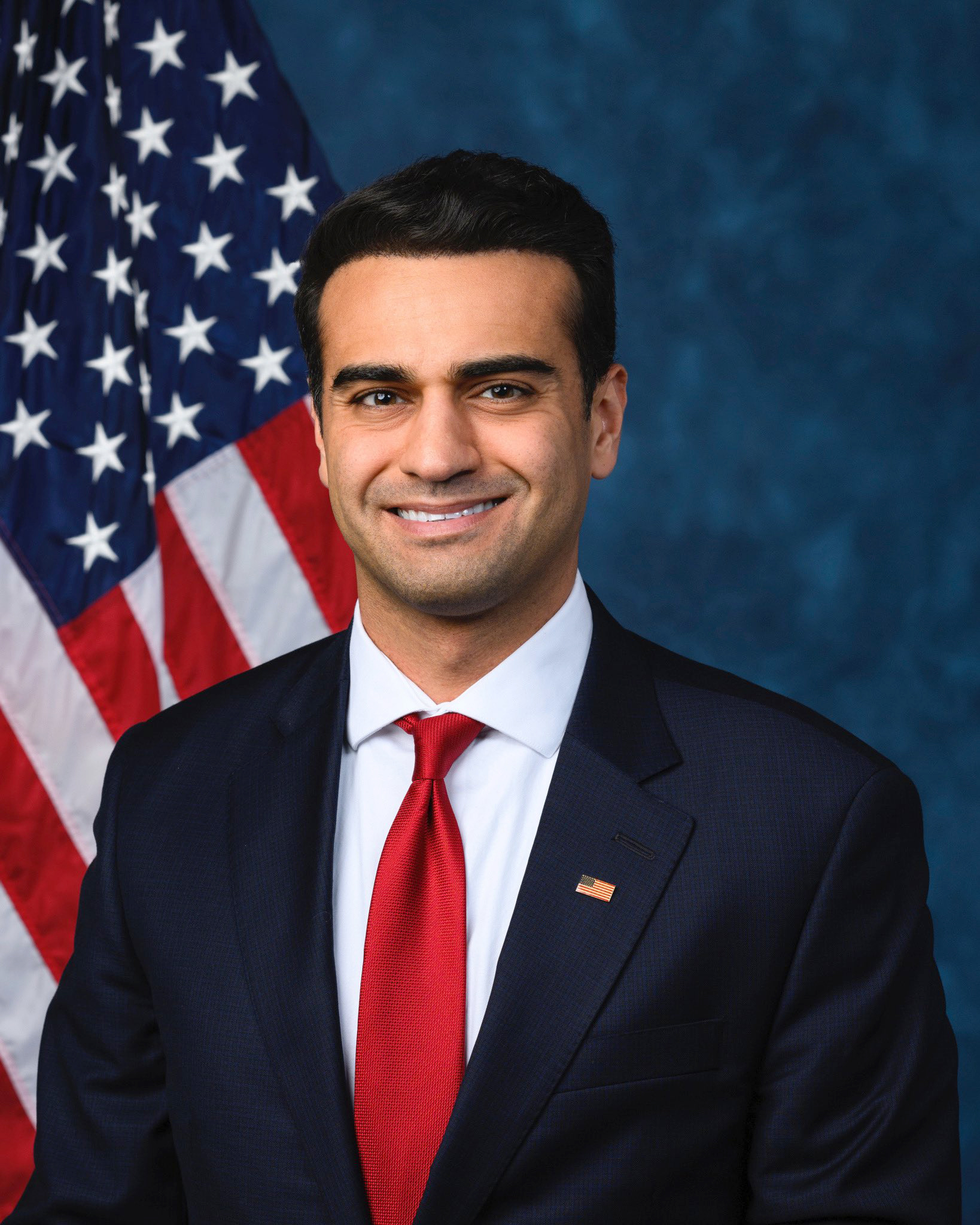
Hamadeh's official portrait, 2024

Hamadeh took office to the 119th United States Congress on January 3, 2025. He became one of the first two Middle Eastern Americans to represent Arizona in Congress, alongside Democrat Yassamin Ansari.

=== Committee assignments ===
- Committee on Armed Services
  - Subcommittee on Intelligence and Special Operations
  - Subcommittee on Strategic Forces
  - Subcommittee on Tactical Air and Land Forces
- Committee on Veterans' Affairs
  - Subcommittee on Economic Opportunity
  - Subcommittee on Health

=== Caucus memberships ===
- Congressional Western Caucus

== Political positions ==
=== Abortion ===
Running for Attorney General in 2022, Hamadeh had said that he would enforce Arizona's then near-total abortion ban, a law from the territorial period, arguing that the Attorney General cannot disregard the law. Running for Congress in 2024, he said that abortion should be a state issue, allowing each state to decide the legality of abortion within its jurisdiction.

=== Election integrity ===
Hamadeh has supported Donald Trump's false assertions that he won the 2020 United States presidential election. He later alleged fraud in the 2026 Los Angeles mayoral election, calling to federalize elections.

=== Energy ===
Hamadeh opposes Green New Deal policies, believing they would only further aggravate high living costs and worsen energy reliability. He has pointed to California as an example of failed energy policy.

=== Healthcare ===
Hamadeh voted in 2026 against extending the Affordable Care Act enhanced tax credits.

=== Immigration ===
In his congressional campaign, Hamadeh named the ongoing border crisis as one of the biggest problems facing the 8th congressional district. He has declared support for finishing the Mexico–United States border wall, ending the practice of "catch and release," and designating drug cartels as terrorist organizations.

=== Foreign policy ===
==== Israel ====
Hamadeh is a strong supporter of Israel, stating that "Jewish people have no bigger ally than me." He has said that his views on Israel were affected by a visit he made to the country while in law school. Hamadeh believed that he was better accepted as a Druze in Israel than in neighboring Lebanon, which further cemented his support. While campaigning for Congress, he criticized the nationwide pro-Palestine university demonstrations and said that "there was a direct connection between Marxism and the rise of antisemitism in the U.S. since October 7."

==== Kurdistan Region ====
Following two energy deals worth $110 billion between the Kurdistan Region and several U.S.-based oil and gas companies on May 21, 2025, Hamadeh expressed his support for the Kurdistan Region, calling it a "success story". He also praised the Peshmerga for their role in the fight against ISIS, stating, "When we saw the rise of ISIS, no one wanted to take them on — yet the Kurdish Peshmerga did an incredibly effective job of rooting out terrorism".

== Electoral history ==
=== 2022 ===
Republican primary results
Party	Candidate	Votes	%
Republican	Abraham Hamadeh	265,636	33.56
Republican	Rodney Glassman	186,863	23.60
Republican	Andrew Gould	132,253	16.71
Republican	Dawn Grove	94,670	11.96
Republican	Lacy Cooper	67,742	8.56
Republican	Tiffany Shedd	44,453	5.61
Total votes		791,617	100.00

2022 Arizona Attorney General election
Party	Candidate	Votes	%	±%
Democratic	Kris Mayes	1,254,809	49.94%	+1.68%
Republican	Abraham Hamadeh	1,254,529	49.93%	−1.80%
Write-in		3,052	0.12%	+0.11%
Total votes		2,512,390	100.0%	
Democratic gain from Republican				

=== 2024 ===
Republican primary results
Party	Candidate	Votes	%
Republican	Abraham Hamadeh	30,686	29.9
Republican	Blake Masters	26,422	25.7
Republican	Ben Toma	21,549	21.0
Republican	Trent Franks	16,714	16.3
Republican	Anthony Kern	4,922	4.8
Republican	Pat Briody	2,336	2.3
Total votes		102,629	100.0

2024 Arizona's 8th congressional district election
Party	Candidate	Votes	%	±%
Republican	Abraham Hamadeh	208,269	56.50%	−40.00%
Democratic	Greg Whitten	160,344	43.50%	N/A
Total votes		368,613	100.0%	
Republican hold				

== Personal life ==
Hamadeh identifies his religious identity as non-denominational or "nothing in particular". His older brother, Waseem Hamadeh, works in a Phoenix-based real estate firm and has made $1 million contributions to both of his campaigns.

== See also ==
- List of Arab and Middle Eastern Americans in the United States Congress

U.S. House of Representatives
Preceded by Debbie Lesko	Member of the U.S. House of Representatives from Arizona's 8th congressional district 2025–present	Incumbent
U.S. order of precedence (ceremonial)
Preceded by Adam Gray	United States representatives by seniority 386th	Succeeded by Mike Haridopolos
