= KGMN =

Country music radio station in Kingman, Arizona, United States

- Kingman, Arizona; United States
- Frequency: 100.1 MHz
- Branding: Super Country 100.1

Programming
- Format: Country

Ownership
- Owner: New West Broadcasting Systems, Inc.
- Sister stations: KZKE KYET

History
- Call sign meaning: KinGMaN

Technical information
- Licensing authority: FCC
- Facility ID: 48680
- Class: C2
- ERP: 910 watts
- HAAT: 883 meters (2897 feet)
- Transmitter coordinates: 35°06′37″N 113°52′55″W

Links
- Public license information: Public file; LMS
- Website: fm.rs/us/super-country/

KGMN (100.1 FM, "Super Country 100.1") is a radio station licensed to serve Kingman, Bullhead City and Lake Havasu City, Arizona. The station is owned by New West Broadcasting Systems, Inc., owned by Arizona State Mine Inspector Joe Hart and his wife Rhonda. The Harts purchased KGMN in 1984, when it was airing a rock format. It airs a country music format.

The station was assigned the KGMN call letters by the Federal Communications Commission on January 30, 1984.

== Booster and translator ==
Call sign	Frequency	City of license	FID	ERP (W)	Class	FCC info
KGMN-FM1 (booster)	(100.1 FM) FM	Bullhead City, AZ		3	D	
K278AA (translator)	(103.5 FM) FM	Lake Havasu City, AZ		49	D	
