= 2026 in Arizona =

- Decades: 2000s; 2010s; 2020s
- See also: History of Arizona; Historical outline of Arizona; List of years in Arizona; 2026 in the United States

The following is a list of events of the year 2026 in Arizona.

== Incumbents ==
=== State Government ===
- Governor: Katie Hobbs (D)

== Events ==
=== January ===
- January 2 – A helicopter crashes near Telegraph Canyon, Pinal County, killing the four occupants, a man and his three adult nieces. A witness and local authorities say the crash occurred after the helicopter struck a slackline.
- January 5
  - Defense Secretary Pete Hegseth censures Senator Mark Kelly over a video he and other Democrats made in November that urged military members to refuse unlawful orders.
  - The Arizona Supreme Court is evacuated after a package is left outside that contains items testing positive for explosive substances. However, the Arizona Department of Public Safety later says there was no explosive material in the package.

=== February ===
- February 1 – Nancy Guthrie, mother of Today host Savannah Guthrie, is kidnapped from her Catalina Foothills home.
- February 4 – Two Arizona Department of Public Safety employees are killed in a helicopter crash while responding to an active shooter situation near Flagstaff.
- February 6 – A superior court judge rules that Arizona must stop enforcing restrictions on abortion that contradict a 2024 constitutional amendment.

=== March ===
- March 4 – A Piper PA-28 aircraft crashes into two homes in Phoenix, injuring three people.
- March 20 – Temperatures reach 110°F (43°C) in the Martinez Lake area, breaking the record for the highest temperature ever recorded in March in the United States.
- March 23 – Immigration and Customs Enforcement agents are deployed to 14 airports nationwide, including Phoenix Sky Harbor International Airport.
- March 27 – Governor Hobbs vetoes a bill that would have renamed Arizona State Route 202 after Charlie Kirk, who was assassinated in 2025.

=== April ===
- April 5 – The 2026 NCAA Division I women's basketball championship game is held at the Mortgage Matchup Center in Phoenix, in which the UCLA Bruins beat the South Carolina Gamecocks 79–51.
- April 9 - Murder of Allison Feldman: Ian Mitcham is found guilty of the first-degree murder of Allison Feldman, 11 years after she was murdered.
- April 10 – Pima County Sheriff's deputies shoot a 24-year-old man during a hoax swatting call, resulting in him being paralyzed from the waist-down.

=== May ===
- May 20 – Murder of Charles Perez: The Florence State Prison executes Leroy Dean McGill by lethal injection. He was sentenced to death in 2004 for the murder of a man by burning and the attempted murder of a woman.

=== July ===
- July 19 – Nine people, including a suspect, are injured in a mass shooting in Downtown Tucson.
- July 31 – The Pima County Sheriff's Office releases two ransom notes sent to Savannah Guthrie by the suspected kidnappers of Nancy Guthrie.

=== August ===
- August 2 – Two Phoenix Police officers pull over a vehicle and are later reported for breaking the car's windows, punching the driver, threatening to shoot him, and dragging the passenger out of the vehicle and handcuffing her. Tempe Police initially investigate the stop as a possible carjacking by impersonators, as the officers did not report the stop. The two Phoenix officers are later charged with aggravated assault and kidnapping.
- August 14 – Bernadette Greene-Placentia, the Democratic nominee for AZ-08, is attacked and raped while repairing a broken campaign sign in Sun City. Greene-Placentia's account is later published by the Phoenix New Times on October 7.
- August 25 – Agents from the United States Border Patrol enter the Tohono Oʼodham Nation as part of a plan to build a border wall with Mexico. The incident occurs after the nation escorted out wall developers in the weeks prior. The Tohono Oʼodham Nation also says Mexican law enforcement is working with DHS on the southern side of the border.
- August 29 – The Grand Canyon floods, killing three people and severely damaging the only water pipeline serving the South Rim.
- August 31 – A man fatally shoots two people in the parking lot of a gay bar in Tucson before killing himself. The shooting is investigated as a hate crime.

=== September ===
- September 17 – A former bodyguard and romantic partner of former Senator Kyrsten Sinema is arrested for allegedly breaking into her home and damaging paintings on August 30.
- September 30 – Arizona State University places men's ice hockey coach Greg Powers on administrative leave amid an investigation into a player's collapse. On August 20, defenseman Matthew Mayich collapsed of heat stroke during outdoor training exercises, with a family attorney saying he was unlikely to recover.

=== November ===
- November 3 – 2026 Arizona gubernatorial election: Governor Katie Hobbs wins reelection, beating Republican challenger Representative Andy Biggs.
- November 15 – A Piper Comanche aircraft crashes in the North Rim area of Grand Canyon National Park, resulting in the deaths of three people.

== See also ==
- 2026 in the United States
