= 1912 in Arizona =

- Decades: 1910s; 1920s; 1930s
- See also: History of Arizona; Historical outline of Arizona; List of years in Arizona; 1912 in the United States

The following is a list of events of the year 1912 in Arizona.

== Incumbents ==
=== State government ===
- Governor: George W. P. Hunt (D) (starting February 14)

== Events ==
- February 14 –
  - The Arizona Territory is admitted to the union of the United States, as the 48th U.S state.
  - George W. P. Hunt is elected the first governor of Arizona.
- November 5 – 1912 United States presidential election in Arizona.

== See also ==
- 1912 in the United States
