= Mohave Community College =

Public college in Mohave County, Arizona, US

Mohave College
- Type: Public community college
- Established: 1970; 56 years ago
- Accreditation: Higher Learning Commission
- President: Dr. Chrissy Holliday
- Location: Mohave, Arizona, United States; 36.981°N 112.972°W
- Colors: Red, White, Black
- Mascot: Bighorns
- Website: www.mohave.edu

Mohave College is a public community college with campuses in Kingman, Lake Havasu City, Bullhead City, and Colorado City, serving Mohave County, Arizona and the surrounding communities. It is accredited by the Higher Learning Commission.

== History ==
In October 1970, a public vote established the Mohave County Community College District and elected its first board of governors. The board planned to have three campuses (in Kingman, Bullhead City and Lake Havasu City), later expanding to Colorado City. In June 1971, J. Leonard and Grace Neal donated 160 acres of land north of Kingman where the college's first facilities were developed, and in October 1972, McCulloch Properties donated a parcel of land located in Lake Havasu City. The college became part of the Arizona State System of Community Colleges in 1974, and received full accreditation from the North Central Association of Colleges and Schools in 1981. In August 2025, the College officially change its public-facing name to Mohave College, which better reflects its expanded higher education offerings and services, including bachelor's degrees.

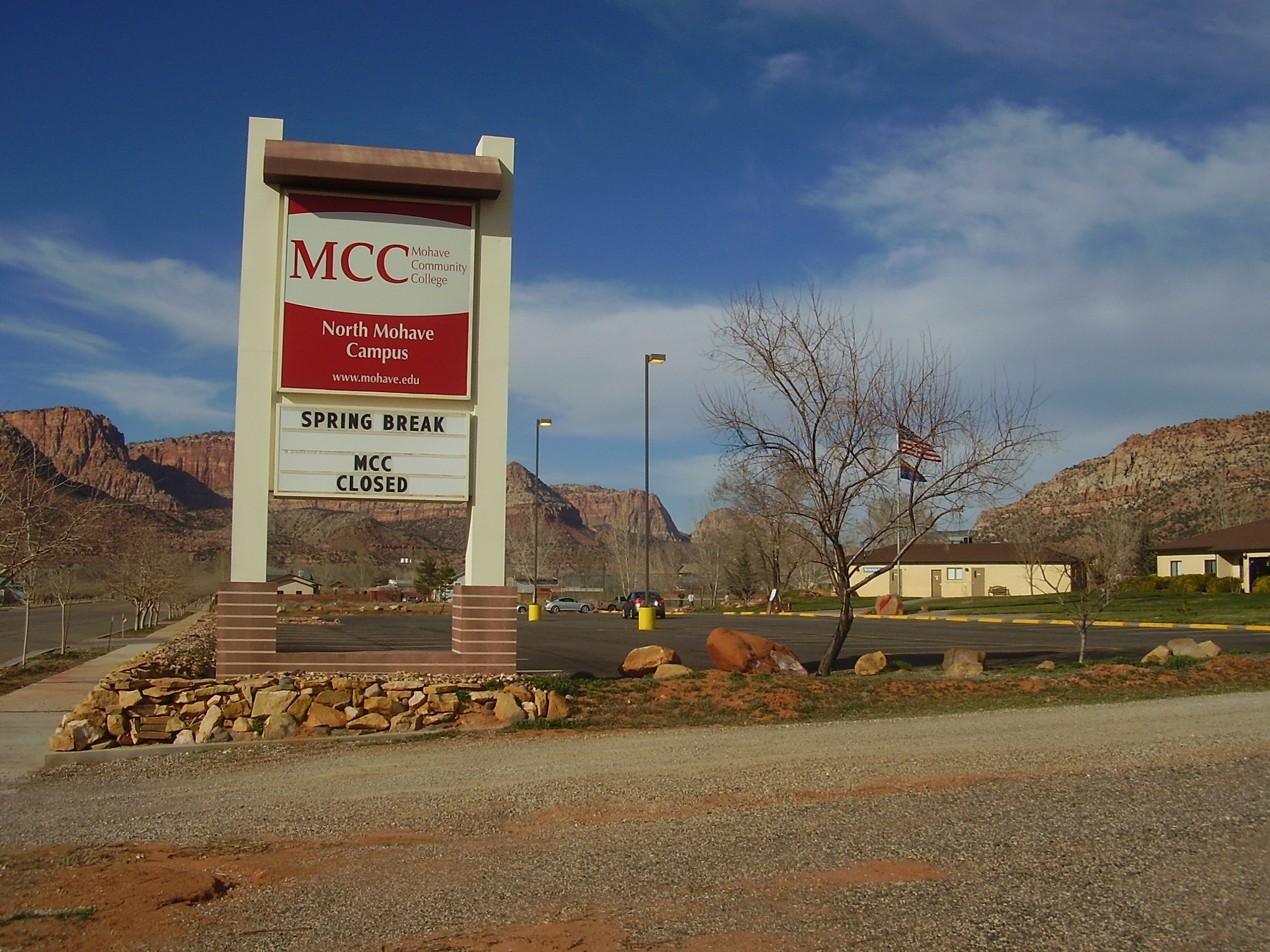
North Mohave Campus in Colorado City

== Academics ==
In the early 1970s, Mohave Community College, MCC, (name changed to Mohave College in 2025) courses were offered at night and were occupational in nature. In 1981, the college started offering nursing classes and was accredited in 1982 – eventually partnering with Allied Health. In the late 1980s, MCC became the primary provider of Adult Education/GED program services in Mohave County.

MCC's programs expanded to include Business, Culinary Arts, Computer Information Systems, Education, Engineering, Industrial Technology, Liberal Arts & Sciences, and Public Safety & Legal Studies. Recently, the school welding program has grown significantly and met national standards.

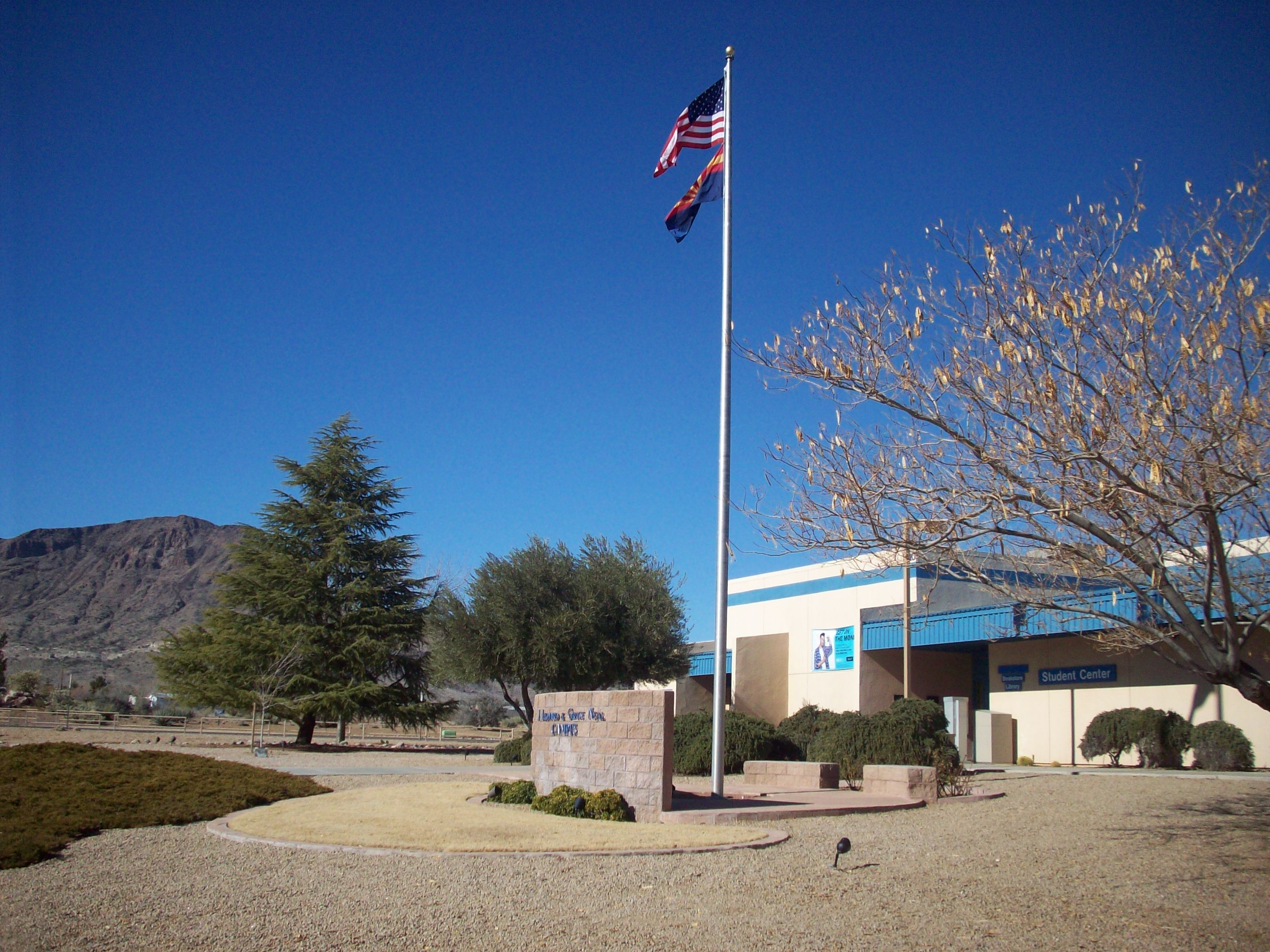
MCC's Neal Campus in Kingman, Arizona (photo from 1980s).

MCC also has a long history of distance education. In the late 1980s MCC began delivering instruction by videotape and connected the campuses by telecommunication links. Presently, the school utilizes online classes and smartboard technology for distance education.

== Enrollment and demographics ==
Enrollment at MCC has increased since its founding in 1971. In 2008, Mohave Community College placed 24th nationally among community colleges in enrollment growth. As of 2011 it had 1,707 full-time students and 4,400 part-time students on all campuses, with 64% being female and 75% being non-Hispanic white.
