= Arizona Bar Exam =

Admission requirement to practice law

The Arizona Bar Exam is the exam administered by the Admissions Unit of the Certification and Licensing Division of the Supreme Court of Arizona. A satisfactory score on the Arizona Bar Exam is one of numerous requirements for admission to be admitted as an attorney in the State of Arizona.

== Format of Exam ==
The Arizona Bar Exam is a two-day exam. The first day of the exam consists of 6 essay questions testing common law and legal principles generally recognized throughout the United States, and 2 MPT questions testing legal analysis and writing. The second day of the exam consists of the Multistate Bar Exam, a multiple choice examination administered by the National Conference of Bar Examiners (NCBE).

=== First Day ===
The essay portion of the Arizona Bar Exam may test the following subjects:

- Contracts;
- Torts;
- Federal constitutional law;
- Criminal law;
- Constitutional criminal procedure;
- Evidence
- Real Property
- Business organizations (Corporations, Partnerships, etc.);
- UCC 9 (Secured Transactions);
- Wills & trusts;
- Family law;
- Professional responsibility;
- Federal civil procedure; and
- Conflicts of law

As of the July, 2012 exam, Arizona is now administering the Uniform Bar Examination (UBE) which does not include:

- Community property; or
- Arizona constitutional law

=== Second Day ===
Day two of the exam consists of the Multistate Bar Exam or MBE. This is the multiple-choice portion of the bar exam. The MBE is a six-hour, exam consisting of two hundred multiple-choice questions covering Contracts and Sales, Torts, Constitutional law, Criminal law, Evidence, and Real Property, Federal civil procedure. The MBE is divided into two period of three hours each, one in the morning and one in the afternoon. There are 100 questions administered in each 3-hour period. There are 34 questions each in Contracts and Torts, and 33 questions each in Constitutional Law, Criminal Law (including aspects of Criminal Procedure), Evidence, and Real Property.

== Grading information ==
A new scoring system will be effective from July 2012 forward. The Multistate Bar Exam is scaled from 1-200. The highest possible Arizona essay exam score is 120 for the essay portion and 80 for the MPT. Arizona combines the three sections for a total of 400 points. In order to be deemed successful on the Arizona Bar Exam, applicants must achieve a combined score of 273 or higher.

== MPRE Requirements ==
In addition to successfully passing the Arizona Bar Exam, an applicant must attain a scaled score of 85 on the Multistate Professional Responsibility Exam within two (2) years before the successful bar exam or within the time frame for taking the oath of admission after the successful bar exam (An applicant must pass MPRE prior to being sworn in). The MPRE is administered separately from the Arizona Bar Exam.

== See also ==
- Admission to the bar in the United States
