= 2022 Arizona Attorney General election =

Elections in Arizona, USA

- November 8, 2022
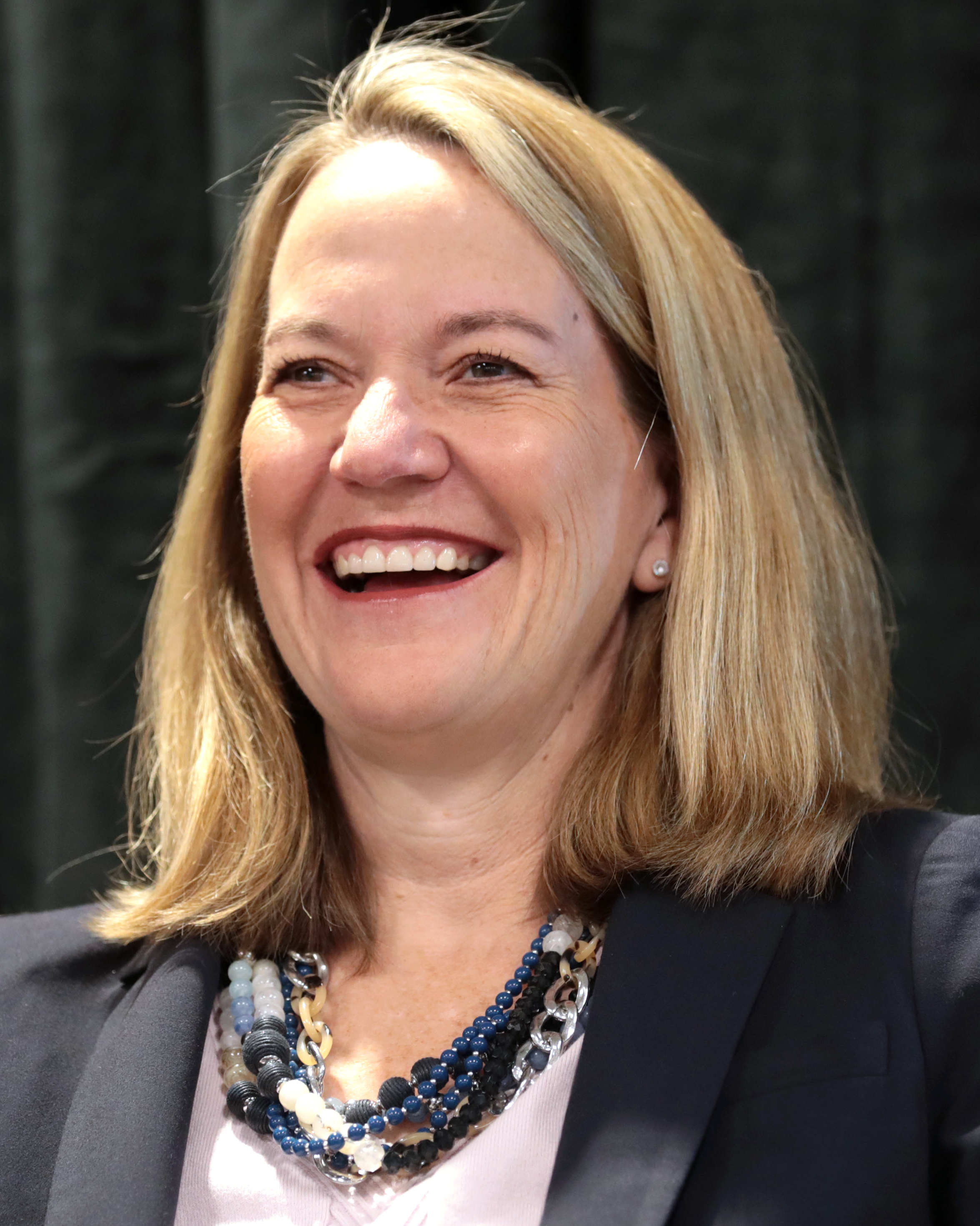

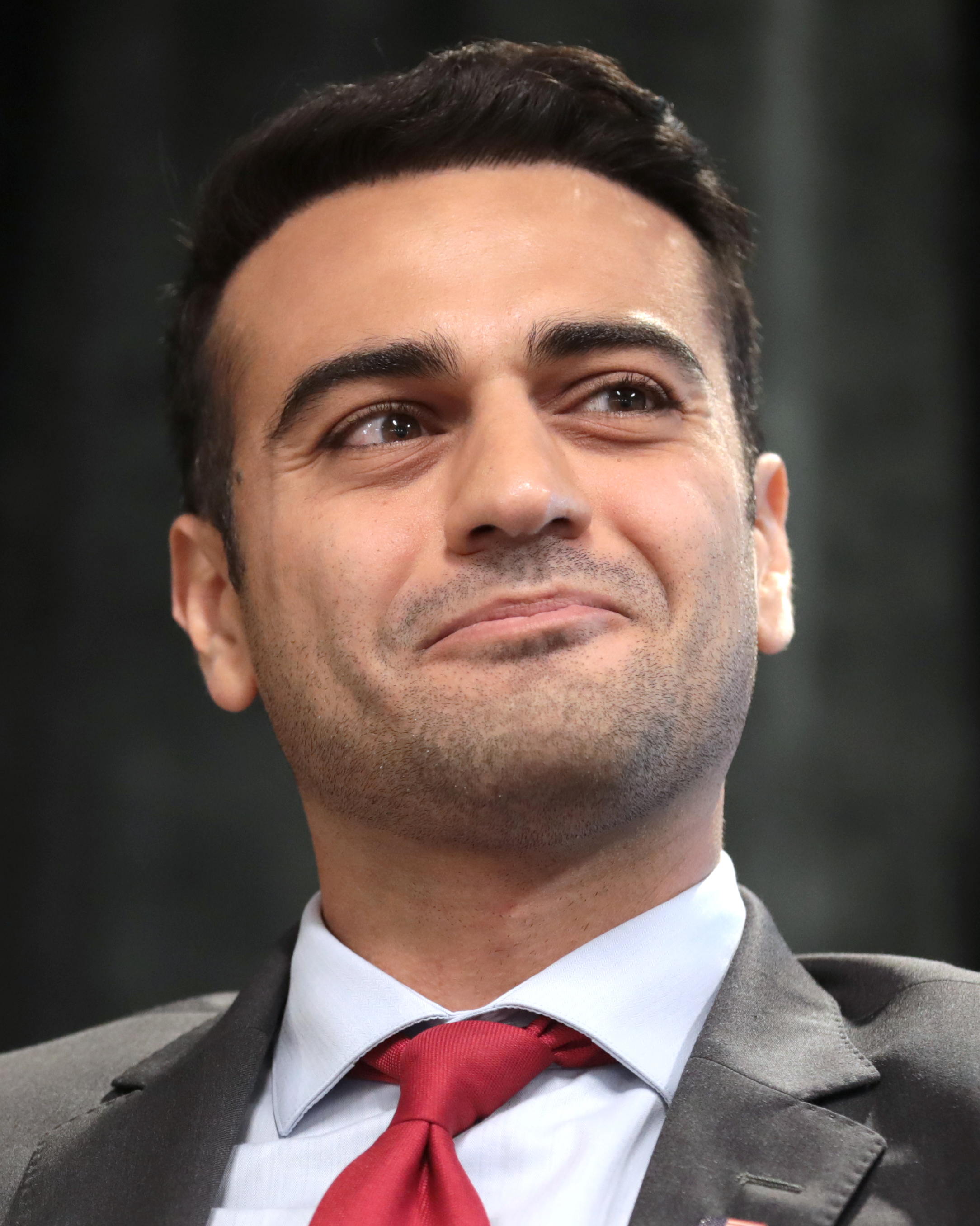
Nominee	Kris Mayes	Abraham Hamadeh
Party	Democratic	Republican
Popular vote	1,254,809	1,254,529
Percentage	49.94%	49.93%
- Mayes: 50–60% 60–70% 70–80% 80–90% >90% Hamadeh: 40–50% 50–60% 60–70% 70–80% 80–90% >90% No votes
Attorney General before election
Mark Brnovich
Republican
Elected Attorney General
Kris Mayes
Democratic

The 2022 Arizona Attorney General election took place on November 8, 2022, to elect the next attorney general of Arizona concurrently with other federal and state elections. Incumbent Republican attorney general Mark Brnovich was term-limited and could not seek a third term in office. With a margin of 0.01%, Democrat Kris Mayes defeated Republican Abe Hamadeh in one of the closest elections in Arizona history, and the closest attorney general race of the 2022 election cycle.

On November 21, the final tally of votes initially left Mayes leading Hamadeh by just 510 votes out of more than 2.5 million cast. This triggered an automatic recount under Arizona law; the recount was completed on December 29 with Mayes winning by an even slimmer 280 vote margin and just 0.01%, making it the closest statewide election in any state in 2022. The results were certified by the Secretary of State and the election process completed on December 29. Hamadeh filed a lawsuit to block certification of the election, but state courts rejected it as election challenges could only be filed after certification.

Mayes became the first Democrat to win this office since Terry Goddard in 2006.

== Republican primary ==
=== Candidates ===
==== Declared ====
- Lacy Cooper, former assistant U.S. Attorney
- Rodney Glassman, former Tucson city councilor, nominee for Corporation Commission in 2018, and Democratic nominee for U.S. Senate in 2010
- Andrew Gould, former justice of the Arizona Supreme Court (2016–2021)
- Dawn Grove, chair of the Arizona Chamber of Commerce and Industry
- Abraham Hamadeh, former prosecutor in the Maricopa County Attorney's office and U.S. Army captain
- Tiffany Shedd, farmer, lawyer, candidate for Arizona's 1st congressional district in 2018 and nominee in 2020

=== Endorsements ===
Rodney Glassman

U.S. Representatives

- Paul Gosar, U.S. Representative for Arizona's 4th congressional district (2011–present)
Andrew Gould

Statewide officials

- Jan Brewer, former Governor of Arizona (2009–2015) and former Secretary of State of Arizona (2003–2009)
- Robert K. Corbin, former Arizona Attorney General (1979–1991)
Abraham Hamadeh

U.S. Executive Branch officials

- Donald Trump, 45th President of the United States (2017–2021)

Organizations

- Veterans for Trump
Tiffany Shedd

Organizations

- Maggie's List

=== Polling ===
Poll source	Date(s) administered	Sample size (Note: Key: A – all adults RV – registered voters LV – likely voters V – unclear)	Margin of error	Lacy Cooper	Rodney Glassman	Andy Gould	Dawn Grove	Abe Hamadeh	Tiffany Shedd	Other	Undecided
Rasmussen Reports	July 27–28, 2022	710 (LV)	± 4.0%	4%	21%	12%	6%	26%	4%	6%	20%
OH Predictive Insights	July 27, 2022	502 (LV)	± 4.4%	2%	16%	7%	5%	31%	4%	–	35%
KAConsulting LLC (R)	July 11–12, 2022	400 (RV)	± 4.9%	2%	6%	5%	10%	17%	3%	–	57%
OH Predictive Insights	June 30 – July 2, 2022	515 (LV)	± 4.3%	3%	6%	6%	5%	7%	4%	–	68%
Cygnal (R) (Note: This poll was sponsored by Hamadeh's campaign)	June 9–10, 2022	– (LV)	–	1%	4%	6%	4%	10%	5%	–	72%
OH Predictive Insights	April 4–5, 2022	500 (LV)	± 4.4%	4%	5%	5%	3%	3%	4%	–	76%

=== Results ===
Republican primary results by county Hamadeh: 20–30%; 30–40%; Glassman: 20–30%; 30–40%; Gould: 30-40%

Republican primary results
Party	Candidate	Votes	%
Republican	Abraham Hamadeh	265,636	33.56%
Republican	Rodney Glassman	186,863	23.60%
Republican	Andrew Gould	132,253	16.71%
Republican	Dawn Grove	94,670	11.96%
Republican	Lacy Cooper	67,742	8.56%
Republican	Tiffany Shedd	44,453	5.61%
Total votes		791,617	100.0%

== Democratic primary ==
=== Candidates ===
==== Declared ====
- Kris Mayes, former Republican chair of the Arizona Corporation Commission (2003–2010) and press secretary for Janet Napolitano's 2002 gubernatorial campaign

==== Withdrew ====
- Robert McWhriter, civil rights attorney
- Diego Rodriguez, former state representative for the 27th district

==== Declined ====
- January Contreras, former director of the Arizona Department of Health Services and nominee for attorney general in 2018
- Greg Stanton, U.S. Representative for Arizona's 9th congressional district and former Mayor of Phoenix (running for re-election)

=== Endorsements ===
Kristin Mayes

Organizations

- Equality Arizona
- LGBTQ Victory Fund
- NARAL Pro-Choice America

=== Results ===
Democratic primary results
Party	Candidate	Votes	%
Democratic	Kris Mayes	556,351	100.0%
Total votes		556,351	100.0%

== Libertarian primary ==
=== Candidates ===
==== Declared ====
- Michael Kielsky, attorney and perennial candidate (write-in)

=== Results ===
Libertarian primary results
Party	Candidate	Votes	%
Libertarian	Michael Kielsky (write-in)	571	100.0%
Total votes		571	100.0%

== General election ==
=== Predictions ===
Source	Ranking	As of
Sabato's Crystal Ball	Tossup	November 3, 2022
Elections Daily	Leans R	November 1, 2022

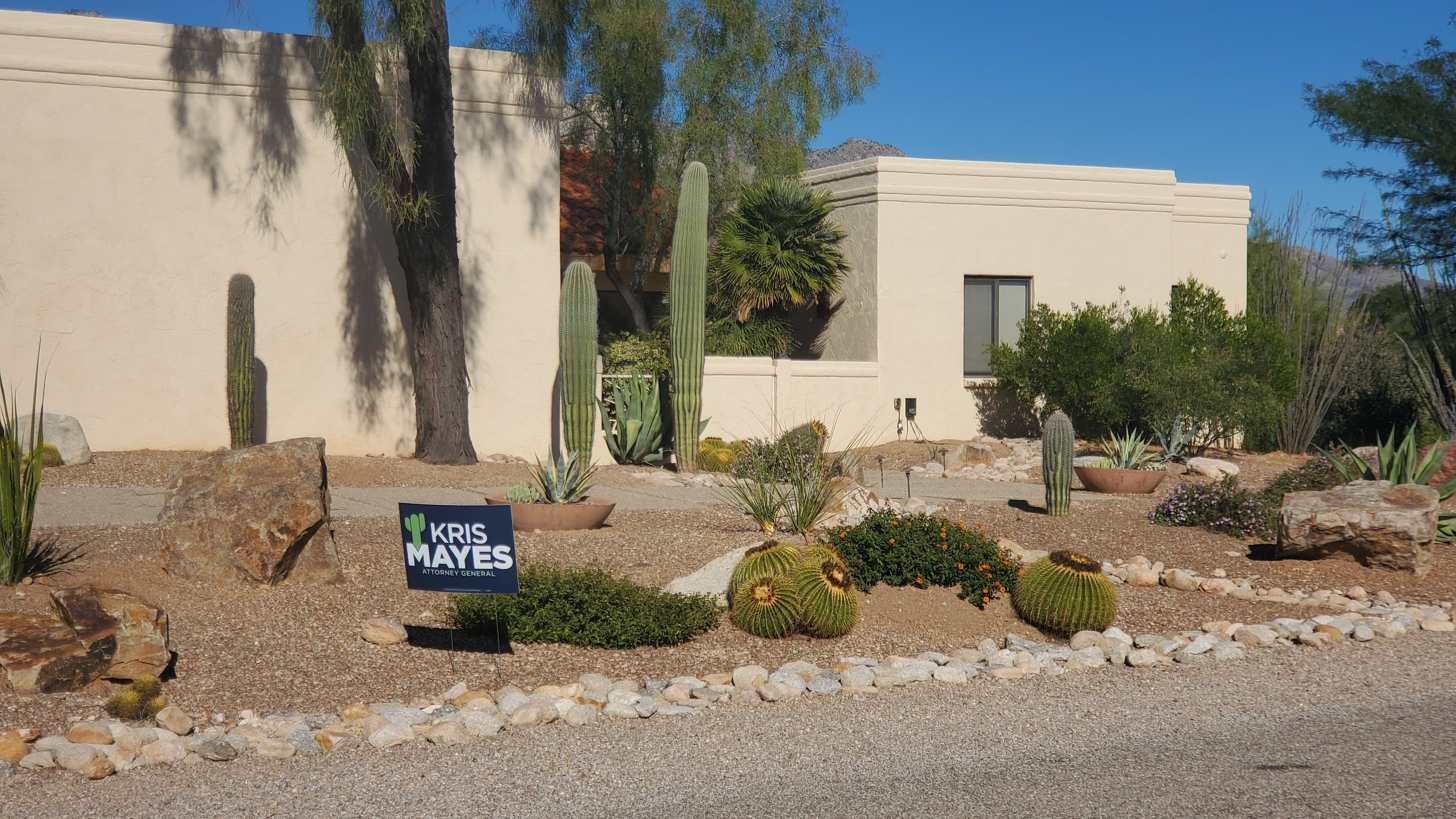
A yard sign supporting Mayes in Tucson

=== Post-primary endorsements ===
Kris Mayes (D)

U.S. Executive Branch officials

- Barack Obama, 44th President of the United States (2009–2017)

Labor unions

- Communications Workers of America
- United Mine Workers of America

Organizations

- Human Rights Campaign

=== Polling ===
Poll source	Date(s) administered	Sample size	Margin of error	Abraham Hamadeh (R)	Kristin Mayes (D)	Other	Undecided
Data Orbital (R)	November 4–6, 2022	550 (LV)	± 4.3%	48%	45%	1% (Note: "Refused" with 1%)	5%
KAConsulting (R) (Note: Poll conducted for Citizens United, a conservative non-profit organization.)	November 2–3, 2022	501 (LV)	± 4.4%	46%	39%	–	10%
Big Data Poll (R)	October 31 – November 3, 2022	1,051 (LV)	± 5.0%	49%	46%	–	6%
HighGround Inc.	November 1–2, 2022	500 (LV)	± 4.4%	44%	42%	1% (Note: "Some other candidate" with 1%)	13%
OH Predictive Insights	October 24–26, 2022	600 (LV)	± 4.0%	42%	45%	–	12%
Susquehanna Polling & Research (R) (Note: Poll conducted for The Federalist, a conservative online magazine.)	October 14–18, 2022	600 (LV)	± 4.0%	42%	45%	4% (Note: Severson (L/WI) with 4%; "Refused" with <1%)	10%
The Trafalgar Group (R)	October 10–16, 2022	1,084 (LV)	± 2.9%	47%	43%	–	10%
HighGround Inc.	October 12–13, 2022	500 (LV)	± 4.4%	43%	38%	2% (Note: "Some other candidate" with 2%)	17%
Big Data Poll (R)	October 2–5, 2022	974 (LV)	± 3.1%	47%	42%	–	12%
Global Strategy Group (D) (Note: This poll was sponsored by End Citizens United and Let America Vote, who support Mayes)	September 13–20, 2022	800 (LV)	± 3.5%	45%	45%	–	10%
The Trafalgar Group (R)	September 14–17, 2022	1,080 (LV)	± 2.9%	50%	41%	–	9%

Hypothetical polling

Poll source	Date(s) administered	Sample size	Margin of error	Generic Republican	January Contreras (D)	Undecided
Data for Progress (D) (Note: Poll sponsored by the Defend Students Action Fund)	September 15–22, 2020	481 (LV)	± 4.4%	40%	39%	22%

=== Certified results ===
2022 Arizona Attorney General election
Party	Candidate	Votes	%	±%
Democratic	Kris Mayes	1,254,613	50.00%	+1.74%
Republican	Abraham Hamadeh	1,254,102	49.98%	−1.74%
Libertarian	Samantha Severson (write-in)	418	0.02%	N/A
Total votes		2,509,133	100.0%	

=== Recount ===
On December 5, 2022, following election certification, Secretary of State and governor-elect Katie Hobbs petitioned the Maricopa County Superior Court to initiate a recount for the Attorney General election. On the same day, Maricopa County Superior Court Judge Timothy J. Thomason ordered for the recount to begin. Under Arizona state law, an automatic recount is triggered if the margin is less than 0.5%. In the Attorney General race, Democrat Kris Mayes led Republican Abraham Hamadeh by 511 votes, a margin of 0.02%, which fell within the automatic recount threshold.

As of December 28, all counties had completed their recount tabulations, and audited and sent their final results to the Arizona Secretary of State's office. The office was to compile and provide the results to the Maricopa County Superior Court, which may be released upon the court's certification. This hearing was scheduled for the 21st; however, the office motioned the court on that day to reschedule it to the 29th at 10 a.m. (only four days prior to the inauguration of the winner) due to the delays in Pinal County.

On December 29, Judge Timothy Thomason announced the results of the recount, confirming Kris Mayes as the winner with a reduced margin of 280 votes.

2022 Arizona Attorney General election
Party	Candidate	Votes	%	±%
Democratic	Kris Mayes	1,254,809	49.94%	+1.68%
Republican	Abraham Hamadeh	1,254,529	49.93%	−1.80%
Write-in		3,052	0.12%	+0.11%
Total votes		2,512,390	100.0%	
Democratic gain from Republican				

==== By county ====
By county

County	Kris Mayes Democratic		Abraham Hamadeh Republican		Write-ins		Total
County	%	#	%	#	%	#	Total
Apache	67.70%	17,930	32.07%	8,494	0.23%	62	26,486
Cochise	39.98%	18,480	59.85%	27,664	0.17%	80	46,224
Coconino	63.24%	34,043	36.60%	19,700	0.16%	88	53,831
Gila	34.66%	7,727	65.21%	14,538	0.13%	28	22,293
Graham	28.72%	3,085	71.12%	7,640	0.16%	17	10,742
Greenlee	38.97%	938	60.74%	1,462	0.29%	7	2,407
La Paz	30.33%	1,653	69.50%	3,788	0.17%	9	5,450
Maricopa	50.80%	766,874	49.09%	740,965	0.11%	1,706	1,509,545
Mohave	24.39%	19,585	75.45%	60,593	0.16%	134	80,312
Navajo	45.36%	18,129	54.42%	21,747	0.22%	89	39,965
Pima	59.96%	236,264	39.93%	157,348	0.11%	452	394,064
Pinal	41.49%	59,068	58.38%	83,116	0.13%	188	142,372
Santa Cruz	66.99%	8,721	32.90%	4,283	0.11%	15	13,019
Yavapai	35.53%	42,813	64.35%	77,487	0.12%	119	120,419
Yuma	43.08%	19,499	56.79%	25,704	0.13%	58	45,261

	Kris Mayes Democratic			Abraham Hamadeh Republican		
County	Certified votes	Recount votes	Change	Certified votes	Recount votes	Change
Apache	17,871	17,930	+59	8,481	8,494	+13
Cochise	18,481	18,480	-1	27,664	27,664	Steady
Coconino	34,043	34,043	Steady	19,700	19,700	Steady
Gila	7,727	7,727	Steady	14,538	14,538	Steady
Graham	3,084	3,085	+1	7,640	7,640	Steady
Greenlee	938	938	Steady	1,462	1,462	Steady
La Paz	1,648	1,653	+5	3,775	3,788	+13
Maricopa	766,869	766,874	+5	740,960	740,965	+5
Mohave	19,583	19,585	+2	60,592	60,593	+1
Navajo	18,119	18,129	+10	21,748	21,747	-1
Pima	236,264	236,264	Steady	157,350	157,348	-2
Pinal	58,953	59,068	+115	82,724	83,116	+392
Santa Cruz	8,723	8,721	-2	4,282	4,283	+1
Yavapai	42,810	42,813	+3	77,481	77,487	+6
Yuma	19,500	19,499	-1	25,705	25,704	-1

Counties that flipped from Republican to Democratic

- Maricopa (largest municipality: Phoenix)

==== By congressional district ====
Mayes won five of nine congressional districts, including two that concurrently elected Republicans.

District	Mayes	Hamadeh	Representative
1st	51%	49%	David Schweikert
2nd	46%	54%	Tom O'Halleran (117th Congress)
2nd	46%	54%	Eli Crane (118th Congress)
3rd	76%	24%	Ruben Gallego
4th	56%	44%	Greg Stanton
5th	42%	58%	Andy Biggs
6th	52%	48%	Ann Kirkpatrick (117th Congress)
6th	52%	48%	Juan Ciscomani (118th Congress)
7th	66%	34%	Raúl Grijalva
8th	44%	56%	Debbie Lesko
9th	36%	64%	Paul Gosar

== Lawsuit over result ==
Hamadeh filed a lawsuit regarding the result of the election. On December 20, judge Lee Jantzen of Mohave County Superior Court denied Kris Mayes' and Secretary of State Katie Hobbs' motion to dismiss and stated that Hamadeh "is not alleging political motives or fraud or personal agendas being pushed", but "is simply alleging misconduct by mistake, or omission by election officials, led to erroneous count of votes and which if true could have led to an uncertain result." Jantzen added that honest mistakes by officials could not be used to overturn an election. Kris Mayes' attorney repeatedly stated that the evidence brought forward by Hamadeh was not large enough to ever be accepted by the strict standards of election law. Jantzen dismissed one count of the lawsuit, alleging that unverified early ballots were illegal votes.

This allowed for Hamadeh's lawsuit to proceed to an evidentiary hearing, which was held on December 23, lasting for three hours, with the result being that Judge Jantzen, ruling from the bench, denied Hamadeh's election challenge. Jantzen told Hamadeh's lawyer "you just haven't proven your case", with an absence of "even slight information" that "the election was done illegally or incorrectly." Jantzen declined to accept Hamadeh's lawyer's request to shift the vote margin as not being in the court's purview. Hamadeh's lawyer acknowledged to the court that his findings were insufficient. Mayes' attorney stated he would request the court to sanction him over the frivolous nature of the lawsuit, stating that in 37 years of practice he had "never been involved in such a gigantic waste of time as this case".

Hamadeh filed another lawsuit regarding the election result on January 4, 2023, after Mayes had already been sworn in as attorney general; the new lawsuit cited that the "recount results identified significant, material discrepancies" which were not known to the court during the previous lawsuit. Judge Jantzen rejected this lawsuit in July 2023, writing that election laws "preclude issuing a new trial with extended discovery", and finding that there was no new evidence that could not have been previously produced at the original trial. Hamadeh requested that the Arizona Supreme Court intervene in the lawsuit, but the Arizona Supreme Court responded that Hamadeh should follow the normal process to appeal to the Court of Appeals first, while further sanctioning Hamadeh and his legal team for having "misrepresented to this court that they had sought [a final judgment] when they had not done so".

The Arizona Supreme Court sanction involved Hamadeh being ordered to pay over $55,000 for Mayes and Arizona Secretary of State Adrian Fontes' legal fees.

== Notes ==
Partisan clients

== See also ==
- 2022 Arizona elections
- List of close election results
