= Brian Matlock =

American politician

14th Mine Inspector-elect of Arizona
- Assuming office January 2027
- Governor: Katie Hobbs
- Succeeding: Les Presmyk

Personal details
- Party: Democratic

Brian Matlock is an American politician who is the 14th Arizona State Mine Inspector-elect. He was elected in 2026, defeating the incumbent Mine Inspector, Republican Les Presmyk.

Matlock holds a BS in Mechanical Engineering from Tennessee Technological University and is a Marine reserves veteran.

Political offices
Preceded by Les Presmyk	Arizona State Mine Inspector; Taking office 2027	Elect
