= Les Presmyk =

American politician

13th Mine Inspector of Arizona
- Incumbent
- Assumed office September 15, 2025
- Governor: Katie Hobbs
- Preceded by: Paul Marsh

Member of the Gilbert Town Council
- In office 1999–2011

Personal details
- Born: Walter Lesley Presmyk
- Party: Republican
- Spouse: Paula
- Education: University of Arizona (BS)

Walter Lesley Presmyk is an American mining engineer and politician who has served as the 13th Arizona State Mine Inspector since 2025. Governor Katie Hobbs appointed Presmyk to the position in September 2025 following the resignation of Paul Marsh. A member of the Republican Party, Presmyk announced his intention to run for a full term in the 2026 general election.

== Career ==
=== Mining engineering ===
Presmyk earned a Bachelor of Science degree in mining engineering from the University of Arizona in 1975 and worked as a mining engineer for the Salt River Project for 30 years. He retired in 2017 after 41 years of mining engineering experience including on projects in Arizona, Mississippi, and Mexico.

Presmyk was awarded the 2017 Carnegie Mineralogical Award by the Carnegie Museum of Natural History, which "honors outstanding contributions in mineralogical preservation, conservation and education."

=== Gilbert Town Council ===
Presmyk served on the Gilbert Town Council from 1999 to 2011, including serving three terms as vice mayor. During his time on the council, he supported new bus shelters for transit riders and finding a permanent site for the Gilbert Days Rodeo.

In 2010, Presmyk and fellow councilmember Jenn Daniels formed "Operation Welcome Home" to honor the city's veterans. The program was recognized by the Arizona State Legislature and commissioned by the city to create a new memorial park in Gilbert by 2017, however the project was abandoned in 2023 amidst financial mismanagement and Presmyk resigned from the organization’s board due to lack of transparency by its director, Lisa Rigler.

=== State Mining Inspector ===
Following incumbent Arizona State Mine Inspector Paul Marsh's sudden resignation to take a new job in Texas, Governor Katie Hobbs appointed Presmyk to the position on September 15, 2025. He ran for a full term in 2026 but lost to his democrat opponent Brian Matlock in the 2026 Blue Wave that saw democrats win all of Arizona's State Wide Executive Offices and take control of both chambers of her legislature.

== Personal life ==
A resident of Gilbert since 1986, Presmyk and his wife Paula began dating as high school seniors and married after graduating college. His father was a World War II veteran and seven of his nieces and nephews have served in the U.S. Armed Forces, leading him to join Gilbert's Veteran Advisory Board and organize welcome ceremonies for returning veterans.

Political offices
Preceded by Paul Marsh	Mine Inspector of Arizona; 2025–present	Incumbent
