= Kris Mayes =

American attorney and politician (born 1971)

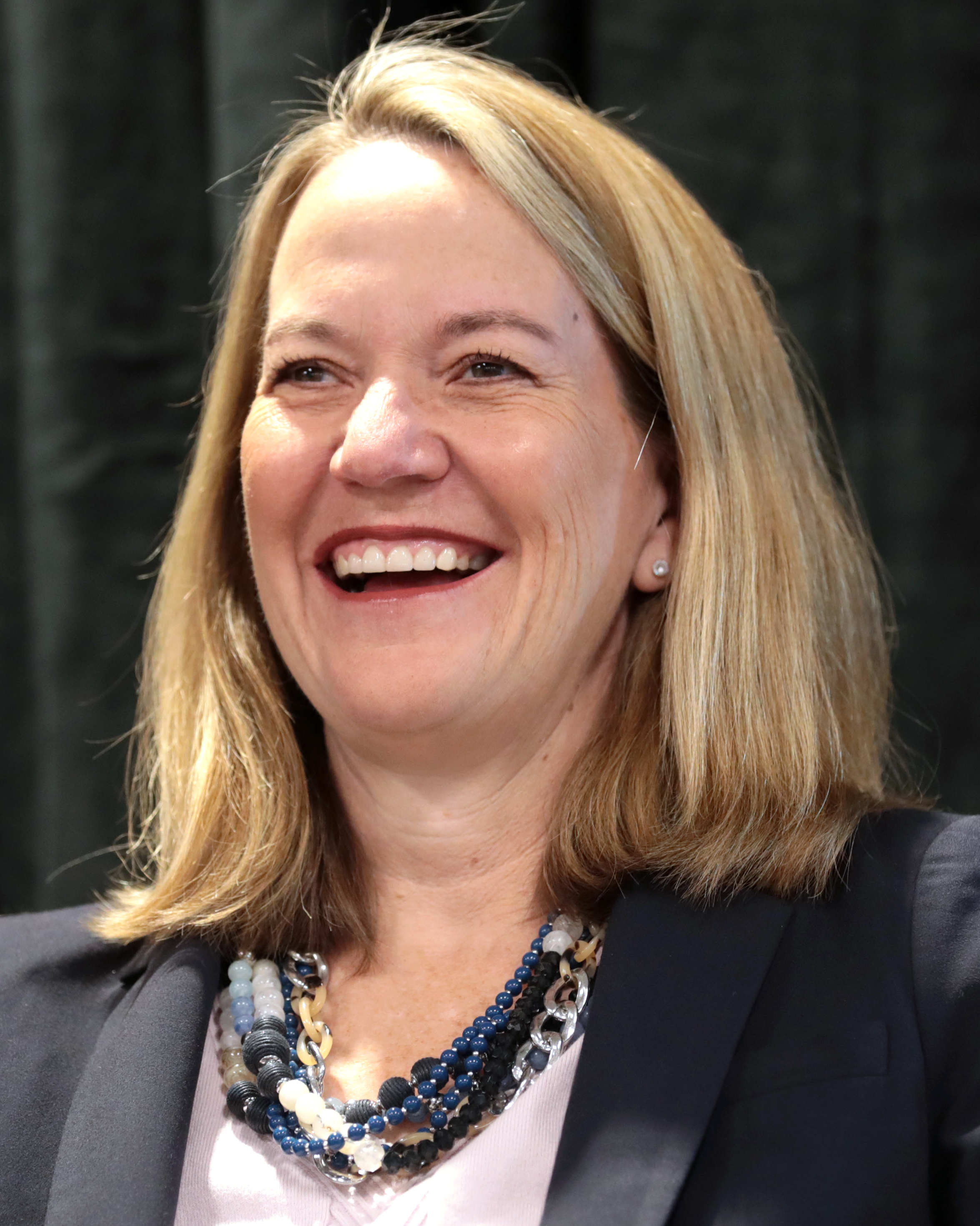
- Mayes in 2022

27th Attorney General of Arizona
- Incumbent
- Assumed office January 2, 2023
- Governor: Katie Hobbs
- Preceded by: Mark Brnovich

Chair of the Arizona Corporation Commission
- In office January 2009 – December 31, 2010
- Preceded by: Mike Gleason
- Succeeded by: Gary Pierce

Member of the Arizona Corporation Commission
- In office October 2003 – December 31, 2010
- Preceded by: James Irvin
- Succeeded by: Brenda Burns

Personal details
- Born: September 6, 1971 (age 55) Prescott, Arizona, U.S.
- Party: Republican (before 2019); Democratic (2019–present)
- Children: 1
- Education: Arizona State University, Tempe (BA, JD); Columbia University (MPA)
- Website: Office website Campaign website

Kristin Kay Mayes (born September 6, 1971) is an American lawyer, politician, and journalist who has been the 27th Arizona attorney general since 2023. A member of the Democratic Party, she was previously a professor of practice at Sandra Day O'Connor College of Law and chair of the Arizona Corporation Commission.

Mayes was first elected in 2022, defeating Republican nominee Abraham Hamadeh by 280 votes. She is the second woman elected to the office (after Janet Napolitano), the third openly lesbian woman elected state attorney general (after Maura Healey and Dana Nessel), and the second openly LGBT person elected to statewide office in Arizona (after Kyrsten Sinema).

== Early life and education ==
Mayes was born and raised in Prescott, Arizona. After graduating from Prescott High School she attended Arizona State University (ASU) on a scholarship from the Flinn Foundation. While attending ASU she served as editor in chief of the State Press, the university's newspaper. She graduated valedictorian from ASU with a degree in political science.

== Journalism career ==
Mayes worked as a general assignment reporter for the Phoenix Gazette, and later as a political reporter for The Arizona Republic, covering the Arizona State Legislature. Mayes then won the Harry S. Truman Scholarship and attended graduate school at Columbia University in New York, where she earned a Master of Public Administration.

Following graduate school, Mayes returned to The Arizona Republic, where she covered the 2000 presidential campaigns of Senator John McCain, former Vice President Dan Quayle, publisher Steve Forbes and Governor George W. Bush. From this experience, Mayes co-authored a book entitled Spin Priests: Campaign Advisors and the 2000 Race for the White House. After the presidential campaign, Mayes attended ASU College of Law and graduated magna cum laude.

== Early political career ==
Mayes was the press secretary for Janet Napolitano during the 2002 Arizona gubernatorial election.

=== Arizona Corporation Commission ===
Governor Napolitano appointed Mayes, then a Republican, to the Arizona Corporation Commission in October 2003. She devoted much of her effort towards pipeline safety, renewable energy and natural gas issues.

Mayes was elected to a full term in a 2004 special election, defeating Libertarian nominee Rick Fowlkes. In 2008, Mayes considered a candidacy for Arizona's 1st congressional district. She was term-limited in 2010 and was succeeded in her position by fellow Republican Brenda Burns.

In 2019, Mayes left the Republican Party and joined the Democratic Party, citing the expansion of Trumpism within the Republican Party.

== Arizona Attorney General ==
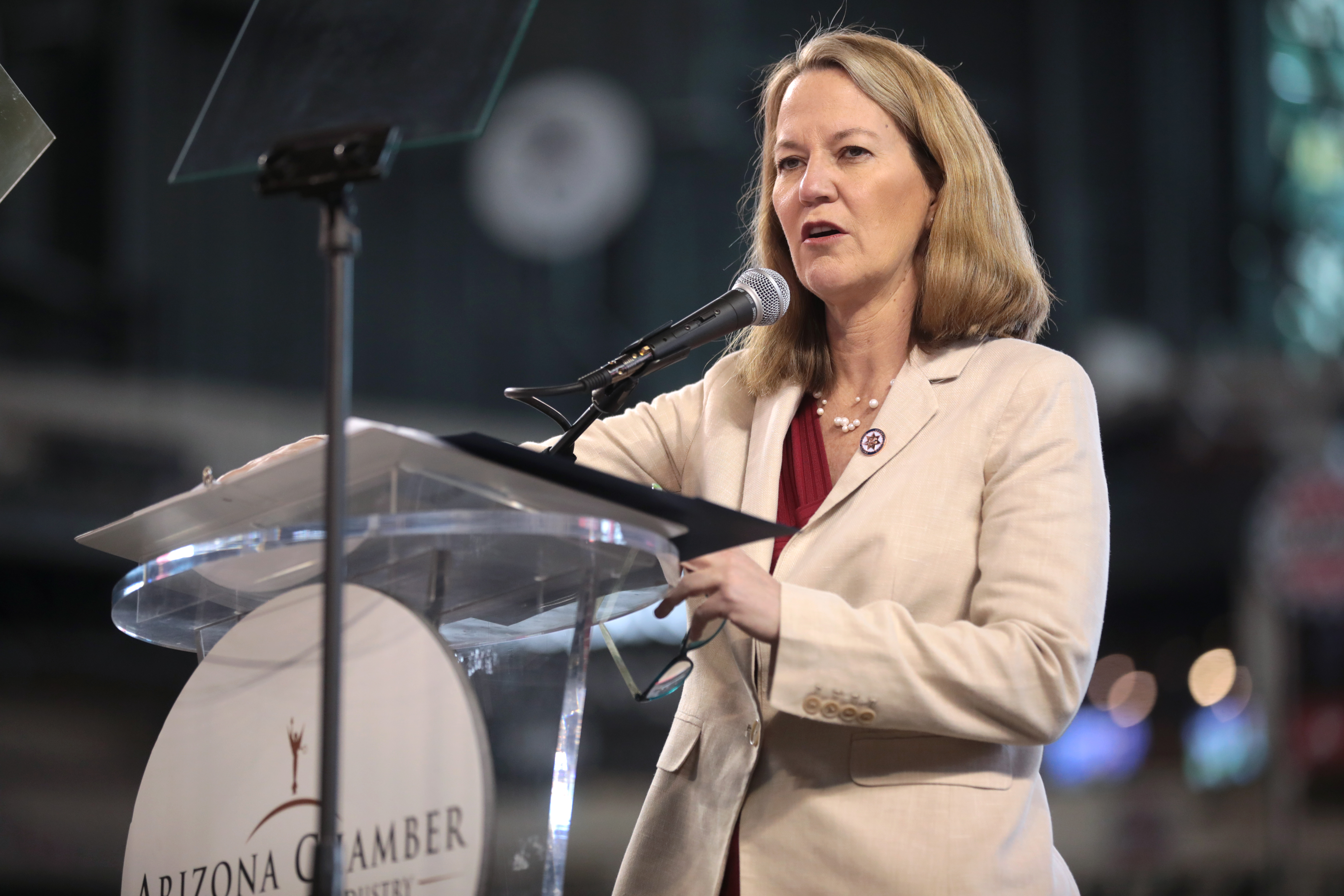
Mayes speaking at a 2023 event

=== 2022 election ===
Mayes was the Democratic nominee in the 2022 Arizona Attorney General election, running against Republican Abraham Hamadeh. The race was one of the closest in Arizona history and required a mandatory recount because the vote difference was significantly less than the 0.5% vote threshold required by state law for recounts. The recount started on December 5, 2022.

In the final vote tally, Mayes led by 510 votes. On December 29, Judge Timothy Thomason announced the results of the recount, confirming Mayes as the winner with a reduced margin of 280 votes.

=== Tenure ===
Mayes took office as Attorney General on January 2, 2023.

In January 2024, Mayes announced that the Attorney General's office would file suit against Kroger's proposed acquisition of Albertsons, citing antitrust laws. In June 2024, investigators from Mayes's office raided the Apache County Attorney's Office in connection to allegations of County Attorney Michael Whiting's "misuse of public monies" and "threatening and intimidating a political opponent".

On November 1, 2024, Donald Trump spoke at a rally in Arizona in which he said of former congresswoman Liz Cheney, "She's a radical war hawk. Let's put her with a rifle standing there with nine barrels shooting at her. Okay, let’s see how she feels about it. You know when the guns are trained on her face — you know, they’re all war hawks when they’re sitting in Washington in a nice building". That day, Mayes launched an investigation as to whether Trump's statement qualified as a prosecutable death threat under Arizona law.

Mayes supported Arizona's constitutional amendment codifying abortion rights.

=== Prosecution of 2020 fake electors ===
In July 2023, Mayes's office announced that it was "investigating the transmission of an alternative slate of electors" by allies of former President Donald Trump to be counted by Congress during the 2021 United States Electoral College vote count. Mayes's office indicted 18 individuals in April 2024.

=== Lawsuits against the Trump administration ===
As of October 2025, Mayes' office has filed 39 lawsuits against the Trump administration. Collectively, these lawsuits protected $1.5 billion in federal funds allocated to Arizona.

== Personal life ==
Mayes is openly lesbian and has a daughter, Hattie. Mayes is the second woman elected Arizona Attorney General (after Janet Napolitano), the third openly lesbian woman elected attorney general of a state in the United States (after Maura Healey and Dana Nessel), and the second openly LGBT person elected to statewide office in Arizona (after Kyrsten Sinema).

== Electoral history ==
2004 Arizona Corporation Commission special election
Party	Candidate	Votes	%
Republican	Kristin Mayes (incumbent)	1,175,778	74.90
Libertarian	Rick Fowlkes	394,078	25.10
Total votes		1,569,856	100.0
Republican hold			

2006 Arizona Corporation Commission general election
Party	Candidate	Votes	%
Republican	Kristin Mayes (incumbent)	653,344	26.1
Republican	Gary Pierce	638,466	25.5
Democratic	Richard Boyer	581,885	23.2
Democratic	Mark Manoil	541,562	21.6
Libertarian	Rick Fowlkes	91,684	3.7
Total votes		2,506,941	100.0

2022 Arizona Attorney General election
Party	Candidate	Votes	%	±%
Democratic	Kris Mayes	1,254,809	49.94%	+1.68%
Republican	Abraham Hamadeh	1,254,529	49.93%	−1.80%
Write-in		3,052	0.12%	+0.11%
Total votes		2,512,390	100.0%	
Democratic gain from Republican				

== See also ==
- List of female state attorneys general in the United States

== Notes ==
Political offices
Preceded by James Irvin	Member of the Arizona Corporation Commission; 2003–2010	Succeeded by Brenda Burns
Legal offices
Preceded by Mark Brnovich	Attorney General of Arizona; 2023–present	Incumbent
