= Paul Marsh (politician) =

American politician

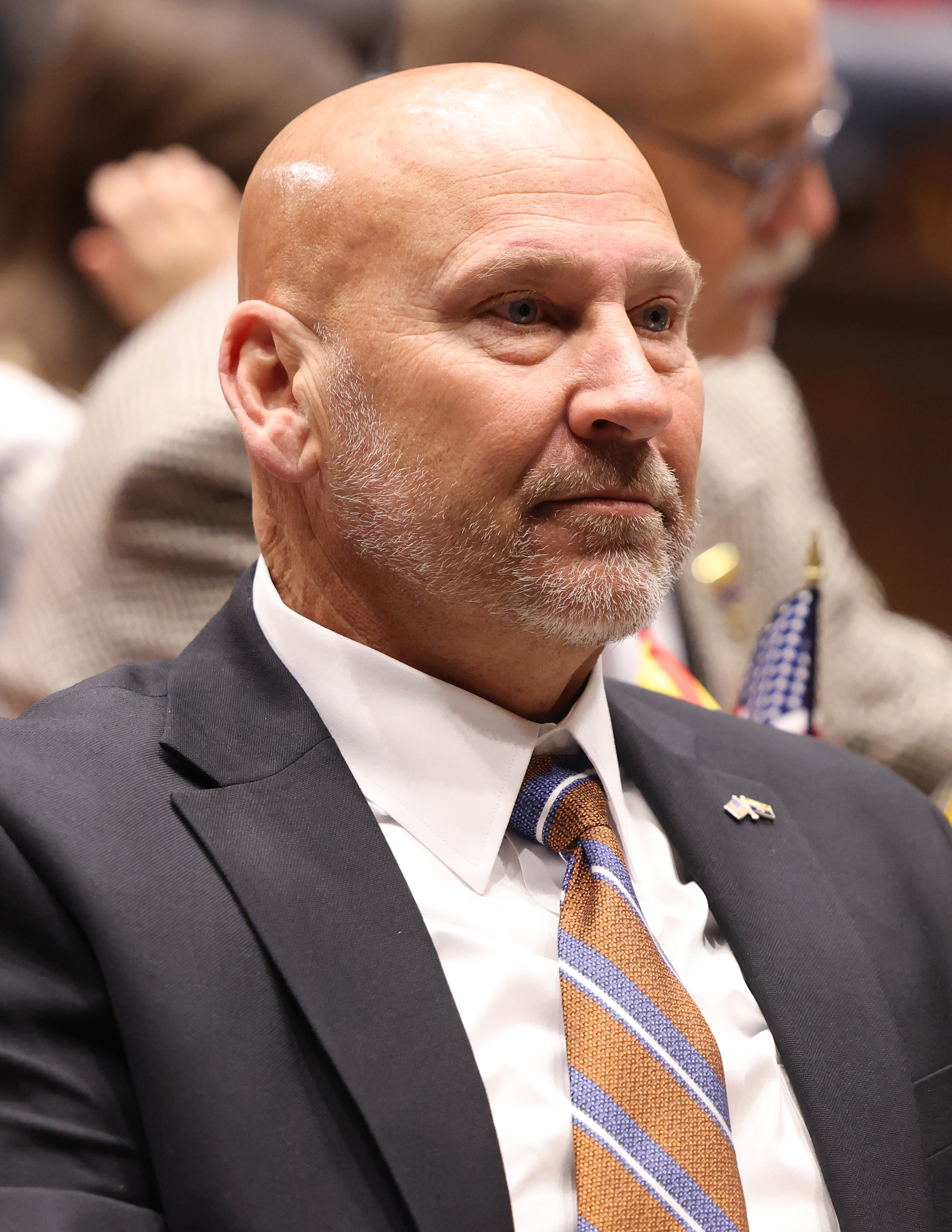
- Marsh in 2025

12th Mine Inspector of Arizona
- In office October 29, 2021 – August 15, 2025
- Governor: Doug Ducey; Katie Hobbs
- Preceded by: Joe Hart
- Succeeded by: Les Presmyk

Personal details
- Party: Republican

Military service
- Allegiance: United States
- Branch/service: United States Marine Corps
- Years of service: 1990–1997
- Unit: United States Marine Corps Reserve

Paul Marsh is an American mining executive and politician who served as the 12th Arizona State Mine Inspector. Governor Doug Ducey appointed Marsh to the position in October 2021, upon the resignation of Joe Hart. A member of the Republican Party, Marsh ran for a full term in the 2022 general election. On November 8, 2022, Marsh won the Mine Inspector election unopposed and resigned on August 15, 2025.

== Early life and education ==
Marsh was born and raised in Metro Phoenix and served in the Marine Corps Reserve from June 1990 to June 1997. In 2011, Marsh started working in the cement industry for CalPortland Company.

== Mine Inspector of Arizona ==
Marsh was appointed by Governor Doug Ducey in October 2021 to fill out the term of Joe Hart, upon his resignation. Marsh ran for a full-term as Mine Inspector and won unopposed.

Marsh resigned on August 15, 2025, after moving to Texas and starting a new job; however this was not revealed by the Mine Inspector's office until Governor Katie Hobbs appointed Les Presmyk a month later.

Political offices
Preceded by Joe Hart	Mine Inspector of Arizona; 2021–2025	Succeeded by Les Presmyk
