= Arizona State Mine Inspector =

State agency

State Mine Inspector of Arizona
- Incumbent; Les Presmyk since September 12, 2025
- Residence: Gilbert, Arizona
- Term length: Four years, can serve four terms
- Deputy: Tim Evans
- Website: Arizona State Mine Inspector

The Arizona State Mine Inspector is responsible for overseeing the safety and regulation of active and inactive mines in the state of Arizona in the United States. It is an independent, constitutionally-mandated office, elected to a four-year term. Arizona is the only state which fills this position through direct election. Arizona law states, "The state mine inspector shall have at least eight years' experience, four or more of which have been in this state, consisting of direct operational or management experience with mining operations at a mine and shall have knowledge of the state and federal regulations involving the health and safety of mining employees."

Arizona has 600 working mines and an estimated 120,000 abandoned mines. Owing to a lack of funding, the department employed just two abandoned-mine supervisors as of 2019.

Arizona House Representative Randall Friese introduced a bill in 2016 to change the position from elected to appointed. The bill failed to move out of committee.

In 2007, former inspector Douglas K. Martin was convicted of a felony conflict of interest from the illegal use of state vehicles and theft.

== Former inspectors ==
The election of a State Mine Inspector was originally to a two-year term between when the position was established in 1912 until the 1994 election; since then, State Mine Inspectors have been elected to four-year terms. Starting with 1994, election years typically coincide with the US midterm elections, most recently in 2026:

- G. H. Bolin, Democrat, 1912–1921
- John F. White, Republican, 1921–1923
- Tom C. Foster, Democrat, 1923–1945
- Clifford J. Murdock, Democrat, 1945–1953
- Edward Massey, Democrat, 1953–1959
- R. V. Hersey, Democrat, 1959–1965
- Verne C. McCutchan, Republican, 1965–1975
- Bert C. Romero, Democrat, 1975–1976
- Verne C. McCutchan, Republican, 1976–1978
- James H. McCutchan, Republican, 1979–1990
- Douglas K. Martin, Republican, 1991–2007
- Joe Hart, Republican, 2007–2021
- Paul Marsh, Republican, 2021–2025
- Les Presmyk, Republican, 2025–2027 (Note: Continuing the term of Paul Marsh following his resignation in 2025; lost election in the 2026 Arizona State Mine Inspector election)
- Brian Matlock, Democrat, inspector-elect (Note: Elected for the term 2027–2031)
