= 29th Arizona State Legislature =

Session of the Arizona Legislature

| ← | 28th | 30th | → |
- Arizona State Capitol (2014)

Overview
- Legislative body: Arizona State Legislature
- Jurisdiction: Arizona, United States
- Term: January 1, 1969 – December 31, 1970

Senate
- Members: 30
- Party control: Republican (17–13)

House of Representatives
- Members: 60
- Party control: Republican (34–26)

Sessions
- 1st: January 13 – April 11, 1969
- 2nd: January 12 – May 12, 1970

Special sessions
- 1st: January 5 – January 19, 1970

The 29th Arizona State Legislature, consisting of the Arizona State Senate and the Arizona House of Representatives, was constituted in Phoenix from January 1, 1969, to December 31, 1970, during Jack Williams' second term as Governor of Arizona. The number of senators remained constant at 30, and the members of the house of representatives also held steady at 60. The Republicans picked up a single seat in the Senate, giving them a 17–13 edge in the upper house, and the Republicans also gained one seat in the lower house, increasing their margin to 34–26.

== Sessions ==
The Legislature met for two regular sessions at the State Capitol in Phoenix. The first opened on January 13, 1969, and adjourned on April 11; while the second convened on January 12, 1970, and adjourned on May 12. There was a single Special Session, which convened on January 5, 1970, and adjourned sine die on January 19.

== State Senate ==
=== Members ===
The asterisk (*) denotes members of the previous Legislature who continued in office as members of this Legislature.

| District | Subdistrict | Senator | Party | Notes |
|---|---|---|---|---|
| 1 - Mohave and Yavapai Counties | N/A | Boyd Tenney* | Republican | |
| 2 - Cochise, Graham and Santa Cruz Counties | N/A | James A. Elliot | Democrat | |
| 2 - Cochise, Graham and Santa Cruz Counties | N/A | James F. McNulty Jr. | Democrat | |
| 3 - Apache, Navajo and Greenlee Counties | N/A | Frank L. Crosby | Democrat | |
| 3 - Apache, Navajo and Greenlee Counties | N/A | William Huso* | Democrat | |
| 4 - Coconino County | N/A | Thomas N. Knoles Jr.* | Democrat | |
| 5 - Gila, and Pinal Counties | N/A | A. V. (Bill) Hardt | Democrat | |
| 5 - Gila, and Pinal Counties | N/A | E. B. (Blodie) Thode* | Democrat | |
| 6 - Yuma County | N/A | Harold C. Giss* | Democrat | |
| 7 - Pima County, Arizona | 7-A | Joe Castillo* | Democrat | |
| 7 - Pima County, Arizona | 7-B | F. T. "Limie" Gibbings* | Democrat | |
| 7 - Pima County, Arizona | 7-C | Sam Lena | Democrat | |
| 7 - Pima County, Arizona | 7-D | Douglas S. Holsclaw* | Republican | |
| 7 - Pima County, Arizona | 7-E | Ken Cardella* | Republican | |
| 7 - Pima County, Arizona | 7-F | William C. Jacquin* | Republican | |
| 8 - Maricopa County, Arizona | 8-A | James F. Holley | Republican | |
| 8 - Maricopa County, Arizona | 8-B | William Porter* | Republican | |
| 8 - Maricopa County, Arizona | 8-C | John B. Conlan* | Republican | |
| 8 - Maricopa County, Arizona | 8-D | David B. Kret* | Republican | |
| 8 - Maricopa County, Arizona | 8-E | Isabel Burgess* | Republican | |
| 8 - Maricopa County, Arizona | 8-E | Sandra Day O'Connor** | Republican | |
| 8 - Maricopa County, Arizona | 8-F | Mike Farren | Republican | |
| 8 - Maricopa County, Arizona | 8-G | Cloves Campbell Sr.* | Democrat | |
| 8 - Maricopa County, Arizona | 8-H | Orme Lewis Jr.* | Republican | |
| 8 - Maricopa County, Arizona | 8-I | Somers White | Republican | |
| 8 - Maricopa County, Arizona | 8-J | Bob Wilcox* | Republican | |
| 8 - Maricopa County, Arizona | 8-K | Ray A. Goetze* | Republican | |
| 8 - Maricopa County, Arizona | 8-L | Christopher T. Johnson* | Republican | |
| 8 - Maricopa County, Arizona | 8-M | Terry Jones | Republican | |
| 8 - Maricopa County, Arizona | 8-N | Bob Stump* | Democrat | |
| 8 - Maricopa County, Arizona | 8-O | Dan Halacy* | Republican | |

The ** denotes that O'Connor was appointed t replace Burgess when Burgess left to take a position in the Richard M. Nixon administration.

== House of Representatives ==
=== Members ===
The asterisk (*) denotes members of the previous Legislature who continued in office as members of this Legislature.

| District | Subdistrict | Representative | Party | Notes |
|---|---|---|---|---|
| 1 - Mohave and Yavapai Counties | N/A | Gladys Gardner* | Republican | |
| 1 - Mohave and Yavapai Counties | N/A | Ray Everett | Republican | |
| 2 - Cochise, Graham and Santa Cruz Counties | N/A | W. L. "Tay" Cook* | Democrat | |
| 2 - Cochise, Graham and Santa Cruz Counties | N/A | H. F. (Hank) Fenn | Democrat | |
| 2 - Cochise, Graham and Santa Cruz Counties | N/A | Richard Pacheco | Democrat | |
| 2 - Cochise, Graham and Santa Cruz Counties | N/A | Ed Sawyer* | Democrat | |
| 3 - Apache, Navajo and Greenlee Counties | N/A | Jack A. Brown* | Democrat | |
| 3 - Apache, Navajo and Greenlee Counties | N/A | G. O. "Sonny" Biles* | Democrat | |
| 3 - Apache, Navajo and Greenlee Counties | N/A | Boyd A. Shumway | Democrat | |
| 3 - Apache, Navajo and Greenlee Counties | N/A | Lynn Tanner | Democrat | |
| 4 - Coconino County | N/A | Harold L. Huffer* | Democrat | |
| 4 - Coconino County | N/A | Sam A. McConnell Jr.* | Republican | |
| 5 - Gila, and Pinal Counties | N/A | Polly Getswiller* | Democrat | |
| 5 - Gila, and Pinal Counties | N/A | Craig E. Davids | Democrat | |
| 5 - Gila, and Pinal Counties | N/A | E. C. "Polly" Rosenbaum* | Democrat | |
| 5 - Gila, and Pinal Counties | N/A | Frederick S. Smith* | Democrat | |
| 6 - Yuma County | N/A | Charles A. Johnson* | Democrat | |
| 6 - Yuma County | N/A | M. G. "Pop" Miniken* | Democrat | |
| 7 - Pima County, Arizona | 7-A | Bernardo M. Cajero | Democrat | |
| 7 - Pima County, Arizona | 7-A | Emmett S. (Bud) Walker* | Democrat | |
| 7 - Pima County, Arizona | 7-B | Etta Mae Hutcheson* | Democrat | |
| 7 - Pima County, Arizona | 7-B | Ethel Maynard* | Democrat | |
| 7 - Pima County, Arizona | 7-C | R. P. "Bob" Fricks | Democrat | |
| 7 - Pima County, Arizona | 7-C | J. H. (Jim) Dewberry Jr. | Democrat | |
| 7 - Pima County, Arizona | 7-D | John H. Haugh | Republican | |
| 7 - Pima County, Arizona | 7-D | Thomas N. Goodwin* | Republican | |
| 7 - Pima County, Arizona | 7-E | Albert C. Williams* | Republican | |
| 7 - Pima County, Arizona | 7-E | David B. Stone* | Republican | |
| 7 - Pima County, Arizona | 7-F | W. A. "Tony" Buehl* | Republican | |
| 7 - Pima County, Arizona | 7-F | Scott Alexander* | Republican | |
| 8 - Maricopa County, Arizona | 8-A | Walter E. Bloom* | Republican | |
| 8 - Maricopa County, Arizona | 8-A | James J. Sossaman | Republican | |
| 8 - Maricopa County, Arizona | 8-B | Stan Turley* | Republican | |
| 8 - Maricopa County, Arizona | 8-B | Jim L. Cooper | Republican | |
| 8 - Maricopa County, Arizona | 8-C | Sam Flake* | Republican | |
| 8 - Maricopa County, Arizona | 8-C | Peter Kay | Republican | |
| 8 - Maricopa County, Arizona | 8-D | Frank Kelley* | Republican | |
| 8 - Maricopa County, Arizona | 8-D | James Shelley* | Republican | |
| 8 - Maricopa County, Arizona | 8-E | Ruth Adams* | Republican | |
| 8 - Maricopa County, Arizona | 8-E | John D. Roeder* | Republican | |
| 8 - Maricopa County, Arizona | 8-F | Renz D. Jennings | Democrat | |
| 8 - Maricopa County, Arizona | 8-F | D. Lee Jones* | Republican | |
| 8 - Maricopa County, Arizona | 8-G | Tony Abril* | Democrat | |
| 8 - Maricopa County, Arizona | 8-G | Leon Thompson* | Democrat | |
| 8 - Maricopa County, Arizona | 8-H | Elizabeth Adams Rockwell* | Republican | |
| 8 - Maricopa County, Arizona | 8-H | Jay Stuckey* | Republican | |
| 8 - Maricopa County, Arizona | 8-I | Burton S. Barr* | Republican | |
| 8 - Maricopa County, Arizona | 8-I | Ruth Peck* | Republican | |
| 8 - Maricopa County, Arizona | 8-J | Stan Akers* | Republican | |
| 8 - Maricopa County, Arizona | 8-J | Timothy A. Barrow* | Republican | |
| 8 - Maricopa County, Arizona | 8-K | Stuart Schoenburg | Republican | |
| 8 - Maricopa County, Arizona | 8-K | George J. Pale* | Republican | |
| 8 - Maricopa County, Arizona | 8-L | Don Stewart | Republican | |
| 8 - Maricopa County, Arizona | 8-L | Joseph Shaughnessy Jr.* | Republican | |
| 8 - Maricopa County, Arizona | 8-M | Edward C. Andrews | Republican | |
| 8 - Maricopa County, Arizona | 8-M | Bess B. Stinson* | Republican | |
| 8 - Maricopa County, Arizona | 8-N | Art Coppinger* | Democrat | |
| 8 - Maricopa County, Arizona | 8-N | Manuel "Lito" Pena* | Democrat | |
| 8 - Maricopa County, Arizona | 8-O | C. W. "Bill" Lewis | Republican | |
| 8 - Maricopa County, Arizona | 8-O | Fred Koory Jr.* | Republican | |
