= 28th Arizona State Legislature =

Session of the Arizona Legislature

←	27th	29th	→
- Arizona State Capitol (2014)

Overview
- Legislative body: Arizona State Legislature
- Jurisdiction: Arizona, United States
- Term: January 1, 1967 – December 31, 1968

Senate
- Members: 30
- Party control: Republican (16–14)

House of Representatives
- Members: 60
- Party control: Republican (33–27)

Sessions
- 1st: January 9 – March 13, 1967
- 2nd: January 8 – March 21, 1968

Special sessions
- 1st: May 31 – June 2, 1967
- 2nd: October 30 – November 17, 1967
- 3rd: November 27 – December 22, 1967
- 4th: May 8 – June 7, 1968

The 28th Arizona State Legislature, consisting of the Arizona State Senate and the Arizona House of Representatives, was constituted in Phoenix from January 1, 1967, to December 31, 1968, during Jack Williams' first term as Governor of Arizona. The make-up of both houses was changed drastically by the implementation of districts, rather than the old system of county representation. The fourteen counties were broken up into 8 districts. Four of the districts (1, 2, 3, and 5) consisted of multiple counties, while the other four (4, 6, 7, and 8) represented single counties. In addition, Districts Seven and Eight, representing Pima and Maricopa Counties respectively, were further broken down into sub-districts. District 7 had eight sub-districts, 7-A through 7-F, while District 8 had fifteen sub-districts, 8-A through 8-O. The number of senators increased to 30, with the balance of power shifting drastically. Where Democrats had held a 26–2 majority in the prior legislature, Republicans now held a slim 16–14 majority. While the number of senators increased, the number of representatives decreased from 80 to 60. Again, the balance of power shifted to the Republicans, who now held 33–27 majority in the lower house. It was the first time Arizona history where the Republicans won control of both houses of the legislature.

== Sessions ==
The Legislature met for two regular sessions at the State Capitol in Phoenix. The first opened on January 9, 1967, and adjourned on March 13; while the second convened on January 8, 1968, and adjourned on March 21. There were four Special Sessions, three in 1967, and the last one in 1968. The first Special Session convened May 31, 1967, and adjourned sine die on June 2; the second convened on October 30, 1967, and adjourned sine die on November 17; the Third Special Session convened on November 27, 1967, and adjourned sine die on December 22; with the final Special Session, the fourth, convened May 8, 1968 and adjourned sine die on June 7.

== State Senate ==
=== Members ===
The asterisk (*) denotes members of the previous Legislature who continued in office as members of this Legislature.

District	Subdistrict	Senator	Party	Notes
1 - Mohave and Yavapai Counties	N/A	Boyd Tenney*	Republican	
2 - Cochise, Graham and Santa Cruz Counties	N/A	A. R. Spikes*	Democrat	
2 - Cochise, Graham and Santa Cruz Counties	N/A	Dan S. Kitchel*	Democrat	
3 - Apache, Navajo and Greenlee Counties	N/A	Glenn Blansett*	Democrat	
3 - Apache, Navajo and Greenlee Counties	N/A	William Huso*	Democrat	
4 - Coconino County	N/A	Thomas N. Knoles Jr.*	Democrat	
5 - Gila, and Pinal Counties	N/A	Clarence L. Carpenter*	Democrat	
5 - Gila, and Pinal Counties	N/A	Johnny Gregovich**	Democrat	
5 - Gila, and Pinal Counties	N/A	E. B. "Blodie" Thode*	Democrat	
6 - Yuma County	N/A	Harold C. Giss*	Democrat	
7 - Pima County, Arizona	7-A	Joe Castillo	Democrat	
7 - Pima County, Arizona	7-B	F. T. "Limie" Gibbings	Democrat	
7 - Pima County, Arizona	7-C	Ernest Garfield	Republican	
7 - Pima County, Arizona	7-D	Douglas S. Holsclaw	Republican	
7 - Pima County, Arizona	7-E	Thomas G. Beaham	Republican	
7 - Pima County, Arizona	7-E	Kenneth C. Cardella***	Republican	
7 - Pima County, Arizona	7-F	William C. Jacquin	Republican	
8 - Maricopa County, Arizona	8-A	Marshall Humphrey	Republican	
8 - Maricopa County, Arizona	8-B	William Porter	Republican	
8 - Maricopa County, Arizona	8-C	John B. Conlan	Republican	
8 - Maricopa County, Arizona	8-D	David B. Kret	Republican	
8 - Maricopa County, Arizona	8-E	Isabel Burgess	Republican	
8 - Maricopa County, Arizona	8-F	Wing F. Ong	Democrat	
8 - Maricopa County, Arizona	8-G	Cloves Campbell Sr.	Democrat	
8 - Maricopa County, Arizona	8-H	Orme Lewis Jr.	Republican	
8 - Maricopa County, Arizona	8-I	Chet Goldberg Jr.	Republican	
8 - Maricopa County, Arizona	8-J	Bob Wilcox	Republican	
8 - Maricopa County, Arizona	8-K	Ray A. Goetze	Republican	
8 - Maricopa County, Arizona	8-L	Christopher T. Johnson	Republican	
8 - Maricopa County, Arizona	8-M	William T. Crowley	Democrat	
8 - Maricopa County, Arizona	8-N	Bob Stump	Democrat	
8 - Maricopa County, Arizona	8-O	Dan Halacy	Republican	

- The ** denotes Carpenter was elected and died in office, Gregovich was appointed to replace him
- The *** denotes Beaham was elected and died in office, Cardella was appointed to replace him

== House of Representatives ==
=== Members ===
The asterisk (*) denotes members of the previous Legislature who continued in office as members of this Legislature.

District	Subdistrict	Representative	Party	Notes
1 - Mohave and Yavapai Counties	N/A	Gladys Gardner*	Republican	
1 - Mohave and Yavapai Counties	N/A	William D. Lyman*	Republican	
2 - Cochise, Graham and Santa Cruz Counties	N/A	W. L. "Tay" Cook*	Democrat	
2 - Cochise, Graham and Santa Cruz Counties	N/A	James A. Elliott*	Democrat	
2 - Cochise, Graham and Santa Cruz Counties	N/A	A. L. "Fat" Hawes	Democrat	
2 - Cochise, Graham and Santa Cruz Counties	N/A	Ed Sawyer	Democrat	
3 - Apache, Navajo and Greenlee Counties	N/A	Jack A. Brown*	Democrat	
3 - Apache, Navajo and Greenlee Counties	N/A	Frank L. Crosby*	Democrat	
3 - Apache, Navajo and Greenlee Counties	N/A	Lloyd L. House	Democrat	
3 - Apache, Navajo and Greenlee Counties	N/A	Clay B. Simer*	Democrat	
3 - Apache, Navajo and Greenlee Counties	N/A	G. 0. (Sonny) Biles***	Democrat	
4 - Coconino County	N/A	Harold L. Huffer	Democrat	
4 - Coconino County	N/A	Sam A. McConnell Jr.	Republican	
5 - Gila, and Pinal Counties	N/A	Polly Getswiller*	Democrat	
5 - Gila, and Pinal Counties	N/A	A. V. "Bill" Hardt	Democrat	
5 - Gila, and Pinal Counties	N/A	E. C. "Polly" Rosenbaum*	Democrat	
5 - Gila, and Pinal Counties	N/A	Frederick S. Smith*	Democrat	
6 - Yuma County	N/A	Charles A. Johnson*	Democrat	
6 - Yuma County	N/A	M. G. "Pop" Miniken*	Democrat	
7 - Pima County, Arizona	7-A	Tony Carrillo*	Democrat	
7 - Pima County, Arizona	7-A	Emmett S. (Bud) Walker*	Democrat	
7 - Pima County, Arizona	7-B	Etta Mae Hutcheson*	Democrat	
7 - Pima County, Arizona	7-B	Ethel Maynard	Democrat	
7 - Pima County, Arizona	7-C	R. P. "Bob" Fricks	Democrat	
7 - Pima County, Arizona	7-C	Sam Lena*	Democrat	
7 - Pima County, Arizona	7-D	Richard E. Bailey	Republican	
7 - Pima County, Arizona	7-D	Thomas N. Goodwin	Republican	
7 - Pima County, Arizona	7-E	Albert C. Williams	Republican	
7 - Pima County, Arizona	7-E	David B. Stone	Republican	
7 - Pima County, Arizona	7-F	W. A. "Tony" Buehl*	Republican	
7 - Pima County, Arizona	7-F	Scott Alexander*	Republican	
8 - Maricopa County, Arizona	8-A	Walter E. Bloom	Republican	
8 - Maricopa County, Arizona	8-A	James F. Holley	Republican	
8 - Maricopa County, Arizona	8-B	Stan Turley	Republican	
8 - Maricopa County, Arizona	8-B	D. Delos Ellsworth	Republican	
8 - Maricopa County, Arizona	8-C	Sam Flake	Republican	
8 - Maricopa County, Arizona	8-C	John C. Pritzlaff	Republican	
8 - Maricopa County, Arizona	8-D	Frank Kelley*	Republican	
8 - Maricopa County, Arizona	8-D	James Shelley*	Republican	
8 - Maricopa County, Arizona	8-E	Ruth Adams*	Republican	
8 - Maricopa County, Arizona	8-E	John D. Roeder	Republican	
8 - Maricopa County, Arizona	8-F	W. F. "Pat" Vipperman	Democrat	
8 - Maricopa County, Arizona	8-F	D. Lee Jones	Republican	
8 - Maricopa County, Arizona	8-G	Tony Abril	Democrat	
8 - Maricopa County, Arizona	8-G	Leon Thompson	Democrat	
8 - Maricopa County, Arizona	8-H	Elizabeth Adams Rockwell*	Republican	
8 - Maricopa County, Arizona	8-H	Jay Stuckey	Republican	
8 - Maricopa County, Arizona	8-I	Burton S. Barr	Republican	
8 - Maricopa County, Arizona	8-I	Ruth Peck	Republican	
8 - Maricopa County, Arizona	8-J	Stan Akers	Republican	
8 - Maricopa County, Arizona	8-J	Timothy A. Barrow	Republican	
8 - Maricopa County, Arizona	8-K	Davidson Jenks	Republican	
8 - Maricopa County, Arizona	8-K	Al Faron****	Republican	
8 - Maricopa County, Arizona	8-K	George J. Pale	Republican	
8 - Maricopa County, Arizona	8-L	Rex J. Farley	Republican	
8 - Maricopa County, Arizona	8-L	Joseph Shaughnessy Jr.	Republican	
8 - Maricopa County, Arizona	8-M	J. R. "Bob" Rickard	Democrat	
8 - Maricopa County, Arizona	8-M	Bess B. Stinson	Republican	
8 - Maricopa County, Arizona	8-N	Art Coppinger	Democrat	
8 - Maricopa County, Arizona	8-N	Manuel "Lito" Pena	Democrat	
8 - Maricopa County, Arizona	8-O	Al Kluender	Republican	
8 - Maricopa County, Arizona	8-O	Fred Koory Jr.	Republican	

The *** denotes that Clay B. Simer was elected, but resigned. Biles, who had served in the prior legislature, was appointed to succeed him. The **** denotes that Davidson Jenks was elected, but resigned and Faron was appointed to replace him.
