= Arizona's 4th legislative district =

American legislative district

- Map of District 4: Approved January 21, 2022
- Senator: Carine Werner (R)
- House members: Matt Gress (R); Pamela Carter (R)
- Registration: 39.76% Republican; 26.43% Democratic; 32.28% Other
- Demographics: 77% White; 2% Black/African American; 1% Native American; 8% Asian; 10% Hispanic
- Population: 244,298
- Voting-age population: 200,823
- Registered voters: 168,929

Arizona's 4th legislative district is one of 30 legislative districts in the U.S. state of Arizona. It encompasses a portion of Maricopa County, including part of Scottsdale and the community of Paradise Valley.

The district is represented in the 57th Arizona State Legislature by Carine Werner in the Arizona Senate and Matt Gress and Pamela Carter in the Arizona House of Representatives, all Republicans.

According to the Arizona Independent Redistricting Commission (AIRC), District 4 is highly competitive. Following the 2020 United States census, the district had a total population of 244,298.

== Political representation ==
=== Arizona Senate ===
Name	Party	Term	Legislature	Notes
District created January 22, 1970
John W. McLaughlin	Democratic	1961–1972	30th	
A. V. "Bill" Hardt	Democratic	1973–1996	31st 32nd 33rd 34th 35th 36th 37th 38th 39th 40th 41st 42nd	
Jack A. Brown	Democratic	1997–2002	43rd 44th 45th	
Jack W. Harper	Republican	2003–2010	46th 47th 48th 49th	
Scott Bundgaard	Republican	2011–2012	50th	
Lynne Pancrazi	Democratic	2013–2016	51st 52nd	
Lisa Otondo	Democratic	2017–2022	53rd 54th 55th	
Christine Marsh	Democratic	2023–2024	56th	
Carine Werner	Republican	since 2025	57th	

=== Arizona House of Representatives ===
Name	Party	Term	Legislature	Notes
District created January 22, 1970
G.O. "Sonny" Biles	Democratic	1955–1972	30th	(Note: Biles previously served as a member of the 22nd, 23rd, 24th, 25th, 26th, and 27th Legislatures as a state representative representing Greenlee County and in the 28th and 29th Legislatures as a state representative representing Apache, Greenlee, and Navajo Counties.)
Jack A. Brown	Democratic	1963–1972, 1987–1996	30th 38th 39th 40th 41st 42nd	(Note: Brown previously served as a member of the 26th and 27th Legislatures as the sole state representative representing Apache County and in the 28th and 29th Legislatures as a state representative representing Apache, Greenlee, and Navajo Counties.)
E. C. "Polly" Rosenbaum	Democratic	1973–1994	31st 32nd 33rd 34th 35th 36th 37th 38th 39th 40th 41st	
Edward G. Guerrero	Democratic	1973–1986	31st 32nd 33rd 34th 35th 36th 37th	
Dave Farnsworth	Republican	1995–1996	42nd	
Debra Brimhall	Republican	1997–2002	43rd 44th 45th	
Jake Flake	Republican	1997–2002	43rd 44th 45th	
Tom Boone	Republican	2003–2010	46th 47th 48th 49th	
Carole Hubs	Republican	2003–2004	46th	
Judy Burges	Republican	2005–2012	47th 48th 49th 50th	
Jack W. Harper	Republican	2011–2012	50th	
Lisa Otondo	Democratic	2013–2016	51st 52nd	
Juan Carlos Escamilla	Democratic	2013–2014	51st	
Charlene Fernandez	Democratic	2013–2021	52nd 53rd 54th 55th	(Note: Resigned November 15, 2021.)
Jesus Rubalcava	Democratic	2017	53rd	(Note: Resigned July 19, 2017.)
Geraldine Peten	Democratic	2017–2020	53rd 54th	(Note: Appointed to fill Rubalcava's seat on August 16, 2017. Re-elected in 2018.)
Brian Fernandez	Democratic	2021–2022	55th	(Note: Appointed to fill C. Fernandez's seat on November 22, 2021.)
Joel John	Republican	2021–2022	55th	
Matt Gress	Republican	since 2023	56th 57th	
Laura Terech	Democratic	2023–2024	56th	
Pamela Carter	Republican	since 2025	57th	

== Election results ==
Following the 2020 United States redistricting cycle, the AIRC redrew legislative boundaries in Arizona. The 2022 elections were the first held in the newly redrawn District 4.

=== Arizona Senate ===
2026 Arizona Senate election, 4th district
Party	Candidate	Votes	%
Democratic	Aaron Lieberman		
Republican	Carine Werner (incumbent)		
Democratic gain from Republican			

2024 Arizona Senate election, 4th district
Party	Candidate	Votes	%
Republican	Carine Werner	79,079	51.86
Democratic	Christine Marsh (incumbent)	70,614	48.14
Total votes		146,693	100.00
Republican gain from Democratic			

2022 Arizona Senate election, 4th district
Party	Candidate	Votes	%
Democratic	Christine Marsh	62,205	50.48
Republican	Nancy Barto	61,016	49.52
Total votes		123,221	100.00

=== Arizona House of Representatives ===
2026 Arizona House of Representatives election, 4th district
Party	Candidate	Votes	%
Democratic	Tammy Caputi		
Democratic	Karen Gresham		
Republican	Matt Gress (incumbent)		
Republican	Pamela Carter (incumbent)		
Democratic gain from Republican			
Democratic gain from Republican			

2024 Arizona House of Representatives election, 4th district
Party	Candidate	Votes	%
Republican	Matt Gress (incumbent)	75,669	27.50
Republican	Pamela Carter	69,077	25.10
Democratic	Kelli Butler	66,407	24.13
Democratic	Karen Gresham	64,038	23.27
Total votes		275,191	100.00
Republican hold			
Republican gain from Democratic			

2022 Arizona House of Representatives election, 4th district
Party	Candidate	Votes	%
Republican	Matt Gress	61,527	34.72
Democratic	Laura Terech	59,292	33.46
Republican	Maria Syms	56,383	31.82
Total votes		177,202	100.00

== See also ==
- List of Arizona legislative districts
- Arizona State Legislature
