= 30th Arizona State Legislature =

Session of the Arizona Legislature

←	29th	31st	→
- Arizona State Capitol (2014)

Overview
- Legislative body: Arizona State Legislature
- Jurisdiction: Arizona, United States
- Term: January 1, 1971 – December 31, 1972

Senate
- Members: 30
- Party control: Republican (18–12)

House of Representatives
- Members: 60
- Party control: Republican (34–26)

Sessions
- 1st: January 11 – May 14, 1971
- 2nd: January 10 – May 14, 1972

Special sessions
- 1st: September 27 – October 21, 1971

The 30th Arizona State Legislature, consisting of the Arizona State Senate and the Arizona House of Representatives, was constituted in Phoenix from January 1, 1971, to December 31, 1972, during the first two years of Jack Williams' third term as Governor of Arizona. Due to a state constitutional amendment, the election of 1970 was the first in Arizona with a four-year term for the governor. The legislature remained at two-year terms. While the number of senators remained constant at 30 and the members of the house of representatives held steady at 60, the structure of the legislature changed. In the prior legislature, it had been broken into 8 districts, with two of those districts (districts 7 and 8) further broken down into sub-districts (6 and 15 sub-districts, respectively). Beginning with this legislature, the structure was changed to 30 districts, with a single senator and two representatives from each district. The Republicans picked up a single seat in the Senate, giving them an 18–12 edge in the upper house, while the balance in the lower house remained with a Republican edge of 34–26.

== Sessions ==
The Legislature met for two regular sessions at the State Capitol in Phoenix. The first opened on January 11, 1971, and adjourned on May 14; while the second convened on January 10, 1972, and adjourned on May 14. There was a single Special Session, which convened on September 27, 1971, and adjourned on October 21.

== State Senate ==
=== Members ===
The asterisk (*) denotes members of the previous Legislature who continued in office as members of this Legislature.

District	Senator	Party	Notes
1 - Maricopa, Mohave, Yavapai, and Yuma Counties	Boyd Tenney*	Republican	
2 - Coconino, Mohave and Yavapai Counties	Thomas N. Knoles Jr.*	Democrat	
3 - Apache, Navajo, Gila and Graham Counties	Roy Palmer	Republican	
4 - Apache, Graham, Greenlee and Navajo Counties	John W. McLaughlin	Democrat	
5 - Maricopa, and Yuma Counties	Harold C. Giss*	Democrat	
6 - Maricopa, and Pinal Counties	E. B. (Blodie) Thode*	Democrat	
7 - Gila, and Pinal Counties	A. V. (Bill) Hardt*	Democrat	
8 - Cochise, Graham, and Pinal Counties	Charles Awalt	Democrat	
9 - Cochise, Pima, and Santa Cruz Counties	James F. McNulty Jr.*	Democrat	
10 - Pima, and Yuma Counties	Joe Castillo*	Democrat	
11 - Pima County	F. T. "Limie" Gibbings*	Democrat	
12 - Pima County	Sam Lena*	Democrat	
13 - Pima County	Douglas S. Holsclaw*	Republican	
14 - Pima County	Scott Alexander	Republican	
15 - Pima County	William C. Jacquin*	Republican	
16 - Maricopa County	Fred Koory Jr.	Republican	
17 - Maricopa County	Ray A. Goetze*	Republican	
18 - Maricopa County	Joe Shaughnessy Jr.	Republican	
19 - Maricopa County	Ray Rottas	Republican	
20 - Maricopa County	Sandra Day O'Connor*	Republican	
21 - Maricopa County	John B. Conlan*	Republican	
22 - Maricopa County	Bess B. Stinson	Republican	
23 - Maricopa County	Leo Corbet	Republican	
24 - Maricopa County	Howard S. Baldwin	Republican	
25 - Maricopa County	Trudy Camping	Republican	
26 - Maricopa County	David B. Kret*	Republican	
27 - Maricopa County	Bob Stump*	Democrat	
28 - Maricopa County	Cloves Campbell Sr.*	Democrat	
29 - Maricopa County	James A. Mack	Republican	
30 - Maricopa County	D. Delos Ellsworth	Republican	

== House of Representatives ==
=== Members ===
The asterisk (*) denotes members of the previous Legislature who continued in office as members of this Legislature.

District	Representative	Party	Notes
1 - Maricopa, Mohave, Yavapai, and Yuma Counties	Gladys Gardner*	Republican	
1 - Maricopa, Mohave, Yavapai, and Yuma Counties	Ray Everett*	Republican	
2 - Coconino, Mohave and Yavapai Counties	Harold L. Huffer*	Democrat	
2 - Coconino, Mohave and Yavapai Counties	Sam A. McConnell Jr.*	Republican	
3 - Apache, Navajo, Gila and Graham Counties	Boyd A. Shumway*	Democrat	
3 - Apache, Navajo, Gila and Graham Counties	Glen L. Flake	Democrat	
4 - Apache, Graham, Greenlee and Navajo Counties	G. O. "Sonny" Biles*	Democrat	
4 - Apache, Graham, Greenlee and Navajo Counties	Jack A. Brown*	Democrat	
5 - Maricopa, and Yuma Counties	Elwood W. Bradford	Democrat	
5 - Maricopa, and Yuma Counties	Jones Osborn	Democrat	
6 - Maricopa, and Pinal Counties	Craig E. Davids	Democrat	
6 - Maricopa, and Pinal Counties	Polly Getzwiller*	Democrat	
7 - Gila, and Pinal Counties	Edward G. Guerrero	Democrat	
7 - Gila, and Pinal Counties	E. C. "Polly" Rosenbaum*	Democrat	
8 - Cochise, Graham, and Pinal Counties	Hank Fenn	Democrat	
8 - Cochise, Graham, and Pinal Counties	Ed C. Sawyer*	Democrat	
9 - Cochise, Pima, and Santa Cruz Counties	Richard Pacheco	Democrat	
9 - Cochise, Pima, and Santa Cruz Counties	William R. Ryan	Democrat	
10 - Pima, and Yuma Counties	Bernardo M. Cajero	Democrat	
10 - Pima, and Yuma Counties	E. S. "Bud" Walker	Democrat	
11 - Pima County	Etta Mae Hutcheson*	Democrat	
11 - Pima County	Ethel Maynard*	Democrat	
12 - Pima County	R. P. "Bob" Fricks*	Democrat	
12 - Pima County	J. H. (Jim) Dewberry Jr.*	Democrat	
13 - Pima County	Thomas N. Goodwin*	Republican	
13 - Pima County	H. Thomas Kincaid	Republican	
14 - Pima County	Helen Grace Carlson	Democrat	
14 - Pima County	David B. Stone*	Republican	
15 - Pima County	W. A. "Tony" Buehl*	Republican	
15 - Pima County	Charles W. King	Republican	
16 - Maricopa County	C. W. "Bill" Lewis*	Republican	
16 - Maricopa County	Hal Runyan	Republican	
17 - Maricopa County	James B. Ratliff	Republican	
17 - Maricopa County	W. Vincent Thelander	Republican	
18 - Maricopa County	Don Stewart*	Republican	
18 - Maricopa County	Bob Strother	Republican	
19 - Maricopa County	Stan Akers*	Republican	
19 - Maricopa County	Timothy A. Barrow*	Republican	
20 - Maricopa County	Ruth Adams*	Republican	
20 - Maricopa County	Richard Burgess	Republican	
21 - Maricopa County	Sam Flake*	Republican	
21 - Maricopa County	Peter Kay*	Republican	
22 - Maricopa County	Howard Adams	Republican	
22 - Maricopa County	Bill McCune	Republican	
23 - Maricopa County	Burton S. Barr*	Republican	
23 - Maricopa County	Ruth Peck*	Republican	
24 - Maricopa County	Elizabeth Adams Rockwell*	Republican	
24 - Maricopa County	Jay Stuckey*	Republican	
25 - Maricopa County	D. Lee Jones*	Republican	
25 - Maricopa County	Jim Skelly*	Republican	
26 - Maricopa County	Frank Kelley*	Republican	
26 - Maricopa County	Bob Hungerford	Republican	
27 - Maricopa County	Art Coppinger*	Democrat	
27 - Maricopa County	Manuel "Lito" Pena*	Democrat	
28 - Maricopa County	Leon Thompson*	Democrat	
28 - Maricopa County	Horace E. Owens	Democrat	
29 - Maricopa County	James J. Sossaman*	Republican	
29 - Maricopa County	Michael Goodwin	Republican	
30 - Maricopa County	Stan Turley*	Republican	
30 - Maricopa County	Jim L. Cooper*	Republican	
