= 1958 Arizona House of Representatives election =

1958 Arizona House of Representatives elections
- November 4, 1958

All 80 seats in the Arizona House 41 seats needed for a majority
	Majority party	Minority party
Party	Democratic	Republican
Last election	57	23
Seats before	58 (Note: During the 23rd Arizona State Legislature, Representative Hathcock changed party from Republican to Democrat.)	22
Seats after	55	25
Seat change	▼3	▲3
Speaker before election
W. L. "Tay" Cook
Democrat
Elected Speaker
W. L. "Tay" Cook
Democrat

The 1958 Arizona House of Representatives elections were held on November 4, 1958. Voters elected members of the Arizona House of Representatives in all 80 of the state's House districts to serve a two-year term. The elections coincided with the elections for other offices, including Governor, U.S. Senate, U.S. House, and State Senate. Primary elections were held on September 9, 1958.

Prior to the elections, the Democrats held a majority of 58 seats over the Republicans' 22 seats. Democrats gained a seat mid-session when Representative Hathcock changed party from Republican to Democrat.

Following the election, Democrats maintained control of the chamber with 55 Democrats to 25 Republicans, a net gain of three seats for Republicans.

The newly elected members served in the 24th Arizona State Legislature, during which Democrat W. L. "Tay" Cook was chosen as Speaker of the Arizona House. (Note: Cook was elected as Speaker for the 24th legislature, defeating Representative Klauer, who was also nominated for Speaker. The vote tally for Speaker was: Cook-64 votes; Klauer-15 votes; and one vote "present" (Jennings).)

== Summary of Results ==
County	Subdistrict	Incumbent	Party	Elected Representative	Outcome
Apache	Apache-1	James S. Shreeve	Dem	James S. Shreeve	Dem Hold
Cochise	Cochise-1	Clyde M. Dalton	Dem	Clyde M. Dalton	Dem Hold
Cochise	Cochise-2	H. J. (Duffy) Lewis	Dem	Andrew J. (Jack) Gilbert	Dem Hold
Cochise	Cochise-3	Charles O. Bloomquist	Dem	Charles O. Bloomquist	Dem Hold
Cochise	Cochise-4	W. L. "Tay" Cook	Dem	W. L. "Tay" Cook	Dem Hold
Coconino	Coconino-1	Thomas M. (Tommy) Knoles Jr.	Dem	Thomas M. (Tommy) Knoles Jr.	Dem Hold
Coconino	Coconino-2	Harold J. Scudder	Dem	Harold J. Scudder	Dem Hold
Gila	Gila-1	Louis B. Ellsworth Jr.	Dem	R. E. "Arky" Burnham	Dem Hold
Gila	Gila-2	Nelson D. Brayton	Dem	Nelson D. Brayton	Dem Hold
Gila	Gila-3	Edwynne C. "Polly" Rosenbaum	Dem	Edwynne C. "Polly" Rosenbaum	Dem Hold
Graham	Graham-1	E. L. Tidwell	Dem	E. L. Tidwell	Dem Hold
Graham	Graham-2	Milton Lines	Dem	Milton Lines	Dem Hold
Greenlee	Greenlee-1	Tom W. Berry	Dem	Tom W. Berry	Dem Hold
Greenlee	Greenlee-2	G. O. (Sonny) Biles	Dem	G. O. (Sonny) Biles	Dem Hold
Maricopa	Maricopa-1	Ed Ellsworth	Dem	Marshall Humphrey	Rep Gain
Maricopa	Maricopa-2	Vernon Hathcock	Dem	William S. Porter	Rep Gain
Maricopa	Maricopa-3	Laron Waldo DeWitt	Rep	Laron Waldo DeWitt	Rep Hold
Maricopa	Maricopa-4	J. O. Grimes	Dem	J. O. Grimes	Dem Hold
Maricopa	Maricopa-5	W. W. Mitchell, Sr.	Dem	Elmer G. King	Dem Hold
Maricopa	Maricopa-6	Carl Austin	Dem	Carl Austin	Dem Hold
Maricopa	Maricopa-7	J. R. (Dick) Johnson	Dem	Bob Stump	Dem Hold
Maricopa	Maricopa-8	Carl Sims Sr.	Dem	Carl Sims Sr.	Dem Hold
Maricopa	Maricopa-9	Arlo O. Gooch	Dem	Sidney Kartus	Dem Hold
Maricopa	Maricopa-10	Sherman R. Dent	Dem	Martin P. Toscano	Dem Hold
Maricopa	Maricopa-11	Bob E. Wilson	Dem	Frank Bowman	Dem Hold
Maricopa	Maricopa-12	Marie S. Earl	Dem	Sherman R. Dent	Dem Hold
Maricopa	Maricopa-13	Conrad James Carreon	Dem	Conrad James Carreon	Dem Hold
Maricopa	Maricopa-14	William J. Harkness	Dem	Marie S. Earl	Dem Hold
Maricopa	Maricopa-15	L. S. (Dick) Adams	Dem	Geraldine F. (Gerry) Eliot	Rep Gain
Maricopa	Maricopa-16	Geraldine F. (Gerry) Eliot	Rep	Jack E. Gardner	Dem Gain
Maricopa	Maricopa-17	Jack E. Gardner	Dem	S. Earl Pugh	Dem Hold
Maricopa	Maricopa-18	Robert (Bob) Brewer	Rep	Robert L. Myers	Rep Hold
Maricopa	Maricopa-19	Carl C. Andersen	Rep	Emogene Jennings	Rep Hold
Maricopa	Maricopa-20	Malcolm L. Lentz	Rep	William F. Vipperman Jr.	Dem Gain
Maricopa	Maricopa-21	Emogene M. Jennings	Rep	Don Reese	Rep Hold
Maricopa	Maricopa-22	W. I. (Ike) Lowry	Rep	Elmer T. Burson	Rep Hold
Maricopa	Maricopa-23	Lillian Retzloff	Dem	W. I. (Ike) Lowry	Rep Gain
Maricopa	Maricopa-24	Ruth Adams White	Rep	Ruth Peck	Rep Hold
Maricopa	Maricopa-25	Isabel Burgess	Rep	Chet Goldberg Jr.	Rep Hold
Maricopa	Maricopa-26	David H. Campbell	Rep	Robert Brewer	Rep Hold
Maricopa	Maricopa-27	Del Rogers	Dem	Charles H. Oatman	Dem Hold
Maricopa	Maricopa-28	Robert C. Forquer	Rep	Bill Stephens	Dem Gain
Maricopa	Maricopa-29	John C. Hughes	Dem	Priscilla H. Hays	Rep Gain
Maricopa	Maricopa-30	R. H. (Bob) Wallace	Rep	F. A. Higgins	Rep Hold
Maricopa	Maricopa-31	Arthur B. Schellenberg	Rep	David H. Campbell	Rep Hold
Maricopa	Maricopa-32	William J. Kamp	Dem	Arthur B. Schellenberg	Rep Gain
Maricopa	Maricopa-33	Bill Stephens	Dem	Merle E. Hays	Dem Hold
Maricopa	Maricopa-34	W. B. Barkley	Dem	Gene B. McClellan	Rep Gain
Maricopa	Maricopa-35	Lewis B. Bramkamp	Dem	W. B. Barkley	Dem Hold
Maricopa	Maricopa-36	S. Earl Pugh	Dem	Lewis B. Bramkamp	Dem Hold
Maricopa	Maricopa-37	T. C. (Doc) Rhodes	Dem	T. C. (Doc) Rhodes	Dem Hold
Mohave	Mohave-1	J. J. Glancy	Dem	J. J. Glancy	Dem Hold
Navajo	Navajo-1	Augusta T. Larson	Rep	Augusta T. Larson	Rep Hold
Navajo	Navajo-2	Lee F. Dover	Dem	Lee F. Dover	Dem Hold
Pima	Pima-1	Eaner T. Seaberg	Dem	Emmett S. (Bud) Walker	Dem Hold
Pima	Pima-2	James N. Corbett Jr.	Dem	Arnold Elias	Dem Hold
Pima	Pima-3	Etta Mae Hutcheson	Dem	Etta Mae Hutcheson	Dem Hold
Pima	Pima-4	William M. Carson	Dem	James L. Kennedy	Dem Hold
Pima	Pima-5	Dr. Thomas D. Fridena	Dem	Dr. Thomas D. Fridena	Dem Hold
Pima	Pima-6	Douglas S. Holsclaw	Rep	Douglas S. Holsclaw	Rep Hold
Pima	Pima-7	Julliette C. Willis	Rep	David G. Hawkins	Rep Hold
Pima	Pima-8	V. S. "John" Hostetter	Rep	V. S. "John" Hostetter	Rep Hold
Pima	Pima-9	Marvin L. Burton	Dem	William Minor	Dem Hold
Pima	Pima-10	Alvin H. Wessler	Rep	Alvin H. Wessler	Rep Hold
Pima	Pima-11	James W. Carroll	Dem	Ray Martin	Dem Hold
Pima	Pima-12	John H. Haugh	Rep	John H. Haugh	Rep Hold
Pima	Pima-13	Keith S. Brown	Rep	Thomas C. Webster	Rep Hold
Pima	Pima-14	Frank G. Robles	Dem	Emilio Carrillo	Dem Hold
Pima	Pima-15	W. G. "Bill" Bodell	Rep	W. G. "Bill" Bodell	Rep Hold
Pima	Pima-16	Harold L. Cook	Dem	Harold L. Cook	Dem Hold
Pinal	Pinal-1	Harry Bagnall	Dem	Charles Moody	Dem Hold
Pinal	Pinal-2	Frederick S. Smith	Dem	Frederick S. Smith	Dem Hold
Pinal	Pinal-3	E. B. Thode	Dem	E. B. Thode	Dem Hold
Santa Cruz	Santa Cruz-1	Robert R. (Bob) Hathaway	Dem	Robert R. (Bob) Hathaway	Dem Hold
Yavapai	Yavapai-1	Mabel S. Ellis	Dem	Mabel S. Ellis	Dem Hold
Yavapai	Yavapai-2	Dick W. Martin	Rep	Joseph L. (Joe) Allen	Dem Gain
Yavapai	Yavapai-3	Milton O. "Mo" Lindner, Sr.	Dem	Milton O. "Mo" Lindner, Sr.	Dem Hold
Yuma	Yuma-1	Robert L. "Bob" Klauer	Dem	C. D. Miller	Dem Hold
Yuma	Yuma-2	John C. Smith Jr.	Dem	Robert (Bob) Klauer	Dem Hold
Yuma	Yuma-3	Al Lindsey	Dem	Clara Osborne Botzum	Dem Hold

== Detailed Results ==
=== Apache-1 ===
General election results
Party	Candidate	Votes	%
Democratic	James S. Shreeve (incumbent)	1,570	64.24%
Republican	Sam Day III	874	35.76%
Total votes		2,444	100.00%
Democratic hold			

=== Cochise-1 ===
General election results
Party	Candidate	Votes	%
Democratic	Clyde M. Dalton (incumbent)	2,661	100.00%
Total votes		2,661	100.00%
Democratic hold			

=== Cochise-2 ===
General election results
Party	Candidate	Votes	%
Democratic	Andrew J. (Jack) Gilbert	2,898	100.00%
Total votes		2,898	100.00%
Democratic hold			

=== Cochise-3 ===
General election results
Party	Candidate	Votes	%
Democratic	Charles O. Bloomquist (incumbent)	1,808	100.00%
Total votes		1,808	100.00%
Democratic hold			

=== Cochise-4 ===
General election results
Party	Candidate	Votes	%
Democratic	W. L. (Tay) Cook (incumbent)	2,082	100.00%
Total votes		2,082	100.00%
Democratic hold			

=== Coconino-1 ===
General election results
Party	Candidate	Votes	%
Democratic	Thomas M. (Tommy) Knoles Jr. (incumbent)	2,754	100.00%
Total votes		2,754	100.00%
Democratic hold			

=== Coconino-2 ===
General election results
Party	Candidate	Votes	%
Democratic	Harold J. Scudder (incumbent)	2,028	100.00%
Total votes		2,028	100.00%
Democratic hold			

=== Gila-1 ===
General election results
Party	Candidate	Votes	%
Democratic	R. E. "Arky" Burnham	1,993	100.00%
Total votes		1,993	100.00%
Democratic hold			

=== Gila-2 ===
General election results
Party	Candidate	Votes	%
Democratic	Nelson D. Brayton (incumbent)	1,695	100.00%
Total votes		1,695	100.00%
Democratic hold			

=== Gila-3 ===
General election results
Party	Candidate	Votes	%
Democratic	Edwynne C. "Polly" Rosenbaum (incumbent)	3,043	100.00%
Total votes		3,043	100.00%
Democratic hold			

=== Graham-1 ===
General election results
Party	Candidate	Votes	%
Democratic	E. L. Tidwell (incumbent)	2,058	100.00%
Total votes		2,058	100.00%
Democratic hold			

=== Graham-2 ===
General election results
Party	Candidate	Votes	%
Democratic	Milton Lines (incumbent)	797	100.00%
Total votes		797	100.00%
Democratic hold			

=== Greenlee-1 ===
General election results
Party	Candidate	Votes	%
Democratic	Tom W. Berry (incumbent)	1,645	100.00%
Total votes		1,645	100.00%
Democratic hold			

=== Greenlee-2 ===
General election results
Party	Candidate	Votes	%
Democratic	G. O. (Sonny) Biles (incumbent)	2,010	100.00%
Total votes		2,010	100.00%
Democratic hold			

=== Maricopa-1 ===
General election results
Party	Candidate	Votes	%
Republican	Marshall Humphrey	2,304	58.60%
Democratic	Jack Adam	1,628	41.40%
Total votes		3,932	100.00%
Republican gain from Democratic			

=== Maricopa-2 ===
General election results
Party	Candidate	Votes	%
Republican	William S. Porter	2,613	64.06%
Democratic	Orin C. Fuller	1,466	35.94%
Total votes		4,079	100.00%
Republican gain from Democratic			

=== Maricopa-3 ===
General election results
Party	Candidate	Votes	%
Republican	Laron Waldo DeWitt (incumbent)	2,066	50.58%
Democratic	Wayne C. Pomeroy	2,019	49.42%
Total votes		4,085	100.00%
Republican hold			

=== Maricopa-4 ===
General election results
Party	Candidate	Votes	%
Democratic	J. O. Grimes (incumbent)	2,458	62.20%
Republican	John E. Wiley	1,494	37.80%
Total votes		3,952	100.00%
Democratic hold			

=== Maricopa-5 ===
General election results
Party	Candidate	Votes	%
Democratic	Elmer G. King	2,630	66.80%
Republican	Sarah E. Crowder	1,307	33.20%
Total votes		3,937	100.00%
Democratic hold			

=== Maricopa-6 ===
General election results
Party	Candidate	Votes	%
Democratic	Carl Austin (incumbent)	2,501	70.11%
Republican	Mabel E. Pinyan	1,066	29.89%
Total votes		3,567	100.00%
Democratic hold			

=== Maricopa-7 ===
General election results
Party	Candidate	Votes	%
Democratic	Bob Stump	2,566	74.51%
Republican	Mort Brayer	878	25.49%
Total votes		3,444	100.00%
Democratic hold			

=== Maricopa-8 ===
General election results
Party	Candidate	Votes	%
Democratic	Carl Sims, Sr. (incumbent)	2,491	100.00%
Total votes		2,491	100.00%
Democratic hold			

=== Maricopa-9 ===
General election results
Party	Candidate	Votes	%
Democratic	Sidney Kartus	2,354	100.00%
Total votes		2,354	100.00%
Democratic hold			

=== Maricopa-10 ===
General election results
Party	Candidate	Votes	%
Democratic	Martin P. Toscano	2,550	100.00%
Total votes		2,550	100.00%
Democratic hold			

=== Maricopa-11 ===
General election results
Party	Candidate	Votes	%
Democratic	Frank Bowman	2,561	50.74%
Republican	C. W. Myers	2,486	49.26%
Total votes		5,047	100.00%
Democratic hold			

=== Maricopa-12 ===
General election results
Party	Candidate	Votes	%
Democratic	Sherman R. Dent (incumbent) (Note: Redistricted from Maricopa-10 to Maricopa-12.)	2,007	54.39%
Republican	Theodore Cogswell	1,683	45.61%
Total votes		3,690	100.00%
Democratic hold			

=== Maricopa-13 ===
General election results
Party	Candidate	Votes	%
Democratic	Conrad James Carreon (incumbent)	1,740	100.00%
Total votes		1,740	100.00%
Democratic hold			

=== Maricopa-14 ===
General election results
Party	Candidate	Votes	%
Democratic	Marie S. Earl (incumbent) (Note: Redistricted from Maricopa-12 to Maricopa-14.)	2,001	100.00%
Total votes		2,001	100.00%
Democratic hold			

=== Maricopa-15 ===
General election results
Party	Candidate	Votes	%
Republican	Geraldine F. (Gerry) Eliot (incumbent) (Note: Redistricted from Maricopa-16 to Maricopa-15.)	2,036	55.46%
Democratic	Harry S. Ruppelius	1,635	44.54%
Total votes		3,671	100.00%
Republican gain from Democratic			

=== Maricopa-16 ===
General election results
Party	Candidate	Votes	%
Democratic	Jack E. Gardner (incumbent) (Note: Redistricted from Maricopa-17 to Maricopa-16.)	2,274	100.00%
Total votes		2,274	100.00%
Democratic gain from Republican			

=== Maricopa-17 ===
General election results
Party	Candidate	Votes	%
Democratic	S. Earl Pugh (incumbent) (Note: Redistricted from Maricopa-36 to Maricopa-17.)	4,376	100.00%
Total votes		4,376	100.00%
Democratic hold			

=== Maricopa-18 ===
General election results
Party	Candidate	Votes	%
Republican	Robert L. Myers	2,059	57.37%
Democratic	Willis D. Oldham	1,530	42.63%
Total votes		3,589	100.00%
Republican hold			

=== Maricopa-19 ===
General election results
Party	Candidate	Votes	%
Republican	Emogene Jennings (incumbent) (Note: Redistricted from Maricopa-21 to Maricopa-19.)	1,913	52.86%
Democratic	Del J. Rogers	1,706	47.14%
Total votes		3,619	100.00%
Republican hold			

=== Maricopa-20 ===
General election results
Party	Candidate	Votes	%
Democratic	William F. Vipperman Jr.	1,964	100.00%
Total votes		1,964	100.00%
Democratic gain from Republican			

=== Maricopa-21 ===
General election results
Party	Candidate	Votes	%
Republican	Don Reese	4,214	71.86%
Democratic	Henry A. Church III	1,650	28.14%
Total votes		5,864	100.00%
Republican hold			

=== Maricopa-22 ===
General election results
Party	Candidate	Votes	%
Republican	Elmer T. Burson	2,507	62.27%
Democratic	Charles L. Scott	1,519	37.73%
Total votes		4,026	100.00%
Republican hold			

=== Maricopa-23 ===
General election results
Party	Candidate	Votes	%
Republican	W. I. (Ike) Lowry (incumbent) (Note: Redistricted from Maricopa-22 to Maricopa-23.)	1,774	50.33%
Democratic	J. C. Bennett	1,751	49.67%
Total votes		3,525	100.00%
Republican gain from Democratic			

=== Maricopa-24 ===
General election results
Party	Candidate	Votes	%
Republican	Ruth Peck	2,095	57.92%
Democratic	Ted Mote	1,522	42.08%
Total votes		3,617	100.00%
Republican hold			

=== Maricopa-25 ===
General election results
Party	Candidate	Votes	%
Republican	Chet Goldberg Jr.	2,189	59.86%
Democratic	George S. Sebestyen	1,468	40.14%
Total votes		3,657	100.00%
Republican hold			

=== Maricopa-26 ===
General election results
Party	Candidate	Votes	%
Republican	Robert Brewer (incumbent) (Note: Redistricted from Maricopa-18 to Maricopa-26.)	1,982	55.55%
Democratic	Don L. Riggs	1,586	44.45%
Total votes		3,568	100.00%
Republican hold			

=== Maricopa-27 ===
General election results
Party	Candidate	Votes	%
Democratic	Charles H. Oatman	2,021	55.10%
Republican	Ruth C. Kuntz	1,647	44.90%
Total votes		3,668	100.00%
Democratic hold			

=== Maricopa-28 ===
General election results
Party	Candidate	Votes	%
Democratic	Bill Stephens (incumbent) (Note: Redistricted from Maricopa-33 to Maricopa-28.)	3,181	100.00%
Total votes		3,181	100.00%
Democratic gain from Republican			

=== Maricopa-29 ===
General election results
Party	Candidate	Votes	%
Republican	Priscilla H. Hays	1,725	51.86%
Democratic	John C. Hughes (incumbent)	1,601	48.14%
Total votes		3,326	100.00%
Republican gain from Democratic			

=== Maricopa-30 ===
General election results
Party	Candidate	Votes	%
Republican	F. A. Higgins	2,087	57.16%
Democratic	Barney Blaine	1,564	42.84%
Total votes		3,651	100.00%
Republican hold			

=== Maricopa-31 ===
General election results
Party	Candidate	Votes	%
Republican	David H. Campbell (incumbent) (Note: Redistricted from Maricopa-26 to Maricopa-31.)	2,596	54.64%
Democratic	Wing F. Ong	2,155	45.36%
Total votes		4,751	100.00%
Republican hold			

=== Maricopa-32 ===
General election results
Party	Candidate	Votes	%
Republican	Arthur B. Schellenberg (incumbent) (Note: Redistricted from Maricopa-31 to Maricopa-32.)	2,575	72.33%
Democratic	Richard E. Brand	985	27.67%
Total votes		3,560	100.00%
Republican gain from Democratic			

=== Maricopa-33 ===
General election results
Party	Candidate	Votes	%
Democratic	Merle E. Hays	2,192	53.14%
Republican	L. W. Hacker	1,933	46.86%
Total votes		4,125	100.00%
Democratic hold			

=== Maricopa-34 ===
General election results
Party	Candidate	Votes	%
Republican	Gene B. McClellan	2,584	55.71%
Democratic	David L. Jones	2,054	44.29%
Total votes		4,638	100.00%
Republican gain from Democratic			

=== Maricopa-35 ===
General election results
Party	Candidate	Votes	%
Democratic	W. B. Barkley (incumbent) (Note: Redistricted from Maricopa-34 to Maricopa-35.)	2,374	66.65%
Republican	Edna M. Meyers	1,188	33.35%
Total votes		3,562	100.00%
Democratic hold			

=== Maricopa-36 ===
General election results
Party	Candidate	Votes	%
Democratic	Lewis B. Bramkamp (incumbent) (Note: Redistricted from Maricopa-35 to Maricopa-36.)	1,789	53.51%
Republican	W. K. McElhaney	1,554	46.49%
Total votes		3,343	100.00%
Democratic hold			

=== Maricopa-37 ===
General election results
Party	Candidate	Votes	%
Democratic	T. C. (Doc) Rhodes (incumbent)	2,797	100.00%
Total votes		2,797	100.00%
Democratic hold			

=== Mohave-1 ===
General election results
Party	Candidate	Votes	%
Democratic	J. J. Glancy (incumbent)	2,030	100.00%
Total votes		2,030	100.00%
Democratic hold			

=== Navajo-1 ===
General election results
Party	Candidate	Votes	%
Republican	Augusta T. Larson (incumbent)	1,935	57.61%
Democratic	A. Belton Palmer	1,424	42.39%
Total votes		3,359	100.00%
Republican hold			

=== Navajo-2 ===
General election results
Party	Candidate	Votes	%
Democratic	Lee F. Dover (incumbent)	2,064	100.00%
Total votes		2,064	100.00%
Democratic hold			

=== Pima-1 ===
General election results
Party	Candidate	Votes	%
Democratic	Emmett S. (Bud) Walker	1,870	100.00%
Total votes		1,870	100.00%
Democratic hold			

=== Pima-2 ===
General election results
Party	Candidate	Votes	%
Democratic	Arnold Elias	3,133	62.44%
Republican	Harry Badet	1,885	37.56%
Total votes		5,018	100.00%
Democratic hold			

=== Pima-3 ===
General election results
Party	Candidate	Votes	%
Democratic	Etta Mae Hutcheson (incumbent)	1,093	100.00%
Total votes		1,093	100.00%
Democratic hold			

=== Pima-4 ===
General election results
Party	Candidate	Votes	%
Democratic	James L. Kennedy	3,335	100.00%
Total votes		3,335	100.00%
Democratic hold			

=== Pima-5 ===
General election results
Party	Candidate	Votes	%
Democratic	Dr. Thomas D. Fridena (incumbent)	1,160	100.00%
Total votes		1,160	100.00%
Democratic hold			

=== Pima-6 ===
General election results
Party	Candidate	Votes	%
Republican	Douglas S. Holsclaw (incumbent)	1,416	64.45%
Democratic	Claire Cammisa	781	35.55%
Total votes		2,197	100.00%
Republican hold			

=== Pima-7 ===
General election results
Party	Candidate	Votes	%
Republican	David G. Hawkins	1,930	52.55%
Democratic	Kathryn L. Woodward	1,743	47.45%
Total votes		3,673	100.00%
Republican hold			

=== Pima-8 ===
General election results
Party	Candidate	Votes	%
Republican	V. S. "John" Hostetter (incumbent)	1,988	64.67%
Democratic	Maurice Krotenberg	1,086	35.33%
Total votes		3,074	100.00%
Republican hold			

=== Pima-9 ===
General election results
Party	Candidate	Votes	%
Democratic	William I. Minor	1,961	52.41%
Republican	Earl J. Ballinger	1,434	38.32%
Clean Government	Richard J. Dowdall	347	9.27%
Total votes		3,742	100.00%
Democratic hold			

=== Pima-10 ===
General election results
Party	Candidate	Votes	%
Republican	Alvin Wessler (incumbent)	3,329	54.99%
Democratic	Albert N. Hopper	2,725	45.01%
Total votes		6,054	100.00%
Republican hold			

=== Pima-11 ===
General election results
Party	Candidate	Votes	%
Democratic	Ray Martin	2,863	52.91%
Republican	Bill Gruber	2,548	47.09%
Total votes		5,411	100.00%
Democratic hold			

=== Pima-12 ===
General election results
Party	Candidate	Votes	%
Republican	John H. Haugh (incumbent)	2,556	61.13%
Democratic	William (Bill) Ramsay	1,625	38.87%
Total votes		4,181	100.00%
Republican hold			

=== Pima-13 ===
General election results
Party	Candidate	Votes	%
Republican	Thomas C. Webster	2,260	50.04%
Democratic	Cliff Kramer	2,256	49.96%
Total votes		4,516	100.00%
Republican hold			

=== Pima-14 ===
General election results
Party	Candidate	Votes	%
Democratic	Emilio Carrillo	1,745	77.62%
Republican	Evelyn F. Mann	503	22.38%
Total votes		2,248	100.00%
Democratic hold			

=== Pima-15 ===
General election results
Party	Candidate	Votes	%
Republican	W. G. "Bill" Bodell (incumbent)	1,484	51.07%
Democratic	Darlene C. (Mrs. William J.) Bray	1,422	48.93%
Total votes		2,906	100.00%
Republican hold			

=== Pima-16 ===
General election results
Party	Candidate	Votes	%
Democratic	Harold L. Cook (incumbent)	3,263	100.00%
Total votes		3,263	100.00%
Democratic hold			

=== Pinal-1 ===
General election results
Party	Candidate	Votes	%
Democratic	Charles Moody	2,448	100.00%
Total votes		2,448	100.00%
Democratic hold			

=== Pinal-2 ===
General election results
Party	Candidate	Votes	%
Democratic	Frederick S. Smith (incumbent)	3,315	100.00%
Total votes		3,315	100.00%
Democratic hold			

=== Pinal-3 ===
General election results
Party	Candidate	Votes	%
Democratic	E. B. Thode (incumbent)	3,031	100.00%
Total votes		3,031	100.00%
Democratic hold			

=== Santa Cruz-1 ===
General election results
Party	Candidate	Votes	%
Democratic	Robert R. (Bob) Hathaway (incumbent)	2,275	100.00%
Total votes		2,275	100.00%
Democratic hold			

=== Yavapai-1 ===
General election results
Party	Candidate	Votes	%
Democratic	Mabel S. Ellis (incumbent)	2,218	100.00%
Total votes		2,218	100.00%
Democratic hold			

=== Yavapai-2 ===
General election results
Party	Candidate	Votes	%
Democratic	Joseph L. (Joe) Allen	1,608	51.72%
Republican	Dick W. Martin (incumbent)	1,501	48.28%
Total votes		3,109	100.00%
Democratic gain from Republican			

=== Yavapai-3 ===
General election results
Party	Candidate	Votes	%
Democratic	Milton O. (Mo) Lindner (incumbent)	1,785	61.17%
Republican	Robert N. Warner	1,133	38.83%
Total votes		2,918	100.00%
Democratic hold			

=== Yuma-1 ===
General election results
Party	Candidate	Votes	%
Democratic	C. D. Miller	2,196	100.00%
Total votes		2,196	100.00%
Democratic hold			

=== Yuma-2 ===
General election results
Party	Candidate	Votes	%
Democratic	Robert (Bob) Klauer (incumbent) (Note: Redistricted from Yuma-1 to Yuma-2.)	3,061	100.00%
Total votes		3,061	100.00%
Democratic hold			

=== Yuma-3 ===
General election results
Party	Candidate	Votes	%
Democratic	Clara Osborne Botzum	1,980	67.62%
Republican	Mary A. Burns	948	32.38%
Total votes		2,928	100.00%
Democratic hold			
