= 27th Arizona State Legislature =

Session of the Arizona Legislature

←	26th	28th	→
- Arizona State Capitol (2014)

Overview
- Legislative body: Arizona State Legislature
- Jurisdiction: Arizona, United States
- Term: January 1, 1965 – December 31, 1966

Senate
- Members: 28
- Party control: Democratic (26–2)

House of Representatives
- Members: 80
- Party control: Democratic (45–35)

Sessions
- 1st: January 11 – April 20, 1965
- 2nd: January 10 – April 23, 1966

Special sessions
- 1st: April 21 – May 10, 1965
- 2nd: May 11 – June 15, 1965
- 3rd: June 16 – July 1, 1965
- 4th: September 13 – October 9, 1965

The 27th Arizona State Legislature, consisting of the Arizona State Senate and the Arizona House of Representatives, was constituted in Phoenix from January 1, 1965, to December 31, 1966, during Samuel Pearson Goddard Jr.'s only term as Governor of Arizona. The number of senators remained constant at two per county, totaling 28, and the members of the house of representatives also held steady at 80. The Democrats picked up two seats in the Senate, giving them a 26–2 edge in the upper house, while the Republicans gained three seats in the House, trimming the Democrats majority to 45–35.

== Sessions ==
The Legislature met for two regular sessions at the State Capitol in Phoenix. The first opened on January 11, 1965, and adjourned on April 20; while the second convened on January 10, 1966, and adjourned on April 23. There were four Special Sessions, all in 1965. The first Special Session convened April 21, 1965, and adjourned sine die on May 10; the second convened on May 11, 1965, and adjourned sine die on June 15; the Third Special session convened on June 16, 1965, and adjourned sine die on July 1; with the final Special Session, the fourth, convened September 13, 1965 and adjourned sine die on October 9.

== State Senate ==
=== Members ===
The asterisk (*) denotes members of the previous Legislature who continued in office as members of this Legislature.

County	Senator	Party	Notes
Apache	Milford Hall	Democrat	
Apache	Walter Pulispher	Democrat	
Cochise	Dan S. Kitchel*	Democrat	
Cochise	A. R. Spikes*	Democrat	
Coconino	Thomas N. Knoles Jr.*	Democrat	
Coconino	Fred F. Udine*	Democrat	
Gila	Clarence L. Carpenter*	Democrat	Senate President
Gila	William A. Sullivan*	Democrat	
Graham	Darvil B. McBride*	Democrat	
Graham	John Mickelson*	Democrat	
Greenlee	M. L. Sims*	Democrat	
Greenlee	John McLaughlin	Democrat	
Maricopa	George Peck	Democrat	
Maricopa	John Conlan	Republican	
Mohave	Earle W. Cook*	Democrat	
Mohave	Robert Morrow*	Democrat	
Navajo	William Huso*	Democrat	
Navajo	Glenn Blansett*	Democrat	
Pima	Sol Ahee*	Democrat	
Pima	Edward I. Kennedy	Democrat	
Pinal	E. B. Thode	Democrat	
Pinal	Ben Arnold*	Democrat	
Santa Cruz	C. B. (Bert) Smith	Democrat	
Santa Cruz	Robert Hathaway	Democrat	
Yavapai	David H. Palmer*	Democrat	
Yavapai	Boyd Tenney	Republican	
Yuma	Harold C. Giss*	Democrat	
Yuma	Ray H. Thompson*	Democrat	

== House of Representatives ==
=== Members ===
The asterisk (*) denotes members of the previous Legislature who continued in office as members of this Legislature.

County	Representative	Party	Notes
Apache	Jack A. Brown*	Democrat	
Cochise	W. L. (Tay) Cook	Democrat	
Cochise	James A. Elliott*	Democrat	
Cochise	Andrew J. Gilbert*	Democrat	
Coconino	Charles W. Sechrist*	Democrat	
Coconino	Harold J. Scudder*	Democrat	
Gila	Charles R "Bert" Horne	Democrat	
Gila	Edwynne C. (Polly) Rosenbaum*	Democrat	
Graham	Gordon L. Hoopes*	Democrat	
Greenlee	G. O. (Sonny) Biles*	Democrat	
Maricopa	Ruth Adams	Republican	
Maricopa	Harry Bandouveris	Republican	
Maricopa	Burton S. Barr	Republican	
Maricopa	Robert Brewer*	Republican	
Maricopa	M. J. (Buck) Brown *	Democrat	
Maricopa	Isabel Burgess*	Republican	
Maricopa	Leonard M. Calderon Jr.	Democrat	
Maricopa	Cloves C. Campbell*	Democrat	
Maricopa	D. Delos Ellsworth	Republican	
Maricopa	Sam Flake	Republican	
Maricopa	Al Franz*	Democrat	
Maricopa	Ray A. Goetze*	Republican	
Maricopa	Chet Goldberg Jr.	Republican	
Maricopa	Priscilla H. Hays*	Republican	
Maricopa	Jim Holley*	Republican	
Maricopa	Robert H. Hutto*	Democrat	
Maricopa	Davidson Jenks*	Republican	
Maricopa	Chris T. Johnson	Republican	
Maricopa	Frank J. Kelley	Republican	
Maricopa	A. E. Kluender	Republican	
Maricopa	David B. Kret*	Republican	
Maricopa	R. Larry Oldham*	Republican	
Maricopa	Ruth Peck*	Republican	
Maricopa	M. C. Plummer	Democrat	
Maricopa	William S. Porter*	Republican	
Maricopa	John C. Pritzlaff*	Republican	
Maricopa	T. C. Rhodes*	Democrat	
Maricopa	Elizabeth Adams Rockwell	Republican	
Maricopa	Archie C. Ryan*	Democrat	
Maricopa	James E. Shelley*	Republican	
Maricopa	Walter P. Sherrill*	Republican	
Maricopa	Harold W. Smith	Democrat	
Maricopa	Bob Stump*	Democrat	
Maricopa	Leon Thompson*	Democrat	
Maricopa	Stan Turley	Republican	
Maricopa	David M. Valenzuela	Democrat	
Maricopa	Wm. F. (Pat) Vipperman Jr.*	Democrat	
Maricopa	La Verne Welker	Democrat	
Maricopa	Robert C. Wilcox*	Republican	
Maricopa	Jim Young	Democrat	
Mohave	Kent Smith	Democrat	
Navajo	Frank L. Crosby*	Democrat	
Navajo	Clay Simer*	Democrat	
Pima	Scott Alexander	Republican	
Pima	Thomas G. Beaham	Republican	
Pima	Sandy P. Bowling*	Democrat	
Pima	William A. Buehl	Republican	
Pima	Tony Carrillo*	Democrat	
Pima	Thomas B. Fridena	Democrat	
Pima	John H. Haugh*	Republican	
Pima	Douglas S. Holsclaw*	Republican	
Pima	Etta Mae Hutcheson*	Democrat	
Pima	William C. Jacquin	Republican	
Pima	Neal Justin	Democrat	
Pima	Sam Lena	Democrat	
Pima	Ray Martin*	Democrat	
Pima	Forrest B. Pearce*	Democrat	
Pima	Doris Varn*	Republican	
Pima	Emmett S. (Bud) Walker*	Democrat	
Pima	Joe D. Ybarra*	Democrat	
Pinal	John C. Felix	Democrat	
Pinal	Frederick S. Smith*	Democrat	
Pinal	Polly Getzwiller*	Democrat	
Santa Cruz	Jesse W. Allen	Republican	
Yavapai	Gladys Gardner	Republican	
Yavapai	William D. Lyman	Republican	
Yavapai	Leo Sullivan	Democrat	
Yuma	M. G. (Pop) Miniken*	Democrat	
Yuma	Charles A. Johnson*	Democrat	
Yuma	C. L. (Charlie) Slane*	Democrat	
