= 31st Arizona State Legislature =

Session of the Arizona Legislature

| ← | 30th | 32nd | → |
- Arizona State Capitol (2014)

Overview
- Legislative body: Arizona State Legislature
- Jurisdiction: Arizona, United States
- Term: January 1, 1973 – December 31, 1974

Senate
- Members: 30
- President: William C. Jacquin
- Party control: Republican (18–12)

House of Representatives
- Members: 60
- Speaker: Stan Akers
- Party control: Republican (38–22)

Sessions
- 1st: January 8 – May 9, 1973
- 2nd: January 14 – May 10, 1974

Special sessions
- 1st: October 22, 1973 – February 19, 1974
- 2nd: June 26 – June 26, 1974

The 31st Arizona State Legislature, consisting of the Arizona State Senate and the Arizona House of Representatives, was constituted in Phoenix from January 1, 1973, to December 31, 1974, during the last two years of Jack Williams' third term as Governor of Arizona. Both the Senate and the House membership remained constant at 30 and 60, respectively. The Republicans maintained their 18–12 edge in the upper house, while they increased their lead in the lower house to 38–22.

== Sessions ==
The Legislature met for two regular sessions at the State Capitol in Phoenix. The first opened on January 11, 1973, and adjourned on May 9; while the second convened on January 14, 1974, and adjourned on May 10. There were two Special Sessions, the first of which convened on October 22, 1973, and adjourned on February 19, 1974; the second convened on June 26, 1974, at 9:00 am and adjourned sine die at 4:09 pm on the same day.

== State Senate ==
=== Members ===
The asterisk (*) denotes members of the previous Legislature who continued in office as members of this Legislature.

| District | Senator | Party | Notes |
|---|---|---|---|
| 1 - Mohave, Yavapai, and Yuma Counties | Boyd Tenney* | Republican | |
| 2 - Gila, Maricopa, Navajo, Coconino, Mohave and Yavapai Counties | Tony Gabaldon | Democrat | |
| 3 - Apache, Navajo, and Coconino Counties | Arthur J. Hubbard Sr. | Democrat | |
| 4 - Apache, Graham, Greenlee, Pinal, Gila, and Navajo Counties | A. V. "Bill" Hardt* | Democrat | |
| 5 - Yuma County | Jones Osborn* | Democrat | |
| 6 - Maricopa, Pima, and Pinal Counties | Bob Stump* | Democrat | |
| 7 - Pima, Gila, Santa Cruz, and Pinal Counties | William L. Swink | Democrat | |
| 8 - Cochise, Graham, and Greenlee Counties | Charles Awalt* | Democrat | |
| 9 - Cochise, Pima, and Santa Cruz Counties | John Scott Ulm | Democrat | |
| 10 - Pima County | Sam Lena* | Democrat | |
| 11 - Pima County | Frank J. Felix | Democrat | |
| 12 - Pima County | Douglas S. Holsclaw* | Republican | |
| 13 - Pima County | Scott Alexander* | Republican | |
| 14 - Pima County | William C. Jacquin* | Republican | |
| 15 - Maricopa County | S. H. Runyan | Republican | |
| 16 - Maricopa County | Bob Strother | Republican | |
| 17 - Maricopa County | Fred Koory Jr.* | Republican | |
| 18 - Maricopa County | Leo Corbet* | Republican | |
| 19 - Maricopa County | Ray Rottas* | Republican | |
| 20 - Maricopa County | Bess B. Stinson* | Republican | |
| 21 - Maricopa County | Howard S. Baldwin* | Republican | |
| 22 - Maricopa County | Manuel "Lito" Pena | Democrat | |
| 23 - Maricopa County | Alfredo Gutierrez | Democrat | |
| 24 - Maricopa County | Sandra Day O'Connor* | Republican | |
| 25 - Maricopa County | Trudy Camping* | Republican | |
| 26 - Maricopa County | John Roeder | Republican | |
| 27 - Maricopa County | James A. Mack* | Republican | |
| 28 - Maricopa County | David B. Kret* | Republican | |
| 29 - Maricopa County | D. Delos Ellsworth* | Republican | |
| 30 - Maricopa County | Stan Turley | Republican | |

== House of Representatives ==
=== Members ===
The asterisk (*) denotes members of the previous Legislature who continued in office as members of this Legislature.

| District | Representative | Party | Notes |
|---|---|---|---|
| 1 - Mohave, Yavapai, and Yuma Counties | Gladys Gardner* | Republican | |
| 1 - Mohave, Yavapai, and Yuma Counties | Ray Everett* | Republican | |
| 2 - Gila, Maricopa, Navajo, Coconino, Mohave and Yavapai Counties | John Wettaw | Republican | |
| 2 - Gila, Maricopa, Navajo, Coconino, Mohave and Yavapai Counties | Sam A. McConnell Jr.* | Republican | |
| 3 - Apache, Navajo, and Coconino Counties | Jack A. Brown* | Democrat | |
| 3 - Apache, Navajo, and Coconino Counties | Benjamin Hanley | Democrat | |
| 4 - Apache, Graham, Greenlee, Pinal, Gila, and Navajo Counties | Edward G. Guerrero | Democrat | |
| 4 - Apache, Graham, Greenlee, Pinal, Gila, and Navajo Counties | E. C. "Polly" Rosenbaum* | Democrat | |
| 5 - Yuma County | Elwood W. Bradford* | Democrat | |
| 5 - Yuma County | Frank C. McElhaney | Democrat | |
| 6 - Maricopa, Pima, and Pinal Counties | G. T. Alley | Democrat | |
| 6 - Maricopa, Pima, and Pinal Counties | Polly Getzwiller* | Democrat | |
| 7 - Pima, Gila, Santa Cruz, and Pinal Counties | Craig E. Davids* | Democrat | |
| 7 - Pima, Gila, Santa Cruz, and Pinal Counties | Richard Pacheco* | Democrat | |
| 8 - Cochise, Graham, and Greenlee Counties | Hank Fenn* | Democrat | |
| 8 - Cochise, Graham, and Greenlee Counties | Ed C. Sawyer* | Democrat | |
| 9 - Cochise, Pima, and Santa Cruz Counties | J. H. (Jim) Dewberry Jr.* | Democrat | |
| 9 - Cochise, Pima, and Santa Cruz Counties | Thomas B. Richey | Republican | |
| 10 - Pima County | Larry Bahill | Democrat | |
| 10 - Pima County | Carmen Cajero | Democrat | |
| 11 - Pima County | Emilio Carrillo | Democrat | |
| 11 - Pima County | R. P. "Bob" Fricks* | Democrat | |
| 12 - Pima County | Thomas N. Goodwin* | Republican | |
| 12 - Pima County | Pete Hershberger Sr. | Republican | |
| 13 - Pima County | Helen Grace Carlson* | Democrat | |
| 13 - Pima County | H. Thomas Kincaid* | Republican | |
| 14 - Pima County | W. A. "Tony" Buehl* | Republican | |
| 14 - Pima County | Charles W. King* | Republican | |
| 15 - Maricopa County | J. Herbert Everett | Republican | |
| 15 - Maricopa County | James B. Ratliff* | Republican | |
| 16 - Maricopa County | Diane B. McCarthy | Republican | |
| 16 - Maricopa County | Don Stewart* | Republican | |
| 17 - Maricopa County | C. W. "Bill" Lewis* | Republican | |
| 17 - Maricopa County | Anne Lindeman | Republican | |
| 18 - Maricopa County | Burton S. Barr* | Republican | |
| 18 - Maricopa County | Ruth Peck* | Republican | |
| 19 - Maricopa County | Stan Akers* | Republican | |
| 19 - Maricopa County | W. A. "Tony" West Jr. | Republican | |
| 20 - Maricopa County | Howard Adams* | Republican | |
| 20 - Maricopa County | Bill McCune* | Republican | |
| 21 - Maricopa County | Elizabeth Adams Rockwell* | Republican | |
| 21 - Maricopa County | Jay Stuckey* | Republican | |
| 22 - Maricopa County | Art Hamilton | Democrat | |
| 22 - Maricopa County | R. G. "Danny" Pena | Democrat | |
| 23 - Maricopa County | Tony R. Abril | Democrat | |
| 23 - Maricopa County | Leon Thompson* | Democrat | |
| 24 - Maricopa County | Richard Burgess | Republican | |
| 24 - Maricopa County | Pete Corpstein | Republican | |
| 25 - Maricopa County | D. Lee Jones* | Republican | |
| 25 - Maricopa County | Jim Skelly* | Republican | |
| 26 - Maricopa County | Frank Kelley* | Republican | |
| 26 - Maricopa County | Peter Kay | Republican | |
| 27 - Maricopa County | Michael Goodwin | Republican | |
| 27 - Maricopa County | Juanita Harelson | Republican | |
| 28 - Maricopa County | Americo Carvalho | Republican | |
| 28 - Maricopa County | Bob Hungerford* | Republican | |
| 29 - Maricopa County | Jim L. Cooper* | Republican | |
| 29 - Maricopa County | Jack J. Taylor | Republican | |
| 30 - Maricopa County | Carl J. Kunasek | Republican | |
| 30 - Maricopa County | James J. Sossaman* | Republican | |
