= 26th Arizona State Legislature =

Session of the Arizona Legislature

←	25th	27th	→
- Arizona State Capitol (2014)

Overview
- Legislative body: Arizona State Legislature
- Jurisdiction: Arizona, United States
- Term: January 1, 1963 – December 31, 1964

Senate
- Members: 28
- Party control: Democratic (24–4)

House of Representatives
- Members: 80
- Party control: Democratic (48–32)

Sessions
- 1st: January 14 – April 2, 1963
- 2nd: January 13 – April 15, 1964

Special sessions
- 1st: April 4 – April 12, 1963
- 2nd: May 27 – June 3, 1963

The 26th Arizona State Legislature, consisting of the Arizona State Senate and the Arizona House of Representatives, was constituted in Phoenix from January 1, 1963, to December 31, 1964, during the last of three terms of Paul Fannin's time as Governor of Arizona. The number of senators remained constant at two per county, totaling 28, and the members of the house of representatives also held steady at 80. The Democrats maintained a 24–4 edge in the upper house, while the Republicans gained four seats in the House, trimming the Democrats majority to 48–32.

== Sessions ==
The Legislature met for two regular sessions at the State Capitol in Phoenix. The first opened on January 14, 1963, and adjourned on April 2; while the second convened on January 13, 1964, and adjourned on April 15. There were two Special Sessions, the first of which convened April 4, 1963, and adjourned sine die on April 4; while the second convened on May 27, 1963, and adjourned sine die on June 3.

== State Senate ==
=== Members ===
The asterisk (*) denotes members of the previous Legislature who continued in office as members of this Legislature.

County	Senator	Party	Notes
Apache	Bert Colter*	Democrat	
Apache	Albert F. Anderson*	Republican	
Cochise	Dan S. Kitchel*	Democrat	
Cochise	A. R. Spikes*	Democrat	
Coconino	Thomas N. Knoles Jr.	Democrat	
Coconino	Fred F. Udine*	Democrat	
Gila	Clarence L. Carpenter*	Democrat	
Gila	William A. Sullivan*	Democrat	
Graham	Darvil B. McBride*	Democrat	
Graham	John Mickelson*	Democrat	
Greenlee	M. L. Sims*	Democrat	
Greenlee	Carl Gale*	Democrat	
Maricopa	Hilliard T. Brooke	Democrat	
Maricopa	Paul L. Singer	Republican	
Mohave	Earle W. Cook	Democrat	
Mohave	Robert Morrow*	Democrat	
Navajo	William Huso	Democrat	
Navajo	Glenn Blansett*	Democrat	
Pima	Sol Ahee	Democrat	
Pima	Hiram S. (Hi) Corbet*	Republican	
Pinal	Charles S. Goff*	Democrat	
Pinal	Ben Arnold*	Democrat	
Santa Cruz	C. B. (Bert) Smith	Democrat	
Santa Cruz	R. G. Michelena*	Democrat	
Yavapai	David H. Palmer*	Democrat	
Yavapai	Sam Steiger*	Republican	
Yuma	Harold C. Giss*	Democrat	
Yuma	R. H. Thompson*	Democrat	

== House of Representatives ==
=== Members ===
The asterisk (*) denotes members of the previous Legislature who continued in office as members of this Legislature.

County	Representative	Party	Notes
Apache	Jack A. Brown*	Democrat	
Cochise	Fred Burke	Democrat	
Cochise	James A. Elliott*	Democrat	
Cochise	Andrew J. Gilbert*	Democrat	
Coconino	Charles W. Sechrist	Democrat	
Coconino	Harold J. Scudder*	Democrat	
Gila	Nelson D. Breyton*	Democrat	
Gila	Edwynne C. (Polly) Rosenbaum*	Democrat	
Graham	Gordon L. Hoopes*	Democrat	
Greenlee	G. O. (Sonny) Biles*	Democrat	
Maricopa	William C. Attaway Jr.	Republican	
Maricopa	W. B. Barkley*	Democrat	
Maricopa	Robert Brewer*	Republican	
Maricopa	M. J. (Buck) Brown	Democrat	
Maricopa	Isabel Burgess*	Republican	
Maricopa	Elmer T. Burson*	Republican	
Maricopa	Cloves C. Campbell	Democrat	
Maricopa	Laron Waldo DeWitt*	Republican	
Maricopa	Geraldine F. Eliot*	Republican	
Maricopa	George W. Eubank*	Republican	
Maricopa	Al Franz	Democrat	
Maricopa	Ray A. Goetze	Republican	
Maricopa	Priscilla H. Hays*	Republican	
Maricopa	Oscar Henry	Democrat	
Maricopa	F. A. (Jake) Higgins*	Republican	
Maricopa	Jim Holley	Republican	
Maricopa	J. D. Holmes	Democrat	
Maricopa	Marshall Humphrey*	Republican	
Maricopa	Robert H. Hutto	Democrat	
Maricopa	Davidson Jenks	Republican	
Maricopa	Elmer G. King*	Democrat	
Maricopa	David B. Kret*	Republican	
Maricopa	R. Larry Oldham	Republican	
Maricopa	Ruth Peck*	Republican	
Maricopa	William S. Porter	Republican	
Maricopa	John C. Pritzlaff	Republican	
Maricopa	S. L. Pugh	Democrat	
Maricopa	Don Reese*	Republican	
Maricopa	T. C. Rhodes*	Democrat	
Maricopa	Archie C. Ryan*	Democrat	
Maricopa	James E. Shelley	Republican	
Maricopa	Walter P. Sherrill	Republican	
Maricopa	Bob Stump*	Democrat	
Maricopa	Leon Thompson	Democrat	
Maricopa	Martin P. Toscano*	Democrat	
Maricopa	Derek Van Dyke*	Republican	
Maricopa	John Vanlandingham	Democrat	
Maricopa	Wm. F. (Pat) Vipperman Jr.*	Democrat	
Maricopa	Robert C. Wilcox*	Republican	
Maricopa	Jim Young	Democrat	
Mohave	J. J. Glancy*	Democrat	
Navajo	Frank L. Crosby	Democrat	
Navajo	Clay Simer	Democrat	
Pima	Sandy P. Bowling	Democrat	
Pima	Tony Carrillo	Democrat	
Pima	Edward M. Chambers	Republican	
Pima	Evo J. De Concini	Democrat	
Pima	Harold L. Cook*	Democrat	
Pima	John H. Haugh*	Republican	
Pima	David G. Hawkins*	Republican	
Pima	Richard J. Herbert	Democrat	
Pima	Douglas S. Holsclaw*	Republican	
Pima	Etta Mae Hutcheson*	Democrat	
Pima	Ray Martin*	Democrat	
Pima	Forrest B. Pearce	Democrat	
Pima	Doris Varn*	Republican	
Pima	Emmett S. (Bud) Walker*	Democrat	
Pima	Thomas C. Webster*	Republican	
Pima	Alvin Wessler*	Republican	
Pima	Joe D. Ybarra*	Democrat	
Pinal	Charles Moody*	Democrat	
Pinal	Frederick S. Smith*	Democrat	
Pinal	Polly Getzwiller	Democrat	
Santa Cruz	Robert R. Hathaway*	Democrat	
Yavapai	Mabel S. Ellis*	Democrat	
Yavapai	Boyd Tenney	Republican	
Yavapai	Frank B. Ogden	Republican	
Yuma	M. G. (Pop) Miniken	Democrat	
Yuma	Charles A. Johnson	Democrat	
Yuma	C. L. (Charlie) Slane	Democrat	
