= Senator Stinson =

Senator Stinson may refer to:

- Bess Stinson (1902–1996), Arizona State Senate
- William G. Stinson (born 1945), Pennsylvania State Senate
