= 24th Arizona State Legislature =

Session of the Arizona Legislature

←	23rd	25th	→
- Arizona State Capitol (2014)

Overview
- Legislative body: Arizona State Legislature
- Jurisdiction: Arizona, United States
- Term: January 1, 1959 – December 31, 1960

Senate
- Members: 28
- Party control: Democratic (27–1)

House of Representatives
- Members: 80
- Party control: Democratic (55–25)

Sessions
- 1st: January 12 – March 31, 1959
- 2nd: January 11 – March 26, 1960

The 24th Arizona State Legislature, consisting of the Arizona State Senate and the Arizona House of Representatives, was constituted in Phoenix from January 1, 1959, to December 31, 1960, during the first of three terms of Paul Fannin's time as Governor of Arizona. The number of senators remained constant at two per county, totaling 28, and the members of the house of representatives also held steady at 80. The Democrats picked up a seat in the upper house, increasing their edge to 27–1. In the House, the Republicans picked up three seats, however the Democrats still held a 55–25 edge.

== Sessions ==
The Legislature met for two regular sessions at the State Capitol in Phoenix. The first opened on January 12, 1959, and adjourned on March 31; while the second convened on January 11, 1960, and adjourned on March 26. There were no Special Sessions.

== State Senate ==
=== Members ===
The asterisk (*) denotes members of the previous Legislature who continued in office as members of this Legislature.

County	Senator	Party	Notes
Apache	Lynn Lockhart*	Democrat	
Apache	Melvin C. Greer*	Democrat	
Cochise	Dan S. Kitchel*	Democrat	
Cochise	A. R. Spikes*	Democrat	
Coconino	Robert W. Prochnow*	Democrat	
Coconino	Fred F. Udine*	Democrat	
Gila	Clarence L. Carpenter*	Democrat	
Gila	William A. Sullivan*	Democrat	
Graham	Jim Smith	Democrat	
Graham	John Mickelson	Democrat	
Greenlee	M. L. Sims*	Democrat	
Greenlee	Carl Gale*	Democrat	
Maricopa	Hilliard T. Brooke	Democrat	
Maricopa	Frank G. Murphy*	Democrat	
Mohave	C. Clyde Bollinger**	Democrat	
Mohave	Thelma Bollinger**	Democrat	
Mohave	Robert Morrow*	Democrat	
Navajo	J. Morris Richards*	Democrat	
Navajo	Glenn Blansett	Democrat	
Pima	David S. Wine	Democrat	
Pima	Hiram S. (Hi) Corbet*	Republican	
Pinal	Charles S. Goff*	Democrat	
Pinal	Ben Arnold*	Democrat	
Santa Cruz	Neilson Brown*	Democrat	
Santa Cruz	C. B. (Bert) Smith*	Democrat	
Yavapai	David H. Palmer*	Democrat	
Yavapai	Charles H. Orme Sr.*	Democrat	
Yuma	Harold C. Giss*	Democrat	
Yuma	R. H. Thompson*	Democrat	

The ** denotes that Thelma Bollinger was appointed to the seat vacated upon the death of C. Clyde Bollinger

== House of Representatives ==
=== Members ===
The asterisk (*) denotes members of the previous Legislature who continued in office as members of this Legislature.

County	Representative	Party	Notes
Apache	James S. Shreeve*	Democrat	
Cochise	Charles O. Bloomquist*	Democrat	
Cochise	W. L. (Tay) Cook*	Democrat	
Cochise	Clyde M. Dalton*	Democrat	
Cochise	Andrew J. Gilbert	Democrat	
Coconino	Thomas N. Knoles Jr.*	Democrat	
Coconino	Harold J. Scudder*	Democrat	
Gila	Nelson D. Breyton*	Democrat	
Gila	R. E. (Arky) Burnham	Democrat	
Gila	Edwynne C. "Polly" Rosenbaum*	Democrat	
Graham	Milton Lines*	Democrat	
Graham	E. L. Tidwell*	Democrat	
Greenlee	Tom W. Berry*	Democrat	
Greenlee	G. O. Biles*	Democrat	
Maricopa	Carl Austin*	Democrat	
Maricopa	W. B. Barkley*	Democrat	
Maricopa	Frank Bowman	Democrat	
Maricopa	Lewis B. Bramkamp*	Democrat	
Maricopa	Robert Brewer*	Republican	
Maricopa	Elmer T. Burson	Republican	
Maricopa	David H. Campbell*	Republican	
Maricopa	Conrad James Carreon*	Democrat	
Maricopa	Sherman R. Dent*	Democrat	
Maricopa	Laron Waldo DeWitt*	Republican	
Maricopa	Marie S. Earl*	Democrat	
Maricopa	Geraldine F. Eliot*	Republican	
Maricopa	Jack E. Gardner*	Democrat	
Maricopa	Chet Goldberg Jr.	Republican	
Maricopa	J. O. Grimes*	Democrat	
Maricopa	Merle E. Hays	Democrat	
Maricopa	Priscilla H. Hays	Republican	
Maricopa	F. A. (Jake) Higgins*	Republican	
Maricopa	Marshall Humphrey	Republican	
Maricopa	Emogene M. Jennings*	Republican	
Maricopa	Sidney Kartus	Democrat	
Maricopa	Elmer G. King	Democrat	
Maricopa	W. I. (Ike) Lowry*	Republican	
Maricopa	Gene B. McClellan	Republican	
Maricopa	Robert L. Myers	Republican	
Maricopa	Charles H. Oatman	Democrat	
Maricopa	Ruth Peck	Republican	
Maricopa	William S. Porter	Republican	
Maricopa	S. Earl Pugh*	Democrat	
Maricopa	Don Reese	Republican	
Maricopa	T. C. Rhodes*	Democrat	
Maricopa	Arthur B. Schellenberg*	Republican	
Maricopa	Carl Sims Sr.*	Democrat	
Maricopa	Bill Stephens*	Democrat	
Maricopa	Bob Stump	Democrat	
Maricopa	Martin P. Toscano	Democrat	
Maricopa	Wm. F. (Pat) Vipperman Jr.	Democrat	
Mohave	J. J. Glancy*	Democrat	
Navajo	Lee F. Dover*	Democrat	
Navajo	Augusta T. Larson*	Republican	
Pima	W. G. "Bill" Bodell*	Republican	
Pima	Emilio Carrillo	Democrat	
Pima	Harold L. Cook*	Democrat	
Pima	Arnold Elias	Democrat	
Pima	Thomas D. Fridena*	Democrat	
Pima	John H. Haugh*	Republican	
Pima	David G. Hawkins	Republican	
Pima	Douglas S. Holsclaw*	Republican	
Pima	V. S. Hostetter*	Republican	
Pima	Etta Mae Hutcheson*	Democrat	
Pima	James L. Kennedy	Democrat	
Pima	Ray Martin	Democrat	
Pima	William I. Minor	Democrat	
Pima	Emmett S. (Bud) Walker	Democrat	
Pima	Thomas C. Webster	Republican	
Pima	Alvin Wessler*	Republican	
Pinal	Charles Moody	Democrat	
Pinal	Frederick S. Smith*	Democrat	
Pinal	E. Blodwen Thode*	Democrat	
Santa Cruz	Robert R. Hathaway*	Democrat	
Yavapai	Joseph L. Allen	Democrat	
Yavapai	Mabel S. Ellis*	Democrat	
Yavapai	M. A. Lindner*	Democrat	
Yuma	Clara Osborne Botzum	Democrat	
Yuma	Robert L. Klauer*	Democrat	
Yuma	Cecil D. Miller	Democrat	
