= 1964 Arizona Senate election =

- November 3, 1964

All 28 seats of the Arizona Senate 15 seats needed for a majority
	Majority party	Minority party
Party	Democratic	Republican
Seats before	24	4
Seats after	26	2
Seat change	▲2	▼2
Senate President before election
Clarence L. Carpenter
Democratic
Elected Senate President
Clarence L. Carpenter
Democratic

The 1964 Arizona Senate election was held on November 3, 1964. Voters elected all 28 members of the Arizona Senate to serve two-year terms. At the time, each of Arizona's 14 counties elected two state senators for a total of 28 members of the Arizona Senate. Primary elections were held on September 8, 1964.

Prior to the elections, the Democrats held a supermajority of 24 seats over the 4 Republican seats.

Following the election, Democrats maintained control of the chamber and increased their supermajority to 26 Democrats to 2 Republicans. The newly elected senators served in the 27th Arizona State Legislature, which met for two regular sessions at the State Capitol in Phoenix. The first opened on January 11, 1965, and adjourned on April 20; while the second convened on January 10, 1966, and adjourned on April 23. There were four Special Sessions, all in 1965. The first Special Session convened April 21, 1965, and adjourned sine die on May 10; the second convened on May 11, 1965, and adjourned sine die on June 15; the Third Special session convened on June 16, 1965, and adjourned sine die on July 1; with the final Special Session, the fourth, convened September 13, 1965, and adjourned sine die on October 9.

The Democrats had a net gain of 2 seats in the Arizona Senate following the election.

== Summary of Results by County ==
County	Incumbent	Party	Elected Senator	Outcome
Apache	Bert J. Colter	Dem	Walter Pulsipher	Dem Hold
Apache	Albert F. Anderson	Rep	Milford Hall	Dem Gain
Cochise	A. R. Spikes	Dem	A. R. Spikes	Dem Hold
Cochise	Dan S. Kitchel	Dem	Dan S. Kitchel	Dem Hold
Coconino	Fred F. Udine	Dem	Fred F. Udine	Dem Hold
Coconino	Thomas M. "Tommy" Knoles Jr.	Dem	Thomas M. "Tommy" Knoles Jr.	Dem Hold
Gila	Clarence L. Carpenter	Dem	Clarence L. Carpenter	Dem Hold
Gila	William A. Sullivan	Dem	William A. Sullivan	Dem Hold
Graham	John Mickelson	Dem	John Mickelson	Dem Hold
Graham	Darvil B. McBride	Dem	Darvil B. McBride	Dem Hold
Greenlee	M. L. (Marshall) Simms	Dem	M. L. (Marshall) Simms	Dem Hold
Greenlee	Carl Gale	Dem	John W. (Mac) McLaughlin	Dem Hold
Maricopa	Joe Haldiman Jr.	Dem	B. C. Rhodes (Note: Senator Rhodes died on June 21, 1965, during the 3rd Special Session of the 27th Arizona State Legislature. The Maricopa County Board of Supervisors appointed Mr. George W. Peck, of Phoenix, to succeed Senator Rhodes.)	Dem Hold
Maricopa	Dr. Paul L. Singer	Rep	John Conlan	Rep Hold
Mohave	Earle W. Cook	Dem	Earle W. Cook	Dem Hold
Mohave	Robert E. Morrow	Dem	Robert E. Morrow	Dem Hold
Navajo	Glenn Blansett	Dem	Glenn Blansett	Dem Hold
Navajo	William "Bill" Huso	Dem	William "Bill" Huso	Dem Hold
Pima	Hiram S. (Hi) Corbett	Rep	Edward I. Kennedy	Dem Gain
Pima	Sol Ahee	Dem	Sol Ahee	Dem Hold
Pinal	Ben Arnold	Dem	Ben Arnold	Dem Hold
Pinal	Charles S. Goff	Dem	Mrs. E. B. Thode	Dem Hold
Santa Cruz	C. B. (Bert) Smith	Dem	C. B. (Bert) Smith	Dem Hold
Santa Cruz	R. G. Michelena	Dem	Robert Hathaway	Dem Hold
Yavapai	Sam Steiger	Rep	Boyd Tenney	Rep Hold
Yavapai	David H. Palmer	Dem	David H. Palmer	Dem Hold
Yuma	Harold C. Giss	Dem	Harold C. Giss	Dem Hold
Yuma	Ray H. Thompson	Dem	Ray H. Thompson	Dem Hold

== Detailed Results ==
=== Apache District ===
General election results
Party	Candidate	Votes	%
Democratic	Walter Pulsipher	2,092	34.84%
Democratic	Milford Hall	2,046	34.07%
Republican	Albert F. Anderson (incumbent)	1,867	31.09%
Total votes		6,005	100.00%
Democratic hold			
Democratic gain from Republican			

=== Cochise District ===
General election results
Party	Candidate	Votes	%
Democratic	Dan S. Kitchel (incumbent)	10,591	40.36%
Democratic	A.R. Spikes (incumbent)	10,296	39.24%
Republican	Ted Kraft	5,352	20.40%
Total votes		26,239	100.00%
Democratic hold			
Democratic hold			

=== Coconino District ===
General election results
Party	Candidate	Votes	%
Democratic	Thomas M. "Tommy" Knoles Jr. (incumbent)	6,936	52.71%
Democratic	Fred F. Udine (incumbent)	6,224	47.29%
Total votes		13,160	100.00%
Democratic hold			
Democratic hold			

=== Gila District ===
General election results
Party	Candidate	Votes	%
Democratic	Clarence L. Carpenter (incumbent)	7,378	42.53%
Democratic	William A. Sullivan (incumbent)	6,234	35.94%
Republican	Jim Harbison	3,735	21.53%
Total votes		17,347	100.00%
Democratic hold			
Democratic hold			

=== Graham District ===
General election results
Party	Candidate	Votes	%
Democratic	Darvil B. McBride (incumbent)	3,081	35.03%
Democratic	John Mickelson (incumbent)	3,045	34.62%
Republican	Seth G. Mattice	2,670	30.35%
Total votes		8,796	100.00%
Democratic hold			
Democratic hold			

=== Greenlee District ===
General election results
Party	Candidate	Votes	%
Democratic	John W. (Mac) McLaughlin	3,586	51.13%
Democratic	M. L. (Marshall) Simms (incumbent)	3,427	48.87%
Total votes		7,013	100.00%
Democratic hold			
Democratic hold			

=== Maricopa District ===
General election results
Party	Candidate	Votes	%
Republican	John Conlan	126,488	25.62%
Democratic	B. C. Rhodes	124,368	25.19%
Republican	George W. Diefenderfer	122,894	24.89%
Democratic	Wing Ong	120,011	24.31%
Total votes		493,761	100.00%
Republican hold			
Democratic hold			

=== Mohave District ===
General election results
Party	Candidate	Votes	%
Democratic	Robert E. Morrow (incumbent)	2,574	37.65%
Democratic	Earle W. Cook (incumbent)	2,339	34.21%
Republican	H. D. Kreft	1,924	28.14%
Total votes		6,837	100.00%
Democratic hold			
Democratic hold			

=== Navajo District ===
General election results
Party	Candidate	Votes	%
Democratic	William "Bill" Huso (incumbent)	5,461	31.73%
Democratic	Glenn Blansett (incumbent)	4,691	27.25%
Republican	Robert T. (Bob) Jenkins	4,221	24.52%
Republican	J. Kimball "Kim" Shelley	2,839	16.49%
Total votes		17,212	100.00%
Democratic hold			
Democratic hold			

=== Pima District ===
General election results
Party	Candidate	Votes	%
Democratic	Sol Ahee (incumbent)	58,121	36.53%
Democratic	Edward I. Kennedy	53,444	33.59%
Republican	Hiram S. (Hi) Corbett (incumbent)	47,530	29.88%
Total votes		159,095	100.00%
Democratic hold			
Democratic gain from Republican			

=== Pinal District ===
General election results
Party	Candidate	Votes	%
Democratic	Mrs. E. B. Thode	10,697	40.64%
Democratic	Ben Arnold (incumbent)	10,611	40.31%
Republican	George Wake	5,013	19.05%
Total votes		26,321	100.00%
Democratic hold			
Democratic hold			

=== Santa Cruz District ===
General election results
Party	Candidate	Votes	%
Democratic	Robert Hathaway	2,575	52.74%
Democratic	C. B. (Bert) Smith (incumbent)	2,307	47.26%
Total votes		4,882	100.00%
Democratic hold			
Democratic hold			

=== Yavapai District ===
General election results
Party	Candidate	Votes	%
Democratic	David H. Palmer (incumbent)	6,914	27.79%
Republican	Boyd Tenney	6,678	26.85%
Republican	A. M. (Al) Crawford	6,510	26.17%
Democratic	A. H. (Hank) Bisjack	4,774	19.19%
Total votes		24,876	100.00%
Democratic hold			
Republican hold			

=== Yuma District ===
General election results
Party	Candidate	Votes	%
Democratic	Harold C. Giss (incumbent)	10,409	51.39%
Democratic	Ray H. Thompson (incumbent)	9,844	48.61%
Total votes		20,253	100.00%
Democratic hold			
Democratic hold			
