= Senator Ellsworth (disambiguation) =

Oliver Ellsworth (1745–1807) was a U.S. Senator from Connecticut from 1789 to 1796. Senator Ellsworth may also refer to:

- D. Delos Ellsworth (1931–2013), Arizona State Senate
- Harris Ellsworth (1899–1986), Oregon State Senate
- Jason Ellsworth (born 1973), Montana State Senate
- Stukely Ellsworth (1769–1837), New York State Senate
- Timothy E. Ellsworth (1836–1904), New York State Senate
