= 1962 Arizona Senate election =

- November 6, 1962

All 28 seats of the Arizona Senate 15 seats needed for a majority
	Majority party	Minority party
Party	Democratic	Republican
Seats before	24	4
Seats after	24	4
Seat change	Steady	Steady
Senate President before election
Clarence L. Carpenter
Democratic
Elected Senate President
Clarence L. Carpenter
Democratic

The 1962 Arizona Senate election was held on November 6, 1962. Voters elected all 28 members of the Arizona Senate to serve two-year terms. At the time, each of Arizona's 14 counties elected two state senators for a total of 28 members of the Arizona Senate. Primary elections were held on September 11, 1962.

Prior to the elections, the Democrats held a supermajority of 24 seats over the 4 Republican seats.

Following the election, Democrats maintained control of the chamber and their supermajority with 24 Democrats to 4 Republicans. The newly elected senators served in the 26th Arizona State Legislature, which met for two regular sessions at the State Capitol in Phoenix. The first opened on January 14, 1963, and adjourned on April 2; while the second convened on January 13, 1964, and adjourned on April 15. There were two Special Sessions, the first of which convened April 4, 1963, and adjourned sine die on April 4; while the second convened on May 27, 1963, and adjourned sine die on June 3.

The balance of power in the Arizona Senate remained steady at 24 Democrats to 4 Republicans following the election.

== Summary of Results by County ==
County	Incumbent	Party	Elected Senator	Outcome
Apache	Bert J. Colter	Dem	Bert J. Colter	Dem Hold
Apache	Albert F. Anderson	Rep	Albert F. Anderson	Rep Hold
Cochise	A. R. Spikes	Dem	A. R. Spikes	Dem Hold
Cochise	Dan S. Kitchel	Dem	Dan S. Kitchel	Dem Hold
Coconino	Fred F. Udine	Dem	Fred F. Udine	Dem Hold
Coconino	Robert W. Prochnow	Dem	Thomas M. "Tommy" Knoles Jr.	Dem Hold
Gila	Clarence L. Carpenter	Dem	Clarence L. Carpenter	Dem Hold
Gila	William A. Sullivan	Dem	William A. Sullivan	Dem Hold
Graham	John Mickelson	Dem	John Mickelson	Dem Hold
Graham	Darvil B. McBride	Dem	Darvil B. McBride	Dem Hold
Greenlee	M. L. (Marshall) Simms	Dem	M. L. (Marshall) Simms	Dem Hold
Greenlee	Carl Gale	Dem	Carl Gale	Dem Hold
Maricopa	Joe Haldiman Jr.	Dem	Hilliard T. Brooke	Dem Hold
Maricopa	Evan Mecham	Rep	Dr. Paul L. Singer	Rep Hold
Mohave	Thelma Bollinger	Dem	Earle W. Cook	Dem Hold
Mohave	Robert E. Morrow	Dem	Robert E. Morrow	Dem Hold
Navajo	Glenn Blansett	Dem	Glenn Blansett	Dem Hold
Navajo	J. Morris Richards	Dem	William "Bill" Huso	Dem Hold
Pima	Hiram S. (Hi) Corbett	Rep	Hiram S. (Hi) Corbett	Rep Hold
Pima	David Wine	Dem	Sol Ahee	Dem Hold
Pinal	Ben Arnold	Dem	Ben Arnold	Dem Hold
Pinal	Charles S. Goff	Dem	Charles S. Goff	Dem Hold
Santa Cruz	Neilson Brown	Dem	C. B. (Bert) Smith	Dem Hold
Santa Cruz	R. G. Michelena	Dem	R. G. Michelena	Dem Hold
Yavapai	Sam Steiger	Rep	Sam Steiger	Rep Hold
Yavapai	David H. Palmer	Dem	David H. Palmer	Dem Hold
Yuma	Harold C. Giss	Dem	Harold C. Giss	Dem Hold
Yuma	Ray H. Thompson	Dem	Ray H. Thompson	Dem Hold

== Detailed Results ==
=== Apache District ===
General election results
Party	Candidate	Votes	%
Democratic	Bert J. Colter (incumbent)	1,685	38.41%
Republican	Albert F. Anderson (incumbent)	1,562	35.61%
Democratic	N. H. (Hal) Wiltbank	1,140	25.99%
Total votes		4,387	100.00%
Democratic hold			
Republican hold			

=== Cochise District ===
General election results
Party	Candidate	Votes	%
Democratic	A.R. Spikes (incumbent)	9,816	50.29%
Democratic	Dan S. Kitchel (incumbent)	9,701	49.71%
Total votes		19,517	100.00%
Democratic hold			
Democratic hold			

=== Coconino District ===
General election results
Party	Candidate	Votes	%
Democratic	Thomas M. "Tommy" Knoles Jr.	4,618	35.75%
Democratic	Fred F. Udine (incumbent)	4,567	35.36%
Republican	Walter D. Bennett	3,732	28.89%
Total votes		12,917	100.00%
Democratic hold			
Democratic hold			

=== Gila District ===
General election results
Party	Candidate	Votes	%
Democratic	Clarence L. Carpenter (incumbent)	6,913	52.38%
Democratic	William A. Sullivan (incumbent)	6,286	47.62%
Total votes		13,199	100.00%
Democratic hold			
Democratic hold			

=== Graham District ===
General election results
Party	Candidate	Votes	%
Democratic	Darvil B. McBride (incumbent)	2,855	50.67%
Democratic	John Mickelson (incumbent)	2,779	49.33%
Total votes		5,634	100.00%
Democratic hold			
Democratic hold			

=== Greenlee District ===
General election results
Party	Candidate	Votes	%
Democratic	M. L. (Marshall) Simms (incumbent)	3,550	50.61%
Democratic	Carl Gale (incumbent)	3,465	49.39%
Total votes		7,015	100.00%
Democratic hold			
Democratic hold			

=== Maricopa District ===
General election results
Party	Candidate	Votes	%
Republican	Dr. Paul L. Singer	102,862	28.04%
Democratic	Hilliard T. Brooke	91,121	24.84%
Republican	Stan Davies	90,206	24.59%
Democratic	Ray Busey	82,627	22.53%
Total votes		366,816	100.00%
Republican hold			
Democratic hold			

=== Mohave District ===
General election results
Party	Candidate	Votes	%
Democratic	Robert E. Morrow (incumbent)	1,850	39.36%
Democratic	Earle W. Cook	1,564	33.28%
Republican	Howard H. Heilman	1,286	27.36%
Total votes		4,700	100.00%
Democratic hold			
Democratic hold			

=== Navajo District ===
General election results
Party	Candidate	Votes	%
Democratic	William "Bill" Huso	3,858	31.89%
Democratic	Glenn Blansett (incumbent)	3,822	31.59%
Republican	Eldon Shelley	2,942	24.32%
Republican	Kenneth Leroy English	1,477	12.21%
Total votes		12,099	100.00%
Democratic hold			
Democratic hold			

=== Pima District ===
General election results
Party	Candidate	Votes	%
Republican	Hiram S. (Hi) Corbett (incumbent)	37,869	28.12%
Democratic	Sol Ahee	34,230	25.42%
Republican	Arnold Jeffers	32,885	24.42%
Democratic	F. T. "Limie" Gibbings	29,681	22.04%
Total votes		134,665	100.00%
Republican hold			
Democratic hold			

=== Pinal District ===
General election results
Party	Candidate	Votes	%
Democratic	Ben Arnold (incumbent)	9,362	43.48%
Democratic	Charles S. Goff (incumbent)	7,915	36.76%
Republican	Kenneth Rogers	4,253	19.75%
Total votes		21,530	100.00%
Democratic hold			
Democratic hold			

=== Santa Cruz District ===
General election results
Party	Candidate	Votes	%
Democratic	C. B. (Bert) Smith	2,367	43.18%
Democratic	R. G. Michelena (incumbent)	1,658	30.24%
Republican	L. E. (Doc) Sexton	1,457	26.58%
Total votes		5,482	100.00%
Democratic hold			
Democratic hold			

=== Yavapai District ===
General election results
Party	Candidate	Votes	%
Republican	Sam Steiger (incumbent)	5,929	34.82%
Democratic	David H. Palmer (incumbent)	5,870	34.47%
Democratic	Charles H. "Chick" Orme, Sr.	5,229	30.71%
Total votes		17,028	100.00%
Republican hold			
Democratic hold			

=== Yuma District ===
General election results
Party	Candidate	Votes	%
Democratic	Harold C. Giss (incumbent)	8,880	52.09%
Democratic	Ray H. Thompson (incumbent)	8,169	47.91%
Total votes		17,049	100.00%
Democratic hold			
Democratic hold			
