= 1958 Arizona Senate election =

- November 4, 1958

All 28 seats of the Arizona Senate 15 seats needed for a majority
	Majority party	Minority party
Party	Democratic	Republican
Seats before	26	2
Seats after	27	1
Seat change	▲1	▼1
Senate President before election
Clarence L. Carpenter
Democratic
Elected Senate President
Clarence L. Carpenter
Democratic

The 1958 Arizona Senate election was held on November 4, 1958. Voters elected all 28 members of the Arizona Senate to serve two-year terms. At the time, each of Arizona's 14 counties elected two state senators for a total of 28 members of the Arizona Senate. Primary elections were held on September 9, 1958.

Prior to the elections, the Democrats held a supermajority of 26 seats over the Republicans' 2 seats.

Following the election, Democrats maintained control of the chamber and increased their supermajority by one seat to 27 Democrats to 1 Republican. The newly elected senators served in the 24th Arizona State Legislature, which met for two regular sessions at the State Capitol in Phoenix. The first opened on January 12, 1959, and adjourned on March 31; while the second convened on January 11, 1960, and adjourned on March 26.

== Summary of Results by County ==
County	Incumbent	Party	Elected Senator	Outcome
Apache	Lynn Lockhart	Dem	Lynn Lockhart	Dem Hold
Apache	Melvin C. Greer	Dem	Melvin C. Greer	Dem Hold
Cochise	A. R. Spikes	Dem	A. R. Spikes	Dem Hold
Cochise	Dan S. Kitchel	Dem	Dan S. Kitchel	Dem Hold
Coconino	Robert W. Prochnow	Dem	Robert W. Prochnow	Dem Hold
Coconino	Fred F. Udine	Dem	Fred F. Udine	Dem Hold
Gila	Clarence L. Carpenter	Dem	Clarence L. Carpenter	Dem Hold
Gila	William A. Sullivan	Dem	William A. Sullivan	Dem Hold
Graham	Wilford R. Richardson	Dem	Jim Smith	Dem Hold
Graham	W. B. Mattice	Dem	John Mickelson	Dem Hold
Greenlee	M. L. (Marshall) Sims	Dem	M. L. (Marshall) Sims	Dem Hold
Greenlee	Carl Gale	Dem	Carl Gale	Dem Hold
Maricopa	Joe Haldiman Jr.	Dem	Hilliard T. Brooke	Dem Hold
Maricopa	Frank G. Murphy	Dem	Frank G. Murphy	Dem Hold
Mohave	Earle Cook	Dem	C. Clyde Bollinger (Note: Senator C. Clyde Bollinger died in office. His wife, Thelma Bollinger, was appointed to fill the seat for the remainder of the term.)	Dem Hold
Mohave	Robert E. Morrow	Dem	Robert E. Morrow	Dem Hold
Navajo	William R. Bourdon	Rep	Glenn Blansett	Dem Gain
Navajo	J. Morris Richards	Dem	J. Morris Richards	Dem Hold
Pima	Hiram H. (Hi) Corbett	Rep	Hiram H. (Hi) Corbett	Rep Hold
Pima	Harry Ackerman	Dem	David Wine	Dem Hold
Pinal	Ben Arnold	Dem	Ben Arnold	Dem Hold
Pinal	Charles S. Goff	Dem	Charles S. Goff	Dem Hold
Santa Cruz	Neilson Brown	Dem	Neilson Brown	Dem Hold
Santa Cruz	C. B. (Bert) Smith	Dem	C. B. (Bert) Smith	Dem Hold
Yavapai	Charles H. (Chick) Orme, Sr.	Dem	Charles H. (Chick) Orme, Sr.	Dem Hold
Yavapai	David H. Palmer	Dem	David H. Palmer	Dem Hold
Yuma	Harold C. Giss	Dem	Harold C. Giss	Dem Hold
Yuma	Ray H. Thompson	Dem	Ray H. Thompson	Dem Hold

== Detailed Results ==
=== Apache District ===
General election results
Party	Candidate	Votes	%
Democratic	Melvin C. Greer (incumbent)	1,712	50.31%
Democratic	Lynn Lockhart (incumbent)	1,691	49.69%
Total votes		3,403	100.00%
Democratic hold			
Democratic hold			

=== Cochise District ===
General election results
Party	Candidate	Votes	%
Democratic	A.R. Spikes (incumbent)	8,754	50.01%
Democratic	Dan S. Kitchel (incumbent)	8,750	49.99%
Total votes		17,504	100.00%
Democratic hold			
Democratic hold			

=== Coconino District ===
General election results
Party	Candidate	Votes	%
Democratic	Robert W. Prochnow (incumbent)	4,940	53.47%
Democratic	Fred F. Udine (incumbent)	4,299	46.53%
Total votes		9,239	100.00%
Democratic hold			
Democratic hold			

=== Gila District ===
General election results
Party	Candidate	Votes	%
Democratic	Clarence L. Carpenter (incumbent)	6,557	50.86%
Democratic	William A. Sullivan (incumbent)	6,334	49.14%
Total votes		12,891	100.00%
Democratic hold			
Democratic hold			

=== Graham District ===
General election results
Party	Candidate	Votes	%
Democratic	John Mickelson	2,901	52.27%
Democratic	Jim Smith	2,649	47.73%
Total votes		5,550	100.00%
Democratic hold			
Democratic hold			

=== Greenlee District ===
General election results
Party	Candidate	Votes	%
Democratic	M. L. (Marshall) Sims (incumbent)	3,589	51.37%
Democratic	Carl Gale (incumbent)	3,398	48.63%
Total votes		6,987	100.00%
Democratic hold			
Democratic hold			

=== Maricopa District ===
General election results
Party	Candidate	Votes	%
Democratic	Frank G. Murphy (incumbent)	74,683	27.40%
Democratic	Hilliard T. Brooke	71,508	26.23%
Republican	Charles H. Garland	64,735	23.75%
Republican	William R. Pyper	61,682	22.63%
Total votes		272,608	100.00%
Democratic hold			
Democratic hold			

=== Mohave District ===
General election results
Party	Candidate	Votes	%
Democratic	Robert Morrow (incumbent)	1,774	41.72%
Democratic	C. Clyde Bollinger	1,763	41.46%
Republican	Ben R. Joy	715	16.82%
Total votes		4,252	100.00%
Democratic hold			
Democratic hold			

=== Navajo District ===
General election results
Party	Candidate	Votes	%
Democratic	Glenn Blansett	3,458	36.23%
Democratic	J. Morris Richards (incumbent)	3,217	33.71%
Republican	William R. Bourdon (incumbent)	2,869	30.06%
Total votes		9,544	100.00%
Democratic gain from Republican			
Democratic hold			

=== Pima District ===
General election results
Party	Candidate	Votes	%
Democratic	David Wine	32,885	34.85%
Republican	Hiram S. (Hi) Corbett (incumbent)	32,267	34.20%
Democratic	Thomas Collins	29,198	30.95%
Total votes		94,350	100.00%
Democratic hold			
Republican hold			

=== Pinal District ===
General election results
Party	Candidate	Votes	%
Democratic	Ben Arnold (incumbent)	8,104	51.65%
Democratic	Charles S. Goff (incumbent)	7,586	48.35%
Total votes		15,690	100.00%
Democratic hold			
Democratic hold			

=== Santa Cruz District ===
General election results
Party	Candidate	Votes	%
Democratic	C. B. (Bert) Smith (incumbent)	1,887	40.11%
Democratic	Neilson Brown (incumbent)	1,843	39.17%
Republican	Lawrence E. Sexton	975	20.72%
Total votes		4,705	100.00%
Democratic hold			
Democratic hold			

=== Yavapai District ===
General election results
Party	Candidate	Votes	%
Democratic	David H. Palmer (incumbent)	6,233	50.41%
Democratic	Charles H. (Chick) Orme, Sr. (incumbent)	6,132	49.59%
Total votes		12,365	100.00%
Democratic hold			
Democratic hold			

=== Yuma District ===
General election results
Party	Candidate	Votes	%
Democratic	Harold C. Giss (incumbent)	7,535	53.07%
Democratic	Ray H. Thompson (incumbent)	6,664	46.93%
Total votes		14,199	100.00%
Democratic hold			
Democratic hold			
