= Ethel Maynard =

American politician (1905–1980)

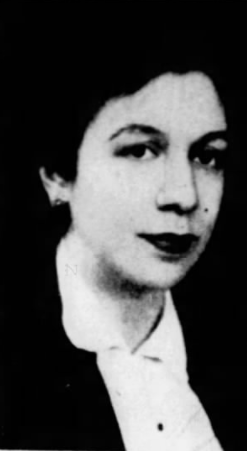
- Maynard in 1966

Member of the Arizona House of Representatives
- In office 1967–1973 Serving with Etta Mae Hutcheson
- Succeeded by: Emilio Carrillo
- Constituency: 7th district – Seat B 11th district

Personal details
- Born: Ethel Reed Maynard; November 23, 1905 Waterbury, Connecticut, U.S.
- Died: May 20, 1980 (aged 74)
- Party: Democratic
- Spouse: Aubre de Lambert Maynard (m. 1928–1930)
- Children: 1

Ethel Reed Maynard (November 23, 1905 – May 20, 1980) was an American politician, activist, and registered nurse who served in the Arizona House of Representatives as a member of the Democratic Party. She was the first black woman to serve in the Arizona Legislature.

Maynard was born in Waterbury, Connecticut, and spent eighteen years as a registered nurse in Harlem, New York, before moving to Tucson, Arizona, in 1946. During the 1950s she served as an officer in the Arizona NAACP and was active in the Arizona Democratic Party, serving as a committee-member on the precinct and ward level, and attending the 1956 Democratic National Convention. In 1966, she was elected to the Arizona House of Representatives and served until she was defeated in the 1972 elections.

== Early life ==
Ethel Reed Maynard was born in Waterbury, Connecticut, on November 23, 1905. She worked as a registered nurse in Harlem, New York, for eighteen years before moving to Tucson, Arizona, in 1946. After moving to Tucson she started working at the Tucson Medical Center where she would work for over twenty years. She married Aubre de Lambert Maynard on August 15, 1928, with whom she had one child before divorcing in 1930.

== Career ==
Maynard was selected to serve as second vice-president of the Arizona NAACP in 1951. She also served as vice-president of the Tucson Council for Civic Unity, a civil rights organization. She founded the Safford Area Council of the Tucson Committee for Economic Opportunity and served on its board of executives. Maynard also served on the board of Planned Parenthood.

In 1954, she was elected as a Democratic state committee-member from the sixth precinct. In 1955, she was elected as a committee-member from the 1st ward in Tucson, Arizona. During the 1956 presidential election she served as a delegate to the Democratic National Convention. She was appointed to the advisory board of the Tucson Democratic Central Committee by chairman W. Evans Bagley in 1957, and later named to the board of directors of the Tucson Democratic Central Committee in 1959.

On July 19, 1963, Maynard announced that she would seek the Democratic nomination for a seat on the Tucson city council from ward one, but placed fourth out of four candidates. In the general election she received twenty write-in votes for city council and three in the mayoral election.

=== Arizona House of Representatives ===
In July 1966, Maynard announced that she would seek the Democratic nomination for a seat in the Arizona House of Representatives from the 7th district. She won in the general election, becoming the first black woman elected to the Arizona legislature. She was reelected in 1968 and 1970. Maynard unsuccessfully sought a fourth term in 1972.

During her tenure in the Arizona House of Representatives, Maynard served on the Judiciary, Suffrage and Elections, and Public Health and Welfare committees.

Maynard was appointed to serve on the public health and welfare and state government committees during the 28th session of the Arizona legislature in 1967. She and Leon Thompson introduced legislation to reestablish Arizona's Commission on the Status of Women, which had been originally established by Governor Samuel Pearson Goddard Jr. in 1966, before being disestablished in 1967, leaving Arizona as one of two states without such a commission. Maynard served as a member of the 1968 Tucson Commission on Human Relations which oversaw racial integration in multiple areas.

== Death and legacy ==
On May 20, 1980, Maynard died from heart failure. She was inducted into the Arizona Women's Hall of Fame in 2006. Since her tenure twenty-one black people have been elected to the Arizona House of Representatives, with six being female and fifteen being male.

== See also ==
- Female state legislators in the United States
- List of African-American U.S. state firsts
- List of first African-American U.S. state legislators
