= Tony Carrillo (politician) =

American politician and educator (1936–2020)

Tony Sotomayor Carrillo (November 16, 1936 – May 9, 2020) was an American politician and educator.

Carrillo was born in Tucson, Arizona. He received his bachelor's and master's degree from the University of Arizona. He served in the Arizona House of Representatives from 1963 to 1969 and was a Democrat. Carrillo received his doctorate degree in education from Wayne State University and then taught at Arizona State University. Carrillo taught at San Jose State University in San Jose, California and was chairman of the educational administration department. Carrillo served on the San Jose East Side Unified High School District Board. Carrillo died in Clovis, California.
