= Timothy A. Barrow =

American politician (1934–2019)

51st Mayor of Phoenix
- In office January 2, 1974 – January 2, 1976
- Preceded by: John D. Driggs
- Succeeded by: Margaret Hance

Member of the Arizona House of Representatives
- In office 1966–1973

Personal details
- Born: January 30, 1934 Franklin, Pennsylvania, U.S.
- Died: March 16, 2019 (aged 85) Sun City, Arizona, U.S.
- Party: Republican
- Education: New Mexico Military Institute; John F. Kennedy School of Government
- Occupation: consultant

Timothy Arthur Barrow (January 30, 1934 – March 16, 2019) was an American politician who served one term as the Mayor of Phoenix from 1974 to 1976.

== Biography ==
Barrow was born in Franklin, Pennsylvania, and moved to Arizona in his childhood. He attended the New Mexico Military Institute and served in the United States Army overseas in West Germany. When he returned to the United States, he was a trust officer at a bank, and director of a hospital. He was elected as a Republican to the Arizona House of Representatives in 1966, and served until his election as Mayor of Phoenix in 1973. During his term in the House, he sat on the Ways and Means Committee, and had stints as majority whip (1969) and Speaker of the House (1971). He was elected as Mayor of Phoenix in 1973, and served one term. He later attended the John F. Kennedy School of Government and worked as a consultant.

Barrow died on March 16, 2019.
