= John H. Haugh =

American politician

Member of the Arizona House of Representatives
- In office 1953–1967
- In office 1969–1971

Speaker of the Arizona House of Representatives
- In office 1969–1971
- Preceded by: Stan Turley
- Succeeded by: Timothy A. Barrow

Personal details
- Born: November 1, 1910 Clinton, Iowa, U.S.
- Died: July 2, 1996 (aged 85)
- Party: Republican
- Education: Lake Forest College; University of California, Los Angeles

John H. Haugh (November 1, 1910 – July 2, 1996) was an American politician. He served as a Republican member of the Arizona House of Representatives.

== Life and career ==
Haugh was born in Clinton, Iowa. He attended Lake Forest College and the University of California, Los Angeles.

Haugh served in the Arizona House of Representatives from 1953 to 1967 and again from 1969 to 1971.

Haugh died on July 2, 1996, at the age of 85.
