= Bess Stinson =

American politician and businesswoman (1902–1996)

Bessie Bryant Stinson (December 24, 1902 – July 19, 1996) was an American politician and businesswoman.

Born in Hammon, Rogers Mills County, Oklahoma Territory, Stinson went to the University of Oklahoma and Draughon's Business College in Clinton, Oklahoma. In 1938, Stinson moved to Phoenix, Arizona. She worked in financial and business offices of various businesses in Arizona and Oklahoma. During World War II, Stinson served in the Women's Army Corps. She was involved in the Republican Party. From 1976 to 1971, Stinson served in the Arizona House of Representatives. Then, she served in the Arizona State Senate from 1971 to 1975. Stinson died in Elk City, Oklahoma in 1996.
