= Elizabeth Adams Rockwell =

Representative from Phoenix, Arizona

Elizabeth Rockwell Adams

Member of Arizona house of representatives
- In office 1965–1989

Personal details
- Born: September 4, 1918
- Died: June 20, 2001
- Party: Republican

Elizabeth "Betty" Adams Rockwell(4th September 1918 - June 20th 2001) was a member of the Arizona house of representatives.

== Early life, family, education ==
Rockwell was born in Phoenix in 1918 and would be raised there.

Rockwell's mother, Margaret Adams Rockwell, was a member of the Republican National Committee and an unsuccessful candidate for the United States House of Representatives. Rockwell's maternal grandfather, J. C. Adams, was the proprietor of the Hotel Adams in Phoenix and served as the city's mayor.

== Arizona House of Representatives (1965–1989) ==
Rockwell served as a member of the Arizona House of Representatives from 1965 to 1989.

== Later life ==
Rockwell died on June 20th 2001.
