= D. Delos Ellsworth =

American politician (1931–2013)

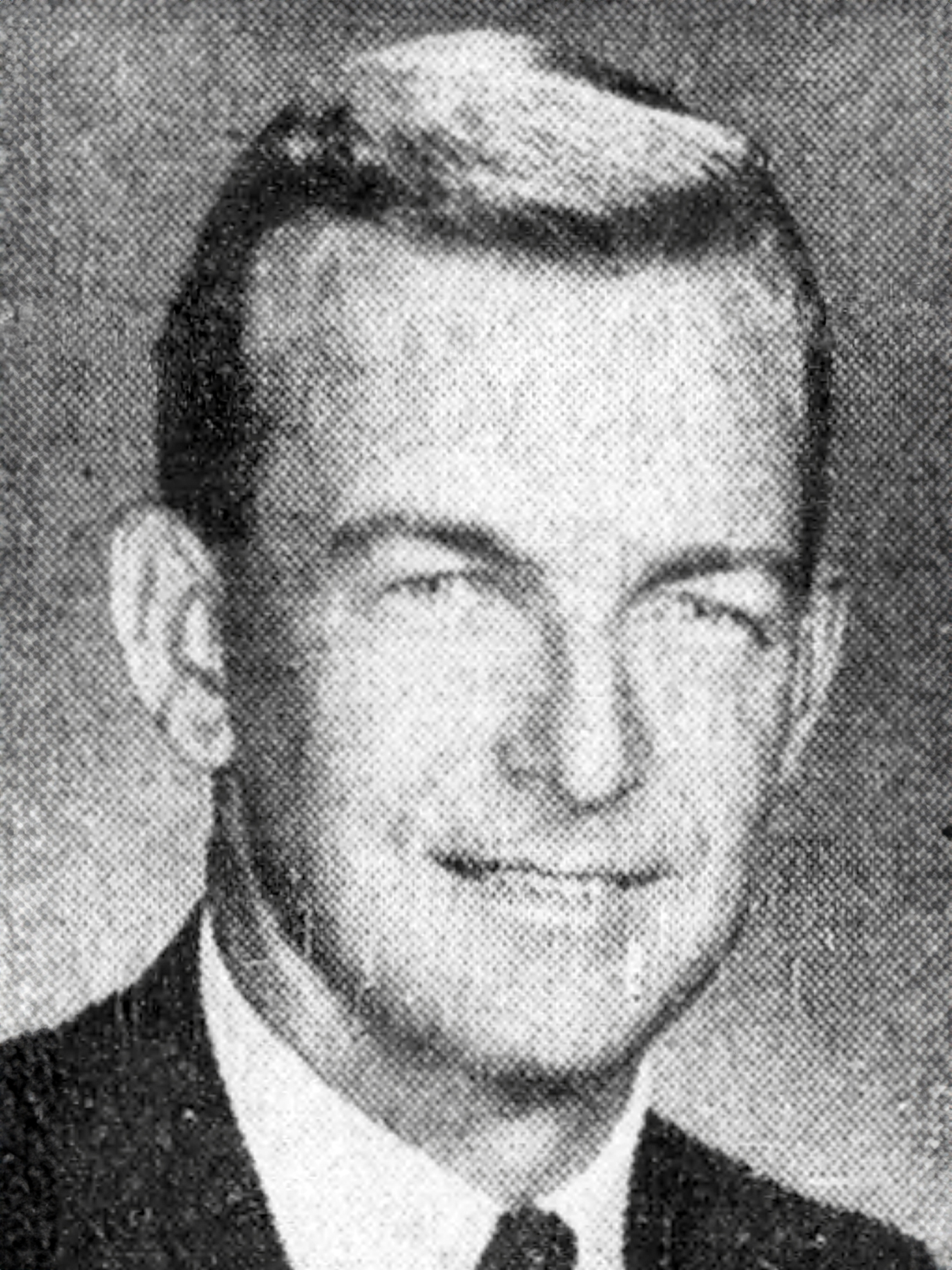
- Ellsworth in 1970

Member of the Arizona House of Representatives
- In office January 1, 1965 – December 31, 1969

Member of the Arizona Senate
- In office January 1, 1971 – December 31, 1975

Personal details
- Born: February 23, 1931 Chandler, Arizona, U.S.
- Died: December 9, 2013 (aged 82) Mesa, Arizona, U.S.
- Party: Republican
- Spouse: Alba
- Children: 6

D. Delos Ellsworth (February 23, 1931 – December 9, 2013) was an American politician. He served as a Republican member of the Arizona House of Representatives and the Arizona Senate.
