= Etta Mae Hutcheson =

American politician from Arizona

Etta Mae "Ma Hutch" Olmstead Hutcheson (August 6, 1892 - February 19, 1991) was an Arizona legislator. Born in New Mexico, she entered the Arizona House of Representatives in 1953, ultimately serving nine terms in office.

== Biography ==
Etta Mae Olmstead was born on August 6, 1892 in Weed, New Mexico. Six weeks later, her family moved by covered wagon to Arizona Territory. She was the daughter of Samuel Baldwin Olmstead Jr., the son of a Democratic politician originally from New York. Etta Mae Olmstead left school after the eighth grade. In 1902, the Olmstead family moved to Tucson, Arizona.

At age 19, she campaigned for George W. P. Hunt, who would become the first governor of Arizona. That year she married her first husband, William "Bill" Dalton. Bill Dalton died in 1915 after falling onto railroad tracks. In 1916, she married her second husband Oril O. Hutcheson, a train conductor. Etta Mae and Oril would later share a son together.

=== Democratic party membership ===
In 1913 at age 21, Etta Mae Dalton joined the Arizona and Pima County Democratic parties. She quickly became active in Democratic causes. She volunteered for the Pima County Welfare Board in the 1920s and 1930s and joined the Arizona State Federation of Democratic Women's Clubs. She additionally was a member of the Order of the Eastern Star, where she assumed further leadership positions. Throughout the 1940s, she was involved in Democratic organizations in Tucson, where she took an active leadership role and served as a ward captain. In 1949, her husband and daughter died. In 1950, Hucheson was elected a delegate from Tucson to the Arizona State Federation of Democratic Women's Clubs.

=== House Appointment ===
On October 20, 1953, the longtime Democratic volunteer was appointed to fill the vacant house seat of Representative Larry Woods in Pima County's district 3. On her appointment, she joined 11 other women serving in the Arizona House of Representatives at the time. During her time in the House of Representatives, she became known by "Ma Hutch" by her peers. She would continue to run for reelection, and was undefeated through nine consecutive electoral cycles. In 1970, alongside her colleague Ethel Maynard, the pair advanced an initiative to develop state-financed kindergarten and to extend the vote to 18-year-olds.

=== Retirement and later life ===
Hucheson retired for medical reasons in 1972. In 1974, she was honored by the Arizona House of Representatives for her 19 years of service and recognized for her role as the first woman to serve as speaker pro tempore of the House, and for her ability to pass legislation.

Etta Mae Hucheson died at her home in Tucson on February 19, 1991 at age 98.
