= Ruth Peck =

American politician

Ruth Peck (December 11, 1901-February 26, 1996) was a state legislator in Arizona. She served in the Arizona House of Representatives from 1959-1976. She was a Republican.

She was born in Denton, Texas. Ruth Thomason married Vernon McKinley Peck.
