= Bob Stump =

American politician (1927–2003)

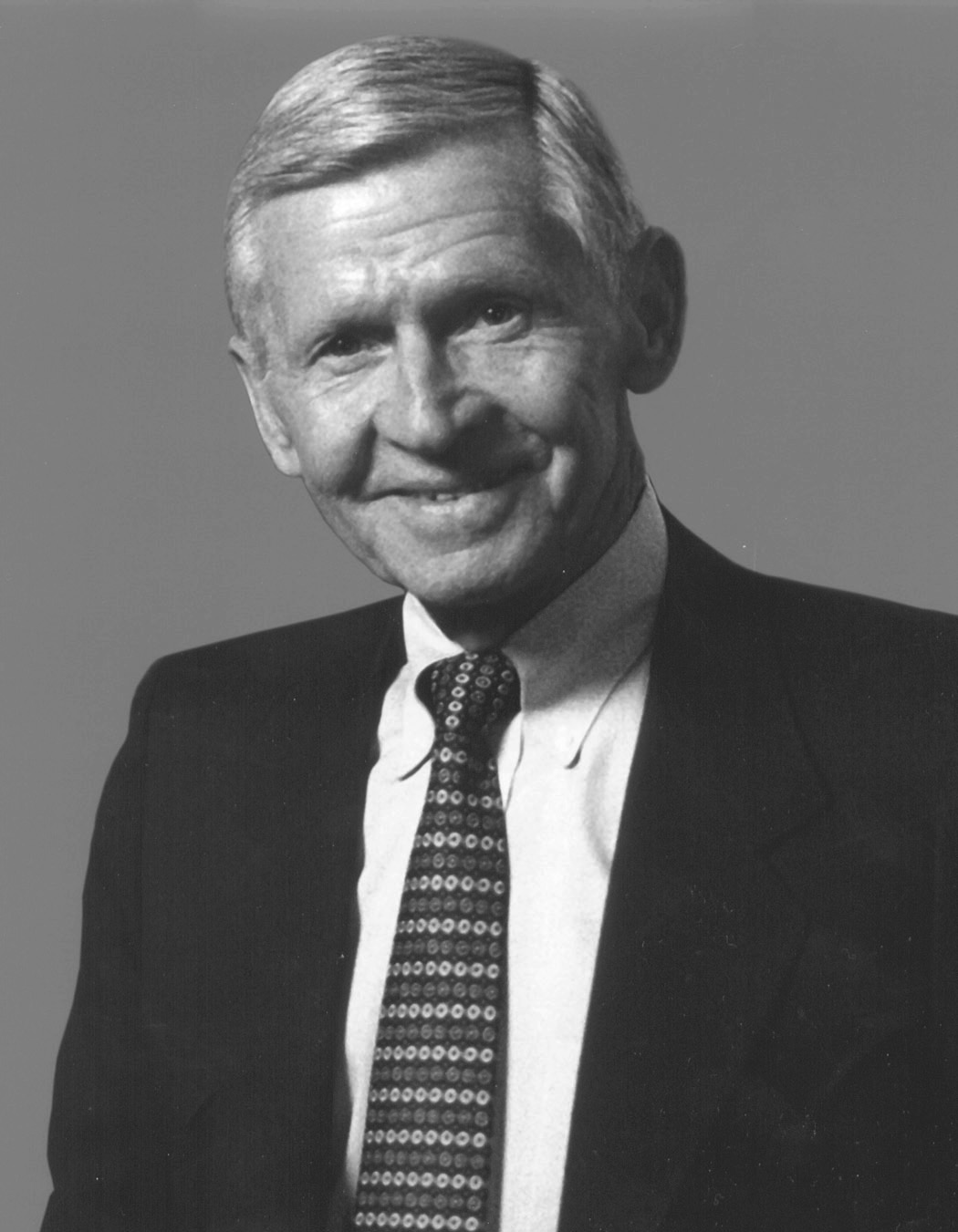

Chair of the House Armed Services Committee
- In office January 4, 2001 – January 3, 2003
- Speaker: Dennis Hastert
- Preceded by: Floyd Spence
- Succeeded by: Duncan Hunter

Chair of the House Veterans' Affairs Committee
- In office January 4, 1995 – January 4, 2001
- Speaker: Newt Gingrich; Dennis Hastert
- Preceded by: Sonny Montgomery
- Succeeded by: Chris Smith

Member of the U.S. House of Representatives from Arizona's 3rd district
- In office January 3, 1977 – January 3, 2003
- Preceded by: Sam Steiger
- Succeeded by: Trent Franks (Redistricting)

Member of the Arizona Senate from the 6th district
- In office January 1, 1973 – December 31, 1976
- Preceded by: E. B. (Blodie) Thode
- Succeeded by: Polly Getzwiller

Member of the Arizona Senate from the 27th district
- In office January 1, 1971 – December 31, 1972
- Preceded by: Constituency established
- Succeeded by: James A. Mack

Member of the Arizona Senate from the 8-N district
- In office January 1, 1967 – December 31, 1970
- Preceded by: Constituency established
- Succeeded by: Constituency abolished

Member of the Arizona House of Representatives from the Maricopa County district
- In office January 1, 1959 – December 31, 1966
- Preceded by: Multi-member district
- Succeeded by: Multi-member district

Personal details
- Born: Robert Lee Stump; April 4, 1927 Phoenix, Arizona, U.S.
- Died: June 20, 2003 (aged 76) Phoenix, Arizona, U.S.
- Resting place: Greenwood Memory Lawn Cemetery (Phoenix, Arizona)
- Party: Democratic (1958–1982); Republican (1982–2003)
- Spouse: Nancy Stump
- Children: 3
- Education: Arizona State University

Military service
- Allegiance: United States of America
- Branch/service: United States Navy
- Years of service: 1943–1946
- Battles/wars: World War II
- Bob Stump's voice Stump, as chair of the House Armed Services Committee, presents the conference report for the FY2002 National Defense Authorization Act; Recorded December 13, 2001

Robert Lee Stump (April 4, 1927 – June 20, 2003) was an American politician who served as a U.S. Congressman from Arizona. He served as a member from the Democratic Party from 1977 to 1983 and then later as a member of the Republican Party until the end of his tenure as congressman.

== Early life and career ==
Stump was born in Phoenix, and was a U.S. Navy World War II combat veteran, where he served on the USS Tulagi from 1943 to 1946. He graduated from Tolleson Union High School in 1947, and Arizona State University in 1951 where he was a member of the Delta Chi fraternity. He owned a cotton and grain farm in the Phoenix suburb of Tolleson for many years.

He served four terms in the Arizona House of Representatives from 1959 to 1967, and five terms in the Arizona State Senate, from 1967 to 1976. He served as President of the Arizona State Senate from 1975 to 1976.

== Member of Congress ==
He was first elected to the 95th Congress on November 2, 1976, originally as a Democrat from the 3rd Congressional District, a vast district stretching from western Phoenix through Prescott to Lake Havasu City and the Grand Canyon. He defeated state senate minority leader Fred Koory with 47 percent of the vote.

Stump wore his party ties very loosely. He considered himself a "Pinto Democrat," the popular name for conservative Democrats from rural Arizona, and his voting record was strongly conservative. His profile was similar to those of conservative Democrats from the South. He voted for Ronald Reagan's tax cuts in 1981. Shortly after that vote, he announced that he would run for re-election as a Republican in 1982. Regardless of his party affiliation, he never faced serious competition at the ballot box. After his initial run for Congress, he only dropped below 60 percent of the vote once, in 1990. He only faced an independent in 1978, and was completely unopposed in 1986.

He briefly considered running for the Senate in 1986 after Barry Goldwater decided to retire.

Described as "quiet" and "assiduously private", Stump kept a fairly low profile for most of his tenure. He had only a skeleton staff; he was known to answer the phone himself at his Washington, D.C. office, and to open his own mail. Stump usually returned home to work his farm in Tolleson on weekends.

Stump voted against the Abandoned Shipwrecks Act of 1987. The Act asserts United States title to certain abandoned shipwrecks located on or embedded in submerged lands under state jurisdiction, and transfers title to the respective state, thereby empowering states to manage these cultural and historical resources more efficiently, with the goal of preventing treasure hunters and salvagers from damaging them. Despite his vote against it, President Ronald Reagan signed it into law on April 28, 1988.

In November 1997, Stump was one of eighteen Republicans in the House to co-sponsor a resolution by Bob Barr that sought to launch an impeachment inquiry against President Bill Clinton. The resolution did not specify any charges or allegations. This was an early effort to impeach Clinton, predating the eruption of the Clinton–Lewinsky scandal. The eruption of that scandal would ultimately lead to a more serious effort to impeach Clinton in 1998. On October 8, 1998, Stump voted in favor of legislation that was passed to open an impeachment inquiry. On December 19, 1998, Stump voted in favor of all four proposed articles of impeachment against Clinton (only two of which received the majority of votes needed to be adopted).

In his 26 years in the House he became a noted member of the House Armed Services Committee, serving as chairman from 2001 to 2003. He'd chaired the House Veterans' Affairs Committee from 1995 to 2001, when he was forced to give that post up due to caucus-imposed term limits. He is one of the few members of the House to chair both committees. He consistently supported increased spending on the military and veterans. The 2003 military appropriations authorization act was named after him in recognition of his commitment to the military as the Bob Stump National Defense Authorization Act for Fiscal Year 2003.

Stump sponsored bills to make English the official language for government business and to alter laws so that children born on US soil to non-citizen parents would not automatically be citizens. According to Amy Silverson, he was "best known in Congress as a perpetual naysayer, casting votes against almost all spending programs."

Between 1976 and 2002, he accumulated a lifetime score of 97 (out of 100) from the American Conservative Union. He received very low scores from the National Council of Senior Citizens, the American Civil Liberties Union, the AFL–CIO, the NAACP, and the League of Conservation Voters.

Although his district included the entire northwestern portion of Arizona, the great majority of its residents lived in the West Valley. Stump was often accused of addressing himself mainly to the West Valley and ignoring the other portions of his sprawling district, even though the district's center of gravity had moved to the West Valley as early as the 1970s. Indeed, many of his constituents rarely saw him. He maintained his district office in downtown Phoenix, outside his own district, for many years. Although he claimed his farm in Tolleson as his residence in the district, his main residence was in another portion of Phoenix outside the district. However, Stump told The Arizona Republic that he saw the farm as "my place of business," and knew that "nobody ever thought I resided there." He believed that "you declare your residency wherever you want. Stump would have been well within his rights to claim his Phoenix home as his official residence, as members of the House are only required to live in the state they represent.

== Bob Hope announcement ==
After the Associated Press mistakenly placed Bob Hope's obituary on its web site in June 1998, Stump announced on the floor of the House that the entertainer had died. This was quickly denied by his daughter and publicist; Hope outlived Stump by five weeks, dying in 2003 at the age of 100.

== Death and legacy ==
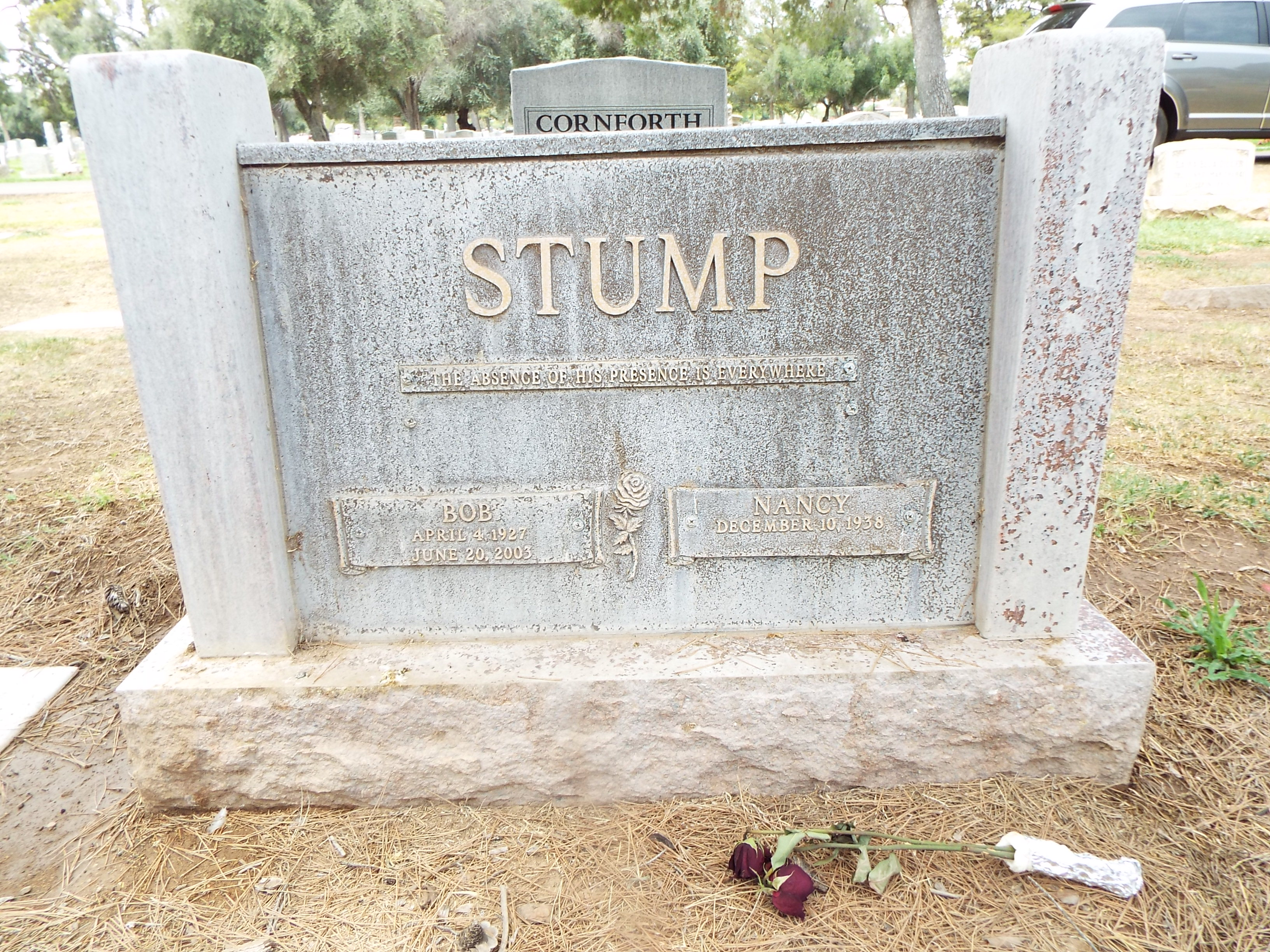
Grave site of Robert Lee Stump and Nancy Stump

He decided not to run for re-election in 2002 due to declining health. He endorsed his longtime chief of staff, Lisa Jackson Atkins, as his successor in what was then numbered as the 2nd District. Atkins had been very visible in the district, to the point that many thought she actually represented it rather than Stump. However, Atkins was defeated in a seven way Republican primary by Trent Franks, who held the seat until December 2017. Stump died June 20, 2003, of myelodysplasia, a blood disorder, and was buried at Greenwood/Memory Lawn Mortuary & Cemetery in Phoenix with full military honors.

In 2004, the Department of Veterans Affairs Medical Center in Prescott, Arizona, was renamed the Bob Stump Department of Veterans Affairs Medical Center. In 2006, SR 303L was renamed the Bob Stump Memorial Parkway.

Stump is no relation to the Arizona Corporation Commission member of the same name. In 2018, Stump's widow issued a letter, criticizing the younger, unrelated Stump for allegedly capitalizing on her late husband's name. The letter was met with a sharp rebuke by the younger Stump's mother.

== See also ==
- List of American politicians who switched parties in office
- List of United States representatives who switched parties

Arizona House of Representatives
Preceded by Multi-member district	Member of the Arizona House of Representatives from the Maricopa County district 1959–1967	Succeeded by Multi-member district
Arizona Senate
Preceded by Constituency established	Member of the Arizona Senate from the 8-N district 1967–1971	Succeeded by Constituency abolished
Preceded by Constituency established	Member of the Arizona Senate from the 27th district 1971–1973	Succeeded by James A. Mack
Preceded by E. B. (Blodie) Thode	Member of the Arizona Senate from the 6th district 1973–1977	Succeeded by Polly Getzwiller
U.S. House of Representatives
Preceded by Sam Steiger	Member of the U.S. House of Representatives from Arizona's 3rd congressional district 1977–2003	Succeeded by John Shadegg
Political offices
Preceded by Gerald Solomon	Ranking Member of the House Veterans' Affairs Committee; 1989–1995	Succeeded by Sonny Montgomery
Preceded by Sonny Montgomery	Chair of the House Veterans' Affairs Committee; 1995–2001	Succeeded by Chris Smith
Preceded by Floyd Spence	Chair of the House Armed Services Committee; 2001–2003	Succeeded by Duncan L. Hunter
