= List of Arizona state legislatures =

The legislature of the U.S. state of Arizona has convened many times since statehood became effective on February 14, 1912. It continues to operate under the amended Constitution of Arizona of 1912.

== Territorial legislatures, 1864-1909 ==
Name	Start date	End date
1st Arizona Territorial Legislature	September 26, 1864	1864
2nd Arizona Territorial Legislature	December 6, 1865	
3rd Arizona Territorial Legislature	October 3, 1866	November 6, 1866
4th Arizona Territorial Legislature	September 4, 1867	October 7, 1867
5th Arizona Territorial Legislature	November 10, 1868	December 16, 1868
6th Arizona Territorial Legislature	January 11, 1871	February 14, 1871
7th Arizona Territorial Legislature	January 6, 1873	
8th Arizona Territorial Legislature	January 4, 1875	February 12, 1875
9th Arizona Territorial Legislature	January 1, 1877	
10th Arizona Territorial Legislature	January 6, 1879	
11th Arizona Territorial Legislature	January 3, 1881	
12th Arizona Territorial Legislature	January 8, 1883	
13th Arizona Territorial Legislature	January 12, 1885	
14th Arizona Territorial Legislature	January 10, 1887	March 10, 1887
15th Arizona Territorial Legislature	January 21, 1889	April 11, 1889
16th Arizona Territorial Legislature	January 19, 1891	
17th Arizona Territorial Legislature	February 13, 1893	April 13, 1893
18th Arizona Territorial Legislature	January 21, 1895	March 21, 1895
19th Arizona Territorial Legislature	January 18, 1897	March 18, 1897
20th Arizona Territorial Legislature	January 16, 1899	March 16, 1899
21st Arizona Territorial Legislature	January 21, 1901	March 21, 1901
22nd Arizona Territorial Legislature	January 19, 1903	March 19, 1903
23rd Arizona Territorial Legislature	January 16, 1905	March 16, 1905
24th Arizona Territorial Legislature	January 21, 1907	March 21, 1907
25th Arizona Territorial Legislature	January 18, 1909	March 18, 1909

== State legislatures, 1912-present ==
Name	Start date	End date	Last election
1st Arizona State Legislature	March 18, 1912	December 31, 1914	December 12, 1911
2nd Arizona State Legislature	January 1, 1915	December 31, 1916	
3rd Arizona State Legislature	January 1, 1917	December 31, 1918	
4th Arizona State Legislature	January 1, 1919	December 31, 1920	
5th Arizona State Legislature	January 1, 1921	December 31, 1922	
6th Arizona State Legislature	January 1, 1923	December 31, 1924	
7th Arizona State Legislature	January 1, 1925	December 31, 1926	
8th Arizona State Legislature	January 1, 1927	December 31, 1928	
9th Arizona State Legislature	January 1, 1929	December 31, 1930	
10th Arizona State Legislature	January 1, 1931	December 31, 1932	
11th Arizona State Legislature	January 1, 1933	December 31, 1934	
12th Arizona State Legislature	January 1, 1935	December 31, 1936	
13th Arizona State Legislature	January 1, 1937	December 31, 1938	
14th Arizona State Legislature	January 1, 1939	December 31, 1940	
15th Arizona State Legislature	January 1, 1941	December 31, 1942	
16th Arizona State Legislature	January 1, 1943	December 31, 1944	
17th Arizona State Legislature	January 1, 1945	December 31, 1946	
18th Arizona State Legislature	January 1, 1947	December 31, 1948	
19th Arizona State Legislature	January 1, 1949	December 31, 1950	
20th Arizona State Legislature	January 1, 1951	December 31, 1952	
21st Arizona State Legislature	January 1, 1953	December 31, 1954	
22nd Arizona State Legislature	January 1, 1955	December 31, 1956	
23rd Arizona State Legislature	January 1, 1957	December 31, 1958	November 1956: House, Senate
24th Arizona State Legislature	January 1, 1959	December 31, 1960	November 1958: House, Senate
25th Arizona State Legislature	January 1, 1961	December 31, 1962	November 1960: House, Senate
26th Arizona State Legislature	January 1, 1963	December 31, 1964	November 1962: House, Senate
27th Arizona State Legislature	January 1, 1965	December 31, 1966	November 1964: House, Senate
28th Arizona State Legislature	January 1, 1967	December 31, 1968	November 1966: House, Senate
29th Arizona State Legislature	January 1, 1969	December 31, 1970	November 1968: House, Senate
30th Arizona State Legislature	January 1, 1971	December 31, 1972	November 1970: House, Senate
31st Arizona State Legislature	January 1, 1973	December 31, 1974	November 1972: House, Senate
32nd Arizona State Legislature	January 1, 1975	December 31, 1976	November 1974: House, Senate
33rd Arizona State Legislature	January 1, 1977	December 31, 1978	November 1976: House, Senate
34th Arizona State Legislature	January 1, 1979	December 31, 1980	November 1978: House, Senate
35th Arizona State Legislature	January 1, 1981	December 31, 1982	November 1980: House, Senate
36th Arizona State Legislature	January 1, 1983	December 31, 1984	November 1982: House, Senate
37th Arizona State Legislature	January 1, 1985	December 31, 1986	November 1984: House, Senate
38th Arizona State Legislature	January 1, 1987	December 31, 1988	November 1986: House, Senate
39th Arizona State Legislature	January 1, 1989	December 31, 1990	November 1988: House, Senate
40th Arizona State Legislature	January 1, 1991	December 31, 1992	November 1990: House, Senate
41st Arizona State Legislature	January 1, 1993	December 31, 1994	November 1992: House, Senate
42nd Arizona State Legislature	January 1, 1995	December 31, 1996	November 1994: House, Senate
43rd Arizona State Legislature	January 1, 1997	December 31, 1998	November 1996: House, Senate
44th Arizona State Legislature	January 1, 1999	December 31, 2000	November 1998: House, Senate
45th Arizona State Legislature	January 1, 2001	December 31, 2002	November 2000: House, Senate
46th Arizona State Legislature	January 1, 2003	December 31, 2004	November 2002: House, Senate
47th Arizona State Legislature	January 1, 2005	December 31, 2006	November 2004: House, Senate
48th Arizona State Legislature	January 1, 2007	December 31, 2008	2006 Arizona Legislature election
49th Arizona State Legislature	January 1, 2009	December 31, 2010	November 2008: House, Senate
50th Arizona State Legislature	January 1, 2011	December 31, 2012	November 2010: Senate
51st Arizona State Legislature	January 1, 2013	December 31, 2014	November 2012
52nd Arizona State Legislature	January 1, 2015	December 31, 2016	November 2014: Senate
53rd Arizona State Legislature	January 1, 2017	December 31, 2018	November 2016: Senate
54th Arizona State Legislature	January 1, 2019	December 31, 2020	November 2018
55th Arizona State Legislature	January 1, 2021	December 31, 2022	November 2020: House, Senate
56th Arizona State Legislature	January 1, 2023	December 31, 2024	November 8, 2022: House, Senate
57th Arizona State Legislature	January 1, 2025	December 31, 2026	November 5, 2024: House, Senate

== See also ==
- List of speakers of the Arizona House of Representatives
- List of governors of Arizona
- Politics of Arizona
- Elections in Arizona
- Arizona State Capitol
- Timeline of Arizona
- Lists of United States state legislative sessions
