= 1960 Arizona House of Representatives election =

1960 Arizona House of Representatives elections
- November 8, 1960

All 80 seats in the Arizona House 41 seats needed for a majority
	Majority party	Minority party
Party	Democratic	Republican
Last election	55	25
Seats after	52	28
Seat change	▼3	▲3
Speaker before election
W. L. "Tay" Cook
Democrat
Elected Speaker
W. L. "Tay" Cook
Democrat

The 1960 Arizona House of Representatives elections were held on November 8, 1960. Voters elected members of the Arizona House of Representatives in all 80 of the state's House districts to serve a two-year term. The elections coincided with the elections for other offices, including Governor, U.S. House, and State Senate. Primary elections were held on September 13, 1960.

Prior to the elections, the Democrats held a majority of 55 seats over the Republicans' 25 seats.

Following the elections, Democrats maintained control of the chamber with 52 Democrats to 28 Republicans, a net gain of three seats for Republicans.

The newly elected members served in the 25th Arizona State Legislature, during which Democrat W. L. "Tay" Cook was chosen as Speaker of the Arizona House. (Note: Cook was elected as Speaker for the 25th legislature, defeating Representative Rhodes, who was also nominated for Speaker. The vote tally for Speaker was: Cook-43 votes; Rhodes-36 votes; and one absent (Robert L. Myers).)

== Summary of Results ==
County	Subdistrict	Incumbent	Party	Elected Representative	Outcome
Apache	Apache-1	James S. Shreeve	Dem	James S. Shreeve	Dem Hold
Cochise	Cochise-1	Clyde M. Dalton	Dem	Clyde M. Dalton	Dem Hold
Cochise	Cochise-2	A. J. (Jack) Gilbert	Dem	A. J. (Jack) Gilbert	Dem Hold
Cochise	Cochise-3	Charles O. Bloomquist	Dem	James A. (Jim) Elliott	Dem Hold
Cochise	Cochise-4	W. L. "Tay" Cook	Dem	W. L. "Tay" Cook	Dem Hold
Coconino	Coconino-1	Thomas M. (Tommy) Knoles Jr.	Dem	Thomas M. (Tommy) Knoles Jr.	Dem Hold
Coconino	Coconino-2	Harold J. Scudder	Dem	Harold J. Scudder	Dem Hold
Gila	Gila-1	R. E. "Arky" Burnham	Dem	Louis B. Ellsworth Jr.	Dem Hold
Gila	Gila-2	Nelson D. Brayton	Dem	Nelson D. Brayton	Dem Hold
Gila	Gila-3	Edwynne C. (Polly) Rosenbaum	Dem	Edwynne C. (Polly) Rosenbaum	Dem Hold
Graham	Graham-1	E. L. Tidwell	Dem	Gordon L. Hoopes	Dem Hold
Graham	Graham-2	Milton Lines	Dem	Milton Lines	Dem Hold
Greenlee	Greenlee-1	Tom W. Berry	Dem	Tom W. Berry	Dem Hold
Greenlee	Greenlee-2	G. O. (Sonny) Biles	Dem	G. O. (Sonny) Biles	Dem Hold
Maricopa	Maricopa-1	Marshall Humphrey	Rep	Marshall Humphrey	Rep Hold
Maricopa	Maricopa-2	William S. Porter	Rep	William S. Porter	Rep Hold
Maricopa	Maricopa-3	L. Waldo DeWitt	Rep	L. Waldo DeWitt	Rep Hold
Maricopa	Maricopa-4	J. O. Grimes	Dem	L. Alton Riggs	Dem Hold
Maricopa	Maricopa-5	Elmer King	Dem	Elmer King	Dem Hold
Maricopa	Maricopa-6	Carl Austin	Dem	Carl Austin	Dem Hold
Maricopa	Maricopa-7	Bob Stump	Dem	Bob Stump	Dem Hold
Maricopa	Maricopa-8	Carl Sims, Sr.	Dem	Gilbert Gray	Dem Hold
Maricopa	Maricopa-9	Sidney Kartus	Dem	J. D. Holmes	Dem Hold
Maricopa	Maricopa-10	Martin P. Toscano	Dem	Martin P. Toscano	Dem Hold
Maricopa	Maricopa-11	Frank Bowman	Dem	David B. Kret	Rep Gain
Maricopa	Maricopa-12	Sherman R. Dent	Dem	Ralph W. Koch	Rep Gain
Maricopa	Maricopa-13	Conrad James Carreon	Dem	Conrad James Carreon	Dem Hold
Maricopa	Maricopa-14	Marie S. Earl	Dem	Archie C. Ryan	Dem Hold
Maricopa	Maricopa-15	Geraldine F. (Gerry) Eliot	Rep	Geraldine F. (Gerry) Eliot	Rep Hold
Maricopa	Maricopa-16	Jack E. Gardner	Dem	Robert H. Hutto	Dem Hold
Maricopa	Maricopa-17	S. Earl Pugh	Dem	S. Earl Pugh	Dem Hold
Maricopa	Maricopa-18	Robert L. Myers	Rep	Robert L. Myers	Rep Hold
Maricopa	Maricopa-19	Emogene Jennings	Rep	Robert C. Wilcox	Rep Hold
Maricopa	Maricopa-20	W.F. Vipperman	Dem	W.F. Vipperman	Dem Hold
Maricopa	Maricopa-21	Don Reese	Rep	Don Reese	Rep Hold
Maricopa	Maricopa-22	Elmer T. Burson	Rep	Elmer T. Burson	Rep Hold
Maricopa	Maricopa-23	W. I. Lowry	Rep	F. A. Crane	Dem Gain
Maricopa	Maricopa-24	Ruth Peck	Rep	Ruth Peck	Rep Hold
Maricopa	Maricopa-25	Chet Goldberg Jr.	Rep	George W. Eubank	Rep Hold
Maricopa	Maricopa-26	Robert Brewer	Rep	Robert Brewer	Rep Hold
Maricopa	Maricopa-27	Charles H. Oatman	Dem	George W. Peck	Dem Hold
Maricopa	Maricopa-28	Bill Stephens	Dem	Bill Stephens	Dem Hold
Maricopa	Maricopa-29	Priscilla H. Hays	Rep	Priscilla H. Hays	Rep Hold
Maricopa	Maricopa-30	F. A. Higgins	Rep	F. A. Higgins	Rep Hold
Maricopa	Maricopa-31	David H. Campbell	Rep	Isabel Burgess	Rep Hold
Maricopa	Maricopa-32	Arthur B. Schellenberg	Rep	Arthur B. Schellenberg	Rep Hold
Maricopa	Maricopa-33	Merle E. Hays	Dem	Merle E. Hays	Dem Hold
Maricopa	Maricopa-34	Gene B. McClellan	Rep	Gene B. McClellan	Rep Hold
Maricopa	Maricopa-35	W. B. Barkley	Dem	W. B. Barkley	Dem Hold
Maricopa	Maricopa-36	Lewis B. Bramkamp	Dem	John Wood	Rep Gain
Maricopa	Maricopa-37	T. C. Rhodes	Dem	T. C. Rhodes	Dem Hold
Mohave	Mohave-1	J. J. Glancy	Dem	J. J. Glancy	Dem Hold
Navajo	Navajo-1	Augusta T. Larson	Rep	Augusta T. Larson	Rep Hold
Navajo	Navajo-2	Lee F. Dover	Dem	Lee F. Dover	Dem Hold
Pima	Pima-1	Emmett S. (Bud) Walker	Dem	Emmett S. (Bud) Walker	Dem Hold
Pima	Pima-2	Arnold Elias	Dem	Arnold Elias	Dem Hold
Pima	Pima-3	Etta Mae Hutcheson	Dem	Etta Mae Hutcheson	Dem Hold
Pima	Pima-4	James L. Kennedy	Dem	W. M. (Bill) Carson	Dem Hold
Pima	Pima-5	Dr. Thomas D. Fridena	Dem	Dr. Thomas D. Fridena	Dem Hold
Pima	Pima-6	Douglas S. Holsclaw	Rep	Douglas S. Holsclaw	Rep Hold
Pima	Pima-7	David G. Hawkins	Rep	Doris Russell Varn	Rep Hold
Pima	Pima-8	V. S. "John" Hostetter	Rep	David G. Hawkins	Rep Hold
Pima	Pima-9	William Minor	Dem	John C. (Jack) Jordan	Dem Hold
Pima	Pima-10	Alvin Wessler	Rep	Alvin Wessler	Rep Hold
Pima	Pima-11	Ray Martin	Dem	Ray Martin	Dem Hold
Pima	Pima-12	John H. Haugh	Rep	John H. Haugh	Rep Hold
Pima	Pima-13	Thomas C. Webster	Rep	Thomas C. Webster	Rep Hold
Pima	Pima-14	Emilio Carrillo	Dem	Joe D. Ybarra	Dem Hold
Pima	Pima-15	W. G. "Bill" Bodell	Rep	Nick Traficanti	Rep Hold
Pima	Pima-16	Harold L. Cook	Dem	Harold L. Cook	Dem Hold
Pinal	Pinal-1	Charles Moody	Dem	Charles Moody	Dem Hold
Pinal	Pinal-2	Frederick S. Smith	Dem	Frederick S. Smith	Dem Hold
Pinal	Pinal-3	E. B. Thode	Dem	E. B. Thode	Dem Hold
Santa Cruz	Santa Cruz-1	Robert R. (Bob) Hathaway	Dem	Robert R. (Bob) Hathaway	Dem Hold
Yavapai	Yavapai-1	Mabel S. Ellis	Dem	Mabel S. Ellis	Dem Hold
Yavapai	Yavapai-2	Joseph (Joe) L. Allen	Dem	Raymond Rowland	Rep Gain
Yavapai	Yavapai-3	Milton O. "Mo" Lindner	Dem	Milton O. "Mo" Lindner	Dem Hold
Yuma	Yuma-1	Cecil D. Miller	Dem	Cecil D. Miller	Dem Hold
Yuma	Yuma-2	Robert L. (Bob) Klauer	Dem	Robert L. (Bob) Klauer	Dem Hold
Yuma	Yuma-3	Clara Osborne Botzum	Dem	Clara Osborne Botzum	Dem Hold

== Detailed Results ==
=== Apache-1 ===
General election results
Party	Candidate	Votes	%
Democratic	James S. Shreeve (incumbent)	1,616	54.65%
Republican	Richard G. Udall	1,341	45.35%
Total votes		2,957	100.00%
Democratic hold			

=== Cochise-1 ===
General election results
Party	Candidate	Votes	%
Democratic	Clyde M. Dalton (incumbent)	2,790	59.42%
Republican	Edna Landin	1,905	40.58%
Total votes		4,695	100.00%
Democratic hold			

=== Cochise-2 ===
General election results
Party	Candidate	Votes	%
Democratic	A. J. (Jack) Gilbert (incumbent)	3,162	100.00%
Total votes		3,162	100.00%
Democratic hold			

=== Cochise-3 ===
General election results
Party	Candidate	Votes	%
Democratic	James A. (Jim) Elliott	2,084	100.00%
Total votes		2,084	100.00%
Democratic hold			

=== Cochise-4 ===
General election results
Party	Candidate	Votes	%
Democratic	W. L. "Tay" Cook (incumbent)	2,395	100.00%
Total votes		2,395	100.00%
Democratic hold			

=== Coconino-1 ===
General election results
Party	Candidate	Votes	%
Democratic	Thomas M. (Tommy) Knoles Jr. (incumbent)	3,822	100.00%
Total votes		3,822	100.00%
Democratic hold			

=== Coconino-2 ===
General election results
Party	Candidate	Votes	%
Democratic	Harold J. Scudder (incumbent)	2,508	100.00%
Total votes		2,508	100.00%
Democratic hold			

=== Gila-1 ===
General election results
Party	Candidate	Votes	%
Democratic	Louis B. Ellsworth Jr.	2,052	100.00%
Total votes		2,052	100.00%
Democratic hold			

=== Gila-2 ===
General election results
Party	Candidate	Votes	%
Democratic	Nelson D. Brayton (incumbent)	1,598	100.00%
Total votes		1,598	100.00%
Democratic hold			

=== Gila-3 ===
General election results
Party	Candidate	Votes	%
Democratic	Edwynne C. (Polly) Rosenbaum (incumbent)	3,314	100.00%
Total votes		3,314	100.00%
Democratic hold			

=== Graham-1 ===
General election results
Party	Candidate	Votes	%
Democratic	Gordon L. Hoopes	2,397	100.00%
Total votes		2,397	100.00%
Democratic hold			

=== Graham-2 ===
General election results
Party	Candidate	Votes	%
Democratic	Milton Lines (incumbent)	923	100.00%
Total votes		923	100.00%
Democratic hold			

=== Greenlee-1 ===
General election results
Party	Candidate	Votes	%
Democratic	Tom W. Berry (incumbent)	1,766	100.00%
Total votes		1,766	100.00%
Democratic hold			

=== Greenlee-2 ===
General election results
Party	Candidate	Votes	%
Democratic	G. O. (Sonny) Biles (incumbent)	2,043	100.00%
Total votes		2,043	100.00%
Democratic hold			

=== Maricopa-1 ===
General election results
Party	Candidate	Votes	%
Republican	Marshall Humphrey (incumbent)	3,225	54.46%
Democratic	John R. Carney	2,697	45.54%
Total votes		5,922	100.00%
Republican hold			

=== Maricopa-2 ===
General election results
Party	Candidate	Votes	%
Republican	William S. Porter (incumbent)	4,251	65.92%
Democratic	Charles Rogers	2,198	34.08%
Total votes		6,449	100.00%
Republican hold			

=== Maricopa-3 ===
General election results
Party	Candidate	Votes	%
Republican	L. Waldo DeWitt (incumbent)	3,022	55.04%
Democratic	Frank J. Popello	2,469	44.96%
Total votes		5,491	100.00%
Republican hold			

=== Maricopa-4 ===
General election results
Party	Candidate	Votes	%
Democratic	L. Alton Riggs	3,146	54.45%
Republican	Jim Holley	2,632	45.55%
Total votes		5,778	100.00%
Democratic hold			

=== Maricopa-5 ===
General election results
Party	Candidate	Votes	%
Democratic	Elmer King (incumbent)	3,454	59.33%
Republican	Paul E. Carney	2,368	40.67%
Total votes		5,822	100.00%
Democratic hold			

=== Maricopa-6 ===
General election results
Party	Candidate	Votes	%
Democratic	Carl Austin (incumbent)	3,153	64.28%
Republican	Anthony J. LaSalvia	1,752	35.72%
Total votes		4,905	100.00%
Democratic hold			

=== Maricopa-7 ===
General election results
Party	Candidate	Votes	%
Democratic	Bob Stump (incumbent)	3,027	69.19%
Republican	Mort Brayer	1,348	30.81%
Total votes		4,375	100.00%
Democratic hold			

=== Maricopa-8 ===
General election results
Party	Candidate	Votes	%
Democratic	Gilbert Gray	2,938	79.34%
Republican	Nellye Maye Taylor	765	20.66%
Total votes		3,703	100.00%
Democratic hold			

=== Maricopa-9 ===
General election results
Party	Candidate	Votes	%
Democratic	J. D. Holmes	3,189	85.20%
Republican	Mayo A. Powell	554	14.80%
Total votes		3,743	100.00%
Democratic hold			

=== Maricopa-10 ===
General election results
Party	Candidate	Votes	%
Democratic	Martin P. Toscano (incumbent)	2,779	64.12%
Republican	Nan Douglass	1,555	35.88%
Total votes		4,334	100.00%
Democratic hold			

=== Maricopa-11 ===
General election results
Party	Candidate	Votes	%
Republican	David B. Kret	5,808	56.14%
Democratic	Frank Bowman (incumbent)	4,538	43.86%
Total votes		10,346	100.00%
Republican gain from Democratic			

=== Maricopa-12 ===
General election results
Party	Candidate	Votes	%
Republican	Ralph W. Koch	2,333	52.58%
Democratic	Sherman R. Dent (incumbent)	2,104	47.42%
Total votes		4,437	100.00%
Republican gain from Democratic			

=== Maricopa-13 ===
General election results
Party	Candidate	Votes	%
Democratic	Conrad James Carreon (incumbent)	1,971	58.98%
Republican	W. E. Reed	1,371	41.02%
Total votes		3,342	100.00%
Democratic hold			

=== Maricopa-14 ===
General election results
Party	Candidate	Votes	%
Democratic	Archie C. Ryan	2,217	100.00%
Total votes		2,217	100.00%
Democratic hold			

=== Maricopa-15 ===
General election results
Party	Candidate	Votes	%
Republican	Gerry Eliot (incumbent)	2,042	52.75%
Democratic	J. R. Johnson	1,829	47.25%
Total votes		3,871	100.00%
Republican hold			

=== Maricopa-16 ===
General election results
Party	Candidate	Votes	%
Democratic	Robert H. Hutto	2,512	63.39%
Republican	William A. Herron	1,451	36.61%
Total votes		3,963	100.00%
Democratic hold			

=== Maricopa-17 ===
General election results
Party	Candidate	Votes	%
Democratic	S. Earl Pugh (incumbent)	6,865	56.70%
Republican	John S. Buford	5,243	43.30%
Total votes		12,108	100.00%
Democratic hold			

=== Maricopa-18 ===
General election results
Party	Candidate	Votes	%
Republican	Robert L. Myers (incumbent)	2,568	62.63%
Democratic	Lawrence J. Fleming	1,532	37.37%
Total votes		4,100	100.00%
Republican hold			

=== Maricopa-19 ===
General election results
Party	Candidate	Votes	%
Republican	Robert C. Wilcox	2,464	62.40%
Democratic	Cleo Lee	1,485	37.60%
Total votes		3,949	100.00%
Republican hold			

=== Maricopa-20 ===
General election results
Party	Candidate	Votes	%
Democratic	W.F. Vipperman (incumbent)	2,122	52.89%
Republican	Chesley A. Northrop	1,890	47.11%
Total votes		4,012	100.00%
Democratic hold			

=== Maricopa-21 ===
General election results
Party	Candidate	Votes	%
Republican	Don Reese (incumbent)	7,561	70.80%
Democratic	Frank Anderson	3,119	29.20%
Total votes		10,680	100.00%
Republican hold			

=== Maricopa-22 ===
General election results
Party	Candidate	Votes	%
Republican	Elmer T. Burson (incumbent)	3,091	60.87%
Democratic	Art Hargrave	1,987	39.13%
Total votes		5,078	100.00%
Republican hold			

=== Maricopa-23 ===
General election results
Party	Candidate	Votes	%
Democratic	F. A. Crane	2,385	55.62%
Republican	W. I. Lowry (incumbent)	1,903	44.38%
Total votes		4,288	100.00%
Democratic gain from Republican			

=== Maricopa-24 ===
General election results
Party	Candidate	Votes	%
Republican	Ruth Peck (incumbent)	2,639	58.51%
Democratic	Ted Mote	1,871	41.49%
Total votes		4,510	100.00%
Republican hold			

=== Maricopa-25 ===
General election results
Party	Candidate	Votes	%
Republican	George W. Eubank	2,566	58.03%
Democratic	Newton Frishberg	1,856	41.97%
Total votes		4,422	100.00%
Republican hold			

=== Maricopa-26 ===
General election results
Party	Candidate	Votes	%
Republican	Robert Brewer (incumbent)	2,438	57.10%
Democratic	M. Frances Adams	1,832	42.90%
Total votes		4,270	100.00%
Republican hold			

=== Maricopa-27 ===
General election results
Party	Candidate	Votes	%
Democratic	George W. Peck	2,622	58.54%
Republican	R. H. Scholtz	1,857	41.46%
Total votes		4,479	100.00%
Democratic hold			

=== Maricopa-28 ===
General election results
Party	Candidate	Votes	%
Democratic	Bill Stephens (incumbent)	4,533	51.48%
Republican	Richard A. Steiner	4,273	48.52%
Total votes		8,806	100.00%
Democratic hold			

=== Maricopa-29 ===
General election results
Party	Candidate	Votes	%
Republican	Priscilla H. Hays (incumbent)	2,381	54.03%
Democratic	Richard Kamps	2,026	45.97%
Total votes		4,407	100.00%
Republican hold			

=== Maricopa-30 ===
General election results
Party	Candidate	Votes	%
Republican	F. A. Higgins (incumbent)	2,868	63.16%
Democratic	Monica C. Hayes	1,673	36.84%
Total votes		4,541	100.00%
Republican hold			

=== Maricopa-31 ===
General election results
Party	Candidate	Votes	%
Republican	Isabel Burgess	4,174	64.69%
Democratic	Mary Eloise Reynolds	2,278	35.31%
Total votes		6,452	100.00%
Republican hold			

=== Maricopa-32 ===
General election results
Party	Candidate	Votes	%
Republican	Arthur B. Schellenberg (incumbent)	3,420	74.30%
Democratic	Tom Roof	1,183	25.70%
Total votes		4,603	100.00%
Republican hold			

=== Maricopa-33 ===
General election results
Party	Candidate	Votes	%
Democratic	Merle E. Hays (incumbent)	3,966	53.97%
Republican	C.H. Moritz	3,383	46.03%
Total votes		7,349	100.00%
Democratic hold			

=== Maricopa-34 ===
General election results
Party	Candidate	Votes	%
Republican	Gene B. McClellan (incumbent)	4,388	56.86%
Democratic	E. G. Sauer	3,329	43.14%
Total votes		7,717	100.00%
Republican hold			

=== Maricopa-35 ===
General election results
Party	Candidate	Votes	%
Democratic	W. B. Barkley (incumbent)	3,375	56.33%
Republican	Robert D. Lundberg	2,617	43.67%
Total votes		5,992	100.00%
Democratic hold			

=== Maricopa-36 ===
General election results
Party	Candidate	Votes	%
Republican	John Wood	3,288	50.43%
Democratic	Lewis B. Bramkamp (incumbent)	3,129	47.99%
Independent	Arnold Opengart	103	1.58%
Total votes		6,520	100.00%
Republican gain from Democratic			

=== Maricopa-37 ===
General election results
Party	Candidate	Votes	%
Democratic	T. C. Rhodes (incumbent)	3,042	62.26%
Republican	M. B. Shears	1,844	37.74%
Total votes		4,886	100.00%
Democratic hold			

=== Mohave-1 ===
General election results
Party	Candidate	Votes	%
Democratic	J. J. Glancy (incumbent)	2,190	100.00%
Total votes		2,190	100.00%
Democratic hold			

=== Navajo-1 ===
General election results
Party	Candidate	Votes	%
Republican	Augusta T. Larson (incumbent)	2,323	58.25%
Democratic	Mary Lou Loveland	1,665	41.75%
Total votes		3,988	100.00%
Republican hold			

=== Navajo-2 ===
General election results
Party	Candidate	Votes	%
Democratic	Lee F. Dover (incumbent)	2,418	100.00%
Total votes		2,418	100.00%
Democratic hold			

=== Pima-1 ===
General election results
Party	Candidate	Votes	%
Democratic	E. S. (Bud) Walker (incumbent)	1,647	65.77%
Republican	Malin W. Lewis	857	34.23%
Total votes		2,504	100.00%
Democratic hold			

=== Pima-2 ===
General election results
Party	Candidate	Votes	%
Democratic	Arnold Elias (incumbent)	4,853	57.20%
Republican	Ralph Curtis	3,631	42.80%
Total votes		8,484	100.00%
Democratic hold			

=== Pima-3 ===
General election results
Party	Candidate	Votes	%
Democratic	Etta Mae Hutcheson (incumbent)	1,277	100.00%
Total votes		1,277	100.00%
Democratic hold			

=== Pima-4 ===
General election results
Party	Candidate	Votes	%
Democratic	W. M. (Bill) Carson	4,457	100.00%
Total votes		4,457	100.00%
Democratic hold			

=== Pima-5 ===
General election results
Party	Candidate	Votes	%
Democratic	Dr. Thomas D. Fridena (incumbent)	1,290	100.00%
Total votes		1,290	100.00%
Democratic hold			

=== Pima-6 ===
General election results
Party	Candidate	Votes	%
Republican	Douglas S. Holsclaw (incumbent)	1,645	100.00%
Total votes		1,645	100.00%
Republican hold			

=== Pima-7 ===
General election results
Party	Candidate	Votes	%
Republican	Doris Russell Varn	2,319	58.63%
Democratic	Russ Andalaro	1,636	41.37%
Total votes		3,955	100.00%
Republican hold			

=== Pima-8 ===
General election results
Party	Candidate	Votes	%
Republican	David G. Hawkins (incumbent) (Note: Redistricted from Pima-7 to Pima-8.)	2,273	57.78%
Democratic	James N. (Jimmy) Corbett Jr.	1,661	42.22%
Total votes		3,934	100.00%
Republican hold			

=== Pima-9 ===
General election results
Party	Candidate	Votes	%
Democratic	John C. (Jack) Jordan	3,095	54.80%
Republican	Harry Badet	2,553	45.20%
Total votes		5,648	100.00%
Democratic hold			

=== Pima-10 ===
General election results
Party	Candidate	Votes	%
Republican	Alvin Wessler (incumbent)	4,646	53.70%
Democratic	Ray C. Brown	4,006	46.30%
Total votes		8,652	100.00%
Republican hold			

=== Pima-11 ===
General election results
Party	Candidate	Votes	%
Democratic	Ray Martin (incumbent)	5,043	55.34%
Republican	James B. Meigs Jr.	4,070	44.66%
Total votes		9,113	100.00%
Democratic hold			

=== Pima-12 ===
General election results
Party	Candidate	Votes	%
Republican	John H. Haugh (incumbent)	3,585	65.13%
Democratic	Robert M. Pagel	1,919	34.87%
Total votes		5,504	100.00%
Republican hold			

=== Pima-13 ===
General election results
Party	Candidate	Votes	%
Republican	Thomas C. Webster (incumbent)	5,003	52.86%
Democratic	Earl H. Upham	4,461	47.14%
Total votes		9,464	100.00%
Republican hold			

=== Pima-14 ===
General election results
Party	Candidate	Votes	%
Democratic	Joe D. Ybarra	2,443	100.00%
Total votes		2,443	100.00%
Democratic hold			

=== Pima-15 ===
General election results
Party	Candidate	Votes	%
Republican	Nick Traficanti	1,981	53.22%
Democratic	Ethel R. Ramsay	1,741	46.78%
Total votes		3,722	100.00%
Republican hold			

=== Pima-16 ===
General election results
Party	Candidate	Votes	%
Democratic	Harold L. Cook (incumbent)	4,084	65.38%
Republican	Robert G. Harrington	2,163	34.62%
Total votes		6,247	100.00%
Democratic hold			

=== Pinal-1 ===
General election results
Party	Candidate	Votes	%
Democratic	Charles Moody (incumbent)	3,476	100.00%
Total votes		3,476	100.00%
Democratic hold			

=== Pinal-2 ===
General election results
Party	Candidate	Votes	%
Democratic	Frederick S. Smith (incumbent)	3,604	75.27%
Republican	David D. Owens	1,184	24.73%
Total votes		4,788	100.00%
Democratic hold			

=== Pinal-3 ===
General election results
Party	Candidate	Votes	%
Democratic	E. B. Thode (incumbent)	3,408	100.00%
Total votes		3,408	100.00%
Democratic hold			

=== Santa Cruz-1 ===
General election results
Party	Candidate	Votes	%
Democratic	Robert R. (Bob) Hathaway (incumbent)	2,359	78.04%
Republican	Clinton L. Mellor	664	21.96%
Total votes		3,023	100.00%
Democratic hold			

=== Yavapai-1 ===
General election results
Party	Candidate	Votes	%
Democratic	Mabel S. Ellis (incumbent)	2,545	100.00%
Total votes		2,545	100.00%
Democratic hold			

=== Yavapai-2 ===
General election results
Party	Candidate	Votes	%
Republican	Raymond Rowland	1,804	50.15%
Democratic	Joseph (Joe) L. Allen (incumbent)	1,793	49.85%
Total votes		3,597	100.00%
Republican gain from Democratic			

=== Yavapai-3 ===
General election results
Party	Candidate	Votes	%
Democratic	Milton O. "Mo" Lindner (incumbent)	1,872	51.66%
Republican	C. H. "Hank" Marion	1,752	48.34%
Total votes		3,624	100.00%
Democratic hold			

=== Yuma-1 ===
General election results
Party	Candidate	Votes	%
Democratic	Cecil D. Miller (incumbent)	2,386	100.00%
Total votes		2,386	100.00%
Democratic hold			

=== Yuma-2 ===
General election results
Party	Candidate	Votes	%
Democratic	Robert L. (Bob) Klauer (incumbent)	3,713	100.00%
Total votes		3,713	100.00%
Democratic hold			

=== Yuma-3 ===
General election results
Party	Candidate	Votes	%
Democratic	Clara Osborne Botzum (incumbent)	2,918	66.48%
Republican	Aubrey B. Barker	1,471	33.52%
Total votes		4,389	100.00%
Democratic hold			
