= 1962 Arizona House of Representatives election =

1962 Arizona House of Representatives elections
- November 6, 1962

All 80 seats in the Arizona House 41 seats needed for a majority
	Majority party	Minority party
Party	Democratic	Republican
Last election	52	28
Seats after	48	32
Seat change	▼4	▲4
Speaker before election
W. L. "Tay" Cook
Democrat
Elected Speaker
W. B. Barkley
Democrat

The 1962 Arizona House of Representatives elections were held on November 6, 1962. Voters elected members of the Arizona House of Representatives in all 80 of the state's House districts to serve a two-year term. The elections coincided with the elections for other offices, including Governor, U.S. Senate, U.S. House, and State Senate. Primary elections were held on September 11, 1962.

Prior to the elections, the Democrats held a majority of 52 seats over the Republicans' 28 seats.

Following the elections, Democrats maintained control of the chamber with 48 Democrats to 32 Republicans, a net gain of four seats for Republicans. Democratic Representative Dr. Charles W. Sechrist took the oath of office January 14, 1963 to fill the seat won by deceased Democrat Dr. Carroll Clark Creighton. Creighton died on election day, November 6, 1962. He would have represented Coconino-1. (Note: Democrat Dr. Carroll Clark Creighton died on election day, November 6, 1962. He would have represented Coconino District 1. He was replaced by Democrat Dr. Charles W. Sechrist who took the oath of office January 14, 1963 (Journal of the House of Representatives, 26th Legislature, 1st Regular Session, 1963, pp. 9-10).)

The newly elected members served in the 26th Arizona State Legislature, during which Democrat W. B. Barkley was chosen as Speaker of the Arizona House. (Note: Barkley was elected as Speaker for the 26th legislature, defeating Representative Hathaway, who was also nominated for Speaker. The vote tally for Speaker was: Barkley-48 votes to Hathaway-32 votes.)

== Summary of Results ==
County	Subdistrict	Incumbent	Party	Elected Representative	Outcome
Apache	Apache-1	James S. Shreeve	Dem	Jack A. Brown	Dem Hold
Cochise	Cochise-1	Clyde M. Dalton	Dem	Andrew J. (Jack) Gilbert (Note: Redistricted from Cochise-2 to Cochise-1.)	Dem Hold
Cochise	Cochise-2	A. J. (Jack) Gilbert	Dem	James A. "Jim" Elliott (Note: Redistricted from Cochise-3 to Cochise-2.)	Dem Hold
Cochise	Cochise-3	James A. (Jim) Elliott	Dem	Fred Burke	Dem Hold
Cochise	Cochise-4	W. L. "Tay" Cook	Dem	Obsolete subdistrict	
Coconino	Coconino-1	Thomas M. (Tommy) Knoles Jr.	Dem	Dr. Charles W. Sechrist	Dem Hold
Coconino	Coconino-2	Harold J. Scudder	Dem	Harold J. Scudder	Dem Hold
Gila	Gila-1	Louis B. Ellsworth Jr.	Dem	Dr. Nelson D. Brayton (Note: Redistricted from Gila-2 to Gila-1.)	Dem Hold
Gila	Gila-2	Dr. Nelson D. Brayton	Dem	E. C. "Polly" Rosenbaum (Note: Redistricted from Gila-3 to Gila-2.)	Dem Hold
Gila	Gila-3	E. C. "Polly" Rosenbaum	Dem	Obsolete subdistrict	
Graham	Graham-1	Gordon L. Hoopes	Dem	Gordon L. Hoopes	Dem Hold
Graham	Graham-2	Milton Lines	Dem	Obsolete subdistrict	
Greenlee	Greenlee-1	Tom W. Berry	Dem	G. O. (Sonny) Biles (Note: Redistricted from Greenlee-2 to Greenlee-1.)	Dem Hold
Greenlee	Greenlee-2	G. O. (Sonny) Biles	Dem	Obsolete subdistrict	
Maricopa	Maricopa-1	Marshall Humphrey	Rep	Marshall Humphrey	Rep Hold
Maricopa	Maricopa-2	William S. (Bill) Porter	Rep	William S. (Bill) Porter	Rep Hold
Maricopa	Maricopa-3	L. Waldo DeWitt	Rep	L. Waldo DeWitt	Rep Hold
Maricopa	Maricopa-4	L. Alton Riggs	Dem	James E. (Jim) Shelley	Rep Gain
Maricopa	Maricopa-5	Elmer (King) King (Note: Redistricted from Maricopa-5 to Maricopa-6.)	Dem	Jim Holley	Rep Gain
Maricopa	Maricopa-6	Carl Austin	Dem	Elmer (King) King	Dem Hold
Maricopa	Maricopa-7	Bob Stump (Note: Redistricted from Maricopa-7 to Maricopa-8.)	Dem	Cloves C. Campbell	Dem Hold
Maricopa	Maricopa-8	Carl Sims, Sr.	Dem	Bob Stump	Dem Hold
Maricopa	Maricopa-9	J. D. Holmes (Note: Redistricted from Maricopa-9 to Maricopa-10.)	Dem	Leon Thompson	Dem Hold
Maricopa	Maricopa-10	Martin P. Toscano (Note: Redistricted from Maricopa-10 to Maricopa-11.)	Dem	J. D. Holmes	Dem Hold
Maricopa	Maricopa-11	David B. Kret (Note: Redistricted from Maricopa-11 to Maricopa-12.)	Rep	Martin P. Toscano	Dem Gain
Maricopa	Maricopa-12	Ralph W. Koch	Rep	David B. Kret	Rep Hold
Maricopa	Maricopa-13	Conrad James Carreon	Dem	William C. Attaway Jr.	Rep Gain
Maricopa	Maricopa-14	Archie C. Ryan (Note: Redistricted from Maricopa-14 to Maricopa-15.)	Dem	W. F. (Pat) Vipperman (Note: Redistricted from Maricopa-20 to Maricopa-14.)	Dem Hold
Maricopa	Maricopa-15	Gerry (Mrs. William C.) Eliot (Note: Redistricted from Maricopa-15 to Maricopa-16.)	Rep	Archie C. Ryan	Dem Gain
Maricopa	Maricopa-16	Robert H. (Bob) Hutto (Note: Redistricted from Maricopa-16 to Maricopa-17.)	Dem	Gerry (Mrs. William C.) Eliot	Rep Gain
Maricopa	Maricopa-17	S. Earl Pugh (Note: Redistricted from Maricopa-17 to Maricopa-18.)	Dem	Robert H. (Bob) Hutto	Dem Hold
Maricopa	Maricopa-18	Robert L. Myers	Rep	S. Earl Pugh	Dem Gain
Maricopa	Maricopa-19	Bob Wilcox (Note: Redistricted from Maricopa-19 to Maricopa-35.)	Rep	Robert (Bob) Brewer (Note: Redistricted from Maricopa-26 to Maricopa-19.)	Rep Hold
Maricopa	Maricopa-20	W. F. (Pat) Vipperman	Dem	Derek Van Dyke	Rep Gain
Maricopa	Maricopa-21	Don Reese (Note: Redistricted from Maricopa-21 to Maricopa-26.)	Rep	George W. Eubank (Note: Redistricted from Maricopa-25 to Maricopa-21.)	Rep Hold
Maricopa	Maricopa-22	Elmer T. Burson (Note: Redistricted from Maricopa-22 to Maricopa-24.)	Rep	Dr. Walter P. Sherrill	Rep Hold
Maricopa	Maricopa-23	F. A. Crane	Dem	Isabel Burgess (Note: Redistricted from Maricopa-31 to Maricopa-23.)	Rep Gain
Maricopa	Maricopa-24	Ruth Peck (Note: Redistricted from Maricopa-24 to Maricopa-28.)	Rep	Elmer T. Burson	Rep Hold
Maricopa	Maricopa-25	George W. Eubank	Rep	John C. Pritzlaff	Rep Hold
Maricopa	Maricopa-26	Robert (Bob) Brewer	Rep	Don Reese	Rep Hold
Maricopa	Maricopa-27	George W. Peck	Dem	F. A. (Jake) Higgins (Note: Redistricted from Maricopa-30 to Maricopa-27.)	Rep Gain
Maricopa	Maricopa-28	Bill Stephens	Dem	Ruth Peck	Rep Gain
Maricopa	Maricopa-29	Priscilla H. Hays (Note: Redistricted from Maricopa-29 to Maricopa-34.)	Rep	Al Frantz	Dem Gain
Maricopa	Maricopa-30	F. A. (Jake) Higgins	Rep	Jim Young	Dem Gain
Maricopa	Maricopa-31	Isabel Burgess	Rep	W. B. Barkley (Note: Redistricted from Maricopa-35 to Maricopa-31.)	Dem Gain
Maricopa	Maricopa-32	Arthur B. Schellenberg	Rep	John Vanlandingham	Dem Gain
Maricopa	Maricopa-33	Merle E. Hays	Dem	Oscar Henry	Dem Hold
Maricopa	Maricopa-34	Gene B. McClellan	Rep	Priscilla H. Hays	Rep Hold
Maricopa	Maricopa-35	W. B. Barkley	Dem	Bob Wilcox	Rep Gain
Maricopa	Maricopa-36	John Wood	Rep	R. Larry Oldham	Rep Hold
Maricopa	Maricopa-37	T. C. (Doc) Rhodes (Note: Redistricted from Maricopa-37 to Maricopa-40.)	Dem	Davidson (Dave) Jenks	Rep Gain
Maricopa	Maricopa-38	Newly Created subdistrict		M.J. (Buck) Brown	Dem Gain
Maricopa	Maricopa-39	Newly Created subdistrict		Ray A. Goetze	Rep Gain
Maricopa	Maricopa-40	Newly Created subdistrict		T. C. (Doc) Rhodes	Dem Gain
Mohave	Mohave-1	J. J. Glancy	Dem	J. J. Glancy	Dem Hold
Navajo	Navajo-1	Augusta T. Larson	Rep	Frank L. Crosby	Dem Gain
Navajo	Navajo-2	Lee F. Dover	Dem	Clay Simer	Dem Hold
Pima	Pima-1	Emmett S. (Bud) Walker	Dem	Emmett S. (Bud) Walker	Dem Hold
Pima	Pima-2	Arnold Elias	Dem	Tony Carrillo	Dem Hold
Pima	Pima-3	Etta Mae Hutcheson	Dem	Etta Mae Hutcheson	Dem Hold
Pima	Pima-4	W. M. (Bill) Carson	Dem	Forrest B. Pearce	Dem Hold
Pima	Pima-5	Dr. Thomas D. Fridena	Dem	Evo J. DeConcini	Dem Hold
Pima	Pima-6	Douglas Stanley Holsclaw	Rep	Douglas Stanley Holsclaw	Rep Hold
Pima	Pima-7	Doris Russell Varn	Rep	Doris Russell Varn	Rep Hold
Pima	Pima-8	David G. Hawkins	Rep	David G. Hawkins	Rep Hold
Pima	Pima-9	John C. (Jack) Jordan	Dem	Richard J. (Dick) Herbert	Dem Hold
Pima	Pima-10	Alvin Henry Wessler	Rep	Alvin Henry Wessler	Rep Hold
Pima	Pima-11	Ray Martin	Dem	Ray Martin	Dem Hold
Pima	Pima-12	John H. Haugh	Rep	John H. Haugh	Rep Hold
Pima	Pima-13	Thomas C. Webster	Rep	Thomas C. Webster	Rep Hold
Pima	Pima-14	Joe D. Ybarra	Dem	Joe D. Ybarra	Dem Hold
Pima	Pima-15	Nick Traficanti	Rep	Edward M. Chambers	Rep Hold
Pima	Pima-16	Harold L. Cook	Dem	Harold L. Cook	Dem Hold
Pima	Pima-17	Newly Created subdistrict		Sandy P. Bowling	Dem Gain
Pinal	Pinal-1	Charles Moody	Dem	Charles Moody	Dem Hold
Pinal	Pinal-2	Frederick S. Smith	Dem	Frederick S. Smith	Dem Hold
Pinal	Pinal-3	E. B. Thode	Dem	Polly Getzwiller	Dem Hold
Santa Cruz	Santa Cruz-1	Robert R. (Bob) Hathaway	Dem	Robert R. (Bob) Hathaway	Dem Hold
Yavapai	Yavapai-1	Mabel S. Ellis	Dem	Mabel S. Ellis	Dem Hold
Yavapai	Yavapai-2	Raymond Rowland	Rep	Boyd Tenney	Rep Hold
Yavapai	Yavapai-3	Milton O. "Mo" Lindner	Dem	Frank B. Ogden	Rep Gain
Yuma	Yuma-1	Cecil D. Miller	Dem	M. G. (Pop) Miniken	Dem Hold
Yuma	Yuma-2	Robert L. (Bob) Klauer	Dem	Charles A. (Charlie) Johnson	Dem Hold
Yuma	Yuma-3	Clara Osborne Botzum	Dem	C.L. (Charlie) Slane	Dem Hold

== Detailed Results ==
=== Apache-1 ===
General election results
Party	Candidate	Votes	%
Democratic	Jack A. Brown	1,703	60.48%
Republican	Richard G. Udall	1,113	39.52%
Total votes		2,816	100.00%
Democratic hold			

=== Cochise-1 ===
General election results
Party	Candidate	Votes	%
Democratic	Andrew J. (Jack) Gilbert (incumbent)	3,656	100.00%
Total votes		3,656	100.00%
Democratic hold			

=== Cochise-2 ===
General election results
Party	Candidate	Votes	%
Democratic	James A. "Jim" Elliott (incumbent)	3,323	100.00%
Total votes		3,323	100.00%
Democratic hold			

=== Cochise-3 ===
General election results
Party	Candidate	Votes	%
Democratic	Fred Burke	3,543	100.00%
Total votes		3,543	100.00%
Democratic hold			

=== Coconino-1 ===
General election results
Party	Candidate	Votes	%
Democratic	Dr. C. C. Creighton	2,665	100.00%
Total votes		2,665	100.00%
Democratic hold			

=== Coconino-2 ===
General election results
Party	Candidate	Votes	%
Democratic	Harold J. Scudder (incumbent)	2,190	50.45%
Republican	E. Jay Whiting	2,151	49.55%
Total votes		4,341	100.00%
Democratic hold			

=== Gila-1 ===
General election results
Party	Candidate	Votes	%
Democratic	Dr. Nelson D. Brayton (incumbent)	3,038	86.53%
Independent	Dr. David B. Gilbert	473	13.47%
Total votes		3,511	100.00%
Democratic hold			

=== Gila-2 ===
General election results
Party	Candidate	Votes	%
Democratic	E. C. "Polly" Rosenbaum (incumbent)	3,662	100.00%
Total votes		3,662	100.00%
Democratic hold			

=== Graham-1 ===
General election results
Party	Candidate	Votes	%
Democratic	Gordon L. Hoopes (incumbent)	3,149	100.00%
Total votes		3,149	100.00%
Democratic hold			

=== Greenlee-1 ===
General election results
Party	Candidate	Votes	%
Democratic	G. O. (Sonny) Biles (incumbent)	3,700	100.00%
Total votes		3,700	100.00%
Democratic hold			

=== Maricopa-1 ===
General election results
Party	Candidate	Votes	%
Republican	Marshall Humphrey (incumbent)	3,395	62.23%
Democratic	Mrs. Claire Phelps	2,061	37.77%
Total votes		5,456	100.00%
Republican hold			

=== Maricopa-2 ===
General election results
Party	Candidate	Votes	%
Republican	William S. (Bill) Porter (incumbent)	3,080	62.44%
Democratic	Steve G. Hale	1,853	37.56%
Total votes		4,933	100.00%
Republican hold			

=== Maricopa-3 ===
General election results
Party	Candidate	Votes	%
Republican	L. Waldo DeWitt (incumbent)	3,603	68.88%
Democratic	Joseph S. Jarvis	1,628	31.12%
Total votes		5,231	100.00%
Republican hold			

=== Maricopa-4 ===
General election results
Party	Candidate	Votes	%
Republican	James E. (Jim) Shelley	2,712	51.27%
Democratic	Max Connolly	2,578	48.73%
Total votes		5,290	100.00%
Republican gain from Democratic			

=== Maricopa-5 ===
General election results
Party	Candidate	Votes	%
Republican	Jim Holley	2,772	55.34%
Democratic	Martin Mortensen	2,237	44.66%
Total votes		5,009	100.00%
Republican gain from Democratic			

=== Maricopa-6 ===
General election results
Party	Candidate	Votes	%
Democratic	Elmer (King) King (incumbent)	2,466	53.12%
Republican	Dr. D. L. Dugger	2,176	46.88%
Total votes		4,642	100.00%
Democratic hold			

=== Maricopa-7 ===
General election results
Party	Candidate	Votes	%
Democratic	Cloves C. Campbell	2,764	75.19%
Republican	Edward (Ed) Banks	912	24.81%
Total votes		3,676	100.00%
Democratic hold			

=== Maricopa-8 ===
General election results
Party	Candidate	Votes	%
Democratic	Bob Stump (incumbent)	3,038	74.08%
Republican	Wilma (Billie) Babcock	1,063	25.92%
Total votes		4,101	100.00%
Democratic hold			

=== Maricopa-9 ===
General election results
Party	Candidate	Votes	%
Democratic	Leon Thompson	2,943	83.70%
Republican	B. Clarence Marsell	573	16.30%
Total votes		3,516	100.00%
Democratic hold			

=== Maricopa-10 ===
General election results
Party	Candidate	Votes	%
Democratic	J. D. Holmes (incumbent)	3,020	81.38%
Republican	Ludie I. Catlett	691	18.62%
Total votes		3,711	100.00%
Democratic hold			

=== Maricopa-11 ===
General election results
Party	Candidate	Votes	%
Democratic	Martin P. Toscano (incumbent)	2,421	51.62%
Republican	Fred M. Jahn	2,269	48.38%
Total votes		4,690	100.00%
Democratic gain from Republican			

=== Maricopa-12 ===
General election results
Party	Candidate	Votes	%
Republican	David B. Kret (incumbent)	3,409	62.04%
Democratic	Donald G. Murray	2,086	37.96%
Total votes		5,495	100.00%
Republican hold			

=== Maricopa-13 ===
General election results
Party	Candidate	Votes	%
Republican	William C. Attaway Jr.	2,506	57.19%
Democratic	A. B. Campbell	1,876	42.81%
Total votes		4,382	100.00%
Republican gain from Democratic			

=== Maricopa-14 ===
General election results
Party	Candidate	Votes	%
Democratic	W. F. (Pat) Vipperman (incumbent)	2,514	53.84%
Republican	D. Lee Jones	2,155	46.16%
Total votes		4,669	100.00%
Democratic hold			

=== Maricopa-15 ===
General election results
Party	Candidate	Votes	%
Democratic	Archie C. Ryan (incumbent)	2,480	59.96%
Republican	Bert C. Armstrong	1,656	40.04%
Total votes		4,136	100.00%
Democratic gain from Republican			

=== Maricopa-16 ===
General election results
Party	Candidate	Votes	%
Republican	Gerry (Mrs. William C.) Eliot (incumbent)	2,136	56.37%
Democratic	Harry S. Ruppelius	1,653	43.63%
Total votes		3,789	100.00%
Republican gain from Democratic			

=== Maricopa-17 ===
General election results
Party	Candidate	Votes	%
Democratic	Robert H. (Bob) Hutto (incumbent)	2,283	58.05%
Republican	David Helfstein	1,650	41.95%
Total votes		3,933	100.00%
Democratic hold			

=== Maricopa-18 ===
General election results
Party	Candidate	Votes	%
Democratic	S. Earl Pugh (incumbent)	3,336	56.25%
Republican	Wanda R. Jacobs	2,595	43.75%
Total votes		5,931	100.00%
Democratic gain from Republican			

=== Maricopa-19 ===
General election results
Party	Candidate	Votes	%
Republican	Robert (Bob) Brewer (incumbent)	2,522	55.50%
Democratic	Kenneth (Ken) deRoulhac	2,022	44.50%
Total votes		4,544	100.00%
Republican hold			

=== Maricopa-20 ===
General election results
Party	Candidate	Votes	%
Republican	Derek Van Dyke	2,721	61.05%
Democratic	Gerald A. Pollock	1,736	38.95%
Total votes		4,457	100.00%
Republican gain from Democratic			

=== Maricopa-21 ===
General election results
Party	Candidate	Votes	%
Republican	George W. Eubank (incumbent)	2,605	57.70%
Democratic	Sabra M. Anderson	1,910	42.30%
Total votes		4,515	100.00%
Republican hold			

=== Maricopa-22 ===
General election results
Party	Candidate	Votes	%
Republican	Dr. Walter P. Sherrill	2,775	58.37%
Democratic	James (Jim) Fox	1,979	41.63%
Total votes		4,754	100.00%
Republican hold			

=== Maricopa-23 ===
General election results
Party	Candidate	Votes	%
Republican	Isabel Burgess (incumbent)	3,650	100.00%
Total votes		3,650	100.00%
Republican gain from Democratic			

=== Maricopa-24 ===
General election results
Party	Candidate	Votes	%
Republican	Elmer T. Burson (incumbent)	3,224	100.00%
Total votes		3,224	100.00%
Republican hold			

=== Maricopa-25 ===
General election results
Party	Candidate	Votes	%
Republican	John C. Pritzlaff	3,213	73.57%
Democratic	Joe Sarwin	1,154	26.43%
Total votes		4,367	100.00%
Republican hold			

=== Maricopa-26 ===
General election results
Party	Candidate	Votes	%
Republican	Don Reese (incumbent)	4,495	73.36%
Democratic	Charles Montooth	1,632	26.64%
Total votes		6,127	100.00%
Republican hold			

=== Maricopa-27 ===
General election results
Party	Candidate	Votes	%
Republican	F. A. (Jake) Higgins (incumbent)	2,960	59.58%
Democratic	Walter O. Hagen	2,008	40.42%
Total votes		4,968	100.00%
Republican gain from Democratic			

=== Maricopa-28 ===
General election results
Party	Candidate	Votes	%
Republican	Ruth Peck (incumbent)	2,825	62.53%
Democratic	Martha Struckmeyer Smith	1,693	37.47%
Total votes		4,518	100.00%
Republican gain from Democratic			

=== Maricopa-29 ===
General election results
Party	Candidate	Votes	%
Democratic	Al Frantz	2,513	54.07%
Republican	Cal Vander Molen	2,135	45.93%
Total votes		4,648	100.00%
Democratic gain from Republican			

=== Maricopa-30 ===
General election results
Party	Candidate	Votes	%
Democratic	Jim Young	2,937	62.37%
Republican	James Gordon Blake	1,772	37.63%
Total votes		4,709	100.00%
Democratic gain from Republican			

=== Maricopa-31 ===
General election results
Party	Candidate	Votes	%
Democratic	W. B. Barkley (incumbent)	2,843	59.35%
Republican	Edwin R. Hayek	1,947	40.65%
Total votes		4,790	100.00%
Democratic gain from Republican			

=== Maricopa-32 ===
General election results
Party	Candidate	Votes	%
Democratic	John Vanlandingham	3,065	51.56%
Republican	Beryl B. Fox	2,880	48.44%
Total votes		5,945	100.00%
Democratic gain from Republican			

=== Maricopa-33 ===
General election results
Party	Candidate	Votes	%
Democratic	Oscar Henry	2,458	52.40%
Republican	Jack Dwaine Jones	2,233	47.60%
Total votes		4,691	100.00%
Democratic hold			

=== Maricopa-34 ===
General election results
Party	Candidate	Votes	%
Republican	Priscilla H. Hays (incumbent)	2,971	63.61%
Democratic	Helen A. Ruman	1,700	36.39%
Total votes		4,671	100.00%
Republican hold			

=== Maricopa-35 ===
General election results
Party	Candidate	Votes	%
Republican	Bob Wilcox (incumbent)	3,291	66.93%
Democratic	R. B. (Dick) Bridgewater	1,626	33.07%
Total votes		4,917	100.00%
Republican gain from Democratic			

=== Maricopa-36 ===
General election results
Party	Candidate	Votes	%
Republican	R. Larry Oldham	2,941	60.85%
Democratic	Dan J. Mulvihill	1,892	39.15%
Total votes		4,833	100.00%
Republican hold			

=== Maricopa-37 ===
General election results
Party	Candidate	Votes	%
Republican	Davidson (Dave) Jenks	2,850	52.51%
Democratic	Norine L. Lee	2,578	47.49%
Total votes		5,428	100.00%
Republican gain from Democratic			

=== Maricopa-38 ===
General election results
Party	Candidate	Votes	%
Democratic	M.J. (Buck) Brown	2,483	54.33%
Republican	William J. Dickson	2,087	45.67%
Total votes		4,570	100.00%
Democratic gain from Republican			

=== Maricopa-39 ===
General election results
Party	Candidate	Votes	%
Republican	Ray A. Goetze	2,811	59.33%
Democratic	John C. Padelford	1,927	40.67%
Total votes		4,738	100.00%
Republican gain from Democratic			

=== Maricopa-40 ===
General election results
Party	Candidate	Votes	%
Democratic	T. C. (Doc) Rhodes (incumbent)	3,071	67.32%
Republican	M. B. (Max) Shears	1,491	32.68%
Total votes		4,562	100.00%
Democratic gain from Republican			

=== Mohave-1 ===
General election results
Party	Candidate	Votes	%
Democratic	J. J. Glancy (incumbent)	1,704	58.80%
Republican	Wilma A. Brummett	1,194	41.20%
Total votes		2,898	100.00%
Democratic hold			

=== Navajo-1 ===
General election results
Party	Candidate	Votes	%
Democratic	Frank L. Crosby	2,231	55.35%
Republican	M. M. "Bud" Johnson	1,800	44.65%
Total votes		4,031	100.00%
Democratic gain from Republican			

=== Navajo-2 ===
General election results
Party	Candidate	Votes	%
Democratic	Clay Simer	2,171	100.00%
Total votes		2,171	100.00%
Democratic hold			

=== Pima-1 ===
General election results
Party	Candidate	Votes	%
Democratic	Emmett S. "Bud" Walker (incumbent)	1,749	71.48%
Republican	Marilyn Anne Schoof	698	28.52%
Total votes		2,447	100.00%
Democratic hold			

=== Pima-2 ===
General election results
Party	Candidate	Votes	%
Democratic	Tony Carrillo	3,199	68.59%
Republican	Ralph Curtis	1,465	31.41%
Total votes		4,664	100.00%
Democratic hold			

=== Pima-3 ===
General election results
Party	Candidate	Votes	%
Democratic	Etta Mae Hutcheson (incumbent)	2,423	90.48%
Independent	Chris Quezada	255	9.52%
Total votes		2,678	100.00%
Democratic hold			

=== Pima-4 ===
General election results
Party	Candidate	Votes	%
Democratic	Forrest B. Pearce	2,368	65.07%
Republican	G. W. Irvin	1,271	34.93%
Total votes		3,639	100.00%
Democratic hold			

=== Pima-5 ===
General election results
Party	Candidate	Votes	%
Democratic	Evo J. DeConcini	1,852	53.84%
Republican	R. L. (Dick) Apperson	1,588	46.16%
Total votes		3,440	100.00%
Democratic hold			

=== Pima-6 ===
General election results
Party	Candidate	Votes	%
Republican	Douglas Stanley Holsclaw (incumbent)	2,324	100.00%
Total votes		2,324	100.00%
Republican hold			

=== Pima-7 ===
General election results
Party	Candidate	Votes	%
Republican	Doris Russell Varn (incumbent)	2,089	50.95%
Democratic	Rosalind Livermore	2,011	49.05%
Total votes		4,100	100.00%
Republican hold			

=== Pima-8 ===
General election results
Party	Candidate	Votes	%
Republican	David G. Hawkins (incumbent)	2,715	64.67%
Democratic	Edgar H. Darby	1,483	35.33%
Total votes		4,198	100.00%
Republican hold			

=== Pima-9 ===
General election results
Party	Candidate	Votes	%
Democratic	Richard J. (Dick) Herbert	2,504	63.07%
Republican	Ruth Borger Fitzgerald	1,466	36.93%
Total votes		3,970	100.00%
Democratic hold			

=== Pima-10 ===
General election results
Party	Candidate	Votes	%
Republican	Alvin Henry Wessler (incumbent)	2,427	56.75%
Democratic	Porter W. Long	1,850	43.25%
Total votes		4,277	100.00%
Republican hold			

=== Pima-11 ===
General election results
Party	Candidate	Votes	%
Democratic	Ray Martin (incumbent)	2,065	54.80%
Republican	Albert C. Williams	1,703	45.20%
Total votes		3,768	100.00%
Democratic hold			

=== Pima-12 ===
General election results
Party	Candidate	Votes	%
Republican	John H. Haugh (incumbent)	3,244	100.00%
Total votes		3,244	100.00%
Republican hold			

=== Pima-13 ===
General election results
Party	Candidate	Votes	%
Republican	Thomas C. Webster (incumbent)	2,759	54.24%
Democratic	Byron W. Garigan	2,328	45.76%
Total votes		5,087	100.00%
Republican hold			

=== Pima-14 ===
General election results
Party	Candidate	Votes	%
Democratic	Joe D. Ybarra (incumbent)	2,747	73.35%
Republican	James R. Grainer	998	26.65%
Total votes		3,745	100.00%
Democratic hold			

=== Pima-15 ===
General election results
Party	Candidate	Votes	%
Republican	Edward M. Chambers	2,289	55.17%
Democratic	George A. Kohler Jr.	1,860	44.83%
Total votes		4,149	100.00%
Republican hold			

=== Pima-16 ===
General election results
Party	Candidate	Votes	%
Democratic	Harold L. Cook (incumbent)	2,626	65.19%
Republican	T. E. (Ted) Wirkus	1,402	34.81%
Total votes		4,028	100.00%
Democratic hold			

=== Pima-17 ===
General election results
Party	Candidate	Votes	%
Democratic	Sandy P. Bowling	2,255	54.71%
Republican	Larry L. Dier	1,867	45.29%
Total votes		4,122	100.00%
Democratic gain from Republican			

=== Pinal-1 ===
General election results
Party	Candidate	Votes	%
Democratic	Charles Moody (incumbent)	3,556	100.00%
Total votes		3,556	100.00%
Democratic hold			

=== Pinal-2 ===
General election results
Party	Candidate	Votes	%
Democratic	Frederick S. Smith (incumbent)	3,939	100.00%
Total votes		3,939	100.00%
Democratic hold			

=== Pinal-3 ===
General election results
Party	Candidate	Votes	%
Democratic	Polly Getzwiller	2,590	61.73%
Republican	Arthur Ward Jr.	1,606	38.27%
Total votes		4,196	100.00%
Democratic hold			

=== Santa Cruz-1 ===
General election results
Party	Candidate	Votes	%
Democratic	Robert R. (Bob) Hathaway (incumbent)	2,627	100.00%
Total votes		2,627	100.00%
Democratic hold			

=== Yavapai-1 ===
General election results
Party	Candidate	Votes	%
Democratic	Mabel S. Ellis (incumbent)	1,780	50.45%
Republican	Sylvia Reuter	1,748	49.55%
Total votes		3,528	100.00%
Democratic hold			

=== Yavapai-2 ===
General election results
Party	Candidate	Votes	%
Republican	Boyd Tenney	2,184	63.32%
Democratic	Blaine Bowman	1,265	36.68%
Total votes		3,449	100.00%
Republican hold			

=== Yavapai-3 ===
General election results
Party	Candidate	Votes	%
Republican	Frank B. Ogden	1,813	50.87%
Democratic	Leo Sullivan	1,751	49.13%
Total votes		3,564	100.00%
Republican gain from Democratic			

=== Yuma-1 ===
General election results
Party	Candidate	Votes	%
Democratic	M. G. (Pop) Miniken	2,795	100.00%
Total votes		2,795	100.00%
Democratic hold			

=== Yuma-2 ===
General election results
Party	Candidate	Votes	%
Democratic	Charles A. (Charlie) Johnson	2,434	65.47%
Republican	Tom Black	1,284	34.53%
Total votes		3,718	100.00%
Democratic hold			

=== Yuma-3 ===
General election results
Party	Candidate	Votes	%
Democratic	C.L. (Charlie) Slane	3,015	100.00%
Total votes		3,015	100.00%
Democratic hold			
