= 1956 Arizona House of Representatives election =

1956 Arizona House of Representatives elections
- November 6, 1956

All 80 seats in the Arizona House 41 seats needed for a majority
	Majority party	Minority party
Party	Democratic	Republican
Seats before	60	20
Seats after	57	23
Seat change	▼3	▲3
Speaker before election
Harry S. Ruppelius
Democrat
Elected Speaker
W. L. "Tay" Cook
Democrat

The 1956 Arizona House of Representatives elections were held on November 6, 1956. Voters elected members of the Arizona House of Representatives in all 80 of the state's House districts to serve a two-year term. The elections coincided with the elections for other offices, including Governor, U.S. Senate, U.S. House, and State Senate. Primary elections were held on September 11, 1956.

Prior to the elections, the Democrats held a majority of 60 seats over the Republicans' 20 seats.

Following the election, Democrats maintained control of the chamber with 57 Democrats to 23 Republicans, a net gain of three seats for Republicans.

The newly elected members served in the 23rd Arizona State Legislature, during which Democrat W. L. "Tay" Cook was chosen as Speaker of the Arizona House. (Note: Cook was elected unanimously as Speaker for the 23rd legislature.)

== Retirements ==
=== Democrats ===
1. Coconino-1: Andrew (Andy) Matson
2. Maricopa-3: Robert A. Petrie
3. Maricopa-7: J. P. "Jess" Stump
4. Maricopa-9: Sidney Kartus
5. Maricopa-11: Neales Kennedy
6. Maricopa-12: W. W. Franklin
7. Maricopa-15: George R. Steward
8. Maricopa-17: Norman Lee
9. Maricopa-21: Laura M. McRae
10. Maricopa-25: Patrick W. O'Reilly
11. Maricopa-32: Charles H. Abels
12. Maricopa-33: Champe Raftery
13. Maricopa-34: William Younger Wood
14. Maricopa-35: Hal F. Warner
15. Mohave-1: Guy Rutherford
16. Pima-1: David S. Wine
17. Pima-2: Enos P. Schaffer
18. Pima-4: James L. Kennedy
19. Pima-9: William L. Minor
20. Pima-14: Vicente Alfaro
21. Pima-16: Harry Ackerman
22. Yuma-2: William B. Carr Jr.
23. Yuma-3: David B. Babbitt

=== Republicans ===
1. Maricopa-2: William S. "Bill" Porter
2. Maricopa-28: C. H. Marion
3. Maricopa-29: James B. Phillips
4. Maricopa-30: Robert L. Myers
5. Pima-15: Marion Harold Burton

== Incumbents Defeated in General Elections ==
=== Democrats ===
1. Maricopa-16: Harry S. Ruppelius
2. Maricopa-18: Ruth I. Hunt

=== Republicans ===
1. Apache-1: Lorin M. Farr

== Summary of Results ==
County	Subdistrict	Incumbent	Party	Elected Representative	Outcome
Apache	Apache-1	Lorin M. Farr	Rep	James S. Shreeve	Dem Gain
Cochise	Cochise-1	Clyde M. Dalton	Dem	Clyde M. Dalton	Dem Hold
Cochise	Cochise-2	H. J. (Duffy) Lewis (Note: Cochise County Board of Supervisors appointed Democrat H. J. (Duffy) Lewis to fill the unexpired term of Mrs. Evelyn Anderson Mulheim (Democrat), who had resigned.)	Dem	H. J. (Duffy) Lewis	Dem Hold
Cochise	Cochise-3	Charles O. Bloomquist	Dem	Charles O. Bloomquist	Dem Hold
Cochise	Cochise-4	W. L. "Tay" Cook	Dem	W. L. "Tay" Cook	Dem Hold
Coconino	Coconino-1	Andrew (Andy) Matson	Dem	Thomas M. (Tommy) Knoles Jr.	Dem Hold
Coconino	Coconino-2	Harold J. Scudder	Dem	Harold J. Scudder	Dem Hold
Gila	Gila-1	Louis B. Ellsworth Jr.	Dem	Louis B. Ellsworth Jr.	Dem Hold
Gila	Gila-2	Nelson D. Brayton	Dem	Nelson D. Brayton	Dem Hold
Gila	Gila-3	Edwynne C. "Polly" Rosenbaum	Dem	Edwynne C. "Polly" Rosenbaum	Dem Hold
Graham	Graham-1	E. L. Tidwell	Dem	E. L. Tidwell	Dem Hold
Graham	Graham-2	Milton Lines	Dem	Milton Lines	Dem Hold
Greenlee	Greenlee-1	Tom W. Berry	Dem	Tom W. Berry	Dem Hold
Greenlee	Greenlee-2	G. O. (Sonny) Biles	Dem	G. O. (Sonny) Biles	Dem Hold
Maricopa	Maricopa-1	Ed Ellsworth	Dem	Ed Ellsworth	Dem Hold
Maricopa	Maricopa-2	William S. "Bill" Porter	Rep	Vernon Hathcock (Note: During the 23rd Arizona State Legislature, Representative Hathcock changed party from Republican to Democrat.)	Rep Hold
Maricopa	Maricopa-3	Robert A. Petrie	Dem	Laron Waldo DeWitt	Rep Gain
Maricopa	Maricopa-4	J. O. Grimes	Dem	J. O. Grimes	Dem Hold
Maricopa	Maricopa-5	W. W. Mitchell Sr.	Dem	W. W. Mitchell Sr.	Dem Hold
Maricopa	Maricopa-6	Carl Austin	Dem	Carl Austin	Dem Hold
Maricopa	Maricopa-7	J. P. "Jess" Stump	Dem	J. R. (Dick) Johnson	Dem Hold
Maricopa	Maricopa-8	Carl Sims Sr.	Dem	Carl Sims Sr.	Dem Hold
Maricopa	Maricopa-9	Sidney Kartus	Dem	Arlo O. Gooch	Dem Hold
Maricopa	Maricopa-10	R. E. "Bob" Wilson	Dem	Sherman R. Dent	Dem Hold
Maricopa	Maricopa-11	Neales "Nick" Kennedy	Dem	Bob E. Wilson	Dem Hold
Maricopa	Maricopa-12	W. W. Franklin	Dem	Marie S. Earl	Dem Hold
Maricopa	Maricopa-13	Conrad James Carreon	Dem	Conrad James Carreon	Dem Hold
Maricopa	Maricopa-14	William J. Harkness	Dem	William J. Harkness	Dem Hold
Maricopa	Maricopa-15	George R. "Rusty" Steward	Dem	L. S. (Dick) Adams	Dem Hold
Maricopa	Maricopa-16	Harry S. Ruppelius	Dem	Geraldine F. (Gerry) Eliot	Rep Gain
Maricopa	Maricopa-17	Norman "Shorty" Lee	Dem	Jack E. Gardner	Dem Hold
Maricopa	Maricopa-18	Ruth I. Hunt	Dem	Robert (Bob) Brewer	Rep Gain
Maricopa	Maricopa-19	Carl C. Andersen	Rep	Carl C. Andersen	Rep Hold
Maricopa	Maricopa-20	Malcolm L. Lentz	Rep	Malcolm L. Lentz	Rep Hold
Maricopa	Maricopa-21	Mrs. Laura M. McRae	Dem	Emogene M. Jennings	Rep Gain
Maricopa	Maricopa-22	W. I. (Ike) Lowry	Rep	W. I. (Ike) Lowry	Rep Hold
Maricopa	Maricopa-23	Lillian Retzloff	Dem	Lillian Retzloff	Dem Hold
Maricopa	Maricopa-24	Ruth Adams White	Rep	Ruth Adams White	Rep Hold
Maricopa	Maricopa-25	Patrick W. O'Reilly	Dem	Isabel Burgess	Rep Gain
Maricopa	Maricopa-26	David H. Campbell	Rep	David H. Campbell	Rep Hold
Maricopa	Maricopa-27	Del Rogers	Dem	Del Rogers	Dem Hold
Maricopa	Maricopa-28	C. H. "Hank" Marion	Rep	Robert C. Forquer	Rep Hold
Maricopa	Maricopa-29	James B. Phillips	Rep	John C. Hughes	Dem Gain
Maricopa	Maricopa-30	Robert L. Myers	Rep	R. H. (Bob) Wallace	Rep Hold
Maricopa	Maricopa-31	Arthur B. Schellenberg	Rep	Arthur B. Schellenberg	Rep Hold
Maricopa	Maricopa-32	Charles H. Abels	Dem	William J. Kamp	Dem Hold
Maricopa	Maricopa-33	Champe Raftery	Dem	Bill Stephens	Dem Hold
Maricopa	Maricopa-34	William Younger Wood	Dem	W. B. Barkley	Dem Hold
Maricopa	Maricopa-35	Hal Fred Warner	Dem	Lewis B. Bramkamp	Dem Hold
Maricopa	Maricopa-36	S. Earl Pugh	Dem	S. Earl Pugh	Dem Hold
Maricopa	Maricopa-37	T. C. (Doc) Rhodes	Dem	T. C. (Doc) Rhodes	Dem Hold
Mohave	Mohave-1	Guy Rutherford	Dem	J. J. Glancy	Dem Hold
Navajo	Navajo-1	Augusta T. Larson	Rep	Augusta T. Larson	Rep Hold
Navajo	Navajo-2	Lee F. Dover	Dem	Lee F. Dover	Dem Hold
Pima	Pima-1	David S. Wine	Dem	Eaner T. Seaberg	Dem Hold
Pima	Pima-2	Enos P. "Pepe" Schaffer	Dem	James N. Corbett Jr.	Dem Hold
Pima	Pima-3	Etta Mae Hutcheson	Dem	Etta Mae Hutcheson	Dem Hold
Pima	Pima-4	James L. "Jimmy" Kennedy	Dem	William M. Carson	Dem Hold
Pima	Pima-5	Dr. Thomas D. Fridena	Dem	Dr. Thomas D. Fridena	Dem Hold
Pima	Pima-6	Douglas S. Holsclaw	Rep	Douglas S. Holsclaw	Rep Hold
Pima	Pima-7	Julliette C. Willis	Rep	Julliette C. Willis	Rep Hold
Pima	Pima-8	V. S. "John" Hostetter	Rep	V. S. "John" Hostetter	Rep Hold
Pima	Pima-9	William L. Minor	Dem	Marvin L. Burton	Dem Hold
Pima	Pima-10	Alvin H. Wessler	Rep	Alvin H. Wessler	Rep Hold
Pima	Pima-11	James W. Carroll	Dem	James W. Carroll	Dem Hold
Pima	Pima-12	John H. Haugh	Rep	John H. Haugh	Rep Hold
Pima	Pima-13	Keith S. Brown	Rep	Keith S. Brown	Rep Hold
Pima	Pima-14	Vicente Alfaro	Dem	Frank G. Robles	Dem Hold
Pima	Pima-15	Marion Harold Burton	Rep	W. G. "Bill" Bodell	Rep Hold
Pima	Pima-16	Harry Ackerman	Dem	Harold L. Cook	Dem Hold
Pinal	Pinal-1	Harry Bagnall	Dem	Harry Bagnall	Dem Hold
Pinal	Pinal-2	Frederick S. Smith	Dem	Frederick S. Smith	Dem Hold
Pinal	Pinal-3	Mrs. Edna Blodwen "Blodie" Thode	Dem	Mrs. Edna Blodwen "Blodie" Thode	Dem Hold
Santa Cruz	Santa Cruz-1	Robert R. Hathaway (Note: Santa Cruz County Board of Supervisors appointed Democrat Mrs. Weldon (Josephine) Bailey to serve until Hathaway became 25 years old.)	Dem	Robert R. Hathaway	Dem Hold
Yavapai	Yavapai-1	Mabel S. Ellis	Dem	Mabel S. Ellis	Dem Hold
Yavapai	Yavapai-2	Dick W. Martin	Rep	Dick W. Martin	Rep Hold
Yavapai	Yavapai-3	Milton O. "Moe" Lindner Sr. (Note: Yavapai County Board of Supervisors appointed Democrat Milton O. "Moe" Lindner, Sr. to fill the unexpired term caused by A.C. McCoy's death.)	Dem	Milton O. "Moe" Lindner Sr.	Dem Hold
Yuma	Yuma-1	Robert L. "Bob" Klauer	Dem	Robert L. "Bob" Klauer	Dem Hold
Yuma	Yuma-2	William B. Carr Jr.	Dem	John C. Smith Jr.	Dem Hold
Yuma	Yuma-3	David B. Babbitt	Dem	Al Lindsey	Dem Hold

== Detailed Results ==
=== Apache-1 ===
General election results
Party	Candidate	Votes	%
Democratic	James S. Shreeve	1,478	56.87%
Republican	Lorin M. Farr (incumbent)	1,121	43.13%
Total votes		2,599	100.00%
Democratic gain from Republican			

=== Cochise-1 ===
General election results
Party	Candidate	Votes	%
Democratic	Clyde M. Dalton (incumbent)	2,498	100.00%
Total votes		2,498	100.00%
Democratic hold			

=== Cochise-2 ===
General election results
Party	Candidate	Votes	%
Democratic	H.J. (Duffy) Lewis (incumbent)	2,827	100.00%
Total votes		2,827	100.00%
Democratic hold			

=== Cochise-3 ===
General election results
Party	Candidate	Votes	%
Democratic	Charles O. Bloomquist (incumbent)	1,799	100.00%
Total votes		1,799	100.00%
Democratic hold			

=== Cochise-4 ===
General election results
Party	Candidate	Votes	%
Democratic	W. L. "Tay" Cook (incumbent)	2,105	100.00%
Total votes		2,105	100.00%
Democratic hold			

=== Coconino-1 ===
General election results
Party	Candidate	Votes	%
Democratic	Thomas M. (Tommy) Knoles Jr.	3,031	100.00%
Total votes		3,031	100.00%
Democratic hold			

=== Coconino-2 ===
General election results
Party	Candidate	Votes	%
Democratic	Harold J. Scudder (incumbent)	1,212	53.68%
Republican	Harry F. Sutherland	1,046	46.32%
Total votes		2,258	100.00%
Democratic hold			

=== Gila-1 ===
General election results
Party	Candidate	Votes	%
Democratic	Louis B. Ellsworth Jr. (incumbent)	1,435	71.79%
Republican	R. E. "Arky" Burnham (Note: Was a write-in candidate in the general election.)	564	28.21%
Total votes		1,999	100.00%
Democratic hold			

=== Gila-2 ===
General election results
Party	Candidate	Votes	%
Democratic	Nelson D. Brayton (incumbent)	1,664	100.00%
Total votes		1,664	100.00%
Democratic hold			

=== Gila-3 ===
General election results
Party	Candidate	Votes	%
Democratic	Edwynne C. "Polly" Rosenbaum (incumbent)	2,778	100.00%
Total votes		2,778	100.00%
Democratic hold			

=== Graham-1 ===
General election results
Party	Candidate	Votes	%
Democratic	E. L. Tidwell (incumbent)	1,914	100.00%
Total votes		1,914	100.00%
Democratic hold			

=== Graham-2 ===
General election results
Party	Candidate	Votes	%
Democratic	Milton Lines (incumbent)	797	100.00%
Total votes		797	100.00%
Democratic hold			

=== Greenlee-1 ===
General election results
Party	Candidate	Votes	%
Democratic	Tom W. Berry (incumbent)	1,665	100.00%
Total votes		1,665	100.00%
Democratic hold			

=== Greenlee-2 ===
General election results
Party	Candidate	Votes	%
Democratic	G. O. (Sonny) Biles (incumbent)	2,101	100.00%
Total votes		2,101	100.00%
Democratic hold			

=== Maricopa-1 ===
General election results
Party	Candidate	Votes	%
Democratic	Ed Ellsworth (incumbent)	1,649	50.52%
Republican	Marshall Humphrey	1,615	49.48%
Total votes		3,264	100.00%
Democratic hold			

=== Maricopa-2 ===
General election results
Party	Candidate	Votes	%
Republican	Vernon Hathcock	2,680	60.50%
Democratic	Charles Rogers	1,750	39.50%
Total votes		4,430	100.00%
Republican hold			

=== Maricopa-3 ===
General election results
Party	Candidate	Votes	%
Republican	Laron Waldo DeWitt	2,446	55.46%
Democratic	Wayne C. Pomeroy	1,964	44.54%
Total votes		4,410	100.00%
Republican gain from Democratic			

=== Maricopa-4 ===
General election results
Party	Candidate	Votes	%
Democratic	J. O. Grimes (incumbent)	2,065	54.24%
Republican	Chester A. Smith	1,742	45.76%
Total votes		3,807	100.00%
Democratic hold			

=== Maricopa-5 ===
General election results
Party	Candidate	Votes	%
Democratic	W. W. Mitchell, Sr. (incumbent)	2,562	62.40%
Republican	Donald J. Phillips	1,544	37.60%
Total votes		4,106	100.00%
Democratic hold			

=== Maricopa-6 ===
General election results
Party	Candidate	Votes	%
Democratic	Carl Austin (incumbent)	2,426	100.00%
Total votes		2,426	100.00%
Democratic hold			

=== Maricopa-7 ===
General election results
Party	Candidate	Votes	%
Democratic	J. R. (Dick) Johnson (incumbent)	2,136	73.43%
Republican	Cecil F. Eaton	773	26.57%
Total votes		2,909	100.00%
Democratic hold			

=== Maricopa-8 ===
General election results
Party	Candidate	Votes	%
Democratic	Carl Sims, Sr. (incumbent)	2,440	100.00%
Total votes		2,440	100.00%
Democratic hold			

=== Maricopa-9 ===
General election results
Party	Candidate	Votes	%
Democratic	Arlo O. Gooch	2,154	100.00%
Total votes		2,154	100.00%
Democratic hold			

=== Maricopa-10 ===
General election results
Party	Candidate	Votes	%
Democratic	Sherman R. Dent	2,145	69.04%
Republican	Della I. Cain	962	30.96%
Total votes		3,107	100.00%
Democratic hold			

=== Maricopa-11 ===
General election results
Party	Candidate	Votes	%
Democratic	Bob E. Wilson (incumbent)	2,965	51.91%
Republican	Frank J. Sagarino	2,747	48.09%
Total votes		5,712	100.00%
Democratic hold			

=== Maricopa-12 ===
General election results
Party	Candidate	Votes	%
Democratic	Marie S. Earl	1,720	57.66%
Republican	David J. Perry	1,263	42.34%
Total votes		2,983	100.00%
Democratic hold			

=== Maricopa-13 ===
General election results
Party	Candidate	Votes	%
Democratic	Conrad James Carreon (incumbent)	1,346	61.13%
Republican	W. P. Spainhower	856	38.87%
Total votes		2,202	100.00%
Democratic hold			

=== Maricopa-14 ===
General election results
Party	Candidate	Votes	%
Democratic	William J. Harkness (incumbent)	1,760	100.00%
Total votes		1,760	100.00%
Democratic hold			

=== Maricopa-15 ===
General election results
Party	Candidate	Votes	%
Democratic	L. S. (Dick) Adams	1,579	100.00%
Total votes		1,579	100.00%
Democratic hold			

=== Maricopa-16 ===
General election results
Party	Candidate	Votes	%
Republican	Geraldine F. (Gerry) Eliot	1,551	53.41%
Democratic	Harry S. Ruppelius (incumbent)	1,353	46.59%
Total votes		2,904	100.00%
Republican gain from Democratic			

=== Maricopa-17 ===
General election results
Party	Candidate	Votes	%
Democratic	Jack E. Gardner	1,863	100.00%
Total votes		1,863	100.00%
Democratic hold			

=== Maricopa-18 ===
General election results
Party	Candidate	Votes	%
Republican	Robert (Bob) Brewer	3,362	50.82%
Democratic	Ruth I. Hunt (incumbent)	3,253	49.18%
Total votes		6,615	100.00%
Republican gain from Democratic			

=== Maricopa-19 ===
General election results
Party	Candidate	Votes	%
Republican	Carl C. Andersen (incumbent)	2,131	64.36%
Democratic	Stephen W. Connors	1,180	35.64%
Total votes		3,311	100.00%
Republican hold			

=== Maricopa-20 ===
General election results
Party	Candidate	Votes	%
Republican	Malcolm L. Lentz (incumbent)	1,369	57.67%
Democratic	Charles Christakis	1,005	42.33%
Total votes		2,374	100.00%
Republican hold			

=== Maricopa-21 ===
General election results
Party	Candidate	Votes	%
Republican	Emogene M. Jennings	1,495	51.82%
Democratic	Arthur S. Kininmonth	1,390	48.18%
Total votes		2,885	100.00%
Republican gain from Democratic			

=== Maricopa-22 ===
General election results
Party	Candidate	Votes	%
Republican	W. I. (Ike) Lowry (incumbent)	1,791	58.76%
Democratic	Alton D. (Slim) Anderson	1,257	41.24%
Total votes		3,048	100.00%
Republican hold			

=== Maricopa-23 ===
General election results
Party	Candidate	Votes	%
Democratic	Lillian Retzloff (incumbent)	1,781	55.17%
Republican	James R. Cross	1,447	44.83%
Total votes		3,228	100.00%
Democratic hold			

=== Maricopa-24 ===
General election results
Party	Candidate	Votes	%
Republican	Ruth Adams White (incumbent)	4,267	62.48%
Democratic	Al Moynahan	2,562	37.52%
Total votes		6,829	100.00%
Republican hold			

=== Maricopa-25 ===
General election results
Party	Candidate	Votes	%
Republican	Isabel Burgess	1,932	50.94%
Democratic	Milton J. Husky	1,861	49.06%
Total votes		3,793	100.00%
Republican gain from Democratic			

=== Maricopa-26 ===
General election results
Party	Candidate	Votes	%
Republican	David H. Campbell (incumbent)	4,428	61.19%
Democratic	Bernard (Barney) Blaine	2,809	38.81%
Total votes		7,237	100.00%
Republican hold			

=== Maricopa-27 ===
General election results
Party	Candidate	Votes	%
Democratic	Del Rogers (incumbent)	1,402	50.34%
Republican	Ruth C. Kuntz	1,383	49.66%
Total votes		2,785	100.00%
Democratic hold			

=== Maricopa-28 ===
General election results
Party	Candidate	Votes	%
Republican	Robert C. Forquer	1,774	53.73%
Democratic	Andrew L. Bettwy	1,528	46.27%
Total votes		3,302	100.00%
Republican hold			

=== Maricopa-29 ===
General election results
Party	Candidate	Votes	%
Democratic	John C. Hughes	1,769	51.51%
Republican	Clara S. Haberl	1,665	48.49%
Total votes		3,434	100.00%
Democratic gain from Republican			

=== Maricopa-30 ===
General election results
Party	Candidate	Votes	%
Republican	R. H. (Bob) Wallace	2,820	62.38%
Democratic	Byron H. Alexander, Sr.	1,701	37.62%
Total votes		4,521	100.00%
Republican hold			

=== Maricopa-31 ===
General election results
Party	Candidate	Votes	%
Republican	Arthur B. Schellenberg (incumbent)	3,334	64.60%
Democratic	David L. Jones	1,827	35.40%
Total votes		5,161	100.00%
Republican hold			

=== Maricopa-32 ===
General election results
Party	Candidate	Votes	%
Democratic	William J. Kamp	2,062	50.86%
Republican	L. W. Hacker	1,992	49.14%
Total votes		4,054	100.00%
Democratic hold			

=== Maricopa-33 ===
General election results
Party	Candidate	Votes	%
Democratic	Bill Stephens	3,960	55.36%
Republican	Barbara M. Greenway	3,193	44.64%
Total votes		7,153	100.00%
Democratic hold			

=== Maricopa-34 ===
General election results
Party	Candidate	Votes	%
Democratic	W. B. Barkley	2,378	62.30%
Republican	J. T. (Doc) Dungan	1,439	37.70%
Total votes		3,817	100.00%
Democratic hold			

=== Maricopa-35 ===
General election results
Party	Candidate	Votes	%
Democratic	Lewis B. Bramkamp	1,890	100.00%
Total votes		1,890	100.00%
Democratic hold			

=== Maricopa-36 ===
General election results
Party	Candidate	Votes	%
Democratic	S. Earl Pugh (incumbent)	3,379	100.00%
Total votes		3,379	100.00%
Democratic hold			

=== Maricopa-37 ===
General election results
Party	Candidate	Votes	%
Democratic	T. C. (Doc) Rhodes (incumbent)	2,176	100.00%
Total votes		2,176	100.00%
Democratic hold			

=== Mohave-1 ===
General election results
Party	Candidate	Votes	%
Democratic	J. J. Glancy	1,872	100.00%
Total votes		1,872	100.00%
Democratic hold			

=== Navajo-1 ===
General election results
Party	Candidate	Votes	%
Republican	Augusta T. Larson (incumbent)	1,843	58.66%
Democratic	William M. Huso	1,299	41.34%
Total votes		3,142	100.00%
Republican hold			

=== Navajo-2 ===
General election results
Party	Candidate	Votes	%
Democratic	Lee F. Dover (incumbent)	2,144	100.00%
Total votes		2,144	100.00%
Democratic hold			

=== Pima-1 ===
General election results
Party	Candidate	Votes	%
Democratic	Eaner T. Seaberg	1,747	100.00%
Total votes		1,747	100.00%
Democratic hold			

=== Pima-2 ===
General election results
Party	Candidate	Votes	%
Democratic	James N. Corbett Jr.	3,144	64.48%
Republican	Beth H. Carmack	1,732	35.52%
Total votes		4,876	100.00%
Democratic hold			

=== Pima-3 ===
General election results
Party	Candidate	Votes	%
Democratic	Etta Mae Hutcheson (incumbent)	1,232	100.00%
Total votes		1,232	100.00%
Democratic hold			

=== Pima-4 ===
General election results
Party	Candidate	Votes	%
Democratic	William M. Carson	3,033	100.00%
Total votes		3,033	100.00%
Democratic hold			

=== Pima-5 ===
General election results
Party	Candidate	Votes	%
Democratic	Dr. Thomas D. Fridena (incumbent)	1,244	100.00%
Total votes		1,244	100.00%
Democratic hold			

=== Pima-6 ===
General election results
Party	Candidate	Votes	%
Republican	Douglas S. Holsclaw (incumbent)	1,655	61.99%
Democratic	W. W. Akers	1,015	38.01%
Total votes		2,670	100.00%
Republican hold			

=== Pima-7 ===
General election results
Party	Candidate	Votes	%
Republican	Julliette C. Willis (incumbent)	2,346	57.78%
Democratic	Kathryn L. Woodward	1,714	42.22%
Total votes		4,060	100.00%
Republican hold			

=== Pima-8 ===
General election results
Party	Candidate	Votes	%
Republican	V. S. "John" Hostetter (incumbent)	2,126	63.35%
Democratic	Yona Alexandre	1,230	36.65%
Total votes		3,356	100.00%
Republican hold			

=== Pima-9 ===
General election results
Party	Candidate	Votes	%
Democratic	Marvin L. Burton	2,260	54.12%
Republican	Lem C. Shattuck	1,916	45.88%
Total votes		4,176	100.00%
Democratic hold			

=== Pima-10 ===
General election results
Party	Candidate	Votes	%
Republican	Alvin Wessler (incumbent)	3,553	60.57%
Democratic	Albert N. Hopper	2,313	39.43%
Total votes		5,866	100.00%
Republican hold			

=== Pima-11 ===
General election results
Party	Candidate	Votes	%
Democratic	James W. Carroll (incumbent)	2,679	50.79%
Republican	James B. Meigs Jr.	2,596	49.21%
Total votes		5,275	100.00%
Democratic hold			

=== Pima-12 ===
General election results
Party	Candidate	Votes	%
Republican	John H. Haugh (incumbent)	2,720	59.78%
Democratic	Robert K. (Bob) McQuade	1,830	40.22%
Total votes		4,550	100.00%
Republican hold			

=== Pima-13 ===
General election results
Party	Candidate	Votes	%
Republican	Keith Brown (incumbent)	1,990	57.27%
Democratic	Virgil A. Johnson	1,485	42.73%
Total votes		3,475	100.00%
Republican hold			

=== Pima-14 ===
General election results
Party	Candidate	Votes	%
Democratic	Frank G. Robles	1,860	100.00%
Total votes		1,860	100.00%
Democratic hold			

=== Pima-15 ===
General election results
Party	Candidate	Votes	%
Republican	W. G. "Bill" Bodell	1,655	53.66%
Democratic	Gary V. Covington	1,429	46.34%
Total votes		3,084	100.00%
Republican hold			

=== Pima-16 ===
General election results
Party	Candidate	Votes	%
Democratic	Harold L. Cook	2,867	59.32%
Republican	Thomas J. Rallis	1,966	40.68%
Total votes		4,833	100.00%
Democratic hold			

=== Pinal-1 ===
General election results
Party	Candidate	Votes	%
Democratic	Harry Bagnall (incumbent)	2,428	100.00%
Total votes		2,428	100.00%
Democratic hold			

=== Pinal-2 ===
General election results
Party	Candidate	Votes	%
Democratic	Frederick S. Smith (incumbent)	2,763	100.00%
Total votes		2,763	100.00%
Democratic hold			

=== Pinal-3 ===
General election results
Party	Candidate	Votes	%
Democratic	E. Blodwen Thode (incumbent)	3,034	100.00%
Total votes		3,034	100.00%
Democratic hold			

=== Santa Cruz-1 ===
General election results
Party	Candidate	Votes	%
Democratic	Robert Hathaway (incumbent)	2,255	100.00%
Total votes		2,255	100.00%
Democratic hold			

=== Yavapai-1 ===
General election results
Party	Candidate	Votes	%
Democratic	Mabel S. Ellis (incumbent)	1,728	54.07%
Republican	Robert K. Belt	1,468	45.93%
Total votes		3,196	100.00%
Democratic hold			

=== Yavapai-2 ===
General election results
Party	Candidate	Votes	%
Republican	Dick W. Martin (incumbent)	1,647	50.82%
Democratic	Joseph L. (Joe) Allen	1,594	49.18%
Total votes		3,241	100.00%
Republican hold			

=== Yavapai-3 ===
General election results
Party	Candidate	Votes	%
Democratic	Milton O. "Mo" Lindner (incumbent)	1,751	56.76%
Republican	Jesse W. Goddard	1,334	43.24%
Total votes		3,085	100.00%
Democratic hold			

=== Yuma-1 ===
General election results
Party	Candidate	Votes	%
Democratic	Robert L. (Bob) Klauer (incumbent)	1,115	58.07%
Republican	Robert S. Broussard	805	41.93%
Total votes		1,920	100.00%
Democratic hold			

=== Yuma-2 ===
General election results
Party	Candidate	Votes	%
Democratic	John C. Smith	4,368	100.00%
Total votes		4,368	100.00%
Democratic hold			

=== Yuma-3 ===
General election results
Party	Candidate	Votes	%
Democratic	Al Lindsey	1,826	53.08%
Republican	J. E. (Joe) Bush	1,614	46.92%
Total votes		3,440	100.00%
Democratic hold			
