= 25th Arizona State Legislature =

Session of the Arizona Legislature

←	24th	26th	→
- Arizona State Capitol (2014)

Overview
- Legislative body: Arizona State Legislature
- Jurisdiction: Arizona, United States
- Term: January 1, 1961 – December 31, 1962

Senate
- Members: 28
- Party control: Democrat (24–4)

House of Representatives
- Members: 80
- Party control: Democrat (52–28)

Sessions
- 1st: January 9 – March 24, 1961
- 2nd: January 8 – March 22, 1962

Special sessions
- 1st: July 17 – July 31, 1961

The 25th Arizona State Legislature, consisting of the Arizona State Senate and the Arizona House of Representatives, was constituted in Phoenix from January 1, 1961, to December 31, 1962, during the second of three terms of Paul Fannin's time as Governor of Arizona. The number of senators remained constant at two per county, totaling 28, and the members of the house of representatives also held steady at 80. The Republicans picked up three seats in the upper house, but the Democrats still had a 24–4 edge. In the House the Republicans picked up two seats, leaving the Democrats with a 52–28 edge.

== Sessions ==
The Legislature met for two regular sessions at the State Capitol in Phoenix. The first opened on January 9, 1961, and adjourned on March 24; while the second convened on January 8, 1962, and adjourned on March 22. There was a single Special Session, which convened on July 17, 1961, and adjourned sine die on July 31.

== State Senate ==
=== Members ===
The asterisk (*) denotes members of the previous Legislature who continued in office as members of this Legislature.

County	Senator	Party	Notes
Apache	Bert Colter	Democrat	
Apache	Albert F. Anderson	Republican	
Cochise	Dan S. Kitchel*	Democrat	
Cochise	A. R. Spikes*	Democrat	
Coconino	Robert W. Prochnow*	Democrat	
Coconino	Fred F. Udine*	Democrat	
Gila	Clarence L. Carpenter*	Democrat	
Gila	William A. Sullivan*	Democrat	
Graham	Darvil B. McBride	Democrat	
Graham	John Mickelson*	Democrat	
Greenlee	M. L. Sims*	Democrat	
Greenlee	Carl Gale*	Democrat	
Maricopa	Joe Haldiman Jr.	Democrat	
Maricopa	Evan Mecham	Republican	
Mohave	Thelma Bollinger*	Democrat	
Mohave	Robert Morrow*	Democrat	
Navajo	J. Morris Richards*	Democrat	
Navajo	Glenn Blansett*	Democrat	
Pima	David S. Wine*	Democrat	
Pima	Hiram S. (Hi) Corbet*	Republican	
Pinal	Charles S. Goff*	Democrat	
Pinal	Ben Arnold*	Democrat	
Santa Cruz	Frank A. Bennett	Democrat	
Santa Cruz	R. G. Michelena	Democrat	
Yavapai	David H. Palmer*	Democrat	
Yavapai	Sam Steiger	Republican	
Yuma	Harold C. Giss*	Democrat	
Yuma	R. H. Thompson*	Democrat	

== House of Representatives ==
=== Members ===
The asterisk (*) denotes members of the previous Legislature who continued in office as members of this Legislature.

County	Representative	Party	Notes
Apache	James S. Shreeve*	Democrat	
Cochise	W. L. (Tay) Cook*	Democrat	
Cochise	Clyde M. Dalton*	Democrat	
Cochise	James A. Elliott	Democrat	
Cochise	Andrew J. Gilbert*	Democrat	
Coconino	Thomas N. Knoles Jr.*	Democrat	
Coconino	Harold J. Scudder*	Democrat	
Gila	Nelson D. Breyton*	Democrat	
Gila	Louis B. Ellsworth Jr.	Democrat	
Gila	Edwynne C. (Polly) Rosenbaum	Democrat	
Graham	Milton Lines*	Democrat	
Graham	Gordon L. Hoopes	Democrat	
Greenlee	Tom W. Berry*	Democrat	
Greenlee	G. O. (Sonny) Biles*	Democrat	
Maricopa	Carl Austin*	Democrat	
Maricopa	W. B. Barkley*	Democrat	
Maricopa	Robert Brewer*	Republican	
Maricopa	Isabel Burgess	Republican	
Maricopa	Elmer T. Burson*	Republican	
Maricopa	Conrad James Carreon*	Democrat	
Maricopa	F. A. (Rocky) Crane*	Democrat	
Maricopa	Laron Waldo DeWitt*	Republican	
Maricopa	Geraldine F. Eliot*	Republican	
Maricopa	George W. Eubank	Republican	
Maricopa	Gilbert Gray	Democrat	
Maricopa	Merle E. Hays*	Democrat	
Maricopa	Priscilla H. Hays*	Republican	
Maricopa	F. A. (Jake) Higgins*	Republican	
Maricopa	J. D. Holmes	Democrat	
Maricopa	Marshall Humphrey*	Republican	
Maricopa	Robert H. Hutto	Democrat	
Maricopa	Elmer G. King*	Democrat	
Maricopa	Ralph W. Koch	Republican	
Maricopa	David B. Kret	Republican	
Maricopa	Gene B. McClellan*	Republican	
Maricopa	George W. Peck	Democrat	
Maricopa	Ruth Peck*	Republican	
Maricopa	William S. Porter	Republican	
Maricopa	S. L. Pugh	Democrat	
Maricopa	Don Reese*	Republican	
Maricopa	T. C. Rhodes*	Democrat	
Maricopa	L. Alton (Pat) Riggs	Democrat	
Maricopa	Archie C. Ryan	Democrat	
Maricopa	Arthur B. Schellenberg*	Republican	
Maricopa	Bill Stephens*	Democrat	
Maricopa	Bob Stump*	Democrat	
Maricopa	Martin P. Toscano*	Democrat	
Maricopa	Derek Van Dyke	Republican	
Maricopa	Wm. F. (Pat) Vipperman Jr.	Democrat	
Maricopa	Robert C. Wilcox	Republican	
Maricopa	John Wood	Republican	
Mohave	J. J. Glancy*	Democrat	
Navajo	Lee F. Dover*	Democrat	
Navajo	Augusta T. Larson*	Republican	
Pima	W. M. (Bill) Carson	Democrat	
Pima	Harold L. Cook*	Democrat	
Pima	Arnold Elias*	Democrat	
Pima	Thomas D. Fridena*	Democrat	
Pima	John H. Haugh*	Republican	
Pima	David G. Hawkins	Republican	
Pima	Douglas S. Holsclaw*	Republican	
Pima	Etta Mae Hutcheson*	Democrat	
Pima	John C. Jordan	Democrat	
Pima	Ray Martin*	Democrat	
Pima	Nicholas Traficanti	Republican	
Pima	Doris Varn	Republican	
Pima	Emmett S. (Bud) Walker	Democrat	
Pima	Thomas C. Webster	Republican	
Pima	Alvin Wessler*	Republican	
Pima	Joe D. Ybarra	Democrat	
Pinal	Charles Moody*	Democrat	
Pinal	Frederick S. Smith*	Democrat	
Pinal	E. Blodwen Thode*	Democrat	
Santa Cruz	Robert R. Hathaway*	Democrat	
Yavapai	Mabel S. Ellis*	Democrat	
Yavapai	M. A. Lindner*	Democrat	
Yavapai	Raymond Rowland	Republican	
Yuma	Clara Osborne Botzum	Democrat	
Yuma	Robert L. Klauer*	Democrat	
Yuma	Cecil D. Miller	Democrat	
