= 1964 Arizona House of Representatives election =

1964 Arizona House of Representatives elections
- November 3, 1964

All 80 seats in the Arizona House 41 seats needed for a majority
| | Majority party | Minority party |
|---|---|---|
| Party | Democratic | Republican |
| Last election | 48 | 32 |
| Seats after | 45 | 35 |
| Seat change | ▼3 | ▲3 |
Speaker before election
W. B. Barkley
Democrat
Elected Speaker
Andrew J. Gilbert
Democrat

The 1964 Arizona House of Representatives elections were held on November 3, 1964. Voters elected members of the Arizona House of Representatives in all 80 of the state's House districts to serve a two-year term. The elections coincided with the elections for other offices, including Governor, U.S. Senate, U.S. House, and State Senate. Primary elections were held on September 8, 1964.

Prior to the elections, the Democrats held a majority of 48 seats over the Republicans' 32 seats.

Following the elections, Democrats maintained control of the chamber with 45 Democrats to 35 Republicans, a net gain of three seats for Republicans.

The newly elected members served in the 27th Arizona State Legislature, during which Democrat Andrew J. Gilbert was chosen as Speaker of the Arizona House. (Note: Gilbert was elected as Speaker for the 27th legislature, defeating Representative Hoopes, who was also nominated for Speaker. The vote tally for Speaker was: Gilbert-53 votes to Hoopes-26 votes. Representative Harold L. Cook was absent from the Speaker vote.)

== Summary of Results ==
| County | Subdistrict | Incumbent | Party | Elected Representative | Outcome |
|---|---|---|---|---|---|
| Apache | Apache-1 | Jack A. Brown | Dem | Jack A. Brown | Dem Hold |
| Cochise | Cochise-1 | A. J. (Jack) Gilbert | Dem | A. J. (Jack) Gilbert | Dem Hold |
| Cochise | Cochise-2 | James A. "Jim" Elliott | Dem | James A. "Jim" Elliott | Dem Hold |
| Cochise | Cochise-3 | Fred Burke (Note: Representative Burke ran without party designation in the general election.) | Dem | W. L. (Tay) Cook | Dem Hold |
| Coconino | Coconino-1 | Dr. Charles Sechrist (Note: Democrat Dr. Carroll Clark Creighton died on election day, November 6, 1962. He would have represented Coconino District 1. He was replaced by Democrat Dr. Charles W. Sechrist who took the oath of office January 14, 1963 (Journal of the House of Representatives, 26th Legislature, 1st Regular Session, 1963, pp. 9-10).) | Dem | Dr. Charles Sechrist (Note: Democrat Harold L. Huffer was appointed on September 13, 1965 to fill the vacancy created by the death of Democratic Representative Charles W. Sechrist, District 1, Coconino County, Arizona.) | Dem Hold |
| Coconino | Coconino-2 | Harold J. Scudder | Dem | Harold J. Scudder | Dem Hold |
| Gila | Gila-1 | Dr. Nelson D. Brayton | Dem | Charles A. "Bert" Horne | Dem Hold |
| Gila | Gila-2 | Polly Rosenbaum | Dem | Polly Rosenbaum | Dem Hold |
| Graham | Graham-1 | Gordon L. Hoopes | Dem | Gordon L. Hoopes | Dem Hold |
| Greenlee | Greenlee-1 | G. O. (Sonny) Biles | Dem | G. O. (Sonny) Biles | Dem Hold |
| Maricopa | Maricopa-1 | Marshall Humphrey | Rep | Stan Turley | Rep Hold |
| Maricopa | Maricopa-2 | William S. Porter | Rep | William S. Porter | Rep Hold |
| Maricopa | Maricopa-3 | L. Waldo DeWitt | Rep | D. Delos Ellsworth | Rep Hold |
| Maricopa | Maricopa-4 | James E. Shelley | Rep | James E. Shelley | Rep Hold |
| Maricopa | Maricopa-5 | Jim Holley | Rep | Jim Holley | Rep Hold |
| Maricopa | Maricopa-6 | Elmer (King) King | Dem | David M. Valenzuela | Dem Hold |
| Maricopa | Maricopa-7 | Cloves C. Campbell | Dem | Cloves C. Campbell | Dem Hold |
| Maricopa | Maricopa-8 | Bob Stump | Dem | Bob Stump | Dem Hold |
| Maricopa | Maricopa-9 | Leon Thompson | Dem | Leon Thompson | Dem Hold |
| Maricopa | Maricopa-10 | J. D. Holmes | Dem | Leonard M. Calderon Jr. | Dem Hold |
| Maricopa | Maricopa-11 | Martin P. Toscano | Dem | LaVerne E. Welker | Dem Hold |
| Maricopa | Maricopa-12 | David B. Kret | Rep | David B. Kret | Rep Hold |
| Maricopa | Maricopa-13 | William C. Attaway Jr. | Rep | Frank J. Kelley | Rep Hold |
| Maricopa | Maricopa-14 | William F. Vipperman | Dem | William F. Vipperman | Dem Hold |
| Maricopa | Maricopa-15 | Archie C. Ryan | Dem | Archie C. Ryan | Dem Hold |
| Maricopa | Maricopa-16 | Gerry (Mrs. William C.) Eliot | Rep | Elizabeth Adams Rockwell | Rep Hold |
| Maricopa | Maricopa-17 | Robert Hutto | Dem | Robert Hutto | Dem Hold |
| Maricopa | Maricopa-18 | S. Earl Pugh | Dem | A. E. Kluender | Rep Gain |
| Maricopa | Maricopa-19 | Robert Brewer | Rep | Robert Brewer | Rep Hold |
| Maricopa | Maricopa-20 | Derek Van Dyke | Rep | Harry Bandouveris | Rep Hold |
| Maricopa | Maricopa-21 | George W. Eubank | Rep | Chet Goldberg Jr. | Rep Hold |
| Maricopa | Maricopa-22 | Walter P. Sherrill | Rep | Walter P. Sherrill | Rep Hold |
| Maricopa | Maricopa-23 | Isabel Burgess | Rep | Isabel Burgess | Rep Hold |
| Maricopa | Maricopa-24 | Elmer T. Burson | Rep | Ruth Adams | Rep Hold |
| Maricopa | Maricopa-25 | John Pritzlaff Jr. | Rep | John Pritzlaff Jr. | Rep Hold |
| Maricopa | Maricopa-26 | Don Reese | Rep | Sam Flake | Rep Hold |
| Maricopa | Maricopa-27 | F. A. (Jake) Higgins | Rep | Burton S. Barr | Rep Hold |
| Maricopa | Maricopa-28 | Ruth Peck | Rep | Ruth Peck | Rep Hold |
| Maricopa | Maricopa-29 | Al Frantz | Dem | Al Frantz | Dem Hold |
| Maricopa | Maricopa-30 | James Young | Dem | James Young | Dem Hold |
| Maricopa | Maricopa-31 | W. B. Barkley | Dem | Harold W. Smith | Dem Hold |
| Maricopa | Maricopa-32 | John Vanlandingham | Dem | M. C. Plummer | Dem Hold |
| Maricopa | Maricopa-33 | Oscar Henry | Dem | Chris T. Johnson | Rep Gain |
| Maricopa | Maricopa-34 | Priscilla Hays | Rep | Priscilla Hays | Rep Hold |
| Maricopa | Maricopa-35 | Bob Wilcox | Rep | Bob Wilcox | Rep Hold |
| Maricopa | Maricopa-36 | R. Larry Oldham | Rep | R. Larry Oldham | Rep Hold |
| Maricopa | Maricopa-37 | Davidson Jenks | Rep | Davidson Jenks | Rep Hold |
| Maricopa | Maricopa-38 | M. J. (Buck) Brown | Dem | M. J. (Buck) Brown | Dem Hold |
| Maricopa | Maricopa-39 | Ray A. Goetze | Rep | Ray A. Goetze | Rep Hold |
| Maricopa | Maricopa-40 | T. C. (Doc) Rhodes | Dem | T. C. (Doc) Rhodes | Dem Hold |
| Mohave | Mohave-1 | J. J. Glancy | Dem | Kent Smith | Dem Hold |
| Navajo | Navajo-1 | Frank L. Crosby | Dem | Frank L. Crosby | Dem Hold |
| Navajo | Navajo-2 | Clay B. Simer | Dem | Clay B. Simer | Dem Hold |
| Pima | Pima-1 | E. S. (Bud) Walker | Dem | E. S. (Bud) Walker | Dem Hold |
| Pima | Pima-2 | Tony Carrillo | Dem | Tony Carrillo | Dem Hold |
| Pima | Pima-3 | Etta Mae Hutcheson | Dem | Etta Mae Hutcheson | Dem Hold |
| Pima | Pima-4 | Forrest B. Pearce | Dem | Forrest B. Pearce | Dem Hold |
| Pima | Pima-5 | Evo J. DeConcini | Dem | Dr. Thomas D. Fridena | Dem Hold |
| Pima | Pima-6 | Douglas S. Holsclaw | Rep | Douglas S. Holsclaw | Rep Hold |
| Pima | Pima-7 | Doris R. Varn | Rep | Doris R. Varn | Rep Hold |
| Pima | Pima-8 | David G. Hawkins | Rep | Thomas G. Beaham | Rep Hold |
| Pima | Pima-9 | Richard J. (Dick) Herbert | Dem | Neal Justin | Dem Hold |
| Pima | Pima-10 | Alvin Henry Wessler | Rep | William C. Jacquin | Rep Hold |
| Pima | Pima-11 | Ray Martin | Dem | Ray Martin | Dem Hold |
| Pima | Pima-12 | John H. Haugh | Rep | John H. Haugh | Rep Hold |
| Pima | Pima-13 | Thomas C. Webster | Rep | Scott Alexander | Rep Hold |
| Pima | Pima-14 | Joe D. Ybarra | Dem | Joe D. Ybarra | Dem Hold |
| Pima | Pima-15 | Edward M. Chambers | Rep | William A. "Tony" Buehl | Rep Hold |
| Pima | Pima-16 | Harold Cook | Dem | Harold Cook (Note: Democrat Sam Lena was sworn-in on January 14, 1965 to fill the vacancy of Democratic Representative Harold L. Cook, District 16, Pima County, Arizona.) | Dem Hold |
| Pima | Pima-17 | Sandy Bowling | Dem | Sandy Bowling | Dem Hold |
| Pinal | Pinal-1 | Charles Moody | Dem | John C. Felix | Dem Hold |
| Pinal | Pinal-2 | Frederick S. Smith | Dem | Frederick S. Smith | Dem Hold |
| Pinal | Pinal-3 | Polly Getzwiller | Dem | Polly Getzwiller | Dem Hold |
| Santa Cruz | Santa Cruz-1 | Robert R. (Bob) Hathaway | Dem | Jesse W. Allen | Rep Gain |
| Yavapai | Yavapai-1 | Mabel S. Ellis | Dem | Gladys Gardner | Rep Gain |
| Yavapai | Yavapai-2 | Boyd Tenney | Rep | William D. (Bill) Lyman | Rep Hold |
| Yavapai | Yavapai-3 | Frank B. Ogden | Rep | Leo Sullivan | Dem Gain |
| Yuma | Yuma-1 | M. G. (Pop) Miniken | Dem | M. G. (Pop) Miniken | Dem Hold |
| Yuma | Yuma-2 | Charles A. Johnson | Dem | Charles A. Johnson | Dem Hold |
| Yuma | Yuma-3 | C. L. Slane | Dem | C. L. Slane | Dem Hold |

== Detailed Results ==
=== Apache-1 ===
General election results
| Party | Candidate | Votes | % |
|---|---|---|---|
| Democratic | Jack A. Brown (incumbent) | 2,811 | 100.00% |
| Total votes | | 2,811 | 100.00% |
| Democratic hold | | | |

=== Cochise-1 ===
General election results
| Party | Candidate | Votes | % |
|---|---|---|---|
| Democratic | A. J. (Jack) Gilbert (incumbent) | 4,177 | 100.00% |
| Total votes | | 4,177 | 100.00% |
| Democratic hold | | | |

=== Cochise-2 ===
General election results
| Party | Candidate | Votes | % |
|---|---|---|---|
| Democratic | James A. "Jim" Elliott (incumbent) | 3,688 | 100.00% |
| Total votes | | 3,688 | 100.00% |
| Democratic hold | | | |

=== Cochise-3 ===
General election results
| Party | Candidate | Votes | % |
|---|---|---|---|
| Democratic | W. L. (Tay) Cook | 3,191 | 56.22% |
| Without Party Designation | Fred Burke (incumbent) | 2,485 | 43.78% |
| Total votes | | 5,676 | 100.00% |
| Democratic hold | | | |

=== Coconino-1 ===
General election results
| Party | Candidate | Votes | % |
|---|---|---|---|
| Democratic | Dr. Charles Sechrist | 3,947 | 100.00% |
| Total votes | | 3,947 | 100.00% |
| Democratic hold | | | |

=== Coconino-2 ===
General election results
| Party | Candidate | Votes | % |
|---|---|---|---|
| Democratic | Harold J. Scudder (incumbent) | 3,119 | 100.00% |
| Total votes | | 3,119 | 100.00% |
| Democratic hold | | | |

=== Gila-1 ===
General election results
| Party | Candidate | Votes | % |
|---|---|---|---|
| Democratic | Charles A. "Bert" Horne | 3,434 | 70.53% |
| Republican | Doris M. Sturgis | 1,435 | 29.47% |
| Total votes | | 4,869 | 100.00% |
| Democratic hold | | | |

=== Gila-2 ===
General election results
| Party | Candidate | Votes | % |
|---|---|---|---|
| Democratic | Polly Rosenbaum (incumbent) | 4,477 | 100.00% |
| Total votes | | 4,477 | 100.00% |
| Democratic hold | | | |

=== Graham-1 ===
General election results
| Party | Candidate | Votes | % |
|---|---|---|---|
| Democratic | Gordon L. Hoopes (incumbent) | 3,076 | 56.87% |
| Republican | Arden Palmer | 2,333 | 43.13% |
| Total votes | | 5,409 | 100.00% |
| Democratic hold | | | |

=== Greenlee-1 ===
General election results
| Party | Candidate | Votes | % |
|---|---|---|---|
| Democratic | G. O. (Sonny) Biles (incumbent) | 3,711 | 100.00% |
| Total votes | | 3,711 | 100.00% |
| Democratic hold | | | |

=== Maricopa-1 ===
General election results
| Party | Candidate | Votes | % |
|---|---|---|---|
| Republican | Stan Turley | 4,460 | 55.36% |
| Democratic | Ed Ellsworth | 3,597 | 44.64% |
| Total votes | | 8,057 | 100.00% |
| Republican hold | | | |

=== Maricopa-2 ===
General election results
| Party | Candidate | Votes | % |
|---|---|---|---|
| Republican | William S. Porter (incumbent) | 3,965 | 60.93% |
| Democratic | Vernon Hathcock | 2,543 | 39.07% |
| Total votes | | 6,508 | 100.00% |
| Republican hold | | | |

=== Maricopa-3 ===
General election results
| Party | Candidate | Votes | % |
|---|---|---|---|
| Republican | D. Delos Ellsworth | 4,274 | 61.70% |
| Democratic | William J. Skousen | 2,653 | 38.30% |
| Total votes | | 6,927 | 100.00% |
| Republican hold | | | |

=== Maricopa-4 ===
General election results
| Party | Candidate | Votes | % |
|---|---|---|---|
| Republican | James E. Shelley (incumbent) | 3,674 | 50.91% |
| Democratic | John H. Tait | 3,543 | 49.09% |
| Total votes | | 7,217 | 100.00% |
| Republican hold | | | |

=== Maricopa-5 ===
General election results
| Party | Candidate | Votes | % |
|---|---|---|---|
| Republican | Jim Holley (incumbent) | 4,304 | 50.45% |
| Democratic | Tom Swann | 4,228 | 49.55% |
| Total votes | | 8,532 | 100.00% |
| Republican hold | | | |

=== Maricopa-6 ===
General election results
| Party | Candidate | Votes | % |
|---|---|---|---|
| Democratic | David M. Valenzuela | 4,080 | 64.68% |
| Republican | Herb Hall | 2,228 | 35.32% |
| Total votes | | 6,308 | 100.00% |
| Democratic hold | | | |

=== Maricopa-7 ===
General election results
| Party | Candidate | Votes | % |
|---|---|---|---|
| Democratic | Cloves C. Campbell (incumbent) | 4,724 | 80.93% |
| Republican | Charles J. Fuhrman | 1,113 | 19.07% |
| Total votes | | 5,837 | 100.00% |
| Democratic hold | | | |

=== Maricopa-8 ===
General election results
| Party | Candidate | Votes | % |
|---|---|---|---|
| Democratic | Bob Stump (incumbent) | 4,135 | 77.15% |
| Republican | William A. Herron | 1,225 | 22.85% |
| Total votes | | 5,360 | 100.00% |
| Democratic hold | | | |

=== Maricopa-9 ===
General election results
| Party | Candidate | Votes | % |
|---|---|---|---|
| Democratic | Leon Thompson (incumbent) | 4,242 | 100.00% |
| Total votes | | 4,242 | 100.00% |
| Democratic hold | | | |

=== Maricopa-10 ===
General election results
| Party | Candidate | Votes | % |
|---|---|---|---|
| Democratic | Leonard M. Calderon Jr. | 4,337 | 100.00% |
| Total votes | | 4,337 | 100.00% |
| Democratic hold | | | |

=== Maricopa-11 ===
General election results
| Party | Candidate | Votes | % |
|---|---|---|---|
| Democratic | LaVerne E. Welker | 3,307 | 56.90% |
| Republican | Ray C. Gardiner | 2,505 | 43.10% |
| Total votes | | 5,812 | 100.00% |
| Democratic hold | | | |

=== Maricopa-12 ===
General election results
| Party | Candidate | Votes | % |
|---|---|---|---|
| Republican | David B. Kret (incumbent) | 4,432 | 57.93% |
| Democratic | James Cleckner | 3,219 | 42.07% |
| Total votes | | 7,651 | 100.00% |
| Republican hold | | | |

=== Maricopa-13 ===
General election results
| Party | Candidate | Votes | % |
|---|---|---|---|
| Republican | Frank J. Kelley | 2,703 | 53.81% |
| Democratic | John A. Hellman | 2,320 | 46.19% |
| Total votes | | 5,023 | 100.00% |
| Republican hold | | | |

=== Maricopa-14 ===
General election results
| Party | Candidate | Votes | % |
|---|---|---|---|
| Democratic | William F. Vipperman (incumbent) | 2,798 | 50.56% |
| Republican | D. Lee Jones | 2,736 | 49.44% |
| Total votes | | 5,534 | 100.00% |
| Democratic hold | | | |

=== Maricopa-15 ===
General election results
| Party | Candidate | Votes | % |
|---|---|---|---|
| Democratic | Archie Ryan (incumbent) | 2,949 | 63.64% |
| Republican | Donald E. Butler | 1,685 | 36.36% |
| Total votes | | 4,634 | 100.00% |
| Democratic hold | | | |

=== Maricopa-16 ===
General election results
| Party | Candidate | Votes | % |
|---|---|---|---|
| Republican | Elizabeth Adams Rockwell | 2,087 | 50.50% |
| Democratic | Lewis R. Burch | 2,046 | 49.50% |
| Total votes | | 4,133 | 100.00% |
| Republican hold | | | |

=== Maricopa-17 ===
General election results
| Party | Candidate | Votes | % |
|---|---|---|---|
| Democratic | Robert Hutto (incumbent) | 2,949 | 62.96% |
| Republican | Dorothy Theilkas | 1,735 | 37.04% |
| Total votes | | 4,684 | 100.00% |
| Democratic hold | | | |

=== Maricopa-18 ===
General election results
| Party | Candidate | Votes | % |
|---|---|---|---|
| Republican | A. E. Kluender | 5,001 | 51.64% |
| Democratic | S. Earl Pugh (incumbent) | 4,684 | 48.36% |
| Total votes | | 9,685 | 100.00% |
| Republican gain from Democratic | | | |

=== Maricopa-19 ===
General election results
| Party | Candidate | Votes | % |
|---|---|---|---|
| Republican | Robert Brewer (incumbent) | 2,707 | 52.38% |
| Democratic | Donald T. Higgins | 2,461 | 47.62% |
| Total votes | | 5,168 | 100.00% |
| Republican hold | | | |

=== Maricopa-20 ===
General election results
| Party | Candidate | Votes | % |
|---|---|---|---|
| Republican | Harry Bandouveris | 3,112 | 61.45% |
| Democratic | Dennis D. Naughton | 1,952 | 38.55% |
| Total votes | | 5,064 | 100.00% |
| Republican hold | | | |

=== Maricopa-21 ===
General election results
| Party | Candidate | Votes | % |
|---|---|---|---|
| Republican | Chet Goldberg Jr. | 2,908 | 56.40% |
| Democratic | William E. Swineford | 2,248 | 43.60% |
| Total votes | | 5,156 | 100.00% |
| Republican hold | | | |

=== Maricopa-22 ===
General election results
| Party | Candidate | Votes | % |
|---|---|---|---|
| Republican | Walter P. Sherrill (incumbent) | 3,203 | 56.92% |
| Democratic | Hilda Harrison | 2,424 | 43.08% |
| Total votes | | 5,627 | 100.00% |
| Republican hold | | | |

=== Maricopa-23 ===
General election results
| Party | Candidate | Votes | % |
|---|---|---|---|
| Republican | Isabel Burgess (incumbent) | 4,607 | 100.00% |
| Total votes | | 4,607 | 100.00% |
| Republican hold | | | |

=== Maricopa-24 ===
General election results
| Party | Candidate | Votes | % |
|---|---|---|---|
| Republican | Ruth Adams | 3,564 | 63.05% |
| Democratic | Art Hargrave | 2,089 | 36.95% |
| Total votes | | 5,653 | 100.00% |
| Republican hold | | | |

=== Maricopa-25 ===
General election results
| Party | Candidate | Votes | % |
|---|---|---|---|
| Republican | John Pritzlaff Jr. (incumbent) | 4,014 | 71.17% |
| Democratic | John K. Anderson | 1,626 | 28.83% |
| Total votes | | 5,640 | 100.00% |
| Republican hold | | | |

=== Maricopa-26 ===
General election results
| Party | Candidate | Votes | % |
|---|---|---|---|
| Republican | Sam Flake | 6,281 | 67.26% |
| Democratic | Theodore (Tim) McDaniel | 3,058 | 32.74% |
| Total votes | | 9,339 | 100.00% |
| Republican hold | | | |

=== Maricopa-27 ===
General election results
| Party | Candidate | Votes | % |
|---|---|---|---|
| Republican | Burton S. Barr | 4,305 | 66.72% |
| Democratic | James I. Dugan Jr. | 2,147 | 33.28% |
| Total votes | | 6,452 | 100.00% |
| Republican hold | | | |

=== Maricopa-28 ===
General election results
| Party | Candidate | Votes | % |
|---|---|---|---|
| Republican | Ruth Peck (incumbent) | 3,583 | 65.23% |
| Democratic | Elliott Kaufman | 1,910 | 34.77% |
| Total votes | | 5,493 | 100.00% |
| Republican hold | | | |

=== Maricopa-29 ===
General election results
| Party | Candidate | Votes | % |
|---|---|---|---|
| Democratic | Al Frantz (incumbent) | 3,132 | 55.42% |
| Republican | Cal Vander Molen | 2,519 | 44.58% |
| Total votes | | 5,651 | 100.00% |
| Democratic hold | | | |

=== Maricopa-30 ===
General election results
| Party | Candidate | Votes | % |
|---|---|---|---|
| Democratic | James Young (incumbent) | 3,273 | 55.68% |
| Republican | Joe Benites | 2,605 | 44.32% |
| Total votes | | 5,878 | 100.00% |
| Democratic hold | | | |

=== Maricopa-31 ===
General election results
| Party | Candidate | Votes | % |
|---|---|---|---|
| Democratic | Harold W. Smith | 3,519 | 53.04% |
| Republican | John Hedberg | 3,115 | 46.96% |
| Total votes | | 6,634 | 100.00% |
| Democratic hold | | | |

=== Maricopa-32 ===
General election results
| Party | Candidate | Votes | % |
|---|---|---|---|
| Democratic | M. C. Plummer | 4,068 | 50.85% |
| Republican | Gordon H. Gray | 3,932 | 49.15% |
| Total votes | | 8,000 | 100.00% |
| Democratic hold | | | |

=== Maricopa-33 ===
General election results
| Party | Candidate | Votes | % |
|---|---|---|---|
| Republican | Chris T. Johnson | 2,962 | 50.14% |
| Democratic | Oscar Henry (incumbent) | 2,946 | 49.86% |
| Total votes | | 5,908 | 100.00% |
| Republican gain from Democratic | | | |

=== Maricopa-34 ===
General election results
| Party | Candidate | Votes | % |
|---|---|---|---|
| Republican | Priscilla Hays (incumbent) | 3,617 | 61.73% |
| Democratic | Les Arie | 2,242 | 38.27% |
| Total votes | | 5,859 | 100.00% |
| Republican hold | | | |

=== Maricopa-35 ===
General election results
| Party | Candidate | Votes | % |
|---|---|---|---|
| Republican | Bob Wilcox (incumbent) | 3,880 | 65.40% |
| Democratic | Daniel H. Schwartz | 2,053 | 34.60% |
| Total votes | | 5,933 | 100.00% |
| Republican hold | | | |

=== Maricopa-36 ===
General election results
| Party | Candidate | Votes | % |
|---|---|---|---|
| Republican | R. Larry Oldham (incumbent) | 3,616 | 57.01% |
| Democratic | John C. Byrd Jr. | 2,727 | 42.99% |
| Total votes | | 6,343 | 100.00% |
| Republican hold | | | |

=== Maricopa-37 ===
General election results
| Party | Candidate | Votes | % |
|---|---|---|---|
| Republican | Davidson Jenks (incumbent) | 4,464 | 53.69% |
| Democratic | Leonard J. Grube | 3,851 | 46.31% |
| Total votes | | 8,315 | 100.00% |
| Republican hold | | | |

=== Maricopa-38 ===
General election results
| Party | Candidate | Votes | % |
|---|---|---|---|
| Democratic | M. J. (Buck) Brown (incumbent) | 3,675 | 55.55% |
| Republican | Bruce R. LaForce | 2,941 | 44.45% |
| Total votes | | 6,616 | 100.00% |
| Democratic hold | | | |

=== Maricopa-39 ===
General election results
| Party | Candidate | Votes | % |
|---|---|---|---|
| Republican | Ray A. Goetze (incumbent) | 4,601 | 63.07% |
| Democratic | Roy W. Litzen | 2,694 | 36.93% |
| Total votes | | 7,295 | 100.00% |
| Republican hold | | | |

=== Maricopa-40 ===
General election results
| Party | Candidate | Votes | % |
|---|---|---|---|
| Democratic | T. C. (Doc) Rhodes (incumbent) | 3,510 | 59.28% |
| Republican | Bob Lanford | 2,411 | 40.72% |
| Total votes | | 5,921 | 100.00% |
| Democratic hold | | | |

=== Mohave-1 ===
General election results
| Party | Candidate | Votes | % |
|---|---|---|---|
| Democratic | Kent Smith | 2,438 | 59.38% |
| Republican | Wilma Brummett | 1,668 | 40.62% |
| Total votes | | 4,106 | 100.00% |
| Democratic hold | | | |

=== Navajo-1 ===
General election results
| Party | Candidate | Votes | % |
|---|---|---|---|
| Democratic | Frank L. Crosby (incumbent) | 4,182 | 100.00% |
| Total votes | | 4,182 | 100.00% |
| Democratic hold | | | |

=== Navajo-2 ===
General election results
| Party | Candidate | Votes | % |
|---|---|---|---|
| Democratic | Clay B. Simer (incumbent) | 2,946 | 100.00% |
| Total votes | | 2,946 | 100.00% |
| Democratic hold | | | |

=== Pima-1 ===
General election results
| Party | Candidate | Votes | % |
|---|---|---|---|
| Democratic | E. S. (Bud) Walker (incumbent) | 2,350 | 100.00% |
| Total votes | | 2,350 | 100.00% |
| Democratic hold | | | |

=== Pima-2 ===
General election results
| Party | Candidate | Votes | % |
|---|---|---|---|
| Democratic | Tony Carrillo (incumbent) | 4,375 | 65.37% |
| Republican | Ralph Curtis | 2,318 | 34.63% |
| Total votes | | 6,693 | 100.00% |
| Democratic hold | | | |

=== Pima-3 ===
General election results
| Party | Candidate | Votes | % |
|---|---|---|---|
| Democratic | Etta Mae Hutcheson (incumbent) | 3,259 | 100.00% |
| Total votes | | 3,259 | 100.00% |
| Democratic hold | | | |

=== Pima-4 ===
General election results
| Party | Candidate | Votes | % |
|---|---|---|---|
| Democratic | Forrest B. Pearce (incumbent) | 3,713 | 64.56% |
| Republican | Jim Mielke | 2,038 | 35.44% |
| Total votes | | 5,751 | 100.00% |
| Democratic hold | | | |

=== Pima-5 ===
General election results
| Party | Candidate | Votes | % |
|---|---|---|---|
| Democratic | Dr. Thomas D. Fridena | 2,819 | 63.81% |
| Republican | Paul A. Smith | 1,599 | 36.19% |
| Total votes | | 4,418 | 100.00% |
| Democratic hold | | | |

=== Pima-6 ===
General election results
| Party | Candidate | Votes | % |
|---|---|---|---|
| Republican | Douglas S. Holsclaw (incumbent) | 2,824 | 59.53% |
| Democratic | Terry F. Concannon | 1,920 | 40.47% |
| Total votes | | 4,744 | 100.00% |
| Republican hold | | | |

=== Pima-7 ===
General election results
| Party | Candidate | Votes | % |
|---|---|---|---|
| Republican | Doris R. Varn (incumbent) | 2,748 | 53.47% |
| Democratic | Tom Flaherty | 2,391 | 46.53% |
| Total votes | | 5,139 | 100.00% |
| Republican hold | | | |

=== Pima-8 ===
General election results
| Party | Candidate | Votes | % |
|---|---|---|---|
| Republican | Thomas G. Beaham | 2,735 | 54.47% |
| Democratic | Margaret B. Wisdom | 2,286 | 45.53% |
| Total votes | | 5,021 | 100.00% |
| Republican hold | | | |

=== Pima-9 ===
General election results
| Party | Candidate | Votes | % |
|---|---|---|---|
| Democratic | Neal Justin | 3,752 | 61.92% |
| Republican | Paul David Weisenborn | 2,307 | 38.08% |
| Total votes | | 6,059 | 100.00% |
| Democratic hold | | | |

=== Pima-10 ===
General election results
| Party | Candidate | Votes | % |
|---|---|---|---|
| Republican | William C. Jacquin | 3,375 | 56.85% |
| Democratic | Porter W. Long | 2,562 | 43.15% |
| Total votes | | 5,937 | 100.00% |
| Republican hold | | | |

=== Pima-11 ===
General election results
| Party | Candidate | Votes | % |
|---|---|---|---|
| Democratic | Ray Martin (incumbent) | 2,975 | 57.81% |
| Republican | Albert C. Williams | 2,171 | 42.19% |
| Total votes | | 5,146 | 100.00% |
| Democratic hold | | | |

=== Pima-12 ===
General election results
| Party | Candidate | Votes | % |
|---|---|---|---|
| Republican | John H. Haugh (incumbent) | 4,597 | 100.00% |
| Total votes | | 4,597 | 100.00% |
| Republican hold | | | |

=== Pima-13 ===
General election results
| Party | Candidate | Votes | % |
|---|---|---|---|
| Republican | Scott Alexander | 5,083 | 56.11% |
| Democratic | James L. "Jimmy" Kennedy | 3,976 | 43.89% |
| Total votes | | 9,059 | 100.00% |
| Republican hold | | | |

=== Pima-14 ===
General election results
| Party | Candidate | Votes | % |
|---|---|---|---|
| Democratic | Joe D. Ybarra (incumbent) | 4,216 | 74.69% |
| Republican | James R. Grainger | 1,429 | 25.31% |
| Total votes | | 5,645 | 100.00% |
| Democratic hold | | | |

=== Pima-15 ===
General election results
| Party | Candidate | Votes | % |
|---|---|---|---|
| Republican | William A. "Tony" Buehl | 3,155 | 51.78% |
| Democratic | Joe Gulaskey | 2,938 | 48.22% |
| Total votes | | 6,093 | 100.00% |
| Republican hold | | | |

=== Pima-16 ===
General election results
| Party | Candidate | Votes | % |
|---|---|---|---|
| Democratic | Harold Cook (incumbent) | 3,819 | 69.66% |
| Republican | Verone Ferguson Grim | 1,663 | 30.34% |
| Total votes | | 5,482 | 100.00% |
| Democratic hold | | | |

=== Pima-17 ===
General election results
| Party | Candidate | Votes | % |
|---|---|---|---|
| Democratic | Sandy Bowling (incumbent) | 3,147 | 53.84% |
| Republican | Ernest Garfield | 2,698 | 46.16% |
| Total votes | | 5,845 | 100.00% |
| Democratic hold | | | |

=== Pinal-1 ===
General election results
| Party | Candidate | Votes | % |
|---|---|---|---|
| Democratic | John C. Felix | 3,281 | 60.76% |
| Republican | William Craig Haus | 2,119 | 39.24% |
| Total votes | | 5,400 | 100.00% |
| Democratic hold | | | |

=== Pinal-2 ===
General election results
| Party | Candidate | Votes | % |
|---|---|---|---|
| Democratic | Frederick S. Smith (incumbent) | 4,581 | 100.00% |
| Total votes | | 4,581 | 100.00% |
| Democratic hold | | | |

=== Pinal-3 ===
General election results
| Party | Candidate | Votes | % |
|---|---|---|---|
| Democratic | Polly Getzwiller (incumbent) | 4,375 | 100.00% |
| Total votes | | 4,375 | 100.00% |
| Democratic hold | | | |

=== Santa Cruz-1 ===
General election results
| Party | Candidate | Votes | % |
|---|---|---|---|
| Republican | Jesse W. Allen | 1,846 | 54.33% |
| Democratic | Joseph Saavedra | 1,552 | 45.67% |
| Total votes | | 3,398 | 100.00% |
| Republican gain from Democratic | | | |

=== Yavapai-1 ===
General election results
| Party | Candidate | Votes | % |
|---|---|---|---|
| Republican | Gladys Gardner | 2,143 | 50.25% |
| Democratic | Mabel S. Ellis (incumbent) | 2,122 | 49.75% |
| Total votes | | 4,265 | 100.00% |
| Republican gain from Democratic | | | |

=== Yavapai-2 ===
General election results
| Party | Candidate | Votes | % |
|---|---|---|---|
| Republican | William D. (Bill) Lyman | 2,563 | 60.69% |
| Democratic | Merle L. Farmer | 1,660 | 39.31% |
| Total votes | | 4,223 | 100.00% |
| Republican hold | | | |

=== Yavapai-3 ===
General election results
| Party | Candidate | Votes | % |
|---|---|---|---|
| Democratic | Leo Sullivan | 2,366 | 53.90% |
| Republican | Benjamin F. Stephenson | 2,024 | 46.10% |
| Total votes | | 4,390 | 100.00% |
| Democratic gain from Republican | | | |

=== Yuma-1 ===
General election results
| Party | Candidate | Votes | % |
|---|---|---|---|
| Democratic | M. G. (Pop) Miniken (incumbent) | 3,330 | 100.00% |
| Total votes | | 3,330 | 100.00% |
| Democratic hold | | | |

=== Yuma-2 ===
General election results
| Party | Candidate | Votes | % |
|---|---|---|---|
| Democratic | Charles A. Johnson (incumbent) | 3,045 | 66.15% |
| Republican | Robert Ayers | 1,558 | 33.85% |
| Total votes | | 4,603 | 100.00% |
| Democratic hold | | | |

=== Yuma-3 ===
General election results
| Party | Candidate | Votes | % |
|---|---|---|---|
| Democratic | C. L. Slane (incumbent) | 3,175 | 63.18% |
| Republican | King Lees | 1,850 | 36.82% |
| Total votes | | 5,025 | 100.00% |
| Democratic hold | | | |
