= 23rd Arizona State Legislature =

Session of the Arizona Legislature

←	22nd	24th	→
- Arizona State Capitol (2014)

Overview
- Legislative body: Arizona State Legislature
- Jurisdiction: Arizona, United States
- Term: January 1, 1957 – December 31, 1958

Senate
- Members: 28
- Party control: Democratic (26–2)

House of Representatives
- Members: 80
- Party control: Democratic (57–23)

Sessions
- 1st: January 14 – March 15, 1957
- 2nd: January 13 – March 15, 1958

Special sessions
- 1st: January 31 – February 2, 1991

The 23rd Arizona State Legislature, consisting of the Arizona State Senate and the Arizona House of Representatives, was constituted in Phoenix from January 1, 1957, to December 31, 1958, during the second of two terms of Ernest McFarland's time as Governor of Arizona. The number of senators remained constant at two per county, totaling 28, while the number of members of the House of Representatives decreased from 81 to 80. The balance in the upper house continued at a 26–2 margin in favor of the Democrats. In the House, the Republicans picked up three seats, while Democrats lost four seats, however the Democrats still held a 57–23 edge.

== Sessions ==
The Legislature met for two regular sessions at the State Capitol in Phoenix. The first opened on January 14, 1957, and adjourned on March 15, while the second convened on January 13, 1958, and adjourned on March 15. There was a single special session, which convened on March 19, 1958, and adjourned sine die on April 2.

== State Senate ==
=== Members ===
The asterisk (*) denotes members of the previous Legislature who continued in office as members of this Legislature.

County	Senator	Party	Notes
Apache	Lynn Lockhart*	Democrat	
Apache	Melvin C. Greer*	Democrat	
Cochise	Dan S. Kitchel	Democrat	
Cochise	A. R. Spikes*	Democrat	
Coconino	Robert W. Prochnow*	Democrat	
Coconino	Fred F. Udine*	Democrat	
Gila	Clarence L. Carpenter*	Democrat	
Gila	William A. Sullivan*	Democrat	
Graham	W. B. Mattice	Democrat	
Graham	Wilford R. Richardson*	Democrat	
Greenlee	M. L. Sims*	Democrat	
Greenlee	Carl Gale	Democrat	
Maricopa	Joe Haldiman Jr.*	Democrat	
Maricopa	Frank G. Murphy	Democrat	
Mohave	Earl W. Cooke*	Democrat	
Mohave	Robert Morrow*	Democrat	
Navajo	J. Morris Richards	Democrat	
Navajo	William R. Bourdon*	Republican	
Pima	Harry Ackerman	Democrat	
Pima	H. S. Corbett*	Republican	
Pinal	Charles S. Goff*	Democrat	
Pinal	Ben Arnold*	Democrat	
Santa Cruz	Neilson Brown*	Democrat	
Santa Cruz	C. B. Smith*	Democrat	
Yavapai	David H. Palmer	Democrat	
Yavapai	Charles H. Orme Sr.*	Democrat	
Yuma	Harold C. Giss*	Democrat	
Yuma	R. H. Thompson*	Democrat	

== House of Representatives ==
=== Members ===
The asterisk (*) denotes members of the previous Legislature who continued in office as members of this Legislature.

County	Representative	Party	Notes
Apache	James S. Shreeve*	Democrat	
Cochise	Charles O. Bloomquist*	Democrat	
Cochise	W. L. Cook*	Democrat	
Cochise	Clyde M. Dalton*	Democrat	
Cochise	H. J. Lewis	Democrat	
Coconino	Thomas N. Knoles Jr.	Democrat	
Coconino	Harold J. Scudder*	Democrat	
Gila	Nelson D. Breyton*	Democrat	
Gila	Louis B. Ellsworth Jr.*	Democrat	
Gila	Edwynne C. "Polly" Rosenbaum*	Democrat	
Graham	Milton Lines*	Democrat	
Graham	E. L. Tidwell*	Democrat	
Greenlee	Tom W. Berry*	Democrat	
Greenlee	G. O. Biles*	Democrat	
Maricopa	L. S. Adams	Democrat	
Maricopa	Carl C. Andersen*	Republican	
Maricopa	Carl Austin*	Democrat	
Maricopa	W. B. Barkley	Democrat	
Maricopa	Lewis B. Bramkamp	Democrat	
Maricopa	Robert Brewer	Republican	
Maricopa	Isabel Burgess	Republican	
Maricopa	David H. Campbell*	Republican	
Maricopa	Conrad James Carreon*	Democrat	
Maricopa	Sherman R. Dent	Democrat	
Maricopa	Laron Waldo DeWitt	Republican	
Maricopa	Marie S. Earl	Democrat	
Maricopa	Geraldine F. Eliot	Republican	
Maricopa	Ed Ellsworth*	Democrat	
Maricopa	Robert C. Forquer	Republican	
Maricopa	Jack E. Gardner	Democrat	
Maricopa	Arlo O. Gooch	Democrat	
Maricopa	J. O. Grimes*	Democrat	
Maricopa	William J. Harkness*	Democrat	
Maricopa	Vernon Hathcock	Republican	
Maricopa	John C. Hughes	Democrat	
Maricopa	Emogene M. Jennings	Republican	
Maricopa	J. R. Johnson	Democrat	
Maricopa	William Joseph Kamp	Democrat	
Maricopa	Malcom L. Lentz*	Republican	
Maricopa	W. I. (Ike) Lowry*	Republican	
Maricopa	W. W. Mitchell Sr.*	Democrat	
Maricopa	S. Earl Pugh*	Democrat	
Maricopa	Lillian Retzloff*	Democrat	
Maricopa	T. C. Rhodes*	Democrat	
Maricopa	Del Rogers*	Democrat	
Maricopa	Arthur B. Schellenberg*	Republican	
Maricopa	Carl Sims Sr.*	Democrat	
Maricopa	Bill Stephens	Democrat	
Maricopa	R. H. (Bob) Wallace	Republican	
Maricopa	Ruth Adams White*	Republican	
Maricopa	Robert E. Wilson*	Democrat	
Mohave	J. J. Glancy	Democrat	
Navajo	Lee F. Dover*	Democrat	
Navajo	Augusta T. Larson*	Republican	
Pima	W. G. "Bill" Bodell	Republican	
Pima	Keith S. Brown*	Republican	
Pima	Marvin L. Burton	Democrat	
Pima	James W. Carroll*	Democrat	
Pima	William M. Carson	Democrat	
Pima	Harold L. Cook	Democrat	
Pima	James N. Corbett Jr.	Democrat	
Pima	Thomas D. Fridena*	Democrat	
Pima	John H. Haugh*	Republican	
Pima	Douglas S. Holsclaw*	Republican	
Pima	V. S. Hostetter*	Republican	
Pima	Etta Mae Hutcheson*	Democrat	
Pima	Frank G. Robles	Democrat	
Pima	Eaner T. Seaburg	Democrat	
Pima	Alvin Wessler*	Republican	
Pima	Julliette C. Willis*	Republican	
Pinal	Harry Bagnall*	Democrat	
Pinal	Frederick S. Smith*	Democrat	
Pinal	E. Blodwen Thode*	Democrat	
Santa Cruz	Robert R. Hathaway*	Democrat	
Yavapai	Mabel S. Ellis*	Democrat	
Yavapai	Dick W. Martin*	Republican	
Yavapai	M. A. Lindner*	Democrat	
Yuma	Robert L. Klauer*	Democrat	
Yuma	Al Lindsey	Democrat	
Yuma	John C. Smith Jr.	Democrat	
