= Clara Osborne Botzum =

American politician

Arizona House of Representatives
- In office 1942–1948

Arizona House of Representatives
- In office 1958–1962

Personal details
- Born: Clara Osborne; April 11, 1894 Indianapolis
- Died: 1986 (aged 91–92) San Diego
- Party: Democratic Party

Clara Osborne Botzum (April 11, 1894 – 1986) was an Arizona state representative whose work focused on the development of Parker, Arizona, and the Colorado River Valley. She was the first woman to chair the Mines and Mining Committee.

== Biography ==
Osborne was born on April 11, 1894, in Indianapolis. In 1900, the Osborne family moved to Parker, where her father owned a mine. Her family later moved to Pasadena, California, where Osborne attended the Wilson School, Grand School, Girls Collegiate School, and the Theop Institute.

Osborne married Lieutenant Charles O. Botzum, who she divorced after five years. Osborne moved back to Arizona, where she was active in her family's mines. Possibly due to the economic downturn mines faced in the 1920s, Botzum began working as a secretary of the Northern Yuma County Chamber of Commerce by 1930. Botzum was particularly dedicated to the creation of the Parker Bridge, which she advocated for with Isabella Greenway. In September 1937, Botzum cut the ribbon dedicating the bridge.

Botzum also worked as a miner, In 1938, her Lion Hill Mine was "said to have yielded the highest gold content ever found in Arizona."

Botzum ran for state senate in 1934, but was beat by Nellie T. Bush. In 1942, Botzum was elected to the Arizona House of Representatives as the Yuma County representative as a Democrat. She was re-elected for a term from 1958 to 1962, for a total of six terms. She served as vice-chair of the state government committee and chair of the mining committee. She was the first woman to chair the Mines and Mining Committee, earning the title "The Mining Lady."

Botzum continued to work to improve Parker's economy. During World War II, she convinced the federal government to mine war-minerals locally. As Parker had not had a bank in decades, she convinced a banker to open one. She was the honorary chair of the creation of a new county, ultimately leading to the creation of La Paz County, Arizona, with Parker as the county seat.

Botzum died in 1986 on a trip to San Diego.

== Honors and awards ==
- Jan. 4, 1979: Parker Bridge was rededicated in honor of Botzum
- 1983: Spirit of Arizona Award, Arizona Senate
- 1990: Arizona Women's Hall of Fame
