= Douglas S. Holsclaw =

American politician (1898–1995)

Douglas S. Holsclaw (July 31, 1898 – February 9, 1995) was an American politician who served in the Arizona Senate and the Arizona House of Representatives.

Holsclaw was born in Grangeville, Idaho. He joined the military in 1918. Starting in 1921 he attended the University of Arizona, and in 1925 he earned a Bachelor of Science. In 1930 he decided to run as a Republican for a seat in the Arizona Senate, but he was defeated. In 1952 he ran for a seat again and succeeded. He represented Pima County. He proceeded to serve in both houses of the Arizona Legislature for a total of 14 years in the House and 8 years in the Senate. His legislative career came to an end when he lost re-election in 1974.

Holsclaw wrote the official fight song of the University of Arizona, "Fight! Wildcats! Fight!".
