= W. L. Cook =

American politician (1894–1985)

W. L. "Tay" Cook (1894 – March 20, 1985) was an Arizonan politician who served in the Arizona House of Representatives, and was Speaker of that body from 1957 to 1962.

Born in Arizona, Cook was a cattle buyer and rancher. In 1948, he was elected as a Democrat to represent Willcox, Cochise County, in the legislature. He remained in that body until 1962, when he made an unsuccessful bid for a seat in the state senate, thereafter serving several additional terms in the state house beginning in 1964. He was interred at Willcox Cemetery.

Cook died of a heart attack at his home in Willcox at the age of 90, and was interred in that city's Sunset Cemetery.
