= 1966 Arizona House of Representatives election =

1966 Arizona House of Representatives elections
- November 8, 1966

All 60 seats in the Arizona House (Note: Following the landmark Reynolds v. Sims (1964) US Supreme Court decision, every state had to redraw state electoral districts to be approximately equal in population. Before Reynolds, the Arizona House consisted of 80 members each elected from a single district; however, districts could not span more than one county, which resulted in population imbalances between House districts. After the ruling, the Arizona House shifted to multi-member electoral districts that could span multiple counties.) 31 seats needed for a majority
	Majority party	Minority party
Party	Republican	Democratic
Last election	35	45
Seats after	33	27
Seat change	▼2 (Note: The number of House seats decreased from 80 to 60 in this election.)	▼18
Speaker before election
Andrew J. Gilbert
Democrat
Elected Speaker
Stan Turley
Republican

The 1966 Arizona House of Representatives elections were held on November 8, 1966. Voters elected all 60 members of the Arizona House of Representatives in new multi-member districts to serve a two-year term. The elections coincided with the elections for other offices, including Governor, U.S. House, and State Senate.

Following the landmark Reynolds v. Sims (1964) US Supreme Court decision, every state had to redraw state electoral districts to be approximately equal in population. Before Reynolds, the Arizona House consisted of 80 members each elected from single-member districts district; however, districts could not span more than one county, which resulted in population imbalances between House districts. After the ruling, the Arizona House shifted to multi-member electoral districts that could span across counties.

Primary elections were held on September 13, 1966.

Prior to the elections, the Democrats held a majority of 45 seats over the Republicans' 35 seats.

Following the elections, Republicans flipped control of the chamber and took a majority of 33 Republicans to 27 Democrats. Since the total number of House members decreased from 80 to 60, both parties saw decreases in membership; however, the Democrats' decline was much more precipitous: Democrats lost 18 seats while Republicans only decreased by two members. Republicans maintained uninterrupted control of the chamber until the 2026 election.

The newly elected members served in the 28th Arizona State Legislature, during which Republican Stan Turley was chosen as Speaker of the Arizona House. (Note: Turley was elected as Speaker for the 28th legislature, defeating Representative Crosby, who was also nominated for Speaker. The vote tally for Speaker was: Turley-32 votes to Crosby-27 votes. Representative Jay C. Stuckey was absent from the Speaker vote.)

== Summary of Results ==
=== Incumbent Representatives ===
District	Incumbent	Party
Apache-1	Jack A. Brown	Dem
Cochise-1	A. J. (Jack) Gilbert	Dem
Cochise-2	James A. "Jim" Elliott	Dem
Cochise-3	W. L. (Tay) Cook	Dem
Coconino-1	Harold L. Huffer (Note: Democrat Harold L. Huffer was appointed on September 13, 1965 to fill the vacancy created by the death of Democratic Representative Charles W. Sechrist, District 1, Coconino County, Arizona.)	Dem
Coconino-2	Harold J. Scudder	Dem
Gila-1	Charles A. "Bert" Horne	Dem
Gila-2	Polly Rosenbaum	Dem
Graham-1	Gordon L. Hoopes	Dem
Greenlee-1	G. O. (Sonny) Biles	Dem
Maricopa-1	Stan Turley	Rep
Maricopa-2	William S. Porter	Rep
Maricopa-3	D. Delos Ellsworth	Rep
Maricopa-4	James E. Shelley	Rep
Maricopa-5	Jim Holley	Rep
Maricopa-6	David M. Valenzuela	Dem
Maricopa-7	Cloves C. Campbell	Dem
Maricopa-8	Bob Stump	Dem
Maricopa-9	Leon Thompson	Dem
Maricopa-10	Leonard M. Calderon Jr.	Dem
Maricopa-11	LaVerne E. Welker	Dem
Maricopa-12	David B. Kret	Rep
Maricopa-13	Frank J. Kelley	Rep
Maricopa-14	William F. Vipperman	Dem
Maricopa-15	Archie C. Ryan	Dem
Maricopa-16	Elizabeth Adams Rockwell	Rep
Maricopa-17	Robert Hutto	Dem
Maricopa-18	A. E. Kluender	Rep
Maricopa-19	Robert Brewer	Rep
Maricopa-20	Harry Bandouveris	Rep
Maricopa-21	Chet Goldberg Jr.	Rep
Maricopa-22	Walter P. Sherrill	Rep
Maricopa-23	Isabel Burgess	Rep
Maricopa-24	Ruth Adams	Rep
Maricopa-25	John Pritzlaff Jr.	Rep
Maricopa-26	Sam Flake	Rep
Maricopa-27	Burton S. Barr	Rep
Maricopa-28	Ruth Peck	Rep
Maricopa-29	Al Frantz	Dem
Maricopa-30	James Young	Dem
Maricopa-31	Harold W. Smith	Dem
Maricopa-32	M. C. Plummer	Dem
Maricopa-33	Chris T. Johnson	Rep
Maricopa-34	Priscilla Hays	Rep
Maricopa-35	Bob Wilcox	Rep
Maricopa-36	R. Larry Oldham	Rep
Maricopa-37	Davidson Jenks (Note: Republican Albert Faron was appointed on May 31, 1967 to fill the vacancy created by the resignation of Republican Representative Davidson Jenks, District 8-K, Maricopa County, Arizona.)	Rep
Maricopa-38	M. J. (Buck) Brown	Dem
Maricopa-39	Ray A. Goetze	Rep
Maricopa-40	T. C. (Doc) Rhodes	Dem
Mohave-1	Kent Smith	Dem
Navajo-1	Frank L. Crosby	Dem
Navajo-2	Clay B. Simer (Note: Democrat G. O. "Sonny" Biles was appointed on May 31, 1967 to fill the vacancy created by the resignation of Democratic Representative Clay B. Simer, District 3, Apache, Greenlee, and Navajo Counties, Arizona.)	Dem
Pima-1	E. S. (Bud) Walker	Dem
Pima-2	Tony Carrillo	Dem
Pima-3	Etta Mae Hutcheson	Dem
Pima-4	Forrest B. Pearce	Dem
Pima-5	Dr. Thomas D. Fridena	Dem
Pima-6	Douglas S. Holsclaw	Rep
Pima-7	Doris R. Varn	Rep
Pima-8	Thomas G. Beaham	Rep
Pima-9	Neal Justin	Dem
Pima-10	William C. Jacquin	Rep
Pima-11	Ray Martin	Dem
Pima-12	John H. Haugh	Rep
Pima-13	Scott Alexander	Rep
Pima-14	Joe D. Ybarra	Dem
Pima-15	William A. "Tony" Buehl	Rep
Pima-16	Sam Lena (Note: Democrat Sam Lena was sworn-in on January 14, 1965 to fill the vacancy of Democratic Representative Harold L. Cook, District 16, Pima County, Arizona.)	Dem
Pima-17	Sandy Bowling	Dem
Pinal-1	John C. Felix	Dem
Pinal-2	Frederick S. Smith	Dem
Pinal-3	Polly Getzwiller	Dem
Santa Cruz-1	Jesse W. Allen	Rep
Yavapai-1	Gladys Gardner	Rep
Yavapai-2	William D. (Bill) Lyman	Rep
Yavapai-3	Leo Sullivan	Dem
Yuma-1	M. G. (Pop) Miniken	Dem
Yuma-2	Charles A. Johnson	Dem
Yuma-3	C. L. Slane	Dem

=== Elected Representatives ===
District	Elected Representative	Party
1st (Note: Consisted of Mohave & Yavapai)	Gladys Gardner (Note: Redistricted from Yavapai-1 to the 1st district.)	Rep
1st	William D. Lyman (Note: Redistricted from Yavapai-2 to the 1st district.)	Rep
2nd (Note: Consisted of Cochise, Graham, & Santa Cruz)	W. L. "Tay" Cook (Note: Redistricted from Cochise-3 to the 2nd district.)	Dem
2nd	James A. "Jim" Elliott (Note: Redistricted from Cochise-2 to the 2nd district.)	Dem
2nd	A. L. "Fat" Hawes	Dem
2nd	Ed Sawyer	Dem
3rd (Note: Consisted of Apache, Greenlee, & Navajo)	Jack A. Brown (Note: Redistricted from Apache-1 to the 3rd district.)	Dem
3rd	Frank L. Crosby (Note: Redistricted from Navajo-1 to the 3rd district.)	Dem
3rd	Clay B. Simer (Note: Redistricted from Navajo-2 to the 3rd district.)	Dem
3rd	Lloyd L. House	Dem
4th (Note: Consisted of Coconino)	Harold L. Huffer (Note: Redistricted from Coconino-1 to the 4th district.)	Dem
4th	Sam A. McConnell Jr.	Rep
5th (Note: Consisted of Gila & Pinal)	Polly Getzwiller (Note: Redistricted from Pinal-3 to the 5th district.)	Dem
5th	E. C. "Polly" Rosenbaum (Note: Redistricted from Gila-2 to the 5th district.)	Dem
5th	Frederick S. Smith (Note: Redistricted from Pinal-2 to the 5th district.)	Dem
5th	A. V. "Bill" Hardt	Dem
6th (Note: Consisted of Yuma)	Charles A. (Charlie) Johnson (Note: Redistricted from Yuma-2 to the 6th district.)	Dem
6th	M. G. "Pop" Miniken (Note: Redistricted from Yuma-1 to the 6th district.)	Dem
7-A (Note: Consisted of Pima (part))	Tony Carrillo (Note: Redistricted from Pima-2 to the 7-A district.)	Dem
7-A	E. S. (Bud) Walker (Note: Redistricted from Pima-1 to the 7-A district.)	Dem
7-B (Note: Consisted of Pima (part))	Etta Mae Hutcheson (Note: Redistricted from Pima-3 to the 7-B district.)	Dem
7-B	Ethel Maynard	Dem
7-C (Note: Consisted of Pima (part))	Sam Lena (Note: Redistricted from Pima-16 to the 7-C district.)	Dem
7-C	R. P. "Bob" Fricks	Dem
7-D (Note: Consisted of Pima (part))	Richard E. Bailey	Rep
7-D	Thomas N. "Tom" Goodwin	Rep
7-E (Note: Consisted of Pima (part))	Albert C. Williams	Rep
7-E	David B. Stone	Rep
7-F (Note: Consisted of Pima (part))	Scott Alexander (Note: Redistricted from Pima-13 to the 7-F district.)	Rep
7-F	W. A. "Tony" Buehl (Note: Redistricted from Pima-15 to the 7-F district.)	Rep
8-A (Note: Consisted of Maricopa (part))	Walter E. Bloom	Rep
8-A	James F. Holley (Note: Redistricted from Maricopa-5 to the 8-A district.)	Rep
8-B (Note: Consisted of Maricopa (part))	D. Delos Ellsworth (Note: Redistricted from Maricopa-3 to the 8-B district.)	Rep
8-B	Stan Turley (Note: Redistricted from Maricopa-1 to the 8-B district.)	Rep
8-C (Note: Consisted of Maricopa (part))	Sam Flake (Note: Redistricted from Maricopa-26 to the 8-C district.)	Rep
8-C	John C. Pritzlaff Jr. (Note: Redistricted from Maricopa-25 to the 8-C district.)	Rep
8-D (Note: Consisted of Maricopa (part))	Frank Kelley (Note: Redistricted from Maricopa-13 to the 8-D district.)	Rep
8-D	James Shelley (Note: Redistricted from Maricopa-4 to the 8-D district.)	Rep
8-E (Note: Consisted of Maricopa (part))	Ruth Adams (Note: Redistricted from Maricopa-24 to the 8-E district.)	Rep
8-E	John D. Roeder	Rep
8-F (Note: Consisted of Maricopa (part))	D. Lee Jones	Rep
8-F	W. F. "Pat" Vipperman (Note: Redistricted from Maricopa-14 to the 8-F district.)	Dem
8-G (Note: Consisted of Maricopa (part))	Leon Thompson (Note: Redistricted from Maricopa-9 to the 8-G district.)	Dem
8-G	Tony Abril	Dem
8-H (Note: Consisted of Maricopa (part))	Jay Stuckey	Rep
8-H	Elizabeth Adams Rockwell (Note: Redistricted from Maricopa-16 to the 8-H district.)	Rep
8-I (Note: Consisted of Maricopa (part))	Burton S. Barr (Note: Redistricted from Maricopa-27 to the 8-I district.)	Rep
8-I	Ruth Peck (Note: Redistricted from Maricopa-28 to the 8-I district.)	Rep
8-J (Note: Consisted of Maricopa (part))	Stan Akers	Rep
8-J	Timothy A. Barrow	Rep
8-K (Note: Consisted of Maricopa (part))	Davidson Jenks (Note: Redistricted from Maricopa-37 to the 8-K district.)	Rep
8-K	George J. Pale	Rep
8-L (Note: Consisted of Maricopa (part))	Rex J. Farley	Rep
8-L	Joseph Shaughnessy Jr.	Rep
8-M (Note: Consisted of Maricopa (part))	Bess B. Stinson	Rep
8-M	J. R. "Bob" Rickard	Dem
8-N (Note: Consisted of Maricopa (part))	Art Coppinger	Dem
8-N	Manuel "Lito" Peña Jr.	Dem
8-O (Note: Consisted of Maricopa (part))	Al Kluender	Rep
8-O	Fred Koory Jr.	Rep

== Detailed Results ==
=== District 1 ===
Primary Election Results
Party	Candidate	Votes	%
Democratic Party Primary Results
Democratic	Leo Sullivan (incumbent) (Note: Redistricted from Yavapai-3 to the 1st district.)	4,410	54.34%
Democratic	Mabel S. Ellis	3,706	45.66%
Total votes		8,116	100.00%
Republican Party Primary Results
Republican	W.D. (Bill) Lyman (incumbent)	3,170	53.92%
Republican	Gladys Gardner (incumbent)	2,709	46.08%
Total votes		5,879	100.00%

General Election Results
Party	Candidate	Votes	%
Republican	W. D. (Bill) Lyman (incumbent)	7,849	28.65%
Republican	Gladys Gardner (incumbent)	7,410	27.05%
Democratic	Leo Sullivan (incumbent)	6,312	23.04%
Democratic	Mabel S. Ellis	5,826	21.27%
Total votes		27,397	100.00%

=== District 2 ===
Primary Election Results
Party	Candidate	Votes	%
Democratic Party Primary Results
Democratic	James A. "Jim" Elliott (incumbent)	8,006	25.84%
Democratic	W. L. "Tay" Cook (incumbent)	7,837	25.29%
Democratic	Ed Sawyer	7,758	25.04%
Democratic	A. L. "Fat" Hawes	7,382	23.83%
Total votes		30,983	100.00%

General Election Results
Party	Candidate	Votes	%
Democratic	W. L. "Tay" Cook (incumbent)	12,802	25.37%
Democratic	James A. "Jim" Elliott (incumbent)	12,796	25.36%
Democratic	Ed Sawyer	12,592	24.95%
Democratic	A. L. "Fat" Hawes	12,269	24.31%
Total votes		50,459	100.00%

=== District 3 ===
Primary Election Results
Party	Candidate	Votes	%
Democratic Party Primary Results
Democratic	Jack A. Brown (incumbent)	5,586	21.83%
Democratic	Frank L. Crosby (incumbent)	5,425	21.20%
Democratic	Lloyd L. House	4,939	19.30%
Democratic	Clay B. Simer (incumbent)	4,823	18.85%
Democratic	G. O. (Sonny) Biles (incumbent) (Note: Redistricted from Greenlee-1 to the 3rd district.)	4,814	18.81%
Total votes		25,587	100.00%
Republican Party Primary Results
Republican	Drew Shumway	1,436	100.00%
Total votes		1,436	100.00%

General Election Results
Party	Candidate	Votes	%
Democratic	Frank L. Crosby (incumbent)	9,237	22.07%
Democratic	Jack A. Brown (incumbent)	9,136	21.82%
Democratic	Clay B. Simer (incumbent)	8,438	20.16%
Democratic	Lloyd L. House	8,324	19.88%
Republican	Drew Shumway	6,727	16.07%
Total votes		41,862	100.00%

=== District 4 ===
Primary Election Results
Party	Candidate	Votes	%
Democratic Party Primary Results
Democratic	Harold L. Huffer (incumbent)	2,164	100.00%
Total votes		2,164	100.00%
Republican Party Primary Results
Republican	Sam A. McConnell Jr.	1,087	100.00%
Total votes		1,087	100.00%

General Election Results
Party	Candidate	Votes	%
Democratic	Harold L. Huffer (incumbent)	3,967	50.14%
Republican	Sam A. McConnell Jr.	3,945	49.86%
Total votes		7,912	100.00%

=== District 5 ===
Primary Election Results
Party	Candidate	Votes	%
Democratic Party Primary Results
Democratic	A. V. "Bill" Hardt	8,800	18.84%
Democratic	E. C. "Polly" Rosenbaum (incumbent)	8,742	18.71%
Democratic	Polly Getzwiller (incumbent)	8,266	17.69%
Democratic	Frederick S. Smith (incumbent)	7,412	15.87%
Democratic	D. H. (Don) Haines	6,795	14.55%
Democratic	John C. Felix (incumbent) (Note: Redistricted from Pinal-1 to the 5th district.)	6,702	14.35%
Total votes		46,717	100.00%
Republican Party Primary Results
Republican	Kenneth Rogers	1,878	100.00%
Total votes		1,878	100.00%

General Election Results
Party	Candidate	Votes	%
Democratic	Polly Getzwiller (incumbent)	15,263	22.96%
Democratic	A. V. "Bill" Hardt	15,075	22.67%
Democratic	E. C. "Polly" Rosenbaum (incumbent)	14,764	22.21%
Democratic	Frederick S. Smith (incumbent)	13,702	20.61%
Republican	Kenneth Rogers	7,680	11.55%
Total votes		66,484	100.00%

=== District 6 ===
Primary Election Results
Party	Candidate	Votes	%
Democratic Party Primary Results
Democratic	Charles A. (Charlie) Johnson (incumbent)	3,598	40.07%
Democratic	M. G. "Pop" Miniken (incumbent)	3,540	39.42%
Democratic	W. J. "Bill" Kamp	1,842	20.51%
Total votes		8,980	100.00%

General Election Results
Party	Candidate	Votes	%
Democratic	Charles A. (Charlie) Johnson (incumbent)	7,191	50.69%
Democratic	M. G. "Pop" Miniken (incumbent)	6,995	49.31%
Total votes		14,186	100.00%

=== District 7-A ===
Primary Election Results
Party	Candidate	Votes	%
Democratic Party Primary Results
Democratic	Tony Carrillo (incumbent)	3,156	31.20%
Democratic	E. S. (Bud) Walker (incumbent)	2,356	23.29%
Democratic	James A. McGhee	1,349	13.34%
Democratic	Bernardo M. "Nayo" Cajero	1,287	12.72%
Democratic	A. C. "Adolph" Loustaunau	1,190	11.76%
Democratic	"Harry" H. M. Solorio	778	7.69%
Total votes		10,116	100.00%
Republican Party Primary Results
Republican	James R. Grainger	927	100.00%
Total votes		927	100.00%

General Election Results
Party	Candidate	Votes	%
Democratic	E. S. (Bud) Walker (incumbent)	7,833	40.53%
Democratic	Tony Carrillo (incumbent)	7,663	39.65%
Republican	James R. Grainger	3,830	19.82%
Total votes		19,326	100.00%

=== District 7-B ===
Primary Election Results
Party	Candidate	Votes	%
Democratic Party Primary Results
Democratic	Etta Mae Hutcheson (incumbent)	2,646	47.34%
Democratic	Ethel Maynard	1,494	26.73%
Democratic	Adelaide Fridena	1,449	25.93%
Total votes		5,589	100.00%
Republican Party Primary Results
Republican	Morgan Maxwell Jr.	1,034	100.00%
Total votes		1,034	100.00%

General Election Results
Party	Candidate	Votes	%
Democratic	Etta Mae Hutcheson (incumbent)	6,116	39.25%
Democratic	Ethel Maynard	5,013	32.17%
Republican	Morgan Maxwell Jr.	4,452	28.57%
Total votes		15,581	100.00%

=== District 7-C ===
Primary Election Results
Party	Candidate	Votes	%
Democratic Party Primary Results
Democratic	Sam Lena (incumbent)	2,297	32.10%
Democratic	R. P. "Bob" Fricks	1,531	21.40%
Democratic	J. H. "Jim" Dewberry	1,460	20.41%
Democratic	James (Jim) C. Thomas	1,033	14.44%
Democratic	Kenneth Massie	834	11.66%
Total votes		7,155	100.00%
Republican Party Primary Results
Republican	Walter Frank Dellow	1,468	100.00%
Total votes		1,468	100.00%

General Election Results
Party	Candidate	Votes	%
Democratic	Sam Lena (incumbent)	6,781	36.59%
Democratic	R. P. "Bob" Fricks	6,505	35.10%
Republican	Walter Frank Dellow	5,245	28.30%
Total votes		18,531	100.00%

=== District 7-D ===
Primary Election Results
Party	Candidate	Votes	%
Democratic Party Primary Results
Democratic	David Wine	2,639	100.00%
Total votes		2,639	100.00%
Republican Party Primary Results
Republican	Richard E. Bailey	1,691	28.73%
Republican	Thomas N. "Tom" Goodwin	1,573	26.72%
Republican	Julliette C. Willis	1,563	26.55%
Republican	Doris Varn (incumbent) (Note: Redistricted from Pima-7 to the 7-D district.)	1,059	17.99%
Total votes		5,886	100.00%

General Election Results
Party	Candidate	Votes	%
Republican	Richard E. Bailey	7,414	35.84%
Republican	Thomas N. "Tom" Goodwin	7,351	35.54%
Democratic	David Wine	5,920	28.62%
Total votes		20,685	100.00%

=== District 7-E ===
Primary Election Results
Party	Candidate	Votes	%
Democratic Party Primary Results
Democratic	Ray Martin (incumbent) (Note: Redistricted from Pima-11 to the 7-E district.)	2,645	100.00%
Total votes		2,645	100.00%
Republican Party Primary Results
Republican	Albert C. Williams	2,297	51.89%
Republican	David B. Stone	2,130	48.11%
Total votes		4,427	100.00%

General Election Results
Party	Candidate	Votes	%
Republican	Albert C. Williams	7,085	35.80%
Republican	David B. Stone	6,893	34.83%
Democratic	Ray Martin (incumbent)	5,812	29.37%
Total votes		19,790	100.00%

=== District 7-F ===
Primary Election Results
Party	Candidate	Votes	%
Democratic Party Primary Results
Democratic	Joseph "Joe" Minarik	2,600	54.11%
Democratic	George B. Marvel	2,205	45.89%
Total votes		4,805	100.00%
Republican Party Primary Results
Republican	Scott Alexander (incumbent)	3,327	55.11%
Republican	W. A. "Tony" Buehl (incumbent)	2,710	44.89%
Total votes		6,037	100.00%

General Election Results
Party	Candidate	Votes	%
Republican	Scott Alexander (incumbent)	8,947	33.48%
Republican	W. A. "Tony" Buehl (incumbent)	8,174	30.59%
Democratic	Joseph "Joe" Minarik	5,163	19.32%
Democratic	George B. Marvel	4,437	16.60%
Total votes		26,721	100.00%

=== District 8-A ===
Primary Election Results
Party	Candidate	Votes	%
Democratic Party Primary Results
Democratic	Dr. John Carney	2,780	35.11%
Democratic	William "Bill" Petersen	1,954	24.68%
Democratic	Efren Valenzuela	1,242	15.69%
Democratic	Carl J. Blanton	708	8.94%
Democratic	Huey Johnson	655	8.27%
Democratic	Al Monday	579	7.31%
Total votes		7,918	100.00%
Republican Party Primary Results
Republican	James F. Holley (incumbent)	1,913	35.90%
Republican	Walter E. Bloom	1,677	31.48%
Republican	Carl B. Kinsley	1,040	19.52%
Republican	Frank Armenta	698	13.10%
Total votes		5,328	100.00%

General Election Results
Party	Candidate	Votes	%
Republican	Walter E. Bloom	7,338	27.07%
Republican	James F. Holley (incumbent)	7,260	26.78%
Democratic	Dr. John Carney	6,700	24.71%
Democratic	William Petersen	5,814	21.44%
Total votes		27,112	100.00%

=== District 8-B ===
Primary Election Results
Party	Candidate	Votes	%
Democratic Party Primary Results
Democratic	Duke Morris	2,134	57.32%
Democratic	Donald Bogle	1,589	42.68%
Total votes		3,723	100.00%
Republican Party Primary Results
Republican	Stan Turley (incumbent)	3,088	50.41%
Republican	D. Delos Ellsworth (incumbent)	3,038	49.59%
Total votes		6,126	100.00%

General Election Results
Party	Candidate	Votes	%
Republican	D. Delos Ellsworth (incumbent)	9,908	35.11%
Republican	Stan Turley (incumbent)	9,764	34.60%
Democratic	Duke Morris	4,707	16.68%
Democratic	Donald Bogle	3,841	13.61%
Total votes		28,220	100.00%

=== District 8-C ===
Primary Election Results
Party	Candidate	Votes	%
Democratic Party Primary Results
Democratic	Vernon Smith	1,547	57.17%
Democratic	N. James Gremanis	1,159	42.83%
Total votes		2,706	100.00%
Republican Party Primary Results
Republican	John C. Pritzlaff (incumbent)	4,121	42.48%
Republican	Sam Flake (incumbent)	2,109	21.74%
Republican	Joseph C. Meier	2,034	20.96%
Republican	Allen Wood	1,438	14.82%
Total votes		9,702	100.00%

General Election Results
Party	Candidate	Votes	%
Republican	John C. Pritzlaff (incumbent)	11,395	39.26%
Republican	Sam Flake (incumbent)	10,177	35.06%
Democratic	Vernon Smith	3,982	13.72%
Democratic	N. James Gremanis	3,474	11.97%
Total votes		29,028	100.00%

=== District 8-D ===
Primary Election Results
Party	Candidate	Votes	%
Democratic Party Primary Results
Democratic	Robert L. Reding	1,920	57.57%
Democratic	Dorothy Boone Survaunt	1,415	42.43%
Total votes		3,335	100.00%
Republican Party Primary Results
Republican	James "Jim" Shelley (incumbent)	2,388	51.18%
Republican	Frank Kelley (incumbent)	2,278	48.82%
Total votes		4,666	100.00%

General Election Results
Party	Candidate	Votes	%
Republican	James Shelley (incumbent)	8,717	33.47%
Republican	Frank Kelley (incumbent)	8,451	32.44%
Democratic	Robert L. Reding	4,798	18.42%
Democratic	Dorothy Boone Survaunt	4,082	15.67%
Total votes		26,048	100.00%

=== District 8-E ===
Primary Election Results
Party	Candidate	Votes	%
Democratic Party Primary Results
Democratic	Frank Kadish	1,966	52.08%
Democratic	Eleanor P. Breen	1,809	47.92%
Total votes		3,775	100.00%
Republican Party Primary Results
Republican	Ruth Adams (incumbent)	2,104	23.23%
Republican	John D. Roeder	2,052	22.65%
Republican	Cecelia Kline	1,923	21.23%
Republican	Dr. W. P. Sherrill (incumbent) (Note: Redistricted from Maricopa-22 to the 8-E district.)	1,787	19.73%
Republican	Arthur L. Musil	1,192	13.16%
Total votes		9,058	100.00%

General Election Results
Party	Candidate	Votes	%
Republican	Ruth Adams (incumbent)	9,615	34.62%
Republican	John D. Roeder	9,591	34.53%
Democratic	Frank Kadish	4,374	15.75%
Democratic	Eleanor P. Breen	4,193	15.10%
Total votes		27,773	100.00%

=== District 8-F ===
Primary Election Results
Party	Candidate	Votes	%
Democratic Party Primary Results
Democratic	W. F. (Pat) Vipperman (incumbent)	2,615	38.59%
Democratic	LaVerne E. Welker (incumbent) (Note: Redistricted from Maricopa-11 to the 8-F district.)	1,610	23.76%
Democratic	Rev. Eugene Martell	1,342	19.81%
Democratic	Laura "Dixie" McCauley	1,209	17.84%
Total votes		6,776	100.00%
Republican Party Primary Results
Republican	D. Lee Jones	1,969	100.00%
Total votes		1,969	100.00%

General Election Results
Party	Candidate	Votes	%
Republican	D. Lee Jones	6,549	33.98%
Democratic	W. F. "Pat" Vipperman (incumbent)	6,395	33.18%
Democratic	LaVerne E. Welker (incumbent)	6,329	32.84%
Total votes		19,273	100.00%

=== District 8-G ===
Primary Election Results
Party	Candidate	Votes	%
Democratic Party Primary Results
Democratic	Leon Thompson (incumbent)	1,303	16.40%
Democratic	Tony Abril	896	11.27%
Democratic	Lonnie Q. Gray	763	9.60%
Democratic	Tony Huguez	746	9.39%
Democratic	N. J. (Chuy) Alvidrez Jr.	703	8.85%
Democratic	Lester (LBJ) Jackson	701	8.82%
Democratic	Conrado S. Chavez	659	8.29%
Democratic	Robert B. Dawson Jr.	646	8.13%
Democratic	R. C. (Bob) Starr	552	6.95%
Democratic	Horace E. Owens	538	6.77%
Democratic	Harold W. "Hal" Price	440	5.54%
Total votes		7,947	100.00%
Republican Party Primary Results
Republican	Ford Smith	474	100.00%
Total votes		474	100.00%

General Election Results
Party	Candidate	Votes	%
Democratic	Leon Thompson (incumbent)	7,547	44.02%
Democratic	Tony Abril	7,138	41.63%
Republican	Ford Smith	2,460	14.35%
Total votes		17,145	100.00%

=== District 8-H ===
Primary Election Results
Party	Candidate	Votes	%
Democratic Party Primary Results
Democratic	Sybil Udall	2,345	41.47%
Democratic	N. Pike Johnson Jr.	2,070	36.60%
Democratic	Art Haritos	1,240	21.93%
Total votes		5,655	100.00%
Republican Party Primary Results
Republican	Elizabeth Adams Rockwell (incumbent)	2,454	50.04%
Republican	Jay Stuckey	2,450	49.96%
Total votes		4,904	100.00%

General Election Results
Party	Candidate	Votes	%
Republican	Jay Stuckey	7,826	30.32%
Republican	Elizabeth Adams Rockwell (incumbent)	7,717	29.90%
Democratic	Sybil Udall	5,474	21.21%
Democratic	N. Pike Johnson Jr.	4,795	18.58%
Total votes		25,812	100.00%

=== District 8-I ===
Primary Election Results
Party	Candidate	Votes	%
Democratic Party Primary Results
Democratic	Herbert F. Knauss Jr.	2,015	39.76%
Democratic	Michael Mignella	1,786	35.24%
Democratic	Toni Marie Westervelt	1,267	25.00%
Total votes		5,068	100.00%
Republican Party Primary Results
Republican	Burton S. Barr (incumbent)	3,113	41.76%
Republican	Ruth Peck (incumbent)	3,037	40.74%
Republican	Albert (Al) Kane	1,304	17.49%
Total votes		7,454	100.00%

General Election Results
Party	Candidate	Votes	%
Republican	Burton S. Barr (incumbent)	9,158	32.05%
Republican	Ruth Peck (incumbent)	8,855	30.99%
Democratic	Michael Mignella	5,569	19.49%
Democratic	Herbert F. Knauss	4,989	17.46%
Total votes		28,571	100.00%

=== District 8-J ===
Primary Election Results
Party	Candidate	Votes	%
Democratic Party Primary Results
Democratic	Joseph E. (Joe) Lawrence	1,900	41.91%
Democratic	Robert B. Selman	1,389	30.64%
Democratic	Les Arie	1,245	27.46%
Total votes		4,534	100.00%
Republican Party Primary Results
Republican	Timothy A. Barrow	3,571	51.66%
Republican	Stan Akers	3,341	48.34%
Total votes		6,912	100.00%

General Election Results
Party	Candidate	Votes	%
Republican	Timothy A. Barrow	10,095	34.98%
Republican	Stan Akers	9,243	32.03%
Democratic	Joseph E. Lawrence	5,126	17.76%
Democratic	Robert B. Selman	4,396	15.23%
Total votes		28,860	100.00%

=== District 8-K ===
Primary Election Results
Party	Candidate	Votes	%
Democratic Party Primary Results
Democratic	Bill Brown	1,798	100.00%
Total votes		1,798	100.00%
Republican Party Primary Results
Republican	Davidson (Dave) Jenks (incumbent)	2,366	29.72%
Republican	George J. Pale	2,281	28.65%
Republican	Keith Jensen	2,215	27.82%
Republican	Richard F. (Dick) Hensley	1,099	13.80%
Total votes		7,961	100.00%

General Election Results
Party	Candidate	Votes	%
Republican	Davidson Jenks (incumbent)	9,555	39.88%
Republican	George J. Pale	9,451	39.45%
Democratic	Bill Brown	4,953	20.67%
Total votes		23,959	100.00%

=== District 8-L ===
Primary Election Results
Party	Candidate	Votes	%
Democratic Party Primary Results
Democratic	Harry E. Craig	2,446	38.10%
Democratic	M. C. "Mack" Plummer (incumbent) (Note: Redistricted from Maricopa-32 to the 8-L district.)	1,920	29.91%
Democratic	William A. (Bill) Naff	1,272	19.81%
Democratic	Bob Colfer	782	12.18%
Total votes		6,420	100.00%
Republican Party Primary Results
Republican	Joseph Shaughnessy Jr.	1,948	36.50%
Republican	Rex J. Farley	1,255	23.52%
Republican	R. D. "Bob" Terry	1,113	20.85%
Republican	Cal Vander Molen	1,021	19.13%
Total votes		5,337	100.00%

General Election Results
Party	Candidate	Votes	%
Republican	Joseph Shaughnessy Jr.	7,983	28.12%
Republican	Rex J. Farley	7,586	26.72%
Democratic	Harry E. Craig	6,669	23.49%
Democratic	M. C. Plummer (incumbent)	6,156	21.68%
Total votes		28,394	100.00%

=== District 8-M ===
Primary Election Results
Party	Candidate	Votes	%
Democratic Party Primary Results
Democratic	J. R. (Bob) Rickard	1,919	25.90%
Democratic	Al Frantz (incumbent) (Note: Redistricted from Maricopa-29 to the 8-M district.)	1,573	21.23%
Democratic	James Godbehere	1,234	16.66%
Democratic	Jack J. Halperin	984	13.28%
Democratic	E. Coleman Gorman	701	9.46%
Democratic	Lorraine Williams	643	8.68%
Democratic	Charles P. Rizer	354	4.78%
Total votes		7,408	100.00%
Republican Party Primary Results
Republican	Bess B. Stinson	1,739	52.07%
Republican	J. H. "Jerry" Evenson	1,601	47.93%
Total votes		3,340	100.00%

General Election Results
Party	Candidate	Votes	%
Republican	Bess B. Stinson	6,701	26.94%
Democratic	J. R. (Bob) Rickard	6,279	25.24%
Democratic	Al Frantz (incumbent)	6,055	24.34%
Republican	J. H. Evenson	5,842	23.48%
Total votes		24,877	100.00%

=== District 8-N ===
Primary Election Results
Party	Candidate	Votes	%
Democratic Party Primary Results
Democratic	Art Coppinger	1,918	21.06%
Democratic	Manuel "Lito" Peña Jr.	1,689	18.55%
Democratic	Frank Delise	1,659	18.22%
Democratic	Truman Cook	1,434	15.75%
Democratic	Dick C. Cox	969	10.64%
Democratic	Norman "Shorty" Lee	812	8.92%
Democratic	James Gore	625	6.86%
Total votes		9,106	100.00%
Republican Party Primary Results
Republican	William A. Herron	1,165	100.00%
Total votes		1,165	100.00%

General Election Results
Party	Candidate	Votes	%
Democratic	Art Coppinger	7,157	39.43%
Democratic	Manuel "Lito" Peña Jr.	6,720	37.02%
Republican	William A. Herron	4,275	23.55%
Total votes		18,152	100.00%

=== District 8-O ===
Primary Election Results
Party	Candidate	Votes	%
Democratic Party Primary Results
Democratic	Harold W. Smith (incumbent) (Note: Redistricted from Maricopa-31 to the 8-O district.)	2,490	34.95%
Democratic	J. Lee Henry	1,533	21.52%
Democratic	W. E. "Duke" Knox	1,211	17.00%
Democratic	Raymond (Ray) Plante	991	13.91%
Democratic	Frank H. Chew	899	12.62%
Total votes		7,124	100.00%
Republican Party Primary Results
Republican	Al Kluender	2,172	53.51%
Republican	Fred Koory Jr.	1,887	46.49%
Total votes		4,059	100.00%

General Election Results
Party	Candidate	Votes	%
Republican	Al Kluender	7,239	29.70%
Republican	Fred Koory Jr.	6,596	27.06%
Democratic	Harold W. Smith (incumbent)	5,901	24.21%
Democratic	J. Lee Henry	4,640	19.04%
Total votes		24,376	100.00%
