= 1968 Arizona House of Representatives election =

1968 Arizona House of Representatives elections
- November 5, 1968

All 60 seats in the Arizona House 31 seats needed for a majority
	Majority party	Minority party
Party	Republican	Democratic
Last election	33	27
Seats after	34	26
Seat change	▲1	▼1
Speaker before election
Stan Turley
Republican
Elected Speaker
John H. Haugh
Republican

The 1968 Arizona House of Representatives elections were held on November 5, 1968. Voters elected all 60 members of the Arizona House of Representatives in multi-member districts to serve a two-year term. The elections coincided with the elections for other offices, including Governor, U.S. Senate, U.S. House, and State Senate.

Primary elections were held on September 10, 1968.

Prior to the elections, the Republicans held a majority of 33 seats over the Democrats' 27 seats.

Following the elections, Republicans maintained control of the chamber and expanded their majority to 34 Republicans to 26 Democrats, a net gain of one seat for Republicans.

The newly elected members served in the 29th Arizona State Legislature, during which Republican John H. Haugh was chosen as Speaker of the Arizona House. (Note: Haugh was elected as Speaker for the 29th legislature, defeating Representative Brown, who was also nominated for Speaker. The vote tally for Speaker was: Haugh-33 votes to Brown-26 votes. Representative John C. Pritzlaff Jr. was absent from the Speaker vote.)

== Summary of Results by Arizona State Legislative District ==
District	Incumbent	Party	Elected Representative	Outcome
1st (Note: Consisted of Mohave & Yavapai)	Gladys Gardner	Rep	Gladys Gardner	Rep Hold
1st	William D. Lyman	Rep	Ray Everett	Rep Hold
2nd (Note: Consisted of Cochise, Graham, & Santa Cruz)	W. L. "Tay" Cook	Dem	W. L. "Tay" Cook	Dem Hold
2nd	Ed Sawyer	Dem	Ed Sawyer	Dem Hold
2nd	James A. "Jim" Elliott	Dem	H.F. (Hank) Fenn	Dem Hold
2nd	A. L. "Fat" Hawes	Dem	Richard "Dick" Pacheco	Dem Hold
3rd (Note: Consisted of Apache, Greenlee, & Navajo)	Jack A. Brown	Dem	Jack A. Brown	Dem Hold
3rd	G. O. "Sonny" Biles (Note: Democrat G. O. "Sonny" Biles was appointed on May 31, 1967 to fill the vacancy created by the resignation of Democratic Representative Clay B. Simer, District 3, Apache, Greenlee, and Navajo Counties, Arizona.)	Dem	G. O. "Sonny" Biles	Dem Hold
3rd	Frank L. Crosby	Dem	Boyd A. Shumway	Dem Hold
3rd	Lloyd L. House	Dem	Lynn Tanner	Dem Hold
4th (Note: Consisted of Coconino)	Harold L. Huffer	Dem	Harold L. Huffer	Dem Hold
4th	Sam A. McConnell Jr.	Rep	Sam A. McConnell Jr.	Rep Hold
5th (Note: Consisted of Gila & Pinal)	Polly Getzwiller	Dem	Polly Getzwiller	Dem Hold
5th	E. C. (Polly) Rosenbaum	Dem	E. C. (Polly) Rosenbaum	Dem Hold
5th	Fred S. Smith	Dem	Fred S. Smith	Dem Hold
5th	A. V. "Bill" Hardt	Dem	Craig E. Davids	Dem Hold
6th (Note: Consisted of Yuma)	Charles A. (Charlie) Johnson	Dem	Charles A. (Charlie) Johnson	Dem Hold
6th	M. G. "Pop" Miniken	Dem	M. G. "Pop" Miniken	Dem Hold
7-A (Note: Consisted of Pima (part))	E. S. "Bud" Walker	Dem	E. S. "Bud" Walker	Dem Hold
7-A	Tony Carrillo	Dem	Bernardo M. "Nayo" Cajero	Dem Hold
7-B (Note: Consisted of Pima (part))	Etta Mae Hutcheson	Dem	Etta Mae Hutcheson	Dem Hold
7-B	Ethel Maynard	Dem	Ethel Maynard	Dem Hold
7-C (Note: Consisted of Pima (part))	R. P. "Bob" Fricks	Dem	R. P. "Bob" Fricks	Dem Hold
7-C	Sam Lena	Dem	J. H. "Jim" Dewberry Jr.	Dem Hold
7-D (Note: Consisted of Pima (part))	Thomas N. (Tom) Goodwin	Rep	Thomas N. (Tom) Goodwin	Rep Hold
7-D	Richard E. Bailey	Rep	John H. Haugh	Rep Hold
7-E (Note: Consisted of Pima (part))	David B. Stone	Rep	David B. Stone	Rep Hold
7-E	Albert C. Williams	Rep	Albert C. Williams	Rep Hold
7-F (Note: Consisted of Pima (part))	Scott Alexander	Rep	Scott Alexander	Rep Hold
7-F	W. A. "Tony" Buehl	Rep	W. A. "Tony" Buehl	Rep Hold
8-A (Note: Consisted of Maricopa (part))	Walter E. Bloom	Rep	Walter E. Bloom	Rep Hold
8-A	James F. Holley	Rep	James J. Sossaman	Rep Hold
8-B (Note: Consisted of Maricopa (part))	Stan Turley	Rep	Stan Turley	Rep Hold
8-B	D. Delos Ellsworth	Rep	Jim L. Cooper	Rep Hold
8-C (Note: Consisted of Maricopa (part))	Sam Flake	Rep	Sam Flake	Rep Hold
8-C	John C. Pritzlaff Jr.	Rep	John C. Pritzlaff Jr. (Note: Republican Peter Kay was appointed on January 5, 1970 to fill the vacancy created by the resignation of Republican Representative John C. Pritzlaff Jr., District 8-C, Maricopa County, Arizona.)	Rep Hold
8-D (Note: Consisted of Maricopa (part))	Frank Kelley	Rep	Frank Kelley	Rep Hold
8-D	James "Jim" Shelley	Rep	James "Jim" Shelley	Rep Hold
8-E (Note: Consisted of Maricopa (part))	Ruth Adams	Rep	Ruth Adams	Rep Hold
8-E	John D. Roeder	Rep	John D. Roeder	Rep Hold
8-F (Note: Consisted of Maricopa (part))	D. Lee Jones	Rep	D. Lee Jones	Rep Hold
8-F	W. F. "Pat" Vipperman	Dem	Renz D. Jennings	Dem Hold
8-G (Note: Consisted of Maricopa (part))	Leon Thompson	Dem	Leon Thompson	Dem Hold
8-G	Tony Abril	Dem	Tony Abril	Dem Hold
8-H (Note: Consisted of Maricopa (part))	Elizabeth Adams Rockwell	Rep	Elizabeth Adams Rockwell	Rep Hold
8-H	Jay C. Stuckey	Rep	Jay C. Stuckey	Rep Hold
8-I (Note: Consisted of Maricopa (part))	Burton Barr	Rep	Burton Barr	Rep Hold
8-I	Ruth Peck	Rep	Ruth Peck	Rep Hold
8-J (Note: Consisted of Maricopa (part))	Stan Akers	Rep	Stan Akers	Rep Hold
8-J	Timothy A. Barrow	Rep	Timothy A. Barrow	Rep Hold
8-K (Note: Consisted of Maricopa (part))	George J. Palé (Note: His name is written as "Pale", "Pale'", and "Palé" on various documents. Nonetheless, it seems the correct spelling of his name is George J. Palé, according to the Arizona State Library.)	Rep	George J. Palé	Rep Hold
8-K	Albert Faron (Note: Republican Albert Faron was appointed on May 31, 1967 to fill the vacancy created by the resignation of Republican Representative Davidson Jenks, District 8-K, Maricopa County, Arizona.)	Rep	Stuart Schoenburg	Rep Hold
8-L (Note: Consisted of Maricopa (part))	Joseph (Joe) Shaughnessy Jr.	Rep	Joseph (Joe) Shaughnessy Jr.	Rep Hold
8-L	Rex J. Farley	Rep	Don Stewart	Rep Hold
8-M (Note: Consisted of Maricopa (part))	Bess B. Stinson	Rep	Bess B. Stinson	Rep Hold
8-M	J. R. "Bob" Rickard	Dem	Edward C. "Ed" Andrews	Rep Gain
8-N (Note: Consisted of Maricopa (part))	Art Coppinger	Dem	Art Coppinger	Dem Hold
8-N	Manuel "Lito" Peña Jr.	Dem	Manuel "Lito" Peña Jr.	Dem Hold
8-O (Note: Consisted of Maricopa (part))	Fred Koory Jr.	Rep	Fred Koory Jr.	Rep Hold
8-O	Al Kluender	Rep	C. W. "Bill" Lewis	Rep Hold

== Detailed Results ==
=== District 1 ===
Primary Election Results
Party	Candidate	Votes	%
Democratic Party Primary Results
Democratic	Merle L. Farmer	4,473	51.82%
Democratic	Joseph W. "Joe" Kinateder	4,159	48.18%
Total votes		8,632	100.00%
Republican Party Primary Results
Republican	Ray Everett	3,189	37.03%
Republican	Gladys Gardner (incumbent)	3,100	36.00%
Republican	J. S. "Syd" Griffiths	2,322	26.97%
Total votes		8,611	100.00%

General Election Results
Party	Candidate	Votes	%
Republican	Gladys Gardner (incumbent)	10,158	29.25%
Republican	Ray Everett	9,829	28.30%
Democratic	Joseph W. "Joe" Kinateder	7,917	22.80%
Democratic	Merle L. Farmer	6,827	19.66%
Total votes		34,731	100.00%
Republican hold			
Republican hold			

=== District 2 ===
Primary Election Results
Party	Candidate	Votes	%
Democratic Party Primary Results
Democratic	W. L. "Tay" Cook (incumbent)	8,727	18.46%
Democratic	Ed Sawyer (incumbent)	8,422	17.81%
Democratic	H. F. (Hank) Fenn	8,384	17.73%
Democratic	Richard "Dick" Pacheco	8,193	17.33%
Democratic	Woodrow C. Hesser	6,849	14.48%
Democratic	A. L. "Fat" Hawes (incumbent)	6,711	14.19%
Total votes		47,286	100.00%
Republican Party Primary Results
Republican	Kathryn H. Getzwiller	2,553	100.00%
Total votes		2,553	100.00%

General Election Results
Party	Candidate	Votes	%
Democratic	H. F. (Hank) Fenn	15,171	21.86%
Democratic	Richard "Dick" Pacheco	15,163	21.85%
Democratic	W. L. "Tay" Cook (incumbent)	15,135	21.81%
Democratic	Ed Sawyer (incumbent)	14,733	21.23%
Republican	Kathryn H. Getzwiller	9,184	13.24%
Total votes		69,386	100.00%
Democratic hold			
Democratic hold			
Democratic hold			
Democratic hold			

=== District 3 ===
Primary Election Results
Party	Candidate	Votes	%
Democratic Party Primary Results
Democratic	G. O. "Sonny" Biles (incumbent)	5,806	18.99%
Democratic	Boyd A. Shumway	5,683	18.58%
Democratic	Jack A. Brown (incumbent)	5,537	18.11%
Democratic	Lynn Tanner	4,821	15.76%
Democratic	Walter Pulsipher	4,693	15.35%
Democratic	Virgil C. Stuart	4,041	13.21%
Total votes		30,581	100.00%
Republican Party Primary Results
Republican	Drew Shumway	1,744	52.20%
Republican	Nephi W. Bushman	1,597	47.80%
Total votes		3,341	100.00%

General Election Results
Party	Candidate	Votes	%
Democratic	Boyd A. Shumway	10,092	19.16%
Democratic	G. O. "Sonny" Biles (incumbent)	9,960	18.90%
Democratic	Jack A. Brown (incumbent)	9,901	18.79%
Democratic	Lynn Tanner	9,590	18.20%
Republican	Drew Shumway	6,943	13.18%
Republican	Nephi W. Bushman	6,199	11.77%
Total votes		52,685	100.00%
Democratic hold			
Democratic hold			
Democratic hold			
Democratic hold			

=== District 4 ===
Primary Election Results
Party	Candidate	Votes	%
Democratic Party Primary Results
Democratic	Harold L. Huffer (incumbent)	2,730	55.00%
Democratic	Bert W. Baker	2,234	45.00%
Total votes		4,964	100.00%
Republican Party Primary Results
Republican	Sam A. McConnell Jr. (incumbent)	2,009	100.00%
Total votes		2,009	100.00%

General Election Results
Party	Candidate	Votes	%
Republican	Sam A. McConnell Jr. (incumbent)	6,725	43.30%
Democratic	Harold L. Huffer (incumbent)	4,841	31.17%
Democratic	Bert W. Baker	3,964	25.52%
Total votes		15,530	100.00%
Republican hold			
Democratic hold			

=== District 5 ===
Primary Election Results
Party	Candidate	Votes	%
Democratic Party Primary Results
Democratic	Polly Getzwiller (incumbent)	11,053	21.60%
Democratic	E. C. (Polly) Rosenbaum (incumbent)	10,845	21.19%
Democratic	Craig E. Davids	9,897	19.34%
Democratic	Frederick S. Smith (incumbent)	9,826	19.20%
Democratic	Don Haines	9,560	18.68%
Total votes		51,181	100.00%

General Election Results
Party	Candidate	Votes	%
Democratic	E. C. (Polly) Rosenbaum (incumbent)	17,592	25.44%
Democratic	Polly Getzwiller (incumbent)	17,498	25.31%
Democratic	Craig E. Davids	17,128	24.77%
Democratic	Fred S. Smith (incumbent)	16,924	24.48%
Total votes		69,142	100.00%
Democratic hold			
Democratic hold			
Democratic hold			
Democratic hold			

=== District 6 ===
Primary Election Results
Party	Candidate	Votes	%
Democratic Party Primary Results
Democratic	M. G. "Pop" Miniken (incumbent)	4,368	43.42%
Democratic	Charles A. (Charlie) Johnson (incumbent)	4,205	41.80%
Democratic	Sid Hunn	1,486	14.77%
Total votes		10,059	100.00%
Republican Party Primary Results
Republican	Helen Biggers	1,702	100.00%
Total votes		1,702	100.00%

General Election Results
Party	Candidate	Votes	%
Democratic	M. G. "Pop" Miniken (incumbent)	8,695	38.67%
Democratic	Charles A. (Charlie) Johnson (incumbent)	8,139	36.20%
Republican	Helen Biggers	5,652	25.14%
Total votes		22,486	100.00%
Democratic hold			
Democratic hold			

=== District 7-A ===
Primary Election Results
Party	Candidate	Votes	%
Democratic Party Primary Results
Democratic	E. S. "Bud" Walker (incumbent)	3,965	33.12%
Democratic	Bernardo M. "Nayo" Cajero	3,545	29.61%
Democratic	Ralph Baker	2,845	23.76%
Democratic	Vernon C. Elfbrandt	1,617	13.51%
Total votes		11,972	100.00%
Republican Party Primary Results
Republican	Rey Robles	1,545	100.00%
Total votes		1,545	100.00%

General Election Results
Party	Candidate	Votes	%
Democratic	E. S. "Bud" Walker (incumbent)	9,839	41.17%
Democratic	Bernardo M. "Nayo" Cajero	8,950	37.45%
Republican	Rey Robles	5,108	21.38%
Total votes		23,897	100.00%
Democratic hold			
Democratic hold			

=== District 7-B ===
Primary Election Results
Party	Candidate	Votes	%
Democratic Party Primary Results
Democratic	Etta Mae Hutcheson (incumbent)	4,021	54.14%
Democratic	Ethel Maynard (incumbent)	3,406	45.86%
Total votes		7,427	100.00%
Republican Party Primary Results
Republican	Victor J. Borg	1,810	100.00%
Total votes		1,810	100.00%

General Election Results
Party	Candidate	Votes	%
Democratic	Etta Mae Hutcheson (incumbent)	7,770	37.43%
Democratic	Ethel Maynard (incumbent)	6,733	32.44%
Republican	Victor J. Borg	6,254	30.13%
Total votes		20,757	100.00%
Democratic hold			
Democratic hold			

=== District 7-C ===
Primary Election Results
Party	Candidate	Votes	%
Democratic Party Primary Results
Democratic	J. H. "Jim" Dewberry Jr.	4,532	51.04%
Democratic	R. P. "Bob" Fricks (incumbent)	4,347	48.96%
Total votes		8,879	100.00%
Republican Party Primary Results
Republican	James M. Putnam	2,078	38.50%
Republican	Paul R. Ummel	1,965	36.41%
Republican	Walter Frank Dellow	1,354	25.09%
Total votes		5,397	100.00%

General Election Results
Party	Candidate	Votes	%
Democratic	R. P. "Bob" Fricks (incumbent)	8,749	27.89%
Democratic	J. H. "Jim" Dewberry Jr.	8,683	27.68%
Republican	Paul R. Ummel	7,074	22.55%
Republican	James M. Putnam	6,861	21.87%
Total votes		31,367	100.00%
Democratic hold			
Democratic hold			

=== District 7-D ===
Primary Election Results
Party	Candidate	Votes	%
Republican Party Primary Results
Republican	John H. Haugh	3,978	47.88%
Republican	Thomas N. (Tom) Goodwin (incumbent)	3,005	36.17%
Republican	Doris Varn	1,325	15.95%
Total votes		8,308	100.00%

General Election Results
Party	Candidate	Votes	%
Republican	John H. Haugh	11,966	53.74%
Republican	Thomas N. (Tom) Goodwin (incumbent)	10,300	46.26%
Total votes		22,266	100.00%
Republican hold			
Republican hold			

=== District 7-E ===
Primary Election Results
Party	Candidate	Votes	%
Democratic Party Primary Results
Democratic	Ray Martin	3,541	50.99%
Democratic	Bill Risner	3,403	49.01%
Total votes		6,944	100.00%
Republican Party Primary Results
Republican	Albert C. Williams (incumbent)	3,460	50.17%
Republican	David B. Stone (incumbent)	3,436	49.83%
Total votes		6,896	100.00%

General Election Results
Party	Candidate	Votes	%
Republican	David B. Stone (incumbent)	7,926	26.65%
Republican	Albert C. Williams (incumbent)	7,910	26.60%
Democratic	Bill Risner	7,083	23.82%
Democratic	Ray Martin	6,821	22.94%
Total votes		29,740	100.00%
Republican hold			
Republican hold			

=== District 7-F ===
Primary Election Results
Party	Candidate	Votes	%
Democratic Party Primary Results
Democratic	Dan Jacob	3,898	100.00%
Total votes		3,898	100.00%
Republican Party Primary Results
Republican	Scott Alexander (incumbent)	4,886	50.41%
Republican	W. A. "Tony" Buehl (incumbent)	4,806	49.59%
Total votes		9,692	100.00%

General Election Results
Party	Candidate	Votes	%
Republican	Scott Alexander (incumbent)	13,115	40.88%
Republican	W. A. "Tony" Buehl (incumbent)	11,997	37.40%
Democratic	Dan Jacob	6,967	21.72%
Total votes		32,079	100.00%
Republican hold			
Republican hold			

=== District 8-A ===
Primary Election Results
Party	Candidate	Votes	%
Democratic Party Primary Results
Democratic	Belton Hodges	3,409	52.46%
Democratic	Alan J. Cox	3,089	47.54%
Total votes		6,498	100.00%
Republican Party Primary Results
Republican	Walter E. Bloom (incumbent)	3,051	51.29%
Republican	James J. Sossaman	2,897	48.71%
Total votes		5,948	100.00%

General Election Results
Party	Candidate	Votes	%
Republican	Walter E. Bloom (incumbent)	10,907	30.67%
Republican	James J. Sossaman	10,754	30.24%
Democratic	Belton Hodges	7,133	20.06%
Democratic	Alan J. Cox	6,767	19.03%
Total votes		35,561	100.00%
Republican hold			
Republican hold			

=== District 8-B ===
Primary Election Results
Party	Candidate	Votes	%
Republican Party Primary Results
Republican	Stan Turley (incumbent)	3,590	41.06%
Republican	Jim L. Cooper	2,653	30.34%
Republican	Mac C. Matheson	2,501	28.60%
Total votes		8,744	100.00%

General Election Results
Party	Candidate	Votes	%
Republican	Stan Turley (incumbent)	15,279	51.21%
Republican	Jim L. Cooper	14,556	48.79%
Total votes		29,835	100.00%
Republican hold			
Republican hold			

=== District 8-C ===
Primary Election Results
Party	Candidate	Votes	%
Democratic Party Primary Results
Democratic	John Paul Jones	1,981	51.25%
Democratic	Thom Hickey	1,884	48.75%
Total votes		3,865	100.00%
Republican Party Primary Results
Republican	John C. Pritzlaff (incumbent)	5,523	52.05%
Republican	Sam Flake (incumbent)	5,087	47.95%
Total votes		10,610	100.00%

General Election Results
Party	Candidate	Votes	%
Republican	John C. Pritzlaff (incumbent)	16,147	39.08%
Republican	Sam Flake (incumbent)	14,957	36.20%
Democratic	John Paul Jones	5,483	13.27%
Democratic	Thom Hickey	4,731	11.45%
Total votes		41,318	100.00%
Republican hold			
Republican hold			

=== District 8-D ===
Primary Election Results
Party	Candidate	Votes	%
Republican Party Primary Results
Republican	James "Jim" Shelley (incumbent)	3,121	50.29%
Republican	Frank Kelley (incumbent)	3,085	49.71%
Total votes		6,206	100.00%

General Election Results
Party	Candidate	Votes	%
Republican	Frank Kelley (incumbent)	12,217	50.14%
Republican	James "Jim" Shelley (incumbent)	12,151	49.86%
Total votes		24,368	100.00%
Republican hold			
Republican hold			

=== District 8-E ===
Primary Election Results
Party	Candidate	Votes	%
Democratic Party Primary Results
Democratic	R. W. "Duffy" Laidlaw	2,194	100.00%
Total votes		2,194	100.00%
Republican Party Primary Results
Republican	John D. Roeder (incumbent)	4,331	50.09%
Republican	Ruth Adams (incumbent)	4,315	49.91%
Total votes		8,646	100.00%

General Election Results
Party	Candidate	Votes	%
Republican	John D. Roeder (incumbent)	12,405	42.32%
Republican	Ruth Adams (incumbent)	12,253	41.80%
Democratic	R. W. "Duffy" Laidlaw	4,652	15.87%
Total votes		29,310	100.00%
Republican hold			
Republican hold			

=== District 8-F ===
Primary Election Results
Party	Candidate	Votes	%
Democratic Party Primary Results
Democratic	Renz D. Jennings	2,897	39.26%
Democratic	W. F. "Pat" Vipperman (incumbent)	2,352	31.87%
Democratic	Clarence C. Beddome	1,126	15.26%
Democratic	Mrs. Phyllis Maake	1,004	13.61%
Total votes		7,379	100.00%
Republican Party Primary Results
Republican	D. Lee Jones (incumbent)	2,469	58.44%
Republican	Peter J. Foskin	1,756	41.56%
Total votes		4,225	100.00%

General Election Results
Party	Candidate	Votes	%
Republican	D. Lee Jones (incumbent)	7,518	26.18%
Democratic	Renz D. Jennings	7,357	25.62%
Democratic	W. F. "Pat" Vipperman (incumbent)	7,313	25.46%
Republican	Peter J. Foskin	6,532	22.74%
Total votes		28,720	100.00%
Republican hold			
Democratic hold			

=== District 8-G ===
Primary Election Results
Party	Candidate	Votes	%
Democratic Party Primary Results
Democratic	Leon Thompson (incumbent)	2,209	29.96%
Democratic	Tony Abril (incumbent)	2,156	29.24%
Democratic	Leonard F. Walker	1,608	21.81%
Democratic	Robert B. Dawson Jr.	1,401	19.00%
Total votes		7,374	100.00%

General Election Results
Party	Candidate	Votes	%
Democratic	Leon Thompson (incumbent)	8,810	50.09%
Democratic	Tony Abril (incumbent)	8,777	49.91%
Total votes		17,587	100.00%
Democratic hold			
Democratic hold			

=== District 8-H ===
Primary Election Results
Party	Candidate	Votes	%
Democratic Party Primary Results
Democratic	Byron Harvey	2,705	51.70%
Democratic	James C. Borst	2,527	48.30%
Total votes		5,232	100.00%
Republican Party Primary Results
Republican	Jay C. Stuckey (incumbent)	2,874	50.29%
Republican	Elizabeth Adams Rockwell (incumbent)	2,841	49.71%
Total votes		5,715	100.00%

General Election Results
Party	Candidate	Votes	%
Republican	Jay C. Stuckey (incumbent)	9,438	32.69%
Republican	Elizabeth Adams Rockwell (incumbent)	9,146	31.68%
Democratic	James C. Borst	5,251	18.19%
Democratic	Byron Harvey	5,036	17.44%
Total votes		28,871	100.00%
Republican hold			
Republican hold			

=== District 8-I ===
Primary Election Results
Party	Candidate	Votes	%
Democratic Party Primary Results
Democratic	I. "Whitey" Brayer	2,601	100.00%
Total votes		2,601	100.00%
Republican Party Primary Results
Republican	Burton Barr (incumbent)	4,364	50.16%
Republican	Ruth Peck (incumbent)	4,336	49.84%
Total votes		8,700	100.00%

General Election Results
Party	Candidate	Votes	%
Republican	Burton Barr (incumbent)	12,367	41.12%
Republican	Ruth Peck (incumbent)	12,147	40.39%
Democratic	I. "Whitey" Brayer	5,563	18.50%
Total votes		30,077	100.00%
Republican hold			
Republican hold			

=== District 8-J ===
Primary Election Results
Party	Candidate	Votes	%
Democratic Party Primary Results
Democratic	Al Drake	2,005	100.00%
Total votes		2,005	100.00%
Republican Party Primary Results
Republican	Timothy A. Barrow (incumbent)	3,916	50.37%
Republican	Stan Akers (incumbent)	3,859	49.63%
Total votes		7,775	100.00%

General Election Results
Party	Candidate	Votes	%
Republican	Timothy A. Barrow (incumbent)	12,647	42.13%
Republican	Stan Akers (incumbent)	12,438	41.44%
Democratic	Al Drake	4,931	16.43%
Total votes		30,016	100.00%
Republican hold			
Republican hold			

=== District 8-K ===
Primary Election Results
Party	Candidate	Votes	%
Democratic Party Primary Results
Democratic	Fred M. Wilson	2,201	100.00%
Total votes		2,201	100.00%
Republican Party Primary Results
Republican	George J. Palé (incumbent)	3,452	29.56%
Republican	Stuart Schoenburg	3,202	27.42%
Republican	Al Faron (incumbent)	3,107	26.61%
Republican	Richard F. (Dick) Hensley	1,917	16.42%
Total votes		11,678	100.00%

General Election Results
Party	Candidate	Votes	%
Republican	George J. Palé (incumbent)	15,084	41.13%
Republican	Stuart Schoenburg	15,001	40.91%
Democratic	Fred M. Wilson	6,484	17.68%
Independent	Harvey Heyder	102	0.28%
Total votes		36,671	100.00%
Republican hold			
Republican hold			

=== District 8-L ===
Primary Election Results
Party	Candidate	Votes	%
Democratic Party Primary Results
Democratic	M. C. "Mike" Beck	3,549	51.40%
Democratic	Jeanette M. Vaughn	3,356	48.60%
Total votes		6,905	100.00%
Republican Party Primary Results
Republican	Don Stewart	2,275	30.26%
Republican	Joseph (Joe) Shaughnessy Jr. (incumbent)	2,111	28.08%
Republican	Rex J. Farley (incumbent)	1,776	23.62%
Republican	R. D. "Bob" Terry	1,357	18.05%
Total votes		7,519	100.00%

General Election Results
Party	Candidate	Votes	%
Republican	Don Stewart	11,346	31.26%
Republican	Joseph (Joe) Shaughnessy Jr. (incumbent)	11,052	30.45%
Democratic	Jeanette M. Vaughn	7,062	19.46%
Democratic	M. C. "Mike" Beck	6,837	18.84%
Total votes		36,297	100.00%
Republican hold			
Republican hold			

=== District 8-M ===
Primary Election Results
Party	Candidate	Votes	%
Democratic Party Primary Results
Democratic	Betty Bartholomew	2,615	35.59%
Democratic	Jack J. Halperin	2,501	34.04%
Democratic	C. B. (Chuck) Tanner	2,232	30.38%
Total votes		7,348	100.00%
Republican Party Primary Results
Republican	Bess B. Stinson (incumbent)	2,553	52.89%
Republican	Edward C. "Ed" Andrews	2,274	47.11%
Total votes		4,827	100.00%

General Election Results
Party	Candidate	Votes	%
Republican	Bess B. Stinson (incumbent)	9,149	29.19%
Republican	Edward C. "Ed" Andrews	7,914	25.25%
Democratic	Betty Bartholomew	7,743	24.70%
Democratic	Jack J. Halperin	6,541	20.87%
Total votes		31,347	100.00%
Republican hold			
Republican gain from Democratic			

=== District 8-N ===
Primary Election Results
Party	Candidate	Votes	%
Democratic Party Primary Results
Democratic	Manuel "Lito" Peña Jr. (incumbent)	2,702	35.94%
Democratic	Art Coppinger (incumbent)	2,485	33.05%
Democratic	Frank Delise	2,331	31.01%
Total votes		7,518	100.00%
Republican Party Primary Results
Republican	John F. McCauley	1,366	50.78%
Republican	William A. Herron	1,324	49.22%
Total votes		2,690	100.00%

General Election Results
Party	Candidate	Votes	%
Democratic	Art Coppinger (incumbent)	7,887	29.68%
Democratic	Manuel "Lito" Peña Jr. (incumbent)	7,660	28.82%
Republican	John F. McCauley	5,719	21.52%
Republican	William A. Herron	5,311	19.98%
Total votes		26,577	100.00%
Democratic hold			
Democratic hold			

=== District 8-O ===
Primary Election Results
Party	Candidate	Votes	%
Democratic Party Primary Results
Democratic	J. Lee Henry	3,291	100.00%
Total votes		3,291	100.00%
Republican Party Primary Results
Republican	Fred Koory Jr. (incumbent)	2,762	50.42%
Republican	C. W. "Bill" Lewis	2,716	49.58%
Total votes		5,478	100.00%

General Election Results
Party	Candidate	Votes	%
Republican	Fred Koory Jr. (incumbent)	10,133	39.12%
Republican	C. W. "Bill" Lewis	10,097	38.98%
Democratic	J. Lee Henry	5,675	21.91%
Total votes		25,905	100.00%
Republican hold			
Republican hold			
