= Deborah Nardozzi =

American politician

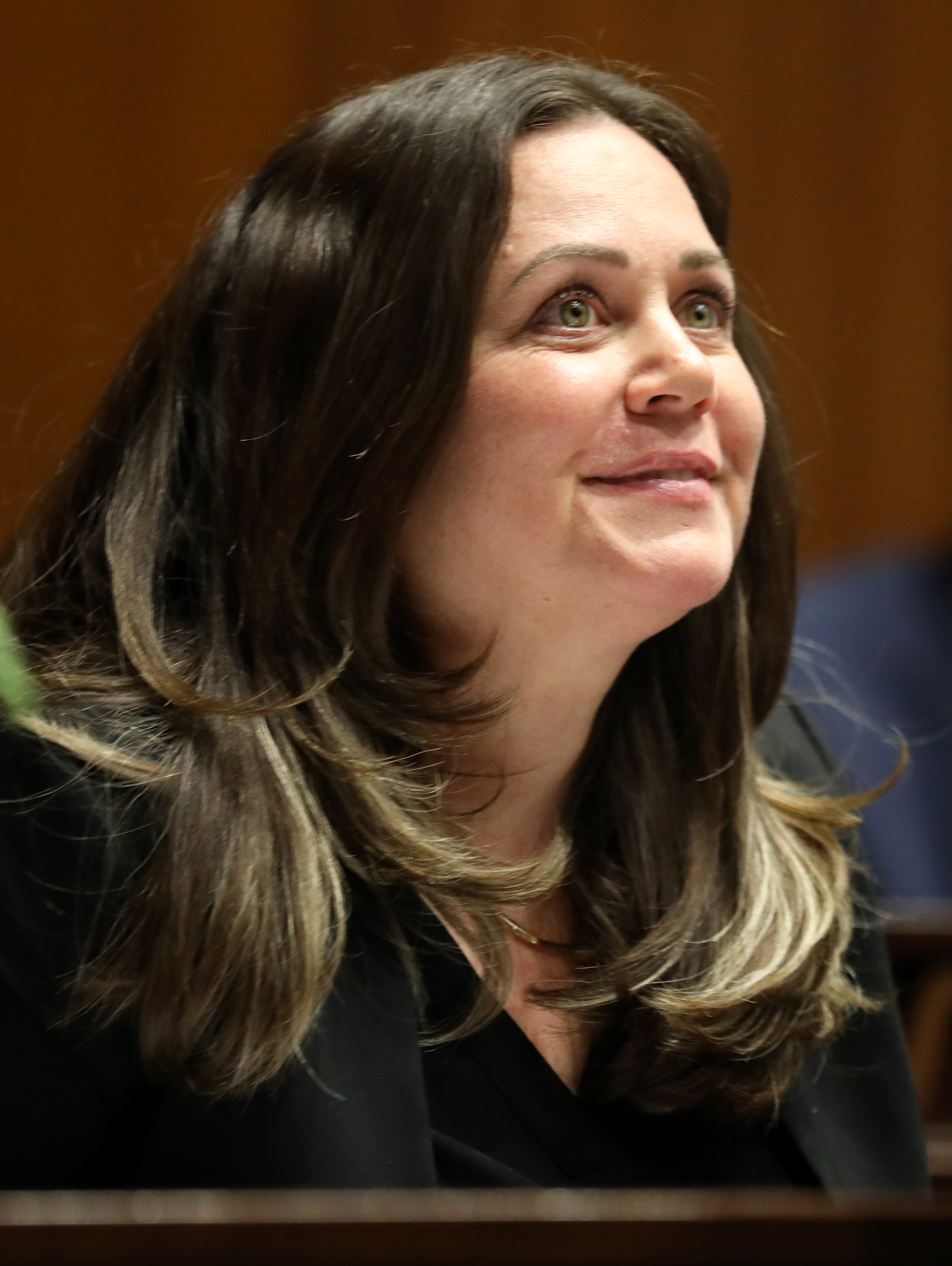

Member of the Arizona House of Representatives from the 8th district
- In office April 4, 2024 – January 13, 2025 Serving with Melody Hernandez
- Preceded by: Jevin Hodge
- Succeeded by: Brian Garcia

Personal details
- Party: Democratic

Deborah Nardozzi is an American political consultant and politician who served as a member for the Arizona House of Representatives for the 8th district. On April 4, 2024, she was sworn in to the position after being appointed by the Maricopa County Board of Supervisors, replacing incumbent Representative Jevin Hodge, who resigned from the position, and did not run for reelection.

== Career ==
Prior to entering elected office, Nardozzi was the owner of Ta Da Agency, "a campaign, lifestyle, events and travel consulting business," which she has operated for over 15 years. Additionally, she has served as a campaign manager and advisor, and as an executive assistant for a law firm based in Washington, D.C.

On April 3, 2024, she was announced by the Maricopa County Board of Supervisors to have been selected for appointment to the Arizona House of Representatives, and was sworn in the following day. Nardozzi replaced incumbent Representative Jevin Hodge, who resigned after being appointed to the position just over a month prior.

Nardozzi did not run for reelection in 2024, but she did seek the Democratic nomination for the Arizona Senate when Melody Hernandez withdrew from the primary due to challenges to her nominating signatures. Local party precinct committee members voted instead to select Lauren Kuby on a 39-28 vote margin.
