= Jevin Hodge =

American politician

Jevin D. Hodge
- Hodge in 2026

Member of the Arizona House of Representatives from the 8th district
- In office February 2, 2024 – March 19, 2024 Serving with Melody Hernandez
- Preceded by: Athena Salman
- Succeeded by: Deborah Nardozzi

Personal details
- Born: December 15, 1993 (age 32) Tempe, Arizona, U.S.
- Party: Democratic
- Education: George Washington University (BA)

Jevin Davon Hodge is an American political strategist, business executive, nonprofit leader, and former politician. A member of the Democratic Party, he served in the Arizona House of Representatives for the 8th legislative district from February 2 to March 19, 2024. He previously served as vice chairman of the Arizona Democratic Party and was the Democratic nominee for Arizona's 1st congressional district in the 2022 United States House of Representatives election, losing to incumbent Republican David Schweikert by fewer than 3,200 votes.

Hodge has worked in political campaign management, strategic communications, public affairs, and organizational consulting. He is the founder and chief executive officer of Amplify Global Impact Group, a consulting firm focused on public affairs, stakeholder engagement, strategic planning, and social impact. He previously held a senior national engagement and partnerships position at LINK Strategic Partners.

In addition to his political and business career, Hodge has held leadership roles in education, civil rights, and nonprofit organizations. He is president of the East Valley branch of the NAACP, president of the board of the Booker T. Washington Child Development Center, and a leader of Larry Thomas Youth Development. His public service has also included involvement in youth civic engagement, international partnerships, and educational advocacy.

Hodge's legislative tenure ended in March 2024 following reporting that a George Washington University disciplinary process had found him in violation of its sexual misconduct policies over a 2015 incident. Hodge disputed the allegations and resigned from office after the findings became public.

== Early life and education ==
Hodge was born and raised in Tempe, Arizona, the eldest son of Berdetta Hodge. He and his younger brother were raised by their mother, who subsequently became an elected education official and a member of the Tempe City Council.

Hodge has described growing up in a working-class, single-parent household and experiencing economic hardship. During his 2022 congressional campaign, he discussed his family's reliance on public assistance and his experience attending college with financial aid. These experiences influenced his public positions on education, economic opportunity, and access to government services.

He attended McClintock High School in Tempe and became involved in local civic activities as a teenager. His early involvement included participation in Tempe's Mayor's Youth Advisory Commission and community-service initiatives. Former Tempe councilmember and mayor Corey Woods, who knew Hodge as a teenager, described his early interest in municipal government and community affairs in a 2017 Cronkite News profile.

In 2012, while a senior at McClintock High School, Hodge helped develop legislation recognizing high school students who completed substantial community service. Working with Arizona legislator David Schapira, he proposed a measure that passed both chambers of the Arizona Legislature with bipartisan support. Republican Governor Jan Brewer subsequently vetoed the bill, arguing that its requirements were unnecessary. Hodge would revisit the proposal more than a decade later as a state legislator.

Hodge attended George Washington University in Washington, D.C., where he earned a bachelor's degree in public policy in 2016. He subsequently undertook graduate studies in political management.

== Political career ==
=== Early political involvement and campaign strategy ===
Hodge began working in political campaigns and community organizing as a teenager. His early political work included voter engagement, candidate outreach, campaign administration, and youth participation in electoral politics.

By 2017, he had managed more than six state and local political campaigns in Arizona and Washington, D.C. His campaign experience included the successful 2016 election of his mother, Berdetta Hodge, to the Tempe Union High School District governing board.

In 2017, at age 23, Hodge was elected vice chairman of the Arizona Democratic Party. His election was part of a broader effort within the party to recruit younger leaders and strengthen organizing among emerging generations of voters. Cronkite News profiled Hodge that year as a young party official who emphasized community relationships, volunteerism, and participation in the political process.

His work as a party official included political organizing, fundraising, and participation in electoral campaigns. He advocated for greater participation by young people and communities historically underrepresented in elected office.

=== 2020 Maricopa County Board of Supervisors election ===
In 2020, Hodge was the Democratic nominee for the District 1 seat on the Maricopa County Board of Supervisors, challenging Republican incumbent Jack Sellers.

The campaign took place during a closely contested election cycle in Maricopa County, Arizona's most populous county.

According to the official election canvass, Sellers received 212,252 votes, while Hodge received 211,849 votes. Hodge lost by 403 votes, a margin of approximately 0.1 percentage points.

The race became an important part of Hodge's subsequent political career. When the Maricopa County Board of Supervisors later appointed him to the Arizona Legislature in 2024, Sellers publicly recalled their contest and praised Hodge's involvement in his hometown of Tempe.

=== 2022 United States House of Representatives election ===
In May 2021, Hodge announced his candidacy for the United States House of Representatives. He sought the Democratic nomination in Arizona's 1st congressional district, challenging incumbent Republican David Schweikert.

Hodge campaigned on access to health care, public education, economic opportunity, voting rights, infrastructure, and environmental sustainability. His campaign also emphasized his background in a lower-income household and his experience in nonprofit leadership.

Hodge won the Democratic primary and faced Schweikert in the November 2022 general election. The newly configured district included Scottsdale, Paradise Valley, Cave Creek, Fountain Hills, and several communities and tribal reservations in the northeastern Phoenix metropolitan area.

The campaign received attention from national political observers as the contest became increasingly competitive. The Cook Political Report classified the race as a toss-up during the final months of the election. Had he won, Hodge would have become Arizona's first Black member of Congress.

Federal Election Commission records indicate that Hodge's campaign committee received approximately $2.57 million during the 2021–2022 election cycle.

Schweikert ultimately won reelection with 182,336 votes to Hodge's 179,141, a margin of 3,195 votes, or approximately 0.88 percentage points.

A February 2023 analysis in The New Republic identified the Arizona race as one of several narrowly lost Democratic opportunities in the battle for control of the U.S. House. The article examined national campaign spending decisions and the comparatively limited support provided to Hodge's campaign by national Democratic organizations.

=== Arizona House of Representatives ===
On January 31, 2024, the Maricopa County Board of Supervisors appointed Hodge to fill the vacancy in Arizona's 8th legislative district created by the resignation of Democratic representative Athena Salman.

The district included portions of Tempe, Phoenix, Scottsdale, and the Salt River Pima-Maricopa Indian Community. Hodge was sworn into office on February 2, 2024.

During his brief tenure, Hodge served on legislative committees concerned with government and transportation and infrastructure.

One of his legislative priorities was House Bill 2824, which proposed a state commendation for high school students completing at least 200 hours of community service. The measure revisited legislation he had helped propose as a high school senior in 2012.

The proposal attracted Republican and Democratic co-sponsors and passed the Arizona House of Representatives with bipartisan support in February 2024. KJZZ reported on the unusual circumstances of Hodge returning to the Capitol as an elected official to sponsor a version of the legislation he had first developed as a teenager.

The bill advanced to the Arizona Senate but did not become law.

Hodge also co-sponsored legislation addressing educational administration, election procedures, and funding for the Arizona Commission of African-American Affairs.

His legislative service ended on March 19, 2024, following the disclosure of findings from a university disciplinary proceeding concerning a 2015 incident.

== Business and consulting career ==
=== LINK Strategic Partners ===
Hodge pursued a professional career in strategic communications, public affairs, and consulting alongside his political and nonprofit activities.

He worked at LINK Strategic Partners, a consulting firm operating in strategic communications, public affairs, organizational strategy, and stakeholder engagement. He held senior roles in national engagement and partnerships, working with public-sector organizations, nonprofit institutions, and private businesses.

His professional focus included engagement with elected officials, community stakeholders, business organizations, and institutional leaders.

His career at LINK formed part of his broader involvement in the intersection of government relations, political strategy, and organizational leadership.

=== Amplify Global Impact Group ===
Hodge subsequently founded Amplify Global Impact Group, a consulting firm working in public affairs, strategic communications, stakeholder engagement, strategic planning, and social impact.

The firm describes its work as assisting government entities, nonprofits, businesses, and mission-driven institutions in developing organizational strategies, engaging stakeholders, building partnerships, and implementing public-facing initiatives.

As founder and chief executive officer, Hodge has continued working across the public, nonprofit, and private sectors.

His consulting work has included an emphasis on collaboration between organizations, policymakers, and communities, reflecting the relationship-focused approach described in reporting on his early political career.

== Nonprofit leadership and community service ==
=== Early childhood education and the Booker T. Washington Child Development Center ===
Hodge has been involved in early childhood education and nonprofit governance through the Booker T. Washington Child Development Center in Phoenix, Arizona.

He serves as president of the organization's board of directors. The center provides early childhood education and family-support services through Head Start programming, serving children and families from lower-income communities.

The organization operates one of Arizona's longest-established Head Start programs. In addition to educational instruction, its services include health, nutrition, disability support, family engagement, and assistance connecting families with social services.

Hodge's involvement in the organization predates his campaigns for county and federal office. His work in early childhood education was highlighted in reporting on his 2022 congressional campaign and in the official announcement of his appointment to the Arizona Legislature.

=== Civil rights leadership and the NAACP ===
In November 2024, Hodge was elected president of the East Valley branch of the National Association for the Advancement of Colored People (NAACP), for a two-year term beginning January 1, 2025.

The branch serves multiple communities in the eastern Phoenix metropolitan area, including Tempe, Mesa, Scottsdale, Gilbert, Queen Creek, Fountain Hills, Apache Junction, and Ahwatukee.

As president, Hodge has been involved in the branch's civil rights advocacy, community outreach, education, and economic-opportunity initiatives.

His public activities have included convening discussions involving public officials, educational institutions, business organizations, and community representatives. In 2026, he participated in a higher-education discussion organized with EdSights on improving student-support systems in Arizona.

=== Youth development and education governance ===
Hodge previously served as president of the Tempe Union High School Education Foundation, an organization supporting public education within the school district he attended.

He has also held leadership roles in Larry Thomas Youth Development, an Arizona nonprofit focused on youth mentorship, development, and access to educational opportunities. The organization lists him as its president and chief executive officer.

Earlier in his career, Hodge was involved with the Manifesto Project, an Arizona-based organization concerned with civic participation and the development and retention of young professionals.

He has also served on nonprofit and advisory boards connected with social services, education, and international engagement.

== International partnerships and civic engagement ==
Hodge's professional and nonprofit activities have included international leadership initiatives and cross-sector partnerships.

He has been involved with the Festival of the Diaspora, an organization that convenes leaders from across the Americas to discuss economic development, community investment, entrepreneurship, and international collaboration. The organization lists him among its board advisers, while other organizational biographies have identified him as a board chair.

Hodge has also served in a leadership capacity with the Rolling Sea Action Fund, a political action committee focused on electoral participation and support for Black political candidates.

In 2026, Hodge participated in Arizona business and innovation discussions organized through Global Chamber, including events addressing the semiconductor industry, workforce development, and the state's expanding technology economy.

== Honors and recognition ==
Hodge has received recognition from civic, civil rights, and educational organizations for his public and community service.

His publicly documented honors include the City of Tempe's Martin Luther King Jr. service recognition and an East Valley NAACP Roy Wilkins Service Award, both referenced in Maricopa County's official biographical announcement concerning his legislative appointment.

His Arizona Legislature biography also lists recognition from Grambling State University and the Maricopa County NAACP.

== 2015 university disciplinary findings and 2024 resignation ==
On March 18, 2024, The Arizona Republic published reporting about a 2015 incident involving Hodge and another student at George Washington University.

According to documents reviewed by the newspaper, the woman reported that an encounter, initially consensual, developed into unwanted sexual contact. The university investigated the complaint and found that Hodge violated its sexual violence and sexual misconduct policies. The disciplinary action included a one-month suspension from university property.

The reporting described allegations of physical advances, including grabbing and pulling the woman's hair, during the encounter. Hodge disputed the characterization of the incident, maintaining that the interaction was consensual and that he stopped when the woman indicated she did not want to continue.

In a public statement, Hodge denied the allegations and acknowledged that the university proceedings had caused distress. He also stated that he had sought further investigation of the incident.

On March 19, 2024, one day after the newspaper's report, Hodge resigned from the Arizona House of Representatives. He continued to deny the allegations but stated that he believed stepping aside was appropriate under the circumstances.

Arizona House Democratic leadership accepted his resignation.

== Personal life ==
Hodge is a native of Tempe, Arizona, and is the son of Tempe City Council member Berdetta Hodge.

His family background and upbringing in Arizona have been recurring subjects in news coverage and in his public discussions of education, economic mobility, and civic service.
