= 1968 Arizona Senate election =

- November 5, 1968

All 30 seats of the Arizona Senate 16 seats needed for a majority
	Majority party	Minority party
Party	Republican	Democratic
Seats before	16	14
Seats after	17	13
Seat change	▲1	▼1
Senate President before election
Marshall Humphrey
Republican
Elected Senate President
William S. (Bill) Porter
Republican

The 1968 Arizona Senate election was held on November 5, 1968. Voters elected all 30 members of the Arizona Senate to serve two-year terms.

Primary elections were held on September 10, 1968.

Prior to the elections, the Republicans held a majority of 16 seats over the 14 seats held by Democrats.

Following the election, Republicans maintained control of the chamber and expanded their majority to 17 Republicans to 13 Democrats, a net gain of one seat for Republicans.

The newly elected senators served in the 29th Arizona State Legislature.

== Retiring Incumbents ==
=== Democrats ===
1. District 2: Dan S. Kitchel, Senator from Cochise County.
2. District 2: A. R. Spikes, Senator from Cochise County.
3. District 5: John Gregovich, Senator from Gila County. (Note: Democratic Senator Clarence L. Carpenter of Gila County died on February 7, 1967. The Gila County Board of Supervisors appointed Mr. John Gregovich to succeed Senator Carpenter.)

=== Republicans ===
1. District 8-A: Marshall Humphrey, Senator from Maricopa County.
2. District 8-I: Chet Goldberg Jr., Senator from Maricopa County.

== Incumbents Defeated in Primary Elections ==
=== Democrats ===
1. District 3: Glenn Blansett, Senator from Navajo County.
2. District 8-F: Wing F. Ong, Senator from Maricopa County.
3. District 8-M: William T. "Bill" Crowley, Senator from Maricopa County.

== Incumbents Defeated in General Elections ==
=== Republicans ===
1. District 7-C: Ernest Garfield, Senator from Pima County.

== Summary of Results by Arizona State Legislative District ==
District	Incumbent	Party	Elected Senator	Outcome
1st	Boyd Tenney	Rep	Boyd Tenney	Rep Hold
2nd	A. R. Spikes	Dem	James A. "Jim" Elliott	Dem Hold
2nd	Dan S. Kitchel	Dem	James F. McNulty Jr.	Dem Hold
3rd	William "Bill" Huso	Dem	William "Bill" Huso	Dem Hold
3rd	Glenn Blansett	Dem	Frank L. Crosby	Dem Hold
4th	Thomas M. "Tommy" Knoles Jr.	Dem	Thomas M. "Tommy" Knoles Jr.	Dem Hold
5th	E. B. "Blodie" Thode	Dem	E. B. "Blodie" Thode	Dem Hold
5th	John Gregovich	Dem	A V. "Bill" Hardt	Dem Hold
6th	Harold C. Giss	Dem	Harold C. Giss	Dem Hold
7-A	Joe Castillo	Dem	Joe Castillo	Dem Hold
7-B	F. T. "Limie" Gibbings	Dem	F. T. "Limie" Gibbings	Dem Hold
7-C	Ernest Garfield	Rep	Sam Lena	Dem Gain
7-D	Douglas S. Holsclaw	Rep	Douglas S. Holsclaw	Rep Hold
7-E	Kenneth C. Cardella (Note: Republican Senator Thomas G. Beaham of Pima County died on May 2, 1967. The Pima County Board of Supervisors appointed Mr. Kenneth C. Cardella to succeed Senator Beaham.)	Rep	Kenneth C. Cardella	Rep Hold
7-F	William C. Jacquin	Rep	William C. Jacquin	Rep Hold
8-A	Marshall Humphrey	Rep	James F. Holley	Rep Hold
8-B	William S. (Bill) Porter	Rep	William S. (Bill) Porter	Rep Hold
8-C	John B. Conlan	Rep	John B. Conlan	Rep Hold
8-D	David B. Kret	Rep	David B. Kret	Rep Hold
8-E	Isabel Burgess	Rep	Isabel Burgess	Rep Hold
8-F	Wing F. Ong	Dem	Mike Farren	Rep Gain
8-G	Cloves C. Campbell	Dem	Cloves C. Campbell	Dem Hold
8-H	Orme Lewis Jr.	Rep	Orme Lewis Jr.	Rep Hold
8-I	Chet Goldberg Jr.	Rep	Somers White	Rep Hold
8-J	Bob Wilcox	Rep	Bob Wilcox	Rep Hold
8-K	Ray A. Goetze	Rep	Ray A. Goetze	Rep Hold
8-L	Christopher T. "Chris" Johnson	Rep	Christopher T. "Chris" Johnson	Rep Hold
8-M	William T. "Bill" Crowley	Dem	Terry Jones	Rep Gain
8-N	Bob Stump	Dem	Bob Stump	Dem Hold
8-O	Dan Halacy	Rep	Dan Halacy	Rep Hold

== Detailed Results ==
=== District 1 ===
Republican primary results
Party	Candidate	Votes	%
Republican	Boyd Tenney (incumbent)	4,354	100.00%
Total votes		4,354	100.00%

General election results
Party	Candidate	Votes	%
Republican	Boyd Tenney (incumbent)	12,691	100.00%
Total votes		12,691	100.00%
Republican hold			

=== District 2 ===
- District 2 elected two Senators at the time.

Democratic primary results
Party	Candidate	Votes	%
Democratic	James F. McNulty Jr.	8,845	36.17%
Democratic	James A. "Jim" Elliott	8,394	34.32%
Democratic	John Mickelson	7,218	29.51%
Total votes		24,457	100.00%

General election results
Party	Candidate	Votes	%
Democratic	James F. McNulty Jr.	15,616	50.06%
Democratic	James A. "Jim" Elliott	15,578	49.94%
Total votes		31,194	100.00%
Democratic hold			
Democratic hold			

=== District 3 ===
- District 3 elected two Senators at the time.

Democratic primary results
Party	Candidate	Votes	%
Democratic	William "Bill" Huso (incumbent)	5,086	29.16%
Democratic	Frank L. Crosby	4,587	26.30%
Democratic	Glenn Blansett (incumbent)	4,400	25.23%
Democratic	Milford Hall	3,369	19.32%
Total votes		17,442	100.00%

Republican primary results
Party	Candidate	Votes	%
Republican	LeRoy A. Palmer	1,872	100.00%
Total votes		1,872	100.00%

General election results
Party	Candidate	Votes	%
Democratic	William "Bill" Huso (incumbent)	10,053	37.22%
Democratic	Frank L. Crosby	10,035	37.15%
Republican	LeRoy A. Palmer	6,922	25.63%
Total votes		27,010	100.00%
Democratic hold			
Democratic hold			

=== District 4 ===
Democratic primary results
Party	Candidate	Votes	%
Democratic	Thomas M. (Tommy) Knoles Jr. (incumbent)	3,250	100.00%
Total votes		3,250	100.00%

General election results
Party	Candidate	Votes	%
Democratic	Thomas M. (Tommy) Knoles Jr. (incumbent)	5,747	100.00%
Total votes		5,747	100.00%
Democratic hold			

=== District 5 ===
- District 5 elected two Senators at the time.

Democratic primary results
Party	Candidate	Votes	%
Democratic	A. V. "Bill" Hardt	12,620	51.17%
Democratic	E. B. "Blodie" Thode (incumbent)	12,041	48.83%
Total votes		24,661	100.00%

General election results
Party	Candidate	Votes	%
Democratic	A. V. "Bill" Hardt	17,543	50.83%
Democratic	E. B. "Blodie" Thode (incumbent)	16,973	49.17%
Total votes		34,516	100.00%
Democratic hold			
Democratic hold			

=== District 6 ===
Democratic primary results
Party	Candidate	Votes	%
Democratic	Harold C. Giss (incumbent)	5,509	100.00%
Total votes		5,509	100.00%

General election results
Party	Candidate	Votes	%
Democratic	Harold C. Giss (incumbent)	10,230	100.00%
Total votes		10,230	100.00%
Democratic hold			

=== District 7-A ===
Democratic primary results
Party	Candidate	Votes	%
Democratic	Joe Castillo (incumbent)	3,904	52.23%
Democratic	Eddie Jacobs	3,094	41.40%
Democratic	Ernie Soto Navarro	476	6.37%
Total votes		7,474	100.00%

General election results
Party	Candidate	Votes	%
Democratic	Joe Castillo (incumbent)	10,849	100.00%
Total votes		10,849	100.00%
Democratic hold			

=== District 7-B ===
Democratic primary results
Party	Candidate	Votes	%
Democratic	F. T. (Limie) Gibbings (incumbent)	4,037	100.00%
Total votes		4,037	100.00%

General election results
Party	Candidate	Votes	%
Democratic	F. T. (Limie) Gibbings (incumbent)	8,357	100.00%
Total votes		8,357	100.00%
Democratic hold			

=== District 7-C ===
Democratic primary results
Party	Candidate	Votes	%
Democratic	Sam Lena	5,289	100.00%
Total votes		5,289	100.00%

Republican primary results
Party	Candidate	Votes	%
Republican	Ernest Garfield (incumbent)	2,793	100.00%
Total votes		2,793	100.00%

General election results
Party	Candidate	Votes	%
Democratic	Sam Lena	8,839	52.36%
Republican	Ernest Garfield (incumbent)	8,043	47.64%
Total votes		16,882	100.00%
Democratic gain from Republican			

=== District 7-D ===
Republican primary results
Party	Candidate	Votes	%
Republican	Douglas S. Holsclaw (incumbent)	3,190	68.29%
Republican	W. Kile Jarvis	1,481	31.71%
Total votes		4,671	100.00%

General election results
Party	Candidate	Votes	%
Republican	Douglas S. Holsclaw (incumbent)	11,649	100.00%
Total votes		11,649	100.00%
Republican hold			

=== District 7-E ===
Democratic primary results
Party	Candidate	Votes	%
Democratic	Marvin Bell	3,895	100.00%
Total votes		3,895	100.00%

Republican primary results
Party	Candidate	Votes	%
Republican	Ken Cardella (incumbent)	3,458	100.00%
Total votes		3,458	100.00%

General election results
Party	Candidate	Votes	%
Republican	Ken Cardella (incumbent)	8,748	56.92%
Democratic	Marvin Bell	6,621	43.08%
Total votes		15,369	100.00%
Republican hold			

=== District 7-F ===
Democratic primary results
Party	Candidate	Votes	%
Democratic	Ross Gomez	3,919	100.00%
Total votes		3,919	100.00%

Republican primary results
Party	Candidate	Votes	%
Republican	William C. Jacquin (incumbent)	4,985	100.00%
Total votes		4,985	100.00%

General election results
Party	Candidate	Votes	%
Republican	William C. Jacquin (incumbent)	11,726	62.67%
Democratic	Ross Gomez	6,985	37.33%
Total votes		18,711	100.00%
Republican hold			

=== District 8-A ===
Democratic primary results
Party	Candidate	Votes	%
Democratic	Bob Winters	3,562	100.00%
Total votes		3,562	100.00%

Republican primary results
Party	Candidate	Votes	%
Republican	James F. Holley	3,087	100.00%
Total votes		3,087	100.00%

General election results
Party	Candidate	Votes	%
Republican	James F. Holley	10,467	58.27%
Democratic	Bob Winters	7,495	41.73%
Total votes		17,962	100.00%
Republican hold			

=== District 8-B ===
Democratic primary results
Party	Candidate	Votes	%
Democratic	Joseph S. Jarvis	2,299	100.00%
Total votes		2,299	100.00%

Republican primary results
Party	Candidate	Votes	%
Republican	William S. (Bill) Porter (incumbent)	4,325	100.00%
Total votes		4,325	100.00%

General election results
Party	Candidate	Votes	%
Republican	William S. (Bill) Porter (incumbent)	14,603	74.86%
Democratic	Joseph S. Jarvis	4,905	25.14%
Total votes		19,508	100.00%
Republican hold			

=== District 8-C ===
Democratic primary results
Party	Candidate	Votes	%
Democratic	Guy Stillman	2,175	100.00%
Total votes		2,175	100.00%

Republican primary results
Party	Candidate	Votes	%
Republican	John B. Conlan (incumbent)	5,245	100.00%
Total votes		5,245	100.00%

General election results
Party	Candidate	Votes	%
Republican	John B. Conlan (incumbent)	14,161	66.48%
Democratic	Guy Stillman	7,139	33.52%
Total votes		21,300	100.00%
Republican hold			

=== District 8-D ===
Republican primary results
Party	Candidate	Votes	%
Republican	David B. Kret (incumbent)	3,112	100.00%
Total votes		3,112	100.00%

General election results
Party	Candidate	Votes	%
Republican	David B. Kret (incumbent)	12,302	100.00%
Total votes		12,302	100.00%
Republican hold			

=== District 8-E ===
Democratic primary results
Party	Candidate	Votes	%
Democratic	Robert Edwards	2,313	100.00%
Total votes		2,313	100.00%

Republican primary results
Party	Candidate	Votes	%
Republican	Isabel Burgess (incumbent)	4,425	100.00%
Total votes		4,425	100.00%

General election results
Party	Candidate	Votes	%
Republican	Isabel Burgess (incumbent)	12,639	72.31%
Democratic	Robert Edwards	4,841	27.69%
Total votes		17,480	100.00%
Republican hold			

=== District 8-F ===
Democratic primary results
Party	Candidate	Votes	%
Democratic	Archie C. Ryan	2,171	50.81%
Democratic	Wing F. Ong (incumbent)	2,102	49.19%
Total votes		4,273	100.00%

Republican primary results
Party	Candidate	Votes	%
Republican	Mike Farren	1,608	60.45%
Republican	Edwin J. Egan	1,052	39.55%
Total votes		2,660	100.00%

General election results
Party	Candidate	Votes	%
Republican	Mike Farren	7,585	53.51%
Democratic	Archie C. Ryan	6,590	46.49%
Total votes		14,175	100.00%
Republican gain from Democratic			

=== District 8-G ===
Democratic primary results
Party	Candidate	Votes	%
Democratic	Cloves C. Campbell (incumbent)	2,524	49.70%
Democratic	Adam Diaz	1,832	36.08%
Democratic	Mrs. Izora Hill	454	8.94%
Democratic	M. L. Manuel	268	5.28%
Total votes		5,078	100.00%

General election results
Party	Candidate	Votes	%
Democratic	Cloves C. Campbell (incumbent)	9,004	100.00%
Total votes		9,004	100.00%
Democratic hold			

=== District 8-H ===
Democratic primary results
Party	Candidate	Votes	%
Democratic	John B. Haldiman	3,116	100.00%
Total votes		3,116	100.00%

Republican primary results
Party	Candidate	Votes	%
Republican	Orme Lewis Jr. (incumbent)	3,009	100.00%
Total votes		3,009	100.00%

General election results
Party	Candidate	Votes	%
Republican	Orme Lewis Jr. (incumbent)	9,170	61.70%
Democratic	John B. Haldiman	5,692	38.30%
Total votes		14,862	100.00%
Republican hold			

=== District 8-I ===
Republican primary results
Party	Candidate	Votes	%
Republican	Somers White	3,225	64.33%
Republican	Virginia A. Troster	1,788	35.67%
Total votes		5,013	100.00%

General election results
Party	Candidate	Votes	%
Republican	Somers White	12,747	100.00%
Total votes		12,747	100.00%
Republican hold			

=== District 8-J ===
Republican primary results
Party	Candidate	Votes	%
Republican	Bob Wilcox (incumbent)	4,039	100.00%
Total votes		4,039	100.00%

General election results
Party	Candidate	Votes	%
Republican	Bob Wilcox (incumbent)	12,938	97.04%
Fair Tax Equalization	John Michael Morris	394	2.96%
Total votes		13,332	100.00%
Republican hold			

=== District 8-K ===
Democratic primary results
Party	Candidate	Votes	%
Democratic	Edward D. Lewis	2,133	100.00%
Total votes		2,133	100.00%

Republican primary results
Party	Candidate	Votes	%
Republican	Ray A. Goetze (incumbent)	5,637	100.00%
Total votes		5,637	100.00%

General election results
Party	Candidate	Votes	%
Republican	Ray A. Goetze (incumbent)	15,278	71.00%
Democratic	Edward D. Lewis	6,240	29.00%
Total votes		21,518	100.00%
Republican hold			

=== District 8-L ===
Democratic primary results
Party	Candidate	Votes	%
Democratic	L. J. "Jim" Grube	3,552	100.00%
Total votes		3,552	100.00%

Republican primary results
Party	Candidate	Votes	%
Republican	Christopher T. "Chris" Johnson (incumbent)	2,890	70.27%
Republican	Dr. Wayne Howard Stump, D. C.	1,223	29.73%
Total votes		4,113	100.00%

General election results
Party	Candidate	Votes	%
Republican	Christopher T. "Chris" Johnson (incumbent)	12,605	68.28%
Democratic	L. J. "Jim" Grube	5,855	31.72%
Total votes		18,460	100.00%
Republican hold			

=== District 8-M ===
Democratic primary results
Party	Candidate	Votes	%
Democratic	Dr. Al Frantz	2,211	45.40%
Democratic	Bob Rickard	1,572	32.28%
Democratic	William T. "Bill" Crowley (incumbent)	1,087	22.32%
Total votes		4,870	100.00%

Republican primary results
Party	Candidate	Votes	%
Republican	Terry Jones	1,893	64.98%
Republican	Walter Chopiwskyj	1,020	35.02%
Total votes		2,913	100.00%

General election results
Party	Candidate	Votes	%
Republican	Terry Jones	8,605	55.33%
Democratic	Dr. Al Frantz	6,946	44.67%
Total votes		15,551	100.00%
Republican gain from Democratic			

=== District 8-N ===
Democratic primary results
Party	Candidate	Votes	%
Democratic	Bob Stump (incumbent)	3,833	100.00%
Total votes		3,833	100.00%

Republican primary results
Party	Candidate	Votes	%
Republican	James Forrest	1,339	100.00%
Total votes		1,339	100.00%

General election results
Party	Candidate	Votes	%
Democratic	Bob Stump (incumbent)	8,539	63.74%
Republican	James Forrest	4,858	36.26%
Total votes		13,397	100.00%
Democratic hold			

=== District 8-O ===
Democratic primary results
Party	Candidate	Votes	%
Democratic	P. A. "Joe" Silva	1,976	51.65%
Democratic	John A. Fresco	1,850	48.35%
Total votes		3,826	100.00%

Republican primary results
Party	Candidate	Votes	%
Republican	Dan Halacy (incumbent)	2,852	100.00%
Total votes		2,852	100.00%

General election results
Party	Candidate	Votes	%
Republican	Dan Halacy (incumbent)	10,163	63.91%
Democratic	P. A. "Joe" Silva	5,738	36.09%
Total votes		15,901	100.00%
Republican hold			
