= 1966 Arizona Senate election =

- November 8, 1966

All 30 seats of the Arizona Senate (Note: Following the landmark Reynolds v. Sims (1964) US Supreme Court decision, every state had to redraw state electoral districts to be approximately equal in population. Before Reynolds, the Arizona Senate consisted of 28 members with two elected Senators from each of the state's 14 counties. After the ruling, the Arizona Senate shifted to electoral districts.) 16 seats needed for a majority
	Majority party	Minority party
Party	Republican	Democratic
Seats before	2	26
Seats after	16	14
Seat change	▲14	▼12
Senate President before election
Clarence L. Carpenter
Democratic
Elected Senate President
Marshall Humphrey
Republican

The 1966 Arizona Senate election was held on November 8, 1966. Voters elected all 30 members of the Arizona Senate to serve two-year terms. Following the landmark Reynolds v. Sims (1964) US Supreme Court decision, every state had to redraw state electoral districts to be approximately equal in population. Before Reynolds, the Arizona Senate consisted of 28 members with two elected Senators from each of the state's 14 counties. After the ruling, the Arizona Senate shifted to electoral districts.

Primary elections were held on September 13, 1966.

Prior to the elections, the Democrats held a supermajority of 26 seats over the 2 Republican seats.

Following the election, Republicans flipped control of the chamber and took a majority of 16 Republicans to 14 Democrats, a net gain of 14 seats for Republicans.

The newly elected senators served in the 28th Arizona State Legislature.

== Retiring Incumbents ==
=== Democrats ===
1. District 1: Earle W. Cook, Senator from Mohave County.
2. District 1: Robert E. Morrow, Senator from Mohave County.
3. District 1: David H. Palmer, Senator from Yavapai County.
4. District 2: Darvil B. McBride, Senator from Graham County.
5. District 2: Robert Hathaway, Senator from Santa Cruz County.
6. District 2: C. B. (Bert) Smith, Senator from Santa Cruz County.
7. District 3: John W. (Mac) McLaughlin, Senator from Greenlee County.
8. District 3: M. L. (Marshall) Simms, Senator from Greenlee County.
9. District 4: Fred F. Udine, Senator from Coconino County.
10. District 5: William A. Sullivan, Senator from Gila County.
11. District 7: Edward I. Kennedy, Senator from Pima County.

== Incumbents Defeated in Primary Elections ==
=== Democrats ===
1. District 2: John Mickelson, Senator from Graham County.
2. District 3: Milford A. Hall, Senator from Apache County.
3. District 3: Walter Pulsipher, Senator from Apache County.
4. District 5: Ben Arnold, Senator from Pinal County.
5. District 6: Ray H. Thompson, Senator from Yuma County.

== Incumbents Defeated in General Elections ==
=== Democrats ===
1. District 7-C: Sol Ahee, Senator from Pima County.
2. District 8-L: George W. Peck, Senator from Maricopa County.

== Summary of Results by Arizona State Legislative District ==
=== Incumbents ===
County	Incumbent	Party
Apache	Walter Pulsipher	Dem
Apache	Milford Hall	Dem
Cochise	A. R. Spikes	Dem
Cochise	Dan S. Kitchel	Dem
Coconino	Fred F. Udine	Dem
Coconino	Thomas M. "Tommy" Knoles Jr.	Dem
Gila	Clarence L. Carpenter	Dem
Gila	William A. Sullivan	Dem
Graham	John Mickelson	Dem
Graham	Darvil B. McBride	Dem
Greenlee	M. L. (Marshall) Simms	Dem
Greenlee	John W. (Mac) McLaughlin	Dem
Maricopa	George W. Peck (Note: Senator B. C. Rhodes died on June 21, 1965, during the 3rd Special Session of the 27th Arizona State Legislature. The Maricopa County Board of Supervisors appointed Mr. George W. Peck, of Phoenix, to succeed Senator Rhodes.)	Dem
Maricopa	John Conlan	Rep
Mohave	Earle W. Cook	Dem
Mohave	Robert E. Morrow	Dem
Navajo	Glenn Blansett	Dem
Navajo	William "Bill" Huso	Dem
Pima	Edward I. Kennedy	Dem
Pima	Sol Ahee	Dem
Pinal	Ben Arnold	Dem
Pinal	Mrs. E. B. Thode	Dem
Santa Cruz	C. B. (Bert) Smith	Dem
Santa Cruz	Robert Hathaway	Dem
Yavapai	Boyd Tenney	Rep
Yavapai	David H. Palmer	Dem
Yuma	Harold C. Giss	Dem
Yuma	Ray H. Thompson	Dem

=== Elected Senators ===
District	Counties	Elected Senator	Party
1st	Mohave, Yavapai	Boyd Tenney (Note: Senator Tenney was an incumbent who had represented Yavapai County in the Senate before the election.)	Rep
2nd	Cochise, Graham, Santa Cruz	A. R. Spikes (Note: Senator Spikes was an incumbent who had represented Cochise County in the Senate before the election.)	Dem
2nd	Cochise, Graham, Santa Cruz	Dan S. Kitchel (Note: Senator Kitchel was an incumbent who had represented Cochise County in the Senate before the election.)	Dem
3rd	Apache, Greenlee, Navajo	Glenn Blansett (Note: Senator Blansett was an incumbent who had represented Navajo County in the Senate before the election.)	Dem
3rd	Apache, Greenlee, Navajo	William "Bill" Huso (Note: Senator Huso was an incumbent who had represented Navajo County in the Senate before the election.)	Dem
4th	Coconino	Thomas M. "Tommy" Knoles Jr. (Note: Senator Knoles was an incumbent who had represented Coconino County in the Senate before the election.)	Dem
5th	Gila, Pinal	Clarence L. Carpenter (Note: Senator Carpenter was an incumbent who had represented Gila County in the Senate before the election.)	Dem
5th	Gila, Pinal	E.B. "Blodie" Thode (Note: Senator Thode was an incumbent who had represented Pinal County in the Senate before the election.)	Dem
6th	Yuma	Harold C. Giss (Note: Senator Giss was an incumbent who had represented Yuma County in the Senate before the election.)	Dem
7-A	Pima (part)	Joe Castillo	Dem
7-B	Pima (part)	F. T. "Limie" Gibbings	Dem
7-C	Pima (part)	Ernest Garfield	Rep
7-D	Pima (part)	Douglas S. Holsclaw	Rep
7-E	Pima (part)	Thomas G. Beaham	Rep
7-F	Pima (part)	William C. Jacquin	Rep
8-A	Maricopa (part)	Marshall Humphrey	Rep
8-B	Maricopa (part)	William S. Porter	Rep
8-C	Maricopa (part)	John B. Conlan (Note: Senator Conlan was an incumbent who had represented Maricopa County in the Senate before the election.)	Rep
8-D	Maricopa (part)	David B. Kret	Rep
8-E	Maricopa (part)	Isabel Burgess	Rep
8-F	Maricopa (part)	Wing F. Ong	Dem
8-G	Maricopa (part)	Cloves Campbell	Dem
8-H	Maricopa (part)	Orme Lewis Jr.	Rep
8-I	Maricopa (part)	Chet Goldberg Jr.	Rep
8-J	Maricopa (part)	Bob Wilcox	Rep
8-K	Maricopa (part)	Ray A. Goetze	Rep
8-L	Maricopa (part)	Christopher T. Johnson	Rep
8-M	Maricopa (part)	William T. Crowley	Dem
8-N	Maricopa (part)	Bob Stump	Dem
8-O	Maricopa (part)	Dan Halacy	Rep

== Detailed Results ==
=== District 1 ===
Democratic primary results
Party	Candidate	Votes	%
Democratic	Milton O. "Mo" Lindner Jr.	2,995	48.15%
Democratic	Curtis Ritter	2,244	36.08%
Democratic	Don Carlos Crawford	981	15.77%
Total votes		6,220	100.00%

Republican primary results
Party	Candidate	Votes	%
Republican	Boyd Tenney (incumbent)	3,488	100.00%
Total votes		3,488	100.00%

General election results
Party	Candidate	Votes	%
Republican	Boyd Tenney (incumbent)	7,888	55.33%
Democratic	Milton O. "Mo" Lindner Jr.	6,368	44.67%
Total votes		14,256	100.00%

=== District 2 ===
- District 2 elected two Senators at the time.

Democratic primary results
Party	Candidate	Votes	%
Democratic	A. R. Spikes (incumbent)	6,769	35.05%
Democratic	Dan S. Kitchel (incumbent)	6,615	34.25%
Democratic	John Mickelson (incumbent)	5,931	30.71%
Total votes		19,315	100.00%

Republican primary results
Party	Candidate	Votes	%
Republican	W.L. Bristol	1,914	100.00%
Total votes		1,914	100.00%

General election results
Party	Candidate	Votes	%
Democratic	Dan S. Kitchel (incumbent)	11,904	38.87%
Democratic	A. R. Spikes (incumbent)	11,724	38.28%
Republican	W. L. Bristol	6,999	22.85%
Total votes		30,627	100.00%

=== District 3 ===
- District 3 elected two Senators at the time.

Democratic primary results
Party	Candidate	Votes	%
Democratic	William "Bill" Huso (incumbent)	4,759	32.47%
Democratic	Glenn Blansett (incumbent)	3,813	26.02%
Democratic	Milford A. Hall (incumbent)	3,457	23.59%
Democratic	Walter Pulsipher (incumbent)	2,627	17.92%
Total votes		14,656	100.00%

Republican primary results
Party	Candidate	Votes	%
Republican	Arthur C. Whiting	1,556	100.00%
Total votes		1,556	100.00%

General election results
Party	Candidate	Votes	%
Democratic	William "Bill" Huso (incumbent)	8,573	37.75%
Democratic	Glenn Blansett (incumbent)	7,403	32.60%
Republican	Arthur C. Whiting	6,731	29.64%
Total votes		22,707	100.00%

=== District 4 ===
Democratic primary results
Party	Candidate	Votes	%
Democratic	Thomas M. (Tommy) Knoles Jr. (incumbent)	2,531	100.00%
Total votes		2,531	100.00%

Republican primary results
Party	Candidate	Votes	%
Republican	Alfred E. Wohlschlegel	1,061	100.00%
Total votes		1,061	100.00%

General election results
Party	Candidate	Votes	%
Democratic	Thomas M. (Tommy) Knoles Jr. (incumbent)	4,605	61.65%
Republican	Alfred E. Wohlschlegel	2,865	38.35%
Total votes		7,470	100.00%

=== District 5 ===
- District 5 elected two Senators at the time.

Democratic primary results
Party	Candidate	Votes	%
Democratic	Clarence L. Carpenter (incumbent)	10,227	41.64%
Democratic	E.B. "Blodie" Thode (incumbent)	7,302	29.73%
Democratic	Ben Arnold (incumbent)	7,031	28.63%
Total votes		24,560	100.00%

General election results
Party	Candidate	Votes	%
Democratic	Clarence L. Carpenter (incumbent)	15,920	51.88%
Democratic	E.B. "Blodie" Thode (incumbent)	14,764	48.12%
Total votes		30,684	100.00%

=== District 6 ===
Democratic primary results
Party	Candidate	Votes	%
Democratic	Harold C. Giss (incumbent)	3,588	60.40%
Democratic	Ray H. Thompson (incumbent)	2,352	39.60%
Total votes		5,940	100.00%

General election results
Party	Candidate	Votes	%
Democratic	Harold C. Giss (incumbent)	7,790	100.00%
Total votes		7,790	100.00%

=== District 7-A ===
Democratic primary results
Party	Candidate	Votes	%
Democratic	Joe Castillo	2,922	47.21%
Democratic	Edward C. "Eddie" Jacobs	2,691	43.47%
Democratic	Ernie Soto Navarro	577	9.32%
Total votes		6,190	100.00%

General election results
Party	Candidate	Votes	%
Democratic	Joe Castillo	8,436	100.00%
Total votes		8,436	100.00%

=== District 7-B ===
Democratic primary results
Party	Candidate	Votes	%
Democratic	F. T. "Limie" Gibbings	1,320	37.00%
Democratic	Michael "Mike" Murray	1,301	36.46%
Democratic	Anthony B. Ching	947	26.54%
Total votes		3,568	100.00%

Republican primary results
Party	Candidate	Votes	%
Republican	Maxwell R. Palmer Jr.	948	100.00%
Total votes		948	100.00%

General election results
Party	Candidate	Votes	%
Democratic	F. T. "Limie" Gibbings	5,624	60.01%
Republican	Maxwell R. Palmer Jr.	3,747	39.99%
Total votes		9,371	100.00%

=== District 7-C ===
Democratic primary results
Party	Candidate	Votes	%
Democratic	Sol Ahee (incumbent)	3,345	100.00%
Total votes		3,345	100.00%

Republican primary results
Party	Candidate	Votes	%
Republican	Ernest Garfield	1,406	100.00%
Total votes		1,406	100.00%

General election results
Party	Candidate	Votes	%
Republican	Ernest Garfield	6,817	57.89%
Democratic	Sol Ahee (incumbent)	4,959	42.11%
Total votes		11,776	100.00%

=== District 7-D ===
Republican primary results
Party	Candidate	Votes	%
Republican	Douglas S. Holsclaw	2,542	71.55%
Republican	Jesse L. Hill	524	14.75%
Republican	Jane Reed Nusbaum	487	13.71%
Total votes		3,553	100.00%

General election results
Party	Candidate	Votes	%
Republican	Douglas S. Holsclaw	8,425	100.00%
Total votes		8,425	100.00%

=== District 7-E ===
Democratic primary results
Party	Candidate	Votes	%
Democratic	Frank Appleton	2,431	66.99%
Democratic	Gif Giffords	1,198	33.01%
Total votes		3,629	100.00%

Republican primary results
Party	Candidate	Votes	%
Republican	Thomas G. Beaham	2,378	100.00%
Total votes		2,378	100.00%

General election results
Party	Candidate	Votes	%
Republican	Thomas G. Beaham	6,924	52.87%
Democratic	Frank Appleton	6,172	47.13%
Total votes		13,096	100.00%

=== District 7-F ===
Democratic primary results
Party	Candidate	Votes	%
Democratic	Edward F. Hennessy	2,668	100.00%
Total votes		2,668	100.00%

Republican primary results
Party	Candidate	Votes	%
Republican	William C. Jacquin	2,632	63.90%
Republican	Norman C. Wade	1,487	36.10%
Total votes		4,119	100.00%

General election results
Party	Candidate	Votes	%
Republican	William C. Jacquin	8,803	64.15%
Democratic	Edward F. Hennessy	4,919	35.85%
Total votes		13,722	100.00%

=== District 8-A ===
Democratic primary results
Party	Candidate	Votes	%
Democratic	Ed Hamblen	2,544	63.86%
Democratic	Ray A. Rodriguez	1,440	36.14%
Total votes		3,984	100.00%

Republican primary results
Party	Candidate	Votes	%
Republican	Marshall Humphrey	2,198	100.00%
Total votes		2,198	100.00%

General election results
Party	Candidate	Votes	%
Republican	Marshall Humphrey	7,901	57.61%
Democratic	Ed Hamblen	5,813	42.39%
Total votes		13,714	100.00%

=== District 8-B ===
Republican primary results
Party	Candidate	Votes	%
Republican	William S. (Bill) Porter	3,081	100.00%
Total votes		3,081	100.00%

General election results
Party	Candidate	Votes	%
Republican	William S. (Bill) Porter	10,550	100.00%
Total votes		10,550	100.00%

=== District 8-C ===
Democratic primary results
Party	Candidate	Votes	%
Democratic	L. H. (Larry) Bell	1,474	100.00%
Total votes		1,474	100.00%

Republican primary results
Party	Candidate	Votes	%
Republican	John B. Conlan (incumbent)	3,132	56.16%
Republican	Ralph E. Staggs	2,445	43.84%
Total votes		5,577	100.00%

General election results
Party	Candidate	Votes	%
Republican	John B. Conlan (incumbent)	9,324	63.33%
Democratic	L. H. Bell	5,400	36.67%
Total votes		14,724	100.00%

=== District 8-D ===
Democratic primary results
Party	Candidate	Votes	%
Democratic	Kemper Goodwin	1,441	57.80%
Democratic	Paul D. Rademacher	1,052	42.20%
Total votes		2,493	100.00%

Republican primary results
Party	Candidate	Votes	%
Republican	David B. Kret	2,371	100.00%
Total votes		2,371	100.00%

General election results
Party	Candidate	Votes	%
Republican	David B. Kret	7,411	55.98%
Democratic	Kemper Goodwin	5,827	44.02%
Total votes		13,238	100.00%

=== District 8-E ===
Republican primary results
Party	Candidate	Votes	%
Republican	Isabel Burgess	3,420	73.01%
Republican	Steven "Steve" Toma	1,264	26.99%
Total votes		4,684	100.00%

General election results
Party	Candidate	Votes	%
Republican	Isabel Burgess	10,424	100.00%
Total votes		10,424	100.00%

=== District 8-F ===
Democratic primary results
Party	Candidate	Votes	%
Democratic	Wing F. Ong	2,232	56.00%
Democratic	Archie C. Ryan	1,754	44.00%
Total votes		3,986	100.00%

Republican primary results
Party	Candidate	Votes	%
Republican	Howard J. Hoelzer	1,595	100.00%
Total votes		1,595	100.00%

General election results
Party	Candidate	Votes	%
Democratic	Wing F. Ong	6,435	53.59%
Republican	J. Howard Hoelzer	5,572	46.41%
Total votes		12,007	100.00%

=== District 8-G ===
Democratic primary results
Party	Candidate	Votes	%
Democratic	Cloves Campbell	2,700	61.03%
Democratic	Leonard (Nano) Calderon Jr.	1,724	38.97%
Total votes		4,424	100.00%

General election results
Party	Candidate	Votes	%
Democratic	Cloves Campbell	7,862	100.00%
Total votes		7,862	100.00%

=== District 8-H ===
Democratic primary results
Party	Candidate	Votes	%
Democratic	Gerald A. Pollock	1,775	52.81%
Democratic	Perry Doyle	1,586	47.19%
Total votes		3,361	100.00%

Republican primary results
Party	Candidate	Votes	%
Republican	Orme Lewis Jr.	1,987	58.29%
Republican	Robert "Bob" Brewer	1,422	41.71%
Total votes		3,409	100.00%

General election results
Party	Candidate	Votes	%
Republican	Orme Lewis Jr.	7,787	59.73%
Democratic	Gerald A. Pollock	5,251	40.27%
Total votes		13,038	100.00%

=== District 8-I ===
Democratic primary results
Party	Candidate	Votes	%
Democratic	Rosendo "Rosie" Gutierrez	1,293	37.36%
Democratic	I. "Whitey" Brayer	1,175	33.95%
Democratic	Jack F. McCoy	526	15.20%
Democratic	Frances Bumsted Mitchell	467	13.49%
Total votes		3,461	100.00%

Republican primary results
Party	Candidate	Votes	%
Republican	Chet Goldberg Jr.	3,295	100.00%
Total votes		3,295	100.00%

General election results
Party	Candidate	Votes	%
Republican	Chet Goldberg Jr.	8,326	57.12%
Democratic	Rosendo Gutierrez	6,250	42.88%
Total votes		14,576	100.00%

=== District 8-J ===
Democratic primary results
Party	Candidate	Votes	%
Democratic	Bruce Wallace	1,419	46.42%
Democratic	Albert B. (Al) Spector	1,130	36.96%
Democratic	Oldrich "Al" Drake	508	16.62%
Total votes		3,057	100.00%

Republican primary results
Party	Candidate	Votes	%
Republican	Bob Wilcox	2,780	57.68%
Republican	Priscilla H. Hays	2,040	42.32%
Total votes		4,820	100.00%

General election results
Party	Candidate	Votes	%
Republican	Bob Wilcox	9,439	64.47%
Democratic	Bruce Wallace	5,201	35.53%
Total votes		14,640	100.00%

=== District 8-K ===
Republican primary results
Party	Candidate	Votes	%
Republican	Ray A. Goetze	2,930	68.51%
Republican	Martin Egen	1,347	31.49%
Total votes		4,277	100.00%

General election results
Party	Candidate	Votes	%
Republican	Ray A. Goetze	9,963	100.00%
Total votes		9,963	100.00%

=== District 8-L ===
Democratic primary results
Party	Candidate	Votes	%
Democratic	George W. Peck (incumbent)	2,051	52.89%
Democratic	David C. Cox	1,268	32.70%
Democratic	Mike Parker	559	14.41%
Total votes		3,878	100.00%

Republican primary results
Party	Candidate	Votes	%
Republican	Christopher T. "Chris" Johnson	2,497	100.00%
Total votes		2,497	100.00%

General election results
Party	Candidate	Votes	%
Republican	Christopher T. Johnson	8,436	57.47%
Democratic	George W. Peck (incumbent)	6,243	42.53%
Total votes		14,679	100.00%

=== District 8-M ===
Democratic primary results
Party	Candidate	Votes	%
Democratic	William T. "Bill" Crowley	2,034	55.05%
Democratic	Luther D. Meadows	839	22.71%
Democratic	Dr. A. E. Zachow	709	19.19%
Democratic	Jim Young	113	3.06%
Total votes		3,695	100.00%

Republican primary results
Party	Candidate	Votes	%
Republican	George Klock	1,146	52.52%
Republican	James D. Gipson Jr.	1,036	47.48%
Total votes		2,182	100.00%

General election results
Party	Candidate	Votes	%
Democratic	William T. Crowley	6,548	52.48%
Republican	George Klock	5,929	47.52%
Total votes		12,477	100.00%

=== District 8-N ===
Democratic primary results
Party	Candidate	Votes	%
Democratic	Bob Stump	2,447	45.46%
Democratic	E.G. "Earl" Rhodes	1,498	27.83%
Democratic	J. B. Sutton	1,438	26.71%
Total votes		5,383	100.00%

Republican primary results
Party	Candidate	Votes	%
Republican	A. J. LaSalvia	993	100.00%
Total votes		993	100.00%

General election results
Party	Candidate	Votes	%
Democratic	Bob Stump	7,706	69.85%
Republican	A. J. LaSalvia	3,327	30.15%
Total votes		11,033	100.00%

=== District 8-O ===
Democratic primary results
Party	Candidate	Votes	%
Democratic	M. J. "Buck" Brown	2,028	45.64%
Democratic	Dr. E. B. Clemit	1,554	34.98%
Democratic	Justine Spitalny	861	19.38%
Total votes		4,443	100.00%

Republican primary results
Party	Candidate	Votes	%
Republican	Dan Halacy	2,068	100.00%
Total votes		2,068	100.00%

General election results
Party	Candidate	Votes	%
Republican	Dan Halacy	6,193	48.19%
Democratic	M. J. Brown	4,838	37.65%
Independent	T. C. Rhodes	1,819	14.16%
Total votes		12,850	100.00%
