= Janeen Connolly =

American politician

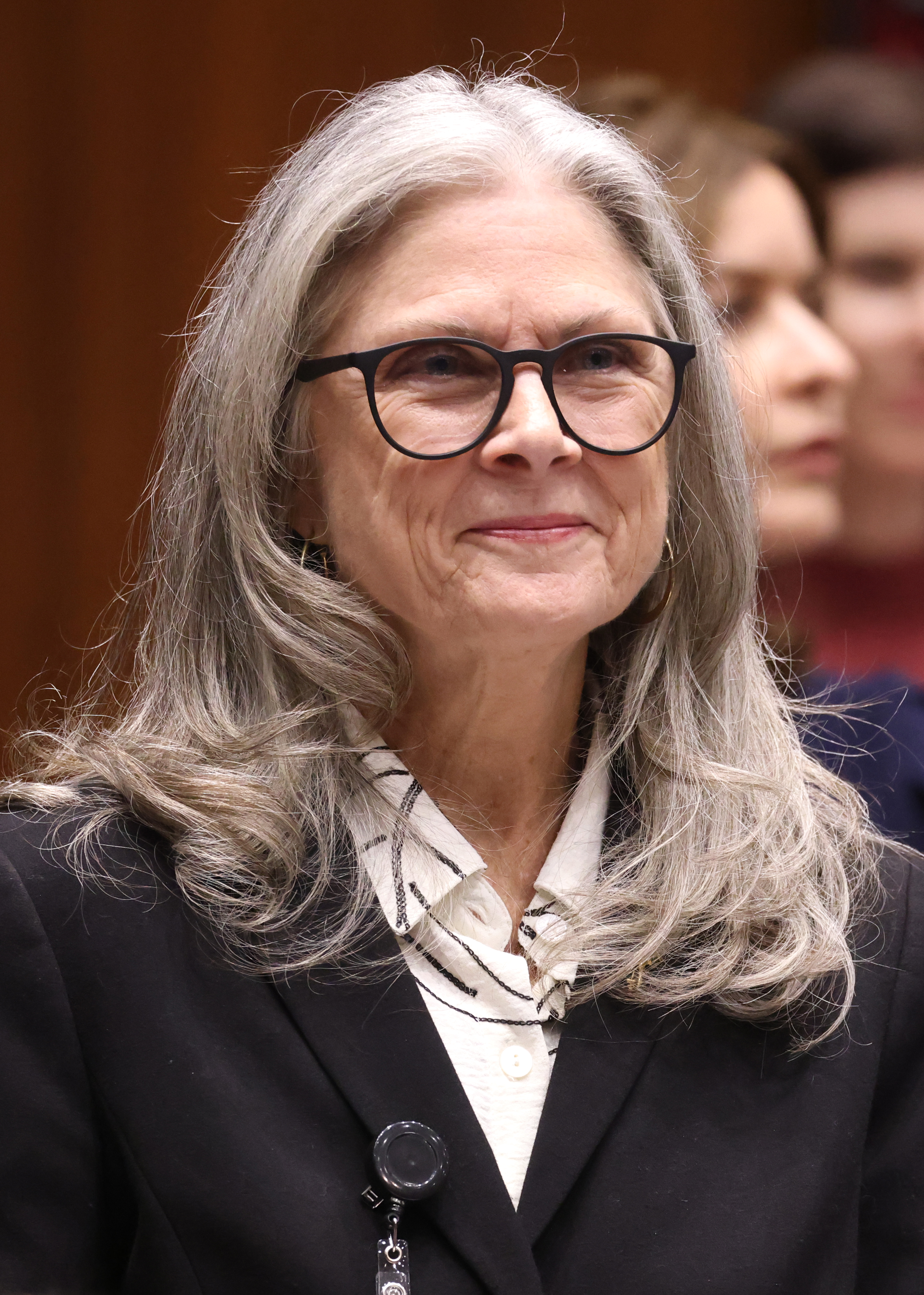
- Connolly in 2025

Member of the Arizona House of Representatives from the 8th district
- Incumbent
- Assumed office January 13, 2025 Serving with Brian Garcia
- Preceded by: Melody Hernandez

Personal details
- Party: Democratic
- Education: Mesa Community College; Arizona State University

Janeen Connolly is an American politician serving as a member of the Arizona House of Representatives from the 8th legislative district since 2025. She previously worked for the Salt River Project in community relations, grassroots advocacy, and public involvement for 27 years.

== Education ==
Connolly graduated from Mesa Community College. She earned a B.S and a M.A. in advocacy communication from Arizona State University.

== Career ==
On February 19, 1996, Connolly started at the Salt River Project (SRP) as a community relations representative. Connolly advanced to a leadership position in public involvement and eventually became the senior government relations representative for SRP, where she managed relationships with key stakeholders throughout rural Arizona with a unique focus on Pinal County, Arizona. Connolly was registered as an authorized lobbyist with SRP from 2007 to 2021. Her role as a government relations representative included representing SRP in discussions concerning community needs and public involvement.

At SRP, Connolly was engaged with economic development initiatives in Pinal County and collaborated with chambers of commerce and other regional entities. She chaired the East Valley Partnership's Superstition Vistas Steering Committee for over five years, where she led discussions on balanced land-use planning for the region. Connolly left SRP on May 26, 2021.

Connolly ran in the 2024 Arizona House of Representatives election a seat in the 8th legislative district. She ran as a Democrat against other candidates on the party's slate for the district, including Juan Mendez, Brian Garcia and senate candidate Lauren Kuby. During the campaign, her connection to SRP became a topic of scrutiny; Kuby, Democratic senate candidate, shared documentation from the Arizona Secretary of State showing Connolly's lobbyist registration, bringing attention to her ties to utility companies such as SRP, Arizona Public Service, and Southwest Gas. Connolly responded by addressing her SRP role as primarily focused on local government relations and community advocacy rather than direct legislative lobbying. Connolly's campaign platform prioritized issues relevant to the district, including K–12 education reform, affordable housing, climate change, and water policy. In November 2024, Connolly and Garcia won the general election, with Connolly receiving the most votes.
