= Brian Garcia (politician) =

American politician

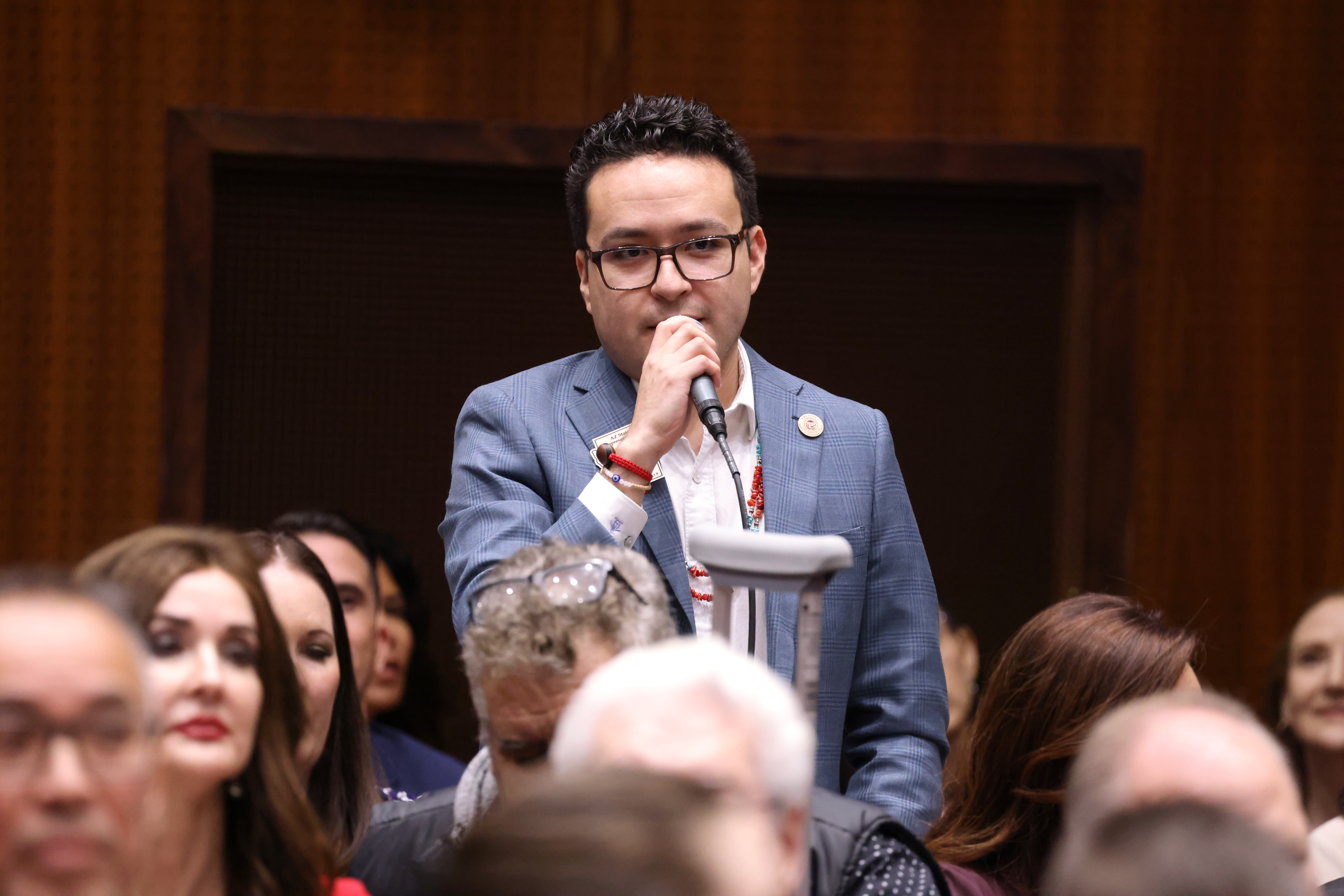
- Garcia in 2025

Member of the Arizona House of Representatives from the 8th district
- Incumbent
- Assumed office January 13, 2025 Serving with Janeen Connolly
- Preceded by: Deborah Nardozzi

Personal details
- Party: Democratic
- Education: Arizona State University (BA, MLS, JD)

Brian Garcia is an American politician. He serves as a Democratic member for the 8th district of the Arizona House of Representatives.

== Early life and education ==
Garcia was born to Ismael and Catalina Garcia, and grew up in Tempe, Ahwatukee, and Guadalupe. He graduated from McClintock High School in 2011, then earned a Bachelor of Arts in global studies from Arizona State University in 2015, as well as a Master of Legal Studies in 2017 and a Juris Doctor from the Sandra Day O'Connor College of Law.

== Career ==
Garcia worked as an outreach coordinator for Kyrsten Sinema during her tenure in the U.S. House of Representatives and served on the Tempe Union High School District. A member of the Pascua Yaqui Tribe, he worked as a law clerk for the tribe.

He volunteered for Arizona Native Votes during the 2020 presidential election, where he witnessed voter intimidation when an impromptu rally of Trump supporters deterred voters, mostly Native Americans, from entering a polling location in Guadalupe.

=== Arizona House of Representatives ===
Garcia co-sponsored House Bill 2281, which would establish an alert system managed by the Arizona Department of Public Safety to be used when an Indigenous person has gone missing under unexplained or suspicious circumstances. It passed the legislature with amendments in May 2025.

== Personal life ==
Garcia served as a legal guardian for his younger brother, Aaron. He is an enrolled member of the Pascua Yaqui Tribe.
