= Isabel Burgess =

American politician (1912–1999)

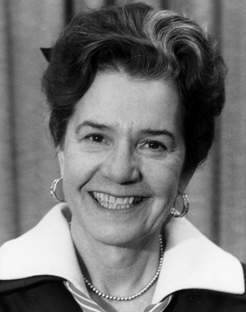

Member of the National Transportation Safety Board
- In office 1969–1976

Member of the Arizona Senate
- In office 1967–1969
- Succeeded by: Sandra Day O'Connor

Member of the Arizona House of Representatives
- In office 1953–1967

Personal details
- Born: April 3, 1912 Cleveland, Ohio, U.S.
- Died: September 17, 1999 (aged 87) Scottsdale, Arizona, U.S.
- Spouse: Richard Burgess (m. 1939; div. 1967)
- Children: Richard B. Burgess, Thomas H. Burgess and Susan Burgess Cordsen

Isabel Andrews Burgess (née Andrews; April 3, 1912 – September 17, 1999) was an American politician and public official from Phoenix, Arizona, who is known for her contributions to transportation safety at the federal level, including her tenure on the National Transportation Safety Board.

== Early life and education ==
Burgess was born in Cleveland, Ohio, on April 3, 1912, to William Andrews and Alice Ball Andrews (the daughter of Webb C. Ball). Burgess spent one year of post-secondary matriculation at Mills College and another at Case Western Reserve University, where she majored in art history. During this time she was very active in the League of Women Voters, where she was elected president of her chapter. Burgess' passion for the arts and civil service led her to take up several prominent roles in the Phoenix community after her relocation to Phoenix, Arizona in the late 1940s. There, she again became active in the LWV, eventually becoming the Phoenix chapter secretary. Burgess was elected to the Heard Museum's secretary to the board of directors, a position that eventually led to her founding of the Phoenix Art Council, which in turn granted her membership in the Phoenix Art Museum.

== Personal life ==
In 1939, Burgess married Richard Burgess, who at the time was a certified public accountant and held a managing partnership at the Alexander Grant Company. The couple had three children, Richard B. Burgess, Thomas H. Burgess and Susan Burgess Cordsen, before their divorce in 1967. Richard Burgess died in 1977.

== Political career ==
As Burgess' local recognition came to a head with her foundation of the Phoenix Art Council, prominent Phoenix republicans began to encourage her to become involved in the Arizona Republican Party, which led to her foundation of a Republican Party Group in her district. Burgess was encouraged to run for the Arizona Legislature in 1952.

=== Arizona State Legislature (1953–1969) ===
Burgess served five consecutive terms from 1953 to 1967 in the Arizona House of Representatives representing Maricopa District 8E. During her tenure in the House, she served as Chair of the Highways and Transportation Committee and as Chair of the Joint Senate and House Interim Transportation Committee. She was also a member of the Board of Governors for the Council of State Governments, as well as the Chair of the National Legislative Transportation Committee.

She then ran for and won a seat in the Arizona State Senate from 1967, becoming the first Republican woman to do so. There, she became the Chair of the Arizona State Senate Highway and Transportation Committee. Burgess would only serve a fraction of one term in the Arizona Senate, however, as she was nominated by President Richard Nixon in 1969 to the National Transportation Safety Board after a recommendation from Senator Barry Goldwater and Representative John Rhodes. At the time, her leadership as the Chair of the National Legislative Transportation Committee and being a woman made her an ideal candidate for nomination. Future Supreme Court Justice Sandra Day O'Connor was appointed to fill her vacancy in the Senate on October 30 of the same year.

=== National Transportation Safety Board (1969–1976) ===
A hearing on Burgess' nomination was heard by the Senate Committee on Commerce on October 3, 1969, with her approval won shortly thereafter. During her tenure, Burgess oversaw several crucial events in transportation safety and evolution, including the ALM Flight 980 crash in 1970. Overall, Burgess oversaw 17 major NTSB investigations, as well as 12 official hearings. Burgess was noted for her frequent domestic and international speeches advocating for better safety in the transportation industry, both in the private and government sectors.

Burgess focused most of her time on the Board towards cabin safety on aircraft, better galley and gallery security, jumpseat safety, and an unprecedented platform advocating for better evacuation slides and emergency interior lighting. In 1971, she was named "Outstanding Woman in the Field of Life Support" by the Survival and Flight Equipment Association. She was also named an honorary member of the Flight Attendants Association in 1972 for her work towards greater transportation safety. Burgess served on the NTSB until 1976.

== Later life and death ==
After serving on the NTSB, Burgess briefly served in the Department of the Interior as special assistant to the assistant secretary of energy and minerals starting in 1976, before she retired permanently from civil service in January 1977.

In 1991, Burgess moved back to Arizona from her residence in Washington, D.C. Burgess died on September 17, 1999, in Scottsdale, Arizona, from breast cancer, and is buried in Cleveland, Ohio.
