= Melody Hernandez (politician) =

American politician

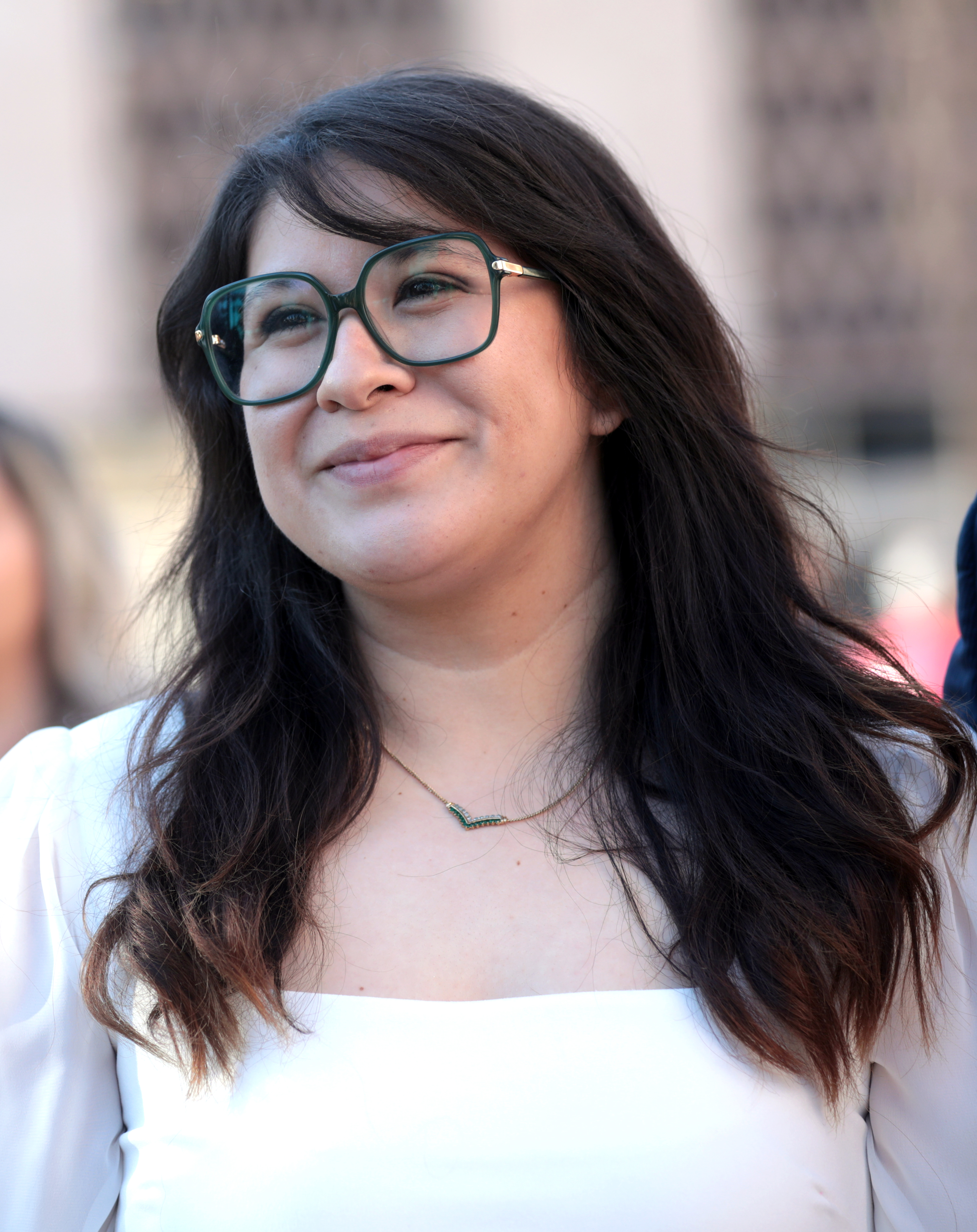
- Hernandez in 2023

Member of the Arizona House of Representatives
- In office January 11, 2021 – January 13, 2025
- Preceded by: Isela Blanc
- Succeeded by: Janeen Connolly
- Constituency: 26th district (2021–2023); 8th district (2023–2025)

Personal details
- Born: Arizona, U.S.
- Party: Democratic
- Occupation: Paramedic

Melody Hernandez is an American politician who served as a member of the Arizona House of Representatives from the 8th district. Elected in 2020, she assumed office on January 11, 2021, and left office in 2025. In 2024, she ran for the Arizona State Senate but withdrew from the primary ballot after her nominating signatures were challenges for not being valid.

== Background ==
Hernandez was born and raised in the East Valley region of Arizona. She works as a paramedic in Tempe, Arizona. She was also the communications director for GlobeMed, a student group at Arizona State University.
