= Arizona's 8th legislative district =

American legislative district

- Map of District 8: Approved January 21, 2022
- Senator: Lauren Kuby (D)
- House members: Janeen Connolly (D); Brian Garcia (D)
- Registration: 33.99% Democratic; 26.27% Republican; 37.49% Other
- Demographics: 53% White; 7% Black/African American; 5% Native American; 8% Asian; 25% Hispanic
- Population: 244,166
- Voting-age population: 204,640
- Registered voters: 117,848

Arizona's 8th legislative district is one of 30 in the state, consisting of a section of Maricopa County. As of 2023, there are 57 precincts in the district, all in Maricopa, with a total registered voter population of 117,848. The district has an overall population of 244,166.

Following the 2020 United States redistricting cycle, the Arizona Independent Redistricting Commission (AIRC) redrew legislative district boundaries in Arizona. According to the AIRC, the district is outside of competitive range and considered leaning Democratic.

== Political representation ==
The district is represented in the 56th Arizona State Legislature, which convenes from January 1, 2023, to December 31, 2024, by Juan Mendez (D-Tempe) in the Arizona Senate and by Melody Hernandez (D-Tempe) and Deborah Nardozzi (D-Scottsdale) in the Arizona House of Representatives.

Jevin Hodge was appointed in January 2024 to succeed Representative Athena Salman, who resigned at the end of 2023. However, Representative Hodge subsequently resigned in March 2024 from the seat as well. Nardozzi was appointed to succeed Hodge in April 2024.

| Name | Image | Residence | Office | Party |
|---|---|---|---|---|
| Lauren Kuby | | Tempe | State senator | Democrat |
| Janeen Connolly | | Tempe | State representative | Democrat |
| Brian Garcia | | Tempe | State representative | Democrat |

== Election results ==
The 2022 elections were the first in the newly drawn district.

=== Arizona Senate ===
2022 Arizona's 8th Senate district election
| Party | Candidate | Votes | % |
|---|---|---|---|
| Democratic | Juan Mendez (incumbent) | 42,669 | 62.72 |
| Republican | Roxana Holzapfel | 25,366 | 37.28 |
| Total votes | | 68,035 | 100 |
| Democratic hold | | | |

=== Arizona House of Representatives ===
2022 Arizona House of Representatives election, 8th district
| Party | Candidate | Votes | % |
|---|---|---|---|
| Democratic | Melody Hernandez (Incumbent) | 40,378 | 31.71 |
| Democratic | Athena Salman (Incumbent) | 39,386 | 30.93 |
| Republican | Caden Darrow | 23,848 | 18.73 |
| Republican | Bill Loughrige | 23,725 | 18.63 |
| Total votes | | 127,337 | 100.00 |
| Democratic hold | | | |
| Democratic hold | | | |

== See also ==
- List of Arizona legislative districts
- Arizona State Legislature
