= 1976 Arizona Senate election =

- November 2, 1976

All 30 seats of the Arizona Senate 16 seats needed for a majority
	Majority party	Minority party
Party	Democratic	Republican
Seats before	18	12
Seats after	16	14
Seat change	▼2	▲2
Senate President before election
Bob Stump
Democratic
Elected Senate President
Ed C. Sawyer
Democratic

The 1976 Arizona Senate election was held on November 2, 1976. Voters elected members of the Arizona Senate in all 30 of the state's legislative districts to serve a two-year term. Primary elections were held on September 7, 1976.

Prior to the elections, the Democrats held a majority of 18 seats over the Republicans' 12 seats.

Following the election, Democrats maintained control of the chamber with 16 Democrats to 14 Republicans, a net gain of two seats for Republicans.

The newly elected senators served in the 33rd Arizona State Legislature.

== Summary of Results by Arizona State Legislative District ==
Legislative District	Incumbent	Party	Elected Senator	Outcome
1st	Boyd Tenney	Rep	Boyd Tenney	Rep Hold
2nd	Tony Gabaldon	Dem	Lewis J. McDonald	Dem Hold
3rd	Arthur J. Hubbard Sr.	Dem	Arthur J. Hubbard Sr.	Dem Hold
4th	A.V. "Bill" Hardt	Dem	A.V. "Bill" Hardt	Dem Hold
5th	Jones Osborn	Dem	Jones Osborn	Dem Hold
6th	Bob Stump	Dem	Polly Getzwiller	Dem Hold
7th	William L. Swink	Dem	William L. Swink	Dem Hold
8th	Ed Sawyer	Dem	Ed Sawyer	Dem Hold
9th	Steve Davis	Rep	John J. Hutton	Dem Gain
10th	Sam Lena	Dem	Tom Moore	Dem Hold
11th	Frank J. Felix	Dem	Frank J. Felix	Dem Hold
12th	Sue Dye	Dem	Sue Dye	Dem Hold
13th	Morris Farr	Dem	Morris Farr	Dem Hold
14th	Lucy Davidson	Dem	Jim Kolbe	Rep Gain
15th	S.H. "Hal" Runyan	Rep	S.H. "Hal" Runyan	Rep Hold
16th	Marcia Weeks	Dem	Marcia Weeks	Dem Hold
17th	Fred Koory Jr.	Rep	Anne Lindeman	Rep Hold
18th	Leo Corbet	Rep	Leo Corbet	Rep Hold
19th	Madelene Van Arsdell	Dem	Ray Rottas	Rep Gain
20th	Bill McCune	Rep	Lela Alston	Dem Gain
21st	James P. Walsh	Dem	Timothy D. Hayes	Rep Gain
22nd	Manuel "Lito" Peña	Dem	Manuel "Lito" Peña	Dem Hold
23rd	Alfredo Gutierrez	Dem	Alfredo Gutierrez	Dem Hold
24th	John C. Pritzlaff Jr.	Rep	John C. Pritzlaff Jr.	Rep Hold
25th	Betty Morrison	Dem	Trudy Camping	Rep Gain
26th	John Roeder	Rep	Rod J. McMullin	Rep Hold
27th	James A. (Jim) Mack	Rep	James A. (Jim) Mack	Rep Hold
28th	Bob Hungerford	Rep	Robert B. Usdane	Rep Hold
29th	Jack J. Taylor	Rep	Jack J. Taylor	Rep Hold
30th	Stan Turley	Rep	Stan Turley	Rep Hold

== Detailed Results ==
=== District 1 ===
Republican primary results
Party	Candidate	Votes	%
Republican	Boyd Tenney (incumbent)	9,904	100.00%
Total votes		9,904	100.00%

Libertarian Primary Results
Party	Candidate	Votes	%
Libertarian	Ronald D. Klotz (Note: Withdrew from the general election.)	-	100.00%
Total votes		-	100.00%

General election results
Party	Candidate	Votes	%
Republican	Boyd Tenney (incumbent)	23,929	99.82%
Independent	M. F. Spawn (Note: Write-in candidate with no party designated.)	43	0.18%
Total votes		23,972	100.00%
Republican hold			

=== District 2 ===
Democratic primary results
Party	Candidate	Votes	%
Democratic	Dr. Lewis J. McDonald	4,268	52.18%
Democratic	Annice Husband	3,912	47.82%
Total votes		8,180	100.00%

Republican primary results
Party	Candidate	Votes	%
Republican	Albert Jarrell	3,818	100.00%
Total votes		3,818	100.00%

General election results
Party	Candidate	Votes	%
Democratic	Dr. Lewis J. McDonald	14,345	67.09%
Republican	Albert Jarrell	7,036	32.91%
Total votes		21,381	100.00%
Democratic hold			

=== District 3 ===
Democratic primary results
Party	Candidate	Votes	%
Democratic	Arthur J. Hubbard, Sr. (incumbent)	3,985	50.74%
Democratic	Lloyd L. House, Ph.D.	3,868	49.26%
Total votes		7,853	100.00%

General election results
Party	Candidate	Votes	%
Democratic	Arthur J. Hubbard, Sr. (incumbent)	15,584	100.00%
Total votes		15,584	100.00%
Democratic hold			

=== District 4 ===
Democratic primary results
Party	Candidate	Votes	%
Democratic	A.V. "Bill" Hardt (incumbent)	12,713	100.00%
Total votes		12,713	100.00%

General election results
Party	Candidate	Votes	%
Democratic	A.V. "Bill" Hardt (incumbent)	17,942	100.00%
Total votes		17,942	100.00%
Democratic hold			

=== District 5 ===
Democratic primary results
Party	Candidate	Votes	%
Democratic	Jones Osborn (incumbent)	5,095	68.27%
Democratic	Bob (Red) Phillips	2,368	31.73%
Total votes		7,463	100.00%

General election results
Party	Candidate	Votes	%
Democratic	Jones Osborn (incumbent)	13,353	100.00%
Total votes		13,353	100.00%
Democratic hold			

=== District 6 ===
Democratic primary results
Party	Candidate	Votes	%
Democratic	Polly Getzwiller	3,735	53.76%
Democratic	Ana Maria Chavez	3,213	46.24%
Total votes		6,948	100.00%

General election results
Party	Candidate	Votes	%
Democratic	Polly Getzwiller	12,250	100.00%
Total votes		12,250	100.00%
Democratic hold			

=== District 7 ===
Democratic primary results
Party	Candidate	Votes	%
Democratic	William L. Swink (incumbent)	4,893	46.92%
Democratic	Marie E. Dore	3,616	34.68%
Democratic	Roy Nuch	1,919	18.40%
Total votes		10,428	100.00%

General election results
Party	Candidate	Votes	%
Democratic	William L. Swink (incumbent)	13,930	100.00%
Total votes		13,930	100.00%
Democratic hold			

=== District 8 ===
Democratic primary results
Party	Candidate	Votes	%
Democratic	Ed C. Sawyer (incumbent)	10,826	100.00%
Total votes		10,826	100.00%

General election results
Party	Candidate	Votes	%
Democratic	Ed C. Sawyer (incumbent)	16,771	100.00%
Total votes		16,771	100.00%
Democratic hold			

=== District 9 ===
Democratic primary results
Party	Candidate	Votes	%
Democratic	John J. Hutton	6,061	100.00%
Total votes		6,061	100.00%

Republican primary results
Party	Candidate	Votes	%
Republican	Hercules V. Galie	4,236	100.00%
Total votes		4,236	100.00%

General election results
Party	Candidate	Votes	%
Democratic	John J. Hutton	8,767	39.00%
Independent	Stephen A. "Steve" Davis (incumbent) (Note: Senator Davis was elected as a Republican in 1974, but ran for re-election as an Independent in 1976.)	7,288	32.42%
Republican	Hercules V. Galie	6,424	28.58%
Total votes		22,479	100.00%
Democratic gain from Republican			

=== District 10 ===
Democratic primary results
Party	Candidate	Votes	%
Democratic	Tom Moore	1,734	27.04%
Democratic	Luis Armando Gonzales	1,698	26.48%
Democratic	Joe Skinner	1,639	25.56%
Democratic	Cora B. Equibel	1,004	15.66%
Democratic	Lino F. Aragon	337	5.26%
Total votes		6,412	100.00%

Republican primary results
Party	Candidate	Votes	%
Republican	John Seabrook Moore	1,016	100.00%
Total votes		1,016	100.00%

General election results
Party	Candidate	Votes	%
Democratic	Tom Moore	9,806	79.25%
Republican	John Seabrook Moore	2,567	20.75%
Total votes		12,373	100.00%
Democratic hold			

=== District 11 ===
Democratic primary results
Party	Candidate	Votes	%
Democratic	Frank J. Felix (incumbent)	6,573	100.00%
Total votes		6,573	100.00%

General election results
Party	Candidate	Votes	%
Democratic	Frank J. Felix (incumbent)	13,927	100.00%
Total votes		13,927	100.00%
Democratic hold			

=== District 12 ===
Democratic primary results
Party	Candidate	Votes	%
Democratic	Sue Dye (incumbent)	7,679	100.00%
Total votes		7,679	100.00%

Republican primary results
Party	Candidate	Votes	%
Republican	Pete Hershberger	6,042	100.00%
Total votes		6,042	100.00%

General election results
Party	Candidate	Votes	%
Democratic	Sue Dye (incumbent)	14,995	50.94%
Republican	Pete Hershberger	14,439	49.06%
Total votes		29,434	100.00%
Democratic hold			

=== District 13 ===
Democratic primary results
Party	Candidate	Votes	%
Democratic	Morris Farr (incumbent)	7,550	100.00%
Total votes		7,550	100.00%

Republican primary results
Party	Candidate	Votes	%
Republican	H. Thomas (Tom) Kincaid	3,770	54.76%
Republican	James W. "Jim" Cocke	3,115	45.24%
Total votes		6,885	100.00%

General election results
Party	Candidate	Votes	%
Democratic	Morris Farr (incumbent)	13,925	51.20%
Republican	H. Thomas (Tom) Kincaid	13,271	48.80%
Total votes		27,196	100.00%
Democratic hold			

=== District 14 ===
Democratic primary results
Party	Candidate	Votes	%
Democratic	Lucy Davidson (incumbent)	6,556	66.52%
Democratic	Glynn Burkhardt	3,299	33.48%
Total votes		9,855	100.00%

Republican primary results
Party	Candidate	Votes	%
Republican	Jim Kolbe	8,101	100.00%
Total votes		8,101	100.00%

General election results
Party	Candidate	Votes	%
Republican	Jim Kolbe	19,934	56.61%
Democratic	Lucy Davidson (incumbent)	15,278	43.39%
Total votes		35,212	100.00%
Republican gain from Democratic			

=== District 15 ===
Republican primary results
Party	Candidate	Votes	%
Republican	S. H. "Hal" Runyan (incumbent)	7,214	100.00%
Total votes		7,214	100.00%

General election results
Party	Candidate	Votes	%
Republican	S. H. "Hal" Runyan (incumbent)	17,158	100.00%
Total votes		17,158	100.00%
Republican hold			

=== District 16 ===
Democratic primary results
Party	Candidate	Votes	%
Democratic	Marcia Weeks (incumbent)	7,216	100.00%
Total votes		7,216	100.00%

Republican primary results
Party	Candidate	Votes	%
Republican	Nonavie Dyer	7,916	100.00%
Total votes		7,916	100.00%

General election results
Party	Candidate	Votes	%
Democratic	Marcia Weeks (incumbent)	18,023	54.06%
Republican	Nonavie Dyer	15,317	45.94%
Total votes		33,340	100.00%
Democratic hold			

=== District 17 ===
Democratic primary results
Party	Candidate	Votes	%
Democratic	Joe D. Alvarado	5,556	100.00%
Total votes		5,556	100.00%

Republican primary results
Party	Candidate	Votes	%
Republican	Anne Lindeman	10,965	100.00%
Total votes		10,965	100.00%

General election results
Party	Candidate	Votes	%
Republican	Anne Lindeman	23,000	73.66%
Democratic	Joe D. Alvarado	8,223	26.34%
Total votes		31,223	100.00%
Republican hold			

=== District 18 ===
Democratic primary results
Party	Candidate	Votes	%
Democratic	Phyllis Rowe	4,896	99.94%
Democratic	Hanna G. "Happy" Shaw (Note: Write-in candidate.)	3	0.06%
Total votes		4,899	100.00%

Republican primary results
Party	Candidate	Votes	%
Republican	Leo Corbet (incumbent)	7,794	100.00%
Total votes		7,794	100.00%

General election results
Party	Candidate	Votes	%
Republican	Leo Corbet (incumbent)	13,968	58.85%
Democratic	Phyllis Rowe	9,763	41.14%
Democratic	Hanna G. "Happy" Shaw	2	0.01%
Total votes		23,733	100.00%
Republican hold			

=== District 19 ===
Democratic primary results
Party	Candidate	Votes	%
Democratic	Madelene Van Arsdell (incumbent)	4,952	100.00%
Total votes		4,952	100.00%

Republican primary results
Party	Candidate	Votes	%
Republican	Ray Rottas	7,074	100.00%
Total votes		7,074	100.00%

General election results
Party	Candidate	Votes	%
Republican	Ray Rottas	12,430	51.03%
Democratic	Madelene Van Arsdell (incumbent)	11,929	48.97%
Total votes		24,359	100.00%
Republican gain from Democratic			

=== District 20 ===
Democratic primary results
Party	Candidate	Votes	%
Democratic	Lela Alston	4,640	100.00%
Total votes		4,640	100.00%

Republican primary results
Party	Candidate	Votes	%
Republican	Howard Adams	4,454	100.00%
Total votes		4,454	100.00%

General election results
Party	Candidate	Votes	%
Democratic	Lela Alston	10,085	52.97%
Republican	Howard Adams	8,954	47.03%
Total votes		19,039	100.00%
Democratic gain from Republican			

=== District 21 ===
Democratic primary results
Party	Candidate	Votes	%
Democratic	James P. Walsh (incumbent)	4,888	100.00%
Total votes		4,888	100.00%

Republican primary results
Party	Candidate	Votes	%
Republican	Tim Hayes	5,160	100.00%
Total votes		5,160	100.00%

General election results
Party	Candidate	Votes	%
Republican	Tim Hayes	9,636	51.98%
Democratic	James P. Walsh (incumbent)	8,901	48.02%
Total votes		18,537	100.00%
Republican gain from Democratic			

=== District 22 ===
Democratic primary results
Party	Candidate	Votes	%
Democratic	Manuel "Lito" Peña (incumbent)	4,528	100.00%
Total votes		4,528	100.00%

Republican primary results
Party	Candidate	Votes	%
Republican	James L. "Jim" Cassavant	1,497	100.00%
Total votes		1,497	100.00%

General election results
Party	Candidate	Votes	%
Democratic	Manuel "Lito" Pena (incumbent)	7,611	64.77%
Republican	James L. "Jim" Cassavant	4,139	35.23%
Total votes		11,750	100.00%
Democratic hold			

=== District 23 ===
Democratic primary results
Party	Candidate	Votes	%
Democratic	Alfredo Gutierrez (incumbent)	2,176	45.77%
Democratic	Cloves C. Campbell	1,697	35.70%
Democratic	Ben R. Miranda	626	13.17%
Democratic	Loraine Ellis	255	5.36%
Total votes		4,754	100.00%

Republican primary results
Party	Candidate	Votes	%
Republican	Wanda M. Williams	461	100.00%
Total votes		461	100.00%

General election results
Party	Candidate	Votes	%
Democratic	Alfredo Gutierrez (incumbent)	6,409	78.49%
Republican	Wanda M. Williams	1,306	16.00%
Independent	William (Bill) S. Mershon	450	5.51%
Total votes		8,165	100.00%
Democratic hold			

=== District 24 ===
Democratic primary results
Party	Candidate	Votes	%
Democratic	James W. McCullough (Note: Write-in candidate; did not qualify for general election ballot.)	18	100.00%
Total votes		18	100.00%

Republican primary results
Party	Candidate	Votes	%
Republican	John C. Pritzlaff, Jr. (incumbent)	12,221	81.16%
Republican	Maurice Deise	2,836	18.84%
Total votes		15,057	100.00%

General election results
Party	Candidate	Votes	%
Republican	John C. Pritzlaff, Jr. (incumbent)	35,586	100.00%
Total votes		35,586	100.00%
Republican hold			

=== District 25 ===
Democratic primary results
Party	Candidate	Votes	%
Democratic	Betty Morrison (incumbent)	5,060	100.00%
Total votes		5,060	100.00%

Republican primary results
Party	Candidate	Votes	%
Republican	Trudy Camping	4,656	100.00%
Total votes		4,656	100.00%

General election results
Party	Candidate	Votes	%
Republican	Trudy Camping	9,343	50.31%
Democratic	Betty Morrison (incumbent)	8,543	46.00%
Independent	Ewell M. Collins	686	3.69%
Total votes		18,572	100.00%
Republican gain from Democratic			

=== District 26 ===
Democratic primary results
Party	Candidate	Votes	%
Democratic	Edith "Jo" Laetz	3,928	100.00%
Total votes		3,928	100.00%

Republican primary results
Party	Candidate	Votes	%
Republican	Rod McMullin	4,498	50.61%
Republican	John Roeder (incumbent)	4,390	49.39%
Total votes		8,888	100.00%

General election results
Party	Candidate	Votes	%
Republican	Rod McMullin	14,559	63.61%
Democratic	Edith "Jo" Laetz	8,328	36.39%
Total votes		22,887	100.00%
Republican hold			

=== District 27 ===
Democratic primary results
Party	Candidate	Votes	%
Democratic	William T. Bill Crowley	3,278	51.15%
Democratic	Tom Alden	3,131	48.85%
Total votes		6,409	100.00%

Republican primary results
Party	Candidate	Votes	%
Republican	James A. (Jim) Mack (incumbent)	7,705	100.00%
Total votes		7,705	100.00%

Libertarian Primary Results
Party	Candidate	Votes	%
Libertarian	Dennis Davis	6	100.00%
Total votes		6	100.00%

General election results
Party	Candidate	Votes	%
Republican	James A. (Jim) Mack (incumbent)	18,142	54.59%
Democratic	William T. Bill Crowley	13,319	40.08%
Libertarian	Dennis Davis	1,770	5.33%
Total votes		33,231	100.00%
Republican hold			

=== District 28 ===
Democratic primary results
Party	Candidate	Votes	%
Democratic	G. H. "Dick" Shefrin	3,023	66.92%
Democratic	Earnest Forrester Romero	1,494	33.08%
Total votes		4,517	100.00%

Republican primary results
Party	Candidate	Votes	%
Republican	Robert B. Usdane	5,224	53.64%
Republican	A. "Mac" Carvalho	4,515	46.36%
Total votes		9,739	100.00%

Libertarian Primary Results
Party	Candidate	Votes	%
Libertarian	Richard K. Dodge	4	100.00%
Total votes		4	100.00%

General election results
Party	Candidate	Votes	%
Republican	Robert B. Usdane	16,099	60.20%
Democratic	G. H. "Dick" Shefrin	9,357	34.99%
Libertarian	Richard K. Dodge	1,285	4.81%
Total votes		26,741	100.00%
Republican hold			

=== District 29 ===
Democratic primary results
Party	Candidate	Votes	%
Democratic	Larry Friedman	3,552	100.00%
Total votes		3,552	100.00%

Republican primary results
Party	Candidate	Votes	%
Republican	Jack J. Taylor (incumbent)	5,752	71.34%
Republican	Don Crandall	2,311	28.66%
Total votes		8,063	100.00%

General election results
Party	Candidate	Votes	%
Republican	Jack J. Taylor (incumbent)	15,474	69.64%
Democratic	Larry Friedman	6,747	30.36%
Total votes		22,221	100.00%
Republican hold			

=== District 30 ===
Republican primary results
Party	Candidate	Votes	%
Republican	Stan Turley (incumbent)	8,438	100.00%
Total votes		8,438	100.00%

General election results
Party	Candidate	Votes	%
Republican	Stan Turley (incumbent)	23,352	100.00%
Total votes		23,352	100.00%
Republican hold			
