= 1974 Arizona Senate election =

- November 5, 1974

All 30 seats of the Arizona Senate 16 seats needed for a majority
	Majority party	Minority party
Party	Democratic	Republican
Seats before	12	18
Seats after	18	12
Seat change	▲6	▼6
Senate President before election
William C. Jacquin
Republican
Elected Senate President
Bob Stump
Democratic

The 1974 Arizona Senate election was held on November 5, 1974. Voters elected members of the Arizona Senate in all 30 of the state's legislative districts to serve a two-year term. Primary elections were held on September 10, 1974.

Prior to the elections, the Republicans held a majority of 18 seats over the Democrats' 12 seats.

Following the election, Democrats flipped control of the chamber and took a majority of 18 Democrats to 12 Republicans.

The newly elected senators served in the 32nd Arizona State Legislature.

== Summary of results by Arizona state legislative district ==
Legislative district	Incumbent	Party	Elected senator	Outcome
1st	Boyd Tenney	Rep	Boyd Tenney	Rep hold
2nd	Tony Gabaldon	Dem	Tony Gabaldon	Dem hold
3rd	Arthur J. Hubbard Sr.	Dem	Arthur J. Hubbard Sr.	Dem hold
4th	A.V. "Bill" Hardt	Dem	A.V. "Bill" Hardt	Dem hold
5th	Jones Osborn (Note: Democratic Senator Harold C. Giss died on April 15, 1973. He was replaced by Jones Osborn effective April 28, 1973.)	Dem	Jones Osborn	Dem hold
6th	Bob Stump	Dem	Bob Stump	Dem hold
7th	William L. Swink	Dem	William L. Swink	Dem hold
8th	Charles A. Awalt	Dem	Ed Sawyer	Dem hold
9th	John C. Scott Ulm	Dem	Steve Davis	Rep gain
10th	Sam Lena	Dem	Sam Lena	Dem hold
11th	Frank J. Felix	Dem	Frank J. Felix	Dem hold
12th	Douglas S. Holsclaw	Rep	Sue Dye	Dem gain
13th	Scott Alexander	Rep	Morris Farr	Dem gain
14th	William C. Jacquin	Rep	Lucy Davidson	Dem gain
15th	S.H. "Hal" Runyan	Rep	S.H. "Hal" Runyan	Rep hold
16th	Bob Strother	Rep	Marcia Weeks	Dem gain
17th	Fred Koory Jr.	Rep	Fred Koory Jr.	Rep hold
18th	Leo Corbet	Rep	Leo Corbet	Rep hold
19th	Ray Rottas	Rep	Madelene Van Arsdell	Dem gain
20th	Bess Stinson	Rep	Bill McCune	Rep hold
21st	Howard S. Baldwin	Rep	James P. Walsh	Dem gain
22nd	Manuel "Lito" Peña	Dem	Manuel "Lito" Peña	Dem hold
23rd	Alfredo Gutierrez	Dem	Alfredo Gutierrez	Dem hold
24th	Sandra Day O'Connor	Rep	John C. Pritzlaff, Jr.	Rep hold
25th	Trudy Camping	Rep	Betty Morrison	Dem gain
26th	John Roeder	Rep	John Roeder	Rep hold
27th	James A. (Jim) Mack	Rep	James A. (Jim) Mack	Rep hold
28th	David B. Kret	Rep	Bob Hungerford	Rep hold
29th	D. Delos Ellsworth	Rep	Jack J. Taylor	Rep hold
30th	Stan Turley	Rep	Stan Turley	Rep hold

== Detailed Results ==
=== District 1 ===
Democratic primary results
Party	Candidate	Votes	%
Democratic	A. H. (Hank) Bisjak	5,562	100.00%
Total votes		5,562	100.00%

Republican primary results
Party	Candidate	Votes	%
Republican	Boyd Tenney (incumbent)	6,308	100.00%
Total votes		6,308	100.00%

General election results
Party	Candidate	Votes	%
Republican	Boyd Tenney (incumbent)	13,469	56.80%
Democratic	A. H. (Hank) Bisjak	10,242	43.20%
Total votes		23,711	100.00%
Republican hold			

=== District 2 ===
Democratic primary results
Party	Candidate	Votes	%
Democratic	Tony Gabaldon (incumbent)	5,356	100.00%
Total votes		5,356	100.00%

General election results
Party	Candidate	Votes	%
Democratic	Tony Gabaldon (incumbent)	15,327	100.00%
Total votes		15,327	100.00%
Democratic hold			

=== District 3 ===
Democratic primary results
Party	Candidate	Votes	%
Democratic	Arthur J. Hubbard, Sr. (incumbent)	3,489	100.00%
Total votes		3,489	100.00%

General election results
Party	Candidate	Votes	%
Democratic	Arthur J. Hubbard, Sr. (incumbent)	12,598	100.00%
Total votes		12,598	100.00%
Democratic hold			

=== District 4 ===
Democratic primary results
Party	Candidate	Votes	%
Democratic	A.V. "Bill" Hardt (incumbent)	8,264	100.00%
Total votes		8,264	100.00%

General election results
Party	Candidate	Votes	%
Democratic	A.V. "Bill" Hardt (incumbent)	13,447	100.00%
Total votes		13,447	100.00%
Democratic hold			

=== District 5 ===
Democratic primary results
Party	Candidate	Votes	%
Democratic	Jones Osborn (incumbent)	4,577	100.00%
Total votes		4,577	100.00%

General election results
Party	Candidate	Votes	%
Democratic	Jones Osborn (incumbent)	10,046	100.00%
Total votes		10,046	100.00%
Democratic hold			

=== District 6 ===
Democratic primary results
Party	Candidate	Votes	%
Democratic	Bob Stump (incumbent)	4,321	100.00%
Total votes		4,321	100.00%

General election results
Party	Candidate	Votes	%
Democratic	Bob Stump (incumbent)	8,695	100.00%
Total votes		8,695	100.00%
Democratic hold			

=== District 7 ===
Democratic primary results
Party	Candidate	Votes	%
Democratic	William L. Swink (incumbent)	3,561	54.41%
Democratic	John N. Dore	2,984	45.59%
Total votes		6,545	100.00%

General election results
Party	Candidate	Votes	%
Democratic	William L. Swink (incumbent)	10,932	100.00%
Total votes		10,932	100.00%
Democratic hold			

=== District 8 ===
Democratic primary results
Party	Candidate	Votes	%
Democratic	Ed Sawyer	8,098	100.00%
Total votes		8,098	100.00%

General election results
Party	Candidate	Votes	%
Democratic	Ed Sawyer	15,219	100.00%
Total votes		15,219	100.00%
Democratic hold			

=== District 9 ===
Democratic primary results
Party	Candidate	Votes	%
Democratic	John (C) Scott Ulm (incumbent)	3,846	100.00%
Total votes		3,846	100.00%

Republican primary results
Party	Candidate	Votes	%
Republican	Stephen A. "Steve" Davis	2,643	100.00%
Total votes		2,643	100.00%

General election results
Party	Candidate	Votes	%
Republican	Stephen A. "Steve" Davis	7,799	50.52%
Democratic	John (C) Scott Ulm (incumbent)	7,639	49.48%
Total votes		15,438	100.00%
Republican gain from Democratic			

=== District 10 ===
Democratic primary results
Party	Candidate	Votes	%
Democratic	Sam Lena (incumbent)	3,830	100.00%
Total votes		3,830	100.00%

General election results
Party	Candidate	Votes	%
Democratic	Sam Lena (incumbent)	9,170	100.00%
Total votes		9,170	100.00%
Democratic hold			

=== District 11 ===
Democratic primary results
Party	Candidate	Votes	%
Democratic	Frank J. Felix (incumbent)	4,426	100.00%
Total votes		4,426	100.00%

General election results
Party	Candidate	Votes	%
Democratic	Frank J. Felix (incumbent)	11,732	100.00%
Total votes		11,732	100.00%
Democratic hold			

=== District 12 ===
Democratic primary results
Party	Candidate	Votes	%
Democratic	Sue Dye	4,579	100.00%
Total votes		4,579	100.00%

Republican primary results
Party	Candidate	Votes	%
Republican	Douglas S. Holsclaw (incumbent)	3,926	100.00%
Total votes		3,926	100.00%

General election results
Party	Candidate	Votes	%
Democratic	Sue Dye	11,173	50.94%
Republican	Douglas S. Holsclaw (incumbent)	10,760	49.06%
Total votes		21,933	100.00%
Democratic gain from Republican			

=== District 13 ===
Democratic primary results
Party	Candidate	Votes	%
Democratic	Morris Farr	3,607	56.87%
Democratic	James J. DiPietro	1,640	25.86%
Democratic	Norman D. Clark	1,096	17.28%
Total votes		6,343	100.00%

Republican primary results
Party	Candidate	Votes	%
Republican	H. Thomas (Tom) Kincaid	4,351	100.00%
Total votes		4,351	100.00%

General election results
Party	Candidate	Votes	%
Democratic	Morris Farr	11,772	54.21%
Republican	H. Thomas (Tom) Kincaid	9,944	45.79%
Total votes		21,716	100.00%
Democratic gain from Republican			

=== District 14 ===
Democratic primary results
Party	Candidate	Votes	%
Democratic	Lucy Davidson	4,602	74.19%
Democratic	Henry "Hank" Kendrick	1,601	25.81%
Total votes		6,203	100.00%

Republican primary results
Party	Candidate	Votes	%
Republican	Charles King	5,357	100.00%
Total votes		5,357	100.00%

General election results
Party	Candidate	Votes	%
Democratic	Lucy Davidson	13,523	53.31%
Republican	Charles King	11,842	46.69%
Total votes		25,365	100.00%
Democratic gain from Republican			

=== District 15 ===
Democratic primary results
Party	Candidate	Votes	%
Democratic	Tom Wheeler	3,455	100.00%
Total votes		3,455	100.00%

Republican primary results
Party	Candidate	Votes	%
Republican	S. H. "Hal" Runyan (incumbent)	5,446	100.00%
Total votes		5,446	100.00%

General election results
Party	Candidate	Votes	%
Republican	S. H. "Hal" Runyan (incumbent)	10,311	59.31%
Democratic	Tom Wheeler	7,075	40.69%
Total votes		17,386	100.00%
Republican hold			

=== District 16 ===
Democratic primary results
Party	Candidate	Votes	%
Democratic	Marcia Weeks	3,574	63.12%
Democratic	Clark Shelby	2,088	36.88%
Total votes		5,662	100.00%

Republican primary results
Party	Candidate	Votes	%
Republican	Bob Strother (incumbent)	5,756	100.00%
Total votes		5,756	100.00%

General election results
Party	Candidate	Votes	%
Democratic	Marcia Weeks	12,023	53.30%
Republican	Bob Strother (incumbent)	10,535	46.70%
Total votes		22,558	100.00%
Democratic gain from Republican			

=== District 17 ===
Democratic primary results
Party	Candidate	Votes	%
Democratic	Tom Flaherty	4,134	100.00%
Total votes		4,134	100.00%

Republican primary results
Party	Candidate	Votes	%
Republican	Fred Koory, Jr. (incumbent)	7,512	100.00%
Total votes		7,512	100.00%

General election results
Party	Candidate	Votes	%
Republican	Fred Koory, Jr. (incumbent)	15,174	61.95%
Democratic	Tom Flaherty	9,318	38.05%
Total votes		24,492	100.00%
Republican hold			

=== District 18 ===
Democratic primary results
Party	Candidate	Votes	%
Democratic	H. E. "Pat" Patterson	4,039	100.00%
Total votes		4,039	100.00%

Republican primary results
Party	Candidate	Votes	%
Republican	Leo Corbet (incumbent)	6,237	100.00%
Total votes		6,237	100.00%

General election results
Party	Candidate	Votes	%
Republican	Leo Corbet (incumbent)	10,783	55.65%
Democratic	H. E. "Pat" Patterson	8,594	44.35%
Total votes		19,377	100.00%
Republican hold			

=== District 19 ===
Democratic primary results
Party	Candidate	Votes	%
Democratic	Madelene Van Arsdell	2,998	64.25%
Democratic	Al Hales	1,668	35.75%
Total votes		4,666	100.00%

Republican primary results
Party	Candidate	Votes	%
Republican	Ray Rottas (incumbent)	4,187	59.51%
Republican	Michael Clarke	2,849	40.49%
Total votes		7,036	100.00%

General election results
Party	Candidate	Votes	%
Democratic	Madelene Van Arsdell	9,588	50.30%
Republican	Ray Rottas (incumbent)	9,473	49.70%
Total votes		19,061	100.00%
Democratic gain from Republican			

=== District 20 ===
Democratic primary results
Party	Candidate	Votes	%
Democratic	Wayne O. Earley	2,564	55.06%
Democratic	Roland W. James	2,093	44.94%
Total votes		4,657	100.00%

Republican primary results
Party	Candidate	Votes	%
Republican	Bill McCune	3,736	100.00%
Total votes		3,736	100.00%

General election results
Party	Candidate	Votes	%
Republican	Bill McCune	8,129	53.47%
Democratic	Wayne O. Earley	7,074	46.53%
Total votes		15,203	100.00%
Republican hold			

=== District 21 ===
Democratic primary results
Party	Candidate	Votes	%
Democratic	James P. Walsh	4,144	100.00%
Total votes		4,144	100.00%

Republican primary results
Party	Candidate	Votes	%
Republican	Howard S. Baldwin (incumbent)	3,584	73.67%
Republican	Art Meehan	1,281	26.33%
Total votes		4,865	100.00%

General election results
Party	Candidate	Votes	%
Democratic	James P. Walsh	8,407	52.04%
Republican	Howard S. Baldwin (incumbent)	7,747	47.96%
Total votes		16,154	100.00%
Democratic gain from Republican			

=== District 22 ===
Democratic primary results
Party	Candidate	Votes	%
Democratic	Manuel "Lito" Pena (incumbent)	3,920	100.00%
Total votes		3,920	100.00%

General election results
Party	Candidate	Votes	%
Democratic	Manuel "Lito" Pena (incumbent)	7,836	100.00%
Total votes		7,836	100.00%
Democratic hold			

=== District 23 ===
Democratic primary results
Party	Candidate	Votes	%
Democratic	Alfredo Gutierrez (incumbent)	3,002	51.51%
Democratic	Cloves C. Campbell	2,826	48.49%
Total votes		5,828	100.00%

General election results
Party	Candidate	Votes	%
Democratic	Alfredo Gutierrez (incumbent)	6,695	100.00%
Total votes		6,695	100.00%
Democratic hold			

=== District 24 ===
Democratic primary results
Party	Candidate	Votes	%
Democratic	Carl G. Pettijohn	4,456	100.00%
Total votes		4,456	100.00%

Republican primary results
Party	Candidate	Votes	%
Republican	John C. Pritzlaff, Jr.	9,170	100.00%
Total votes		9,170	100.00%

General election results
Party	Candidate	Votes	%
Republican	John C. Pritzlaff, Jr.	16,450	57.87%
Democratic	Carl G. Pettijohn	11,969	42.11%
Independent	James H. Waterhouse (Note: Write-in candidate.)	6	0.02%
Total votes		28,425	100.00%
Republican hold			

=== District 25 ===
Democratic primary results
Party	Candidate	Votes	%
Democratic	Betty Morrison	3,280	65.84%
Democratic	Archie C. Ryan	1,702	34.16%
Total votes		4,982	100.00%

Republican primary results
Party	Candidate	Votes	%
Republican	Trudy Camping (incumbent)	2,605	61.57%
Republican	Sandra Davies	1,626	38.43%
Total votes		4,231	100.00%

General election results
Party	Candidate	Votes	%
Democratic	Betty Morrison	8,159	52.90%
Republican	Trudy Camping (incumbent)	7,265	47.10%
Total votes		15,424	100.00%
Democratic gain from Republican			

=== District 26 ===
Democratic primary results
Party	Candidate	Votes	%
Democratic	Dr. John E. McNamara	2,155	53.13%
Democratic	Art McBrayer	1,901	46.87%
Total votes		4,056	100.00%

Republican primary results
Party	Candidate	Votes	%
Republican	John Roeder (incumbent)	6,213	100.00%
Total votes		6,213	100.00%

General election results
Party	Candidate	Votes	%
Republican	John Roeder (incumbent)	10,689	56.07%
Democratic	Dr. John E. McNamara	8,376	43.93%
Total votes		19,065	100.00%
Republican hold			

=== District 27 ===
Democratic primary results
Party	Candidate	Votes	%
Democratic	C. L. "Clif" Harkins	4,529	100.00%
Total votes		4,529	100.00%

Republican primary results
Party	Candidate	Votes	%
Republican	James A. (Jim) Mack (incumbent)	5,757	100.00%
Total votes		5,757	100.00%

General election results
Party	Candidate	Votes	%
Republican	James A. (Jim) Mack (incumbent)	12,382	55.30%
Democratic	C. L. "Clif" Harkins	10,009	44.70%
Total votes		22,391	100.00%
Republican hold			

=== District 28 ===
Republican primary results
Party	Candidate	Votes	%
Republican	Bob Hungerford	5,283	68.22%
Republican	Roseanne Carter	2,461	31.78%
Total votes		7,744	100.00%

General election results
Party	Candidate	Votes	%
Republican	Bob Hungerford	14,930	100.00%
Total votes		14,930	100.00%
Republican hold			

=== District 29 ===
Democratic primary results
Party	Candidate	Votes	%
Democratic	Ruben R. Martinez	3,021	100.00%
Total votes		3,021	100.00%

Republican primary results
Party	Candidate	Votes	%
Republican	Jack J. Taylor	5,842	100.00%
Total votes		5,842	100.00%

General election results
Party	Candidate	Votes	%
Republican	Jack J. Taylor	11,099	66.08%
Democratic	Ruben R. Martinez	5,698	33.92%
Total votes		16,797	100.00%
Republican hold			

=== District 30 ===
Democratic primary results
Party	Candidate	Votes	%
Democratic	Clifford L. Searcy	3,415	100.00%
Total votes		3,415	100.00%

Republican primary results
Party	Candidate	Votes	%
Republican	Stan Turley (incumbent)	4,386	68.95%
Republican	Jim Phipps	1,975	31.05%
Total votes		6,361	100.00%

General election results
Party	Candidate	Votes	%
Republican	Stan Turley (incumbent)	11,752	61.78%
Democratic	Clifford L. Searcy	7,271	38.22%
Total votes		19,023	100.00%
Republican hold			
