= 32nd Arizona State Legislature =

Session of the Arizona Legislature

←	31st	33rd	→
- Arizona State Capitol (2014)

Overview
- Legislative body: Arizona State Legislature
- Jurisdiction: Arizona, United States
- Term: January 1, 1975 – December 31, 1976

Senate
- Members: 30
- Party control: Democrat (18–12)

House of Representatives
- Members: 60
- Party control: Republican (33–27)

Sessions
- 1st: January 13 – June 13, 1975
- 2nd: January 12 – June 24, 1976

Special sessions
- 1st: January 12 – March 1, 1976

The 32nd Arizona State Legislature, consisting of the Arizona State Senate and the Arizona House of Representatives, was constituted in Phoenix from January 1, 1975, to December 31, 1976, during the first two years of Raúl Héctor Castro's single term as Governor of Arizona. Both the Senate and the House membership remained constant at 30 and 60, respectively. The Democrats reversed the margin of control in the upper house, gaining an 18–12 edge in the senate, while they also made inroads in the Republican's majority in the house, although the Republicans still controlled the lower body with a 33–27 margin.

== Sessions ==
The Legislature met for two regular sessions at the State Capitol in Phoenix. The first opened on January 13, 1975, and adjourned on June 13; while the second convened on January 12, 1976, and adjourned on June 24. There was a single Special Session, convened on January 12, 1976, and adjourned on March 1, 1976.

== State Senate ==
=== Members ===
The asterisk (*) denotes members of the previous Legislature who continued in office as members of this Legislature.

District	Senator	Party	Notes
1	Boyd Tenney*	Republican	
2	Tony Gabaldon*	Democrat	
3	Arthur J. Hubbard Sr.*	Democrat	
4	A. V. "Bill" Hardt*	Democrat	
5	Jones Osborn*	Democrat	
6	Bob Stump*	Democrat	
7	William L. Swink*	Democrat	
8	Ed Sawyer	Democrat	
9	Stephen A. Davis	Republican	
10	Tom Moore	Democrat	
11	Frank J. Felix*	Democrat	
12	Sue Dye	Democrat	
13	Morris Farr	Democrat	
14	Lucy Davidson	Democrat	
15	S. H. Runyan*	Republican	
16	Marcia Weeks	Democrat	
17	Fred Koory Jr.*	Republican	
18	Leo Corbet*	Republican	
19	Madelene Van Arsdell	Democrat	
20	Bill McCune	Republican	
21	James P. Walsh	Democrat	
22	Manuel "Lito" Pena*	Democrat	
23	Alfredo Gutierrez*	Democrat	
24	John C. Pritzlaff Jr.	Republican	
25	Betty Morrison	Democrat	
26	John Roeder*	Republican	
27	James A. Mack*	Republican	
28	Bob Hungerford	Republican	
29	Jack J. Taylor	Republican	
30	Stan Turley*	Republican	

== House of Representatives ==
=== Members ===
The asterisk (*) denotes members of the previous Legislature who continued in office as members of this Legislature.

District	Representative	Party	Notes
1	John U. Hays	Republican	
1	James Thomas	Democrat	
2	Sam A. McConnell Jr.*	Republican	
2	John Wettaw*	Republican	
3	Benjamin Hanley*	Democrat	
3	Daniel Peaches	Republican	
4	Edward G. Guerrero*	Democrat	
4	E. C. "Polly" Rosenbaum*	Democrat	
5	Elwood W. Bradford*	Democrat	
5	Jim Phillips*	Democrat	
6	G. T. Alley*	Democrat	
6	Polly Getzwiller*	Democrat	
7	Craig E. Davids*	Democrat	
7	Richard Pacheco*	Democrat	
8	James A. Elliott	Democrat	
8	Steve Vukcevich	Democrat	
9	J. H. (Jim) Dewberry Jr.*	Democrat	
9	Thomas B. Richey	Republican	
10	Larry Bahill *	Democrat	
10	Carmen Cajero *	Democrat	
11	Emilio Carrillo*	Democrat	
11	R. P. "Bob" Fricks*	Democrat	
12	Jo Cauthorn	Democrat	
12	Thomas N. Goodwin*	Republican	
13	Clare Dunn	Democrat	
13	Bruce Wheeler	Democrat	
14	W. A. "Tony" Buehl*	Republican	
14	Anna J. Cullinan	Democrat	
15	J. Herbert Everett*	Republican	
15	James B. Ratliff*	Republican	
16	Diane B. McCarthy*	Republican	
16	Don Stewart*	Republican	
17	C. W. "Bill" Lewis*	Republican	
17	Anne Lindeman*	Republican	
18	Burton S. Barr*	Republican	
18	Ruth Peck*	Republican	
19	Stan Akers*	Republican	
19	W. A. "Tony" West Jr.	Republican	
20	Susan Louise James	Democrat	
20	Gerald F. Moore	Democrat	
21	Keith W. Hubbard	Republican	
21	Elizabeth Adams Rockwell*	Republican	
22	Art Hamilton*	Democrat	
22	R. G. "Danny" Pena*	Democrat	
23	Tony R. Abril*	Democrat	
23	Leon Thompson*	Democrat	
24	Pete Corpstein*	Republican	
24	Cal Holman*	Republican	
25	D. Lee Jones*	Republican	
25	Jim Skelly*	Republican	
26	Peter Kay*	Republican	
26	Frank Kelley*	Republican	
27	Dick Flynn	Republican	
27	Juanita Harelson	Republican	
28	Americo Carvalho*	Republican	
28	William E. Rigel	Republican	
29	Donna J. Carlson	Republican	
29	Jim L. Cooper*	Republican	
30	Carl J. Kunasek*	Republican	
30	James J. Sossaman*	Republican	
