= 1972 Arizona Senate election =

- November 7, 1972

All 30 seats of the Arizona Senate 16 seats needed for a majority
| | Majority party | Minority party |
|---|---|---|
| Party | Republican | Democratic |
| Seats before | 18 | 12 |
| Seats after | 18 | 12 |
| Seat change | Steady | Steady |
Senate President before election
William C. Jacquin
Republican
Elected Senate President
William C. Jacquin
Republican

The 1972 Arizona Senate election was held on November 7, 1972. Voters elected members of the Arizona Senate in all 30 of the state's legislative districts to serve a two-year term. Primary elections were held on September 12, 1972.

Prior to the elections, the Republicans held a majority of 18 seats over the Democrats' 12 seats.

Following the election, Republicans maintained control of the chamber, and their majority with 18 Republicans to 12 Democrats remained unchanged.

The newly elected senators served in the 31st Arizona State Legislature.

== Retiring incumbents ==
=== Democrats ===
1. District 2: Thomas M. "Tommy" Knoles Jr.
2. District 4: John W. McLaughlin
3. District 6: E. B. "Blodie" Thode
4. District 9: James F. McNulty Jr.
5. District 10: Joe Castillo

=== Republicans ===
1. District 3: Roy Palmer
2. District 17: Ray A. Goetze
3. District 21: John B. Conlan

== Incumbents defeated in primary elections ==
=== Democrats ===
1. District 11: F. T. "Limie" Gibbings
2. District 23: Cloves C. Campbell (Note: Redistricted from district 28 to 23.)

=== Republican ===
1. District 21: Joe Shaughnessy Jr. (Note: Redistricted from district 18 to 21.)

== Summary of results by Arizona state legislative district ==
| District | Incumbent | Party | Elected senator | Outcome |
|---|---|---|---|---|
| 1st | Boyd Tenney | Rep | Boyd Tenney | Rep Hold |
| 2nd | Thomas M. "Tommy" Knoles Jr. | Dem | Tony Gabaldon | Dem Hold |
| 3rd | Roy Palmer | Rep | Arthur J. Hubbard, Sr. | Dem Gain |
| 4th | John W. McLaughlin | Dem | A.V. "Bill" Hardt (Note: Redistricted from district 7 to 4.) | Dem Hold |
| 5th | Harold C. Giss | Dem | Harold C. Giss | Dem Hold |
| 6th | E. B. "Blodie" Thode | Dem | Bob Stump (Note: Redistricted from district 27 to 6.) | Dem Hold |
| 7th | A. V. "Bill" Hardt | Dem | William L. Swink | Dem Hold |
| 8th | Charles A. Awalt | Dem | Charles A. Awalt | Dem Hold |
| 9th | James F. McNulty Jr. | Dem | John C. Scott Ulm | Dem Hold |
| 10th | Joe Castillo | Dem | Sam Lena (Note: Redistricted from district 12 to 10.) | Dem Hold |
| 11th | F. T. "Limie" Gibbings | Dem | Frank J. Felix | Dem Hold |
| 12th | Sam Lena | Dem | Douglas S. Holsclaw (Note: Redistricted from district 13 to 12.) | Rep Gain |
| 13th | Douglas S. Holsclaw | Rep | Scott Alexander (Note: Redistricted from district 14 to 13.) | Rep Hold |
| 14th | Scott Alexander | Rep | William C. Jacquin (Note: Redistricted from district 15 to 14.) | Rep Hold |
| 15th | William C. Jacquin | Rep | S.H. "Hal" Runyan | Rep Hold |
| 16th | Fred Koory Jr. (Note: Redistricted from district 16 to 17.) | Rep | Bob Strother | Rep Hold |
| 17th | Ray A. Goetze | Rep | Fred Koory Jr. | Rep Hold |
| 18th | Joe Shaughnessy Jr. | Rep | Leo Corbet (Note: Redistricted from district 23 to 18.) | Rep Hold |
| 19th | Ray Rottas | Rep | Ray Rottas | Rep Hold |
| 20th | Sandra Day O'Connor (Note: Redistricted from district 20 to 24.) | Rep | Bess Stinson (Note: Redistricted from district 22 to 20.) | Rep Hold |
| 21st | John B. Conlan | Rep | Howard S. Baldwin (Note: Redistricted from district 24 to 21.) | Rep Hold |
| 22nd | Bess Stinson | Rep | Manuel "Lito" Peña | Dem Gain |
| 23rd | Leo Corbet | Rep | Alfredo Gutierrez | Dem Gain |
| 24th | Howard S. Baldwin | Rep | Sandra Day O'Connor | Rep Hold |
| 25th | Trudy Camping | Rep | Trudy Camping | Rep Hold |
| 26th | David B. Kret (Note: Redistricted from district 26 to 28.) | Rep | John Roeder | Rep Hold |
| 27th | Bob Stump | Dem | James A. (Jim) Mack (Note: Redistricted from district 29 to 27.) | Rep Gain |
| 28th | Cloves C. Campbell | Dem | David B. Kret | Rep Gain |
| 29th | James A. (Jim) Mack | Rep | D. Delos Ellsworth (Note: Redistricted from district 30 to 29.) | Rep Hold |
| 30th | D. Delos Ellsworth | Rep | Stan Turley | Rep Hold |

== Detailed results ==
=== District 1 ===
Republican primary results
| Party | Candidate | Votes | % |
|---|---|---|---|
| Republican | Boyd Tenney (incumbent) | 6,386 | 100.00% |
| Total votes | | 6,386 | 100.00% |

General election results
| Party | Candidate | Votes | % |
|---|---|---|---|
| Republican | Boyd Tenney (incumbent) | 19,408 | 100.00% |
| Total votes | | 19,408 | 100.00% |
| Republican hold | | | |

=== District 2 ===
Democratic primary results
| Party | Candidate | Votes | % |
|---|---|---|---|
| Democratic | Tony Gabaldon | 6,386 | 100.00% |
| Total votes | | 6,386 | 100.00% |

Republican primary results
| Party | Candidate | Votes | % |
|---|---|---|---|
| Republican | Larry Loven | 4,019 | 100.00% |
| Total votes | | 4,019 | 100.00% |

General election results
| Party | Candidate | Votes | % |
|---|---|---|---|
| Democratic | Tony Gabaldon | 11,807 | 56.27% |
| Republican | Larry Loven | 9,176 | 43.73% |
| Total votes | | 20,983 | 100.00% |
| Democratic hold | | | |

=== District 3 ===
Democratic primary results
| Party | Candidate | Votes | % |
|---|---|---|---|
| Democratic | Arthur J. Hubbard, Sr. | 2,154 | 53.52% |
| Democratic | Lloyd L. House | 1,871 | 46.48% |
| Total votes | | 4,025 | 100.00% |

Republican primary results
| Party | Candidate | Votes | % |
|---|---|---|---|
| Republican | Fred Burke (Note: Fred Burke was a write-in candidate in the primary.) | 131 | 100.00% |
| Total votes | | 131 | 100.00% |

General election results
| Party | Candidate | Votes | % |
|---|---|---|---|
| Democratic | Arthur J. Hubbard, Sr. | 8,371 | 66.35% |
| Republican | Fred Burke | 4,245 | 33.65% |
| Total votes | | 12,616 | 100.00% |
| Democratic gain from Republican | | | |

=== District 4 ===
Democratic primary results
| Party | Candidate | Votes | % |
|---|---|---|---|
| Democratic | A. V. "Bill" Hardt (incumbent) | 11,701 | 100.00% |
| Total votes | | 11,701 | 100.00% |

Republican primary results
| Party | Candidate | Votes | % |
|---|---|---|---|
| Republican | Earl C. Cunningham (Note: Earl C. Cunningham was a write-in candidate in the primary.) | 266 | 100.00% |
| Total votes | | 266 | 100.00% |

General election results
| Party | Candidate | Votes | % |
|---|---|---|---|
| Democratic | A. V. "Bill" Hardt (incumbent) | 12,741 | 67.07% |
| Republican | Earl C. Cunningham | 6,256 | 32.93% |
| Total votes | | 18,997 | 100.00% |
| Democratic hold | | | |

=== District 5 ===
Democratic primary results
| Party | Candidate | Votes | % |
|---|---|---|---|
| Democratic | Harold C. Giss (incumbent) | 5,912 | 100.00% |
| Total votes | | 5,912 | 100.00% |

General election results
| Party | Candidate | Votes | % |
|---|---|---|---|
| Democratic | Harold C. Giss (incumbent) | 11,783 | 100.00% |
| Total votes | | 11,783 | 100.00% |
| Democratic hold | | | |

=== District 6 ===
Democratic primary results
| Party | Candidate | Votes | % |
|---|---|---|---|
| Democratic | Bob Stump (incumbent) | 2,956 | 53.16% |
| Democratic | Dorothy Leuser | 2,605 | 46.84% |
| Total votes | | 5,561 | 100.00% |

General election results
| Party | Candidate | Votes | % |
|---|---|---|---|
| Democratic | Bob Stump (incumbent) | 9,742 | 100.00% |
| Total votes | | 9,742 | 100.00% |
| Democratic hold | | | |

=== District 7 ===
Democratic primary results
| Party | Candidate | Votes | % |
|---|---|---|---|
| Democratic | William L. Swink | 6,301 | 100.00% |
| Total votes | | 6,301 | 100.00% |

General election results
| Party | Candidate | Votes | % |
|---|---|---|---|
| Democratic | William L. Swink | 11,992 | 100.00% |
| Total votes | | 11,992 | 100.00% |
| Democratic hold | | | |

=== District 8 ===
Democratic primary results
| Party | Candidate | Votes | % |
|---|---|---|---|
| Democratic | Charles A. Awalt (incumbent) | 7,812 | 62.37% |
| Democratic | James A. "Jim" Elliott | 4,714 | 37.63% |
| Total votes | | 12,526 | 100.00% |

General election results
| Party | Candidate | Votes | % |
|---|---|---|---|
| Democratic | Charles A. Awalt (incumbent) | 16,714 | 100.00% |
| Total votes | | 16,714 | 100.00% |
| Democratic hold | | | |

=== District 9 ===
Democratic primary results
| Party | Candidate | Votes | % |
|---|---|---|---|
| Democratic | John (C.) Scott Ulm | 4,244 | 100.00% |
| Total votes | | 4,244 | 100.00% |

Republican primary results
| Party | Candidate | Votes | % |
|---|---|---|---|
| Republican | Clint Mellor | 3,002 | 100.00% |
| Total votes | | 3,002 | 100.00% |

General election results
| Party | Candidate | Votes | % |
|---|---|---|---|
| Democratic | John (C.) Scott Ulm | 10,293 | 60.42% |
| Republican | Clint Mellor | 6,743 | 39.58% |
| Total votes | | 17,036 | 100.00% |
| Democratic hold | | | |

=== District 10 ===
Democratic primary results
| Party | Candidate | Votes | % |
|---|---|---|---|
| Democratic | Sam Lena (incumbent) | 5,112 | 100.00% |
| Total votes | | 5,112 | 100.00% |

General election results
| Party | Candidate | Votes | % |
|---|---|---|---|
| Democratic | Sam Lena (incumbent) | 12,163 | 100.00% |
| Total votes | | 12,163 | 100.00% |
| Democratic hold | | | |

=== District 11 ===
Democratic primary results
| Party | Candidate | Votes | % |
|---|---|---|---|
| Democratic | Frank J. Felix | 4,501 | 68.28% |
| Democratic | F. T. "Limie" Gibbings (incumbent) | 2,091 | 31.72% |
| Total votes | | 6,592 | 100.00% |

General election results
| Party | Candidate | Votes | % |
|---|---|---|---|
| Democratic | Frank J. Felix | 14,419 | 100.00% |
| Total votes | | 14,419 | 100.00% |
| Democratic hold | | | |

=== District 12 ===
Republican primary results
| Party | Candidate | Votes | % |
|---|---|---|---|
| Republican | Douglas S. Holsclaw (incumbent) | 4,850 | 100.00% |
| Total votes | | 4,850 | 100.00% |

General election results
| Party | Candidate | Votes | % |
|---|---|---|---|
| Republican | Douglas S. Holsclaw (incumbent) | 16,875 | 78.06% |
| Good Neighbors Union (GNU) | Carolyn Meinel Henson | 4,743 | 21.94% |
| Total votes | | 21,618 | 100.00% |
| Republican gain from Democratic | | | |

=== District 13 ===
Democratic primary results
| Party | Candidate | Votes | % |
|---|---|---|---|
| Democratic | Dr. James J. DiPietro | 5,522 | 100.00% |
| Total votes | | 5,522 | 100.00% |

Republican primary results
| Party | Candidate | Votes | % |
|---|---|---|---|
| Republican | Scott Alexander (incumbent) | 5,310 | 100.00% |
| Total votes | | 5,310 | 100.00% |

General election results
| Party | Candidate | Votes | % |
|---|---|---|---|
| Republican | Scott Alexander (incumbent) | 15,450 | 62.12% |
| Democratic | Dr. James J. DiPietro | 9,421 | 37.88% |
| Total votes | | 24,871 | 100.00% |
| Republican hold | | | |

=== District 14 ===
Republican primary results
| Party | Candidate | Votes | % |
|---|---|---|---|
| Republican | William C. Jacquin (incumbent) | 6,476 | 100.00% |
| Total votes | | 6,476 | 100.00% |

General election results
| Party | Candidate | Votes | % |
|---|---|---|---|
| Republican | William C. Jacquin (incumbent) | 21,227 | 100.00% |
| Total votes | | 21,227 | 100.00% |
| Republican hold | | | |

=== District 15 ===
Democratic primary results
| Party | Candidate | Votes | % |
|---|---|---|---|
| Democratic | Ewell M. Collins | 3,260 | 100.00% |
| Total votes | | 3,260 | 100.00% |

Republican primary results
| Party | Candidate | Votes | % |
|---|---|---|---|
| Republican | S.H. "Hal" Runyan | 6,142 | 100.00% |
| Total votes | | 6,142 | 100.00% |

General election results
| Party | Candidate | Votes | % |
|---|---|---|---|
| Republican | S. H. "Hal" Runyan | 13,031 | 68.23% |
| Democratic | Ewell M. Collins | 6,067 | 31.77% |
| Total votes | | 19,098 | 100.00% |
| Republican hold | | | |

=== District 16 ===
Democratic primary results
| Party | Candidate | Votes | % |
|---|---|---|---|
| Democratic | William T. (Bill) Crowley | 3,919 | 100.00% |
| Total votes | | 3,919 | 100.00% |

Republican primary results
| Party | Candidate | Votes | % |
|---|---|---|---|
| Republican | Bob Strother | 2,946 | 45.05% |
| Republican | Fred L. Schmitt | 2,271 | 34.73% |
| Republican | Dick Singer | 1,322 | 20.22% |
| Total votes | | 6,539 | 100.00% |

General election results
| Party | Candidate | Votes | % |
|---|---|---|---|
| Republican | Bob Strother | 14,627 | 61.12% |
| Democratic | William T. (Bill) Crowley | 9,305 | 38.88% |
| Total votes | | 23,932 | 100.00% |
| Republican hold | | | |

=== District 17 ===
Democratic primary results
| Party | Candidate | Votes | % |
|---|---|---|---|
| Democratic | Audrey E. Kaslo | 2,997 | 100.00% |
| Total votes | | 2,997 | 100.00% |

Republican primary results
| Party | Candidate | Votes | % |
|---|---|---|---|
| Republican | Fred Koory Jr. (incumbent) | 5,894 | 100.00% |
| Total votes | | 5,894 | 100.00% |

General election results
| Party | Candidate | Votes | % |
|---|---|---|---|
| Republican | Fred Koory Jr. (incumbent) | 15,300 | 70.32% |
| Democratic | Audrey E. Kaslo | 6,458 | 29.68% |
| Total votes | | 21,758 | 100.00% |
| Republican hold | | | |

=== District 18 ===
Democratic primary results
| Party | Candidate | Votes | % |
|---|---|---|---|
| Democratic | Zachary Winograd | 3,721 | 100.00% |
| Total votes | | 3,721 | 100.00% |

Republican primary results
| Party | Candidate | Votes | % |
|---|---|---|---|
| Republican | Leo Corbet (incumbent) | 6,884 | 100.00% |
| Total votes | | 6,884 | 100.00% |

General election results
| Party | Candidate | Votes | % |
|---|---|---|---|
| Republican | Leo Corbet (incumbent) | 15,639 | 68.36% |
| Democratic | Zachary Winograd | 7,238 | 31.64% |
| Total votes | | 22,877 | 100.00% |
| Republican hold | | | |

=== District 19 ===
Democratic primary results
| Party | Candidate | Votes | % |
|---|---|---|---|
| Democratic | Madelene Van Arsdell | 3,732 | 100.00% |
| Total votes | | 3,732 | 100.00% |

Republican primary results
| Party | Candidate | Votes | % |
|---|---|---|---|
| Republican | Ray Rottas (incumbent) | 6,708 | 100.00% |
| Total votes | | 6,708 | 100.00% |

General election results
| Party | Candidate | Votes | % |
|---|---|---|---|
| Republican | Ray Rottas (incumbent) | 13,036 | 58.58% |
| Democratic | Madelene Van Arsdell | 9,219 | 41.42% |
| Total votes | | 22,255 | 100.00% |
| Republican hold | | | |

=== District 20 ===
Democratic primary results
| Party | Candidate | Votes | % |
|---|---|---|---|
| Democratic | John Vanlandingham | 2,802 | 66.54% |
| Democratic | Al Frantz | 1,409 | 33.46% |
| Total votes | | 4,211 | 100.00% |

Republican primary results
| Party | Candidate | Votes | % |
|---|---|---|---|
| Republican | Bess B. Stinson (incumbent) | 3,174 | 67.33% |
| Republican | Paul Cullor | 1,540 | 32.67% |
| Total votes | | 4,714 | 100.00% |

General election results
| Party | Candidate | Votes | % |
|---|---|---|---|
| Republican | Bess B. Stinson (incumbent) | 10,023 | 54.18% |
| Democratic | John Vanlandingham | 8,478 | 45.82% |
| Total votes | | 18,501 | 100.00% |
| Republican hold | | | |

=== District 21 ===
Democratic primary results
| Party | Candidate | Votes | % |
|---|---|---|---|
| Democratic | John J. Helmick | 3,960 | 100.00% |
| Total votes | | 3,960 | 100.00% |

Republican primary results
| Party | Candidate | Votes | % |
|---|---|---|---|
| Republican | Howard S. Baldwin (incumbent) | 3,271 | 54.68% |
| Republican | Joe Shaughnessy Jr. (incumbent) | 2,711 | 45.32% |
| Total votes | | 5,982 | 100.00% |

General election results
| Party | Candidate | Votes | % |
|---|---|---|---|
| Republican | Howard S. Baldwin (incumbent) | 12,169 | 60.17% |
| Democratic | John J. Helmick | 8,055 | 39.83% |
| Total votes | | 20,224 | 100.00% |
| Republican hold | | | |

=== District 22 ===
Democratic primary results
| Party | Candidate | Votes | % |
|---|---|---|---|
| Democratic | Manuel "Lito" Peña | 2,535 | 57.03% |
| Democratic | Louis Monteilh | 1,383 | 31.11% |
| Democratic | Jaime Martinez | 527 | 11.86% |
| Total votes | | 4,445 | 100.00% |

American Independent Party primary results
| Party | Candidate | Votes | % |
|---|---|---|---|
| American Independent | Robert Vincent O'Connor (Note: Ran as a write-in candidate.) | 2 | 100.00% |
| Total votes | | 2 | 100.00% |

General election results
| Party | Candidate | Votes | % |
|---|---|---|---|
| Democratic | Manuel "Lito" Peña | 9,371 | 100.00% |
| Total votes | | 9,371 | 100.00% |
| Democratic gain from Republican | | | |

=== District 23 ===
Democratic primary results
| Party | Candidate | Votes | % |
|---|---|---|---|
| Democratic | Alfredo Gutierrez | 2,624 | 51.36% |
| Democratic | Cloves C. Campbell (incumbent) | 2,485 | 48.64% |
| Total votes | | 5,109 | 100.00% |

General election results
| Party | Candidate | Votes | % |
|---|---|---|---|
| Democratic | Alfredo Gutierrez | 6,707 | 100.00% |
| Total votes | | 6,707 | 100.00% |
| Democratic gain from Republican | | | |

=== District 24 ===
Democratic primary results
| Party | Candidate | Votes | % |
|---|---|---|---|
| Democratic | Rivko Knox | 3,577 | 100.00% |
| Total votes | | 3,577 | 100.00% |

Republican primary results
| Party | Candidate | Votes | % |
|---|---|---|---|
| Republican | Sandra Day O'Connor (incumbent) | 9,202 | 100.00% |
| Total votes | | 9,202 | 100.00% |

General election results
| Party | Candidate | Votes | % |
|---|---|---|---|
| Republican | Sandra Day O'Connor (incumbent) | 21,613 | 74.42% |
| Democratic | Rivko Knox | 7,427 | 25.58% |
| Total votes | | 29,040 | 100.00% |
| Republican hold | | | |

=== District 25 ===
Democratic primary results
| Party | Candidate | Votes | % |
|---|---|---|---|
| Democratic | Betty Morrison | 2,682 | 54.77% |
| Democratic | Archie C. Ryan | 2,215 | 45.23% |
| Total votes | | 4,897 | 100.00% |

Republican primary results
| Party | Candidate | Votes | % |
|---|---|---|---|
| Republican | Trudy Camping (incumbent) | 4,503 | 100.00% |
| Total votes | | 4,503 | 100.00% |

General election results
| Party | Candidate | Votes | % |
|---|---|---|---|
| Republican | Trudy Camping (incumbent) | 10,639 | 53.37% |
| Democratic | Betty Morrison | 9,294 | 46.63% |
| Total votes | | 19,933 | 100.00% |
| Republican hold | | | |

=== District 26 ===
Democratic primary results
| Party | Candidate | Votes | % |
|---|---|---|---|
| Democratic | Art McBrayer | 3,442 | 100.00% |
| Total votes | | 3,442 | 100.00% |

Republican primary results
| Party | Candidate | Votes | % |
|---|---|---|---|
| Republican | John Roeder | 2,709 | 34.30% |
| Republican | Kelsey Moline | 1,601 | 20.27% |
| Republican | Jay Ryan | 1,293 | 16.37% |
| Republican | John L. Holmes | 1,264 | 16.00% |
| Republican | J. Rex Hubbard | 1,032 | 13.06% |
| Total votes | | 7,899 | 100.00% |

General election results
| Party | Candidate | Votes | % |
|---|---|---|---|
| Republican | John Roeder | 15,692 | 66.29% |
| Democratic | Art McBrayer | 7,979 | 33.71% |
| Total votes | | 23,671 | 100.00% |
| Republican hold | | | |

=== District 27 ===
Democratic primary results
| Party | Candidate | Votes | % |
|---|---|---|---|
| Democratic | Richard S. (Dick) Berry | 2,525 | 64.69% |
| Democratic | Miss Janet Patten Heath | 1,378 | 35.31% |
| Total votes | | 3,903 | 100.00% |

Republican primary results
| Party | Candidate | Votes | % |
|---|---|---|---|
| Republican | James A. (Jim) Mack (incumbent) | 4,710 | 100.00% |
| Total votes | | 4,710 | 100.00% |

General election results
| Party | Candidate | Votes | % |
|---|---|---|---|
| Republican | James A. (Jim) Mack (incumbent) | 14,613 | 58.26% |
| Democratic | Richard S. (Dick) Berry | 10,469 | 41.74% |
| Total votes | | 25,082 | 100.00% |
| Republican gain from Democratic | | | |

=== District 28 ===
Republican primary results
| Party | Candidate | Votes | % |
|---|---|---|---|
| Republican | David B. Kret (incumbent) | 5,926 | 81.60% |
| Republican | B. S. (Berf) Oakley Jr. | 1,336 | 18.40% |
| Total votes | | 7,262 | 100.00% |

General election results
| Party | Candidate | Votes | % |
|---|---|---|---|
| Republican | David B. Kret (incumbent) | 19,891 | 100.00% |
| Total votes | | 19,891 | 100.00% |
| Republican gain from Democratic | | | |

=== District 29 ===
Republican primary results
| Party | Candidate | Votes | % |
|---|---|---|---|
| Republican | D. Delos Ellsworth (incumbent) | 5,567 | 100.00% |
| Total votes | | 5,567 | 100.00% |

General election results
| Party | Candidate | Votes | % |
|---|---|---|---|
| Republican | D. Delos Ellsworth (incumbent) | 15,253 | 100.00% |
| Total votes | | 15,253 | 100.00% |
| Republican hold | | | |

=== District 30 ===
Democratic primary results
| Party | Candidate | Votes | % |
|---|---|---|---|
| Democratic | Clifford L. Searcy | 2,807 | 100.00% |
| Total votes | | 2,807 | 100.00% |

Republican primary results
| Party | Candidate | Votes | % |
|---|---|---|---|
| Republican | Stan Turley | 3,996 | 70.89% |
| Republican | Evelyn L. Parent | 1,641 | 29.11% |
| Total votes | | 5,637 | 100.00% |

General election results
| Party | Candidate | Votes | % |
|---|---|---|---|
| Republican | Stan Turley | 13,266 | 69.94% |
| Democratic | Clifford L. Searcy | 5,701 | 30.06% |
| Total votes | | 18,967 | 100.00% |
| Republican hold | | | |
