= 33rd Arizona State Legislature =

Session of the Arizona Legislature

| ← | 32nd | 34th | → |
- Arizona State Capitol (2014)

Overview
- Legislative body: Arizona State Legislature
- Jurisdiction: Arizona, United States
- Term: January 1, 1977 – December 31, 1978

Senate
- Members: 30
- Party control: Democrat (16–14)

House of Representatives
- Members: 60
- Party control: Republican (38–22)

Sessions
- 1st: January 10 – May 27–28, 1977
- 2nd: January 9 – June 4, 1978

Special sessions
- 1st: June 29 – June 29, 1978
- 2nd: October 19 – October 19, 1978

The 33rd Arizona State Legislature, consisting of the Arizona State Senate and the Arizona House of Representatives, was constituted in Phoenix from January 1, 1977, to December 31, 1978. The legislature met during the terms of three Arizona Governors. When it was constituted, Raúl Héctor Castro still had two years remaining on his only term in office as Governor of Arizona. When Castro left the office to become Ambassador to Argentina in October 1977, he was succeeded by Wesley Bolin, Arizona's Secretary of State. Arizona's constitution mandates that the Secretary of State is first in line of succession to the office of Governor. However, Bolin died in office five months later, on March 4, 1978, and was succeeded by Bruce Babbitt, who was then the Attorney General. Bolin was not succeeded by his replacement, Rose Mofford, because she had been appointed, not elected to the office. Succession fell to the next in line, Babbitt. Both the Senate and the House membership remained constant at 30 and 60, respectively. The republicans made inroads into the Democrat lead in the Senate, picking up two seats, although the Democrats maintained a 16–14 edge in the upper house. In the lower chamber, the republicans increased their majority by 5 seats, giving them a 38–22 margin.

== Sessions ==
The Legislature met for two regular sessions at the state Capitol in Phoenix. The first opened on January 10, 1977, and the two houses adjourned separately. The Senate adjourned on May 27, 1977, at 11:59 pm, while the House adjourned two minutes later, at 12:01 am on May 28. The Second Regular Session convened on January 9, 1978, and adjourned sine die on June 4.

There were two special sessions. The first convened on June 29, 1978, and adjourned sine die later that same day, while the second convened on October 19, 1978, and also adjourned later that same day.

== State Senate ==
=== Members ===
The asterisk (*) denotes members of the previous Legislature who continued in office as members of this Legislature.

| District | Senator | Party | Notes |
|---|---|---|---|
| 1 | Boyd Tenney* | Republican | |
| 2 | Lewis J. McDonald | Democrat | |
| 3 | Arthur J. Hubbard Sr.* | Democrat | |
| 4 | A. V. "Bill" Hardt* | Democrat | |
| 5 | Jones Osborn* | Democrat | |
| 6 | Polly Getzwiller | Democrat | |
| 7 | William L. Swink* | Democrat | |
| 8 | Ed Sawyer* | Democrat | |
| 9 | John J. Hutton | Democrat | |
| 10 | Tom Moore* | Democrat | |
| 11 | Frank J. Felix* | Democrat | |
| 12 | Sue Dye* | Democrat | |
| 13 | Morris Farr* | Democrat | |
| 14 | Jim Kolbe | Republican | |
| 15 | S. H. Runyan* | Republican | |
| 16 | Marcia Weeks* | Democrat | |
| 17 | Anne Lindeman | Republican | |
| 18 | Leo Corbet* | Republican | |
| 19 | Ray Rottas | Republican | |
| 20 | Lela Alston | Democrat | |
| 21 | Timothy D. Hayes | Republican | |
| 22 | Manuel "Lito" Pena* | Democrat | |
| 23 | Alfredo Gutierrez* | Democrat | |
| 24 | John C. Pritzlaff Jr. | Republican | |
| 25 | Trudy Camping | Republican | |
| 26 | Rod J. McMullin | Republican | |
| 27 | James A. Mack* | Republican | |
| 28 | Robert B. Usdane | Republican | |
| 29 | Jack J. Taylor* | Republican | |
| 30 | Stan Turley* | Republican | |

== House of Representatives ==
=== Members ===
The asterisk (*) denotes members of the previous Legislature who continued in office as members of this Legislature.

| District | Representative | Party | Notes |
|---|---|---|---|
| 1 | John U. Hays* | Republican | |
| 1 | James A. Woodward | Republican | |
| 2 | Sam A. McConnell Jr.* | Republican | |
| 2 | John Wettaw* | Republican | |
| 3 | Benjamin Hanley* | Democrat | |
| 3 | Daniel Peaches* | Republican | |
| 4 | Edward G. Guerrero* | Democrat | |
| 4 | E. C. "Polly" Rosenbaum* | Democrat | |
| 5 | Elwood W. Bradford* | Democrat | |
| 5 | Jim Phillips* | Democrat | |
| 6 | James Hartdegen | Republican | |
| 6 | Manuel G. Marin | Democrat | |
| 7 | Richard Pacheco* | Democrat | |
| 7 | Peter VillaVerde Jr. | Democrat | |
| 8 | James A. Elliott* | Democrat | |
| 8 | Steve Vukcevich* | Democrat | |
| 9 | William J. English | Republican | |
| 9 | John R. Humphreys Jr. | Democrat | |
| 10 | Larry Bahill* | Democrat | |
| 10 | Carmen Cajero* | Democrat | |
| 11 | Emilio Carrillo* | Democrat | |
| 11 | Peter Goudinoff | Democrat | |
| 12 | Thomas N. Goodwin* | Republican | |
| 12 | John Kromko | Democrat | |
| 13 | Clare Dunn* | Democrat | |
| 13 | Larry Hawke | Republican | |
| 14 | Arnold Jeffers | Republican | |
| 14 | Emmett McLoughlin | Republican | |
| 15 | J. Herbert Everett* | Republican | |
| 15 | James B. Ratliff* | Republican | |
| 16 | Diane B. McCarthy* | Republican | |
| 16 | Don Stewart* | Republican | |
| 17 | C. W. "Bill" Lewis* | Republican | |
| 17 | Patrica D. Wright | Republican | |
| 18 | Burton S. Barr* | Republican | |
| 18 | Pete Dunn | Republican | |
| 19 | Stan Akers* | Republican | |
| 19 | W. A. "Tony" West Jr.* | Republican | |
| 20 | Lillian Jordan | Republican | |
| 20 | Gerald F. Moore* | Democrat | |
| 21 | Donald Kenney | Republican | |
| 21 | Elizabeth Adams Rockwell* | Republican | |
| 22 | Art Hamilton* | Democrat | |
| 22 | Earl V. Wilcox | Democrat | |
| 23 | Tony R. Abril* | Democrat | |
| 23 | Leon Thompson* | Democrat | |
| 24 | Pete Corpstein* | Republican | |
| 24 | Cal Holman* | Republican | |
| 25 | D. Lee Jones* | Republican | |
| 25 | Jacque Steiner | Republican | |
| 26 | Peter Kay* | Republican | |
| 26 | Frank Kelley* | Republican | |
| 27 | Dick Flynn* | Republican | |
| 27 | Juanita Harelson* | Republican | |
| 28 | William E. Rigel* | Republican | |
| 28 | Jim Skelly** | Republican | |
| 29 | Donna J. Carlson* | Republican | |
| 29 | Jim L. Cooper* | Republican | |
| 30 | Carl J. Kunasek* | Republican | |
| 30 | James J. Sossaman* | Republican | |

The ** denotes that Skelly was a member of the prior legislature, but from district 25.
