= 1984 Arizona Senate election =

- November 6, 1984

All 30 seats of the Arizona Senate 16 seats needed for a majority
	Majority party	Minority party
Leader	Stan Turley	Alfredo Gutierrez
Party	Republican	Democratic
Leader's seat	30th	23rd
Seats before	18	12
Seats after	18	12
Seat change	Steady	Steady
Senate President before election
Stan Turley
Republican
Elected Senate President
Stan Turley
Republican

The 1984 Arizona Senate election was held on November 6, 1984. Voters elected members of the Arizona Senate in all 30 of the state's legislative districts to serve a two-year term. Primary elections were held on September 11, 1984.

Prior to the elections, the Republicans held a majority of 18 seats over the Democrats' 12 seats.

Following the election, Republicans maintained control of the chamber and their majority of 18 Republicans to 12 Democrats remained unchanged.

The newly elected senators served in the 37th Arizona State Legislature.

== Incumbents Defeated in Primary Elections ==
=== Democrat ===
1. District 6: Polly Getzwiller

== Incumbents Defeated in General Elections ==
=== Democrat ===
1. District 3: Arthur J. Hubbard Sr. (Note: Senator Hubbard ran as an Independent in the general election and came in third.)

== Summary of Results by Arizona State Legislative District ==
District	Incumbent	Party	Elected Senator	Outcome
1st	John U. Hays	Rep	John U. Hays	Rep Hold
2nd	Tony Gabaldon	Dem	Tony Gabaldon	Dem Hold
3rd	Arthur J. Hubbard Sr.	Dem	James Henderson Jr.	Dem Hold
4th	A.V. "Bill" Hardt	Dem	A.V. "Bill" Hardt	Dem Hold
5th	Jones Osborn	Dem	Jones Osborn	Dem Hold
6th	Polly Getzwiller	Dem	Alan J. Stephens	Dem Hold
7th	Peter Rios	Dem	Peter Rios	Dem Hold
8th	Ed C. Sawyer	Dem	Ed C. Sawyer	Dem Hold
9th	Jeffrey J. Hill	Rep	Jeffrey J. Hill	Rep Hold
10th	Luis Armando Gonzales	Dem	Luis Armando Gonzales	Dem Hold
11th	Jaime P. Gutierrez	Dem	Jaime P. Gutierrez	Dem Hold
12th	John T. Mawhinney	Rep	John T. Mawhinney	Rep Hold
13th	Greg Lunn	Rep	Greg Lunn	Rep Hold
14th	William J. "Bill" DeLong	Rep	William J. "Bill" DeLong	Rep Hold
15th	S.H. "Hal" Runyan	Rep	S.H. "Hal" Runyan	Rep Hold
16th	Wayne Stump	Rep	Wayne Stump	Rep Hold
17th	Anne Lindeman	Rep	Anne Lindeman	Rep Hold
18th	Tony West	Rep	Tony West	Rep Hold
19th	Bill Davis	Rep	Bill Davis	Rep Hold
20th	Lela Alston	Dem	Lela Alston	Dem Hold
21st	Carl J. Kunasek	Rep	Carl J. Kunasek	Rep Hold
22nd	Manuel "Lito" Peña Jr.	Dem	Manuel "Lito" Peña Jr.	Dem Hold
23rd	Alfredo Gutierrez	Dem	Alfredo Gutierrez	Dem Hold
24th	Pete Corpstein	Rep	Pete Corpstein	Rep Hold
25th	Jacque Steiner	Rep	Jacque Steiner	Rep Hold
26th	Peter Kay	Rep	Peter Kay	Rep Hold
27th	Juanita Harelson	Rep	Juanita Harelson	Rep Hold
28th	Robert B. Usdane	Rep	Robert B. Usdane	Rep Hold
29th	Jack J. Taylor	Rep	Jack J. Taylor	Rep Hold
30th	Stan Turley	Rep	Stan Turley	Rep Hold

== Detailed Results ==
=== District 1 ===
Republican primary results
Party	Candidate	Votes	%
Republican	John U. Hays (incumbent)	10,865	100.00%
Total votes		10,865	100.00%

General election results
Party	Candidate	Votes	%
Republican	John U. Hays (incumbent)	24,344	100.00%
Total votes		24,344	100.00%
Republican hold			

=== District 2 ===
Democratic primary results
Party	Candidate	Votes	%
Democratic	Tony Gabaldon (incumbent)	7,647	100.00%
Total votes		7,647	100.00%

Republican primary results
Party	Candidate	Votes	%
Republican	John G. Orr	6,979	100.00%
Total votes		6,979	100.00%

General election results
Party	Candidate	Votes	%
Democratic	Tony Gabaldon (incumbent)	21,664	53.47%
Republican	John G. Orr	18,855	46.53%
Total votes		40,519	100.00%
Democratic hold			

=== District 3 ===
Democratic primary results
Party	Candidate	Votes	%
Democratic	James Henderson Jr.	4,381	52.09%
Democratic	Freddie Howard	4,030	47.91%
Total votes		8,411	100.00%

Republican primary results
Party	Candidate	Votes	%
Republican	Fred Burke (Note: Ran as a write-in candidate in the primary election.)	104	53.06%
Republican	Faron Morgan	92	46.94%
Total votes		196	100.00%

General election results
Party	Candidate	Votes	%
Democratic	James Henderson Jr.	11,655	54.17%
Republican	Fred Burke	5,948	27.64%
Independent	Arthur J. Hubbard, Sr. (incumbent)	3,913	18.19%
Total votes		21,516	100.00%
Democratic hold			

=== District 4 ===
Democratic primary results
Party	Candidate	Votes	%
Democratic	A. V. "Bill" Hardt (incumbent)	9,945	64.45%
Democratic	Les E. Hunt	5,485	35.55%
Total votes		15,430	100.00%

General election results
Party	Candidate	Votes	%
Democratic	A. V. "Bill" Hardt (incumbent)	23,123	100.00%
Total votes		23,123	100.00%
Democratic hold			

=== District 5 ===
Democratic primary results
Party	Candidate	Votes	%
Democratic	Jones Osborn (incumbent)	7,893	100.00%
Total votes		7,893	100.00%

General election results
Party	Candidate	Votes	%
Democratic	Jones Osborn (incumbent)	17,586	97.82%
Republican	Dean W. Newton (Note: Ran as a write-in candidate in the general election.)	392	2.18%
Total votes		17,978	100.00%
Democratic hold			

=== District 6 ===
Democratic primary results
Party	Candidate	Votes	%
Democratic	Alan J. Stephens	4,071	56.06%
Democratic	Polly Getzwiller (incumbent)	3,191	43.94%
Total votes		7,262	100.00%

Republican primary results
Party	Candidate	Votes	%
Republican	Hugh N. Guinn	2,317	100.00%
Total votes		2,317	100.00%

General election results
Party	Candidate	Votes	%
Democratic	Alan J. Stephens	12,667	51.43%
Republican	Hugh N. Guinn	11,964	48.57%
Total votes		24,631	100.00%
Democratic hold			

=== District 7 ===
Democratic primary results
Party	Candidate	Votes	%
Democratic	Peter Rios (incumbent)	7,044	58.80%
Democratic	Bill Swink	4,936	41.20%
Total votes		11,980	100.00%

Republican primary results
Party	Candidate	Votes	%
Republican	Jim Mumme	191	100.00%
Total votes		191	100.00%

General election results
Party	Candidate	Votes	%
Democratic	Peter Rios (incumbent)	18,194	64.33%
Republican	Jim Mumme	10,087	35.67%
Total votes		28,281	100.00%
Democratic hold			

=== District 8 ===
Democratic primary results
Party	Candidate	Votes	%
Democratic	Ed C. Sawyer (incumbent)	10,995	81.73%
Democratic	James "Tarzan Jaime" Hannan	2,458	18.27%
Total votes		13,453	100.00%

General election results
Party	Candidate	Votes	%
Democratic	Ed C. Sawyer (incumbent)	16,471	100.00%
Total votes		16,471	100.00%
Democratic hold			

=== District 9 ===
Democratic primary results
Party	Candidate	Votes	%
Democratic	James Baker	6,745	100.00%
Total votes		6,745	100.00%

Republican primary results
Party	Candidate	Votes	%
Republican	Jeffrey J. Hill (incumbent)	7,303	100.00%
Total votes		7,303	100.00%

General election results
Party	Candidate	Votes	%
Republican	Jeffrey J. Hill (incumbent)	19,506	52.38%
Democratic	James Baker	17,732	47.62%
Total votes		37,238	100.00%
Republican hold			

=== District 10 ===
Democratic primary results
Party	Candidate	Votes	%
Democratic	Luis Armando Gonzales (incumbent)	4,586	100.00%
Total votes		4,586	100.00%

Republican primary results
Party	Candidate	Votes	%
Republican	Dwayne S. Register	1,075	100.00%
Total votes		1,075	100.00%

General election results
Party	Candidate	Votes	%
Democratic	Luis Armando Gonzales (incumbent)	13,099	68.62%
Republican	Dwayne S. Register	5,989	31.38%
Total votes		19,088	100.00%
Democratic hold			

=== District 11 ===
Democratic primary results
Party	Candidate	Votes	%
Democratic	Jaime P. Gutierrez (incumbent)	6,939	100.00%
Total votes		6,939	100.00%

General election results
Party	Candidate	Votes	%
Democratic	Jaime P. Gutierrez (incumbent)	24,134	100.00%
Total votes		24,134	100.00%
Democratic hold			

=== District 12 ===
Democratic primary results
Party	Candidate	Votes	%
Democratic	William E. Minette	6,418	100.00%
Total votes		6,418	100.00%

Republican primary results
Party	Candidate	Votes	%
Republican	John T. Mawhinney (incumbent)	7,079	100.00%
Total votes		7,079	100.00%

General election results
Party	Candidate	Votes	%
Republican	John T. Mawhinney (incumbent)	26,885	63.42%
Democratic	William E. Minette	15,506	36.58%
Total votes		42,391	100.00%
Republican hold			

=== District 13 ===
Democratic primary results
Party	Candidate	Votes	%
Democratic	John W. Biggers	5,364	100.00%
Total votes		5,364	100.00%

Republican primary results
Party	Candidate	Votes	%
Republican	Greg Lunn (incumbent)	8,051	100.00%
Total votes		8,051	100.00%

General election results
Party	Candidate	Votes	%
Republican	Greg Lunn (incumbent)	28,744	66.77%
Democratic	John W. Biggers	14,306	33.23%
Total votes		43,050	100.00%
Republican hold			

=== District 14 ===
Democratic primary results
Party	Candidate	Votes	%
Democratic	Georgia Cole Brousseau	4,900	100.00%
Total votes		4,900	100.00%

Republican primary results
Party	Candidate	Votes	%
Republican	William J. "Bill" DeLong (incumbent)	6,355	100.00%
Total votes		6,355	100.00%

General election results
Party	Candidate	Votes	%
Republican	William J. "Bill" DeLong (incumbent)	22,564	59.26%
Democratic	Georgia Cole Brousseau	15,510	40.74%
Total votes		38,074	100.00%
Republican hold			

=== District 15 ===
Republican primary results
Party	Candidate	Votes	%
Republican	S. H. "Hal" Runyan (incumbent)	5,056	100.00%
Total votes		5,056	100.00%

General election results
Party	Candidate	Votes	%
Republican	S. H. "Hal" Runyan (incumbent)	26,676	100.00%
Total votes		26,676	100.00%
Republican hold			

=== District 16 ===
Democratic primary results
Party	Candidate	Votes	%
Democratic	Mat Wheeler	2,179	100.00%
Total votes		2,179	100.00%

Republican primary results
Party	Candidate	Votes	%
Republican	Wayne Stump (incumbent)	3,315	100.00%
Total votes		3,315	100.00%

General election results
Party	Candidate	Votes	%
Republican	Wayne Stump (incumbent)	21,159	64.09%
Democratic	Mat Wheeler	11,853	35.91%
Total votes		33,012	100.00%
Republican hold			

=== District 17 ===
Republican primary results
Party	Candidate	Votes	%
Republican	Anne Lindeman (incumbent)	5,957	100.00%
Total votes		5,957	100.00%

General election results
Party	Candidate	Votes	%
Republican	Anne Lindeman (incumbent)	27,798	100.00%
Total votes		27,798	100.00%
Republican hold			

=== District 18 ===
Republican primary results
Party	Candidate	Votes	%
Republican	Tony West (incumbent)	4,487	100.00%
Total votes		4,487	100.00%

General election results
Party	Candidate	Votes	%
Republican	Tony West (incumbent)	27,190	100.00%
Total votes		27,190	100.00%
Republican hold			

=== District 19 ===
Democratic primary results
Party	Candidate	Votes	%
Democratic	Lorraine King	2,227	100.00%
Total votes		2,227	100.00%

Republican primary results
Party	Candidate	Votes	%
Republican	Bill Davis (incumbent)	4,730	100.00%
Total votes		4,730	100.00%

General election results
Party	Candidate	Votes	%
Republican	Bill Davis (incumbent)	26,209	66.82%
Democratic	Lorraine King	13,017	33.18%
Total votes		39,226	100.00%
Republican hold			

=== District 20 ===
Democratic primary results
Party	Candidate	Votes	%
Democratic	Lela Alston (incumbent)	2,978	100.00%
Total votes		2,978	100.00%

Republican primary results
Party	Candidate	Votes	%
Republican	Georgia Hargan	298	100.00%
Total votes		298	100.00%

General election results
Party	Candidate	Votes	%
Democratic	Lela Alston (incumbent)	14,223	52.93%
Republican	Georgia Hargan	11,677	43.46%
Independent	Dick Singer	969	3.61%
Total votes		26,869	100.00%
Democratic hold			

=== District 21 ===
Democratic primary results
Party	Candidate	Votes	%
Democratic	Dominic "Nick" Colletto Jr.	2,129	100.00%
Total votes		2,129	100.00%

Republican primary results
Party	Candidate	Votes	%
Republican	Carl J. Kunasek (incumbent)	4,620	100.00%
Total votes		4,620	100.00%

General election results
Party	Candidate	Votes	%
Republican	Carl J. Kunasek (incumbent)	22,228	68.69%
Democratic	Dominic "Nick" Colletto Jr.	10,130	31.31%
Total votes		32,358	100.00%
Republican hold			

=== District 22 ===
Democratic primary results
Party	Candidate	Votes	%
Democratic	Manuel "Lito" Peña Jr. (incumbent)	2,389	100.00%
Total votes		2,389	100.00%

Republican primary results
Party	Candidate	Votes	%
Republican	Caroline Coronado	775	100.00%
Total votes		775	100.00%

General election results
Party	Candidate	Votes	%
Democratic	Manuel "Lito" Peña Jr. (incumbent)	8,684	58.18%
Republican	Caroline Coronado	6,241	41.81%
Independent	Bob Best (Note: No party designation indicated.)	1	0.01%
Total votes		14,926	100.00%
Democratic hold			

=== District 23 ===
Democratic primary results
Party	Candidate	Votes	%
Democratic	Alfredo Gutierrez (incumbent)	3,222	100.00%
Total votes		3,222	100.00%

General election results
Party	Candidate	Votes	%
Democratic	Alfredo Gutierrez (incumbent)	12,395	100.00%
Total votes		12,395	100.00%
Democratic hold			

=== District 24 ===
Republican primary results
Party	Candidate	Votes	%
Republican	Pete Corpstein (incumbent)	6,014	100.00%
Total votes		6,014	100.00%

General election results
Party	Candidate	Votes	%
Republican	Pete Corpstein (incumbent)	31,954	100.00%
Total votes		31,954	100.00%
Republican hold			

=== District 25 ===
Democratic primary results
Party	Candidate	Votes	%
Democratic	John Williams	154	100.00%
Total votes		154	100.00%

Republican primary results
Party	Candidate	Votes	%
Republican	Jacque Steiner (incumbent)	5,010	100.00%
Total votes		5,010	100.00%

General election results
Party	Candidate	Votes	%
Republican	Jacque Steiner (incumbent)	20,868	72.51%
Against Tax Abuse (Note: Switched from the Democratic Party in the primary election to "Against Tax Abuse" party designation in the general election.)	John Williams	7,911	27.49%
Total votes		28,779	100.00%
Republican hold			

=== District 26 ===
Democratic primary results
Party	Candidate	Votes	%
Democratic	George Hetrick	2,445	100.00%
Total votes		2,445	100.00%

Republican primary results
Party	Candidate	Votes	%
Republican	Peter Kay (incumbent)	4,718	100.00%
Total votes		4,718	100.00%

General election results
Party	Candidate	Votes	%
Republican	Peter Kay (incumbent)	23,786	68.59%
Democratic	George Hetrick	10,895	31.41%
Total votes		34,681	100.00%
Republican hold			

=== District 27 ===
Democratic primary results
Party	Candidate	Votes	%
Democratic	Carolyn Maxon	2,640	100.00%
Total votes		2,640	100.00%

Republican primary results
Party	Candidate	Votes	%
Republican	Juanita Harelson (incumbent)	3,525	63.33%
Republican	Vic Heller	2,041	36.67%
Total votes		5,566	100.00%

General election results
Party	Candidate	Votes	%
Republican	Juanita Harelson (incumbent)	24,563	65.69%
Democratic	Carolyn Maxon	12,830	34.31%
Total votes		37,393	100.00%
Republican hold			

=== District 28 ===
Republican primary results
Party	Candidate	Votes	%
Republican	Robert B. Usdane (incumbent)	4,715	100.00%
Total votes		4,715	100.00%

General election results
Party	Candidate	Votes	%
Republican	Robert B. Usdane (incumbent)	36,659	100.00%
Total votes		36,659	100.00%
Republican hold			

=== District 29 ===
Republican primary results
Party	Candidate	Votes	%
Republican	Jack J. Taylor (incumbent)	4,363	100.00%
Total votes		4,363	100.00%

General election results
Party	Candidate	Votes	%
Republican	Jack J. Taylor (incumbent)	24,974	100.00%
Total votes		24,974	100.00%
Republican hold			

=== District 30 ===
Republican primary results
Party	Candidate	Votes	%
Republican	Stan Turley (incumbent)	4,691	100.00%
Total votes		4,691	100.00%

General election results
Party	Candidate	Votes	%
Republican	Stan Turley (incumbent)	34,511	100.00%
Total votes		34,511	100.00%
Republican hold			
