= Sue Dye =

American politician

Sue Dye is a former teacher and state legislator in Arizona. She served in the Arizona Senate as a Majority Whip. She served in the Arizona Senate from 1975 to 1978.

She taught journalism in high school in Tucson for ten years.

== See also ==
- 1974 Arizona Senate election
- 1976 Arizona Senate election
- 32nd Arizona State Legislature
- 33rd Arizona State Legislature
