= 1970 Arizona House of Representatives election =

1970 Arizona House of Representatives elections
- November 3, 1970

All 60 seats in the Arizona House 31 seats needed for a majority
	Majority party	Minority party
Party	Republican	Democratic
Last election	34	26
Seats after	34	26
Seat change	Steady	Steady
Speaker before election
John H. Haugh
Republican
Elected Speaker
Timothy A. Barrow
Republican

The 1970 Arizona House of Representatives elections were held on November 3, 1970. Voters elected all 60 members of the Arizona House of Representatives in multi-member districts to serve a two-year term. The elections coincided with the elections for other offices, including Governor, U.S. Senate, U.S. House, and State Senate. The 1970 election ushered in the restructuring of the Arizona Legislature to its current format. There are now 30 electoral districts across the state, each district electing a single state senator and two state representatives.

Primary elections were held on September 8, 1970.

Prior to the elections, the Republicans held a majority of 34 seats over the Democrats' 26 seats.

Following the elections, Republicans maintained control of the chamber and their majority with 34 Republicans to 26 Democrats remained unchanged.

The newly elected members served in the 30th Arizona State Legislature, during which Republican Timothy A. Barrow was chosen as Speaker of the Arizona House. (Note: Barrow was elected as Speaker for the 30th legislature, defeating Representative Brown, who was also nominated for Speaker. The vote tally for Speaker was: Barrow-34 votes to Brown-26 votes.)

== Summary of Results by Arizona State Legislative District ==
Old District	Incumbent	Party	New District	Elected Representative	Outcome
1st	Gladys Gardner	Rep	1st	Gladys Gardner	Rep Hold
1st	Ray Everett	Rep	1st	Ray Everett	Rep Hold
2nd	W. L. "Tay" Cook (Note: Redistricted from district 2 to 8.)	Dem	2nd	Sam A. McConnell Jr. (Note: Redistricted from district 4 to 2.)	Rep Gain
2nd	Ed Sawyer (Note: Redistricted from district 2 to 8.)	Dem	2nd	Harold L. Huffer (Note: Redistricted from district 4 to 2.)	Dem Hold
2nd	H.F. (Hank) Fenn (Note: Redistricted from district 2 to 8.)	Dem	Obsolete sub-districts		
2nd	Richard "Dick" Pacheco (Note: Redistricted from district 2 to 9.)	Dem	Obsolete sub-districts		
3rd	Boyd A. Shumway	Dem	3rd	Boyd A. Shumway	Dem Hold
3rd	G. O. "Sonny" Biles (Note: Redistricted from district 3 to 4.)	Dem	3rd	Glen L. Flake	Dem Hold
3rd	Jack A. Brown (Note: Redistricted from district 3 to 4.)	Dem	Obsolete sub-districts		
3rd	Lynn Tanner	Dem	Obsolete sub-districts		
4th	Harold L. Huffer	Dem	4th	Jack A. Brown	Dem Hold
4th	Sam A. McConnell Jr.	Rep	4th	G. O. "Sonny" Biles	Dem Gain
5th	Polly Getzwiller (Note: Redistricted from district 5 to 6.)	Dem	5th	Elwood W. (Brad) Bradford	Dem Hold
5th	E. C. "Polly" Rosenbaum (Note: Redistricted from district 5 to 7.)	Dem	5th	Jones Osborn	Dem Hold
5th	Fred S. Smith	Dem	Obsolete sub-districts		
5th	Craig E. Davids (Note: Redistricted from district 5 to 6.)	Dem	Obsolete sub-districts		
6th	Charles A. (Charlie) Johnson (Note: Redistricted from district 6 to 5.)	Dem	6th	Polly Getzwiller	Dem Hold
6th	M. G. "Pop" Miniken (Note: Redistricted from district 6 to 5.)	Dem	6th	Craig E. Davids	Dem Hold
7-A	E. S. "Bud" Walker (Note: Redistricted from district 7-A to 10.)	Dem	7th	E. C. "Polly" Rosenbaum	Dem Hold
7-A	Bernardo M. "Nayo" Cajero (Note: Redistricted from district 7-A to 10.)	Dem	7th	Edward G. (Bunch) Guerrero	Dem Hold
7-B	Etta Mae Hutcheson (Note: Redistricted from district 7-B to 11.)	Dem	8th	Hank Fenn	Dem Hold
7-B	Ethel Maynard (Note: Redistricted from district 7-B to 11.)	Dem	8th	Ed Sawyer	Dem Hold
7-C	R. P. "Bob" Fricks (Note: Redistricted from district 7-C to 12.)	Dem	9th	William R. (Bill) Ryan	Dem Hold
7-C	J. H. "Jim" Dewberry Jr. (Note: Redistricted from district 7-C to 12.)	Dem	9th	Richard "Dick" Pacheco	Dem Hold
7-D	Thomas N. (Tom) Goodwin (Note: Redistricted from district 7-D to 13.)	Rep	10th	E. S. "Bud" Walker	Dem Gain
7-D	John H. Haugh	Rep	10th	Bernardo M. "Nayo" Cajero	Dem Gain
7-E	David B. Stone (Note: Redistricted from district 7-E to 14.)	Rep	11th	Etta Mae Hutcheson	Dem Gain
7-E	Albert C. Williams (Note: Redistricted from district 7-E to 14.)	Rep	11th	Ethel Maynard	Dem Gain
7-F	Scott Alexander	Rep	12th	R. P. "Bob" Fricks	Dem Gain
7-F	W. A. "Tony" Buehl (Note: Redistricted from district 7-F to 15.)	Rep	12th	J. H. (Jim) Dewberry Jr.	Dem Gain
8-A	Walter E. Bloom	Rep	13th	Thomas N. (Tom) Goodwin	Rep Hold
8-A	James J. Sossaman (Note: Redistricted from district 8-A to 29.)	Rep	13th	H. Thomas (Tam) Kincaid	Rep Hold
8-B	Stan Turley (Note: Redistricted from district 8-B to 30.)	Rep	14th	David B. Stone	Rep Hold
8-B	Jim L. Cooper (Note: Redistricted from district 8-B to 30.)	Rep	14th	Helen Grace Carlson	Dem Gain
8-C	Sam Flake (Note: Redistricted from district 8-C to 21.)	Rep	15th	W. A. "Tony" Buehl	Rep Hold
8-C	Peter Kay (Note: Republican Peter Kay was appointed on January 5, 1970 to fill the vacancy created by the resignation of Republican Representative John C. Pritzlaff Jr., District 8-C, Maricopa County, Arizona.) (Note: Redistricted from district 8-C to 21.)	Rep	15th	Charles W. King	Rep Hold
8-D	Frank Kelley (Note: Redistricted from district 8-D to 26.)	Rep	16th	C. W. "Bill" Lewis (Note: Redistricted from district 8-O to 16.)	Rep Hold
8-D	James "Jim" Shelley (Note: Redistricted from district 8-D to 26.)	Rep	16th	Hal Runyan	Rep Hold
8-E	Ruth Adams (Note: Redistricted from district 8-E to 20.)	Rep	17th	Stuart Schoenburg (Note: Republican W. Vincent Thelander, Sr. was appointed on January 18, 1971 to fill the vacancy created by the resignation of Republican Representative Stuart Schoenburg, District 17, Maricopa County, Arizona.) (Note: Redistricted from district 8-K to 17.)	Rep Hold
8-E	John D. Roeder	Rep	17th	James B. Ratliff	Rep Hold
8-F	D. Lee Jones (Note: Redistricted from district 8-F to 25.)	Rep	18th	Don Stewart (Note: Redistricted from district 8-L to 18.)	Rep Hold
8-F	Renz D. Jennings	Dem	18th	Bob Strother	Rep Gain
8-G	Leon Thompson (Note: Redistricted from district 8-G to 28.)	Dem	19th	Timothy A. Barrow (Note: Redistricted from district 8-J to 19.)	Rep Gain
8-G	Tony Abril	Dem	19th	Stan Akers (Note: Redistricted from district 8-J to 19.)	Rep Gain
8-H	Elizabeth Adams Rockwell (Note: Redistricted from district 8-H to 24.)	Rep	20th	Ruth Adams	Rep Hold
8-H	Jay C. Stuckey (Note: Redistricted from district 8-H to 24.)	Rep	20th	Richard Burgess	Rep Hold
8-I	Burton Barr (Note: Redistricted from district 8-I to 23.)	Rep	21st	Peter Kay	Rep Hold
8-I	Ruth Peck (Note: Redistricted from district 8-I to 23.)	Rep	21st	Sam Flake	Rep Hold
8-J	Stan Akers	Rep	22nd	Bill McCune	Rep Hold
8-J	Timothy A. Barrow	Rep	22nd	Howard Adams	Rep Hold
8-K	George J. Palé (Note: His name is written as "Pale", "Pale'", and "Palé" on various documents. Nonetheless, it seems the correct spelling of his name is George J. Palé, according to the Arizona State Library.)	Rep	23rd	Burton S. Barr	Rep Hold
8-K	Stuart Schoenburg	Rep	23rd	Ruth Peck	Rep Hold
8-L	Joseph (Joe) Shaughnessy Jr.	Rep	24th	Elizabeth Adams Rockwell	Rep Hold
8-L	Don Stewart	Rep	24th	Jay C. Stuckey, Sr.	Rep Hold
8-M	Bess B. Stinson	Rep	25th	D. Lee Jones	Rep Hold
8-M	Edward C. "Ed" Andrews (Note: Redistricted from district 8-M to 22.)	Rep	25th	Jim Skelly	Rep Hold
8-N	Art Coppinger (Note: Redistricted from district 8-N to 27.)	Dem	26th	Frank Kelley	Rep Gain
8-N	Manuel "Lito" Peña Jr. (Note: Redistricted from district 8-N to 27.)	Dem	26th	Bob Hungerford	Rep Gain
8-O	Fred Koory Jr.	Rep	27th	Manuel "Lito" Peña	Dem Gain
8-O	C. W. "Bill" Lewis	Rep	27th	Art Coppinger	Dem Gain
New Seat			28th	Horace E. Owens	Dem Gain
New Seat			28th	Leon Thompson	Dem Gain
New Seat			29th	Michael Goodwin	Rep Gain
New Seat			29th	James J. Sossaman	Rep Gain
New Seat			30th	Jim Cooper	Rep Gain
New Seat			30th	Stan Turley	Rep Gain

== Detailed Results ==
=== District 1 ===
Primary Election Results
Party	Candidate	Votes	%
Democratic Party Primary Results
Democratic	Irene Mikulewicz	3,721	100.00%
Total votes		3,721	100.00%
Republican Party Primary Results
Republican	Gladys Gardner (incumbent)	3,454	51.45%
Republican	Ray Everett (incumbent)	3,259	48.55%
Total votes		6,713	100.00%

General Election Results
Party	Candidate	Votes	%
Republican	Gladys Gardner (incumbent)	11,368	39.41%
Republican	Ray Everett (incumbent)	10,263	35.58%
Democratic	Irene Mikulewicz	7,217	25.02%
Total votes		28,848	100.00%
Republican hold			
Republican hold			

=== District 2 ===
Primary Election Results
Party	Candidate	Votes	%
Democratic Party Primary Results
Democratic	Harold L. Huffer (incumbent)	1,962	51.66%
Democratic	Phyllis A. Manning	1,836	48.34%
Total votes		3,798	100.00%
Republican Party Primary Results
Republican	Sam A. McConnell Jr. (incumbent)	1,387	55.26%
Republican	Fred Burke	1,123	44.74%
Total votes		2,510	100.00%

General Election Results
Party	Candidate	Votes	%
Republican	Sam A. McConnell Jr. (incumbent)	5,223	31.06%
Democratic	Harold L. Huffer (incumbent)	3,973	23.63%
Democratic	Phyllis A. Manning	3,831	22.78%
Republican	Fred Burke	3,787	22.52%
Total votes		16,814	100.00%
Republican gain from Democratic			
Democratic hold			

=== District 3 ===
Primary Election Results
Party	Candidate	Votes	%
Democratic Party Primary Results
Democratic	Boyd A. Shumway (incumbent)	2,342	34.91%
Democratic	Glen L. Flake	1,893	28.22%
Democratic	Lynn Tanner (incumbent)	1,444	21.52%
Democratic	Wesley Bonito	1,030	15.35%
Total votes		6,709	100.00%
Republican Party Primary Results
Republican	Richard M. (Chip) Culbertson	1,048	100.00%
Total votes		1,048	100.00%

General Election Results
Party	Candidate	Votes	%
Democratic	Boyd A. Shumway (incumbent)	5,021	37.09%
Democratic	Glen L. Flake	4,559	33.67%
Republican	Richard M. (Chip) Culbertson	3,959	29.24%
Total votes		13,539	100.00%
Democratic hold			
Democratic hold			

=== District 4 ===
Primary Election Results
Party	Candidate	Votes	%
Democratic Party Primary Results
Democratic	G. O. "Sonny" Biles (incumbent)	3,251	54.15%
Democratic	Jack A. Brown (incumbent)	2,753	45.85%
Total votes		6,004	100.00%

General Election Results
Party	Candidate	Votes	%
Democratic	Jack A. Brown (incumbent)	5,419	50.18%
Democratic	G. O. "Sonny" Biles (incumbent)	5,380	49.82%
Total votes		10,799	100.00%
Democratic hold			
Democratic gain from Republican			

=== District 5 ===
Primary Election Results
Party	Candidate	Votes	%
Democratic Party Primary Results
Democratic	Jones Osborn	2,582	28.45%
Democratic	Elwood W. (Brad) Bradford	2,240	24.69%
Democratic	M. G. "Pop" Miniken (incumbent)	1,537	16.94%
Democratic	Ruth Foster	1,508	16.62%
Democratic	Charles A. "Charlie" Johnson (incumbent)	1,207	13.30%
Total votes		9,074	100.00%
Republican Party Primary Results
Republican	Gene Taylor	1,287	100.00%
Total votes		1,287	100.00%

General Election Results
Party	Candidate	Votes	%
Democratic	Elwood W. (Brad) Bradford	6,688	38.84%
Democratic	Jones Osborn	6,230	36.18%
Republican	Gene Taylor	4,301	24.98%
Total votes		17,219	100.00%
Democratic hold			
Democratic hold			

=== District 6 ===
Primary Election Results
Party	Candidate	Votes	%
Democratic Party Primary Results
Democratic	Polly Getzwiller (incumbent)	3,050	52.25%
Democratic	Craig E. Davids (incumbent)	2,787	47.75%
Total votes		5,837	100.00%

General Election Results
Party	Candidate	Votes	%
Democratic	Polly Getzwiller (incumbent)	6,121	51.55%
Democratic	Craig E. Davids (incumbent)	5,753	48.45%
Total votes		11,874	100.00%
Democratic hold			
Democratic hold			

=== District 7 ===
Primary Election Results
Party	Candidate	Votes	%
Democratic Party Primary Results
Democratic	E. C. "Polly" Rosenbaum (incumbent)	3,593	23.99%
Democratic	Edward G. (Bunch) Guerrero	2,916	19.47%
Democratic	Don Haines	2,652	17.70%
Democratic	Pascual P. Herrera	2,162	14.43%
Democratic	Louis B. Ellsworth	1,840	12.28%
Democratic	E. Ross Bittner	1,817	12.13%
Total votes		14,980	100.00%

General Election Results
Party	Candidate	Votes	%
Democratic	E. C. "Polly" Rosenbaum (incumbent)	9,435	53.57%
Democratic	Edward G. (Bunch) Guerrero	8,179	46.43%
Total votes		17,614	100.00%
Democratic hold			
Democratic hold			

=== District 8 ===
Primary Election Results
Party	Candidate	Votes	%
Democratic Party Primary Results
Democratic	Hank Fenn (incumbent)	3,921	36.72%
Democratic	Ed C. Sawyer (incumbent)	3,462	32.42%
Democratic	W. L. "Tay" Cook (incumbent)	3,295	30.86%
Total votes		10,678	100.00%
Republican Party Primary Results
Republican	Walter L. (Walt) Foster	1,269	100.00%
Total votes		1,269	100.00%

General Election Results
Party	Candidate	Votes	%
Democratic	Hank Fenn (incumbent)	7,751	40.87%
Democratic	Ed C. Sawyer (incumbent)	7,198	37.96%
Republican	Walter L. (Walt) Foster	4,015	21.17%
Total votes		18,964	100.00%
Democratic hold			
Democratic hold			

=== District 9 ===
Primary Election Results
Party	Candidate	Votes	%
Democratic Party Primary Results
Democratic	William R. (Bill) Ryan	3,400	37.02%
Democratic	Richard "Dick" Pacheco (incumbent)	2,495	27.16%
Democratic	Bob Watkins	1,687	18.37%
Democratic	Howard V. McKinney	1,603	17.45%
Total votes		9,185	100.00%

General Election Results
Party	Candidate	Votes	%
Democratic	William R. (Bill) Ryan	8,282	51.24%
Democratic	Richard "Dick" Pacheco (incumbent)	7,881	48.76%
Total votes		16,163	100.00%
Democratic hold			
Democratic hold			

=== District 10 ===
Primary Election Results
Party	Candidate	Votes	%
Democratic Party Primary Results
Democratic	Bernardo M. "Nayo" Cajero (incumbent)	2,834	29.50%
Democratic	E. S. "Bud" Walker (incumbent)	2,365	24.62%
Democratic	Emilio Carrillo	1,751	18.23%
Democratic	Leo Sullivan	1,305	13.58%
Democratic	Ernie Soto Navarro	771	8.03%
Democratic	Rey Robles	581	6.05%
Total votes		9,607	100.00%

General Election Results
Party	Candidate	Votes	%
Democratic	Bernardo M. "Nayo" Cajero (incumbent)	9,895	50.68%
Democratic	E. S. "Bud" Walker (incumbent)	9,628	49.32%
Total votes		19,523	100.00%
Democratic gain from Republican			
Democratic gain from Republican			

=== District 11 ===
Primary Election Results
Party	Candidate	Votes	%
Democratic Party Primary Results
Democratic	Etta Mae Hutcheson (incumbent)	2,592	35.56%
Democratic	Ethel Maynard (incumbent)	1,869	25.64%
Democratic	Nathaniel "Nat" Russell	1,425	19.55%
Democratic	Edward Jackson	1,404	19.26%
Total votes		7,290	100.00%

General Election Results
Party	Candidate	Votes	%
Democratic	Etta Mae Hutcheson (incumbent)	9,492	51.00%
Democratic	Ethel Maynard (incumbent)	9,120	49.00%
Total votes		18,612	100.00%
Democratic gain from Republican			
Democratic gain from Republican			

=== District 12 ===
Primary Election Results
Party	Candidate	Votes	%
Democratic Party Primary Results
Democratic	J. H. (Jim) Dewberry Jr. (incumbent)	3,095	50.54%
Democratic	R. P. "Bob" Fricks (incumbent)	3,029	49.46%
Total votes		6,124	100.00%
American Independent Party Primary Results
American Independent	James Ray (Note: Was a write-in candidate in the primary election.)	7	100.00%
Total votes		7	100.00%

General Election Results
Party	Candidate	Votes	%
Democratic	J. H. (Jim) Dewberry Jr. (incumbent)	9,228	46.04%
Democratic	R. P. "Bob" Fricks (incumbent)	9,082	45.31%
American Independent	James Ray	1,734	8.65%
Total votes		20,044	100.00%
Democratic gain from Republican			
Democratic gain from Republican			

=== District 13 ===
Primary Election Results
Party	Candidate	Votes	%
Democratic Party Primary Results
Democratic	Marshall H. Chazen	2,439	52.70%
Democratic	Fred Novy	2,189	47.30%
Total votes		4,628	100.00%
Republican Party Primary Results
Republican	Thomas N. "Tom" Goodwin (incumbent)	2,310	51.04%
Republican	H. Thomas (Tam) Kincaid	2,216	48.96%
Total votes		4,526	100.00%

General Election Results
Party	Candidate	Votes	%
Republican	Thomas N. (Tom) Goodwin (incumbent)	8,167	29.12%
Republican	H. Thomas (Tam) Kincaid	8,067	28.77%
Democratic	Marshall H. Chazen	6,438	22.96%
Democratic	Fred Novy	5,371	19.15%
Total votes		28,043	100.00%
Republican hold			
Republican hold			

=== District 14 ===
Primary Election Results
Party	Candidate	Votes	%
Democratic Party Primary Results
Democratic	Helen Grace Carlson	2,534	51.03%
Democratic	James J. Magner	2,432	48.97%
Total votes		4,966	100.00%
Republican Party Primary Results
Republican	David B. Stone (incumbent)	2,012	50.38%
Republican	Albert C. Williams (incumbent)	1,982	49.62%
Total votes		3,994	100.00%
American Independent Party Primary Results
American Independent	Rev. George Butler	5	100.00%
American Independent	Lawrence F. Oliver	0	0.00%
Total votes		5	100.00%

General Election Results
Party	Candidate	Votes	%
Republican	David B. Stone (incumbent)	6,567	24.49%
Democratic	Helen Grace Carlson	6,407	23.89%
Democratic	James J. Magner	6,389	23.82%
Republican	Albert C. Williams (incumbent)	6,272	23.39%
American Independent	Rev. George Butler	631	2.35%
American Independent	Lawrence F. Oliver	553	2.06%
Total votes		26,819	100.00%
Republican hold			
Democratic gain from Republican			

=== District 15 ===
Primary Election Results
Party	Candidate	Votes	%
Democratic Party Primary Results
Democratic	Robert A. (Bob) Strauss	2,746	100.00%
Total votes		2,746	100.00%
Republican Party Primary Results
Republican	W. A. "Tony" Buehl (incumbent)	2,795	52.25%
Republican	Charles W. King	2,554	47.75%
Total votes		5,349	100.00%

General Election Results
Party	Candidate	Votes	%
Republican	W. A. "Tony" Buehl (incumbent)	10,581	39.33%
Republican	Charles W. King	8,866	32.95%
Democratic	Robert A. (Bob) Strauss	7,457	27.72%
Total votes		26,904	100.00%
Republican hold			
Republican hold			

=== District 16 ===
Primary Election Results
Party	Candidate	Votes	%
Democratic Party Primary Results
Democratic	Peter D. Foley	1,831	32.32%
Democratic	Chris Lawlor	1,711	30.20%
Democratic	Audrey E. Kaslo	1,269	22.40%
Democratic	Gary F. Enniss	854	15.08%
Total votes		5,665	100.00%
Republican Party Primary Results
Republican	C. W. "Bill" Lewis (incumbent)	2,183	35.24%
Republican	Hal Runyan	2,063	33.31%
Republican	Edward D. "Ed" Lewis	1,948	31.45%
Total votes		6,194	100.00%

General Election Results
Party	Candidate	Votes	%
Republican	C. W. "Bill" Lewis (incumbent)	9,036	30.71%
Republican	Hal Runyan	8,220	27.93%
Democratic	Chris Lawlor	6,124	20.81%
Democratic	Peter D. Foley	6,047	20.55%
Total votes		29,427	100.00%
Republican hold			
Republican hold			

=== District 17 ===
Primary Election Results
Party	Candidate	Votes	%
Democratic Party Primary Results
Democratic	Harold J. Moll	1,718	51.01%
Democratic	Rudy Kalcich	1,650	48.99%
Total votes		3,368	100.00%
Republican Party Primary Results
Republican	Stuart Schoenburg (incumbent)	3,631	42.80%
Republican	James B. Ratliff	2,593	30.56%
Republican	Mary Catherine Hohn	2,260	26.64%
Total votes		8,484	100.00%

General Election Results
Party	Candidate	Votes	%
Republican	Stuart Schoenburg (incumbent)	11,462	33.77%
Republican	James B. Ratliff	11,201	33.00%
Democratic	Harold Moll	5,745	16.93%
Democratic	Rudy Kalcich	5,535	16.31%
Total votes		33,943	100.00%
Republican hold			
Republican hold			

=== District 18 ===
Primary Election Results
Party	Candidate	Votes	%
Democratic Party Primary Results
Democratic	George Senner Wright	2,669	53.85%
Democratic	John T. Zastrow	2,287	46.15%
Total votes		4,956	100.00%
Republican Party Primary Results
Republican	Don Stewart (incumbent)	2,222	38.80%
Republican	Bob Strother	2,045	35.71%
Republican	Phil Yale	1,460	25.49%
Total votes		5,727	100.00%

General Election Results
Party	Candidate	Votes	%
Republican	Don Stewart (incumbent)	8,513	29.06%
Republican	Bob Strother	8,305	28.35%
Democratic	John T. Zastrow	6,490	22.16%
Democratic	George Senner Wright	5,984	20.43%
Total votes		29,292	100.00%
Republican hold			
Republican gain from Democratic			

=== District 19 ===
Primary Election Results
Party	Candidate	Votes	%
Democratic Party Primary Results
Democratic	Eugene E. Geary	2,325	100.00%
Total votes		2,325	100.00%
Republican Party Primary Results
Republican	Timothy A. Barrow (incumbent)	2,982	38.69%
Republican	Stan Akers (incumbent)	2,643	34.29%
Republican	Jon M. Nelson	2,082	27.01%
Total votes		7,707	100.00%

General Election Results
Party	Candidate	Votes	%
Republican	Timothy A. Barrow (incumbent)	10,077	40.08%
Republican	Stan Akers (incumbent)	9,711	38.62%
Democratic	Eugene E. Geary	5,357	21.30%
Total votes		25,145	100.00%
Republican gain from Democratic			
Republican gain from Democratic			

=== District 20 ===
Primary Election Results
Party	Candidate	Votes	%
Democratic Party Primary Results
Democratic	Stanley J. Marks	1,949	50.48%
Democratic	Ann M. Sawyer	1,912	49.52%
Total votes		3,861	100.00%
Republican Party Primary Results
Republican	Ruth Adams (incumbent)	2,558	32.24%
Republican	Richard Burgess	2,434	30.67%
Republican	Cecelia Kline	1,869	23.55%
Republican	Edward S. McSweeney	1,074	13.53%
Total votes		7,935	100.00%

General Election Results
Party	Candidate	Votes	%
Republican	Richard Burgess	10,222	34.11%
Republican	Ruth Adams (incumbent)	10,021	33.44%
Democratic	Ann M. Sawyer	5,317	17.74%
Democratic	Stanley J. Marks	4,407	14.71%
Total votes		29,967	100.00%
Republican hold			
Republican hold			

=== District 21 ===
Primary Election Results
Party	Candidate	Votes	%
Democratic Party Primary Results
Democratic	John Paul Jones	1,702	56.17%
Democratic	Gordon Cornelius	1,328	43.83%
Total votes		3,030	100.00%
Republican Party Primary Results
Republican	Peter Kay (incumbent)	2,657	27.53%
Republican	Sam Flake (incumbent)	2,379	24.65%
Republican	Dick Unangst	2,349	24.34%
Republican	Tom Henze	1,733	17.96%
Republican	Alfred L. Medesha	533	5.52%
Total votes		9,651	100.00%

General Election Results
Party	Candidate	Votes	%
Republican	Peter Kay (incumbent)	11,065	36.35%
Republican	Sam Flake (incumbent)	9,493	31.19%
Democratic	John Paul Jones	6,379	20.96%
Democratic	Gordon Cornelius	3,501	11.50%
Total votes		30,438	100.00%
Republican hold			
Republican hold			

=== District 22 ===
Primary Election Results
Party	Candidate	Votes	%
Democratic Party Primary Results
Democratic	William T. (Bill) Crowley	2,362	39.23%
Democratic	James H. (Jim) McCutchan	1,590	26.41%
Democratic	George Nossek	1,047	17.39%
Democratic	Wayne O. Earley	1,022	16.97%
Total votes		6,021	100.00%
Republican Party Primary Results
Republican	Bill McCune	1,727	33.68%
Republican	Howard Adams	1,019	19.88%
Republican	Ed Andrews (incumbent)	700	13.65%
Republican	R. D. "Bob" Terry	667	13.01%
Republican	Dan Hough	547	10.67%
Republican	Lyndon M. Keefer	467	9.11%
Total votes		5,127	100.00%

General Election Results
Party	Candidate	Votes	%
Republican	Bill McCune	8,386	29.74%
Republican	Howard Adams	7,323	25.97%
Democratic	William T. (Bill) Crowley	6,494	23.03%
Democratic	James H. (Jim) McCutchan	5,995	21.26%
Total votes		28,198	100.00%
Republican hold			
Republican hold			

=== District 23 ===
Primary Election Results
Party	Candidate	Votes	%
Republican Party Primary Results
Republican	Burton S. Barr (incumbent)	3,798	50.57%
Republican	Ruth Peck (incumbent)	3,712	49.43%
Total votes		7,510	100.00%

General Election Results
Party	Candidate	Votes	%
Republican	Burton S. Barr (incumbent)	10,595	50.61%
Republican	Ruth Peck (incumbent)	10,340	49.39%
Total votes		20,935	100.00%
Republican hold			
Republican hold			

=== District 24 ===
Primary Election Results
Party	Candidate	Votes	%
Democratic Party Primary Results
Democratic	Janet R. Stoffa, R.N.	2,636	85.11%
Democratic	Loren Vaughn Jr.	461	14.89%
Total votes		3,097	100.00%
Republican Party Primary Results
Republican	Jay C. Stuckey, Sr. (incumbent)	2,971	50.77%
Republican	Elizabeth Adams Rockwell (incumbent)	2,881	49.23%
Total votes		5,852	100.00%

General Election Results
Party	Candidate	Votes	%
Republican	Jay C. Stuckey, Sr. (incumbent)	7,930	30.47%
Republican	Elizabeth Adams Rockwell (incumbent)	7,643	29.37%
Democratic	Loren Vaughn Jr.	5,601	21.52%
Democratic	Janet R. Stoffa	4,851	18.64%
Total votes		26,025	100.00%
Republican hold			
Republican hold			

=== District 25 ===
Primary Election Results
Party	Candidate	Votes	%
Democratic Party Primary Results
Democratic	W. F. "Pat" Vipperman	3,132	100.00%
Total votes		3,132	100.00%
Republican Party Primary Results
Republican	D. Lee Jones (incumbent)	1,891	36.95%
Republican	Jim Skelly	1,551	30.30%
Republican	Gary Peter Klahr	1,136	22.20%
Republican	Leonard N. Stephens	540	10.55%
Total votes		5,118	100.00%

General Election Results
Party	Candidate	Votes	%
Republican	D. Lee Jones (incumbent)	7,415	34.28%
Republican	Jim Skelly	7,332	33.89%
Democratic	W. F. "Pat" Vipperman	6,885	31.83%
Total votes		21,632	100.00%
Republican hold			
Republican hold			

=== District 26 ===
Primary Election Results
Party	Candidate	Votes	%
Democratic Party Primary Results
Democratic	Nancy Robb Vandergrift	1,526	37.40%
Democratic	Mary L. Gilbert	1,417	34.73%
Democratic	Miss Janet Patten Heath	1,137	27.87%
Total votes		4,080	100.00%
Republican Party Primary Results
Republican	Bob Hungerford	1,546	28.30%
Republican	Frank Kelley (incumbent)	1,464	26.80%
Republican	Leonard F. Monti	1,394	25.52%
Republican	James "Jim" Shelley (incumbent)	1,058	19.37%
Total votes		5,462	100.00%
American Independent Party Primary Results
American Independent	Charlene Brooks	1	100.00%
Total votes		1	100.00%

General Election Results
Party	Candidate	Votes	%
Republican	Bob Hungerford	8,624	32.41%
Republican	Frank Kelley (incumbent)	7,850	29.50%
Democratic	Nancy Robb Vandergrift	5,112	19.21%
Democratic	Mary L. Gilbert	4,334	16.29%
American Independent	Charlene Brooks	691	2.60%
Total votes		26,611	100.00%
Republican gain from Democratic			
Republican gain from Democratic			

=== District 27 ===
Primary Election Results
Party	Candidate	Votes	%
Democratic Party Primary Results
Democratic	Manuel "Lito" Peña (incumbent)	2,733	40.66%
Democratic	Art Coppinger (incumbent)	2,353	35.00%
Democratic	Henry Austin Jr.	1,636	24.34%
Total votes		6,722	100.00%
Republican Party Primary Results
Republican	John F. McCauley	1,194	53.47%
Republican	Leonard Clayton Goltry	1,039	46.53%
Total votes		2,233	100.00%

General Election Results
Party	Candidate	Votes	%
Democratic	Art Coppinger (incumbent)	7,367	32.15%
Democratic	Manuel "Lito" Peña (incumbent)	7,038	30.71%
Republican	John F. McCauley	4,845	21.14%
Republican	Leonard Clayton Goltry	3,668	16.00%
Total votes		22,918	100.00%
Democratic gain from Republican			
Democratic gain from Republican			

=== District 28 ===
Primary Election Results
Party	Candidate	Votes	%
Democratic Party Primary Results
Democratic	Leon Thompson (incumbent)	2,547	31.04%
Democratic	Horace E. Owens	1,865	22.73%
Democratic	Juanita Orta Leon	1,230	14.99%
Democratic	David Miranda Valenzuela	1,090	13.28%
Democratic	Martin Q. Quesada	917	11.17%
Democratic	Willard O. Ricker	557	6.79%
Total votes		8,206	100.00%

General Election Results
Party	Candidate	Votes	%
Democratic	Leon Thompson (incumbent)	8,845	53.03%
Democratic	Horace E. Owens	7,833	46.97%
Total votes		16,678	100.00%
Democratic gain from Republican			
Democratic gain from Republican			

=== District 29 ===
Primary Election Results
Party	Candidate	Votes	%
Democratic Party Primary Results
Democratic	Tim Weeks	2,165	35.13%
Democratic	Efren Navarette	2,038	33.07%
Democratic	Al Fenn	1,959	31.79%
Total votes		6,162	100.00%
Republican Party Primary Results
Republican	James J. Sossaman (incumbent)	2,381	31.88%
Republican	Michael Goodwin	1,948	26.08%
Republican	Frank S. Bradley	1,912	25.60%
Republican	Dorothy Partridge Munoz	1,228	16.44%
Total votes		7,469	100.00%

General Election Results
Party	Candidate	Votes	%
Republican	Michael Goodwin	9,267	30.00%
Republican	James J. Sossaman (incumbent)	9,246	29.93%
Democratic	Efren Navarette	6,190	20.04%
Democratic	Tim Weeks	6,185	20.02%
Total votes		30,888	100.00%
Republican gain from Democratic			
Republican gain from Democratic			

=== District 30 ===
Primary Election Results
Party	Candidate	Votes	%
Republican Party Primary Results
Republican	Stan Turley (incumbent)	4,153	43.35%
Republican	Jim Cooper (incumbent)	2,986	31.17%
Republican	Dave Hall	2,441	25.48%
Total votes		9,580	100.00%

General Election Results
Party	Candidate	Votes	%
Republican	Stan Turley (incumbent)	11,750	53.37%
Republican	Jim Cooper (incumbent)	10,268	46.63%
Total votes		22,018	100.00%
Republican gain from Democratic			
Republican gain from Democratic			
