= Betty Morrison =

State legislator in Arizona

Betty Morrison was a state legislator in Arizona. A Democrat, she lived in Phoenix and represented Maricopa County in 1975.

She proposed a bill to ban adult theaters and bookstores.

== See also ==
- 32nd Arizona State Legislature
