= 1982 Arizona gubernatorial election =

- November 2, 1982
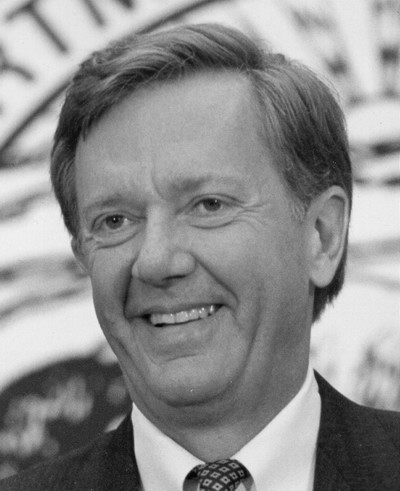

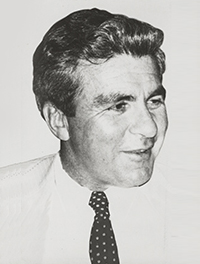
Nominee	Bruce Babbitt	Leo Corbet	Sam Steiger
Party	Democratic	Republican	Libertarian
Popular vote	453,795	235,877	36,649
Percentage	62.47%	32.47%	5.05%
- County results Babbitt: 50–60% 60–70% 70–80%
Governor before election
Bruce Babbitt
Democratic
Elected Governor
Bruce Babbitt
Democratic

The 1982 Arizona gubernatorial election took place on November 2, 1982, for the post of Governor of Arizona. Democratic incumbent Bruce Babbitt defeated Republican nominee Leo Corbet and Libertarian candidate and former U.S. Representative Sam Steiger. Evan Mecham unsuccessfully ran for the Republican nomination.

This was the last time until 2002 that a Democrat would be elected Governor of Arizona. (Note: Rose Mofford, a Democrat, would serve as governor from 1988 to 1991 following the impeachment of Governor Evan Mecham, but was never officially elected as Governor.)

== Democratic primary ==
=== Candidates ===
- Bruce Babbitt, incumbent Governor
- Steve Jancek

=== Results ===
Democratic primary results
Party	Candidate	Votes	%
Democratic	Bruce Babbitt (incumbent)	142,559	85.85%
Democratic	Steve Jancek (Note: Died before election day)	23,492	14.15%
Total votes		166,051	100.00%

== Republican primary ==
=== Candidates ===
- Leo Corbet, member of Arizona Senate
- Evan Mecham, perennial candidate
- Gene Thon

=== Results ===
Republican primary results
Party	Candidate	Votes	%
Republican	Leo Corbet	108,766	61.71%
Republican	Evan Mecham	67,456	38.27%
Republican	Gene Thon (write-in)	23	0.01%
Total votes		176,245	100.00%

== General election ==
=== Results ===
Arizona gubernatorial election, 1982
Party	Candidate	Votes	%	±%
Democratic	Bruce Babbitt (incumbent)	453,795	62.47%	+10.00%
Republican	Leo Corbet	235,877	32.47%	−12.29%
Libertarian	Sam Steiger	36,649	5.05%	+3.11%
Republican	Dave Duncan (write-in)	28	0.00%	
Independent	Sandy Greeneltch (write-in)	13	0.00%	
Independent	Frank Henry Beversdorf, Sr. (write-in)	2	0.00%	
Majority		217,918	30.00%	
Total votes		726,364	100.00%	
Democratic hold		Swing	+22.29%	

=== Results by county ===
County	Bruce Babbitt Democratic		Leo Corbet Republican		Sam Steiger Libertarian		Write-in		Margin		Total votes cast
County	#	%	#	%	#	%	#	%	#	%	Total votes cast
Apache	6,584	66.82%	2,723	27.64%	548	5.54%	0	0.00%	3,861	39.19%	9,853
Cochise	13,196	65.67%	6,082	30.27%	815	4.06%	0	0.00%	7,114	35.41%	20,093
Coconino	14,773	68.97%	4,997	23.33%	1,643	7.67%	6	0.03%	9,776	45.64%	21,419
Gila	7,343	62.46%	3,645	31.00%	769	6.54%	0	0.00%	3,698	31.45%	11,757
Graham	4,127	62.07%	2,123	31.93%	399	6.00%	0	0.00%	2,004	30.14%	6,649
Greenlee	2,578	78.53%	580	17.67%	125	3.81%	0	0.00%	1,998	60.86%	3,283
Maricopa	228,217	58.27%	142,938	36.50%	20,457	5.22%	23	0.01%	85,279	21.78%	391,635
Mohave	10,533	57.93%	6,617	36.39%	1,033	5.68%	0	0.00%	3,916	21.54%	18,183
Navajo	8,566	61.44%	4,611	33.07%	759	5.44%	7	0.05%	3,955	28.37%	13,943
Pima	113,982	72.10%	38,235	24.19%	5,873	3.71%	2	0.00%	75,747	47.91%	158,092
Pinal	14,527	67.61%	5,882	27.38%	1,076	5.01%	1	0.00%	8,645	40.24%	21,486
Santa Cruz	3,519	73.65%	1,098	22.98%	161	3.37%	0	0.00%	2,421	50.67%	4,778
Yavapai	14,339	54.32%	9,930	37.62%	2,127	8.06%	2	0.01%	4,409	16.70%	26,398
Yuma	11,511	61.25%	6,416	34.14%	866	4.61%	2	0.01%	5,095	27.11%	18,795
Totals	453,795	62.47%	235,877	32.47%	36,649	5.05%	43	0.01%	217,918	30.00%	726,364

==== Counties that flipped from Republican to Democratic ====
- Graham
- Maricopa
- Mohave
- Yavapai
