= Lucy Davidson =

Arizona politician (1920–2001)

Lucille Wolfe Davidson (November 11, 1920 - November 19, 2001) was a teacher and state legislator in Arizona. She lived in Tucson and represented District 14 in the Arizona Senate from 1974 to 1976, as a Democrat.

Lucille Wolfe was born in New York City. She married Edward S. Davidson. She introduced the "Death with Dignity Bill" and was an advocate for prison reform. She lost her 1976 re-election campaign to Republican Jim Kolbe.

She served on Arizona's Bicentennial Commission.

Davidson died November 19, 2001 at her home in Tucson aged 81. She had been diagnosed with colorectal cancer a couple of months prior to her death, but had declined chemotherapy.

== See also ==
- 1974 Arizona Senate election
