= Howard S. Baldwin =

American businessman and politician (1934–2008)

Howard Stanley Baldwin (December 15, 1934 – July 22, 2008) was an American businessman and politician.

Born in New Haven, Connecticut, Baldwin moved to Scottsdale, Arizona in 1960. Baldwin was in radio and television advertising business and later was also in the real estate and insurance business. Baldwin was involved with the Republican Party. Baldwin served in the Arizona State Senate from 1969 until 1975. He died suddenly in the Caribbean while on vacation with his family.
