= John C. Pritzlaff Jr. =

American politician (1925–2005)

John Pritzlaff

Member of the Arizona Senate
- In office 1975–1982

United States Ambassador to Malta
- In office September 4, 1969 – February 24, 1972
- President: Richard Nixon
- Preceded by: Hugh H. Smythe
- Succeeded by: John I. Getz

Member of the Arizona House of Representatives
- In office 1963–1969

Personal details
- Born: John Charles Pritzlaff Jr. May 10, 1925 Milwaukee, Wisconsin, U.S.
- Died: May 2, 2005 (aged 79) Arizona, U.S.
- Party: Republican
- Spouse: Mary Dell Olin (m. 1951)
- Education: Princeton University (BA)

Military service
- Branch/service: United States Army
- Battles/wars: World War II

John Charles Pritzlaff Jr. (May 10, 1925 – May 2, 2005) was an American businessman, politician, and diplomat who served in both chambers of the Arizona State Legislature. He also served as the United States Ambassador to Malta from 1969 to 1972.

== Early life and education ==
Pritzlaff was born in Milwaukee, Wisconsin. In 1958, Pritzlaff moved to Phoenix, Arizona, with his family. Pritlaff served in the United States Army during World War II. In 1947, he received his bachelor's degree in history and political science from Princeton University.

== Career ==
Prior to his political career, he was the Vice-President and General Manager of the John Pritzlaff Hardware Company in Milwaukee, founded by John C. Pritzlaff. In Phoenix, Pritzlaff owned the Rockmount Real Estate Investments. He was involved with the Republican Party in Wisconsin and Arizona.

He was a member of the Arizona House of Representatives from 1963 to 1969 and of the Arizona Senate from 1975 to 1982. He also served as the United States Ambassador to Malta from 1969 to 1972.

== Personal life ==
On February 10, 1951, Pritzlaff married Mary Dell Olin, the daughter of Spencer Truman Olin an executive at Olin Corporation. The family lived in Milwaukee, Wisconsin before moving to Phoenix, Arizona, in 1958. Their daughter Anne, married former Arizona Governor, Fife Symington.

Pritzlaff died on May 2, 2005, in Arizona.

Diplomatic posts
Preceded by Hugh H. Smythe	United States Ambassador to Malta; 1969–1972	Succeeded by John I. Getz
