= Tony Gabaldon =

American politician (1930–1998)

Antonio Alfonso "Tony" Gabaldon (June 3, 1930 – January 3, 1998) was a Mexican-American teacher and principal, who became a politician and was elected as Arizona state senator. Gabaldon represented citizens of District 2 in Arizona, which includes Flagstaff, the largest city in northern Arizona, and Navajo and Apache counties. He is the father of author Diana Gabaldon.

== Biography ==
Antonio Gabaldon was born in Belen, New Mexico, near Albuquerque, to Antonio Gabaldon Sr. (1885-1932), a farmer, and his wife, Ines (née Chávez; 1885–1966). He moved to Arizona at the age of thirteen. As a high school student in Flagstaff, he was a distinguished athlete and all-state quarterback. He remained an enthusiastic supporter of athletic events in the community through his later work as a teacher, coach and principal. His accomplishments earned him induction into the Flagstaff High School Hall of Fame.

=== Political career ===
Elected to the Arizona senate in 1972, Gabaldon served for 16 years, being re-elected through that period. He served in other political offices, as well as being active in civic life. He was elected as Coconino County supervisor, serving until his retirement in 1995.

== Death ==
Gabaldon died at his home from a heart attack on January 3, 1998, at the age of sixty-seven. He was survived by his second wife Margaret, to whom he was married for 23 years at the time of his death; two daughters (with his first wife, Jacqueline Sykes Gabaldon, Sept. 16, 1930-July 21, 1971): one of whom the bestselling author Diana J. Gabaldon; and four grandchildren.

The Arizona Senate passed a resolution celebrating Gabaldon's life, praising his "tremendous ability" in politics, generosity with his "time, energy, and abilities" in voluntary endeavours, and "exceptional cooking skills", which he employed for fundraising purposes and the provision of meals for senior citizens' centers in his district.

== Legacy and honors ==
- He was inducted into the Flagstaff High School Hall of Fame.
- Gabaldon Hall, a residential dormitory at Northern Arizona University, was named in his honor.
