= Leo Corbet =

American lawyer and politician (1936–2019)

Leo Frank Corbet Jr. (November 16, 1936 – December 22, 2019) was an American lawyer and politician who served in the Arizona Senate, the upper house of the state legislature, mostly during the 1970s and 1980s. In 1982, he was the unsuccessful Republican nominee for Governor of Arizona.

== Biography ==
Corbet was born in Lordsburg, New Mexico, and graduated from Yuma High School in Yuma, Arizona. He earned both his bachelor's and law degrees from the University of Arizona. Afterward, Corbet practiced law in Phoenix, Arizona.

=== Arizona Senate and gubernatorial candidacy ===
Corbet served in the Arizona Senate from 1971 to 1983 and again from 1989 to 1991. He did not seek re-election in 1982, but won the Republican nomination for governor. Corbet lost the general election to Democratic incumbent Bruce Babbitt.

=== Later life and death ===
In 2001, Corbet underwent heart transplant surgery. He died in Phoenix in 2019 at the age of 83.

== Notes ==
Party political offices
Preceded by Evan Mecham	Republican nominee for Governor of Arizona; 1982	Succeeded by Evan Mecham
