= Jones Osborn =

American politician and publisher (1921–2014)

Jones Osborn (October 22, 1921 – November 6, 2014) was an American politician, newspaper editor, and publisher.

Born in Bicknell, Indiana, Jones moved with his parents to Yuma, Arizona, where they bought two local daily newspapers. Jones learned the printing business and eventually became editor and publisher of the Yuma Daily Sun. He went to the University of Arizona and then served in the United States Army during World War II. In 1971, Jones served in the Arizona House of Representatives as a Democrat, and then served in the Arizona State Senate from 1973 until 1993. After he retired from the legislature, Osborn served on the Arizona Judicial Commission. He also served on the Western Interstate Commission for Higher Education and was chairman of the Commission. He died in Yuma.
