= Arthur J. Hubbard Sr. =

Native American politician and Navajo code talker (1912–2014)

- Born: January 23, 1912; Topawa, Arizona Territory (now Arizona)
- Died: February 7, 2014 (aged 102); Phoenix, Arizona, U.S.
- Citizenship: Navajo Nation • U.S.
- Known for: Being a Navajo Code Talker

Arthur J. Hubbard Sr. (January 23, 1912 – February 7, 2014) was an American state senator from Arizona, who served as a Navajo Code Talker instructor in World War II.

== Life ==
Hubbard was born in 1912 on the Tohono O'odham Nation in Topawa, Arizona Territory, on January 23, 1912, about three weeks before Arizona became a state. He grew up in Ganado, Arizona, which is part of the Navajo Nation, and studied at the University of Arizona. He was the leader of a Navajo tribal band, as a trombone player and singer.

From 1939 to 1945 Hubbard voluntarily served in the U. S. Marine Corps. During World War II, he was a Navajo Code Talker instructor training over 200 men to transmit coded messages using the Navajo language. After his military duties, the then Governor Jack Williams appointed him Director of Indian Development District of Arizona. In 1972 he became state senator in Arizona, serving for 12 years until 1984. This made him the first Native American senator in the Arizona State Legislature. His other work includes serving as a water rights advisor to the Tohono O'odham Nation, and as a Navajo culture and language instructor at Arizona State University. He also played an important part in the establishment of Diné College (originally known as Navajo Community College), which was the first college established within the Navajo Nation.

Hubbard was inducted into the Arizona Veterans Hall of Fame and the Arizona Democratic Party Hall of Fame. He received the Navajo Code Talker Congressional Silver Medal in 2000. He died at age 102 on February 7, 2014, in Phoenix, Arizona. On his death, flags across the Navajo Nation were flown at half-staff in his honor.
