= Stan Turley =

American politician (1921–2014)

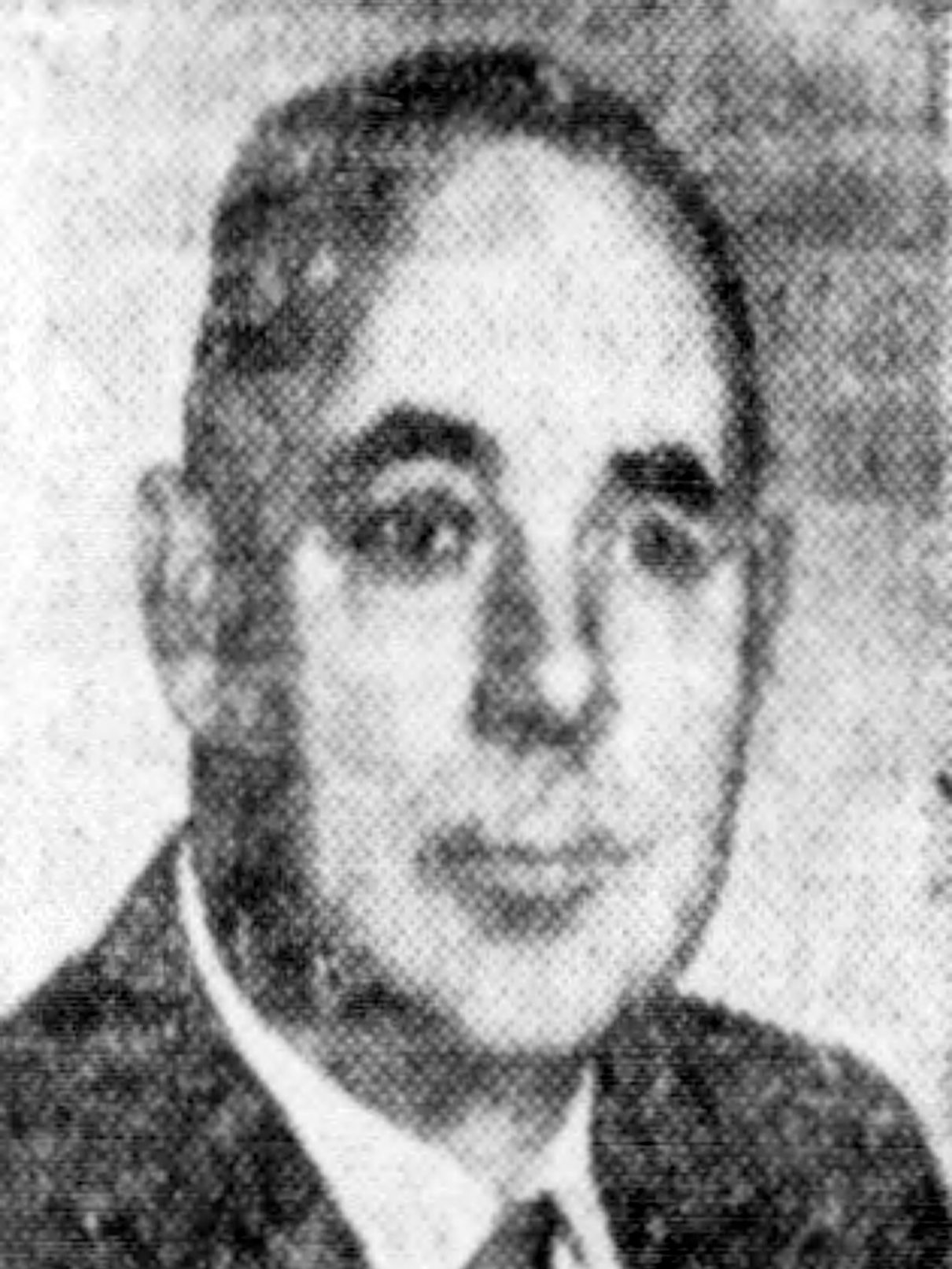

Stanley Frederick "Stan" Turley (February 27, 1921 – April 26, 2014) was an American politician and businessman.

Born in Snowflake, Arizona, Turley went to Brigham Young University, He then served in the United States Army during World War II. He was a farmer and was in banking and real estate. Turley served in the Arizona House of Representatives from 1964 to 1972 as a Republican and was the Speaker of the Arizona House of Representatives. He then served in the Arizona State Senate from 1972 to 1986 and was the President of the Arizona Senate. He died in Mesa, Arizona.
