= 2016 Arizona House of Representatives election =

- November 8, 2016

All 60 seats in the Arizona House 31 seats needed for a majority
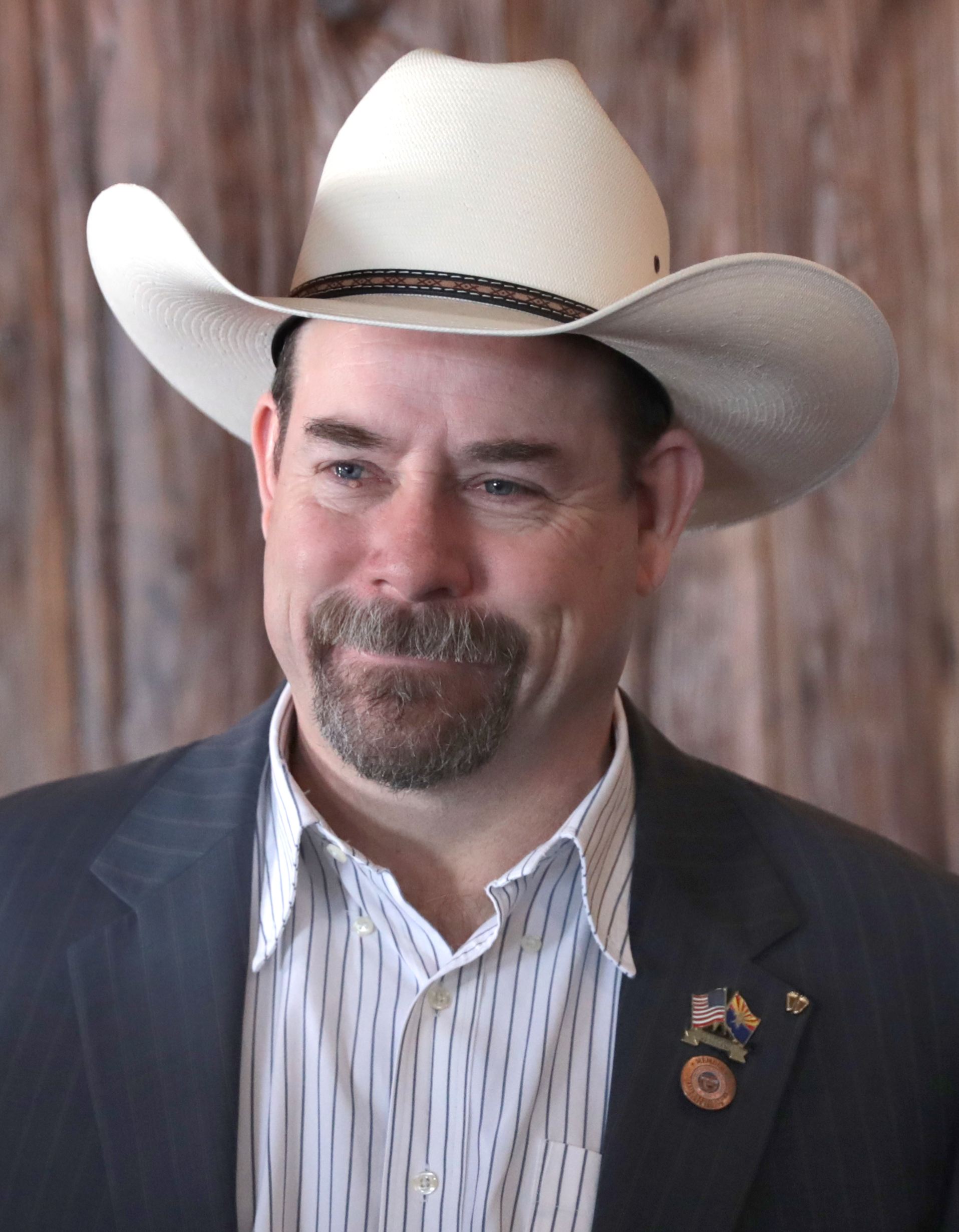

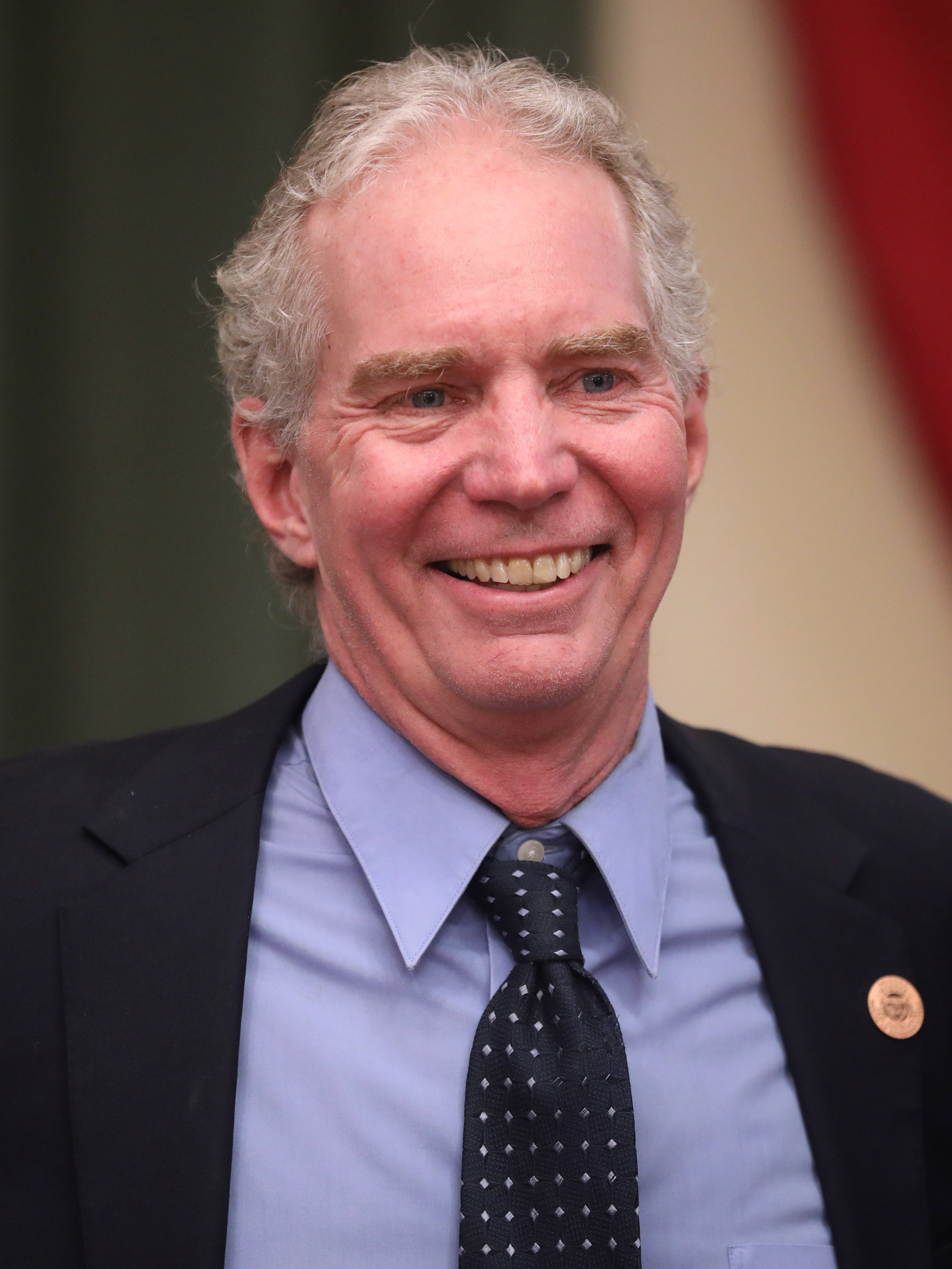
| | Majority party | Minority party |
|---|---|---|
| Leader | David Gowan (retired) | Eric Meyer (retired) |
| Party | Republican | Democratic |
| Leader's seat | 14th - Sierra Vista | 28th - Paradise Valley |
| Last election | 36 | 24 |
| Seats after | 35 | 25 |
| Seat change | ▼1 | ▲1 |
| Popular vote | 2,032,005 | 1,485,924 |
| Percentage | 56.76% | 41.51% |
- Results: Democratic hold Democratic gain Republican hold Republican gain
Speaker before election
David Gowan
Republican
Elected Speaker
J.D. Mesnard
Republican

The 2016 Arizona House of Representatives election took place on Tuesday, November 8, 2016, with the primary election held on Tuesday, August 30, 2016. Arizona voters elected all 60 members of the Arizona House of Representatives in multi-member districts to serve two-year terms.

The election coincided with United States national elections and Arizona state elections, including U.S. president, U.S. Senate, U.S. House, and Arizona Senate.

Following the previous election in 2014, Republicans held a 36-to-24-seat majority over Democrats. Republicans maintained their majority in 2016, though the GOP majority narrowed to 35 seats. At 25 members, Democrats experienced a net gain of one seat. The newly elected members served in the 53rd Arizona State Legislature, during which Republican J.D. Mesnard was elected as Speaker of the Arizona House. (Note: J.D. Mesnard was elected by acclamation as Speaker for the 53rd legislature.)

== Retiring incumbents ==
=== Democrats ===
1. District 4: Lisa Otondo (Note: Elected to the Arizona Senate.)
2. District 7: Albert Hale
3. District 7: Jennifer D. Benally
4. District 10: Bruce Wheeler
5. District 26: Juan Jose Mendez (Note: Elected to the Arizona Senate.)
6. District 28: Eric Meyer (Note: Representative Eric Meyer ran for Arizona Senate, but was defeated in the general election by Republican Kate Brophy McGee.) (term-limited)
7. District 29: Ceci Velásquez
8. District 30: Debbie McCune-Davis

=== Republicans ===
1. District 1: Karen Fann (Note: Elected to the Arizona Senate.)
2. District 5: Sonny Borrelli (Note: Elected to the Arizona Senate.)
3. District 8: Frank Pratt (Note: Elected to the Arizona Senate.) (term-limited)
4. District 12: Warren Petersen (Note: Elected to the Arizona Senate.)
5. District 13: Steve Montenegro (Note: Elected to the Arizona Senate.) (term-limited)
6. District 14: David Gowan (Note: Representative David Gowan ran for U.S. House, but was defeated in the Republican primary election by Paul Babeu.) (term-limited)
7. District 14: David Stevens (term-limited)
8. District 21: Rick Gray (Note: Representative Rick Gray ran for Arizona Corporation Commission, but was defeated in the Republican primary election.)
9. District 25: Justin Olson (Note: Representative Justin Olson ran for U.S. House, but was defeated in the Republican primary election by Andy Biggs.)
10. District 28: Kate Brophy McGee (Note: Elected to the Arizona Senate.)

== Incumbents defeated in primary election ==
=== Democrats ===
1. District 9: Matthew A. "Matt" Kopec (Note: Democratic representative Victoria Steele resigned effective January 11, 2016. Matthew A. "Matt" Kopec (D) was appointed on January 19, 2016 by the Pima County Board of Supervisors to fill the House vacancy in Legislative District 9 and sworn into office on January 20, 2016.)
2. District 26: Celeste Plumlee (Note: Democratic representative Andrew C. Sherwood was appointed on November 5, 2015, by the Maricopa County Board of Supervisors to fill the Senate vacancy in Legislative District 26. Celeste Plumlee (D) was appointed on December 9, 2015, by the Maricopa County Board of Supervisors to fill the House vacancy in Legislative District 26 and sworn into office on December 15, 2015.)
3. District 30: Jonathan Larkin

== Incumbents defeated in general election ==
=== Democrat ===
1. District 10: Stefanie Mach

=== Republicans ===
1. District 2: John Christopher Ackerley
2. District 18: Bob Robson

== Predictions ==
| Source | Ranking | As of |
|---|---|---|
| Governing | Lean R | October 12, 2016 |

== Summary of results ==
Italics denote an open seat held by the incumbent party; bold text denotes a gain for a party.

| District | Incumbent | Party | Elected representative | Outcome |
|---|---|---|---|---|
| 1st | Noel Campbell | Rep | Noel Campbell | Rep hold |
| 1st | Karen Fann | Rep | David Stringer | Rep hold |
| 2nd | Rosanna Gabaldón | Dem | Rosanna Gabaldón | Dem hold |
| 2nd | John Christopher Ackerley | Rep | **Daniel Hernandez** | **Dem gain** |
| 3rd | Sally Ann Gonzales | Dem | Sally Ann Gonzales | Dem hold |
| 3rd | Macario Saldate | Dem | Macario Saldate | Dem hold |
| 4th | Charlene Fernandez | Dem | Charlene Fernandez | Dem hold |
| 4th | Lisa Otondo | Dem | Jesus Rubalcava (Note: Democratic representative Jesus Rubalcava resigned July 28, 2017. Geraldine "Gerae" Peten (D) was appointed by the Maricopa County Board of Supervisors on August 16, 2017 and sworn in on August 25, 2017 to fill the vacancy in the House in Legislative District 4.) | Dem hold |
| 5th | Regina Cobb | Rep | Regina Cobb | Rep hold |
| 5th | Sonny Borrelli | Rep | Paul Mosley | Rep hold |
| 6th | Brenda Barton | Rep | Brenda Barton | Rep hold |
| 6th | Bob Thorpe | Rep | Bob Thorpe | Rep hold |
| 7th | Albert Hale | Dem | Eric Descheenie | Dem hold |
| 7th | Jennifer D. Benally | Dem | Wenona Benally | Dem hold |
| 8th | Thomas "T.J." Shope | Rep | Thomas "T.J." Shope | Rep hold |
| 8th | Frank Pratt | Rep | David Cook | Rep hold |
| 9th | Randall "Randy" Friese | Dem | Randall "Randy" Friese | Dem hold |
| 9th | Matthew A. "Matt" Kopec | Dem | Pamela Powers Hannley | Dem hold |
| 10th | Bruce Wheeler | Dem | Kirsten Engel | Dem hold |
| 10th | Stefanie Mach | Dem | **Todd Clodfelter** | **Rep gain** |
| 11th | Mark Finchem | Rep | Mark Finchem | Rep hold |
| 11th | Venden "Vince" Leach | Rep | Venden "Vince" Leach | Rep hold |
| 12th | Eddie Farnsworth | Rep | Eddie Farnsworth | Rep hold |
| 12th | Warren Petersen | Rep | Travis Grantham | Rep hold |
| 13th | Darin Mitchell | Rep | Darin Mitchell | Rep hold |
| 13th | Steve Montenegro | Rep | Don Shooter (Note: Republican representative Don Shooter was expelled on February 1, 2018 by House Resolution 2003. Timothy M. "Tim" Dunn (R) was appointed by the Yuma County Board of Supervisors on February 12, 2018 and administered the Oath of Office on February 13, 2018.) | Rep hold |
| 14th | David Gowan | Rep | Becky Nutt | Rep hold |
| 14th | David Stevens | Rep | Drew John | Rep hold |
| 15th | Heather Carter | Rep | Heather Carter | Rep hold |
| 15th | John Allen | Rep | John Allen | Rep hold |
| 16th | Kelly Townsend | Rep | Kelly Townsend | Rep hold |
| 16th | Doug Coleman | Rep | Doug Coleman | Rep hold |
| 17th | J.D. Mesnard | Rep | J.D. Mesnard | Rep hold |
| 17th | Jeff Weninger | Rep | Jeff Weninger | Rep hold |
| 18th | Jill Norgaard | Rep | Jill Norgaard | Rep hold |
| 18th | Bob Robson | Rep | **Denise "Mitzi" Epstein** | **Dem gain** |
| 19th | Mark Cardenas | Dem | Mark Cardenas | Dem hold |
| 19th | Diego Espinoza | Dem | Diego Espinoza | Dem hold |
| 20th | Paul Boyer | Rep | Paul Boyer | Rep hold |
| 20th | Anthony Kern | Rep | Anthony Kern | Rep hold |
| 21st | Tony Rivero | Rep | Tony Rivero | Rep hold |
| 21st | Rick Gray | Rep | Kevin Payne | Rep hold |
| 22nd | Phil Lovas | Rep | Phil Lovas (Note: Republican representative Phil Lovas resigned from the House on April 17, 2017. Ben Toma (R) was appointed by the Maricopa County Board of Supervisors and sworn in on April 26, 2017 to fill the vacancy in the House in Legislative District 22.) | Rep hold |
| 22nd | David Livingston | Rep | David Livingston | Rep hold |
| 23rd | Michelle Ugenti-Rita | Rep | Michelle Ugenti-Rita | Rep hold |
| 23rd | Jay Lawrence | Rep | Jay Lawrence | Rep hold |
| 24th | Lela Alston | Dem | Lela Alston | Dem hold |
| 24th | Ken Clark | Dem | Ken Clark | Dem hold |
| 25th | Russell W. "Rusty" Bowers | Rep | Russell W. "Rusty" Bowers | Rep hold |
| 25th | Justin Olson | Rep | Michelle Udall | Rep hold |
| 26th | Juan Jose Mendez | Dem | Athena Salman | Dem hold |
| 26th | Celeste Plumlee | Dem | Isela Blanc | Dem hold |
| 27th | Reginald Bolding | Dem | Reginald Bolding | Dem hold |
| 27th | Rebecca Rios | Dem | Rebecca Rios | Dem hold |
| 28th | Eric Meyer | Dem | Kelli Butler | Dem hold |
| 28th | Kate Brophy McGee | Rep | Maria Syms | Rep hold |
| 29th | Richard C. Andrade | Dem | Richard C. Andrade | Dem hold |
| 29th | Ceci Velásquez | Dem | César Chávez | Dem hold |
| 30th | Debbie McCune-Davis | Dem | Otoniel "Tony" Navarrete | Dem hold |
| 30th | Jonathan Larkin | Dem | Ray Martinez | Dem hold |

== Detailed results ==
Sources for election results:

=== District 1 ===
Primary election results
| Party | Candidate | Votes | % |
Republican Party primary results
| Republican | Noel Campbell (incumbent) | 23,548 | 39.16% |
| Republican | David Stringer | 18,672 | 31.05% |
| Republican | Chip Davis | 17,919 | 29.80% |
| Total votes | | 60,139 | 100.00% |
Democratic Party primary results
| Democratic | Peter Pierson | 9,930 | 100.00% |
| Total votes | | 9,930 | 100.00% |
Green Party primary results
| Green | Haryaksha Gregor Knauer | 95 | 100.00% |
| Total votes | | 95 | 100.00% |

General election results
| Party | Candidate | Votes | % |
|---|---|---|---|
| Republican | Noel Campbell (incumbent) | 70,412 | 38.70% |
| Republican | David Stringer | 65,993 | 36.27% |
| Democratic | Peter Pierson | 33,396 | 18.35% |
| Green | Haryaksha Gregor Knauer | 12,145 | 6.68% |
| Total votes | | 181,946 | 100.00% |
| Republican hold | | | |
| Republican hold | | | |

=== District 2 ===
Primary election results
| Party | Candidate | Votes | % |
Democratic Party primary results
| Democratic | Rosanna Gabaldón (incumbent) | 8,730 | 37.74% |
| Democratic | Daniel Hernandez | 7,790 | 33.68% |
| Democratic | Aaron Baumann | 6,610 | 28.58% |
| Total votes | | 23,130 | 100.00% |
Republican Party primary results
| Republican | John Christopher Ackerley (incumbent) | 10,604 | 100.00% |
| Total votes | | 10,604 | 100.00% |

General election results
| Party | Candidate | Votes | % |
|---|---|---|---|
| Democratic | Daniel Hernandez | 32,651 | 34.86% |
| Democratic | Rosanna Gabaldón (incumbent) | 32,495 | 34.70% |
| Republican | John Christopher Ackerley (incumbent) | 28,506 | 30.44% |
| Total votes | | 93,652 | 100.00% |
| Democratic gain from Republican | | | |
| Democratic hold | | | |

=== District 3 ===
Primary election results
| Party | Candidate | Votes | % |
Democratic Party primary results
| Democratic | Sally Ann Gonzales (incumbent) | 12,756 | 55.21% |
| Democratic | Macario Saldate (incumbent) | 10,347 | 44.79% |
| Total votes | | 23,103 | 100.00% |
Green Party primary results
| Green | Edward J. "Trey" Cizek III | 159 | 100.00% |
| Total votes | | 159 | 100.00% |

General election results
| Party | Candidate | Votes | % |
|---|---|---|---|
| Democratic | Sally Ann Gonzales (incumbent) | 41,706 | 50.15% |
| Democratic | Macario Saldate (incumbent) | 31,299 | 37.64% |
| Green | Edward J. "Trey" Cizek III | 10,150 | 12.21% |
| Total votes | | 83,155 | 100.00% |
| Democratic hold | | | |
| Democratic hold | | | |

=== District 4 ===
Primary election results
| Party | Candidate | Votes | % |
Democratic Party primary results
| Democratic | Charlene R. Fernandez (incumbent) | 6,623 | 53.86% |
| Democratic | Jesus Rubalcava | 5,673 | 46.14% |
| Total votes | | 12,296 | 100.00% |
Republican Party primary results
| Republican | Richard Hopkins (Note: The candidate ran a write-in campaign in this election.) (Note: Despite coming in first place in the Republican primary as a write-in candidate, Richard Hopkins did not advance to the general election.) | 186 | 100.00% |
| Total votes | | 186 | 100.00% |

General election results
| Party | Candidate | Votes | % |
|---|---|---|---|
| Democratic | Charlene R. Fernandez (incumbent) | 29,755 | 51.70% |
| Democratic | Jesus Rubalcava | 27,794 | 48.30% |
| Total votes | | 57,549 | 100.00% |
| Democratic hold | | | |
| Democratic hold | | | |

=== District 5 ===
Primary election results
| Party | Candidate | Votes | % |
Republican Party primary results
| Republican | Paul Mosley | 12,202 | 29.57% |
| Republican | Regina Cobb (incumbent) | 11,472 | 27.80% |
| Republican | Sam Medrano | 9,772 | 23.68% |
| Republican | Jennifer Jones | 7,816 | 18.94% |
| Total votes | | 41,262 | 100.00% |
Democratic Party primary results
| Democratic | Beth Weisser | 5,505 | 100.00% |
| Total votes | | 5,505 | 100.00% |
Green Party primary results
| Green | Leo Biasiucci | 57 | 100.00% |
| Total votes | | 57 | 100.00% |

General election results
| Party | Candidate | Votes | % |
|---|---|---|---|
| Republican | Paul Mosley | 49,453 | 39.15% |
| Republican | Regina Cobb (incumbent) | 47,738 | 37.79% |
| Democratic | Beth Weisser | 20,301 | 16.07% |
| Green | Leo Biasiucci | 8,827 | 6.99% |
| Total votes | | 126,319 | 100.00% |
| Republican hold | | | |
| Republican hold | | | |

=== District 6 ===
Primary election results
| Party | Candidate | Votes | % |
Republican Party primary results
| Republican | Bob Thorpe (incumbent) | 18,439 | 52.86% |
| Republican | Brenda Barton (incumbent) | 16,444 | 47.14% |
| Total votes | | 34,883 | 100.00% |
Democratic Party primary results
| Democratic | Alex Martinez | 13,275 | 100.00% |
| Total votes | | 13,275 | 100.00% |

General election results
| Party | Candidate | Votes | % |
|---|---|---|---|
| Republican | Bob Thorpe (incumbent) | 48,999 | 34.79% |
| Republican | Brenda Barton (incumbent) | 47,631 | 33.81% |
| Democratic | Alex Martinez | 44,229 | 31.40% |
| Total votes | | 140,859 | 100.00% |
| Republican hold | | | |
| Republican hold | | | |

=== District 7 ===
Primary election results
| Party | Candidate | Votes | % |
Democratic Party primary results
| Democratic | Eric Descheenie | 14,221 | 53.84% |
| Democratic | Wenona Benally | 12,190 | 46.16% |
| Total votes | | 26,411 | 100.00% |

General election results
| Party | Candidate | Votes | % |
|---|---|---|---|
| Democratic | Eric Descheenie | 41,398 | 52.63% |
| Democratic | Wenona Benally | 37,261 | 47.37% |
| Total votes | | 78,659 | 100.00% |
| Democratic hold | | | |
| Democratic hold | | | |

=== District 8 ===
Primary election results
| Party | Candidate | Votes | % |
Republican Party primary results
| Republican | Thomas "T.J." Shope (incumbent) | 9,266 | 52.59% |
| Republican | David Cook | 8,352 | 47.41% |
| Total votes | | 17,618 | 100.00% |
Democratic Party primary results
| Democratic | Carmen Casillas | 9,148 | 100.00% |
| Total votes | | 9,148 | 100.00% |

General election results
| Party | Candidate | Votes | % |
|---|---|---|---|
| Republican | David Cook | 31,565 | 35.82% |
| Republican | Thomas "T.J." Shope (incumbent) | 30,416 | 34.52% |
| Democratic | Carmen Casillas | 26,138 | 29.66% |
| Total votes | | 88,119 | 100.00% |
| Republican hold | | | |
| Republican hold | | | |

=== District 9 ===
Primary election results
| Party | Candidate | Votes | % |
Democratic Party primary results
| Democratic | Randall "Randy" Friese (incumbent) | 14,994 | 42.11% |
| Democratic | Pamela Powers Hannley | 11,630 | 32.67% |
| Democratic | Matt Kopec (incumbent) | 8,979 | 25.22% |
| Total votes | | 35,603 | 100.00% |
Republican Party primary results
| Republican | Ana Henderson | 15,640 | 100.00% |
| Total votes | | 15,640 | 100.00% |

General election results
| Party | Candidate | Votes | % |
|---|---|---|---|
| Democratic | Randall "Randy" Friese (incumbent) | 51,033 | 36.92% |
| Democratic | Pamela Powers Hannley | 45,387 | 32.84% |
| Republican | Ana Henderson | 41,792 | 30.24% |
| Total votes | | 138,212 | 100.00% |
| Democratic hold | | | |
| Democratic hold | | | |

=== District 10 ===
Primary election results
| Party | Candidate | Votes | % |
Democratic Party primary results
| Democratic | Stefanie Mach (incumbent) | 12,674 | 35.93% |
| Democratic | Kirsten Engel | 11,684 | 33.12% |
| Democratic | Courtney Frogge | 10,916 | 30.95% |
| Total votes | | 35,274 | 100.00% |
Republican Party primary results
| Republican | Todd Clodfelter | 17,658 | 100.00% |
| Total votes | | 17,658 | 100.00% |

General election results
| Party | Candidate | Votes | % |
|---|---|---|---|
| Republican | Todd Clodfelter | 45,627 | 33.57% |
| Democratic | Kirsten Engel | 45,530 | 33.50% |
| Democratic | Stefanie Mach (incumbent) | 44,770 | 32.94% |
| Total votes | | 135,927 | 100.00% |
| Republican gain from Democratic | | | |
| Democratic hold | | | |

=== District 11 ===
Primary election results
| Party | Candidate | Votes | % |
Republican Party primary results
| Republican | Mark Finchem (incumbent) | 19,926 | 52.54% |
| Republican | Venden "Vince" Leach (incumbent) | 17,997 | 47.46% |
| Total votes | | 37,923 | 100.00% |
Democratic Party primary results
| Democratic | Corin Hammond | 13,213 | 100.00% |
| Total votes | | 13,213 | 100.00% |

General election results
| Party | Candidate | Votes | % |
|---|---|---|---|
| Republican | Mark Finchem (incumbent) | 52,509 | 36.39% |
| Republican | Venden "Vince" Leach (incumbent) | 49,209 | 34.10% |
| Democratic | Corin Hammond | 42,511 | 29.46% |
| Democratic | Barry McCain | 70 | 0.05% |
| Total votes | | 144,299 | 100.00% |
| Republican hold | | | |
| Republican hold | | | |

=== District 12 ===
Primary election results
| Party | Candidate | Votes | % |
Republican Party primary results
| Republican | Eddie Farnsworth (incumbent) | 16,038 | 38.18% |
| Republican | Travis Grantham | 14,518 | 34.56% |
| Republican | Lacinda Lewis | 11,453 | 27.26% |
| Total votes | | 42,009 | 100.00% |

General election results
| Party | Candidate | Votes | % |
|---|---|---|---|
| Republican | Eddie Farnsworth (incumbent) | 67,225 | 50.44% |
| Republican | Travis Grantham | 66,053 | 49.56% |
| Total votes | | 133,278 | 100.00% |
| Republican hold | | | |
| Republican hold | | | |

=== District 13 ===
Primary election results
| Party | Candidate | Votes | % |
Republican Party primary results
| Republican | Don Shooter | 14,374 | 44.93% |
| Republican | Darin Mitchell (incumbent) | 12,684 | 39.65% |
| Republican | Ray Kouns | 4,931 | 15.41% |
| Total votes | | 31,989 | 100.00% |
Democratic Party primary results
| Democratic | Iisha Graves | 6,944 | 100.00% |
| Total votes | | 6,944 | 100.00% |

General election results
| Party | Candidate | Votes | % |
|---|---|---|---|
| Republican | Don Shooter | 47,748 | 39.15% |
| Republican | Darin Mitchell (incumbent) | 45,699 | 37.47% |
| Democratic | Iisha Graves | 28,500 | 23.37% |
| Total votes | | 121,947 | 100.00% |
| Republican hold | | | |
| Republican hold | | | |

=== District 14 ===
Primary election results
| Party | Candidate | Votes | % |
Republican Party primary results
| Republican | Becky Nutt | 14,162 | 33.25% |
| Republican | Drew John | 12,878 | 30.24% |
| Republican | Anthony Sizer | 9,640 | 22.63% |
| Republican | Dennis Barger | 5,910 | 13.88% |
| Total votes | | 42,590 | 100.00% |
Democratic Party primary results
| Democratic | Mike Holmes | 9,540 | 50.88% |
| Democratic | Jason Lindstrom | 9,211 | 49.12% |
| Total votes | | 18,751 | 100.00% |

General election results
| Party | Candidate | Votes | % |
|---|---|---|---|
| Republican | Drew John | 49,914 | 32.59% |
| Republican | Becky Nutt | 47,578 | 31.06% |
| Democratic | Mike Holmes | 28,161 | 18.38% |
| Democratic | Jason Lindstrom | 27,527 | 17.97% |
| Total votes | | 153,180 | 100.000% |
| Republican hold | | | |
| Republican hold | | | |

=== District 15 ===
Primary election results
| Party | Candidate | Votes | % |
Republican Party primary results
| Republican | Heather Carter (incumbent) | 16,338 | 53.27% |
| Republican | John Allen (incumbent) | 14,332 | 46.73% |
| Total votes | | 30,670 | 100.00% |
Democratic Party primary results
| Democratic | Brandon Dwyer | 8,543 | 100.00% |
| Total votes | | 8,543 | 100.00% |
Libertarian Party primary results
| Libertarian | Kevin McCormick (Note: Despite coming in first place in the Libertarian primary as a write-in candidate, Kevin McCormick did not advance to the general election.) | 57 | 100.00% |
| Total votes | | 57 | 100.00% |

General election results
| Party | Candidate | Votes | % |
|---|---|---|---|
| Republican | Heather Carter (incumbent) | 60,779 | 40.43% |
| Republican | John Allen (incumbent) | 52,832 | 35.14% |
| Democratic | Brandon Dwyer | 36,729 | 24.43% |
| Total votes | | 150,340 | 100.00% |
| Republican hold | | | |
| Republican hold | | | |

=== District 16 ===
Primary election results
| Party | Candidate | Votes | % |
Republican Party primary results
| Republican | Kelly Townsend (incumbent) | 12,188 | 34.17% |
| Republican | Doug Coleman (incumbent) | 10,635 | 29.82% |
| Republican | John Fillmore | 6,838 | 19.17% |
| Republican | Adam Stevens | 6,006 | 16.84% |
| Total votes | | 35,667 | 100.00% |
Democratic Party primary results
| Democratic | Sharon Stinard | 6,357 | 52.81% |
| Democratic | Cara Prior | 5,681 | 47.19% |
| Total votes | | 12,038 | 100.00% |

General election results
| Party | Candidate | Votes | % |
|---|---|---|---|
| Republican | Kelly Townsend (incumbent) | 51,466 | 33.58% |
| Republican | Doug Coleman (incumbent) | 51,312 | 33.48% |
| Democratic | Sharon Stinard | 25,912 | 16.91% |
| Democratic | Cara Prior | 24,581 | 16.04% |
| Total votes | | 153,271 | 100.00% |
| Republican hold | | | |
| Republican hold | | | |

=== District 17 ===
Primary election results
| Party | Candidate | Votes | % |
Republican Party primary results
| Republican | Jeff Weninger (incumbent) | 16,339 | 52.62% |
| Republican | J.D. Mesnard (incumbent) | 14,714 | 47.38% |
| Total votes | | 31,053 | 100.00% |
Democratic Party primary results
| Democratic | Jennifer Pawlik | 9,511 | 100.00% |
| Total votes | | 9,511 | 100.00% |

General election results
| Party | Candidate | Votes | % |
|---|---|---|---|
| Republican | Jeff Weninger (incumbent) | 51,712 | 35.86% |
| Republican | J.D. Mesnard (incumbent) | 48,384 | 33.55% |
| Democratic | Jennifer Pawlik | 44,128 | 30.60% |
| Total votes | | 144,224 | 100.00% |
| Republican hold | | | |
| Republican hold | | | |

=== District 18 ===
Primary election results
| Party | Candidate | Votes | % |
Republican Party primary results
| Republican | Jill Norgaard (incumbent) | 14,925 | 52.66% |
| Republican | Bob Robson (incumbent) | 13,415 | 47.34% |
| Total votes | | 28,340 | 100.00% |
Democratic Party primary results
| Democratic | Denise "Mitzi" Epstein | 13,190 | 100.00% |
| Total votes | | 13,190 | 100.00% |
Green Party primary results
| Green | Linda Macias | 78 | 100.00% |
| Total votes | | 78 | 100.00% |

General election results
| Party | Candidate | Votes | % |
|---|---|---|---|
| Democratic | Denise "Mitzi" Epstein | 52,002 | 30.37% |
| Republican | Jill Norgaard (incumbent) | 50,613 | 29.56% |
| Republican | Bob Robson (incumbent) | 47,569 | 27.78% |
| Green | Linda Macias | 21,039 | 12.29% |
| Total votes | | 171,223 | 100.00% |
| Democratic gain from Republican | | | |
| Republican hold | | | |

=== District 19 ===
Primary election results
| Party | Candidate | Votes | % |
Democratic Party primary results
| Democratic | Diego Espinoza (incumbent) | 5,302 | 50.14% |
| Democratic | Mark Cardenas (incumbent) | 5,272 | 49.86% |
| Total votes | | 10,574 | 100.00% |

General election results
| Party | Candidate | Votes | % |
|---|---|---|---|
| Democratic | Diego Espinoza (incumbent) | 30,693 | 52.96% |
| Democratic | Mark Cardenas (incumbent) | 27,263 | 47.04% |
| Total votes | | 57,956 | 100.00% |
| Democratic hold | | | |
| Democratic hold | | | |

=== District 20 ===
Primary election results
| Party | Candidate | Votes | % |
Republican Party primary results
| Republican | Paul Boyer (incumbent) | 12,895 | 52.31% |
| Republican | Anthony Kern (incumbent) | 11,755 | 47.69% |
| Total votes | | 24,650 | 100.00% |
Democratic Party primary results
| Democratic | Christopher "Chris" Gilfillan | 8,885 | 100.00% |
| Total votes | | 8,885 | 100.00% |

General election results
| Party | Candidate | Votes | % |
|---|---|---|---|
| Republican | Paul Boyer (incumbent) | 39,780 | 34.89% |
| Republican | Anthony Kern (incumbent) | 39,118 | 34.31% |
| Democratic | Christopher "Chris" Gilfillan | 35,117 | 30.80% |
| Total votes | | 114,015 | 100.00% |
| Republican hold | | | |
| Republican hold | | | |

=== District 21 ===
Primary election results
| Party | Candidate | Votes | % |
Republican Party primary results
| Republican | Kevin Payne | 16,150 | 55.27% |
| Republican | Tony Rivero (incumbent) | 13,071 | 44.73% |
| Total votes | | 29,221 | 100.00% |
Democratic Party primary results
| Democratic | Deanna Rasmussen-Lacotta | 9,797 | 100.00% |
| Total votes | | 9,797 | 100.00% |

General election results
| Party | Candidate | Votes | % |
|---|---|---|---|
| Republican | Kevin Payne | 45,639 | 36.84% |
| Republican | Tony Rivero (incumbent) | 44,060 | 35.57% |
| Democratic | Deanna Rasmussen-Lacotta | 34,180 | 27.59% |
| Total votes | | 123,879 | 100.00% |
| Republican hold | | | |
| Republican hold | | | |

=== District 22 ===
Primary election results
| Party | Candidate | Votes | % |
Republican Party primary results
| Republican | David Livingston (incumbent) | 24,178 | 53.99% |
| Republican | Phil Lovas (incumbent) | 20,601 | 46.01% |
| Total votes | | 44,779 | 100.00% |
Democratic Party primary results
| Democratic | Manuel Hernandez | 10,686 | 100.00% |
| Total votes | | 10,686 | 100.00% |

General election results
| Party | Candidate | Votes | % |
|---|---|---|---|
| Republican | David Livingston (incumbent) | 69,251 | 40.37% |
| Republican | Phil Lovas (incumbent) | 64,347 | 37.51% |
| Democratic | Manuel Hernandez | 37,938 | 22.12% |
| Total votes | | 171,536 | 100.00% |
| Republican hold | | | |
| Republican hold | | | |

=== District 23 ===
Primary election results
| Party | Candidate | Votes | % |
Republican Party primary results
| Republican | Jay Lawrence (incumbent) | 21,513 | 51.89% |
| Republican | Michelle Ugenti-Rita (incumbent) | 19,944 | 48.11% |
| Total votes | | 41,457 | 100.00% |
Democratic Party primary results
| Democratic | Tammy Caputi | 11,019 | 100.00% |
| Total votes | | 11,019 | 100.00% |

General election results
| Party | Candidate | Votes | % |
|---|---|---|---|
| Republican | Michelle Ugenti-Rita (incumbent) | 69,758 | 38.56% |
| Republican | Jay Lawrence (incumbent) | 64,903 | 35.87% |
| Democratic | Tammy Caputi | 46,255 | 25.57% |
| Total votes | | 180,916 | 100.00% |
| Republican hold | | | |
| Republican hold | | | |

=== District 24 ===
Primary election results
| Party | Candidate | Votes | % |
Democratic Party primary results
| Democratic | Lela Alston (incumbent) | 10,916 | 51.74% |
| Democratic | Ken Clark (incumbent) | 10,183 | 48.26% |
| Total votes | | 21,099 | 100.00% |
Republican Party primary results
| Republican | David Alger (Note: Despite coming in first place in the Republican primary as a write-in candidate, David Alger did not advance to the general election.) | 85 | 100.00% |
| Total votes | | 85 | 100.00% |

General election results
| Party | Candidate | Votes | % |
|---|---|---|---|
| Democratic | Lela Alston (incumbent) | 43,160 | 50.72% |
| Democratic | Ken Clark (incumbent) | 41,927 | 49.28% |
| Total votes | | 85,087 | 100.00% |
| Democratic hold | | | |
| Democratic hold | | | |

=== District 25 ===
Primary election results
| Party | Candidate | Votes | % |
Republican Party primary results
| Republican | Russell W. "Rusty" Bowers (incumbent) | 16,997 | 40.05% |
| Republican | Michelle Udall | 14,045 | 33.10% |
| Republican | Ross Groen | 11,396 | 26.85% |
| Total votes | | 42,438 | 100.00% |
Democratic Party primary results
| Democratic | Kathleen Rahn | 7,996 | 100.00% |
| Total votes | | 7,996 | 100.00% |

General election results
| Party | Candidate | Votes | % |
|---|---|---|---|
| Republican | Michelle Udall | 55,941 | 40.15% |
| Republican | Russell W. "Rusty" Bowers (incumbent) | 51,160 | 36.72% |
| Democratic | Kathleen Rahn | 32,225 | 23.13% |
| Total votes | | 139,326 | 100.00% |
| Republican hold | | | |
| Republican hold | | | |

=== District 26 ===
Primary election results
| Party | Candidate | Votes | % |
Democratic Party primary results
| Democratic | Athena Salman | 5,007 | 32.10% |
| Democratic | Isela Blanc | 4,648 | 29.80% |
| Democratic | Celeste Plumlee (incumbent) | 3,276 | 21.00% |
| Democratic | Michael Martinez | 2,666 | 17.09% |
| Total votes | | 15,597 | 100.00% |
Republican Party primary results
| Republican | Steven Adkins | 5,807 | 100.00% |
| Total votes | | 5,807 | 100.00% |
Green Party primary results
| Green | Cara Nicole Trujillo | 78 | 100.00% |
| Total votes | | 78 | 100.00% |

General election results
| Party | Candidate | Votes | % |
|---|---|---|---|
| Democratic | Athena Salman | 28,038 | 33.21% |
| Democratic | Isela Blanc | 26,981 | 31.96% |
| Republican | Steven Adkins | 19,469 | 23.06% |
| Green | Cara Nicole Trujillo | 9,941 | 11.77% |
| Total votes | | 84,429 | 100.00% |
| Democratic hold | | | |
| Democratic hold | | | |

=== District 27 ===
Primary election results
| Party | Candidate | Votes | % |
Democratic Party primary results
| Democratic | Rebecca Rios (incumbent) | 8,176 | 45.93% |
| Democratic | Reginald Bolding (incumbent) | 6,213 | 34.90% |
| Democratic | Edward Blackwell | 1,725 | 9.69% |
| Democratic | Dave Braun | 1,686 | 9.47% |
| Total votes | | 17,800 | 100.00% |
Libertarian Party primary results
| Libertarian | Robert Pepiton (Note: Despite coming in first place in the Libertarian primary as a write-in candidate, Robert Pepiton did not advance to the general election.) | 31 | 100.00% |
| Total votes | | 31 | 100.00% |

General election results
| Party | Candidate | Votes | % |
|---|---|---|---|
| Democratic | Rebecca Rios (incumbent) | 37,701 | 57.77% |
| Democratic | Reginald Bolding (incumbent) | 27,559 | 42.23% |
| Total votes | | 65,260 | 100.00% |
| Democratic hold | | | |
| Democratic hold | | | |

=== District 28 ===
Primary election results
| Party | Candidate | Votes | % |
Democratic Party primary results
| Democratic | Kelli Butler | 13,353 | 100.00% |
| Total votes | | 13,353 | 100.00% |
Republican Party primary results
| Republican | Maria Syms | 11,785 | 32.90% |
| Republican | Mary Hamway | 9,264 | 25.87% |
| Republican | Matt Morales | 6,236 | 17.41% |
| Republican | Kenneth R. Bowers | 5,312 | 14.83% |
| Republican | Alberto Gutier III | 3,219 | 8.99% |
| Total votes | | 35,816 | 100.00% |

General election results
| Party | Candidate | Votes | % |
|---|---|---|---|
| Democratic | Kelli Butler | 49,139 | 35.04% |
| Republican | Maria Syms | 46,739 | 33.33% |
| Republican | Mary Hamway | 44,355 | 31.63% |
| Total votes | | 140,233 | 100.00% |
| Democratic hold | | | |
| Republican hold | | | |

=== District 29 ===
Primary election results
| Party | Candidate | Votes | % |
Democratic Party primary results
| Democratic | Richard C. Andrade (incumbent) | 3,847 | 33.77% |
| Democratic | Cesar Chavez | 3,235 | 28.39% |
| Democratic | Rosa Cantú | 2,498 | 21.93% |
| Democratic | Marshall R. Pimentel, Jr. | 1,813 | 15.91% |
| Total votes | | 11,393 | 100.00% |
Republican Party primary results
| Republican | John Wilson | 3,874 | 62.63% |
| Republican | Roberto Carlos Alfáro (Note: The candidate withdrew from the general election.) | 2,312 | 37.37% |
| Total votes | | 6,186 | 100.00% |
Libertarian Party primary results
| Libertarian | Bill Barker (Note: Despite coming in first place in the Libertarian primary as a write-in candidate, Bill Barker did not advance to the general election.) | 16 | 100.00% |
| Total votes | | 16 | 100.00% |

General election results
| Party | Candidate | Votes | % |
|---|---|---|---|
| Democratic | Cesar Chavez | 25,564 | 42.09% |
| Democratic | Richard C. Andrade (incumbent) | 21,257 | 35.00% |
| Republican | John Wilson | 13,920 | 22.92% |
| Total votes | | 60,741 | 100.00% |
| Democratic hold | | | |
| Democratic hold | | | |

=== District 30 ===
Primary election results
| Party | Candidate | Votes | % |
Democratic Party primary results
| Democratic | Otoniel "Tony" Navarrete | 4,121 | 33.90% |
| Democratic | Ray Martinez | 4,089 | 33.64% |
| Democratic | Jonathan Larkin (incumbent) | 3,945 | 32.46% |
| Total votes | | 12,155 | 100.00% |
Republican Party primary results
| Republican | Gary Leon Cox | 5,156 | 100.00% |
| Total votes | | 5,156 | 100.00% |

General election results
| Party | Candidate | Votes | % |
|---|---|---|---|
| Democratic | Ray Martinez | 22,853 | 37.78% |
| Democratic | Otoniel "Tony" Navarrete | 22,810 | 37.71% |
| Republican | Gary Leon Cox | 14,831 | 24.52% |
| Total votes | | 60,494 | 100.00% |
| Democratic hold | | | |
| Democratic hold | | | |

== See also ==
- 2016 United States elections
- 2016 United States presidential election in Arizona
- 2016 United States Senate election in Arizona
- 2016 United States House of Representatives elections in Arizona
- 2016 Arizona elections
- 2016 Arizona Senate election
- 53rd Arizona State Legislature
- Arizona House of Representatives
