= List of representatives and senators of the Arizona Legislature by district, 2013–2023 =

List of representatives and senators of the Arizona Legislature by legislative districts after the 2010 redistricting.

== Background ==
Redistricting in Arizona occurs every 10 years and is conducted by the Arizona Independent Redistricting Commission. In 2010 the commission held 58 business meetings and 43 public hearings in locations all over the state, for a total of over 359 hours in an 11-month period. There were a total of over 5,000 attendees at those meetings, and 2,350 speaking requests were granted. The commission streamed almost every meeting to the internet, allowing another 1,850 distinct viewers to join. After these meetings the AIRC submitted the final Legislative Maps to the Department of Justice on February 28, 2012 for preclearance under the Voting Rights Act. The Justice Department approved the maps on April 26, 2012. The Supreme Court upheld the 2010 redistricting in Harris v. Arizona Independent Redistricting Commission. The first election using the newly drawn districts occurred on November 6, 2012.

A district map can be found on google.

== Arizona – by legislature ==
	Senate		
Affiliation			Total
Affiliation	Republican Party	Democratic Party	Total
Members 13–14	17	13	30
Members start of '15; Members end of '16	17; 18	13; 12	30
Members 17–18	17	13	30
Members 19–20	17	13	30
Members 21–22	16	14	30

	House		
Affiliation			Total
Affiliation	Republican Party	Democratic Party	Total
Members 13–14	36	24	60
Members 15–16	36	24	60
Members 17–18	35	25	60
Members 19–20	31	29	60
Members 21–22	31	29	60

== Senate leadership ==
Legisl.	President of Senate	President Pro Tempore	Majority Leader	Majority Whip	Minority Leader	Minority Asst. Leader	Minority Whip
2013–2014	Andy Biggs (R) 12	Gail Griffin (R) 14	John McComish (R) 14	Adam Driggs (R) 28	Anna Tovar (D) 19	Lynne Pancrazi (D) 4	Steve Gallardo (D) 29
2015–2016	Andy Biggs (R) 12	Sylvia Allen (R) 6	Steve Yarbrough (R) 17	Gail Griffin (R) 14	Katie Hobbs (D) 24	Steve Farley (D) 9	Lupe Contreras (D) 19
2017–2018	Steve Yarbrough (R) 17	Debbie Lesko (R) 21	Kimberly Yee (R) 20	Gail Griffin (R) 14	Katie Hobbs (D) 24	Steve Farley (D) 9	Lupe Contreras (D) 19
2019–2020	Karen Fann (R) 1	Eddie Farnsworth (R) 12	Rick Gray (R) 21	Sonny Borrelli (R) 5	David Bradley (D) 10	Lupe Contreras (D) 19	Jamescita Peshlakai (D) 7
2021–2022	Karen Fann (R) 1	Vince Leach (R) 11	Rick Gray (R) 21	Sonny Borrelli (R) 5	Rebecca Rios (D) 27	Lupe Contreras (D) 19	Martin Quezada (D) 29

== House leadership ==
Legisl.	Speaker of the House	Speaker Pro Tempore	Majority Leader	Majority Whip	Minority Leader	Minority Asst. Leader	Minority Whip
2013–2014	Andy Tobin (R) [1]	J. D. Mesnard (R) 18	David M. Gowan, Sr. (R) 14	Rick Gray (R)	Chad Campbell (D)	Ruben Gallego (D) 27	Bruce Wheeler (D)
2015–2016	David M. Gowan, Sr. (R) 14	Bob Robson (R) 18	Steve Montenegro (R) 13	David Livingston (R) 22	Eric Meyer (D) 28	Bruce Wheeler (D) 10	Rebecca Rios (D) 27
2017–2018	J.D. Mesnard (R) 17	TJ Shope (R) 8	John Allen (R) 15	Kelly Townsend (R) 16	Rebecca Rios (D) 23	Randy Friese (D) 9	Charlene Fernandez (D) 4
2019–2020	Russell Bowers (R) 25	TJ Shope (R) 8	Warren Petersen (R) 12	Becky Nutt (R) 14	Charlene Fernandez (D) 4	Randy Friese (D) 9	Reginald Bolding (D) 27
2021–2022	Russell Bowers (R) 25	Travis Grantham (R) 12	Ben Toma (R) 22	Leo Biasiucci (R) 5	Reginald Bolding (D) 27	Jennifer Longdon (D) 24	Domingo DeGrazia (D) 10

== Arizona – by district ==
† Member was appointed.

=== Arizona – 1st district – Prescott – Yavapai County – New River ===
Legisl.	Senator	P	Info	Representative 1	P	Info	Representative 2	P	Info
2013–2014	Steve Pierce	(R)	1	Karen Fann	(R)	1	Andy Tobin	(R)	1
2015–2016	Steve Pierce	(R)	1	Karen Fann	(R)	1	Noel W. Campbell	(R)	1
2017–2018	Karen Fann	(R)	1	David Stringer	(R)	1	Noel W. Campbell	(R)	1
2019–2020	Karen Fann	(R)	1	David Stringer(2019) †Steve Pierce (2019–2020)	(R)	1	Noel W. Campbell	(R)	1
2021–2022	Karen Fann	(R)		Quang Nguyen	(R)	1	Judy Burges	(R)	1

=== Arizona – 2nd district – Green Valley – Tucson South East ===
Legisl.	Senator	P	Info	Representative 1	P	Info	Representative 2	P	Info
2013–2014	Linda Lopez (2013–2014) †Andrea Dalessandro (2014)	(D)	2	Andrea Dalessandro (2013–2014) †Demion Clinco (2014)	(D)		Rosanna Gabaldon	(D)	
2015–2016	Andrea Dalessandro	(D)		Rosanna Gabaldon	(D)		J. Christopher Ackerley	(R)	2
2017–2018	Andrea Dalessandro	(D)		Rosanna Gabaldon	(D)		Daniel Hernández Jr.	(D)	
2019–2020	Andrea Dalessandro	(D)		Rosanna Gabaldon	(D)		Daniel Hernández Jr.	(D)	
2021–2022	Rosanna Gabaldon	(D)		Andrea Dalessandro	(D)		Daniel Hernández Jr.	(D)	

=== Arizona – 3rd district – Tucson West – Three Points ===
Legisl.	Senator	P	Info	Representative 1	P	Info	Representative 2	P	Info
2013–2014	Olivia Cajero Bedford	(D)		Sally Ann Gonzales	(D)		Macario Saldate	(D)	
2015–2016	Olivia Cajero Bedford	(D)		Sally Ann Gonzales	(D)		Macario Saldate	(D)	
2017–2018	Olivia Cajero Bedford	(D)		Sally Ann Gonzales	(D)		Macario Saldate	(D)	
2019–2020	Sally Ann Gonzales	(D)		Alma Hernandez	(D)		Andrés Cano	(D)	
2021–2022	Sally Ann Gonzales	(D)		Alma Hernandez	(D)		Andrés Cano	(D)	

=== Arizona – 4th district – Maricopa County SouthWest – Yuma ===
Legisl.	Senator	P	Info	Representative 1	P	Info	Representative 2	P	Info
2013–2014	Lynne Pancrazi	(D)		Juan Carlos Escamilla	(D)		Lisa Otondo	(D)	
2015–2016	Lynne Pancrazi	(D)		Charlene Fernandez	(D)		Lisa Otondo	(D)	
2017–2018	Lisa Otondo	(D)		Charlene Fernandez	(D)		Jesus Rubalcava (2017) †Geraldine Peten (2017–2018)	(D)	
2019–2020	Lisa Otondo	(D)		Charlene Fernandez	(D)		Geraldine Peten	(D)	
2021–2022	Lisa Otondo	(D)		Charlene Fernandez (2021) †Brian Fernandez (2021–2022)	(D)		Joel John	(R)	

=== Arizona – 5th district – Mohave County – La Paz County ===
Legisl.	Senator	P	Info	Representative 1	P	Info	Representative 2	P	Info
2013–2014	Kelli Ward	(R)		Sonny Borrelli	(R)		Doris Goodale	(R)	
2015–2016	Kelli Ward (2015) †Sue Donahue (2015–2016)	(R)		Sonny Borrelli	(R)		Regina Cobb	(R)	
2017–2018	Sonny Borrelli	(R)		Paul Mosley	(R)		Regina Cobb	(R)	
2019–2020	Sonny Borrelli	(R)		Regina Cobb	(R)		Leo Biasiucci	(R)	
2021–2022	Sonny Borrelli	(R)		Regina Cobb	(R)		Leo Biasiucci	(R)	

=== Arizona – 6th district – Flagstaff – Coconino County ===
Legisl.	Senator	P	Info	Representative 1	P	Info	Representative 2	P	Info
2013–2014	Chester Crandell (Note: Chester Crandell died in office on August 4, 2014, his wife Alice was appointed as an interim replacement and Sylvia Allen was selected to replace Crandell for the election, which she subsequently won.)	(R)	6	Brenda Barton	(R)		Bob Thorpe	(R)	
2015–2016	Sylvia Allen	(R)		Brenda Barton	(R)		Bob Thorpe	(R)	
2017–2018	Sylvia Allen	(R)		Brenda Barton	(R)		Bob Thorpe	(R)	
2019–2020	Sylvia Allen	(R)		Walter Blackman	(R)		Bob Thorpe	(R)	
2021–2022	Wendy Rogers	(R)		Walter Blackman	(R)		Brenda Barton	(R)	

=== Arizona – 7th district – Apache County – Navajo County ===
Legisl.	Senator	P	Info	Representative 1	P	Info	Representative 2	P	Info
2013–2014	Jack Jackson, Jr. (2013) †Carlyle Begay (2013–2014)	(D)	7	Albert Hale	(D)		Jamescita Peshlakai	(D)	
2015–2016	Carlyle Begay (Note: On November 23, 2015, Begay switched from Democrat to the Republican.)	(R)	7	Albert Hale	(D)		Jennifer D. Benally	(D)	
2017–2018	Jamescita Peshlakai	(D)		Eric Descheenie	(D)		Wenona Benally	(D)	
2019–2020	Jamescita Peshlakai	(D)		Arlando Teller	(D)		Myron Tsosie	(D)	
2021–2022	Jamescita Peshlakai	(D)		Arlando Teller †Jasmine Blackwater-Nygren (2021)	(D)		Myron Tsosie	(D)	

=== Arizona – 8th district – Pinal County – San Tan Valley ===
Legisl.	Senator	P	Info	Representative 1	P	Info	Representative 2	P	Info
2013–2014	Barbara McGuire	(D)	8	TJ Shope	(R)	8	Frank Pratt	(R)	
2015–2016	Barbara McGuire	(D)		TJ Shope	(R)	8	Frank Pratt	(R)	
2017–2018	Frank Pratt	(R)		TJ Shope	(R)	8	David Cook	(R)	
2019–2020	Frank Pratt	(R)		TJ Shope	(R)	8	David Cook	(R)	
2021–2022	TJ Shope	(R)		David Cook	(R)		Frank Pratt †Neal Carter (2021)	(R)	

=== Arizona – 9th district – Tucson North ===
Legisl.	Senator	P	Info	Representative 1	P	Info	Representative 2	P	Info
2013–2014	Steve Farley	(D)	9	Victoria Steele	(D)		Ethan Orr	(R)	
2015–2016	Steve Farley	(D)	9	Victoria Steele (2015–2016) †Matt Kopec (2016)	(D)		Randall Friese	(D)	
2017–2018	Steve Farley	(D)	9	Pamela Hannley	(D)		Randall Friese	(D)	
2019–2020	Victoria Steele	(D)		Pamela Hannley	(D)		Randall Friese	(D)	
2021–2022	Victoria Steele	(D)		Pamela Hannley	(D)		Randall Friese †Christopher Mathis (2021)	(D)	

=== Arizona – 10th district – Pima County East – Tanque Verde ===
Legisl.	Senator	P	Info	Representative 1	P	Info	Representative 2	P	Info
2013–2015	David Bradley	(D)	10	Stefanie Mach	(D)		Bruce Wheeler	(D)	
2015–2016	David Bradley	(D)	10	Stefanie Mach	(D)		Bruce Wheeler	(D)	
2017–2018	David Bradley	(D)	10	Kirsten Engel	(D)		Todd Clodfelter	(R)	
2019–2020	David Bradley	(D)		Kirsten Engel	(D)		Domingo DeGrazia	(D)	
2021–2022	Kirsten Engel †Stephanie Hamilton (2021)	(D)		Domingo DeGrazia	(D)		Stephanie Hamilton †Morgan Abraham (2021)	(D)	

=== Arizona – 11th district – Maricopa – Oro Valley ===
Legisl.	Senator	P	Info	Representative 1	P	Info	Representative 2	P	Info
2013–2014	Al Melvin	(R)		Adam Kwasman	(R)		Steve Smith	(R)	
2015–2016	Steve Smith	(R)		Mark Finchem	(R)		Vince Leach	(R)	
2017–2018	Steve Smith	(R)		Mark Finchem	(R)		Vince Leach	(R)	
2019–2020	Vince Leach	(R)		Mark Finchem	(R)		Bret Roberts	(R)	
2021–2022	Vince Leach	(R)		Mark Finchem	(R)		Bret Roberts †Teresa Martinez (2021)	(R)	

=== Arizona – 12th district – Gilbert–Queen Creek ===
Legisl.	Senator	P	Info	Representative 1	P	Info	Representative 2	P	Info
2013–2014	Andy Biggs	(R)		Eddie Farnsworth	(R)		Warren Petersen	(R)	
2015–2016	Andy Biggs	(R)		Eddie Farnsworth	(R)		Warren Petersen	(R)	
2017–2018	Warren Petersen	(R)		Eddie Farnsworth	(R)		Travis Grantham	(R)	
2019–2020	Eddie Farnsworth	(R)		Travis Grantham	(R)		Warren Petersen	(R)	
2021–2022	Warren Petersen	(R)		Travis Grantham	(R)		Jake Hoffman	(R)	

=== Arizona – 13th district – Maricopa County South-West – Yuma County ===
Legisl.	Senator	P	Info	Representative 1	P	Info	Representative 2	P	Info
2013–2014	Don Shooter	(R)		Darin Mitchell	(R)		Steve Montenegro	(R)	
2015–2016	Don Shooter	(R)		Darin Mitchell	(R)		Steve Montenegro	(R)	
2017–2018	Steve Montenegro (2017) †Sine Kerr (2018)	(R)		Darin Mitchell	(R)		Don Shooter †Tim Dunn (2018)	(R)	
2019–2020	Sine Kerr	(R)		Tim Dunn	(R)		Joanne Osborne	(R)	
2021–2022	Sine Kerr	(R)		Tim Dunn	(R)		Joanne Osborne	(R)	

=== Arizona – 14th district – Cochise County – Greenlee County ===
Legisl.	Senator	P	Info	Representative 1	P	Info	Representative 2	P	Info
2013–2014	Gail Griffin	(R)		David Gowan	(R)		David Stevens	(R)	
2015–2016	Gail Griffin	(R)		David Gowan	(R)		David Stevens	(R)	
2017–2018	Gail Griffin	(R)		Becky Nutt	(R)		Drew John	(R)	
2019–2020	David Gowan	(R)		Becky Nutt	(R)		Gail Griffin	(R)	
2021–2022	David Gowan	(R)		Becky Nutt(2021) †Lupe Diaz (2021–2022)	(R)		Gail Griffin	(R)	

=== Arizona – 15th district – Phoenix North-East – Deer Valley ===
Legisl.	Senator	P	Info	Representative 1	P	Info	Representative 2	P	Info
2013–2014	Nancy Barto	(R)		John Allen	(R)		Heather Carter	(R)	
2015–2016	Nancy Barto	(R)		John Allen	(R)		Heather Carter	(R)	
2017–2018	Nancy Barto	(R)		John Allen	(R)		Heather Carter	(R)	
2019–2020	Heather Carter	(R)		John Allen	(R)		Nancy Barto	(R)	
2021–2022	Nancy Barto	(R)		Justin Wilmeth	(R)		Steve Kaiser	(R)	

=== Arizona – 16th district – Apache Junction – Mesa East ===
Legisl.	Senator	P	Info	Representative 1	P	Info	Representative 2	P	Info
2013–2014	Rich Crandall (2013) †Dave Farnsworth (2013–2014)	(R)		Doug Coleman	(R)		Kelly Townsend	(R)	
2015–2016	Dave Farnsworth	(R)		Doug Coleman	(R)		Kelly Townsend	(R)	
2017–2018	Dave Farnsworth	(R)		Doug Coleman	(R)		Kelly Townsend	(R)	
2019–2020	Dave Farnsworth	(R)		Kelly Townsend	(R)		John Fillmore	(R)	
2021–2022	Kelly Townsend	(R)		Jacqueline Parker	(R)		John Fillmore	(R)	

=== Arizona – 17th district – Chandler – Sun Lakes ===
Legisl.	Senator	P	Info	Representative 1	P	Info	Representative 2	P	Info
2013–2014	Steven B. Yarbrough	(R)		Tom Forese	(R)		J.D. Mesnard	(R)	
2015–2016	Steven B. Yarbrough	(R)		Jeff Weninger	(R)		J.D. Mesnard	(R)	
2017–2018	Steven B. Yarbrough	(R)		Jeff Weninger	(R)		J.D. Mesnard	(R)	
2019–2020	J.D. Mesnard	(R)		Jeff Weninger	(R)		Jennifer Pawlik	(D)	
2021–2022	J.D. Mesnard	(R)		Jeff Weninger	(R)		Jennifer Pawlik	(D)	

=== Arizona – 18th district – Mesa South-West – Ahwatukee ===
Legisl.	Senator	P	Info	Representative 1	P	Info	Representative 2	P	Info
2013–2014	John McComish	(R)		Jeff Dial	(R)		Bob Robson	(R)	
2015–2016	Jeff Dial	(R)		Jill Norgaard	(R)		Bob Robson	(R)	
2017–2018	Sean Bowie	(D)	18	Jill Norgaard	(R)		Denise Epstein	(D)	
2019–2020	Sean Bowie	(D)		Denise Epstein	(D)		Jennifer Jermaine	(D)	
2021–2022	Sean Bowie	(D)		Denise Epstein	(D)		Jennifer Jermaine	(D)	

=== Arizona – 19th district – Avondale – Tolleson ===
Legisl.	Senator	P	Info	Representative 1	P	Info	Representative 2	P	Info
2013–2014	Anna Tovar	(D)		Mark Cardenas	(D)		Lupe Contreras	(D)	
2015–2016	Lupe Contreras	(D)		Diego Espinoza	(D)		Mark Cardenas	(D)	
2017–2018	Lupe Contreras	(D)		Diego Espinoza	(D)		Mark Cardenas	(D)	
2019–2020	Lupe Contreras	(D)		Diego Espinoza	(D)		Lorenzo Sierra	(D)	
2021–2022	Lupe Contreras	(D)		Diego Espinoza	(D)		Lorenzo Sierra	(D)	

=== Arizona – 20th district – Phoenix North-West – Moon Valley ===
Legisl.	Senator	P	Info	Representative 1	P	Info	Representative 2	P	Info
2013–2014	Kimberly Yee	(R)		Paul Boyer	(R)		Carl Seel	(R)	
2015–2016	Kimberly Yee	(R)		Paul Boyer	(R)		Anthony Kern	(R)	
2017–2018	Kimberly Yee	(R)		Paul Boyer	(R)		Anthony Kern	(R)	
2019–2020	Paul Boyer	(R)		Anthony Kern	(R)		Shawnna Bolick	(R)	
2021–2022	Paul Boyer	(R)		Judy Schwiebert	(D)		Shawnna Bolick	(R)	

=== Arizona – 21st district – El Mirage – Peoria – Sun City ===
Legisl.	Senator	P	Info	Representative 1	P	Info	Representative 2	P	Info
2013–2014	Rick Murphy	(R)		Rick Gray	(R)		Debbie Lesko	(R)	
2015–2016	Debbie Lesko	(R)		Rick Gray	(R)		Tony Rivero	(R)	
2017–2018	Debbie Lesko (2017–2018) †Rick Gray (2018)	(R)		Tony Rivero	(R)		Kevin Payne	(R)	
2019–2020	Rick Gray	(R)		Tony Rivero	(R)		Kevin Payne	(R)	
2021–2022	Rick Gray	(R)		Beverly Pingerelli	(R)		Kevin Payne	(R)	

=== Arizona – 22nd district – Surprise – Maricopa County North-Central ===
Legisl.	Senator	P	Info	Representative 1	P	Info	Representative 2	P	Info
2013–2014	Judy Burges	(R)		David Livingston	(R)		Phil Lovas	(R)	
2015–2016	Judy Burges	(R)		David Livingston	(R)		Phil Lovas	(R)	
2017–2018	Judy Burges	(R)		David Livingston	(R)		Phil Lovas (2017) †Ben Toma (2017–2018)	(R)	
2019–2020	David Livingston	(R)		Ben Toma	(R)		Frank Carroll	(R)	
2021–2022	David Livingston	(R)		Ben Toma	(R)		Frank Carroll	(R)	

=== Arizona – 23rd district – Fountain Hills – Scottsdale ===
Legisl.	Senator	P	Info	Representative 1	P	Info	Representative 2	P	Info
2013–2014	Michele Reagan	(R)		John Kavanagh	(R)		Michelle Ugenti	(R)	
2015–2016	John Kavanagh	(R)		Jay Lawrence	(R)		Michelle Ugenti	(R)	
2017–2018	John Kavanagh	(R)		Jay Lawrence	(R)		Michelle Ugenti	(R)	
2019–2020	Michelle Ugenti	(R)		Jay Lawrence	(R)		John Kavanagh	(R)	
2021–2022	Michelle Ugenti	(R)		Joseph Chaplik	(R)		John Kavanagh	(R)	

=== Arizona – 24th district – Phoenix East – Scottsdale South ===
Legisl.	Senator	P	Info	Representative 1	P	Info	Representative 2	P	Info
2013–2014	Katie Hobbs	(D)		Lela Alston	(D)		Chad Campbell	(D)	
2015–2016	Katie Hobbs	(D)		Lela Alston	(D)		Ken Clark	(D)	
2017–2018	Katie Hobbs	(D)		Lela Alston	(D)		Ken Clark	(D)	
2019–2020	Lela Alston	(D)		Jennifer Longdon	(D)		Amish Shah	(D)	
2021–2022	Lela Alston	(D)		Jennifer Longdon	(D)		Amish Shah	(D)	

=== Arizona – 25th district – Mesa ===
Legisl.	Senator	P	Info	Representative 1	P	Info	Representative 2	P	Info
2013–2014	Bob Worsley	(R)		Justin Olson	(R)		Justin Pierce	(R)	
2015–2016	Bob Worsley	(R)		Justin Olson	(R)		Russell Bowers	(R)	
2017–2018	Bob Worsley	(R)		Michelle Udall	(R)		Russell Bowers	(R)	
2019–2020	Tyler Pace	(R)		Michelle Udall	(R)		Russell Bowers	(R)	
2020–2022	Tyler Pace	(R)		Michelle Udall	(R)		Russell Bowers	(R)	

=== Arizona – 26th district – Tempe – Mesa ===
Legisl.	Senator	P	Info	Representative 1	P	Info	Representative 2	P	Info
2013–2014	Ed Ableser	(D)		Andrew Sherwood	(D)		Juan Mendez	(D)	
2015–2016	Ed Ableser (2015) †Andrew Sherwood (2015–2016)	(D)		Andrew Sherwood (2015) †Celeste Plumlee (2015–2016)	(D)		Juan Mendez	(D)	
2017–2018	Juan Mendez	(D)		Isela Blanc	(D)		Athena Salman	(D)	
2019–2020	Juan Mendez	(D)		Isela Blanc	(D)		Athena Salman	(D)	
2021–2022	Juan Mendez	(D)		Melody Hernandez	(D)		Athena Salman	(D)	

=== Arizona – 27th district – Phoenix Downtown – Laveen – Guadalupe ===
Legisl.	Senator	P	Info	Representative 1	P	Info	Representative 2	P	Info
2013–2014	Leah Landrum-Taylor	(D)	27	Catherine Miranda	(D)		Ruben Gallego	(D)	
2015–2016	Catherine Miranda	(D)		Reginald Bolding	(D)		Rebecca Rios	(D)	
2017–2018	Catherine Miranda	(D)		Reginald Bolding	(D)		Rebecca Rios	(D)	
2019–2020	Rebecca Rios	(D)		Reginald Bolding	(D)		Diego Rodriguez	(D)	
2021–2022	Rebecca Rios	(D)		Reginald Bolding	(D)		Diego Rodriguez (2021) †Marcelino Quiñonez	(D)	

=== Arizona – 28th district – Phoenix East – Paradise Valley ===
Legisl.	Senator	P	Info	Representative 1	P	Info	Representative 2	P	Info
2013–2014	Adam Driggs	(R)		Kate Brophy McGee	(R)		Eric Meyer	(D)	
2015–2016	Adam Driggs	(R)		Kate Brophy McGee	(R)		Eric Meyer	(D)	
2017–2018	Kate Brophy McGee	(R)		Maria Syms	(R)		Kelli Butler	(D)	
2019–2020	Kate Brophy McGee	(R)		Kelli Butler	(D)		Aaron Lieberman	(D)	
2021–2022	Christine Marsh	(D)		Kelli Butler	(D)		Aaron Lieberman (2021) †Sarah Liguori (2021–2022)	(D)	

=== Arizona – 29th district – Glendale – Maryvale ===
Legisl.	Senator	P	Info	Representative 1	P	Info	Representative 2	P	Info
2013–2014	Steve Gallardo	(D)	29	Lydia Hernandez	(D)		Martín Quezada	(D)	
2015–2016	Martín Quezada	(D)		Richard C. Andrade	(D)		Ceci Velasquez	(D)	
2017–2018	Martín Quezada	(D)		Richard C. Andrade	(D)		Cesar Chavez	(D)	
2019–2020	Martín Quezada	(D)		Richard C. Andrade	(D)		Cesar Chavez	(D)	
2021–2022	Martín Quezada	(D)		Richard C. Andrade	(D)		Cesar Chavez	(D)	

=== Arizona – 30th district – Glendale – Phoenix West ===
Legisl.	Senator	P	Info	Representative 1	P	Info	Representative 2	P	Info
2013–2014	Robert Meza	(D)		Jonathan Larkin	(D)		Debbie McCune Davis	(D)	
2015–2016	Robert Meza	(D)		Jonathan Larkin	(D)		Debbie McCune Davis	(D)	
2017–2018	Robert Meza	(D)		Ray Martinez	(D)		Tony Navarrete	(D)	
2019–2020	Tony Navarrete	(D)		Robert Meza	(D)		Raquel Terán	(D)	
2021–2022	Tony Navarrete (2021) †Raquel Terán (2021–2022)	(D)		Robert Meza	(D)		Raquel Terán (2021) †Christian Solorio (2021–2022)	(D)	

== See also ==
- List of representatives and senators of the Arizona Legislature by district, 2003–2013
- List of Arizona legislative districts
