= 53rd Arizona State Legislature =

Session of the Arizona Legislature

←	52nd	54th	→
- Arizona State Capitol (2014)

Overview
- Legislative body: Arizona State Legislature
- Jurisdiction: Arizona, United States
- Term: January 1, 2017 – December 31, 2018

Senate
- Members: 30
- President: Lieutenant Governor Steve Yarbrough
- Temporary President: Debbie Lesko
- Party control: Republican (17-13)

House of Representatives
- Members: 60
- Speaker: J.D. Mesnard
- Party control: Republican (35-25)

Sessions
- 1st: January 9 – May 10, 2017
- 2nd: January 8 – May 4, 2018

Special sessions
- 1st: January 22 – January 25, 2018

The 53rd Arizona State Legislature, consisting of the Arizona State Senate and the Arizona House of Representatives, was constituted in Phoenix from January 1, 2017, to December 31, 2018, during the second two years of Doug Ducey's first full term in office. Both the Senate and the House membership remained constant at 30 and 60, respectively. Democrats gained one seat in the Senate, leaving the Republicans with a 17–13 majority. Republicans also maintained an 35–25 majority in the House after losing one seat to the Democrats.

== Sessions ==
The Legislature met for two regular sessions at the State Capitol in Phoenix. The first opened on January 9, 2017, and adjourned on May 10, while the Second Regular Session convened on January 8, 2018, and adjourned sine die on May 4.

There was one Special Session, which was convened on January 22, 2018, and adjourned on January 25.

== State Senate ==
=== Members ===
The asterisk (*) denotes members of the previous Legislature who continued in office as members of this Legislature.

District	Senator	Party	Notes
1	Karen Fann	Republican	
2	Andrea Dalessandro*	Democrat	
3	Olivia Cajero Bedford*	Democrat	
4	Lisa Otondo	Democrat	
5	Sonny Borrelli	Republican	
6	Sylvia Allen*	Republican	
7	Jamescita Peshlakai	Democrat	
8	Frank Pratt	Republican	
9	Steve Farley*	Democrat	
10	David Bradley*	Democrat	
11	Steve Smith*	Republican	
12	Warren Petersen	Republican	
13	Steve Montenegro	Republican	Resigned December 15, 2017
13	Sine Kerr	Republican	Appointed January 4, 2018
14	Gail Griffin*	Republican	
15	Nancy Barto*	Republican	
16	David C. Farnsworth*	Republican	
17	Steve Yarbrough*	Republican	
18	Sean Bowie	Democrat	
19	Lupe Contreras*	Democrat	
20	Kimberly Yee*	Republican	
21	Debbie Lesko*	Republican	Resigned January 8, 2018
21	Rick Gray	Republican	Appointed January 27, 2018
22	Judy M. Burges*	Republican	
23	John Kavanagh*	Republican	
24	Katie Hobbs*	Democrat	
25	Bob Worsley*	Republican	
26	Juan Mendez	Democrat	
27	Catherine Miranda*	Democrat	
28	Kate Brophy McGee	Republican	
29	Martin Quezada*	Democrat	
30	Robert Meza*	Democrat	

== House of Representatives ==
=== Members ===
The asterisk (*) denotes members of the previous Legislature who continued in office as members of this Legislature.

District	Representative	Party	Notes
1	David Stringer	Republican	
1	Noel W. Campbell*	Republican	
2	Daniel Hernandez Jr.	Democrat	
2	Rosanna Gabaldon*	Democrat	
3	Sally Ann Gonzales*	Democrat	
3	Macario Saldate*	Democrat	
4	Charlene Fernandez*	Democrat	
4	Jesus Rubalcava	Democrat	Resigned July 19, 2017
4	Geraldine Peten	Democrat	Appointed August 16, 2017
5	Paul Mosley	Republican	
5	Regina Cobb*	Republican	
6	Brenda Barton*	Republican	
6	Bob Thorpe*	Republican	
7	Eric Descheenie	Democrat	
7	Wenona Benally	Democrat	
8	David Cook	Republican	
8	T.J. Shope*	Republican	
9	Pamela Hannley	Democrat	
9	Randall Friese*	Democrat	
10	Kirsten Engel	Democrat	
10	Todd Clodfelter	Republican	
11	Mark Finchem*	Republican	
11	Vince Leach*	Republican	
12	Eddie Farnsworth*	Republican	
12	Travis Grantham	Republican	
13	Darin Mitchell*	Republican	
13	Don Shooter	Republican	Expelled on February 1, 2018
13	Tim Dunn	Republican	Appointed on February 13, 2018
14	Becky Nutt	Republican	
14	Drew John	Republican	
15	John Allen*	Republican	
15	Heather Carter*	Republican	
16	Doug Coleman*	Republican	
16	Kelly Townsend*	Republican	
17	Jeff Weninger*	Republican	
17	J. D. Mesnard*	Republican	
18	Jill Norgaard*	Republican	
18	Denise Epstein	Democrat	
19	Mark A. Cardenas*	Democrat	
19	Diego Espinoza*	Democrat	
20	Paul Boyer*	Republican	
20	Anthony Kern*	Republican	
21	Kevin Payne	Republican	
21	Tony Rivero*	Republican	
22	David Livingston*	Republican	
22	Phil Lovas*	Republican	Resigned April 17, 2017
22	Ben Toma	Republican	Appointed April 26, 2017
23	Jay Lawrence*	Republican	
23	Michelle Ugenti*	Republican	
24	Lela Alston*	Democrat	
24	Ken Clark*	Democrat	
25	Michelle Udall	Republican	
25	Russell Bowers*	Republican	
26	Isela Blanc	Democrat	
26	Athena Salman	Democrat	
27	Reginald Bolding*	Democrat	
27	Rebecca Rios*	Democrat	
28	Maria Syms	Republican	
28	Kelli Butler	Democrat	
29	Richard C. Andrade*	Democrat	
29	Cesar Chavez	Democrat	
30	Ray Martinez	Democrat	
30	Tony Navarrete	Democrat	
