= 2016 Arizona Senate election =

- November 8, 2016

All 30 seats of the Arizona Senate 16 seats needed for a majority
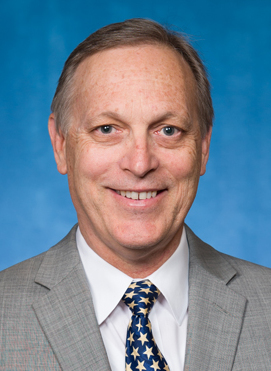

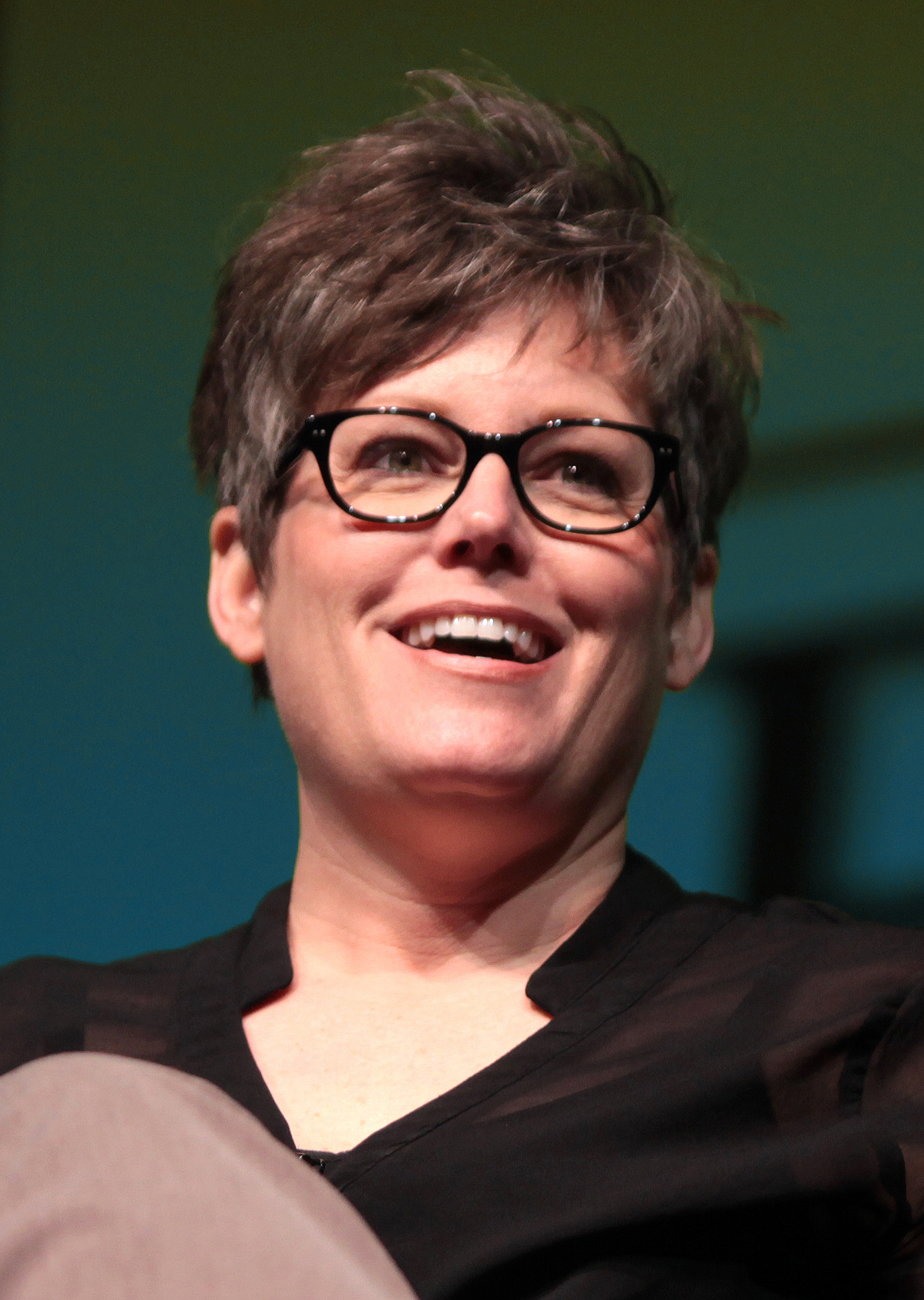
	Majority party	Minority party
Leader	Andy Biggs (retired)	Katie Hobbs
Party	Republican	Democratic
Leader's seat	12th	24th
Last election	17	13
Seats before	18 (Note: Senator Carlyle Begay changed political party affiliation on November 23, 2015, from Democrat to Republican.)	12
Seats after	17	13
Seat change	▼1	▲1
Popular vote	1,184,066	995,317
Percentage	53.83%	45.25%
Swing	▼1.96%	▲5.12%
- Results: Democratic hold Democratic gain Republican hold Republican gain
Senate President before election
Andy Biggs
Republican
Elected Senate President
Steve Yarbrough
Republican

The 2016 Arizona Senate election was held on November 8, 2016. Voters elected members of the Arizona Senate in all 30 of the state's legislative districts to serve a two-year term. Primary elections were held on August 30, 2016.

Prior to the elections, the Republicans held a majority of 18 seats over the Democrats' 12 seats. Note that, following the 2014 Arizona Senate election, Republicans held only 17 seats; however, Senator Carlyle Begay switched parties during his term in office, which increased Republicans from 17 to 18 in the Arizona Senate by election day in 2016.

Following the election, Republicans maintained control of the chamber with 17 Republicans to 13 Democrats, a net gain of one seat for Democrats.

The newly elected senators served in the 53rd Arizona State Legislature.

== Retiring Incumbents ==
=== Democrats ===
1. District 4: Lynne Pancrazi
2. District 26: Andrew Sherwood (Note: Democrat Andrew Sherwood was sworn in November 5, 2015 to replace Democratic Senator Ed Ableser who resigned on September 30, 2015.)

=== Republicans ===
1. District 1: Steve Pierce
2. District 5: Sue Donahue (Note: Republican Sue Donahue was sworn in on January 7, 2016 to replace Republican Senator Kelli Ward who resigned on December 15, 2015.)
3. District 7: Carlyle W. Begay
4. District 12: Andy Biggs
5. District 13: Don Shooter
6. District 28: Adam Driggs

== Incumbent Defeated in Primary Elections ==
=== Republican ===
1. District 18: Jeff Dial

== Incumbent Defeated in General Elections ==
=== Democrat ===
1. District 8: Barbara McGuire

== Predictions ==
Source	Ranking	As of
Governing	Lean R	October 12, 2016

== Summary of Results by Arizona State Legislative District ==
District	Incumbent	Party	Elected Senator	Outcome
1st	Steve Pierce	Rep	Karen Fann	Rep Hold
2nd	Andrea Dalessandro	Dem	Andrea Dalessandro	Dem Hold
3rd	Olivia Cajero Bedford	Dem	Olivia Cajero Bedford	Dem Hold
4th	Lynne Pancrazi	Dem	Lisa Otondo	Dem Hold
5th	Sue Donahue	Rep	Sonny Borrelli	Rep Hold
6th	Sylvia Tenney Allen	Rep	Sylvia Tenney Allen	Rep Hold
7th	Carlyle W. Begay	Rep	Jamescita Peshlakai	Dem Gain
8th	Barbara McGuire	Dem	Frank Pratt	Rep Gain
9th	Steve Farley	Dem	Steve Farley	Dem Hold
10th	David Bradley	Dem	David Bradley	Dem Hold
11th	Steve Smith	Rep	Steve Smith	Rep Hold
12th	Andy Biggs	Rep	Warren Petersen	Rep Hold
13th	Don Shooter	Rep	Steve Montenegro (Note: Republican Sine Kerr was sworn in on January 8, 2018 to replace Republican Senator Steve Montenegro who resigned on December 15, 2017.)	Rep Hold
14th	Gail Griffin	Rep	Gail Griffin	Rep Hold
15th	Nancy Barto	Rep	Nancy Barto	Rep Hold
16th	David Christian Farnsworth	Rep	David Christian Farnsworth	Rep Hold
17th	Steve Yarbrough	Rep	Steve Yarbrough	Rep Hold
18th	Jeff Dial	Rep	Sean Bowie	Dem Gain
19th	Lupe Chavira Contreras	Dem	Lupe Chavira Contreras	Dem Hold
20th	Kimberly Yee	Rep	Kimberly Yee	Rep Hold
21st	Debbie Lesko	Rep	Debbie Lesko (Note: Republican Rick Gray was sworn in on January 19, 2018 to replace Republican Senator Debbie Lesko who resigned on January 8, 201.)	Rep Hold
22nd	Judy Burges	Rep	Judy Burges	Rep Hold
23rd	John Kavanagh	Rep	John Kavanagh	Rep Hold
24th	Katie Hobbs	Dem	Katie Hobbs	Dem Hold
25th	Bob Worsley	Rep	Bob Worsley	Rep Hold
26th	Andrew Sherwood	Dem	Juan Jose Mendez	Dem Hold
27th	Catherine Miranda	Dem	Catherine Miranda	Dem Hold
28th	Adam Driggs	Rep	Kate Brophy McGee	Rep Hold
29th	Martín Quezada	Dem	Martín Quezada	Dem Hold
30th	Robert Meza	Dem	Robert Meza	Dem Hold

== Detailed Results ==
=== District 1 ===
Republican primary results
Party	Candidate	Votes	%
Republican	Karen Fann	32,746	100.00%
Total votes		32,746	100.00%

General election results
Party	Candidate	Votes	%
Republican	Karen Fann	87,011	100.00%
Total votes		87,011	100.00%
Republican hold			

=== District 2 ===
Democratic primary results
Party	Candidate	Votes	%
Democratic	Andrea Dalessandro (incumbent)	13,765	100.00%
Total votes		13,765	100.00%

Republican primary results
Party	Candidate	Votes	%
Republican	Shelley Kais	10,778	100.00%
Total votes		10,778	100.00%

General election results
Party	Candidate	Votes	%
Democratic	Andrea Dalessandro (incumbent)	39,693	59.46%
Republican	Shelley Kais	27,066	40.54%
Total votes		66,759	100.00%
Democratic hold			

=== District 3 ===
Democratic primary results
Party	Candidate	Votes	%
Democratic	Olivia Cajero Bedford (incumbent)	14,578	100.00%
Total votes		14,578	100.00%

General election results
Party	Candidate	Votes	%
Democratic	Olivia Cajero Bedford (incumbent)	48,887	100.00%
Total votes		48,887	100.00%
Democratic hold			

=== District 4 ===
Democratic primary results
Party	Candidate	Votes	%
Democratic	Lisa Otondo	8,070	100.00%
Total votes		8,070	100.00%

General election results
Party	Candidate	Votes	%
Democratic	Lisa Otondo	37,668	100.00%
Total votes		37,668	100.00%
Democratic hold			

=== District 5 ===
Republican primary results
Party	Candidate	Votes	%
Republican	Sonny Borrelli	13,911	52.67%
Republican	Ron Gould	12,503	47.33%
Total votes		26,414	100.00%

General election results
Party	Candidate	Votes	%
Republican	Sonny Borrelli	62,615	100.00%
Total votes		62,615	100.00%
Republican hold			

=== District 6 ===
Democratic primary results
Party	Candidate	Votes	%
Democratic	Nikki Check Bagley	13,473	100.00%
Total votes		13,473	100.00%

Republican primary results
Party	Candidate	Votes	%
Republican	Sylvia Tenney Allen (incumbent)	19,926	100.00%
Total votes		19,926	100.00%

General election results
Party	Candidate	Votes	%
Republican	Sylvia Tenney Allen (incumbent)	49,318	50.91%
Democratic	Nikki Check Bagley	47,557	49.09%
Total votes		96,875	100.00%
Republican hold			

=== District 7 ===
Democratic primary results
Party	Candidate	Votes	%
Democratic	Jamescita Peshlakai	11,774	53.59%
Democratic	Steven Begay	10,198	46.41%
Total votes		21,972	100.00%

Libertarian Primary Results
Party	Candidate	Votes	%
Libertarian	Barry Keaveney (Note: Was a write-in candidate in the primary election.)	28	100.00%
Total votes		28	100.00%

General election results
Party	Candidate	Votes	%
Democratic	Jamescita Peshlakai	54,421	100.00%
Total votes		54,421	100.00%
Democratic gain from Republican			

=== District 8 ===
Democratic primary results
Party	Candidate	Votes	%
Democratic	Barbara McGuire (incumbent)	9,361	100.00%
Total votes		9,361	100.00%

Republican primary results
Party	Candidate	Votes	%
Republican	Frank Pratt	11,669	100.00%
Total votes		11,669	100.00%

General election results
Party	Candidate	Votes	%
Republican	Frank Pratt	32,366	53.10%
Democratic	Barbara McGuire (incumbent)	28,585	46.90%
Total votes		60,951	100.00%
Republican gain from Democratic			

=== District 9 ===
Democratic primary results
Party	Candidate	Votes	%
Democratic	Steve Farley (incumbent)	20,784	100.00%
Total votes		20,784	100.00%

General election results
Party	Candidate	Votes	%
Democratic	Steve Farley (incumbent)	68,109	99.50%
Republican	Mark Spear (Note: Was a write-in candidate in the general election.)	344	0.50%
Total votes		68,453	100.00%
Democratic hold			

=== District 10 ===
Democratic primary results
Party	Candidate	Votes	%
Democratic	David Bradley (incumbent)	19,580	100.00%
Total votes		19,580	100.00%

Republican primary results
Party	Candidate	Votes	%
Republican	Randall Phelps	17,598	100.00%
Total votes		17,598	100.00%

General election results
Party	Candidate	Votes	%
Democratic	David Bradley (incumbent)	50,850	53.88%
Republican	Randall Phelps	43,526	46.12%
Total votes		94,376	100.00%
Democratic hold			

=== District 11 ===
Democratic primary results
Party	Candidate	Votes	%
Democratic	Ralph Atchue	13,250	100.00%
Total votes		13,250	100.00%

Republican primary results
Party	Candidate	Votes	%
Republican	Steve Smith (incumbent)	23,685	100.00%
Total votes		23,685	100.00%

General election results
Party	Candidate	Votes	%
Republican	Steve Smith (incumbent)	59,475	59.56%
Democratic	Ralph Atchue	40,390	40.44%
Total votes		99,865	100.00%
Republican hold			

=== District 12 ===
Democratic primary results
Party	Candidate	Votes	%
Democratic	Elizabeth Brown	7,200	100.00%
Total votes		7,200	100.00%

Republican primary results
Party	Candidate	Votes	%
Republican	Warren Petersen	14,334	55.39%
Republican	Jimmy Lindblom	11,544	44.61%
Total votes		25,878	100.00%

General election results
Party	Candidate	Votes	%
Republican	Warren Petersen	69,356	65.10%
Democratic	Elizabeth Brown	37,178	34.90%
Total votes		106,534	100.00%
Republican hold			

=== District 13 ===
Republican primary results
Party	Candidate	Votes	%
Republican	Steve Montenegro	12,943	60.40%
Republican	Diane Landis	8,486	39.60%
Total votes		21,429	100.00%

General election results
Party	Candidate	Votes	%
Republican	Steve Montenegro	62,124	100.00%
Total votes		62,124	100.00%
Republican hold			

=== District 14 ===
Democratic primary results
Party	Candidate	Votes	%
Democratic	Jaime Alvarez	11,714	100.00%
Total votes		11,714	100.00%

Republican primary results
Party	Candidate	Votes	%
Republican	Gail Griffin (incumbent)	23,035	100.00%
Total votes		23,035	100.00%

General election results
Party	Candidate	Votes	%
Republican	Gail Griffin (incumbent)	54,084	62.66%
Democratic	Jaime Alvarez	32,229	37.34%
Total votes		86,313	100.00%
Republican hold			

=== District 15 ===
Democratic primary results
Party	Candidate	Votes	%
Democratic	Tonya K. MacBeth	8,718	100.00%
Total votes		8,718	100.00%

Republican primary results
Party	Candidate	Votes	%
Republican	Nancy Barto (incumbent)	20,444	100.00%
Total votes		20,444	100.00%

General election results
Party	Candidate	Votes	%
Republican	Nancy Barto (incumbent)	62,691	63.26%
Democratic	Tonya K. MacBeth	36,414	36.74%
Total votes		99,105	100.00%
Republican hold			

=== District 16 ===
Democratic primary results
Party	Candidate	Votes	%
Democratic	Scott Prior	7,675	100.00%
Total votes		7,675	100.00%

Republican primary results
Party	Candidate	Votes	%
Republican	David Christian Farnsworth (incumbent)	19,605	100.00%
Total votes		19,605	100.00%

General election results
Party	Candidate	Votes	%
Republican	David Christian Farnsworth (incumbent)	56,096	65.02%
Democratic	Scott Prior	30,180	34.98%
Total votes		86,276	100.00%
Republican hold			

=== District 17 ===
Democratic primary results
Party	Candidate	Votes	%
Democratic	Steve Weichert	9,489	100.00%
Total votes		9,489	100.00%

Republican primary results
Party	Candidate	Votes	%
Republican	Steve Yarbrough (incumbent)	19,052	100.00%
Total votes		19,052	100.00%

General election results
Party	Candidate	Votes	%
Republican	Steve Yarbrough (incumbent)	54,454	56.65%
Democratic	Steve Weichert	41,676	43.35%
Total votes		96,130	100.00%
Republican hold			

=== District 18 ===
Democratic primary results
Party	Candidate	Votes	%
Democratic	Sean Bowie	13,098	100.00%
Total votes		13,098	100.00%

Republican primary results
Party	Candidate	Votes	%
Republican	Frank Schmuck	11,483	53.43%
Republican	Jeff Dial (incumbent)	10,008	46.57%
Total votes		21,491	100.00%

General election results
Party	Candidate	Votes	%
Democratic	Sean Bowie	53,962	51.44%
Republican	Frank Schmuck	50,935	48.56%
Total votes		104,897	100.00%
Democratic gain from Republican			

=== District 19 ===
Democratic primary results
Party	Candidate	Votes	%
Democratic	Lupe Chavira Contreras (incumbent)	6,692	100.00%
Total votes		6,692	100.00%

General election results
Party	Candidate	Votes	%
Democratic	Lupe Chavira Contreras (incumbent)	38,817	100.00%
Total votes		38,817	100.00%
Democratic hold			

=== District 20 ===
Democratic primary results
Party	Candidate	Votes	%
Democratic	Larry Herrera	9,039	100.00%
Total votes		9,039	100.00%

Republican primary results
Party	Candidate	Votes	%
Republican	Kimberly Yee (incumbent)	16,465	100.00%
Total votes		16,465	100.00%

General election results
Party	Candidate	Votes	%
Republican	Kimberly Yee (incumbent)	40,122	50.13%
Democratic	Larry Herrera	28,987	36.22%
Independent	Doug "Q" Quelland	10,928	13.65%
Total votes		80,037	100.00%
Republican hold			

=== District 21 ===
Republican primary results
Party	Candidate	Votes	%
Republican	Debbie Lesko (incumbent)	20,029	100.00%
Total votes		20,029	100.00%

General election results
Party	Candidate	Votes	%
Republican	Debbie Lesko (incumbent)	64,404	100.00%
Total votes		64,404	100.00%
Republican hold			

=== District 22 ===
Democratic primary results
Party	Candidate	Votes	%
Democratic	Michael Muscato	10,985	100.00%
Total votes		10,985	100.00%

Republican primary results
Party	Candidate	Votes	%
Republican	Judy Burges (incumbent)	28,212	100.00%
Total votes		28,212	100.00%

General election results
Party	Candidate	Votes	%
Republican	Judy Burges (incumbent)	71,863	65.04%
Democratic	Michael Muscato	38,620	34.95%
Independent	Pat White	13	0.01%
Total votes		110,496	100.00%
Republican hold			

=== District 23 ===
Republican primary results
Party	Candidate	Votes	%
Republican	John Kavanagh (incumbent)	27,782	100.00%
Total votes		27,782	100.00%

General election results
Party	Candidate	Votes	%
Republican	John Kavanagh (incumbent)	88,099	100.00%
Total votes		88,099	100.00%
Republican hold			

=== District 24 ===
Democratic primary results
Party	Candidate	Votes	%
Democratic	Katie Hobbs (incumbent)	12,601	100.00%
Total votes		12,601	100.00%

General election results
Party	Candidate	Votes	%
Democratic	Katie Hobbs (incumbent)	54,351	100.00%
Total votes		54,351	100.00%
Democratic hold			

=== District 25 ===
Republican primary results
Party	Candidate	Votes	%
Republican	Bob Worsley (incumbent)	23,460	97.58%
Republican	Itasca Small	582	2.42%
Total votes		24,042	100.00%

General election results
Party	Candidate	Votes	%
Republican	Bob Worsley (incumbent)	69,914	100.00%
Total votes		69,914	100.00%
Republican hold			

=== District 26 ===
Democratic primary results
Party	Candidate	Votes	%
Democratic	Juan Jose Mendez	6,488	74.87%
Democratic	David Lucier	2,178	25.13%
Total votes		8,666	100.00%

Libertarian Primary Results
Party	Candidate	Votes	%
Libertarian	Chris Will	44	100.00%
Total votes		44	100.00%

General election results
Party	Candidate	Votes	%
Democratic	Juan Jose Mendez	40,995	100.00%
Total votes		40,995	100.00%
Democratic hold			

=== District 27 ===
Democratic primary results
Party	Candidate	Votes	%
Democratic	Catherine Miranda (incumbent)	6,049	56.04%
Democratic	Maritza Miranda Saenz	4,746	43.96%
Total votes		10,795	100.00%

Green Primary Results
Party	Candidate	Votes	%
Green	Angel Torres	8	100.00%
Total votes		8	100.00%

General election results
Party	Candidate	Votes	%
Democratic	Catherine Miranda (incumbent)	40,085	81.04%
Green	Angel Torres	9,381	18.96%
Total votes		49,466	100.00%
Democratic hold			

=== District 28 ===
Democratic primary results
Party	Candidate	Votes	%
Democratic	Eric Meyer	13,724	100.00%
Total votes		13,724	100.00%

Republican primary results
Party	Candidate	Votes	%
Republican	Kate Brophy McGee	20,258	100.00%
Total votes		20,258	100.00%

General election results
Party	Candidate	Votes	%
Republican	Kate Brophy McGee	50,436	51.17%
Democratic	Eric Meyer	48,124	48.83%
Total votes		98,560	100.00%
Republican hold			

=== District 29 ===
Democratic primary results
Party	Candidate	Votes	%
Democratic	Martín Quezada (incumbent)	4,661	66.17%
Democratic	Lydia Hernández	2,383	33.83%
Total votes		7,044	100.00%

Republican primary results
Party	Candidate	Votes	%
Republican	Crystal Nuttle	4,059	100.00%
Total votes		4,059	100.00%

General election results
Party	Candidate	Votes	%
Democratic	Martín Quezada (incumbent)	29,638	68.52%
Republican	Crystal Nuttle	13,615	31.48%
Total votes		43,253	100.00%
Democratic hold			

=== District 30 ===
Democratic primary results
Party	Candidate	Votes	%
Democratic	Robert Meza (incumbent)	7,118	100.00%
Total votes		7,118	100.00%

Republican primary results
Party	Candidate	Votes	%
Republican	John Lyon	5,154	100.00%
Total votes		5,154	100.00%

General election results
Party	Candidate	Votes	%
Democratic	Robert Meza (incumbent)	27,941	66.38%
Republican	John Lyon	14,152	33.62%
Total votes		42,093	100.00%
Democratic hold			
