= Isela Blanc =

American politician

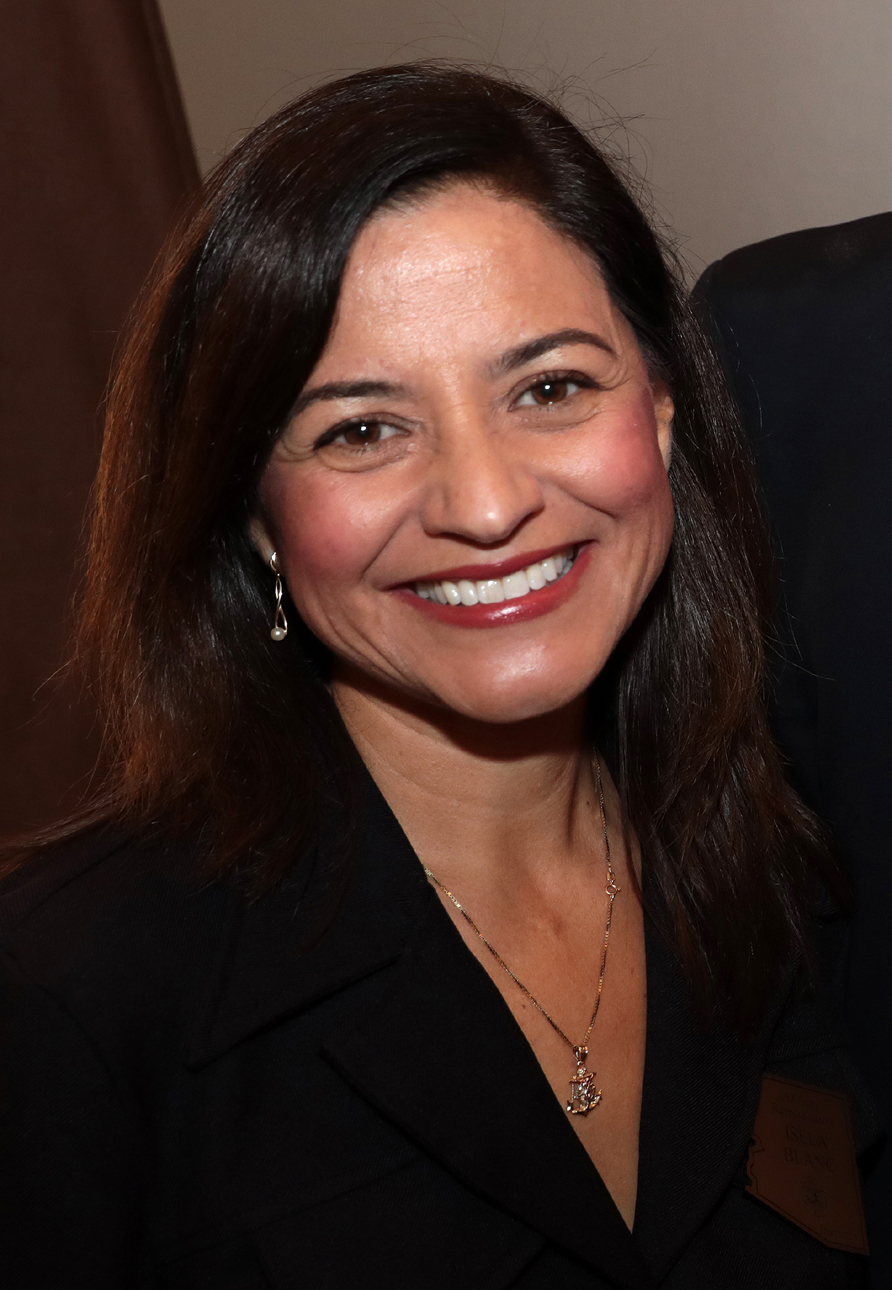

Member of the Arizona House of Representatives from the 26th district
- In office January 9, 2017 – January 11, 2021 Serving with Athena Salman
- Preceded by: Celeste Plumlee
- Succeeded by: Melody Hernandez

Personal details
- Born: 01/11
- Party: Democratic
- Spouse: Todd Blanc (Divorced)
- Children: Andrew Blanc, Alexis Blanc

Isela Blanc is an American politician who served as a member of the Arizona House of Representatives from 2017 to 2021.

== Positions ==
Blanc supported Proposition 205, which would have legalized recreational use of marijuana for those 21 and older.

== Elections ==
- 2016 Blanc and Athena Salman defeated incumbent Celeste Plumlee, who'd been appointed following the resignation of Andrew Sherwood, and Michael Martinez in the District 26 Democratic Primary. Blanc and Salman defeated Republican Steven Adkins and Green party candidate Cara Trujillo in the general election.
