= Sue Donahue =

American politician

Member of the Arizona Senate from the 5th district
- In office January 7, 2016 – January 9, 2017
- Preceded by: Kelli Ward
- Succeeded by: Sonny Borrelli

Personal details
- Party: Republican

Sue Donahue is an American politician. Donahue was appointed in 2016 to serve in the Arizona State Senate representing the fifth legislative district as a member of the Republican Party. Donahue replaced Kelli Ward who resigned to run for the United States Senate. Donahue did not run for election in 2016 and was replaced by Sonny Borrelli.
