= Matt Kopec =

American politician

Member of the Arizona House of Representatives from the 9th district
- In office January 19, 2016 – January 9, 2017
- Preceded by: Victoria Steele
- Succeeded by: Pamela Hannley

Personal details
- Party: Democratic
- Website: kopecforarizona.wordpress.com

Matt Kopec is an American politician from the state of Arizona. A member of the Democratic Party, Kopec served in the Arizona House of Representatives.

== Career ==
The Pima County Board of Supervisors picked Kopec to replace Victoria Steele, who stepped down to focus on her congressional run.

Kopec was elected to the Governing Board of Amphitheater Public Schools in 2018.
