= Victoria Steele =

American politician

Member of the Arizona Senate from the 9th district
- In office January 14, 2019 – January 9, 2023
- Preceded by: Steve Farley
- Succeeded by: Priya Sundareshan

Member of the Arizona House of Representatives from the 9th district
- In office January 2013 – January 11, 2016 Serving with Randy Friese
- Succeeded by: Matt Kopec

Personal details
- Party: Democratic
- Education: Prescott College; University of Phoenix
- Website: victoriasteeleforjustice.com

Victoria Steele is a former Democratic member of the Arizona State Senate representing District 9 from 2019 to 2023. She is a twice elected former Democratic member of the Arizona House of Representatives, serving District 9 in Tucson from 2013 to 2016. She is a board member of the National Organization for Women (NOW). In 2019, she began the podcast Wait, What? Politics with Zuma and Steele, co-hosting with journalist Jimmy Zuma. She was elected as a Justice of the Peace in 2022.

Prior to entering politics, she had a career in radio and television news. She also created the Native Ways program at The Haven, a substance-use residential treatment program for Indigenous women. As a politician, she was on the board of the National Caucus of the Native American State Legislators.

In July 2015, she announced that she would run in the 2nd congressional district of Arizona for the 2016 United States House of Representatives, hoping to challenge incumbent Martha McSally. She resigned from the Arizona legislature in January 2016 to focus on her congressional race. Steele was endorsed in the Democratic primary by U.S. Representative Raúl Grijalva.

She is the State Legislative Coordinator for NOW and co-founder of the Tucson NOW Chapter.

Steele is of Seneca-Mingo and German heritage.

== See also ==
- List of Native American politicians
- Native American women in politics
