= Tony Navarrete =

American politician

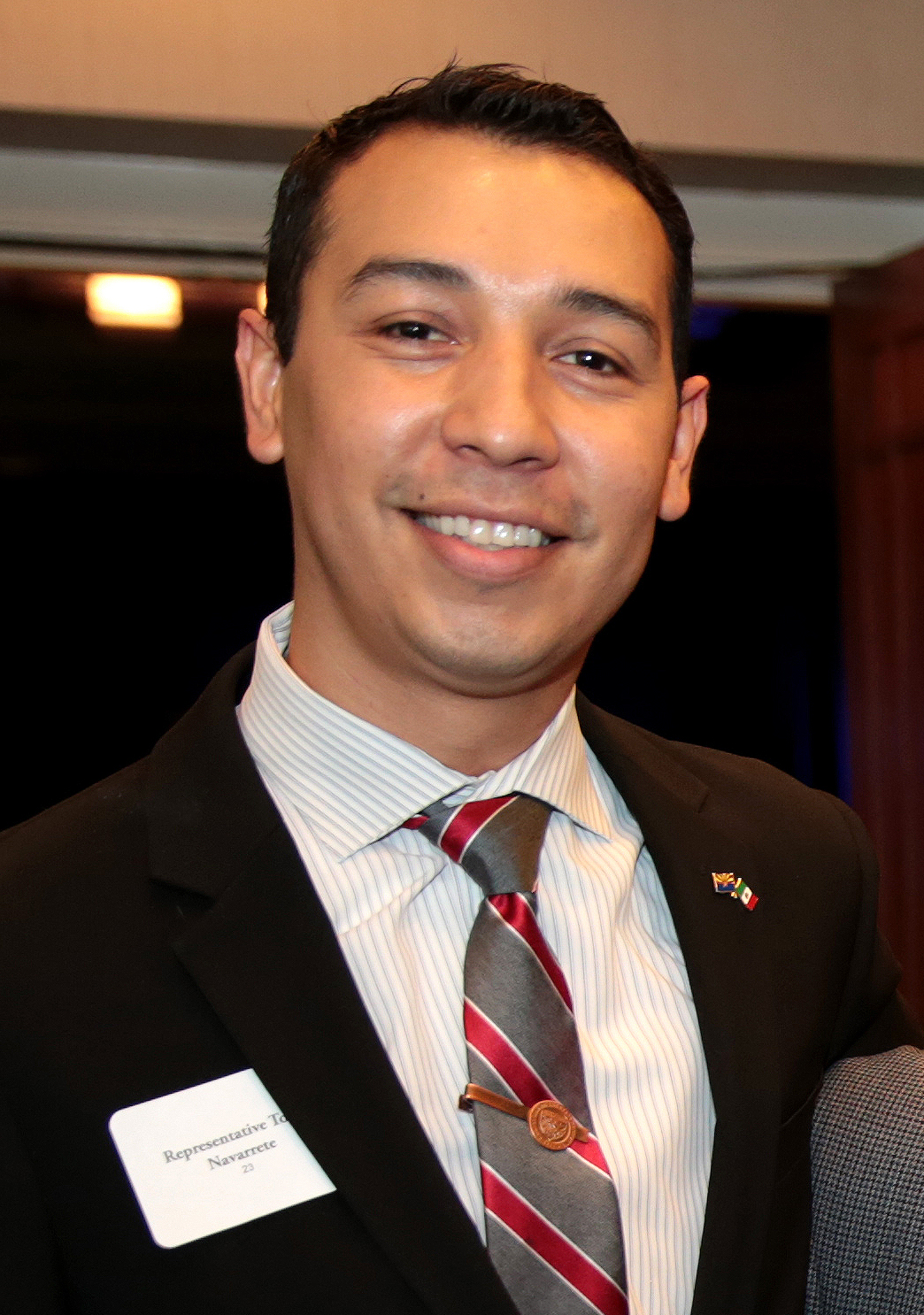
- Navarrete in 2017

Member of the Arizona Senate from the 30th district
- In office January 14, 2019 – August 10, 2021
- Preceded by: Robert Meza
- Succeeded by: Raquel Terán

Member of the Arizona House of Representatives from the 30th district
- In office January 9, 2017 – January 14, 2019 Serving with Ray Martinez
- Preceded by: Debbie McCune Davis
- Succeeded by: Raquel Terán

Personal details
- Born: 1985 or 1986 (age 40–41)
- Party: Democratic

Otoniel "Tony" Navarrete (born October 14, 1986) is an American politician who served as the state senator for Arizona's 30th legislative district from 2019 to 2021. A member of the Democratic Party, he previously served one term as a state representative for Arizona's 30th legislative district from 2017 to 2019. He resigned from the state senate on August 10, 2021, after being charged with multiple counts of sexual conduct with underaged children.

== Career ==
Navarrete was a community organizer with Promise Arizona, a pro-immigration advocacy group which helped Hispanics and Latinos register to vote at taco trucks after Marco Gutierrez's "taco trucks on every corner" remark. During his time in office, Navarrete was one of four openly LGBT members of the Arizona State Legislature, alongside Robert Meza, Daniel Hernández, and Cesar Chavez, and was a founding member of the legislature's LGBT caucus.

== Child sex abuse charges ==
On August 5, 2021, Navarrete was arrested in Phoenix on multiple charges of sexual conduct with a minor in 2019, including one count of molestation of a minor involving two boys aged 16 and 13. The two victims worked with the FBI to secure verbal testimony from Navarrete admitting to and apologizing for the sexual acts. The two boys, per the police report, were his nephews. Navarette abused one boy at night for several years per recorded conversations overhead by police. He was released on a $50,000 secured bond. The serious nature of the charges resulted in bipartisan calls for his resignation. Navarette resigned on August 10, 2021.

In October 2023, Navarrete's case resulted in a mistrial. The case went to trial again, where in February 2024, a jury convicted Navarrete of one count of sexual conduct with a minor, but acquitted him of molestation of a child and a second count of sexual conduct with a minor. In April 2024, Navarrete was sentenced to one year in prison followed by 10 years of supervised release for his crimes.

== Elections ==
In 2016, Navarrete and Ray Martinez defeated incumbent Jonathan Larkin in the Democratic primary and went on to defeat Republican Gary Cox the general election.
