= Ray Martinez (politician) =

American politician

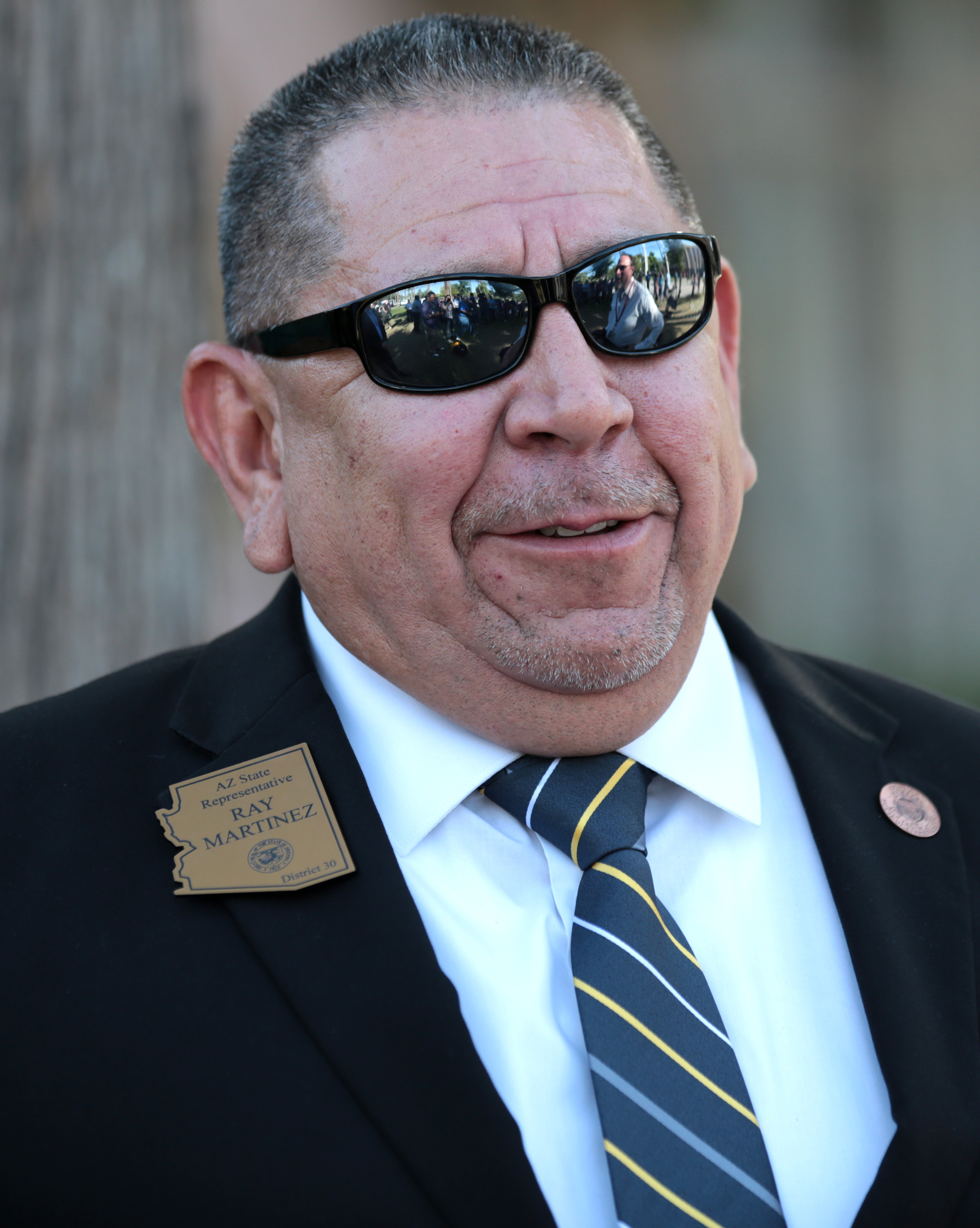

Member of the Arizona House of Representatives from the 30th district
- In office January 9, 2017 – January 14, 2019 Serving with Tony Navarrete
- Preceded by: Jonathan Larkin
- Succeeded by: Raquel Teran

Personal details
- Party: Democratic

Ray Martinez is an American politician and a Democratic former member of the Arizona House of Representatives elected to represent District 30 in 2016.

== Elections ==
- 2016 Martinez and Tony Navarrete defeated incumbent Jonathan Larkin in the Democratic primary and went on to defeat Republican Gary Cox the general election.
- 2018 Martinez chose not to run for re-election.
