= Stefanie Mach =

American politician

Member of the Arizona House of Representatives from the 10th district
- In office January 15, 2013 – January 9, 2017
- Succeeded by: Kirsten Engel; Todd Clodfelter

Personal details
- Party: Democratic
- Education: University of Wisconsin–Stevens Point; Brown University

Stefanie Mach is a former Democratic member of the Arizona House of Representatives. Mach was involved in a car accident in her teens that left her companion dead and her with life-altering injuries. In addition to serving in the legislature, Mach also operates CM Concordia Consulting, which specializes in non-profit and political consulting to address societal problems and positively impact communities.

== Elections ==
- 2014 Mach and Bruce Wheeler were unopposed in the Democratic primary. Mach and Wheeler defeated William Wildish and Todd Clodfelter in the general election.
- 2012 Mach and incumbent Bruce Wheeler defeated Brandon Patrick in the Democratic primary and defeated Republican incumbent Ted Vogt and Todd Clodfelter with Mach receiving 40,843 votes.
