= Juan Mendez (politician) =

American politician (born 1985)

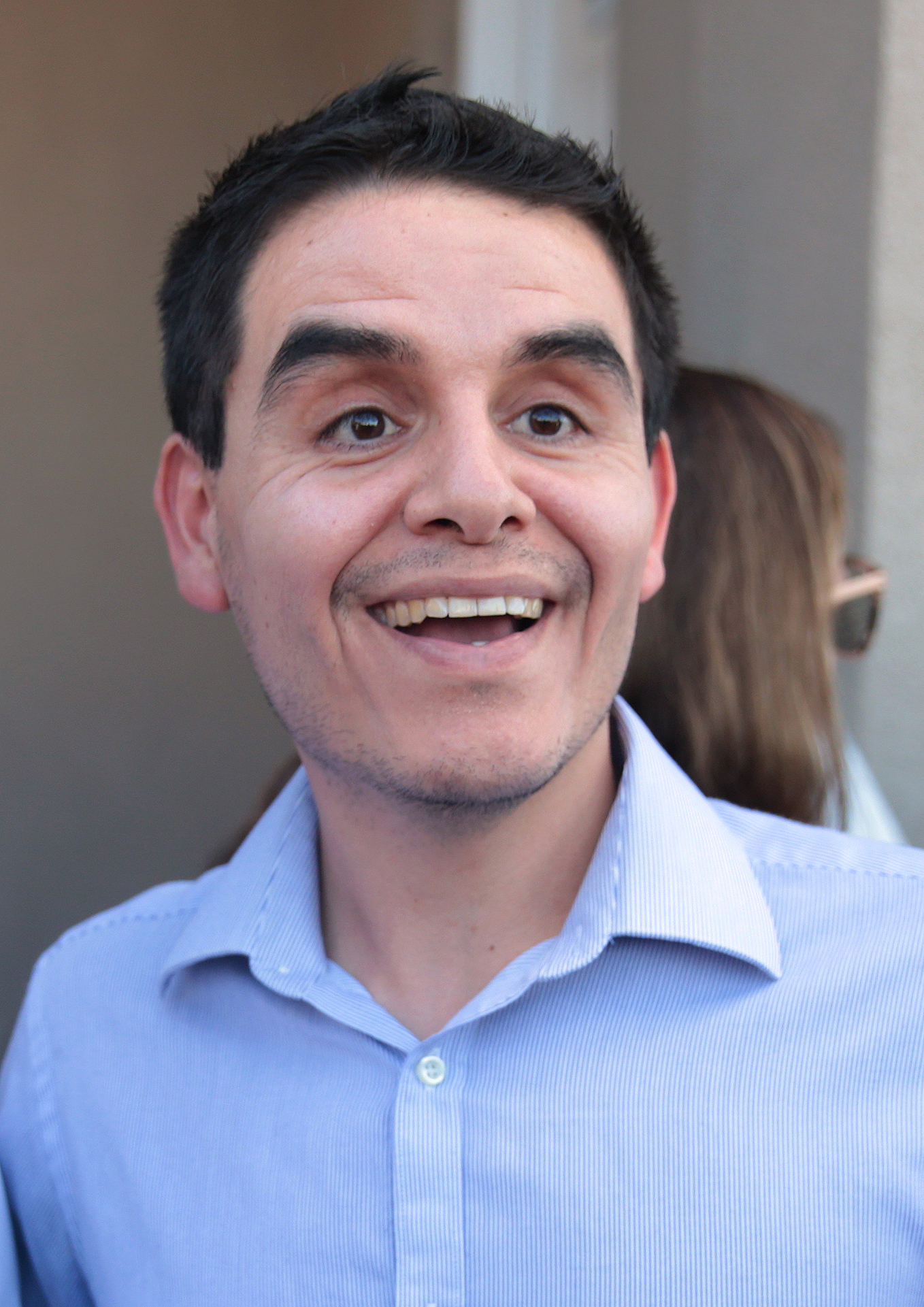

Member of the Arizona Senate
- In office January 9, 2017 – January 13, 2025
- Preceded by: Andrew Sherwood
- Succeeded by: Lauren Kuby
- Constituency: 26th district (2017–2023); 8th district (2023–2025)

Member of the Arizona House of Representatives from the 26th district
- In office January 2013 – January 9, 2017
- Preceded by: Terri Proud
- Succeeded by: Athena Salman

Personal details
- Born: May 18, 1985 (age 41) Arizona, U.S.
- Party: Democratic
- Spouse: Athena Salman (m. 2022)
- Education: Phoenix College (AA); Arizona State University (BA)
- Website: Government website

Juan Jose Mendez (born May 18, 1985) is an American politician and former State Senator from Arizona. He is a member of the Democratic Party.

== Education ==
Born and raised in Arizona, Mendez attended Tolleson Union High School and received an associate degree from Phoenix College. He later received a bachelor's degree from Arizona State University, majoring in political science.

== Political career ==
Mendez serves on the City of Phoenix Human Services Advisory Committee, and manages the nonprofit Community Voice Mail, an organization devoted to helping the impoverished.

=== Arizona House of Representatives ===
Mendez was elected to the Arizona House of Representatives in 2012. He served on the Insurance and Retirement Committee and the Reform and Human Services Committee.

Mendez supported closing "tax loopholes" for out-of-state corporations, raising education funding, and more restrictions on gifts to legislators. He opposed Arizona SB 1070 and allowing guns in schools.

Mendez is an atheist, and one of few atheist politicians serving in the United States. Mendez gained national attention in 2013 for choosing to open a House meeting with a secular speech, rather than a traditional religious prayer. During his speech, Mendez quoted Carl Sagan.

Mendez, along with fellow representatives Clark, Hale, Larkin, and Mach, introduced HB2283 in 2016 to enact Ranked-Choice Voting for all Arizona elections. The text of the bill contained provisions for Instant Runoff Voting, for single-seat positions, and for Single Transferable Vote, for multi-seat positions. It also contained provisions to educate voters on Ranked-Choice Voting, and to ensure voting machines would be compliant with ranked ballots. The bill was referred to both the House Elections Committee and the House Rules Committee, but received no action in either committee, and received no floor votes.

=== Arizona State Senate ===
Mendez was elected to the Arizona State Senate in 2016, succeeding Andrew Sherwood.

In 2018, The Arizona Republic confirmed that Mendez plagiarized some responses to a questionnaire. Additionally, in 2018, he was the only member of the Arizona Senate to vote against a bill designating the Sonorasaurus as Arizona's state dinosaur. In his vote explanation, Mendez stated that he voted against the bill because it didn't have an amendment acknowledging that the dinosaur was a vegetarian.

In 2023, Mendez became the Ranking Member of the Senate Committee on Elections.

In February 2024, Mendez welcomed members of the Satanic Temple of Arizona to the Arizona Senate and discussed their right to religious freedom. Mendez would go on later in the day to be the only Senator to vote against a bill banning Satanic displays on State Property.

=== 2024 Arizona House of Representatives campaign ===
In 2024, Mendez was term-limited from the Senate and instead ran for the House of Representatives. He placed third in the Democratic primary with 32.18% of the vote, losing to first-time candidates Brian Garcia and Janeen Connolly.

== Personal life ==
In mid-March 2019, Mendez became engaged to a fellow legislator, Arizona Representative Athena Salman, and they were married in 2022. Together, they have two children. Mendez is an atheist.

== See also ==
- List of atheists in politics and law
