= Drew John =

American politician (born 1957)

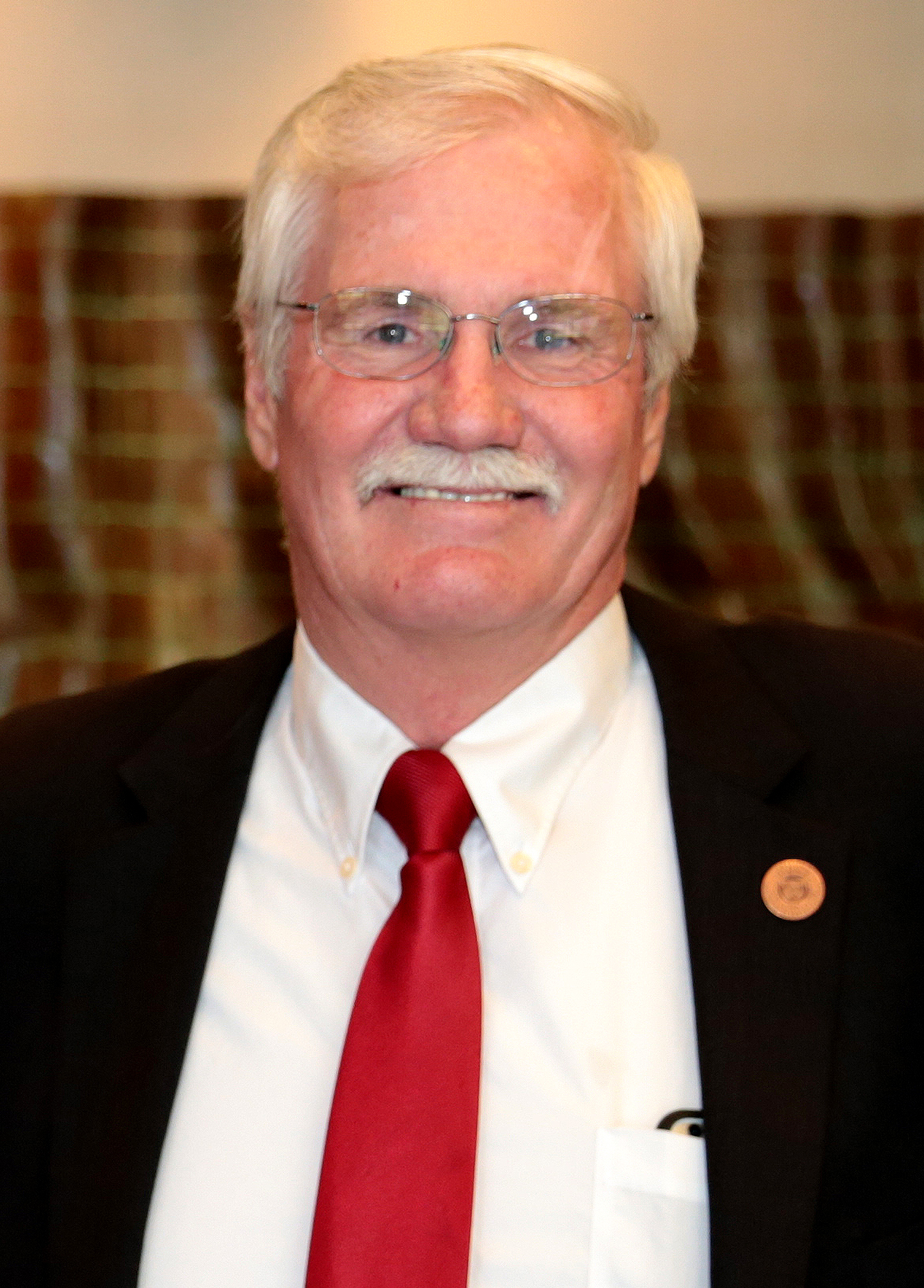

Member of the Arizona House of Representatives from the 14th district
- In office January 9, 2017 – January 14, 2019 Serving with Becky Nutt
- Preceded by: David Stevens
- Succeeded by: Gail Griffin

Supervisor for Graham County from the 1st District
- In office 2001–2017
- Succeeded by: Paul David

Personal details
- Born: October 2, 1957 (age 69) Safford, Az
- Party: Republican (2014–present)
- Spouse: Deborah JOHN
- Children: three
- Education: Benson Bobcats
- Profession: Small business owner
- Website: Campaign Website

Drew John is an American politician and a former Republican member of the Arizona House of Representatives elected to represent District 14 from 2017 to 2019. He also served 4 terms as Graham County Supervisor representing the 1st district. He lost a bid for Arizona State Senate to David Gowan in 2018.

== Elections ==
- 2016 – John and Becky Nutt defeated Democrats Mike Holmes and Jason Lindstrom in the general election, with John receiving 49,914 votes.
- 2016 – With Speaker David Gowan and David Stevens term limited, John and Becky Nutt defeated Anthony Sizer and Dennis Barger in the Republican Primary for the Arizona House of Representatives district 14.
- 2012 – John was unopposed for reelection to the board of supervisors for a 4th term.
- 2008 – John defeated independent Dale Bohem for reelection to the board of supervisors for a 3rd term.
- 2000 – John defeated long time Safford Fire Chief Dick Bingham to become County Supervisor
