= Mark Cardenas =

American politician

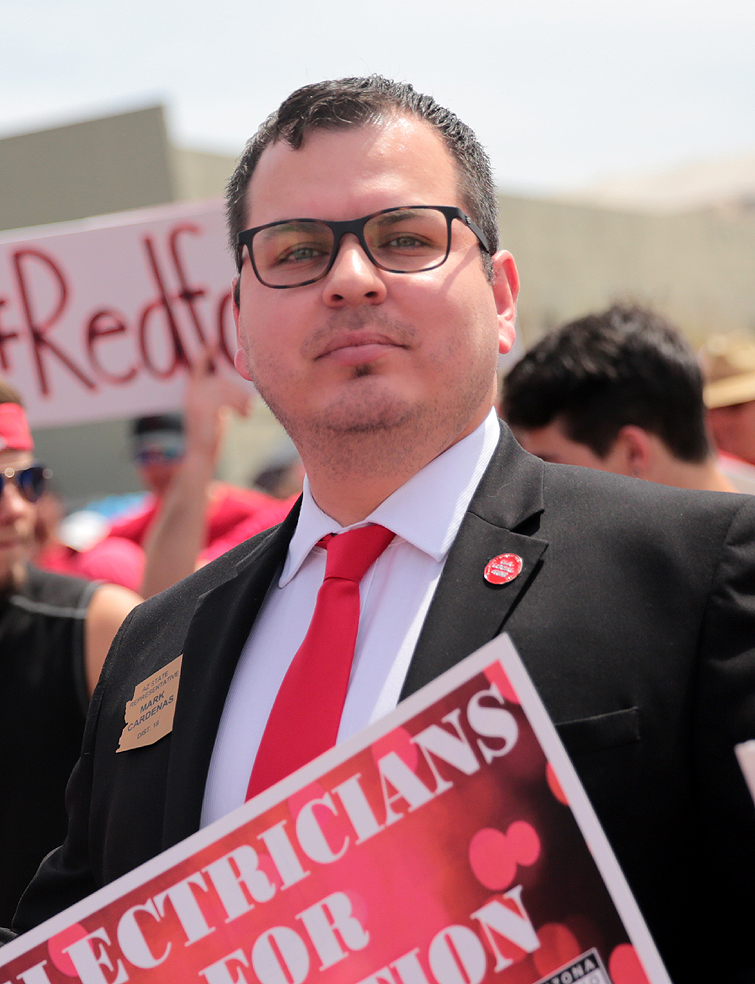

Member of the Arizona House of Representatives from the 19th district
- In office January 14, 2013 – January 14, 2019 Serving with Diego Espinoza
- Succeeded by: Lorenzo Sierra

Personal details
- Born: October 23, 1986 (age 39)
- Party: Democratic
- Education: Arizona State University

Mark Cardenas (born October 23, 1986) is a former Democratic member of the Arizona House of Representatives, serving from 2013 to 2019. Before serving in the legislature, Cardenas was a soldier (serving in the Iraq War) and an accountant. He also serves on the Estrella Village Planning Committee. In 2013, Cardenas spent a week living on the street to raise money for a transitional-living facility for female veterans.
