= Athena Salman =

American politician

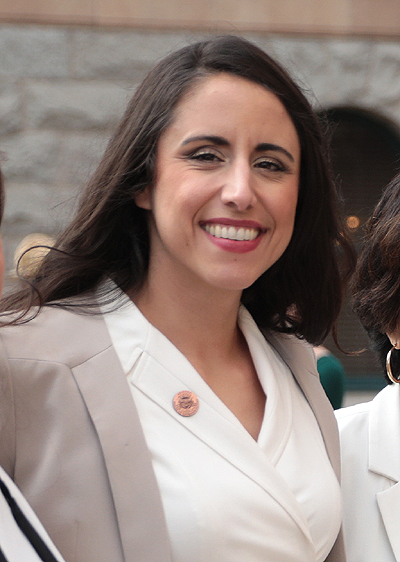

Member of the Arizona House of Representatives
- In office January 9, 2017 – January 1, 2024
- Preceded by: Juan Mendez
- Succeeded by: Jevin Hodge
- Constituency: 26th district (2017–2023); 8th district (2023–2024)

Personal details
- Born: 1989 (age 36–37) Phoenix, Arizona, U.S.
- Party: Democratic
- Spouse: Juan Mendez (m. 2022)
- Education: Arizona State University (BA)

Athena Salman (born 1989) is an American politician and activist who served as a member of the Arizona House of Representatives from the 26th and 8th districts from 2017 to 2024. She resigned from the legislature effective January 1, 2024.

== Early life and education ==
Athena Salman was born in Phoenix, Arizona. Her family has roots in Mexico, Germany, and the West Bank. Salman led community service projects during her youth. In college, she was an organizing intern and senior fellow with the Arizona Students’ Association. She graduated magna cum laude from Arizona State University with degrees in economics and political science.

== Career ==
Salman spoke at the 2017 American Atheists Convention.

In 2016, Salman defeated incumbent Celeste Plumlee and Michael Martinez in the District 26 Democratic primary. Salman defeated Republican Steven Adkins and Green party candidate Cara Trujillo in the general election. In 2018, Salman defeated Republican Ray Speakman in the general election. In both elections, Salman ran as a Clean Election Candidate and received no PAC contributions.

Salman, an atheist, made national headlines during her first legislative session when she gave a humanist prayer on the House floor, which was ruled out of order by the Speaker of the Arizona House of Representatives.

In 2018, Salman's legislation to provide unlimited feminine hygiene products to incarcerated women was heard in an all-male committee. As a result, a viral campaign to pressure immediate change ensued leading to a policy change by the Arizona Department of Corrections that increased the allotment of pads and for the first time included tampons.

Salman was one of nine women to come forward with sexual harassment allegations against former Arizona House of Representatives member Don Shooter, eventually leading to his expulsion.

Salman supported Proposition 205 in 2016, which would legalize recreational use of marijuana for those 21 and older. Salman also supports public education, immigration reform, reproductive rights and LGBTQ equality.

On January 1, 2024, Salman submitted her resignation from the legislature to Speaker of the House Ben Toma. She resigned in order to take a position as the director of Arizona campaigns for the state chapter of Reproductive Freedom for All.

== Recognition ==
Salman was recognized as 2018 Best Politician by Phoenix New Times and named by The Arizona Republic's top ten newsmakers to watch in 2019. Salman and state senator Juan Mendez received Phoenix New Time's 2017 Best Power Couple. She was also awarded the City of Tempe's MLK Diversity Award in 2016.
