= Pamela Hannley =

American politician (born 1951)

Pamela Powers Hannley
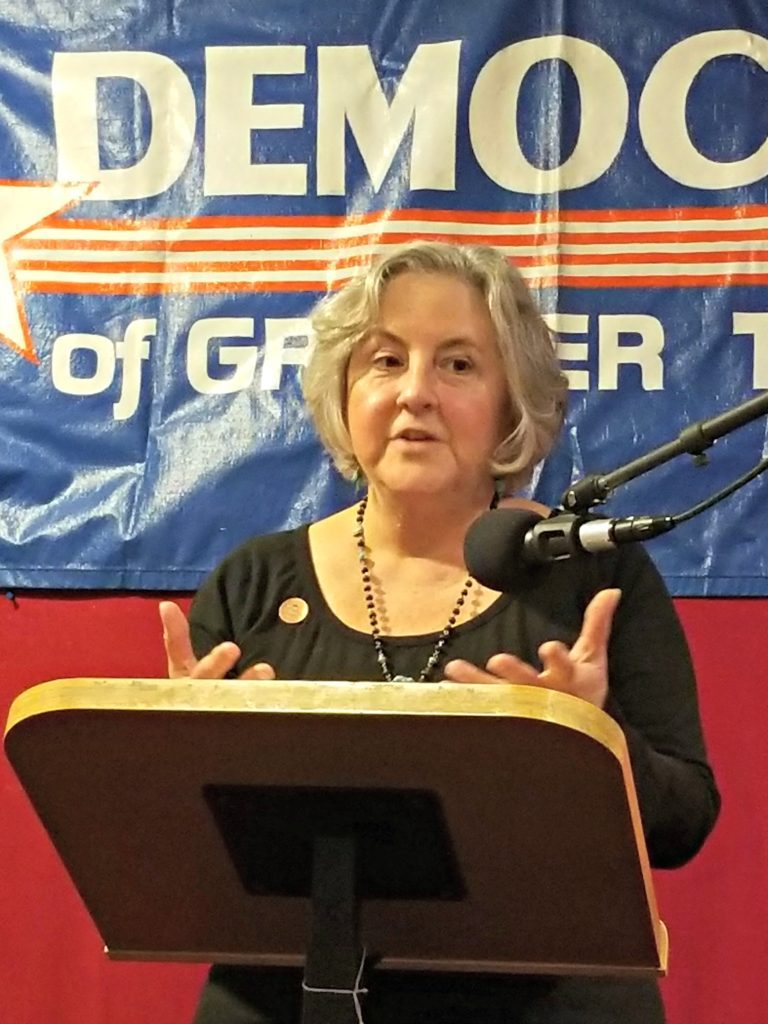
- Hannley in 2017

Member of the Arizona House of Representatives from the 9th district
- In office January 9, 2017 – January 9, 2023 Serving with Christopher Mathis
- Preceded by: Matt Kopec
- Succeeded by: Lorena Austin

Personal details
- Born: July 30, 1951 (age 75) Amherst, Ohio
- Party: Democratic
- Spouse: James P. Hannley
- Children: Alexandra K. Queen, Edward A. Queen
- Education: Ohio State University; University of Arizona
- Profession: Politician, writer
- Website: Campaign Website

Pamela Powers Hannley (born July 30, 1951) is an American activist, blogger, politician and a former Democratic member of the Arizona House of Representatives elected to represent District 9 in 2016, serving until 2023. In addition to her work in the Arizona Legislature, she is also the social media and technology editor of the American Journal of Medicine.

== Early life, education and career ==
Powers Hannley is a native of Amherst, Ohio but has lived in Tucson, Arizona since 1981. For most of her professional career, Powers Hannley worked in public relations and corporate communications. For several years, she owned her own communication consulting and freelance writing business—Powers/Queen Associates. After receiving a Masters in Public Health from the University of Arizona, she shifted her career to public health and behavioral medicine research. She is the former Program Director and Principal Investigator for the Arizona Smokers Helpline and related Internet and evaluation services (1998-2004) and former managing editor of the American Journal of Medicine (2004–2016).

Powers Hannley received a bachelor's degree in journalism from Ohio State University in 1973 and a master's degree in public health from the University of Arizona in 1996. She also attended Muskingum College in New Concord, Ohio and Pima Community College in Tucson, Arizona. Powers Hannley is a graduate of Marion L. Steele High School in Amherst, Ohio.

== Elections ==
- 2018 – Powers Hannley runs for re-election to the Arizona House.
- 2016 – Powers Hannley and Friese went on to defeat Republican Ana Henderson in the general election.
- 2016 – Powers Hannley and incumbent Randall Friese defeated incumbent Matt Kopec in the Democratic Primary.
