= Andrew Sherwood =

American politician

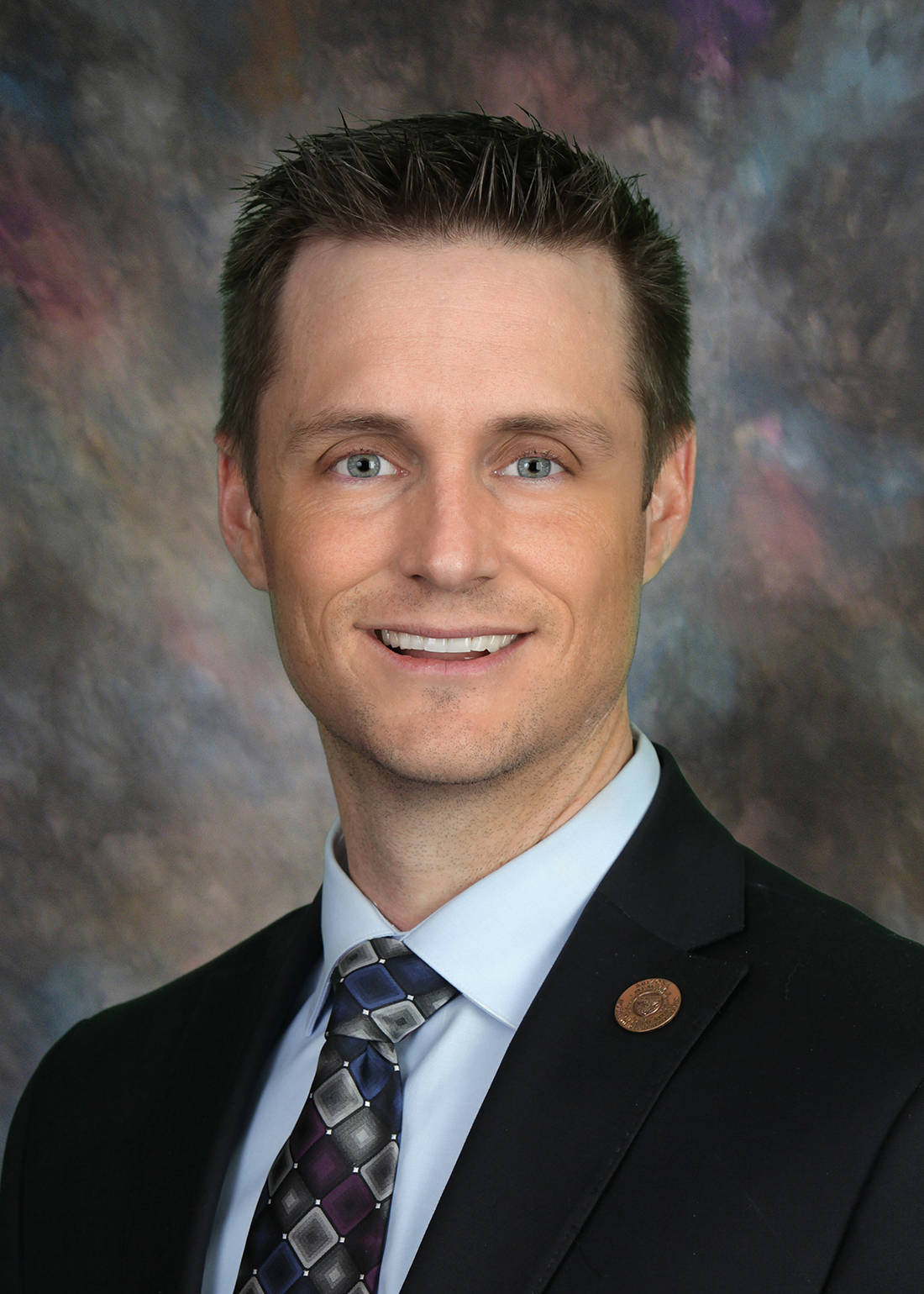

Member of the Arizona Senate from the 26th district
- In office November 5, 2015 – January 9, 2017
- Preceded by: Ed Ableser
- Succeeded by: Juan Mendez

Member of the Arizona House of Representatives from the 26th district
- In office 2013 – November 5, 2015
- Preceded by: Ed Ableser
- Succeeded by: Celeste Plumlee

Personal details
- Born: November 10, 1980 (age 45) Tucson, Arizona
- Party: Democratic
- Spouse(s): Amber Gell (m, 2015; div, 2020)
- Education: Arizona State University
- Website: sherwoodforaz.com

Andrew Sherwood (born November 10, 1980) is a Democratic former member of the Arizona State Senate, serving from 2015 to 2017. Prior to being appointed to the Senate, Sherwood was the Ranking Democratic member of the House Ways and Means committee and served on the House Appropriations committee and on the Joint Committee for Capital Review.

During the first session of his term in office in 2013, Sherwood sponsored 10 bills as the Prime Prime Sponsor (indicating he is the author of the bill) and 47 bills as the Prime Sponsor. In the 2014 session, he introduced 10 pieces of legislation as the Prime Prime Sponsor, 46 bills as Prime Sponsor and 22 as Co-sponsor. In the 2015 session, he introduced 16 pieces of legislation as the Prime Prime Sponsor, 28 as Prime Sponsor and 21 as Co-Sponsor.

Before serving in the legislature, Sherwood was a professional animal trainer and worked as the Director of Marketing for GreatSpaces.

Sherwood did not seek reelection to the Arizona Senate, having left the state for other employment.

== Elections ==
Sherwood ran for the Arizona State Senate in Legislative District 18 in 2010. He defeated Robert Hernandez McDonald, Jr. in the Democratic Primary Election and was defeated by Republican Russell Pearce in the general election.

Andrew Sherwood was elected to serve the new Legislative District 26 in the 2012 General Election.

In the LD-26 primary election held on August 26, 2014, Sherwood was nominated for re-election by his party with 48% of the vote. He won re-election and was the top vote-getter in the November 4, 2014 LD-26 house race receiving 13,584 total votes.

In November 2015, Sherwood was appointed to the Arizona State Senate, filling the seat left vacant by the resignation of Ed Ableser.

=== Recall of Russell Pearce ===
As the Democratic District Chairman for Arizona's Legislative District 18, Sherwood was supportive of the successful effort to recall State Senate President Russell Pearce, the sponsor of Senate Bill 1070. Sherwood declined to run against Pearce in the recall election himself and endorsed opposition candidate Jerry Lewis in the race.

== Issues advocacy ==
Sherwood founded the Science Caucus in the Arizona Legislature, chaired by one Democrat and one Republican from each chamber. Sherwood's position on climate change, is that "The debate over the science is over. Climate change is happening. We are causing it, and we are on the front burner here in Arizona."

He has advocated for equal rights for members of the LGBT community, taking strong stands against SB1045, the "Papers Please Bathroom Bill," and SB1062, the "Religious Freedom" bill.

Sherwood opposed limiting lifetime welfare benefits in Arizona to one year and was quoted in The New York Times as saying, "This is a very small investment, but it is critical to people who need it the most ... You're talking about desperate families, those who are unemployed and underemployed. Single mothers and parents with kids."

He has sponsored a bill that would create a registry to track persons convicted of animal abuse.

=== 2013 – regular session ===
During his first term in office, Rep. Sherwood was the Prime or Co-sponsor of 12 bills that were signed into law.

1. HB2074 – Now: licensing; foster homes (prime sponsor)
2. HB2136 – firefighter and EMT memorial (co-sponsor)
3. HB2611 – school district superintendent contracts; renegotiation (co-sponsor)
4. HCR2035 – recognizing Arizona caregivers (co-sponsor)
5. HCR2036 – Boy Scouts of America (co-sponsor)

=== 2014 – regular session ===
1. HB2163 – limited liability; space flight activities (prime sponsor)
2. HB2164 – laser pointer; aircraft; violation (prime sponsor)
3. HB2571 – criminal damage; economic costs (prime sponsor)
4. HB2624 – Yarnell Hill memorial; appropriation (co-sponsor)
5. HJR2002 – January 8 memorial; support (prime sponsor)
6. SB1326 – state parks; donations; fund; transportation (prime sponsor)

=== 2014 – second special session ===
1. HCR2001 – Don Jansen; death resolution (co-sponsor)

== Media coverage ==
Phoenix New Times: Jon Hulburd's a Turncoat, and Terry Goddard's Weak. So Who Are This Year's Democratic Role Models? pg. 4, Oct. 28, 2010

Phoenix New Times: Animal Abuse Registry Proposed by a Pair of Arizona Lawmakers, Phoenix New Times, Jan. 15, 2014

KJZZ 91.5: House Approves Bill Against Laser Pointing, February 14, 2014

Phoenix New Times, SB 1062 Protesters March on the Arizona Capitol, February 24, 2014

== Charitable work ==
Sherwood has served on the board of directors for People to People International Greater Phoenix, Arizona chapter since 2012. He has also donated time to Rescue a Golden Arizona, a Phoenix, AZ based animal rescue organization.
