= Celeste Plumlee =

American social worker and community advocate

Celeste Plumlee is an American social worker and community advocate who was appointed to the Arizona House of Representatives in December 2015. She is a Democrat and represented Legislative District 26 which includes parts of Tempe, Mesa, Phoenix, and the Salt River Pima–Maricopa Indian Community. She replaced Andrew Sherwood when he was appointed to the State Senate.

== Personal ==
Plumlee is an Arizona native and lives in Tempe with her two children.

== Education ==
Plumlee attended Arizona State University and received a Bachelor of Arts in Sociology as well as Master of Social Work and Master of Public Administration.
