= Jonathan Larkin =

American politician (born 1984)

Member of the Arizona House of Representatives from the 30th district
- In office 2013 – January 9, 2017

Personal details
- Born: January 30, 1984 (age 42)
- Party: Democratic

Jonathan Larkin (born January 30, 1984) is an American former politician who served as a Democratic member of the Arizona House of Representatives from 2013 to 2017. Larkin enlisted in the Marines out of high school after participating in JROTC. He participated in the invasion of Iraq, then served a tour of duty in the Philippines and another tour in Iraq. In addition to serving in the legislature, Larkin also worked for Fry's Food Stores.

== Electoral history ==
- 2016 – Incumbent Larkin ran for reelection, while McCune-Davis retired from the Legislature. Larkin placed third behind Democratic primary challengers Ray Martinez and Tony Navarrete. Martinez and Navarrete went on to win the general election.
- 2014 – Incumbents Jonathan Larkin and Debbie McCune-Davis were unopposed in the Democratic primary. Michael Gidwani and John Lyon were unopposed in the Republican primary. Larkin and McCune-Davis defeated Gidwani, Lyon and Angel Garcia (I) in the general election.
- 2012 – Larkin and incumbent Debbie McCune-Davis defeated Mike Snitz in the Democratic primary on August 28, 2012. They won the general election on November 6, 2012.
