= 2018 Arizona State House of Representatives election =

2018 Arizona House of Representatives election
- November 6, 2018

All 60 seats in the Arizona House 31 seats needed for a majority
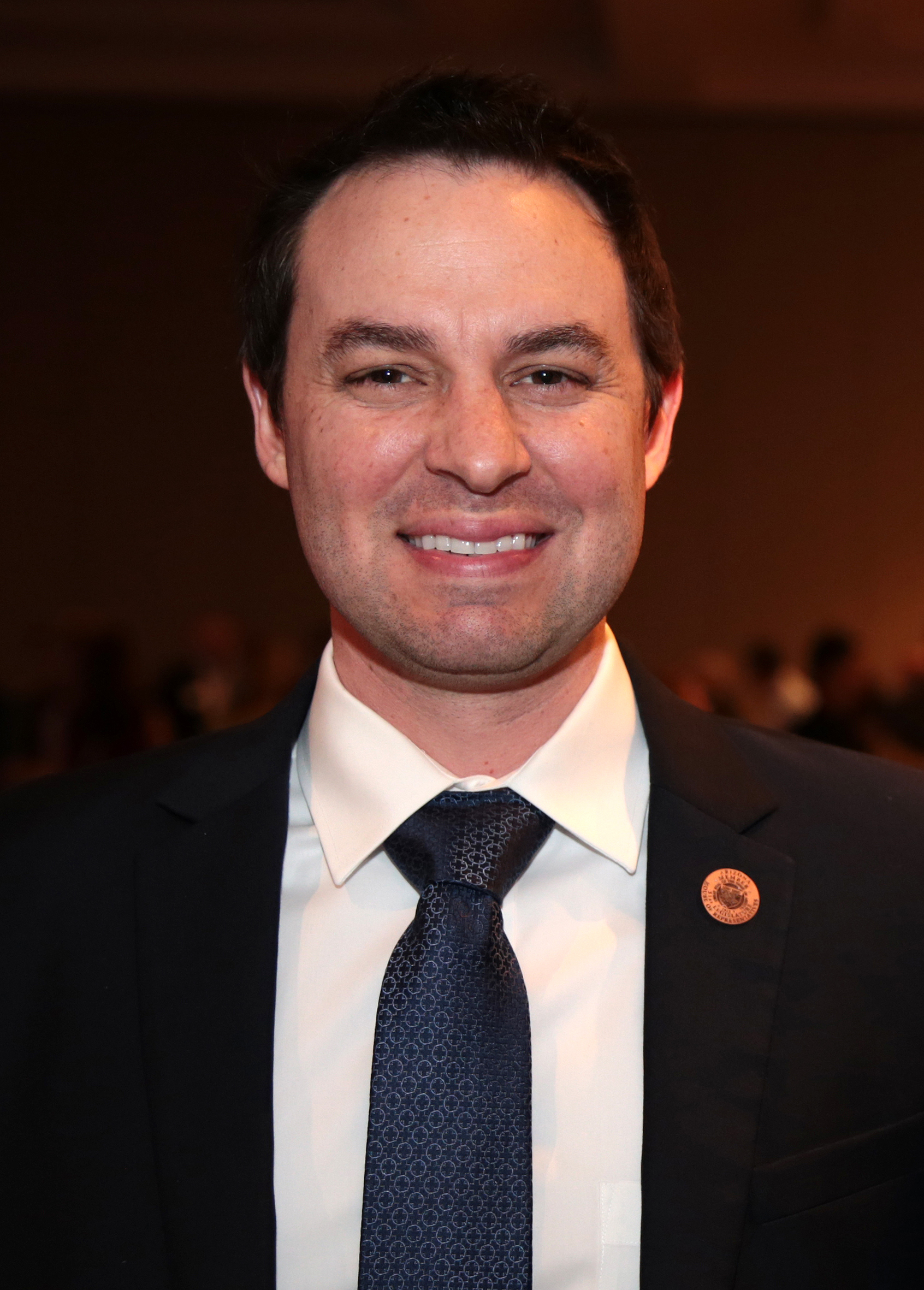

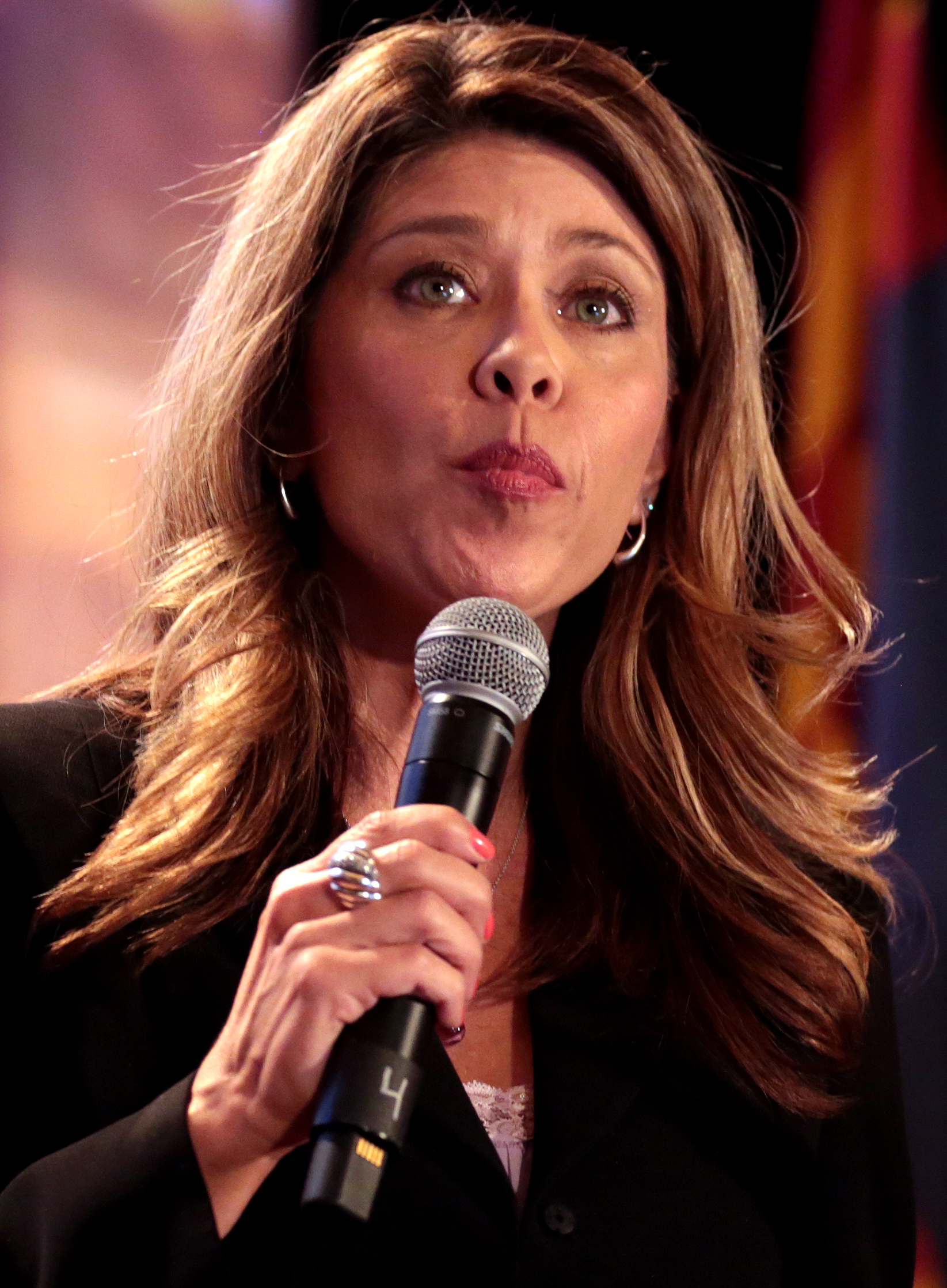
| | Majority party | Minority party |
|---|---|---|
| Leader | J.D. Mesnard (term-limited) | Rebecca Rios (retired) |
| Party | Republican | Democratic |
| Leader's seat | 17th - Chandler | 27th - Phoenix |
| Last election | 35 | 25 |
| Seats after | 31 | 29 |
| Seat change | ▼4 | ▲4 |
| Popular vote | 1,906,236 | 1,826,758 |
| Percentage | 50.57% | 48.46% |
- Results: Democratic hold Democratic gain Republican hold
Speaker before election
J.D. Mesnard
Republican
Elected Speaker
Russell "Rusty" Bowers
Republican

The 2018 Arizona House of Representatives election took place on Tuesday, November 6, 2018, with the primary election held on Tuesday, August 28, 2018. Arizona voters elected all 60 members of the Arizona House of Representatives in multi-member districts to serve two-year terms.

The election coincided with United States national elections and Arizona state elections, including U.S. Senate, U.S. House, Arizona governor and Arizona Senate.

Following the previous election in 2016, Republicans held a 35-to-25-seat majority over Democrats. Republicans maintained their majority in 2018, though the GOP majority narrowed to 31 seats. At 29 members, Democrats experienced a net gain of four seats. The newly elected members served in the 54th Arizona State Legislature, during which Republican Russell W. "Rusty" Bowers was elected Speaker of the Arizona House. (Note: Russell W. "Rusty" Bowers was elected by acclamation as Speaker for the 54th legislature.)

== Retiring incumbents ==
=== Democrats ===
1. District 3: Sally Ann Gonzales (Note: Elected to the Arizona Senate.) (term-limited)
2. District 3: Macario Saldate (term-limited)
3. District 7: Eric Descheenie
4. District 7: Wenona Benally
5. District 19: Mark Cardenas
6. District 24: Lela Alston (Note: Elected to the Arizona Senate.) (term-limited)
7. District 27: Rebecca Rios (Note: Elected to the Arizona Senate.)
8. District 30: Otoniel "Tony" Navarrete (Note: Elected to the Arizona Senate.)
9. District 30: Ray Martinez

=== Republicans ===
1. District 6: Brenda Barton (term-limited)
2. District 11: Venden "Vince" Leach (Note: Elected to the Arizona Senate.)
3. District 12: Eddie Farnsworth (Note: Elected to the Arizona Senate.) (term-limited)
4. District 14: Drew John (Note: Representative Drew John ran for Arizona Senate, but was defeated in the Republican primary election by David Gowan.)
5. District 15: Heather Carter (Note: Elected to the Arizona Senate.) (term-limited)
6. District 16: Doug Coleman
7. District 17: J.D. Mesnard (Note: Elected to the Arizona Senate.) (term-limited)
8. District 20: Paul Boyer (Note: Elected to the Arizona Senate.)
9. District 22: David Livingston (Note: Elected to the Arizona Senate.)
10. District 23: Michelle Ugenti-Rita (Note: Elected to the Arizona Senate.) (term-limited)

== Incumbents defeated in primary election ==
=== Democrat ===
1. District 24: Ken Clark

=== Republicans ===
1. District 5: Paul Mosley
2. District 13: Darin Mitchell

== Incumbents defeated in general election ==
=== Republicans ===
1. District 10: Todd Clodfelter
2. District 18: Jill Norgaard
3. District 28: Maria Syms

== Predictions ==
| Source | Ranking | As of |
|---|---|---|
| Governing | Likely R | October 8, 2018 |

== Summary of results ==
Italics denote an open seat held by the incumbent party; bold text denotes a gain for a party.

| District | Incumbent | Party | Elected representative | Outcome |
|---|---|---|---|---|
| 1st | Noel Campbell | Rep | Noel Campbell | Rep hold |
| 1st | David Stringer | Rep | David Stringer (Note: Republican representative David Stringer resigned on March 27, 2019. Steve Pierce (R) was appointed by the Yavapai County Board of Supervisors on April 3, 2019 and administered the Oath of Office on April 3, 2019.) | Rep hold |
| 2nd | Rosanna Gabaldón | Dem | Rosanna Gabaldón | Dem hold |
| 2nd | Daniel Hernandez | Dem | Daniel Hernandez | Dem hold |
| 3rd | Sally Ann Gonzales | Dem | Alma Hernandez | Dem hold |
| 3rd | Macario Saldate | Dem | Andrés Cano | Dem hold |
| 4th | Charlene Fernandez | Dem | Charlene Fernandez | Dem hold |
| 4th | Geraldine "Gerae" Peten (Note: Democratic representative Jesus Rubalcava resigned July 28, 2017. Geraldine "Gerae" Peten (D) was appointed by the Maricopa County Board of Supervisors on August 16, 2017 and sworn in on August 25, 2017 to fill the vacancy in the House in Legislative District 4.) | Dem | Geraldine "Gerae" Peten | Dem hold |
| 5th | Regina Cobb | Rep | Regina Cobb | Rep hold |
| 5th | Paul Mosley | Rep | Leo Biasiucci | Rep hold |
| 6th | Bob Thorpe | Rep | Bob Thorpe | Rep hold |
| 6th | Brenda Barton | Rep | Walter Blackman | Rep hold |
| 7th | Eric Descheenie | Dem | Myron Tsosie | Dem hold |
| 7th | Wenona Benally | Dem | Arlando Teller | Dem hold |
| 8th | Thomas "T.J." Shope | Rep | Thomas "T.J." Shope | Rep hold |
| 8th | David Cook | Rep | David Cook | Rep hold |
| 9th | Randall "Randy" Friese | Dem | Randall "Randy" Friese | Dem hold |
| 9th | Pamela Powers Hannley | Dem | Pamela Powers Hannley | Dem hold |
| 10th | Kirsten Engel | Dem | Kirsten Engel | Dem hold |
| 10th | Todd Clodfelter | Rep | **Domingo DeGrazia** | **Dem gain** |
| 11th | Mark Finchem | Rep | Mark Finchem | Rep hold |
| 11th | Venden "Vince" Leach | Rep | Bret Roberts | Rep hold |
| 12th | Travis Grantham | Rep | Travis Grantham | Rep hold |
| 12th | Eddie Farnsworth | Rep | Warren Petersen | Rep hold |
| 13th | Timothy M. "Tim" Dunn (Note: Republican representative Don Shooter was expelled on February 1, 2018 by House Resolution 2003. Timothy M. "Tim" Dunn (R) was appointed by the Yuma County Board of Supervisors on February 12, 2018 and administered the Oath of Office on February 13, 2018.) | Rep | Timothy M. "Tim" Dunn | Rep hold |
| 13th | Darin Mitchell | Rep | Joanne Osborne | Rep hold |
| 14th | Becky Nutt | Rep | Becky Nutt | Rep hold |
| 14th | Drew John | Rep | Gail Griffin | Rep hold |
| 15th | John Allen | Rep | John Allen | Rep hold |
| 15th | Heather Carter | Rep | Nancy Barto | Rep hold |
| 16th | Kelly Townsend | Rep | Kelly Townsend | Rep hold |
| 16th | Doug Coleman | Rep | John Fillmore | Rep hold |
| 17th | Jeff Weninger | Rep | Jeff Weninger | Rep hold |
| 17th | J.D. Mesnard | Rep | **Jennifer Pawlik** | **Dem gain** |
| 18th | Denise "Mitzi" Epstein | Dem | Denise "Mitzi" Epstein | Dem hold |
| 18th | Jill Norgaard | Rep | **Jennifer Jermaine** | **Dem gain** |
| 19th | Diego Espinoza | Dem | Diego Espinoza | Dem hold |
| 19th | Mark Cardenas | Dem | Lorenzo Sierra | Dem hold |
| 20th | Anthony Kern | Rep | Anthony Kern | Rep hold |
| 20th | Paul Boyer | Rep | Shawnna Bolick | Rep hold |
| 21st | Tony Rivero | Rep | Tony Rivero | Rep hold |
| 21st | Kevin Payne | Rep | Kevin Payne | Rep hold |
| 22nd | Ben Toma (Note: Republican representative Phil Lovas resigned from the House on April 17, 2017. Ben Toma (R) was appointed by the Maricopa County Board of Supervisors and sworn in on April 26, 2017 to fill the vacancy in the House in Legislative District 22.) | Rep | Ben Toma | Rep hold |
| 22nd | David Livingston | Rep | Frank Carroll | Rep hold |
| 23rd | Jay Lawrence | Rep | Jay Lawrence | Rep hold |
| 23rd | Michelle Ugenti-Rita | Rep | John Kavanagh | Rep hold |
| 24th | Lela Alston | Dem | Amish Shah | Dem hold |
| 24th | Ken Clark | Dem | Jennifer Longdon | Dem hold |
| 25th | Russell W. "Rusty" Bowers | Rep | Russell W. "Rusty" Bowers | Rep hold |
| 25th | Michelle Udall | Rep | Michelle Udall | Rep hold |
| 26th | Athena Salman | Dem | Athena Salman | Dem hold |
| 26th | Isela Blanc | Dem | Isela Blanc | Dem hold |
| 27th | Reginald Bolding | Dem | Reginald Bolding | Dem hold |
| 27th | Rebecca Rios | Dem | Diego Rodriguez | Dem hold |
| 28th | Kelli Butler | Dem | Kelli Butler | Dem hold |
| 28th | Maria Syms | Rep | **Aaron Lieberman** | **Dem gain** |
| 29th | Richard C. Andrade | Dem | Richard C. Andrade | Dem hold |
| 29th | César Chávez | Dem | César Chávez | Dem hold |
| 30th | Otoniel "Tony" Navarrete | Dem | Raquel Terán | Dem hold |
| 30th | Ray Martinez | Dem | Robert Meza | Dem hold |

== Detailed results ==
Sources for election results:

=== District 1 ===
Primary election results
| Party | Candidate | Votes | % |
Republican Party primary results
| Republican | Noel Campbell (incumbent) | 29,353 | 42.51% |
| Republican | David Stringer (incumbent) | 25,476 | 36.89% |
| Republican | Jodi Rooney | 14,223 | 20.60% |
| Total votes | | 69,052 | 100.00% |
Democratic Party primary results
| Democratic | Jan Manolis | 12,559 | 58.05% |
| Democratic | Ed Gogek | 9,076 | 41.95% |
| Total votes | | 21,635 | 100.00% |

General election results
| Party | Candidate | Votes | % |
|---|---|---|---|
| Republican | Noel Campbell (incumbent) | 70,130 | 35.08% |
| Republican | David Stringer (incumbent) | 67,023 | 33.53% |
| Democratic | Jan Manolis | 32,706 | 16.36% |
| Democratic | Ed Gogek | 30,055 | 15.03% |
| Total votes | | 199,914 | 100.00% |
| Republican hold | | | |
| Republican hold | | | |

=== District 2 ===
Primary election results
| Party | Candidate | Votes | % |
Democratic Party primary results
| Democratic | Rosanna Gabaldón (incumbent) | 12,577 | 51.04% |
| Democratic | Daniel Hernández Jr. (incumbent) | 12,066 | 48.96% |
| Total votes | | 24,643 | 100.00% |
Republican Party primary results
| Republican | John Christopher Ackerley | 9,035 | 51.29% |
| Republican | Anthony Sizer | 8,579 | 48.71% |
| Total votes | | 17,614 | 100.00% |

General election results
| Party | Candidate | Votes | % |
|---|---|---|---|
| Democratic | Daniel Hernández Jr. (incumbent) | 30,613 | 29.28% |
| Democratic | Rosanna Gabaldón (incumbent) | 30,481 | 29.15% |
| Republican | John Christopher Ackerley | 21,927 | 20.97% |
| Republican | Anthony Sizer | 21,543 | 20.60% |
| Total votes | | 104,564 | 100.00% |
| Democratic hold | | | |
| Democratic hold | | | |

=== District 3 ===
Primary election results
| Party | Candidate | Votes | % |
Democratic Party primary results
| Democratic | Andrés Cano | 10,423 | 34.92% |
| Democratic | Alma Hernandez | 9,951 | 33.33% |
| Democratic | Olivia Cajero Bedford | 9,478 | 31.75% |
| Total votes | | 29,852 | 100.00% |
Green Party primary results
| Green | Beryl Baker | 135 | 100.00% |
| Total votes | | 135 | 100.00% |

General election results
| Party | Candidate | Votes | % |
|---|---|---|---|
| Democratic | Alma Hernandez | 34,577 | 46.33% |
| Democratic | Andrés Cano | 31,482 | 42.19% |
| Green | Beryl Baker | 8,566 | 11.48% |
| Total votes | | 74,625 | 100.00% |
| Democratic hold | | | |
| Democratic hold | | | |

=== District 4 ===
Primary election results
| Party | Candidate | Votes | % |
Democratic Party primary results
| Democratic | Charlene Fernandez (incumbent) | 9,457 | 62.85% |
| Democratic | Geraldine "Gerae" Peten (incumbent) | 5,590 | 37.15% |
| Total votes | | 15,047 | 100.00% |
Green Party primary results
| Green | Sara Mae Williams | 51 | 100.00% |
| Total votes | | 51 | 100.00% |

General election results
| Party | Candidate | Votes | % |
|---|---|---|---|
| Democratic | Charlene Fernandez (incumbent) | 26,541 | 48.89% |
| Democratic | Geraldine "Gerae" Peten (incumbent) | 19,410 | 35.76% |
| Green | Sara Mae Williams | 8,334 | 15.35% |
| Total votes | | 54,285 | 100.00% |
| Democratic hold | | | |
| Democratic hold | | | |

=== District 5 ===
Primary election results
| Party | Candidate | Votes | % |
Republican Party primary results
| Republican | Regina Cobb (incumbent) | 17,998 | 37.96% |
| Republican | Leo Biasiucci | 11,780 | 24.84% |
| Republican | Paul Mosley (incumbent) | 10,611 | 22.38% |
| Republican | Jennifer Jones-Esposito | 7,021 | 14.81% |
| Republican | Sam Harrison (Note: The candidate ran a write-in campaign in this election.) | 5 | 0.01% |
| Republican | Patrick Finerd | 1 | 0.00% |
| Total votes | | 47,416 | 100.00% |
Democratic Party primary results
| Democratic | Mary McCord Robinson | 8,196 | 100.00% |
| Total votes | | 8,196 | 100.00% |

General election results
| Party | Candidate | Votes | % |
|---|---|---|---|
| Republican | Regina Cobb (incumbent) | 46,928 | 44.80% |
| Republican | Leo Biasiucci | 39,260 | 37.48% |
| Democratic | Mary McCord Robinson | 18,566 | 17.72% |
| Total votes | | 104,754 | 100.00% |
| Republican hold | | | |
| Republican hold | | | |

=== District 6 ===
Primary election results
| Party | Candidate | Votes | % |
Republican Party primary results
| Republican | Bob Thorpe (incumbent) | 16,512 | 41.06% |
| Republican | Walter "Walt" Blackman | 15,059 | 37.45% |
| Republican | Stuart McDaniel | 8,640 | 21.49% |
| Total votes | | 40,211 | 100.00% |
Democratic Party primary results
| Democratic | Felicia French | 16,431 | 59.15% |
| Democratic | Bobby Tyler | 11,348 | 40.85% |
| Total votes | | 27,779 | 100.00% |

General election results
| Party | Candidate | Votes | % |
|---|---|---|---|
| Republican | Walter "Walt" Blackman | 45,210 | 26.45% |
| Republican | Bob Thorpe (incumbent) | 44,314 | 25.93% |
| Democratic | Felicia French | 43,737 | 25.59% |
| Democratic | Bobby Tyler | 37,656 | 22.03% |
| Total votes | | 170,917 | 100.00% |
| Republican hold | | | |
| Republican hold | | | |

=== District 7 ===
Primary election results
| Party | Candidate | Votes | % |
Democratic Party primary results
| Democratic | Myron Tsosie | 19,257 | 63.06% |
| Democratic | Arlando Teller | 11,282 | 36.94% |
| Total votes | | 30,539 | 100.00% |
Republican Party primary results
| Republican | Doyel Shamley | 9,920 | 100.00% |
| Total votes | | 9,920 | 100.00% |

General election results
| Party | Candidate | Votes | % |
|---|---|---|---|
| Democratic | Myron Tsosie | 34,739 | 41.24% |
| Democratic | Arlando Teller | 26,810 | 31.83% |
| Republican | Doyel Shamley | 22,677 | 26.92% |
| Total votes | | 84,226 | 100.00% |
| Democratic hold | | | |
| Democratic hold | | | |

=== District 8 ===
Primary election results
| Party | Candidate | Votes | % |
Republican Party primary results
| Republican | Thomas "T.J." Shope (incumbent) | 10,432 | 50.90% |
| Republican | David Cook (incumbent) | 10,062 | 49.10% |
| Total votes | | 20,494 | 100.00% |
Democratic Party primary results
| Democratic | Carmen Casillas | 6,916 | 39.56% |
| Democratic | Linda C. Gross | 5,343 | 30.56% |
| Democratic | Pablo Correa | 5,222 | 29.87% |
| Total votes | | 17,481 | 100.00% |

General election results
| Party | Candidate | Votes | % |
|---|---|---|---|
| Republican | David Cook (incumbent) | 28,421 | 29.22% |
| Republican | Thomas "T.J." Shope (incumbent) | 28,150 | 28.94% |
| Democratic | Carmen Casillas | 21,171 | 21.76% |
| Democratic | Linda C. Gross | 19,530 | 20.08% |
| Total votes | | 97,272 | 100.00% |
| Republican hold | | | |
| Republican hold | | | |

=== District 9 ===
Primary election results
| Party | Candidate | Votes | % |
Democratic Party primary results
| Democratic | Randall "Randy" Friese (incumbent) | 20,365 | 45.37% |
| Democratic | Pamela Powers Hannley (incumbent) | 19,392 | 43.20% |
| Democratic | JP Martin | 5,127 | 11.42% |
| Total votes | | 44,884 | 100.00% |
Republican Party primary results
| Republican | Ana Henderson | 17,193 | 100.00% |
| Total votes | | 17,193 | 100.00% |

General election results
| Party | Candidate | Votes | % |
|---|---|---|---|
| Democratic | Randall "Randy" Friese (incumbent) | 49,755 | 36.75% |
| Democratic | Pamela Powers Hannley (incumbent) | 49,011 | 36.20% |
| Republican | Ana Henderson | 36,613 | 27.04% |
| Total votes | | 135,379 | 100.00% |
| Democratic hold | | | |
| Democratic hold | | | |

=== District 10 ===
Primary election results
| Party | Candidate | Votes | % |
Democratic Party primary results
| Democratic | Kirsten Engel (incumbent) | 16,895 | 39.38% |
| Democratic | Domingo DeGrazia | 9,000 | 20.98% |
| Democratic | Nikki Lee | 8,585 | 20.01% |
| Democratic | Catherine Ripley | 8,421 | 19.63% |
| Total votes | | 42,901 | 100.00% |
Republican Party primary results
| Republican | Todd Clodfelter (incumbent) | 18,673 | 100.00% |
| Total votes | | 18,673 | 100.00% |
Green Party primary results
| Green | Joshua Reilly | 25 | 100.00% |
| Total votes | | 25 | 100.00% |

General election results
| Party | Candidate | Votes | % |
|---|---|---|---|
| Democratic | Kirsten Engel (incumbent) | 49,163 | 35.50% |
| Democratic | Domingo DeGrazia | 42,716 | 30.85% |
| Republican | Todd Clodfelter (incumbent) | 38,697 | 27.95% |
| Green | Joshua Reilly | 7,896 | 5.70% |
| Total votes | | 138,472 | 100.00% |
| Democratic hold | | | |
| Democratic gain from Republican | | | |

=== District 11 ===
Primary election results
| Party | Candidate | Votes | % |
Republican Party primary results
| Republican | Mark Finchem (incumbent) | 18,977 | 43.87% |
| Republican | Bret Roberts | 16,246 | 37.56% |
| Republican | Howell "Jonesy" Jones | 8,030 | 18.57% |
| Total votes | | 43,253 | 100.00% |
Democratic Party primary results
| Democratic | Hollace Lyon | 12,374 | 42.56% |
| Democratic | Marcela Quiroz | 12,283 | 42.24% |
| Democratic | Barry McCain | 4,420 | 15.20% |
| Total votes | | 29,077 | 100.00% |

General election results
| Party | Candidate | Votes | % |
|---|---|---|---|
| Republican | Bret Roberts | 48,676 | 28.22% |
| Republican | Mark Finchem (incumbent) | 48,563 | 28.15% |
| Democratic | Hollace Lyon | 37,992 | 22.02% |
| Democratic | Marcela Quiroz | 37,265 | 21.60% |
| Total votes | | 172,496 | 100.00% |
| Republican hold | | | |
| Republican hold | | | |

=== District 12 ===
Primary election results
| Party | Candidate | Votes | % |
Republican Party primary results
| Republican | Warren Petersen | 17,049 | 33.25% |
| Republican | Travis Grantham (incumbent) | 15,556 | 30.34% |
| Republican | Blake Sacha | 10,882 | 21.22% |
| Republican | Nick Myers | 7,787 | 15.19% |
| Total votes | | 51,274 | 100.00% |
Democratic Party primary results
| Democratic | Lynsey Robinson | 9,638 | 45.09% |
| Democratic | Joe Bisaccia | 8,106 | 37.92% |
| Democratic | D. J. Rothans | 3,632 | 16.99% |
| Total votes | | 21,376 | 100.00% |

General election results
| Party | Candidate | Votes | % |
|---|---|---|---|
| Republican | Warren Petersen | 59,095 | 30.23% |
| Republican | Travis Grantham (incumbent) | 58,928 | 30.15% |
| Democratic | Lynsey Robinson | 39,841 | 20.38% |
| Democratic | Joe Bisaccia | 37,597 | 19.24% |
| Total votes | | 195,461 | 100.00% |
| Republican hold | | | |
| Republican hold | | | |

=== District 13 ===
Primary election results
| Party | Candidate | Votes | % |
Republican Party primary results
| Republican | Timothy "Tim" Dunn (incumbent) | 15,303 | 36.83% |
| Republican | Joanne Osborne | 9,879 | 23.77% |
| Republican | Darin Mitchell (incumbent) | 8,639 | 20.79% |
| Republican | Trey Terry | 7,735 | 18.61% |
| Total votes | | 41,556 | 100.00% |
Democratic Party primary results
| Democratic | Thomas Tzitzura | 10,853 | 100.00% |
| Total votes | | 10,853 | 100.00% |

General election results
| Party | Candidate | Votes | % |
|---|---|---|---|
| Republican | Timothy "Tim" Dunn (incumbent) | 46,602 | 39.19% |
| Republican | Joanne Osborne | 43,780 | 36.82% |
| Democratic | Thomas Tzitzura | 28,523 | 23.99% |
| Total votes | | 118,905 | 100.00% |
| Republican hold | | | |
| Republican hold | | | |

=== District 14 ===
Primary election results
| Party | Candidate | Votes | % |
Republican Party primary results
| Republican | Gail Griffin | 21,414 | 52.66% |
| Republican | Becky Nutt (incumbent) | 19,253 | 47.34% |
| Total votes | | 40,667 | 100.00% |
Democratic Party primary results
| Democratic | Shelley Renne-Leon | 11,149 | 52.74% |
| Democratic | Bob Karp | 9,989 | 47.26% |
| Total votes | | 21,138 | 100.00% |

General election results
| Party | Candidate | Votes | % |
|---|---|---|---|
| Republican | Gail Griffin | 46,797 | 32.69% |
| Republican | Becky Nutt (incumbent) | 46,155 | 32.24% |
| Democratic | Shelley Renne-Leon | 25,651 | 17.92% |
| Democratic | Bob Karp | 24,539 | 17.14% |
| Total votes | | 143,142 | 100.000% |
| Republican hold | | | |
| Republican hold | | | |

=== District 15 ===
Primary election results
| Party | Candidate | Votes | % |
Republican Party primary results
| Republican | Nancy Barto | 19,196 | 52.79% |
| Republican | John Allen (incumbent) | 17,164 | 47.21% |
| Total votes | | 36,360 | 100.00% |
Democratic Party primary results
| Democratic | Jennifer Samuels | 7,977 | 34.58% |
| Democratic | Julie Gunnigle | 7,904 | 34.26% |
| Democratic | Tonya MacBeth | 7,189 | 31.16% |
| Total votes | | 23,070 | 100.00% |

General election results
| Party | Candidate | Votes | % |
|---|---|---|---|
| Republican | Nancy Barto | 51,305 | 29.08% |
| Republican | John Allen (incumbent) | 49,279 | 27.93% |
| Democratic | Jennifer Samuels | 38,565 | 21.86% |
| Democratic | Julie Gunnigle | 37,308 | 21.14% |
| Total votes | | 176,457 | 100.00% |
| Republican hold | | | |
| Republican hold | | | |

=== District 16 ===
Primary election results
| Party | Candidate | Votes | % |
Republican Party primary results
| Republican | Kelly Townsend (incumbent) | 14,361 | 33.43% |
| Republican | John Fillmore | 9,407 | 21.90% |
| Republican | Lisa Godzich | 8,475 | 19.73% |
| Republican | Tara Phelps | 6,951 | 16.18% |
| Republican | Stephen Kridler | 3,758 | 8.75% |
| Total votes | | 42,952 | 100.00% |
Democratic Party primary results
| Democratic | Sharon Stinard | 11,897 | 100.00% |
| Total votes | | 11,897 | 100.00% |
Green Party primary results
| Green | Richard Grayson | 2 | 100.00% |
| Total votes | | 2 | 100.00% |

General election results
| Party | Candidate | Votes | % |
|---|---|---|---|
| Republican | Kelly Townsend (incumbent) | 49,643 | 35.64% |
| Republican | John Fillmore | 46,000 | 33.02% |
| Democratic | Sharon Stinard | 32,018 | 22.98% |
| Green | Richard Grayson | 11,646 | 8.36% |
| Total votes | | 139,307 | 100.00% |
| Republican hold | | | |
| Republican hold | | | |

=== District 17 ===
Primary election results
| Party | Candidate | Votes | % |
Republican Party primary results
| Republican | Jeff Weninger (incumbent) | 17,488 | 44.73% |
| Republican | Nora Ellen | 13,800 | 35.30% |
| Republican | Julie Willoughby | 7,808 | 19.97% |
| Total votes | | 39,096 | 100.00% |
Democratic Party primary results
| Democratic | Jennifer Pawlik | 15,757 | 100.00% |
| Total votes | | 15,757 | 100.00% |

General election results
| Party | Candidate | Votes | % |
|---|---|---|---|
| Democratic | Jennifer Pawlik | 46,874 | 34.26% |
| Republican | Jeff Weninger (incumbent) | 46,520 | 34.00% |
| Republican | Nora Ellen | 43,437 | 31.74% |
| Total votes | | 136,831 | 100.00% |
| Democratic gain from Republican | | | |
| Republican hold | | | |

=== District 18 ===
Primary election results
| Party | Candidate | Votes | % |
Democratic Party primary results
| Democratic | Denise "Mitzi" Epstein (incumbent) | 15,486 | 43.75% |
| Democratic | Jennifer Jermaine | 13,150 | 37.15% |
| Democratic | LaDawn Stuben | 6,763 | 19.11% |
| Total votes | | 35,399 | 100.00% |
Republican Party primary results
| Republican | Jill Norgaard (incumbent) | 16,290 | 44.23% |
| Republican | Greg Patterson | 9,230 | 25.06% |
| Republican | Farhana Shifa | 6,910 | 18.76% |
| Republican | Don Hawker | 4,401 | 11.95% |
| Total votes | | 36,831 | 100.00% |

General election results
| Party | Candidate | Votes | % |
|---|---|---|---|
| Democratic | Denise "Mitzi" Epstein (incumbent) | 52,992 | 28.32% |
| Democratic | Jennifer Jermaine | 50,253 | 26.86% |
| Republican | Jill Norgaard (incumbent) | 44,269 | 23.66% |
| Republican | Greg Patterson | 39,578 | 21.15% |
| Total votes | | 187,092 | 100.00% |
| Democratic hold | | | |
| Democratic gain from Republican | | | |

=== District 19 ===
Primary election results
| Party | Candidate | Votes | % |
Democratic Party primary results
| Democratic | Diego Espinoza (incumbent) | 6,080 | 42.56% |
| Democratic | Lorenzo Sierra | 4,524 | 31.67% |
| Democratic | Devin Del Palacio | 3,681 | 25.77% |
| Total votes | | 14,285 | 100.00% |

General election results
| Party | Candidate | Votes | % |
|---|---|---|---|
| Democratic | Diego Espinoza (incumbent) | 26,428 | 53.12% |
| Democratic | Lorenzo Sierra | 23,319 | 46.88% |
| Total votes | | 49,747 | 100.00% |
| Democratic hold | | | |
| Democratic hold | | | |

=== District 20 ===
Primary election results
| Party | Candidate | Votes | % |
Republican Party primary results
| Republican | Anthony Kern (incumbent) | 13,801 | 56.83% |
| Republican | Shawnna Bolick | 10,483 | 43.17% |
| Total votes | | 24,284 | 100.00% |
Democratic Party primary results
| Democratic | Hazel Chandler | 8,429 | 37.73% |
| Democratic | Christopher "Chris" Gilfillan | 6,053 | 27.10% |
| Democratic | Patrick Church | 4,987 | 22.33% |
| Democratic | Dan Anderson | 2,869 | 12.84% |
| Total votes | | 22,338 | 100.00% |

General election results
| Party | Candidate | Votes | % |
|---|---|---|---|
| Republican | Anthony Kern (incumbent) | 34,249 | 26.16% |
| Republican | Shawnna Bolick | 33,848 | 25.85% |
| Democratic | Hazel Chandler | 31,979 | 24.42% |
| Democratic | Christopher "Chris" Gilfillan | 30,855 | 23.57% |
| Total votes | | 130,931 | 100.00% |
| Republican hold | | | |
| Republican hold | | | |

=== District 21 ===
Primary election results
| Party | Candidate | Votes | % |
Republican Party primary results
| Republican | Kevin Payne (incumbent) | 18,543 | 59.03% |
| Republican | Tony Rivero (incumbent) | 12,870 | 40.97% |
| Total votes | | 31,413 | 100.00% |
Democratic Party primary results
| Democratic | Gilbert Romero | 11,140 | 52.30% |
| Democratic | Bradley Hughes | 10,161 | 47.70% |
| Total votes | | 21,301 | 100.00% |

General election results
| Party | Candidate | Votes | % |
|---|---|---|---|
| Republican | Kevin Payne (incumbent) | 41,536 | 28.86% |
| Republican | Tony Rivero (incumbent) | 39,275 | 27.29% |
| Democratic | Gilbert Romero | 31,756 | 22.07% |
| Democratic | Bradley Hughes | 31,348 | 21.78% |
| Total votes | | 143,915 | 100.00% |
| Republican hold | | | |
| Republican hold | | | |

=== District 22 ===
Primary election results
| Party | Candidate | Votes | % |
Republican Party primary results
| Republican | Ben Toma (incumbent) | 21,502 | 34.50% |
| Republican | Frank Carroll | 16,599 | 26.63% |
| Republican | Matt Bullock | 14,084 | 22.60% |
| Republican | John Heep | 10,142 | 16.27% |
| Total votes | | 62,327 | 100.00% |
Democratic Party primary results
| Democratic | Valerie Harris | 13,418 | 55.46% |
| Democratic | Teri Sarmiento | 10,778 | 44.54% |
| Total votes | | 24,196 | 100.00% |

General election results
| Party | Candidate | Votes | % |
|---|---|---|---|
| Republican | Ben Toma (incumbent) | 65,310 | 31.58% |
| Republican | Frank Carroll | 64,729 | 31.30% |
| Democratic | Teri Sarmiento | 38,895 | 18.81% |
| Democratic | Valerie Harris | 37,832 | 18.30% |
| Republican | Ron Ha'o | 11 | 0.01% |
| Total votes | | 206,777 | 100.00% |
| Republican hold | | | |
| Republican hold | | | |

=== District 23 ===
Primary election results
| Party | Candidate | Votes | % |
Republican Party primary results
| Republican | John Kavanagh | 27,994 | 55.71% |
| Republican | Jay Lawrence (incumbent) | 22,256 | 44.29% |
| Total votes | | 50,250 | 100.00% |
Democratic Party primary results
| Democratic | Eric Kurland | 18,677 | 100.00% |
| Total votes | | 18,677 | 100.00% |

General election results
| Party | Candidate | Votes | % |
|---|---|---|---|
| Republican | John Kavanagh | 62,797 | 36.55% |
| Republican | Jay Lawrence (incumbent) | 57,099 | 33.24% |
| Democratic | Eric Kurland | 51,893 | 30.21% |
| Total votes | | 171,789 | 100.00% |
| Republican hold | | | |
| Republican hold | | | |

=== District 24 ===
Primary election results
| Party | Candidate | Votes | % |
Democratic Party primary results
| Democratic | Amish Shah | 10,820 | 28.58% |
| Democratic | Jennifer Longdon | 8,041 | 21.24% |
| Democratic | Ken Clark (incumbent) | 6,890 | 18.20% |
| Democratic | Denise Link | 3,605 | 9.52% |
| Democratic | Marcus Ferrell | 3,402 | 8.98% |
| Democratic | John Glenn | 3,377 | 8.92% |
| Democratic | Fred Dominguez | 1,730 | 4.57% |
| Total votes | | 37,865 | 100.00% |
Republican Party primary results
| Republican | David Alger Sr. | 7,431 | 100.00% |
| Total votes | | 7,431 | 100.00% |

General election results
| Party | Candidate | Votes | % |
|---|---|---|---|
| Democratic | Jennifer Longdon | 40,520 | 41.03% |
| Democratic | Amish Shah | 39,363 | 39.86% |
| Republican | David Alger Sr. | 18,853 | 19.09% |
| Libertarian | Christopher Karpurk | 21 | 0.02% |
| Total votes | | 98,757 | 100.00% |
| Democratic hold | | | |
| Democratic hold | | | |

=== District 25 ===
Primary election results
| Party | Candidate | Votes | % |
Republican Party primary results
| Republican | Russell W. "Rusty" Bowers (incumbent) | 20,522 | 43.33% |
| Republican | Michelle Udall (incumbent) | 17,759 | 37.50% |
| Republican | Marlene Hinton | 9,081 | 19.17% |
| Total votes | | 47,362 | 100.00% |
Democratic Party primary results
| Democratic | Johnny Martin | 12,286 | 100.00% |
| Total votes | | 12,286 | 100.00% |

General election results
| Party | Candidate | Votes | % |
|---|---|---|---|
| Republican | Michelle Udall (incumbent) | 52,075 | 39.85% |
| Republican | Russell W. "Rusty" Bowers (incumbent) | 47,067 | 36.02% |
| Democratic | Johnny Martin | 31,540 | 24.13% |
| Total votes | | 130,682 | 100.00% |
| Republican hold | | | |
| Republican hold | | | |

=== District 26 ===
Primary election results
| Party | Candidate | Votes | % |
Democratic Party primary results
| Democratic | Athena Salman (incumbent) | 9,672 | 50.33% |
| Democratic | Isela Blanc (incumbent) | 9,545 | 49.67% |
| Total votes | | 19,217 | 100.00% |
Republican Party primary results
| Republican | Raymond D. Speakman | 6,834 | 100.00% |
| Total votes | | 6,834 | 100.00% |

General election results
| Party | Candidate | Votes | % |
|---|---|---|---|
| Democratic | Athena Salman (incumbent) | 29,540 | 39.78% |
| Democratic | Isela Blanc (incumbent) | 28,039 | 37.76% |
| Republican | Raymond D. Speakman | 16,676 | 22.46% |
| Total votes | | 74,255 | 100.00% |
| Democratic hold | | | |
| Democratic hold | | | |

=== District 27 ===
Primary election results
| Party | Candidate | Votes | % |
Democratic Party primary results
| Democratic | Reginald Bolding (incumbent) | 8,226 | 35.49% |
| Democratic | Diego Rodriguez | 5,304 | 22.88% |
| Democratic | Roberto Sanchez Garcia | 4,964 | 21.42% |
| Democratic | Talonya Adams | 4,683 | 20.21% |
| Total votes | | 23,177 | 100.00% |
Libertarian Party primary results
| Libertarian | Robert Pepiton (Note: Despite coming in first place in the Libertarian primary as a write-in candidate, Robert Pepiton did not advance to the general election.) | 47 | 100.00% |
| Total votes | | 47 | 100.00% |

General election results
| Party | Candidate | Votes | % |
|---|---|---|---|
| Democratic | Diego Rodriguez | 31,521 | 52.60% |
| Democratic | Reginald Bolding (incumbent) | 28,360 | 47.32% |
| Nonpartisan | Julian "Jul" Szymanski | 47 | 0.08% |
| Total votes | | 59,928 | 100.00% |
| Democratic hold | | | |
| Democratic hold | | | |

=== District 28 ===
Primary election results
| Party | Candidate | Votes | % |
Democratic Party primary results
| Democratic | Kelli Butler (incumbent) | 17,298 | 57.28% |
| Democratic | Aaron Lieberman | 12,903 | 42.72% |
| Total votes | | 30,201 | 100.00% |
Republican Party primary results
| Republican | Maria Syms (incumbent) | 16,240 | 53.60% |
| Republican | Kathy Pappas Petsas | 14,058 | 46.40% |
| Total votes | | 30,298 | 100.00% |

General election results
| Party | Candidate | Votes | % |
|---|---|---|---|
| Democratic | Kelli Butler (incumbent) | 48,003 | 27.90% |
| Democratic | Aaron Lieberman | 43,196 | 25.11% |
| Republican | Maria Syms (incumbent) | 40,798 | 23.71% |
| Republican | Kathy Pappas Petsas | 40,064 | 23.28% |
| Total votes | | 172,061 | 100.00% |
| Democratic hold | | | |
| Democratic gain from Republican | | | |

=== District 29 ===
Primary election results
| Party | Candidate | Votes | % |
Democratic Party primary results
| Democratic | Cesar Chavez (incumbent) | 5,995 | 52.14% |
| Democratic | Richard Andrade (incumbent) | 5,503 | 47.86% |
| Total votes | | 11,498 | 100.00% |

General election results
| Party | Candidate | Votes | % |
|---|---|---|---|
| Democratic | Cesar Chavez (incumbent) | 23,631 | 55.10% |
| Democratic | Richard Andrade (incumbent) | 19,258 | 44.90% |
| Total votes | | 42,889 | 100.00% |
| Democratic hold | | | |
| Democratic hold | | | |

=== District 30 ===
Primary election results
| Party | Candidate | Votes | % |
Democratic Party primary results
| Democratic | Robert Meza | 5,401 | 31.07% |
| Democratic | Raquel Terán | 5,380 | 30.94% |
| Democratic | Alejandro Larios | 3,514 | 20.21% |
| Democratic | Bill Brotherton | 3,091 | 17.78% |
| Total votes | | 17,386 | 100.00% |
Republican Party primary results
| Republican | Gary Spears | 5,281 | 100.00% |
| Total votes | | 5,281 | 100.00% |

General election results
| Party | Candidate | Votes | % |
|---|---|---|---|
| Democratic | Raquel Terán | 20,831 | 39.34% |
| Democratic | Robert Meza | 19,794 | 37.38% |
| Republican | Gary Spears | 12,329 | 23.28% |
| Total votes | | 52,954 | 100.00% |
| Democratic hold | | | |
| Democratic hold | | | |

== See also ==
- 2018 United States elections
- 2018 United States Senate election in Arizona
- 2018 United States House of Representatives elections in Arizona
- 2018 Arizona elections
- 2018 Arizona gubernatorial election
- 2018 Arizona Secretary of State election
- 2018 Arizona Attorney General election
- 2018 Arizona Superintendent of Public Instruction election
- 2018 Arizona Senate election
- 54th Arizona State Legislature
- Arizona House of Representatives
