= 54th Arizona State Legislature =

Session of the Arizona Legislature

←	53rd	55th	→
- Arizona State Capitol (2014)

Overview
- Legislative body: Arizona State Legislature
- Jurisdiction: Arizona, United States
- Term: January 1, 2019 – December 31, 2020

Senate
- Members: 30
- President: A Lieutenant Governor Karen Fann
- Temporary President: Eddie Farnsworth
- Party control: Republican (17–13)

House of Representatives
- Members: 60
- Speaker: Russell Bowers
- Party control: Republican (31–29)

Sessions
- 1st: January 14 – May 28, 2019
- 2nd: January 13 – May 26, 2020

The 54th Arizona State Legislature, consisting of the Arizona State Senate and the Arizona House of Representatives, was constituted in Phoenix from January 1, 2019 to December 31, 2020, during the first two years of Doug Ducey's second full term in office. Both the Senate and the House membership remained constant at 30 and 60, respectively. Following the November 2018 election, Senate balance was unchanged, leaving the Republicans with a 17–13 majority. Republicans also maintained an 31–29 majority in the House after losing four seats to the Democrats.

== Sessions ==
The Legislature met for two regular sessions at the State Capitol in Phoenix. The first opened on January 14, 2019, and adjourned on May 28, while the Second Regular Session convened on January 13, 2020 and adjourned sine die on May 26.

There were no Special Sessions.

== State Senate ==
=== Members ===
The asterisk (*) denotes members of the previous Legislature who continued in office as members of this Legislature.

District	Senator	Party	Notes
1	Karen Fann*	Republican	
2	Andrea Dalessandro*	Democrat	
3	Sally Ann Gonzales	Democrat	
4	Lisa Otondo*	Democrat	
5	Sonny Borrelli*	Republican	
6	Sylvia Allen*	Republican	
7	Jamescita Peshlakai*	Democrat	
8	Frank Pratt*	Republican	
9	Victoria Steele	Democrat	
10	David Bradley*	Democrat	
11	Vince Leach	Republican	
12	Eddie Farnsworth	Republican	
13	Sine Kerr*	Republican	
14	David Gowan*	Republican	
15	Heather Carter	Republican	
16	Dave Farnsworth*	Republican	
17	J.D. Mesnard	Republican	
18	Sean Bowie*	Democrat	
19	Lupe Contreras*	Democrat	
20	Paul Boyer	Republican	
21	Rick Gray*	Republican	
22	David Livingston	Republican	
23	Michelle Ugenti	Republican	
24	Lela Alston	Democrat	
25	Tyler Pace	Republican	
26	Juan Mendez*	Democrat	
27	Rebecca Rios	Democrat	
28	Kate Brophy McGee*	Republican	
29	Martin Quezada*	Democrat	
30	Tony Navarrete	Democrat	

== House of Representatives ==
=== Members ===
The asterisk (*) denotes members of the previous Legislature who continued in office as members of this Legislature.

District	Representative	Party	Notes
1	David Stringer*	Republican	Resigned March 27, 2019
1	Steve Pierce	Republican	Appointed April 3, 2019
1	Noel W. Campbell*	Republican	
2	Daniel Hernandez Jr.*	Democrat	
2	Rosanna Gabaldon*	Democrat	
3	Alma Hernandez	Democrat	
3	Andrés Cano	Democrat	
4	Charlene Fernandez*	Democrat	
4	Geraldine Peten*	Democrat	
5	Leo Biasiucci	Republican	
5	Regina Cobb*	Republican	
6	Walter Blackman	Republican	
6	Bob Thorpe*	Republican	
7	Arlando Teller	Democrat	
7	Myron Tsosie	Democrat	
8	David Cook*	Republican	
8	T. J. Shope*	Republican	
9	Pamela Hannley*	Democrat	
9	Randall Friese*	Democrat	
10	Kirsten Engel	Democrat	
10	Domingo DeGrazia	Democrat	
11	Mark Finchem*	Republican	
11	Bret Roberts	Republican	
12	Warren Petersen	Republican	
12	Travis Grantham*	Republican	
13	Joanne Osborne	Republican	
13	Tim Dunn*	Republican	
14	Becky Nutt*	Republican	
14	Gail Griffin	Republican	
15	John Allen*	Republican	
15	Nancy Barto	Republican	
16	John Fillmore	Republican	
16	Kelly Townsend*	Republican	
17	Jeff Weninger*	Republican	
17	Jennifer Pawlik	Democrat	
18	Jennifer Jermaine	Democrat	
18	Denise Epstein*	Democrat	
19	Lorenzo Sierra	Democrat	
19	Diego Espinoza*	Democrat	
20	Shawnna Bolick	Republican	
20	Anthony Kern*	Republican	
21	Kevin Payne*	Republican	
21	Tony Rivero*	Republican	
22	Frank Carroll	Republican	
22	Ben Toma*	Republican	
23	Jay Lawrence*	Republican	
23	John Kavanagh	Republican	
24	Jennifer Longdon	Democrat	
24	Amish Shah	Democrat	
25	Michelle Udall*	Republican	
25	Russell Bowers*	Republican	
26	Isela Blanc*	Democrat	
26	Athena Salman*	Democrat	
27	Reginald Bolding*	Democrat	
27	Diego Rodriguez	Democrat	
28	Kelli Butler*	Democrat	
28	Aaron Lieberman	Democrat	
29	Richard C. Andrade*	Democrat	
29	Cesar Chavez*	Democrat	
30	Robert Meza	Democrat	
30	Raquel Terán	Democrat	
