= 55th Arizona State Legislature =

Session of the Arizona Legislature

←	54th	56th	→
- Arizona State Capitol (2014)

Overview
- Legislative body: Arizona State Legislature
- Jurisdiction: Arizona, United States
- Term: January 1, 2021 – December 31, 2022

Senate
- Members: 30
- President: Karen Fann
- Temporary President: Vince Leach
- Party control: Republican (16–14)

House of Representatives
- Members: 60
- Speaker: Russell Bowers
- Party control: Republican (31–29)

Sessions
- 1st: January 11, 2021 – June 30, 2021
- 2nd: January 10, 2022 – June 25, 2022

Special sessions
- 1st: June 15 – June 17, 2021

The 55th Arizona State Legislature, consisting of the Arizona Senate and the Arizona House of Representatives was the legislative session constituted in Phoenix on January 11, 2021, during the second two years of Doug Ducey's second full term in office. Both the Senate and the House membership remained constant at 30 and 60, respectively. In the November 2020 Senate election, Democrats gained one seat, leaving the Republicans with a 16–14 majority. Republicans maintained an unchanged 31–29 majority in the House after the November 2020 House election.

== Sessions ==
The Legislature met in its first regular session at the State Capitol in Phoenix. The session opened on January 11, 2021, and adjourned sine die on June 30, 2021.

The second regular session began on January 10, 2022, adjourning on June 25, 2022.

There has been one special session, extending from June 15 through June 17, 2021, to address wildfire emergency funding.

== Senate ==
=== Members ===
The asterisk (*) denotes members of the previous Legislature who continued in office as members of this Legislature.

District	Senator	Party	Notes
1	Karen Fann*	Republican	
2	Rosanna Gabaldon	Democrat	
3	Sally Ann Gonzales*	Democrat	
4	Lisa Otondo*	Democrat	
5	Sonny Borrelli*	Republican	
6	Wendy Rogers	Republican	
7	Jamescita Peshlakai*	Democrat	Resigned December 22, 2021
7	Theresa Hatathlie	Democrat	Appointed January 6, 2022
8	T. J. Shope	Republican	
9	Victoria Steele*	Democrat	
10	Kirsten Engel	Democrat	Resigned September 8, 2021
10	Stephanie Stahl Hamilton	Democrat	Appointed October 20, 2021
11	Vince Leach*	Republican	
12	Warren Petersen	Republican	
13	Sine Kerr*	Republican	
14	David Gowan*	Republican	
15	Nancy Barto	Republican	
16	Kelly Townsend	Republican	
17	J.D. Mesnard*	Republican	
18	Sean Bowie*	Democrat	
19	Lupe Contreras*	Democrat	
20	Paul Boyer*	Republican	
21	Rick Gray*	Republican	
22	David Livingston*	Republican	
23	Michelle Ugenti*	Republican	
24	Lela Alston*	Democrat	
25	Tyler Pace*	Republican	
26	Juan Mendez*	Democrat	
27	Rebecca Rios*	Democrat	
28	Christine Marsh	Democrat	
29	Martin Quezada*	Democrat	
30	Tony Navarrete*	Democrat	Resigned August 10, 2021
30	Raquel Terán	Democrat	Appointed September 15, 2021

== House of Representatives ==
=== Members ===
The asterisk (*) denotes members of the previous Legislature who continued in office as members of this Legislature.

District	Representative	Party	Notes
1	Quang Nguyen	Republican	
1	Judy Burges	Republican	
2	Daniel Hernandez Jr.*	Democrat	
2	Andrea Dalessandro	Democrat	
3	Alma Hernandez*	Democrat	
3	Andrés Cano*	Democrat	
4	Charlene Fernandez*	Democrat	Resigned November 15, 2021
4	Brian Fernandez	Democrat	Appointed November 22, 2021
4	Joel John	Republican	
5	Leo Biasiucci*	Republican	
5	Regina Cobb*	Republican	
6	Walter Blackman*	Republican	
6	Brenda Barton	Republican	
7	Arlando Teller*	Democrat	
7	Myron Tsosie*	Democrat	
8	David Cook*	Republican	
8	Frank Pratt	Republican	Died September 21, 2021
8	Neal Carter	Republican	Appointed October 27, 2021
9	Pamela Hannley*	Democrat	
9	Randall Friese*	Democrat	Resigned November 15, 2021
9	Christopher Mathis	Democrat	Appointed December 7, 2021
10	Stephanie Stahl Hamilton	Democrat	Appointed to Arizona Senate October 20, 2021
10	Morgan Abraham	Democrat	Appointed December 7, 2021
10	Domingo DeGrazia	Democrat	
11	Mark Finchem*	Republican	
11	Bret Roberts*	Republican	Resigned September 30, 2021
11	Teresa Martinez	Republican	Appointed October 27, 2021
12	Jake Hoffman	Republican	
12	Travis Grantham*	Republican	
13	Joanne Osborne*	Republican	
13	Tim Dunn*	Republican	
14	Becky Nutt*	Republican	Resigned November 1, 2021
14	Lupe Diaz	Republican	Appointed November 19, 2021
14	Gail Griffin*	Republican	
15	Justin Wilmeth	Republican	
15	Steve Kaiser	Republican	
16	John Fillmore*	Republican	
16	Jacqueline Parker	Republican	
17	Jeff Weninger*	Republican	
17	Jennifer Pawlik*	Democrat	
18	Jennifer Jermaine*	Democrat	
18	Denise Epstein*	Democrat	
19	Lorenzo Sierra*	Democrat	
19	Diego Espinoza*	Democrat	
20	Shawnna Bolick*	Republican	
20	Judy Schwiebert	Democrat	
21	Kevin Payne*	Republican	
21	Beverly Pingerelli	Republican	
22	Frank Carroll*	Republican	
22	Ben Toma*	Republican	
23	Joseph Chaplik	Republican	
23	John Kavanagh	Republican	
24	Jennifer Longdon*	Democrat	
24	Amish Shah*	Democrat	
25	Michelle Udall*	Republican	
25	Russell Bowers*	Republican	
26	Melody Hernandez	Democrat	
26	Athena Salman*	Democrat	
27	Reginald Bolding*	Democrat	
27	Diego Rodriguez*	Democrat	Resigned November 17, 2021
27	Marcelino Quiñonez	Democrat	Appointed December 15, 2021
28	Kelli Butler*	Democrat	
28	Aaron Lieberman*	Democrat	Resigned September 20, 2021
28	Sarah Liguori	Democrat	Appointed October 18, 2021
29	Richard C. Andrade*	Democrat	
29	Cesar Chavez*	Democrat	
30	Robert Meza*	Democrat	
30	Raquel Terán*	Democrat	Appointed to Arizona Senate September 15, 2021
30	Christian Solorio	Democrat	Appointed October 27, 2021
