= 2018 Arizona Senate election =

- November 6, 2018

All 30 seats of the Arizona Senate 16 seats needed for a majority
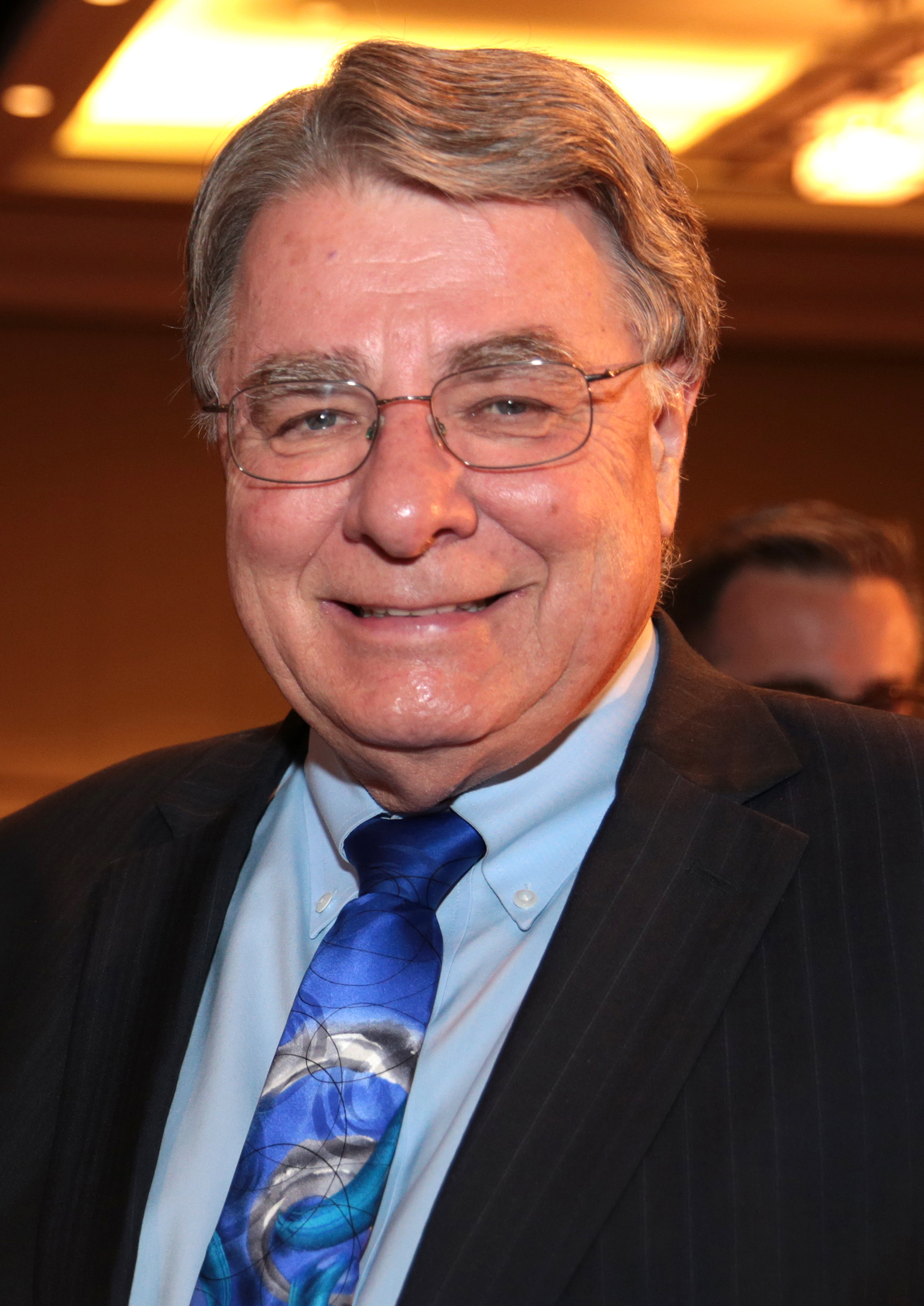

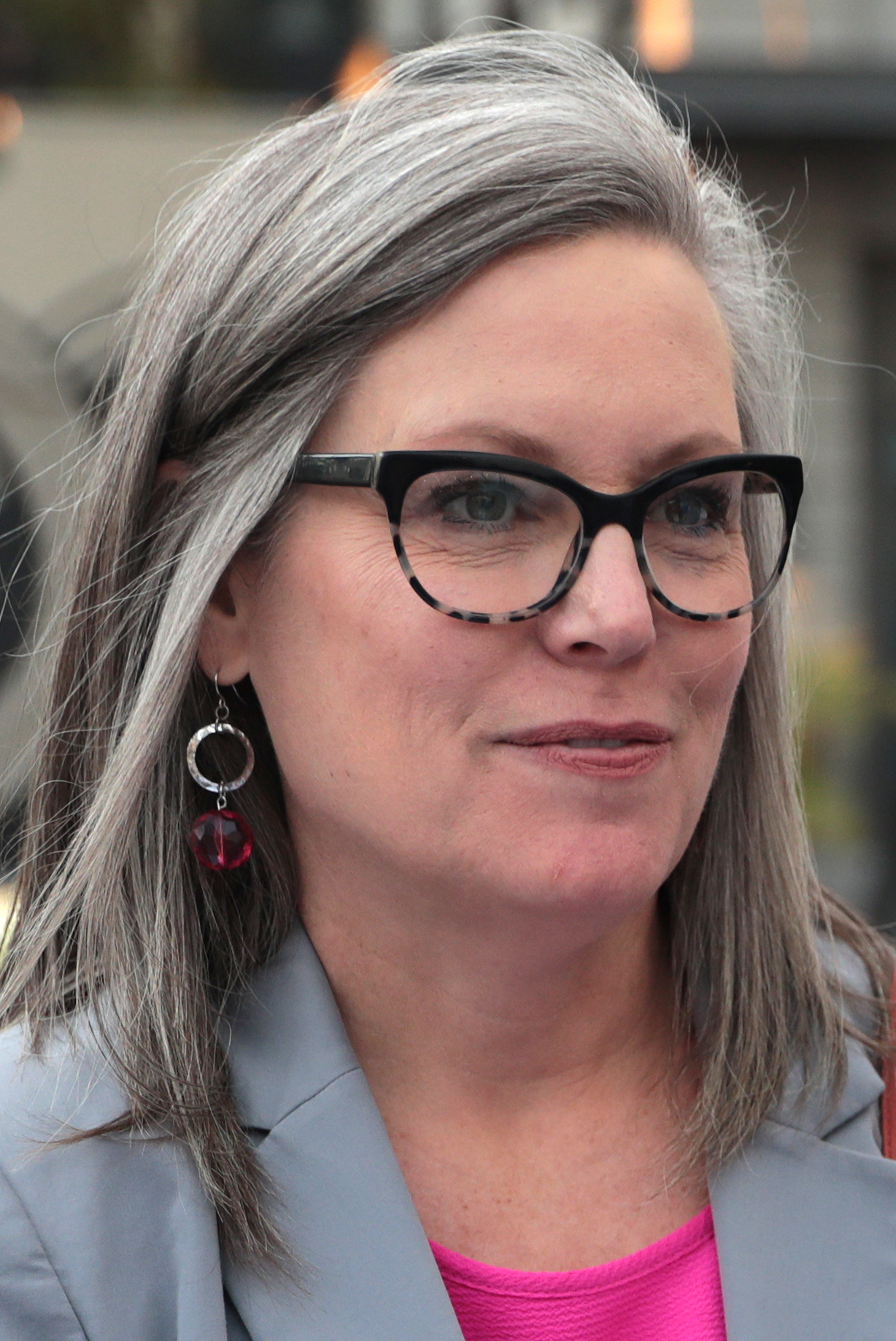
	Majority party	Minority party
Leader	Steve Yarbrough	Katie Hobbs
Party	Republican	Democratic
Leader's seat	17th-Chandler (retired)	24th-Phoenix (retired)
Last election	17	13
Seats after	17	13
Seat change	Steady	Steady
Senate President before election
Steve Yarbrough
Republican
Elected Senate President
Karen Fann
Republican

The 2018 Arizona Senate election took place on November 6, 2018, with the primary election held on August 28, 2018. Arizona voters elected all 30 members of the Arizona Senate to serve two-year terms.

The election coincided with United States national elections and Arizona state elections, including U.S. Senate, U.S. House, Arizona governor and Arizona House.

Following the previous election in 2016, Republicans held a 17-to-13-seat majority over Democrats. Republicans maintained their unchanged 17-to-13 majority in 2018. The newly elected members served in the 54th Arizona State Legislature, during which Republican Karen Fann was elected President of the Arizona Senate. (Note: Karen Fann was elected unanimously as President of the Senate for the 54th legislature.)

== Retiring incumbents ==
=== Democrats ===
1. District 3: Olivia Cajero Bedford (Note: Senator Olivia Cajero Bedford ran for Arizona House, but was defeated in the Democratic primary election.) (term-limited)
2. District 9: Steve Farley (Note: Senator Steve Farley ran for Arizona Governor, but was defeated in the Democratic primary election.)
3. District 24: Katie Hobbs (Note: Senator Katie Hobbs was elected Arizona Secretary of State.)
4. District 27: Catherine Miranda (Note: Senator Catherine Miranda ran for US House, but was defeated in the Democratic primary election.)
5. District 30: Robert Meza (Note: Senator Robert Meza was elected to the Arizona House.) (term-limited)

=== Republicans ===
1. District 11: Steve Smith (Note: Senator Steve Smith ran for US House, but was defeated in the Republican primary election.)
2. District 12: Warren Petersen (Note: Senator Warren Petersen was elected to the Arizona House.)
3. District 14: Gail Griffin (Note: Senator Gail Griffin was elected to the Arizona House.) (term-limited)
4. District 15: Nancy Barto (Note: Senator Nancy Barto was elected to the Arizona House.) (term-limited)
5. District 17: Steve Yarbrough (term-limited)
6. District 20: Kimberly Yee (Note: Senator Kimberly Yee was elected Arizona Treasurer.)
7. District 22: Judy Burges (term-limited)
8. District 23: John Kavanagh (Note: Senator John Kavanagh was elected to the Arizona House.)
9. District 25: Bob Worsley

== Predictions ==
Source	Ranking	As of
Governing	Lean R	October 8, 2018

== Summary of results ==
Italics denote an open seat held by the incumbent party; bold text denotes a gain for a party.

State senate district	Incumbent	Party	Elected senator	Outcome
1st	Karen Fann	Rep	Karen Fann	Rep hold
2nd	Andrea Dalessandro	Dem	Andrea Dalessandro	Dem hold
3rd	Olivia Cajero Bedford	Dem	Sally Ann Gonzales	Dem hold
4th	Lisa Otondo	Dem	Lisa Otondo	Dem hold
5th	Sonny Borrelli	Rep	Sonny Borrelli	Rep hold
6th	Sylvia Tenney Allen	Rep	Sylvia Tenney Allen (Note: Republican Senator Sylvia Allen resigned on December 31, 2020.)	Rep hold
7th	Jamescita Peshlakai	Dem	Jamescita Peshlakai	Dem hold
8th	Frank Pratt	Rep	Frank Pratt	Rep hold
9th	Steve Farley	Dem	Victoria Steele	Dem hold
10th	David Bradley	Dem	David Bradley	Dem hold
11th	Steve Smith	Rep	Vince Leach	Rep hold
12th	Warren Petersen	Rep	Eddie Farnsworth	Rep hold
13th	Sine Kerr (Note: Republican Sine Kerr was sworn in January 8, 2018 to replace Republican Senator Steve Montenegro who resigned on December 15, 2017.)	Rep	Sine Kerr	Rep hold
14th	Gail Griffin	Rep	David Gowan	Rep hold
15th	Nancy Barto	Rep	Heather Carter	Rep hold
16th	David Christian Farnsworth	Rep	David Christian Farnsworth	Rep hold
17th	Steve Yarbrough	Rep	J. D. Mesnard	Rep hold
18th	Sean Bowie	Dem	Sean Bowie	Dem hold
19th	Lupe Chavira Contreras	Dem	Lupe Chavira Contreras	Dem hold
20th	Kimberly Yee	Rep	Paul Boyer	Rep hold
21st	Rick Gray (Note: Republican Rick Gray was sworn in January 19, 2018 to replace Republican Senator Debbie Lesko who resigned on January 8, 2018.)	Rep	Rick Gray	Rep hold
22nd	Judy Burges	Rep	David Livingston	Rep hold
23rd	John Kavanagh	Rep	Michelle Ugenti-Rita	Rep hold
24th	Katie Hobbs	Dem	Lela Alston	Dem hold
25th	Bob Worsley	Rep	Tyler Pace	Rep hold
26th	Juan Mendez	Dem	Juan Mendez	Dem hold
27th	Catherine Miranda	Dem	Rebecca Rios	Dem hold
28th	Kate Brophy McGee	Rep	Kate Brophy McGee	Rep hold
29th	Martín Quezada	Dem	Martín Quezada	Dem hold
30th	Robert Meza	Dem	Otoniel "Tony" Navarrete	Dem hold

== Detailed results ==
=== District 1 ===
Democratic primary results
Party	Candidate	Votes	%
Democratic	Jo Craycraft	15,002	100.00%
Total votes		15,002	100.00%

Republican primary results
Party	Candidate	Votes	%
Republican	Karen Fann (incumbent)	38,797	100.00%
Total votes		38,797	100.00%

General election results
Party	Candidate	Votes	%
Republican	Karen Fann (incumbent)	76,856	69.61%
Democratic	Jo Craycraft	33,554	30.39%
Total votes		110,410	100.00%
Republican hold			

=== District 2 ===
Democratic primary results
Party	Candidate	Votes	%
Democratic	Andrea Dalessandro (incumbent)	16,332	100.00%
Total votes		16,332	100.00%

Republican primary results
Party	Candidate	Votes	%
Republican	Shelley Kais	6,800	52.45%
Republican	Bobby Wilson	6,164	47.55%
Total votes		12,964	100.00%

General election results
Party	Candidate	Votes	%
Democratic	Andrea Dalessandro (incumbent)	36,893	59.68%
Republican	Shelley Kais	24,925	40.32%
Total votes		61,818	100.00%
Democratic hold			

=== District 3 ===
Democratic primary results
Party	Candidate	Votes	%
Democratic	Sally Ann Gonzales	10,632	55.44%
Democratic	Betty Villegas	8,547	44.56%
Total votes		19,179	100.00%

General election results
Party	Candidate	Votes	%
Democratic	Sally Ann Gonzales	45,529	100.00%
Total votes		45,529	100.00%
Democratic hold			

=== District 4 ===
Democratic primary results
Party	Candidate	Votes	%
Democratic	Lisa Otondo (incumbent)	10,638	100.00%
Total votes		10,638	100.00%

General election results
Party	Candidate	Votes	%
Democratic	Lisa Otondo (incumbent)	33,034	99.46%
Republican	Julian Contreraz (Note: Was a write-in candidate in this election.)	180	0.54%
Total votes		33,214	100.00%
Democratic hold			

=== District 5 ===
Democratic primary results
Party	Candidate	Votes	%
Democratic	J'aime Morgaine	8,065	100.00%
Total votes		8,065	100.00%

Republican primary results
Party	Candidate	Votes	%
Republican	Sonny Borrelli (incumbent)	27,918	100.00%
Total votes		27,918	100.00%

General election results
Party	Candidate	Votes	%
Republican	Sonny Borrelli (incumbent)	56,454	75.29%
Democratic	J'aime Morgaine	18,530	24.71%
Total votes		74,984	100.00%
Republican hold			

=== District 6 ===
Democratic primary results
Party	Candidate	Votes	%
Democratic	Wade Carlisle	17,812	100.00%
Total votes		17,812	100.00%

Republican primary results
Party	Candidate	Votes	%
Republican	Sylvia Tenney Allen (incumbent)	23,044	100.00%
Total votes		23,044	100.00%

Libertarian primary results
Party	Candidate	Votes	%
Libertarian	Jeff "JD" Daniels	83	100.00%
Total votes		83	100.00%

General election results
Party	Candidate	Votes	%
Republican	Sylvia Tenney Allen (incumbent)	48,044	50.91%
Democratic	Wade Carlisle	46,332	49.09%
Total votes		94,376	100.00%
Republican hold			

=== District 7 ===
Democratic primary results
Party	Candidate	Votes	%
Democratic	Jamescita Peshlakai (incumbent)	23,503	100.00%
Total votes		23,503	100.00%

Republican primary results
Party	Candidate	Votes	%
Republican	JL Mealer	9,483	100.00%
Total votes		9,483	100.00%

General election results
Party	Candidate	Votes	%
Democratic	Jamescita Peshlakai (incumbent)	43,179	67.18%
Republican	JL Mealer	21,091	32.82%
Total votes		64,270	100.00%
Democratic hold			

=== District 8 ===
Democratic primary results
Party	Candidate	Votes	%
Democratic	Sharon Girard	6,244	53.69%
Democratic	Natali Fierros Bock	5,385	46.31%
Total votes		11,629	100.00%

Republican primary results
Party	Candidate	Votes	%
Republican	Frank Pratt (incumbent)	13,496	100.00%
Total votes		13,496	100.00%

General election results
Party	Candidate	Votes	%
Republican	Frank Pratt (incumbent)	31,181	56.14%
Democratic	Sharon Girard	24,360	43.86%
Total votes		55,541	100.00%
Republican hold			

=== District 9 ===
Democratic primary results
Party	Candidate	Votes	%
Democratic	Victoria Steele	23,895	82.20%
Democratic	Jim Love	5,174	17.80%
Total votes		29,069	100.00%

Republican primary results
Party	Candidate	Votes	%
Republican	Randy Fleenor	698	100.00%
Total votes		698	100.00%

General election results
Party	Candidate	Votes	%
Democratic	Victoria Steele	58,571	62.76%
Republican	Randy Fleenor	34,758	37.24%
Total votes		93,329	100.00%
Democratic hold			

=== District 10 ===
Democratic primary results
Party	Candidate	Votes	%
Democratic	David Bradley (incumbent)	24,583	100.00%
Total votes		24,583	100.00%

Republican primary results
Party	Candidate	Votes	%
Republican	Marilyn Wiles	18,057	100.00%
Total votes		18,057	100.00%

General election results
Party	Candidate	Votes	%
Democratic	David Bradley (incumbent)	52,376	58.48%
Republican	Marilyn Wiles	37,187	41.52%
Total votes		89,563	100.00%
Democratic hold			

=== District 11 ===
Democratic primary results
Party	Candidate	Votes	%
Democratic	Ralph Atchue	18,493	100.00%
Total votes		18,493	100.00%

Republican primary results
Party	Candidate	Votes	%
Republican	Venden "Vince" Leach	26,252	100.00%
Total votes		26,252	100.00%

Green primary results
Party	Candidate	Votes	%
Green	Mohammad Arif	7	100.00%
Total votes		7	100.00%

General election results
Party	Candidate	Votes	%
Republican	Venden "Vince" Leach	53,232	54.55%
Democratic	Ralph Atchue	43,273	44.35%
Green	Mohammad Arif	1,076	1.10%
Total votes		97,581	100.00%
Republican hold			

=== District 12 ===
Democratic primary results
Party	Candidate	Votes	%
Democratic	Elizabeth Brown	13,551	100.00%
Total votes		13,551	100.00%

Republican primary results
Party	Candidate	Votes	%
Republican	Eddie Farnsworth	15,642	51.21%
Republican	Jimmy Lindblom	14,904	48.79%
Total votes		30,546	100.00%

General election results
Party	Candidate	Votes	%
Republican	Eddie Farnsworth	60,959	57.83%
Democratic	Elizabeth Brown	44,449	42.17%
Total votes		105,408	100.00%
Republican hold			

=== District 13 ===
Democratic primary results
Party	Candidate	Votes	%
Democratic	Michelle Harris	11,267	100.00%
Total votes		11,267	100.00%

Republican primary results
Party	Candidate	Votes	%
Republican	Sine Kerr (incumbent)	12,824	50.13%
Republican	Brent Backus	7,634	29.84%
Republican	Don Shooter	5,121	20.02%
Total votes		25,579	100.00%

General election results
Party	Candidate	Votes	%
Republican	Sine Kerr (incumbent)	50,432	62.53%
Democratic	Michelle Harris	30,215	37.47%
Total votes		80,647	100.00%
Republican hold			

=== District 14 ===
Democratic primary results
Party	Candidate	Votes	%
Democratic	Jaime Alvarez	10,491	68.66%
Democratic	Mendy Gomez	4,789	31.34%
Total votes		15,280	100.00%

Republican primary results
Party	Candidate	Votes	%
Republican	David Gowan	11,034	40.41%
Republican	Drew John	9,388	34.38%
Republican	Lori Kilpatrick	6,885	25.21%
Total votes		27,307	100.00%

General election results
Party	Candidate	Votes	%
Republican	David Gowan	48,131	60.54%
Democratic	Jaime Alvarez	31,368	39.46%
Total votes		79,499	100.00%
Republican hold			

=== District 15 ===
Democratic primary results
Party	Candidate	Votes	%
Democratic	Kristin Dybvig-Pawelko	14,679	100.00%
Total votes		14,679	100.00%

Republican primary results
Party	Candidate	Votes	%
Republican	Heather Carter	24,273	100.00%
Total votes		24,273	100.00%

General election results
Party	Candidate	Votes	%
Republican	Heather Carter	57,264	60.13%
Democratic	Kristin Dybvig-Pawelko	37,971	39.87%
Total votes		95,235	100.00%
Republican hold			

=== District 16 ===
Democratic primary results
Party	Candidate	Votes	%
Democratic	Benjamin "Ben" Carmitchel	11,785	100.00%
Total votes		11,785	100.00%

Republican primary results
Party	Candidate	Votes	%
Republican	David Christian Farnsworth (incumbent)	19,399	75.83%
Republican	Michael "Big Mike" Hernandez	6,184	24.17%
Total votes		25,583	100.00%

General election results
Party	Candidate	Votes	%
Republican	David Christian Farnsworth (incumbent)	51,406	61.44%
Democratic	Benjamin "Ben" Carmitchel	32,261	38.56%
Total votes		83,667	100.00%
Republican hold			

=== District 17 ===
Democratic primary results
Party	Candidate	Votes	%
Democratic	Steve Weichert	15,680	100.00%
Total votes		15,680	100.00%

Republican primary results
Party	Candidate	Votes	%
Republican	J. D. Mesnard	22,206	100.00%
Total votes		22,206	100.00%

General election results
Party	Candidate	Votes	%
Republican	J. D. Mesnard	48,008	50.92%
Democratic	Steve Weichert	46,264	49.08%
Total votes		94,272	100.00%
Republican hold			

=== District 18 ===
Democratic primary results
Party	Candidate	Votes	%
Democratic	Sean Bowie (incumbent)	21,256	100.00%
Total votes		21,256	100.00%

Republican primary results
Party	Candidate	Votes	%
Republican	Frank Schmuck	20,824	100.00%
Total votes		20,824	100.00%

General election results
Party	Candidate	Votes	%
Democratic	Sean Bowie (incumbent)	57,401	56.85%
Republican	Frank Schmuck	43,575	43.15%
Total votes		100,976	100.00%
Democratic hold			

=== District 19 ===
Democratic primary results
Party	Candidate	Votes	%
Democratic	Lupe Chavira Contreras (incumbent)	9,194	100.00%
Total votes		9,194	100.00%

General election results
Party	Candidate	Votes	%
Democratic	Lupe Chavira Contreras (incumbent)	32,872	100.00%
Total votes		32,872	100.00%
Democratic hold			

=== District 20 ===
Democratic primary results
Party	Candidate	Votes	%
Democratic	Douglas Ervin	7,377	51.63%
Democratic	Matthew Marquez	6,911	48.37%
Total votes		14,288	100.00%

Republican primary results
Party	Candidate	Votes	%
Republican	Paul Boyer	13,275	71.19%
Republican	Charles Loftus	5,372	28.81%
Total votes		18,647	100.00%

General election results
Party	Candidate	Votes	%
Republican	Paul Boyer	35,170	48.34%
Democratic	Douglas Ervin	32,352	44.47%
Independent	Doug "Q" Quelland	5,229	7.19%
Total votes		72,751	100.00%
Republican hold			

=== District 21 ===
Republican primary results
Party	Candidate	Votes	%
Republican	Rick Gray (incumbent)	14,497	61.55%
Republican	Randy Miller	9,055	38.45%
Total votes		23,552	100.00%

General election results
Party	Candidate	Votes	%
Republican	Rick Gray (incumbent)	40,869	52.23%
Independent	Kathy Knecht	37,380	47.77%
Total votes		78,249	100.00%
Republican hold			

=== District 22 ===
Democratic primary results
Party	Candidate	Votes	%
Democratic	Wendy Garcia	10,531	58.13%
Democratic	Brianna Westbrook	7,586	41.87%
Total votes		18,117	100.00%

Republican primary results
Party	Candidate	Votes	%
Republican	David Livingston	25,842	70.32%
Republican	Clair Van Steenwyk	10,908	29.68%
Total votes		36,750	100.00%

General election results
Party	Candidate	Votes	%
Republican	David Livingston	70,775	63.34%
Democratic	Wendy Garcia	40,957	36.66%
Total votes		111,732	100.00%
Republican hold			

=== District 23 ===
Democratic primary results
Party	Candidate	Votes	%
Democratic	Daria Lohman	18,681	100.00%
Total votes		18,681	100.00%

Republican primary results
Party	Candidate	Votes	%
Republican	Michelle Ugenti-Rita	15,347	41.38%
Republican	Timothy Jeffries	12,951	34.92%
Republican	Kristina Kelly	8,792	23.70%
Total votes		37,090	100.00%

General election results
Party	Candidate	Votes	%
Republican	Michelle Ugenti-Rita	67,852	57.11%
Democratic	Daria Lohman	45,344	38.17%
Independent	Christopher "Chris" Leone	5,603	4.72%
Total votes		118,799	100.00%
Republican hold			

=== District 24 ===
Democratic primary results
Party	Candidate	Votes	%
Democratic	Lela Alston	19,925	100.00%
Total votes		19,925	100.00%

Republican primary results
Party	Candidate	Votes	%
Republican	Vicki Alger	7,596	100.00%
Total votes		7,596	100.00%

General election results
Party	Candidate	Votes	%
Democratic	Lela Alston	48,245	71.99%
Republican	Vicki Alger	18,772	28.01%
Total votes		67,017	100.00%
Democratic hold			

=== District 25 ===
Democratic primary results
Party	Candidate	Votes	%
Democratic	Kathy Mohr-Almeida	12,465	100.00%
Total votes		12,465	100.00%

Republican primary results
Party	Candidate	Votes	%
Republican	Tyler Pace	25,569	98.18%
Republican	Itasca Small	473	1.82%
Total votes		26,042	100.00%

General election results
Party	Candidate	Votes	%
Republican	Tyler Pace	52,208	61.80%
Democratic	Kathy Mohr-Almeida	32,268	38.20%
Total votes		84,476	100.00%
Republican hold			

=== District 26 ===
Democratic primary results
Party	Candidate	Votes	%
Democratic	Juan Mendez (incumbent)	6,660	53.22%
Democratic	Debbie Nez Manuel	5,853	46.78%
Total votes		12,513	100.00%

Republican primary results
Party	Candidate	Votes	%
Republican	Rebecca Speakman	6,923	100.00%
Total votes		6,923	100.00%

General election results
Party	Candidate	Votes	%
Democratic	Juan Mendez (incumbent)	32,812	65.76%
Republican	Rebecca Speakman	17,086	34.24%
Total votes		49,898	100.00%
Democratic hold			

=== District 27 ===
Democratic primary results
Party	Candidate	Votes	%
Democratic	Rebecca Rios	11,170	78.63%
Democratic	Cipriano Miranda	3,036	21.37%
Total votes		14,206	100.00%

General election results
Party	Candidate	Votes	%
Democratic	Rebecca Rios	40,012	100.00%
Total votes		40,012	100.00%
Democratic hold			

=== District 28 ===
Democratic primary results
Party	Candidate	Votes	%
Democratic	Christine Porter Marsh	19,671	100.00%
Total votes		19,671	100.00%

Republican primary results
Party	Candidate	Votes	%
Republican	Kate Brophy McGee (incumbent)	17,325	70.12%
Republican	Kenneth R. "Ken" Bowers Jr.	7,383	29.88%
Total votes		24,708	100.00%

General election results
Party	Candidate	Votes	%
Republican	Kate Brophy McGee (incumbent)	47,278	50.14%
Democratic	Christine Porter Marsh	47,011	49.86%
Total votes		94,289	100.00%
Republican hold			

=== District 29 ===
Democratic primary results
Party	Candidate	Votes	%
Democratic	Martín J. Quezada (incumbent)	8,457	100.00%
Total votes		8,457	100.00%

General election results
Party	Candidate	Votes	%
Democratic	Martín J. Quezada (incumbent)	29,003	99.57%
Republican	Charles Carpenter	124	0.43%
Total votes		29,127	100.00%
Democratic hold			

=== District 30 ===
Democratic primary results
Party	Candidate	Votes	%
Democratic	Otoniel "Tony" Navarrete	10,025	100.00%
Total votes		10,025	100.00%

General election results
Party	Candidate	Votes	%
Democratic	Otoniel "Tony" Navarrete	28,574	100.00%
Total votes		28,574	100.00%
Democratic hold			

== See also ==
- 2018 United States elections
- 2018 United States Senate election in Arizona
- 2018 United States House of Representatives elections in Arizona
- 2018 Arizona elections
- 2018 Arizona gubernatorial election
- 2018 Arizona Secretary of State election
- 2018 Arizona Attorney General election
- 2018 Arizona Superintendent of Public Instruction election
- 2018 Arizona House of Representatives election
- 54th Arizona State Legislature
- Arizona Senate
