= Arizona's 1st legislative district =

American legislative district

- Map of District 1: Approved January 21, 2022
- Senator: Mark Finchem (R)
- House members: Quang Nguyen (R); Selina Bliss (R)
- Registration: 51.52% Republican; 18.39% Democratic; 28.60% Other
- Demographics: 78% White; 1% Black/African American; 3% Native American; 2% Asian; 15% Hispanic
- Population (2020): 237,896
- Registered voters: 175,638

Arizona's 1st legislative district is one of 30 legislative districts in the U.S. state of Arizona. It encompasses the majority of Yavapai County and a portion of southern Coconino County, including the communities of Prescott, Prescott Valley, Chino Valley, and Sedona.

The district is represented in the 57th Arizona State Legislature by Mark Finchem in the Arizona Senate and by Selina Bliss and Quang Nguyen in the Arizona House of Representatives, all Republicans.

According to the Arizona Independent Redistricting Commission (AIRC), District 1 leans heavily Republican and is considered non-competitive. Following the 2020 United States census, the district had a total population of 237,896.

== Political representation ==
=== Arizona Senate ===
Name	Party	Term	Legislature	Notes
District created January 22, 1970
Boyd Tenney	Republican	1965–1982	30th 31st 32nd 33rd 34th 35th	(Note: Tenney previously served in the 27th Legislature as one of 2 state senators representing Yavapai County and in the 28th and 29th Legislatures as the state senator representing Mohave and Yavapai Counties.)
John U. Hays	Republican	1983–1990	36th 37th 38th 39th	
Carol Springer	Republican	1991–1998	40th 41st 42nd 43rd	
Ken Bennett	Republican	1999–2006; 2023–2024	44th 45th 46th 47th 56th	
Tom O'Halleran	Republican	2007–2008	48th	
Steve Pierce	Republican	2009–2016	49th 50th 51st 52nd	
Karen Fann	Republican	2017–2022	53rd 54th 55th	
Mark Finchem	Republican	since 2025	57th	

=== Arizona House of Representatives ===
Name	Party	Term	Legislature	Notes
District created January 22, 1970
Gladys Gardner	Republican	1965–1974	30th 31st	(Note: Gardner previously served in the 27th Legislature as one of 3 state representatives representing Yavapai County and in the 28th and 29th Legislatures as one of 2 state representatives representing Mohave and Yavapai Counties.)
Ray Everett	Republican	1969–1974	30th 31st	(Note: Everett previously served in the 29th Legislature as one of 2 state representatives representing Mohave and Yavapai Counties.)
John U. Hays	Republican	1975–1982	32nd 33rd 34th 35th	
James Thomas	Democratic	1975–1976	32nd	
James A. Woodward	Republican	1977–1978	33rd	
Jerry Everall	Republican	1979–1984	34th 35th 36th	
Donald R. Aldridge	Republican	1983–1998	36th 37th 38th 39th 40th 41st 42nd 43rd	
R.D. Carson	Republican	1985–1992	37th 38th 39th 40th	
Sue Lynch	Republican	1993–1998	41st 42nd 43rd	
Linda Binder	Republican	1999–2002	44th 45th	
Barbara Blewster	Republican	1999–2000	44th	
Henry Camarot	Democratic	2001–2002	45th	
Lucy Mason	Republican	2003–2010	46th 47th 48th 49th	
Tom O'Halleran	Republican	2003–2006	46th 47th	
Andy Tobin	Republican	2007–2014	48th 49th 50th 51st	
Karen Fann	Republican	2011–2016	50th 51st 52nd	
Noel W. Campbell	Republican	2015–2020	52nd 53rd 54th	
David Stringer	Republican	2017–2019	53rd 54th	(Note: Resigned March 27, 2019.)
Steve Pierce	Republican	2019–2020	54th	(Note: Appointed to fill Stringer's seat on April 3, 2019.)
Quang Ngyuen	Republican	since 2021	55th 56th 57th	
Judy Burges	Republican	2021–2022	55th	
Selina Bliss	Republican	since 2023	56th 57th	

== Election results (since 2022) ==
Following the 2020 United States redistricting cycle, the AIRC redrew legislative district boundaries in Arizona. The 2022 elections were the first held in the newly redrawn District 1.

=== Arizona Senate ===
2026 Arizona Senate election, 1st district
Party	Candidate	Votes	%
Republican	Mark Finchem (incumbent)		
Democratic	Christine Dargon		
Republican hold			

2024 Arizona Senate election, 1st district
Party	Candidate	Votes	%
Republican	Mark Finchem	94,947	65.91
Democratic	Mike S. Fogel	49,108	34.09
Total votes		144,055	100.00
Republican hold			

2022 Arizona Senate election, 1st district
Party	Candidate	Votes	%
Republican	Ken Bennett	82,234	67.25
Democratic	Mike Fogel	40,056	32.75
Total votes		122,290	100.00
Republican hold			

=== Arizona House of Representatives ===
2026 Arizona House of Representatives election, 1st district
Party	Candidate	Votes	%
Republican	Selina Bliss (incumbent)		
Republican	Quang Nguyen (incumbent)		
Democratic	Sandy Zalecki		
Libertarian	Charles Eakins (write-in)		
Total votes			
Republican hold			
Republican hold			

2024 Arizona House of Representatives election, 1st district
Party	Candidate	Votes	%
Republican	Selina Bliss (incumbent)	88,691	33.92
Republican	Quang Nguyen (incumbent)	87,726	33.54
Democratic	Marcia Smith	44,199	16.90
Democratic	Jay Ruby	40,911	15.64
Total votes		261,527	100.00
Republican hold			
Republican hold			

2022 Arizona House of Representatives election, 1st district
Party	Candidate	Votes	%
Republican	Quang Nguyen (incumbent)	75,106	33.18
Republican	Selina Bliss	74,731	33.01
Democratic	Cathy Ransom	39,665	17.52
Democratic	Neil Sinclair	36,867	16.29
Total votes		226,369	100.00
Republican hold			
Republican hold			

== Election results (2012–2021) ==
Following the 2010 United States redistricting cycle, the AIRC redrew legislative district boundaries in Arizona. District 1 encompassed the majority of Yavapai County and a portion of northern Maricopa County, including the communities of Prescott, Prescott Valley, Chino Valley, and Anthem. The 2012 elections were the first held in the newly redrawn District 1.

=== Arizona Senate ===
2020 Arizona Senate election, 1st district
Party	Candidate	Votes	%
Republican	Karen Fann (incumbent)	105,712	72.52
Democratic	Gilbert Carillo	40,063	27.48
Total votes		145,775	100.00
Republican hold			

2018 Arizona Senate election, 1st district
Party	Candidate	Votes	%
Republican	Karen Fann (incumbent)	76,856	69.61
Democratic	Jo Craycraft	33,554	30.39
Total votes		110,410	100.00
Republican hold			

2016 Arizona Senate election, 1st district
Party	Candidate	Votes	%
Republican	Karen Fann	87,011	100.00
Total votes		87,011	100.00
Republican hold			

2014 Arizona Senate election, 1st district
Party	Candidate	Votes	%
Republican	Steve Pierce (incumbent)	55,273	99.75
Independent	Teri Frost (write-in)	139	0.25
Total votes		55,412	100.00
Republican hold			

2012 Arizona Senate election, 1st district
Party	Candidate	Votes	%
Republican	Steve Pierce (incumbent)	65,988	71.23
Independent	Tom Rawles	26,656	28.77
Total votes		92,644	100.00
Republican hold			

=== Arizona House of Representatives ===
2020 Arizona House of Representatives election, 1st district
Party	Candidate	Votes	%
Republican	Judy Burges	92,058	40.79
Republican	Quang Nguyen	86,405	38.29
Democratic	Judy Stahl	47,204	20.92
Total votes		225,667	100.00
Republican hold			
Republican hold			

2018 Arizona House of Representatives election, 1st district
Party	Candidate	Votes	%
Republican	Noel W. Campbell (incumbent)	70,130	35.08
Republican	David Stringer (incumbent)	67,023	33.53
Democratic	Jan Manolis	32,706	16.36
Democratic	Ed Gogek	30,055	15.03
Total votes		199,914	100.00
Republican hold			
Republican hold			

2016 Arizona House of Representatives election, 1st district
Party	Candidate	Votes	%
Republican	Noel W. Campbell (incumbent)	70,412	38.70
Republican	David Stringer	65,993	36.27
Democratic	Peter Pierson	33,396	18.35
Green	Haryaksha Gregor Knauer	12,145	6.68
Total votes		181,946	100.00
Republican hold			
Republican hold			

2014 Arizona House of Representatives election, 1st district
Party	Candidate	Votes	%
Republican	Karen Fann (incumbent)	46,597	41.35
Republican	Noel W. Campbell	43,864	38.93
Democratic	Frank Cuccia	22,223	19.72
Total votes		112,684	100.00
Republican hold			
Republican hold			

2012 Arizona House of Representatives election, 1st district
Party	Candidate	Votes	%
Republican	Andy Tobin (incumbent)	62,379	50.64
Republican	Karen Fann (incumbent)	60,800	49.36
Total votes		123,179	100.00
Republican hold			
Republican hold			

== See also ==
- List of Arizona legislative districts
- Arizona State Legislature
