= Todd Clodfelter =

American politician

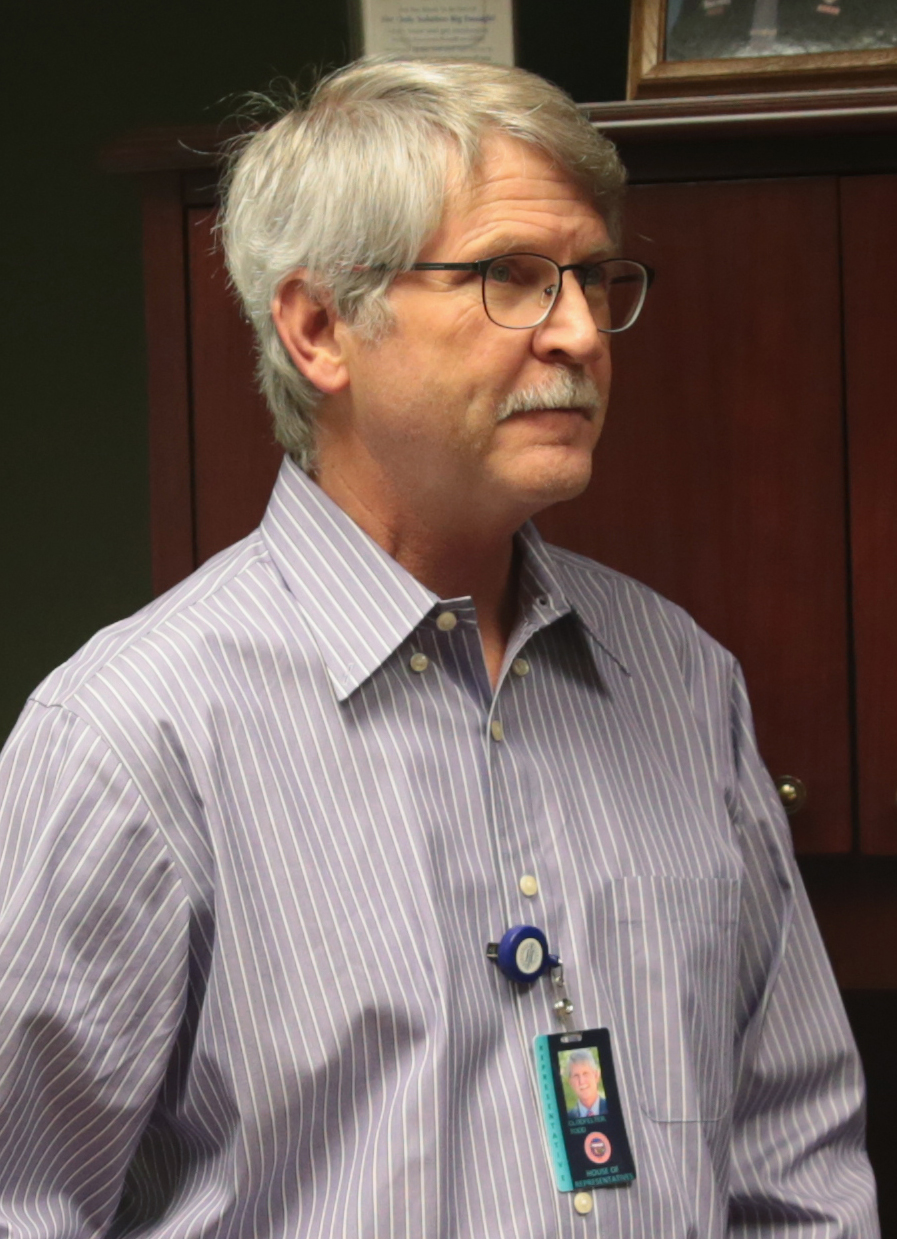

Member of the Arizona House of Representatives from the 10th district
- In office January 9, 2017 – January 14, 2019
- Preceded by: Stefanie Mach; Bruce Wheeler
- Succeeded by: Domingo DeGrazia

Personal details
- Born: April 17, 1957 (age 69)
- Party: Republican
- Religion: Baptist

Todd Andrew Clodfelter (born 17 April 1957) is an American politician and Republican former member of the Arizona House of Representatives elected to represent District 10 in 2016 until he was defeated for reelection in 2018. He is also the owner of Ace Graphics.

== Education ==
Clodfelter received a bachelor's degree in speech communications from the University of Arizona.

== Elections ==
- 2016 – Clodfelter and Democrat Kirsten Engel narrowly defeated incumbent Democrat Stefanie Mach in the general election. Clodfelter took the most votes of all three candidates, edging out Engel by 97 votes and Mach by 857 votes.
- 2014 – Clodfelter and William Wildish were unopposed in the Republican primary. They were defeated in the general election by Democratic incumbents Bruce Wheeler and Stefanie Mach with Clodfelter receiving 25.1% of the vote.
- 2012 – Clodfelter and incumbent Ted Vogt were unopposed in the Republican primary. They were defeated in the general election by Democratic incumbent Bruce Wheeler and Stefanie Mach with Clodfelter receiving 22.6% of the vote.
- 1995 – Clodfelter first ran for the legislature in 1995 losing in the Republican primary.
