= Bruce Wheeler =

American politician (born 1948)

Member of the Arizona House of Representatives from the 10th district
- In office January 14, 2013 – January 9, 2017
- Succeeded by: Todd Clodfelter; Kirsten Engel

Member of the Arizona House of Representatives from the 28th district
- In office January 10, 2011 – January 14, 2013
- Preceded by: David Bradley

Member of the Arizona House of Representatives from the 13th district
- In office January 1975 – January 1977
- Succeeded by: Larry Hawke

Personal details
- Born: January 14, 1948 (age 78)
- Party: Democratic
- Education: University of Arizona; University of Phoenix

Bruce Wheeler (born October 14, 1948) is an American politician and a member of the Democratic Party who formerly served in the Arizona House of Representatives until 2017. Wheeler previously served in the State House from January 1975 until January 1977. He also served on the Tucson City Council from 1987 to 1995.

In June 2017, Wheeler announced his candidacy for the U.S. House to represent Arizona's 2nd congressional district in the 2018 U.S. federal midterm election.

== Education ==
Wheeler earned his BA in international relations from the University of Arizona and his MBA from the University of Phoenix.

== Elections ==
- 1974: Wheeler was one of the top two candidates in the District 13 1974 Democratic Primary and took the second seat in the November 5, 1974 General election with 11,180 votes against Republican nominees Stephen Beal and Seth Linthicum.
- 1976: Dunn and Wheeler won the 1976 Democratic Primary; Dunn was re-elected, but Wheeler lost the second seat in the November 2, 1976 General election by 11 votes to Republican nominee Larry Hawke.
- 1978: He was also defeated in the 13th district general election.
- 2010: With incumbent Democratic Representative David Bradley running for a seat on the Arizona Corporation Commission and leaving a District 28 seat open, Wheeler ran alongside incumbent Steve Farley in the five-way August 24, 2010 Democratic Primary, placing second behind Farley with 5,719 votes; in the November 2, 2010 General election, Wheeler took the first seat by 32 votes with 29,073 votes, and Farley took second against Republican nominee Ken Smalley; Farley would later serve in the Arizona Senate.
- 2012: Redistricted to District 10, and with incumbent Republican Representatives Kimberly Yee running for Arizona Senate and James Weiers retiring, and with incumbent Republican Representative Ted Vogt redistricted from District 30, Wheeler ran in the three-way August 28, 2012 Democratic Primary, placing first with 12,235 votes, and Stefanie Mach placed second; Wheeler won the first seat in the November 6, 2012 General election with 43,058 votes, and Mach won the second seat against Republican nominees Representative Vogt and Todd Clodfelter.
- 2014: Wheeler was re-elected.
