= David Stringer =

American politician

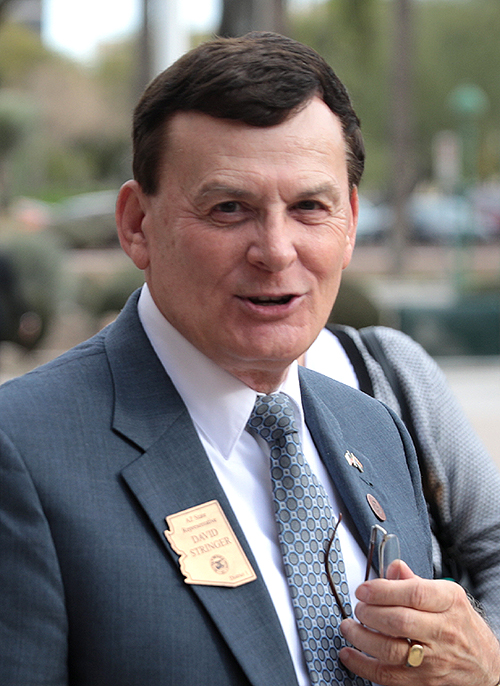
- Stringer in 2019

Member of the Arizona House of Representatives from the 1st district
- In office January 9, 2017 – March 27, 2019
- Preceded by: Karen Fann
- Succeeded by: Steve Pierce

Personal details
- Born: 1947 or 1948 (age 78–79) Anchorage, Alaska, U.S.
- Party: Republican
- Profession: Politician

David Stringer is an American politician who was elected in 2016 to represent district 1 in the Arizona House of Representatives. After being reelected in 2018, he resigned in March 2019 after refusing to cooperate with an ethics investigation into 1983 charges against him for sexually molesting two boys. A member of the Republican Party, Stringer has been co-chair of the GOP finance committee for Yavapai County, in addition to a Republican precinct committeeman and state committeeman.

== Education ==
Stringer is a graduate of George Washington University and the University of Baltimore School of Law. He earned an MA in curriculum and instruction from Arizona State University in 2018.

== Career ==
Prior to running for state office, Stringer was elected as a Republican precinct committeeman and state committeeman for Yavapai County, and had been co-chair of the county's GOP finance committee.

In 2016, Stringer and incumbent Noel W. Campbell won the two seats in the Republican primary for district 1 of the Arizona House of Representatives, defeating Yavapai County Supervisor Chip Davis. They went on to defeat Democratic candidate Peter Pierson and Green candidate Haryaksha Gregor Knauer in the general election.

=== Allegations and resignation ===
In early 2018, Stringer had been recorded as saying that sex trafficking was not a concern and that, "I don't like to demonize it."

In June 2018, during a livestreamed speech at the Yavapai County Republican Men's Forum, Stringer commented that "there aren't enough white kids to go around", in reference to public school integration. He went on to say that illegal immigration is "politically destabilizing" and is "an existential threat to the United States". Stringer's comments were derided as racist by the Anti-Defamation League and ProgressNow Arizona, while the Arizona Republican Party and denounced his comments. Stringer defended his statements by saying he "wasn't making a value judgement" and "wasn't denigrating anybody", while apologizing to anyone he offended.

In November 2018, Stringer was pressured to resign from leadership positions in House committees due to remarks made to Arizona State University students following a presentation at a political history and leadership club. Stringer stated that when European immigrants come to the United States that "After the second or third generation, everybody looks the same, everybody talks the same. But that's not the case with African Americans and other racial groups, because they don't melt in, they don't blend in." Stringer subsequently resigned from his position as chair of the House Sentencing and Recidivism Reform Committee. On December 4, the Prescott City Council voted six to one to pass a resolution "that demands Stringer step down immediately so that a replacement can be named before the legislative session begins in 2019", which was supported by the mayor. However, he ran to keep his seat and was reelected in the general election, coming in second after fellow incumbent Noel Campbell and defeating Democrats Jan Manolis and Ed Gogek.

On January 25, 2019, the Phoenix New Times reported that Stringer had been charged in 1983 with five sex offenses, including two child pornography charges, while he was living in Baltimore. He had accepted a plea bargain on charges of paying two boys for sex, one of whom was developmentally disabled, and was sentenced to five years' probation. In 1990, he had the charges expunged from his record. In response to calls for his resignation, Stringer confirmed that he had been arrested and charged with the offenses but stated that he would not be resigning from the Arizona House. On March 27, 2019, facing a deadline to hand over documents regarding his 2018 comments and the 1983 sex offenses, he abruptly resigned from the Arizona House.
