= Bobby Wilson (Arizona politician) =

Arizona lawyer and politician (born 1944)

Robert Wilson (born September 3, 1944 in San Francisco, California) was a candidate for the Republican nomination for District 2 of the Arizona State Senate. He was defeated by his opponent Shelley Kais in the August 28, 2018 Republican primary election.

Wilson told the Associated Press that in 1963 he fatally shot his mother, in self-defense.

Wilson is a retired lawyer.

Court records list Wilson's surname as "Wiste", as does the California Birth Index.

== Publications ==
Wilson has written five books:

- Wilson, Bobby (2010). Bobby's Trials. Apache Publishing Company. ISBN 978-1617929168.
- Wilson, Bobby (2011). Renegade Barrister. Apache Publishing Company. ISBN 978-1618424761.
- Wilson, Bobby (2012). State of Mind. Apache Publishing Company. ISBN 978-1620954331.
- Wilson, Bobby (2012). State of Unrest. Apache Publishing Company. ISBN 978-1623093785.
- Wilson, Bobby (2016). Killing Timothy McVeigh: The Hidden al Queda Attack on Oklahoma City. Apache Publishing Company. ISBN 978-1483574998.

Apache Publishing Company is operated by Wilson's wife Eileen Marie Wilson in Sahuarita, Arizona.
