= Noel W. Campbell =

American politician (1941–2026)

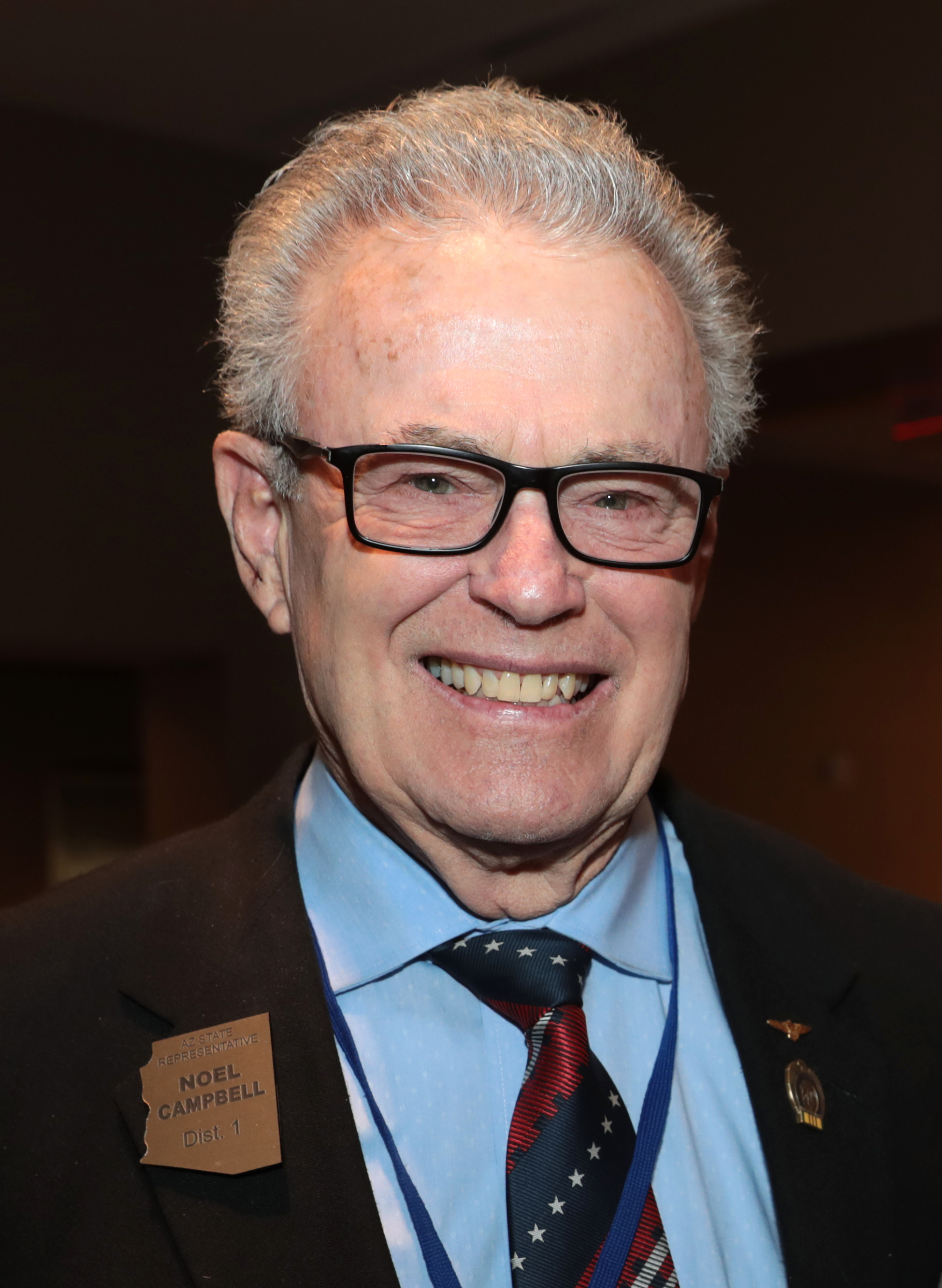
- Campbell in 2019

Member of the Arizona House of Representatives from the 1st district
- In office January 5, 2015 – January 11, 2021
- Preceded by: Andy Tobin
- Succeeded by: Judy Burges

Personal details
- Born: December 1941
- Died: January 24, 2026 (aged 84)
- Party: Republican

Noel W. Campbell (December 1941 – January 24, 2026) was an American politician who was a Republican member of the Arizona House of Representatives, representing Arizona's Legislative District One, alongside Steve Pierce.

== Political experience ==
Campbell was elected in 2014, and this is his first elected position. He succeeded Speaker of the House Andy Tobin. He previously served in the Navy, retiring from the Naval Reserve with the rank of Commander. He also served in the U.S. Customs Service, the U.S. Forest Service, and was a small business owner.

== Elections ==
In 2014, Campbell successfully ran alongside Karen Fann. Campbell came in second behind Fann and ahead of Democratic challenger Frank Cucciain in the general election with 43,864 votes.

== Accusations of domestic violence ==
In December 2020, Campbell’s wife accused him of domestic violence according to a police report taken by the City of Prescott Police Department. According to Campbell’s wife, the former state representative pushed her multiple times until she fell over and then “struck her multiple times in the neck and multiple times in the face.” Campbell’s wife did not press charges as she believed Campbell’s violence was a result of early stages of dementia and that they would be seeking medical treatment.

== Death ==
Campbell died in a traffic collision on January 24, 2026, at the age of 84.
