= Domingo DeGrazia =

American politician

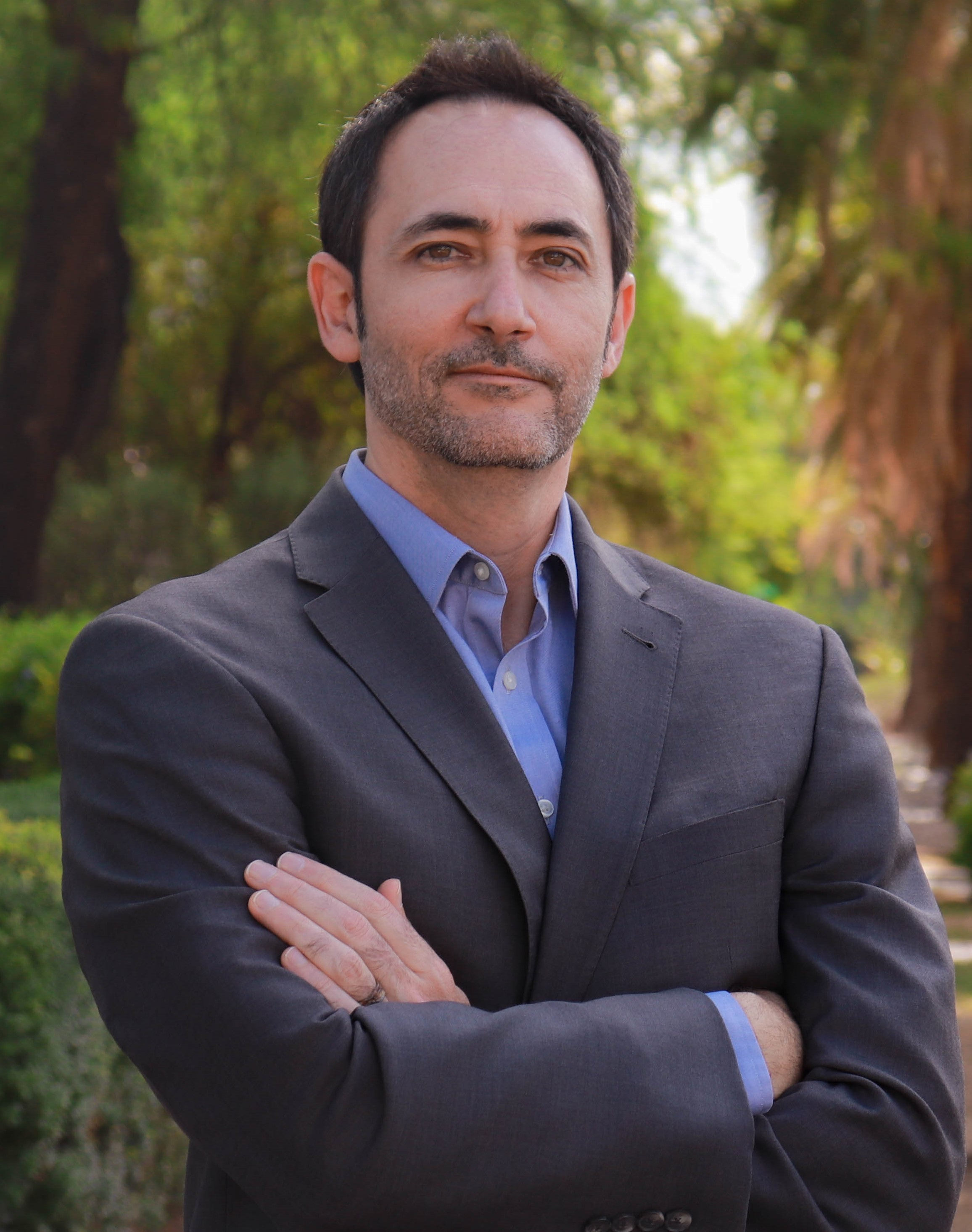
Domingo DeGrazia

Domingo DeGrazia is an attorney from the Southwest United States. He practices appellate law, is a guitarist and music composer, and former member of the Arizona House of Representatives representing District 10 from 2019 to 2023. DeGrazia was elected in 2018, defeating incumbent Republican State Representative Todd Clodfelter. DeGrazia is a citizen of the Eastern Band of Cherokee Indians through his mother Carol Locust. DeGrazia's father is Southwestern artist Ettore DeGrazia.

DeGrazia graduated from Embry–Riddle Aeronautical University, and received his Juris Doctor degree from Oklahoma City University law school, before practicing law as a trial attorney in the juvenile court system.
