= Bret Roberts =

American politician

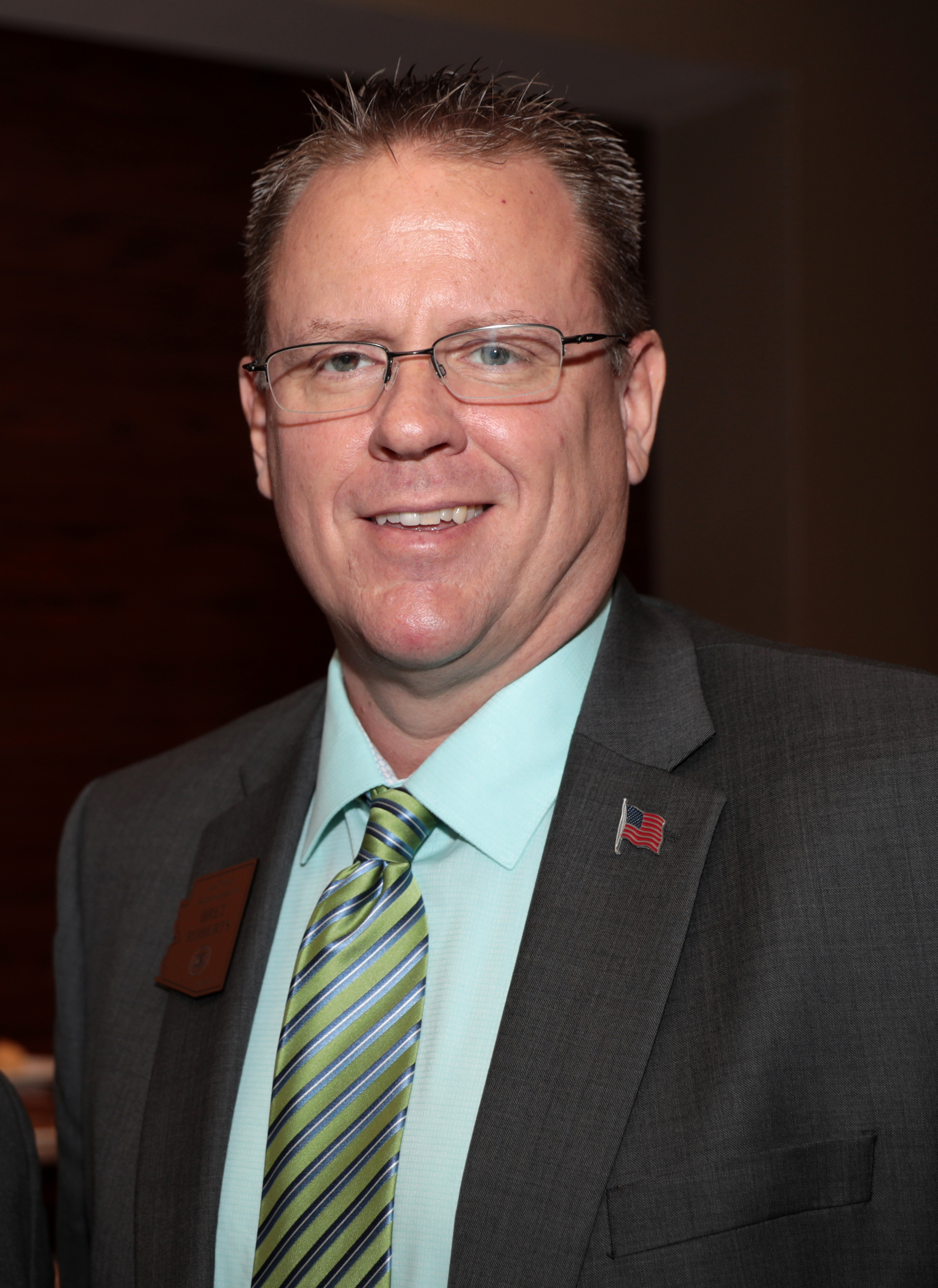
- Roberts in 2019

Member of the Arizona House of Representatives from the 11th district
- In office January 14, 2019 – September 30, 2021 Serving with Mark Finchem
- Preceded by: Vince Leach
- Succeeded by: Teresa Martinez

Personal details
- Party: Republican

Bret Roberts is an American politician and a former Republican member of the Arizona House of Representatives representing District 11 from 2019 to 2021. Roberts was elected in 2018 to succeed State Representative Vince Leach, who instead ran for Arizona State Senate. On September 8, 2021, Roberts announced that he would resign from the Arizona House of Representatives for family reasons effective on September 30, 2021.

Prior to being elected to the legislature, Roberts worked in the Maricopa County Sheriff's Office as a Detention Officer, and subsequently was elected Constable.
