= Diego Rodriguez (Arizona politician) =

American politician

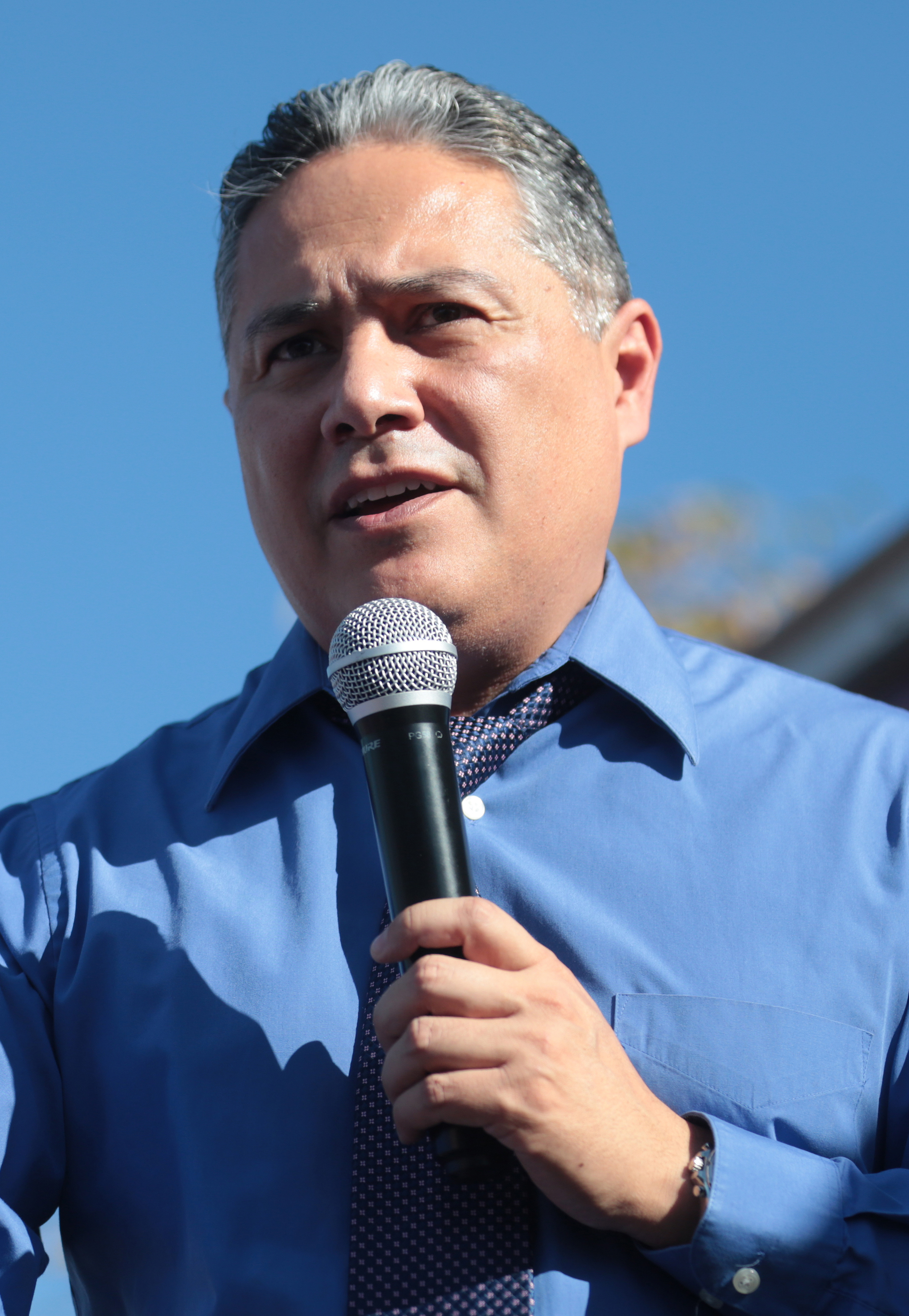
- Rodriguez in 2018

Member of the Arizona House of Representatives from the 27th district
- In office January 14, 2019 – December 16, 2021
- Preceded by: Rebecca Rios
- Succeeded by: Marcelino Quiñonez

Personal details
- Party: Democratic
- Education: University of Notre Dame (BBA); University of Arizona (JD)

Diego Rodriguez is an American attorney and politician who served as a member of the Arizona House of Representatives for the 27th district from 2019 to 2021. He was elected in 2018 to succeed State Representative Rebecca Rios, who instead ran for the Arizona Senate.

Rodriguez graduated from the University of Notre Dame, and eventually relocated to Arizona, where he graduated from the James E. Rogers College of Law and later started his own law firm. In 2021, he resigned from the House and declared his candidacy for the 2022 Arizona Attorney General election. He announced he was withdrawing from the Attorney General election on April 1, 2022.
