= Tyler Pace =

American politician

Member of the Arizona Senate from the 25th district
- In office January 14, 2019 – January 9, 2023
- Preceded by: Bob Worsley
- Succeeded by: Sine Kerr

Personal details
- Party: Republican

Tyler Pace is an American politician and businessman. Pace was elected in 2018 to serve in the Arizona State Senate representing District 25 as a member of the Republican Party. Pace succeeded incumbent Republican State Senator Bob Worsley, who withdrew his name from the ballot prior to the Republican primary. He was defeated for reelection in 2022.

== Early career ==
Pace is a native of Mesa, Arizona, and attended Arizona State University before becoming involved in the private sector where he bought and sold several businesses.
