= Steve Pierce =

American politician

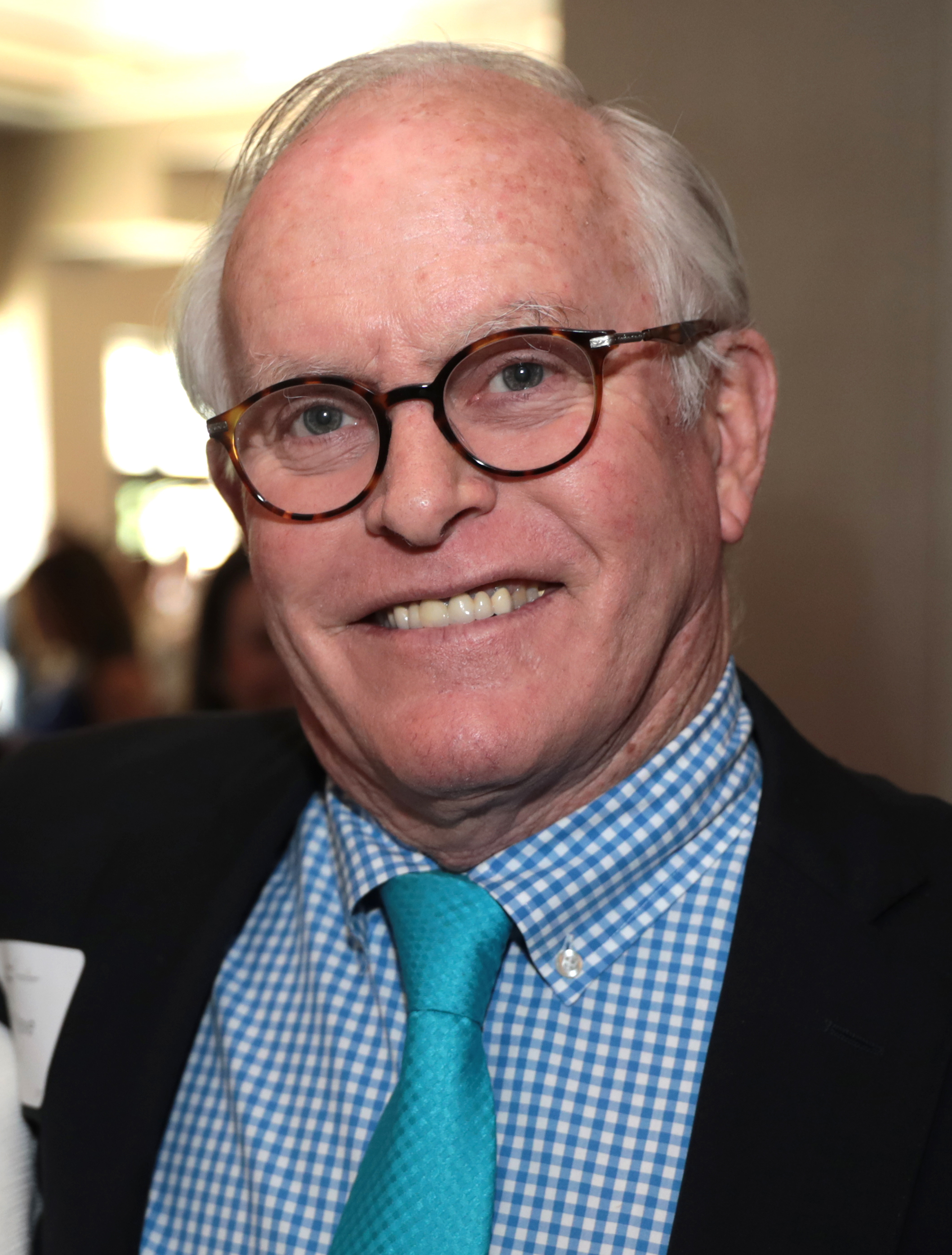
- Pierce in 2019

Member of the Arizona House of Representatives from the 1st district
- In office April 3, 2019 – January 11, 2021
- Preceded by: David Stringer
- Succeeded by: Quang Nguyen

Member of the Arizona Senate from the 1st district
- In office January 5, 2009 – January 9, 2017
- Preceded by: Tom O'Halleran
- Succeeded by: Karen Fann

President of the Arizona Senate
- In office November 10, 2011 – January 14, 2013
- Preceded by: Russell Pearce
- Succeeded by: Andy Biggs

Personal details
- Born: 1950 (age 75–76) Phoenix, Arizona, U.S.
- Party: Republican
- Spouse: Joan
- Children: 4
- Education: University of Arizona
- Occupation: Rancher, politician

Steve Pierce (born 1950) is an American politician from Arizona. Pierce was a Republican member of the Arizona House of Representatives for District 1, serving until 2021. He was a member of the Arizona Senate from the 1st district. He was president of the Arizona State Senate from November 10, 2011 through 2013.

== Early life ==
In 1950, Pierce was born in Phoenix, Arizona. Pierce was raised in Prescott, Arizona. Pierce attended Prescott High School.

== Education ==
In 1972, Pierce earned a Bachelor of Science degree in Animal science from University of Arizona.

== Career ==
Pierce's career began as a rancher.

Pierce's political career began in 2009 when he became the Majority Whip in Arizona State Senate. In November 2011, Pierce became the President of Arizona State Senate until January 2013.

On March 27, 2019, when David Stringer resigned, Pierce was selected by county supervisors in April 2019 to become a member of the Arizona House of Representatives for District 1.

== Personal life ==
Pierce's wife is Joan. They have four children. Pierce lives in Prescott, Arizona.
