= Kirsten Engel =

American politician (born 1961)

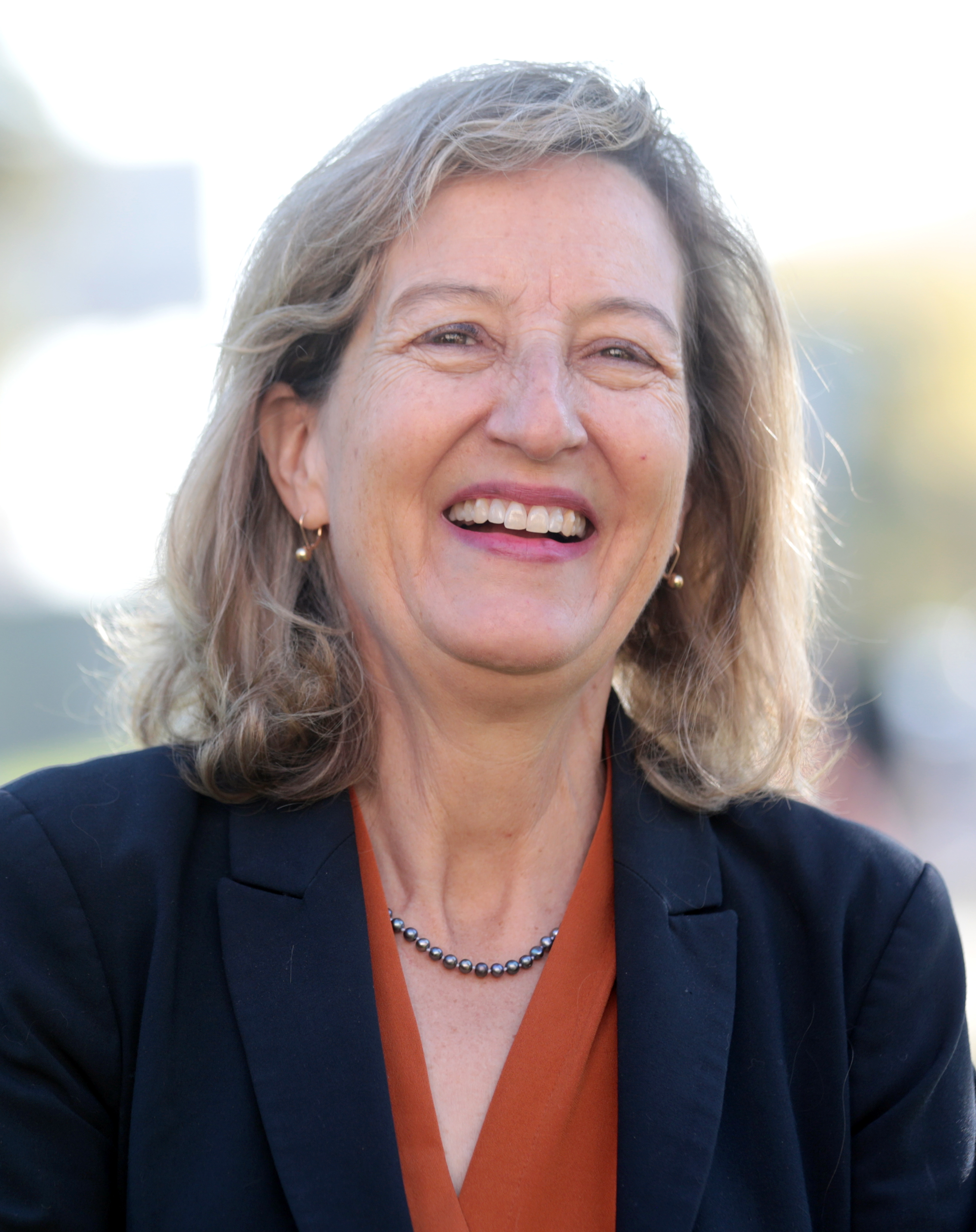
- Engel in 2023

Member of the Arizona Senate from the 10th district
- In office January 11, 2021 – September 8, 2021
- Preceded by: David Bradley
- Succeeded by: Stephanie Stahl Hamilton

Member of the Arizona House of Representatives from the 10th district
- In office January 9, 2017 – January 11, 2021
- Preceded by: Stefanie Mach; Bruce Wheeler
- Succeeded by: Stephanie Stahl Hamilton

Personal details
- Born: 1961/1962 (age 64–65) Chicago, Illinois
- Party: Democratic
- Children: 1
- Education: Brown University (BA); Northwestern University (JD)
- Website: Campaign website

Kirsten Engel is an American lawyer and politician who served as a member of the Arizona House of Representatives and the Arizona Senate for the 10th district from 2017 to 2021. She is a member of the Democratic Party.

Engel started her career at the Environmental Protection Agency, and later worked as an assistant state attorney general before transitioning to education. Engel has been a professor at the University of Arizona since 2005, specializing in environmental and administrative law.

In both 2022 and 2024, Engel ran unsuccessfully for U.S. House of Representatives from Arizona's 6th congressional district.

== Early life and education ==
Engel was born and raised in Chicago. She graduated magna cum laude from Brown University in 1983. Engel graduated from Northwestern University School of Law in 1986.

== Legal career ==
After law school, Engel clerked for Judge Myron H. Bright of the United States Court of Appeals for the Eighth Circuit. She then worked for the United States Environmental Protection Agency and later for Earthjustice.

While at Earthjustice, Engel was condemned by the U.S. Court of Appeals for the District of Columbia Circuit for overbilling the federal government for "imaginary or unnecessary legal services".

Engel later served as an assistant attorney general in the Massachusetts Attorney General's Office until 2005. Afterwards, she joined the faculty at the University of Arizona's James E. Rogers College of Law where she teaches environmental and administrative law.

== Arizona House of Representatives ==
=== Elections ===
Engel was elected to the Arizona House of Representatives in 2016 and assumed office in January 2017. Engel did not seek re-election to the House in 2020 and instead ran for the state senate.

=== Committee assignments ===
- Energy, Environment and Natural Resources Committee
- Judiciary Committee
- Judiciary and Public Safety Committee
- Natural Resources, Energy and Water Committee

== Arizona Senate ==
=== Elections ===
Engel ran for the Arizona Senate in 2020. She won the election and assumed office in January 2021 and served until her resignation in September 2021 to run for Congress.

=== Committee assignments ===
- Ethics Committee
- Finance Committee
- Judiciary Committee
- Natural Resources, Energy and Water Committee

== Congressional elections ==
=== 2022 ===
In 2022, Engel launched her congressional campaign for Arizona's 6th congressional district. She lost to Republican Juan Ciscomani.

=== 2024 ===
She ran in a rematch against Ciscomani in the 2024 election for Arizona's 6th congressional district. In the November 2024 general election, Engel was again defeated by Ciscomani.

== Political positions ==
Engel supports expanding solar energy in Arizona. She has expressed support for stronger federal regulations to reduce air and water pollution from power plants. Engel has called for taking steps to make "it a pain to drive" gasoline-powered vehicles.

Engel supports increasing funding for public schools and has said that observing conditions at her daughter's public school motivated her to run for office initially.

Engel characterized the situation at the U.S.–Mexico border as "a humanitarian crisis" and expressed support for reforming asylum-seeking processes.

== Personal life ==
Engel is married with one daughter and lives in Tucson, Arizona.

Arizona Senate
Preceded by David Bradley	Member of the Arizona Senate from the 10th district 2021	Succeeded by Stephanie Stahl Hamilton
