= Karen Fann =

American politician (born 1954)

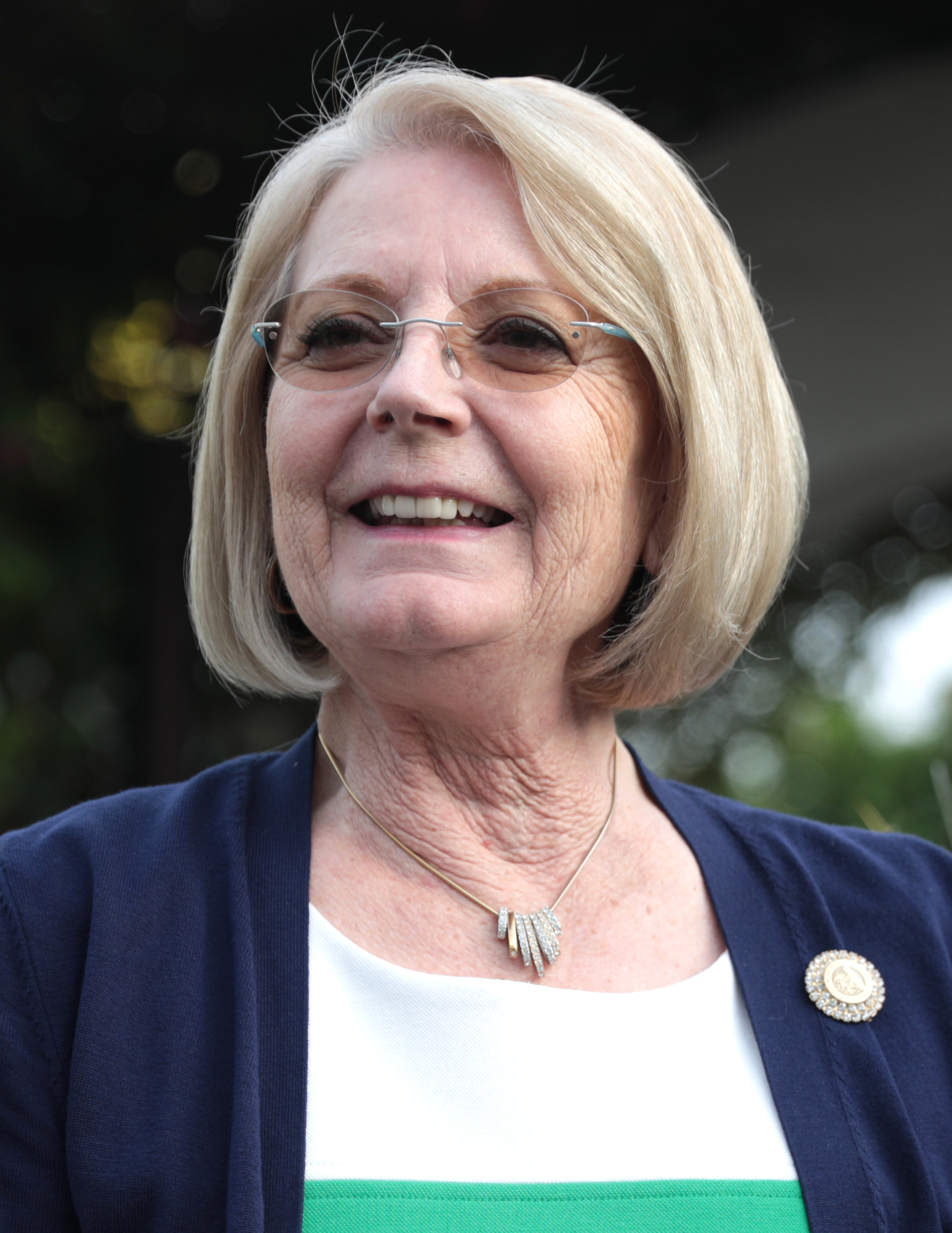
- Fann in 2021

President of the Arizona Senate
- In office January 14, 2019 – January 9, 2023
- Preceded by: Steve Yarbrough
- Succeeded by: Warren Petersen

Member of the Arizona Senate from the 1st district
- In office January 9, 2017 – January 9, 2023
- Preceded by: Steve Pierce
- Succeeded by: Ken Bennett

Member of the Arizona House of Representatives from the 1st district
- In office January 5, 2011 – January 9, 2017
- Preceded by: Lucy Mason
- Succeeded by: David Stringer

Personal details
- Born: Karen Elizabeth Fann; September 1, 1954 (age 72)
- Party: Republican
- Spouse: James McKown
- Website: Campaign website

Karen Fann (born September 1, 1954) is a former Republican member of the Arizona Senate, representing Arizona Legislative District 1. Fann became President of the Arizona Senate in 2019, and served until 2023.

After Joe Biden won the 2020 presidential election and Donald Trump and other Republicans made false claims of electoral fraud, Fann ordered an audit of the election results in Maricopa County. The audit was widely seen as an illegitimate "effort to undermine valid election results". Fann announced in November 2021 that she would not run for re-election in 2022.

== Career ==
Fann is the second female Senate President in the history of Arizona. She was first elected in November 2016 to represent Legislative District 1, which covers 8,000 square miles throughout Yavapai County and portions of Maricopa County. She previously served this district from 2011 to 2016 as a State Representative. Fann moved to Prescott at the age of four and has been a lifelong Republican. She continues to serve as a precinct committeeman and is a member of the Rotary International and Elks. She currently serves as the vice chair of both the Finance Committee and the Transportation and Technology Committee and as a member of the Natural Resources, Energy and Water Committee.

Fann's previous experience includes: 2019–2020 Arizona Senate Chairman, Rules; 2002–2009 Town of Chino Valley Mayor and Councilman; 2007–2009 BQAZ Statewide Transportation Board; 2005–2009 Chairman and Board, Central Yavapai Metropolitan Planning Organization (CYMPO); 2006–2009 Chairman and Board, Upper Verde River Watershed Protection Coalition; 2005–2008 Governors Rural Water Legislative Study Committee; 2002–2007 and 1992–1994 Northern Council of Governments (NACOG); 1992–1995 Prescott City Mayor Pro Tem and Councilman.

=== 2020 Presidential Election Audit ===
On December 12, 2020, Gretchen Jacobs, one of Arizona's most powerful and well paid lobbyists, sent a message to White House staffer Stephanie Grisham that she had spoken with Fann and “asked her what would cause her to withhold the electors” needed to certify the results. According to Jacobs, Fann told her “if we could prove fraud — that would be a game-changer.” Jacobs then asked Grisham if she could help find $104,000 to hire a political consultant to work on finding evidence of fraud. “I can’t bear that we would lose this over not having $100k to prove what we know is fraud,” Jacobs wrote to Grisham. Two days later, on December 14, 2020, Jacobs attended the White House Christmas Party with Donald Trump. The following day, on December 15, 2020, Fann she and Senator Eddie Farnsworth were issuing subpoenas for the scanned ballot images and a forensic audit of all voting machines used in the 2020 election.

In April 2021, Fann ordered an audit of the election results in Maricopa County, hiring a firm that was founded by a pro-Trump conspiracy theorist who promoted false claims of fraud.

Under Fann, the Republican-controlled Senate invoked claims of fraud and used its subpoena power to demand the county turn over all its 2.1 million ballots and related presidential election materials to the Senate. In response, the Maricopa County Board of Supervisors provided a massive volume of documents to the Senate, but Republican senators persisted in making fraud claims despite those having been rejected by the Arizona Supreme Court and other courts. Multiple previous checks, including tests of ballot tabulating machines and software both before and after the election, as well as a hand count of a ballot sample, all confirmed the county properly administered the election. When it refused, Fann sought a resolution to hold the Maricopa County Board in contempt, which failed when Republican Paul Boyer resisted Fann's pressure to change his vote and joined all Democrats in opposition.

Maricopa County Supervisor Steve Gallardo, the only Democrat on the five-member county board, expressed concern that the efforts of state senate Republicans to question the election outcome could cause violence. The Arizona Secretary of State, Katie Hobbs, criticized the audit for lax chain of custody procedures, calling it "a significant departure from standard best practices." After her criticism of its procedures resulted in her receiving death threats, the Arizona Department of Public Safety assigned a security detail to guard Hobbs and her staff.

Fann made a false allegation, later amplified by Trump in a May 15 post on his blog, that Maricopa County election officials deleted the voter database after the election. Maricopa County Recorder Stephen Richer, a Republican who oversees elections, tweeted that Trump's post was "unhinged", noting he was looking at the database on his computer at that moment. Richer added, "We can’t indulge these insane lies any longer." The auditors later acknowledged the database had not been deleted.

A Colorado expert, working for Hobbs' office, cited haphazard procedures and the absence of effective security characterized the audit process. Despite the resistance and the temporary loss of the arena site it used, Fann said the audit will continue. The United States Department of Justice (DOJ) sent a letter to Fann that expressed concerns that the audit could violate federal laws regarding ballot custody and voter intimidation. In response to the DOJ letter and the public backlash, Fann scrapped plans to canvass voters at their home addresses to confirm their voter registration information. The Maricopa County Board, of which four of five members are Republicans, sharply rebutted Fann's claims in a 12-page letter. The board also urged Fann to close the audit, which she refused.

On May 17, the Maricopa County Board of Supervisors held a hearing to dispute her allegations of wrongdoing by county officials. Republican board chairman Jack Sellers stated that the allegations were actually due to the incompetence of the auditors and accused Fann of an "attempt at legitimatizing a grift disguised as an audit." After consulting with the United States Department of Homeland Security and the Election Assistance Commission about the machines used to tabulate the ballots that were turned over in response to the Senate subpoena, Hobbs concluded that the equipment had been compromised and became impossible for the county alone to recertify for future use. While they were in the care and custody of the Senate's contractors, the chain of custody procedures that are required to guarantee their post-audit integrity were not maintained, causing an inability to use them without lessor confirmation that their performance could be recertified. The county spent over $20,000 to lease voting machines in order to conduct two local elections while the contractor possessed those that had been subpoenaed, and the costs of recertifying the surrendered machines upon their return would be in the six-figure range.

As a result of the audit, Maricopa County had to spend nearly $3 million to replace voting equipment because the equipment had been tainted by the company auditing the equipment.

A preliminary report on the results of the audit, despite the expenditure of some six million dollars raised from Trump supporters determined to overturn the election, found no evidence of fraud.

Fann received an FBI subpoena in June 2022 relating to an investigation into Trump's efforts to pressure state officials after the election. The Director of Communications for Arizona Senate Republicans characterized the subpoena as "part of the Biden Administration's political theatrics as they look into 'January 6'."

Political offices
Preceded by Steve Yarbrough	President of the Arizona Senate; 2019–2023	Succeeded by Warren Petersen
