= 2024 Arizona House of Representatives election =

2024 Arizona House of Representatives elections
- November 5, 2024

All 60 seats in the Arizona House of Representatives 31 seats needed for a majority
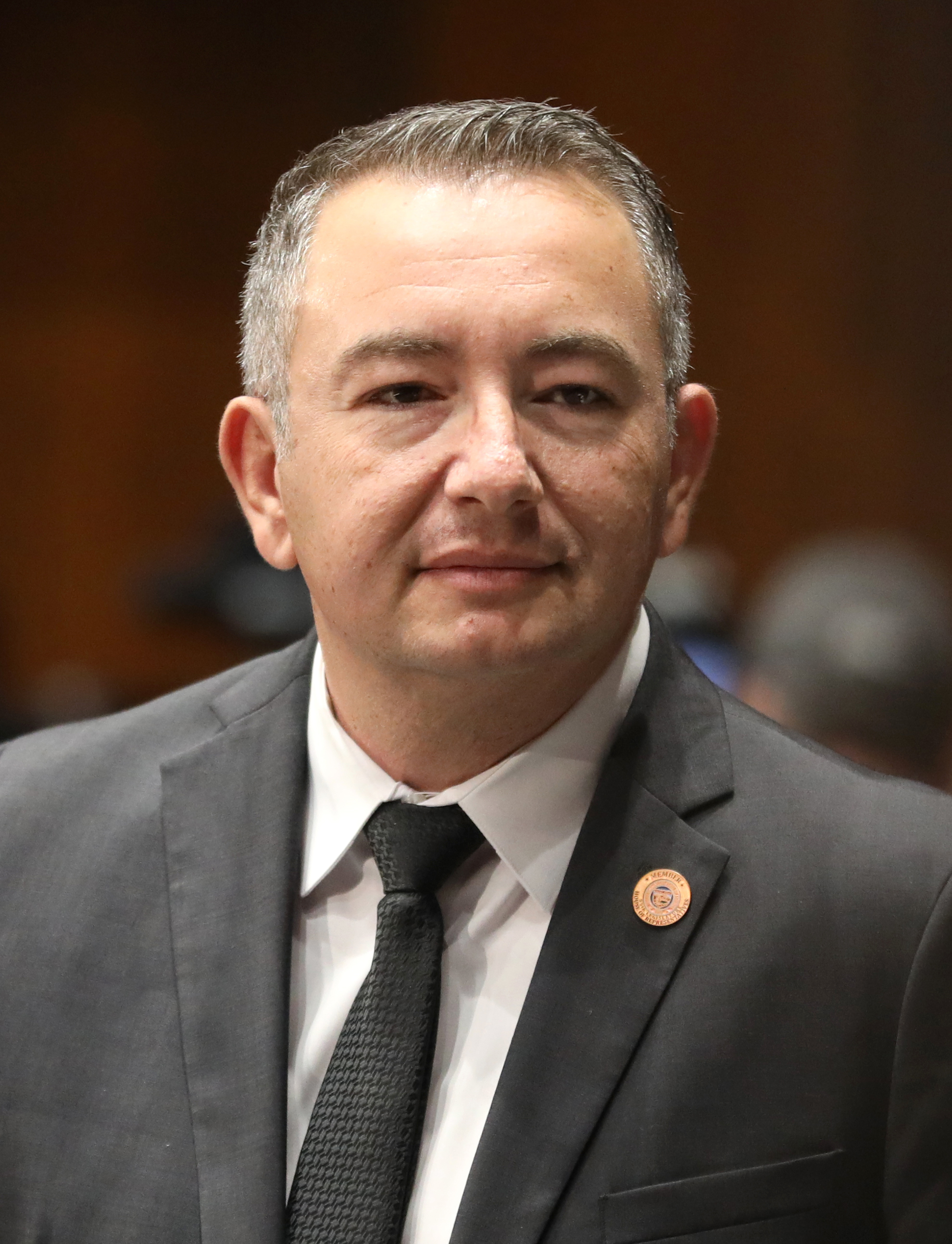

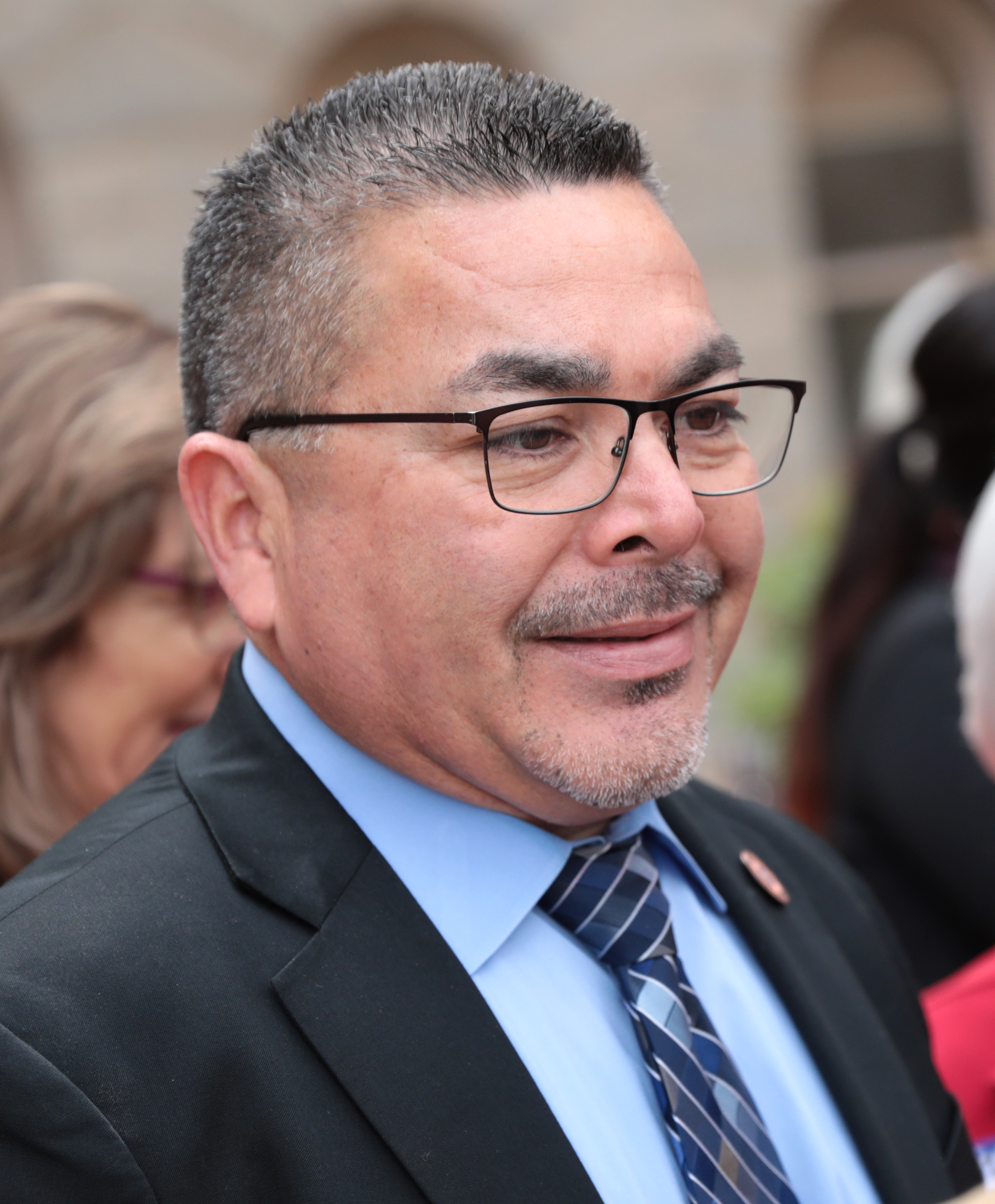
	Majority party	Minority party
Leader	Ben Toma (retiring)	Lupe Contreras
Party	Republican	Democratic
Leader since	January 9, 2023	June 21, 2023
Leader's seat	27th–Peoria	22nd–Cashion
Last election	31 seats, 58.15%	29 seats, 41.85%
Seats won	33	27
Seat change	▲2	▼2
Popular vote	2,412,962	1,951,102
Percentage	54.75%	44.27%
Swing	▼3.40%	▲2.42%
- Results: Republican hold Republican gain Democratic hold Democratic gain
Speaker before election
Ben Toma
Republican
Elected Speaker
Steve Montenegro
Republican

The 2024 Arizona House of Representatives election was held on November 5, 2024. Voters elected all 60 members of the Arizona House of Representatives to serve two-year terms, with two members chosen from each of the state's 30 legislative districts. Primary elections were held on July 30, 2024.

Prior to the elections, Republicans held a slim majority of 31 members over the 29 Democrats. To flip control of the chamber, Democrats needed to net two seats.

== Partisan background ==
In the 2020 presidential election, Joe Biden and Donald Trump each won 15 of Arizona's 30 legislative districts.

Biden 40–50% 50–60% 60–70% 70–80% / Trump 50–60% 60–70% 70–80%

== Predictions ==
Source	Ranking	As of
270toWin	Tilt D (flip)	July 13, 2024
CNalysis	Tossup	November 1, 2024
Sabato's Crystal Ball	Tossup	June 18, 2024

== Overview of results ==
Parliament diagram of AZ House elections 2024
Party	Seats
Republican Party	33
Democratic Party	27
Total	60

== Results by district ==
† - Incumbent not seeking re-election

District	Incumbent	Party	Elected representative	Party
1st	Selina Bliss	Rep	Selina Bliss	Rep
1st	Quang Nguyen	Rep	Quang Nguyen	Rep
2nd	Judy Schwiebert†	Dem	Stephanie Simacek	Dem
2nd	Justin Wilmeth	Rep	Justin Wilmeth	Rep
3rd	Joseph Chaplik	Rep	Joseph Chaplik	Rep
3rd	Alexander Kolodin	Rep	Alexander Kolodin	Rep
4th	Matt Gress	Rep	Matt Gress	Rep
4th	Eric Meyer† (Note: Appointed August 16, 2024, to fill the vacancy following Laura Terech's resignation.)	Dem	Pamela Carter	Rep
5th	Sarah Liguori (Note: Appointed February 15, 2024, to fill the vacancy following Jennifer Longdon's resignation.)	Dem	Sarah Liguori	Dem
5th	Charles Lucking (Note: Appointed February 8, 2024, to fill the vacancy following Amish Shah's resignation.)	Dem	Aaron Marquez	Dem
6th	Mae Peshlakai	Dem	Mae Peshlakai	Dem
6th	Myron Tsosie	Dem	Myron Tsosie	Dem
7th	David Cook†	Rep	Walter Blackman	Rep
7th	David Marshall	Rep	David Marshall	Rep
8th	Melody Hernandez†	Dem	Janeen Connolly	Dem
8th	Deborah Nardozzi† (Note: Appointed April 4, 2024, to fill the vacancy following Jevin Hodge's resignation. Hodge was originally appointed on February 2, 2024, to fill the vacancy following Athena Salman's resignation.)	Dem	Brian Garcia	Dem
9th	Lorena Austin	Dem	Lorena Austin	Dem
9th	Seth Blattman	Dem	Seth Blattman	Dem
10th	Justin Heap†	Rep	Justin Olson	Rep
10th	Barbara Parker†	Rep	Ralph Heap	Rep
11th	Oscar De Los Santos	Dem	Oscar De Los Santos	Dem
11th	Junelle Cavero (Note: Appointed April 17, 2024, to fill the vacancy following Marcelino Quiñonez's resignation.)	Dem	Junelle Cavero	Dem
12th	Patty Contreras	Dem	Patty Contreras	Dem
12th	Stacey Travers	Dem	Stacey Travers	Dem
13th	Jennifer Pawlik†	Dem	Jeff Weninger	Rep
13th	Julie Willoughby (Note: Appointed May 5, 2023, to fill the vacancy following Liz Harris's expulsion.)	Rep	Julie Willoughby	Rep
14th	Travis Grantham†	Rep	Khyl Powell	Rep
14th	Laurin Hendrix	Rep	Laurin Hendrix	Rep
15th	Jacqueline Parker†	Rep	Michael Way	Rep
15th	Neal Carter	Rep	Neal Carter	Rep
16th	Teresa Martinez	Rep	Teresa Martinez	Rep
16th	Keith Seaman	Dem	Chris Lopez	Rep
17th	Rachel Jones	Rep	Rachel Jones	Rep
17th	Cory McGarr	Rep	Kevin Volk	Dem
18th	Nancy Gutierrez	Dem	Nancy Gutierrez	Dem
18th	Christopher Mathis	Dem	Christopher Mathis	Dem
19th	Gail Griffin	Rep	Gail Griffin	Rep
19th	Lupe Diaz	Rep	Lupe Diaz	Rep
20th	Betty Villegas (Note: Appointed July 31, 2023, to fill the vacancy following Andrés Cano's resignation.)	Dem	Betty Villegas	Dem
20th	Alma Hernandez	Dem	Alma Hernandez	Dem
21st	Consuelo Hernandez	Dem	Consuelo Hernandez	Dem
21st	Stephanie Stahl Hamilton	Dem	Stephanie Stahl Hamilton	Dem
22nd	Lupe Contreras	Dem	Lupe Contreras	Dem
22nd	Elda Luna-Nájera (Note: Appointed March 1, 2024, to fill the vacancy following Leezah Sun's resignation.)	Dem	Elda Luna-Nájera	Dem
23rd	Mariana Sandoval	Dem	Mariana Sandoval	Dem
23rd	Michele Pena	Rep	Michele Pena	Rep
24th	Analise Ortiz†	Dem	Anna Abeytia	Dem
24th	Lydia Hernandez	Dem	Lydia Hernandez	Dem
25th	Tim Dunn†	Rep	Nick Kupper	Rep
25th	Michael Carbone	Rep	Michael Carbone	Rep
26th	Cesar Aguilar	Dem	Cesar Aguilar	Dem
26th	Quantá Crews (Note: Appointed June 7, 2023, to fill the vacancy following Flavio Bravo's resignation.)	Dem	Quantá Crews	Dem
27th	Ben Toma†	Rep	Lisa Fink	Rep
27th	Kevin Payne†	Rep	Tony Rivero	Rep
28th	Beverly Pingerelli	Rep	Beverly Pingerelli	Rep
28th	David Livingston	Rep	David Livingston	Rep
29th	Steve Montenegro	Rep	Steve Montenegro	Rep
29th	Austin Smith†	Rep	James Taylor	Rep
30th	Leo Biasiucci	Rep	Leo Biasiucci	Rep
30th	John Gillette	Rep	John Gillette	Rep

== Retirements ==
=== Republican ===
- District 7: David Cook was term-limited.
- District 10: Justin Heap ran for Maricopa County Recorder.
- District 10: Barbara Parker retired.
- District 14: Travis Grantham was term-limited.
- District 15: Jacqueline Parker retired.
- District 25: Tim Dunn ran for the Arizona State Senate.
- District 27: Ben Toma ran for the U.S. House of Representatives.
- District 27: Kevin Payne was term-limited.
- District 29: Austin Smith withdrew amid accusations of signature fraud.

=== Democratic ===
- District 2: Judy Schwiebert ran for the Arizona State Senate.
- District 4: Laura Terech retired.
- District 8: Melody Hernandez was running for the Arizona State Senate, but withdrew after her petitions were challenged for an insufficient number of valid signatures.
- District 8: Deborah Nardozzi retired.
- District 13: Jennifer Pawlik retired.
- District 24: Analise Ortiz ran for the Arizona State Senate.

== Detailed results ==
=== District 1 ===
Primary election results
Party	Candidate	Votes	%
Republican Party primary results
Republican	Quang Nguyen (incumbent)	38,264	44.26%
Republican	Selina Bliss (incumbent)	34,074	39.41%
Republican	Shawn Dell Wildman	14,117	16.33%
Total votes		86,455	100%
Democratic Party primary results
Democratic	Marcia Smith	16,516	53.43%
Democratic	Jay Ruby	14,397	46.57%
Total votes		30,913	100%

General election results
Party	Candidate	Votes	%
Republican	Selina Bliss (incumbent)	88,691	33.91%
Republican	Quang Nguyen (incumbent)	87,726	33.54%
Democratic	Marcia Smith	44,199	16.9%
Democratic	Jay Ruby	40,911	15.64%
Total votes		261,527	100%
Republican hold			
Republican hold			

=== District 2 ===
- Neil DeSanti withdrew from the Republican primary. (Note: The candidate withdrew from the election.)

Primary election results
Party	Candidate	Votes	%
Republican Party primary results
Republican	Justin Wilmeth (incumbent)	14,896	54.52%
Republican	Ari Daniel Bradshaw	12,382	45.32%
Republican	Danielle Hagen (write-in)	43	0.16%
Total votes		27,321	100%
Democratic Party primary results
Democratic	Stephanie Simacek	14,072	100%
Total votes		14,072	100%

General election results
Party	Candidate	Votes	%
Democratic	Stephanie Simacek	47,810	30.35%
Republican	Justin Wilmeth (incumbent)	46,942	29.8%
Republican	Ari Daniel Bradshaw	46,810	29.72%
Independent	Tom Simes	15,946	10.12%
Total votes		157,508	100%
Democratic hold			
Republican hold			

=== District 3 ===
Primary election results
Party	Candidate	Votes	%
Republican Party primary results
Republican	Joseph Chaplik (incumbent)	37,876	53.92%
Republican	Alexander Kolodin (incumbent)	32,368	46.08%
Total votes		70,244	100%
Democratic Party primary results
Democratic	Richard Corles	18,040	100%
Total votes		18,040	100%

General election results
Party	Candidate	Votes	%
Republican	Joseph Chaplik (incumbent)	93,596	39.38%
Republican	Alexander Kolodin (incumbent)	88,693	37.32%
Democratic	Richard Corles	55,372	23.3%
Total votes		237,661	100%
Republican hold			
Republican hold			

=== District 4 ===
Primary election results
Party	Candidate	Votes	%
Republican Party primary results
Republican	Matt Gress (incumbent)	24,366	55.60%
Republican	Pamela Carter	19,454	44.40%
Total votes		43,820	100%
Democratic Party primary results
Democratic	Kelli Butler	20,949	52.50%
Democratic	Karen Gresham	18,956	47.50%
Total votes		39,905	100%

General election results
Party	Candidate	Votes	%
Republican	Matt Gress (incumbent)	75,669	27.5%
Republican	Pamela Carter	69,077	25.1%
Democratic	Kelli Butler	66,407	24.13%
Democratic	Karen Gresham	64,038	23.27%
Total votes		275,191	100%
Republican hold			
Republican gain from Democratic			

=== District 5 ===
Primary election results
Party	Candidate	Votes	%
Democratic Party primary results
Democratic	Sarah Liguori (incumbent)	17,215	42.05%
Democratic	Aaron Márquez	11,334	27.68%
Democratic	Charles Lucking (incumbent)	8,342	20.38%
Democratic	Dorri Thyden	4,051	9.89%
Total votes		40,942	100%
Republican Party primary results
Republican	Reina "Reina" Patocs (write-in)	1,450	92.59%
Republican	Juan Schoville (write-in) (Note: Despite coming in second place in the Republican primary, Juan Schoville did not advance to the general election.)	116	7.41%
Total votes		1,566	100%

General election results
Party	Candidate	Votes	%
Democratic	Sarah Liguori (incumbent)	61,889	40.5%
Democratic	Aaron Márquez	59,087	38.7%
Republican	Reina "Reina" Patocs	31,601	20.7%
Republican	Arthur Gonzales Sr. (write-in)	88	0.1%
Total votes		152,665	100%
Democratic hold			
Democratic hold			

=== District 6 ===
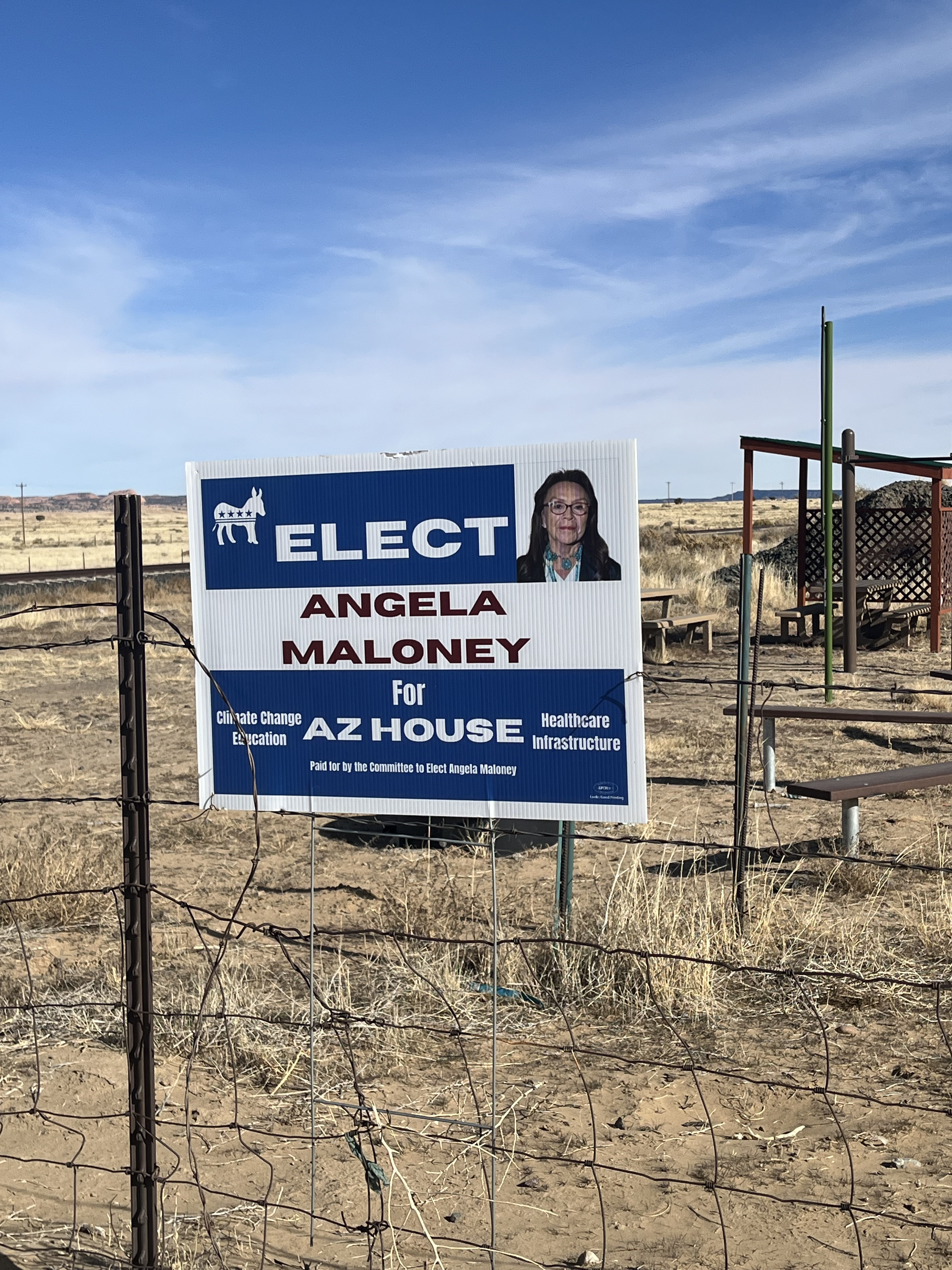
Sign outside Kayenta, Arizona for Angela Maloney's campaign

Primary election results
Party	Candidate	Votes	%
Democratic Party primary results
Democratic	Myron Tsosie (incumbent)	15,958	40.24%
Democratic	Mae Peshlakai (incumbent)	15,537	39.17%
Democratic	Angela Maloney	8,166	20.59%
Total votes		39,661	100%
Republican Party primary results
Republican	Rich King	7,291	50.11%
Republican	Lloyd Johnson	7,259	49.89%
Total votes		14,550	100%

General election results
Party	Candidate	Votes	%
Democratic	Myron Tsosie (incumbent)	47,088	34.6%
Democratic	Mae Peshlakai (incumbent)	45,397	33.6%
Republican	Rich King	21,425	15.8%
Republican	Lloyd Johnson	21,381	15.8%
Total votes		135,291	100%
Democratic hold			
Democratic hold			

=== District 7 ===
Primary election results
Party	Candidate	Votes	%
Republican Party primary results
Republican	Walter Blackman	18,058	27.43%
Republican	David Marshall (incumbent)	16,333	24.81%
Republican	Steven Slaton	9,292	14.12%
Republican	Andrew Costanzo	8,579	13.03%
Republican	John Fillmore	8,571	13.02%
Republican	Barby Ingle	4,992	7.58%
Total votes		65,825	100%
Democratic Party primary results
Democratic	Nancy Hartl	12,871	55.28%
Democratic	Kevin Chiquete	10,412	44.72%
Total votes		23,283	100%

General election results
Party	Candidate	Votes	%
Republican	Walter Blackman	64,591	32.7%
Republican	David Marshall (incumbent)	63,900	32.3%
Democratic	Nancy Hartl	35,972	18.2%
Democratic	Kevin Chiquete	33,120	16.8%
Total votes		197,583	100%
Republican hold			
Republican hold			

=== District 8 ===
Primary election results
Party	Candidate	Votes	%
Democratic Party primary results
Democratic	Brian Garcia	9,078	34.33%
Democratic	Janeen Connolly	8,856	33.49%
Democratic	Juan Mendez	8,510	32.18%
Total votes		26,444	100%
Republican Party primary results
Republican	Caden Darrow	9,281	100%
Total votes		9,281	100%
Green Party primary results
Green	Tre Rook (write-in)	7	100%
Total votes		7	100%

General election results
Party	Candidate	Votes	%
Democratic	Janeen Connolly	37,629	35%
Democratic	Brian Garcia	36,770	34.2%
Republican	Caden Darrow	27,415	25.5%
Green	Tre Rook	5,597	5.2%
Total votes		107,411	100%
Democratic hold			
Democratic hold			

=== District 9 ===
Primary election results
Party	Candidate	Votes	%
Democratic Party primary results
Democratic	Lorena Austin (incumbent)	10,353	54.22%
Democratic	Seth Blattman (incumbent)	8,741	45.78%
Total votes		19,094	100%
Republican Party primary results
Republican	Mary Ann Mendoza	10,429	50.71%
Republican	Kylie Barber	10,136	49.29%
Total votes		20,565	100%

General election results
Party	Candidate	Votes	%
Democratic	Lorena Austin (incumbent)	39,041	26.5%
Democratic	Seth Blattman (incumbent)	36,823	25%
Republican	Kylie Barber	35,895	24.4%
Republican	Mary Ann Mendoza	35,553	24.1%
Total votes		147,312	100%
Democratic hold			
Democratic hold			

=== District 10 ===
Primary election results
Party	Candidate	Votes	%
Republican Party primary results
Republican	Justin Olson	17,746	38.50%
Republican	Ralph Heap	16,335	35.44%
Republican	Matt Greer	12,016	26.07%
Total votes		46,097	100%
Democratic Party primary results
Democratic	Helen Hunter	13,477	96.04%
Democratic	Stephanie Simmons (write-in)	555	3.96%
Total votes		14,032	100%

General election results
Party	Candidate	Votes	%
Republican	Justin Olson	50,945	30.7%
Republican	Ralph Heap	49,683	29.9%
Democratic	Helen Hunter	32,693	19.7%
Democratic	Stephanie Simmons	32,668	19.7%
Total votes		165,989	100%
Republican hold			
Republican hold			

=== District 11 ===
- Michael Butts was removed from the Democratic primary ballot. (Note: Michael Butts (D) was removed from the primary ballot after being disqualified as a candidate.)

Primary election results
Party	Candidate	Votes	%
Democratic Party primary results
Democratic	Oscar De Los Santos (incumbent)	11,592	47.00%
Democratic	Junelle Cavero (incumbent)	8,922	36.18%
Democratic	Izaak Ruiz	4,148	16.82%
Total votes		24,662	100%
Republican Party primary results
Republican	Joseph Charles Dailey	3,886	54.40%
Republican	Cesar Ivan Aleman	3,257	45.60%
Total votes		7,143	100%

General election results
Party	Candidate	Votes	%
Democratic	Oscar De Los Santos (incumbent)	28,898	37.3%
Democratic	Junelle Cavero (incumbent)	26,850	34.7%
Republican	Joseph Charles Dailey	10,858	14%
Republican	Cesar Ivan Aleman	10,787	13.9%
Total votes		77,393	100%
Democratic hold			
Democratic hold			

=== District 12 ===
Primary election results
Party	Candidate	Votes	%
Democratic Party primary results
Democratic	Patty Contreras (incumbent)	18,996	51.72%
Democratic	Stacey Travers (incumbent)	17,734	48.28%
Total votes		36,730	100%
Republican Party primary results
Republican	Lawrence Hudson	16,793	100%
Total votes		16,793	100%

General election results
Party	Candidate	Votes	%
Democratic	Patty Contreras (incumbent)	65,931	36.41%
Democratic	Stacey Travers (incumbent)	65,115	35.96%
Republican	Lawrence Hudson	49,932	27.57%
Libertarian	Marc Johnston (write-in)	89	0.05%
Independent	Benjamin Wirtz (write-in)	35	0.02%
Total votes		181,102	100%
Democratic hold			
Democratic hold			

=== District 13 ===
- Shante Saulsberry withdrew from the Democratic primary.

Primary election results
Party	Candidate	Votes	%
Republican Party primary results
Republican	Jeff Weninger	19,642	51.01%
Republican	Julie Willoughby (incumbent)	18,867	48.99%
Total votes		38,509	100%
Democratic Party primary results
Democratic	Brandy Reese	13,986	50.63%
Democratic	Nicholas Gonzales	13,638	49.37%
Total votes		27,624	100%
Green Party primary results
Green	Cody Hannah (write-in)	5	100%
Total votes		5	100%

General election results
Party	Candidate	Votes	%
Republican	Jeff Weninger	57,486	25.9%
Republican	Julie Willoughby (incumbent)	56,914	25.7%
Democratic	Brandy Reese	52,677	23.8%
Democratic	Nicholas Gonzales	51,133	23.1%
Green	Cody Hannah	3,361	1.5%
Total votes		221,571	100%
Republican gain from Democratic			
Republican hold			

=== District 14 ===
Primary election results
Party	Candidate	Votes	%
Republican Party primary results
Republican	Laurin Hendrix (incumbent)	13,611	26.95%
Republican	Khyl Powell	11,998	23.75%
Republican	Andrew Jackson	10,539	20.87%
Republican	Lalani Hunsaker	9,324	18.46%
Republican	Joel Coen	5,038	9.97%
Total votes		50,510	100%
Democratic Party primary results
Democratic	Kristin Clark (write-in) (Note: Despite coming in first place in the Democratic primary, Kristin Clark did not advance to the general election.)	356	100%
Total votes		356	100%
Green Party primary results
Green	Scott Menor (write-in)	3	100%
Total votes		3	100%

General election results
Party	Candidate	Votes	%
Republican	Laurin Hendrix (incumbent)	47,531	43.2%
Republican	Khyl Powell	44,185	40.1%
Green	Scott Menor	18,355	16.7%
Total votes		110,071	100%
Republican hold			
Republican hold			

=== District 15 ===
Primary election results
Party	Candidate	Votes	%
Republican Party primary results
Republican	Neal Carter (incumbent)	18,190	34.95%
Republican	Michael Way	15,097	29.01%
Republican	Peter Anello	9,656	18.55%
Republican	Alex Stovall	9,100	17.49%
Total votes		52,043	100%
Democratic Party primary results
Democratic	Barbara Beneitone	10,937	100%
Total votes		10,937	100%

General election results
Party	Candidate	Votes	%
Republican	Michael Way	62,269	39.3%
Republican	Neal Carter (incumbent)	59,460	37.5%
Democratic	Barbara Beneitone	36,837	23.2%
Total votes		158,566	100%
Republican hold			
Republican hold			

=== District 16 ===
Primary election results
Party	Candidate	Votes	%
Democratic Party primary results
Democratic	Keith Seaman (incumbent)	14,087	100%
Total votes		14,087	100%
Republican Party primary results
Republican	Teresa Martinez (incumbent)	11,180	30.49%
Republican	Chris Lopez	9,962	27.16%
Republican	Rob Hudelson	9,746	26.58%
Republican	Gabriela Saucedo Mercer	5,785	15.77%
Total votes		36,673	100%

General election results
Party	Candidate	Votes	%
Republican	Teresa Martinez (incumbent)	53,741	36.3%
Republican	Chris Lopez	49,050	33.1%
Democratic	Keith Seaman (incumbent)	45,373	30.6%
Total votes		148,164	100%
Republican hold			
Republican gain from Democratic			

=== District 17 ===
Primary election results
Party	Candidate	Votes	%
Republican Party primary results
Republican	Cory McGarr (incumbent)	24,583	41.20%
Republican	Rachel Jones (incumbent)	19,005	31.85%
Republican	Anna Orth	16,073	26.94%
Total votes		59,661	100%
Democratic Party primary results
Democratic	Kevin Volk	26,330	100%
Total votes		26,330	100%

General election results
Party	Candidate	Votes	%
Democratic	Kevin Volk	73,985	34.5%
Republican	Rachel Jones (incumbent)	71,620	33.4%
Republican	Cory McGarr (incumbent)	68,904	32.1%
Total votes		214,509	100%
Democratic gain from Republican			
Republican hold			

=== District 18 ===
Primary election results
Party	Candidate	Votes	%
Democratic Party primary results
Democratic	Nancy Gutierrez (incumbent)	27,718	52.72%
Democratic	Christopher Mathis (incumbent)	24,856	47.28%
Total votes		52,574	100%
Republican Party primary results
Republican	Leonard "Len" Rosenblum	16,297	100%
Total votes		16,297	100%

General election results
Party	Candidate	Votes	%
Democratic	Nancy Gutierrez (incumbent)	57,212	38.9%
Democratic	Christopher Mathis (incumbent)	53,895	36.6%
Republican	Leonard "Len" Rosenblum	36,016	24.5%
Total votes		147,123	100%
Democratic hold			
Democratic hold			

=== District 19 ===
Primary election results
Party	Candidate	Votes	%
Republican Party primary results
Republican	Gail Griffin (incumbent)	27,154	55.99%
Republican	Lupe Diaz (incumbent)	21,348	44.01%
Total votes		48,502	100%
Democratic Party primary results
Democratic	Gregg Frostrom Jr.	16,616	100%
Total votes		16,616	100%

General election results
Party	Candidate	Votes	%
Republican	Gail Griffin (incumbent)	40,577	39.8%
Republican	Lupe Diaz (incumbent)	36,431	35.7%
Democratic	Gregg Frostrom Jr.	24,958	24.5%
Total votes		101,966	100%
Republican hold			
Republican hold			

=== District 20 ===
Primary election results
Party	Candidate	Votes	%
Democratic Party primary results
Democratic	Betty Villegas (incumbent)	16,710	50.16%
Democratic	Alma Hernandez (incumbent)	16,604	49.84%
Total votes		33,314	100%

General election results
Party	Candidate	Votes	%
Democratic	Alma Hernandez (incumbent)	38,870	51.7%
Democratic	Betty Villegas (incumbent)	36,338	48.3%
Total votes		75,208	100%
Democratic hold			
Democratic hold			

=== District 21 ===
Primary election results
Party	Candidate	Votes	%
Democratic Party primary results
Democratic	Consuelo Hernandez (incumbent)	13,745	43.38%
Democratic	Stephanie Stahl Hamilton (incumbent)	9,218	29.09%
Democratic	Briana "Breezy" Ortega	8,723	27.53%
Total votes		31,686	100%
Republican Party primary results
Republican	Christopher Kibbey	8,746	100%
Total votes		8,746	100%

General election results
Party	Candidate	Votes	%
Democratic	Consuelo Hernandez (incumbent)	35,995	39%
Democratic	Stephanie Stahl Hamilton (incumbent)	31,928	34%
Republican	Christopher Kibbey	24,339	26.4%
Total votes		92,262	100%
Democratic hold			
Democratic hold			

=== District 22 ===
Primary election results
Party	Candidate	Votes	%
Democratic Party primary results
Democratic	Lupe Chavira Contreras (incumbent)	7,053	40.85%
Democratic	Elda Luna-Nájera (incumbent)	4,207	24.37%
Democratic	Betsy Munoz	3,887	22.52%
Democratic	Jen Wynne	2,117	12.26%
Total votes		17,264	100%
Republican Party primary results
Republican	Blaine "BJ" Griffin Sr.	4,226	51.67%
Republican	Diana Jones	3,953	48.33%
Total votes		8,179	100%

General election results
Party	Candidate	Votes	%
Democratic	Lupe Contreras (incumbent)	27,692	33.5%
Democratic	Elda Luna-Nájera (incumbent)	24,502	29.7%
Republican	Diana Jones	15,405	18.6%
Republican	Blaine "BJ" Griffin Sr.	15,020	18.2%
Total votes		82,619	100%
Democratic hold			
Democratic hold			

=== District 23 ===
Primary election results
Party	Candidate	Votes	%
Democratic Party primary results
Democratic	Mariana Sandoval (incumbent)	9,194	48.58%
Democratic	Matias Rosales	6,811	35.99%
Democratic	James "Jimmy" Holmes	2,919	15.42%
Total votes		18,924	100%
Republican Party primary results
Republican	Michele Peña (incumbent)	9,597	100%
Total votes		9,597	100%

General election results
Party	Candidate	Votes	%
Republican	Michele Peña (incumbent)	37,967	34.2%
Democratic	Mariana Sandoval (incumbent)	37,375	33.6%
Democratic	Matias Rosales	35,788	32.2%
Total votes		111,130	100%
Republican hold			
Democratic hold			

=== District 24 ===
Primary election results
Party	Candidate	Votes	%
Democratic Party primary results
Democratic	Lydia Hernandez (incumbent)	6,014	38.61%
Democratic	Anna Abeytia	5,075	32.58%
Democratic	Héctor Jaramillo	4,486	28.80%
Total votes		15,575	100%

General election results
Party	Candidate	Votes	%
Democratic	Lydia Hernandez (incumbent)	23,041	54%
Democratic	Anna Abeytia	19,654	46%
Total votes		42,695	100%
Democratic hold			
Democratic hold			

=== District 25 ===
- Nathan Madden withdrew from the Libertarian primary.

Primary election results
Party	Candidate	Votes	%
Republican Party primary results
Republican	Michael Carbone (incumbent)	16,166	36.98%
Republican	Nick Kupper	12,249	28.02%
Republican	Gary Garcia Snyder	9,050	20.70%
Republican	Steve Markegard	6,256	14.31%
Total votes		43,721	100%
Democratic Party primary results
Democratic	William "Bill" Peter Olear	10,258	100%
Total votes		10,258	100%

General election results
Party	Candidate	Votes	%
Republican	Michael Carbone (incumbent)	47,441	39.4%
Republican	Nick Kupper	44,316	36.8%
Democratic	William "Bill" Peter Olear	28,628	23.8%
Total votes		120,385	100%
Republican hold			
Republican hold			

=== District 26 ===
Primary election results
Party	Candidate	Votes	%
Democratic Party primary results
Democratic	Cesar Aguilar (incumbent)	7,848	57.15%
Democratic	Quantá Crews (incumbent)	5,885	42.85%
Total votes		13,733	100%
Republican Party primary results
Republican	Frank Roberts	3,721	54.07%
Republican	Skyla Edwards	3,161	45.93%
Total votes		6,882	100%

General election results
Party	Candidate	Votes	%
Democratic	Cesar Aguilar (incumbent)	18,400	35.5%
Democratic	Quantá Crews (incumbent)	15,804	30.5%
Republican	Frank Roberts	9,135	17.6%
Republican	Skyla Edwards	8,559	16.5%
Total votes		51,898	100%
Democratic hold			
Democratic hold			

=== District 27 ===
Primary election results
Party	Candidate	Votes	%
Republican Party primary results
Republican	Lisa Fink	12,739	33.50%
Republican	Tony Rivero	10,512	27.64%
Republican	Brian Morris	9,474	24.91%
Republican	Linda Busam	5,303	13.94%
Total votes		38,028	100%
Democratic Party primary results
Democratic	Deborah Howard	12,629	100%
Total votes		12,629	100%

General election results
Party	Candidate	Votes	%
Republican	Lisa Fink	50,758	34.8%
Republican	Tony Rivero	50,265	34.4%
Democratic	Deborah Howard	45,023	30.8%
Total votes		146,046	100%
Republican hold			
Republican hold			

=== District 28 ===
Primary election results
Party	Candidate	Votes	%
Republican Party primary results
Republican	David Livingston (incumbent)	26,914	36.97%
Republican	Beverly Pingerelli (incumbent)	26,707	36.69%
Republican	Susan Black	19,170	26.34%
Total votes		72,791	100%
Democratic Party primary results
Democratic	Barbara Jean Fike	18,880	100%
Total votes		18,880	100%

General election results
Party	Candidate	Votes	%
Republican	Beverly Pingerelli (incumbent)	64,058	37.4%
Republican	David Livingston (incumbent)	63,559	37.1%
Democratic	Barbara Jean Fike	43,482	25.4%
Total votes		171,099	100%
Republican hold			
Republican hold			

=== District 29 ===
- Austin Smith (incumbent) withdrew from the Republican primary.

Primary election results
Party	Candidate	Votes	%
Republican Party primary results
Republican	Steve Montenegro (incumbent)	22,153	54.54%
Republican	James Taylor	18,382	45.25%
Republican	Amy Heusted (write-in)	85	0.21%
Total votes		40,620	100%
Democratic Party primary results
Democratic	Tanairí Ochoa-Martínez	12,373	54.56%
Democratic	Tom Tzitzura	10,304	45.44%
Total votes		22,677	100%

General election results
Party	Candidate	Votes	%
Republican	Steve Montenegro (incumbent)	50,865	30.2%
Republican	James Taylor	50,417	29.9%
Democratic	Tanairí Ochoa-Martínez	34,278	20.3%
Democratic	Tom Tzitzura	32,964	19.6%
Total votes		32,964	100%
Republican hold			
Republican hold			

=== District 30 ===
Primary election results
Party	Candidate	Votes	%
Republican Party primary results
Republican	Leo Biasiucci (incumbent)	30,944	53.10%
Republican	John Gillette (incumbent)	27,334	46.90%
Total votes		58,278	100%
Democratic Party primary results
Democratic	Monica Timberlake	7,971	100%
Total votes		7,971	100%

General election results
Party	Candidate	Votes	%
Republican	Leo Biasiucci (incumbent)	63,100	42.9%
Republican	John Gillette (incumbent)	62,316	42.4%
Democratic	Monica Timberlake	21,562	14.7%
Total votes		146,978	100%
Republican hold			
Republican hold			

== See also ==
- 2024 Arizona elections
  - 2024 Arizona Senate election
