= Michael Way =

Michael Way may refer to:

- Mikey Way, American musician and songwriter
- Michael Way (politician), American businessman and member of the Arizona House of Representatives
