= Lupe Diaz =

American politician and pastor

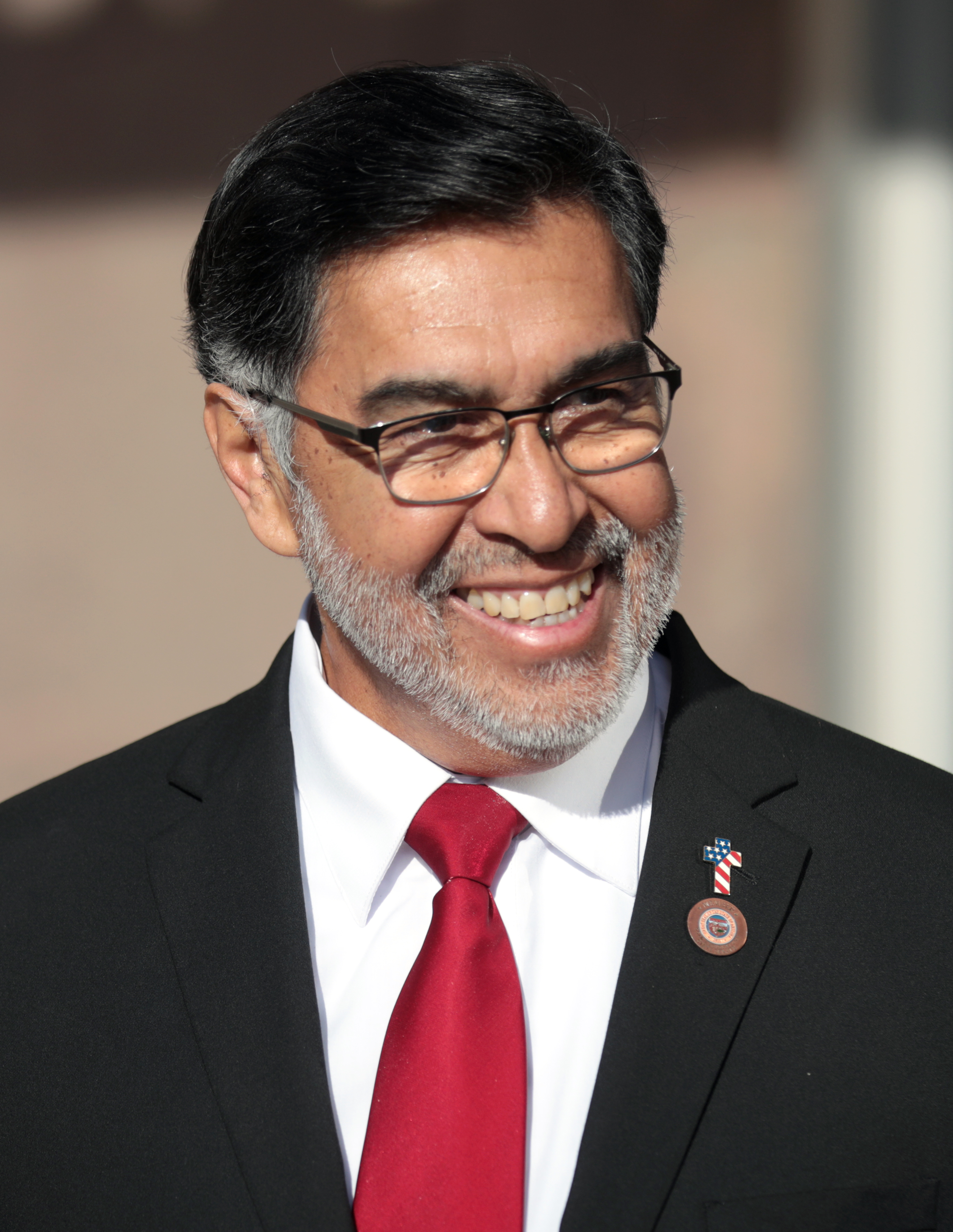
- Diaz in 2023

Member of the Arizona House of Representatives from the 19th district
- Incumbent
- Assumed office January 9, 2023 Serving with Gail Griffin
- Preceded by: Diego Espinoza

Member of the Arizona House of Representatives from the 14th district
- In office November 23, 2021 – January 9, 2023
- Preceded by: Becky Nutt
- Succeeded by: Travis Grantham

Personal details
- Party: Republican
- Education: School of Bible Theology (BA)
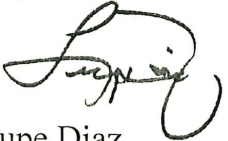
- Signature

Lupe Diaz is an American politician and pastor serving as a member of the Arizona House of Representatives from the 19th district. He assumed office on November 23, 2021.

== Early life and education ==
A native of Bisbee, Arizona, Diaz graduated from Bisbee High School. He earned a Bachelor of Arts degree in theological studies from the School of Bible Theology in San Jacinto, California.

== Career ==
Since 1988, Diaz has worked as a pastor at Grace Chapel Benson in Benson, Arizona. He also served as a member of the Benson City Council. Diaz is also the president of Grace Christian Center Inc., a non-profit organization. He is also the principal of Grace Christian Academy. Diaz was appointed to the Arizona House of Representatives by the Cochise County Board of Supervisors in November 2021, succeeding Becky Nutt.
