= Elda Luna-Nájera =

American social worker and politician

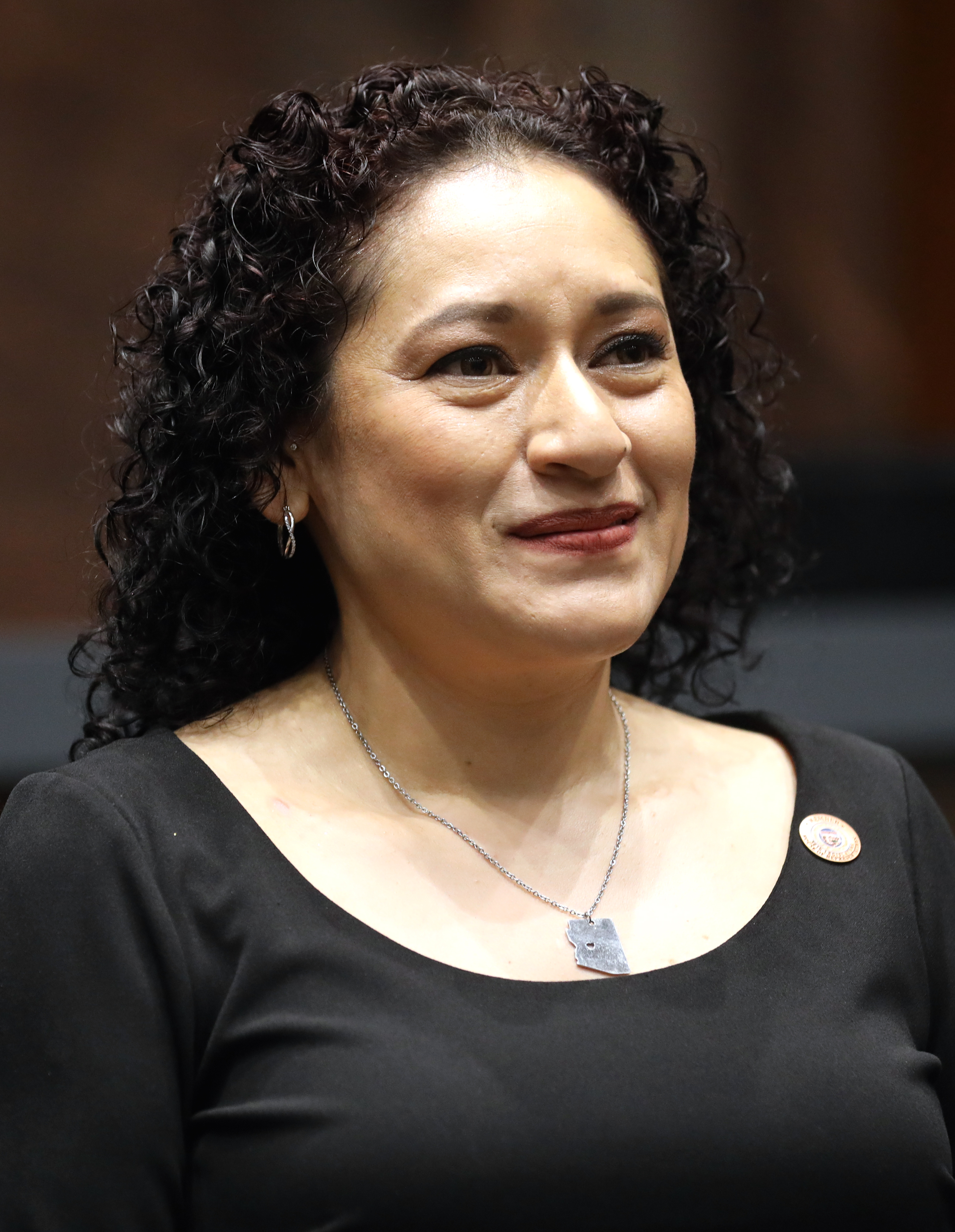

Member of the Arizona House of Representatives from the 22nd district
- Incumbent
- Assumed office March 1, 2024 Serving with Lupe Contreras
- Preceded by: Leezah Sun

Personal details
- Born: Arizona, U.S.
- Party: Democratic
- Education: Arizona State University; University of Southern California

Elda Luna-Nájera is an American social worker and politician serving as a member of the Arizona House of Representatives from the 22nd district since 2024.

== Life ==
Luna-Nájera earned a master's in social work from the Arizona State University West campus. She completed a doctorate in social work from the University of Southern California.

In July 2016, Luna-Nájera joined the Agua Fria Union High School District where she manages social programs including mental health and foster care. She joined the governing board of the Tolleson Union High School District in September 2020. By 2024, she was serving as its president.

In February 2024, Luna-Nájera was selected by the Maricopa County Board of Supervisors to succeeded Leezah Sun as a member of the Arizona House of Representatives from the 22nd district. A member of the Democratic Party, she intends to run for reelection in the 2024 Arizona House of Representatives election.

At a Tolleson Union High School District board meeting in August 2024, superintendent Jeremy Calles accused board president Luna-Najera of sexual harassment and claimed the board was retaliating by considering his termination. After a closed session, no action was taken. The board acknowledged an ongoing investigation but withheld further comments.
