= Lisa Fink =

American politician

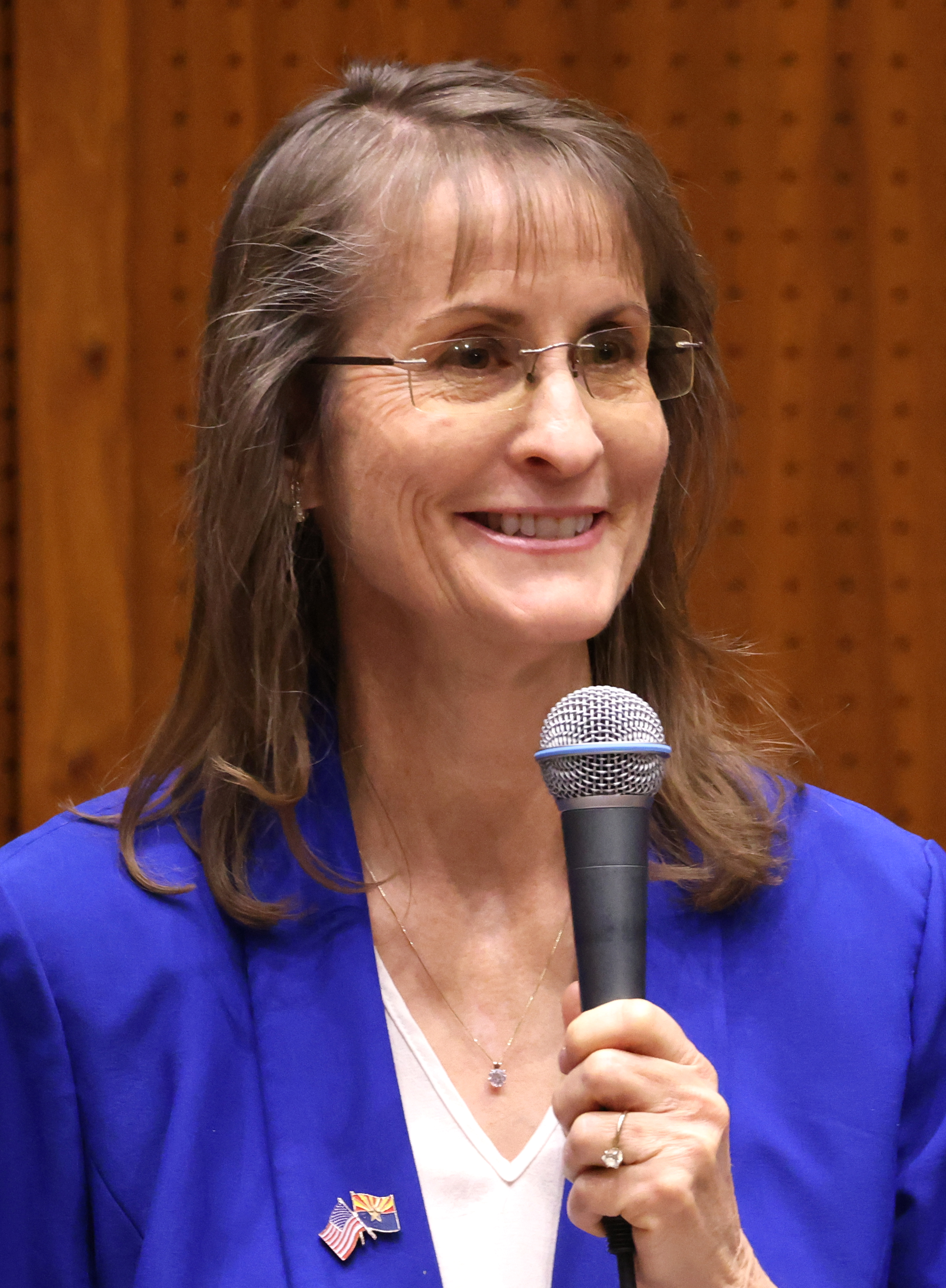
- Fink in 2025

Member of the Arizona House of Representatives from the 27th district
- Incumbent
- Assumed office January 13, 2025 Serving with Tony Rivero
- Preceded by: Kevin Payne

Personal details
- Party: Republican

Lisa Fink is an American parental rights activist and politician serving as a member of the Arizona House of Representatives for the 27th district since 2025. A Republican, she was elected in 2024 to succeed Kevin Payne.
