= Arizona's 25th legislative district =

American legislative district

- Map of District 25: Approved January 21, 2022
- Senator: Tim Dunn (R)
- House members: Nick Kupper (R); Michael Carbone (R)
- Registration: 42.55% Republican; 21.14% Democratic; 34.59% Other
- Demographics: 53% White; 5% Black/African American; 2% Native American; 3% Asian; 36% Hispanic
- Population: 243,005
- Voting-age population: 181,727
- Registered voters: 143,080

Arizona's 25th legislative district is one of 30 in the state, consisting of sections of Maricopa County and Yuma County. As of 2023, there are 64 precincts in the district, 44 in Maricopa and 20 in Yuma, with a total registered voter population of 143,080. The district has an overall population of 243,005.

Following the 2020 United States redistricting cycle, the Arizona Independent Redistricting Commission (AIRC) redrew legislative district boundaries in Arizona. According to the AIRC, the district is outside of competitive range and considered leaning Republican.

== Political representation ==
The district is represented in the 56th Arizona State Legislature, which convenes from January 1, 2023, to December 31, 2024, by Sine Kerr (R-Buckeye) in the Arizona Senate and by Tim Dunn (R-Yuma) and Michael Carbone (R-Buckeye) in the Arizona House of Representatives.

Name	Image	Residence	Office	Party
Sine Kerr		Buckeye	State senator	Republican
Tim Dunn		Yuma	State representative	Republican
Michael Carbone		Buckeye	State representative	Republican

== Election results ==
The 2022 elections were the first in the newly drawn district.

=== Arizona Senate ===
2022 Arizona's 25th Senate district election
Party	Candidate	Votes	%
Republican	Sine Kerr (incumbent)	59,471	100
Total votes		59,471	100
Republican hold			

=== Arizona House of Representatives ===
2022 Arizona House of Representatives election, 25th district
Party	Candidate	Votes	%
Republican	Tim Dunn (incumbent)	50,099	51.95
Republican	Michael Carbone	46,341	48.05
Total votes		96,440	100.00
Republican hold			
Republican hold			

== See also ==
- List of Arizona legislative districts
- Arizona State Legislature
