= Frank Pratt (politician) =

American politician (1942–2021)

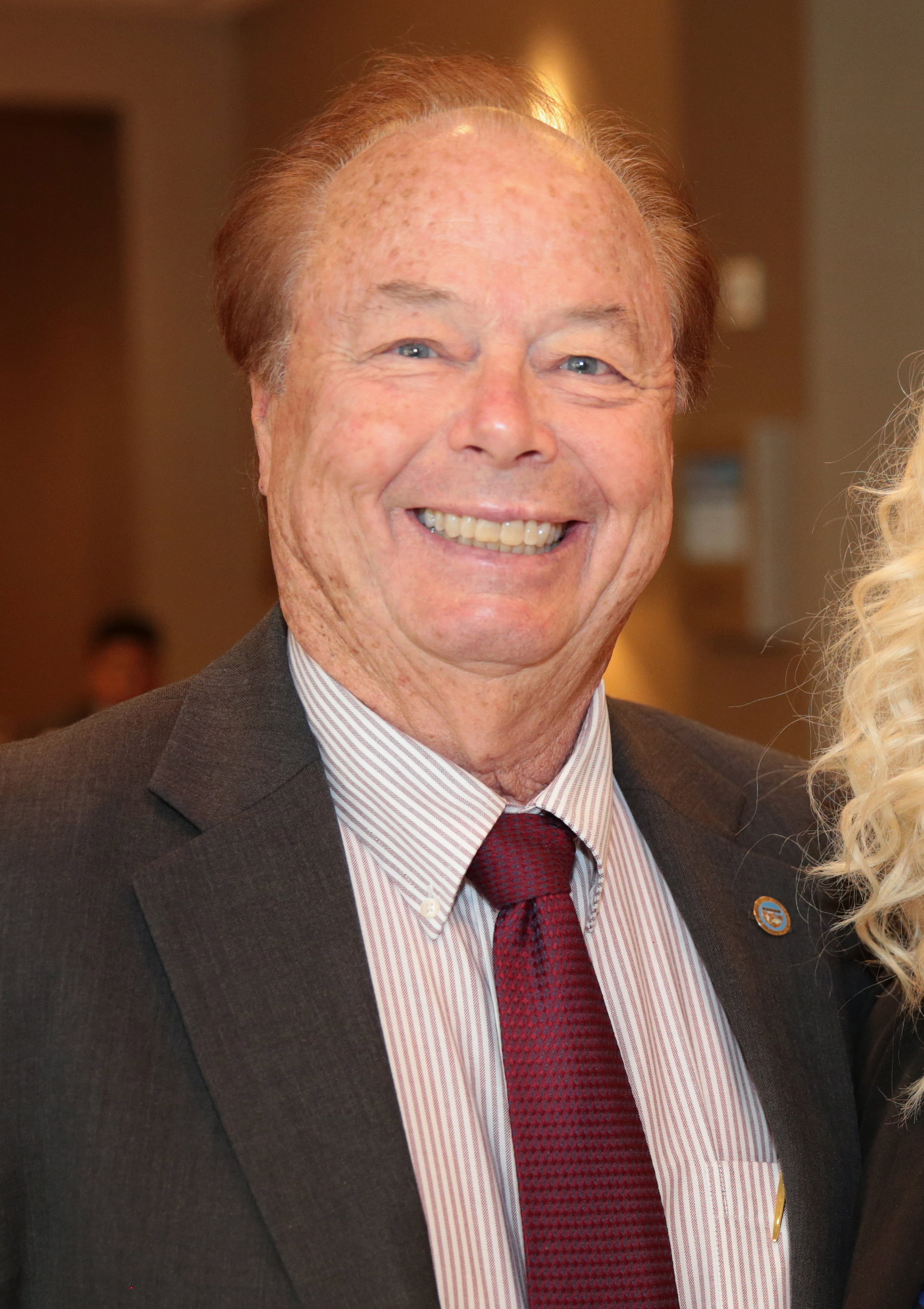
- Pratt in 2017

Member of the Arizona House of Representatives
- In office January 11, 2021 – September 21, 2021 Serving with David Cook
- Preceded by: T. J. Shope
- Succeeded by: Neal Carter
- Constituency: 8th district
- In office January 14, 2013 – January 9, 2017 Serving with Barbara McGuire (2009–2011); John Fillmore (2011–2013)
- Preceded by: Colette Rosati
- Succeeded by: John Kavanagh
- Constituency: 23rd district (2009–2013); 8th district (2013–2017)

Member of the Arizona Senate from the 8th district
- In office January 9, 2017 – January 11, 2021
- Preceded by: Barbara McGuire
- Succeeded by: T. J. Shope

Personal details
- Born: August 27, 1942 Florence, Arizona, U.S.
- Died: September 21, 2021 (aged 79)
- Party: Republican
- Education: Arizona Western College; Central Arizona College
- Website: pratt4az.com

Franklin M. Pratt (August 27, 1942 – September 21, 2021) was an American politician who served as a Republican member of the Arizona State Senate. He had previously been a member of the Arizona House of Representatives, representing District 8. Pratt served consecutively from January 2009 until January 14, 2013, in the District 23 seat.

== Political positions ==
Frank Pratt has an 80% lifetime conservative rating from the American Conservative Union and a 58% conservative rating from the Arizona Chapter of Americans for Prosperity; he has a 20% rating from Planned Parenthood, which supports legal abortion and he has a 100% rating from the conservative Center for Arizona Policy. He was one of nine Republicans in the state house to vote in favor of the Medicaid expansion in Arizona. Pratt voted to specify penalties for violating the partial-birth abortion ban and voted to ban non-physicians from performing abortions. On education, he voted to allow the open-carry of guns near school property and to reject the adoption of federal education standards; however, he was one of nine Republicans who voted with Democrats against expanding school vouchers for private schools. On immigration, he voted to create a virtual border and to expand immigration enforcement, but he also joined Democrats to vote against requiring that judges give harsher penalties to undocumented immigrants. He is sometimes considered to be a swing vote in the state legislature and according to a study pulled by the Arizona Center for Investigative Reporting, Pratt voted with a majority of his Democratic colleagues 52% of the time while still voting more often with his own party.

== Elections ==
- 2014 – Frank Pratt and T.J. Shope defeated Wayne Bachmann and Darla Dawald in the Republican primary. Pratt and Shope defeated Carmen Casillas in the general election, with Pratt receiving 19,458 votes.
- 2012 – Redistricted to District 8, and with incumbent Representatives John Kavanagh and Michelle Ugenti redistricted to District 23, Pratt ran in the August 28, 2012 Republican Primary and placed first with 7,944 votes; in the November 6, 2012 General election, Pratt took the first seat with 24,195 votes and fellow Republican nominee TJ Shope took the second seat ahead of former Democratic Representative Ernest Bustamante and Democratic nominee Emily Verdugo, who had sought a legislative seat in 2008 as a write-in candidate.
- 2004 – To challenge District 23 incumbent Democratic Representatives Ernest Bustamante and Cheryl Chase, Pratt ran unopposed in the September 7, 2004 Republican Primary, winning with 3,794 votes, but lost the four-way November 2, 2004 General election to Democratic nominee Pete Rios (who had supplanted Representative Bustamante in the Democratic Primary) and incumbent Democratic Representative Chase.
- 2006 – When incumbent Democratic Representative Cheryl Chase ran for Arizona Senate and left a District 23 seat open, Pratt ran in the September 12, 2006 Republican Primary, taking first place with 4,172 votes; but lost the four-way November 7, 2006 General election to incumbent Democratic Representative Pete Rios and Democratic nominee Barbara McGuire.
- 2008 – When incumbent Democratic Representative Pete Rios left the Legislature and left a District 23 seat open, Pratt ran in the September 2, 2008 Republican Primary, and placed first with 5,839 votes. In the three-way November 2, 2010 General election, incumbent Democratic Representative McGuire took the first seat and Pratt took the second seat with 36,804 votes ahead of fellow Republican nominee John Fillmore and incumbent Democratic Representative Bustamante.
- 2010 – Democratic Representative McGuire, former Democratic Representative Bustamante, Pratt, and Fillmore won their respective August 24, 2010 primaries, setting up a four-way rematch of their 2008 contest; in the four-way November 2, 2010 General election Pratt took the first seat with 32,303 votes and fellow Republican nominee John Fillmore took the second seat ahead of incumbent Democratic McGuire and former Democratic Representative Bustamante.
