= Junelle Cavero =

American politician

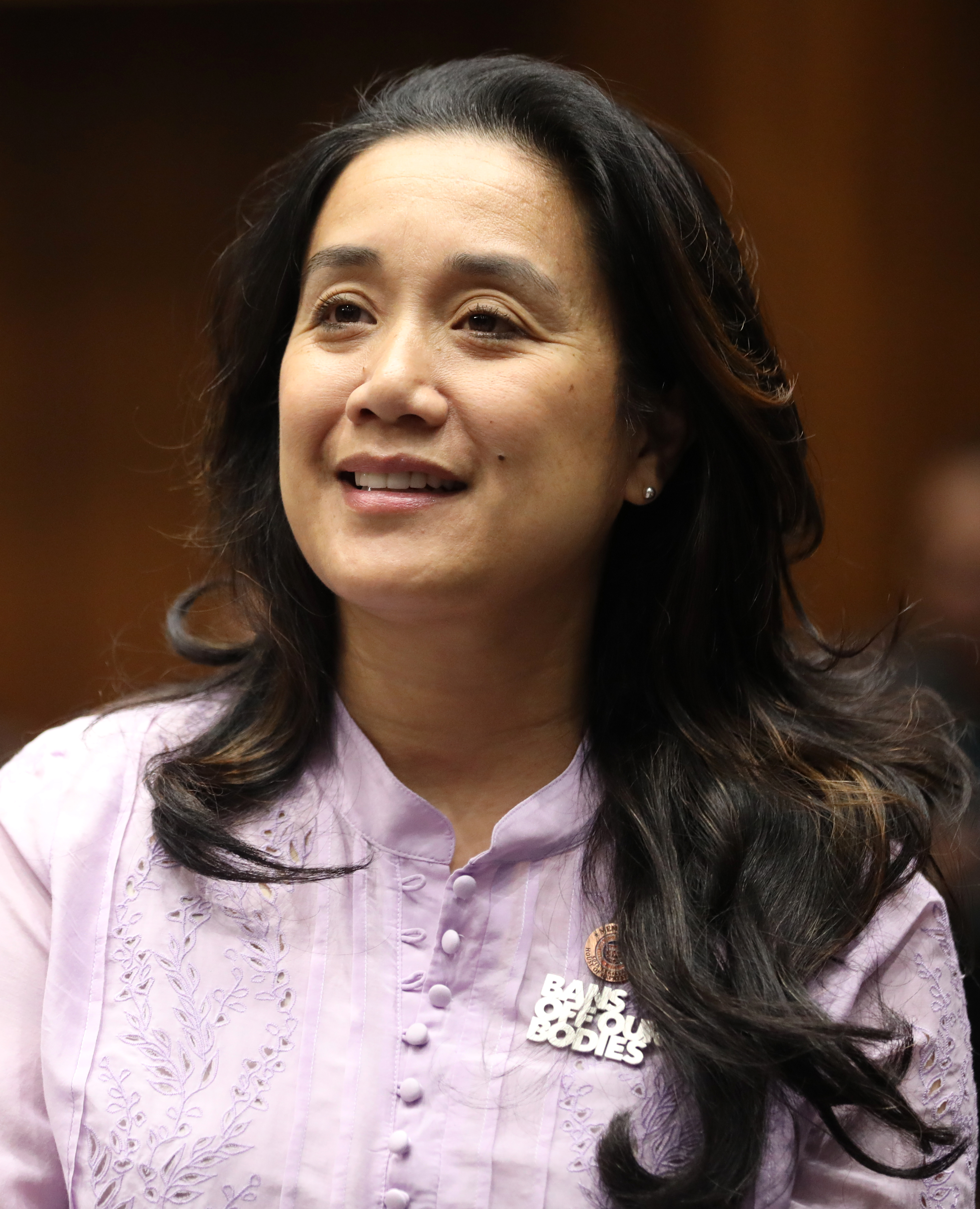
- Cavero in 2024

Member of the Arizona House of Representatives from the 11th district
- Incumbent
- Assumed office April 17, 2024 Serving with Oscar De Los Santos
- Preceded by: Marcelino Quiñonez

Personal details
- Party: Democratic
- Education: New York University (BA); American University (MPA)
- Website: Legislature website

Junelle Cavero Harnal is an American political consultant and politician serving as a member for the Arizona House of Representatives for the 11th district. On April 17, 2024, she was sworn in to the position after being appointed by the Maricopa County Board of Supervisors, replacing incumbent Representative Marcelino Quiñonez, who resigned from the position. She is of Filipino descent.

== Career ==
Cavero has worked as a political consultant on numerous Democratic campaigns, including for former congressional candidate Hiral Tiperneni. She served as a delegate for Arizona to the Democratic National Convention in 2016, casting her vote for Hillary Clinton.

Cavero previously ran for the Arizona State Senate in 2022, losing to former senator Catherine Miranda in the Democratic primary.

On April 16, 2024, she was announced by the Maricopa County Board of Supervisors to have been selected for appointment to the Arizona House of Representatives, and was sworn in the following day. Cavero replaced incumbent Marcelino Quiñonez, who resigned two weeks prior. She is running for a full term, having filed for the November election prior to being appointed.
