= Kyle Clayton =

American politician

Member-elect of the Arizona Senate from the 27th district
- Assuming office January 2027
- Succeeding: Kevin Payne

Personal details
- Party: Democratic

Kyle Clayton is an American politician. A member of the Democratic Party, he is the member-elect for the 27th district of the Arizona Senate.
