= Nick Kupper =

American politician

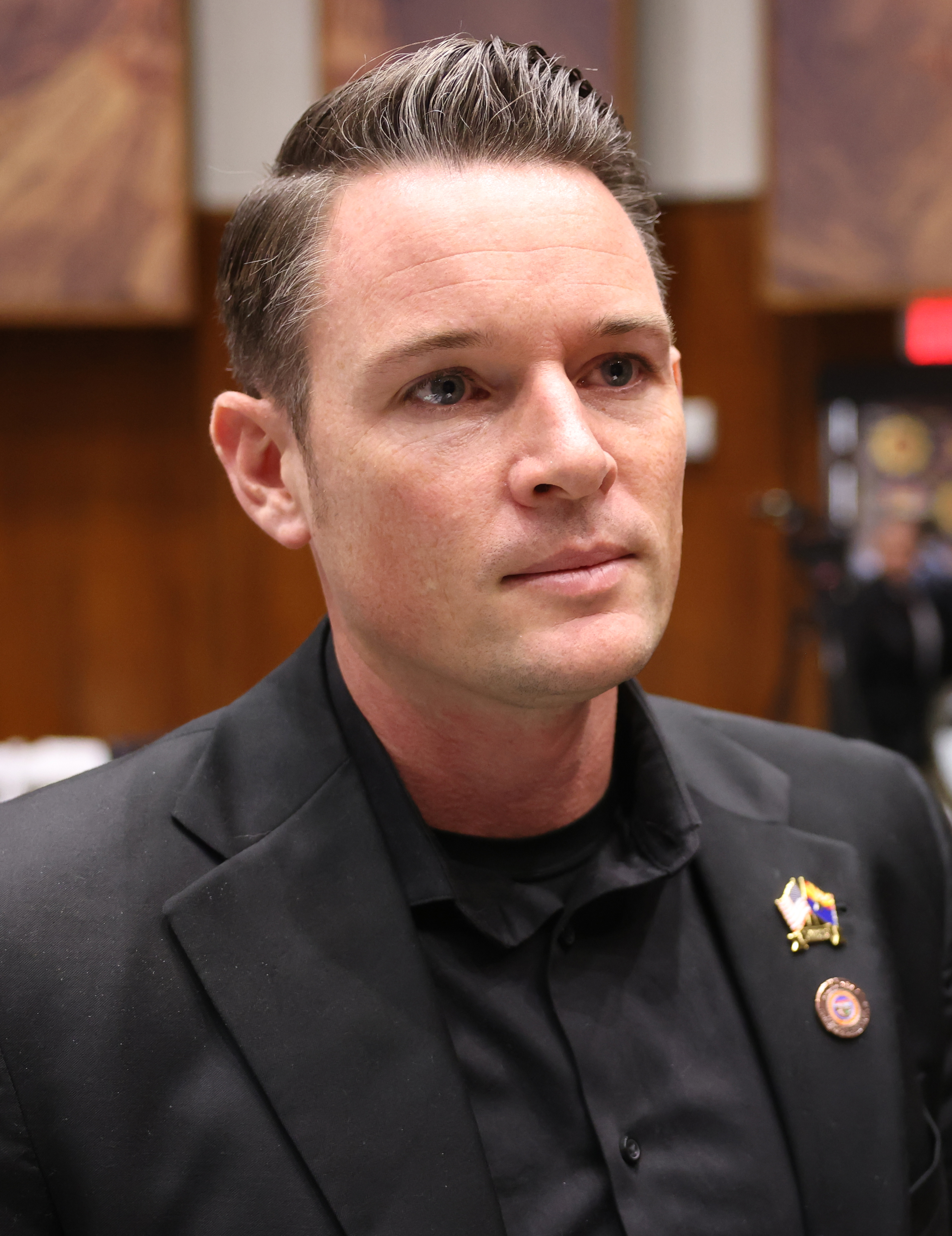
- Kupper in 2025

Member of the Arizona House of Representatives from the 25th district
- Incumbent
- Assumed office January 13, 2025 Serving with Michael Carbone
- Preceded by: Tim Dunn

Personal details
- Born: Nickolas Scott Kupper
- Party: Republican
- Spouse: Crystal Kupper

Nickolas Scott Kupper is an American politician. He serves as a Republican member for the 25th district of the Arizona House of Representatives.
