= Mae Peshlakai =

American politician and jeweller

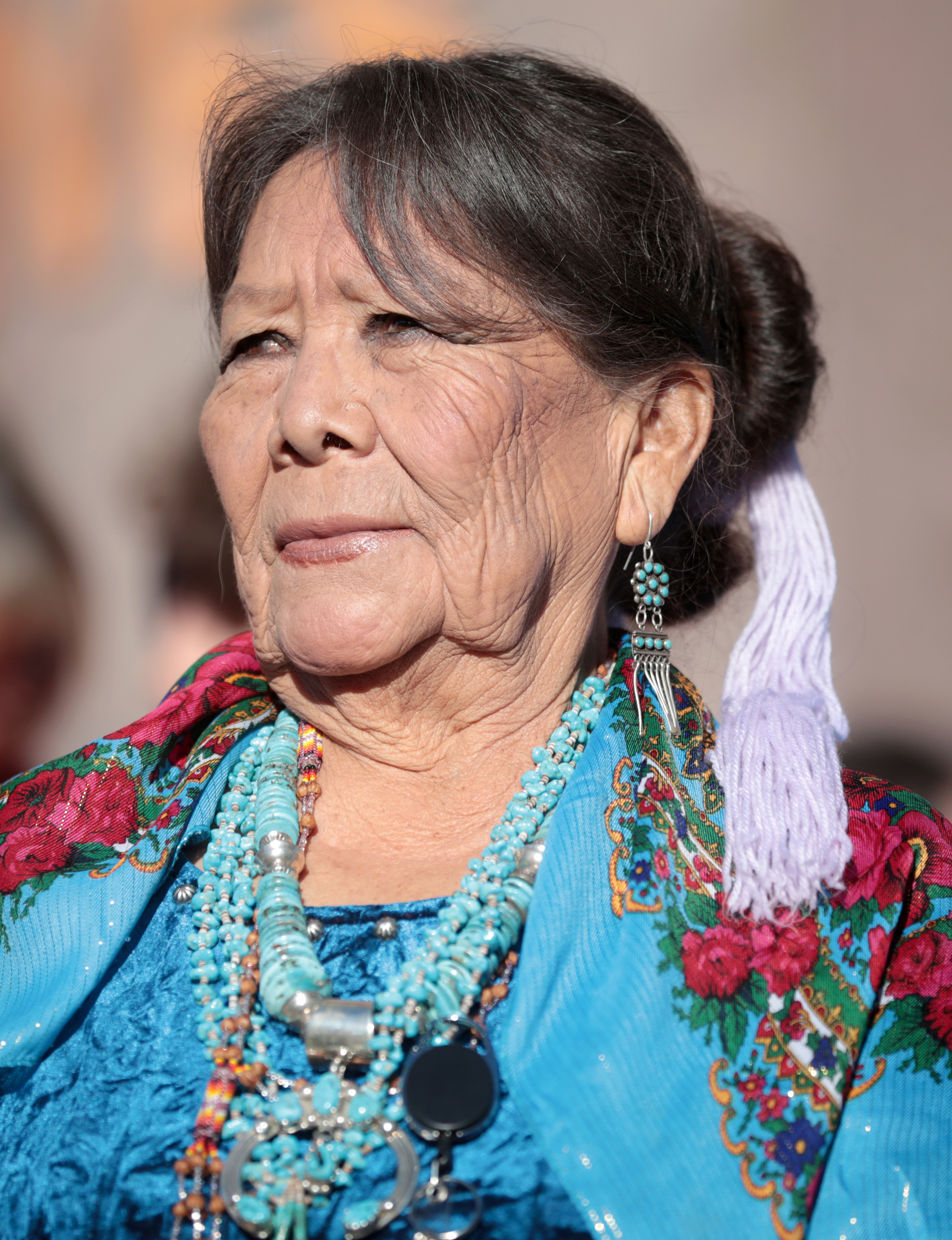
- Peshlakai in 2023

Member of the Arizona House of Representatives from the 6th district
- Incumbent
- Assumed office January 9, 2023 Serving with Myron Tsosie
- Preceded by: Brenda Barton

Personal details
- Born: Mae Walker
- Party: Democratic
- Children: 4; including Jamescita

Mae Walker Peshlakai is an American Navajo weaver, silversmith, and politician serving as a member of the Arizona House of Representatives since 2023. A Democrat, she represents Legislative District 6, which includes the Navajo Nation and the Hopi Tribe. Peshlakai co-founded a fine arts studio with her husband in the 1970s and has engaged in local politics in Cameron, Arizona, for nearly 30 years.

== Early life ==
Peshlakai grew up on the Navajo Nation and attended an American Indian boarding school. Her maiden name is Walker. Her mother, Dorothy Walker, and her sister, Angie Maloney, are also weavers. As of 1997, her sister worked as a district sanitarian in Tuba City, Arizona.

== Career ==
Peshlakai is a Navajo weaver, silversmith, and maker of jewelry and beadwork. She took up silversmithing after marrying her husband, James Peshlakai, who was a silversmith and goldsmith. In the early 1970s, she and James opened a fine arts studio in Flagstaff, Arizona, and traveled to nearly all 50 states to give art and cultural demonstrations. Their jewelry was purchased by notable figures including U.S. president Gerald Ford, The Beach Boys, and John Denver.

In 1971, Peshlakai met Arch Gould, a patron of Navajo weavers, at a weaving demonstration. In 1991, she and her sister taught a summer course at the University of Hawaiʻi Lab School and gave a demonstration at the Honolulu Academy of Art's Linekona Art Center. They have taught weaving in the Southwest, New England, and the Pacific Northwest. In November 1997, the sisters demonstrated weaving and discussed Navajo culture at Gettysburg College.

As of 1997, Peshlakai was the co-owner of Peshlakai's Consulting Service, Navajo Experience Catering Services, and was also a sheep and cattle rancher. She continued to own and manage her own small business as of 2023.

=== Politics ===
Peshlakai's involvement in politics began in the 1970s, when she and her husband campaigned for Coconino County Sheriff Joe Richards. She has been active in Cameron Chapter House politics for nearly 30 years.

In November 2022, Peshlakai was elected to the Arizona House of Representatives to represent the newly formed Legislative District 6. She and her Democratic running mate were unopposed by Republican candidates in the general election. As a legislator, she is a member of the Democratic Party from Cameron, Arizona. By December 2023, she was representing Legislative District 7, which includes the Navajo Nation, Hopi Tribe, and six other tribes. Her legislative priorities include education, health care, infrastructure, and veterans' issues. She serves on the military and public safety committees and is the chairwoman of the Indigenous People's Caucus.

== Personal life ==
Peshlakai is a Navajo elder who speaks both Navajo and English. She owns property in Cameron, Arizona, at the western edge of the Navajo Nation. As a traditional Navajo, she believes in the Beauty Way, the concept that Navajos are protectors of all living things.

She was married for over 50 years to James Peshlakai, an artist and storyteller who died on February 4, 2015. Peshlakai and her husband have four adult children, a son, Darcy, and three daughters, Jamescita, Stephanie, and Shalta. As of 2015, Peshlakai had 12 grandchildren and one great-grandchild.

== See also ==
- List of Native American politicians
- Native American women in politics
