= Michael Way (politician) =

American politician

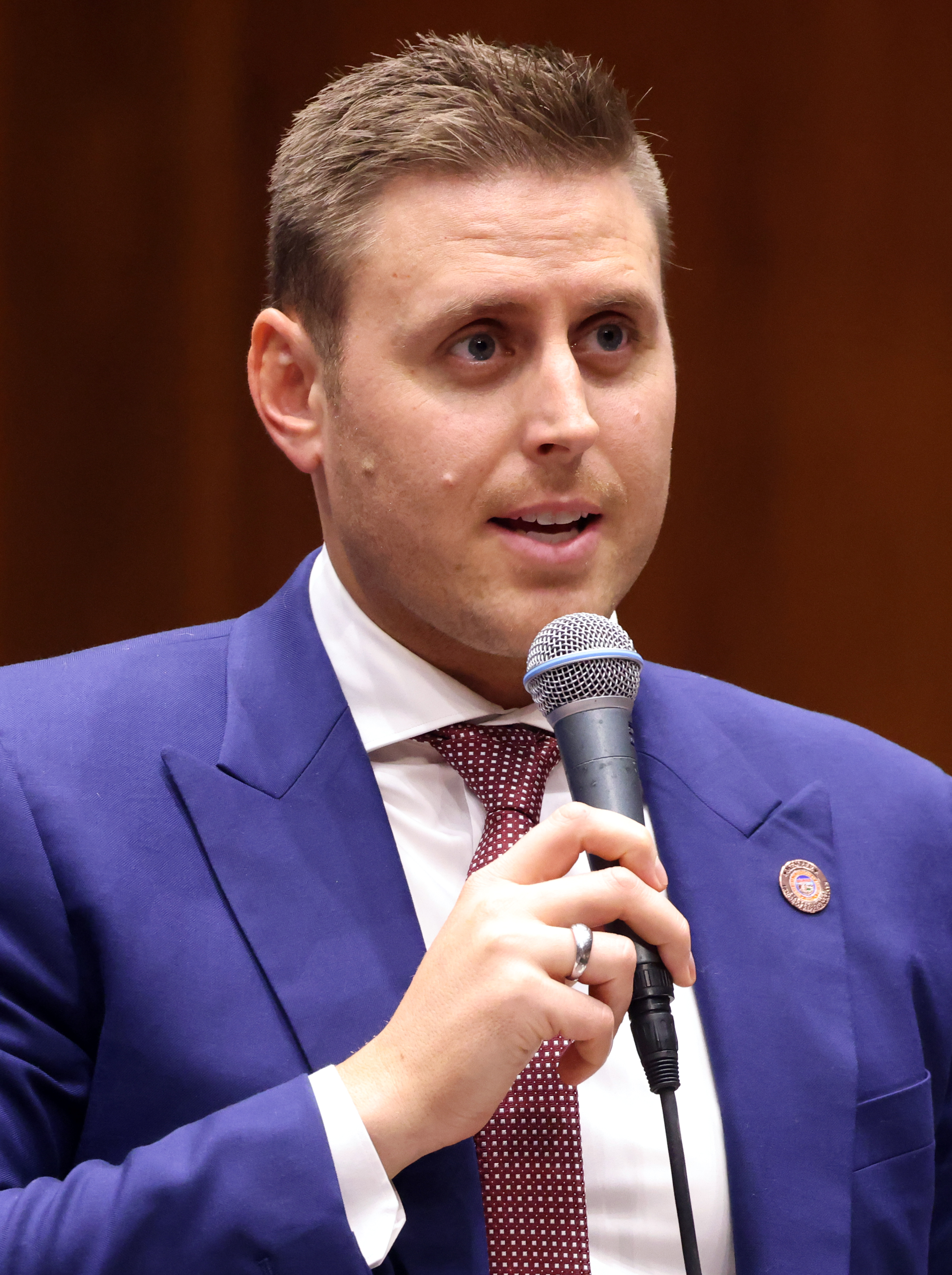
- Way in 2025

Member of the Arizona House of Representatives from the 15th district
- Incumbent
- Assumed office January 13, 2025 Serving with Neal Carter
- Preceded by: Jacqueline Parker

Personal details
- Party: Republican

Michael Way is an American businessman and politician serving as a member of the Arizona House of Representatives for the 15th district since 2025. A Republican, he was elected in 2024 to succeed Jacqueline Parker.
