= Marcelino Quiñonez =

American politician

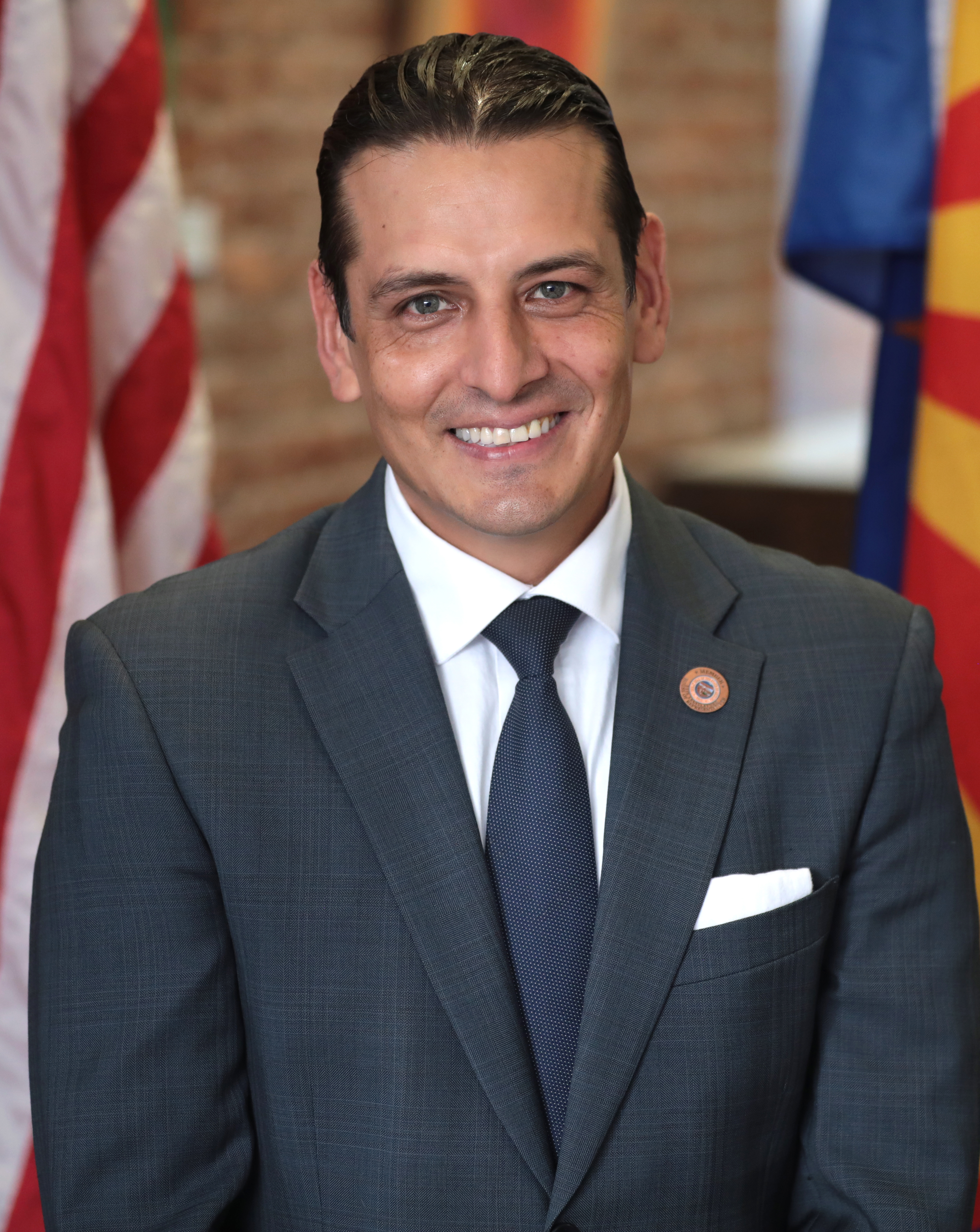
- Quinonez in 2022

Member of the Arizona House of Representatives from the 11th district
- In office January 9, 2023 – April 4, 2024
- Preceded by: Teresa Martinez
- Succeeded by: Junelle Cavero

Member of the Arizona House of Representatives from the 27th district
- In office December 16, 2021 – January 9, 2023 Serving with Reginald Bolding
- Preceded by: Diego Rodriguez
- Succeeded by: Ben Toma

Personal details
- Born: Durango, Mexico
- Party: Democratic
- Education: Arizona State University (BA, MFA)

Marcelino Quiñonez is an American politician, playwright, activist and former member of the Arizona House of Representatives from the 11th district. He assumed office on December 16, 2021 after being appointed to replace Diego Rodriguez.

== Early life and education ==
Quiñonez was born in Durango, Mexico and raised in San Jose, California. After graduating from South Mountain High School, he earned a Bachelor of Arts degree and Master of Fine Arts in theatre from Arizona State University During his education, he studied under Marshall W. Mason.

== Career ==
Quiñonez has worked as a drama teacher at the Arizona School for the Arts and served on the governing board of the Roosevelt Elementary School District. In 2018, Quiñonez co-authored Dear Senator, a play starring and co-written by former Arizona Attorney General Grant Woods. He also wrote and starred as Che Guevara in El Che. In December 2021, Quiñonez was appointed to the Arizona House of Representatives by the Maricopa County Board of Supervisors, succeeding Diego Rodriguez.

On April 4, 2024, Quiñonez resigned from his position as State Representative, effective immediately.
