= David Cook (Arizona politician) =

American politician

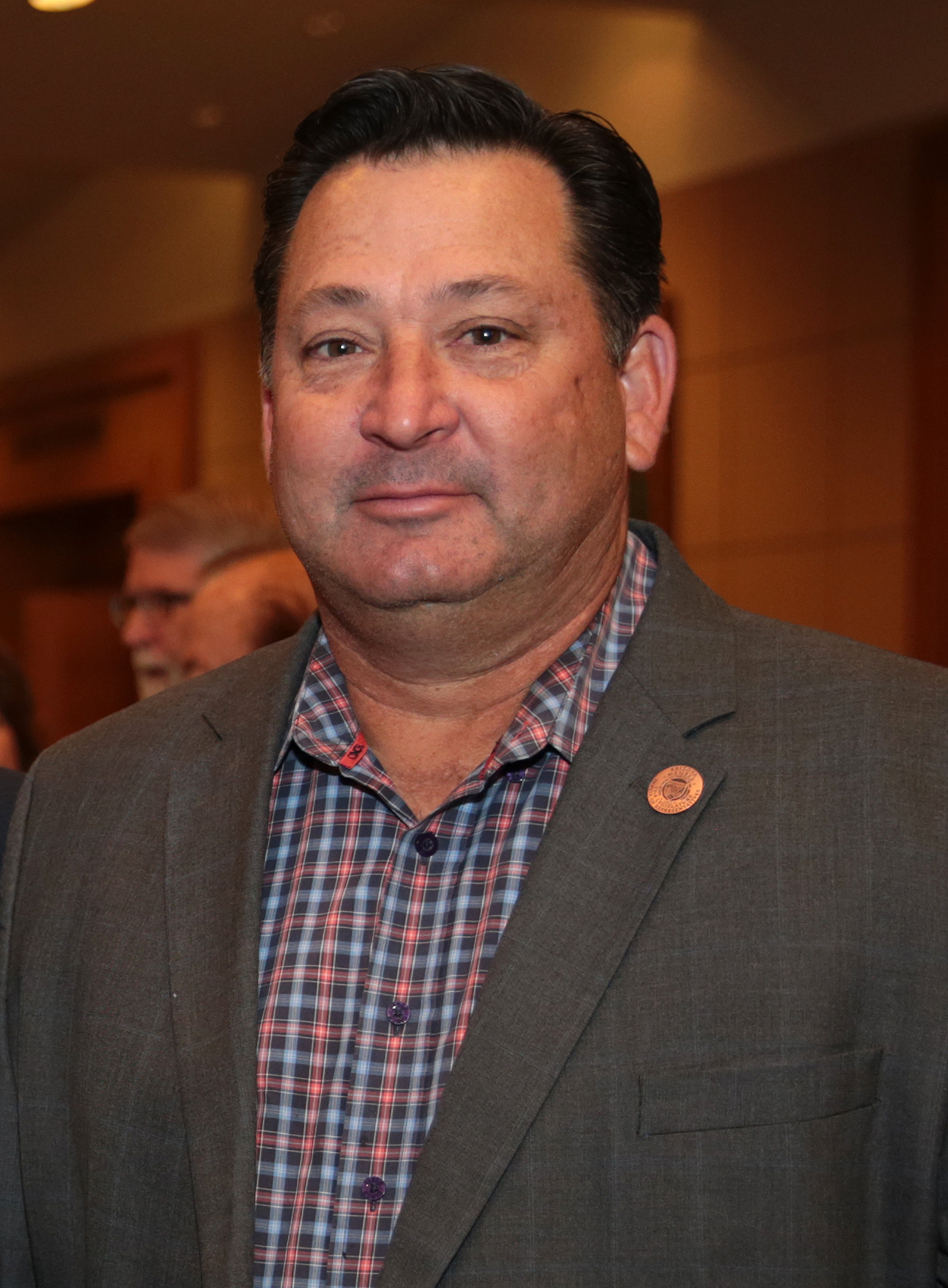

Member of the Arizona House of Representatives
- In office January 9, 2017 – January 13, 2025 Serving with Neal Carter (2021–2023)
- Preceded by: Frank Pratt
- Succeeded by: Walter Blackman
- Constituency: 8th district (2017–2023); 7th district (2023–2025)

Personal details
- Party: Republican
- Spouse: Diana
- Children: 2
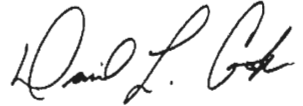
- Signature
- Website: cookarizona.com

David L. Cook is an American Republican politician who was a member Arizona House of Representatives from the 7th legislative district. He was first elected to the state House in 2016 and represented central and eastern Pinal County and southern Gila County.

== Early life and education ==
Cook was born in Ponca City, Oklahoma. As a child, he was involved in 4-H and Future Farmers of America. He moved to Arizona in 1985 and graduated from Miami High School. Cook attended three community colleges: Eastern Arizona College, Rio Salado College, and Central Arizona College. Cook also attended Arizona State University's Certified Public Manager program. He worked for the Arizona Department of Corrections for 12 years.

== Career before politics ==
In 2000 he and his wife founded the DC Cattle Company. He is a rancher who holds a permit for grazing on federal lands.

== Political career ==
=== Arizona House of Representatives ===
In the House of Representatives Cook was a member of the committees on commerce; land, agriculture and rural affairs; military affairs and public safety; and transportation.

In 2020, Cook introduced legislation that would bar the public disclosure of information collected by biologists at public agencies regarding endangered species on private land. The bill was opposed by the Sierra Club; it passed the state House on a 31-29 party-line vote.

On June 7, 2021, Cook was the sole Republican to vote alongside every Democratic member of the House of Representatives against House Bill 2900, which would have established a 2.5% flat tax in Arizona. Cook's vote created a 30–30 deadlock, defeating the bill.

In 2024, Cook ran for the State Senate against incumbent Wendy Rogers, but lost in the Republican primary.

=== 2020 presidential election ===
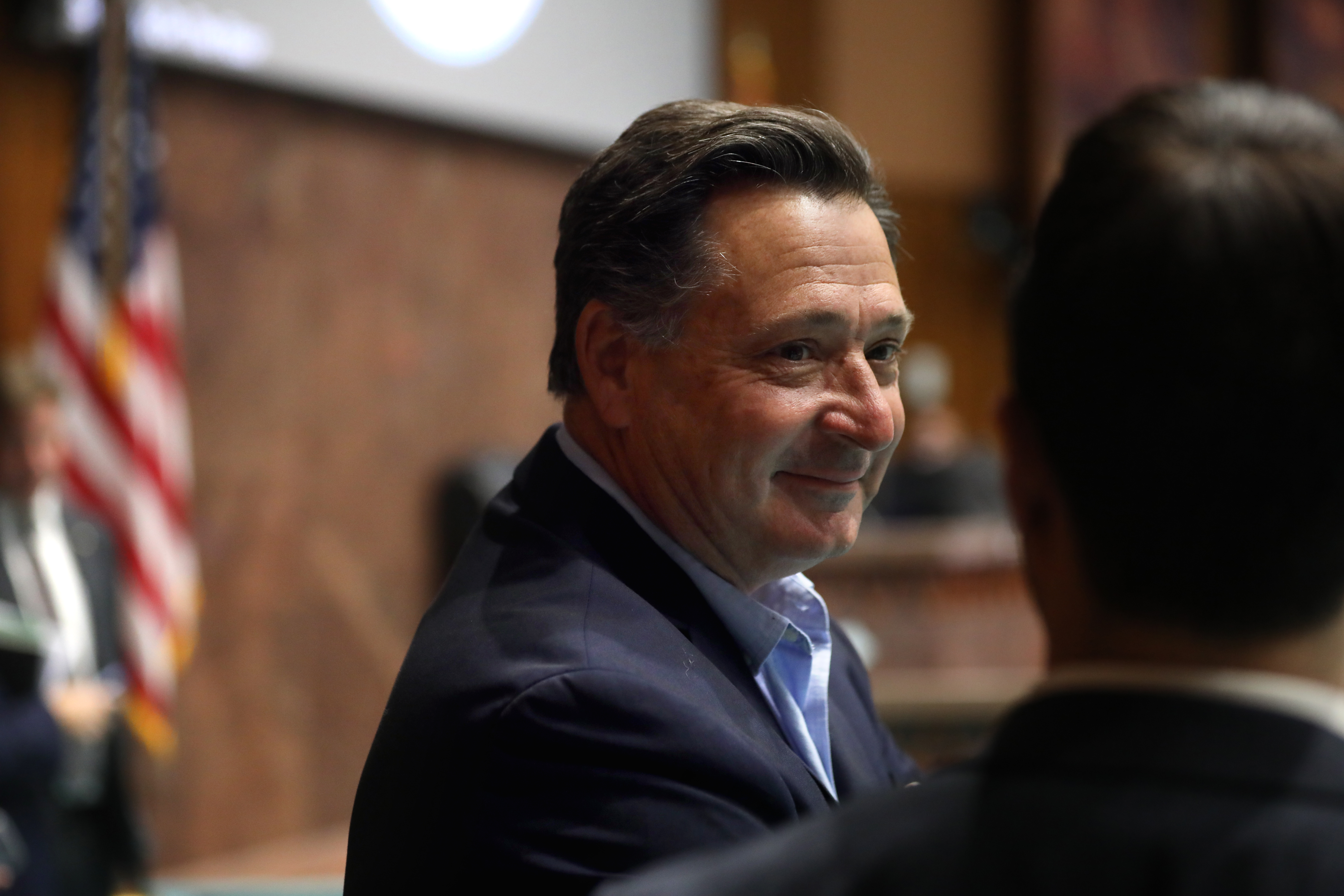
Cook at the Arizona State Capitol in 2023

Following Donald Trump's loss in the 2020 presidential election (both nationally and in Arizona), Cook denied the election results and supported Trump's claims of election fraud.

=== Elections ===
In 2016 Cook and incumbent T. J. Shope defeated Democratic Party candidate Carmen Casillas in the Arizona House of Representatives general election in Arizona's 8th legislative district. In 2020 Cook and Shope were elected over Casillas and fellow Democratic candidate Linda C. Gross. In 2020 Cook and fellow Republican candidate Frank Pratt were elected over Democratic candidates Sharon Girard and Cristefano Lessard.

In 2024, Cook ran for the State Senate in his 7th district, losing to incumbent Wendy Rogers.

== Personal life ==
Cook lives in Globe. He married his wife, Diana in 2000; the couple have two children. He is a member of the National Rifle Association of America and the Knights of Columbus.

=== 2018 arrest ===
On December 19, 2018, Cook was arrested for driving under the influence (DUI) by an Arizona Department of Public Safety trooper in Mesa, Arizona after the officer spotted Cook's vehicle moving out of its lane. When asked to step out of the vehicle, Cook responded with “Do you know what you’re doing, son? You’re making a mistake.” Cook was arrested with a blood alcohol content of between 0.152 percent and 0.158 percent, well above the state limit of 0.08 percent. When the officer informed Cook that he would lose his driver's license, he responded with "I’m fine; don’t worry, you’ll get yours".

In a plea bargain, appearing before a former Arizona state representative, he received a sentence of one day in jail, a fine, plus probation with conditions including no excessive drinking for five years, and he completed a 16-hour online DUI course.
