= Travis Grantham =

American politician

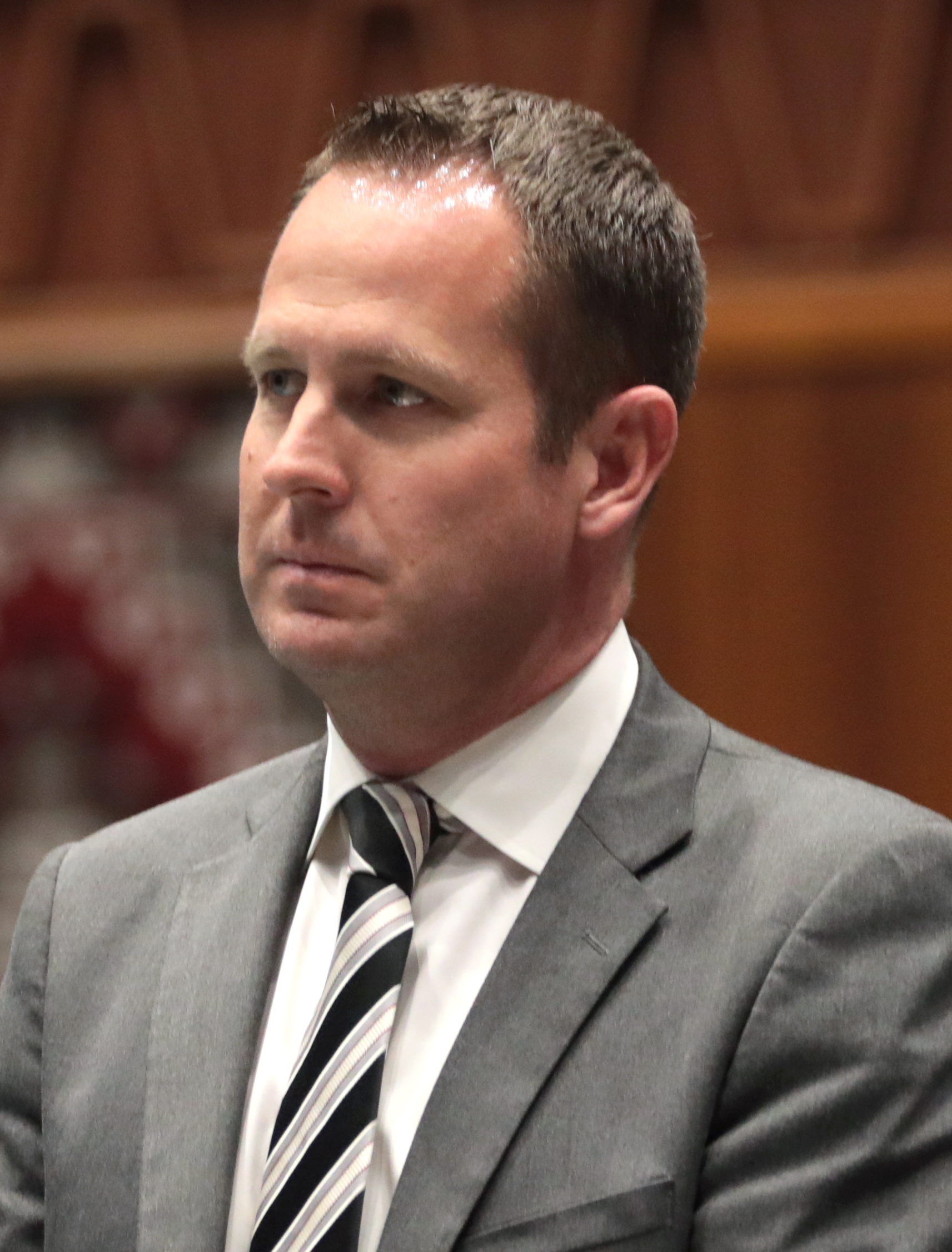
- Grantham in 2023

Speaker pro tempore of the Arizona House of Representatives
- In office January 11, 2021 – January 13, 2025
- Preceded by: T. J. Shope
- Succeeded by: Neal Carter

Member of the Arizona House of Representatives
- In office January 9, 2017 – January 13, 2025
- Preceded by: Warren Petersen
- Succeeded by: Khyl Powell
- Constituency: 12th district (2017–2023); 14th district (2023–2025)

Personal details
- Born: Travis Woodrord Grantham; February 24, 1979 (age 47) Scottsdale, Arizona, U.S.
- Party: Republican
- Education: Arizona State University, Tempe (BS)
- Website: Campaign website

Military service
- Branch/service: United States Air Force; Arizona Air National Guard
- Years of service: 1999–present
- Rank: Lieutenant Colonel
- Unit: 161st Air Refueling Wing
- Battles/wars: Operation Enduring Freedom

Travis Grantham (born February 24, 1979) is an American politician and a Republican former member of the Arizona House of Representatives elected to represent District 14 in 2022. He previously represented District 12 from 2017 to 2023. Grantham was also a 2012 Republican candidate who sought election to the U.S. House of Representatives to represent the 9th congressional district of Arizona.

== Early life ==
Grantham was born on February 24, 1979 in Scottsdale, Arizona, where he attended Scottsdale Public Schools and graduated from Scottsdale Community College. Grantham is a third-generation Arizonan. Grantham's family owned a cattle ranch, and his father was the founder and CEO of an aviation business named International Air Response, Inc. (IAR). Grantham attended Arizona State University, where he received a bachelor's degree in agribusiness. During his time at Arizona State, he enlisted in the Air National Guard, ultimately achieving the rank of staff sergeant before commissioning as an officer out of college.

== Elections ==
In 2012, Grantham ran for the U.S. House in the newly drawn 9th district. He was defeated by Vernon Parker in the 7-way Republican primary, receiving 18.4% of the vote and coming in 3rd.

In 2016, Grantham and incumbent Eddie Farnsworth defeated LaCinda Lewis in the Republican primary for Arizona's 12th legislative district. They were unopposed in the general election.

== Legislative activity ==
In 2018 Grantham sponsored a proposed state constitutional amendment which would have allowed the legislature to place candidates for the US Senate on the ballot. Also in 2018 he opposed the extension of a sales tax used to support education saying, "We're not addressing what I believe to be one of the main issues of the bill - which is hey, there's these buckets in the bill that money is dropped into them and the schools have to spend the money as the bill's written." In 2021 he served as speaker pro tempore of the House. In April 2021, he made news after referring "colored people" and demanding that a black legislator be "sat down" during a debate about a voting rights bill.

== Background and personal information ==
Grantham is a current Lieutenant Colonel in the 161st Air Refueling Wing of the Arizona Air National Guard, in which capacity he has deployed to Afghanistan and Iraq. Grantham is trained on the Boeing KC-135 Stratotanker, in which he has over 3,000 flight hours.

Grantham is married to Patricia Patton and has two daughters, Katelyn and Kristyn. The family lives in Gilbert, Arizona.

Arizona House of Representatives
Preceded by Warren Petersen	Member of the Arizona House of Representatives from the 12th district 2017–2023; Served alongside: Jake Hoffman	Succeeded by Patty Contreras
Preceded by Lupe Diaz	Member of the Arizona House of Representatives from the 14th district 2023–2025; Served alongside: Laurin Hendrix	Succeeded by Khyl Powell
Preceded by T. J. Shope	Speaker pro tempore of the Arizona House of Representatives; 2021–2025	Succeeded by Neal Carter
