= Tim Dunn (politician) =

American politician (born 1966)

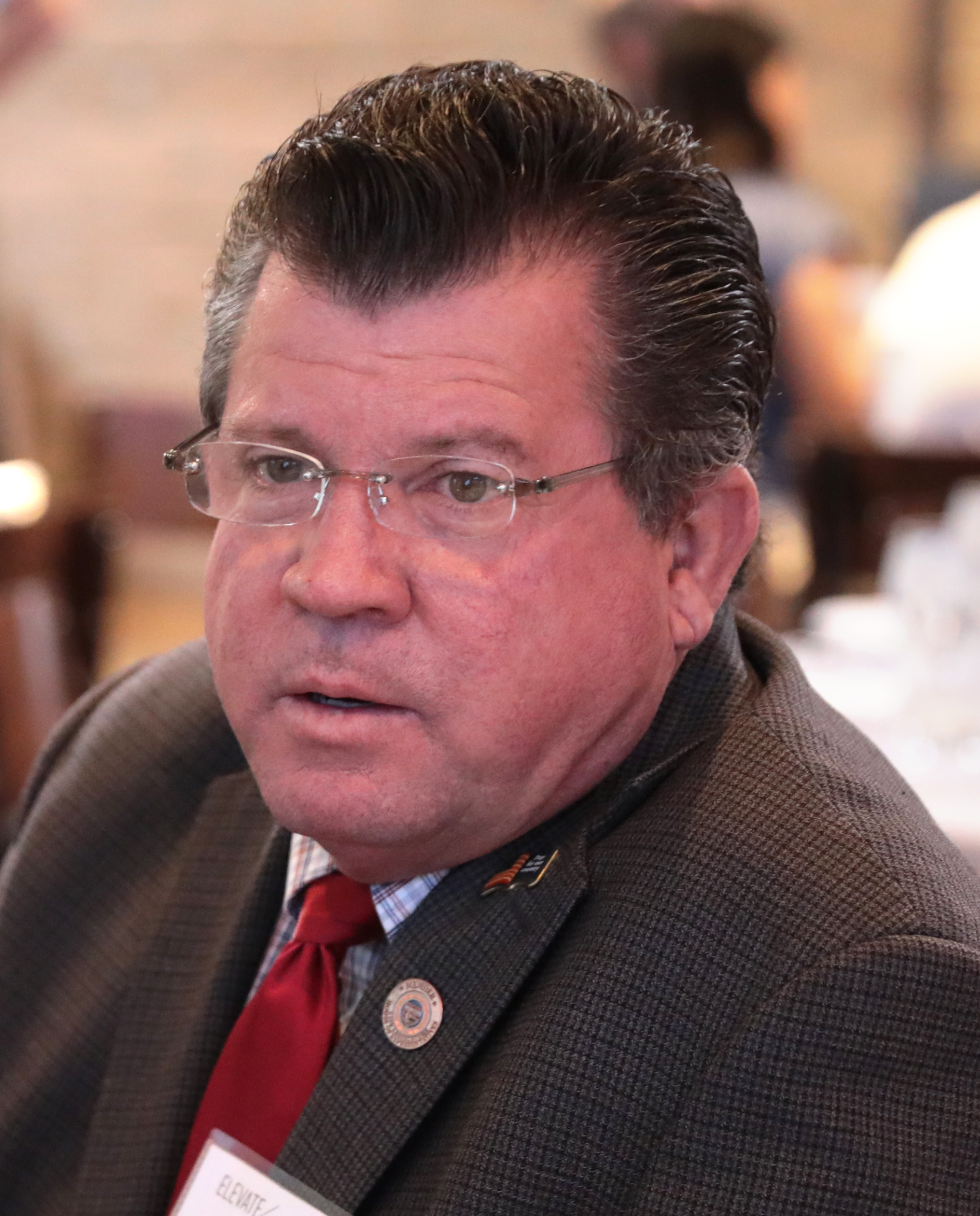
- Dunn in 2022

Member of the Arizona Senate from the 25th district
- Incumbent
- Assumed office January 13, 2025
- Preceded by: Sine Kerr

Member of the Arizona House of Representatives from the 25th district
- In office January 9, 2023 – January 13, 2025 Serving with Michael Carbone
- Preceded by: Michelle Udall
- Succeeded by: Nick Kupper

Member of the Arizona House of Representatives from the 13th district
- In office February 13, 2018 – January 9, 2023 Serving with Joanne Osborne
- Preceded by: Don Shooter
- Succeeded by: Liz Harris

Personal details
- Born: December 13, 1966 (age 59)
- Party: Republican
- Spouse: Eileen Dunn
- Children: 2
- Website: www.timdunnaz.com

Timothy Michael Dunn (born December 13, 1966) is an American politician and a Republican member of the Arizona Senate. He previously served in the Arizona House of Representatives representing District 25 from 2023 to 2025. He also previously represented District 13 from 2018 to 2023. Dunn was appointed to replace expelled representative Don Shooter. Dunn is a farmer in Yuma, Arizona where his business, Dunn Grain Co. Inc., specializes in selling grain seeds. Dunn has proposed the creation of a pipeline transferring water from the Mississippi River to the Colorado River.
