= Neal Carter (politician) =

American politician

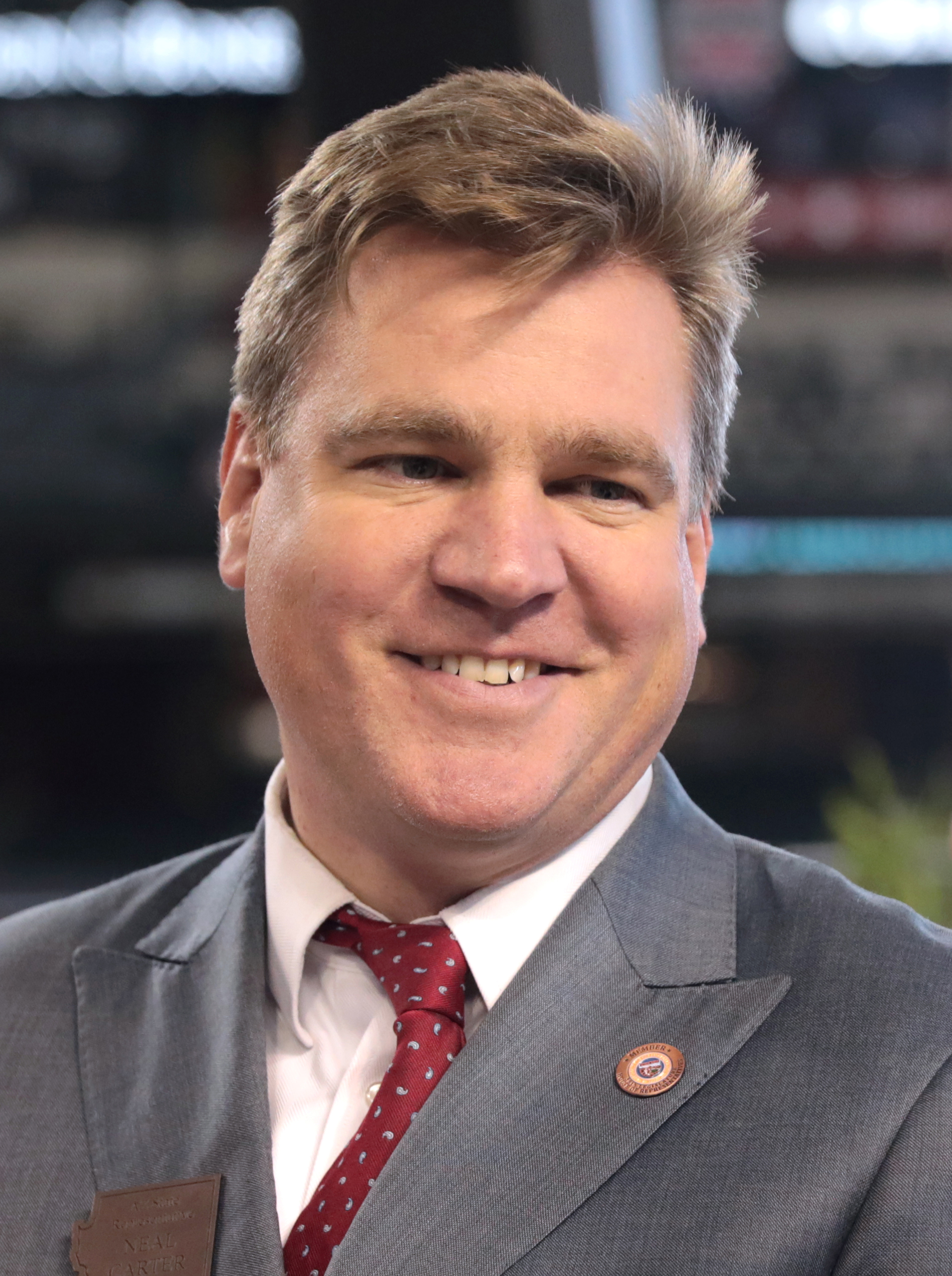
- Carter in 2023

Speaker pro tempore of the Arizona House of Representatives
- Incumbent
- Assumed office January 13, 2025
- Preceded by: Travis Grantham

Member of the Arizona House of Representatives
- Incumbent
- Assumed office November 5, 2021 Serving with David Cook (2021–2023); Michael Way (2023–present)
- Preceded by: Frank Pratt
- Constituency: 8th district (2021–2023); 15th district (2023–present)

Personal details
- Party: Republican
- Education: University of California, Los Angeles (BA); New York University (JD)

Neal Carter is an American politician who has served as a member of the Arizona House of Representatives from the 15th legislative district since 2023. He previously represented the 8th legislative district from 2021 to 2023. He was appointed to the seat after incumbent Representative Frank Pratt died while in office. He is a member of the Republican Party.

Carter is a graduate of the University of California, Los Angeles and the New York University School of Law.

Arizona House of Representatives
Preceded by Travis Grantham	Speaker pro tempore of the Arizona House of Representatives; 2025–present	Incumbent
