= Oscar De Los Santos =

American politician

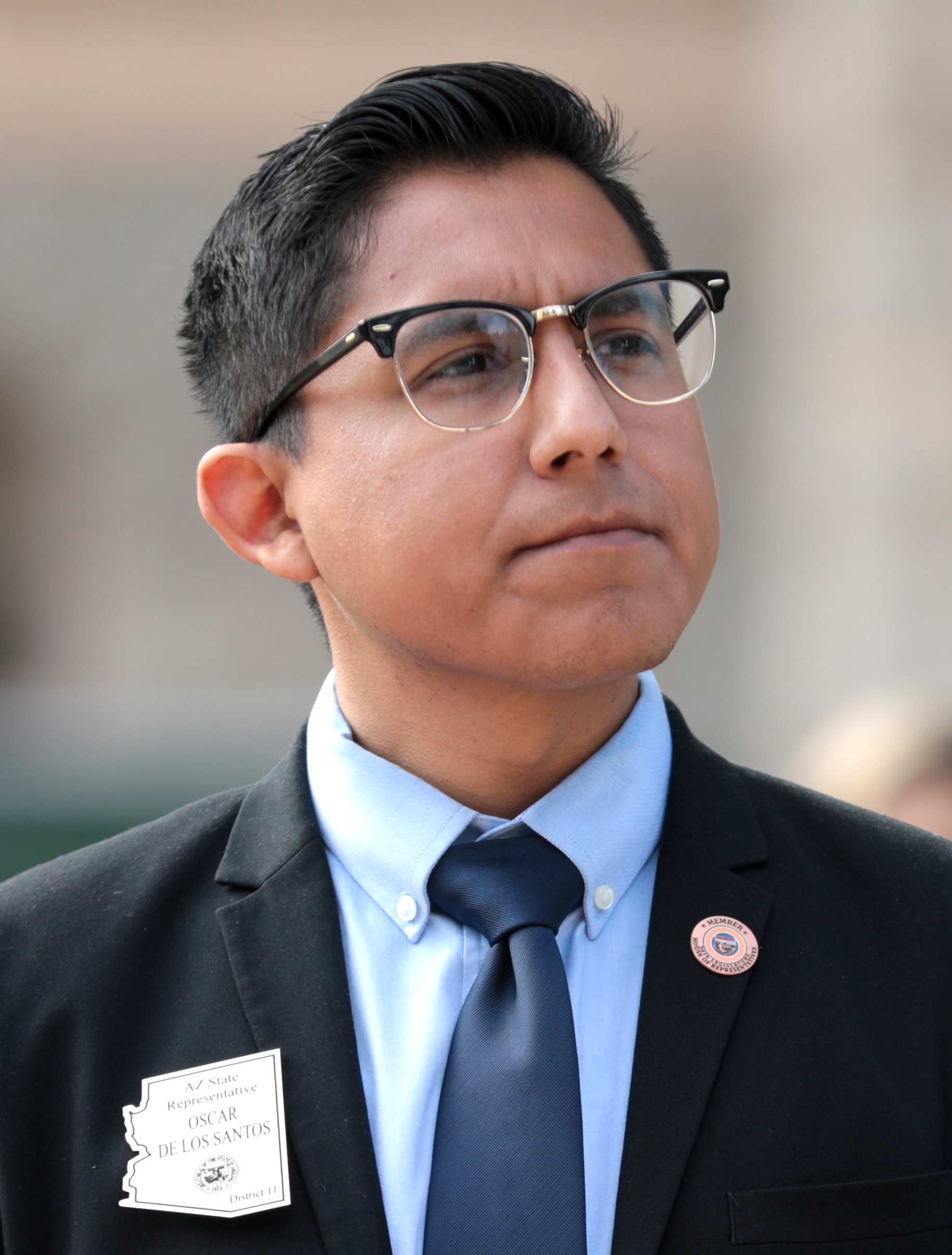
- De Los Santos in 2023

Minority Leader of the Arizona House of Representatives
- Incumbent
- Assumed office January 13, 2025
- Preceded by: Lupe Contreras

Member of the Arizona House of Representatives from the 11th district
- Incumbent
- Assumed office January 9, 2023 Serving with Junelle Cavero
- Preceded by: Mark Finchem

Personal details
- Born: 1994 (age 31–32) Los Angeles, California, U.S.
- Party: Democratic
- Education: University of Southern California (BA); St Antony's College, Oxford (MPP); Union Theological Seminary (MA); Yale University (JD)

Oscar De Los Santos (born 1994) is an American politician. He is a Democratic member of the Arizona House of Representatives elected to represent District 11 in 2022. After the November 2026 election he was selected to be the Speaker of the Arizona House of Representatives.

== Early life and education ==
De Los Santos was born in Los Angeles to Gregorio and María Dolores, both immigrants from Tenamaxtlán. In 2015, De Los Santos completed a Bachelor of Arts in political science from the University of Southern California, where he graduated magna cum laude and was inducted into Phi Beta Kappa. He was also a Truman scholar.

As a Rhodes Scholar, he completed a master's in public policy from St Antony's College, Oxford in 2018. He earned a master's degree in Christian social ethics from the Union Theological Seminary in 2020. He is a Juris Doctor student at Yale Law School and received a Paul & Daisy Soros Fellowship for New Americans in 2022.

== Career ==
In 2012, De Los Santos was the youngest Florida field organizer for the Obama campaign. From 2015 to 2016, he taught English and social studies to sixth graders at Champion South Mountain School in Phoenix, Arizona. He also interned for the National Economic Council and the U.S. House Of Representatives. De Los Santos was a lobbyist and head of public policy for the Association of Arizona Food Banks.

During the 2022 Arizona House of Representatives election, De Los Santos was elected to represent the 11th district. He is the first out LGBT person to represent the district.

Arizona House of Representatives
Preceded by Lupe Contreras	Minority Leader of the Arizona House of Representatives; 2025–present	Incumbent
