= Lupe Contreras =

American politician (born 1975)

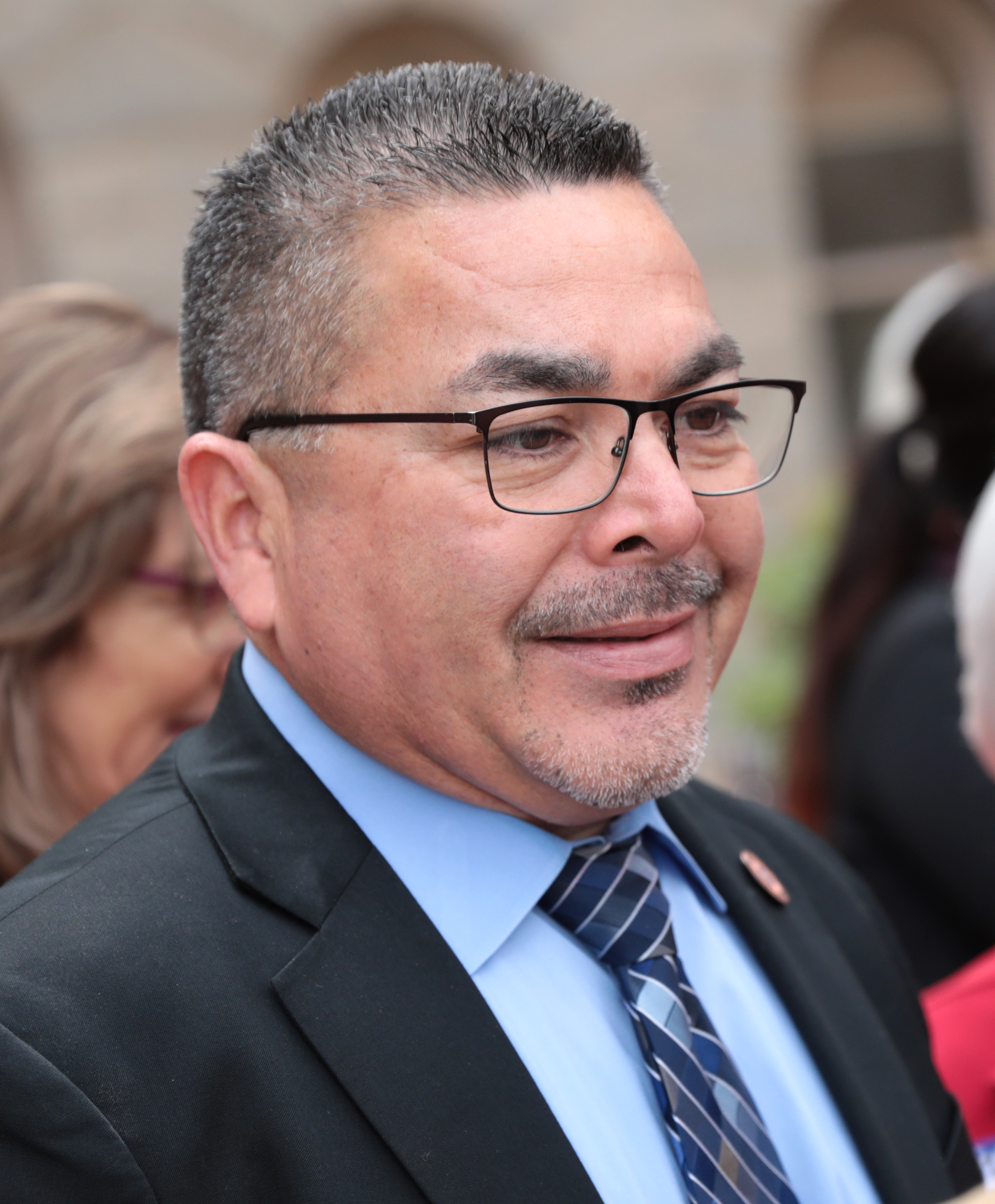
- Contreras in 2023

Minority Leader of the Arizona House of Representatives
- In office June 21, 2023 – January 13, 2025
- Preceded by: Andrés Cano
- Succeeded by: Oscar De Los Santos

Member of the Arizona House of Representatives
- Incumbent
- Assumed office January 9, 2023 Serving with Elda Luna-Nájera
- Preceded by: Frank Carroll
- Succeeded by: Betsy Munoz (elect)
- Constituency: 22nd district
- In office January 2013 – January 2015
- Preceded by: Justin Olson; Justin Pierce
- Succeeded by: Diego Espinoza
- Constituency: 19th district

Member of the Arizona Senate from the 19th district
- In office January 5, 2015 – January 9, 2023
- Preceded by: Anna Tovar
- Succeeded by: David Gowan

Personal details
- Born: Guadalupe Chavira Contreras; July 27, 1975 (age 51) Cashion, Arizona, U.S.
- Party: Democratic
- Education: Glendale Community College; Estrella Mountain Community College

Guadalupe "Lupe" Chavira Contreras (born July 27, 1975) is an American politician. He is a State Representative from Arizona, representing the 22nd district since 2023. In 2023, he was elected as Minority Leader of the Arizona House of Representatives. He was previously a member of the Arizona Senate, representing the 19th district from 2015 to 2023. Prior to serving in the State Senate, Contreras was elected to the Arizona House of Representatives in 2013. Contreras served on the Federalism and Fiscal Responsibility Committee and the Judiciary Committee. He is a member of the Democratic Party.
