= Kevin Payne (politician) =

American politician

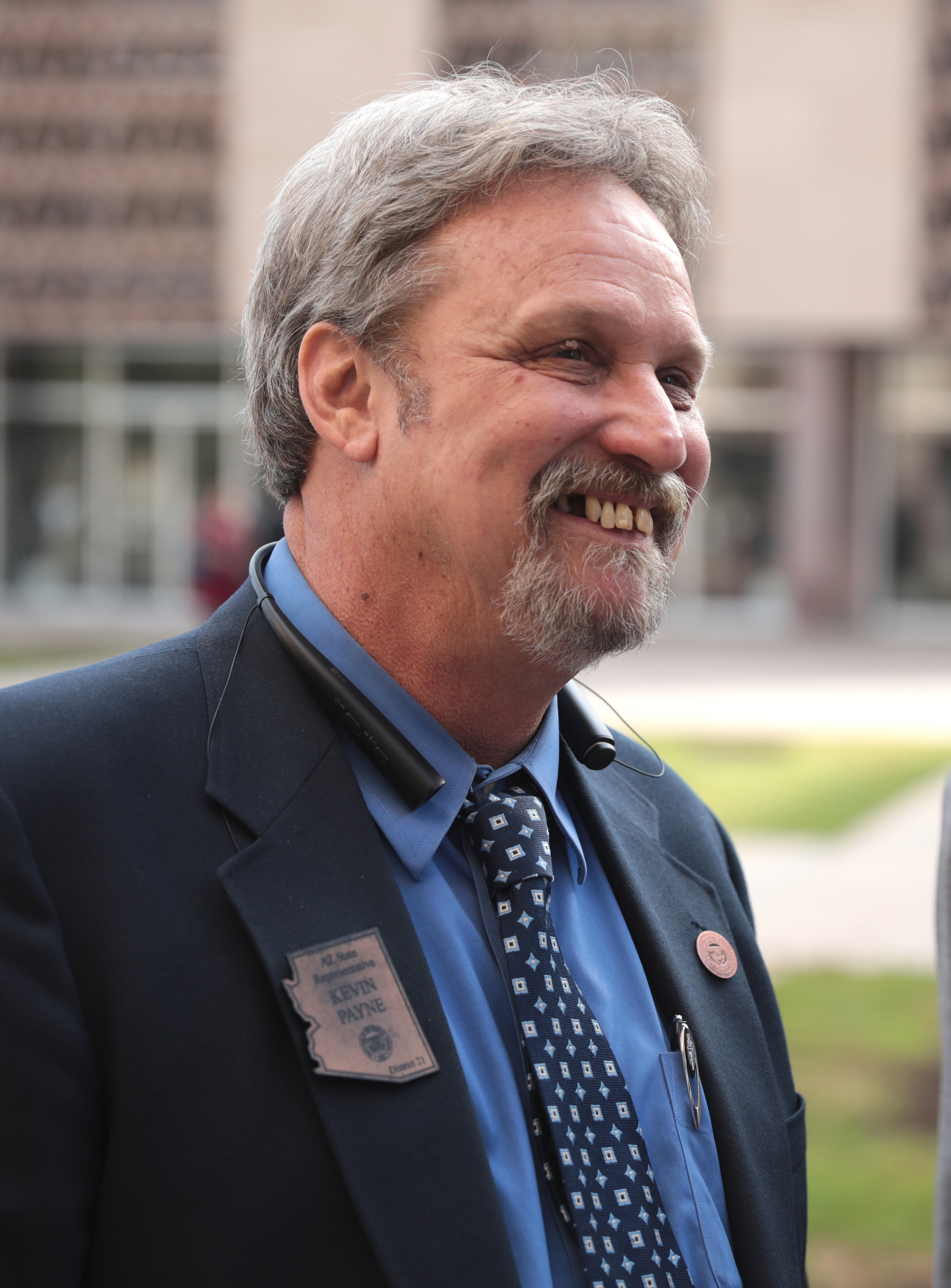

Member of the Arizona Senate from the 27th district
- Incumbent
- Assumed office January 13, 2025
- Preceded by: Anthony Kern
- Succeeded by: Kyle Clayton (elect)

Member of the Arizona House of Representatives from the 27th district
- In office January 9, 2023 – January 13, 2025 Serving with Ben Toma
- Preceded by: Reginald Bolding
- Succeeded by: Lisa Fink

Member of the Arizona House of Representatives from the 21st district
- In office January 9, 2017 – January 9, 2023 Serving with Beverly Pingerelli
- Preceded by: Rick Gray
- Succeeded by: Consuelo Hernandez

Personal details
- Party: Republican
- Website: Campaign Website

Kevin Payne is an American politician and a Republican member of the Arizona Senate. He was previously a member of the Arizona House of Representatives, elected to represent District 27 in 2022. He also previously represented District 21 from 2017 to 2023.

== Elections ==
In 2016, Payne and incumbent Tony Rivero were unopposed in the Republican primary and went on to defeat Democrat Deanna Rasmussen-Lacotta in the general election.
