= Death of Brandon Mendoza =

2014 death in Arizona

Brandon Mendoza was a Hispanic Mesa, Arizona, police officer who was killed in 2014 by an illegal immigrant driving drunk in the wrong lane. Later investigation found that the driver had a lengthy criminal history and was driving without a license. Mendoza was posthumously promoted, and a foundation was set up in his honor. His death became a part of the broader public debate regarding US immigration policy.

== Death ==
Mendoza died on May 12, 2014, in a head-on collision with Raul Silva-Corona, who had a blood alcohol content of 0.24%, or three-times the legal limit. Silva, 42, had driven more than 30 miles (48 km) in the opposite lane; several police officers had tried to stop or ram his vehicle. Silva, an illegal immigrant in the United States, had a criminal record dating back to 1994, which included charges for burglary and assaulting a police officer. He was convicted of a conspiracy charge, but missed his hearing sentence and lived as a fugitive. He was apprehended by the US Border Patrol in 2012. Following Mendoza's death, as Silva had no driver's license, law enforcement had difficulty determining his criminal record. Silva-Corona also died in the crash.

Officer Mendoza, 32, and a 13-year veteran of the police department, was off-duty, having finished his work shift, and was driving his own car when he was hit. Mendoza was one of the first officers to volunteer to wear a body camera.

== Aftermath ==
Mendoza was posthumously promoted to the rank of sergeant.

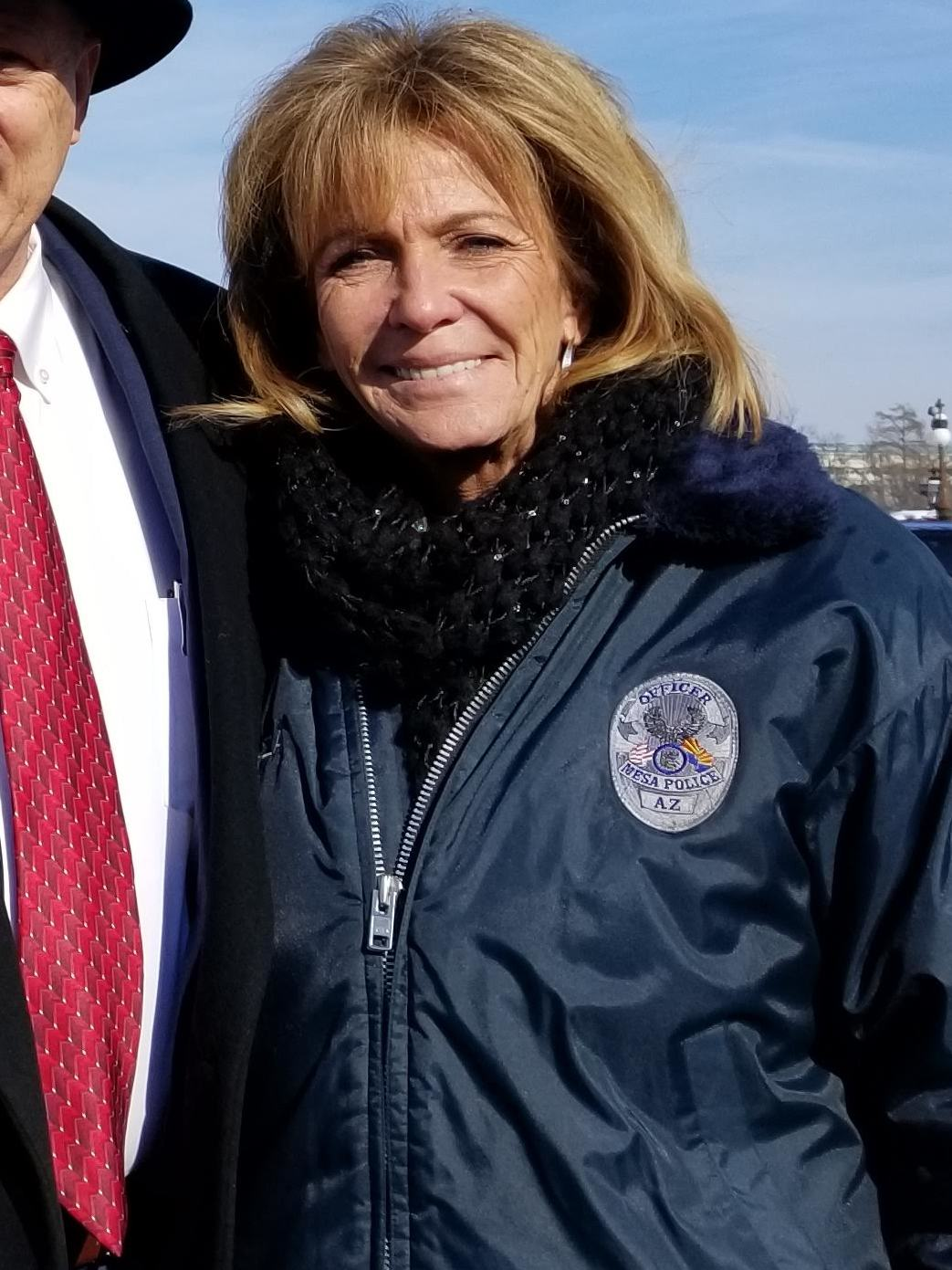
Mendoza's mother, Mary Ann Mendoza

Following the incident, Mary Ann Mendoza, his mother, wrote a letter to then President Barack Obama requesting that "illegal aliens" not be allowed to register vehicles. Mendoza's mother shared her story with then-candidate Donald Trump and appeared with him in a television panel together with other victims' families and at an August 2016 speech in Phoenix, Arizona, where Trump laid out his administration's immigration proposals. Mendoza's mother is the Founder of the national Angel Families group on her son's behalf. She has appeared at several Angel Families rallies and a range of other public events.

Mendoza's mother was a guest speaker at the 2016 Republican National Convention. She worked with the Trump administration to establish the Victims of Immigration Crime Engagement office. In 2020, Arizona congressman Andy Biggs announced she would attend the year's State of the Union address as his guest.

In 2019, Mendoza spoke at the Quad Cities Immigration Forum alongside Nick Fuentes, an avowed white nationalist and anti semite, who warned the crowd of the "drastic consequences" of non-white immigration to the United States.

She was scheduled to speak at the 2020 Republican National Convention. Her appearance, however, was canceled following social media posts which included antisemitic conspiracy theories related to the QAnon group. Trump campaign communications director Tim Murtaugh confirmed that Mendoza was dropped. "We have removed the scheduled video from the convention lineup and it will no longer run this week," he said in a statement to ABC News.

=== Mendoza Field ===
In 2014, the City of Mesa honored Mendoza by deciding to rename the baseball field in his name, though at the honoring ceremony at the field, the final name had not yet been selected. In 2015, in a ceremony at the field, it was formally dedicated as "Mendoza Field."
