= Arizona's 22nd legislative district =

American legislative district

- Map of District 22: Approved January 21, 2022
- Senator: Eva Diaz (D)
- House members: Lupe Contreras (D); Elda Luna-Nájera (D)
- Registration: 38.28% Democratic; 19.92% Republican; 39.74% Other
- Demographics: 19% White; 10% Black/African American; 2% Native American; 4% Asian; 64% Hispanic
- Population: 238,320
- Voting-age population: 164,609
- Registered voters: 103,673

Arizona's 22nd legislative district is one of 30 in the state, consisting of a section of Maricopa County. As of 2023, there are 40 precincts in the district, all in Maricopa, with a total registered voter population of 103,673. The district has an overall population of 238,320.

Following the 2020 United States redistricting cycle, the Arizona Independent Redistricting Commission (AIRC) redrew legislative district boundaries in Arizona. The 22nd district was drawn as a majority Latino constituency, with 64% of residents being Hispanic or Latino. According to the AIRC, the district is outside of competitive range and considered leaning Democratic.

== Political representation ==
The district is represented in the 56th Arizona State Legislature, which convenes from January 1, 2023, to December 31, 2024, by Eva Diaz (D-Tolleson) in the Arizona Senate and by Lupe Contreras (D-Cashion) and Elda Luna-Nájera (D-Tolleson) in the Arizona House of Representatives.

Name	Image	Residence	Office	Party
Eva Diaz		Tolleson	State senator	Democrat
Lupe Contreras		Cashion	State representative	Democrat
Elda Luna-Nájera		Tolleson	State representative	Democrat

== Election results ==
The 2022 elections were the first in the newly drawn district.

=== Arizona Senate ===
2022 Arizona's 22nd Senate district election (Write-in)
Party	Candidate	Votes	%
Democratic	Eva Diaz	6,629	58.97
Republican	Steven Robinson	3,722	33.11
Democratic	Steven Chapman	545	4.85
Write-in	Other write-ins	345	3.07
Total votes		11,241	100.00
Democratic hold			

=== Arizona House of Representatives ===
2022 Arizona House of Representatives election, 22nd district
Party	Candidate	Votes	%
Democratic	Lupe Contreras	25,974	53.03
Democratic	Leezah Sun	23,004	46.97
Total votes		48,978	100.00
Democratic hold			
Democratic hold			

== See also ==
- List of Arizona legislative districts
- Arizona State Legislature
