= Michael Carbone =

American politician

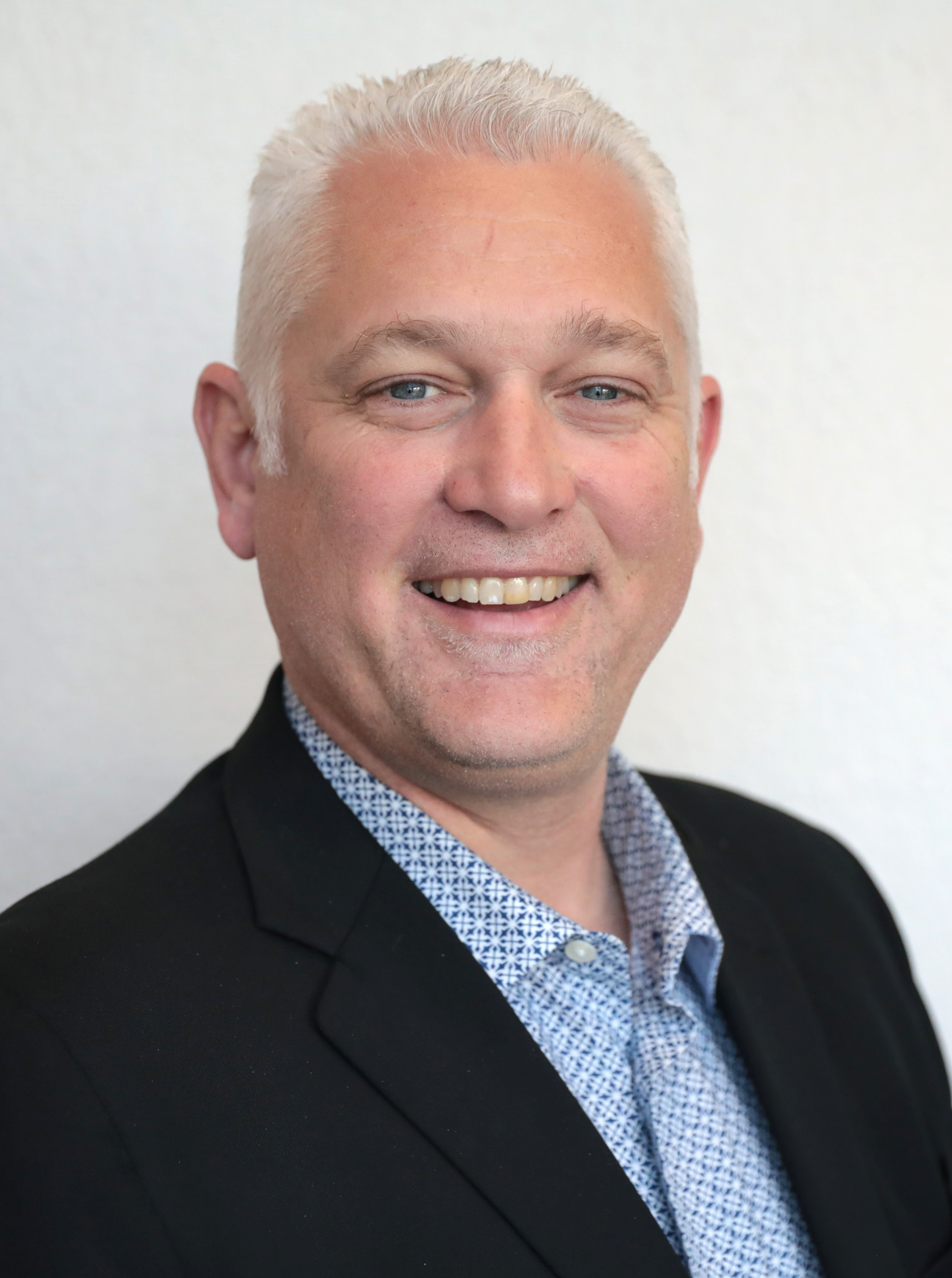
- Carbone in 2022

Majority Leader of the Arizona House of Representatives
- Incumbent
- Assumed office January 13, 2025
- Preceded by: Leo Biasiucci

Member of the Arizona House of Representatives from the 25th district
- Incumbent
- Assumed office January 9, 2023 Serving with Nick Kupper
- Preceded by: Russell Bowers

Personal details
- Born: Michael Robert Carbone; February 1973 (age 53) Antioch, Illinois, U.S.
- Party: Republican
- Education: Georgia College and State University (attended); Columbia College Chicago (BA); Grand Canyon University (MPA)
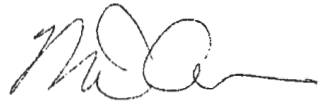
- Signature
- Website: Campaign Website

Michael Robert Carbone (born February 1973) is an American politician and Republican member of the Arizona House of Representatives elected to represent District 25 in 2022.

== Biography ==
A native of Illinois, Carbone was adopted by his grandparents. As an adult, he was involved with conservative politics while in Illinois, and later moved to Arizona to raise his family.

In 2024, Carbone sponsored state legislation to ban no-excuse early voting in Arizona (no-excuse early voting was ushered into existence in 1991 by Arizona Republicans).

== Elections ==
In 2022, Carbone and Tim Dunn won the Republican primary for Legislative District 25, defeating incumbent state representative Joel John. They were unchallenged in the general election.

Arizona House of Representatives
Preceded by Leo Biasiucci	Majority Leader of the Arizona House of Representatives; 2025–present	Incumbent
