= Arizona's 14th legislative district =

American legislative district

- Map of District 14: Approved January 21, 2022
- Senator: Warren Petersen (R)
- House members: Travis Grantham (R); Laurin Hendrix (R)
- Registration: 43.39% Republican; 21.77% Democratic; 33.21% Other
- Demographics: 68% White; 5% Black/African American; 2% Native American; 8% Asian; 16% Hispanic
- Population: 241,692
- Voting-age population: 169,224
- Registered voters: 147,841

Arizona's 14th legislative district is one of 30 in the state, consisting of a section of Maricopa County. As of 2023, there are 44 precincts in the district, all in Maricopa, with a total registered voter population of 147,841. The district has an overall population of 241,692.

Following the 2020 United States redistricting cycle, the Arizona Independent Redistricting Commission (AIRC) redrew legislative district boundaries in Arizona. According to the AIRC, the district is outside of competitive range and considered leaning Republican.

== Political representation ==
The district is represented in the 56th Arizona State Legislature, which convenes from January 1, 2023, to December 31, 2024, by Warren Petersen (R-Gilbert) in the Arizona Senate and by Travis Grantham (R-Gilbert) and Laurin Hendrix (R-Gilbert) in the Arizona House of Representatives.

Name	Image	Residence	Office	Party
Warren Petersen		Gilbert	State senator	Republican
Travis Grantham		Gilbert	State representative	Republican
Laurin Hendrix		Gilbert	State representative	Republican

== Election results ==
The 2022 elections were the first in the newly drawn district.

=== Arizona Senate ===
2022 Arizona's 14th Senate district election
Party	Candidate	Votes	%
Republican	Warren Petersen (incumbent)	64,591	100
Total votes		64,591	100
Republican hold			

=== Arizona House of Representatives ===
2022 Arizona House of Representatives election, 14th district
Party	Candidate	Votes	%
Republican	Travis Grantham (incumbent)	52,827	36.36
Republican	Laurin Hendrix	52,112	35.87
Democratic	Brandy Resse	40,349	27.77
Total votes		145,288	100.00
Republican hold			
Republican hold			

== See also ==
- List of Arizona legislative districts
- Arizona State Legislature
