= Kelli Butler =

American politician

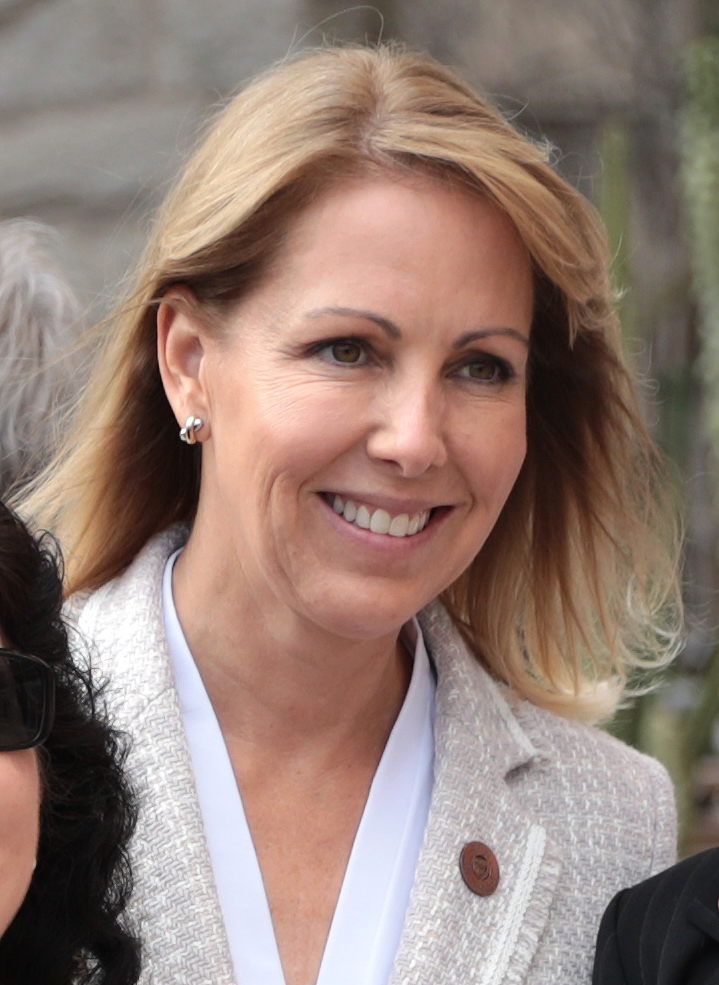
- Butler in 2019

Member of the Arizona House of Representatives from the 28th district
- In office January 9, 2017 – January 9, 2023
- Preceded by: Eric Meyer
- Succeeded by: Laura Terech

Personal details
- Born: Scottsdale, Arizona
- Party: Democratic
- Education: University of Arizona
- Website: Kelli Butler

Kelli Butler is an American politician and a former Democratic member of the Arizona House of Representatives elected to represent District 28 in 2016, until 2023. She is a member of the Maricopa County Community College District Governing Board. She is also the owner and office manager at Butler Family Dental.

She ran in 2024 but was defeated.

== Elections ==
- 2016 – With incumbents Kate Brophy McGee and Eric Meyer both running for the state senate, Butler was unopposed in the open District 28 Democratic Primary. Butler and Republican Maria Syms defeated Republican Mary Hamway in the general election.
- 2014 – Butler was unopposed in the Democratic primary for district 28 Senate, and lost to incumbent Adam Driggs in the general election.
