= Frank Carroll (Arizona politician) =

American politician

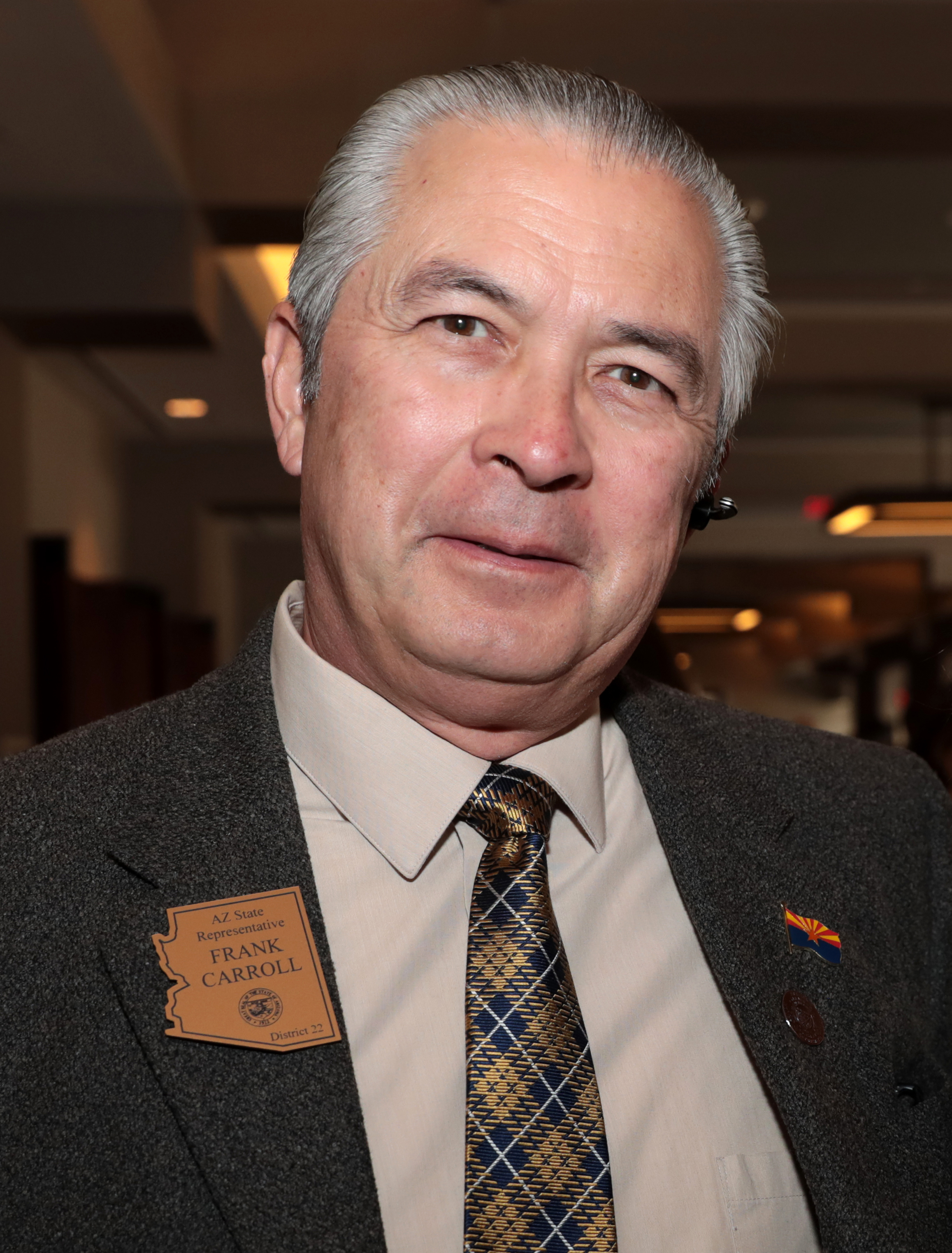
- Carroll in 2019

Member of the Arizona Senate from the 28th district
- Incumbent
- Assumed office January 9, 2023
- Preceded by: Christine Marsh

Member of the Arizona House of Representatives from the 22nd district
- In office January 14, 2019 – January 9, 2023 Serving with Ben Toma
- Preceded by: David Livingston
- Succeeded by: Lupe Contreras

Personal details
- Party: Republican

Frank Carroll is an American politician and a Republican member of the Arizona Senate representing District 28 since January 9, 2023. He was a member of the Arizona House of Representatives from 2019 to 2023, representing House District 22. Carroll was first elected in 2018 to succeed State Representative David Livingston, who instead ran for State Senate.

== Political career ==
According to his campaign website, Carroll was born in Chicago and later moved to Arizona, becoming involved with the Arizona Republican Party, becoming a precinct captain and precinct committeeman. He describes himself as a "Christian constitutional conservative."

=== Elections to the state legislature ===
Carroll was first elected to the Arizona House of Representatives for Legislative District (LD) 22 in 2018. The seat had recently been vacated by Phil Lovas, who resigned to accept a position in the Trump administration; the Maricopa County Board of Supervisors appointed Ben Toma to fill the vacancy, for the remainder of Lovas's term. In the 2017 Republican primary election, Carroll, then a Republican precinct committeeman, ran against Toma, business owner and former Peoria Unified School District member Matt Bullock, and former Maricopa County Community College District member John Heep. Toma and Carroll won the Republican primary and advanced to the general election, in which they defeated the Democratic candidates. Toma and Carroll were both reelected in 2020.

In the post-2020 redistricting cycle, Carroll and Toma, along with fellow Republican state Representative Beverly Pingerelli and state Senator David Livingston, were drawn into LD 28, which includes the northwest Valley of the Sun. However, a high-profile primary battle among incumbents was avoided, because Toma moved to District 27, and Carroll had already declared his candidacy for the Arizona State Senate seat for LD 28, which encompasses Sun City, Sun City West, much of Peoria and portions of north Phoenix. He defeated Clair Van Steenwyk in the August 2022 Republican primary, and won the November 2022 election with 61.8% of the vote, defeating Democratic nominee David Sandoval, who won 38.2% of the vote.

=== Tenure in office ===
Carroll is part of a group of far-right, self-identified Christian conservative lawmakers in Arizona. Along with fellow Republican David Livingston, he is a member of the National Association of Christian Lawmakers, an organization founded by Jason Rapert in 2019 that opposes same-sex marriage and supports anti-abortion legislation. In 2021, Carroll was among a group of state House Republicans to introduce legislation (House Bill 2650) to classify abortion as "1st-degree premeditated murder" and force local prosecutors to file charges against women who receive abortions and doctors who provide abortions. Democrats and abortion rights groups denounced the measure as extreme.

In 2019, Carroll was part of a bipartisan group of Arizona lawmakers who, following a deadly flood, supported the appropriation of $20 million to build a bridge over Tonto Creek at a site known as the Bar X crossing.

After President Donald Trump lost his bid for reelection in November 2020, Carroll was among the Republicans who denied or questioned Trump's election loss, and supported Trump's attempts to subvert the election results and remain in power. In December 2020, he signed onto an amicus brief supporting the State of Texas's failed bid to overturn the election. In 2022, Carroll continued to question the validity of Trump's 2020 election loss. In 2021, Carroll sponsored legislation that would allow the Legislature to allocate two of Arizona's electoral votes rather than giving the state's full slate of electoral votes to the candidate who won the most votes.

In 2023, Carroll sponsored legislation to purge the Arizona voter rolls every decade beginning in 2031, canceling the voter registration of all of the state's registered voters (which numbered 4.2 million on 2023) every ten years, forcing each to re-register. His proposal (Senate Bill 1566) was criticized by the Arizona Association of Counties, which noted that it would violate the National Voter Registration Act. Carroll's bill passed the Elections Committee on a party-line vote, although it was denounced by Democrats and some Republicans.

In May 2023, Carroll urged Florida governor Ron DeSantis to seek the 2024 Republican presidential nomination.

In 2022 and 2023, Carroll introduced legislation to bar the State of Arizona from contracting with any business that "discriminates" against firearm manufacturers or the National Rifle Association of America. Carroll introduced the bill, based on a nearly identical measure enacted in Texas, that targeted banks that declined to take gun manufacturers on as clients following shooting massacres. The Arizona Association of Counties and the Arizona Bankers Association opposed Carroll's bill. The legislature passed the bill (Senate Bill 1096) in 2023, but it was vetoed by Governor Katie Hobbs, who wrote in her veto message: "I once again urge the legislature to focus on providing real solutions to real challenges faced by our state."

== Personal life ==
Carroll lives in Sun City West.
