= David Livingston (politician) =

American politician

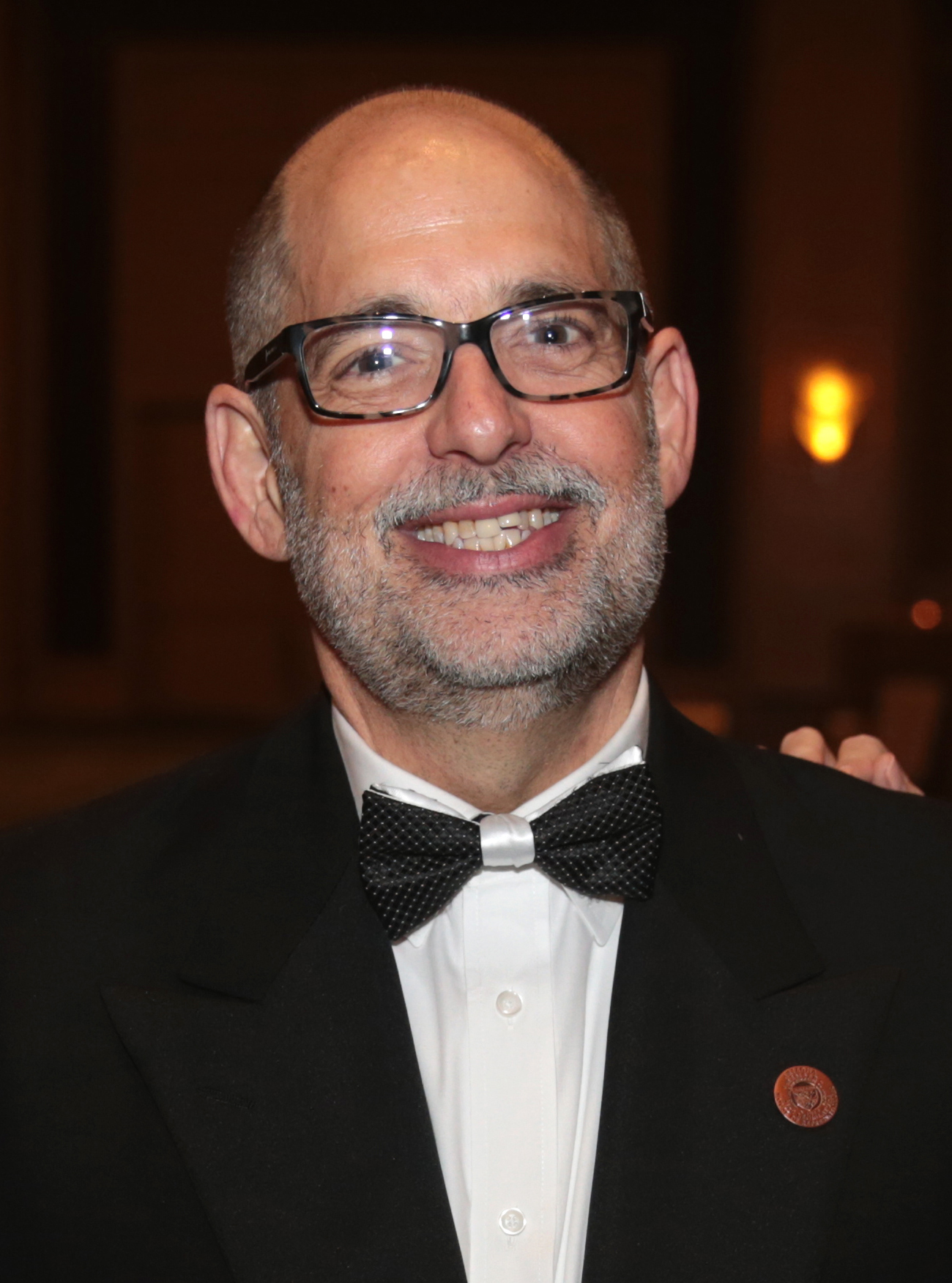
- Livingston in 2018

Member of the Arizona House of Representatives from the 28th district
- Incumbent
- Assumed office January 9, 2023 Serving with Beverly Pingerelli
- Preceded by: Kelli Butler

Member of the Arizona Senate from the 22nd district
- In office January 14, 2019 – January 9, 2023
- Preceded by: Judy Burges
- Succeeded by: Eva Diaz

Member of the Arizona House of Representatives from the 22nd district
- In office January 14, 2013 – January 14, 2019
- Succeeded by: Frank Carroll

Personal details
- Party: Republican
- Spouse: Tracy
- Education: Arizona State University
- Website: votelivingston.com

David Livingston is an American politician and a Republican member of the Arizona House of Representatives representing District 28. He previously served in the Arizona Senate representing District 22 from 2019 to 2023. He also served in the Arizona House of Representatives from 2013 to 2019. During the 52nd Legislature of Arizona, Livingston was the House Majority Whip. Livingston announced that he was running for State Treasurer in 2022, but withdrew before the primary.

== Personal life and education ==
Livingston earned his bachelor's degree in finance from Arizona State University. Livingston is married to Tracy Livingston, a member of the Maricopa County Community College District governing board.

== Career ==
Livingston was a district-level delegate to the 2016 Republican National Convention from Arizona, where he supported Ted Cruz.

=== State Senate ===
In February 2019 Livingston introduced SB 1475, which originally would have required teachers and real estate agents (and others who are required to provide fingerprints as part of licensing) to provide their DNA samples for a state DNA database. After public outcry, he amended the bill so that it would only apply to people licensed to provide direct care in an intermediate care facility to individuals with intellectual disabilities.

=== 2020 presidential election ===
Following the 2020 United States presidential election, Livingston supported the "Stop the Steal" movement which claimed that Donald Trump won the election nationally and in Arizona.

== Elections ==
In 2012, with incumbent Republican Representative (and former State Senator) Jack Wesley Harper deciding to not run for re-election to the Legislature, instead throwing his support behind Livingston Phil Lovas, Livingston ran in the three-way August 28, 2012 Republican primary, placing second with 13,000 votes, and won the first seat in the November 6, 2012 general election with 60,093 votes above Lovas and independent write-in candidate Pat White.

In 2014 Livingston and Lovas were unopposed in the Republican primary and won reelection against Democrats Larry Woods and Bonnie Boyce-Wilson, Independent Fred Botha and Americans Elect candidate Suzie Easter with Livingston winning 41,832 votes.

In 2016 Livingston and Lovas were unopposed in the Republican primary and won reelection against Democrat Manuel Hernandez in the general election.
