= Charlene Fernandez =

American politician (born 1955)

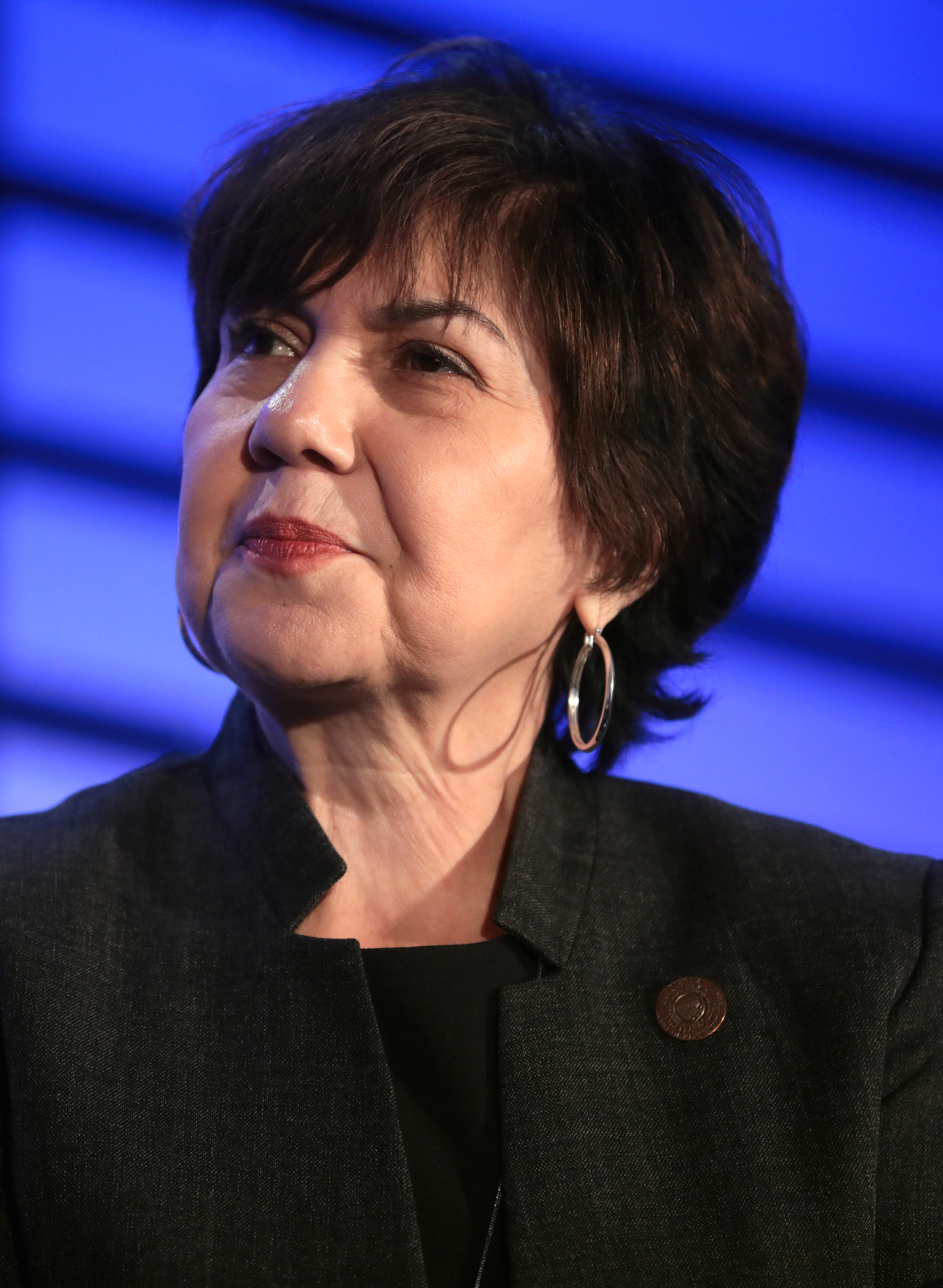
- Fernandez in 2019

Chair of the Arizona Democratic Party
- Incumbent
- Assumed office September 16, 2025
- Preceded by: Kim Khoury (acting)

Minority Leader of the Arizona House of Representatives
- In office January 14, 2019 – January 11, 2021
- Preceded by: Rebecca Rios
- Succeeded by: Reginald Bolding

Member of the Arizona House of Representatives from the 4th district
- In office January 12, 2015 – November 15, 2021 Serving with Joel John
- Preceded by: Juan Carlos Escamilla
- Succeeded by: Brian Fernandez

Personal details
- Born: Charlene Elise Ramos; February 24, 1955 (age 71) Yuma, Arizona, U.S.
- Party: Democratic
- Spouse: Sergio Fernandez
- Children: 3
- Education: Arizona Western College, Yuma (attended); Northern Arizona University (BS)
- Website: Campaign website

Charlene Fernandez (née Ramos; born February 24, 1955) is an American politician who is the Chairwoman of the Arizona Democratic Party. She formerly served as the Democratic leader of the Arizona House of Representatives from 2019 to 2021. She was first elected to the state House in 2014 and represents Southwestern Arizona, specifically, the majority of Yuma County, western Pima County, southwestern Maricopa County and southwestern Pinal County. She resigned on November 15, 2021 to take a position at the U.S. Department of Agriculture. Her son Brian Fernandez was appointed by the Yuma County, Arizona Board of Supervisors to succeed her in the Arizona House of Representatives.

== Early life and education ==
Fernandez was born in Yuma, Arizona to the late Antonio "Tony" Ramos and Carmen Ramos. She attended Yuma High School where she graduated, and went on to attend Arizona Western College before transferring to Northern Arizona University earning a Bachelor of Science degree in education.

== Career ==
Fernandez worked for Congressman Ed Pastor for twelve years, coordinating constituent services for the western portion of then Congressional District 2. While working for Congressman Pastor, Charlene spearheaded an effort that culminated in bringing a Veteran's Administration clinic to Yuma County for the first time in history; previously the Phoenix Veterans facility was the closest place for them to receive these services. Her experience led to her becoming a consultant for a software company that produced a Constituent Management System for the U.S. House of Representatives.

Charlene later served Governor Janet Napolitano as a liaison for the Arizona Department of Environment Quality in Yuma County. In this capacity she worked with the U.S. Environmental Protection Agency, as well as its counterpart in the Republic of Mexico, to ensure that the air and water in Southwestern Arizona remained safe while ensuring that businesses faced minimal impact.

== Political career ==
=== Arizona House Democratic Leader ===
Fernandez was elected Democratic Leader on November 8, 2018. The Arizona House Democrats defeated four Republican incumbents to bring the chamber to a 31-29 Republican majority, the smallest it's been since the 1960s.

=== Arizona House of Representatives ===
In 2012, Fernandez ran for the Arizona State House from the newly drawn 4th Legislative District. Fernandez ultimately lost in the August primary by 140 votes to Juan Carlos Escamilla. Escamilla went on to win the general election.

In May 2014, Fernandez announced her candidacy for the seat again. She won the August primary by a margin of 12.8%. The general election was unexpectedly competitive, Republican Richard Hopkins led Fernandez on election night as the heavily Republican portion of the district reported early. The next four days saw the margins go up and down, by the fifth day, with the Democratic strongholds in Pima and Yuma counties reporting, Fernandez was declared the victor by 188 votes.

In 2016, Fernandez successfully ran for re-election; she was unopposed in the general election.

In 2018, Fernandez successfully ran for re-election. She resigned on November 15, 2021 to take a position at the U.S. Department of Agriculture.

=== Vice Chair of the Arizona Democratic Party ===
In 2008, Fernandez was elected by the Arizona Democratic State Committee to be First Vice Chair of the Arizona Democratic Party, she served in this capacity until 2009.

=== Yuma Union High School Board ===
Fernandez was elected to the Yuma Union High School District Governing Board, serving as both President and Vice President.

== Arizona Legislative Career ==
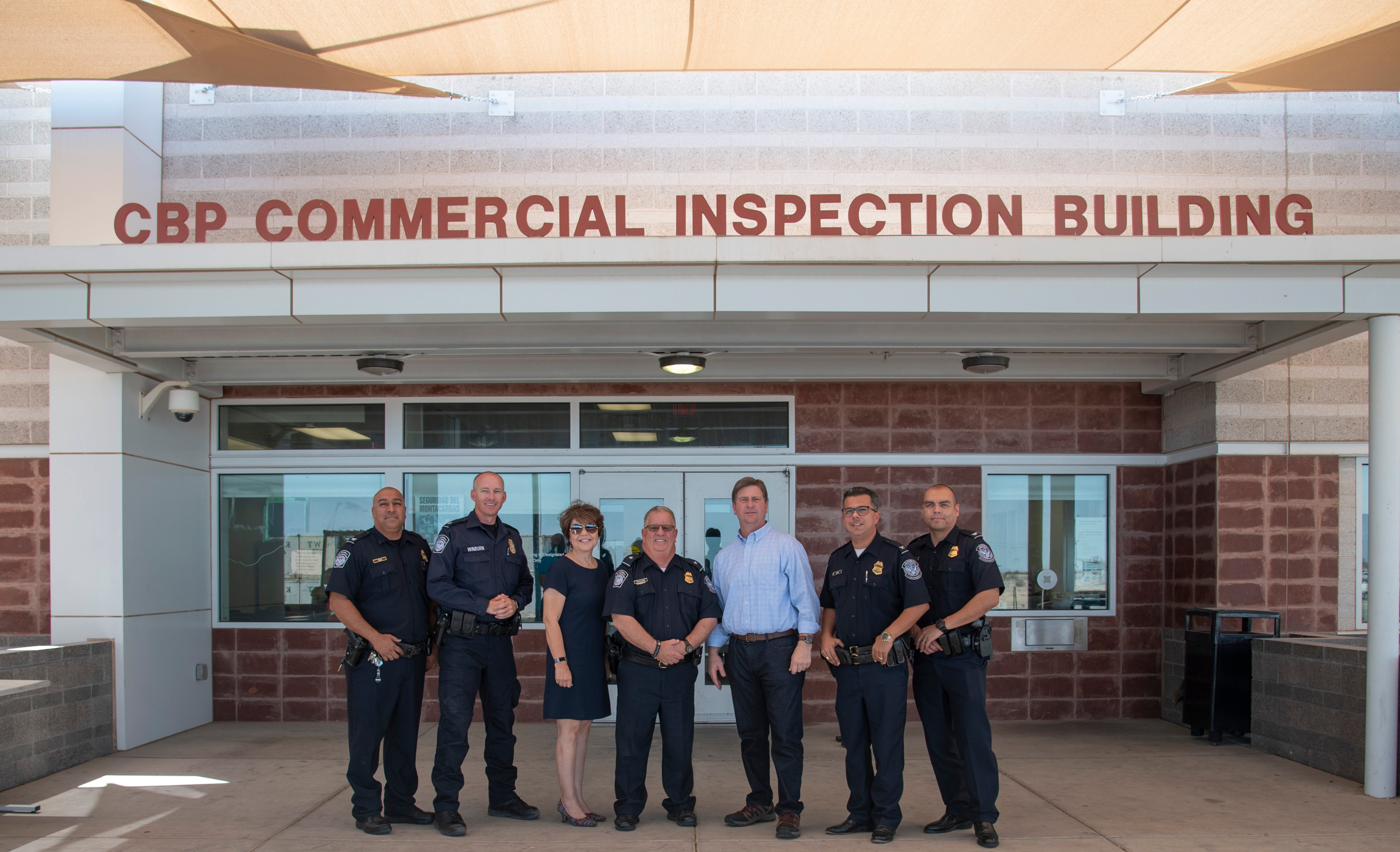
Charlene Fernandez with Greg Stanton at San Luis II Port of Entry.

=== Leadership ===
Fernandez served as the House Democratic Leader, the highest ranking Democratic member, previously having served as the House Democratic Whip.

=== Committee on Appropriations ===
In 2014, Fernandez was appointed to the coveted Committee on Appropriations, she also serves on the newly created Subcommittee on Public Safety, Infrastructure, and Resources.

- Committee on Appropriations
- Appropriations Subcommittee on Public Safety, Infrastructure, and Resources

=== Education ===
Fernandez has been very supportive of the #RedforEd movement. Speaking to reporters she called public education, "The great equalizer."

Fernandez has worked with Save Our Schools Arizona, a grassroots organization collecting signatures to refer SB1431, the ESA voucher expansion bill, to the 2018 Arizona ballot, encouraging a "No" vote. Proponents believe that SB1431 takes money away from public schools and gives it to private schools with little to no accountability and our seeking its repeal.

In 2016, Fernandez was named Legislator of Year by the Arizona Parent Teacher Association.

The Arizona Republic published a guest editorial by Fernandez in September 2015 entitled, "How I'd reform private school tax credits." In it Fernandez details her views about Arizona education funding in general and private school tuition tax credits in particular.

Fernandez was supportive of the RedForEd Teacher Walkout. Speaking to the media about the importance of treating educators fairly.

=== Volkswagen settlement ===
Fernandez supports using money from the Volkswagen emissions settlement for clean energy buses. She has argued that children are required to be in and around these buses on a daily basis and utilizing the settlement to help protect them from the harmful emissions would be a just use of the funds.

=== Gun laws ===
Fernandez has been a supporter of stricter gun control. She has been criticized for recognizing students visiting the capitol advocating for such measures.

=== Sexual harassment reporting ===
Fernandez fought her Republican colleagues who sought to limit the ability of sexual harassment and assault victims to report. Stating that, "We're blaming people."

=== LGBTQ ===
Fernandez has been an outspoken advocate of LGBT issues and helped form the Arizona State Legislature's LGBT Caucus.

=== Minimum wage ===
Fernandez was a supporter of the successful Proposition 206 which raised Arizona's minimum wage.

=== Environment ===
Fernandez called on Senator Jeff Flake to support higher ozone standards. She said, "When children have asthma, if your child stays home from school, mom and dad usually have to stay home with that child, and we're talking about productivity. If mom or dad have to take that child to urgent care, if they don't have insurance—that's dollars and cents. So this affects all of us."

=== Criminal justice ===
Fernandez has opposed the private prison system in Arizona supported by Governor Doug Ducey. She has challenged the governor's staff from her seat on the Appropriations Committee to justify the need to provide more prison beds.

=== 2016 presidential endorsement ===
Fernandez was one of the earliest to endorse Hillary Clinton for United States President. She was elected as a delegate to the Democratic National Convention in Philadelphia.

=== 2016 election lawsuit ===
Fernandez filed a declaration in support of a Plaintiffs' Motion for a preliminary injunction against the impact of HB 2023. The law, which criminalizes the activities of citizens seeking to assist those in returning early ballots who otherwise may not is still being litigated in the courts. Fernandez wrote, "The collection and personal delivery of early ballots is particularly crucial among my constituency. In areas like mine that are very rural, many voters lack home mail delivery and can have trouble receiving and mailing their early ballots.” At least one county election official, Helen Purcell, a Republican from Maricopa County, chose to not enforce the law saying, "We are not the police."

== Personal life ==
Fernandez serves or has served on the Yuma Community Foundation, Board of the United Way of Yuma County, and Yuma Leadership.

Fernandez and her husband Sergio have three adult children.

== Electoral history ==
Arizona House of Representatives District 4, General 2020 (2 Seats)
Party	Candidate	Votes	%	±%
Democratic	Charlene Fernandez	40,797	39.8	
Democratic	Geraldine Peten (inc.)	29,342	28.6	
Republican	Joel John	32,318	31.5	

Arizona House of Representatives District 4, Primary 2020 (2 Seats)
Party	Candidate	Votes	%	±%
Democratic	Charlene Fernandez (inc.)	10,161	59.4	
Democratic	Geraldine Peten (inc. )	6,944	40.6	

Arizona House of Representatives District 4, General 2018 (2 Seats)
Party	Candidate	Votes	%	±%
Democratic	Charlene Fernandez (inc.)	26,561	48.9	
Democratic	Geraldine Peten (inc.)	19,410	35.8	
Green	Sara Mae Williams	8,334	15.4	

Arizona House of Representatives District 4, Primary 2018 (2 Seats)
Party	Candidate	Votes	%	±%
Democratic	Charlene Fernandez (inc.)	9,457	62.8	
Democratic	Geraldine Peten (inc.)	5,590	37.2	

Arizona House of Representatives District 4, General 2016 (2 Seats)
Party	Candidate	Votes	%	±%
Democratic	Charlene Fernandez (inc.)	29,755	51.7	
Democratic	Jesus Rubalcava	27,794	48.3	

Arizona House of Representatives District 4, Primary 2016 (2 Seats)
Party	Candidate	Votes	%	±%
Democratic	Charlene Fernandez (inc.)	6,623	53.9	
Democratic	Jesus Rubalcava	5,673	46.1	

Arizona House of Representatives District 4, General 2014 (2 Seats)
Party	Candidate	Votes	%	±%
Democratic	Charlene Fernandez	12,251	32.5	
Democratic	Lisa Otondo (inc.)	13,324	35.4	
Republican	Richard Hopkins	12,063	32.1	

Arizona House of Representatives District 4, Primary 2014 (2 Seats)
Party	Candidate	Votes	%	±%
Democratic	Charlene Fernandez	4,497	37.7	
Democratic	Lisa Otondo (inc.)	4,556	38.2	
Democratic	Jose Suarez	2,861	24.0	

Arizona House of Representatives District 4, Primary 2012 (2 Seats)
Party	Candidate	Votes	%	±%
Democratic	Charlene Fernandez	3,865	31.8	
Democratic	Lisa Otondo	4,238	34.9	
Democratic	Juan Carlos "J.C." Escamilla	4,038	33.3	

=== Non-partisan elections ===
Yuma Union High School District #70 General Election, 2008 Non-Partisan (3 Seats)
Candidate	Votes	%
Charlene Fernandez (inc.)	13,893	18.7
Bruce Gwynn (inc.)	16,123	21.7
Dan Farar	13,559	18.2

Yuma Union High School District #70 General Election, 2004 Non-Partisan (3 Seats)
Candidate	Votes	%
Charlene Fernandez	13,646	20.5
Robert Brown	14,602	22.0
Sally Doyle (inc.)	17,322	26.1
George Munoz	12,842	19.3
Bernadette Presloid	7,851	11.8

Arizona House of Representatives
Preceded by Rebecca Rios	Minority Leader of the Arizona House of Representatives; 2019–2021	Succeeded by Reginald Bolding
Party political offices
Preceded by Kim Khoury; Acting	Chair of the Arizona Democratic Party; 2025–present	Incumbent
