= AACO =

AACO may refer to:

- Arab Air Carriers' Organization, a regional trade organization of Arab airlines established in 1965 by the League of Arab States
- Australian Agricultural Company, a company which serves to improve beef cattle production through responsible natural resource and land use
- Arizona Association of Counties, a member association for all elected officials of Arizona's 15 counties
- An initialization for Anne Arundel County, Maryland
