= Aaron Lieberman =

American politician

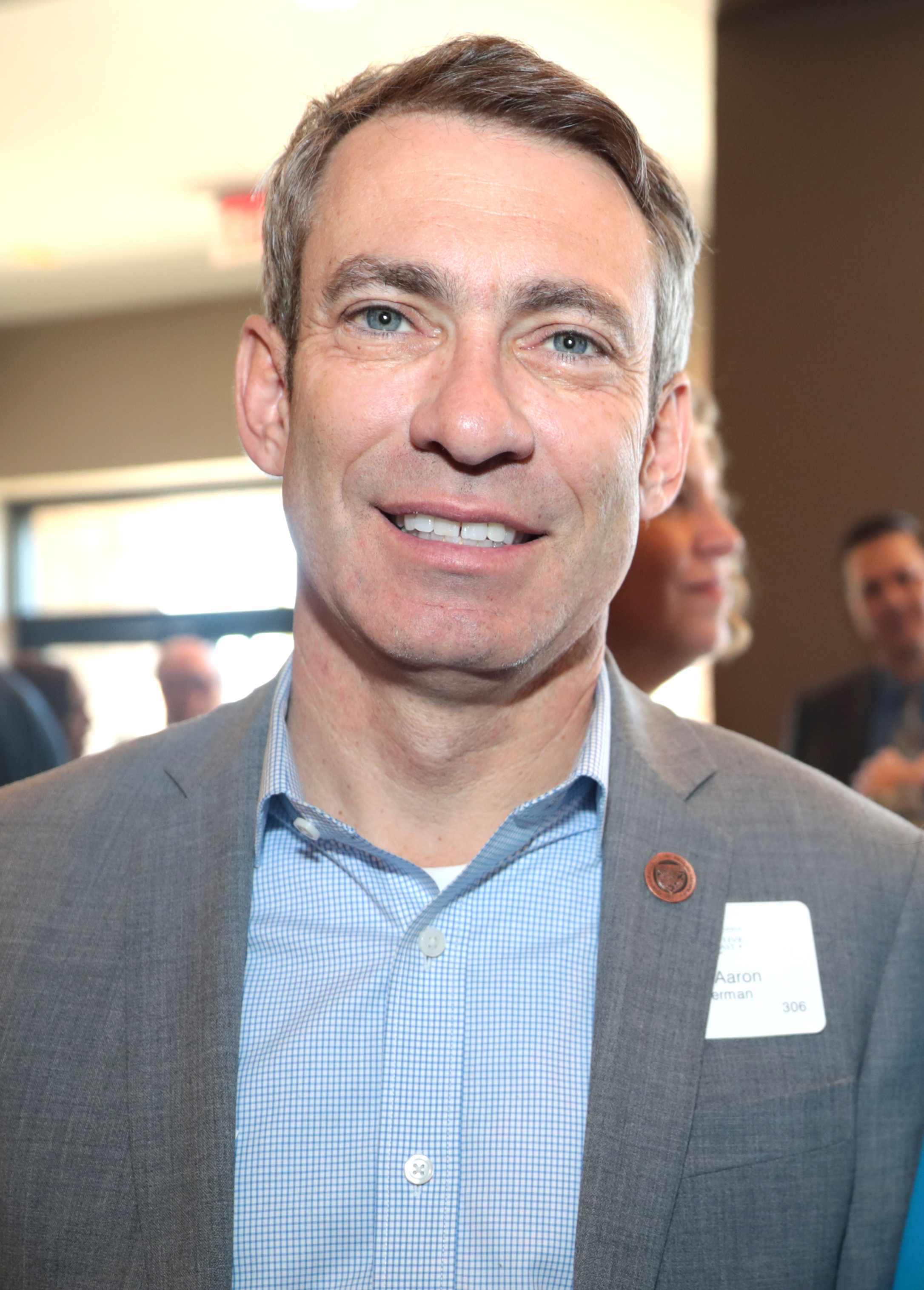
- Lieberman in 2020

Member of the Arizona House of Representatives from the 28th district
- In office January 14, 2019 – September 20, 2021
- Preceded by: Maria Syms
- Succeeded by: Sarah Liguori

Personal details
- Party: Democratic
- Education: Yale University

Aaron Lieberman is an American politician who served as an Arizona State Representative for the 28th district from 2019 to 2021. A member of the Democratic Party, he resigned from office to run for Governor of Arizona in 2022.

== Early life, education, and career ==
Lieberman was born in Tempe, Arizona, and raised in Phoenix. He studied at Yale University before founding Jumpstart, an education nonprofit, and Acelero Learning. In 2015, Lieberman returned to Arizona, becoming a philanthropist and the CEO of a surgery center in Phoenix.

== Politics ==
During the 2018 elections, Lieberman defeated incumbent Republican State Representative Maria Syms in Arizona's 28th legislative district, a Phoenix-area seat.

=== 2022 Arizona gubernatorial election ===
In June 2021, Lieberman announced that he would run for Governor of Arizona in next year's election. He resigned from the House in September. Throughout the campaign, Lieberman trailed fellow candidate Katie Hobbs. He dropped out of the race on May 27, 2022, pledging to support a Democratic candidate.
