= Brian Fernandez (politician) =

American politician (born 1977)

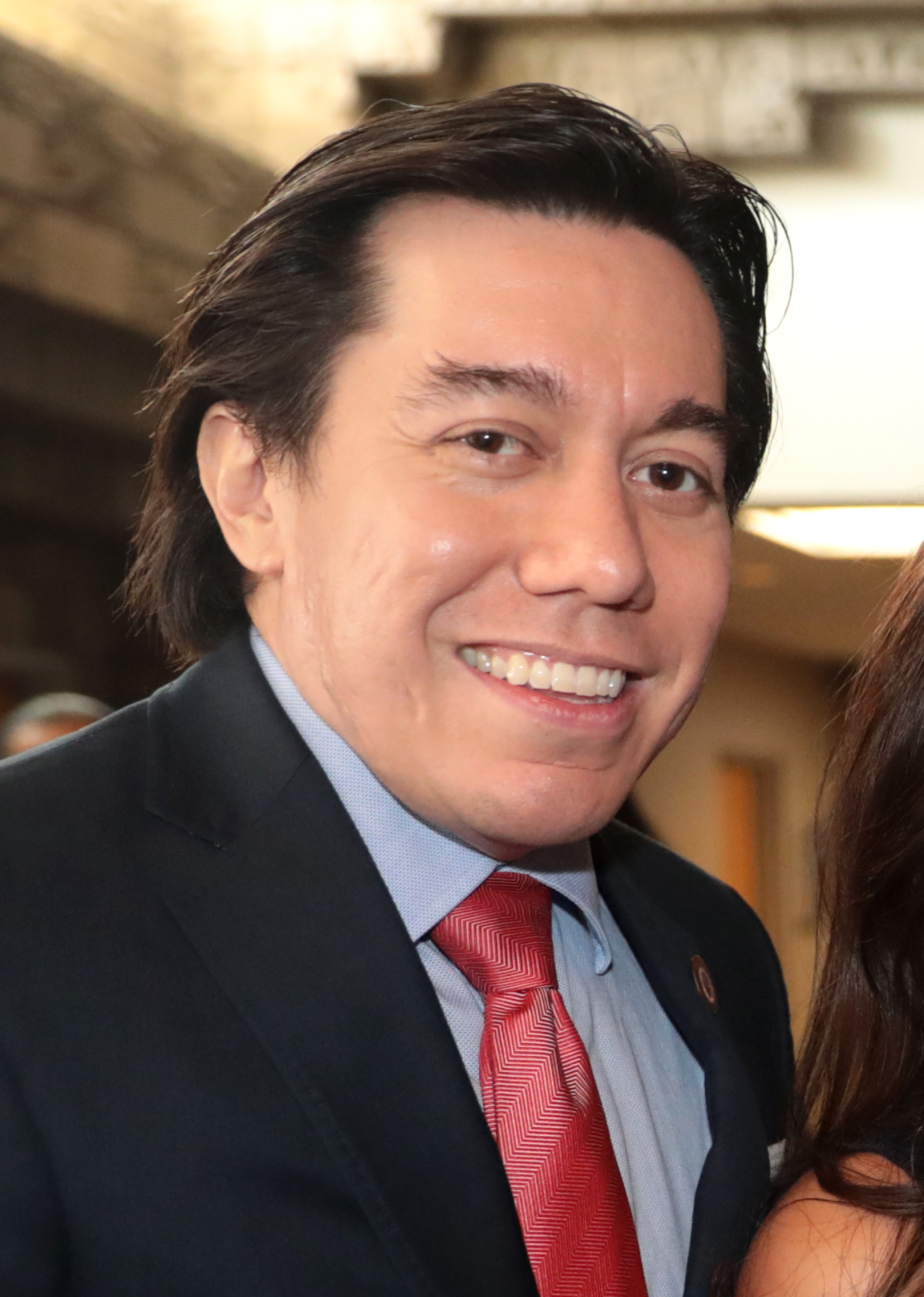
- Fernandez in 2022

Member of the Arizona Senate from the 23rd district
- Incumbent
- Assumed office January 9, 2023
- Preceded by: Michelle Ugenti-Rita

Member of the Arizona House of Representatives from the 4th district
- In office November 23, 2021 – January 9, 2023 Serving with Mariana Sandoval
- Preceded by: Charlene Fernandez
- Succeeded by: Laura Terech

Personal details
- Born: August 23, 1977 (age 49) Yuma, Arizona, U.S.
- Party: Democratic
- Education: Arizona State University (BA)

Brian Fernandez is an American politician serving as a member of the Arizona Senate for the 23rd legislative district. He previously served in the Arizona House of Representatives for the 4th legislative district beginning in 2021, after being appointed to the seat vacated by his mother, Charlene Fernandez, who resigned to become Director of Rural Development for the United States Department of Agriculture. He is a member of the Democratic Party.

== Early life and education ==
Fernandez was born in Yuma, Arizona to Sergio and Charlene Fernandez. He attended Yuma High School and graduated from Arizona State University with a bachelor's degree.

== Career ==
Fernandez volunteered on the political campaigns of former Governor Janet Napolitano and U.S. Representatives Raúl Grijalva and Ed Pastor. He also worked for U.S. Senator Byron Dorgan and the Congressional Black Caucus.

Fernandez later co-founded Symfodium, a company building customer relationship management software for members of Congress. He also founded Team Start, a software startup operating in Arizona and Mexico City.

== Political career ==
=== Arizona House of Representatives ===
In November 2021, his mother, Arizona House Democratic Leader Charlene Fernandez, resigned to take a position at the United States Department of Agriculture. On November 22, 2021, the Yuma County Board of Supervisors appointed Brian Fernandez to complete her term representing the 4th Legislative District. During his tenure, he served on the Committee on Transportation and the Committee on Land, Agriculture & Rural Affairs.

=== Arizona Senate ===
Fernandez ran for the seat left open by the retirement of Senator Lisa Otondo. He was uncontested in the primary and won the general election by over 7 points against the Republican candidate Gary Snyder.

Fernandez was appointed to the Committee on Appropriations, the Committee on Environment, the Committee on Finance, the Committee on Natural Resources and Water and the Joint Legislative Budget Committee.

Governor Katie Hobbs appointed Fernandez to the Governor’s Independent Prison Oversight Commission.

== Arizona Legislative Career ==
At a Yuma town hall in September 2022, Senator Sine Kerr credited Fernandez for securing $5 million in funding for the Northern Arizona University Yuma campus to expand bachelor’s degree programs. She also praised his work to obtain a $35 million expansion and modernization project for Cesar Chavez Boulevard in San Luis.

== Electoral history ==
Arizona House of Representatives District 23, General 2024
Party	Candidate	Votes	%	±%
Democratic	Brian Fernandez	42,658	53.82	
Republican	Michelle Altherr	36,602	46.18	

Arizona House of Representatives District 23, Primary 2024
Party	Candidate	Votes	%	±%
Democratic	Brian Fernandez	6,943	60.35	
Democratic	Jesus Lugo, Jr.	4,562	39.65	

Arizona House of Representatives District 23, General 2022
Party	Candidate	Votes	%	±%
Democratic	Brian Fernandez	29,175	53.7	
Republican	Gary Snyder	25,194	46.3	

Arizona House of Representatives District 23, Primary 2022
Party	Candidate	Votes	%	±%
Democratic	Brian Fernandez	13,365	100	
