= Eric Meyer (politician) =

American politician (born 1961)

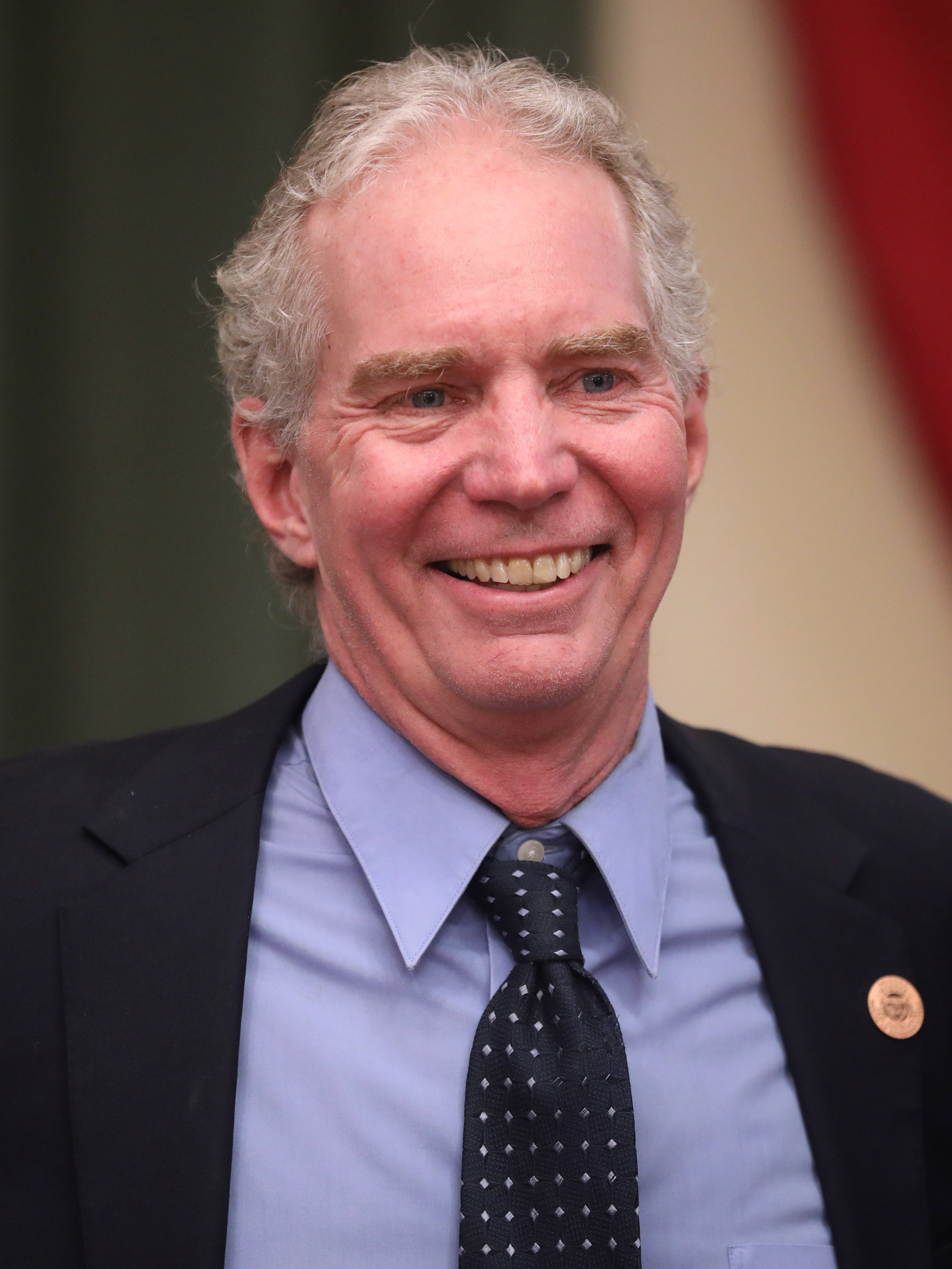
- Meyer in 2024

Member of the Arizona House of Representatives
- In office August 16, 2024 – January 13, 2025 Serving with Matt Gress
- Preceded by: Laura Terech
- Succeeded by: Pamela Carter
- Constituency: 4th district
- In office 2009 – January 9, 2017
- Preceded by: David Funkhouser
- Succeeded by: Kelli Butler
- Constituency: 11th district (2009–2013); 28th district (2013–2017)

Personal details
- Born: 1961 (age 64–65)
- Party: Democratic
- Spouse: Sarah Snell
- Children: 2
- Education: University of Southern California; University of Arizona
- Occupation: Physician
- Website: EricForAZ.com

Eric Meyer (born 1961) is a former member of the Arizona House of Representatives from the 4th legislative district. He previously served in the legislature for four consecutive two-year terms following his first election in 2008 and served as Minority Leader from 2014 until 2016. Prior to becoming politically active, Meyer was Director of Emergency Medicine at Providence Medical Center in Portland, Oregon.

== Early life and education ==
Eric Meyer was born in August, 1961. Meyer attended public schools in Scottsdale, AZ starting at Cocopah Elementary School and graduating high school in 1979 from Chaparral High School,. He earned a bachelor's degree in Economics from the University of Southern California. Discovering his passion for medicine while working at a neighborhood clinic, he returned to Arizona to pursue his medical degree from University of Arizona Medical School.

Eric met his wife Sarah Snell while attending medical school and both earned their Medical Doctorates in 1988. During medical school, the couple spent two months working in the field in New Guinea where they witnessed third-world medicine and the violence of tribal warfare first-hand. The two were married shortly after graduation in May 1988. Meyer's post-graduate training was in Emergency Medicine at Oregon Health Sciences University and afterwards practiced as an Emergency Medicine Physician at Providence Medical Center in Portland, Oregon. Meyer's daughter, Sophie, was born in 1994 and his son, Clay, was born in 1996. Snell specializes in Obstetrics and Gynecology at Scottsdale Healthcare Shea Medical Center. His daughter, Sophie Meyer, earned her undergraduate degree in Physics Engineering and is pursuing her master's degree in Material Engineering at Stanford University. His son, Clay Meyer, is studying for his undergraduate degree in Environmental Engineering at Stanford University.

== Career ==
Meyer served as Director of Emergency Medicine at Providence Medical Center until returning to Arizona in late 1996. Meyer moved back to Arizona where Sarah began practicing medicine at Mayo Clinic. Meyer spent the following year remodeling their newly purchased home in Paradise Valley, AZ and taking care of their two young children. When his daughter Sophie was 3 years old she was enrolled in pre-school at the Unitarian Universalist Congregation of Phoenix and Meyer joined the board of the program.

When his children entered public school, Meyer joined the board of the Scottsdale Parent Council. Shortly afterwards he began his involvement in legislative politics while serving as Legislative Liaison for the organization. As his kids continued to progress through the Scottsdale, AZ public education system, Meyer continued to scale up his involvement, eventually running for and winning a seat on the Scottsdale School Board in 2004 where he served for eight years.

In addition to his work within his children's schools, Meyer served on the Children's Museum of Phoenix Board of Directors, as PTO President for Arcadia Neighborhood Learning Center, and as a member of the Budget Committee for the Scottsdale Unified School District.

Meyer ran and won as a write-in candidate during the 2008 Democratic Primary Election for Arizona State Representative in District 11. He went on to win the general election and first assumed office in 2009. Meyer has been an outspoken supporter of restoring public education funds which were severely cut in Arizona following the Great Recession. Re-elected three times since, Meyer was nominated as Democratic Leader by his Caucus in 2014. He has served on Government, Transportation, and Education committees in previous legislative sessions and currently serves on both the Health and Appropriations committees.

After reaching his term limit in the Arizona House of Representatives, Meyer announced his run for Arizona State Senate in the 2016 general election on October 6, 2016.

In August 2024, Meyer was appointed to a new term in the Arizona House, replacing Laura Terech in the 4th legislative district.

== Political statements ==
=== Education ===
"Investing in our kids must be our state's first priority. Since the beginning of the recession, our state legislature has cut billions from our public schools, resulting in a serious teacher shortage and some of the largest class sizes in the nation. Funding for our state universities has been reduced, resulting in tuition hikes of over 80%, and funding has been eliminated for community colleges in Maricopa and Pima Counties.

"With two terms on the Scottsdale School Board and my eight years as a State Representative, I have been an effective voice for our children. I will continue to advocate for the restoration of funding for education -- without raising taxes -- and I will continue to work to ensure that more students graduate from high school with access to higher education and quality jobs right here in Arizona."

=== Economic development ===
"We must continue to diversify our economy. I am an advocate for economic sectors that have sustainable, long-term potential, such as high-tech and biotech businesses. Our universities must remain world-class centers for research that also prepare our students for 21st Century jobs; only with an educated workforce, will companies choose to relocate here. As our economy continues to recover, we must invest in Arizona's infrastructure, which will help to promote economic development in all parts of our state, and develop innovative job training programs for Arizonans of all ages. I support improved access in our schools and universities to STEM classes in science, technology, engineering, and math, and I support both tax incentives for targeted research and development, and investments in renewable sources of energy."

=== Healthcare ===
Meyer has outlined the following stance on healthcare: "I am an advocate for quality, affordable healthcare for all Arizonans. As an experienced ER physician and Director of Emergency Medicine I know how to be cost-effective in managing healthcare. As a physician in the Legislature and having served as the ranking member of the Health Committee, I have brought my medical experience to the Capitol. My responsibility in helping to set scope of practice guidelines and making safety decisions that impact healthcare workers across our state is one I have taken very seriously. Arizona is facing a physician shortage in the midst of growing healthcare demands and I will advocate for new policies that will help retain graduate medical professionals in our state. I will also continue to represent your interests on issues as varied as concussion awareness, public health policy, and hospital mergers."

=== Government transparency ===
Meyer has outlined the following stance on transparency: "I have introduced legislation the last several sessions that would ban all gifts by lobbyists to Arizona's elected officials. No more free trips. No more free tickets. No more free lunches. Our votes shouldn't be for sale. I believe that all politicians should report all political contributions and their sources. I am opposed to so-called "dark money." We need transparency in who is donating how much to whose campaign. It's time we take back the power from out-of-state special interest groups and put it back in the hands of Arizona's citizens."

== Electoral history ==
- 2008 After winning the Democratic Primary as a write-in candidate, Meyer went on to be elected as Arizona State Representative for Arizona's 11th House District.
- 2010 In 2010 Meyer won re-election to the 11th District seat after being unchallenged in the 2010 primary election.
- 2012 After statewide redistricting, Meyer won re-election in the 2012 election for Arizona House of Representatives District 28. He ran unopposed in the Democratic primary of August 28, 2012 and won the general election on November 6, 2012.
- 2014 Meyer was unopposed in the Democratic primary and was elected for his fourth term to the legislature in the general election on November 4, 2014.
- 2016 With incumbent Adam Driggs retiring, Meyer ran for the open LD 28 state senate seat, losing in the general election to Kate Brophy McGee.
