= Pamela Carter =

Pamela Carter may refer to:

- Pamela Carter (Indiana politician)
- Pamela Carter (Arizona politician)
