= Arizona's 23rd legislative district =

American legislative district

- Map of District 23: Approved January 21, 2022
- Senator: Brian Fernandez (D)
- House members: Mariana Sandoval (D); Michele Pena (R)
- Registration: 33.24% Democratic; 25.90% Republican; 39.36% Other
- Demographics: 25% White; 4% Black/African American; 5% Native American; 2% Asian; 62% Hispanic
- Population: 232,246
- Voting-age population: 169,035
- Registered voters: 121,771

Arizona's 23rd legislative district is one of 30 in the state, consisting of sections of Maricopa County, Pima County, Pinal County, and Yuma County. As of 2023, there are 65 precincts in the district, with a total registered voter population of 121,771. The district has an overall population of 232,246.

Following the 2020 United States redistricting cycle, the Arizona Independent Redistricting Commission (AIRC) redrew legislative district boundaries in Arizona. The 23rd district was drawn as a majority Latino constituency, with 62% of residents being Hispanic or Latino. According to the AIRC, the district is outside of competitive range and considered leaning Democratic. Despite the AIRC's characterization of the district's politics, Republican Michele Pena won the second House of Representatives seat for the district in 2022.

== Political representation ==
The district is represented in the 56th Arizona State Legislature, which convenes from January 1, 2023, to December 31, 2024, by Brian Fernandez (D-Yuma) in the Arizona Senate and by Mariana Sandoval (D-Goodyear) and Michele Pena (R-Yuma) in the Arizona House of Representatives.

Name	Image	Residence	Office	Party
Brian Fernandez		Yuma	State senator	Democrat
Mariana Sandoval		Goodyear	State representative	Democrat
Michele Pena		Yuma	State representative	Republican

== Election results ==
The 2022 elections were the first in the newly drawn district.

=== Arizona Senate ===
2022 Arizona's 23rd Senate district election
Party	Candidate	Votes	%
Democratic	Brian Fernandez	29,175	53.66
Republican	Gary Garcia Snyder	25,194	46.34
Total votes		54,369	100.00
Democratic hold			

=== Arizona House of Representatives ===
2022 Arizona House of Representatives election, 23rd district
Party	Candidate	Votes	%
Democratic	Mariana Sandoval	26,986	36.25
Republican	Michele Pena	25,268	33.94
Democratic	Jesús Lugo Jr.	22,191	29.81
Total votes		74,445	100.00
Democratic hold			
Republican gain from Democratic			

== See also ==
- List of Arizona legislative districts
- Arizona State Legislature
