= Joel John =

American politician

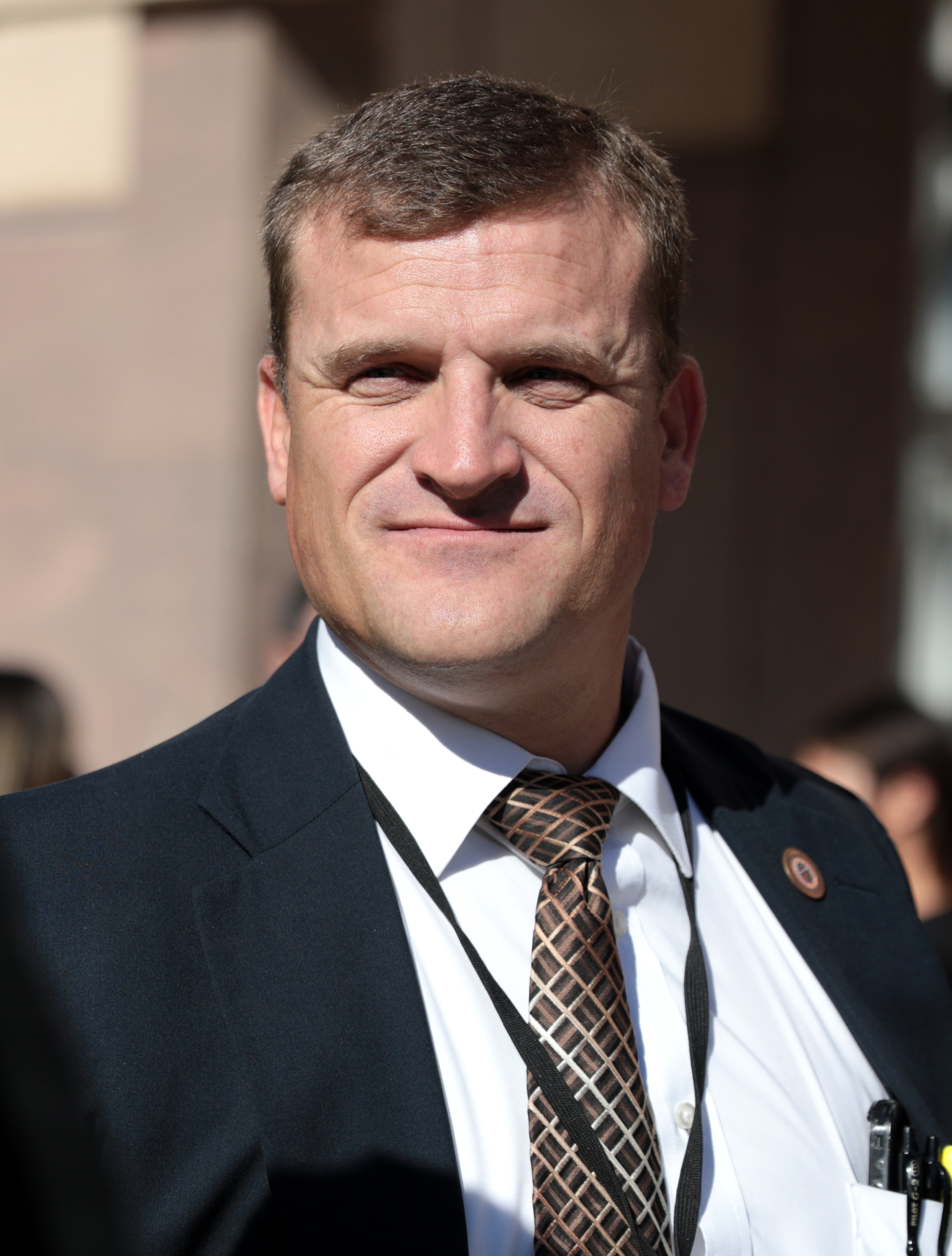
- John in 2022

Member of the Arizona House of Representatives from the 4th District
- In office January 11, 2021 – January 9, 2023 Serving with Brian Fernandez
- Preceded by: Geraldine Peten
- Succeeded by: Matt Gress

Personal details
- Born: Buckeye, Arizona
- Party: Republican

Joel John is an American politician and former member of the Arizona House of Representatives. A member of the Arizona Republican Party, he served alongside Democrat Brian Fernandez in Arizona's 4th legislative district.

== Career ==
John was born and raised in Buckeye, Arizona. He comes from a family of farmers who have been in Arizona since the late 1800s, and in the Buckeye region since the 1950s. Before his legislative career, John was a music teacher at Buckeye Elementary School. As a first-time candidate in 2020, John won his seat after placing second in the district's general election, thereby defeating Democratic incumbent Geraldine Peten. In 2022, he was defeated in the Republican primary by Michael Carbone.
