= Adam Driggs =

American lawyer, politician, and judge

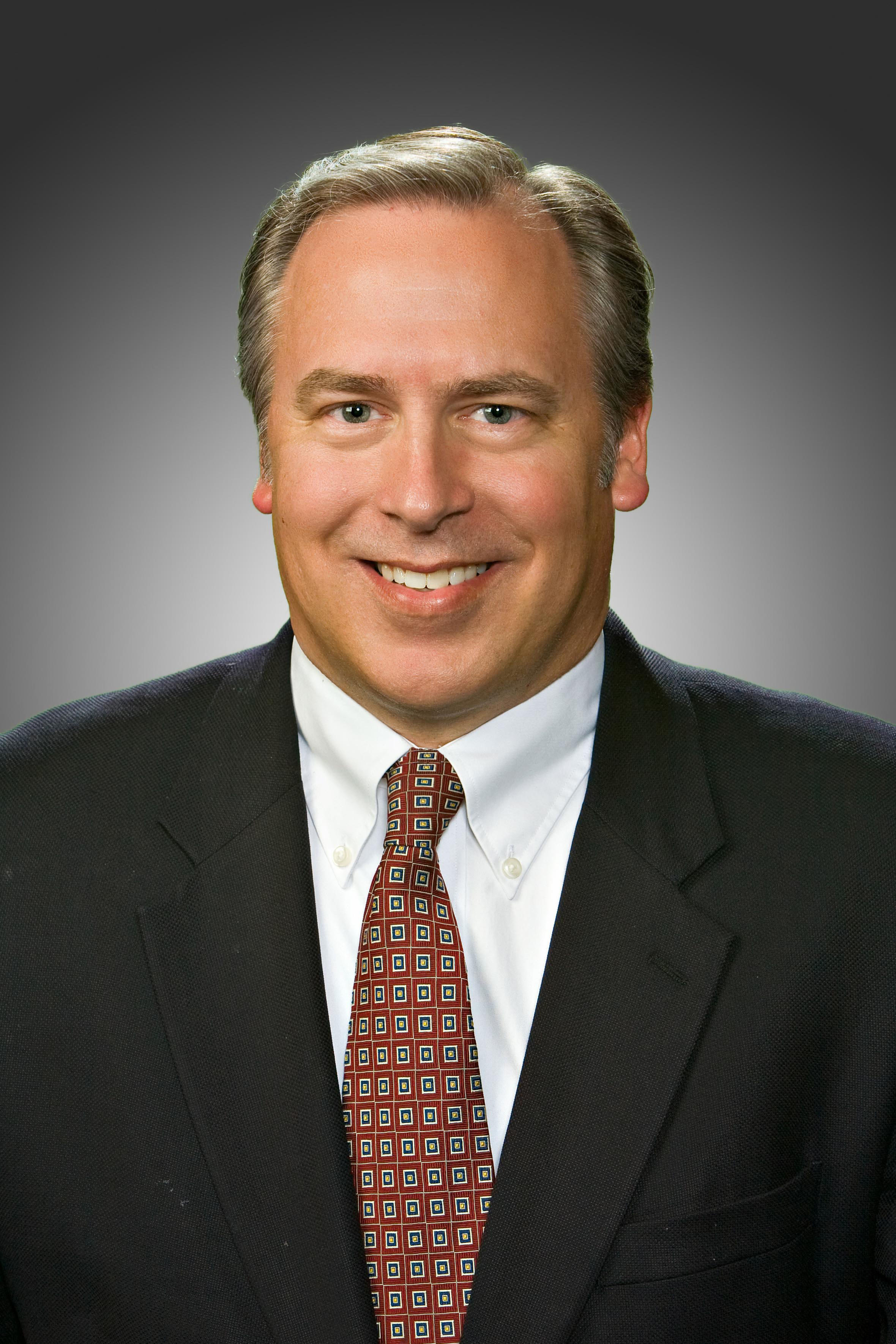

Judge of the Maricopa County Superior Court
- Incumbent
- Assumed office February 2017
- Appointed by: Doug Ducey

Member of the Arizona Senate from the 28th district
- In office January 10, 2011 – January 9, 2017
- Preceded by: Barbara Leff
- Succeeded by: Kate Brophy McGee

Member of the Arizona House of Representatives from the 11th district
- In office January 2, 2006 – January 10, 2011
- Succeeded by: Kate Brophy McGee

Personal details
- Born: Adam Dorsey Driggs; April 22, 1965 (age 61) Phoenix, Arizona, U.S.
- Party: Republican
- Spouse: Leonore Driggs
- Children: 5
- Parent: John D. Driggs (father)
- Education: Brigham Young University (BA); Arizona State University (JD)

Adam Dorsey Driggs (born April 22, 1965) is an American attorney, politician, and as of 2017, a judge of the Maricopa County Superior Court in Arizona. Driggs previously served in both chambers of the Arizona State Legislature.

== Early life and education ==
Born in Phoenix, Arizona, Driggs is the son of John D. Driggs. He has five siblings. He earned a Bachelor of Arts degree in economics from Brigham Young University in 1990 and a Juris Doctor from Sandra Day O'Connor College of Law in 1993.

== Career ==
In 1995, in his first trial after passing the bar, Driggs represented Olympic athlete Ime Akpan in her appeal against the International Amateur Athletics Federation represented by David Pannick, Baron Pannick QC.

Driggs has been a small business owner since 1997. He was a prosecutor for Maricopa County Attorney's Office from 1995 to 1997. He was also a clerk at a law firm in Rio de Janeiro, Brazil and later was an Attorney at Driggs Law Group. In February 2017, Driggs was appointed as a judge to the Maricopa County Superior Court.

Driggs was the recipient of the 2010 Legislator of the Year Award from the Arizona Chamber of Commerce and Industry. He was also chosen as the 2015 Arizona Capitol Times "Best Republican Senator" in their annual awards presentation.

== Personal life ==
Driggs and his wife, Leonore, have five children. Lenore Driggs is a justice of the peace for the Arcadia district in Phoenix.

== Elections ==
- 2014 Incumbent Driggs was unopposed in the Republican primary. Driggs defeated Democrat Kelli Butler and Libertarian Jim Iannuzo in the general election.
- 2012 Incumbent Driggs was unopposed in the Republican primary. Driggs defeated Democrat Eric Shelley in the general election.
- 2010 Driggs ran for the State Senate and defeated Rich Davis and Andrew Smigielski in the Republican primary and then defeated Democrat Rita Dickinson in the November 2 general election.
- 2008 Driggs and Democrat Eric Meyer were elected to the 11th District Seat in the Arizona House of Representatives, defeating Republican Jon Altmann.
- 2006 Driggs and Don Hesselbrock defeated incumbent John Allen in an upset in the Republican primary. In a second upset, Driggs and Democrat Mark Anthony Desimone defeated Hesselbrock in the general election.
