= Kate Brophy McGee =

Arizona politician

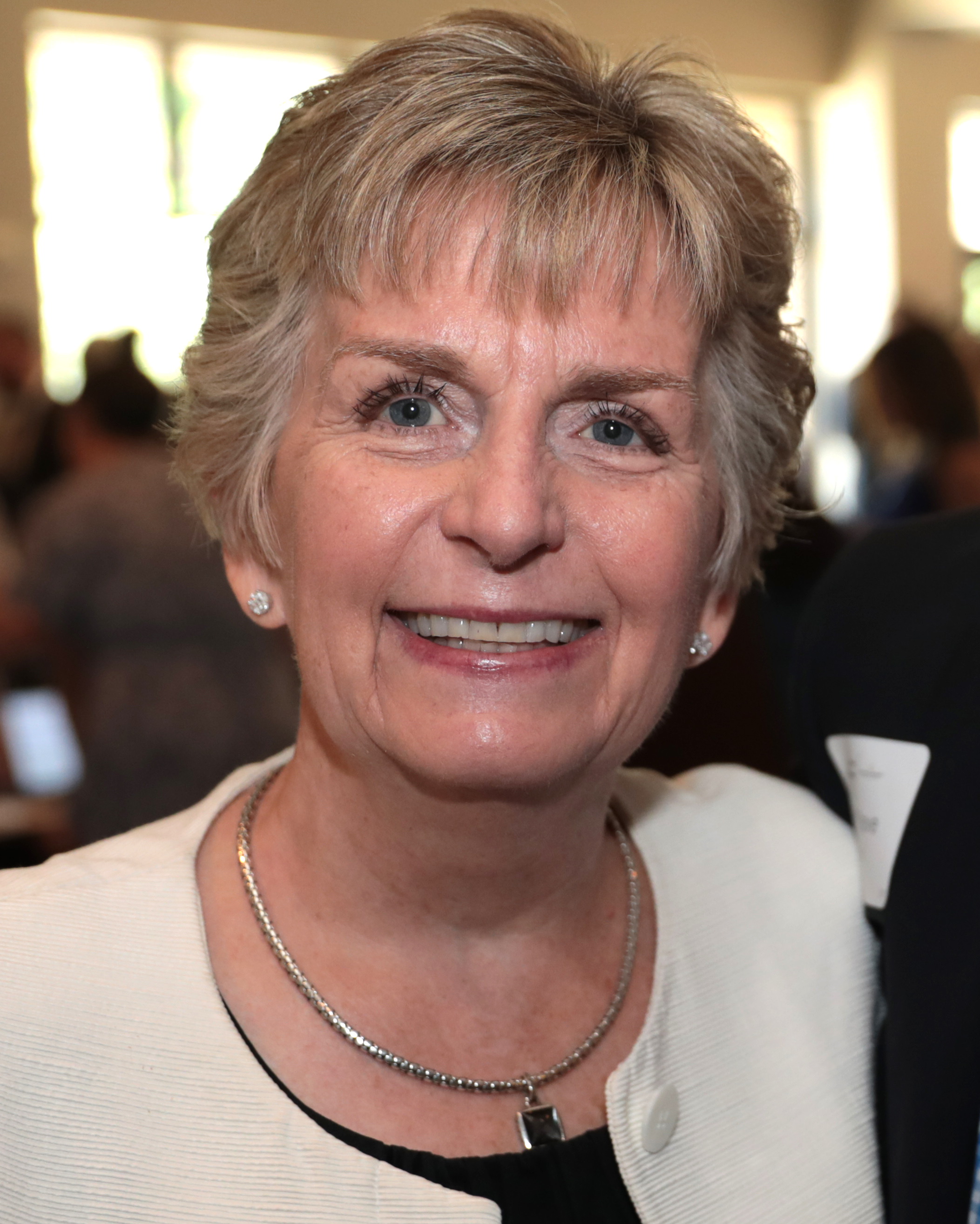
- Brophy McGee in 2019

Member of the Maricopa County Board of Supervisors from the 3rd district
- Incumbent
- Assumed office January 6, 2025
- Preceded by: Bill Gates

Member of the Arizona Senate from the 28th district
- In office January 9, 2017 – January 11, 2021
- Preceded by: Adam Driggs
- Succeeded by: Christine Marsh

Member of the Arizona House of Representatives
- In office January 10, 2011 – January 9, 2017 Serving with Eric Meyer (2011–2013)
- Preceded by: Adam Driggs
- Succeeded by: Maria Syms
- Constituency: 11th district (2011–2013); 28th district (2013–2017)

Personal details
- Born: Arizona
- Party: Republican
- Education: University of Arizona
- Website: katemcgee.com

Kate Brophy McGee (born in Arizona) is an American politician serving on the Maricopa County Board of Supervisors, representing the 3rd district. She previously served as a Republican member of the Arizona Senate representing District 28 from 2017 to 2021. Brophy McGee previously served in the Arizona House of Representatives.

== Education ==
Brophy McGee graduated from the University of Arizona.

== Political positions ==
Kate Brophy McGee has described herself as a moderate Republican. After winning re-election in 2018, she emphasized that her political agenda was "moderation." McGee has a 68% lifetime conservative rating from the American Conservative Union, a 54% rating from the fiscally conservative Arizona Chapter of Americans for Prosperity and she has an 86% rating from the socially conservative group, Center for Arizona Policy; she had a 53% grade in 2018 from the NRA Political Victory Fund (NRA). Planned Parenthood, which supports abortion rights, gave her a 50% rating while NARAL Pro-Choice America, which also supports abortion rights, gave her a 0% rating. She received a 42% rating, lower than most Democrats but higher than most Republicans, from the Arizona Education Association as well as a 67% rating from the animal rights group, Humane Voters of Arizona, and a 0% from the Sierra Club, an environmentalist advocacy group.

=== Legislative record ===
She was the only Republican who voted with Democrats against a bill to require women be asked more specific questions before an abortion. McGee also joined Democrats to oppose expanding the voucher system for private schools. In 2018, she co-sponsored a bill to ban conversion therapy from being used on minors. In May 2019, she was one of two Republicans in the State Senate who voted against a bill to fund crisis pregnancy centers and to prohibit giving referrals to clinics that offer abortion.

According to a study pulled by the Arizona Center for Investigative Reporting, McGee voted with a majority of Democrats 52% of the time, but she still voted more often with her own party.

== Elections ==
- 2018: McGee won re-election by a slim margin in a tightly contested race.
- 2012: Redistricted to District 28 with Democratic incumbent Representative Eric Meyer, incumbent Republican Representative Amanda Reeve redistricted from District 6, and with incumbent Democratic Representatives Steve Farley running for Arizona Senate and Bruce Wheeler redistricted to District 10, Brophy McGee and Reeve were unopposed for the August 28, 2012 Republican Primary; Brophy McGee placed first with 17,971 votes, and Representative Reeve placed second. Brophy McGee and Representative Meyer won the four-way November 6, 2012 General election, with Brophy McGee taking the first seat with 46,225 votes and Democratic Representative Meyer taking the second seat ahead of Representative Reeve and Libertarian James Ianuzzo, a perennial candidate who had run for House seats in 2004, 2006, 2008, and 2010.
- 2010: When Republican Representative Adam Driggs ran for Arizona Senate and left the District 11 seat open, Brophy McGee ran in the five-way August 24, 2010 Republican Primary, placing first with 11,155 votes; in the three-way November 2, 2010 General election, Brophy McGee took the first seat with 32,589 votes, and incumbent Democratic Representative Eric Meyer took the second seat ahead of Republican nominee Eric West.
