= Geraldine Peten =

American politician (1947–2023)

Member of the Arizona House of Representatives from the 4th district
- In office August 16, 2017 – January 11, 2021
- Preceded by: Jesus Rubalcava
- Succeeded by: Joel John

Personal details
- Born: December 14, 1947
- Died: December 13, 2023 (aged 75)
- Party: Democratic

Geraldine Peten (December 14, 1947 – December 13, 2023) was an American politician who served in the Arizona House of Representatives, representing District 4. She was appointed by the Maricopa County Board of Supervisors in 2017 to replace former representative Jesus Rubalcava. Peten was a Democrat and was the seatmate of the Democratic Leader of the Arizona House of Representatives Charlene Fernandez.

The Arizona Capitol Times interviewed her in August 2017. An educator, she was African American.

Peten died on December 13, 2023, just one day shy of turning 76.

== Electoral history ==
Arizona House of Representatives District 4, Primary 2020 (2 Seats)
Party	Candidate	Votes	%	±%
Democratic	Charlene Fernandez (inc.)	10,161	59.4	
Democratic	Geraldine Peten (inc. )	6,944	40.6	

Arizona House of Representatives District 4, General 2018 (2 Seats)
Party	Candidate	Votes	%	±%
Democratic	Charlene Fernandez (inc.)	26,561	48.9	
Democratic	Geraldine Peten (inc.)	19,410	35.8	
Green	Sara Mae Williams	8,334	15.3	

Arizona House of Representatives District 4, Primary 2018 (2 Seats)
Party	Candidate	Votes	%	±%
Democratic	Charlene Fernandez (inc.)	9,457	62.8	
Democratic	Geraldine Peten (inc.)	5,590	37.2	
