= Matt Gress =

American politician (born 1988)

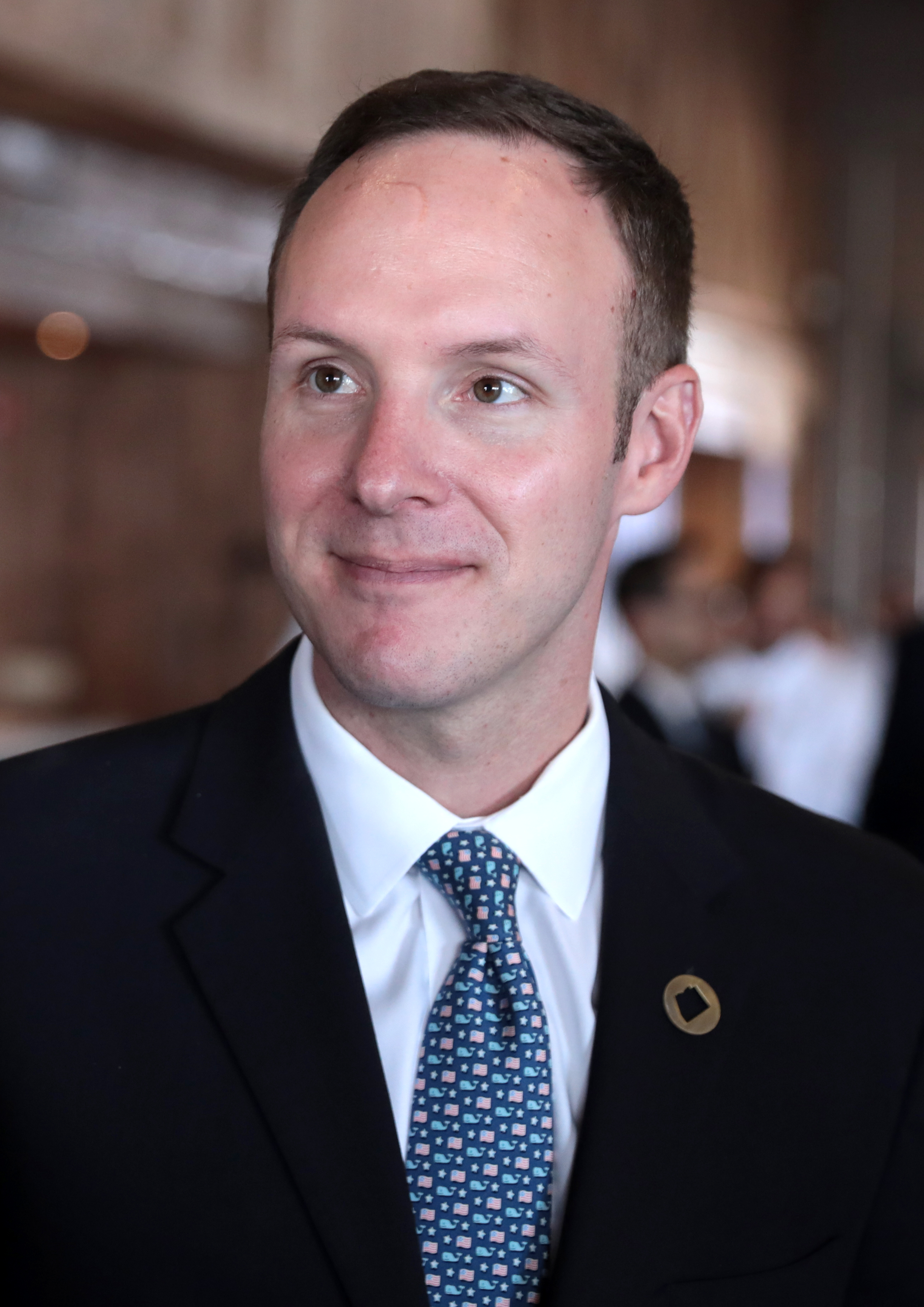
- Gress in 2022

Member of the Arizona House of Representatives from the 4th district
- Incumbent
- Assumed office January 9, 2023 Serving with Pamela Carter
- Preceded by: Joel John
- Succeeded by: Tammy Caputi (elect)

Personal details
- Born: Matthew Owen Gress; July 8, 1988 (age 38) Oklahoma, U.S.
- Party: Republican
- Education: University of Oklahoma (BA); Syracuse University (MPA)
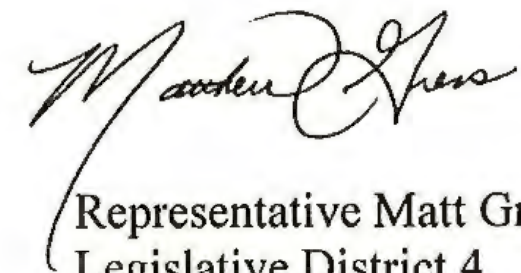
- Signature
- Website: Campaign website

Matthew Owen Gress (born July 8, 1988) is an American politician and Republican member of the Arizona House of Representatives elected to represent District 4 in 2022.

== Early career and education ==
Gress grew up in rural Oklahoma in a trailer park, the youngest of four children of a divorced mother, and graduated from the University of Oklahoma, where he was selected for the Harry S. Truman Scholarship. Gress was accepted into the Teach for America program, and he gained certification to teach in English, history, government and economics. He also received his master's degree from Syracuse University.

In Arizona, Gress worked as an analyst for the non-partisan Joint Legislative Budget Committee, and later as Director of the Governor's Office of Strategic Planning and Budgeting, under former Governor Doug Ducey. From 2017 until 2021, Gress served as a governing board member in the Madison Elementary School District, in central Phoenix. Gress is openly gay.

== Elections ==
In the 2022 general election, Gress was elected to the legislature, becoming the top vote getter in District 4 with 61,527 votes.

Gress served with Democrat Laura Terech, who came in second with 59,292 votes. Former Republican state Representative Maria Syms came in third in the general election, falling short with 56,383 votes.

== Tenure ==
One of Gress' key campaign pledges was a plan to raise teacher pay by $10,000 per Arizona teacher. Gress introduced his Pay Teachers First Plan in January 2023.

Gress also sponsored by a bill to provide financial assistance to residents of mobile homes if they are told to vacate their homes due to redevelopment efforts. The bill was signed into law by Arizona Governor Katie Hobbs.

In the wake of the 2024 Planned Parenthood Arizona v. Mayes ruling that upheld an 1864 near-total abortion ban over a more recent law passed in 2022 that outlined a 15-week ban, Gress became one of the biggest advocates calling for its repeal. He was the sole Republican in the Arizona House to vote to repeal over three instances, being joined by fellow Republicans Justin Wilmeth and Tim Dunn, on the latter to repeal the ban alongside all Democrats. He was later removed from his House committee role.
