= Maria Syms =

American politician (born 1968)

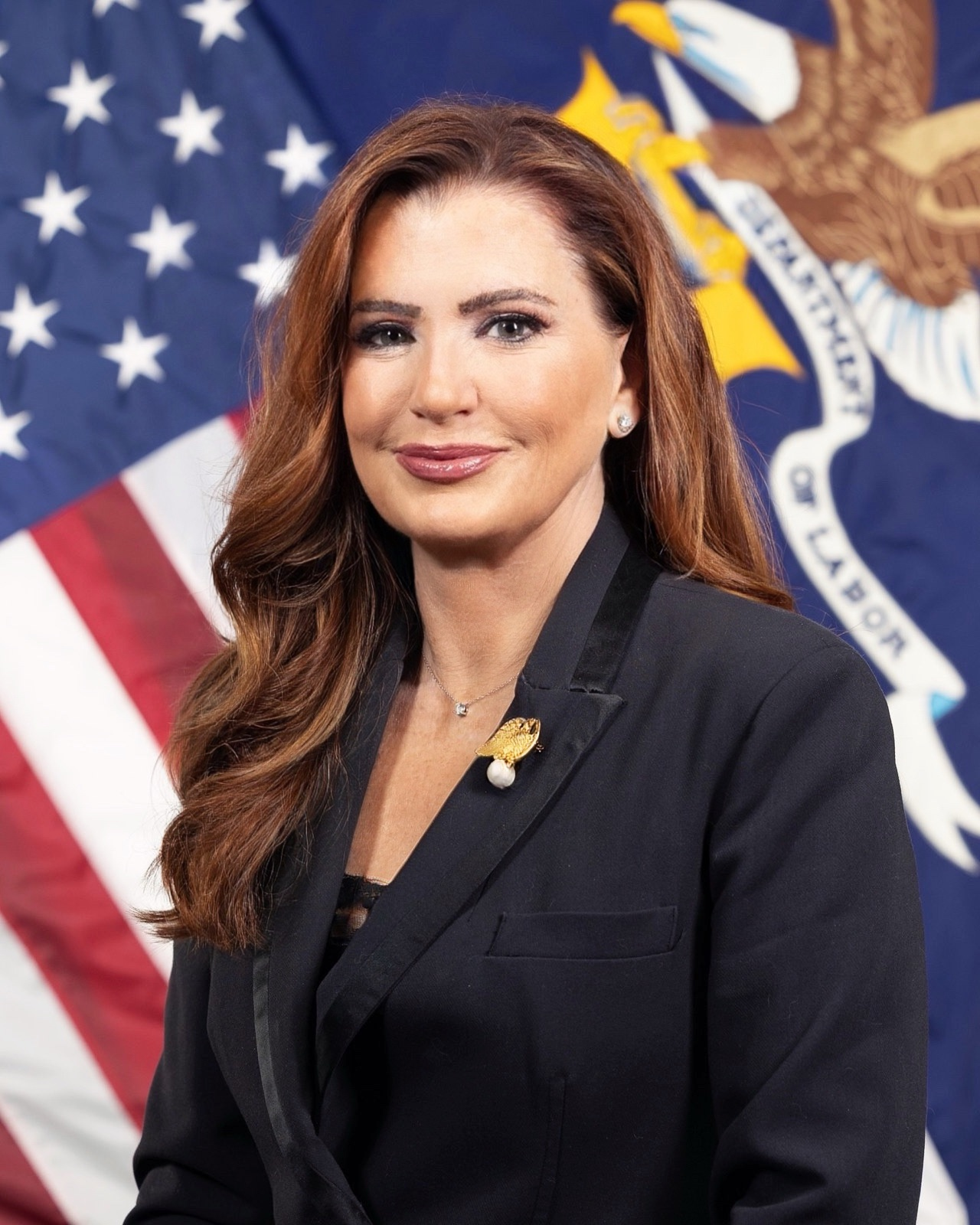
- Official portrait, 2025

Member of the Arizona House of Representatives from the 28th district
- In office January 9, 2017 – January 14, 2019
- Preceded by: Kate Brophy McGee
- Succeeded by: Aaron Lieberman

Member of the Paradise Valley Town Council
- In office 2015–2017

Personal details
- Born: Maria B. Mazzeo; January 10, 1968 (age 58) Port Jefferson, New York
- Party: Republican
- Spouse: Mark Syms
- Profession: Attorney

Maria Mazzeo Syms (born January 10, 1968) is an attorney, American politician and a former Republican member of the Arizona House of Representatives elected to represent District 28 from 2017 to 2019. Syms is currently the Deputy Assistant Secretary for Higher Education Programs for the United States Department of Education. Syms previously served as the Senior Policy Director for Education at the United States Department of Labor. From January 2023 to November 2025, Syms served as the Associate Superintendent and Director of Legal Services for the Arizona Department of Education. She has also served as Assistant Attorney General of Arizona, town council member in Paradise Valley, Arizona, and Assistant United States Attorney in California.

== Elections ==
- 2016 – With incumbents Kate Brophy McGee and Eric Meyer both running for the state senate, Maria Syms and Mary Hamway defeated Kenneth Bowers, Matt Morales and Alberto Gutier in the open District 28 Republican Primary. Syms and Democratic candidate Kelli Butler defeated Republican Mary Hamway in the general election.
- 2014 – Syms was elected to the Paradise Valley city council, receiving 1,827 votes.
- 2012 – Syms ran for Mayor of Paradise Valley, Arizona, losing to incumbent mayor Scott LeMarr.

== Career ==
As a state representative, Syms sponsored and passed legislation strengthening criminal penalties and helping crime victims. Syms’s signature legislation requires universal rape kit testing that helped clear a backlog of more than 6000 untested kits that resulted in prosecution and convictions in many cold cases. Syms served on the State House Judiciary/Public Safety, Health and Commerce Committees. Syms was named Champion of Small Business by the National Federation of Independent Businesses for her work in cutting government regulations. Syms was also recognized by the American Federation for Children as an advocate for school choice.

In August 2025, Syms received a presidential appointment as Deputy Assistant Secretary for Higher Education Programs at the US Department of Education, overseeing a portfolio of over one billion dollars of grants to colleges and universities, including HBCUs, and state and nonprofit entities. As part of several historic Interagency Agreements, Syms is detailed as a Deputy Assistant Secretary to the Departments of Labor, State, Health and Human Services, and Interior. This follows Syms’s November 2025, appointment as the Senior Policy Director for Education at the United States Department of Labor. From January 2023, to November 2025, Syms served as the Associate Superintendent and Director of Legal Services for the Arizona Department of Education. Syms argued on behalf of the Department before the Ninth Circuit Court of Appeals in support of the Arizona Save Women’s Sports Act precluding transgender athletes from participating on middle school girls sports teams. Syms also successfully represented the Department in numerous school choice administrative appeals with a perfect record of legal wins. Syms also served as an Arizona Assistant Attorney General, where she successfully prosecuted drug prescription fraud. Syms also argued before the Northern District of California to allow the State to pursue an investigation into the illegal sale of fetal tissue remains. Syms served as an assistant United States attorney for the Central District of California under President George W. Bush. In 2014, Syms was elected and served as a town councilwoman in Paradise Valley, Arizona where she also served as chair and member of the Paradise Valley Planning Commission from 2003 until 2013. Syms served as a judicial clerk and staff attorney to the United States Court of Appeals for the Third Circuit. Syms also served as an instructor and adjunct professor at ASU Law School and University of Hawaii Law School.

== Early life and education ==
Syms grew up in a working-class family on Long Island, New York. She is the daughter of the late Pasquale Mazzeo, an immigrant barber from Italy and Joyce Mazzeo (nee Keunzler), a retired elementary schoolteacher. Syms received her bachelor's degree in political science from Smith College in 1989, her Juris Doctor degree from American University in 1992 and a master's degree in public administration from Harvard University in 2014. She is a member of the bar in Arizona, California, Hawaii, Pennsylvania, Maryland, and Washington D.C.
