= Jesus Rubalcava =

American politician

Member of the Arizona House of Representatives from the 4th district
- In office January 9, 2017 – July 19, 2017 Serving with Charlene Fernandez
- Preceded by: Lisa Otondo
- Succeeded by: Geraldine Peten

Personal details
- Party: Democratic
- Education: Ottawa University

Jesus Rubalcava is a former Democratic member of the Arizona House of Representatives, representing District 4. He was first elected to the chamber in 2016. He served alongside Democratic Whip Charlene Fernandez in Legislative District 4.

== Education ==
A graduate of the Ottawa University with a Bachelor of Arts Degree in Secondary Education and History. In April 2009, he received a Special Education Master of Arts Degree from the University of Phoenix.

== Elections ==
Rubalcava was first elected to his first term as a school board member at the age of 18. He served a 2-year term as Board Clerk on the Paloma ESD Governing Board. He got re-elected in 2008 to the Gila Bend USD Governing Board where he has served since and served as Board President in 2010.

Rubalcava and incumbent Charlene Fernandez were unopposed in the Arizona House of Representatives District 4 Democratic primary and general election.

== Controversies ==
On Thursday, April 6, 2017, Rubalcava replied to a Facebook post about one of his colleagues, Sen. Debbie Lesko, by stating that he "wanted to punch her in the throat" after the passage of Lesko's school voucher expansion bill. The post was deleted after local news outlets reported on it and Rubalcava subsequently made a formal apology to Lesko on the floor of the Arizona House of Representatives.

In May 2017, an audit by Arizona's Clean Elections Commission found that Rubalcava spent $9,200 in publicly funded campaign money that could not be determined as campaign related.
