= Laura Terech =

American politician

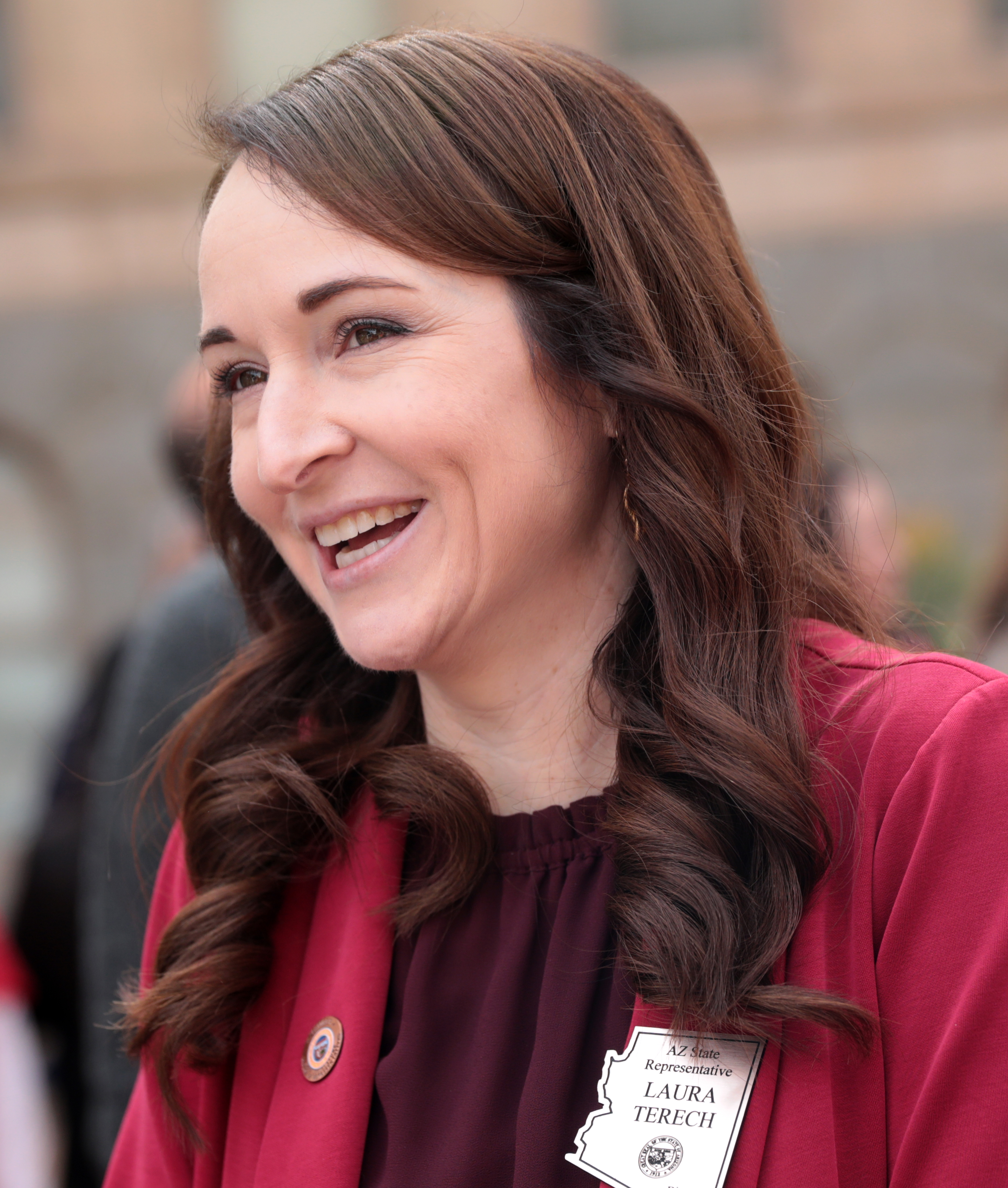
- Terech in 2023

Member of the Arizona House of Representatives from the 4th district
- In office January 9, 2023 – June 30, 2024
- Preceded by: Brian Fernandez
- Succeeded by: Eric Meyer

Personal details
- Party: Democratic
- Education: University of Arizona
- Website: Campaign Website

Laura Terech is an American politician, teacher, community organizer and a former Democratic member of the Arizona House of Representatives, elected to represent District 4 in 2022. Terech resigned from office on June 30, 2024.

== Education ==
Terech graduated from the University of Arizona, and attended grad school in New York. She went on to become a public school teacher.

== Elections ==
- 2022 Terech was unopposed in the Democratic primary. She went on to defeat former Republican State Representative Maria Syms in the general election, but was elected to serve alongside Republican newcomer Matt Gress in the legislature.
