= Michele Peña =

American politician

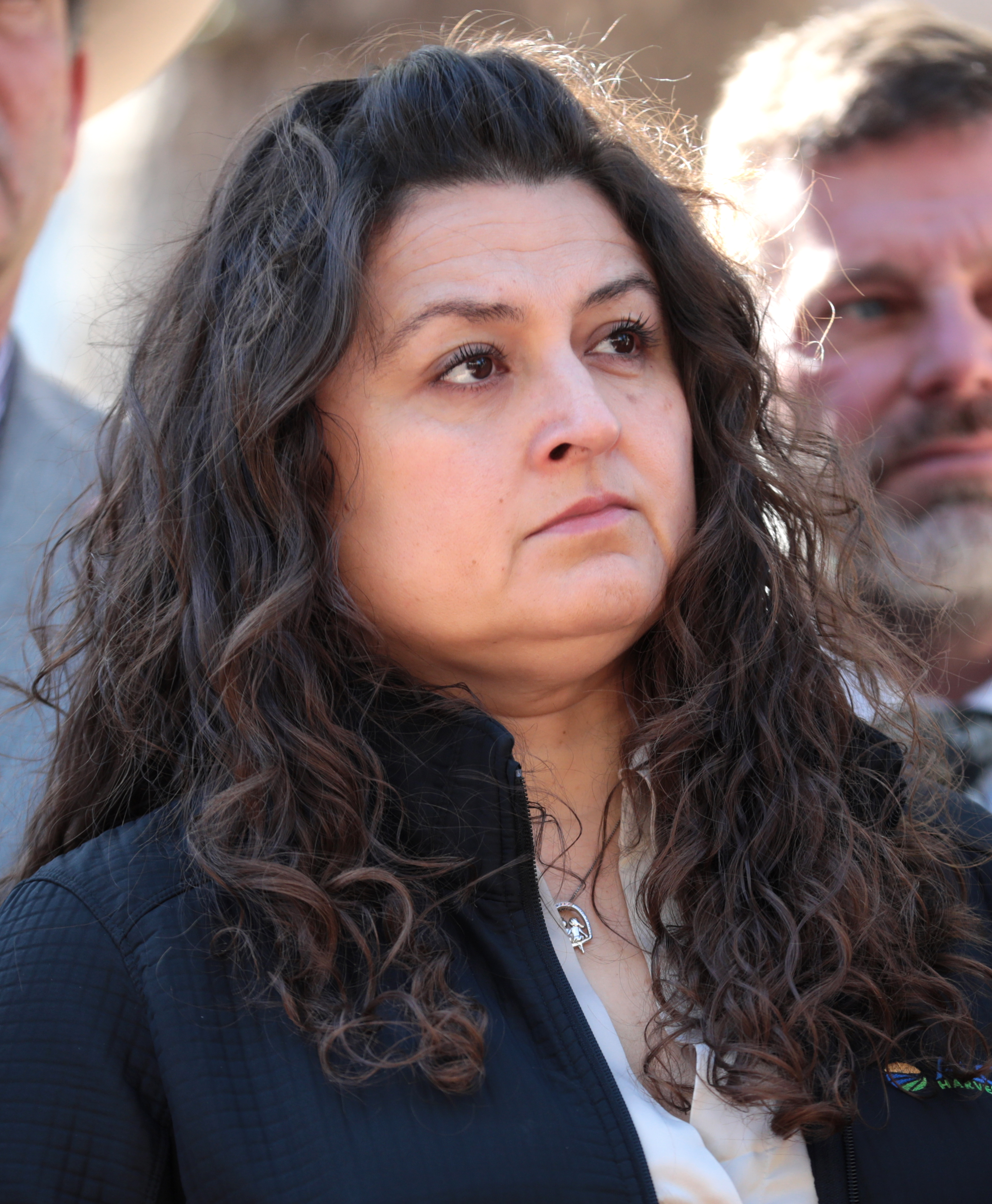

Member of the Arizona House of Representatives from the 23rd district
- Incumbent
- Assumed office January 9, 2023 Serving with Mariana Sandoval
- Preceded by: John Kavanagh

Personal details
- Party: Republican
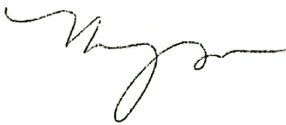
- Signature

Michele Peña is an American politician. She is a Republican member of the Arizona House of Representatives elected to represent District 23 in 2022.

Peña is a school volunteer, agricultural professional, and the daughter of an immigrant. She was raised in Yuma, Arizona. Peña lived in Tucson before returning to Yuma.

In 2023, Peña sponsored a bill that would extend the expiration date of AA graded eggs in Arizona by six days. Arizona is one of two states with a limit of 24 days or less, which contributes to over $3 million of expired eggs being thrown out every year in the state. The bill became a source of controversy as it passed with a bipartisan (both for and against) 4-3 vote in the Arizona Senate.
