= Beverly Pingerelli =

American politician and educator

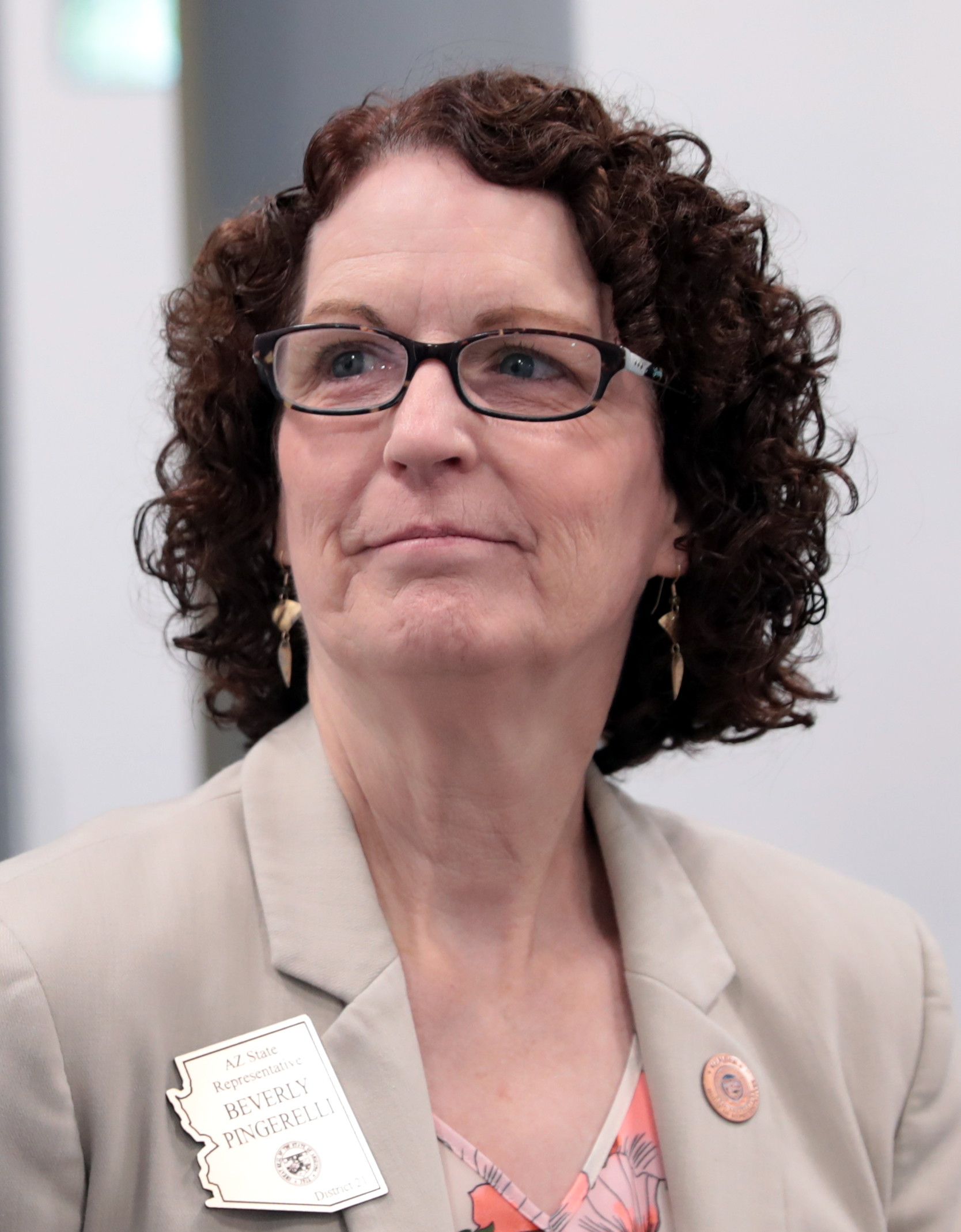
- Pingerelli in 2022

Member of the Arizona House of Representatives from the 28th district
- Incumbent
- Assumed office January 9, 2023 Serving with David Livingston
- Preceded by: Sarah Liguori

Member of the Arizona House of Representatives from the 21st district
- In office January 11, 2021 – January 9, 2023 Serving with Kevin Payne
- Preceded by: Tony Rivero
- Succeeded by: Stephanie Stahl Hamilton

Personal details
- Party: Republican
- Children: 2
- Education: Wayne State University (BS)

Beverly Pingerelli is an American politician and educator serving as a member of the Arizona House of Representatives from the 28th district. She previously represented the 21st district. Elected in 2020, she assumed office on January 11, 2021.

== Education ==
Pingerelli earned a Bachelor of Science degree in biological sciences from Wayne State University.

== Career ==
She works as a science program coordinator at Grand Canyon University. Pingerelli previously worked as a cytogenetic and molecular technologist. Pingerelli was also a member of the Peoria Unified School District Governing Board, leaving in 2022. Pingerelli was elected to the Arizona House of Representatives in 2020, succeeding Tony Rivero.

== Personal life ==
Pingerelli grew up in a neighborhood just outside of Detroit, Michigan and was the first person in her immediate family to graduate from college.

Pingerelli and her husband, Peter, have two daughters.
