= Pamela Carter (Arizona politician) =

American politician

Pam Carter
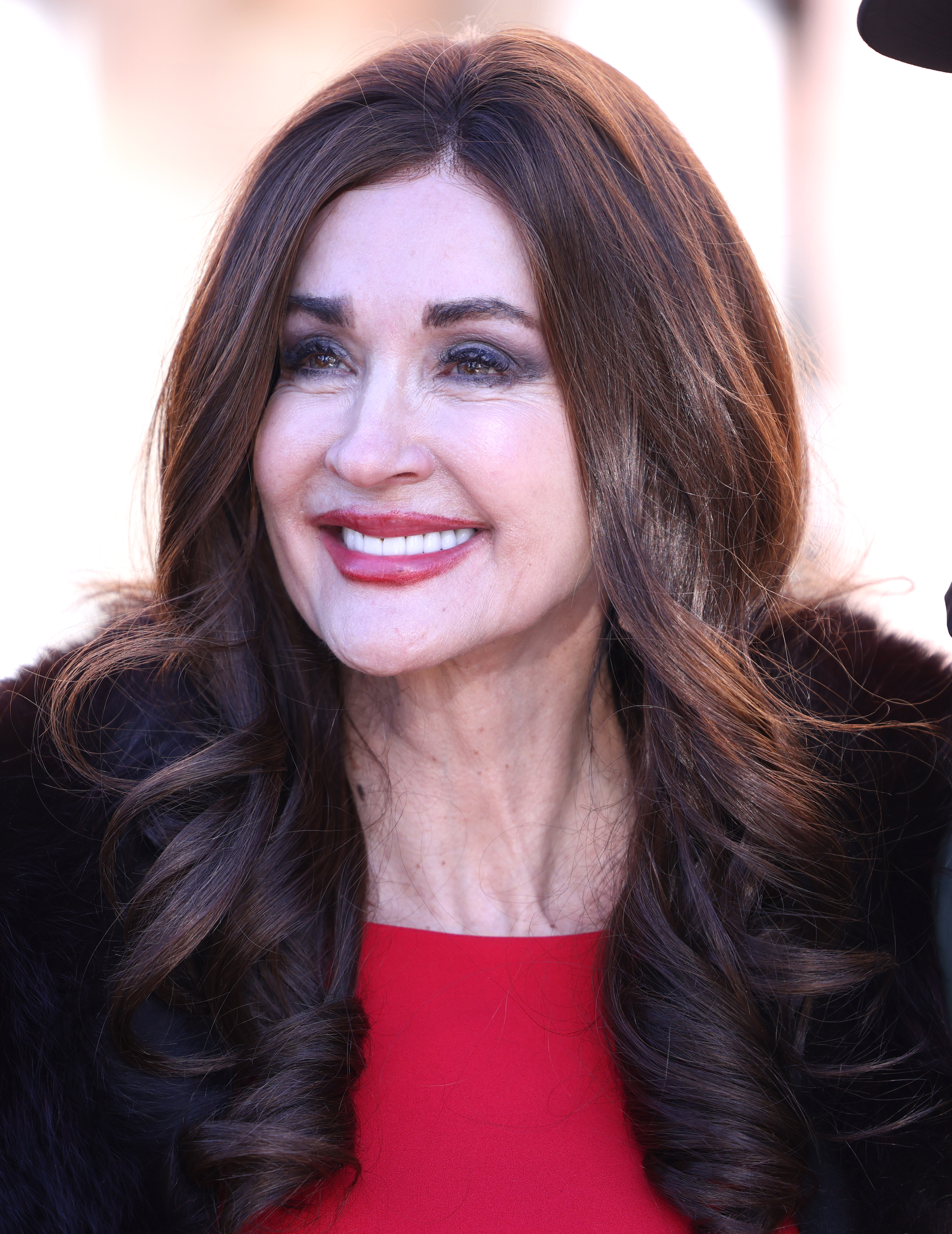
- Carter in 2025

Member of the Arizona House of Representatives from the 4th district
- Incumbent
- Assumed office January 13, 2025 Serving with Matt Gress
- Preceded by: Eric Meyer

Personal details
- Born: Arcadia, Arizona, U.S.
- Party: Republican
- Relatives: Lynda Carter (sister)
- Education: Arizona State University, Tempe (attended); Primus University of Theology (MA)

Pamela Carter is an American politician.

Carter's father is of English and Irish ancestry, and her mother, whose family hailed from Chihuahua, Mexico, is of Mexican, Spanish and French descent. Her sister is actress Lynda Carter.

Since 2025, Carter serves as a Republican member for the 4th district of the Arizona House of Representatives.
