= Intermediate care =

Level of rehabilitative care

Intermediate care provides rehabilitation, support and care for individuals who have been in hospital and require additional support before they can return home.

In the United Kingdom, intermediate care offers time-limited, short-term support and rehabilitation for individuals aiming to be able to live more independently, including:

- assistance to become as independent as possible after a hospital stay
- support to enable a person to live at home despite increasing difficulties due to illness or disability
- prevention of a permanent move into residential care where this may not be the best outcome.

A focus is often on reducing the need for admission to hospital, and allowing earlier hospital discharge.

Intermediate care is offered free of charge via NHS funding.

In the United States, an intermediate care facility (ICF), possibly located within a nursing home, is a health care facility for individuals who are disabled, elderly, or non-acutely ill, usually providing less intensive care than that offered at a hospital or skilled nursing facility.

== See also ==
- Intermediate Care Facilities for Individuals with Intellectual Disabilities
- The Intermediate Care Vehicle (ICV) operated by the HSE National Ambulance Service in Ireland
