= Lisa Otondo =

American politician

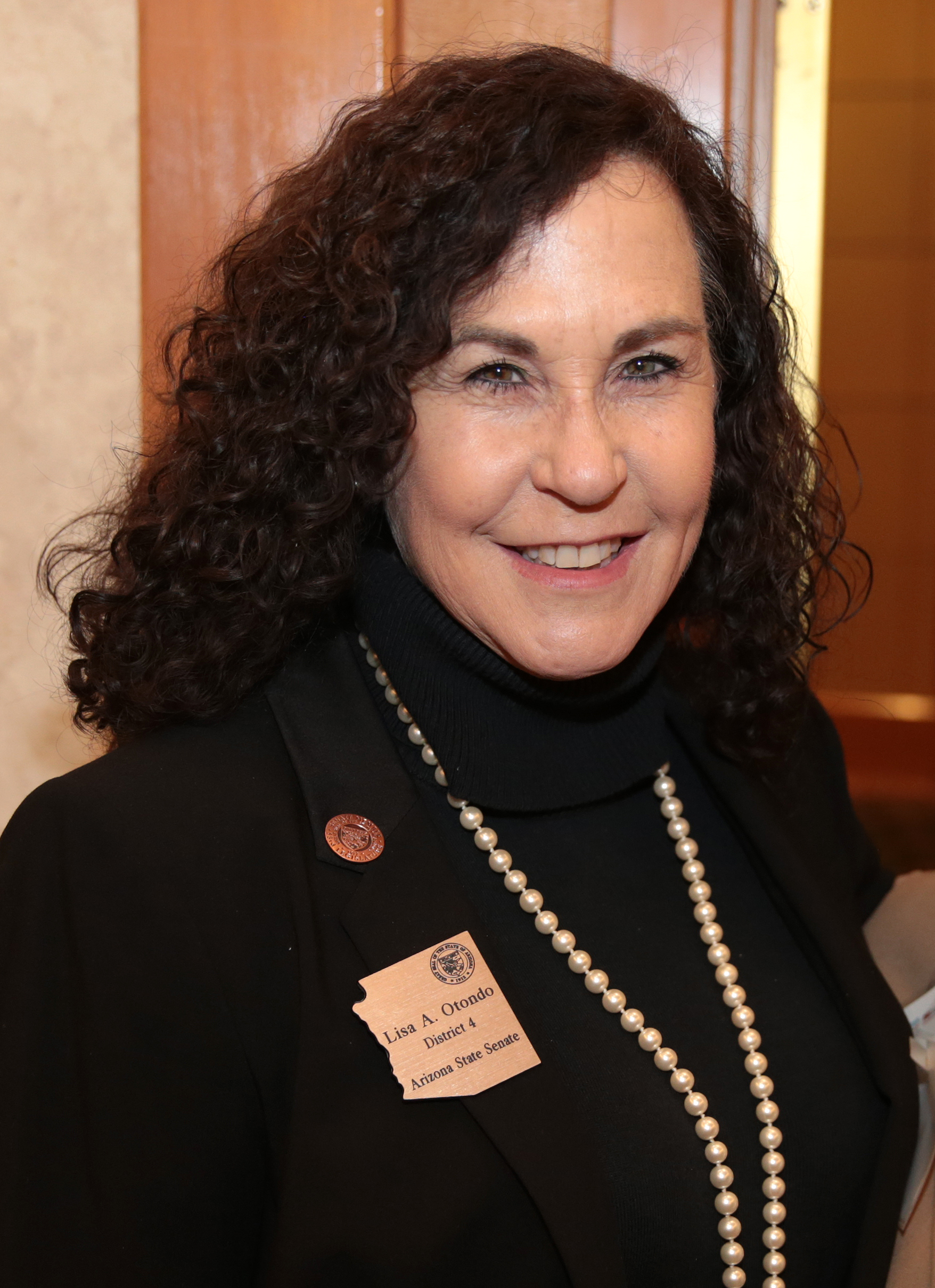

Member of the Arizona Senate from the 4th district
- In office January 9, 2017 – January 9, 2023
- Preceded by: Lynne Pancrazi
- Succeeded by: Christine Marsh

Member of the Arizona House of Representatives from the 4th district
- In office January 14, 2013 – January 9, 2017
- Succeeded by: Jesus Rubalcava

Personal details
- Born: Yuma, Arizona, U.S.
- Party: Democratic
- Education: Monterey Institute of International Studies
- Website: Senate website

Lisa Otondo is a former state senator from Arizona, who represented the 4th district. She served on three committees: Appropriations; Transportation and Technology; and Natural Resources, Energy and Water (Ranking Member). A member of the Democratic Party, Otondo was first elected to the Arizona House of Representatives in 2012. She served on the Education Committee and the Technology and Infrastructure Committee.

== Elections ==
- In 2014, Otondo successfully ran alongside the now Arizona House Democratic Leader Charlene Fernandez.
- In 2012, Otondo and Juan Carlos "J.C." Escamilla were unopposed in the general election. Otondo came first in the Democratic primary winning 4,238 votes.
