= Arizona Association of Counties =

Member association for elected officials

Arizona Association of Counties, Inc.
- AACo Seal
- Abbreviation: AACo
- Formation: 1968 (Chartered in 1967)
- Location: Phoenix, Arizona, US
- Region served: 15 counties
- President: Jeanne Kentch, County Assessor, Mohave County
- Executive Director: Jen Sweeney

The Arizona Association of Counties (AACo) was established in 1968 as a member association for all elected officials of Arizona's 15 counties. AACo represents each Arizona county and its elected officials by serving as a liaison to the Arizona State Legislature, United States Congress, other governmental agencies, the media and the public. AACo also sponsors various educational programs and renders professional services for the benefit of its membership and county government.

== Organization ==
AACo is headed by a Board of Directors consisting of five officers elected from the membership at large, one representative from each county, and one representative of each elected county office.

== Affiliates ==
The following organizations are affiliated with the Arizona Association of Counties:

- Arizona Association of Assessing Officers
- Arizona Association of Superior Court Clerks
- Arizona County Attorneys and Sheriffs Association
- Arizona Justice of the Peace Association
- Arizona Association of County Recorders
- Arizona Sheriffs Association
- Arizona Association of County School Superintendents
- Arizona Association of County Treasurers
- Arizona Constables State Association
- Arizona Association of Data Processing Administrators
- Arizona Association of County Engineers
- Arizona County Librarians Association
- Arizona County Clerks Association
- County Supervisors Association of Arizona
- Election Officials of Arizona
- Arizona Local Health Officers Association

== List of Arizona counties ==
- Apache County
- Cochise County
- Coconino County
- Gila County
- Graham County
- Greenlee County
- La Paz County
- Maricopa County
- Mohave County
- Navajo County
- Pima County
- Pinal County
- Santa Cruz County
- Yavapai County
- Yuma County
