= Mariana Sandoval =

U.S. politician and paralegal

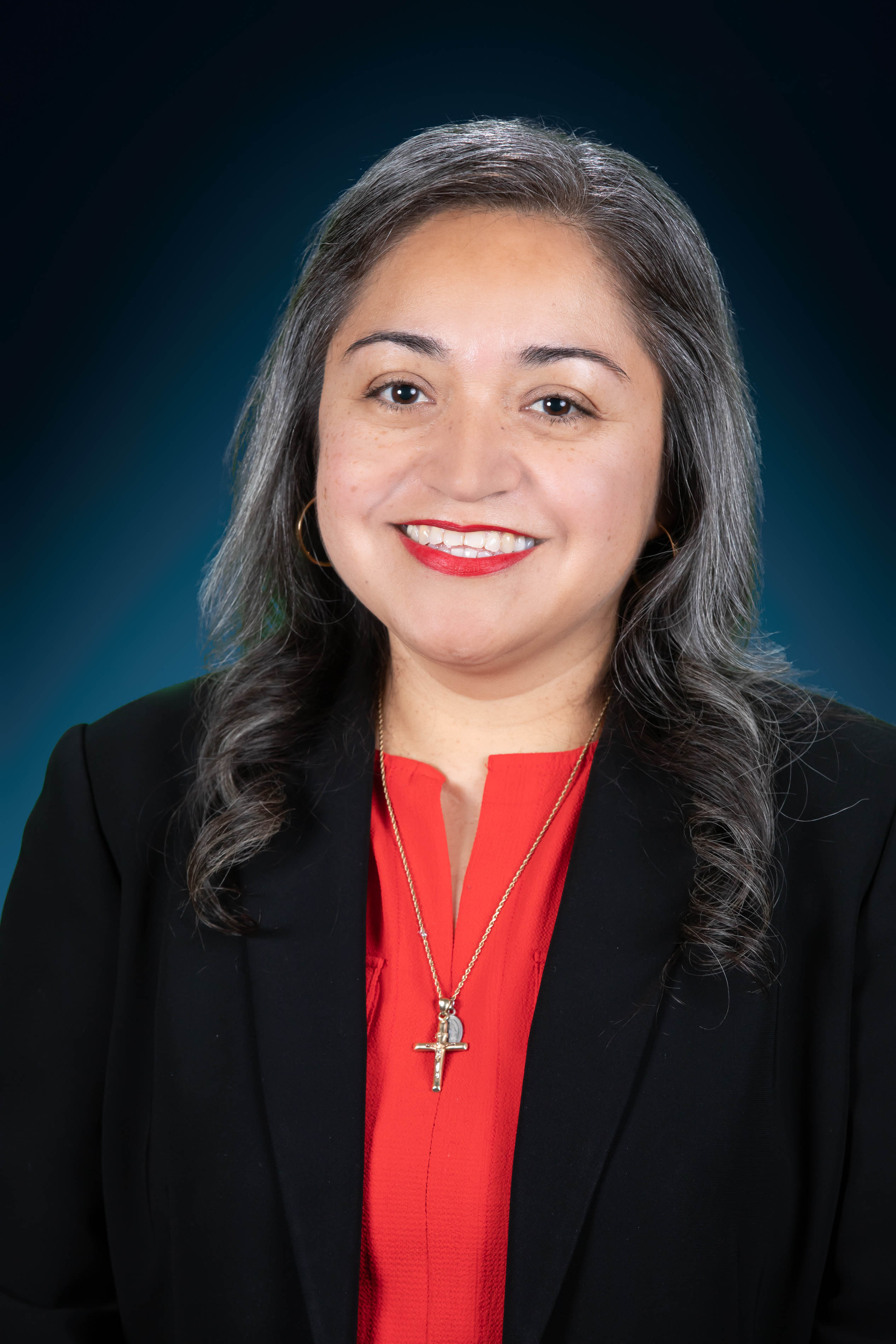

Member of the Arizona House of Representatives from the 23rd district
- Incumbent
- Assumed office January 9, 2023 Serving with Michele Pena
- Preceded by: Joseph Chaplik

Personal details
- Party: Democratic

Mariana Sandoval is an American politician and paralegal. She is a Democratic member of the Arizona House of Representatives elected to represent District 23 in 2022.

Sandoval worked as a paralegal in various legal aid offices and for 12 years at the Arizona Attorney General's office. From 2017 to 2020, she served on the governing board of the Agua Fria Union High School District. A resident of Goodyear, Arizona, in 2022, she was elected to represent District 23 in the Arizona House of Representatives.
