= Arizona's 28th legislative district =

American legislative district

- Map of District 28: Approved January 21, 2022
- Senator: Frank Carroll (R)
- House members: Beverly Pingerelli (R); David Livingston (R)
- Registration: 48.23% Republican; 21.85% Democratic; 28.80% Other
- Demographics: 80% White; 3% Black/African American; 1% Native American; 5% Asian; 10% Hispanic
- Population: 228,803
- Voting-age population: 189,892
- Registered voters: 158,777

Arizona's 28th legislative district is one of 30 in the state, consisting of a section of Maricopa County. As of 2023, there are 59 precincts in the district, all in Maricopa, with a total registered voter population of 158,777. The district has an overall population of 228,803.

Following the 2020 United States redistricting cycle, the Arizona Independent Redistricting Commission (AIRC) redrew legislative district boundaries in Arizona. According to the AIRC, the district is outside of competitive range and considered leaning Republican.

== Political representation ==
The district is represented in the 56th Arizona State Legislature, which convenes from January 1, 2023, to December 31, 2024, by Frank Carroll (R-Surprise) in the Arizona Senate and by David Livingston (R-Peoria) and Beverly Pingerelli (R-Glendale) in the Arizona House of Representatives.

Name	Image	Residence	Office	Party
Frank Carroll		Surprise	State senator	Republican
David Livingston		Peoria	State representative	Republican
Beverly Pingerelli		Glendale	State representative	Republican

== Election results ==
The 2022 elections were the first in the newly drawn district.

=== Arizona Senate ===
2022 Arizona's 28th Senate district election
Party	Candidate	Votes	%
Republican	Frank Carroll	72,873	61.83
Democratic	David Sandoval	44,982	38.17
Total votes		117,855	100
Republican hold			

=== Arizona House of Representatives ===
2022 Arizona House of Representatives election, 28th district
Party	Candidate	Votes	%
Republican	Beverly Pingerelli (incumbent)	68,965	38.08
Republican	David Livingston (incumbent)	66,983	36.98
Democratic	Stephanie Holbrook	45,180	24.94
Total votes		181,128	100.00
Republican hold			
Republican hold			

== See also ==
- List of Arizona legislative districts
- Arizona State Legislature
