= 2024 Maricopa County elections =

- November 5, 2024

All 6 county-wide elected officials
	Majority party	Minority party
Party	Republican	Democratic
Last election	5	1
Seats won	6	0
Seat change	▲1	▼1
Percentage	58.8%	41.2%

The 2024 Maricopa County elections were held on November 5, 2024, in Maricopa County, Arizona, with partisan primary elections for county offices being held on July 30, 2024. All five seats of the Board of Supervisors were up for election, as well as all county-wide elected officials (except the Clerk of the Superior Court).

Democrat Joe Biden won the county with 50.13% of the vote in the 2020 presidential election. The Republican Party held five of the six offices. The one Democrat was Sheriff Russ Skinner, who changed his party registration from Republican to Democratic in January 2024 prior to being appointed to the position.

All the county-wide elections were won by Republicans, including successfully flipping the Sheriff race. Three incumbents, Republicans County Recorder Stephen Richer and School Superintendent Steve Watson, and Democrat appointed Sheriff Russ Skinner (Note: Skinner was a registered Republican at the time of his appointment.), were defeated in their respective party primaries.

== Board of Supervisors ==
All five seats on the Maricopa County Board of Supervisors were up for reelection.

The Republican Party held four seats on the board, while the Democratic Party held one. No seats were flipped in the election.

== Assessor ==
2024 Maricopa County Assessor election
- November 5, 2024
Candidate	Eddie Cook	Gregory Freeman
Party	Republican	Democratic
Popular vote	1,023,233	871,842
Percentage	54.0%	46.0%
Assessor before election
Eddie Cook
Republican
Elected Assessor
Eddie Cook
Republican

Republican Eddie Cook was appointed in 2020, following the resignation of Paul Petersen, and was reelected in 2020 with 52.4% of the vote.

=== Republican primary candidates ===
- Eddie Cook, incumbent

=== Democratic primary candidates ===
- Gregory Freeman, commercial property manager

=== General election ===
Polling

Poll source	Date(s) administered	Sample size (Note: Key: A – all adults RV – registered voters LV – likely voters V – unclear)	Margin of error	Eddie Cook (R)	Gregory Freeman (D)	Other	Undecided
Noble Predictive Insights	August 12–16, 2024	595 (RV)	± 4.02%	33%	36%	5% (Note: "I plan to abstain from this race" with 5%)	26%

Results

2024 Maricopa County Assessor election
Party	Candidate	Votes	%	±%
Republican	Eddie Cook (incumbent)	1,023,233	54.0	+1.6
Democratic	Gregory Freeman	871,842	46.0	−1.6
Total votes		1,895,075	100.0	

== Attorney ==
2024 Maricopa County Attorney election
- November 5, 2024
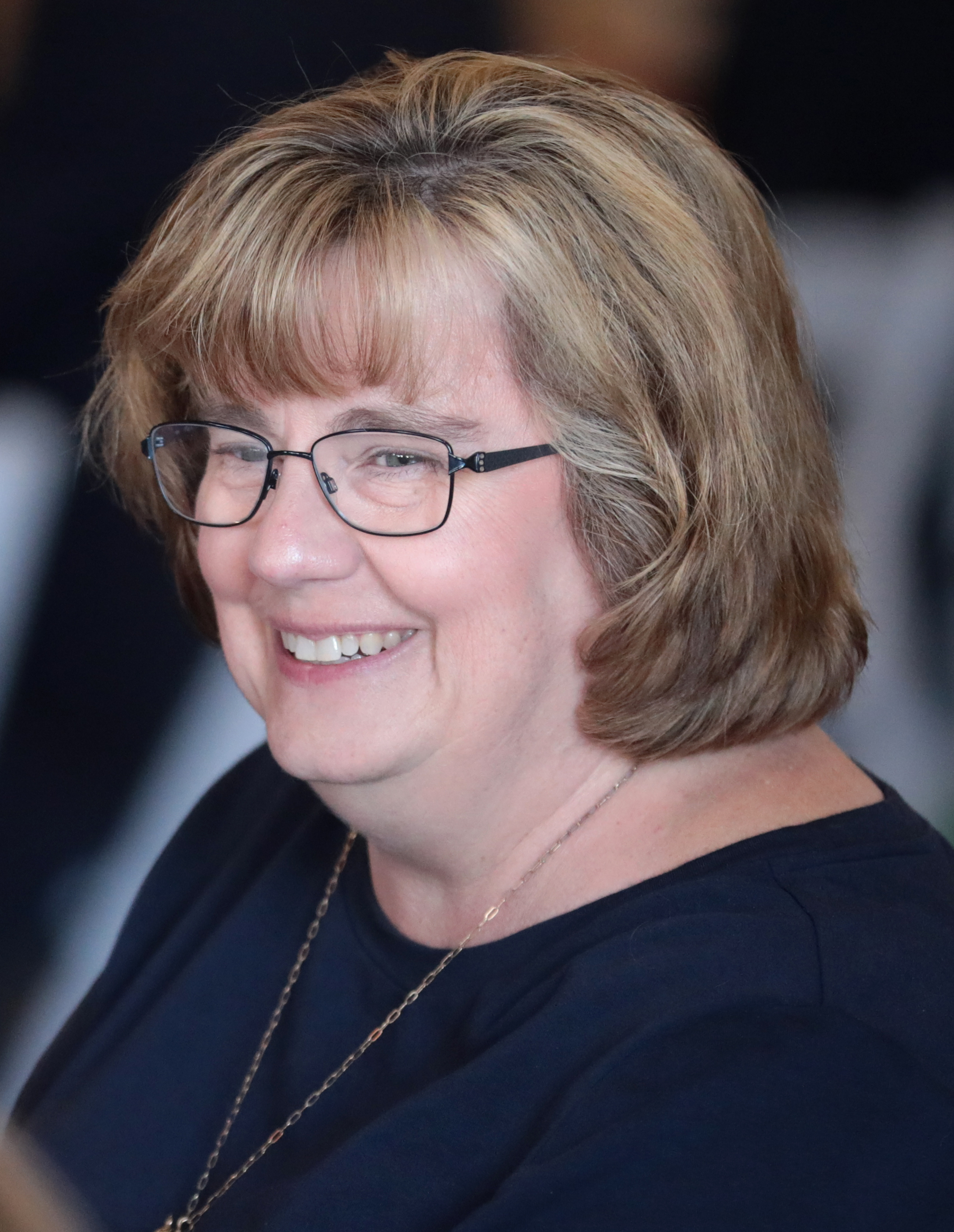

Candidate	Rachel Mitchell	Tamika Wooten
Party	Republican	Democratic
Popular vote	1,037,586	866,438
Percentage	54.5%	45.5%
- Results by precinct Mitchell: 40–50%; 50–60% 60–70%; 70–80%; 80–90%; 90–100%; Wooten: 40–50% 50–60%; 60–70%; 70–80%; 80–90%; 90–100%; Tie: 50%
Attorney before election
Rachel Mitchell
Republican
Elected Attorney
Rachel Mitchell
Republican

Republican Rachel Mitchell was first appointed in 2022, following the resignation of Allister Adel, and reelected in the 2022 special election with 52.8% of the vote.

=== Republican primary candidates ===
- Rachel Mitchell, incumbent
- Gina Godbehere, former prosecutor and candidate in 2022

=== Democratic primary candidates ===
- Tamika Wooten, pro tem judge, former Glendale chief prosecutor, and former defense attorney

=== General election ===
Polling

Poll source	Date(s) administered	Sample size	Margin of error	Rachel Mitchell (R)	Tamika Wooten (D)	Other	Undecided
Noble Predictive Insights	August 12–16, 2024	595 (RV)	± 4.02%	37%	35%	7% (Note: "I plan to abstain from this race" with 7%)	21%

Debate

2024 Maricopa County Attorney debate
No.	Date	Host	Moderator	Link	Republican	Democratic
Key: P Participant A Absent N Not invited I Invited W Withdrawn						
Key: P Participant A Absent N Not invited I Invited W Withdrawn					Rachel Mitchell	Tamika Wooten
1	Sep. 17, 2024	Arizona PBS	Ted Simons	YouTube	P	P

Results

2024 Maricopa County Attorney election
Party	Candidate	Votes	%	±%
Republican	Rachel Mitchell (incumbent)	1,037,586	54.5	+1.7
Democratic	Tamika Wooten	866,438	45.5	−1.7
Total votes		1,904,024	100.0	

== Recorder ==
2024 Maricopa County Recorder election
- November 5, 2024
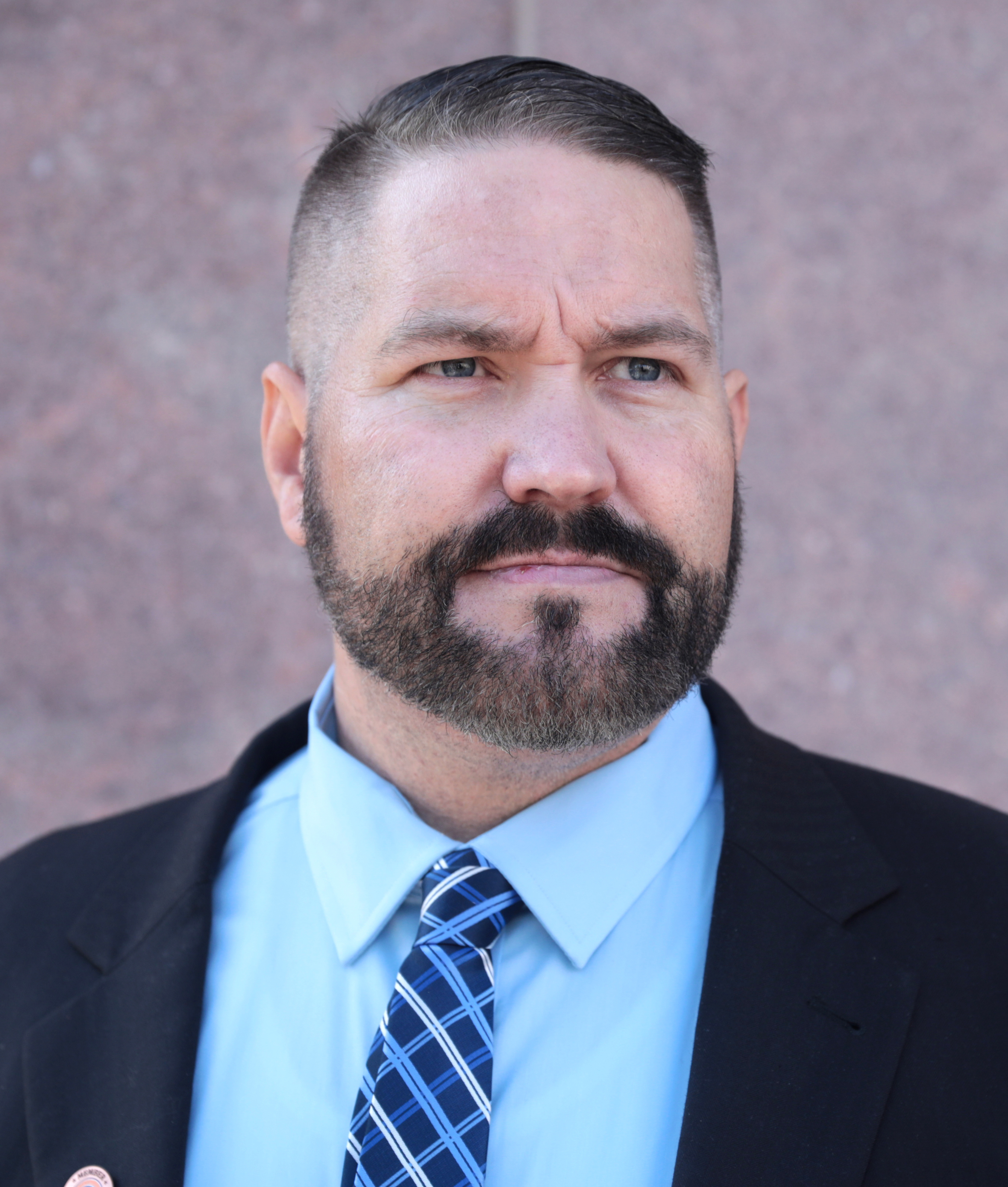

Candidate	Justin Heap	Tim Stringham
Party	Republican	Democratic
Popular vote	984,866	903,609
Percentage	52.2%	47.8%
Recorder before election
Stephen Richer
Republican
Elected Recorder
Justin Heap
Republican

Republican Stephen Richer was first elected in 2020, defeating Democratic incumbent Adrian Fontes, with 50.1% of the vote. Fontes had defeated long-time Recorder Helen Purcell in 2016 with 50.53% of the vote.

=== Republican primary candidates ===
- Stephen Richer, incumbent
- Steven Hines, businessman
- Justin Heap, state representative
- Don Hiatt, software architect and information technology professional.

Debates

2024 Maricopa County Recorder republican primary debates
No.	Date	Host	Moderator	Link	Republican	Republican	Republican
Key: P Participant A Absent N Not invited I Invited W Withdrawn							
Key: P Participant A Absent N Not invited I Invited W Withdrawn					Justin Heap	Don Hiatt	Stephen Richer
1	Jun. 11, 2024	Arizona PBS	Ted Simons	YouTube	N	P	P
2	Jun. 24, 2024	The Arizona Citizens Clean Elections Commission; Arizona Media Association	Richard Ruelas	YouTube	P	P	P

=== Democratic primary candidates ===
- Timothy Stringham, attorney and former United States Navy Judge Advocate

=== General election ===
Polling

Poll source	Date(s) administered	Sample size	Margin of error	Justin Heap (R)	Tim Stringham (D)	Other	Undecided
Blueprint Polling (Note: Poll sponsored by Stringham's campaign)	August 22–29, 2024	500 (LV)	± 4.12%	42%	45%	–	14%
Noble Predictive Insights	August 12–16, 2024	595 (RV)	± 4.02%	34%	38%	6% (Note: "I plan to abstain from this race" with 6%)	22%

Results

2024 Maricopa County Recorder election
Party	Candidate	Votes	%	±%
Republican	Justin Heap	984,866	52.2	+2.1
Democratic	Tim Stringham	903,609	47.8	−2.1
Total votes		1,888,475	100.0	

== School Superintendent ==
2024 Maricopa County School Superintendent election
- November 5, 2024
Candidate	Shelli Boggs	Laura Metcalfe
Party	Republican	Democratic
Popular vote	973,357	918,366
Percentage	51.5%	48.5%
School Superintendent before election
Steve Watson
Republican
Elected School Superintendent
Shelli Boggs
Republican

Republican Steve Watson was first elected in 2016 and reelected in 2020 with 50.3% of the vote.

=== Republican primary candidates ===
- Steve Watson, incumbent
- Nickie Kelly, math teacher at Tolleson Union High School
- Shelli Lynn Boggs, former head of the governing board of the East Valley Institute of Technology

=== Democratic primary candidates ===
- Laura Metcalfe, teacher and former County Superintendent employee

=== General election ===
Results

2024 Maricopa County School Superintendent election
Party	Candidate	Votes	%	±%
Republican	Shelli Boggs	973,357	51.5	+1.2
Democratic	Laura Metcalfe	918,366	48.5	−1.2
Total votes		1,891,723	100.0	

== Sheriff ==
2024 Maricopa County Sheriff election
- November 5, 2024
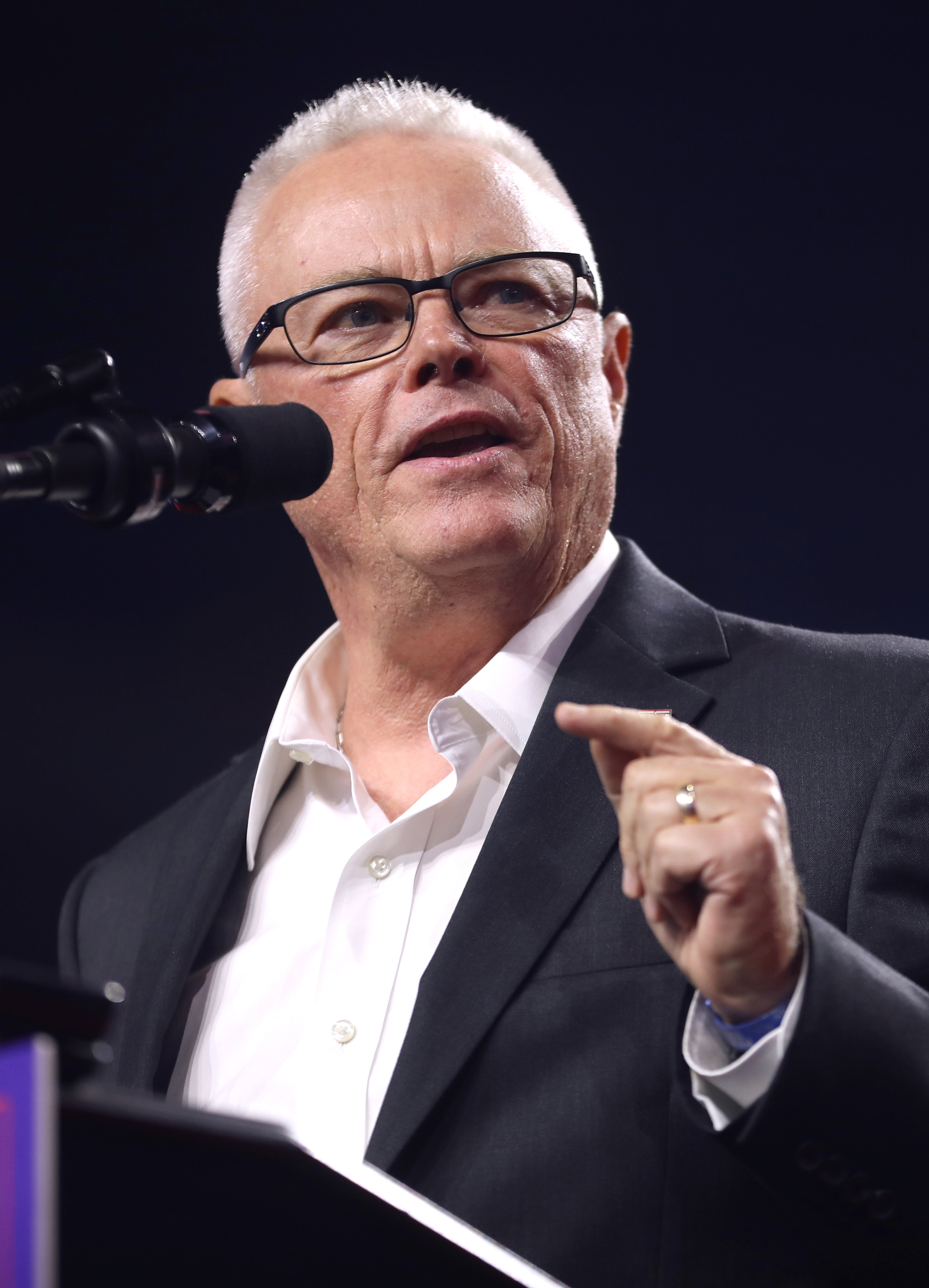

Candidate	Jerry Sheridan	Tyler Kamp
Party	Republican	Democratic
Popular vote	1,021,800	890,648
Percentage	53.4%	46.6%
Sheriff before election
Russ Skinner
Democratic
Elected Sheriff
Jerry Sheridan
Republican

Democrat Paul Penzone was first elected in 2016, defeating Republican Joe Arpaio, and reelected in 2020 with 55.7% of the vote. Penzone resigned in January 2024. Deputy Sheriff Russ Skinner, changed his party registration from Republican to Democratic and was appointed as Penzone's replacement.

=== Republican primary candidates ===
- Jerry Sheridan, former Maricopa County Sheriff's Office Chief Deputy and nominee in 2020
- Frank "Mike" Crawford, retired Glendale police officer and candidate in 2020
- Joel Paul Franklin Ellis, Navy veteran and businessman
- Joe Melone, anti-government activist
- Frank Milstead, former director of the Arizona Department of Safety

Debate

2024 Maricopa County Sheriff republican primary debate
No.	Date	Host	Moderator	Link	Republican	Republican	Republican
Key: P Participant A Absent N Not invited I Invited W Withdrawn							
Key: P Participant A Absent N Not invited I Invited W Withdrawn					Frank "Mike" Crawford	Frank Milstead	Jerry Sheridan
1	May 22, 2024	Arizona PBS	Ted Simons	YouTube	P	P	P
2	Jun. 26, 2024	The Arizona Citizens Clean Elections Commission; Arizona Media Association	Steve Goldstein; Mary Rábago	YouTube	P	P	P

=== Democratic primary candidates ===
- Russ Skinner, incumbent (former Republican)
- Jeffrey Kirkham, former police chief of Apache Junction (former Republican)
- Tyler Kamp, former Phoenix police lieutenant (former Republican)

Debate

2024 Maricopa County Sheriff democratic primary debate
No.	Date	Host	Moderator	Link	Democratic	Democratic
Key: P Participant A Absent N Not invited I Invited W Withdrawn						
Key: P Participant A Absent N Not invited I Invited W Withdrawn					Tyler Kamp	Russ Skinner
1	May 14, 2024	Arizona PBS	Ted Simons	YouTube	P	P
2	Jun. 25, 2024	The Arizona Citizens Clean Elections Commission; Arizona Media Association	Steve Goldstein; Mary Rábago	YouTube	P	P

On July 30, 2024, Republican Candidate Jerry Sheridan and Democratic Candidate Tyler Kamp won the primary election. Kamp won the Democratic nomination in spite of being exposed prior to the primary by ABC15 for sexually harassing a subordinate during his final year at the Phoenix Police Department and for illegally accessing a confidential law enforcement database.

=== General election ===
Polling

Poll source	Date(s) administered	Sample size	Margin of error	Tyler Kamp (D)	Jerry Sheridan (R)	Other	Undecided
Noble Predictive Insights	August 12–16, 2024	595 (RV)	± 4.02%	35%	35%	5%	24%

Debate

2024 Maricopa County Sheriff debate
No.	Date	Host	Moderator	Link	Democratic	Republican
Key: P Participant A Absent N Not invited I Invited W Withdrawn						
Key: P Participant A Absent N Not invited I Invited W Withdrawn					Tyler Kamp	Jerry Sheridan
1	Sep. 25, 2024	The Arizona Citizens Clean Elections Commission; Arizona Media Association	Richard Ruelas	YouTube	P	P

Results

2024 Maricopa County Sheriff election
Party	Candidate	Votes	%	±%
Republican	Jerry Sheridan	1,021,800	53.4	+9.1
Democratic	Tyler Kamp	890,648	46.6	−9.1
Total votes		1,912,448	100.0	
Republican gain from Democratic				

== Treasurer ==
2024 Maricopa County Treasurer election
- November 5, 2024
Candidate	John Allen
Party	Republican
Popular vote	1,306,868
Percentage	100.0%
Treasurer before election
John Allen
Republican
Elected Treasurer
John Allen
Republican

Republican John Allen was first elected in 2020 with 52.3% of the vote. No Democrat filed for the position.

=== Republican primary candidates ===
- John Allen, incumbent
- William Jay Lichtsinn, accountant and former naval officer

=== General election ===
Results

2024 Maricopa County Treasurer election
Party	Candidate	Votes	%	±%
Republican	John Allen (incumbent)	1,306,868	100.0	N/A
Total votes		1,306,868	100.0	

== See also ==
- 2024 Maricopa County Board of Supervisors election
- 2024 Arizona elections

== Notes ==
Partisan clients
