= 2024 Maricopa County Board of Supervisors election =

2024 Maricopa County Board of Supervisors elections
- November 5, 2024

All five seats on the Maricopa County Board of Supervisors
	Majority party	Minority party
Party	Republican	Democratic
Last election	4	1
Seats after	4	1
Seat change	Steady	Steady
Popular vote	968,821	873,585
Percentage	52.58%	47.42%
- Results by party winners Democratic hold Republican hold

The 2024 Maricopa County Board of Supervisors elections were held on November 5, 2024. Primary elections were held on August 6. All five seats of the Maricopa County, Arizona Board of Supervisors were up for election.

After the elections, the Republican Party won four seats on the board, while the Democratic Party won one.

== District 1 ==
District 1
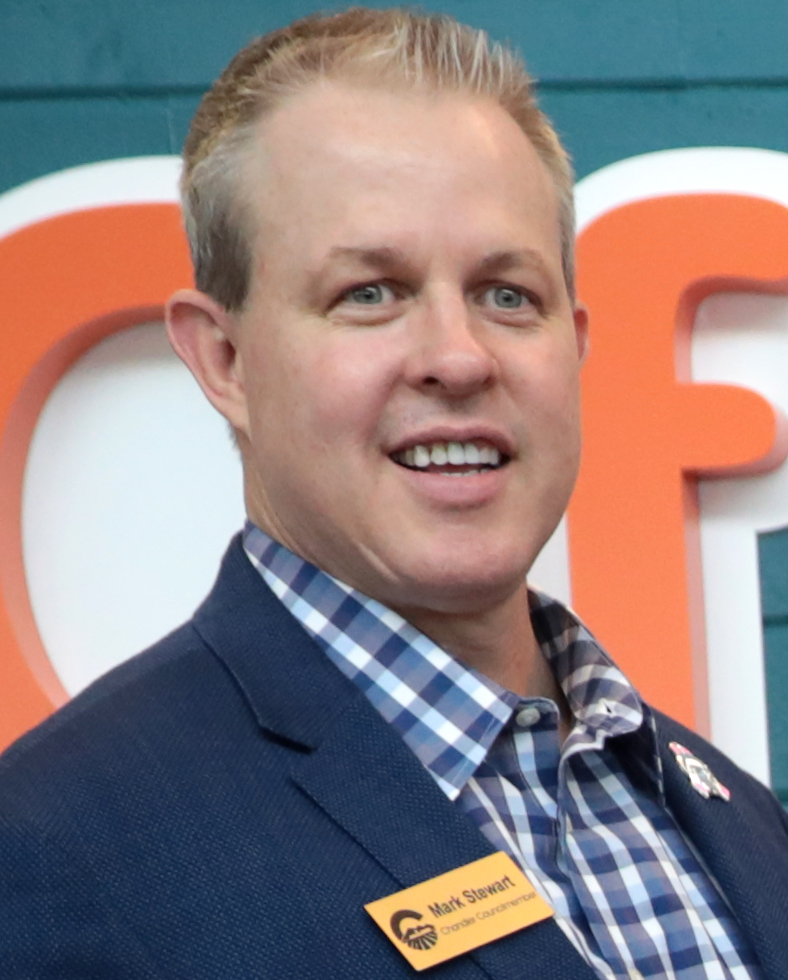

Nominee	Mark Stewart	Joel Navarro
Party	Republican	Democratic
Popular vote	217,552	202,913
Percentage	51.74%	48.26%
- Results by precinct Stewart: 50–60% 60–70%; 70–80%; 80–90%; Navarro: 50–60%; 60–70%; 70–80%
Supervisor before election
Jack Sellers
Republican
Elected Supervisor
Mark Stewart
Republican

The incumbent is Republican Jack Sellers, who was elected with 50.0% of the vote in 2020, defeating his opponent by just 403 votes. Democrat Joe Biden won this district with 50.5% of the vote in the 2020 presidential election.

=== Republican primary ===
==== Declared ====
- Jack Sellers, incumbent supervisor
- Mark Stewart, Chandler city councilor

==== Declined ====
- Jake Hoffman, state senator and 2020 fake elector for Donald Trump

==== Endorsements ====
Jack Sellers

Statewide officials

- Jan Brewer, former Governor of Arizona

==== Results ====
Republican primary results
Party	Candidate	Votes	%
Republican	Mark Stewart	52,901	65.60%
Republican	Jack Sellers (incumbent)	27,410	33.99%
Write-in		333	0.41%
Total votes		80,644	100.00%

Primary results by precinct Stewart: 50–60%; 60–70%; 70–80%; 80–90%; 90%+; No data

=== Democratic primary ===
==== Declared ====
- Joel Navarro, Tempe city councilor

==== Results ====
Democratic primary results
Party	Candidate	Votes	%
Democratic	Joel Navarro	57,030	99.68%
Write-in		182	0.32%
Total votes		57,212	100.00%

=== General election ===
==== Endorsements ====
Joel Navarro (D)

County officials

- Jack Sellers, Maricopa County supervisor for this district (Republican)

==== Results ====
General election results
Party	Candidate	Votes	%
Republican	Mark Stewart	217,552	51.74%
Democratic	Joel Navarro	202,913	48.26%
Total votes		420,465	100.00%

== District 2 ==
District 2
Nominee	Thomas Galvin	Julie Cieniawski
Party	Republican	Democratic
Popular vote	241,825	172,791
Percentage	58.33%	41.67%
- Results by precinct Galvin: 50–60% 60–70%; 70–80%; 90–100%; Cieniawski: 40–50%; 50–60%; 60–70%; 70–80%
supervisor before election
Thomas Galvin
Republican
Elected supervisor
Thomas Galvin
Republican

The incumbent is Republican Thomas Galvin, who was appointed to the seat in 2021 after the resignation of Steve Chucri and then ran unopposed in a 2022 special election to serve the remainder of Chucri's term. Republican Donald Trump won this district with 52.7% of the vote in the 2020 presidential election.

=== Republican primary ===
==== Declared ====
- Thomas Galvin, incumbent supervisor
- Michelle Ugenti-Rita, former state senator and candidate for Arizona Secretary of State in 2022

==== Endorsements ====
Thomas Galvin

Statewide officials

- Jan Brewer, former Governor of Arizona
Michelle Ugenti-Rita

U.S. Representatives

- David Schweikert, U.S. representative from Arizona's 1st congressional district

==== Results ====
Republican primary results by precinct: Galvin: 40–50%; 50–60%; 60–70%; 70–80%; Ugenti-Rita: 50–60%; 60–70%; 90–100%; Tie: 40–50%

Republican primary results
Party	Candidate	Votes	%
Republican	Thomas Galvin (incumbent)	55,712	56.31%
Republican	Michelle Ugenti-Rita	42,959	43.42%
Write-in		260	0.26%
Total votes		98,931	100.00%

=== Democratic primary ===
==== Declared ====
- Julie Cieniawski, Scottsdale Unified School District Governing Board member

==== Results ====
Democratic primary results
Party	Candidate	Votes	%
Democratic	Julie Cieniawski	55,426	99.60%
Write-in		220	0.40%
Total votes		55,646	100.00%

=== General election ===
==== Results ====
General election results
Party	Candidate	Votes	%
Republican	Thomas Galvin	241,825	58.33%
Democratic	Julie Cieniawski	172,791	41.67%
Total votes		414,616	100.00%

== District 3 ==
District 3
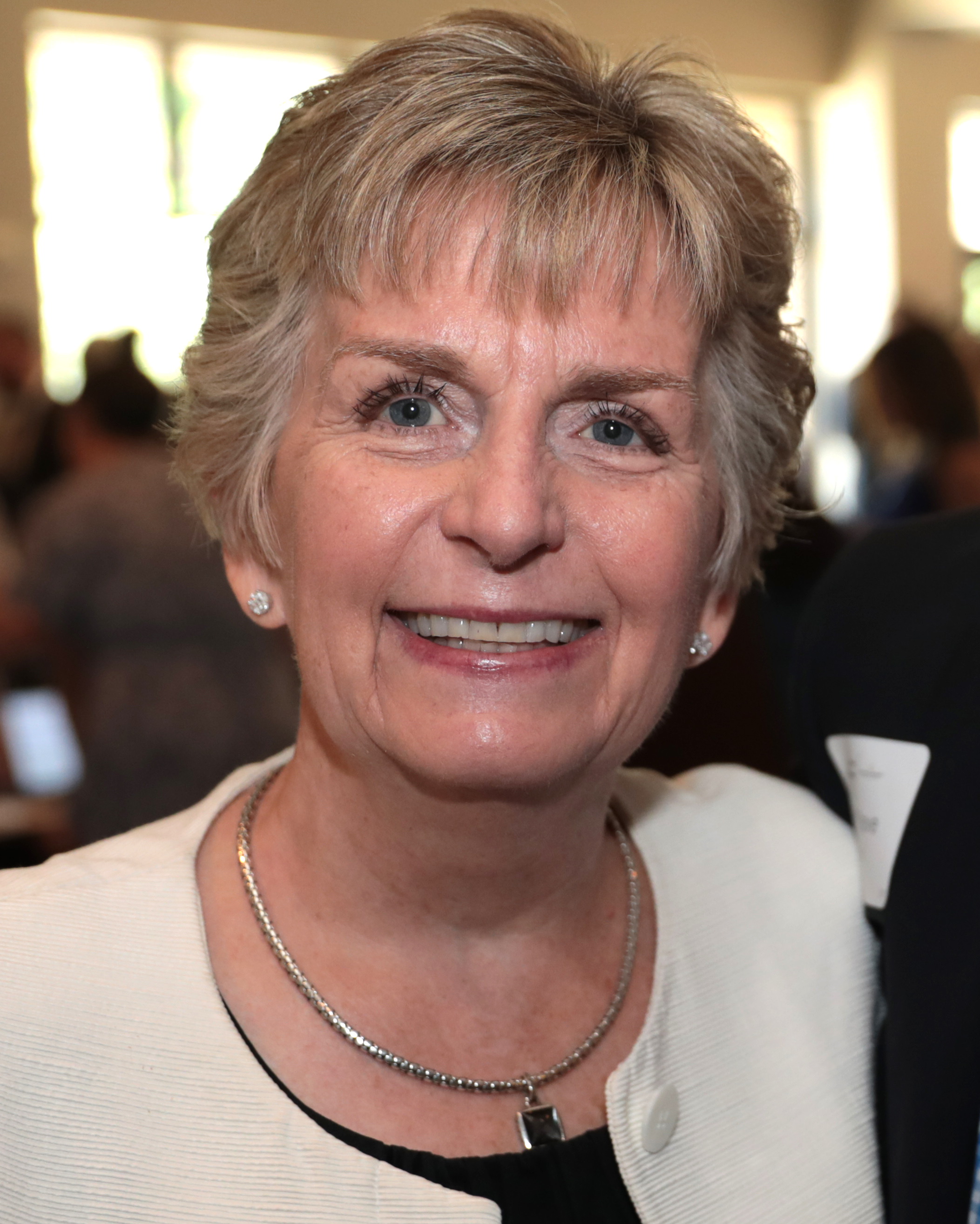

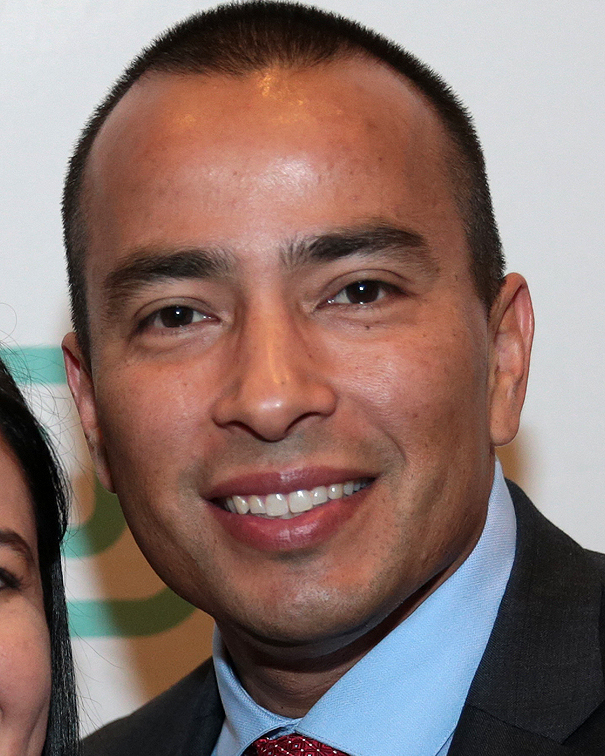
Nominee	Kate Brophy McGee	Daniel Valenzuela
Party	Republican	Democratic
Popular vote	183,383	183,219
Percentage	50.02%	49.98%
- Results by precinct Brophy McGee: 50–60% 60–70%; 70–80%; Valenzuela: 50–60%; 60–70%; 70–80%; 80–90%; Tie: 40-50%
supervisor before election
Bill Gates
Republican
Elected supervisor
Kate Brophy McGee
Republican

The incumbent is Republican Bill Gates, who was re-elected with 50.7% of the vote in 2020. Democrat Joe Biden won this district with 53.8% of the vote in the 2020 presidential election.

=== Republican primary ===
==== Declared ====
- Tabatha Lavoie, attorney and former member of the Arizona-Mexico Commission
- Kate Brophy McGee, former state senator

==== Declined ====
- Sal DiCiccio, former Phoenix city councilor
- Bill Gates, incumbent supervisor
- Beau Lane, advertising executive and candidate for Arizona Secretary of State in 2022 (endorsed Brophy McGee)

==== Endorsements ====
Kate Brophy McGee

Statewide officials

- Jan Brewer, former Governor of Arizona

==== Results ====
Republican primary results
Party	Candidate	Votes	%
Republican	Kate Brophy McGee	47,796	71.34%
Republican	Tabatha Lavoie	18,917	28.24%
Write-in		280	0.42%
Total votes		66,993	100.00%

=== Democratic primary ===
==== Declared ====
- Daniel Valenzuela, former Phoenix city councilor and runner-up for mayor of Phoenix in 2019

==== Results ====
Democratic primary results
Party	Candidate	Votes	%
Democratic	Daniel Valenzuela	62,610	99.62%
Write-in		239	0.38
Total votes		62,849	100.00%

=== General election ===
==== Results ====
General election results
Party	Candidate	Votes	%
Republican	Kate Brophy McGee	183,383	50.02%
Democratic	Daniel Valenzuela	183,219	49.98%
Total votes		366,602	100.00%

== District 4 ==
District 4
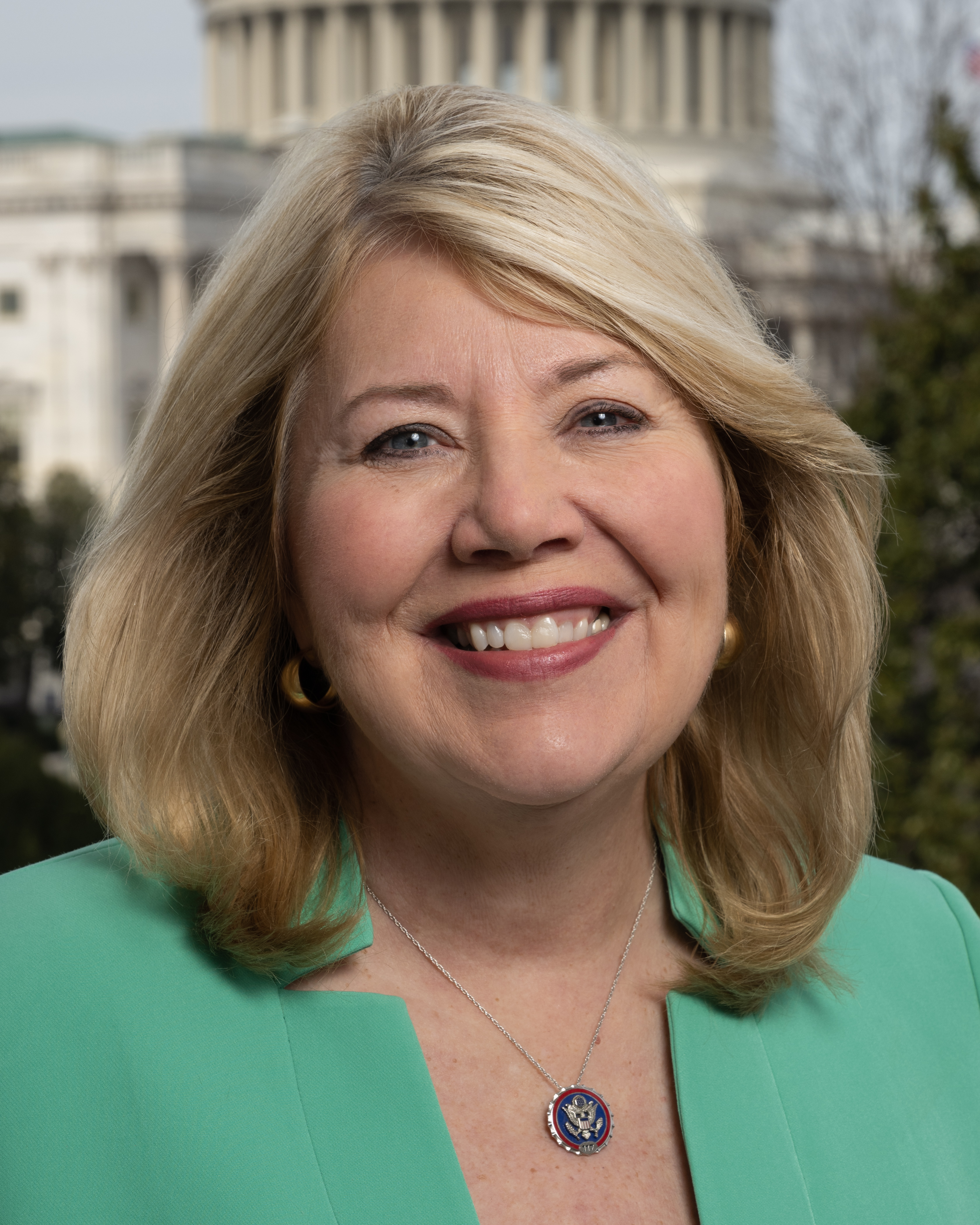

Nominee	Debbie Lesko	David Sandoval
Party	Republican	Democratic
Popular vote	248,812	166,144
Percentage	59.96%	40.04%
- Results by precinct Lesko: 40–50%; 50–60% 60–70%; 70–80%; 80–90%; 90–100%; Sandoval: 50–60%; 60–70%
supervisor before election
Clint Hickman
Republican
Elected supervisor
Debbie Lesko
Republican

The incumbent Republican Clint Hickman was re-elected with 58.5% of the vote in 2020 and declined to run again. Republican Donald Trump won this district with 56.9% of the vote in the 2020 presidential election.

=== Republican primary ===
==== Declared ====
- Bob Branch, Maricopa County Parks and Recreation Advisory Commission member and candidate for Superintendent of Public Instruction in 2018
- Debbie Lesko, U.S. representative from Arizona's 8th congressional district

==== Withdrawn ====
- Rob Canterbury, security officer and former Arizona Republican Party sergeant-at-arms
- Jack Hastings, Surprise city councilor

==== Declined ====
- Clint Hickman, incumbent supervisor

==== Endorsements ====
Debbie Lesko

Statewide officials

- Jan Brewer, former Governor of Arizona

==== Results ====
Republican primary results
Party	Candidate	Votes	%
Republican	Debbie Lesko	81,555	71.93%
Republican	Bob Branch	31,522	27.80%
Write-in		301	0.27%
Total votes		113,378	100.00%

=== Democratic primary ===
==== Declared ====
- David Sandoval, Peoria Unified School District Governing Board member

==== Results ====
Democratic primary results
Party	Candidate	Votes	%
Democratic	David Sandoval	53,775	99.57%
Write-in		231	0.43%
Total votes		54,006	100.00%

=== General election ===
==== Results ====
General election results
Party	Candidate	Votes	%
Republican	Debbie Lesko	248,812	59.96%
Democratic	David Sandoval	166,144	40.04%
Total votes		414,956	100.00%

== District 5 ==
District 5
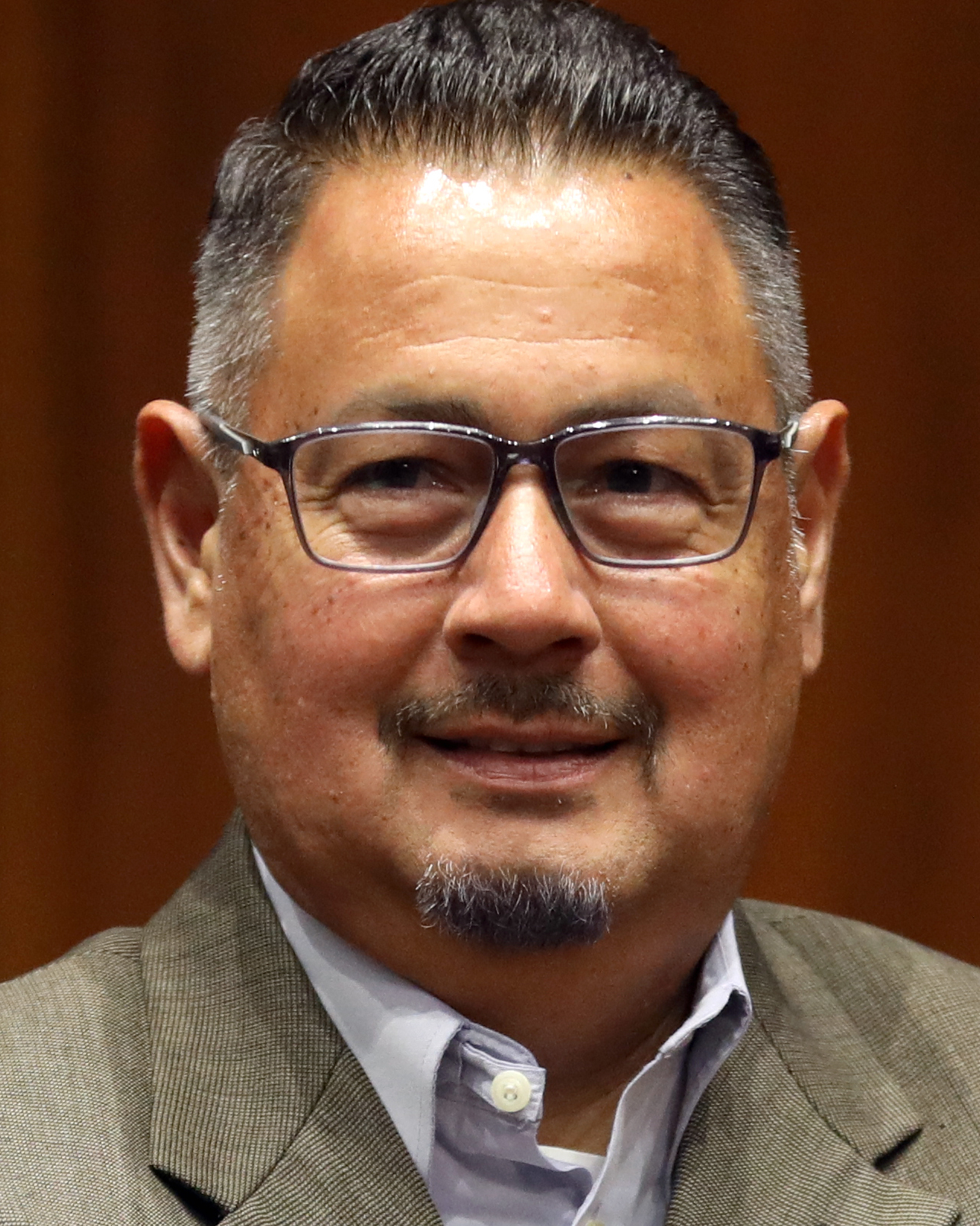

Nominee	Steve Gallardo	Cynthia Niemann
Party	Democratic	Republican
Popular vote	148,518	77,249
Percentage	65.78%	34.22%
- Results by precinct Gallardo: 50–60% 60–70%; 70–80%; 80–90%; 90–100%; Niemann: 50–60%; 60–70%; 70–80%; 80–90%
supervisor before election
Steve Gallardo
Democratic
Elected supervisor
Steve Gallardo
Democratic

The incumbent is Democrat Steve Gallardo, who was re-elected with 97.6% of the vote in 2020 with only write-in opposition. Democrat Joe Biden won this district with 67.7% of the vote in the 2020 presidential election.

=== Democratic primary ===
==== Declared ====
- Steve Gallardo, incumbent supervisor

==== Results ====
Democratic primary results
Party	Candidate	Votes	%
Democratic	Steve Gallardo (incumbent)	38,071	99.48%
Write-in		200	0.52%
Total votes		38,271	100.00%

=== Republican primary ===
==== Declared ====
- Ann Niemann, former adoption agency owner

==== Results ====
Republican primary results
Party	Candidate	Votes	%
Republican	Ann Niemann	19,339	98.94%
Write-in		208	1.06%
Total votes		19,547	100.00%

=== General election ===
==== Results ====
General election results
Party	Candidate	Votes	%
Democratic	Steve Gallardo (incumbent)	148,518	65.78%
Republican	Ann Niemann	77,249	34.22%
Total votes		225,767	100.00%

== See also ==
- 2024 Maricopa County elections
- 2024 Arizona elections
