= Maricopa County Recorder's Office =

State of Arizona county government office

Recorder of Maricopa County
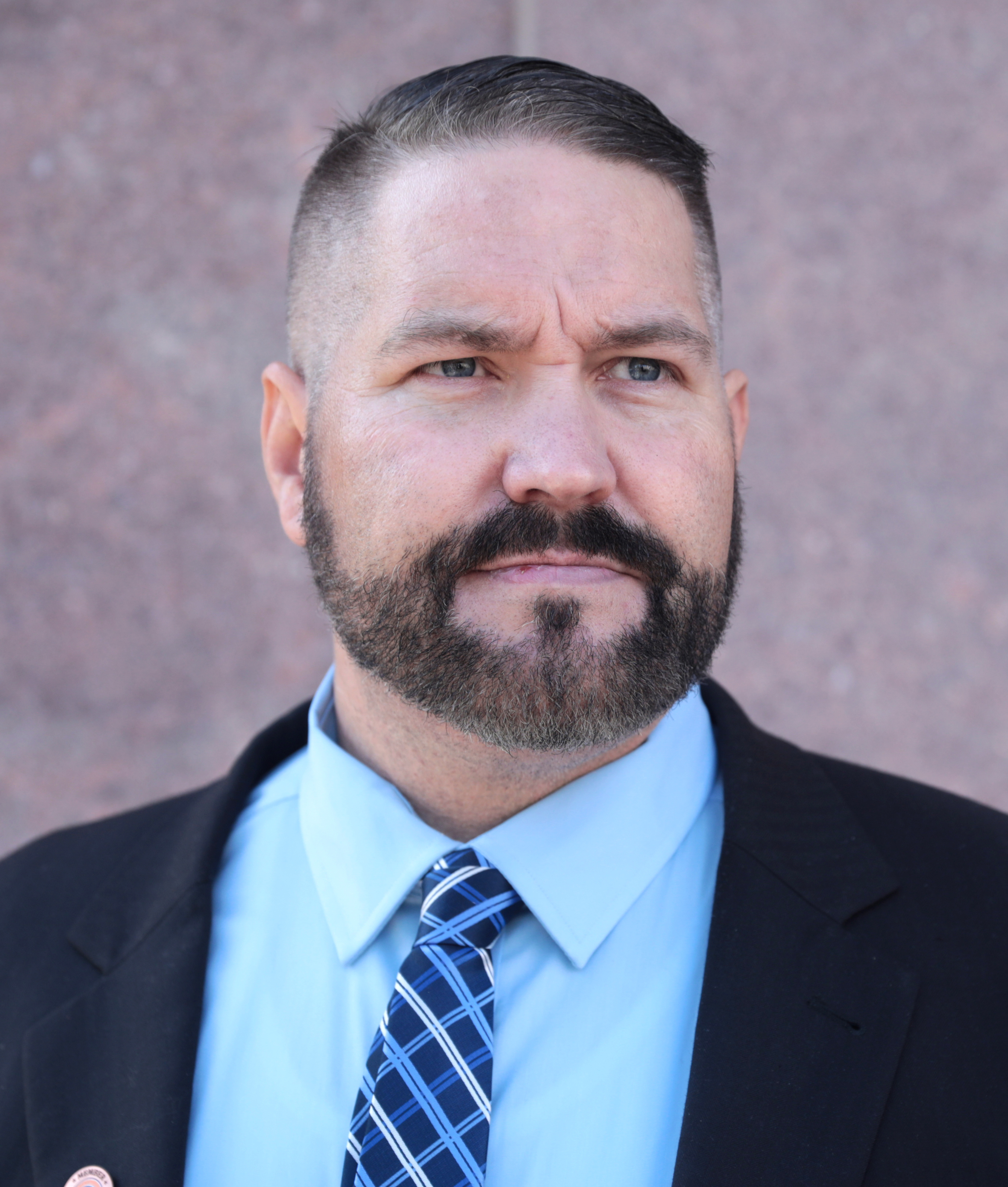
- Incumbent; Justin Heap since January 1, 2025
- Term length: 4 years
- Formation: 1871; 155 years ago
- First holder: James L. Mercer
- Website: Maricopa County Recorder's Office website

The Maricopa County Recorder's Office is a county office located in Maricopa County, Arizona. It has three primary statutory functions: document recordation, voter registration, and early voting.

== Maricopa County Recorder ==
Justin Heap became the 31st Recorder of Maricopa County in 2025.

Stephen Richer was the 30th Recorder of Maricopa County. He was elected in November 2020 and took office in January 2021. Richer defeated the Democratic incumbent Adrian Fontes by 4,599 votes. Stephen Richer graduated with a bachelor's degree from Tulane University and obtained a Juris Doctor degree from the University of Chicago.

In 2019, Richer conducted a partisan audit and drafted a 229-page report, which aired unfounded election conspiracies related to the 2018 election. Richer's audit alleged Fontes engaged in partisanship and questionable election related practices conspiring with Democratic candidates to gain partisan advantage while presenting an affidavit of a voter who claimed that when he arrived at the polling location he was given a ballot that was pre-filled out for Democratic candidates Sinema and Stanton as anecdotal evidence, which Richer then insinuated was evidence of a more widespread voter fraud conspiracy by Fontes to rig the 2018 election.

After taking office, Richer has faced scrutiny from his constituent base, who elected him to office based on promises that if elected, he would solve the election-related issues he aired in his audit of the 2018 election. Most notably, Republican Kari Lake has criticized Stephen Richer after losing the 2022 Arizona gubernatorial race by over 16,000 votes. As a result, in 2023, Recorder Richer sued Kari Lake for defamation, citing how it has caused death threats to be levied at him and his family.

Dissatisfaction with Richer continued to grow, and he was publicly disparaged for disagreeing that the 2020 election was stolen by Democrats in favor of Biden instead of Trump. Richer discussed this in an interview with 60 Minutes that aired on October 7, 2024.

In February 2025, Richer was listed in a bomb threat among others such as George Conway, Mark Cuban, and Michael Fanone. The text of the email said that they deserve to die.

=== Previous Recorders of Maricopa County ===
Maricopa County Recorders Since 1871
Maricopa County Recorders	Date
Justin Heap	2025 - Present
Stephen Richer	2021 - 2025
Adrian Fontes	2017 - 2020
Helen Purcell	1989 - 2016
Keith Poletis	1984 - 1988
Bill Henry	1978 - 1983
Tom Freestone	1974 - 1978
Paul N. Marston	1969 -1974
Clifford H. Ward	1963 - 1968
N.C. "Kelly" Moore Dec	1957 - 1963
Roger G. Laveen	1939 - 1956
William H. Linville	1931 - 1938
J.K. Ward	1929 - 1930
William H. Linville	1923 - 1928
Edith M. Jacobs	1919 - 1922
Vernon L. Vaughn	1912 - 1918
Clay F. Leonard	1905 - 1912
B. Frank McFall	1901 - 1904
Frederick W. Sheridan	1897 - 1900
John W. Kincaid	1895 - 1896
Winthrop Sears	1895
Neri Ficklin Osborn	1889 -1894
Henry Lincoln Wharton	1887 - 1888
William Robertson Morris	1885 - 1886
Neri Ficklin Osborn	1883 - 1884
Richard Frank Kirkland	1881 - 1882
William F. McNulty	1877 - 1880
James A. Parker	1875 - 1876
Charles F. Cate	1873 - 1874
J.R. Darroche	1872
James L. Mercer	1871 - 1872

== History ==
The Maricopa County Recorder's Office's first recorded document took place in 1871 and was recorded by the first Maricopa County Recorder, James L. Mercer.

== Statutory functions ==
The Recorder's Office has three main statutory functions in Maricopa County: document recordation, voter registration, and early voting.

== Document recordation ==
One of the responsibilities of the Maricopa County Recorder's Office is the recordation and maintenance of public documents. These public records include an array of documents, but the vast majority are real-estate related. The Office records approximately 1 million documents annually and interacts with 3,000 to 5,000 customers on a daily basis. Currently, the Recorder's Office offers over 50 million searchable public documents dating back to 1871. The majority of documents are recorded digitally. Documents can now be E-recorded in Maricopa County.

=== Maricopa Title Alert ===
In June 2023, the Maricopa County Recorder's Office launched Maricopa Title Alert. This program monitors recorded documents in Maricopa County and alerts subscribers if a document is recorded in a specific individual's name and/or business name. There are currently over 45,000 individuals signed up for this free service.

== Voter registration ==
The Maricopa County Recorder's Office is responsible for maintaining the voter registration data for all of Maricopa County. As of October 2023, there were over 2.5 million active registered voters in Maricopa County.

=== 2022 voter list maintenance ===
Recorder Stephen Richer highlighted in the Maricopa Recorder's Office's 2022 Annual Report his work in "...cleaning the voter rolls..." and mentioned how, despite being the fastest growing county in the United States, the total number of active registered voters decreased by 160,000. He mentioned how he accomplished this by making this a priority for his office and through the hiring of a new Voter Registration Department Director, increasing staff, and improving technology.

== Early voting ==
The Maricopa County Recorder's Office directs the daily operations of all election services, as it relates to campaign finance, candidate filing, and early voting activities, by all applicable laws, ordinances, rules, and regulations. The Director will provide direct oversight for the majority. of election services for which the County Recorder is statutorily responsible. The Recorder's duties are expansive regarding voter registration, early voting, and provisional ballots. Some of these responsibilities, as defined in Arizona Statutes are listed below.

- Voter registration
- Ensuring compliance with the Uniformed and Overseas Citizens Absentee Voting Act
- Maintaining voter rolls and inactive voter lists
- Petition and other candidate nomination challenges
- Certifying, creating, and distributing precinct registers
- Administering early voting and special district mail ballot elections
- Provisional ballots and voter challenges

Additionally, the office partners with the Maricopa County Board of Supervisors in the planning and execution of jurisdictional, county, state, and federal level elections.

== Office locations ==
- Main Downtown Office - 111 S. Third Ave, Phoenix, AZ 85003
- Southeast Mesa Office - 222 E. Javelina, Mesa, AZ 85210
- Elections MCTEC Office - 510 S. Third Ave., Phoenix, AZ 85003
