= Jacqueline Parker =

Jacqueline Parker may refer to:

- Jacqui Parker (born 1966), English athlete
- Jacqueline Parker (politician), Arizona state representative
