= Ralph Heap =

American politician

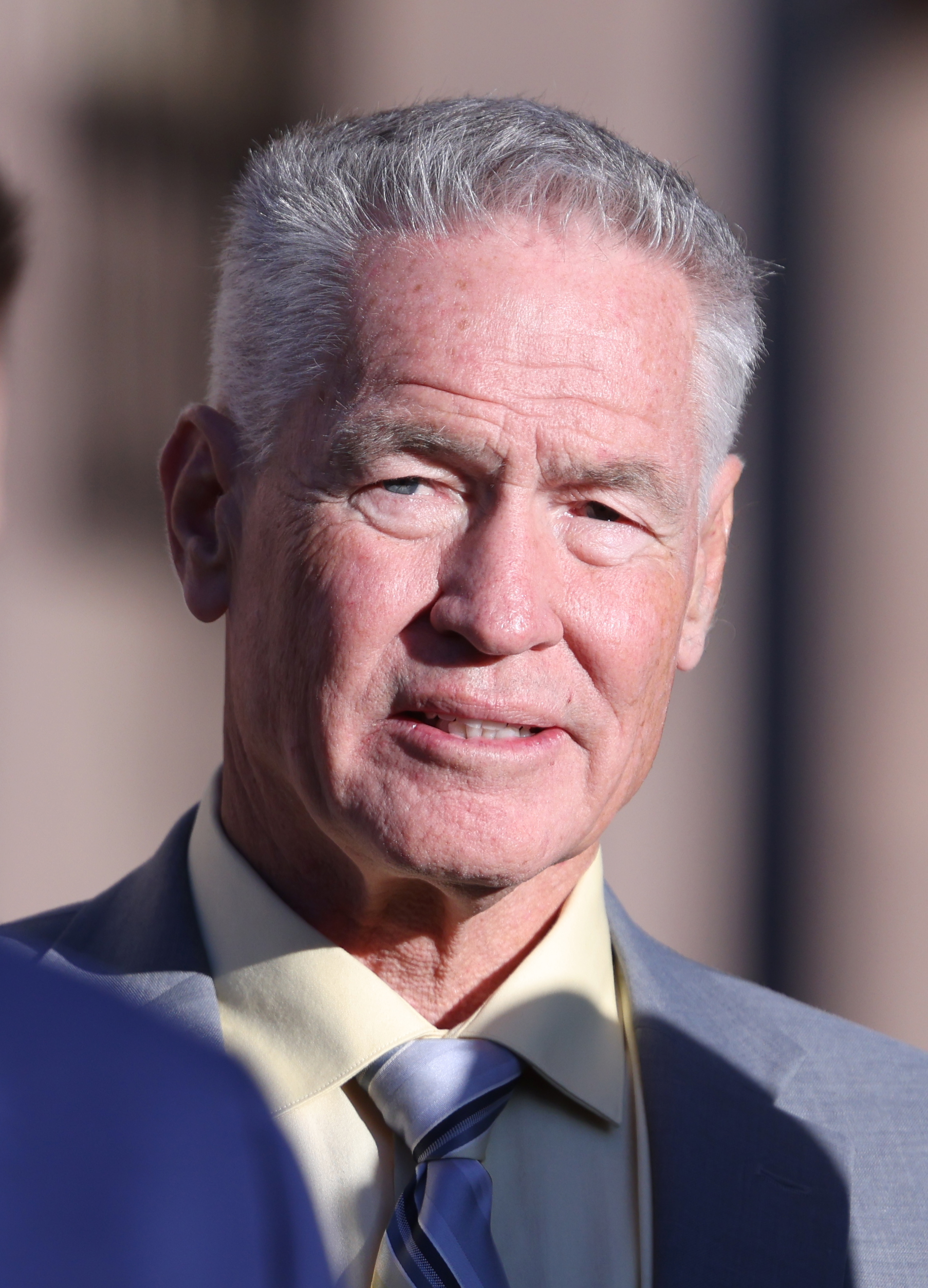
- Heap in 2025

Member of the Arizona House of Representatives from the 10th district
- Incumbent
- Assumed office January 13, 2025 Serving with Justin Olson
- Preceded by: Justin Heap
- Succeeded by: James Rogers (elect)

Personal details
- Born: 1951 or 1952 (age 74–75)
- Party: Republican
- Children: Justin
- Education: Arizona State University, Tempe (BS); University of Arizona (MD)

Ralph Heap (born 1951/1952) is an American orthopedic surgeon and politician serving as a member of the Arizona House of Representatives for the 14th district since 2025. A Republican, he was elected in 2024 to succeed his son, Justin Heap. On June 10th, 2025, he announced his candidacy for member of the Arizona Corporation Commission alongside David Marshall. On July 21st, 2026, defeated incumbent Nick Myers in the primary to advance to the general election.
