= Cory McGarr =

American politician

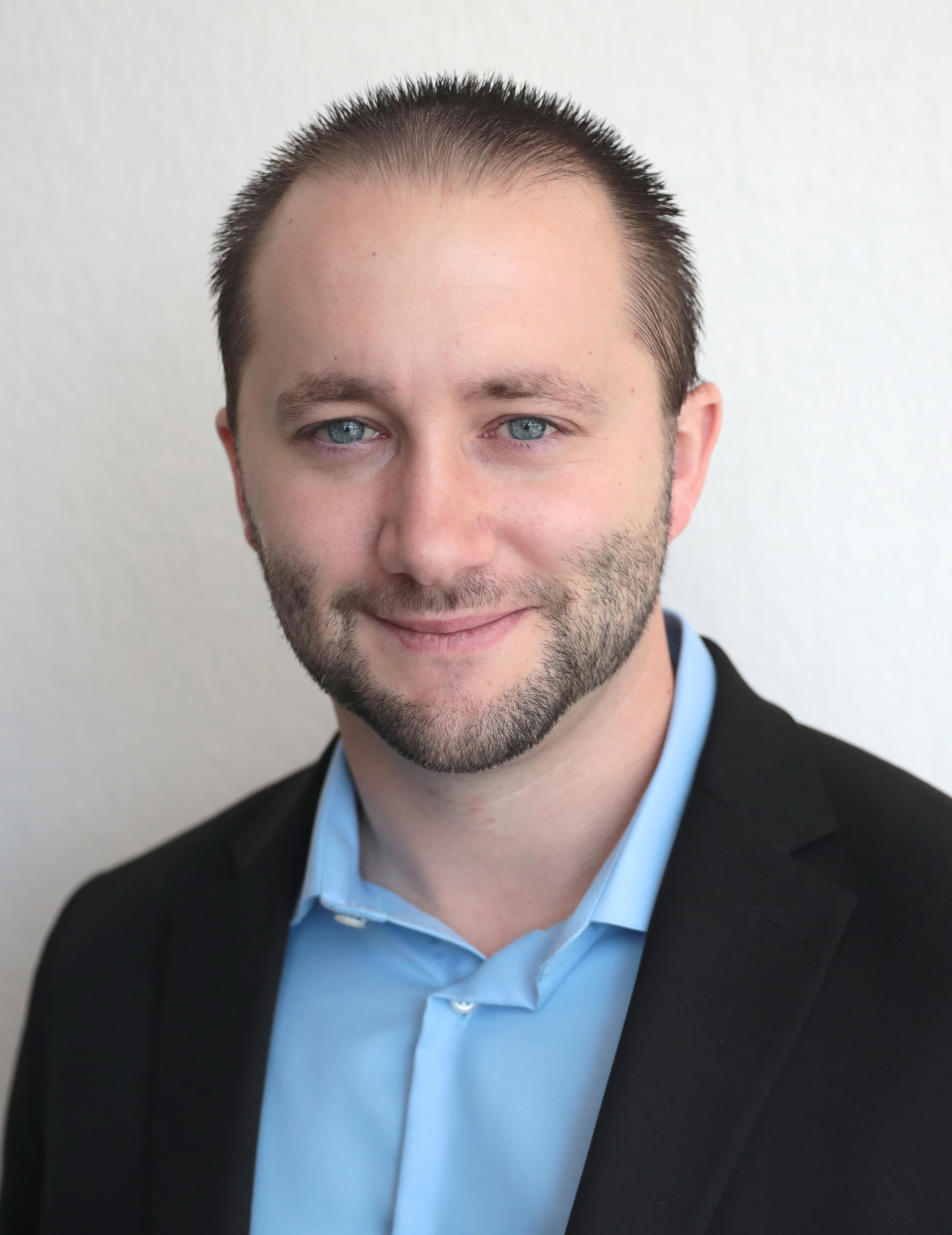
- McGarr in 2022

Member of the Arizona House of Representatives from the 17th district
- In office January 9, 2023 – January 13, 2025 Serving with Rachel Keshel
- Preceded by: Jennifer Pawlik
- Succeeded by: Kevin Volk

Personal details
- Born: New Jersey, US
- Party: Republican
- Website: Campaign Website

Cory McGarr is an American politician and a Republican former member of the Arizona House of Representatives elected to represent District 17 in 2022. He lost his reelection bid in the 2024 general election.

== Elections ==
- 2022 McGarr and Rachel Jones won a five-way contest in the Republican Primary. They went on to defeat Democrats Dana Allmond and Brian Radford in the general election.
