= Arizona Freedom Caucus =

US ultra-conservative political group

- Chair: Jake Hoffman
- Vice Chair: Justin Olson
- Founded: June 2022; 4 years ago
- Ideology: Limited government; American nationalism; National conservatism; Paleoconservatism; Right-wing populism; Trumpism; Factions: Right-libertarianism
- Political position: Right-wing to far-right
- National affiliation: State Freedom Caucus Network
- Seats in the House Republican Conference: 8 / 33 (Note: Total representation may not be shown as some members are anonymous)
- Seats in the State House: 8 / 60
- Seats in the Senate Republican Conference: 1 / 17
- Seats in the State Senate: 1 / 30

The Arizona Freedom Caucus is a legislative caucus of ultra-conservative Republican members in the Arizona legislature that promotes steep spending and tax reductions, limited government power, election reform, and is critical of LGBT+ initiatives. It is affiliated with the State Freedom Caucus Network, and modeled after the Freedom Caucus in the U.S. House of Representatives.

== History ==
The Caucus was created in July 2022 and launched with one-third of House Republican members in its ranks. Founding Chairman, Sen. Jake Hoffman, said the Caucus was formed to fight "the left [and the] establishment GOP that refuses to answer to the will of the people." He said the party will "hold the line" on certain "non-negotiable" issues to ensure that "the most conservative agenda" is achieved in the legislature.

As part of the State Freedom Caucus Network, the Caucus receives "tremendous support" from the national organization and other state caucuses.

== Political positions and involvement ==
=== Intra-party relationship ===
The Caucus' members are seen as more conservative and populist, compared to the traditional membership and current party leadership. Following the 2024 elections, Republicans slightly expanded their majorities in the legislature's two chambers: the House and Senate. This thin majority has allowed the Freedom Caucus to threaten to withhold votes on bills favored by the Republican majority in order to achieve its own political goals. Hoffman refers to this strategy as "pull[ing] them along". The two factions have a contentious relationship. Traditional Republicans, like Rep. Walt Blackman, argue that caucus members engage in "performative outrage" or unrealistic policies.

In 2023, the Republican majority and leadership worked around Freedom Caucus objections to pass a transportation tax bill with the support of Governor Hobbs.

In the summer of 2025, House Freedom Caucus members led bipartisan opposition against a $14 billion budget supported by the Republican Senate and Governor Katie Hobbs, with House caucus members publicly fighting against Republican Senators and their staff. Caucus members argued the budget was too bloated and did not advance enough conservative policies, while the budget's supporters argued the caucus was threatening a government shutdown over provisions that would be vetoed by the Democratic Governor anyway.

Critics, like Arizona journalist Jim Small, have said that the Caucus exercises tremendous power in the legislature, creating a system of "minority rule."

=== Election involvement ===
The Caucus has recruited and supported candidates to run for statewide races in the 2026 election, including Alexander Kolodin and Kimberly Yee. Hoffman said the group's "most important task" is unseating the state's top three elected Democrats in the 2026 elections.

==== 2020 presidential election ====
In April 2024, Hoffman and former caucus member Sen. Anthony Kern were indicted by a grand jury for their role in the Trump fake electors plot. The pair, along with 11 other Arizona Republicans, asserted themselves as the state's electors with the intent to vote for Donald Trump, despite the fact that Joe Biden had won the state and the results had already been certified by the state.

While on the House Municipal Oversight and Elections Committee and the Senate Elections Committee, caucus members invited individuals that rejected the 2020 presidential election results to testify where they advocated election conspiracy theories.

==== Election reform ====
In the run-up to the 2024 elections, the Caucus opposed Proposition 140 (the Make Elections Fair AZ Act), which would have allowed for the possibility of ranked-choice voting in some races. Hoffman said the Caucus wants to make the election system more efficient and secure, believing it to be "vulnerable". In the 2025–26 legislative session, the Caucus supported the Arizona Secure Elections Act, which would have required an ID to vote, required voters using mail-in votes to verify their address each year, and reformed the limits on early voting, among other changes. Hoffman called the bill a "long-needed structural reform."

The Caucus also supported former Rep. Justin Heap in his run to be Maricopa County Recorder, an official that oversees election management in the county. Heap defeated Stephen Richer in the primary, who Kari Lake accused of interfering with the 2022 election results.

=== Immigration and border security ===
The Caucus is highly critical of illegal immigration, and has introduced and supported legislation to strengthen its border with Mexico, increase the rate of deportations, and cooperate with federal immigration officials.

In 2025, Hoffman introduced legislation that would provide a $2,500 bounty to law enforcement officers that assist in a successful deportation, taxing remittances to fund the effort.

The Caucus has expressed support for ICE operations under the Trump administration.

=== LGBT+ issues ===
In 2023, Hoffman criticized Hobbs' executive order providing transgender healthcare for state employees, calling it a waste of taxpayer money. Its members have supported legislation that would restrict drag shows and regulate transgender students' participation in sports. Earlier that year, the caucus called for the firing of Hobbs' Press Secretary, Josselyn Berry, after she posted on X an image of a woman pointing a gun with the caption "[u]s when we see transphobes". The caucus called the post "reprehensible and massively disturbing". Hobbs denounced the post and said she "does not condone violence in any form."

=== Traffic regulation ===
The Caucus has opposed efforts to expand use of speed-regulating devices, like governors in personal vehicles, citing personal freedom concerns. Rep. Rachel Keshel has called such efforts "nanny-state legislation" that would be weaponized against citizens in the future.

== Members ==
The Caucus does not publish its membership, but members are free to disclose their involvement.

=== Current members ===
- Sen. Jake Hoffman – Chairman
- Rep. Rachel Keshel
- Rep. Alexander Kolodin

=== Former members ===
- Rep. Joseph Chaplik – former Vice Chairman
- Sen. Anthony Kern
- Rep. John Fillmore
- Rep. Justin Heap
- Rep. Jacqueline Parker
- Rep. Austin Smith
- Rep. David Marshall
