= Stephen Richer =

American politician and lawyer

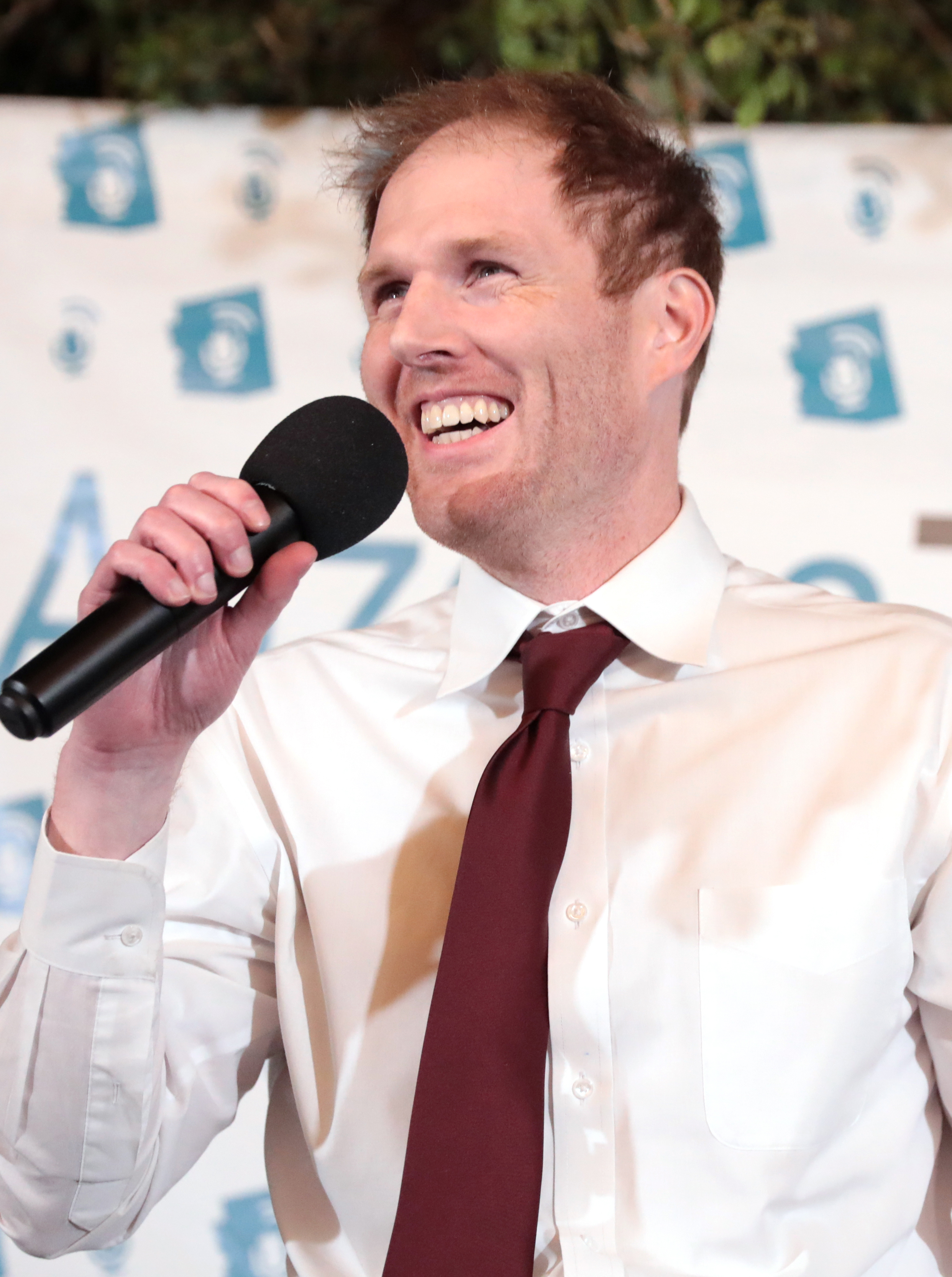

Recorder of Maricopa County, Arizona
- In office January 1, 2021 – January 1, 2025
- Preceded by: Adrian Fontes
- Succeeded by: Justin Heap

Personal details
- Party: Republican
- Education: University of Chicago (JD); Tulane University

Stephen Richer is an American politician and lawyer. He was the 30th Recorder of Maricopa County, Arizona from 2021 to 2025. Richer defeated the Democratic incumbent Adrian Fontes by 4,599 votes in 2020. In November 2024, Richer was defeated in the Republican primary for Maricopa County Recorder by Justin Heap.

== Career ==
=== 2018 election audit ===
In 2019, Richer led a review sponsored by the Arizona Republican Party that produced a 229-page report alleging Maricopa County Recorder Adrian Fontes engaged in partisanship and cited an affidavit from a voter who said he received a ballot pre-filled for Kyrsten Sinema and Greg Stanton, presenting it as anecdotal evidence of broader potential wrongdoing. Richer claimed that the audit did not jump to any hasty conclusions but merely raised "red flags," while criticisms were made of Richer for the inclusion of some claims for which no evidence was provided. Richer's preliminary report recommended examining long wait times, post-Election Day tabulation delays, ballot transport security, a midday software outage, and reports of ballot harvesting, among other things.

=== 2020 election fraud claims ===
By June 2021, Richer reversed his pre-2020 campaign statements promoting election fraud claims, prompting criticism from supporters who said they felt misled by his reversal, while receiving praise from various media outlets. Richer began to repeatedly criticize the audit of the 2020 election in Arizona for being conducted by an amateur group who had never conducted an audit before and for strange and "crazy" conduct. Richer received death threats as a result of his shift on the election fraud issue.

=== 2024 Maricopa County Recorder election ===
Richer was defeated in his bid for re-election in 2024 by Justin Heap in the Republican primary by 32,000 votes. A member of the arch-conservative Arizona Freedom Caucus, Heap explicitly refused to directly claim election fraud in Arizona's prominent 2020 and 2022 statewide races, but repeatedly criticized the administration of Maricopa County elections as "insecure". Heap went on to win the general election and succeed Richer.

== Personal life ==
Richer graduated with a bachelor's degree from Tulane University and obtained a J.D. degree from the University of Chicago. Richer is married to Lindsay Short, whom he met at the University of Chicago Law School. Short later joined the U.S. Attorney’s Office for the District of Arizona as an Assistant U.S. Attorney during Richer's 2020 campaign. Before government service, Short practiced law at Snell & Wilmer, which represented the RNC in a 2020 Arizona election fraud lawsuit before withdrawing on November 12, 2020.

== Legal matters and controversies ==
=== Arizona governor's candidate Kari Lake ===
In 2023, Kari Lake, the Republican nominee for Governor of Arizona in 2022, filed a lawsuit against Richer and other election officials alleging they improperly denied access to election records. Richer later filed a defamation against Kari Lake for claims she allegedly made that Richer was involved in election interference. The Arizona State University First Amendment Legal Clinic joined Lake's defense, arguing that Richer could not satisfy his burden under the law to show his lawsuit “was not motivated to deter, retaliate against, and/or prevent Defendants’ lawful exercise of their free speech rights.”

Richer's defamation case would be resolved through a confidential settlement.

=== Charlie Kirk assassination ===
Following the assassination of Charlie Kirk, Richer shared a viral photo of Tucson middle school teachers in bloody Halloween costumes that had been characterized by Turning Point USA, Kirk's former organization, as mocking his death. The photo turned out to be taken before the assassination and thus was not related to it, but the controversy resulted in the teachers allegedly receiving death threats.

Richer later deleted his post, retracted the claim, and issued an apology.

=== Disbarment hearing for John Eastman ===
Richer testified as a witness in the California State Bar’s disciplinary proceedings against John Eastman, claiming he received threats and that his office was forced to rebut unsubstantiated "vote-flipping" conspiracy theories and to dispute the claims of Doug Logan from the Cyber Ninjas audit that Eastman sought to present in his defense. The State Bar Court later recommended Eastman’s disbarment and Eastman lost his license to practice law as a result.

=== LD29 Republican Party censure ===
In 2024, state representative Austin Smith withdrew from the Republican primary in Legislative District 29, and James Taylor was chosen by district Republicans as the replacement candidate on May 16. His candidacy was then rejected by the Arizona Secretary of State's Office for failing to be submitted before Maricopa County's May 13 deadline for ballot printing. In a lawsuit, the Maricopa County Republican Committee argued that ballots could not have already been printed by the time Taylor's name was put forward, as they had not yet received the ballot proofs they and other county party chairpersons are entitled to receive. Richer responded to the controversy by writing, "[The Maricopa County Election] Board already designed the thousands of ballot styles and sent them to printer. This isn’t a thing.” However, Taylor's name would later appear on the ballots as a result of Maricopa County's settlement in the case. Taylor went on to win the general election.

On June 20, 2024, the LD29 Republican Committee passed a resolution censuring Stephen Richer by a 2/3 vote, specifically criticizing Richer's “This isn’t a thing” tweet about LD29’s replacement vote regard Taylor appearing on the ballot, his alleged refusal to follow Arizona law on party-chosen replacements, and a claimed pattern of selectively following laws and undermining his party.
