= Arizona's 10th legislative district =

American legislative district

- Map of District 10: Approved January 21, 2022
- Senator: Dave Farnsworth (R)
- House members: Justin Heap (R); Barbara Parker (R)
- Registration: 44.15% Republican; 21.79% Democratic; 32.46% Other
- Demographics: 72% White; 3% Black/African American; 2% Native American; 3% Asian; 18% Hispanic
- Population: 235,579
- Voting-age population: 189,789
- Registered voters: 142,562

Arizona's 10th legislative district is one of 30 in the state, consisting of sections of Maricopa County and Pinal County. As of 2023, there are 46 precincts in the district, 43 in Maricopa and three in Pinal, (Note: The three precincts in Pinal cover Apache Junction, Arizona) with a total registered voter population of 142,562. The district has an overall population of 235,579.

Following the 2020 United States redistricting cycle, the Arizona Independent Redistricting Commission (AIRC) redrew legislative district boundaries in Arizona. According to the AIRC, the district is outside of competitive range and considered leaning Republican.

== Political representation ==
The district is represented in the 56th Arizona State Legislature, which convenes from January 1, 2023, to December 31, 2024, by Dave Farnsworth (R-Mesa) in the Arizona Senate and by Justin Heap (R-Mesa) and Barbara Parker (R-Mesa) in the Arizona House of Representatives.

Name	Image	Residence	Office	Party
Dave Farnsworth		Mesa	State senator	Republican
Justin Heap		Mesa	State representative	Republican
Barbara Parker		Mesa	State representative	Republican

== Election results ==
The 2022 elections were the first in the newly drawn district.

=== Arizona Senate ===
2022 Arizona's 10th Senate district election
Party	Candidate	Votes	%
Republican	Dave Farnsworth	53,945	61.07
Independent	Nick Fierro	34,382	38.93
Total votes		88,327	100
Republican hold			

=== Arizona House of Representatives ===
2022 Arizona House of Representatives election, 10th district
Party	Candidate	Votes	%
Republican	Justin Heap	50,024	36.95
Republican	Barbara Parker	49,190	33.33
Democratic	Helen Hunter	36,182	26.72
Total votes		135,396	100.00
Republican hold			
Republican hold			

== See also ==
- List of Arizona legislative districts
- Arizona State Legislature
