= Arizona's 15th legislative district =

American legislative district

- Map of District 15: Approved January 21, 2022
- Senator: Jake Hoffman (R)
- House members: Jacqueline Parker (R); Neal Carter (R)
- Registration: 46.37% Republican; 18.73% Democratic; 33.15% Other
- Demographics: 67% White; 5% Black/African American; 2% Native American; 4% Asian; 20% Hispanic
- Population: 240,028
- Voting-age population: 168,589
- Registered voters: 154,450

Arizona's 15th legislative district is one of 30 in the state, consisting of sections of Maricopa County and Pinal County. As of 2023, there are 45 precincts in the district, 26 in Maricopa and 19 in Pinal, with a total registered voter population of 154,450. The district has an overall population of 240,028.

Following the 2020 United States redistricting cycle, the Arizona Independent Redistricting Commission (AIRC) redrew legislative district boundaries in Arizona. According to the AIRC, the district is outside of competitive range and considered leaning Republican.

== Political representation ==
The district is represented in the 56th Arizona State Legislature, which convenes from January 1, 2023, to December 31, 2024, by Jake Hoffman (R-Queen Creek) in the Arizona Senate and by Jacqueline Parker (R-Mesa) and Neal Carter (R-San Tan Valley) in the Arizona House of Representatives.

Name	Image	Residence	Office	Party
Jake Hoffman		Queen Creek	State senator	Republican
Jacqueline Parker		Mesa	State representative	Republican
Neal Carter		San Tan Valley	State representative	Republican

== Election results ==
The 2022 elections were the first in the newly drawn district.

=== Arizona Senate ===
2022 Arizona's 15th Senate district election
Party	Candidate	Votes	%
Republican	Jake Hoffman	60,850	64.75
Democratic	Alan Smith	33,120	35.25
Total votes		93,970	100
Republican hold			

=== Arizona House of Representatives ===
2022 Arizona House of Representatives election, 15th district
Party	Candidate	Votes	%
Republican	Jacqueline Parker (Incumbent)	58,260	51.95
Republican	Neal Carter (Incumbent)	53,883	48.05
Total votes		112,143	100.00
Republican hold			
Republican hold			

== See also ==
- List of Arizona legislative districts
- Arizona State Legislature
