= Justin Heap =

American politician

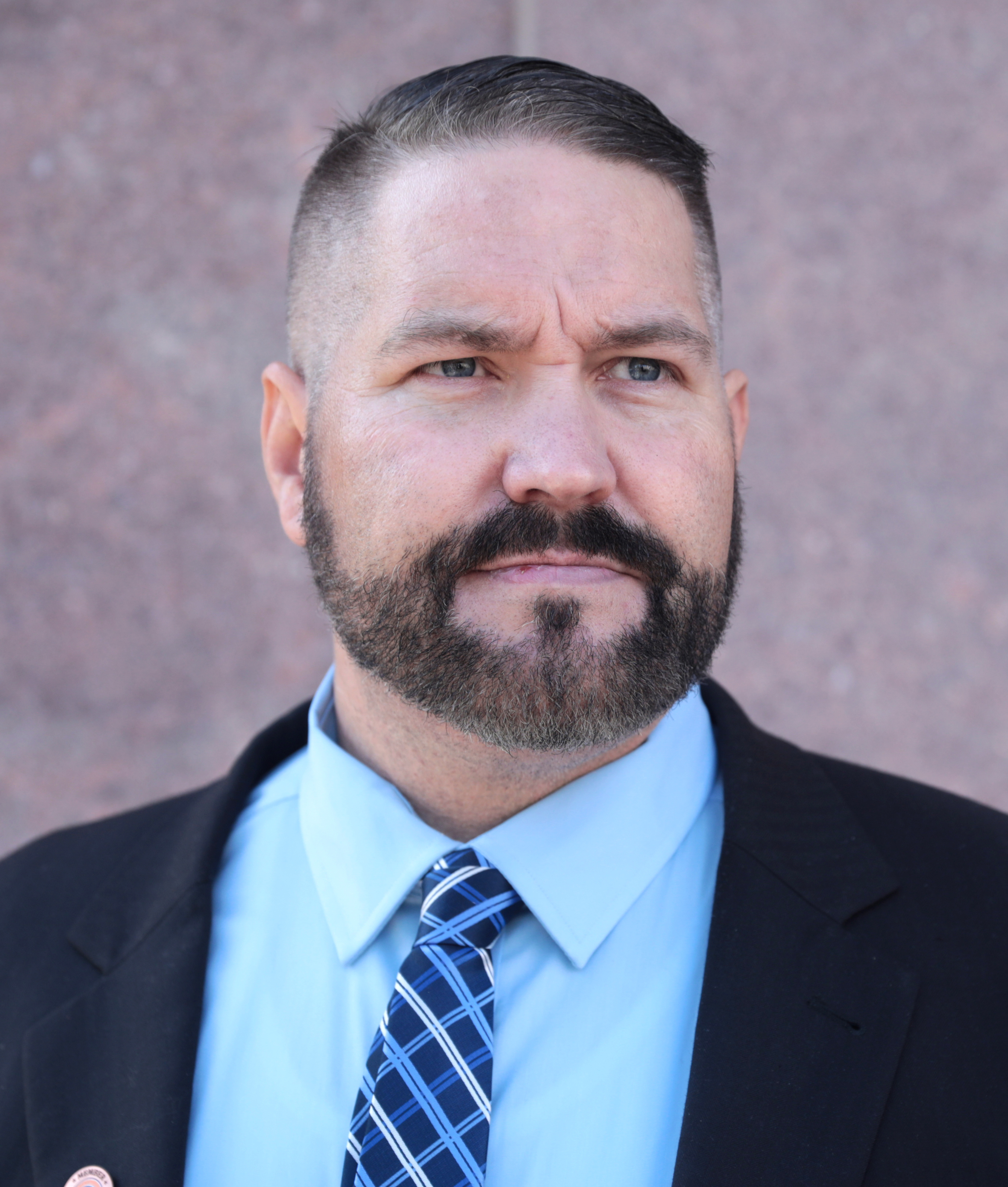
- Heap in 2023

Recorder of Maricopa County
- Incumbent
- Assumed office January 1, 2025
- Preceded by: Stephen Richer

Member of the Arizona House of Representatives from the 10th district
- In office January 9, 2023 – January 13, 2025 Serving with Barbara Parker
- Preceded by: Morgan Abraham
- Succeeded by: Ralph Heap

Personal details
- Party: Republican
- Parent: Ralph Heap
- Education: Arizona State University, Tempe (BA, JD)

Justin Heap is an American politician and Republican who has served as Recorder of Maricopa County since 2025. He is a former member of the Arizona House of Representatives, having represented the 10th district from 2023 to 2025. He was a member of the Arizona Freedom Caucus.

== Political career ==
=== Arizona House of Representatives ===
In 2022, Heap and Barbara Parker were unchallenged in the Republican primary for the 10th district of the Arizona House of Representatives. They went on to defeat Democratic nominee Helen Hunter in the general election. Heap's father, Ralph Heap, succeeded him in the Arizona House of Representatives.

=== Maricopa County Recorder ===
In 2024, Heap decided to run for Maricopa County Recorder, challenging and beating incumbent and fellow Republican Stephen Richer. He went on to win the general election.

== Electoral history ==
=== 2024 ===
2024 Maricopa County Recorder Republican primary election
Party	Candidate	Votes	%
Republican	Justin Heap	161,946	43.3
Republican	Stephen Richer (incumbent)	129,344	34.5
Republican	Donald Hiatt	82,160	21.9
Write-in		929	0.2
Total votes		374,379	100%

2024 Maricopa County Recorder election
Party	Candidate	Votes	%	±%
Republican	Justin Heap	984,866	52.2	+2.1
Democratic	Tim Stringham	903,609	47.8	−2.1
Total votes		1,888,475	100.0	

=== 2022 ===
2022 Arizona House of Representatives election, 10th district
Party	Candidate	Votes	%
Republican	Justin Heap	50,024	36.95
Republican	Barbara Parker	49,190	33.33
Democratic	Helen Hunter	36,182	26.72
Total votes		135,396	100%
Republican hold			
Republican hold			

== Lawsuit against Maricopa County Board of Supervisors ==
In June 2025, Maricopa County Recorder Justin Heap filed a lawsuit against the Board of Supervisors, seeking to regain control over election-related IT, staffing, and resources. Supported by America First Legal, the suit challenged a shared services agreement that restricted the Recorder's authority over voter registration systems and facility access. In April 2026, an Arizona judge ruled in favor of Heap. County supervisors voted to challenge the ruling.
