= Rachel Keshel =

American politician

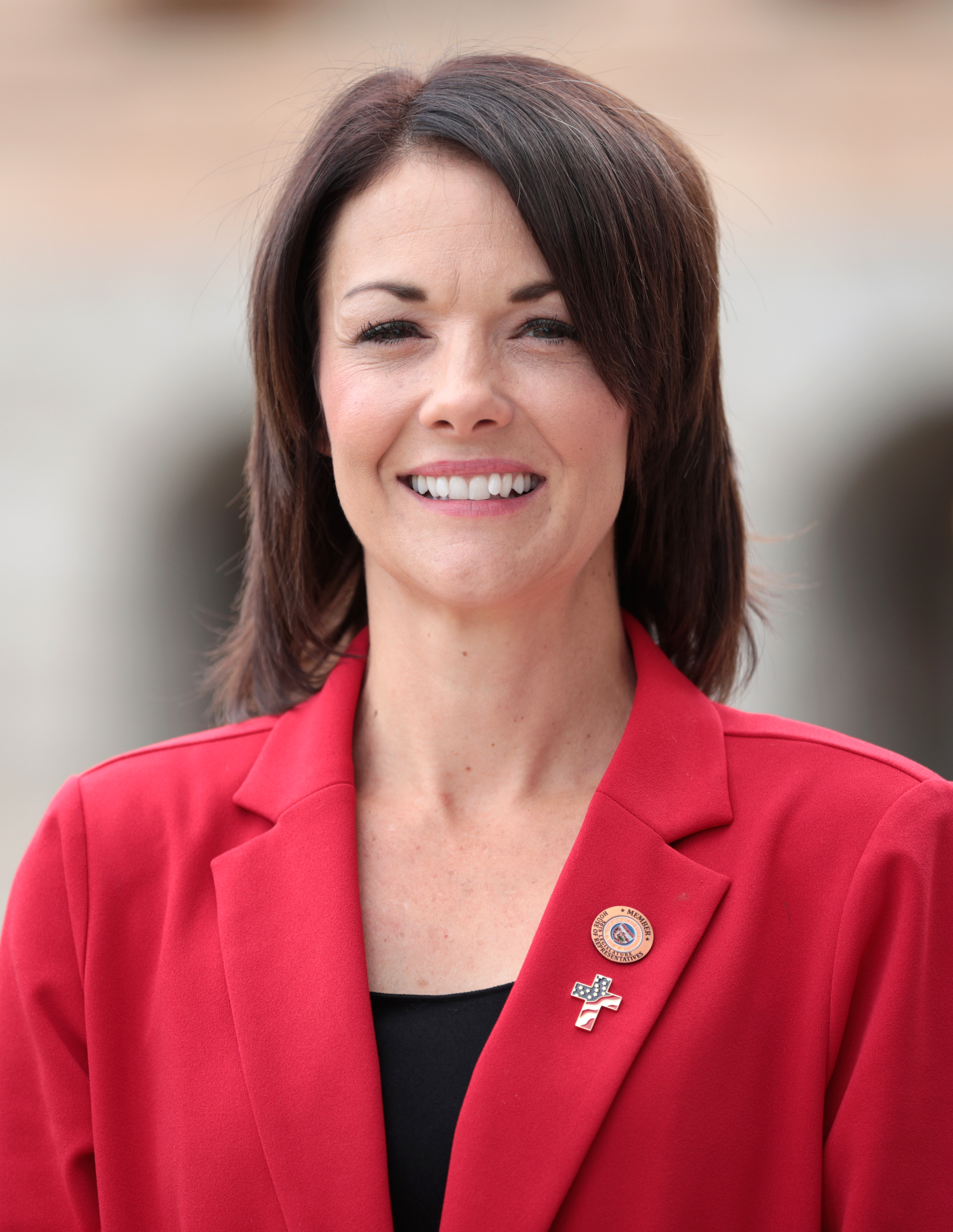
- Keshel in 2023

Member of the Arizona House of Representatives from the 17th district
- Incumbent
- Assumed office January 9, 2023 Serving with Kevin Volk
- Preceded by: Jeff Weninger

Personal details
- Born: Denver, Colorado, U.S.
- Party: Republican
- Spouse: Seth Keshel
- Education: Metropolitan State University of Denver (2002)
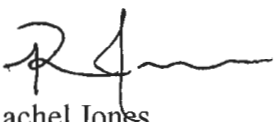
- Signature
- Website: Campaign website

Rachel Keshel (née Jones) is an American politician and a Republican member of the Arizona House of Representatives elected to represent District 17 in 2022. She is a member of the Arizona Freedom Caucus.

Keshel has a degree in business management from Metropolitan State University of Denver and worked for UPS before getting involved in politics.

In February 2024, Keshel introduced a resolution which if passed would request that the Arizona governor "change the manner of the presidential election by appointing the eleven presidential electors to the Republican primary winner to offset the removal of a Republican candidate from the ballot in Colorado and Maine". In support of her resolution, Keshel claimed that the 2020 and 2022 Arizona elections were "illegally administered".

In 2024, Keshel supported state legislation that would ban no-excuse early voting by mail in Arizona (which was ushered into existence in 1991 by Arizona Republicans).

== Elections ==
In 2022, Keshel and Cory McGarr won a five-way contest in the Republican Primary. They went on to defeat Democrats Dana Allmond and Brian Radford in the general election.
