= Maricopa County Board of Supervisors =

Governing body of Maricopa County, Arizona

Type
- Type: Board of Supervisors

Leadership
- Chair: Kate Brophy McGee (R)

Structure
- Seats: 5
- Political groups: Governing party: Republican (4); Opposition: Democratic (1)

Elections
- Last election: November 5, 2024 (5 seats)
- Next election: November 7, 2028 (5 seats)

Website
- www.maricopa.gov/224/Board-of-Supervisors

The Maricopa County Board of Supervisors is the governing body of Maricopa County, a county of over four million in Arizona. The five supervisors are each elected from single-member districts to serve four-year terms. Primary elections and general elections take place in years divisible by four. Vacancies are filled by appointment by remaining members of the board; a member of the same party of the departing member must be selected.

The Board usually meets two Wednesdays every month in the Supervisor's Auditorium at the Maricopa County Complex in Phoenix, Arizona. Members of the public are invited to attend these meetings.

As of January 2026, Kate Brophy McGee is the board's chairman.

== District information ==
- Supervisoral districts as of Jan 1, 2024 redistricting:

- Current term (Jan 1, 2025 - Dec 31, 2028):

Party	District	Name	First elected/ appointed	Area(s) represented
Republican	1	Mark Stewart	2024	Chandler, Gilbert, Mesa, Phoenix, Queen Creek, Scottsdale, Sun Lakes, Tempe
Republican	2	Thomas Galvin	2021	Apache Junction, Carefree, Cave Creek, Fountain Hills, Gilbert, Mesa, Paradise Valley, Phoenix, Scottsdale
Republican	3	Kate Brophy McGee	2024	Anthem, Desert Hills, New River, Paradise Valley, Phoenix
Republican	4	Debbie Lesko	2024	Avondale, Aguila, Buckeye, El Mirage, Glendale, Goodyear, New River, Peoria, Sun City, Sun City West, Surprise, Wickenburg, Youngtown
Democratic	5	Steve Gallardo	2014	Avondale, Buckeye, Gila Bend, Glendale, Goodyear, Guadalupe, Phoenix, Tolleson

== Past members ==
2000 Elections:

Party	District	Name
Republican	1	Fulton Brock
Republican	2	Don Stapely
Republican	3	Andy Kunasek
Republican	4	Jan Brewer
Democratic	5	Mary Rose Wilcox

2004 Elections:

Party	District	Name
Republican	1	Fulton Brock
Republican	2	Don Stapely
Republican	3	Andy Kunasek
Republican	4	Max Wilson
Democratic	5	Mary Rose Wilcox

2008 Elections:

Party	District	Name
Republican	1	Fulton Brock
Republican	2	Don Stapely
Republican	3	Andy Kunasek
Republican	4	Max Wilson
Democratic	5	Mary Rose Wilcox

2012 Elections:

Party	District	Name
Republican	1	Denny Barney
Republican	2	Steve Chucri
Republican	3	Andy Kunasek
Republican	4	Max Wilson (vacated office Mar 11, 2013)
Republican	4	Clint Hickman (appointed Mar 21, 2013)
Democratic	5	Mary Rose Wilcox (vacated office Mar 27, 2014)
Democratic	5	Steve Gallardo (elected Nov 4, 2014)

2016 Elections:

Party	District	Name
Republican	1	Denny Barney (vacated office Feb 1, 2019)
Republican	1	Jack Sellers (appointed Feb 13, 2019)
Republican	2	Steve Chucri
Republican	3	Bill Gates
Republican	4	Clint Hickman
Democratic	5	Steve Gallardo

2020 Elections:

Party	District	Name
Republican	1	Jack Sellers
Republican	2	Steve Chucri (vacated office Nov 5, 2021)
Republican	2	Thomas Galvin (appointed Dec 8, 2021)
Republican	3	Bill Gates
Republican	4	Clint Hickman
Democratic	5	Steve Gallardo

2024 Maricopa County elections

== Departments ==
- Maricopa County Attorney's Office
- Maricopa County Recorder
- Maricopa County Sheriff's Office
- Maricopa County Courthouse
- Maricopa County Library District

== History ==
Maricopa County, created out of Yavapai County, was officially established on February 14, 1871. The county is named after the Maricopa Indians, who were known to have inhabited the area as early as 1775. The geographical boundaries were last modified in 1881 and have not changed since.

The Arizona Territory was created in 1863, and the initial counties were Yavapai, Pima, Yuma, and Mohave counties.

== See also ==
- Board of supervisors
- Maricopa County
