= Paul Petersen (criminal) =

American human smuggler

Paul Petersen is a former public official in Arizona who was convicted of smuggling pregnant women from the Marshall Islands to at least three different states, as part of an adoption scheme. He pled guilty to charges of human smuggling, communication fraud, fraud and other charges in June 2020 and was sentenced to six years in prison in an Arkansas federal case in December 2020. His actions violated a compact between the United States and the Marshall Islands, which bans Marshallese people from traveling to the United States for adoptions unless they have a specific visa.

== Criminal actions ==
A 1983 ruling excludes Marshall Islands citizens from entering the United States for adoption purposes; they are allowed to travel for the purposes of working or visiting.

Petersen used this legal opening and charged couples $35,000 to adopt children from the Islands, and hired individuals to recruit pregnant women to give birth in the United States, then give their children up for adoption. In compensation the women received $10,000 and the cost of their travel was covered. Some adoptive families denied being made aware that Petersen was paying the women involved, and many of the women claim that the only medical care they received was during labor pains or while they were giving birth. Petersen illegally accessed state funded medical benefits, and falsified residency information, to ensure medical care for the women, totaling nearly $814,000 in Arizona Medicaid funds.

One adoptive couple who worked with Petersen went to a home that housed some of the women involved in the scheme. They later told investigators they believed the home to be a part of a "baby mill" and they saw many women sleeping on mattresses on the floor. After the adoptions occurred, the birth mothers either moved to Arkansas or returned to the Marshall Islands.

== Legal action ==
Investigation into Petersen began in December 2018 after a state trooper was tipped off about concerns surrounding the legitimacy of the adoption process by a friend who was considering adopting through Petersen. Utah officials began investigating Petersen after a hospital staffer in Utah called an attorney general tip line in October 2017, with concerns about a possible illegal adoption involving a Marshallese woman at the hospital. Investigators in Utah found an influx of Marshallese women giving birth and placing their babies up for adoption while listing the same house - owned by Petersen - as their place of residence.

Petersen was charged by officials from Utah, Arizona, and Arkansas in October 2019 in relation to allegedly smuggling pregnant women from the Marshall Islands into the United States for the adoption of their children. In Arizona, Petersen was charged with twenty-nine counts of fraudulent schemes and three counts of conspiracy, theft and forgery, along with eleven other felonies including communications fraud, human smuggling and sale of a child in Utah, and nineteen federal charges relating to the illegal entry of individuals to Arkansas.

=== Plea deals ===
Petersen entered guilty pleas in three courts in June 2020. He pleaded guilty in Arizona on June 18; in Utah’s Third District Court on June 19; and in U.S. District Court in Fayetteville, Arkansas on June 24. As part of his plea agreement with the state of Arizona, Petersen paid $650,000 to the Arizona Health Care Cost Containment System (the states Medicaid agency); $11,000 to an unnamed victim; and $18,000 to the Arizona attorney general's office to cover investigative costs. Petersen was sentenced to five years in an Arizona prison. As part of his plea deal in federal court, some federal charges will be dropped after he is sentenced. His federal sentences may be served concurrently with his state sentences.

== Personal life ==
Prior to his conviction, Petersen, a Republican, was elected twice to be the Maricopa County Assessor and an adoption lawyer licensed in Utah, Arizona, and Arkansas. He is a member of the Church of Jesus Christ of Latter-day Saints and served a church mission in the Marshall Islands. After his resignation as county assessor, he was replaced by Eddie Cook, a member of the city council of Gilbert, Arizona.

Petersen's father is former Arizona State Treasurer David Petersen. Petersen married his wife Raquel in 2006. She filed for divorce in 2019 after his indictment.
