= Jake Hoffman (politician) =

American politician

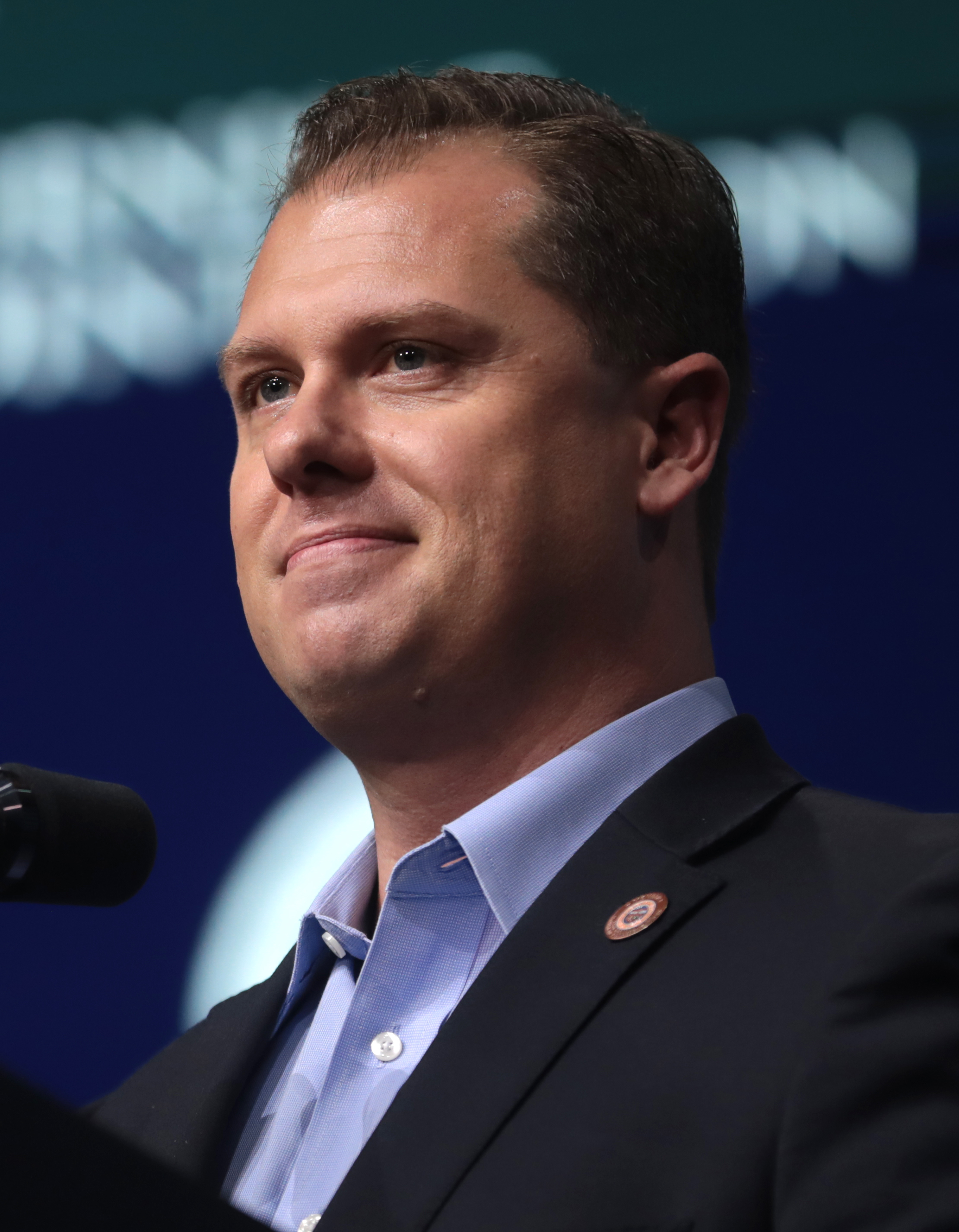

Member of the Arizona Senate from the 15th district
- Incumbent
- Assumed office January 9, 2023
- Preceded by: Nancy Barto

Member of the Arizona House of Representatives from the 12th district
- In office January 11, 2021 – January 9, 2023 Serving with Travis Grantham
- Preceded by: Warren Petersen
- Succeeded by: Stacey Travers

Personal details
- Born: Arizona, U.S.
- Party: Republican
- Education: Arizona State University, Tempe (BS); Bushnell University (MBA)

Jake Hoffman is an American politician and political consultant who has served as an Arizona state senator from Arizona's 15th district since 2023. A member of the Republican Party, he previously represented Arizona's 12th district in the Arizona House of Representatives from 2021 to 2023. He has served as chairman of the Arizona Freedom Caucus since its founding in 2022 and as Arizona's national committeeman to the Republican National Committee since 2024.

Hoffman was elected to the Arizona House after incumbent Republican Warren Petersen decided to run for the Arizona Senate. He and incumbent Travis Grantham won in a two–seat election in 2020, both defeating Democrat Kristin Clark by over 85,000 votes.

Hoffman was also one of eleven Arizona Republicans who signed a certificate in December 2020 purporting to cast Arizona's electoral votes for Donald Trump after Joe Biden had been certified as the winner of the state. He was indicted in 2024 in the Arizona prosecution of fake electors. The indictment was subsequently returned to a grand jury, and the remaining charges were dismissed without prejudice in August 2026, allowing prosecutors to seek new indictments. As of October 2026, Hoffman and other defendants were pursuing appellate relief seeking to prevent renewed prosecution.

== Campaign operative ==
Hoffman is a former spokesperson for Turning Point USA and runs the digital marketing company Rally Forge. In 2020, Rally Forge oversaw a social-media operation for Turning Point Action in which teenagers, including minors, were paid to post coordinated political messages. Some of the posts contained false or misleading information about mail voting and the COVID-19 pandemic. Hoffman confirmed that the participants were classified as contractors and described their activity as people sharing political views they genuinely held.

Following investigations by the social-media companies, Facebook banned Rally Forge and removed accounts and pages connected to the operation, while Twitter permanently suspended Hoffman and hundreds of accounts involved in what it described as platform manipulation and spam. Hoffman was therefore banned from the website Twitter, later renamed X after its purchase by Elon Musk.

The Guardian reported that Rally Forge also formed a group called America Progress Now that posed as a left-wing organization and promoted Green Party candidates online during the 2018 elections. As of October 2023, Hoffman had returned to Twitter under Musk's ownership.

== Elective political career ==
Hoffman served in the Arizona House of Representatives from 2021 through 2022 before being elected to the Arizona Senate from the newly drawn 15th legislative district in 2022. He was reelected to the Senate in 2024.

During his tenure as a state representative, Hoffman was vice-chair of the Arizona House's Committee on Government and Elections. He was also a member of the Committee on Appropriations.

=== Legislative activity ===
Hoffman requested a formal opinion from then-Arizona Attorney General Mark Brnovich on whether criminal activity by cartels and gangs at the Arizona–Mexico border could constitute an "invasion" for purposes of the Constitution of the United States. Brnovich issued an opinion in February 2022 concluding that the activity could qualify as an invasion and that Arizona possessed constitutional authority to defend itself against it. Legal scholars criticized the theory as inconsistent with the constitutional meaning of invasion.

In 2022, Hoffman sponsored HB2787, a bill to divide Maricopa County into three new counties. Critics said his proposal was intended to punish election officials in Maricopa County for not overturning the 2020 election results based on Trump's false claims of fraud. Hoffman and other supporters said the county had become too large in area and population. He reintroduced the legislation in 2024, again citing Maricopa County's large area and population.

In 2024, Hoffman sponsored SB 1279, a bill to prohibit Satanic displays on public property, while still allowing other religious symbols. The bill was introduced in reaction to the Satanic Temple's displays. Opponents who testified against the bill stated that it would violate multiple clauses of the First Amendment because it mandated viewpoint discrimination. The bill passed the Senate Committee on Government on a 5–1 party-line vote, but was defeated on the Senate floor, with Republican senators Ken Bennett and J. D. Mesnard voting no.

During the 56th Arizona Legislature, Hoffman chaired the Senate Committee on Government and the Committee on Director Nominations, served as vice chair of the Committee on Appropriations, and was a member of the Committee on Transportation, Technology, and Missing Children. In the subsequent legislature, he continued to chair the Government and Director Nominations committees and served as a member of the Finance Committee.

In 2024, legislation authorizing a memorial at the Arizona Capitol to Don Bolles, an Arizona Republic investigative reporter who covered the legislature and was killed in a car bombing, did not receive a hearing in the Government Committee while Hoffman was chairman. Asked about not hearing the bill, Hoffman cited "lots of important business."

On January 22, 2025, Hoffman was pulled over by an Arizona Highway Patrol state trooper for allegedly driving 89 mph in a 65 mph zone. The trooper did not issue a citation, with the Arizona Department of Public Safety stating that Hoffman was protected at the time by the legislative immunity section of the Arizona State Constitution.

=== Arizona Freedom Caucus and Republican National Committee ===
In July 2022, Hoffman was selected as the founding chairman of the Arizona Freedom Caucus, part of the State Freedom Caucus Network and modeled on the Freedom Caucus in the U.S. House of Representatives. He remained chairman in 2026.

In April 2024, shortly after his indictment in the Arizona fake-elector case, the Arizona Republican Party elected Hoffman as one of its representatives to the Republican National Committee, serving as the state's national committeeman. Despite his indictment for his part in the scheme, Hoffman was elected as the National Committeeman to the Republican National Committee.

=== Attempts to overturn the 2020 United States presidential election ===
After Democratic candidate Joe Biden won Arizona in the 2020 election, Hoffman was part of a slate of 11 Republicans who attempted to submit documents to the National Archives and Records Administration stating that Arizona had been won by Republican candidate Donald Trump. The group claimed to be Arizona's duly elected presidential electors, although Biden had won the state by 10,457 votes and the election results had already been certified by the state.

As one of the Republican electors, Hoffman was indicted by an Arizona grand jury in April 2024. He pleaded not guilty to charges of conspiracy, fraudulent schemes and practices, fraudulent schemes and artifices, and forgery.

In May 2025, a Maricopa County Superior Court judge ordered the case returned to the grand jury, finding that prosecutors had not adequately explained the federal Electoral Count Act to the grand jurors in light of the defendants' contention that the law provided a lawful basis for their conduct. The Arizona Court of Appeals declined to take up the prosecution's challenge, and in June 2026 the Arizona Supreme Court also declined to reverse the ruling.

The Attorney General's Office subsequently asked that the pending indictment be dismissed because it could not complete the new grand-jury presentation within the applicable deadline. On August 7, 2026, the court dismissed the charges without prejudice, permitting prosecutors to seek a new indictment, and declined requests from defendants to bar a renewed prosecution.

Several defendants sought appellate review of their claims under Arizona's anti-SLAPP law, which the trial court had deemed moot after dismissing the indictment. In October 2026, Hoffman joined notices of appeal seeking review of that issue.
