= Barbara Parker (Arizona politician) =

American politician

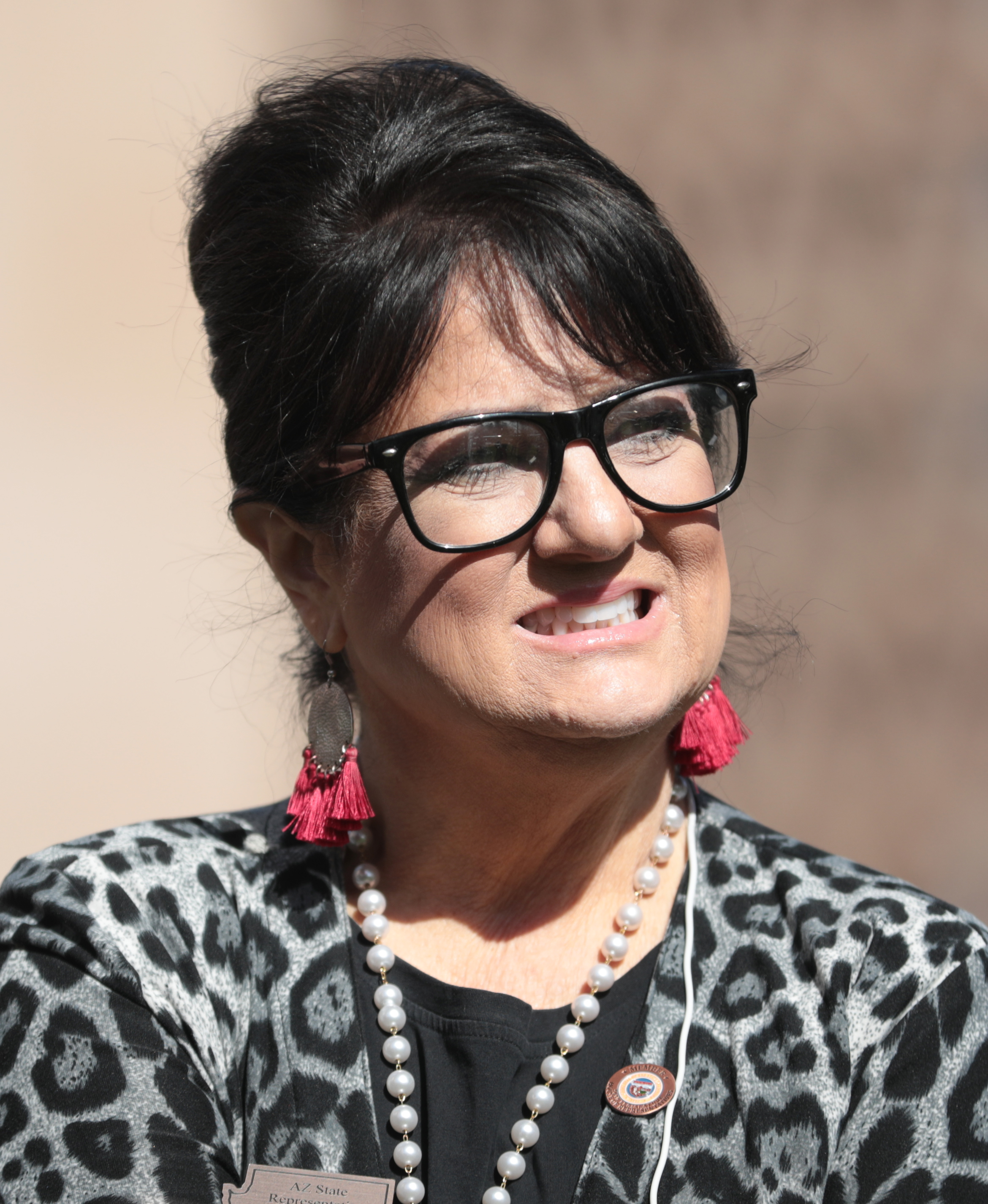

Member of the Arizona House of Representatives from the 10th district
- In office January 9, 2023 – January 13, 2025 Serving with Justin Heap
- Preceded by: Domingo DeGrazia
- Succeeded by: Justin Olson

Personal details
- Party: Republican
- Children: Jacqueline Parker
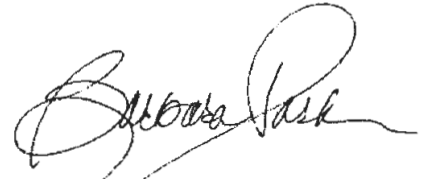
- Signature
- Website: Campaign Website

Barbara Parker Rowley is an American politician and Republican former member of the Arizona House of Representatives elected to represent District 10 in 2022.

== Elections ==
- 2022 Parker and Justin Heap were unchallenged in the Republican Primary, and they went on to defeat Democratic nominee Helen Hunter in the general election.
