= Steve Gallardo =

American politician

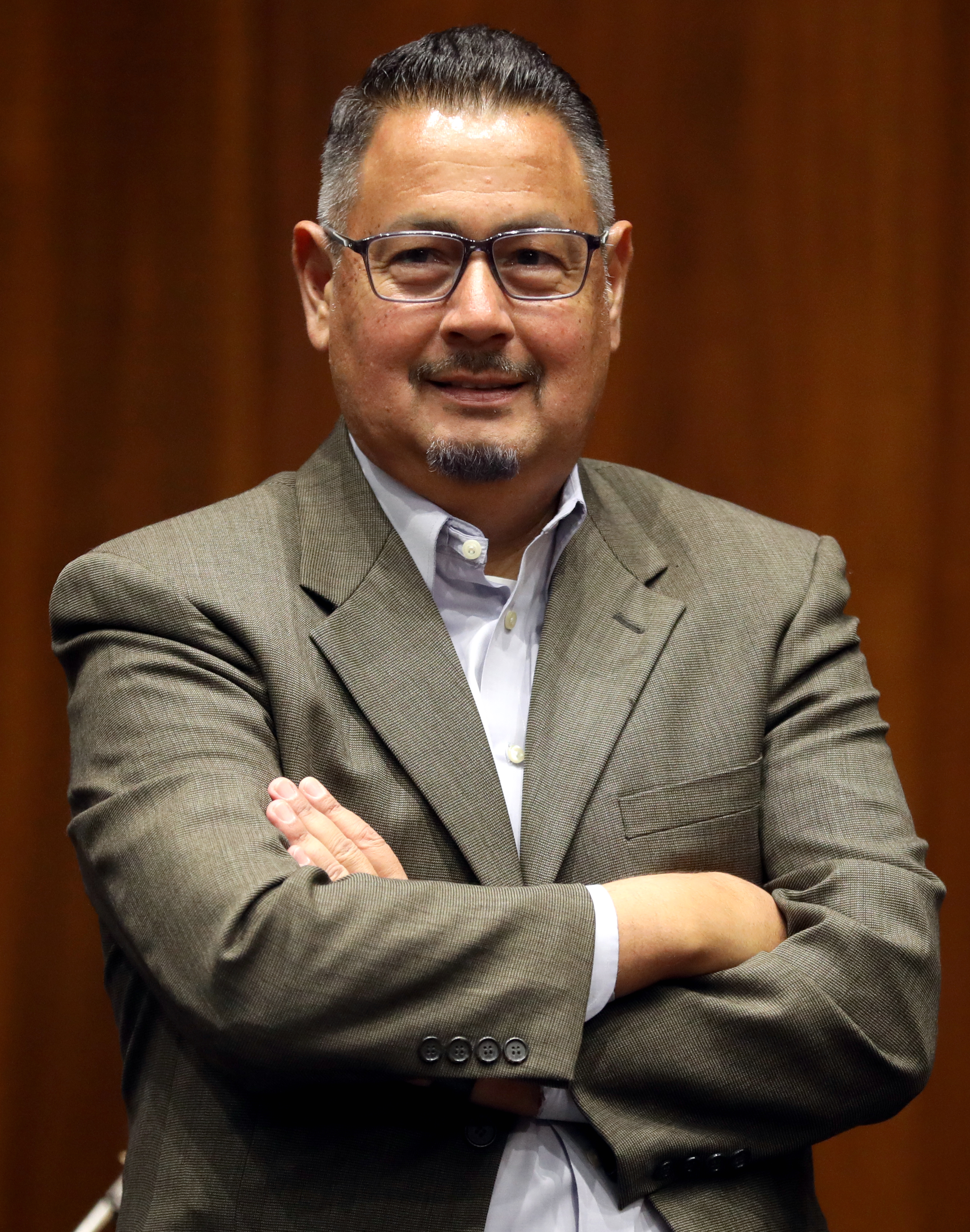
- Gallardo in 2024

Member of the Maricopa County Board of Supervisors from the 5th district
- Incumbent
- Assumed office January 5, 2015

Member of the Arizona Senate from the 29th district
- In office January 10, 2013 – January 5, 2015
- Succeeded by: Martín Quezada

Member of the Arizona Senate from the 13th district
- In office January 10, 2011 – January 5, 2013

Member of the Arizona House of Representatives from the 13th district
- In office January 12, 2003 – January 12, 2009
- Preceded by: Gabby Giffords
- Succeeded by: Anna Tovar

Personal details
- Born: October 25, 1968 (age 57) Phoenix, Arizona, U.S.
- Party: Democratic

Steve Michael Gallardo (born October 25, 1968) is an American politician from the state of Arizona. A member of the Democratic Party, Gallardo serves on the Maricopa County Board of Supervisors representing the 5th district. He previously served in the Arizona State Senate, representing the 13th district from 2011 through 2015 and in the Arizona House of Representatives from 2003 through 2009.

== Early life and career ==
Gallardo, a fourth generation Arizonan, was born on October 25, 1968, to Jose Luis Gallardo and Alice Carrillo. He grew up in Maryvale, Arizona. He attended grade school at Starlight Park Elementary School in the Cartwright Elementary School District and Trevor G. Browne High School in the Phoenix Union High School District. He continued his education at Rio Salado Community College. Gallardo served as Maricopa County Campaign Finance Director and Training Officer for 14 years.

Janet Napolitano, former Governor of Arizona, appointed Gallardo to the Arizona Civil Rights Advisory Board, where he served from 1998 through 2002. In 2001, Gallardo was appointed to the Maryvale Village Planning Committee by the Phoenix City Council. Gallardo served on the Governing Board of the Cartwright Elementary School District beginning in 2001. He served through 2004, and was elected in 2010 to another four-year term. He also served on the Governing Board of the Phoenix Union High School District from 2004 through 2008.

== State legislature ==
In February 2002, Gallardo resigned from Maricopa County Election Department and announced his candidacy for the Arizona House of Representatives. He was elected in November 2002 to represent Legislative District 13 covering areas of Maryvale, Glendale, Tolleson, Cashion, and Avondale. Gallardo was elected to the Arizona House of Representatives in 2002, 2004, 2006 and 2008. In January 2009, Gallardo stepped down from the Arizona House of Representatives to work for a consulting firm. Shortly after the enactment of Arizona SB 1070, the broadest and strictest anti-illegal immigration measure in the U.S., he announced his candidacy for Arizona State Senate for Legislative District 13. He was elected in November 2010 and reelected in 2012. In 2012, he sponsored legislation to repeal the anti-illegal-immigration legislation.

In 2011, Gallardo was one of more than two dozen Arizona politicians who accepted free tickets to attend college football games, known locally as the Fiesta Bowl. He also accepted free tickets to NASCAR's Phoenix International Raceway Subway 500. He then became a crusader to ban legislators from accepting such gifts from lobbyists, though defended the practice in the absence of the law's enactment.

In January 2013, Gallardo introduced a series of bills to enhance the rights of LGBT persons by ending the state's ban on same-sex marriage, prohibiting discrimination on the basis of sexual orientation or gender identity in employment, and ending the state's preference for married persons over single persons in adoption. In October 2013, Gallardo was elected Minority Whip of the Arizona Senate by his Democratic colleagues.

In December 2013, Gallardo became one of the plaintiffs in Gallardo v. Arizona, a lawsuit that challenges the addition of two at-large seats to the Maricopa Community College District as a violation of the state constitution.

In 2014, Gallardo again introduced legislation to repeal Arizona's anti-illegal-immigration law. He noted that the legislation he wanted to repeal took four years to pass and "It may take us longer to get it repealed. But we are not going to stop until we get it repealed."

Following the passage of Arizona SB 1062 in February 2014, which sought to allow businesses to deny services to LGBT people, especially same-sex couples, based on religious beliefs, and its veto by Governor Jan Brewer, Gallardo came out as gay. He referred to the bill as a "game changer," and noted the national controversy surrounding its passage, as prompted his decision to come out.

== 2014 congressional candidacy ==
Gallardo was a candidate for the United States House of Representatives for Arizona's 7th congressional district in the 2014 elections, following the retirement of incumbent Ed Pastor. He then withdrew from the race in May to stand for the seat vacated by fellow house candidate Mary Rose Wilcox on the Maricopa County Board of Supervisors.
