= Jacqueline Parker (politician) =

American politician

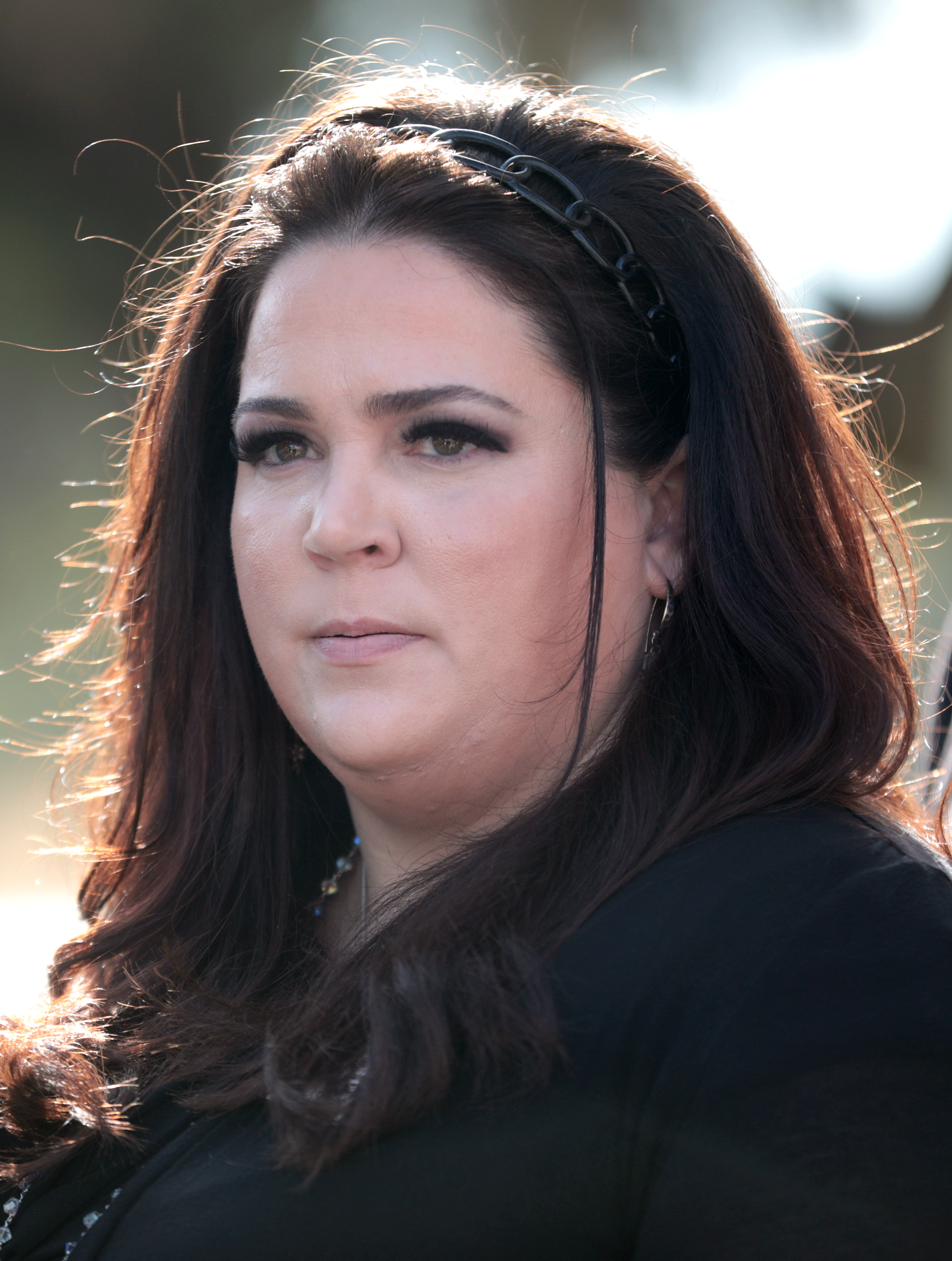
- Parker in 2023

Member of the Arizona House of Representatives from the 15th district
- In office January 9, 2023 – January 13, 2025 Serving with Neal Carter
- Preceded by: Steve Kaiser
- Succeeded by: Michael Way

Member of the Arizona House of Representatives from the 16th district
- In office January 11, 2021 – January 9, 2023
- Preceded by: Kelly Townsend
- Succeeded by: Teresa Martinez

Personal details
- Born: Mesa, Arizona
- Party: Republican
- Relations: Barbara Parker, mother
- Education: Brigham Young University; University of San Francisco; Arizona State University
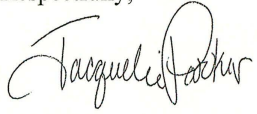
- Signature

Jacqueline Parker is an American politician who served as a member of the Arizona House of Representatives from the 16th legislative district from 2021 to 2025. She is a member of the Republican Party. She was a member of the Arizona Freedom Caucus.

== Political career ==
Before being elected to office, Parker was an assistant to Commissioner Justin Olson of the Arizona Corporation Commission. Parker was elected to the seat in the Arizona House of Representatives after incumbent Kelly Townsend, also a Republican, decided to run for Arizona Senate. She and incumbent John Fillmore, a fellow Republican, won in a two–seat election in 2020, defeating Democrat Helen Hunter; Parker received 74,784 votes, Fillmore 68,760, and Hunter 47,071. The district covers parts of Maricopa and Pinal counties.

As a Representative-elect after the 2020 presidential election, Parker was one of 22 Arizona Republican legislators who signed a document urging Congress to accept fraudulent Republican electoral votes.

=== 2021 session ===
In 2021, Parker proposed a bill to allow people to have loaded guns in their vehicles on school grounds. The legislation passed the House on a 31–28 party-line vote.

Parker introduced a bill to give Arizona Attorney General Mark Brnovich the power to sue the Arizona Board of Regents over tuition at Arizona public universities. Brnovich previously sued the Board in 2017; the suit was unsuccessful, as the Arizona Supreme Court ruled in November 2020 that Brnovich lacked the power to maintain the suit against the board. Parker's bill failed after a single Republican, Michelle Udall, joined all the Democrats in voting no.

Parker introduced a bill in 2021 to give the Legislature more power over the Arizona Corporation Commission through forcing the state attorney general to investigate. The bill was introduced over a dispute over the role of the Commission versus the Legislature over powers to regulate utilities and set energy policy. Democratic members of the Commission favored renewable portfolio standard, while Republican members of the Commission and Republican Governor Doug Ducey took steps to block the commission from adopting such standards. Democratic Commissioner Anna Tovar suggested that the bill violated the Arizona Constitution, and that Parker had introduced it at the behest of her former boss, Commissioner Olson, or Ducey.

Parker is anti-abortion. In 2024, she voted against a legislative proposal to repeal a 1864 law that imposed a near-total ban on abortion in Arizona.
