= Adrian Fontes =

American politician and attorney (born 1970)

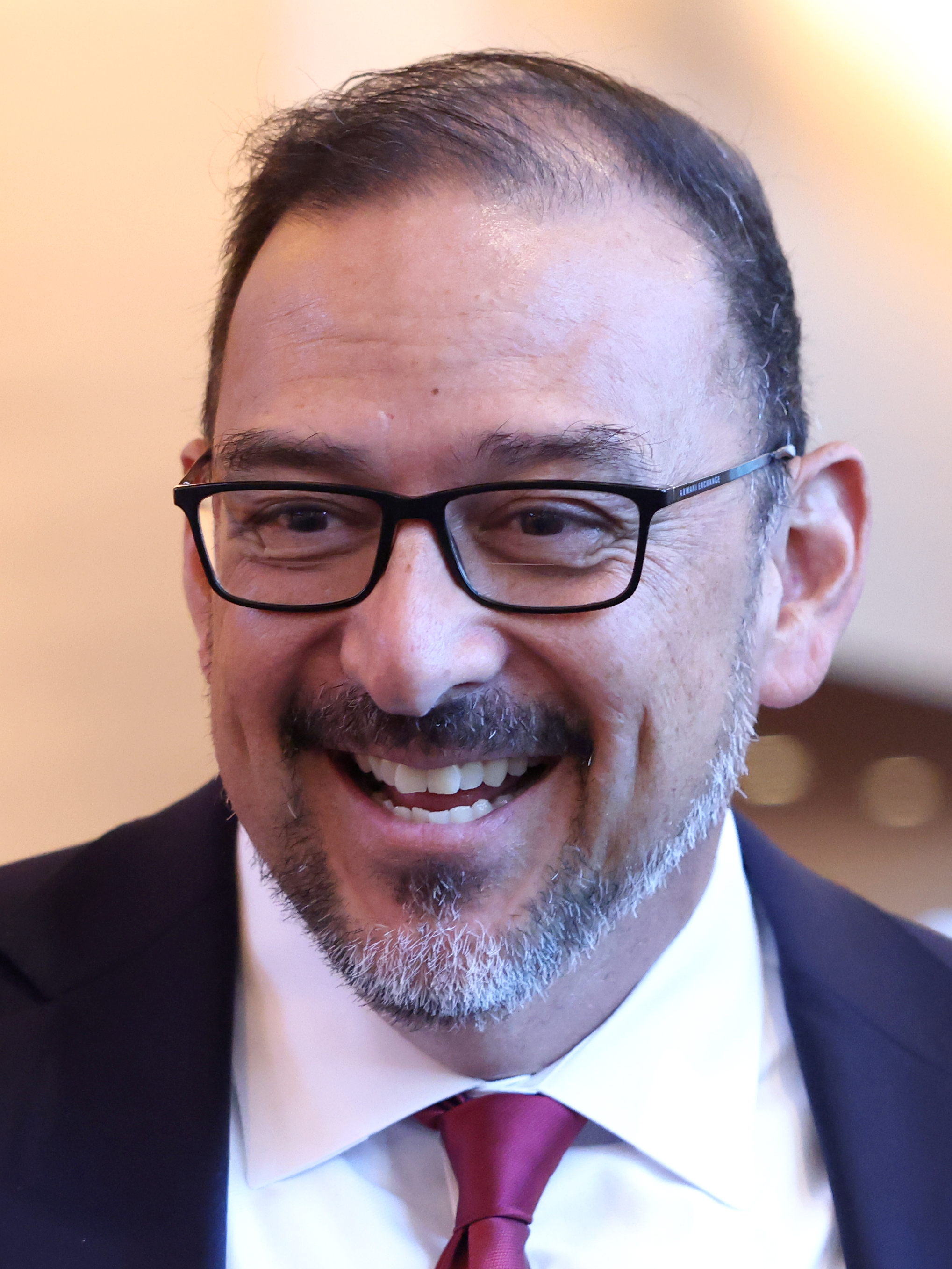
- Fontes in 2025

22nd Secretary of State of Arizona
- Incumbent
- Assumed office January 2, 2023
- Governor: Katie Hobbs
- Preceded by: Katie Hobbs

Recorder of Maricopa County
- In office January 1, 2017 – January 1, 2021
- Preceded by: Helen Purcell
- Succeeded by: Stephen Richer

Personal details
- Born: Adrian Paulino Fontes; April 3, 1970 (age 56) Nogales, Arizona, U.S.
- Party: Democratic
- Children: 3
- Relatives: Cisco Aguilar (cousin)
- Education: Arizona State University, Tempe (BA); University of Denver (JD)
- Website: Office website Campaign website

Military service
- Allegiance: United States
- Branch/service: United States Marine Corps
- Years of service: 1992–1996

Adrian Paulino Fontes (born April 3, 1970) is an American politician and attorney serving as the Secretary of State of Arizona since 2023. He previously served as the Maricopa County Recorder from 2017 to 2021. He is a member of the Democratic Party.

Fontes was first elected Secretary of State in 2022.

== Early life and career ==
Fontes was born and raised in Nogales, Arizona. His family has lived in southern Arizona for more than 300 years, even before Arizona became a state. He and Cisco Aguilar, neighboring secretary of state of Nevada, are distant cousins. Fontes served in the United States Marine Corps from 1992 to 1996, where he taught a marksmanship course. He earned his bachelor's degree in Communications from Arizona State University in 1998. When he returned, he attended the Sturm College of Law at the University of Denver and graduated in 2000 with a Juris Doctor degree.

Fontes has served as a prosecutor with the Denver District Attorney's Office, Maricopa County Attorney's Office and the Arizona Attorney General's Office, and as an attorney in private practice where he notably represented individuals charged with running guns and missiles to the Sinaloa Cartel.

== Maricopa County Recorder (2017–2021) ==
=== Elections ===
==== 2016 ====
Fontes ran for Maricopa County Recorder against 28-year incumbent Helen Purcell. Fontes announced his candidacy the day after Maricopa County's 2016 presidential preference election, which was perceived by some as having been mismanaged by Purcell due to the reduction in the number of polling places in the county, causing long lines that stretched for blocks and left some voters waiting for hours. Latino community leaders raised concerns about voter suppression when areas with predominantly Latino populations had one or no polling places open during Arizona's presidential preference election. On October 27, 2016, the Arizona Republic newspaper endorsed Fontes. On November 14, 2016, Purcell conceded the race. Fontes was the first Democrat to be elected Maricopa County Recorder in over 50 years.

==== 2018 ====
In 2018, as part of an organized effort by the GOP to raise suspicions about voter fraud, the Arizona GOP commissioned attorney Stephen Richer to conduct an "independent audit," which aired baseless and unsubstantiated insinuations about Soros and Fontes.

==== 2020 ====
Fontes ran for re-election in 2020, losing by fewer than 5,000 votes to Republican candidate Stephen Richer. Once Stephen Richer won the 2020 election, he backpedaled and distanced himself from the Soros and Fontes voter fraud conspiracies he spread while campaigning against Fontes.

=== Tenure ===
As Maricopa County Recorder, Fontes piloted the use of vote centers, where any voter in the county could cast a ballot regardless of precinct. In the November 2018 election, Maricopa County operated 40 vote centers. Fontes also expanded early voting options in Maricopa County.

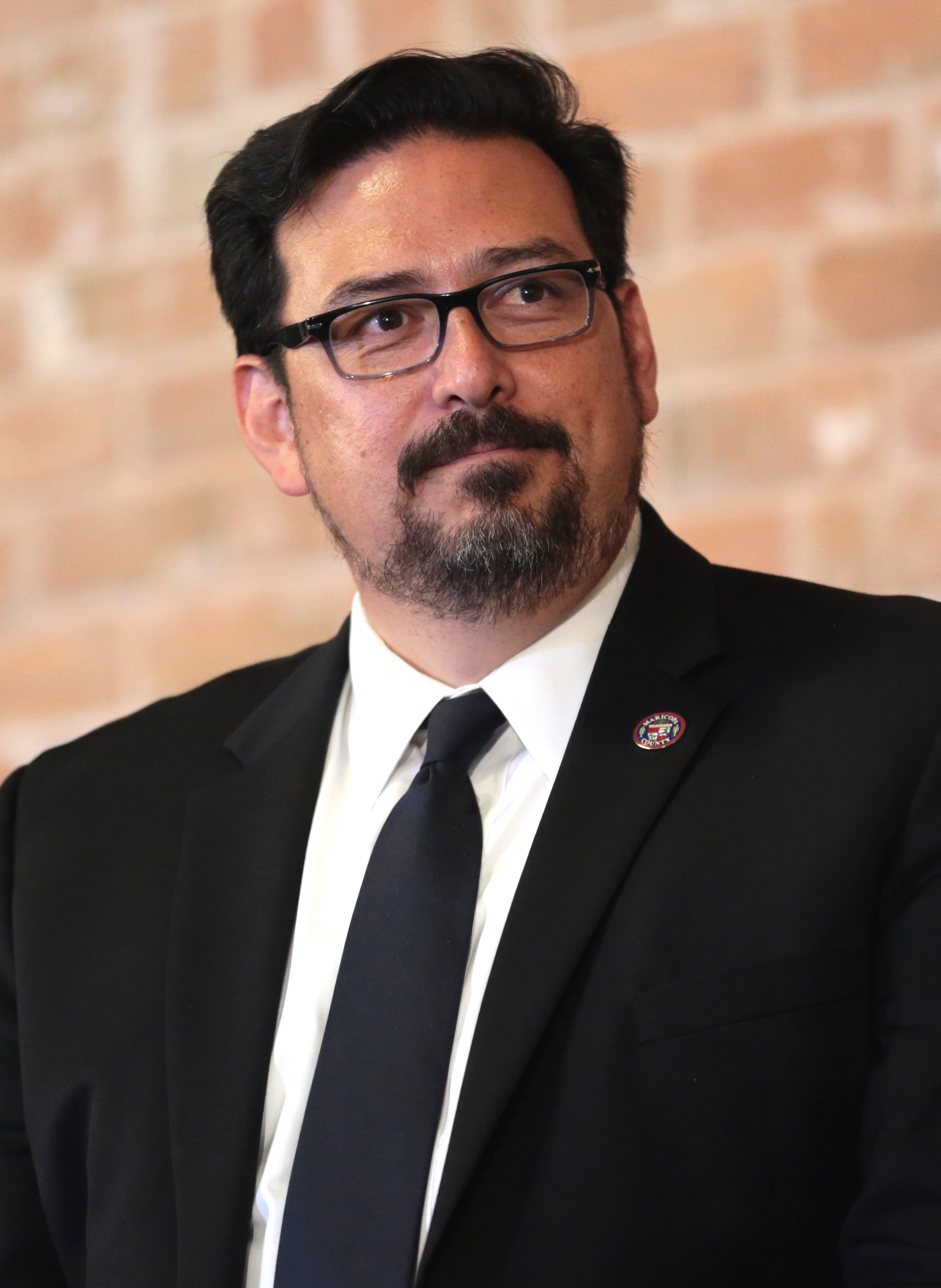
Fontes in 2017

As Maricopa County recorder he attempted to mail additional ballots in his own party’s presidential preference election to all eligible voters in the county, even those who had not requested ballots stating Corona virus concerns as reasoning. He was subsequently issued a temporary restraining order after a court found it illegal to do so despite already printing 200,000 ballots.

As the County Recorder, Fontes oversaw the counting of ballots in Maricopa County's elections in 2020. While the ballots were being counted in the Maricopa County Recorder's Office, protesters gathered outside over the course of several days, including conspiracy theorist Alex Jones. Fontes worried that there would be an invasion into the building, and met with sheriff's department and other law-enforcement agencies about establishing a secure perimeter around the building where Fontes' staff was counting ballots but was determined there was no real threat. Due to the unrest Maricopa County Recorder's Office, Fontes and his family packed "go-bags" in case they needed to leave their home on short notice, found back-up housing, and his three children evacuated for several days. Fontes has claimed that Jake Angeli, the "QAnon Shaman," was one of the protestors at the Recorders Office. After the 2020 election, Fontes joined Pima County Recorder-elect Gabriella Cázares-Kelly's transition team as an interim chief deputy recorder after losing his re-election.

=== Criticism of 2021 Maricopa County election audit ===
Fontes was a vocal critic of the Maricopa County election audit. On July 28, 2021, Fontes was one of several politicians, experts and election officials who spoke about voter suppression, subversion, and election worker intimidation and who testified before the United States Congress Committee on House Administration. Fontes testified: "I strongly support legislative efforts to protect election officials in Arizona and across the country from harassment, intimidation, threats and political interference, so that they can safely perform their duties to serve voters and protect election integrity."

== Arizona Secretary of State (2023–present) ==
On July 6, 2021, Fontes announced his candidacy for the 2022 Arizona Secretary of State election. On August 4, 2022, Fontes was declared the winner of the Democratic primary. Fontes received 52.5% of the vote, while his opponent Reginald Bolding received 47.5%. Fontes faced Republican party nominee, Arizona Representative Mark Finchem in the general election. Finchem had contended without evidence that Maricopa County’s 2020 election was tainted by fraud, backed the state Senate’s discredited review of the election done by the state Senate and was part of a lawsuit which attempted to block the use of vote counting machines in state elections. Fontes defeated Finchem in the November 8 general election.

== Electoral history ==
=== Maricopa County Recorder ===
==== 2016 ====
Maricopa County Recorder general election, 2016
Party	Candidate	Votes	%	±%
Democratic	Adrian Fontes	704,916	50.53%	
Republican	Helen Purcell (incumbent)	690,088	49.47%	
Majority		14,828	1.06%	
Democratic gain from Republican		Swing		

==== 2020 ====
Maricopa County Recorder Democratic primary election, 2020
Party	Candidate	Votes	%
Democratic	Adrian Fontes	359,527	100%
Majority		359,527	100%

Maricopa County Recorder general election, 2020
Party	Candidate	Votes	%	±%
Republican	Stephen Richer	944,953	50.1%	+0.63%
Democratic	Adrian Fontes (incumbent)	940,354	49.8%	−0.73%
Write-in		1,570	0.1%	
Majority		4,599	0.3%	
Republican gain from Democratic		Swing		

=== Arizona Secretary of State ===
==== 2022 ====
Arizona Secretary of State Democratic primary election, 2022
Party	Candidate	Votes	%
Democratic	Adrian Fontes	302,681	52.5%
Democratic	Reginald Bolding	273,815	47.5%
Majority		28,866	5.0%
Turnout		576,496	44.64%

Arizona Secretary of State election, 2022
Party	Candidate	Votes	%	±%
Democratic	Adrian Fontes	1,320,618	52.4%	+2.0%
Republican	Mark Finchem	1,200,411	47.6%	−2.0%
Majority		120,207	4.8%	+4.0%
Turnout		2,592,312	62.56%	−0.21%
Democratic hold		Swing		

== See also ==
- Hispanics in the United States Marine Corps

Political offices
Preceded by Katie Hobbs	Secretary of State of Arizona; 2023–present	Incumbent
