= Helen Purcell =

County Recorder for Maricopa County, Arizona

Maricopa County Recorder
- In office January 3, 1989 – January 1, 2017
- Preceded by: Keith Poletis
- Succeeded by: Adrian Fontes

Personal details
- Born: Helen Purcell Topeka, Kansas, U.S.
- Party: Republican
- Occupation: Real estate trust officer

Helen Purcell served seven terms as the County Recorder for Maricopa County, Arizona. First elected in 1988, Purcell is a member of the Republican Party, and served until 2017.

Purcell faced significant controversy following Arizona's 2016 presidential primary in which voters faced long wait times to vote due to a significant reduction in polling places from several hundred to 60. Purcell also received criticism from a 2014 incident where a candidate was left off the ballot. Another controversy occurred in April 2016 when Purcell's office was forced to reprint 700,000 ballots after a mistake was discovered on the Spanish-language version of the ballots.

Purcell faced a serious primary challenge in 2016, narrowly winning the Republican nomination by 185 votes. She lost to Democratic challenger Adrian Fontes in the general election.

== Early career ==
Purcell began her career with T.J.Bettes Mortgage Company in Texas. Moving to Phoenix in 1964, Purcell became a real estate trust officer with the firm Stewart Title & Trust.

== 2016 election controversy ==
Arizona's Presidential Primary election saw historically long lines, with some voters waiting six hours to vote. After initially blaming voters for the long lines, Purcell took much of the blame for the delay after reducing the number of polling places to 60, instead of the 200 used in the 2012 Presidential election.

Within a day after the election took place, a petition on the White House petitions site asking the Department of Justice to investigate voter suppression and election fraud in Arizona reached its goal of 100,000 signatures in a record amount of time. Members of Arizona's House of Representatives called for Purcell to resign.

As a result of the election, and after a request by Phoenix Mayor Greg Stanton, the Department of Justice launched a federal investigation into the primary.

== Elections ==
- 2016 Purcell faced primary challenger Aaron Flannery, the results were too close to call on election night. Purcell won with 154,682 votes or 50.03% to Flannery's 154,497 votes or 49.97%, a margin of 185 votes. She lost the general election to Democrat Adrian Fontes.
- 2012 Purcell was unchallenged in the primary and general election.
- 2008 Purcell defeated Libertarian Ernest Hancock in the general election with 78.7% of the votes
- 2004 Purcell was unchallenged in the primary and general election.
- 2000 Purcell was unchallenged in the primary and general election.

== "Purcell principle" ==
Professor of electoral law Richard L. Hasen created the "Purcell principle" after the 2006 Supreme Court case Purcell v. Gonzalez in which Purcell was sued in her official capacity. The principle states that lower courts should be very reluctant to change the rules just before an election, because of the risk of voter confusion and chaos for election officials.
