= 2014 Arizona House of Representatives election =

- November 4, 2014

All 60 seats in the Arizona House 31 seats needed for a majority
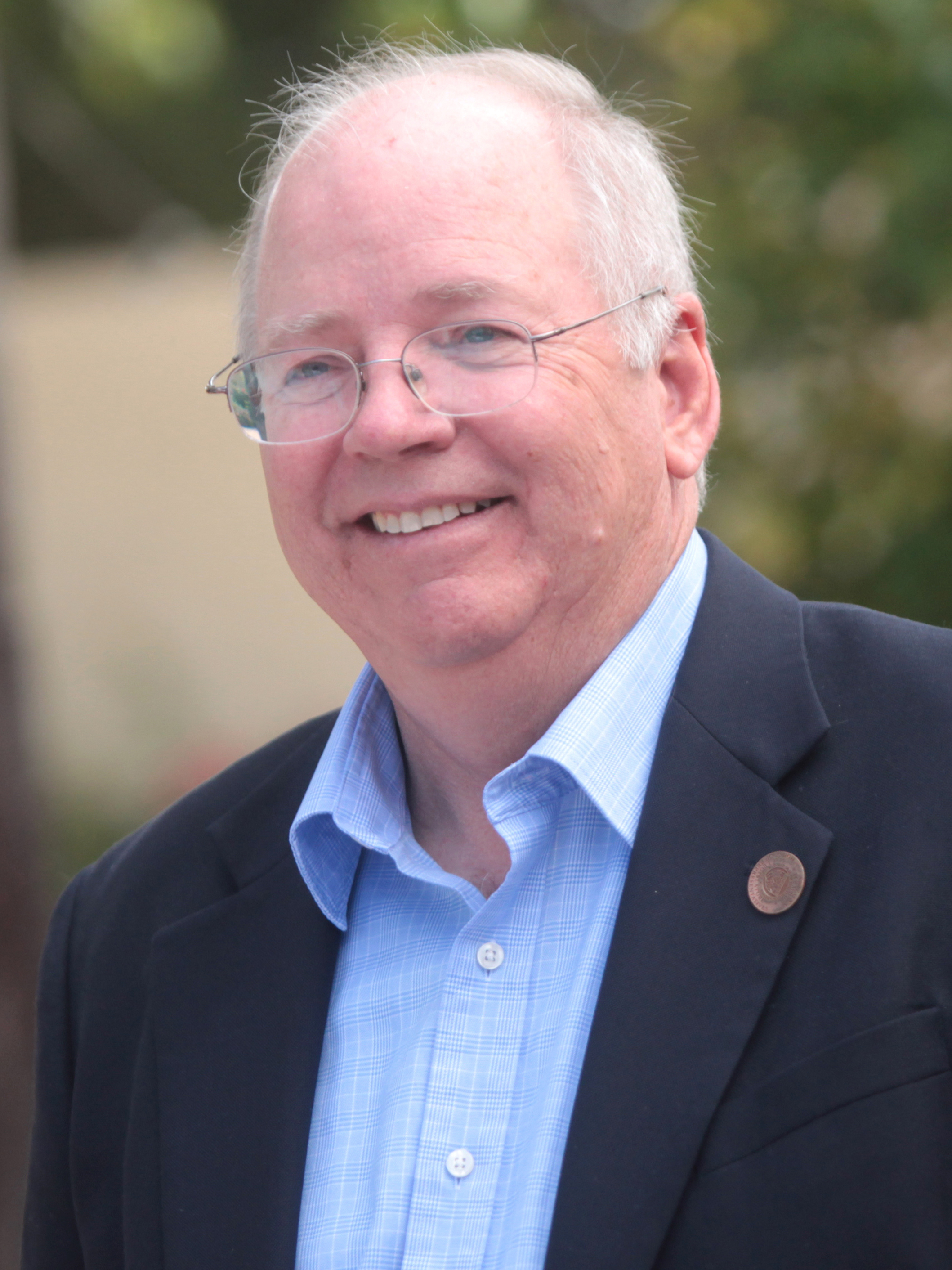

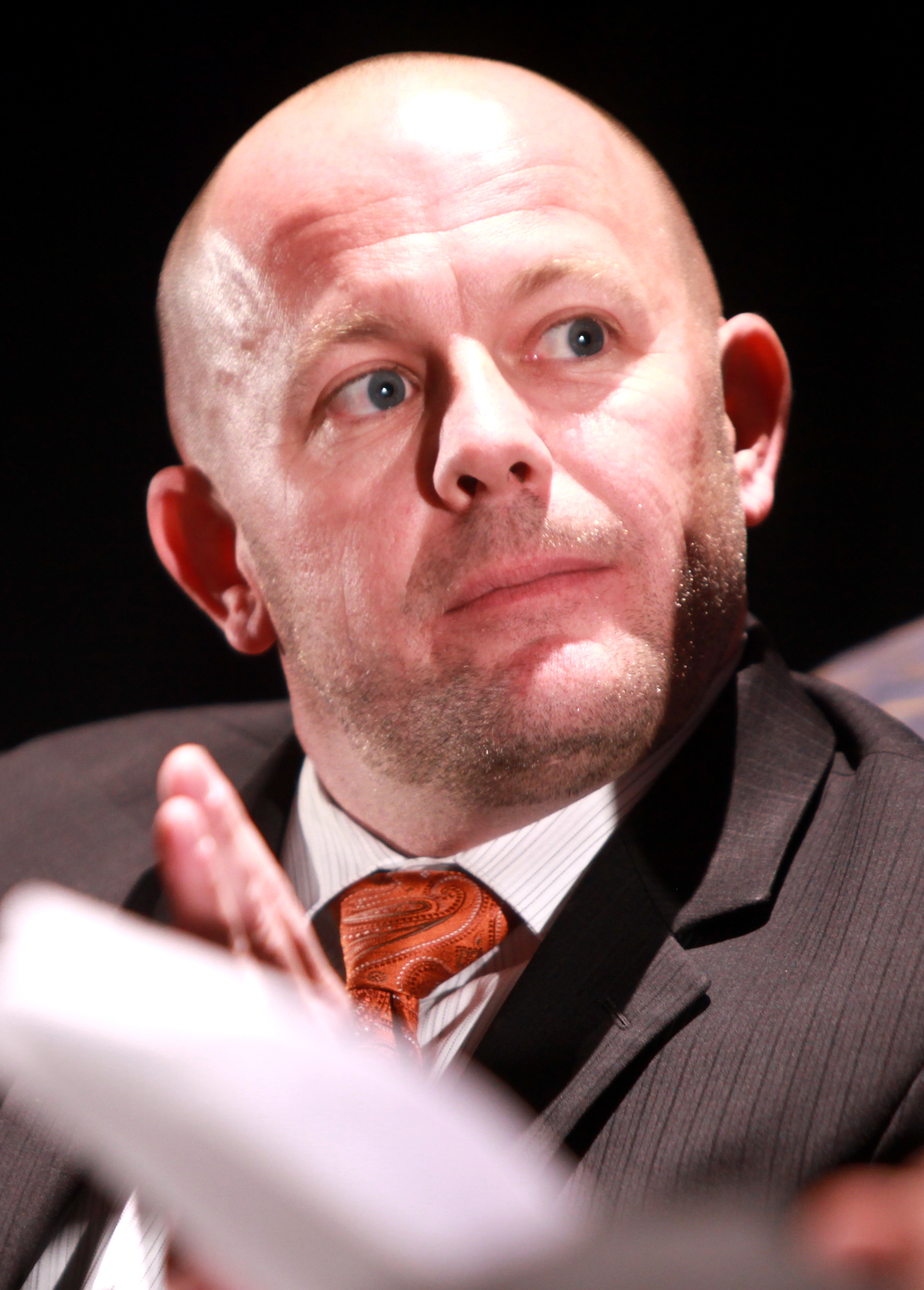
	Majority party	Minority party
Leader	Andy Tobin (retired)	Chad Campbell (retired)
Party	Republican	Democratic
Leader's seat	1st - Paulden	24th - Phoenix
Last election	36	24
Seats after	36	24
Seat change	Steady	Steady
- Results: Democratic hold Democratic gain Republican hold Republican gain
Speaker before election
Andy Tobin
Republican
Elected Speaker
David Gowan
Republican

The 2014 Arizona House of Representatives election took place on Tuesday, November 4, 2014, with the primary election held on Tuesday, August 26, 2014. Arizona voters elected all 60 members of the Arizona House of Representatives in multi-member districts to serve two-year terms.

The election coincided with United States national elections and Arizona state elections, including U.S. House, Arizona governor, and Arizona Senate.

Following the previous election in 2012, Republicans held a 36-to-24-seat majority over Democrats. Republicans maintained their majority in 2014, preserving a 36-to-24-seat advantage over Democrats. The newly elected members served in the 52nd Arizona State Legislature, during which Republican David Gowan was elected as Speaker of the Arizona House. (Note: David Gowan was elected by acclamation as Speaker for the 52nd legislature.)

== Retiring incumbents ==
=== Democrats ===
1. District 4: Juan Carlos "J.C." Escamilla
2. District 7: Jamescita Peshlakai (Note: Representative Jamescita Peshlakai ran for Arizona Senate, but was defeated in the Democratic primary election by incumbent Carlyle Begay.)
3. District 19: Lupe Chavira Contreras (Note: Elected to the Arizona Senate.)
4. District 24: Chad Campbell
5. District 27: Catherine Miranda (Note: Elected to the Arizona Senate.)
6. District 29: Martín J. Quezada (Note: Elected to the Arizona Senate.)
7. District 29: Lydia Hernández (Note: Representative Lydia Hernández ran for Arizona Senate, but was defeated in the Democratic primary election by Martín J. Quezada.)

=== Republicans ===
1. District 1: Andy Tobin (Note: Representative Andy Tobin ran for U.S. House, but was defeated in the general election by incumbent Democrat Ann Kirkpatrick.)
2. District 5: Doris Goodale
3. District 11: Steve Smith (Note: Elected to the Arizona Senate.)
4. District 11: Adam Kwasman (Note: Representative Adam Kwasman ran for U.S. House, but was defeated in the Republican primary election by Andy Tobin.)
5. District 17: Thomas "Tom" Forese (Note: Elected to the Arizona Corporation Commission.)
6. District 18: Jeff Dial (Note: Elected to the Arizona Senate.)
7. District 21: Debbie Lesko (Note: Elected to the Arizona Senate.)
8. District 23: John Kavanagh (Note: Elected to the Arizona Senate.)
9. District 25: Justin Pierce (Note: Representative Justin Pierce ran for Arizona Secretary of State, but was defeated in the Republican primary election by Michele Reagan.)

== Incumbents defeated in primary election ==
=== Democrat ===
1. District 27: Norma Muñoz (Note: Democratic representative Ruben Gallego resigned on March 14, 2014. Norma Muñoz (D) was appointed on March 24, 2014 by the Maricopa County Board of Supervisors to fill the House vacancy in Legislative District 27.)

=== Republican ===
1. District 20: Carl Seel

== Incumbents defeated in general election ==
=== Democrat ===
1. District 2: Demion Clinco (Note: Democratic representative Andrea Dalessandro resigned on January 21, 2014 and was appointed by the Pima County Board of Supervisors to fill the Senate vacancy in Legislative District 2. Demion Clinco (D) was appointed on February 6, 2014 by the Pima County Board of Supervisors to fill the House vacancy in Legislative District 2.)

=== Republican ===
1. District 9: Ethan Orr

== Predictions ==
Source	Ranking	As of
Governing	Likely R	October 20, 2014

== Summary of results ==
Italics denote an open seat held by the incumbent party; bold text denotes a gain for a party.

District	Incumbent	Party	Elected representative	Outcome
1st	Karen Fann	Rep	Karen Fann	Rep hold
1st	Andy Tobin	Rep	Noel Campbell	Rep hold
2nd	Rosanna Gabaldón	Dem	Rosanna Gabaldón	Dem hold
2nd	Demion Clinco	Dem	**John Christopher Ackerley**	**Rep gain**
3rd	Sally Ann Gonzales	Dem	Sally Ann Gonzales	Dem hold
3rd	Macario Saldate	Dem	Macario Saldate	Dem hold
4th	Lisa Otondo	Dem	Lisa Otondo	Dem hold
4th	Juan Carlos "J.C." Escamilla	Dem	Charlene Fernandez	Dem hold
5th	Sonny Borrelli	Rep	Sonny Borrelli	Rep hold
5th	Doris Goodale	Rep	Regina Cobb	Rep hold
6th	Brenda Barton	Rep	Brenda Barton	Rep hold
6th	Bob Thorpe	Rep	Bob Thorpe	Rep hold
7th	Albert Hale	Dem	Albert Hale	Dem hold
7th	Jamescita Peshlakai	Dem	Jennifer D. Benally	Dem hold
8th	Frank Pratt	Rep	Frank Pratt	Rep hold
8th	Thomas "T.J." Shope	Rep	Thomas "T.J." Shope	Rep hold
9th	Victoria Steele	Dem	Victoria Steele (Note: Democratic representative Victoria Steele resigned effective January 11, 2016. Matthew A. "Matt" Kopec (D) was appointed on January 19, 2016 by the Pima County Board of Supervisors to fill the House vacancy in Legislative District 9 and sworn into office on January 20, 2016.)	Dem hold
9th	Ethan Orr	Rep	**Randall "Randy" Friese**	**Dem gain**
10th	Bruce Wheeler	Dem	Bruce Wheeler	Dem hold
10th	Stefanie Mach	Dem	Stefanie Mach	Dem hold
11th	Steve Smith	Rep	Mark Finchem	Rep hold
11th	Adam Kwasman	Rep	Vince Leach	Rep hold
12th	Eddie Farnsworth	Rep	Eddie Farnsworth	Rep hold
12th	Warren Petersen	Rep	Warren Petersen	Rep hold
13th	Steve Montenegro	Rep	Steve Montenegro	Rep hold
13th	Darin Mitchell	Rep	Darin Mitchell	Rep hold
14th	David Gowan	Rep	David Gowan	Rep hold
14th	David Stevens	Rep	David Stevens	Rep hold
15th	Heather Carter	Rep	Heather Carter	Rep hold
15th	John Allen	Rep	John Allen	Rep hold
16th	Kelly Townsend	Rep	Kelly Townsend	Rep hold
16th	Doug Coleman	Rep	Doug Coleman	Rep hold
17th	J.D. Mesnard	Rep	J.D. Mesnard	Rep hold
17th	Thomas "Tom" Forese	Rep	Jeff Weninger	Rep hold
18th	Bob Robson	Rep	Bob Robson	Rep hold
18th	Jeff Dial	Rep	Jill Norgaard	Rep hold
19th	Mark Cardenas	Dem	Mark Cardenas	Dem hold
19th	Lupe Chavira Contreras	Dem	Diego Espinoza	Dem hold
20th	Paul Boyer	Rep	Paul Boyer	Rep hold
20th	Carl Seel	Rep	Anthony Kern	Rep hold
21st	Rick Gray	Rep	Rick Gray	Rep hold
21st	Debbie Lesko	Rep	Tony Rivero	Rep hold
22nd	Phil Lovas	Rep	Phil Lovas	Rep hold
22nd	David Livingston	Rep	David Livingston	Rep hold
23rd	Michelle Ugenti	Rep	Michelle Ugenti	Rep hold
23rd	John Kavanagh	Rep	Jay Lawrence	Rep hold
24th	Lela Alston	Dem	Lela Alston	Dem hold
24th	Chad Campbell	Dem	Ken Clark	Dem hold
25th	Justin Olson	Rep	Justin Olson	Rep hold
25th	Justin Pierce	Rep	Russell "Rusty" Bowers	Rep hold
26th	Juan Jose Mendez	Dem	Juan Jose Mendez	Dem hold
26th	Andrew Sherwood	Dem	Andrew Sherwood (Note: Democratic representative Andrew C. Sherwood was appointed on November 5, 2015, by the Maricopa County Board of Supervisors to fill the Senate vacancy in Legislative District 26. Celeste Plumlee (D) was appointed on December 9, 2015, by the Maricopa County Board of Supervisors to fill the House vacancy in Legislative District 26 and sworn into office on December 15, 2015.)	Dem hold
27th	Catherine Miranda	Dem	Reginald Bolding	Dem hold
27th	Norma Muñoz	Dem	Rebecca Rios	Dem hold
28th	Eric Meyer	Dem	Eric Meyer	Dem hold
28th	Kate Brophy McGee	Rep	Kate Brophy McGee	Rep hold
29th	Martín J. Quezada	Dem	Richard C. Andrade	Dem hold
29th	Lydia Hernández	Dem	Ceci Velásquez	Dem hold
30th	Debbie McCune-Davis	Dem	Debbie McCune-Davis	Dem hold
30th	Jonathan Larkin	Dem	Jonathan Larkin	Dem hold

== Detailed results ==
Sources for election results:

=== District 1 ===
Primary election results
Party	Candidate	Votes	%
Republican Party primary results
Republican	Karen Fann (incumbent)	19,350	35.87%
Republican	Noel Campbell	16,288	30.20%
Republican	Linda Gray	13,490	25.01%
Republican	Sean Englund	4,812	8.92%
Total votes		53,940	100.00%
Democratic Party primary results
Democratic	Frank Cuccia	7,262	100.00%
Total votes		7,262	100.00%

General election results
Party	Candidate	Votes	%
Republican	Karen Fann (incumbent)	46,597	41.35%
Republican	Noel Campbell	43,864	38.93%
Democratic	Frank Cuccia	22,223	19.72%
Total votes		112,684	100.00%
Republican hold			
Republican hold			

=== District 2 ===
Primary election results
Party	Candidate	Votes	%
Democratic Party primary results
Democratic	Rosanna Gabaldón (incumbent)	9,922	60.08%
Democratic	Demion Clinco (incumbent)	6,593	39.92%
Total votes		16,515	100.00%
Republican Party primary results
Republican	John Christopher Ackerley	9,429	100.00%
Total votes		9,429	100.00%

General election results
Party	Candidate	Votes	%
Democratic	Rosanna Gabaldón (incumbent)	21,200	36.59%
Republican	John Christopher Ackerley	19,656	33.93%
Democratic	Demion Clinco (incumbent)	17,080	29.48%
Total votes		57,936	100.00%
Democratic hold			
Republican gain from Democratic			

=== District 3 ===
Primary election results
Party	Candidate	Votes	%
Democratic Party primary results
Democratic	Sally Ann Gonzales (incumbent)	9,597	53.76%
Democratic	Macario Saldate (incumbent)	8,253	46.24%
Total votes		17,850	100.00%

General election results
Party	Candidate	Votes	%
Democratic	Sally Ann Gonzales (incumbent)	22,883	53.18%
Democratic	Macario Saldate (incumbent)	20,148	46.82%
Total votes		43,031	100.00%
Democratic hold			
Democratic hold			

=== District 4 ===
Primary election results
Party	Candidate	Votes	%
Democratic Party primary results
Democratic	Lisa Otondo (incumbent)	4,556	38.24%
Democratic	Charlene Fernandez	4,497	37.75%
Democratic	Jose Suarez	2,861	24.01%
Total votes		11,914	100.00%
Republican Party primary results
Republican	Richard Hopkins	5,635	100.00%
Total votes		5,635	100.00%

General election results
Party	Candidate	Votes	%
Democratic	Lisa Otondo (incumbent)	13,324	35.40%
Democratic	Charlene Fernandez	12,251	32.55%
Republican	Richard Hopkins	12,063	32.05%
Total votes		37,638	100.00%
Democratic hold			
Democratic hold			

=== District 5 ===
Primary election results
Party	Candidate	Votes	%
Republican Party primary results
Republican	Sonny Borrelli (incumbent)	12,286	35.18%
Republican	Regina Cobb	7,559	21.65%
Republican	Sam Medrano	5,904	16.91%
Republican	Jennifer Jones	5,236	14.99%
Republican	George Schnittgrund	3,936	11.27%
Total votes		34,921	100.00%
Democratic Party primary results
Democratic	Beth Weisser	4,180	52.67%
Democratic	Joseph "Joe" Longoria	3,756	47.33%
Total votes		7,936	100.00%

General election results
Party	Candidate	Votes	%
Republican	Sonny Borrelli (incumbent)	31,277	37.91%
Republican	Regina Cobb	30,160	36.55%
Democratic	Joseph "Joe" Longoria	10,613	12.86%
Democratic	Beth Weisser	10,461	12.68%
Total votes		82,511	100.00%
Republican hold			
Republican hold			

=== District 6 ===
Primary election results
Party	Candidate	Votes	%
Republican Party primary results
Republican	Bob Thorpe (incumbent)	16,774	54.05%
Republican	Brenda Barton (incumbent)	14,262	45.95%
Total votes		31,036	100.00%
Democratic Party primary results
Democratic	Lanny Morrison	10,959	100.00%
Total votes		10,959	100.00%

General election results
Party	Candidate	Votes	%
Republican	Brenda Barton (incumbent)	32,948	35.29%
Republican	Bob Thorpe (incumbent)	32,886	35.23%
Democratic	Lanny Morrison	27,520	29.48%
Total votes		93,354	100.00%
Republican hold			
Republican hold			

=== District 7 ===
Primary election results
Party	Candidate	Votes	%
Democratic Party primary results
Democratic	Albert Hale (incumbent)	12,897	42.78%
Democratic	Jennifer D. Benally	9,953	33.02%
Democratic	Joshua Lavar Butler	6,955	23.07%
Democratic	Arlando S. Teller (Note: The candidate ran a write-in campaign in this election.)	339	1.12%
Total votes		30,144	100.00%

General election results
Party	Candidate	Votes	%
Democratic	Jennifer D. Benally	27,625	51.45%
Democratic	Albert Hale (incumbent)	26,071	48.55%
Total votes		53,696	100.00%
Democratic hold			
Democratic hold			

=== District 8 ===
Primary election results
Party	Candidate	Votes	%
Republican Party primary results
Republican	Frank Pratt (incumbent)	5,992	32.21%
Republican	Thomas "T.J." Shope (incumbent)	5,556	29.87%
Republican	Darla Dawald	4,081	21.94%
Republican	Wayne Bachmann	2,974	15.99%
Total votes		18,603	100.00%
Democratic Party primary results
Democratic	Carmen Casillas	8,481	100.00%
Total votes		8,481	100.00%

General election results
Party	Candidate	Votes	%
Republican	Frank Pratt (incumbent)	19,458	36.37%
Republican	Thomas "T.J." Shope (incumbent)	19,198	35.88%
Democratic	Carmen Casillas	14,847	27.75%
Total votes		53,503	100.00%
Republican hold			
Republican hold			

=== District 9 ===
Primary election results
Party	Candidate	Votes	%
Democratic Party primary results
Democratic	Victoria Steele (incumbent)	13,939	52.60%
Democratic	Randall "Randy" Friese	12,561	47.40%
Total votes		26,500	100.00%
Republican Party primary results
Republican	Ethan Orr (incumbent)	15,141	100.00%
Total votes		15,141	100.00%

General election results
Party	Candidate	Votes	%
Democratic	Victoria Steele (incumbent)	33,425	33.62%
Democratic	Randall "Randy" Friese	33,059	33.25%
Republican	Ethan Orr (incumbent)	32,928	33.12%
Total votes		99,412	100.00%
Democratic hold			
Democratic gain from Republican			

=== District 10 ===
Primary election results
Party	Candidate	Votes	%
Democratic Party primary results
Democratic	Stefanie Mach (incumbent)	13,090	50.21%
Democratic	Bruce Wheeler (incumbent)	12,982	49.79%
Total votes		26,072	100.00%
Republican Party primary results
Republican	Todd Clodfelter	14,104	57.41%
Republican	William Wildish	10,463	42.59%
Total votes		24,567	100.00%

General election results
Party	Candidate	Votes	%
Democratic	Bruce Wheeler (incumbent)	32,731	27.49%
Democratic	Stefanie Mach (incumbent)	31,163	26.17%
Republican	Todd Clodfelter	29,940	25.14%
Republican	William Wildish	25,240	21.20%
Total votes		119,074	100.00%
Democratic hold			
Democratic hold			

=== District 11 ===
Primary election results
Party	Candidate	Votes	%
Republican Party primary results
Republican	Vince Leach	15,596	41.85%
Republican	Mark Finchem	13,584	36.45%
Republican	Jo Grant	8,087	21.70%
Total votes		37,267	100.00%
Democratic Party primary results
Democratic	Holly Lyon	11,196	100.00%
Total votes		11,196	100.00%

General election results
Party	Candidate	Votes	%
Republican	Mark Finchem	36,732	37.31%
Republican	Vince Leach	34,274	34.81%
Democratic	Holly Lyon	27,392	27.82%
Democratic	Barry McCain	49	0.05%
Total votes		98,447	100.00%
Republican hold			
Republican hold			

=== District 12 ===
Primary election results
Party	Candidate	Votes	%
Republican Party primary results
Republican	Warren Petersen (incumbent)	16,442	51.72%
Republican	Eddie Farnsworth (incumbent)	15,351	48.28%
Total votes		31,793	100.00%
Democratic Party primary results
Democratic	DJ Rothans	4,856	100.00%
Total votes		4,856	100.00%

General election results
Party	Candidate	Votes	%
Republican	Warren Petersen (incumbent)	34,784	40.41%
Republican	Eddie Farnsworth (incumbent)	32,843	38.16%
Democratic	DJ Rothans	18,446	21.43%
Total votes		86,073	100.00%
Republican hold			
Republican hold			

=== District 13 ===
Primary election results
Party	Candidate	Votes	%
Republican Party primary results
Republican	Steve Montenegro (incumbent)	11,548	37.73%
Republican	Darin Mitchell (incumbent)	11,372	37.16%
Republican	Diane Landis	7,684	25.11%
Total votes		30,604	100.00%
Democratic Party primary results
Democratic	Steve Hansen	5,728	100.00%
Total votes		5,728	100.00%

General election results
Party	Candidate	Votes	%
Republican	Steve Montenegro (incumbent)	28,028	39.99%
Republican	Darin Mitchell (incumbent)	27,550	39.31%
Democratic	Steve Hansen	14,509	20.70%
Total votes		70,087	100.00%
Republican hold			
Republican hold			

=== District 14 ===
Primary election results
Party	Candidate	Votes	%
Republican Party primary results
Republican	David Gowan (incumbent)	15,475	41.45%
Republican	David Stevens (incumbent)	14,909	39.93%
Republican	Susan Syfert	6,953	18.62%
Total votes		37,337	100.00%
Democratic Party primary results
Democratic	James C. Burton	10,124	100.00%
Total votes		10,124	100.00%

General election results
Party	Candidate	Votes	%
Republican	David Gowan (incumbent)	34,946	37.78%
Republican	David Stevens (incumbent)	34,850	37.67%
Democratic	James C. Burton	22,713	24.55%
Total votes		92,509	100.000%
Republican hold			
Republican hold			

=== District 15 ===
Primary election results
Party	Candidate	Votes	%
Republican Party primary results
Republican	Heather Carter (incumbent)	12,175	37.60%
Republican	John Allen (incumbent)	10,119	31.25%
Republican	David Burnell Smith	10,087	31.15%
Total votes		32,381	100.00%

General election results
Party	Candidate	Votes	%
Republican	Heather Carter (incumbent)	38,664	53.37%
Republican	John Allen (incumbent)	33,785	46.63%
Total votes		72,449	100.00%
Republican hold			
Republican hold			

=== District 16 ===
Primary election results
Party	Candidate	Votes	%
Republican Party primary results
Republican	Kelly Townsend (incumbent)	12,035	38.28%
Republican	Doug Coleman (incumbent)	8,826	28.07%
Republican	John Fillmore	6,856	21.81%
Republican	Adam Stevens	3,724	11.84%
Total votes		31,441	100.00%
Democratic Party primary results
Democratic	Cara Prior	6,276	100.00%
Total votes		6,276	100.00%

General election results
Party	Candidate	Votes	%
Republican	Doug Coleman (incumbent)	28,908	39.60%
Republican	Kelly Townsend (incumbent)	28,300	38.77%
Democratic	Cara Prior	15,792	21.63%
Total votes		73,000	100.00%
Republican hold			
Republican hold			

=== District 17 ===
Primary election results
Party	Candidate	Votes	%
Republican Party primary results
Republican	Jeff Weninger	15,282	52.46%
Republican	J.D. Mesnard (incumbent)	13,849	47.54%
Total votes		29,131	100.00%
Democratic Party primary results
Democratic	Danielle Lee	7,319	100.00%
Total votes		7,319	100.00%

General election results
Party	Candidate	Votes	%
Republican	Jeff Weninger	32,297	38.62%
Republican	J.D. Mesnard (incumbent)	30,018	35.90%
Democratic	Danielle Lee	21,304	25.48%
Total votes		83,619	100.00%
Republican hold			
Republican hold			

=== District 18 ===
Primary election results
Party	Candidate	Votes	%
Republican Party primary results
Republican	Jill Norgaard	11,324	32.27%
Republican	Bob Robson (incumbent)	10,594	30.19%
Republican	John King	7,210	20.55%
Republican	David Pheanis	5,963	16.99%
Total votes		35,091	100.00%
Democratic Party primary results
Democratic	Denise "Mitzi" Epstein	10,761	100.00%
Total votes		10,761	100.00%

General election results
Party	Candidate	Votes	%
Republican	Jill Norgaard	32,863	34.62%
Republican	Bob Robson (incumbent)	31,587	33.27%
Democratic	Denise "Mitzi" Epstein	30,480	32.11%
Total votes		94,930	100.00%
Republican hold			
Republican hold			

=== District 19 ===
Primary election results
Party	Candidate	Votes	%
Democratic Party primary results
Democratic	Mark Cardenas (incumbent)	4,181	52.88%
Democratic	Diego Espinoza	3,726	47.12%
Total votes		7,907	100.00%
Republican Party primary results
Republican	Sophia E. Johnson	3,382	100.00%
Total votes		3,382	100.00%

General election results
Party	Candidate	Votes	%
Democratic	Mark Cardenas (incumbent)	10,999	37.79%
Democratic	Diego Espinoza	10,076	34.62%
Republican	Sophia E. Johnson	8,029	27.59%
Total votes		29,104	100.00%
Democratic hold			
Democratic hold			

=== District 20 ===
Primary election results
Party	Candidate	Votes	%
Republican Party primary results
Republican	Paul Boyer (incumbent)	9,436	32.68%
Republican	Anthony Kern	6,674	23.11%
Republican	Carl Seel (incumbent)	4,817	16.68%
Republican	Bill Adams	4,480	15.51%
Republican	Thurane Aung Khin	3,469	12.01%
Total votes		28,876	100.00%
Democratic Party primary results
Democratic	Amy Schwabenlender	7,612	100.00%
Total votes		7,612	100.00%

General election results
Party	Candidate	Votes	%
Republican	Paul Boyer (incumbent)	25,610	37.02%
Republican	Anthony Kern	23,799	34.40%
Democratic	Amy Schwabenlender	19,779	28.59%
Total votes		69,188	100.00%
Republican hold			
Republican hold			

=== District 21 ===
Primary election results
Party	Candidate	Votes	%
Republican Party primary results
Republican	Rick Gray (incumbent)	16,739	61.95%
Republican	Tony Rivero	10,281	38.05%
Total votes		27,020	100.00%
Democratic Party primary results
Democratic	Esther Duran Lumm	8,294	100.00%
Total votes		8,294	100.00%

General election results
Party	Candidate	Votes	%
Republican	Rick Gray (incumbent)	29,589	38.41%
Republican	Tony Rivero	27,826	36.12%
Democratic	Esther Duran Lumm	19,629	25.48%
Total votes		77,044	100.00%
Republican hold			
Republican hold			

=== District 22 ===
Primary election results
Party	Candidate	Votes	%
Republican Party primary results
Republican	David Livingston (incumbent)	20,885	52.02%
Republican	Phil Lovas (incumbent)	19,265	47.98%
Total votes		40,150	100.00%
Democratic Party primary results
Democratic	Bonnie Boyce-Wilson	7,636	53.30%
Democratic	Larry Woods	6,691	46.70%
Total votes		14,327	100.00%
Americans Elect Party Primary Results
Americans Elect	Suzie Easter	4	100.00%
Total votes		4	100.00%

General election results
Party	Candidate	Votes	%
Republican	Phil Lovas (incumbent)	42,409	32.74%
Republican	David Livingston (incumbent)	41,832	32.29%
Democratic	Bonnie Boyce-Wilson	20,173	15.57%
Democratic	Larry Woods	18,547	14.32%
Independent	Fred Botha (Note: Fred Botha's political affiliation is listed as "Independent New Dude" in the official listing of general election candidates.)	4,093	3.16%
Americans Elect	Suzie Easter	2,487	1.92%
Total votes		129,541	100.00%
Republican hold			
Republican hold			

=== District 23 ===
Primary election results
Party	Candidate	Votes	%
Republican Party primary results
Republican	Michelle Ugenti (incumbent)	19,331	35.08%
Republican	Jay Lawrence	13,573	24.63%
Republican	Bob Littlefield	12,451	22.60%
Republican	Effie Carlson	9,750	17.69%
Total votes		55,105	100.00%

General election results
Party	Candidate	Votes	%
Republican	Michelle Ugenti (incumbent)	51,124	53.49%
Republican	Jay Lawrence	44,453	46.51%
Total votes		95,577	100.00%
Republican hold			
Republican hold			

=== District 24 ===
Primary election results
Party	Candidate	Votes	%
Democratic Party primary results
Democratic	Lela Alston (incumbent)	8,006	42.91%
Democratic	Ken Clark	6,663	35.71%
Democratic	Richard Bauer	3,990	21.38%
Total votes		18,659	100.00%
Republican Party primary results
Republican	Lei Lani Cortez	6,987	100.00%
Total votes		6,987	100.00%

General election results
Party	Candidate	Votes	%
Democratic	Lela Alston (incumbent)	21,740	38.75%
Democratic	Ken Clark	21,186	37.76%
Republican	Lei Lani Cortez	13,183	23.50%
Total votes		56,109	100.00%
Democratic hold			
Democratic hold			

=== District 25 ===
Primary election results
Party	Candidate	Votes	%
Republican Party primary results
Republican	Justin Olson (incumbent)	15,907	33.71%
Republican	Russell "Rusty" Bowers	13,158	27.88%
Republican	Michelle Udall	12,332	26.13%
Republican	Haydee Dawson	2,978	6.31%
Republican	Jerry D. Walker	2,812	5.96%
Total votes		47,187	100.00%
Democratic Party primary results
Democratic	Sheila Ogea	5,429	50.80%
Democratic	David Butler	5,257	49.20%
Total votes		10,686	100.00%
Libertarian Party Primary Results
Libertarian	Michael Kielsky	163	100.00%
Total votes		163	100.00%

General election results
Party	Candidate	Votes	%
Republican	Justin Olson (incumbent)	34,451	33.99%
Republican	Russell "Rusty" Bowers	33,220	32.78%
Democratic	David Butler	15,145	14.94%
Democratic	Sheila Ogea	14,866	14.67%
Libertarian	Michael Kielsky	3,661	3.61%
Total votes		101,343	100.00%
Republican hold			
Republican hold			

=== District 26 ===
Primary election results
Party	Candidate	Votes	%
Democratic Party primary results
Democratic	Juan Jose Mendez (incumbent)	5,387	51.61%
Democratic	Andrew Sherwood (incumbent)	5,051	48.39%
Total votes		10,438	100.00%
Republican Party primary results
Republican	James Roy	5,886	100.00%
Total votes		5,886	100.00%
Libertarian Party Primary Results
Libertarian	Chris Will	164	100.00%
Total votes		164	100.00%

General election results
Party	Candidate	Votes	%
Democratic	Andrew Sherwood (incumbent)	13,584	31.23%
Democratic	Juan Jose Mendez (incumbent)	13,413	30.84%
Republican	James Roy	11,098	25.52%
Libertarian	Chris Will	5,395	12.41%
Total votes		43,490	100.00%
Democratic hold			
Democratic hold			

=== District 27 ===
Primary election results
Party	Candidate	Votes	%
Democratic Party primary results
Democratic	Rebecca Rios	4,797	29.65%
Democratic	Reginald Bolding	4,307	26.62%
Democratic	Norma Muñoz (incumbent)	4,067	25.14%
Democratic	Marcelino Quiñonez	2,977	18.40%
Democratic	Edward Blackwell	31	0.19%
Total votes		16,179	100.00%
Republican Party primary results
Republican	Jose Tello	133	52.16%
Republican	Myron L. Jackson, Sr.	122	47.84%
Total votes		255	100.00%

General election results
Party	Candidate	Votes	%
Democratic	Rebecca Rios	16,576	40.38%
Democratic	Reginald Bolding	13,950	33.98%
Republican	Myron L. Jackson, Sr.	5,261	12.82%
Republican	Jose Tello	5,261	12.82%
Total votes		41,048	100.00%
Democratic hold			
Democratic hold			

=== District 28 ===
Primary election results
Party	Candidate	Votes	%
Democratic Party primary results
Democratic	Eric Meyer (incumbent)	11,416	100.00%
Total votes		11,416	100.00%
Republican Party primary results
Republican	Kate Brophy McGee (incumbent)	16,900	46.41%
Republican	Shawnna Bolick	9,952	27.33%
Republican	Mary Hamway	9,562	26.26%
Total votes		36,414	100.00%
Libertarian Party Primary Results
Libertarian	Zhani Doko	196	100.00%
Total votes		196	100.00%

General election results
Party	Candidate	Votes	%
Republican	Kate Brophy McGee (incumbent)	37,054	35.95%
Democratic	Eric Meyer (incumbent)	31,646	30.70%
Republican	Shawnna Bolick	29,061	28.20%
Libertarian	Zhani Doko	5,306	5.15%
Total votes		103,067	100.00%
Republican hold			
Democratic hold			

=== District 29 ===
Primary election results
Party	Candidate	Votes	%
Democratic Party primary results
Democratic	Richard C. Andrade	2,933	28.73%
Democratic	Ceci Velásquez	2,843	27.85%
Democratic	Denice Martha Garcia	2,455	24.05%
Democratic	Steve Chapman	1,978	19.38%
Total votes		10,209	100.00%
Republican Party primary results
Republican	Aaron Borders	3,770	100.00%
Total votes		3,770	100.00%

General election results
Party	Candidate	Votes	%
Democratic	Richard C. Andrade	10,127	36.16%
Democratic	Ceci Velásquez	9,556	34.12%
Republican	Aaron Borders	8,320	29.71%
Total votes		28,003	100.00%
Democratic hold			
Democratic hold			

=== District 30 ===
Primary election results
Party	Candidate	Votes	%
Democratic Party primary results
Democratic	Debbie McCune-Davis (incumbent)	5,224	54.55%
Democratic	Jonathan Larkin (incumbent)	4,352	45.45%
Total votes		9,576	100.00%
Republican Party primary results
Republican	John Lyon	4,202	55.14%
Republican	Michael Aaron Gidwani	3,418	44.86%
Total votes		7,620	100.00%

General election results
Party	Candidate	Votes	%
Democratic	Debbie McCune-Davis (incumbent)	11,980	30.84%
Democratic	Jonathan Larkin (incumbent)	11,252	28.97%
Republican	John Lyon	8,158	21.00%
Republican	Michael Aaron Gidwani	7,445	19.17%
Independent	Angel Garcia	11	0.03%
Total votes		38,846	100.00%
Democratic hold			
Democratic hold			

== See also ==
- 2014 United States elections
- 2014 United States House of Representatives elections in Arizona
- 2014 Arizona elections
- 2014 Arizona gubernatorial election
- 2014 Arizona Secretary of State election
- 2014 Arizona Attorney General election
- 2014 Arizona Senate election
- 52nd Arizona State Legislature
- Arizona House of Representatives
