= 52nd Arizona State Legislature =

Session of the Arizona Legislature

←	51st	53rd	→
- Arizona State Capitol (2014)

Overview
- Legislative body: Arizona State Legislature
- Jurisdiction: Arizona, United States
- Term: January 1, 2015 – December 31, 2016

Senate
- Members: 30
- President: Andy Biggs
- Temporary President: Sylvia Allen
- Party control: Republican (17-13)

House of Representatives
- Members: 60
- Speaker: David Gowan
- Party control: Republican (36–24)

Sessions
- 1st: January 12 – April 3, 2015
- 2nd: January 11 – May 7, 2016

Special sessions
- 1st: October 28 – October 30, 2015

The 52nd Arizona State Legislature, consisting of the Arizona State Senate and the Arizona House of Representatives, was constituted in Phoenix from January 1, 2015 to December 31, 2016, during the first two years of Doug Ducey's first full term in office. Both the Senate and the House membership remained constant at 30 and 60, respectively. Senate balance was unchanged, leaving the Republicans with a 17-13 majority. Republicans also maintained an unchanged 36–24 majority in the House. One senator switched party affiliation from Democrat to Republican in November 2015, boosting the Senate Republican majority to 18-12 for the second legislative session.

== Sessions ==
The Legislature met for two regular sessions at the State Capitol in Phoenix. The first opened on January 12, 2015, and adjourned on April 3, while the Second Regular Session convened on January 11, 2016 and adjourned sine die on May 7.

There was one Special Session, which was convened on October 28, 2015 and adjourned on October 30.

== State Senate ==
=== Members ===
The asterisk (*) denotes members of the previous Legislature who continued in office as members of this Legislature.

District	Senator	Party	Notes
1	Steve Pierce*	Republican	
2	Andrea Dalessandro*	Democrat	
3	Olivia Cajero Bedford*	Democrat	
4	Lynne Pancrazi*	Democrat	
5	Kelli Ward*	Republican	Resigned December 15, 2015
5	Sue Donahue	Republican	Appointed December 22, 2015
6	Sylvia Allen	Republican	
7	Carlyle Begay*	Democrat	Switched to Republican Party on November 23, 2015
8	Barbara McGuire*	Democrat	
9	Steve Farley*	Democrat	
10	David Bradley*	Democrat	
11	Steve Smith	Republican	
12	Andy Biggs*	Republican	
13	Don Shooter*	Republican	
14	Gail Griffin*	Republican	
15	Nancy Barto*	Republican	
16	David C. Farnsworth*	Republican	
17	Steve Yarbrough*	Republican	
18	Jeff Dial	Republican	
19	Lupe Contreras	Democrat	
20	Kimberly Yee*	Republican	
21	Debbie Lesko	Republican	
22	Judy M. Burges*	Republican	
23	John Kavanagh	Republican	
24	Katie Hobbs*	Democrat	
25	Bob Worsley*	Republican	
26	Ed Ableser*	Democrat	Resigned September 30, 2015
26	Andrew Sherwood	Democrat	Appointed November 4, 2015
27	Catherine Miranda	Democrat	
28	Adam Driggs*	Republican	
29	Martin Quezada	Democrat	
30	Robert Meza*	Democrat	

== House of Representatives ==
=== Members ===
The asterisk (*) denotes members of the previous Legislature who continued in office as members of this Legislature.

District	Representative	Party	Notes
1	Karen Fann*	Republican	
1	Noel W. Campbell	Republican	
2	J. Christopher Ackerley	Republican	
2	Rosanna Gabaldon*	Democrat	
3	Sally Ann Gonzales*	Democrat	
3	Macario Saldate*	Democrat	
4	Charlene Fernandez	Democrat	
4	Lisa Otondo*	Democrat	
5	Sonny Borrelli*	Republican	
5	Regina Cobb	Republican	
6	Brenda Barton*	Republican	
6	Bob Thorpe*	Republican	
7	Albert Hale*	Democrat	
7	Jennifer D. Benally	Democrat	
8	Frank Pratt*	Republican	
8	Thomas R. Shope Jr.*	Republican	
9	Victoria Steele*	Democrat	Resigned January 12, 2016
9	Randall Friese	Democrat	
9	Matt Kopec	Democrat	Appointed January 19, 2016 to replace Steele
10	Stefanie Mach*	Democrat	
10	Bruce Wheeler*	Democrat	
11	Mark Finchem	Republican	
11	Vince Leach	Republican	
12	Edwin W. Farnsworth*	Republican	
12	Warren Petersen*	Republican	
13	Darin Mitchell*	Republican	
13	Steve B. Montenegro*	Republican	
14	David Gowan*	Republican	
14	David W. Stevens*	Republican	
15	John Allen*	Republican	
15	Heather Carter*	Republican	
16	Doug Coleman*	Republican	
16	Kelly Townsend*	Republican	
17	Jeff Weninger	Republican	
17	J. D. Mesnard*	Republican	
18	Jill Norgaard	Republican	
18	Bob Robson*	Republican	
19	Mark A. Cardenas*	Democrat	
19	Diego Espinoza	Democrat	
20	Paul Boyer*	Republican	
20	Anthony Kern	Republican	
21	Rick Gray*	Republican	
21	Tony Rivero	Republican	
22	David Livingston*	Republican	
22	Phil Lovas*	Republican	
23	Jay Lawrence	Republican	
23	Michelle Ugenti*	Republican	
24	Lela Alston*	Democrat	
24	Ken Clark	Democrat	
25	Justin Olson*	Republican	
25	Russell Bowers	Republican	
26	Juan Mendez*	Democrat	
26	Andrew C. Sherwood*	Democrat	Appointed on November 4, 2015 to Senate
26	Celeste Plumlee	Democrat	Appointed on December 9, 2015 to replace Sherwood
27	Reginald Bolding	Democrat	
27	Rebecca Rios	Democrat	
28	Kate Brophy McGee*	Republican	
28	Eric Meyer*	Democrat	
29	Richard C. Andrade	Democrat	
29	Ceci Velasquez	Democrat	
30	Jonathan Larkin	Democrat	
30	Debbie McCune Davis*	Democrat	
