= 2014 Arizona Senate election =

- November 4, 2014

All 30 seats of the Arizona Senate 16 seats needed for a majority
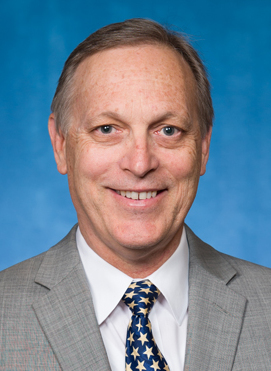

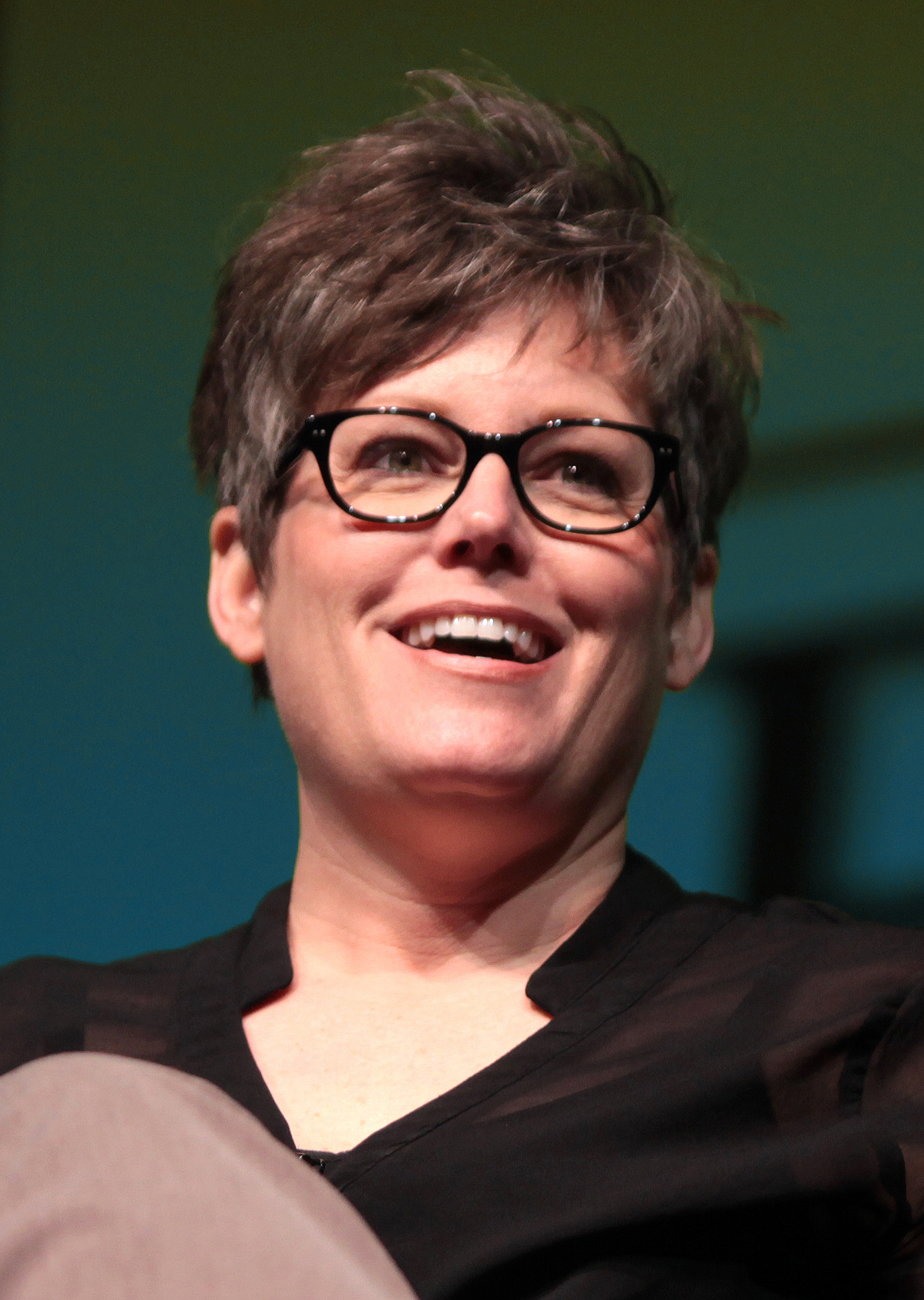
	Majority party	Minority party
Leader	Andy Biggs	Katie Hobbs
Party	Republican	Democratic
Leader's seat	12th	24th
Seats before	17	13
Seats after	17	13
Seat change	Steady	Steady
Popular vote	768,754	553,002
Percentage	55.79%	40.13%
Swing	▲1.27%	▼2.17%
- Results: Democratic hold Republican hold
Senate President before election
Andy Biggs
Republican
Elected Senate President
Andy Biggs
Republican

The 2014 Arizona Senate election was held on November 4, 2014. Voters elected members of the Arizona Senate in all 30 of the state's legislative districts to serve a two-year term. Primary elections were held on August 26, 2014.

Prior to the elections, the Republicans held a majority of 17 seats over the Democrats' 13 seats.

Following the election, Republicans maintained control of the chamber and their majority of 17 Republicans to 13 Democrats remained unchanged.

The newly elected senators served in the 52nd Arizona State Legislature.

== Retiring Incumbents ==
=== Democrats ===
1. District 19: Anna Tovar
2. District 27: Leah Landrum

=== Republicans ===
1. District 6: Alice Crandell (Note: Republican Alice Crandell, the widow of former Republican Senator Chester Crandell, was sworn in September 24, 2014 to replace her deceased husband who died on August 4, 2014.)
2. District 11: Al Melvin
3. District 18: John McComish
4. District 21: Rick Murphy
5. District 23: Michele Reagan (Note: Ran for Arizona Secretary of State and won.)

== Predictions ==
Source	Ranking	As of
Governing	Likely R	October 20, 2014

== Summary of Results by Arizona State Legislative District ==
District	Incumbent	Party	Elected Senator	Outcome
1st	Steve Pierce	Rep	Steve Pierce	Rep Hold
2nd	Andrea Dalessandro (Note: Democrat Andrea Dalessandro was sworn in January 22, 2014 to replace Democratic Senator Linda Lopez who resigned on January 13, 2014.)	Dem	Andrea Dalessandro	Dem Hold
3rd	Olivia Cajero Bedford	Dem	Olivia Cajero Bedford	Dem Hold
4th	Lynne Pancrazi	Dem	Lynne Pancrazi	Dem Hold
5th	Kelli Ward	Rep	Kelli Ward (Note: Republican Sue Donahue was sworn in January 7, 2016 to replace Republican Senator Kelli Ward who resigned on December 15, 2015.)	Rep Hold
6th	Alice Crandell	Rep	Sylvia Tenney Allen	Rep Hold
7th	Carlyle W. Begay (Note: Democrat Carlyle Begay was sworn in August 6, 2013 to replace Democratic Senator Jack C. Jackson Jr. who resigned on July 12, 2013.)	Dem	Carlyle W. Begay (Note: Senator Carlyle Begay changed political party affiliation on November 23, 2015, from Democrat to Republican.)	Dem Hold
8th	Barbara McGuire	Dem	Barbara McGuire	Dem Hold
9th	Steve Farley	Dem	Steve Farley	Dem Hold
10th	David Bradley	Dem	David Bradley	Dem Hold
11th	Al Melvin	Rep	Steve Smith	Rep Hold
12th	Andy Biggs	Rep	Andy Biggs	Rep Hold
13th	Don Shooter	Rep	Don Shooter	Rep Hold
14th	Gail Griffin	Rep	Gail Griffin	Rep Hold
15th	Nancy Barto	Rep	Nancy Barto	Rep Hold
16th	David Christian Farnsworth (Note: Republican David Christian Farnsworth was sworn in September 12, 2013 to replace Republican Senator Rich Crandall who resigned on August 31, 2013.)	Rep	David Christian Farnsworth	Rep Hold
17th	Steve Yarbrough	Rep	Steve Yarbrough	Rep Hold
18th	John McComish	Rep	Jeff Dial	Rep Hold
19th	Anna Tovar	Dem	Lupe Chavira Contreras	Dem Hold
20th	Kimberly Yee	Rep	Kimberly Yee	Rep Hold
21st	Rick Murphy	Rep	Debbie Lesko	Rep Hold
22nd	Judy M. Burges	Rep	Judy M. Burges	Rep Hold
23rd	Michele Reagan	Rep	John Kavanagh	Rep Hold
24th	Katie Hobbs	Dem	Katie Hobbs	Dem Hold
25th	Bob Worsley	Rep	Bob Worsley	Rep Hold
26th	Ed Ableser	Dem	Ed Ableser (Note: Democrat Andrew Sherwood was sworn in November 5, 2015 to replace Democratic Senator Ed Ableser who resigned on September 30, 2015.)	Dem Hold
27th	Leah Landrum	Dem	Catherine Miranda	Dem Hold
28th	Adam Driggs	Rep	Adam Driggs	Rep Hold
29th	Steve Gallardo	Dem	Martín J. Quezada	Dem Hold
30th	Robert Meza	Dem	Robert Meza	Dem Hold

== Detailed Results ==
=== District 1 ===
Republican primary results
Party	Candidate	Votes	%
Republican	Steve Pierce (incumbent)	28,214	100.00%
Total votes		28,214	100.00%

General election results
Party	Candidate	Votes	%
Republican	Steve Pierce (incumbent)	55,273	99.75%
Independent	Teri Frost (Note: Was a write-in candidate in the general election.)	139	0.25%
Total votes		55,412	100.00%
Republican hold			

=== District 2 ===
Democratic primary results
Party	Candidate	Votes	%
Democratic	Andrea Dalessandro (incumbent)	10,754	100.00%
Total votes		10,754	100.00%

Republican primary results
Party	Candidate	Votes	%
Republican	Daniel Estrella	9,333	100.00%
Total votes		9,333	100.00%

General election results
Party	Candidate	Votes	%
Democratic	Andrea Dalessandro (incumbent)	22,901	55.04%
Republican	Daniel Estrella	18,707	44.96%
Total votes		41,608	100.00%
Democratic hold			

=== District 3 ===
Democratic primary results
Party	Candidate	Votes	%
Democratic	Olivia Cajero Bedford (incumbent)	7,087	59.01%
Democratic	Salomón F. Baldenegro	4,923	40.99%
Total votes		12,010	100.00%

General election results
Party	Candidate	Votes	%
Democratic	Olivia Cajero Bedford (incumbent)	27,034	100.00%
Total votes		27,034	100.00%
Democratic hold			

=== District 4 ===
Democratic primary results
Party	Candidate	Votes	%
Democratic	Lynne Pancrazi (incumbent)	6,829	100.00%
Total votes		6,829	100.00%

Republican primary results
Party	Candidate	Votes	%
Republican	Connie Uribe	5,846	100.00%
Total votes		5,846	100.00%

General election results
Party	Candidate	Votes	%
Democratic	Lynne Pancrazi (incumbent)	14,464	53.80%
Republican	Connie Uribe	12,423	46.20%
Total votes		26,887	100.00%
Democratic hold			

=== District 5 ===
Republican primary results
Party	Candidate	Votes	%
Republican	Kelli Ward (incumbent)	19,439	100.00%
Total votes		19,439	100.00%

General election results
Party	Candidate	Votes	%
Republican	Kelli Ward (incumbent)	38,507	100.00%
Total votes		38,507	100.00%
Republican hold			

=== District 6 ===
Republican primary results
Party	Candidate	Votes	%
Republican	Chester Crandell (incumbent)	14,721	100.00%
Total votes		14,721	100.00%

General election results
Party	Candidate	Votes	%
Republican	Sylvia Tenney Allen	31,845	51.32%
Independent	Tom O'Halleran	30,207	48.68%
Total votes		62,052	100.00%
Republican hold			

=== District 7 ===
Democratic primary results
Party	Candidate	Votes	%
Democratic	Carlyle W. Begay (incumbent)	10,331	43.17%
Democratic	Eric Descheenie	6,900	28.83%
Democratic	Jamescita Peshlakai	6,700	28.00%
Total votes		23,931	100.00%

Americans Elect Results
Party	Candidate	Votes	%
Americans Elect	Kelly Gneiting (Note: Was a write-in candidate in the primary election.)	7	100.00%
Total votes		7	100.00%

General election results
Party	Candidate	Votes	%
Democratic	Carlyle W. Begay (incumbent)	38,513	83.71%
Americans Elect	Kelly Gneiting	7,494	16.29%
Total votes		46,007	100.00%
Democratic hold			

=== District 8 ===
Democratic primary results
Party	Candidate	Votes	%
Democratic	Barbara McGuire (incumbent)	8,766	100.00%
Total votes		8,766	100.00%

Republican primary results
Party	Candidate	Votes	%
Republican	Irene Littleton	5,004	49.43%
Republican	Harold W. Vangilder	2,767	27.33%
Republican	Alan Pease	2,352	23.23%
Total votes		10,123	100.00%

Libertarian Primary Results
Party	Candidate	Votes	%
Libertarian	Kevin Sullivan	3	100.00%
Total votes		3	100.00%

General election results
Party	Candidate	Votes	%
Democratic	Barbara McGuire (incumbent)	17,654	50.71%
Republican	Irene Littleton	17,157	49.29%
Total votes		34,811	100.00%
Democratic hold			

=== District 9 ===
Democratic primary results
Party	Candidate	Votes	%
Democratic	Steve Farley (incumbent)	15,735	100.00%
Total votes		15,735	100.00%

General election results
Party	Candidate	Votes	%
Democratic	Steve Farley (incumbent)	45,890	100.00%
Total votes		45,890	100.00%
Democratic hold			

=== District 10 ===
Democratic primary results
Party	Candidate	Votes	%
Democratic	David Bradley (incumbent)	15,261	100.00%
Total votes		15,261	100.00%

Republican primary results
Party	Candidate	Votes	%
Republican	Mark Morrison	15,820	100.00%
Total votes		15,820	100.00%

General election results
Party	Candidate	Votes	%
Democratic	David Bradley (incumbent)	34,334	52.31%
Republican	Mark Morrison	31,307	47.69%
Total votes		65,641	100.00%
Democratic hold			

=== District 11 ===
Democratic primary results
Party	Candidate	Votes	%
Democratic	Jo Holt	11,201	100.00%
Total votes		11,201	100.00%

Republican primary results
Party	Candidate	Votes	%
Republican	Steve Smith	15,956	69.92%
Republican	Scott Bartle	6,863	30.08%
Total votes		22,819	100.00%

General election results
Party	Candidate	Votes	%
Republican	Steve Smith	38,397	59.05%
Democratic	Jo Holt	26,628	40.95%
Total votes		65,025	100.00%
Republican hold			

=== District 12 ===
Democratic primary results
Party	Candidate	Votes	%
Democratic	Scott Glover	5,059	100.00%
Total votes		5,059	100.00%

Republican primary results
Party	Candidate	Votes	%
Republican	Andy Biggs (incumbent)	18,653	100.00%
Total votes		18,653	100.00%

General election results
Party	Candidate	Votes	%
Republican	Andy Biggs (incumbent)	35,820	65.20%
Democratic	Scott Glover	19,117	34.80%
Total votes		54,937	100.00%
Republican hold			

=== District 13 ===
Democratic primary results
Party	Candidate	Votes	%
Democratic	Terri Woodmansee	5,832	100.00%
Total votes		5,832	100.00%

Republican primary results
Party	Candidate	Votes	%
Republican	Don Shooter (incumbent)	11,794	64.66%
Republican	Toby Farmer	6,446	35.34%
Total votes		18,240	100.00%

General election results
Party	Candidate	Votes	%
Republican	Don Shooter (incumbent)	28,645	64.34%
Democratic	Terri Woodmansee	15,874	35.66%
Total votes		44,519	100.00%
Republican hold			

=== District 14 ===
Republican primary results
Party	Candidate	Votes	%
Republican	Gail Griffin (incumbent)	19,888	100.00%
Total votes		19,888	100.00%

General election results
Party	Candidate	Votes	%
Republican	Gail Griffin (incumbent)	46,564	100.00%
Total votes		46,564	100.00%
Republican hold			

=== District 15 ===
Republican primary results
Party	Candidate	Votes	%
Republican	Nancy Barto (incumbent)	13,585	62.90%
Republican	David Ryan	8,012	37.10%
Total votes		21,597	100.00%

General election results
Party	Candidate	Votes	%
Republican	Nancy Barto (incumbent)	43,363	100.00%
Total votes		43,363	100.00%
Republican hold			

=== District 16 ===
Democratic primary results
Party	Candidate	Votes	%
Democratic	Scott Prior	6,314	100.00%
Total votes		6,314	100.00%

Republican primary results
Party	Candidate	Votes	%
Republican	David Christian Farnsworth (incumbent)	10,705	55.46%
Republican	Taylor McArthur	8,597	44.54%
Total votes		19,302	100.00%

General election results
Party	Candidate	Votes	%
Republican	David Christian Farnsworth (incumbent)	31,659	65.90%
Democratic	Scott Prior	16,382	34.10%
Total votes		48,041	100.00%
Republican hold			

=== District 17 ===
Democratic primary results
Party	Candidate	Votes	%
Democratic	Kristie O'Brien	7,415	100.00%
Total votes		7,415	100.00%

Republican primary results
Party	Candidate	Votes	%
Republican	Steve Yarbrough (incumbent)	17,958	100.00%
Total votes		17,958	100.00%

General election results
Party	Candidate	Votes	%
Republican	Steve Yarbrough (incumbent)	32,598	60.13%
Democratic	Kristie O'Brien	21,619	39.87%
Total votes		54,217	100.00%
Republican hold			

=== District 18 ===
Democratic primary results
Party	Candidate	Votes	%
Democratic	Janie Hydrick	10,946	100.00%
Total votes		10,946	100.00%

Republican primary results
Party	Candidate	Votes	%
Republican	Jeff Dial	12,886	59.81%
Republican	Tom Morrissey	8,659	40.19%
Total votes		21,545	100.00%

General election results
Party	Candidate	Votes	%
Republican	Jeff Dial	34,522	53.73%
Democratic	Janie Hydrick	29,723	46.27%
Total votes		64,245	100.00%
Republican hold			

=== District 19 ===
Democratic primary results
Party	Candidate	Votes	%
Democratic	Lupe Chavira Contreras	3,106	53.53%
Democratic	Angela Cotera	2,696	46.47%
Total votes		5,802	100.00%

Republican primary results
Party	Candidate	Votes	%
Republican	Joseph "Joe" Hobbs	189	100.00%
Total votes		189	100.00%

General election results
Party	Candidate	Votes	%
Democratic	Lupe Chavira Contreras	12,811	62.32%
Republican	Joseph "Joe" Hobbs	7,747	37.68%
Total votes		20,558	100.00%
Democratic hold			

=== District 20 ===
Democratic primary results
Party	Candidate	Votes	%
Democratic	Patty Kennedy	7,819	100.00%
Total votes		7,819	100.00%

Republican primary results
Party	Candidate	Votes	%
Republican	Kimberly Yee (incumbent)	15,259	100.00%
Total votes		15,259	100.00%

General election results
Party	Candidate	Votes	%
Republican	Kimberly Yee (incumbent)	25,103	53.24%
Democratic	Patty Kennedy	16,613	35.23%
Independent	Doug "Q" Quelland	5,438	11.53%
Total votes		47,154	100.00%
Republican hold			

=== District 21 ===
Democratic primary results
Party	Candidate	Votes	%
Democratic	Carolyn Vasko	8,371	100.00%
Total votes		8,371	100.00%

Republican primary results
Party	Candidate	Votes	%
Republican	Debbie Lesko	18,195	100.00%
Total votes		18,195	100.00%

General election results
Party	Candidate	Votes	%
Republican	Debbie Lesko	32,119	63.22%
Democratic	Carolyn Vasko	18,687	36.78%
Total votes		50,806	100.00%
Republican hold			

=== District 22 ===
Democratic primary results
Party	Candidate	Votes	%
Democratic	Archangel "Arky" Muscato	8,314	100.00%
Total votes		8,314	100.00%

Republican primary results
Party	Candidate	Votes	%
Republican	Judy M. Burges (incumbent)	25,105	100.00%
Total votes		25,105	100.00%

General election results
Party	Candidate	Votes	%
Republican	Judy M. Burges (incumbent)	48,046	69.51%
Democratic	Archangel "Arky" Muscato	21,079	30.49%
Total votes		69,125	100.00%
Republican hold			

=== District 23 ===
Democratic primary results
Party	Candidate	Votes	%
Democratic	Paula Pennypacker	8,720	100.00%
Total votes		8,720	100.00%

Republican primary results
Party	Candidate	Votes	%
Republican	John Kavanagh	17,227	53.33%
Republican	Jeff Schwartz	15,075	46.67%
Total votes		32,302	100.00%

General election results
Party	Candidate	Votes	%
Republican	John Kavanagh	49,649	62.48%
Democratic	Paula Pennypacker	29,810	37.52%
Total votes		79,459	100.00%
Republican hold			

=== District 24 ===
Democratic primary results
Party	Candidate	Votes	%
Democratic	Katie Hobbs (incumbent)	11,117	100.00%
Total votes		11,117	100.00%

Republican primary results
Party	Candidate	Votes	%
Republican	Bill Follette	7,285	100.00%
Total votes		7,285	100.00%

General election results
Party	Candidate	Votes	%
Democratic	Katie Hobbs (incumbent)	25,130	66.14%
Republican	Bill Follette	12,867	33.86%
Total votes		37,997	100.00%
Democratic hold			

=== District 25 ===
Democratic primary results
Party	Candidate	Votes	%
Democratic	Steven Zachary	6,652	100.00%
Total votes		6,652	100.00%

Republican primary results
Party	Candidate	Votes	%
Republican	Bob Worsley (incumbent)	15,473	52.81%
Republican	Ralph Heap	13,827	47.19%
Total votes		29,300	100.00%

General election results
Party	Candidate	Votes	%
Republican	Bob Worsley (incumbent)	38,505	70.46%
Democratic	Steven Zachary	16,140	29.54%
Total votes		54,645	100.00%
Republican hold			

=== District 26 ===
Democratic primary results
Party	Candidate	Votes	%
Democratic	Ed Ableser (incumbent)	6,127	100.00%
Total votes		6,127	100.00%

General election results
Party	Candidate	Votes	%
Democratic	Ed Ableser (incumbent)	14,845	58.43%
Independent	Dale Eames	10,563	41.57%
Total votes		25,408	100.00%
Democratic hold			

=== District 27 ===
Democratic primary results
Party	Candidate	Votes	%
Democratic	Catherine Miranda	5,672	54.51%
Democratic	Aaron Marquez	4,733	45.49%
Total votes		10,405	100.00%

Republican primary results
Party	Candidate	Votes	%
Republican	Natalie Taswell	151	100.00%
Total votes		151	100.00%

General election results
Party	Candidate	Votes	%
Democratic	Catherine Miranda	17,917	74.30%
Republican	Natalie Taswell	6,198	25.70%
Total votes		24,115	100.00%
Democratic hold			

=== District 28 ===
Democratic primary results
Party	Candidate	Votes	%
Democratic	Kelli Butler	11,051	100.00%
Total votes		11,051	100.00%

Republican primary results
Party	Candidate	Votes	%
Republican	Adam Driggs (incumbent)	20,913	100.00%
Total votes		20,913	100.00%

Libertarian Primary Results
Party	Candidate	Votes	%
Libertarian	Jim Iannuzo	204	100.00%
Total votes		204	100.00%

General election results
Party	Candidate	Votes	%
Republican	Adam Driggs (incumbent)	34,455	53.21%
Democratic	Kelli Butler	27,902	43.09%
Libertarian	Jim Iannuzo	2,392	3.69%
Total votes		64,749	100.00%
Republican hold			

=== District 29 ===
Democratic primary results
Party	Candidate	Votes	%
Democratic	Martín J. Quezada	3,342	50.68%
Democratic	Lydia Hernandez	3,252	49.32%
Total votes		6,594	100.00%

Republican primary results
Party	Candidate	Votes	%
Republican	Crystal Nuttle	3,734	100.00%
Total votes		3,734	100.00%

General election results
Party	Candidate	Votes	%
Democratic	Martín J. Quezada	12,133	60.26%
Republican	Crystal Nuttle	8,002	39.74%
Total votes		20,135	100.00%
Democratic hold			

=== District 30 ===
Democratic primary results
Party	Candidate	Votes	%
Democratic	Robert Meza (incumbent)	6,225	100.00%
Total votes		6,225	100.00%

Republican primary results
Party	Candidate	Votes	%
Republican	Gary Cox	5,059	100.00%
Total votes		5,059	100.00%

General election results
Party	Candidate	Votes	%
Democratic	Robert Meza (incumbent)	12,802	57.99%
Republican	Gary Cox	9,276	42.01%
Total votes		22,078	100.00%
Democratic hold			
