= 2014 Arizona Secretary of State election =

- November 4, 2014
- Turnout: 46.1% ▼
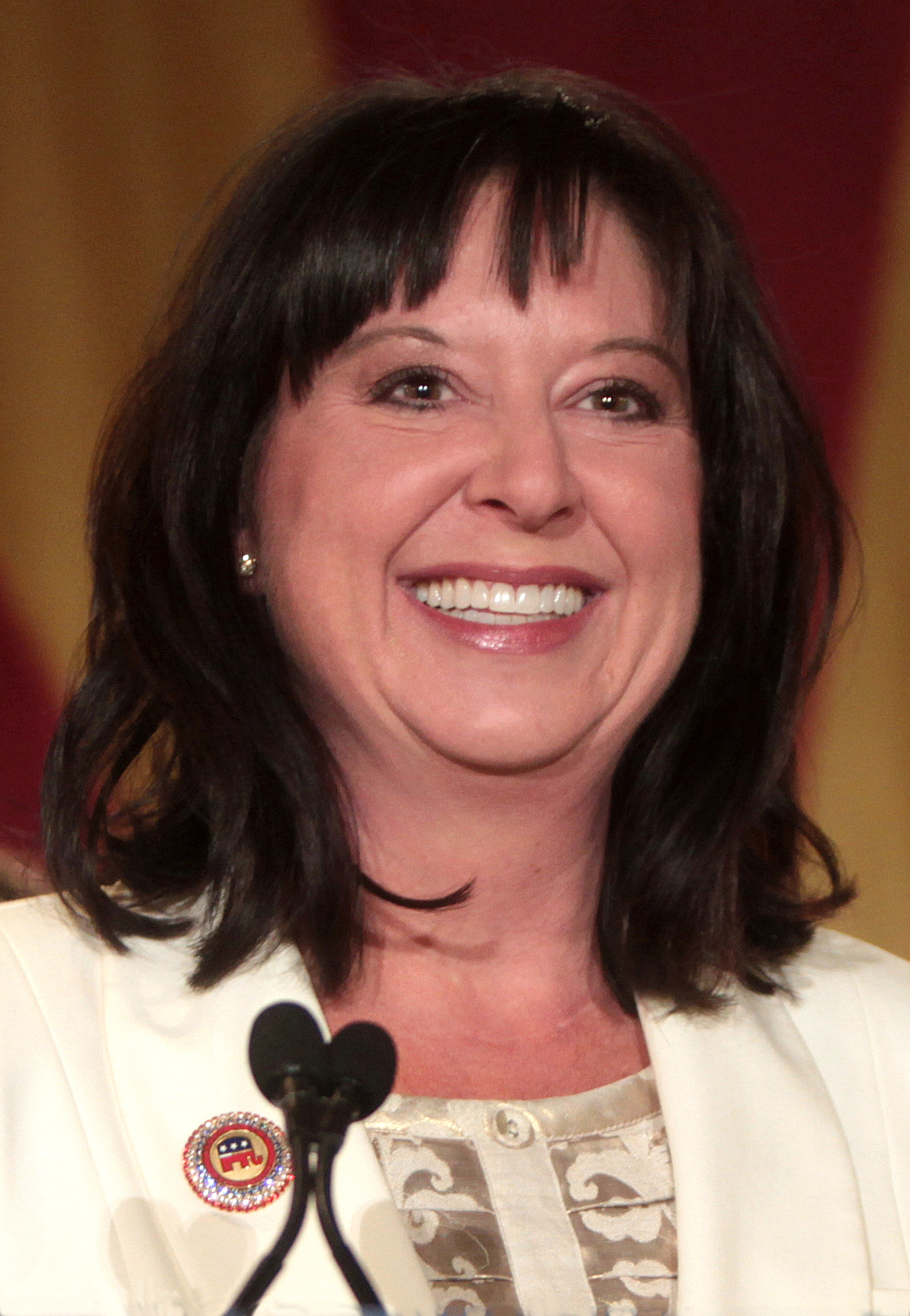

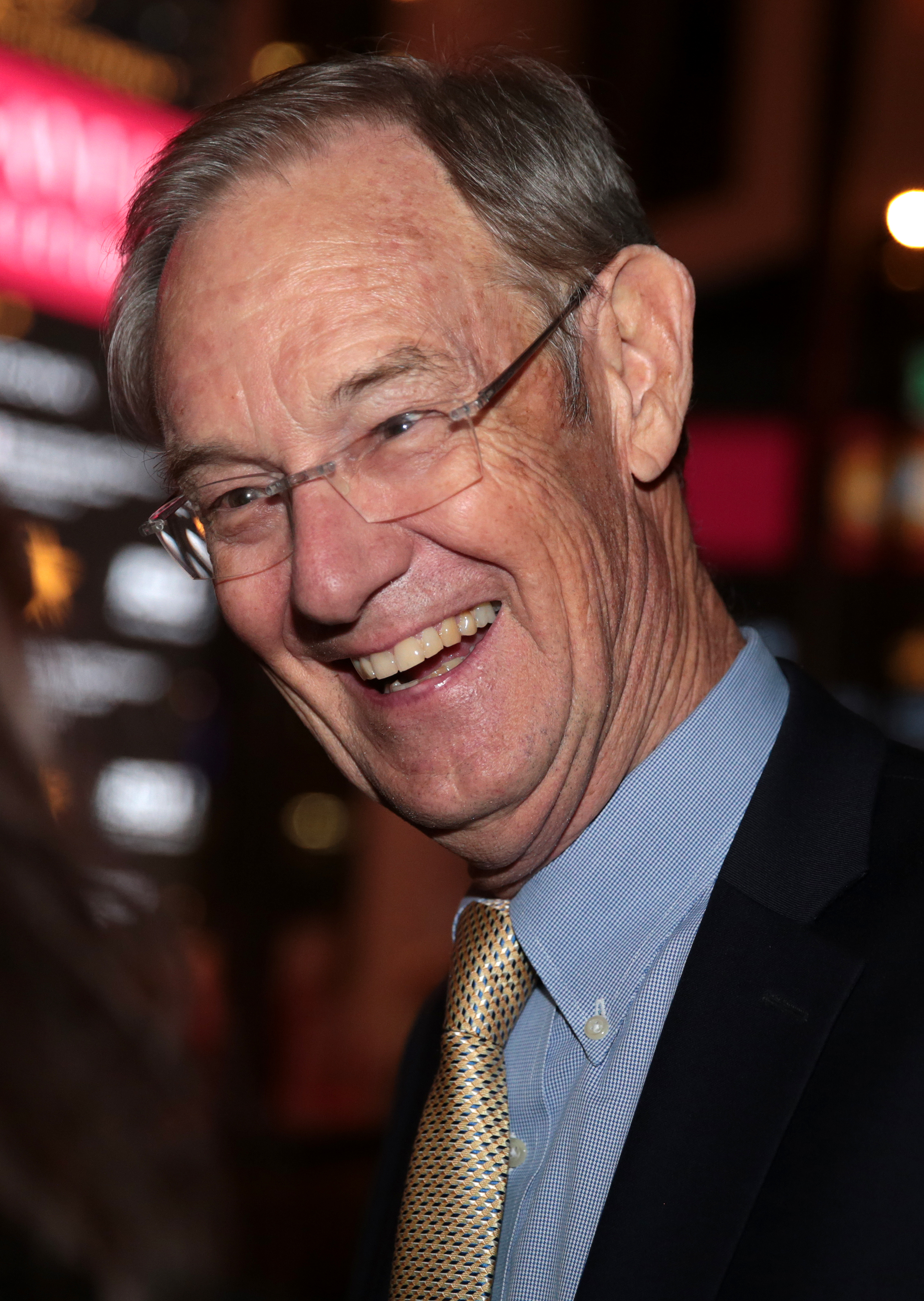
Nominee	Michele Reagan	Terry Goddard
Party	Republican	Democratic
Popular vote	779,226	712,918
Percentage	52.2%	47.8%
- Reagan: 50–60% 60–70% 70–80% Goddard: 50–60% 60–70% 70–80%
Secretary of State before election
Ken Bennett
Republican
Elected Secretary of State
Michele Reagan
Republican

The 2014 Arizona Secretary of State election took place on November 4, 2018, to elect the Secretary of State of Arizona, concurrently with other statewide elections, including for governor and U.S. House.

Incumbent Republican Secretary of State Ken Bennett was term-limited and ineligible to run for a third term in office. He instead ran unsuccessfully for the Republican nomination for governor. Republican nominee Michele Reagan succeeded Bennett and won the election against Democratic challenger Terry Goddard.

As of 2024, this is the last time that a Republican was elected Secretary of State in Arizona.

== Republican primary ==
=== Candidates ===
- Wil Cardon, businessman and candidate for U.S. Senate in 2012
- Justin Pierce, state representative
- Michele Reagan, state senator and former state representative

=== Campaign ===
Wil Cardon was initially considered the front-runner, but support for him collapsed in the wake of revelations that six of his siblings were suing him for more than $6 million of family money that they allege he used in his campaign for the U.S. Senate in 2012, despite it not being his to use.

=== Polling ===
Poll source	Date(s) administered	Sample size	Margin of error	Wil Cardon	Justin Pierce	Michele Reagan	Undecided
Magellan Strategies	August 17–21, 2014	1,281	± 2.7%	18%	27%	33%	22%
Harper Polling	August 19–20, 2014	812	± 3.4%	15%	30%	32%	23%
Magellan Strategies	August 15–18, 2014	1,322	± ?	18%	26%	33%	23%
Magellan Strategies	August 12–15, 2014	1,300	± ?	17%	23%	33%	27%
Magellan Strategies	August 5–7, 2014	1,289	± 2.7%	16%	27%	27%	30%
Magellan Strategies	July 28–31, 2014	1,644	± ?	19%	18%	31%	32%
Harper Polling	July 16–17, 2014	885	± 3.3%	19%	19%	21%	40%
Gravis Marketing	July 14, 2014	691	± 4%	13%	17%	13%	57%
Magellan Strategies	July 9–10, 2014	593	± 4.0%	17%	9%	21%	53%
Harper Polling	June 25–26, 2014	791	± 3.5%	20%	13%	22%	44%
Magellan Strategies	June 3–4, 2014	630	± 3.9%	18%	15%	20%	47%
Magellan Strategies	May 13–14, 2014	760	± 3.6%	20%	12%	17%	51%

==== Debate ====
2014 Arizona Secretary of State election republican primary debates
No.	Date	Host	Moderator	Link	Republican	Republican	Republican
Key: P Participant A Absent N Not invited I Invited W Withdrawn							
Key: P Participant A Absent N Not invited I Invited W Withdrawn					Michele Reagan	Justin Pierce	Wil Cardon
1	Jun. 30, 2014	Arizona PBS	Ted Simons	PBS	P	P	P

=== Results ===
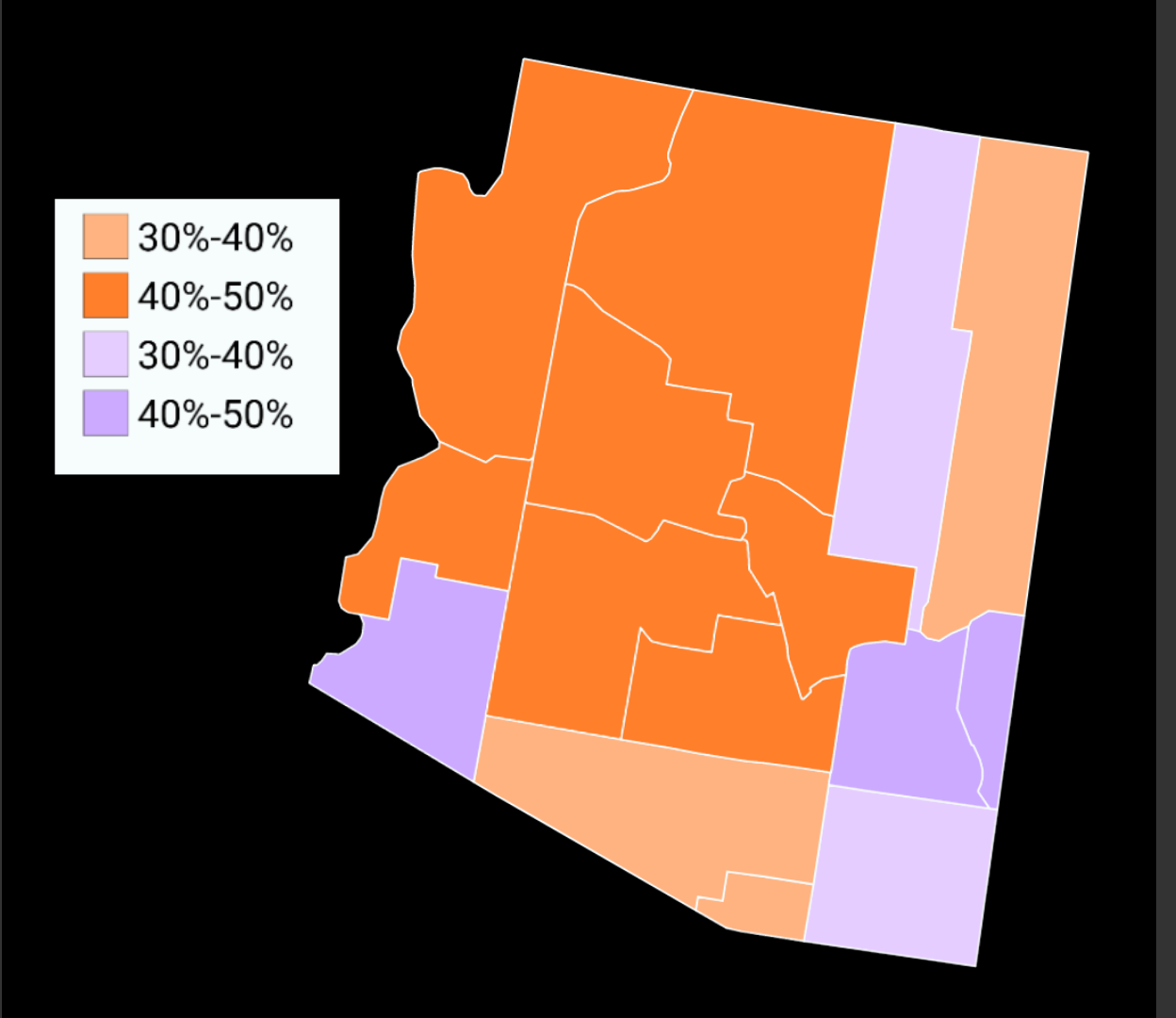
Republican primary results by county Legend: Reagan 30–40%; Reagan 40–50%; Pierce 30–40%; Pierce 40–50%

Republican primary
Party	Candidate	Votes	%
Republican	Michele Reagan	175,664	43.45
Republican	Justin Pierce	139,871	34.59
Republican	Wil Cardon	88,771	21.96
Total votes		404,306	100.00

== Democratic primary ==
=== Candidates ===
- Terry Goddard, former Attorney General and candidate for governor in 1990, 1994, and 2010

=== Results ===
Democratic primary
Party	Candidate	Votes	%
Democratic	Terry Goddard	252,761	98.82
Write-in		3,012	1.18
Total votes		255,773	100.00

== General election ==
=== Debate ===
2014 Arizona Secretary of State election debate
No.	Date	Host	Moderator	Link	Republican	Democratic
Key: P Participant A Absent N Not invited I Invited W Withdrawn						
Key: P Participant A Absent N Not invited I Invited W Withdrawn					Michele Reagan	Terry Goddard
1	Oct. 6, 2014	Arizona PBS	Ted Simons	PBS	P	P

=== Endorsements ===
Michele Reagan (R)
- Lydia Hernandez, state representative
- Catherine Miranda, state senator

=== Polling ===
Poll source	Date(s) administered	Sample size	Margin of error	Michele Reagan (R)	Terry Goddard (D)	Undecided
The Polling Company	October 20–22, 2014	601	± 4%	42%	42%	15%
Moore Information	October 7–8, 2014	400	± ≈4.9%	44%	46%	10%
The Polling Company	October 6–8, 2014	600	± 4%	45%	47%	8%

=== Results ===
2014 Arizona Secretary of State election
Party	Candidate	Votes	%	±%
Republican	Michele Reagan	779,226	52.22%	−5.99%
Democratic	Terry Goddard	712,918	47.78%	+5.99%
Total votes		1,492,144	100.00%	
Republican hold				

=== By congressional district ===
Despite losing the state, Goddard won five of nine congressional districts, including one that elected a Republican.

District	Reagan	Goddard	Representative
1st	48%	52%	Ann Kirkpatrick
2nd	48%	52%	Martha McSally
3rd	38%	62%	Raúl Grijalva
4th	67%	33%	Paul Gosar
5th	62%	38%	Matt Salmon
6th	56%	44%	David Schweikert
7th	28%	72%	Ruben Gallego
8th	59%	41%	Trent Franks
9th	44%	56%	Kyrsten Sinema
