= César Chávez (politician) =

Mexican-American politician and singer

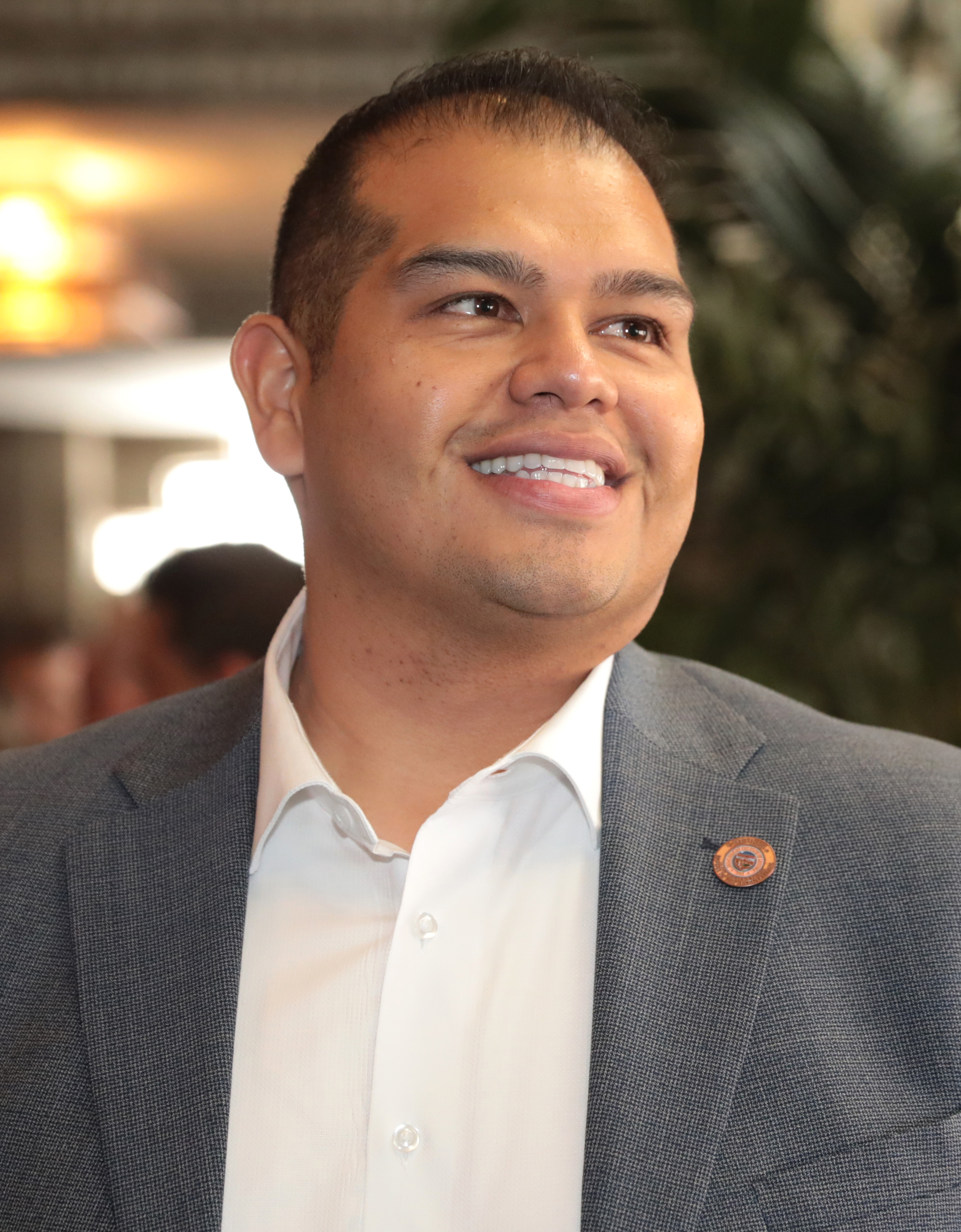

Member of the Arizona House of Representatives from the 29th district
- In office January 9, 2017 – January 9, 2023 Serving with Richard Andrade
- Preceded by: Ceci Velasquez
- Succeeded by: Austin Smith (redistricting)

Personal details
- Born: October 30, 1987 (age 38) Guanajuato, Mexico
- Party: Democratic

César Chávez (born October 30, 1987) is a Mexican-American singer and politician. A member of the Democratic Party, he served in the Arizona House of Representatives, representing Arizona's 29th legislative district, from 2017 to 2023. Prior to entering politics, Chávez travelled internationally as a Mariachi vocalist.

== Early life ==
Chávez was born in Guanajuato, Mexico and immigrated to the United States at the age of three.

== Arizona House of Representatives (2017-2023) ==
In 2016, Chávez and incumbent Richard Andrade won the Democratic primary. They went on to defeat Republican John Wilson in the general election.

He is openly gay, and served alongside two other openly LGBTQ legislators: Daniel Hernández Jr. and Robert Meza. On October 11, 2017, (National Coming Out Day), the three lawmakers announced the creation of an LGBTQ Caucus in the legislature.

In 2020, he endorsed Mike Bloomberg for president at a rally in Downtown Phoenix where he introduced him.

In 2022, Chavez ran for the Arizona Senate, but lost to political newcomer Anna Hernandez in the Democratic primary in August 2022.
