= Bob Littlefield =

American politician

Robert W. "Bob" Littlefield was a Scottsdale, Arizona city councilman. Littlefield served out the three-term city charter-mandated limit at the beginning of 2015.

== Personal life ==
Littlefield's wife Kathy ran for and won a seat on the Scottsdale city council in 2014.

== Business and community involvement ==
Bob Littlefield is the founder and president of NetXpert Systems, Inc., a Scottsdale-based computer company. He also is a commercial pilot and flight instructor, specializing in "glass cockpit" (electronic flight instrument system) transition training. His book Glass Cockpit Flying is aimed at enhancing safety and proficiency for what the FAA calls "Technically Advanced Airplanes" (TAAs).

Littlefield's corporate career spanned 17 years as an engineer, sales executive, sales manager, and general manager for Prime Computer, DataPhaz, Apollo, and Hewlett-Packard. He was a director of the Arizona Software & Internet Association (now part of the Arizona Technology Council).

Littlefield is a member of the American Legion, the Kiwanis, the Arizona Pilot's Association, the Arizona Business Aviation Association, and Civitan International. Still an active youth soccer referee, Littlefield served 11 years on the board of the Arcadia Scottsdale United Soccer Club "Blackhawks" (now Scottsdale Soccer). He spent 20 years as a youth soccer and baseball coach.

== Political career ==
Running on a platform of protecting suburban neighborhoods and rural areas from gentrification, Littlefield won his seat on the Scottsdale City Council in November 2002, and was reelected to his second term in 2006. Littlefield was reelected again to his third term in 2010. He was in a virtual tie for the most votes in that election.

In 2010, the Arizona Republic reported that in his eight years on the City Council, Littlefield had "challenged popular development projects, stood behind a city-run fire department and supported the Foothills Overlay and scenic corridors." In 2014, Littlefield was strongly opposed to a nine-point economic-development action plan for the City of Scottsdale. Among other objections, Littlefield said the plan was "drowning in buzzwords" and opposed a proposal to add marketing to the list of duties of the city economic development department. Littlefield was firmly opposed to the city's hospitality trolley, "which carries riders to some of the city's most popular destinations during tourist season," saying in 2014: "It didn't work, it cost a ton of money and it's time to put a stake through the heart and end it."

Littlefield and council allies Tony Nelssen and Guy Phillips frequently sparred with Lane and the council majority over budget deficits, municipal debt, and inadequate funding for the city's capital projects and maintenance.

During his time on the city council, Littlefield served as:

- Chairman of Scottsdale's Council Subcommittee on Water Issues
- Member of Scottsdale's Audit Committee
- Member of Scottsdale's WestWorld Council Subcommittee
- Chairman of Scottsdale's City Council Budget Subcommittee, 2004 and 2006
- Chairman of Scottsdale's Council Subcommittee on Regional Aviation Issues, 2005
- Scottsdale's representative to the Regional Public Transportation Authority (RPTA, a.k.a. Valley Metro)
- Member of the Regional Public Transportation Authority (RPTA) Board of Directors' Budget and Finance Subcommittee
- Scottsdale's representative to the Papago Park Executive Committee
- Member of the Arizona Governor's Advisory Council on Aviation
- Scottsdale's representative to the Maricopa Association of Governments (MAG) Regional Aviation System Plan Policy Committee

The influx of significant dark money-funded attack ads resulting from the US Supreme Court's Citizens United decision thwarted Littlefield's 2014 bid for a Legislative District 23 seat in the Arizona House of Representatives.

In 2016, Littlefield ran for Mayor against incumbent Jim Lane, who was running for a third term. Littlefield lost the election decisively, losing to Lane 35 - 65 percent, and winning in only 1 of Scottsdale's 53 precincts.
