= Ceci Velasquez =

American politician

Member of the Arizona House of Representatives from the 29th district
- In office January 9, 2015 – January 9, 2017 Serving with Richard C. Andrade
- Preceded by: Lydia Hernandez
- Succeeded by: Cesar Chavez

Personal details
- Born: Phoenix, Arizona, U.S
- Party: Democratic
- Education: Phoenix College (AS); Arizona State University (BA)

Ceci Velasquez is an American politician and paralegal who served as a Democratic member of the Arizona House of Representatives from 2015 to 2017. She was convicted of fraud in 2016.

== Early life and education ==
Velasquez born and raised in Phoenix, Arizona and is a second-generation Mexican-American. Velasquez earned an Associate of Science from Phoenix College and a Bachelor of Arts in criminal justice from Arizona State University. She worked in social services for 12 years and founded the Arizona Guidance Organization, a nonprofit that provides support to families in the justice system.

== Arizona House of Representatives ==
=== Tenure ===
Velasquez was elected to the Arizona House of Representatives in 2014 alongside Cesar Chavez. She served on the Federalism and States' Rights and Rules committees.

=== Legal troubles and indictment ===
Upon election, it was discovered there was an outstanding warrant for her arrest due to failing to pay court fees from traffic violations in 2010.

Velasquez was indicted by an Arizona grand jury on May 23, 2016 with three felony counts: fraudulent schemes and practices; unlawful use of food stamps; and theft. Velasquez pleaded guilty to one count of unlawful use of food stamps, a Class 1 misdemeanor. She paid restitution for the amount and was sentenced to 12 months of supervised probation and 100 hours of community service.
