= Thurane Aung Khin =

American musician

Thurane Aung Khin (born December 16) is a co-founding member of Phoenix-based Christian rock band New Jerusalem and adult contemporary Christian duo Kenyon Grey.

Thurane signed NJ to Gray Dot Records/Bulletproof Music-Bulletboy, the label that originally signed Third Day.

He currently performs solo as a singer-songwriter and worship leader. He has worked on film scores, released music as a solo artist, and taken part in working with international Christian and secular charities, most notably World Vision.
