= Jamescita Peshlakai =

American politician

Member of the Arizona Senate from the 7th district
- In office January 9, 2017 – December 22, 2021
- Preceded by: Carlyle Begay
- Succeeded by: Theresa Hatathlie

Member of the Arizona House of Representatives from the 7th district
- In office January 14, 2013 – January 2015 Serving with Albert Hale
- Preceded by: Phil Stago
- Succeeded by: Jennifer D. Benally

Personal details
- Party: Democratic
- Parent: Mae Peshlakai (mother)
- Education: Northern Arizona University
- Website: http://www.peshforsenate.com

Military service
- Allegiance: United States
- Branch/service: United States Army
- Years of service: 1989–1997
- Battles/wars: Persian Gulf War

Jamescita Mae Peshlakai (IPA: /ˈd͡ʒeɪm.zi.ta meɪ pɛʃ.lɑ.kaɪ/) is a former Democratic member of the Arizona State Senate, serving from 2017 to 2021. She previously served in the Arizona House of Representatives from 2013 until 2015, and served as co-Minority Whip for the 2018 sitting of the state senate. Peshlakai is a member of the Navajo Nation. She served in the Persian Gulf War. Before her legislative service, Peshlakai provided agricultural outreach to Native Americans on behalf of the USDA.

== Early life and education ==
Peshlakai earned her bachelor's degree from Northern Arizona University in 1998 and her master's degree in educational psychology in 2004.

Peshlakai served in the U.S. Army from 1989 to 1997. She served in the Persian Gulf War from 1990 to 1991. After leaving the Army, she became lead coordinator for Navajo Nation Traditional Agricultural Outreach, a nonprofit group. She was also involved in protests of development in the San Francisco Peaks, such as the Arizona Snowbowl.

== Political career ==
=== Elections ===
In 2012 Peshlakai and incumbent Albert Hale defeated Phil Stago in the August 20212 Democratic primary for seats in the Arizona House of Representatives. They were unopposed in the general election on November 6, 2012.

In 2014, Peshlakai ran for the Arizona State Senate and was defeated in the Democratic primary by incumbent Carlyle Begay who went on to defeat Kelly Gneiting (Americans Elect of Arizona) in the general election.

In 2016, Begay did not seek re-election to the state Senate in order to run for Congress. Peshlakai defeated Steven Begay in the Senate District 7 Democratic primary. Begay's wife, Candace Begody-Begay, sought the Republican nomination but was removed from the ballot, and Peshlakai thus won the general election unopposed.

Peshlakai was re-elected to the state Senate in 2020. She was one of three Native American state senators re-elected that year (the others were Sally Ann Gonzales, of the Pascua Yaqui, and Victoria Steele of the Seneca.

=== Tenure ===
Peshlakai's district, Legislative District 7, covers northeast Arizona, including all of Apache County, most of Navajo County and Coconino County, and parts of Mohave, Gila and Graham counties. It encompasses the Navajo Nation and Hopi Reservation. Peshlakai lives in Cameron, Arizona.

During her tenure, Peshlakai sought greater funding for Native American infrastructure and education in her district, including for Diné College and Navajo Technical University. She resigned on December 22, 2021, to take a job at the U.S. Department of Interior.

== See also ==
- List of Native American politicians
- Native American women in politics
