= Roosevelt Elementary School District =

School district in Arizona, United States

Roosevelt School District #66

Location
- Phoenix, Arizona United States
- Coordinates: 33.3915°N 112.0664°W

District information
- Motto: Empower. Achieve. Succeed.
- Established: 1912
- Superintendent: Danelia Portillo-Verduzco
- NCES District ID: 0407080

Students and staff
- Students: 8,982 (2018–2019)
- Teachers: 462.00 (on FTE basis)
- Student–teacher ratio: 19.44

Other information
- Website: www.rsd66.org

The Roosevelt Elementary School District is a public school district located in the South Phoenix area of Phoenix, Arizona area. It has 19 schools.

The Roosevelt School District #66 was established in Phoenix, Arizona in 1912. The first Roosevelt School District School was located south of the Phoenix City Center on the corner of what is now 7th Street and Southern.

== Schools ==
- T. G. Barr Academy of Global Studies
- Bernard Black Entrepreneurial Academy
- Cloves C. Campbell Sr. Elementary School
- Cesar E. Chavez Community School
- Ignacio G. Conchos School
- C.O. Greenfield Academy of Design & Innovation
- Percy L. Julian School
- John F. Kennedy Academy of Inquiry
- Irene Lopez Academy of the Arts
- Ed and Verma Pastor Elementary School
- Southwest School
- Sunland STEAM Academy
- Valley View Leadership Academy
