= Rebecca Rios =

American politician

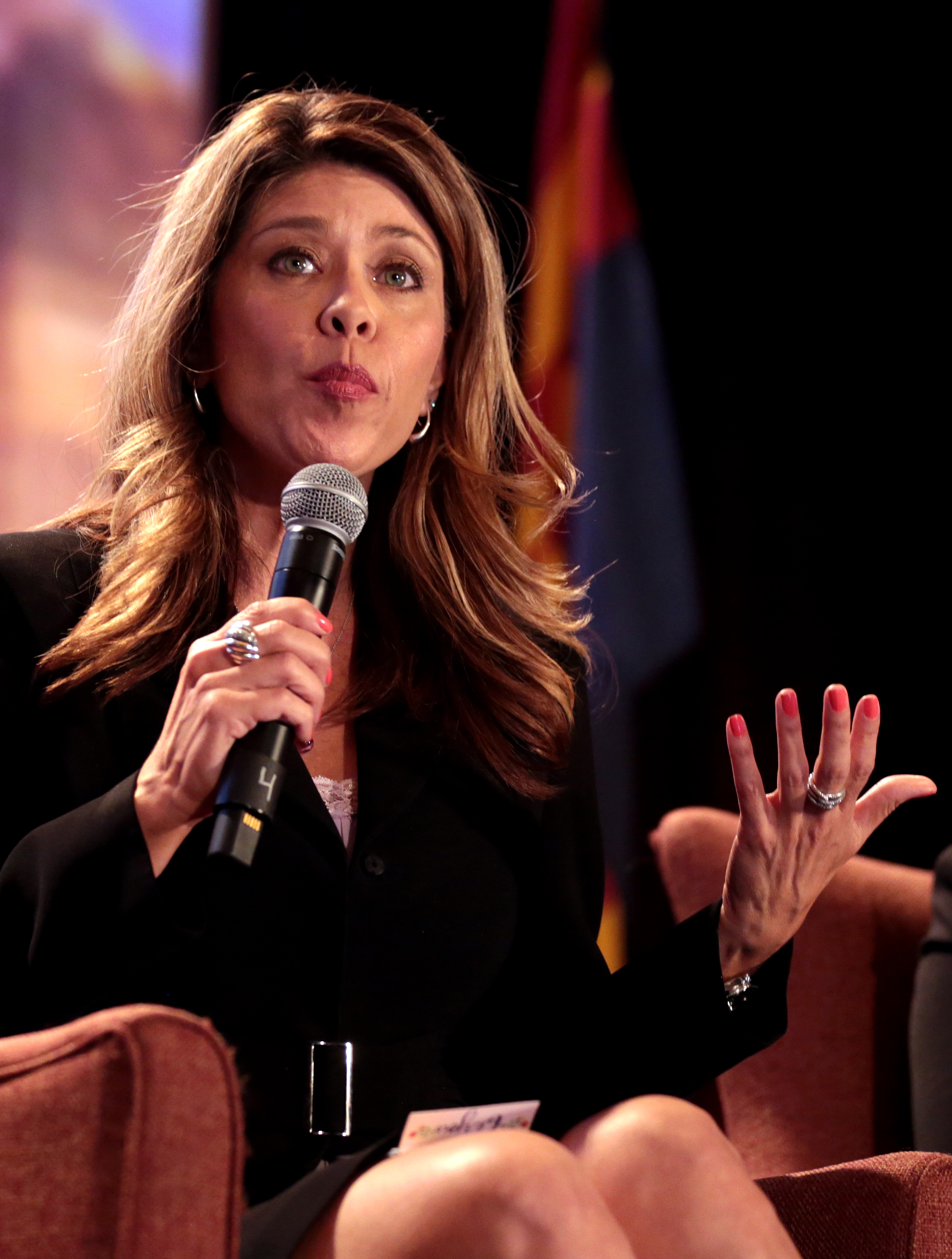
- Rios in 2018

Minority Leader of the Arizona Senate
- In office January 11, 2021 – January 9, 2023
- Preceded by: David Bradley
- Succeeded by: Raquel Terán

Member of the Arizona Senate
- In office January 14, 2019 – January 9, 2023
- Preceded by: Catherine Miranda
- Succeeded by: Anthony Kern
- Constituency: 27th district
- In office January 2005 – January 2011
- Preceded by: Pete Rios
- Succeeded by: Steve Smith
- Constituency: 23rd district

Minority Leader of the Arizona House of Representatives
- In office January 9, 2017 – January 14, 2019
- Preceded by: Eric Meyer
- Succeeded by: Charlene Fernandez

Member of the Arizona House of Representatives from the 27th district
- In office January 5, 2015 – January 14, 2019 Serving with Reginald Bolding
- Preceded by: Norma Muñoz
- Succeeded by: Diego Rodriguez

Personal details
- Born: June 4, 1967 (age 59) Tucson, Arizona, U.S.
- Party: Democratic
- Spouse: Vandon Jenerette
- Relatives: Pete Rios (father)
- Education: Central Arizona College; Arizona State University, Tempe (BA, MSW)

Rebecca Rios (born June 4, 1967) is an American Democratic politician who previously served in the Arizona State Senate representing District 27 from 2019 to 2023. She also served in the Arizona House of Representatives, including as Minority Leader.

== Career ==
Rios was a member of the Arizona House of Representatives representing the 27th district and also served as Minority Leader. She previously served as Arizona State Senator for District 23 from 2004 to 2010, and served as Minority Whip. In 2010, she was defeated in a state senate election by Steve Smith. She was previously a member of the Arizona House of Representatives from 1995 through 2001.

Rios also serves on the Board of Advisors of Let America Vote, an organization founded by former Missouri Secretary of State Jason Kander that aims to end voter suppression. She was elected to the Arizona State Senate in 2018.

== Political views ==
Rios has opposed efforts to add armed and specially trained school personnel to Arizona public schools. She opposes restrictions on abortion rights. Rios has spoken out against an effort led by Louie Gohmert to rename of Cesar Chavez Day to Border Control Day.

Arizona House of Representatives
Preceded by Eric Meyer	Minority Leader of the Arizona House of Representatives; 2017–2019	Succeeded by Charlene Fernandez
Arizona Senate
Preceded by David Bradley	Minority Leader of the Arizona Senate; 2021–2023	Succeeded by Raquel Terán
