= Justin Pierce (politician) =

American politician

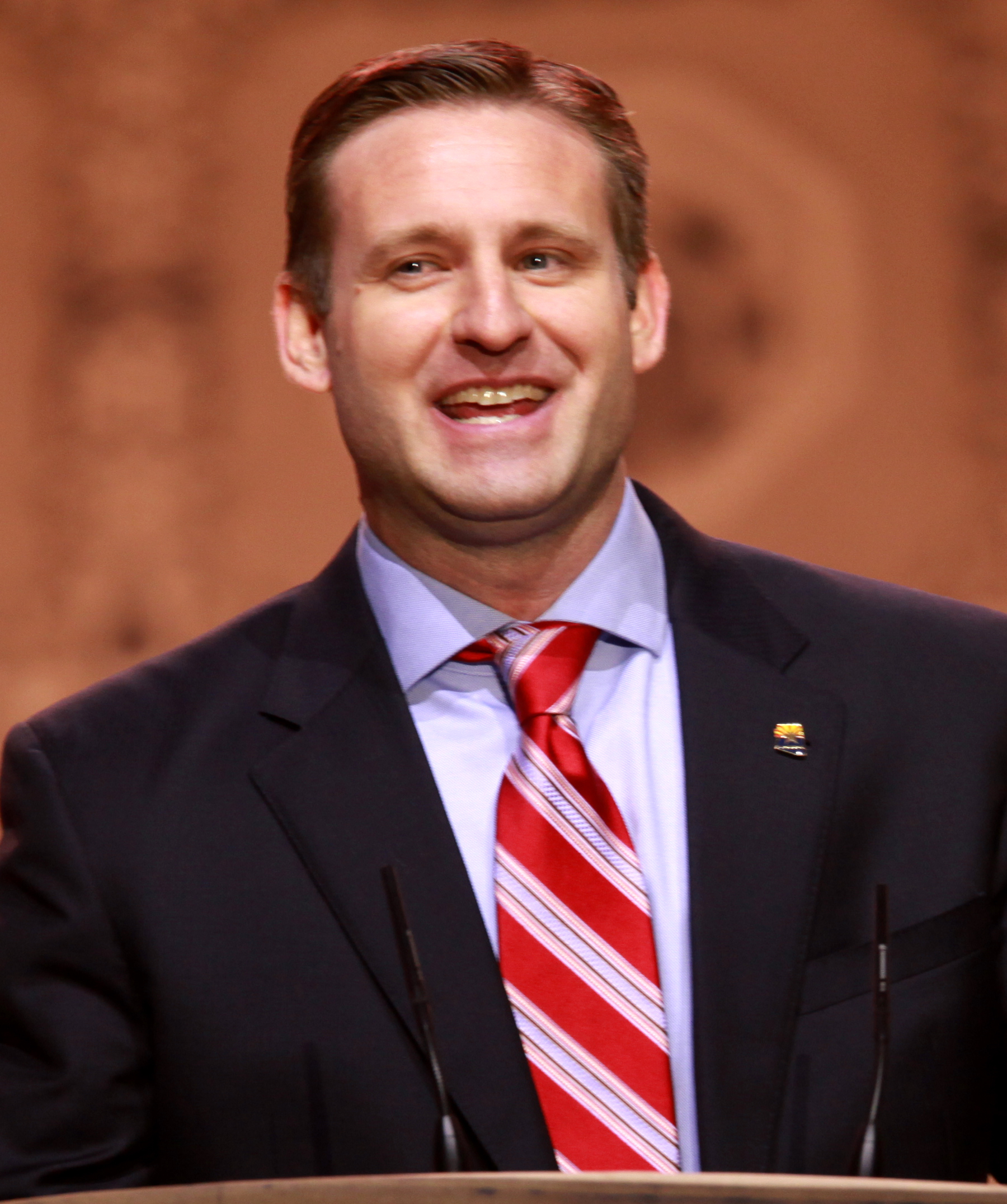
- Pierce in 2014

Member of the Arizona House of Representatives
- In office May 25, 2011 – January 5, 2015 Serving with Justin Olson
- Preceded by: Kirk Adams
- Succeeded by: Russell Bowers
- Constituency: 11th district (2011–2013); 25th district (2013–2015)

Personal details
- Party: Republican
- Education: Arizona State University; Georgetown University Law Center
- Website: justinpierceforarizona.com

Justin Pierce is an American politician and a former Republican member of the Arizona House of Representatives, representing District 25 for one term.

== Education ==
Pierce earned his BS in accountancy from Arizona State University and his JD from Georgetown University Law Center.

== Elections ==
- 2014 Pierce lost in the Republican primary for Arizona Secretary of State to Michele Reagan.
- 2012 With incumbent Republican Representatives Peggy Judd not running, and David Stevens redistricted to District 14, Pierce was one of two candidates for the August 28, 2012 Republican Primary, placing first with 19,868 votes, and won the first seat in the three-way November 6, 2012 General election with 50,017 votes against Democratic nominee David Butler.
