= Reginald Bolding =

American politician

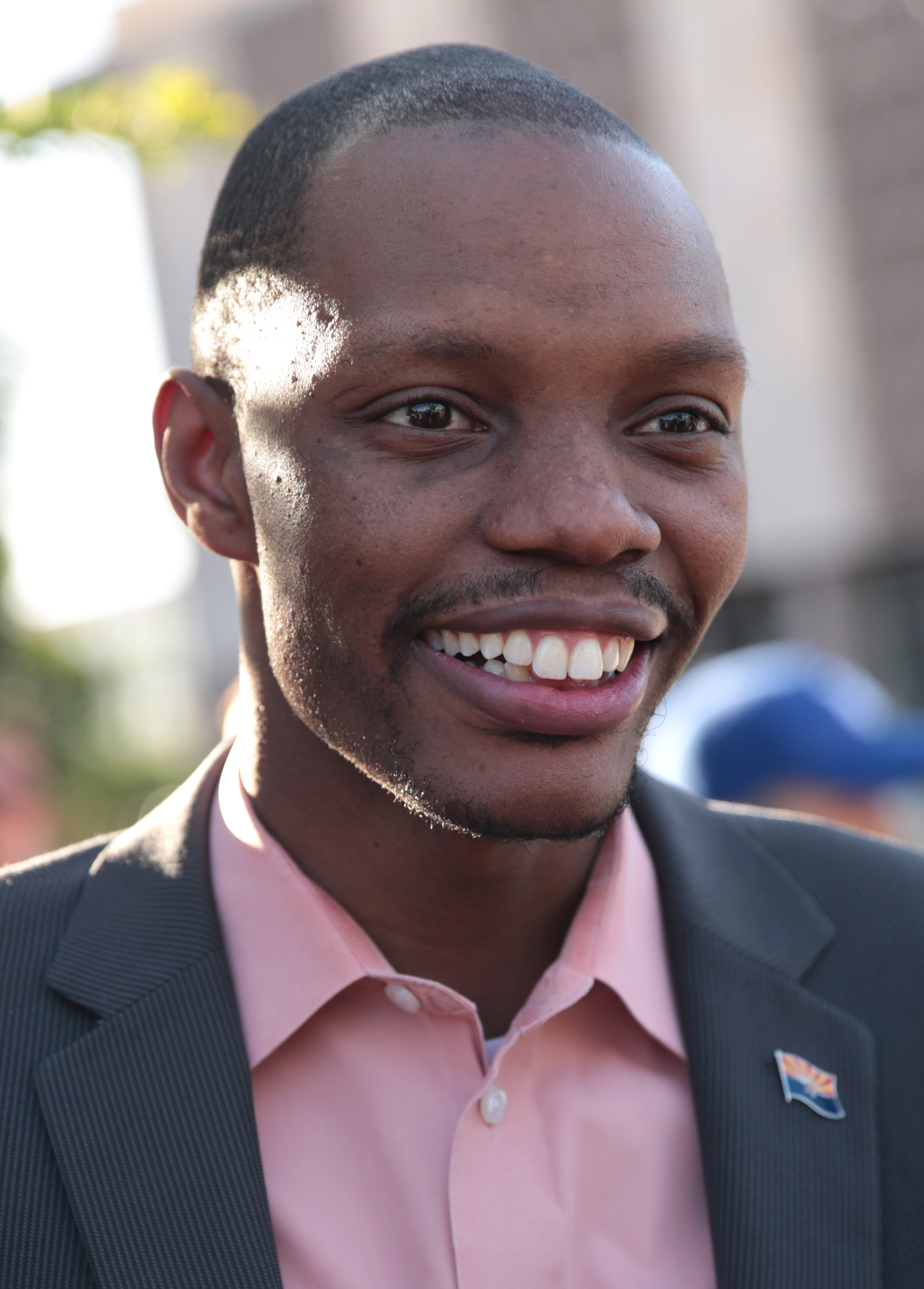
- Bolding in 2017

Minority Leader of the Arizona House of Representatives
- In office January 11, 2021 – January 9, 2023
- Preceded by: Charlene Fernandez
- Succeeded by: Andrés Cano

Member of the Arizona House of Representatives from the 27th district
- In office January 5, 2015 – January 9, 2023 Serving with Marcelino Quiñonez
- Succeeded by: Kevin Payne (redistricting)

Personal details
- Party: Democratic
- Education: University of Cincinnati (BA)
- Website: Official website

Reginald Bolding is a former American politician and Democratic member of the Arizona House of Representatives, representing District 27 from 2015 to 2023.

== Career ==
Bolding graduated from the University of Cincinnati, where he earned an undergraduate degree in Criminal Justice and International Security.

He was named to the Phoenix Business Journal's "40 under 40" list.

He serves as the ranking member of the Arizona House of Representatives Education Committee and also sits on the Ways & Means Committee. Bolding is vice chair of the National Black Caucus of State Legislators (Western Region). He is also the chair of the Arizona Black Legislative Caucus. Bolding is the founder and board chairman of the Arizona Coalition for Change, a community engagement organization focused on increasing civic engagement throughout the state.

Bolding was a candidate for Secretary of State of Arizona in 2022. He lost in the Democratic primary to Adrian Fontes on August 2, 2022.

== Elections ==
- 2014: Bolding defeated incumbent Norma A. Munoz, Marcelino Quinonez, and Edward Blackwell in the Democratic primary. Bolding defeated Myron L. Jackson in the general election, with Bolding receiving 13,950 votes.
- 2016: Bolding was reelected.

Arizona House of Representatives
Preceded by Charlene Fernandez	Minority Leader of the Arizona House of Representatives; 2021–2023	Succeeded by Andrés Cano
