= Jennifer D. Benally =

American politician

Member of the Arizona House of Representatives from the 7th district
- In office January 5, 2015 – January 9, 2017 Serving with Albert Hale
- Preceded by: Jamescita Peshlakai
- Succeeded by: Wenona Benally

Judge of the Kayenta Judicial Court
- In office 1998–2014
- Appointed by: Navajo Nation Council
- Succeeded by: Malcolm P. Begay

Personal details
- Born: Albuquerque, New Mexico
- Party: Democratic
- Education: Northern Arizona University

Jennifer D. Benally is a former state representative from Arizona, representing the 7th district. A member of the Democratic Party, Benally was first elected to the Arizona House of Representatives in 2015. Benally did not seek reelection in 2016.

== Early life and education ==
Benally is Zuni Edgewater Clan born for Tangle Root Clan. Benally was born in Albuquerque, New Mexico but moved to Arizona in 1957. She earned her degree from Northern Arizona University and served as a Navajo Nation police officer from 1982 to 1990. Benally become a Tuba City Prosecutor in 1992. After six years as a prosecutor, Benally became a district court judge for the Navajo Nation.

== Elections ==
In 2014 Benally and Albert Hale defeated Joshua Lavar Butler in the Democratic primary. Hale and Benally were unopposed in the general election.

== Personal life ==
Benally and her husband, Kent, together have 10 children and 14 grandchildren.

== See also ==
- List of Native American jurists
- List of Native American politicians
- Native American women in politics
