= Catherine Miranda =

American politician (born 1964)

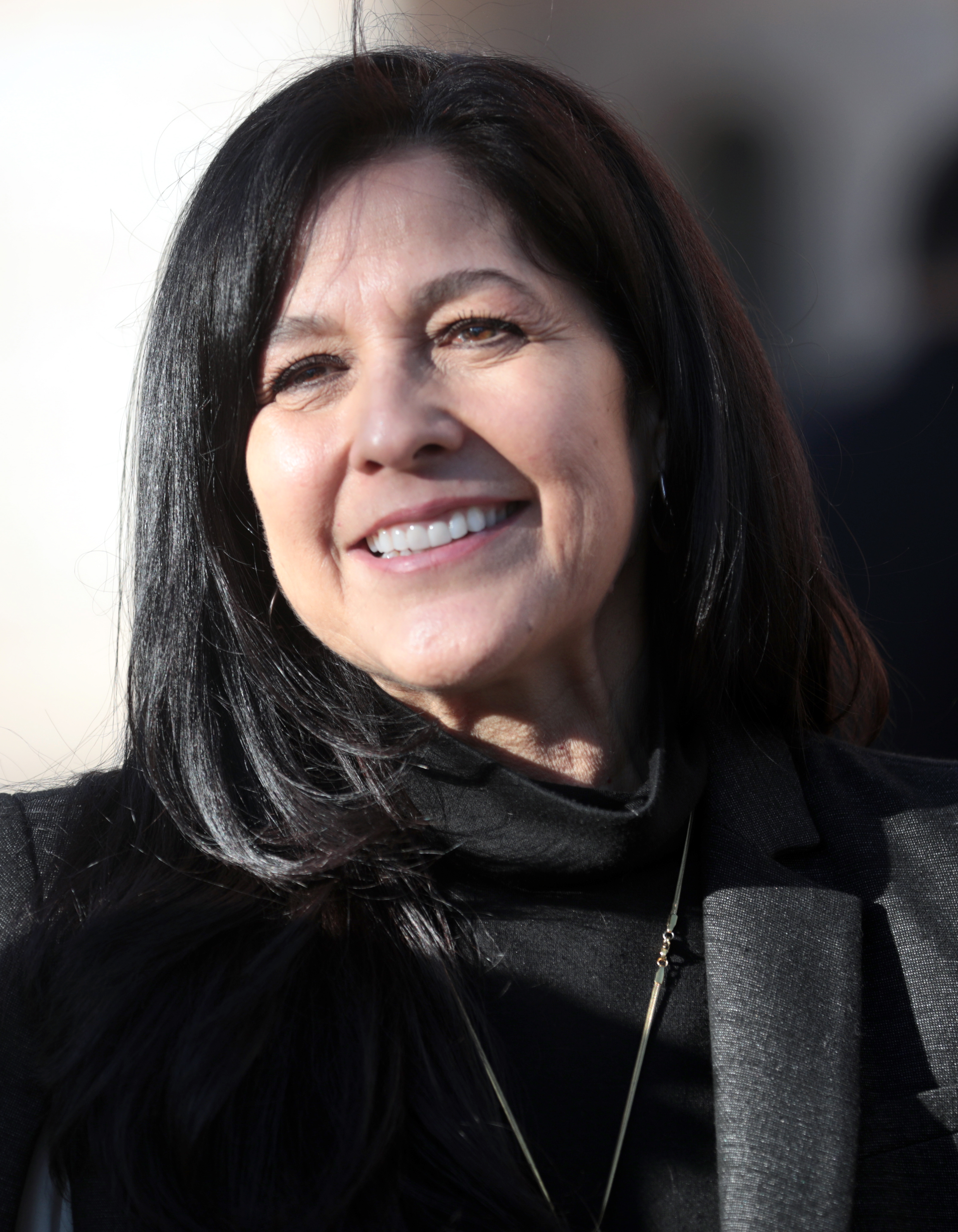
- Miranda in 2023

Member of the Arizona Senate
- Incumbent
- Assumed office January 9, 2023
- Preceded by: Vince Leach
- Constituency: 11th district
- In office January 5, 2015 – January 14, 2019
- Preceded by: Leah Landrum Taylor
- Succeeded by: Rebecca Rios
- Constituency: 27th district

Member of the Arizona House of Representatives
- In office 2011–2015 Serving with Ruben Gallego (2011-2014), Norma Muñoz (2014-2015)
- Constituency: 16th district (2011–2013); 27th district (2013–2015)

Personal details
- Born: October 5, 1964 (age 62) Phoenix, Arizona, U.S.
- Party: Democratic
- Spouses: Roberto Sanchez; Ben Miranda (died 2013)
- Education: Arizona State University; Northern Arizona University
- Occupation: Teacher
- Website: mirandaforarizona.com

Catherine Miranda (born October 5, 1964) is an American politician and member of the Arizona Senate for the 11th legislative district, serving since 2023.

Miranda previously served in the Arizona Senate, representing the 27th electoral district from 2015 to 2019. She was a member of the Arizona House of Representatives from 2011 to 2015. In 2018, Miranda ran in the Democratic primary for Arizona's 7th congressional district in 2018, challenging incumbent Democrat Ruben Gallego, but lost the nomination. In 2020, she was defeated in her attempt to return to the Arizona House of Representatives by challenging the incumbents, Reginald Bolding and Diego Rodriguez, in the Democratic primary.

Miranda was first elected in the 16th district, the same seat that her late husband, Ben Miranda, had held. She was then redistricted to the 27th district. Miranda served on the Roosevelt Elementary School District #66 Governing Board from 2008 until her election to the state House of Representatives and cites education cuts as the reason she ran for a seat in the state legislature.

== Early life ==
Catherine Miranda was born Catherine Hernandez in south Phoenix, Arizona to parents Robert Hernandez and Ysabel Santana Hernandez. She lived in Arizona her entire life, attending Middle school at Lassen and High School at East High. When she went off to college, she attended Arizona State University to obtain her bachelor's degree and then she attended Northern Arizona University where she obtained her master's degree. She worked as teacher in Roosevelt Elementary School District in Arizona and went on to be a School Administrator in the Roosevelt/Cartwright/Washington districts. After that she served as a Governing Board member in the Roosevelt Elementary School District before moving into politics.

== Awards ==
- John S. Martinez Award: Awarded by National Hispanic Caucus of State Legislators and recognizes a Hispanic legislature who has shown strong leadership and made a significant impact.
- Valle Del Sol Leadership Award: Recognizes Leadership in Arizona, especially those who go out of their way for strong legislative work
- Champion of Education Award: Received in 2017
- Friend of Arizona's Cities and Towns Recognition: Awarded by League of Arizona Cities and Towns
- Recognition from the Governor of El Salvador: Awarded for her leadership in preserving Temporary Protected Status
- Golden Apple Award: Awarded by Arizona Parents for Education

== Elections ==
- 2020 Miranda was defeated in her attempt to unseat incumbent representatives Reginald Bolding and Diego Rodriguez in the Democratic primary for Arizona House of Representatives Legislative District 27, receiving 23.4% of the vote.
- 2018 Miranda lost to Ruben Gallego in the Democratic primary for the US House of Representatives Arizona 7th District. Ruben Gallego defeated Miranda with 74.8% of the vote.
- 2016 Miranda won in a challenge by her step daughter, Maritza Saenz, in the Democratic primary. Catherine Miranda won with 56 percent of the vote. She later went on to win the general election with 81% of the vote.
- 2014 Miranda ran for the Arizona Senate Legislative District 27 seat vacated by incumbent Leah Landrum Taylor who could not run again due to term limits. In the Democratic primary, she defeated Aaron Marquez with 54.5% of the vote. Miranda went on to defeat Natalie Taswell in the general election with 74.3% of the vote.
- 2012 Miranda won re-election in the 2012 election for Arizona House of Representatives Legislative District 27. She and incumbent Ruben Gallego defeated Reginald Bolding in the Democratic primary.
- 2010 Miranda ran for the seat vacated by her husband who ran for Constable for South Mountain (Phoenix). She faced Cloves Campbell Jr. (incumbent), Ruben Gallego, Sandra Gonzales, Cristy Lopez and Jim Munoz in the primary. Miranda and Gallego advanced with 21.9% and 26.1% of the votes, respectively. They then defeated Republican Michael Gular and Green Angel Torres in the general election.
- 2008 Miranda was elected to the Roosevelt Elementary School District #66 Governing Board in a crowded field of 7 candidates. She served 2 years of her 4-year term before being elected to the Arizona House of Representatives in 2010.

== Electoral history ==
Arizona House of Representatives 27th District Democratic Primary Election, 2020
Party	Candidate	Votes	%
Democratic	Reginald Bolding (inc.)	14,064	41.21
Democratic	Diego Rodriguez (inc.)	12,064	35.35
Democratic	Catherine Miranda	7,999	23.44

U.S. House of Representatives - Arizona 7th District Democratic Primary Election, 2018
Party	Candidate	Votes	%
Democratic	Ruben Gallego (inc.)	32,231	74.80
Democratic	Catherine Miranda	10,856	25.20

Arizona Senate 27th District General Election, 2016
Party	Candidate	Votes	%
Democratic	Catherine Miranda (inc.)	40,085	81.04
Green	Angel Torres	9,381	18.96

Arizona Senate 27th District Democratic Primary Election, 2016
Party	Candidate	Votes	%
Democratic	Catherine Miranda (inc.)	6,049	56.04
Democratic	Maritza Saenz	4,746	43.96

Arizona Senate 27th District General Election, 2014
Party	Candidate	Votes	%
Democratic	Catherine Miranda	17,917	74.3
Republican	Natalie Taswell	6,198	25.7

Arizona Senate 27th District Primary Election, 2014
Party	Candidate	Votes	%
Democratic	Catherine Miranda	5,672	54.51
Democratic	Aaron Marquez	4,733	45.49

Arizona House of Representatives 27th District Election, 2012
Party	Candidate	Votes	%
Democratic	Catherine Miranda (inc.)	28,683	40.98
Democratic	Ruben Gallego (inc.)	27,522	39.32
Republican	Daniel Coleman	10,088	14.41
Green	Angel Torres	3,702	5.29

Arizona House of Representatives 27th District Democratic Primary Election, 2012
Party	Candidate	Votes	%
Democratic	Ruben Gallego (inc.)	4,996	56.71
Democratic	Catherine Miranda (inc.)	4,800	54.48
Democratic	Reginald Bolding	3,334	37.84

Arizona House of Representatives 16th District Election, 2010
Party	Candidate	Votes	%
Democratic	Catherine Miranda	19,197	39.46
Democratic	Ruben Gallego	18,365	37.75
Republican	Michael Gular	8,551	17.58
Green	Angel Torres	2,532	5.21

Arizona House of Representatives 16th District Democratic Primary Election, 2010
Party	Candidate	Votes	%
Democratic	Ruben Gallego	4,149	26.12
Democratic	Catherine Miranda	3,476	21.88
Democratic	Cloves Campbell	3,182	20.03
Democratic	Jim Munoz Jr.	2,281	14.36
Democratic	Sandra Gonzales	1,955	12.31
Democratic	Cristy Lopez	842	5.30

Roosevelt Elementary School District #66 Governing Board, 2008
Candidate	Votes	%
Catherine Miranda	7,432	18.24
Norma Munoz (inc.)	7,103	17.43
Betta A. Doss Ware (inc.)	6,863	16.84
Jose H. Ochoa	6,041	14.82
Helen R. Hill	6,032	14.80
Dorothy J. Glueck	3,832	9.40
Joseph Larios	3,271	8.03

== Political positions ==
One of Catherine Miranda's top priorities is on education in Arizona. She supports state governments providing college students with financial aid and allowing immigrants who graduate from Arizona high schools to be eligible for in-state tuition at public universities. She also believes that there needs to be an increase in government spending for K-12 education and a slight increase in spending for post-secondary education. Miranda voted against expanding school vouchers in Arizona.

Miranda supports the Deferred Action for Childhood Arrivals or DACA as well as a pathway to citizenship for some undocumented immigrants known as Dreamers. She also believes that the issue of border security needs to framed in terms economic impact.

In her time in the Arizona Legislature, Miranda has crossed party lines to vote with Republicans on several occasions. During the primary election for the US House of Representatives for the Arizona 7th District, incumbent Rep. Ruben Gallego accused her of being a Republican stating "there is a Republican running - it's Catherine Miranda". She also made headlines when she endorsed Republican Doug Ducey for Governor in 2014, despite previously endorsing the Democratic candidate, Fred DuVal. Additionally, she endorsed Republican Michele Reagan for Arizona secretary of state over the Democratic contender, Terry Goddard.

On fiscal issues, she opposes deregulation of the private sector and supports expanding unemployment benefits. In 2016, the fiscally conservative Americans for Prosperity gave her a rating of 30% and the fiscally conservative Goldwater Institute gave her a 39% score in 2013.

Miranda supports enhancing background checks and regulations when it comes to gun ownership. She does not support arming teachers and instead focused on the problem of third party arms dealers.

Catherine Miranda described herself as pro-life in 2010 and is against abortion due to her religious beliefs, being classified as "anti-choice" by NARAL Pro-Choice Arizona. She was endorsed by Arizona Right to Life in her 2016 election. She is one of a few pro-life Democrats and she sometimes crosses the aisle to vote with Republicans regarding abortion. In 2018, she was the only Democrat to break with her party and vote with Republicans to increase reporting requirements for abortion providers as well as to allow stored embryos to be used by one partner even after a divorce. She also voted to ban abortions after 20 weeks of pregnancy. However, she voted against allowing employers to refuse to provide birth control and contraception health care coverage to employees.

In 2014, Planned Parenthood, which supports legal access to abortion, gave Miranda a rating of 67% for voting in line with their positions and she received a 40% rating in 2016; conversely, the Center for Arizona Policy, which opposes legal abortion, gave Miranda a 2017 score of 20% and a 2016 score of 50% based on their positions.

In 2010, Miranda responded to a questionnaire answering that she is opposed to same-sex marriage, but also responded that she supports civil unions. She also answered questions saying that she supports non-discrimination protections for LGBT persons including by adding gender identity and sexual orientation to Arizona's anti-discrimination laws. Stonewall Democrats of Arizona, a partisan Democratic group in support of same-sex marriage and other gay rights, gave Miranda a rating of 50% in 2014

== Family ==
Miranda's husband, Roberto Sanchez, ran for a state House seat in the 27th legislative district in 2018. She has two children and was formerly married to Ben Miranda who died in 2013. Miranda's nephew, Cipriano-Gabriel Miranda, ran for Miranda's open state Senate seat in 2018. Miranda's brother-in-law, Richard Miranda, was elected to the state house in 1998 and served until 2012.

=== Parents ===
Her father, Robert Hernandez was a Korean War Veteran and worked in construction. While working in construction he helped to build what is now known as the KROC center. Her mother, Ysabel Hernandez worked at AirResearch, and Aerospace technology company. She died from breast cancer when Catherine Miranda was only 17 years old.
