= Jay Lawrence (politician) =

American talk show host and politician

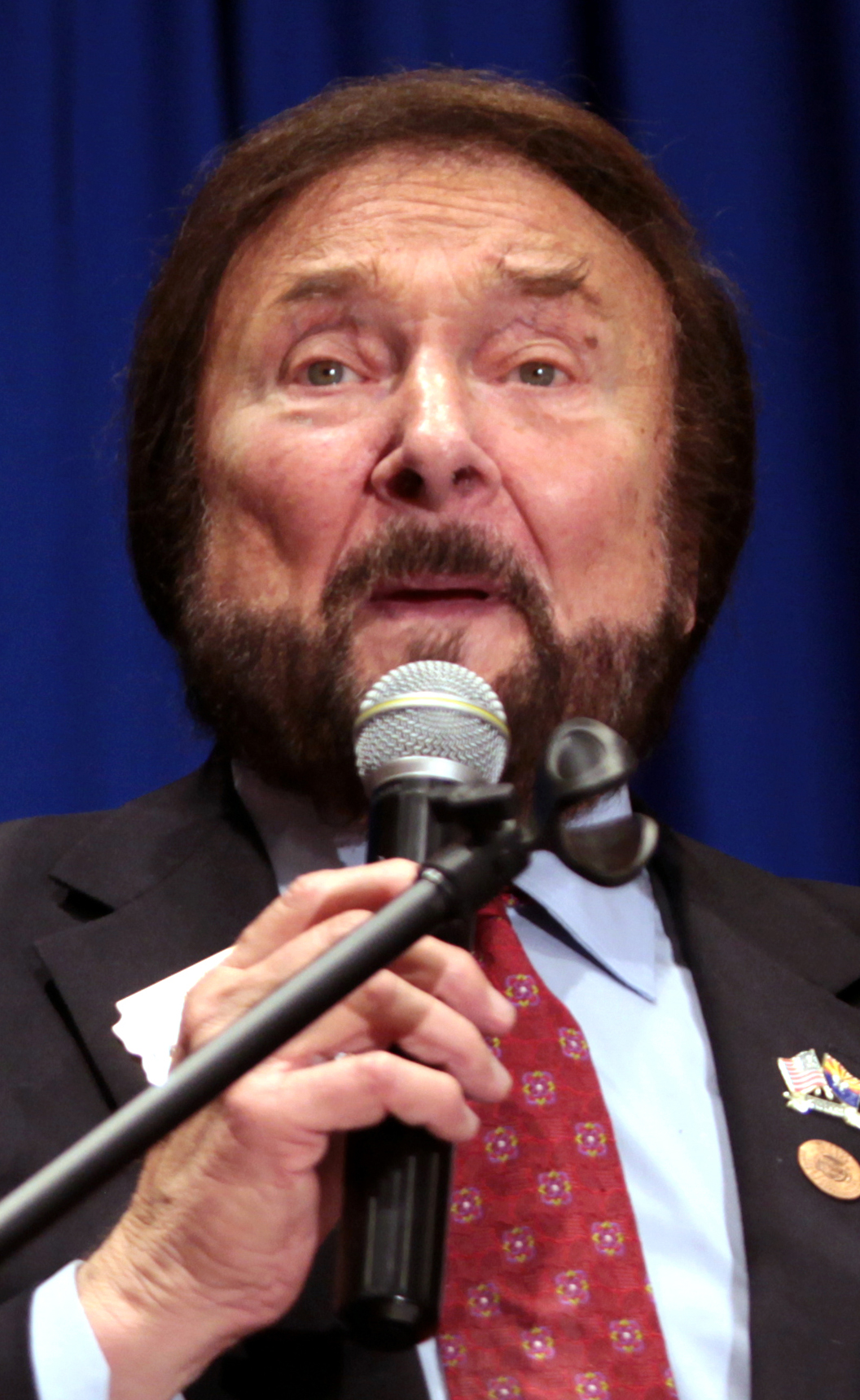

Member of the Arizona House of Representatives from the 23rd district
- In office January 5, 2015 – January 11, 2021 Serving with John Kavanagh
- Preceded by: John Kavanagh
- Succeeded by: Joseph Chaplik

Personal details
- Born: Chicago, Illinois, US
- Party: Republican
- Education: Arizona State University
- Profession: Talk show host
- Website: ld23jaylawrence.com

Jay Lawrence is an American politician and a former Republican member of the Arizona House of Representatives who represented District 23 from January 2015 to January 2021. Lawrence was a talk show host at KTAR radio for 26 years.

== Elections ==
- 2016 Lawrence and Michelle Ugenti were unopposed in the Republican primary. They defeated Democrat Tammy Caputi on November 8. Lawrence was the second vote getter in the election with 64,903 votes.
- 2014 Lawrence and Michelle Ugenti defeated Effie Carlson and Bob Littlefield in the Republican primary and were unchallenged in the general election.
