= Norma Muñoz =

American politician

Member of the Arizona House of Representatives from the 27th district
- In office March 24, 2014 – January 5, 2015.
- Preceded by: Ruben Gallego
- Succeeded by: Rebecca Rios

Personal details
- Party: Democrat

Norma Muñoz is an American politician who served as a representative in the Arizona House of Representatives from 2014 to 2015. She was appointed unanimously by the Maricopa County Board of Supervisors on March 24, 2014, to fill the seat that was created when Ruben Gallego resigned to run for Congress. She lost the bid for reelection during the Democratic primary to Rebecca Rios.
