= Richard Andrade =

American politician

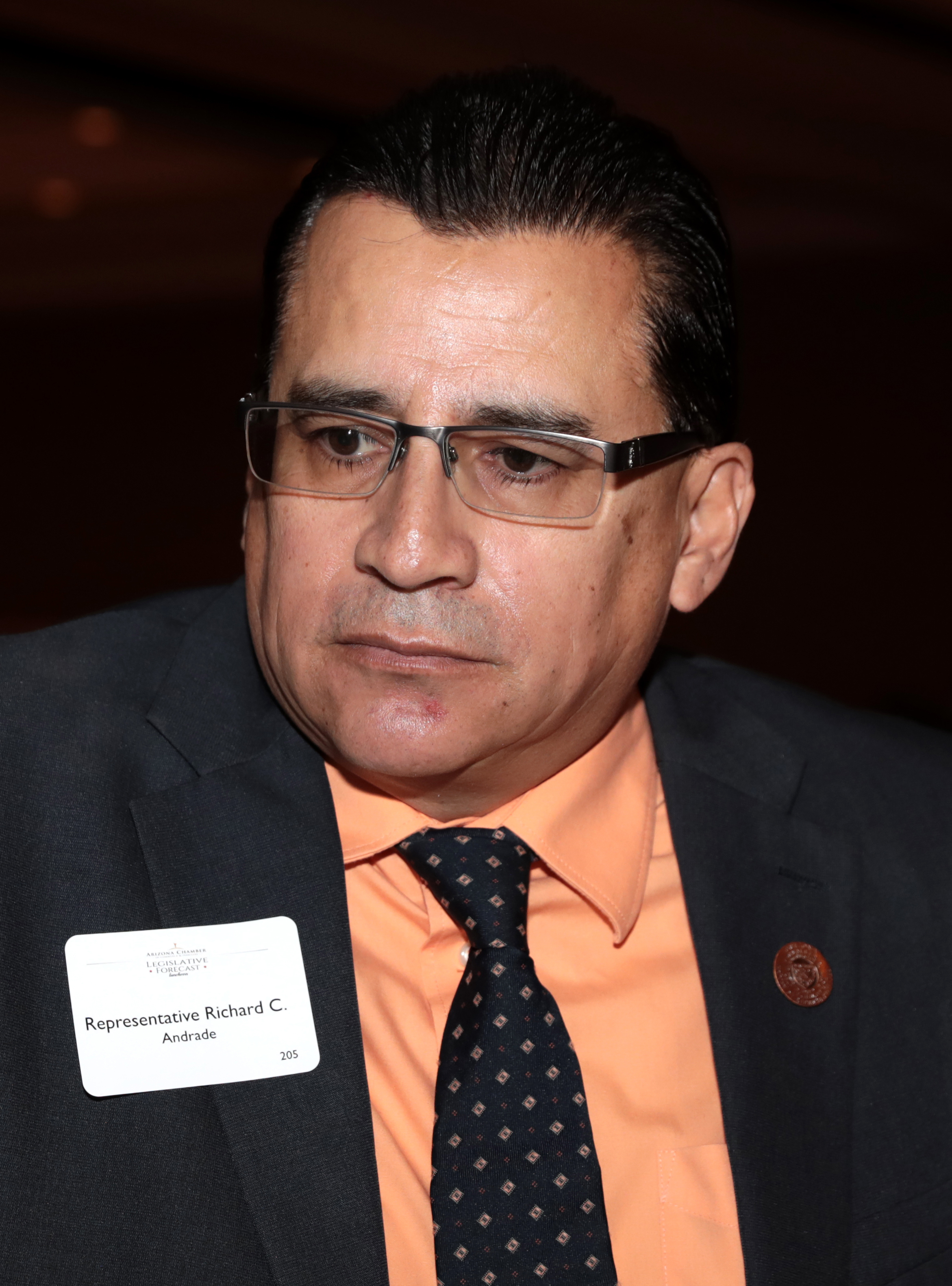
- Andrade in 2019

Member of the Arizona House of Representatives from the 29th district
- In office January 5, 2015 – January 9, 2023 Serving with Cesar Chavez
- Succeeded by: Steve Montenegro

Personal details
- Born: Richard C. Andrade Winslow, Arizona
- Party: Democratic
- Profession: Certified Locomotive Engineer
- Website: richandrade.com

Richard C. Andrade is an American politician and a former Democratic member of the Arizona House of Representatives representing District 29 from 2015 to 2023. He served in the U.S. Air Force from 1983 to 1990.

== Elections ==
- 2014 Andrade and Ceci Velasquez defeated Steve Chapman and Denise Garcia in the Democratic primary. Andrade and Velasquez defeated Republican Borders in the general election.
