= Albert Hale =

American politician (1950–2021)

Member of the Arizona House of Representatives from the 7th district
- In office January 15, 2013 – January 9, 2017 Serving with Jennifer D. Benally
- Preceded by: Redistricted
- Succeeded by: Eric Descheenie

Member of the Arizona House of Representatives from the 2nd district
- In office January 10, 2011 – January 15, 2013 Serving with Tom Chabin
- Preceded by: Christopher Deschene
- Succeeded by: Rosanna Gabaldón

Member of the Arizona Senate from the 2nd district
- In office January 12, 2004 – January 10, 2011
- Preceded by: Jack Jackson Sr.
- Succeeded by: Jack Jackson Jr.

2nd President of the Navajo Nation
- In office January 10, 1995 – February 19, 1998
- Vice President: Thomas Atcitty
- Preceded by: Peterson Zah
- Succeeded by: Thomas Atcitty

Personal details
- Born: March 13, 1950 Ganado, Arizona, U.S.
- Died: February 2, 2021 (aged 70) Mesa, Arizona, U.S.
- Party: Democratic
- Education: Arizona State University, Tempe (BS); University of New Mexico (JD)

Albert A. Hale (March 13, 1950 – February 2, 2021) was an American attorney and politician. A member of the Democratic Party, he served in the Arizona Senate from 2004 to 2011 and in the Arizona House of Representatives from 2011 to 2017.

A member of the Navajo Nation, Hale was elected as the tribe's president in 1994. He served until 1998, when he resigned to avoid facing prosecution for 50 felonies and misdemeanors related to theft and bribery. He was widely recognized as a staunch advocate for tribal rights and a key figure in upholding tribal sovereignty.

== Early life and education ==
Albert A. Hale was born on March 13, 1950, in Ganado, Arizona, to Willie, who worked at the Fort Wingate U.S. Army depot, and Irene, who herded sheep. He was raised in Klagetsoh, and was of the Áshįįhí clan. Hale's maternal grandparents were Hónágháahnii and his paternal grandparents were Kinya’áanii. His family lived at the depot when he was born. Willie was beaten to death in a jail in Gallup, New Mexico, by a police officer when Albert was two years old. The officer did not face any repercussions. According to Hale's daughter April, his father's killing is the event that inspired him to enter politics.

He attended Wingate High School, and frequently told a story of Navajo Nation Council member Annie Dodge Wauneka shaming him into going to school after he was caught being truant.

Hale earned a Bachelor of Science degree from Arizona State University and a Juris Doctor from the University of New Mexico School of Law.

== Career ==
=== Legal work ===
Hale began his legal career in private practice. He served as a judge pro tempore in the Laguna Pueblo, and later served as both assistant attorney general of and special counsel to the Navajo Nation Council. He served as the president of both the Navajo Nation Bar Association and the State Bar of New Mexico.

=== Politics ===
Hale was elected the second Navajo Nation President in late 1994, running on a campaign of local empowerment. His intention was to move more powers to the local 110 chapters of government in the Nation. A leader with a national reputation, Hale had become known for his promotion of tribal sovereignty. Ron Allen, president of the National Congress of American Indians, said that he worked to "explain to Congress and the President and the rest of the world that we are Indian governments, not just tribes." The New York Times described him as "one of the most forceful advocates for the rights of tribes as nations within a nation." In February 1998, Speaker of the U.S. House of Representatives Newt Gingrich told a group of Indian leaders, including Hale, that he was confused by tribal sovereignty, to which Hale reportedly responded, "When I come to Washington, you don't send me to the Bureau of Indian Affairs. You have a state dinner for me."

In 1997, The Navajo Times published articles reporting "alleged misuse of a tribal credit card" and elements of his personal life. The Navajo attorney general appointed a special prosecutor, who investigated for five months Hale's spending in 1995 and 1996. He was indicted in 1997 for accepting kickbacks and bribes, and for misuse of government property. The High Country Times also reported that he had an extramarital affair. He was allowed to resign his post on February 19, 1998, to avoid criminal prosecution on 50 counts.

Hale re-entered electoral politics in January 2004, when Governor Janet Napolitano appointed him to fill the Arizona Senate seat from the 2nd district vacated by Jack Jackson Sr.

In 2011, after being restricted from running in the Senate again by term limits, he was elected to the Arizona House of Representatives. There, he advocated for tribal nations to receive more tax revenue from the transaction privilege tax and for compensation for uranium mining on Navajo land.

Hale also served as chairman of the Navajo Nation Water Rights Commission, where he played an important role in negotiating a settlement with the New Mexico government over the San Juan Basin, which resulted in more water for many Navajo communities.

== Personal life and death ==
Hale was married three times, with the first two ending in divorce. Hale was known by many in the Navajo community as "Abhihay". According to Jack Jackson Jr., Hale commanded respect, and was known for wearing a Navajo warrior hat known as an atsá cha’h at important events.

On November 22, 2014, Hale was arrested on suspicion of driving under the influence by the Arizona Department of Public Safety. He was booked into the Navajo County jail in Holbrook, Arizona, and released the same day.

On January 11, 2021, Hale was hospitalized in Mesa, Arizona, after testing positive for COVID-19 four days earlier. He died from complications related to the virus on February 2, 2021, at age 70. He is survived by nine children and his wife, Paula.

After his death, Navajo Nation Council Speaker Seth Damon recognized Hale on behalf of the council, saying "he is remembered for his service and dedication to the Navajo people, which continued beyond the borders of the Nation when he was called to represent our district in the Arizona Legislature. We recognize his positive contributions to the development of numerous initiatives that have advanced the causes of Navajo people both at home and abroad." President of the Navajo Nation Jonathan Nez and Governor of Arizona Doug Ducey both ordered flags to be flown at half-staff in honor of him.

Political offices
Preceded by Peterson Zah	President of the Navajo Nation; 1995–1998	Succeeded by Thomas Atcitty
