= 2022 Arizona Secretary of State election =

- November 8, 2022
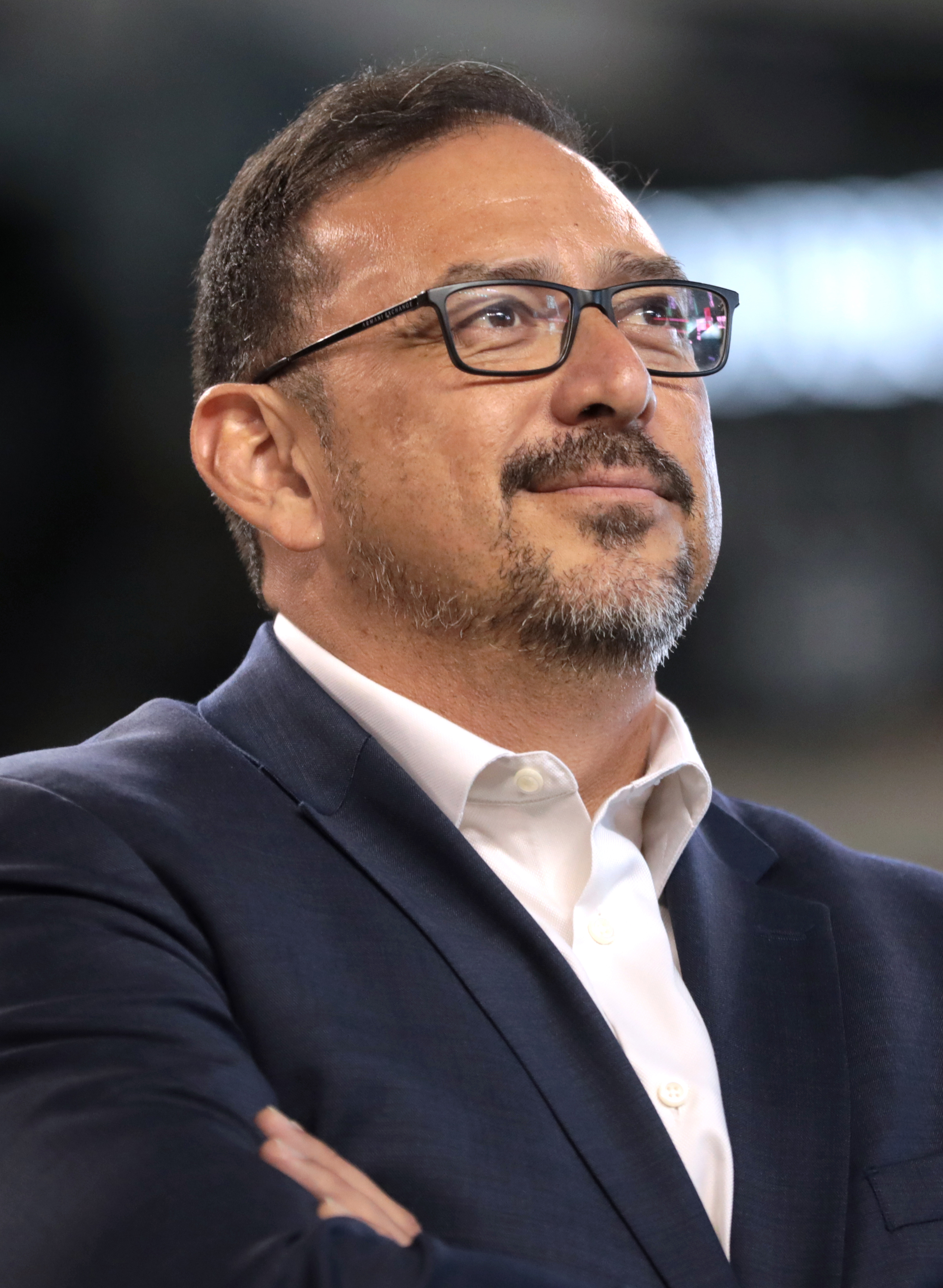

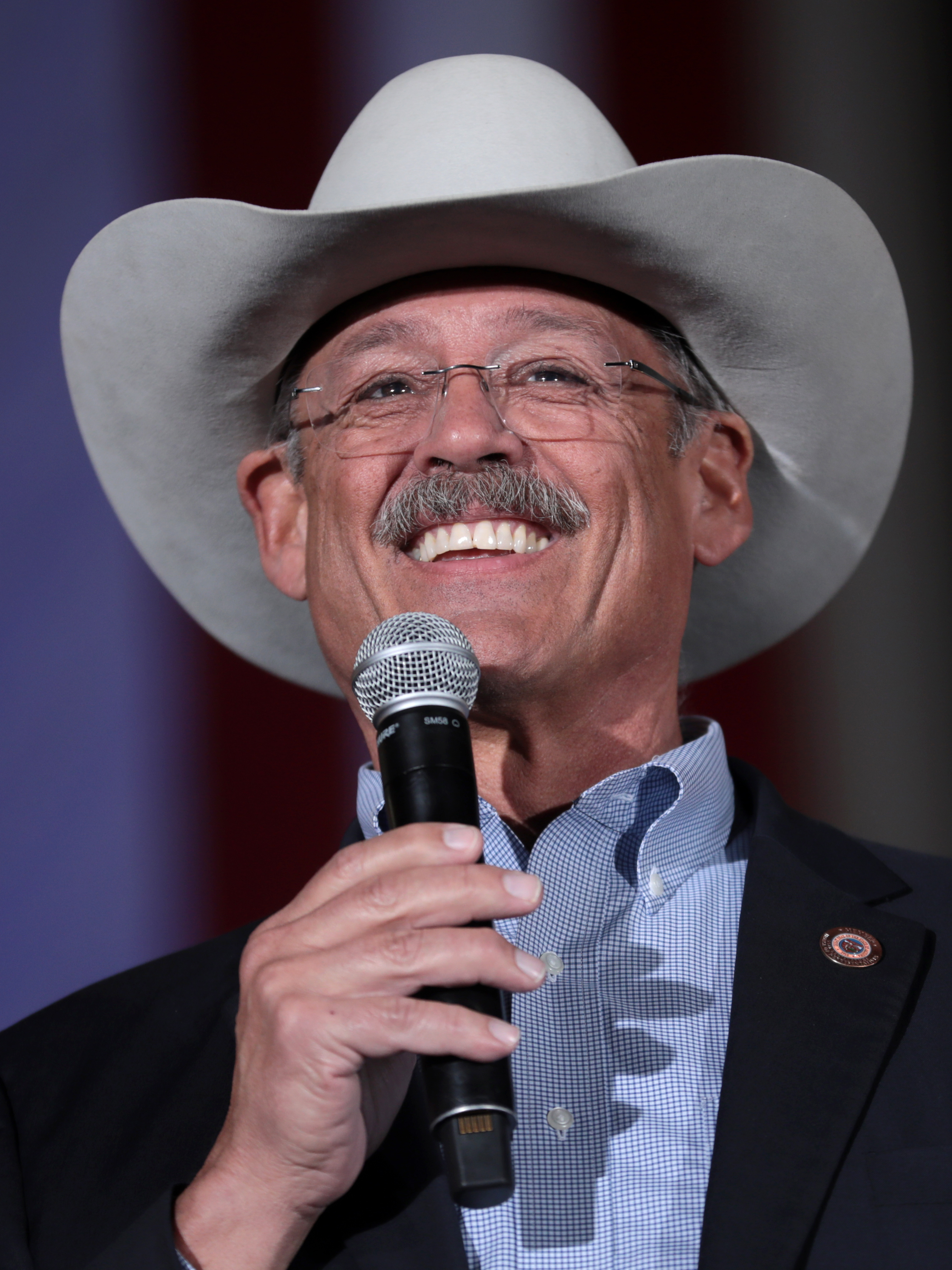
Nominee	Adrian Fontes	Mark Finchem
Party	Democratic	Republican
Popular vote	1,320,619	1,200,411
Percentage	52.38%	47.62%
- Fontes: 40–50% 50–60% 60–70% 70–80% 80–90% >90% Finchem: 50–60% 60–70% 70–80% 80–90% >90% Tie: 50% No votes
Secretary of State before election
Katie Hobbs
Democratic
Elected Secretary of State
Adrian Fontes
Democratic

The 2022 Arizona Secretary of State election was held on Tuesday, November 8, to elect the next Secretary of State of Arizona. Incumbent Secretary of State Katie Hobbs declined to run for a second term, to instead run for governor. Primary elections were held on August 2, 2022. Democrat and former Maricopa County recorder Adrian Fontes defeated Republican representative Mark Finchem by 4.8%.

Finchem was backed by the America First Secretary of State Coalition, a Republican group supporting Secretary of State candidates who championed the far-right conspiracy theory that falsely claimed that Donald Trump won the 2020 United States presidential election. Due to a combination of Arizona's role as a swing state in the previous presidential election, Finchem's views, and the role of the Secretary of State in certifying elections, the race took upon an uncharacteristically high national profile.

== Democratic primary ==
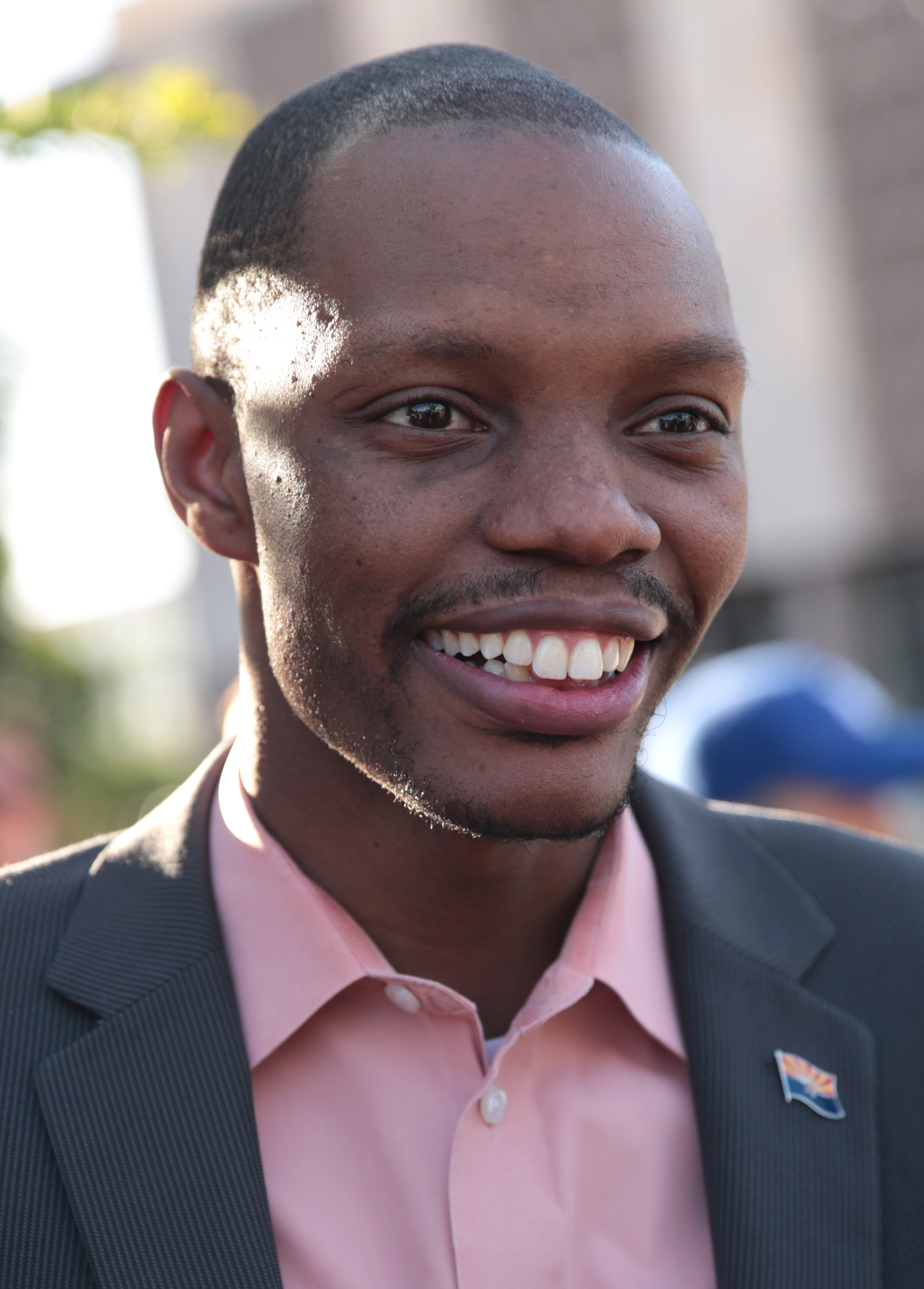
State house minority leader Reginald Bolding finished second in the primary.

=== Candidates ===
==== Nominee ====
- Adrian Fontes, former Maricopa County Recorder (2017–2020) and U.S. Marine Corps veteran

==== Eliminated in primary ====
- Reginald Bolding, minority leader of the Arizona House of Representatives

==== Declined ====
- Katie Hobbs, incumbent Secretary of State (ran for Governor)

=== Debate ===
2022 Arizona Secretary of State Democratic primary debate
No.	Date	Host	Moderator	Link	Democratic	Democratic
Key: P Participant A Absent N Not invited I Invited W Withdrawn						
Key: P Participant A Absent N Not invited I Invited W Withdrawn					Reginald Bolding	Adrian Fontes
1	Apr. 25, 2022	KAET	Ted Simons	YouTube	P	P

=== Polling ===
Poll source	Date(s) administered	Sample size (Note: Key: A – all adults RV – registered voters LV – likely voters V – unclear)	Margin of error	Reginald Bolding	Adrian Fontes	Undecided
Lake Research Partners (D) (Note: This poll was sponsored by Our Vote Our Voice, which supports Bolding)	July 24–26, 2022	600 (LV)	± 4.0%	35%	30%	28%
OH Predictive Insights (D) (Note: This poll was sponsored by an unknown PAC)	July 2022	537 (RV)	± 4.4%	29%	44%	27%
Lake Research Partners (D)	July 2022	– (LV)	–	29%	35%	36%
Public Policy Polling (D) (Note: This poll was sponsored by an unknown client)	July 8–9, 2022	740 (LV)	± 3.6%	18%	32%	51%
Lake Research Partners (D)	May 2022	– (LV)	–	14%	35%	51%
OH Predictive Insights	September 7–12, 2021	283 (RV)	± 5.8%	22%	17%	61%

=== Results ===
Democratic primary results by county Fontes: 50–60%; 60–70%; 70–80%; Bolding: 50–60%

Democratic primary results
Party	Candidate	Votes	%
Democratic	Adrian Fontes	302,681	52.50%
Democratic	Reginald Bolding	273,815	47.50%
Total votes		576,496	100.0%

== Republican primary ==
=== Candidates ===
==== Nominee ====
- Mark Finchem, state representative for Arizona's 11th legislative district

==== Eliminated in primary ====
- Shawnna Bolick, state representative for Arizona's 20th legislative district
- Beau Lane, advertising executive
- Michelle Ugenti-Rita, state senator for Arizona's 23rd legislative district

=== Endorsements ===
Mark Finchem

U.S. Executive Branch officials

- Donald Trump, 45th President of the United States (2017–2021)

Organizations

- America First Secretary of State Coalition
Beau Lane

Statewide officials

- Jan Brewer, former Governor of Arizona (2009–2015) and former Secretary of State of Arizona (2003–2009)
- Doug Ducey, Governor of Arizona (2015–present) and former State Treasurer of Arizona (2011–2015)
- Fife Symington, former Governor of Arizona (1990–1997)

Publications

- Casa Grande Dispatch

=== Debate ===
2022 Arizona Secretary of State Republican primary debate
No.	Date	Host	Moderator	Link	Republican	Republican	Republican	Republican
Key: P Participant A Absent N Not invited I Invited W Withdrawn								
Key: P Participant A Absent N Not invited I Invited W Withdrawn					Shawnna Bolick	Mark Finchem	Beau Lane	Michelle Ugenti-Rita
1	Jun. 25, 2022	KAET	Ted Simons	YouTube	P	A	P	P

=== Polling ===
Poll source	Date(s) administered	Sample size	Margin of error	Shawnna Bolick	Mark Finchem	Beau Lane	Michelle Ugenti-Rita	Other	Undecided
Rasmussen Reports	July 27–28, 2022	710 (LV)	± 4.0%	11%	27%	16%	12%	10%	25%
OH Predictive Insights	July 27, 2022	502 (LV)	± 4.4%	8%	32%	11%	9%	–	41%
OH Predictive Insights	June 30 – July 2, 2022	515 (LV)	± 4.3%	3%	14%	5%	6%	–	72%
OH Predictive Insights	April 4–5, 2022	500 (LV)	± 4.4%	3%	13%	2%	9%	–	74%
OH Predictive Insights	September 7–12, 2021	311 (RV)	± 5.6%	8%	11%	–	7%	–	74%

Hypothetical polling

Poll source	Date(s) administered	Sample size	Margin of error	Mark Finchem	Kelly Townsend	Michelle Ugenti-Rita	Other	Undecided
HighGround Public Affairs (R)	May 3–5, 2021	400 (LV)	± 4.9%	5%	12%	4%	8% (Note: "Other" with 4%; Beau Lane with 0%)	75%

=== Results ===
Republican primary results by county Finchem: 30–40%; 40–50%; 50–60%

Republican primary results
Party	Candidate	Votes	%
Republican	Mark Finchem	329,884	42.56%
Republican	Beau Lane	181,058	23.36%
Republican	Shawnna Bolick	149,779	19.32%
Republican	Michelle Ugenti-Rita	114,391	14.76%
Total votes		775,101	100.0%

== General election ==
=== Debate ===
2022 Arizona Secretary of State debate
No.	Date	Host	Moderator	Link	Democratic	Republican
Key: P Participant A Absent N Not invited I Invited W Withdrawn						
Key: P Participant A Absent N Not invited I Invited W Withdrawn					Adrian Fontes	Mark Finchem
1	Sep. 22, 2022	KAET	Ted Simons	YouTube	P	P

=== Predictions ===
Source	Ranking	As of
Sabato's Crystal Ball	Tossup	November 3, 2022
Elections Daily	Lean D	November 7, 2022

=== Post-primary endorsements ===
Adrian Fontes (D)

U.S. Executive Branch officials

- Dennis K. Burke, former United States Attorney for the District of Arizona (2009–2011)
- Marco A. López Jr., former Chief of Staff of U.S. Customs and Border Protection (2009–2011), former Director of the Arizona Department of Commerce (2008–2009), former Mayor of Nogales (2001–2004), candidate for Governor of Arizona in 2022
- Barack Obama, 44th President of the United States (2009–2017)

U.S. Senators

- Dennis DeConcini, former Chair of the Senate Intelligence Committee (1993–1995), former U.S. Senator from Arizona (1977–1995)

U.S. Representatives

- Liz Cheney, U.S. Representative for Wyoming's at-large congressional district (2017–2023) (Republican)
- Raúl Grijalva, Chair of the House Committee on Natural Resources (2019–2023), Co-Chair of the Congressional Progressive Caucus (2009–2019), U.S. Representative from Arizona's 3rd congressional district (2013–2023), former U.S. Representative from Arizona's 7th congressional district (2003–2013)
- Adam Kinzinger, U.S. Representative for Illinois's 16th congressional district (2011–2023) (Republican)

Statewide officials

- Paul K. Charlton, United States Attorney for the District of Arizona (2001–2006)
- Anna Tovar, Member of the Arizona Corporation Commission (2021–present), former Member of the Arizona Senate from the 19th district (2013–2015), former Member of the Arizona House of Representatives from the 13th district (2009–2013)

State legislators

- Sean Bowie, Member of the Arizona Senate from the 18th district (2017–present)
- Heather Carter, Member of the Arizona Senate from the 15th district (2019–2021), former Member of the Arizona House of Representatives (2011–2019) (Republican)
- Andrea Dalessandro, Member of the Arizona House of Representatives from the 2nd district (2013–2014, 2021–present), former Member of the Arizona Senate from the 2nd district (2014–2021)
- Mitzi Epstein, Member of the Arizona House of Representatives from the 18th district (2017–present)
- Steve Farley, Member of the Arizona Senate from the 9th district (2013–2019), former Member of the Arizona House of Representatives from the 28th district (2007–2013)
- Brian Fernandez, Member of the Arizona Senate from the 4th district (2021–present)
- Sally Ann Gonzales, Member of the Arizona Senate from the 3rd district (2019–present), former Member of the Arizona House of Representatives from the 3rd district (2013–2019), former Member of the Arizona House of Representatives from the 27th district (2011–2013), former Member of the Arizona House of Representatives from the 20th district (1997–2001)
- Deb Gullett, Member of the Arizona House of Representatives from the 18th district (2001–2005) (Republican)
- Joel John, Member of the Arizona Senate from the 4th district (2021–present) (Republican)
- Lorenzo Sierra, Member of the Arizona House of Representatives from the 19th district (2019–present)
- Roberta Voss, Member of the Arizona House of Representatives from the 19th district (1997-2003) (Republican)

Local officials

- Steve Gallardo, Member of the Maricopa County Board of Supervisors from the 5th district (2015–present), former Member of the Arizona Senate from the 29th district (2013–2015), former Member of the Arizona Senate from the 13th district (2011–2013), former Member of the Arizona House of Representatives from the 13th district (2003–2009)
- John Giles, Mayor of Mesa (2014–present) (Republican)
- Neil Giuliano, Mayor of Tempe (1994–2004)
- Phil Gordon, former Mayor of Phoenix (2004–2012), former Member of the Phoenix City Council (1997–2004)
- Paul Johnson, Mayor of Phoenix (1990–1994) (Independent)
- Regina Romero, Mayor of Tucson (2019–present)
- Rick Romley, County Attorney for Maricopa County (1989–2004, 2010) (Republican)

Individuals

- Don Bivens, former Chair of the Arizona Democratic Party (2009–2011)

Organizations

- End Citizens United
- Equality Arizona
- Everytown for Gun Safety
- Latino Victory
- National Organization for Women
- Stonewall Democrats of Arizona
- VoteVets.org

Labor unions

- AFL–CIO
- American Federation of State, County and Municipal Employees
- Communications Workers of America
- International Brotherhood of Electrical Workers
- LiUNA Building America
- Teamsters Local 104
- UFCW Local 99
- United Mine Workers of America

=== Polling ===
Graphical summary

Poll source	Date(s) administered	Sample size	Margin of error	Adrian Fontes (D)	Mark Finchem (R)	Other	Undecided
Data Orbital (R)	November 4–6, 2022	550 (LV)	± 4.3%	47%	48%	1% (Note: "Refused" with 1%)	4%
KAConsulting (R) (Note: Poll conducted for Citizens United, a conservative non-profit organization.)	November 2–3, 2022	501 (LV)	± 4.4%	43%	45%	–	9%
HighGround Inc.	November 1–2, 2022	500 (LV)	± 4.4%	45%	42%	2% (Note: "Some other candidate" with 2%)	11%
Big Data Poll (R)	October 31 – November 2, 2022	1,501 (LV)	± 3.0%	47%	47%	–	6%
OH Predictive Insights	October 24–26, 2022	600 (LV)	± 4.0%	48%	42%	–	11%
Siena College/NYT	October 24–26, 2022	604 (LV)	± 4.4%	47%	40%	–	13%
BSP Research/Shaw & Co. (Note: Poll conducted for Univision.)	October 19–26, 2022	1,000 (RV)	± 3.1%	38%	37%	5% (Note: "Someone else" with 5%)	20%
Susquehanna Polling & Research (R) (Note: Poll conducted for The Federalist, a conservative online magazine.)	October 14–18, 2022	600 (LV)	± 4.0%	47%	42%	1% (Note: "Other" with 1%; "Refused" with <1%)	10%
HighGround Inc.	October 12–13, 2022	500 (LV)	± 4.4%	41%	42%	1% (Note: "Some other candidate" with 1%)	15%
CNN/SSRS	September 26 – October 2, 2022	900 (RV)	± 4.4%	45%	44%	10% (Note: "Neither" with 7%; "Other" with 3%)	–
CNN/SSRS	September 26 – October 2, 2022	795 (LV)	± 4.6%	45%	49%	6% (Note: "Neither" with 4%; "Other" with 2%)	1%
SurveyUSA (D) (Note: Poll sponsored by Fontes' campaign.)	September 27–30, 2022	563 (LV)	± 5.2%	44%	41%	–	15%
Global Strategy Group (D) (Note: This poll was sponsored by End Citizens United and Let America Vote, who support Fontes)	September 13–20, 2022	800 (LV)	± 3.5%	46%	44%	–	10%
The Trafalgar Group (R)	September 14–17, 2022	1080 (LV)	± 2.9%	41%	48%	–	11%
OH Predictive Insights	September 6–9, 2022	654 (LV)	± 3.83%	35%	40%	–	25%

Hypothetical polling

Katie Hobbs vs. Michelle Ugenti-Rita

Poll source	Date(s) administered	Sample size	Margin of error	Katie Hobbs (D)	Michelle Ugenti-Rita (R)	Undecided
OH Predictive Insights	March 8–12, 2021	690 (RV)	± 3.7%	36%	30%	35%

Generic Democrat vs. generic Republican

Poll source	Date(s) administered	Sample size	Margin of error	Generic Democrat	Generic Republican	Undecided
OH Predictive Insights	September 7–12, 2021	882 (RV)	± 3.3%	34%	37%	28%

=== Results ===
State legislative districts results

2022 Arizona Secretary of State election
Party	Candidate	Votes	%	±%
Democratic	Adrian Fontes	1,320,619	52.38%	+1.95%
Republican	Mark Finchem	1,200,411	47.62%	−1.94%
Total votes		2,521,030	100.0%	
Democratic hold				

==== By county ====
County	Adrian Fontes Democratic		Mark Finchem Republican		Write-in		Margin		Total votes
County	#	%	#	%	#	%	#	%	Total votes
Apache	17,476	66.57	8,776	33.43	5	0.02	8,700	33.14	26,614
Cochise	19,402	41.97	26,827	58.03	48	0.10	-7,425	-16.06	46,666
Coconino	34,482	64.15	19,270	35.85	40	0.07	14,212	28.30	54,727
Gila	8,176	36.70	14,103	63.30	13	0.06	-5,927	-26.6	22,450
Graham	3,246	30.27	7,478	69.73	0	0.00	-4,232	-39.46	10,847
Greenlee	978	40.63	1,429	59.37	0	0.00	-451	-18.74	2,446
La Paz	1,736	31.89	3,708	68.11	6	0.11	-1,972	-36.22	5,499
Maricopa	813,492	53.67	702,376	46.33	469	0.03	111,116	7.34	1,543,535
Mohave	20,901	26.05	59,320	73.95	16	0.02	-38,419	-47.90	81,510
Navajo	18,701	46.77	21,280	53.23	13	0.03	-2,579	-6.46	40,411
Pima	244,349	61.86	150,680	38.14	121	0.03	93,669	23.72	398,553
Pinal	62,618	44.00	79,696	56.00	34	0.02	-17,078	-12.00	143,826
Santa Cruz	9,181	70.14	3,909	29.86	4	0.03	5,272	40.28	13,099
Yavapai	45,876	37.59	76,162	62.41	43	0.03	-30,286	-24.82	123,191
Yuma	20,005	44.06	25,397	55.94	8	0.02	-5,392	-11.88	46,111
Totals	1,320,619	52.38	1,200,411	47.62	820	0.03	17,117	0.67	2,559,485

==== By congressional district ====
District	Fontes	Finchem	Representative
1st	54%	46%	David Schweikert
2nd	47%	53%	Tom O'Halleran (117th Congress)
2nd	47%	53%	Eli Crane (118th Congress)
3rd	78%	22%	Ruben Gallego
4th	59%	41%	Greg Stanton
5th	45%	55%	Andy Biggs
6th	54%	46%	Ann Kirkpatrick (117th Congress)
6th	54%	46%	Juan Ciscomani (118th Congress)
7th	68%	32%	Raúl Grijalva
8th	47%	53%	Debbie Lesko
9th	38%	62%	Paul Gosar

== Exit poll ==
2022 Arizona Secretary of State election voter demographics (CNN)
Demographic subgroup	Fontes	Finchem	% of total vote
Ideology
Liberals	98	2	22
Moderates	62	38	42
Conservatives	10	87	36
Party
Democrats	96	3	27
Republicans	11	88	33
Independents	55	42	40
Joe Biden approval rating
Approve	96	3	43
Disapprove	16	81	56
Most important issue to your vote
Inflation	29	68	36
Abortion	89	10	32
Immigration	15	84	18
Crime	N/A	N/A	6
Gun policy	N/A	N/A	6
2020 presidential vote
Joe Biden	94	5	47
Donald Trump	8	91	45
Another candidate	N/A	N/A	5
Did not vote	N/A	N/A	3
Gender
Men	49	49	46
Women	54	44	54
Race
White	50	48	70
Latino	58	42	18
Black	N/A	N/A	4
Asian	N/A	N/A	1
Other	N/A	N/A	7
Race by gender
White men	48	50	34
White women	53	47	35
Black men	N/A	N/A	1
Black women	N/A	N/A	3
Latino men	N/A	N/A	8
Latina women	N/A	N/A	11
Other	N/A	N/A	8
Age
18–29	72	24	12
30–44	56	42	20
45–64	45	54	34
65 or older	50	49	34
Area type
Urban	56	42	46
Suburban	48	50	47
Rural	N/A	N/A	7
Education
College graduate	58	41	40
No college degree	48	50	60
Education by race
White college graduates	58	40	32
Whites without college	43	55	38
Non-white college graduates	55	42	8
Non-whites without college	56	42	22
Education by race and gender
White women with college degrees	61	38	16
White women without college degrees	46	54	20
White men with college degrees	56	43	17
White men without college degrees	40	57	18
Voters of color	56	42	30
Educational attainment
Never attended college	N/A	N/A	10
Some college	53	45	31
Associate's degree	42	58	19
Bachelor's degree	54	43	23
Advanced degree	62	37	18

== Post-election legal challenge ==
In December 2022, Mark Finchem filed a lawsuit petitioning for the election to be "nullified and redone"; the lawsuit was dismissed with prejudice that month by Maricopa County Superior Court Judge Melissa Julian, confirming Adrian Fontes' victory in the election. While Finchem alleged that voting machines in Arizona were not properly certified, the judge rejected this, because the Election Assistance Commission did not vote to revoke certification, which is the procedure under federal law, so the judge rejected the merits of Finchem's arguments on voting machines certification. The judge also rejected the merits of Finchem's arguments on voting software certification. Next, regarding Finchem's issues with tabulating machines and a website listing for an estimated number of votes, the judge concluded that Finchem "does not allege that any of the votes cast were actually illegal" and does not allege that any legal vote was not counted, but only alleged "suspicions that some votes may not have been counted", so the judge rejected this argument as insufficient to overturn an election.

Then, the judge rejected Finchem's allegations of "misconduct" by Secretary of State Katie Hobbs as insufficient. Finchem argued that Hobbs should have recused after her gubernatorial opponent Kari Lake "perceived a conflict of interest", with the judge responding that this were "not well-pled facts; they are legal conclusions masquerading as alleged facts", and legal conclusions unsupported by Arizona law. Regarding Hobbs' actions in telling Mohave County and Cochise County to certify their election by the November 28 deadline, the judge stated that it was Hobbs' responsibility "to ensure the canvass and certification of a general election is completed within the statutorily prescribed timeframes", and that it was not misconduct for her "to communicate with other governing bodies to ensure" thus. Finally, the judge rejected Finchem's protest over his allegation that Twitter suspended his account in October 2022 as irrelevant because Twitter is not an "election official".

Finchem appealed the rejection of his election challenge, then abandoned the appeal in July 2023, with his lawyer citing other failed 2022 election challenging lawsuits in Arizona.

== Notes ==
Partisan clients
