= Anthony Kern =

American politician

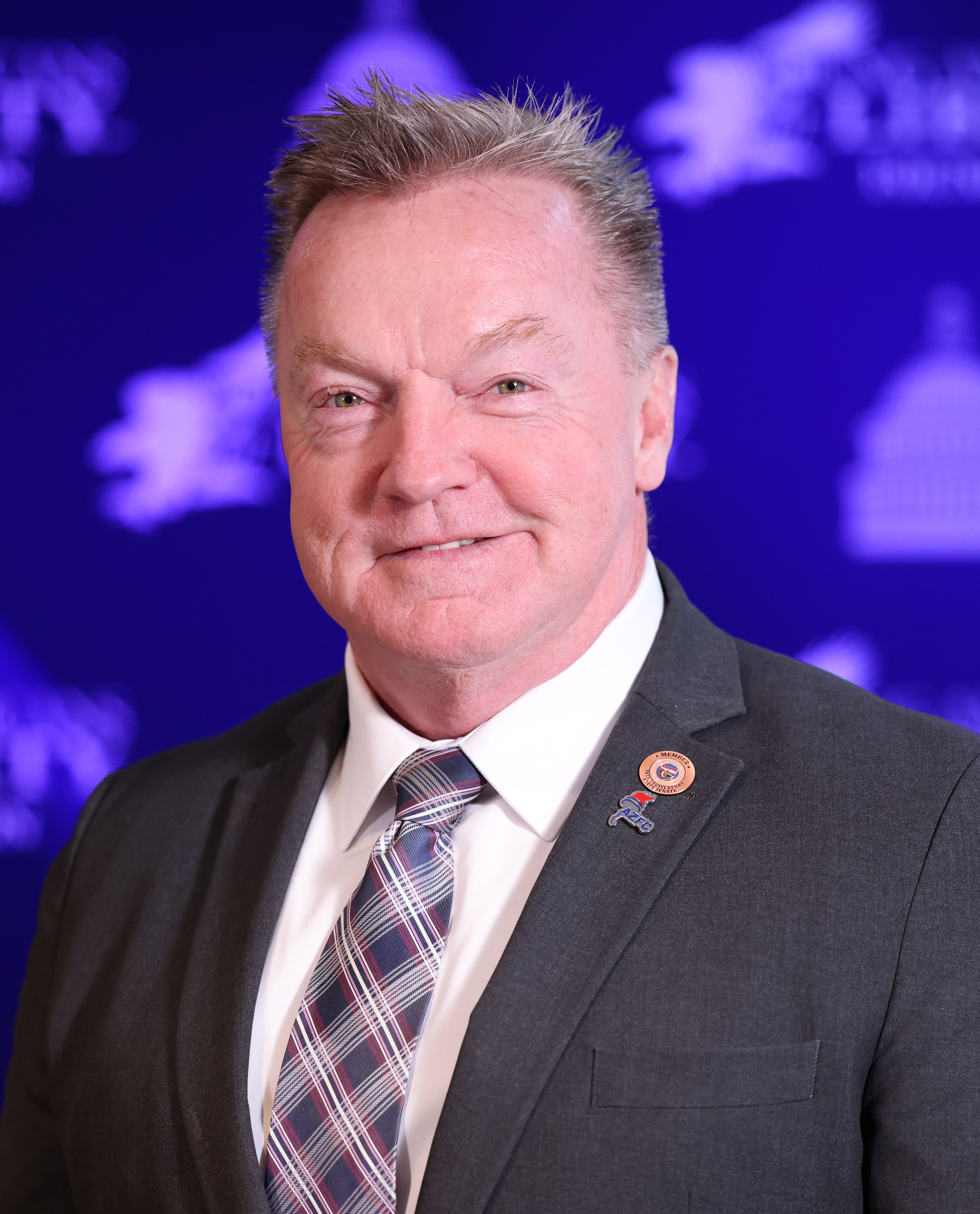
- Kern in 2024

Member of the Arizona Senate from the 27th district
- In office January 9, 2023 – January 13, 2025
- Preceded by: Rebecca Rios (redistricting)
- Succeeded by: Kevin Payne

Member of the Arizona House of Representatives from the 20th district
- In office January 5, 2015 – January 11, 2021 Serving with Shawnna Bolick
- Preceded by: Carl Seel
- Succeeded by: Judy Schwiebert

Personal details
- Party: Republican
- Education: Northern Arizona University
- Website: votekern.com

Anthony Kern is an American politician who served in the Arizona Senate representing the 27th district from 2023 to 2025. A Republican, he was previously a member of the Arizona House of Representatives from 2015 to 2021.

After the 2020 presidential election, in which Joe Biden defeated Donald Trump both nationally and in Arizona, Kern, a member of the Arizona Freedom Caucus, denied the election results and sought to overturn the election to keep Trump in power. Kern was among the fake slate of pro-Trump electors who unsuccessfully tried to cast Arizona's electoral votes for Trump, and was indicted by a grand jury in April 2024. He ran for U.S. Congress in 2024, but lost in the Republican primary.

== Education ==
Kern earned his bachelor's degree in business administration from Northern Arizona University. He also graduated from Glendale Community College's Law Enforcement Training Academy.

== Career before politics ==
Kern worked for the El Mirage Police Department from March 2005 to November 2014, as a code enforcement officer. He is not a certified peace officer, despite falsely claiming to be a certified officer in a 2015 legislative debate, as well as on financial disclosure forms.

During his tenure at the department, Kern was disciplined several times. In June 2014, the police department placed Kern on administrative leave for lying to a superior about a lost city-owned tablet computer. In August 2014, following a disciplinary hearing, Kern was fired from the police department. In 2014, the Maricopa County Attorney's Office added his name to its "Brady List" of officers with a record of misconduct or dishonesty.

As a legislator, he tried to pass a law that would remove his name from the list, without informing the sponsor that it would apply to him. After it was disclosed that the bill was for Kern's benefit, House Bill 2671 was amended to eliminate the provisions that would have helped him.

== Tenure in state legislature ==
Kern and Paul Boyer defeated Amy Schwabenlender in the November 2014 general election. Kern received 23,799 votes. In 2016, Kern and Boyer ran unopposed in the Republican primary for state House in District 20. They defeated Democrat Chris Gilfillan on November 8. Kern was the second vote getter in the election with 39,118 votes.

In 2016, Kern sponsored legislation to eliminate "free speech zones" on college and university campuses. In 2020, however, Kern introduced legislation to compel each Arizona public university to create an "Office of Public Policy Events" to track speakers invited to campus and create a report (possibly for leaders in the state legislature to review). Kern said he wanted to require universities to search for and fund speakers with alternative viewpoints on issues.

In 2017, Kern sponsored a bill to make it a misdemeanor to be a passenger in an automobile without an ID. In 2019, Kern was chairman of the House Rules Committee, a powerful "gatekeeper" post that allowed him to great influence.

Kern held posts as chairman of the Committee on Rules and vice chairman of the Committee on Public Safety, a role in which he exerted influence over criminal justice litigation. After it was revealed in 2019 that Kern had been fired from the El Mirage Police Department for dishonesty, Kern was not removed from those roles, despite calls from some progressive groups for him to step down.

In October 2016, Kern became a Tombstone reserve marshal, holding this role simultaneously with his state House seat. A progressive activist filed a complaint with the House Ethics Committee, arguing that, by accepting the deputy marshal position, Kern should be determined to have vacated his legislative seat due to the provision in the Arizona Constitution barring legislators from simultaneously holding other government roles. Kern resigned as deputy marshal in March 2019, just after the complaint was submitted. The committee dismissed the complaint in May 2019, determining that because the deputy marshal position was unpaid, Kern was not "otherwise employed" in government and that the position was not a "public office of profit or trust" that would disqualify him from the legislature.

In 2019, according to his LinkedIn page, Kern was a private investigator and campus security officer for Grand Canyon University.

=== Attempt to overturn 2020 presidential election ===
Kern lost his bid for reelection in 2020; he was the only Arizona Legislature Republican to lose a seat that year. He left office on January 10, 2021.

After the 2020 presidential election, in which Joe Biden defeated Donald Trump both nationally and in Arizona, Kern denied the election results and sought to overturn the election to keep Trump in power.

In November and December 2020, Kern was one of several Arizona Republican legislators whom conservative activist Ginni Thomas (the wife of Supreme Court justice Clarence Thomas) pressed to overturn the election results and keep Trump in power. In December 2020, Kern joined Republican U.S. Representative Louie Gohmert in a lawsuit filed in federal district court against Vice President Mike Pence. The suit, based on Trump's baseless claims of voter fraud, sought to overturn parts of the federal Electoral Count Act and prevent electoral votes for President-elect Biden from being counted in Congress. The suit was rejected by the courts.

In December 2020, Kern was among the fake slate of pro-Trump electors, a group of eleven Arizona Republicans who (claiming to be "alternate electors") unsuccessfully tried, in December 2022, to cast Arizona's electoral votes for Trump. The group signed a fraudulent certificate of ascertainment asserting Trump had won the 2020 presidential election. Republicans in six other states also signed false certificates. The aim of the scheme was to persuade Pence (who, as vice president, presides over the counting of the electoral votes) to recognize the bogus certificates (which would exceed his constitutional authority), giving Trump another term in office; Pence declined to do so.

On January 6, 2021, Kern attended the pro-Trump "Stop the Steal" rally in Washington, D.C., and was present at the subsequent attack on the U.S. Capitol. Kern posted a video to his Twitter account which showed his attendance of the event, and in which he stated: "I will put politics aside if I never win another election. Trump, every time I heard him on TV, it was like he was my friend. Why? Because here's the President of the United States who was sticking up for little old me." Kern later depicted the violent attack as a peaceful demonstration, claiming that only "a small few" committed crimes.

In February 2021, Democratic legislator Charlene Fernandez, along with 43 other Democrats, signed a letter criticizing Kern and other Arizona Republicans (Mark Finchem and Paul Gosar) for their connections to the January 6 insurrection. Kern, Finchem, and Gosar sued Fernandez, claiming defamation. The court dismissed Kern's suit. Ruling that the suit was "groundless," "not made in good faith," and was filed "primarily for purposes of harassment," the court also ordered the plaintiffs to pay $75,000 in attorneys' fees to Fernandez. After being sanctioned by the court, Kern introduced legislation to restrict attorney discipline that the State Bar of Arizona or Arizona Supreme Court could impose.

In April 2021 Kern was among the people helping to count and inspect ballots as part of an "audit" of the Maricopa County presidential votes ordered by the Republican-led state Senate, though the contract for the audit said that the ballot counters would be nonpartisan.

In April 2024, Kern was among the eleven "Fake Electors" indicted by Arizona Attorney General Kris Mayes for signing a certificate, "...claiming to be Arizona's 11 electors to the Electoral College, though Biden won the state by 10,457 votes and state officials certified his electors." Overall, eighteen people were indicted. On May 21, 2024, Kern and 10 others pled not guilty after being arraigned.

=== Return to legislature in 2023 ===
In 2022, Kern ran again for legislature, seeking a state Senate seat. Trump endorsed his candidacy, along with the candidacy of fellow Arizona election denier Wendy Rogers.

During Governor Katie Hobbs' State of the State address in January 2023, Kern and fellow Republican state Senator Justine Wadsack stood and turned their backs to the governor; four Republican representatives walked out mid-speech. After the speech, Hobbs said that it was "unfortunate that some members chose an immature stunt instead, but we have really tough issues in front of us and we need to work together to stop them."

In 2023, Kern and other members of the Arizona Freedom Caucus (a faction of Republicans within the legislature), announced their opposition to ranked-choice voting in Arizona; Kern called RCV "rigged-choice voting."

Kern in April 2024 brought and guided a religious group in conducting a prayer circle over the state seal on the Arizona Senate floor, with Kern declaring: "right now, we ask thee to release the presence of the lord in the senate chamber", with the religious group speaking in tongues; Kern later fired back at criticism over his action, characterizing critics as "god-haters", and declaring that "prayer over our state at the State Senate is way more powerful" than the critics.

Later in April 2024, when Democratic Arizona Senator Anna Hernandez tried to introduce a bill to repeal Arizona's 1864 abortion ban law, Kern repeatedly led attempts to block Hernandez's bill.

In 2024, instead of running for reelection, Kern decided to run for the seat being vacated by U.S. Congresswoman Debbie Lesko in Arizona's 8th congressional district, however Kern lost the Republican primary to Abraham Hamadeh, placing fifth among a crowded field.
