= Heather Carter =

American politician

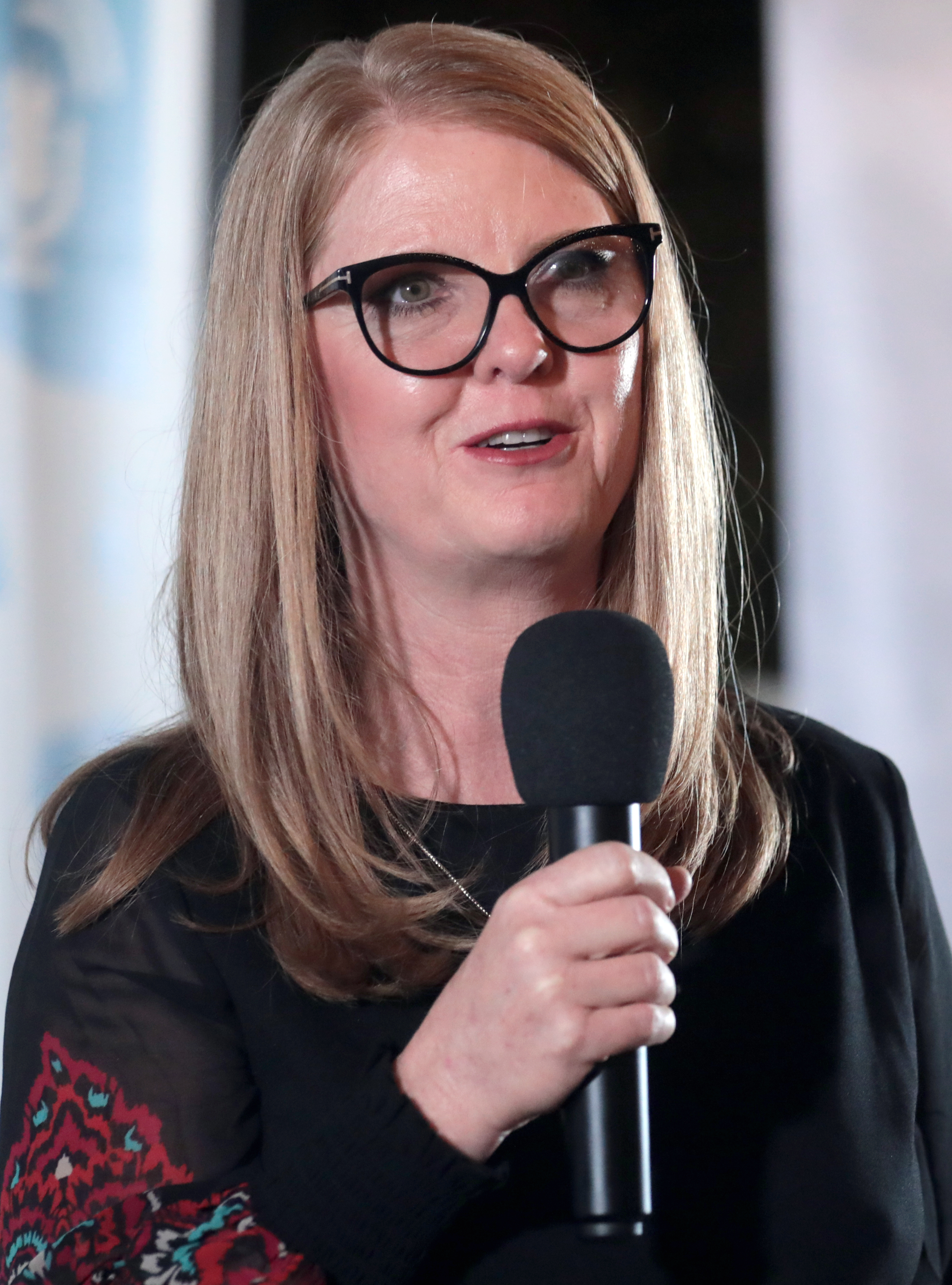
- Carter in 2022

Member of the Arizona Senate from the 15th district
- In office January 14, 2019 – January 11, 2021
- Preceded by: Nancy Barto
- Succeeded by: Nancy Barto

Member of the Arizona House of Representatives from the 15th district
- In office January 14, 2013 – January 14, 2019 Serving with John Allen
- Succeeded by: Nancy Barto

Member of the Arizona House of Representatives from the 7th district
- In office January 10, 2011 – January 14, 2013 Serving with David Smith

Personal details
- Party: Republican
- Education: Arizona State University; Northern Arizona University
- Profession: Educator
- Website: voteheathercarter.com

Heather Carter is an American politician and a former Republican member of the Arizona State Senate representing District 15 from 2019 to 2021. She previously served in the Arizona House of Representatives representing District 15 from 2013 to 2019. Carter also previously served consecutively from 2011 until 2013, in the District 7 seat.

She has been described by The Arizona Republic and the Associated Press as a moderate or centrist Republican.

== Education ==
Carter earned her bachelor's degree in communication and her master's degree in education technology from Arizona State University, and her EdD in educational leadership from Northern Arizona University.

== Elections ==
- 2012: Redistricted to District 15 with fellow incumbent Representative David Smith Carter ran in the four-way August 28, 2012 Republican Primary; Carter placed first with 13,196 votes, and John Allen placed second ahead of Representative Smith; Carter and Allen won the four-way November 6, 2012 General election, with Carter taking the first seat with 50,716 votes and Allen taking the second seat ahead of Democratic nominee Patricia Flickner.
- 2010: When District 7 incumbent Republican Representatives Nancy Barto and Ray Barnes both ran for Arizona Senate and left both House seats open, Carter ran in the seven-way August 24, 2010 Republican Primary, placing second with 6,665 votes; in the five-way November 2, 2010 General election, Carter took the first seat with 37,254 votes, and fellow Republican David Smith took the second seat ahead of Democratic nominees Don Chilton, Peter Royers, and Libertarian candidate James Ianuzzo, who had run for legislative seats in 2004, 2006, and 2008.
