= Rosanna Gabaldón =

American politician

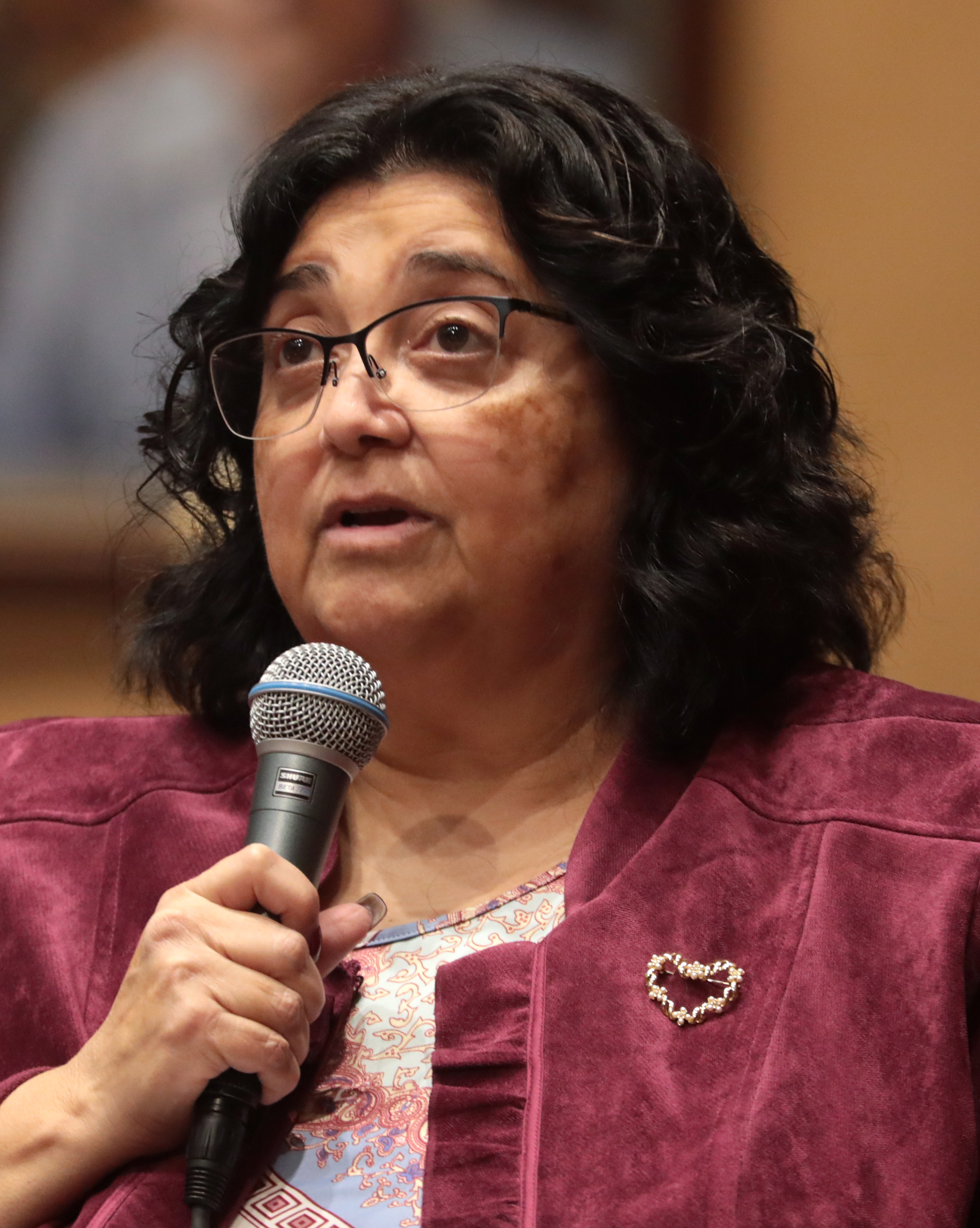

Member of the Arizona Senate from the 21st district
- Incumbent
- Assumed office January 9, 2023
- Preceded by: Rick Gray

Member of the Arizona Senate from the 2nd district
- In office January 11, 2021 – January 9, 2023
- Preceded by: Andrea Dalessandro
- Succeeded by: Steve Kaiser

Member of the Arizona House of Representatives from the 2nd district
- In office January 14, 2013 – January 11, 2021
- Preceded by: Albert Hale
- Succeeded by: Andrea Dalessandro

Personal details
- Born: Bermuda
- Party: Democratic
- Profession: Community Development
- Website: votegabaldon.com

Rosanna Gabaldón is an American politician serving as a member of the Arizona Senate from the 21st district. She previously served as a member of the Arizona House of Representatives from January 14, 2013, to January 11, 2021, and as a member of the Arizona Senate from the 2nd district from January 11, 2021, to January 9, 2023.

== Early life and education ==
Gabaldón was born in Bermuda while her father served in the U.S. Air Force. She attended Central High School in Phoenix.

== Elections ==
- Gabaldόn ran and was successful in a contested primary election in August 2016, she and Daniel Hernández Jr. went on to win the general election.
- In 2014 Gabaldόn won reelection over Republican John Ackerley. Rosanna came in first ahead of Ackerley and Democratic Demion Clinco in the general election with 21,200 votes.
- Gabaldόn ran in an uncontested election in the August 26, 2014 Democratic primary, with 9,922 votes,
- Gabaldόn ran and was successful in a contested general election and won one of two seats in the November 6, 2012 with 27,081 votes, above Republican nominee John Ackerly.
- Gabaldόn ran in an uncontested primary election in the August 28, 2012 Democratic primary, with 9,158 votes,
- Gabaldόn ran and was successful in a contested race for in May 2009, for Sahuarita Town Council.
