= Nancy Barto =

American politician

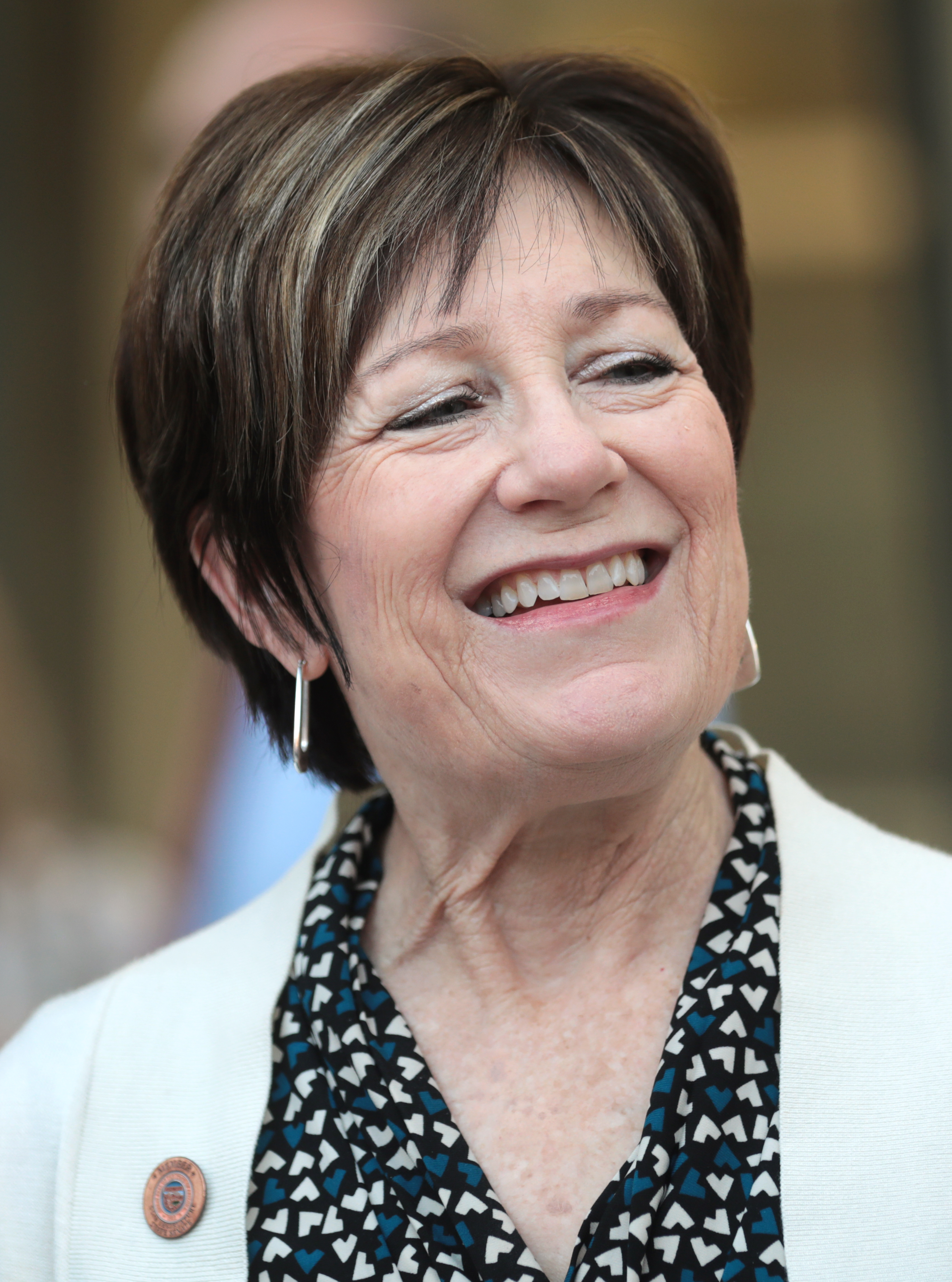
- Barto in 2022

Member of the Arizona Senate from the 15th district
- In office January 11, 2021 – January 9, 2023
- Preceded by: Heather Carter
- Succeeded by: Christine Marsh

Member of the Arizona House of Representatives from the 15th district
- In office January 14, 2019 – January 11, 2021 Serving with John Allen
- Preceded by: Heather Carter
- Succeeded by: Justin Wilmeth

Member of the Arizona Senate from the 15th district
- In office January 14, 2013 – January 14, 2019
- Preceded by: David Lujan
- Succeeded by: Heather Carter

Member of the Arizona Senate from the 7th district
- In office January 10, 2011 – January 14, 2013
- Preceded by: Jim Waring
- Succeeded by: Jack Jackson, Jr.

Member of the Arizona House of Representatives from the 7th district
- In office January 2007 – January 10, 2011 Serving with Ray Barnes (2007–2011)
- Preceded by: David Smith

Personal details
- Born: Chicago, Illinois
- Party: Republican
- Education: Arizona State University (West campus)
- Website: nancybarto.com

Nancy K. Barto (born in Chicago, Illinois) is an American politician and a former Republican member of the Arizona State Senate from 2021 to 2023. She previously served in the Arizona House of Representatives from 2019 to 2021 and the Arizona Senate representing District 15 from 2013 to 2019. Barto served consecutively in the Arizona State Legislature from January 2007 until January 10, 2011, in the Arizona House of Representatives District 7 seat, then in the Arizona Senate in the District 7 seat from January 10, 2011, until January 14, 2013.

== Tenure in office ==
Barto sponsored a bill to prohibit cities and counties in Arizona from banning plastic bags. The governor signed the bill into law in April 2015.

A social conservative, Barto has promoted anti-abortion legislation. She is often allied with the Center for Arizona Policy, a Christian right group. In 2010, Barto sponsored a measure to extend Arizona's two-month mandatory waiting period to obtain a divorce to six months. In 2020, while in the state House, Barto sponsored legislation that banned sex education before the fifth grade and requiring written permission from parents (an "opt-in") before students could be taught about HIV/AIDS, sexuality, gender identity or gender expression. In 2020, she narrowly ousted incumbent state Senator Heather Carter, defeating her in a Republican primary challenge from the right following a heated race.

As chair of the House Health and Human Services Committee, Barto sponsored anti-vaccination bills, and supporting vaping legislation supported by the tobacco industry. Public health officials warned that Barto's three bills in 2019 to expand vaccination exemptions and discourage vaccination would reduce immunization rates in Arizona and endanger public health. One bill, HB2470, would have added a non-medical "religious belief" exemption for childhood vaccines, and removed a signature requirement for parents. The proposed repeal would end a requirement that parents exempting children from vaccines acknowledge the risk of serious illness and death from infectious disease. Another bill, HB2471, would require doctors to inform parents about potential risks of vaccines and how to file for injury claims related to vaccines. The third bill, HB2472 would require doctors to offer a blood test prior to vaccination; the test would determine if a child already possesses the antibodies that would be developed from a vaccine.

During the COVID-19 pandemic in Arizona, Barto promoted baseless claims that hydroxychloroquine was a COVID-19 cure, and discouraged COVID-19 vaccination.

In 2020, Barto was one of 13 Arizona Republican state legislators who supported Donald Trump's failed attempt to overturn his loss in the 2020 presidential election.

In 2022, she sponsored legislation that banned abortion after 15 weeks of pregnancy. Barto lost reelection to Christine Marsh.

== Elections ==
2006: To challenge House District 7 incumbent Republican Representatives Ray Barnes and David Smith, Barto ran in the four-way September 12, 2006 Republican Primary; Barto placed first with 7,218 votes and Representative Barnes placed second; in the five-way November 7, 2006 General election, Barto took the first seat with 29,952 votes and Representative Barnes took the second seat ahead of Democratic nominees Marilyn Fox, Jeanne Lunn, and Libertarian candidate Jim Iannuzo, who had run for a House seat in 2004.

Summary of the 2006 Arizona Republican Primary Election for State House District 7
Party	Candidate	Votes	Percentage
Republican	Nancy Barto†	7,218	38.7%
Republican	Ray Barnes†	4,724	25.3%
Republican	David Burnell Smith	4,392	23.5%
Republican	Howard Sprague	2,331	12.5%
Total		18,665	100%

† Won nomination for general election

Summary of the 2006 Arizona General Election for State House District 7
Party	Candidate	Votes	Percentage
Republican	Nancy Barto	29,952	29.7%
Republican	Ray Barnes	27,897	27.7%
Democratic	Marilyn Fox	21,143	21.0%
Democratic	Jeanne Lunn	2,331	19.5%
Libertarian	Jim Iannuzo	2,128	2.1%
Total		100,721	100%

'2008: Barto, Republican Representative Barnes, Democratic nominee Jeanne Lunn, and Libertarian candidate Jim Iannuzo were unopposed for their September 2, 2008 primaries, setting up a rematch; in the four-way November 4, 2008 General election, Barto took the first seat with 46,854 votes and Representative Barnes took the second seat ahead of Democratic nominee Jeanne Lunn and Libertarian candidate Jim Iannuzo.

Summary of the 2008 Arizona General Election for State House District 7
Party	Candidate	Votes	Percentage
Republican	Nancy Barto	46,854	36.6%
Republican	Ray Barnes	40,471	31.6%
Democratic	Jeanne Lunn	31,753	24.8%
Libertarian	Jim Iannuzo	8,966	7.0%
Total		128,044	100%

2010: When Republican Senator Jim Waring ran for Phoenix City Council and left the Senate District 7 seat open, Barto and Representative Barnes both ran in the four-way August 24, 2010 Republican Primary, where Barto placed first with 10,475 votes (46.2%); in the November 2, 2010 General election, winning with 41,849 votes (67.2%) against Democratic nominee Eric Shelley.

Summary of the 2010 Arizona Republican Primary Election for State Senate District 7
Party	Candidate	Votes	Percentage
Republican	Nancy Barto†	10,475	46.2%
Republican	Ray Barnes	7,461	32.8%
Republican	Bob Green	3,254	14.3%
Republican	Brad Buch	1,503	6.6%
Total		22,693	100%

† Won nomination for general election

Summary of the 2010 Arizona General Election for State Senate District 7
Party	Candidate	Votes	Percentage
Republican	Nancy Barto	41,849	67.2%
Democratic	Eric Shelley	20,441	32.8%
Total		62,290	100%

2012: State Senator – District No. 15 Redistricted to District 15, Barto was unopposed for the August 28, 2012 Republican Primary, winning with 19,162 votes, and won the November 6, 2012 General election with 58,283 votes (73.2%) against Libertarian nominee Dennis Grenier.

Summary of the 2012 Arizona General Election for State Senate District 15
Party	Candidate	Votes	Percentage
Republican	Nancy Barto	58,213	73.1%
Libertarian	Dennis Grenier	21,384	26.9%
Total		79,597	100%

2014: State Senator – District No. 15: Barto defeated David Ryan in the primary, then ran unopposed in the general election.

Summary of the 2014 Arizona Republican Primary Election for State Senate District 15
Party	Candidate	Votes	Percentage
Republican	Nancy Barto†	13,585	62.9%
Republican	David Ryan	8,012	37.1%
Total		21,597	100%

† Won nomination for general election

2016: State Senator – District No. 15 Barto ran unopposed in the primary, then defeated the Democratic candidate, Tonya MacBeth, in the general election.

Summary of the 2016 Arizona General Election for State Senate District 15
Party	Candidate	Votes	Percentage
Republican	Nancy Barto	62,691	63.3%
Democratic	Tonya K MacBeth	36,414	36.7%
Total		99,105	100%

2018: State Representative – District No. 15: Barto and John Allen ran unopposed in the primary, then both defeated the Democratic candidates, Julie Gunnigle and Jennifer Samuels, in the general election.

Summary of the 2018 Arizona General Election for State House District 15
Party	Candidate	Votes	Percentage
Republican	Nancy Barto	51,305	29.1%
Republican	John Allen	49,279	27.9%
Democratic	Jennifer Samuels	38,565	21.9%
Democratic	Julie Gunnigle	37,308	21.1%
Total		176,457	100%
