= Shawnna Bolick =

American politician (born 1975)

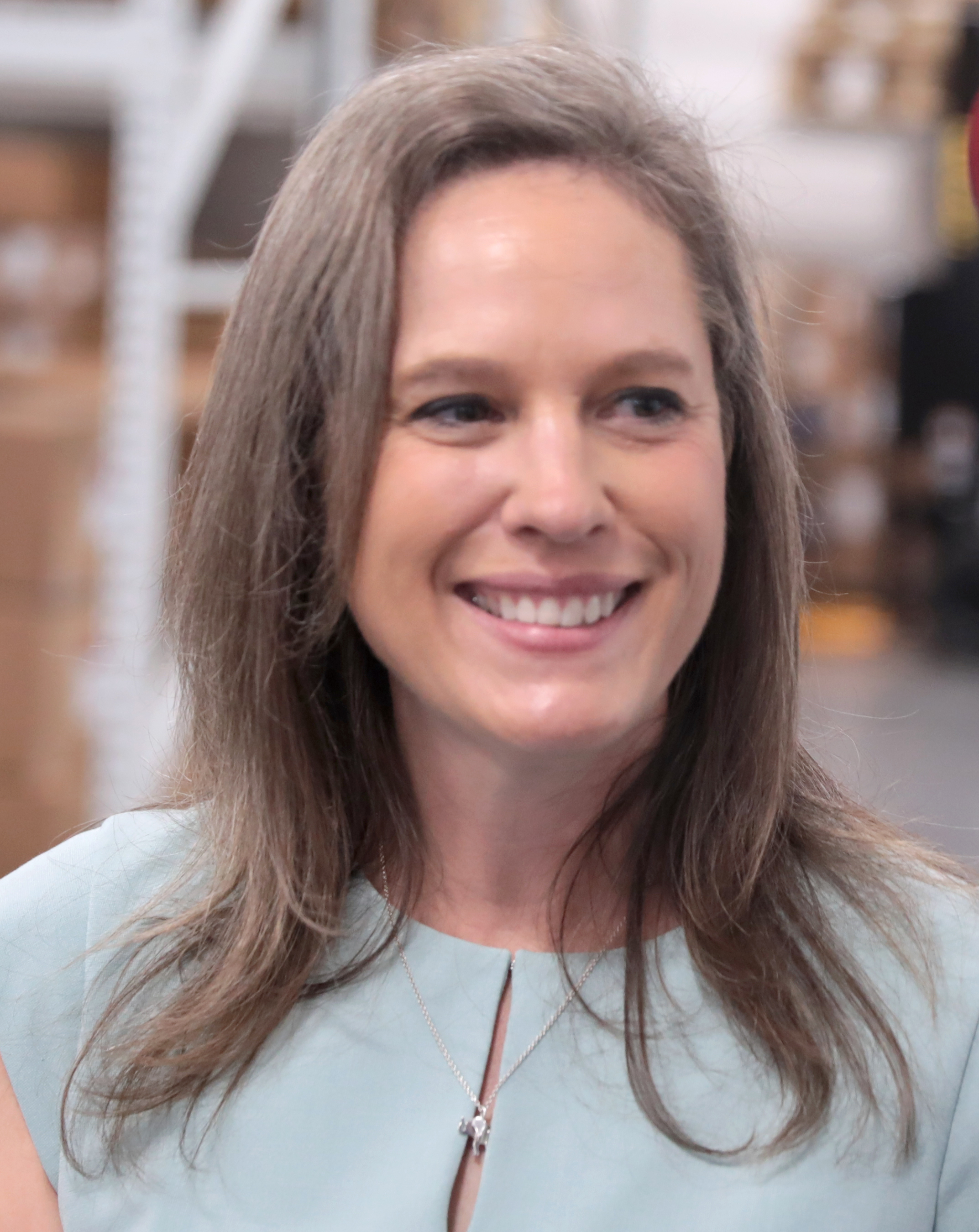
- Bolick in 2022

Member of the Arizona Senate from the 2nd district
- Incumbent
- Assumed office July 21, 2023
- Preceded by: Steve Kaiser
- Succeeded by: Amelia Gallitano (elect)

Member of the Arizona House of Representatives from the 20th district
- In office January 14, 2019 – January 9, 2023 Serving with Judy Schwiebert
- Preceded by: Paul Boyer
- Succeeded by: Justin Wilmeth

Personal details
- Born: Shawna Lee Matthews; 1975 (age 50–51) Pittsburgh, Pennsylvania, U.S.
- Party: Republican
- Spouse: Clint Bolick

Shawnna Bolick (born 1975) is an American politician who has been a member of the Arizona Senate from the 2nd district since July 2023. A Republican, she was a member of the Arizona House of Representatives representing District 20 from 2019 to 2023.

== Political career ==
Before being elected to the Arizona legislature, Bolick was a consultant to the Arizona Charter School Association and the Goldwater Institute. She ran unsuccessfully for Arizona House seats in District 11 and District 28 before winning a 2018 election for the 20th District.

During the COVID-19 pandemic, she opposed the expansion of mail-in voting.

On July 21, 2023, she was sworn in after being appointed to the Arizona Senate by the Maricopa County Board of Supervisors.

=== Attempt to overturn the 2020 election ===
After Joe Biden narrowly won Arizona in the 2020 presidential election and President Donald Trump refused to concede and made claims of voter fraud, Bolick urged Congress to throw out the presidential election results from Arizona and give the state's electoral college votes to Trump.

She also introduced legislation in January 2021 to rewrite the election laws in Arizona to give the state legislature the power to reject the election results "at any time before the presidential inauguration" (i.e., even after the results were certified by the Secretary of State and by the governor and the electoral votes counted by Congress). At the time, the legislature was controlled by the Republican Party. Some contend that the bill is inconsistent with the state constitution. Bolick's legislation would also prevent judges from throwing out baseless court cases without evidence; the cases would instead have to be adjudicated by a jury.

The bill, Arizona House Bill 2720, died in committee.

Bolick was a candidate in the 2022 Arizona Secretary of State election, but lost to State Representative Mark Finchem in the Republican primary. On July 19, 2023, she was selected by the Maricopa County Board of Supervisors to replace Steve Kaiser following his resignation from the Arizona Senate.

=== Overturning the 1864 Territorial Abortion Law ===
Following the Arizona Supreme Court's decision to reinstate an 1864 territorial abortion law, Shawnna Bolick was the first legislative Republican (alongside Senator T. J. Shope) who voted to repeal the ban, which contained no exceptions for rape or incest. On May 1, 2024, Bolick and Shope voted with all Democrats in the State Senate to repeal the ban on a vote of 16–14, one week after the State House voted 32–28 to repeal the ban.

== Personal life ==
Bolick moved to Arizona in 2001. She is married to Arizona Supreme Court Justice Clint Bolick. Justice Bolick is a longtime friend of U.S. Supreme Court Justice Clarence Thomas, who is godfather to Bolick's son. She has two children.
