= Andrea Dalessandro =

American politician

Member of the Arizona House of Representatives from the 2nd district
- In office January 11, 2021 – January 9, 2023
- Preceded by: Rosanna Gabaldón
- Succeeded by: Judy Schwiebert
- In office January 14, 2013 – January 21, 2014
- Succeeded by: Demion Clinco

Member of the Arizona Senate from the 2nd district
- In office January 21, 2014 – January 11, 2021
- Preceded by: Linda J. Lopez
- Succeeded by: Rosanna Gabaldón

Personal details
- Born: Jersey City, New Jersey, U.S.
- Party: Democratic
- Education: New Jersey City University (BA, MA); Rutgers University (MBA)
- Website: Campaign website

Andrea Dalessandro is an American politician and educator who previously served as a member of the Arizona House of Representatives and Arizona Senate from the 2nd district.

== Education ==
Dalessandro earned her Bachelor of Arts and Master of Arts in mathematics education from Jersey City State College (now New Jersey City University), followed by a Master of Business Administration from Rutgers University.

== Elections ==
- 2012 Redistricted to District 2, and with incumbent Democratic Representatives Tom Chabin running for Arizona Senate and Albert Hale redistricted to District 7, Dalessandro ran in the August 28, 2012 Democratic Primary, placing first with 9,158 votes, and won the second seat in the November 6, 2012 General election with 27,081 votes above Republican nominee John Ackerly.
- 2008 When District 30 incumbent Republican Representatives Jonathan Paton ran for Arizona Senate and Marian McClure ran for the Arizona Corporation Commission, Dalessandro was unopposed in the September 2, 2008 Democratic Primary, winning with 11,871 votes, but placed third in the November 4, 2008 General election behind Republican nominees Frank Antenori and David Gowan (who had run for the seat in 2004 and 2006).
- 2010 To challenge incumbent Republican Representative Gowan, and with Representative Antenori running for Arizona Senate, Dalessandro was again unopposed for the August 24, 2010 Democratic Primary, placing second with 14,718 votes, and placed third in the November 2, 2010 General election behind Republican nominees Representative Gowan and Ted Vogt.
- 2014 Dalessandro was appointed to the Arizona State Senate to replace Linda J. Lopez, who resigned.
