= Arizona's 2nd legislative district =

American legislative district

- Map of District 2: Approved January 21, 2022
- Senator: Shawnna Bolick (R)
- House members: Stephanie Simacek (D); Justin Wilmeth (R)
- Registration: 36.01% Republican; 27.97% Democratic; 35.10% Other
- Demographics: 61% White; 5% Black/African American; 2% Native American; 7% Asian; 23% Hispanic
- Population: 246,674
- Registered voters: 133,388

Arizona's 2nd legislative district is one of 30 legislative districts in the U.S. state of Arizona. It encompasses a portion of Maricopa County, including communities in North Phoenix.

The district is represented in the 57th Arizona State Legislature by Shawnna Bolick (R) in the Arizona Senate and by Justin Wilmeth (R) and Stephanie Simacek (D) in the Arizona House of Representatives.

According to the Arizona Independent Redistricting Commission (AIRC), District 2 is highly competitive. Following the 2020 United States census, the district had a total population of 246,674.

== Political representation ==
=== Arizona Senate ===
Name	Party	Term	Legislature	Notes
District created January 22, 1970
Thomas M. Knoles Jr.	Democratic	1963–1972	30th	(Note: Knoles previously served in the 26th and 27th Legislatures as one of 2 state senators representing Coconino County and in the 28th and 29th Legislatures as the sole state senator representing Coconino County.)
Tony Gabaldon	Democratic	1973–1976; 1979–1990	31st 32nd 34th 35th 36th 37th 38th 39th	
Lewis J. McDonald	Democratic	1977–1978	33rd	
Karan English	Democratic	1991–1992	40th	
John Wettaw	Republican	1993–2000	41st 42nd 43rd 44th	
John Verkamp	Republican	2001–2002	45th	
Jack Jackson Sr.	Democratic	2003–2004	46th	
Albert Hale	Democratic	2005–2010	47th 48th 49th	
Jack Jackson Jr.	Democratic	2011–2012	50th	
Linda Lopez	Democratic	2013–2014	51st	
Andrea Dalessandro	Democratic	2015–2020	52nd 53rd 54th	
Rosanna Gabaldón	Democratic	2021–2022	55th	
Steve Kaiser	Republican	2023	56th	(Note: Resigned June 16, 2023.)
Shawnna Bolick	Republican	since 2023	56th 57th	(Note: Appointed to fill Kaiser's seat on July 21, 2023. Re-elected in 2024.)

=== Arizona House of Representatives ===
Name	Party	Term	Legislature	Notes
District created January 22, 1970
Sam A. McConnell Jr.	Republican	1967–1986	30th 31st 32nd 33rd 34th 35th 36th 37th	(Note: McConnell Jr. previously served in the 28th and 29th Arizona State Legislature as one of 2 state representatives representing Coconino County.)
Harold L. Huffer	Democratic	1967–1972	30th	(Note: Huffer previously served in the 28th and 29th Arizona State Legislature as one of 2 state representatives representing Coconino County.)
John Wettaw	Republican	1973–1992	31st 32nd 33rd 34th 35th 36th 37th 38th 39th 40th	
Karan English	Democratic	1987–1990	38th 39th	
Ben Benton	Republican	1991–1992	40th	
Joe Hart	Republican	1993–2000	41st 42nd 43rd 44th	
John Verkamp	Republican	1993–2000	41st 42nd 43rd 44th	
Tom O'Halleran	Republican	2001–2002	45th	
James Sedillo	Democratic	2001–2002	45th	
Jack Jackson Jr.	Democratic	2003–2004	46th	
Sylvia Laughter	Independent	2003–2004	46th	(Note: Elected to the House as a Democrat. Changed her party affiliation on February 4, 2003.)
Albert Tom	Democratic	2005–2008	47th 48th	
Ann Kirkpatrick	Democratic	2005–2006	47th	
Tom Chabin	Democratic	2007–2012	48th 49th 50th	
Chris Deschene	Democratic	2009–2010	49th	
Albert Hale	Democratic	2011–2012	50th	
Rosanna Gabaldón	Democratic	2013–2020	51st 52nd 53rd 54th	
Andrea Dalessandro	Democratic	2013–2014; 2021–2022	51st 55th	
J. Christopher Ackerley	Republican	2015–2016	52nd	
Daniel Hernández Jr.	Democratic	2017–2022	53rd 54th 55th	
Justin Wilmeth	Republican	since 2023	56th 57th	
Judy Schwiebert	Democratic	2023–2024	56th	
Stephanie Simacek	Democratic	since 2025	57th	

== Election results (since 2022) ==
Following the 2020 United States redistricting cycle, the AIRC redrew legislative district boundaries in Arizona. The 2022 elections were the first held in the newly redrawn District 2.

=== Arizona Senate ===
2026 Arizona Senate election, 2nd district
Party	Candidate	Votes	%
Democratic	Amelia Gallitano		
Republican	Shawnna Bolick (incumbent)		
Democratic gain from Republican			

2024 Arizona Senate election, 2nd district
Party	Candidate	Votes	%
Republican	Shawnna Bolick (incumbent) (Note: Bolick was appointed to fill the seat after Kaiser's resignation in 2023.)	52,100	50.82
Democratic	Judy Schwiebert	48,333	47.15
Green	Dennis Pugsley	2,076	2.03
Total votes		106,276	100.00
Republican hold			

2022 Arizona Senate election, 2nd district
Party	Candidate	Votes	%
Republican	Steve Kaiser	41,623	51.84
Democratic	Jeanne Casteen	38,666	48.16
Total votes		80,289	100.00
Republican gain from Democratic			

=== Arizona House of Representatives ===
2026 Arizona House of Representatives election, 2nd district
Party	Candidate	Votes	%
Democratic	Stephanie Simacek (incumbent)		
Republican	Justin Wilmeth (incumbent)		
Republican	Paul Carver		
Democratic hold			
Republican hold			

2024 Arizona House of Representatives election, 2nd district
Party	Candidate	Votes	%
Democratic	Stephanie Simacek	47,801	30.35
Republican	Justin Wilmeth (incumbent)	46,942	29.80
Republican	Ari Daniel Bradshaw	46,810	29.72
Independent	Tom Simes	15,946	10.13
Total votes		157,499	100.00
Democratic hold			
Republican hold			

2022 Arizona House of Representatives election, 2nd district
Party	Candidate	Votes	%
Democratic	Judy Schwiebert	40,130	35.17
Republican	Justin Wilmeth	37,977	33.29
Republican	Christian Lamar	35,987	31.54
Total votes		114,094	100.00
Democratic hold			
Republican gain from Democratic			

== Election results (2012–2021) ==
Following the 2010 United States redistricting cycle, the AIRC redrew legislative district boundaries in Arizona. District 2 encompassed the entirety of Santa Cruz County and a portion of southern Pima County, including the communities of Sahuarita, Green Valley, Nogales, and South Tucson. The 2012 elections were the first held in the newly drawn District 2.

=== Arizona Senate ===
2020 Arizona Senate election, 2nd district
Party	Candidate	Votes	%
Democratic	Rosanna Gabaldón	52,333	61.00
Republican	Mark Workman	33,463	39.00
Total votes		85,796	100.00
Democratic hold			

2018 Arizona Senate election, 2nd district
Party	Candidate	Votes	%
Democratic	Andrea Dalessandro (incumbent)	36,893	59.68
Republican	Shelley Kais	24,925	40.32
Total votes		61,818	100.00
Democratic hold			

2016 Arizona Senate election, 2nd district
Party	Candidate	Votes	%
Democratic	Andrea Dalessandro (incumbent)	39,693	59.46
Republican	Shelley Kais	27,066	40.54
Total votes		66,759	100.00
Democratic hold			

2014 Arizona Senate election, 2nd district
Party	Candidate	Votes	%
Democratic	Andrea Dalessandro	22,901	55.04
Republican	Daniel Estrella	18,707	44.96
Total votes		41,608	100.00
Democratic hold			

2012 Arizona Senate election, 2nd district
Party	Candidate	Votes	%
Democratic	Linda Lopez	39,590	96.91
Republican	Don Woolley (write-in)	1,263	3.09
Total votes		41,608	100.00
Democratic hold			

=== Arizona House of Representatives ===
2020 Arizona House of Representatives election, 2nd district
Party	Candidate	Votes	%
Democratic	Daniel Hernandez Jr. (incumbent)	46,467	37.26
Democratic	Andrea Dalessandro	44,296	35.52
Republican	Deborah McEwen	33,956	27.22
Total votes		124,719	100.00
Democratic hold			
Democratic hold			

2018 Arizona House of Representatives election, 2nd district
Party	Candidate	Votes	%
Democratic	Daniel Hernandez Jr. (incumbent)	30,613	29.28
Democratic	Rosanna Gabaldón (incumbent)	30,481	29.15
Republican	J. Christopher Ackerley	21,927	20.97
Republican	Anthony Sizer	21,543	20.60
Total votes		104,564	100.00
Democratic hold			
Democratic hold			

2016 Arizona House of Representatives election, 2nd district
Party	Candidate	Votes	%
Democratic	Daniel Hernandez Jr.	32,651	34.86
Democratic	Rosanna Gabaldón (incumbent)	32,495	34.70
Republican	J. Christopher Ackerley (incumbent)	28,506	30.44
Total votes		93,652	100.00
Democratic hold			
Democratic gain from Republican			

2014 Arizona House of Representatives election, 2nd district
Party	Candidate	Votes	%
Democratic	Rosanna Gabaldón (incumbent)	21,200	36.59
Republican	J. Christopher Ackerley	19,656	33.93
Democratic	Demion Clinco	17,080	29.48
Total votes		57,936	100.00
Democratic hold			
Republican gain from Democratic			

2012 Arizona House of Representatives election, 2nd district
Party	Candidate	Votes	%
Democratic	Andrea Dalessandro	28,266	35.77
Democratic	Rosanna Gabaldón	27,081	34.27
Republican	J. Christopher Ackerley	23,677	29.96
Total votes		79,024	100.00
Democratic hold			
Democratic hold			

== See also ==
- List of Arizona legislative districts
- Arizona State Legislature
