= Amelia Gallitano =

American politician

Member-elect of the Arizona Senate from the 2nd district
- Assuming office January 2027
- Succeeding: Shawnna Bolick

Personal details
- Party: Democratic

Amelia Gallitano is an American politician. A member of the Democratic Party, she is the member-elect for the 2nd district of the Arizona Senate.
