= Stephanie Simacek =

American politician and educator

Member of the Arizona House of Representatives
- Incumbent
- Assumed office January 13, 2025 Serving with Justin Wilmeth
- Preceded by: Judy Schwiebert
- Constituency: 2nd District

Personal details
- Party: Democratic
- Website: https://www.simacekforaz.com/

Stephanie Simacek is an American politician and educator serving as a member of the Arizona House of Representatives from the 2nd district. She is also a member of the Deer Valley Unified School District board, elected in 2023. She used to be a teacher in the district.
