= John Allen (Arizona politician) =

American politician

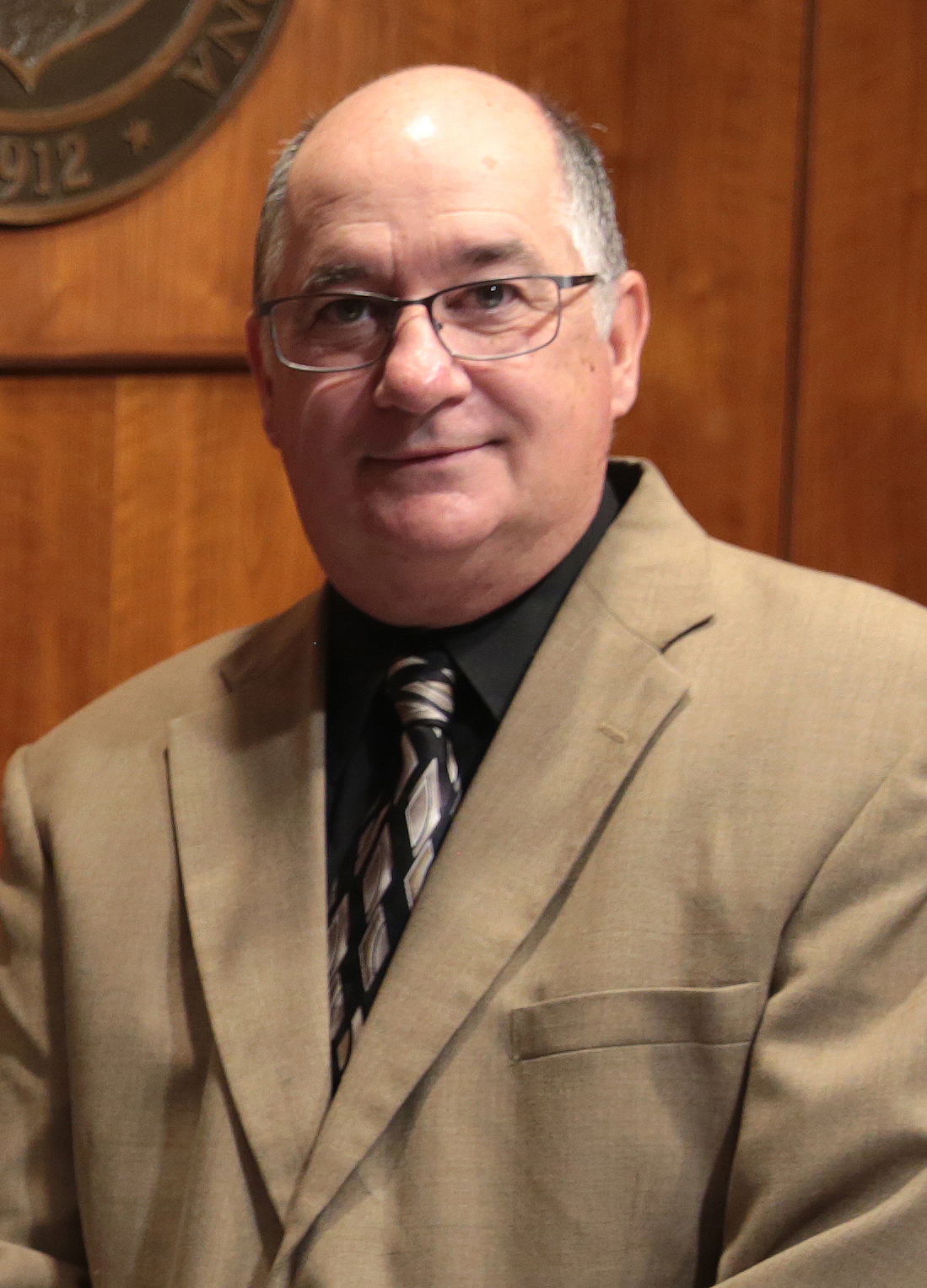
- Allen in 2017

County Treasurer of Maricopa County
- Incumbent
- Assumed office January 11, 2021
- Preceded by: Royce Flora

Majority Leader of the Arizona House of Representatives
- In office January 9, 2017 – January 14, 2019
- Preceded by: Steve Montenegro
- Succeeded by: Warren Petersen

Member of the Arizona House of Representatives from the 15th district
- In office January 14, 2013 – January 11, 2021 Serving with Nancy Barto
- Preceded by: Katie Hobbs
- Succeeded by: Steve Kaiser

Member of the Arizona House of Representatives from the 11th district
- In office January 2003 – January 2005 Serving with Stephen Tully
- Preceded by: Deb Gullett
- Succeeded by: Adam Driggs

Member of the Arizona House of Representatives from the 7th district
- In office January 2001 – January 2003 Serving with Ray Barnes
- Preceded by: ???
- Succeeded by: David Burnell Smith

Personal details
- Born: Long Island, New York, U.S.
- Party: Republican
- Education: Arizona State University, Tempe (BA)
- Website: Official website

John M. Allen (born in Long Island, New York) is an American politician and who currently serves as the County Treasurer for Maricopa County. A Republican, Allen was a member of the Arizona House of Representatives representing District 15 from January 2013 until 2021. Allen previously served non-consecutively from January 2001 until January 2005 in the District 7 and 11 seats.

== Education ==
Allen graduated from Arizona State University with a degree in business administration.

== Elections ==
- 2000 – To challenge incumbent Republican Representatives Carolyn Allen and Wes Marsh for the District 28 seat, Allen ran in the four-way September 12, 2000 Republican Primary, placing third behind them; they went on to win the November 7, 2000 General election, and Carolyn Allen later served in the Arizona Senate.
- 2002 – Redistricted to District 7, and with incumbent Democratic Representatives Cheryl Chase and Mark A. Clark redistricted to District 23, Allen ran in the six-way September 10, 2002 Republican Primary, placing first with 3,424 votes, and won the first seat in the three-way November 5, 2002 General election with 24,138 votes above fellow Republican Ray Barnes and Democratic nominee Virgel Cain; Barnes served in the seat from 2003 until 2011.
- 2004 – Switching to District 11, and with incumbent Republican Representative Deb Gullett departing the Legislature, Allen ran alongside Stephen Tully in the four-way September 7, 2004 Republican Primary, placing second with 8,454 votes, and won the second seat in the November 2, 2004 General election with 44,054 votes above Libertarian candidates Garry Myers and James Iannuzo.
- 2006 – With Republican Representative Stephen Tully departing the Legislature, Allen ran in the four-way September 12, 2006 Republican Primary, placing third behind Adam Driggs and Don Hesselbrock, Driggs and Democratic nominee Mark Desimone won the district's seats in the November 7, 2006 General election; Driggs later served in the Arizona Senate.
- 2008 – Running for one of the three seats up for election on the Arizona Corporation Commission, Allen ran in the eight-way September 2, 2008 Republican Primary, placing fourth behind Bob Stump, former state Representative Marian McClure, and Barry Wong; in the November 4, 2008 General election, Democratic former state Senator Sandra Kennedy placed first, Democratic former state Representative Paul Newman placed second, and Stump took the third seat.
- 2012 – Running in District 15, with incumbent Democratic Representatives Katie Hobbs running for Arizona Senate and Lela Alston redistricted to District 24, and with incumbent Republican Representative David Smith redistricted from District 7, Allen ran in the four-way August 28, 2012 Republican Primary, placing second with 7,813 votes, and Smith placed third. Allen won the second seat in the November 6, 2012 General election with 46,612 votes above Democratic nominee Patricia Flickner.

== Controversy ==
- Education - Allen is a vocal opponent of higher pay for teachers. In 2017, while Arizona was facing massive teacher shortages, and the state's teachers were among the lowest paid in the nation, Allen said that teachers should get second jobs to supplement their income.
- Election Integrity - Allen is opposed to election integrity and reform. In 2019, while in a caucus meeting, Allen asked a fellow politician "Can we virtually shoot the head of Clean Elections?" Prompting a response from the Chairman of Arizona Clean Elections, Mark Kimble: "It is deeply troubling - particularly to those of us from Tucson - to joke about shooting someone in the head because of a policy difference. That is not funny. Reps. Allen and Payne owe an apology to all Arizonans for thinking it is appropriate to jest about shooting people in the head," [...] "The comments by Reps. Allen and Payne go far beyond being disagreeable. They are shameful and disgusting.".

Arizona House of Representatives
Preceded by Steve Montenegro	Majority Leader of the Arizona House of Representatives; 2017–2019	Succeeded by Warren Petersen
