= Justin Wilmeth =

American politician (born 1979)

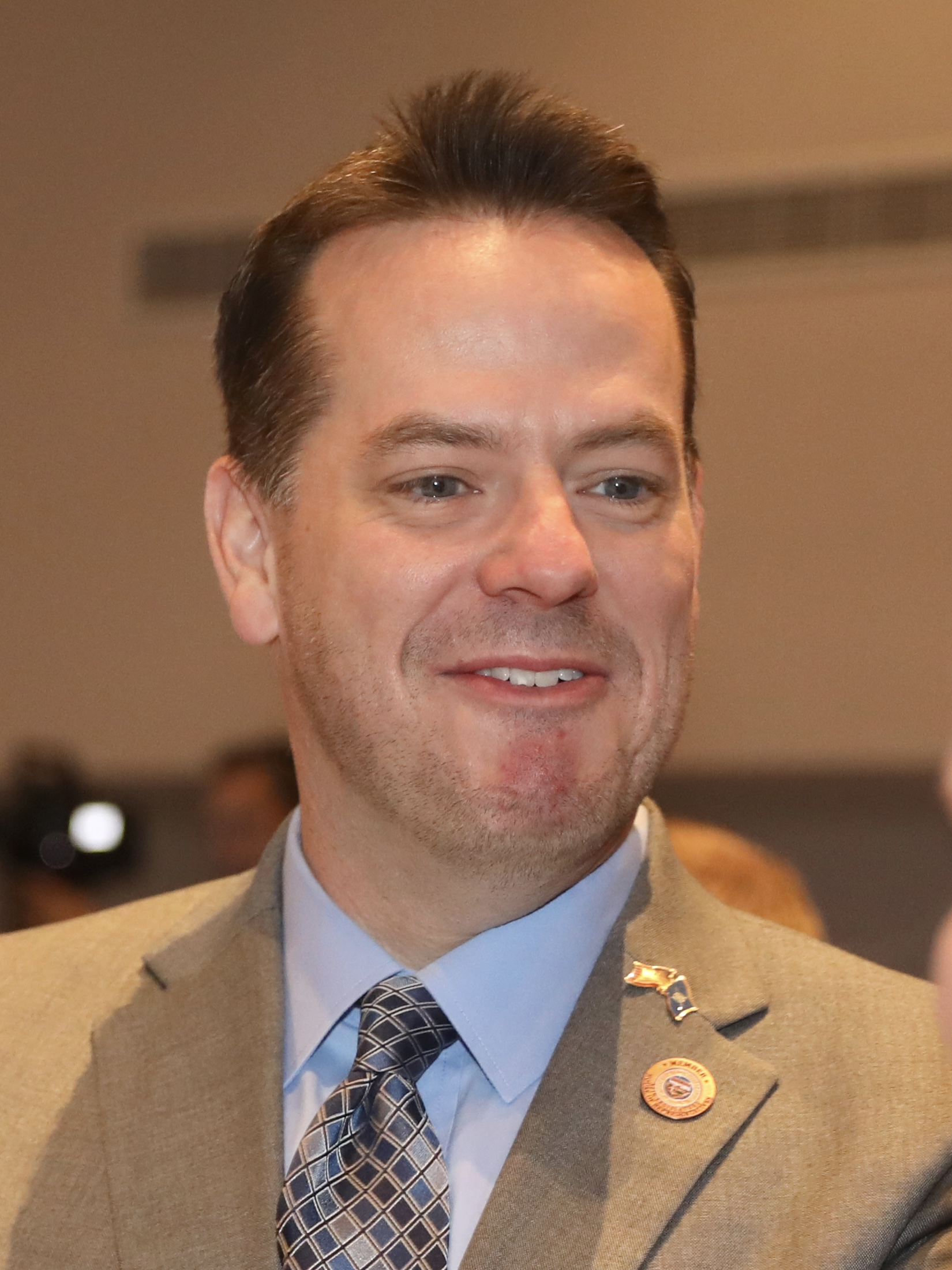
- Wilmeth in 2024

Member of the Arizona House of Representatives
- Incumbent
- Assumed office January 11, 2021 Serving with Stephanie Simacek
- Preceded by: Nancy Barto
- Constituency: 15th district (2021–2023); 2nd district (2023–present)

Personal details
- Born: June 26, 1979 (age 47)
- Party: Republican
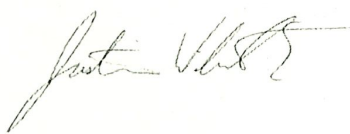
- Signature
- Website: Campaign website

Justin Wilmeth is an American politician and former child actor who has been a member of the Arizona House of Representatives since 2021. He is a member of the Republican Party. He was elected to the 15th district in 2020, and was subsequently elected from the 2nd district.

== Political career ==
Wilmer ran for a Legislative District 15 seat in the Arizona House of Representatives, in a distinct covering north Phoenix, after incumbent Republican Nancy Barto decided to run for Arizona Senate.

In 2020, Wilmeth and Steve Kaiser won the a two–seat election, defeating Democrat Kristin Dybvig–Pawelko. Following resdistricting, he was placed in Legislative District 2. Wilmeth was reelected in 2022. In the 2024, Democrat Stephanie Simacek came in first place in LD2; for the second seat, Wilmet and fellow Republican by Ari Daniel Bradshaw were separated by 0.08% in the initial count, triggering a recount. In the recount, Wilmeth had 46,943 votes (29.76%), edging out Bradshaw, who received 46,809 votes (29.68%).

In 2022, Wilmeth was named to the 2022 GOPAC Emerging Leaders Class.

In 2023-2024 session, Wilmeth was chairman of the House Commerce Committee. In 2024, Wilmeth sponsored a bill to designate dwarf planet Pluto as Arizona's state planet. (Pluto was discovered by astronomers at the Lowell Observatory in Flagstaff.) The bill passed the legislature and was signed into law by Governor Katie Hobbs.

Wilmeth supported Donald Trump in the 2024 presidential election.

In 2024, Wilmeth was one of three Republicans in the Arizona State House who voted to repeal Arizona's 1864 ban on abortion (adopted when Arizona was still a territory), a ban which contained no exceptions for rape or incest.
