= Paul Boyer (politician) =

American politician

Paul D. Boyer
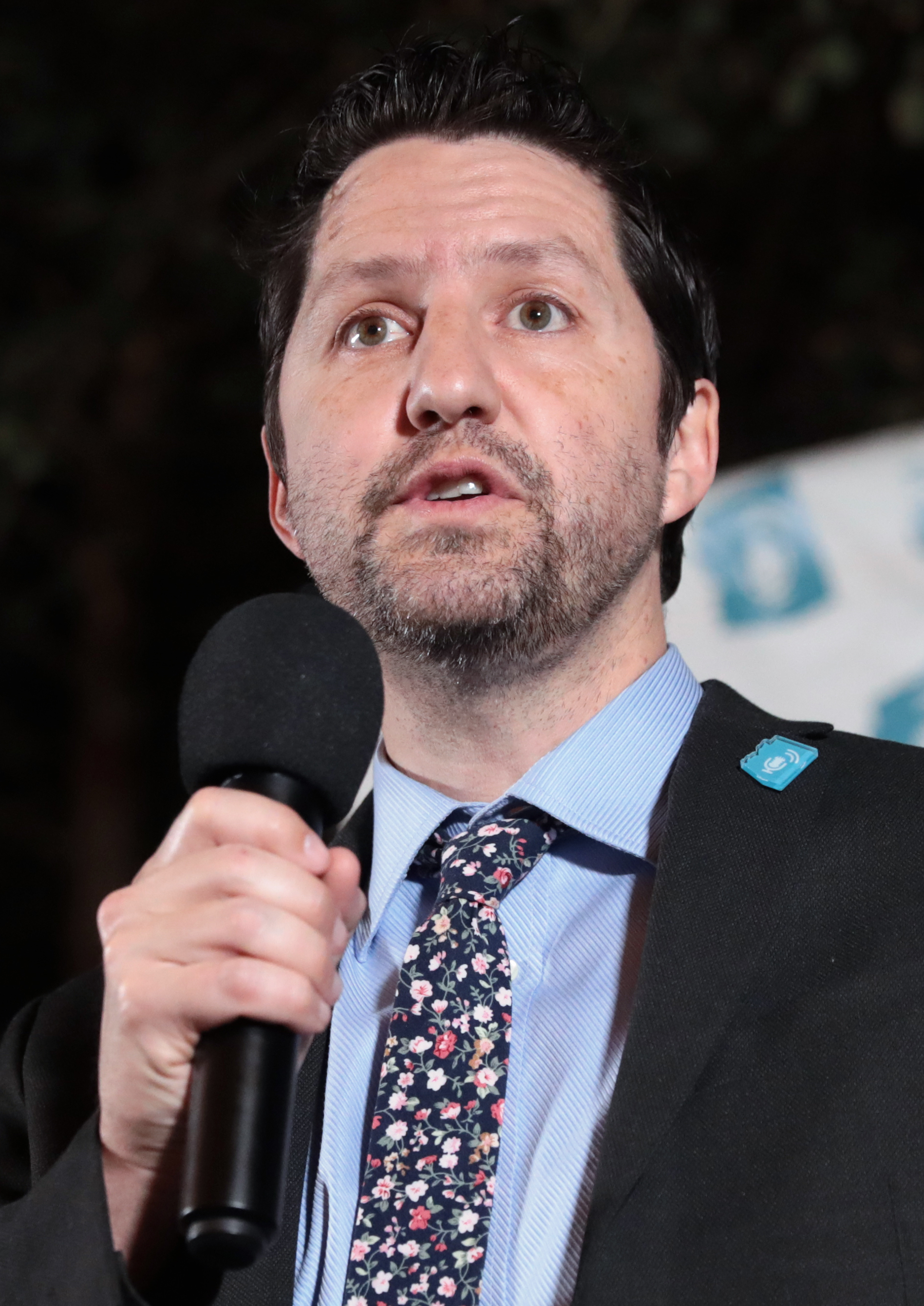
- Boyer in 2022

Member of the Arizona Senate from the 20th district
- In office January 14, 2019 – January 9, 2023
- Preceded by: Kimberly Yee
- Succeeded by: Steve Kaiser

Member of the Arizona House of Representatives from the 20th district
- In office January 14, 2013 – January 14, 2019 Serving with Anthony Kern
- Succeeded by: Shawnna Bolick

Personal details
- Party: Republican
- Spouse: Beth
- Education: Arizona State University West
- Website: boyeraz.com

Paul D. Boyer is an American politician and a former Republican member of the Arizona State Senate representing District 20 from 2019 to 2023. He previously served in the Arizona House of Representatives from 2013 to 2019, including serving as the Chair of the Arizona House Education Committee.

== Early life, education and career ==
Born to Fred and Sharon and a native of Arizona's West Valley, Boyer attended Deer Valley High School.

Boyer earned his bachelor's degree in English and his MA in communication studies from Arizona State University West. He previously taught at North Phoenix Preparatory Academy and Veritas Preparatory Academy. Both are part of the Great Hearts Academies.

Previously, Boyer served as an official spokesman and policy advisor for House Majority at the State Capitol, the legislative liaison for the Arizona Department of Corrections, and a spokesman for Mesa Public Schools.

== Political positions ==
=== Voting rights ===
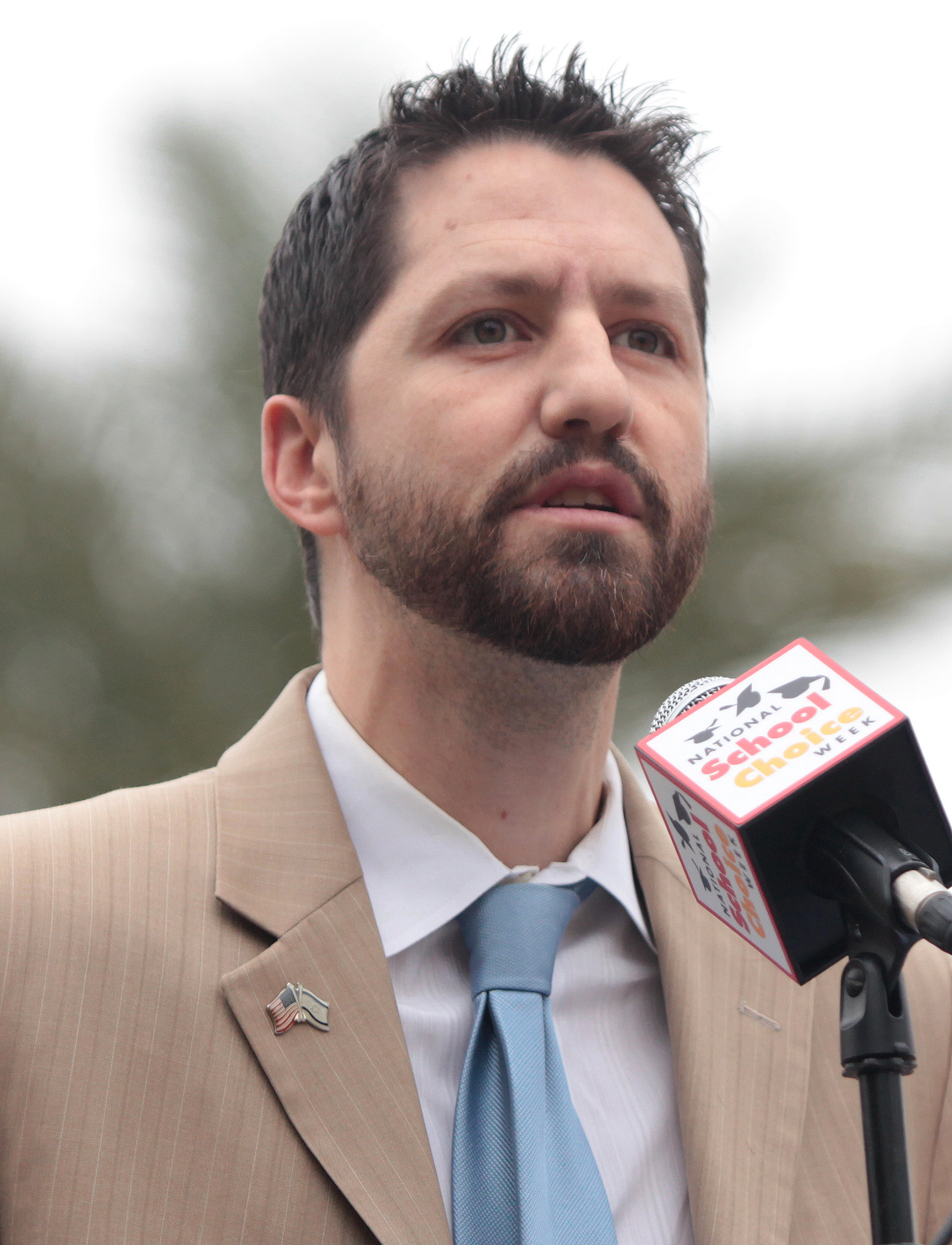
Boyer in 2015

In April 2021, Boyer voted to purge approximately 200,000 individuals from Arizona voter rolls because they had not voted in two consecutive election cycles. He had previously joined the Democrats in February 2021 in the Arizona Senate in blocking Michelle Ugenti-Rita's Senate Bill to purge the voter rolls.

In February 2021, Boyer was the only Republican that joined the Democratic caucus in the Arizona Senate to vote against holding the Maricopa County Board of Supervisors in contempt for not following a subpoena of the senate. The Senate had subpoenaed access to all voting machines and copies of all mail ballots in Maricopa County in a pursuit to prove allegations of widespread irregularities in the 2020 presidential elections. The Board of Supervisors believes that subpoena to be unlawful.

Boyer supported an audit into Arizona's election results in the 2020 presidential election, although two previous audits that were partial recounts did not find any fraud. After an audit was initiated, Boyer said that he was embarrassed by the audit and that "It makes us look like idiots." He went on and said “Looking back, I didn’t think it would be this ridiculous. It’s embarrassing to be a state senator at this point.”

In response to Boyer's criticisms of the audit, Trump called him a "RINO" and "nothing but trouble", and endorsed former Arizona State Representative Anthony Kern, who has announced plans to challenge Boyer in the Republican primary in 2022. In November 2021, Boyer announced he would retire at the end of his term rather than seeking re-election.

=== Guns ===
Boyer supports measures to limit gun control. In 2016, he introduced legislation to prevent the use of smart gun technology in Arizona. This technology adds additional safety measures that must be met in order for the gun to fire, such as fingerprint recognition or requiring the shooter to wear a special ring. He received an "A" rating from the NRA Political Victory Fund.

== Elections ==
- 2012: With incumbent Republican Representatives Jeff Dial and Bob Robson, redistricted to District 18, and with incumbent Republican Representative Carl Seel, redistricted from District 6, Boyer ran in the three-way August 28, 2012, Republican primary, placing first with 12,224 votes, and won the first seat in the November 6, 2012, general election with 37,143 votes, above incumbent Representative Seel and the Democratic nominees, former Representative Jackie Thrasher and Tonya Norwood.
- 2014: Boyer and Anthony Kern defeated Democrat Amy Schwabenlender on November 4. Boyer was the top vote-getter in the election with 25,610 votes.
- 2016: Boyer and Anthony Kern were unopposed in the Republican primary. They defeated Democrat Chris Gilfillan on November 8. Boyer was the top vote getter in the election with 39,780 votes.
- 2018: In the general election, Boyer defeated Democrat, Douglas Ervin, for a seat in Arizona's State Senate from District 20, by 35,170 votes to 32,352 votes.

== Electoral history ==
Year	Office	District	Republican		Democrat	
2018	Arizona Senate	District 20	Paul Boyer	35,170	Douglas Ervin	32,352
2016	Arizona House of Representatives	District 20	Paul Boyer	39,780	Chris Gilfillan	35,117
2014	Arizona House of Representatives	District 20	Paul Boyer	25,610	Amy Schwabenlender	19,779
2012	Arizona House of Representatives	District 20	Paul Boyer	37,143	Jackie Thrasher	30,342
