= Mark Finchem =

American politician (born 1957)

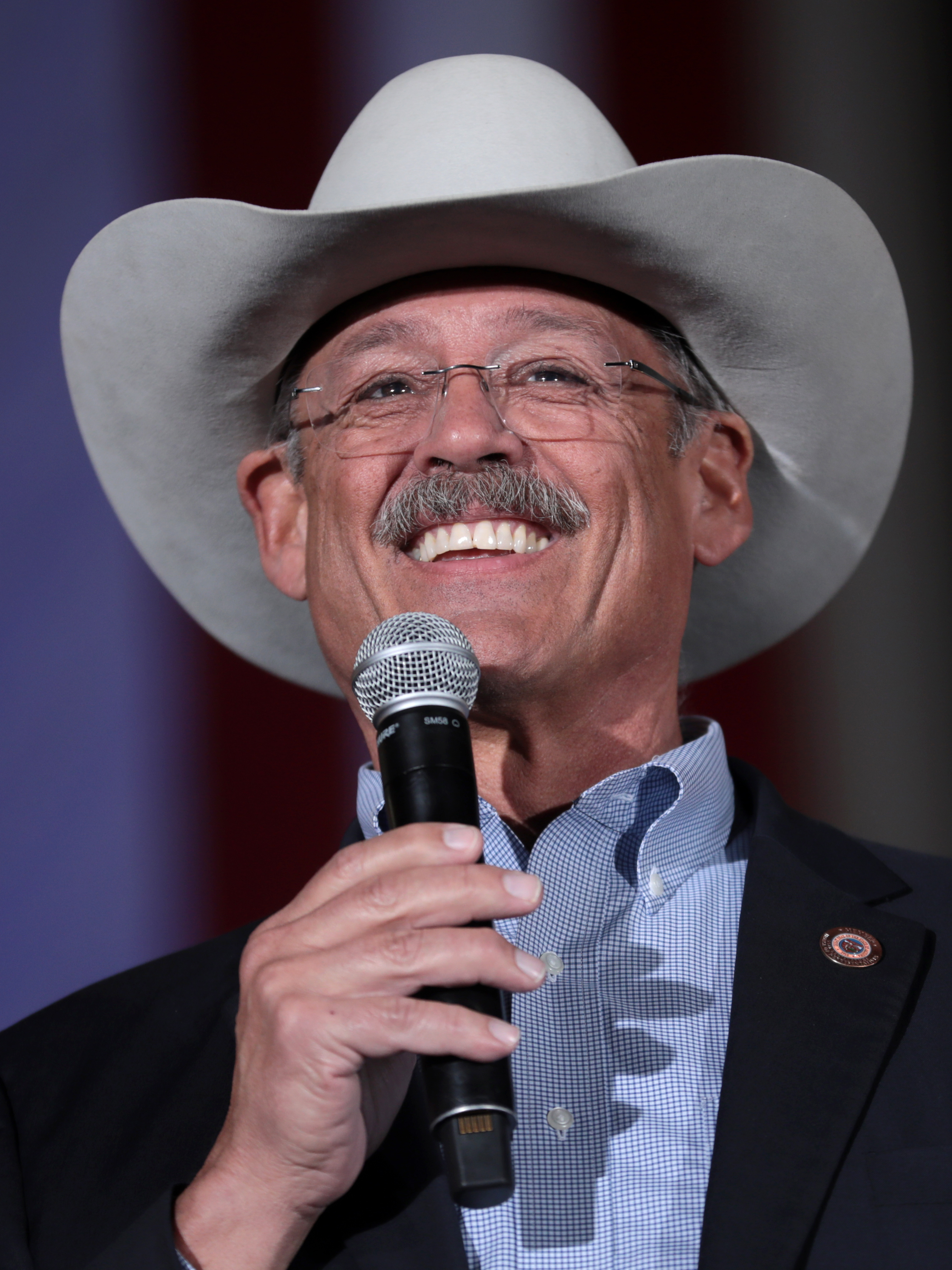
- Finchem in 2022

Member of the Arizona Senate from the 1st district
- Incumbent
- Assumed office January 13, 2025
- Preceded by: Ken Bennett

Member of the Arizona House of Representatives from the 11th district
- In office January 5, 2015 – January 9, 2023
- Preceded by: Adam Kwasman
- Succeeded by: Oscar De Los Santos

Personal details
- Born: Mark William Finchem; April 24, 1957 (age 69) Detroit, Michigan, U.S.
- Party: Republican
- Children: 3
- Education: Kalamazoo Valley Community College (AAS); Grand Canyon University (BA); University of Arizona (MLS)
- Website: Campaign website

Mark William Finchem (born April 24, 1957) is an American far-right politician who serves as a member of the Arizona Senate. He was previously a member of the Arizona House of Representatives, representing District 11 from 2015 to 2023. He is the Arizona coordinator for the Coalition of Western States, an organization that opposes the activities of the Bureau of Land Management and supported the occupation of the Malheur National Wildlife Refuge in 2016.

A member of the militia group Oath Keepers, Finchem was the Republican Party nominee in the 2022 election for Secretary of State of Arizona. In 2024, Finchem was elected to the Arizona Senate after defeating incumbent Ken Bennett in the Republican primary.

== Early life and education ==
Finchem was originally from the Detroit, Michigan area. After graduating high school, he joined the Kalamazoo, Michigan department of public safety, working first as a firefighter and then as a police officer. While a police officer, he also worked as a rancher. He received an associate of applied science degree from Kalamazoo Valley Community College. Finchem retired from the Kalamazoo Department of Public Safety in 1999; personnel records included the note "poor rating, would not rehire".

Finchem moved to Tucson, Arizona in 1999, and became a real estate agent. He later became vice president of Clean Power Technologies LLC, an Idaho-based company that claimed to generate and distribute sustainable energy "without wires, anywhere around the world". He allowed his real estate license to expire in 2021.

Finchem received a Bachelor of Arts (BA) in public policy from Grand Canyon University in 2019 and later a Master of Legal Studies (MLS) from the University of Arizona (UA). In a 2021 paper that he issued through his nonprofit, Finchem falsely claimed to be a "legislative fellow in residence" at UA's James E. Rogers College of Law; Finchem does not hold a fellowship at the law school.

== Political career ==
=== Arizona House of Representatives ===
Finchem was first elected to the Arizona House of Representatives in 2014, finishing second in the Republican primary behind Vince Leach before advancing to the general election in Arizona's top-two nominating process. Finchem and Leach ran successfully in the general election. Finchem came in first with 36,732 votes, ahead of Leach and Democratic challenger Holly Lyon.

Finchem and Leach defeated Democrats Corin Hammond and Barry McCain (write-in candidate) in the 2016 general election.

As a member of the state House, Finchem was known for promoting extreme ideas. In 2016, Finchem introduced legislation that would prohibit Arizona from implementing presidential executive orders, directives issued by federal agencies, and U.S. Supreme Court rulings. In 2019 he introduced a bill to create a code of ethics for teachers which consisted primarily of text from a report published by the David Horowitz Freedom Center. He also sponsored in 2019 a bill that would seek to transfer management of federal lands in Arizona to the state government.

In 2020, Finchem ran for speaker of the Arizona House of Representatives, challenging incumbent Republican Russell Bowers. Finchem said that if elected he would prioritize the development of viral content. He lost the speaker's election, receiving the support of less than one-third of the House Republican caucus.

Posting on Twitter in 2021, Finchem compared the cancellation of a fundraiser for Josh Hawley to the Holocaust. In the tweet, Finchem criticised Loews Hotels for cancelling the fundraiser, saying "This is what Hitler and Stalin did. What's next Camps? Ovens?"

As of 2021, Finchem was a member of the House of Representatives' committees on the Judiciary, on Military Affairs & Public Safety, and on Natural Resources, Energy & Water. He was granted a committee chairmanship only a single time in his eight years in the state House. He led the "Liberty Caucus" group of far-right Republican state House members. Republican state senator T. J. Shope described Finchem as a "political gadfly"'; another Republican state senator, Paul Boyer, described him as "one of the dumbest" members of the Arizona House of Representatives. (Finchem responded by calling Boyer an "utter disgrace"). Finchem's rise to prominence reflected a broader rightward shift within the Arizona Republican Party; in the late 2010s and 2020s, the strength of the wing of the party aligned with John McCain diminished, and the party apparatus became increasingly dominated by the far right.

=== Coalition of Western States ===
As of 2016, Finchem was Arizona coordinator of the Coalition of Western States (COWS), a group founded by Washington state representative Matt Shea in 2014 to support Cliven Bundy and his family in their confrontation with law enforcement, which also supported the 2016 occupation of the Malheur National Wildlife Refuge. Mark Pitcavage of the Anti-Defamation League described COWS as motivated by "anti-government extremism and anti-public lands extremism", and said that Finchem's membership indicated he shared extremist views.

=== 2022 Secretary of State campaign ===
In March 2021, Finchem announced he would run for Secretary of State of Arizona in the 2022 election. He received Donald Trump's endorsement in September 2021 and won the Republican primary on August 2, 2022. Finchem is a member of the America First Secretary of State Coalition. Finchem is a long-time affiliate with the Oath Keepers whose members donated almost $10,000 to his campaign.

During the election campaign, Finchem published a tweet calling Arizona Democratic politicians "liars and deceivers" whose "loyalty is to George Soros and Mike Bloomberg." Finchem's invocation of an antisemitic trope drew criticism. On his Telegram account, Finchem invoked Soros' name 24 times, often describing himself as combating the "Soros machine" or his "Soros funded opponent" or claiming that the media is Soros-funded.

Finchem was also scrutinized for his endorsement of Jarrin Jackson, a Republican candidate for Oklahoma State Senate known for his antisemitic and homophobic views (Jackson named "the Jews" as one of several groups that prove "evil exists" and said that "LGTBQ is the gateway to pedophilia"). After Jackson's writings were publicized, Arizona Republican gubernatorial nominee Kari Lake rescinded her endorsement of Jackson, but Finchem did not. Finchem also attracted scrutiny for receiving an endorsement from Andrew Torba, the founder of the antisemitic and white nationalist platform Gab, and for publicly welcoming Torba's endorsement. On his own Gab account, Finchem has pushed the Soros conspiracy theory, as well as claims that the Central Intelligence Agency controls the media.

Finchem's comments were criticized by Jewish organizations, including the Jewish Community Relations Council of Greater Phoenix. He responded to criticism saying he "loved the Jewish people" and denying that his tweet was anti-Semitic. He later doubled down on his initial claims, saying that criticism of him was proof of a Soros conspiracy.

During his campaign, most of Finchem's media appearances were on right-wing talk shows. He is a frequent guest on Steve Bannon's podcast.

Finchem had said that if he lost the election, he would not concede. Democratic nominee Adrian Fontes defeated Finchem in the November 8 general election.

=== Lawsuit to ban electronic voting machines ===
In April 2022, Finchem and Kari Lake sued state officials, seeking to ban electronic voting machines from being used in his 2022 election. In August 2022, U.S. District Judge John Tuchi dismissed the suit, writing that Lake and Finchem "articulated only conjectural allegations of potential injuries" and thus lacked standing. In his ruling, Tuchi also cited the Eleventh Amendment to the United States Constitution, as well as the Purcell principle. In December 2022, Tuchi sanctioned Lake's lawyers in this suit, including Alan Dershowitz, for making "false, misleading, and unsupported" assertions during the case, and making claims without "an adequate factual or legal basis grounded in a reasonable pre-filing inquiry"; he ordered the plaintiffs to pay the defendants' attorney fees. Tuchi said the sanctions would show that the court does not tolerate litigants "furthering false narratives that baselessly undermine public trust at a time of increasing disinformation about, and distrust in, the democratic process". The sanction amount was set by Tuchi to be roughly $122,000.

Finchem and Lake's appeal, aimed at banning electronic voting machines, was rejected in October 2022 by the United States Court of Appeals for the Ninth Circuit, which highlighted that "counsel for plaintiffs conceded that their arguments were limited to potential future hacking, and not based on any past harm", and voiced agreement "with the district court that plaintiffs' speculative allegations that voting machines may be hackable are insufficient to establish an injury". Finchem and Lake in March 2024 appealed to the United States Supreme Court, which rejected their lawsuit in April 2024.

=== Lawsuit to overturn his election loss ===
Finchem filed a lawsuit in December 2022 to have the election "nullified and redone," but it was dismissed with prejudice that month by Maricopa County Superior Court judge Melissa Julian, confirming Democrat Adrian Fontes' victory, as well as the victory of Democrat Katie Hobbs over Republican Kari Lake who had also filed suit to overturn the election.

Among other issues, the judge rejected the merits of Finchem's arguments on voting machines certification and voting software certification, and separately concluded that Finchem "does not allege that any of the votes cast were actually illegal" and does not allege that any legal vote was not counted, but only alleged "suspicions that some votes may not have been counted", which was insufficient to overturn an election. The judge also rejected Finchem's allegations of "misconduct" by Secretary of State Katie Hobbs as insufficient.

Judge Julian in March 2023 sanctioned Finchem and his lawyer to pay the legal fees of Fontes' campaign and office because Finchem's lawsuit was "groundless and not brought in good faith." The judge noted that a supposed expert called by Finchem asserted that there were "missing votes", but the number of "missing votes" claimed was not enough to change the result of the election. The judge cited Finchem's decision not to inspect ballots as indicating that Finchem "had no expectation that an inspection would yield a favorable outcome", which further "demonstrates that Finchem challenged his election loss despite knowing that his claims regarding misconduct and procedural irregularities were insufficient under the law to sustain the contest." Finchem reacted to the sanctions by calling for Judge Julian to be "removed from the bench for her abuse of judicial authority". In May 2023, Judge Julian ruled that the amount of legal fees and costs that Finchem is to pay to Fontes is $40,565.

Finchem appealed the rejection of his election challenge, then abandoned the appeal in July 2023, with his lawyer citing other failed 2022 election challenging lawsuits in Arizona; however Finchem continued to appeal the sanctions against him in this case. In November 2024, the Arizona Supreme Court rejected Finchem's appeal against his sanctions, thus Finchem was required to pay Fontes' legal fees.

=== 2024 Arizona State Senate campaign ===
In 2024, Finchem challenged and defeated incumbent Arizona State Senator Ken Bennett in the Republican primary election for Arizona's 1st legislative district. He later won the general election.

== Views and positions ==
Finchem's political views and positions align with the far-right in the United States.

=== Abortion ===
Finchem is opposed to abortion. As a state representative, he voted to ban all abortions after 15 weeks of pregnancy, with an exception where the life of the mother is at stake.

=== Response to the 2020 presidential election ===
Following the 2020 United States presidential election, Finchem supported Donald Trump's false claim to have won the election nationally and in Arizona. On the same day that Joe Biden's victory in Arizona was certified by state election officials, Finchem met with Trump's lawyer Rudy Giuliani to discuss the election; he has repeatedly claimed, without evidence, that the election was "stolen" from Trump. Finchem has promoted the "independent state legislature theory"; after Biden's victory in 2020, he called for the Arizona legislature to appoint presidential electors of its own choosing. Finchem promoted the then-fringe theory before it gained currency among mainstream Republicans.

In 2021, Finchem shared on social media a "report" falsely claiming to have uncovered tens of thousands of missing or lost votes, and tens of thousands of votes fraudulently cast, in Maricopa County, Arizona. The report was based on extrapolations from a non-random sample of a much smaller number of voters and was rejected by county elections officials and political scientists. In 2022, two years after the election, Finchem introduced a resolution in the state legislature to "reclaim" Arizona's electors on the basis of his false claim that the results in three Arizona counties were "irredeemably compromised"; the resolution did not receive a hearing in the House.

A business affiliated with Finchem, Mrk Finchem PLLC [sic], received $6,037 from the Trump reelection campaign. The payment was first reported upon in February 2021. Finchem said the payment was for security costs related to his meeting with Giuliani.

Finchem has advocated for banning mail-in voting. In a September 2022 debate, Finchem said, "I don't care for mail-in voting. That's why I go to the polls." However, Finchem voted by mail 28 times between 2004 and 2020 in Pima County, Arizona.

==== 2021 U.S. Capitol attack ====
Finchem traveled to Washington, D.C. to take part in the January 6, 2021, protest that was followed by an attack on the U.S. Capitol. He claimed, without offering any evidence, that "this election was a fraud", and tweeted photographs of protestors massed on the steps of the Capitol building. Finchem later claimed that leftists had instigated the violence. He was later interviewed as a witness by the Justice Department and the House committee investigating the Capitol riots.

A coalition of community organizations subsequently called for the expulsion of Finchem and six other Arizona Republican lawmakers who advocated overturning the 2020 election. In response to a Federal Bureau of Investigation (FBI) briefing that said antifa groups were not involved in the attack on the Capitol, Finchem said he did not "trust a word that comes out of the FBI's mouth".

=== Promotion of other conspiracy theories ===
In 2013, Finchem argued that Barack Obama was seeking to establish a "totalitarian dictatorship." On his Pinterest account, Finchem kept a "Treason Watch List" with photos of prominent Democrats, including Jesse Jackson, Janet Napolitano, and John Kerry; he also posted about stockpiling ammunition.

In 2017, Finchem baselessly described the white supremacist Unite the Right rally as a "deep state psyop" carried out by Democrats. He endorses a variant of the Great Replacement conspiracy theory.

During his 2022 campaign for Arizona secretary of state, Finchem toured with fringe figures. He embraced QAnon conspiracy theories, and attended a conference of QAnon followers that opened with a video trafficking in antisemitism and repeating debunked conspiracy theories. Finchem also attended a Newport Beach, California fundraiser, promoted by ex-Trump advisors Steve Bannon and Michael Flynn, with Nicole Nogrady, a conspiracy theorist who claimed that fetal tissue was in the food supply and that the September 11 attacks were a federal government plot. In August 2022, he attended a Wisconsin gathering of the "Church Militant" movement, a self-proclaimed "Christian militia" that says that it combats "sin, the devil and the demonic rulers of the darkness of this world."

In October, Finchem tweeted that Google's search algorithm was biased against his campaign because its website did not come up in searches on his name. Grid, a tech news website, confirmed Finchem's site did not appear in Google results, but Google apparently had nothing to do with it. Instead, the noindex tag, which tells webcrawlers not to list the site in results, was present in the metatag of the site's HTML code. Whether that was the result of an error in coding the page was not known; the tag had apparently been added to it in late July. Finchem did not respond to Grid's request for an explanation when they called him.

== Personal life ==
Finchem has been married four times, and has been estranged for over two decades from two adult children and has not met his grandchildren by them, according to family members. He also has two stepchildren.
