= Ray Barnes =

American politician

Member of the Arizona House of Representatives from the 7th district
- In office January 2003 – January 2011
- Succeeded by: Heather Carter; David Burnell Smith

Personal details
- Party: Republican
- Profession: Politician

Ray Barnes was a member of the Arizona House of Representatives from 2003 through 2011. He was first elected to the House in November 2002, and was re-elected three times, in 2004, 2006, and 2008. He was ineligible to run again in 2010 due to Arizona's term limits.
