= Judy Schwiebert =

American politician and educator

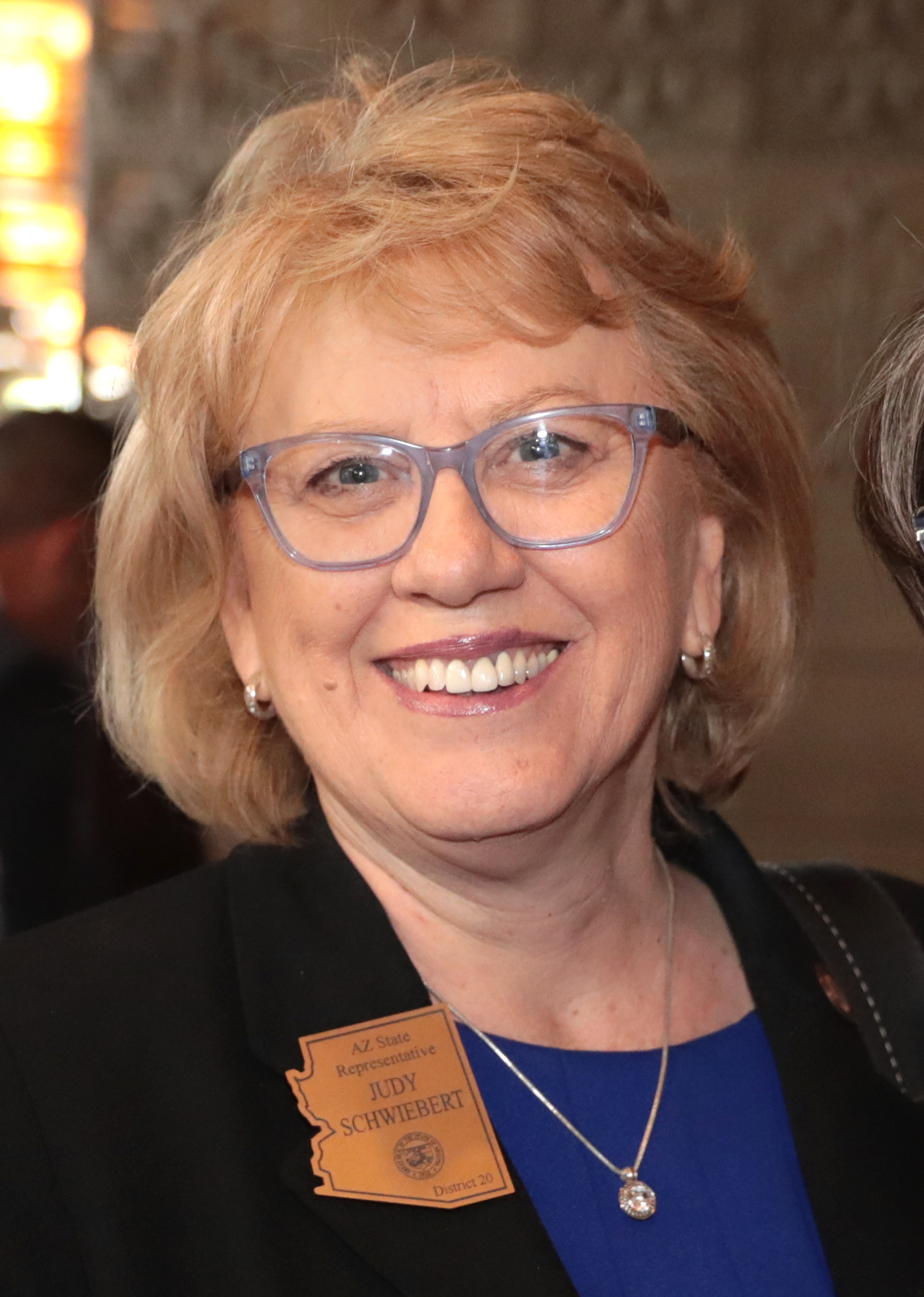
- Schwiebert in 2022

Member of the Arizona House of Representatives
- In office January 11, 2021 – January 13, 2025
- Preceded by: Anthony Kern
- Succeeded by: Stephanie Simacek
- Constituency: 20th district (2021–2023); 2nd district (2023–present)

Personal details
- Born: 1951 or 1952 (age 73–74)
- Party: Democratic
- Education: Arizona State University, Tempe (BA); University of Ottawa (MA)

Judy Schwiebert (born 1951/1952) is an American politician, educator, and a former member of the Arizona House of Representatives from the 2nd district. Elected in 2020 to the 20th district, she assumed office on January 11, 2021. She ran for reelection in 2022 for the 2nd district, as a result of redistricting. In 2024, she ran for the State Senate, but lost in the general election.

== Early life and education ==
Schwiebert was raised in Phoenix, Arizona. She earned a Bachelor of Arts in Education degree in English from Arizona State University and a Master of Arts in Education in library science from the University of Ottawa.

== Career ==
For 27 years, Schwiebert worked as a teacher in the Glendale Union High School District and Peoria Unified School District. She is the co-founder of Theater Works, a non-profit education organization based in Glendale, Arizona. Schwiebert was elected to the Arizona House of Representatives in 2020. She assumed office on January 11, 2021, succeeding Republican incumbent Anthony Kern. In 2024, she ran for State Senate but lost in the general election to incumbent State Senator Shawnna Bolick.
