= Steve Kaiser =

American politician

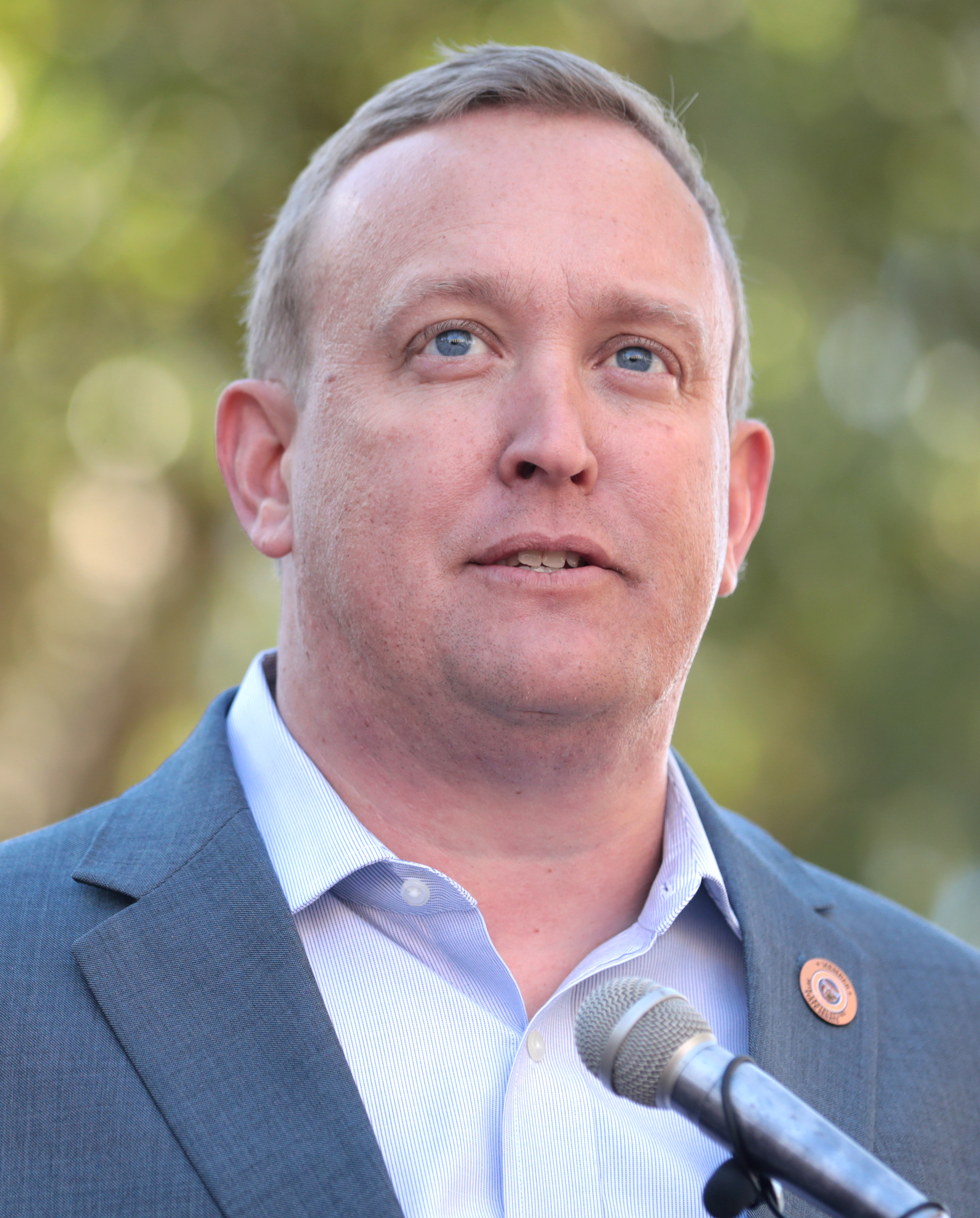
- Kaiser in 2023

Member of the Arizona Senate from the 2nd district
- In office January 9, 2023 – June 16, 2023
- Preceded by: Paul Boyer
- Succeeded by: Shawnna Bolick

Member of the Arizona House of Representatives from the 15th District
- In office January 11, 2021 – January 9, 2023
- Preceded by: John Allen
- Succeeded by: Jacqueline Parker

Personal details
- Party: Republican
- Education: Arizona State University

Military service
- Allegiance: United States
- Branch/service: United States Army
- Rank: Captain

Steve Kaiser is an American politician. He was a Republican member of the Arizona Senate in 2023. He previously served as state representative in Arizona's 15th district. He was elected to the seat after incumbent Republican John Allen decided to run for Maricopa County treasurer. He and Justin Wilmeth won in a two–seat election in 2020, both defeating Democrat Kristin Dybvig–Pawelko by over 11,000 votes. While in the State House, he introduced bipartisan legislation on housing reform.

== State Senate (2023) ==
In 2022, Kaiser ran for and was elected to the State Senate. He defeated his opponent, Democrat Jeanne Casteen, by nearly 4%.

In 2023, Kaiser was part of a bipartisan effort to address rising housing costs in Arizona. He introduced two bills aimed at deregulation, zoning, and property rights for developers that would lower the cost of living for Arizonans.

On June 14, 2023, Kaiser announced via a text message to a local political reporter that he will be resigning to focus on his 501(c)(4) – the Arizona Prosperity Project. He officially resigned from office on June 16, 2023.
