= David Burnell Smith =

American politician

Member of the Arizona House of Representatives from the 7th district
- In office January 2005 – January 2006
- Preceded by: John Allen
- Succeeded by: Nancy Barto

Member of the Arizona House of Representatives from the 7th district
- In office January 2011 – January 2013
- Preceded by: Nancy Barto
- Succeeded by: John Allen (in district 15 after redistricting)

Personal details
- Born: April 8, 1941 Charleston, West Virginia
- Died: October 24, 2014 (aged 73) Carefree, Arizona
- Party: Republican
- Spouse: Rita J. Smith
- Education: University of Charleston (B.A.–1967); University of Baltimore (J.D.–1972); University of Nevada-Reno (M.J.–1995)
- Profession: Lawyer, politician

David Burnell Smith was a Republican member of the Arizona House of Representatives, representing Arizona Legislative District 7. He served in the House from January 2005 until January 2006, and again from January 2011 until January 2013. He ran unsuccessfully for re-election in November 2014. Smith died of natural causes at his home in Carefree, Arizona on October 24, 2014.

== Biography ==
Smith was born in Charleston, West Virginia on April 8, 1941. After graduating from Charleston High School, Smith served in the United States Coast Guard from 1959 to 1967. He received his B.A. from the University of Charleston (then known as Morris Harvey College) in 1967, where he was a member and officer in Tau Kappa Epsilon fraternity. Smith and his wife, Rita, moved to Arizona in 1993. He ran unsuccessfully for the Arizona State Senate in 1998, 2000, and 2002.

In 2004 he ran for the Arizona House of Representatives, and was elected to represent District 7. When irregularities were discovered in his campaign finances, the Arizona Citizens’ Clean Election Commission recommended that he be removed from office. Smith unsuccessfully fought the removal, and stepped down on January 26, 2006.

In 2010 he again ran for the House, and was re-elected. He served from January 2011 through January 2013, but lost his bid for re-election in 2012 when he was beaten in the Republican primary by 32 votes.
