= Wendy Rogers (politician) =

American politician (born 1954)

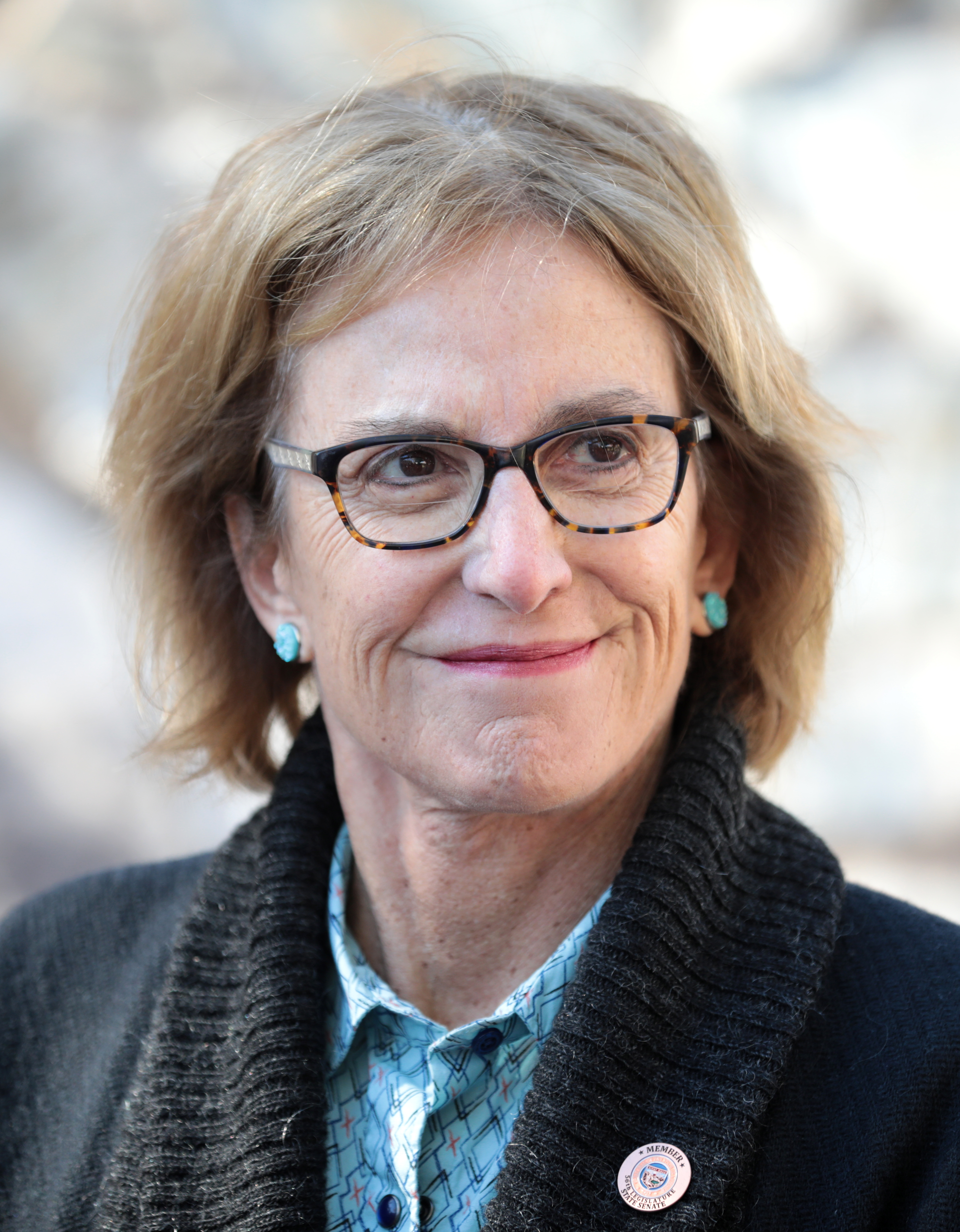
- Rogers in 2023

Member of the Arizona Senate
- Incumbent
- Assumed office January 11, 2021
- Preceded by: Sylvia Allen
- Constituency: 6th district (2021–2023); 7th district (2023–present)

Personal details
- Born: July 24, 1954 (age 72) Fort Knox, Kentucky, U.S.
- Party: Republican
- Spouse: Hal Kunnen (m. 1978)
- Children: 2
- Relatives: Harry Lovejoy Rogers (great-grandfather)
- Education: Michigan State University (BSW); University of Alabama (MSW); California State University, San Bernardino (MS)
- Website: Campaign website

Military service
- Allegiance: United States
- Branch/service: United States Air Force
- Years of service: 1976–1996
- Rank: Lieutenant Colonel

Wendy Rogers (born July 24, 1954) is an American far-right politician who has served in the Arizona Senate since 2021. She currently represents the 7th district as a member of the Republican Party.

Rogers was a U.S. Air Force officer from 1976 to 1996. Before winning election to the state Senate, she unsuccessfully ran for various state and federal offices between 2010 and 2018. In 2020, Rogers mounted a successful primary challenge against incumbent State Senator Sylvia Allen and went on to defeat the Democratic nominee in the general election. Rogers was initially elected to represent the 6th district, but was later re-elected to represent the 7th district due to redistricting.

As a candidate and member of the Arizona Senate, Rogers has courted controversy with inflammatory rhetoric, support for Donald Trump and his attempts to overturn the 2020 election, and her embrace of white nationalism including various antisemitic and racist conspiracy theories. She is a member of the Oath Keepers, an anti-government militia group whose members took part in the January 6 attack on the U.S. Capitol in 2021.

In March 2022, Rogers received a rare censure by the Republican-controlled state senate for her remarks to the white nationalist America First Political Action Conference, and was the subject of an ethics investigation after suggesting that the 2022 Buffalo shooting was a U.S. government false flag operation.

== Early life and education ==
Rogers was born in Fort Knox, Kentucky, on July 24, 1954. She holds a Bachelor of Social Work from Michigan State University, a Master of Social Work from the University of Alabama, and a Master of Science in National Security Studies from California State University, San Bernardino.

== Military career ==
Rogers served in the United States Air Force from 1976 to 1996, retiring with the rank of lieutenant colonel. One of the first 100 female pilots in the Air Force, Rogers earned her flight wings in 1981 and went on to fly the C-141 Starlifter heavy military transport aircraft and C-21 "Learjet" transport. Rogers was later stationed in Europe.

== Political career ==
Beginning in 2010, Rogers ran unsuccessfully for public office five times. In 2010, Rogers ran for the Arizona Senate in the 17th legislative district, losing to Democrat David Schapira in the general election. In 2012, she ran for the U.S. House of Representatives in Arizona's 9th congressional district, losing the Republican primary to Vernon Parker. In 2014, she ran again for the 9th district and won the Republican nomination, but lost to incumbent Democratic congresswoman Kyrsten Sinema. During that campaign, Rogers used footage of the beheading video of American journalist James Foley by ISIL terrorists in a campaign ad seeking to attack Sinema as weak on national security. Democrats condemned the ad as a "reprehensible" smear tactic, while Rogers's campaign defended it.

In 2016, Rogers unsuccessfully sought the Republican nomination for Arizona's 1st congressional district; she was one of a five-person field, along with Pinal County Sheriff Paul Babeu, former state Senator and Arizona Secretary of State Ken Bennett, rancher and businessman Gary Kiehne, and businessman Shawn Redd. During her primary campaign, Rogers was the sole candidate to support Donald Trump's proposal to build a wall on the border with Mexico. She also supported increasing the number of U.S. military personnel deployed to foreign conflicts. Rogers lost, coming in third place behind Babeu, who won the nomination, and Kiehne, the runner-up. In 2018, Rogers ran again and won the Republican nomination for the 1st congressional district, but lost to incumbent Democratic congressman Tom O'Halleran.

=== State Senate election and tenure ===
In 2020, Rogers ran for the Arizona Senate in the 6th legislative district, which encompasses Rim Country and the White Mountains, and extends from Flagstaff to the Arizona–New Mexico border. Rogers unseated longtime Republican incumbent Sylvia Allen in a bitterly contested primary election, and defeated Democratic nominee Felicia French in the general election. During the campaign, Rogers made few public appearances, did not participate in debates, and avoided taking positions on local political issues, such as forest management, education funding, or Arizona's response to the COVID-19 pandemic. Dark money organizations on both sides spent large sums to support and oppose the two candidates. Rogers raised $1 million in campaign contributions, a record for the district. As a candidate and official, she has espoused far-right views and cultivated ties to far-right political causes.

Rogers took office in January 2021. Now serving her second term, she currently serves as Chair of the Arizona Senate Elections Committee, Vice Chair of the Government Committee, and member of the Military Affairs, Public Safety & Border Security Committee and Judiciary Committee, and as a member of the joint legislature's Blockchain and Cryptocurrency Study Committee.

==== Legislation ====
In March 2021, during the COVID-19 pandemic in Arizona, Rogers sponsored legislation to declare gun shops "essential businesses" permitted to remain open during emergencies; the bill passed the Senate on a 16–14 party-line vote. In February 2021, Rogers sponsored legislation seeking to rename a portion of Arizona State Route 260 as the "Donald J. Trump Highway"; State Senator Martín Quezada, a Democrat from Phoenix, described Roger's proposal as "a desperate attempt" to pander to Trump supporters. In 2021, Rogers introduced a bill to ban abortions on the grounds of disability and make performing abortions for this reason a felony.

In January 2021, Rogers introduced legislation to create a special license plate and charitable fund for veterans of overseas conflicts, which passed after being signed into law by the governor.

In January 2022, Rogers proposed a bill that, if accepted, would make Arizona the first state to accept Bitcoin as legal tender, though doubts were raised about its compliance with the Contract Clause of the United States Constitution. Rogers subsequently introduced legislation to allow state agencies to accept cryptocurrencies in the payment of debts, and to exclude cryptocurrencies from Arizona taxes.

In 2024, Rogers sponsored several bills focusing on property rights, child safety, and mental health services. HB2408 amends the Arizona Revised Statutes to assist property owners who experience destruction of their property after the county assessor has closed the property tax rolls. It allows the county assessor to adjust the property's value and maintain the property's classification for up to five years, depending on usage.

Rogers also sponsored HB2473, a bill that limits the maximum licensing fees for mental health professionals and provides fee waivers for individuals transitioning between associate-level and independent-level licensure.

HB2479 requires the Department of Child Safety to notify law enforcement when a child in its care goes missing, is abducted, or runs away. The bill imposes new training and reporting requirements on the department to improve the response to these situations. Rogers also sponsored SB1280, a bill that seeks to prevent individuals who are registered sex offenders from serving on school district governing boards. The bill increases transparency by requiring county school superintendents to publish candidate statements and photographs for school board elections.

On December 16, 2024, Wendy Rogers made a second attempt to designate SR 260 as Donald J. Trump Highway with Arizona Senate Concurrent Memorial 1001. Results for this effort are pending.

==== 2022 re-election campaign; death threat ====
Rogers was reelected to the Arizona Senate in the 7th legislative district in 2022. During the preceding redistricting cycle, Rogers's district went from leaning Republican to heavily Republican. She benefited from a "last-minute change" by the Arizona Independent Redistricting Commission, which altered 7th district boundaries to shift more Democratic-leaning voters to a neighboring district. Rogers was drawn into the same legislative district as fellow incumbent Republican senator Kelly Townsend from Apache Junction. Former president Donald Trump endorsed Rogers, and by January 2022, Rogers had raised a record $2.5 million for her reelection campaign.

On July 4, 2022, Donald Glenn Brown, a former Tucson middle school music teacher, sent a death threat to a store in Show Low where Rogers was attending the city's Independence Day parade. Brown's email, sent from a fake account, threatened to fatally shoot Rogers and others at the store. Brown was charged with attempting to make a terroristic threat, a Class 4 felony. He pled guilty in April 2023 and was sentenced on June 6, 2023, to two and a half years in prison by Navajo County Superior Court Judge Joseph Clark. Reacting to the sentence, Rogers praised the ruling for protecting the interests of her constituents.

Rogers defeated Townsend in the Republican primary on August 22, 2022, having received 59.7% percent of the vote (24,023 votes) to Townsend's 40.3% (16,185). Rogers went on to defeat Democrat Kyle Nitschke in the general election, where she received 63.6% of the vote (63,019 votes) to Nitschke's 36.4% (36,030 votes).

==== 2024 re-election campaign ====
In 2023, Republican state representative David Cook, widely considered to be more moderate than Rogers, announced that he would challenge Rogers in the 2024 Republican primary election. Cook, term-limited from seeking re-election to the Arizona House, claimed that he decided to enter the race after Rogers retweeted a video containing sexually-explicit content from Hunter Biden's laptop. Rogers unsuccessfully sued in an attempt to block Cook from the primary ballot. In the primary election, Rogers defeated Cook with 55 percent of the vote.

During the general election, Rogers faced Democrat Haley Creighton, a former student activist and self-described "queer...nerd" who previously managed the campaign of Rogers's 2022 opponent Kyle Nitschke. In the general election, Rogers easily won re-election to a third term, earning 65% of the vote to Creighton's 35%.

=== Controversies ===
==== Defamation lawsuit ====
While running for Congress in 2018, Rogers ran ads referring to her Republican primary opponent Steve Smith as a "slimy character" and linking his employer, a modeling agency, to "websites linked to sex trafficking". The modeling agency and its owner sued Rogers for defamation. In a 4–3 decision issued in February 2022, the Arizona Supreme Court ruled that Rogers's ad was protected by the First Amendment, and that allowing the case to proceed would "inevitably and intolerably chill political speech." The three dissenting justices criticized the decision as "unnecessary for protecting political speech," claiming that the decision would enable the weaponization of the First Amendment "against innocent bystanders".

==== Ethics investigations ====
In January 2021 a former legislative aide to Rogers filed a complaint with the Senate Ethics Committee accusing Rogers of workplace abuse, claiming that Rogers subjected him to verbal abuse, removed and damaged his belongings, demanded that he perform campaign work on government time, and demanded that he work while on sick leave for COVID-19. An investigation by a Senate attorney found "little evidence" to corroborate the claims, and the complaint was dismissed in March 2021 after the Republican-led Ethics Committee found no clear and convincing evidence of an ethics violation. Both Democrats on the Committee disagreed with the decision.

In June 2022, QAnon conspiracy theorist Ron Watkins filed an ethics complaint against Rogers with the Arizona Senate. In support of his complaint, Watkins cited Rogers's request on the instant messaging service Telegram for the Groypers to "hit" Watkins after he alleged that Rogers had cut a "backroom deal" to prevent election equipment from being examined.

Following the May 2022 mass shooting in Buffalo, New York, Rogers suggested on a social media site that the shooting was a false flag operation perpetrated by U.S. federal government agents. The Republican-controlled Arizona Senate decided two days later, by a 24–3 vote, to open an ethics investigation of Rogers over the comment. Rogers was one of the three Republicans who voted against the investigation. In June 2022, the Senate Ethics Committee counsel issued its report, which made no determination as to whether Rogers violated Senate rules, and concluded that the full Senate was responsible for deciding whether to take any further action with respect to Senator Rogers's remarks.

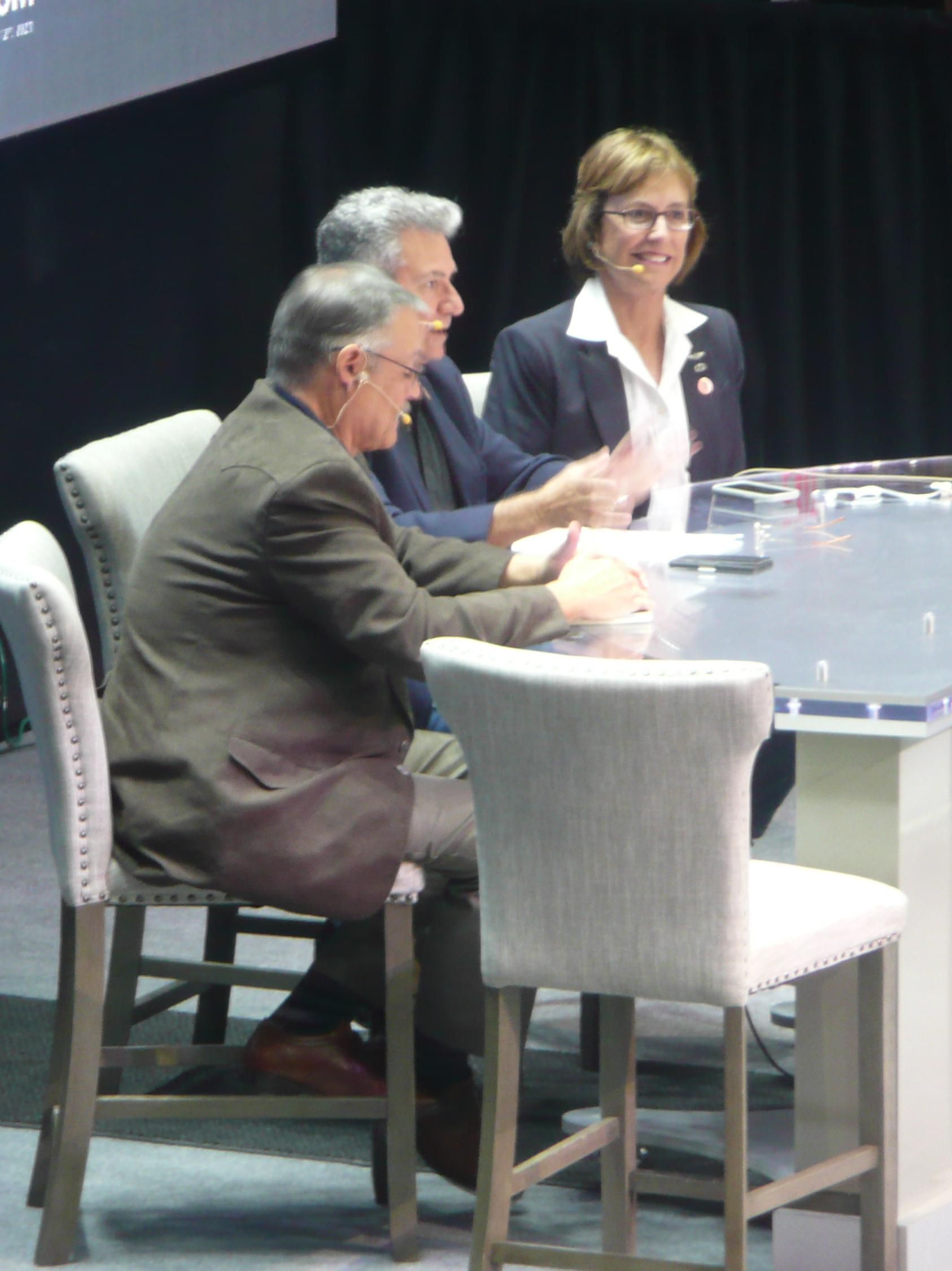
Wendy Rogers, along with Mark Finchem and Sonny Borrelli explaining the Maricopa County Audit at Mike Lindell's Cyber Symposium in Sioux Falls on August 12, 2021

==== Support for overturning the 2020 presidential election ====
Following the 2020 United States presidential election, Rogers promoted the false claim that Donald Trump had won the election. As Arizona's slate of electors met in Phoenix to formally cast the state's electoral votes for Biden, Rogers tweeted "Buy more ammo," drawing condemnation. Later, Rogers falsely claimed that the January 6 U.S. Capitol Attack, in which a mob of Trump supporters attempted to halt the electoral vote count, had been conducted by Antifa groups.

Rogers was a strong supporter of Arizona Senate Republicans' 2021 Maricopa County presidential ballot audit and similar efforts in other states to decertify the election results, gaining significant attention on social media. Following criticism of the audit by the Maricopa County Board of Supervisors, Rogers called for their imprisonment along with that of unnamed electronic voting machine company executives. The audit ultimately found that Biden's margin of victory was larger than originally tabulated.

==== Embrace of far-right extremism; AFPAC speech and censure ====
In 2018, Rogers claimed to be a "charter member" of the Oath Keepers, a militia group known for its promotion of conspiracy theories and violent, extremist, and separatist rhetoric. During her 2020 campaign for the Arizona Senate, she again promoted her membership in the group. After more than two dozen members of the organization were criminally indicted for their role in the January 6 U.S. Capitol attack, Rogers praised the group's "dedication to our Constitution and to our country," including a photo of her speaking to the Cottonwood chapter of the organization.

In December 2020, as a state senator-elect, Rogers praised Confederate general Robert E. Lee as a "great patriot and a great leader".

In June 2021, Rogers appeared on the streaming channel TruNews on a show hosted by Christian nationalist commentator Lauren Witzke. TruNews, along with its founder Rick Wiles, is known for its promotion of antisemitic conspiracy theories, including a claim Trump's impeachment was orchestrated by "seditious Jews" and that Americans are "oppressed by Jewish tyrants". Rogers appeared on TruNews a second time the next month; during this appearance, Witzke called Rogers her "favorite state legislator" and said that the TruNews crew were "really big fans" of hers.

In a Twitter post in July 2021, Rogers claimed that "Americans who love this country" are "being replaced and invaded," echoing the racist and populist Great Replacement conspiracy theory popular among Republicans. Rogers later doubled down, claiming that "communists" were using "mass immigration, education, big tech, big corporations & other strategies" to carry out the replacement. Rogers has embraced white nationalism and promoted various antisemitic conspiracy theories about Ukrainian president Volodymyr Zelenskyy, George Soros, and the Rothschild family. In February 2022, she gave a pre-recorded speech to the America First Political Action Conference in which she referred to the event's white nationalist organizer Nick Fuentes as the "most persecuted man in America" and called for the public hanging of unspecified "traitors". Following the conference, Rogers praised white nationalist Vincent James Foxx, suggesting he run for office.

On March 1, 2022, In response to her speech, Republican Arizona Senate Majority Leader Rick Gray moved to censure Rogers for "conduct unbecoming of a senator, including...encouraging violence." On the Senate floor, Rogers refused to apologize and accused Senate Republican leadership of "colluding with the Democrats". The final censure resolution (which passed 24–3) criticized Rogers for "encouraging violence" and threatening the "political destruction of those who disagree with her views". Rogers was the first Arizona senator to be censured in at least four decades.

In September 2024, in celebration of far right German party AfD's victory in the 2024 Thuringian state election, she tweeted the first stanza of Deutschlandlied, commonly associated with the Nazi Party.

==== Residence ====
Members of the Arizona legislature are required to live in the districts they represent. In filing papers to run for state Senate, Rogers listed her residence as the 708-square-foot mobile home in Flagstaff. However, a trust document signed by Rogers and her husband in January 2023 stated that they were "currently residing" in Tempe. Rogers and her husband, Hal Kunnen, previously owned three residences: a single-family residence in Tempe, a single-family residence in the Stellar Airpark in Chandler, and a mobile home in Flagstaff's Wildwood Hills. As of 2024, Rogers and Kunnen had sold their homes in Tempe and Chandler.

In 2023, while investigating Rogers's residence, Arizona Capitol Times reporter Camryn Sanchez rang a doorbell at the home and asked her questions on the floor of the Arizona Senate. Rogers obtained a restraining order against Sanchez, which the Flagstaff Justice Court granted without notice to the reporter. The order was criticized by the Freedom of the Press Foundation, and the Capitol Times challenged it as a baseless and unconstitutional prior restraint infringement upon the freedom of the press. The order was later dissolved after a different judge ruled that Sanchez was engaged in "legitimate" news-gathering activity, and that the reporter did not engage in activity that would cause a "reasonable person to be seriously alarmed, annoyed or harassed."

== Personal life ==
Rogers married Hal Kunnen in 1978; they have two children and own a home inspection business. Like Rogers, Kunnen is a retired Air Force officer.

== Bibliography ==
- Rogers, Wendy (July 2, 2011). The First 100: The Life and Times of a Woman Air Force Pilot. Amazon. ASIN B0059Y6W1I.
- Rogers, Wendy (April 6, 2012). Earning My Wings. Amazon. ASIN B007JNRNAG.
