= 2020 Arizona House of Representatives election =

- November 3, 2020

All 60 seats in the Arizona House of Representatives 31 seats needed for a majority
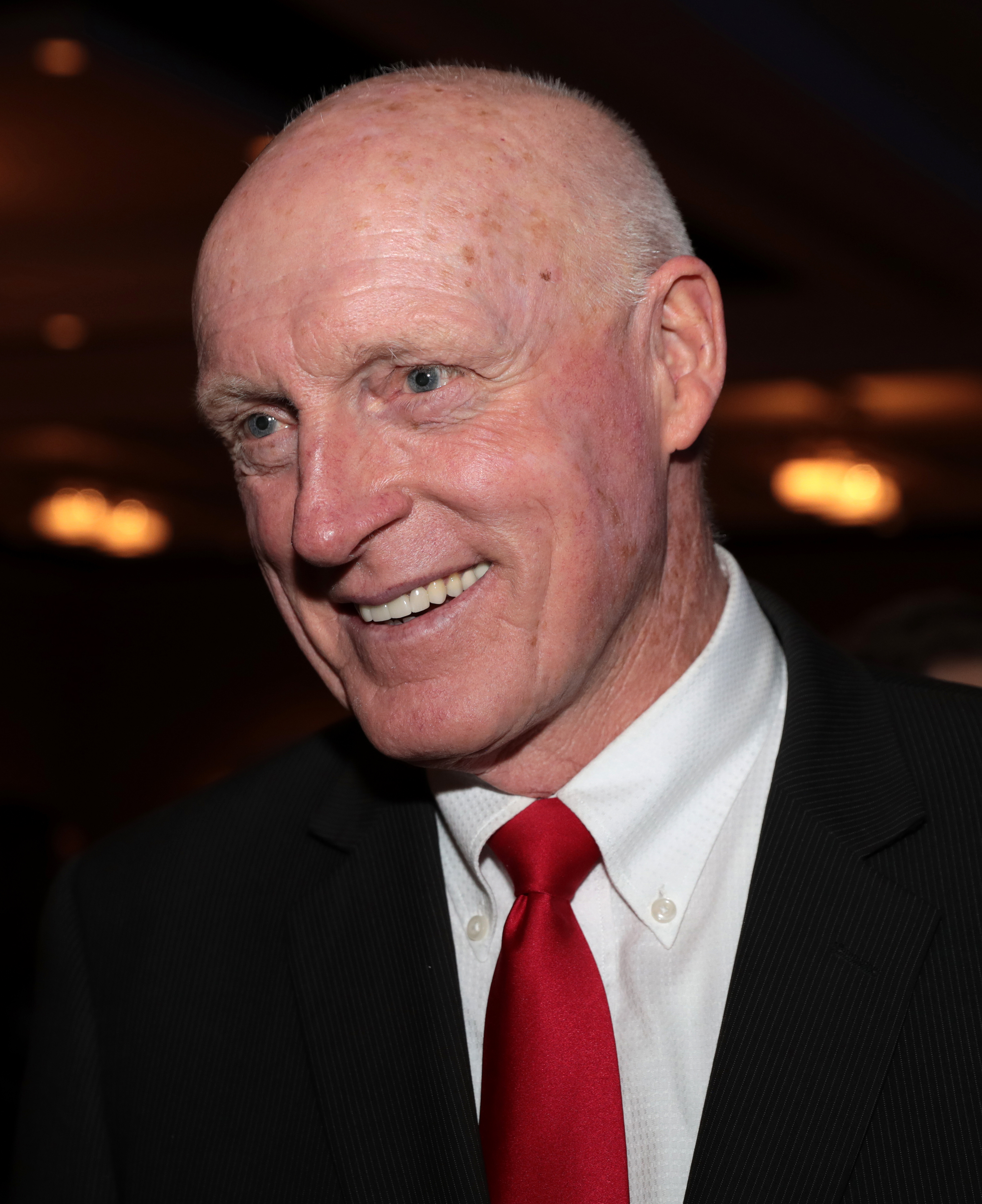

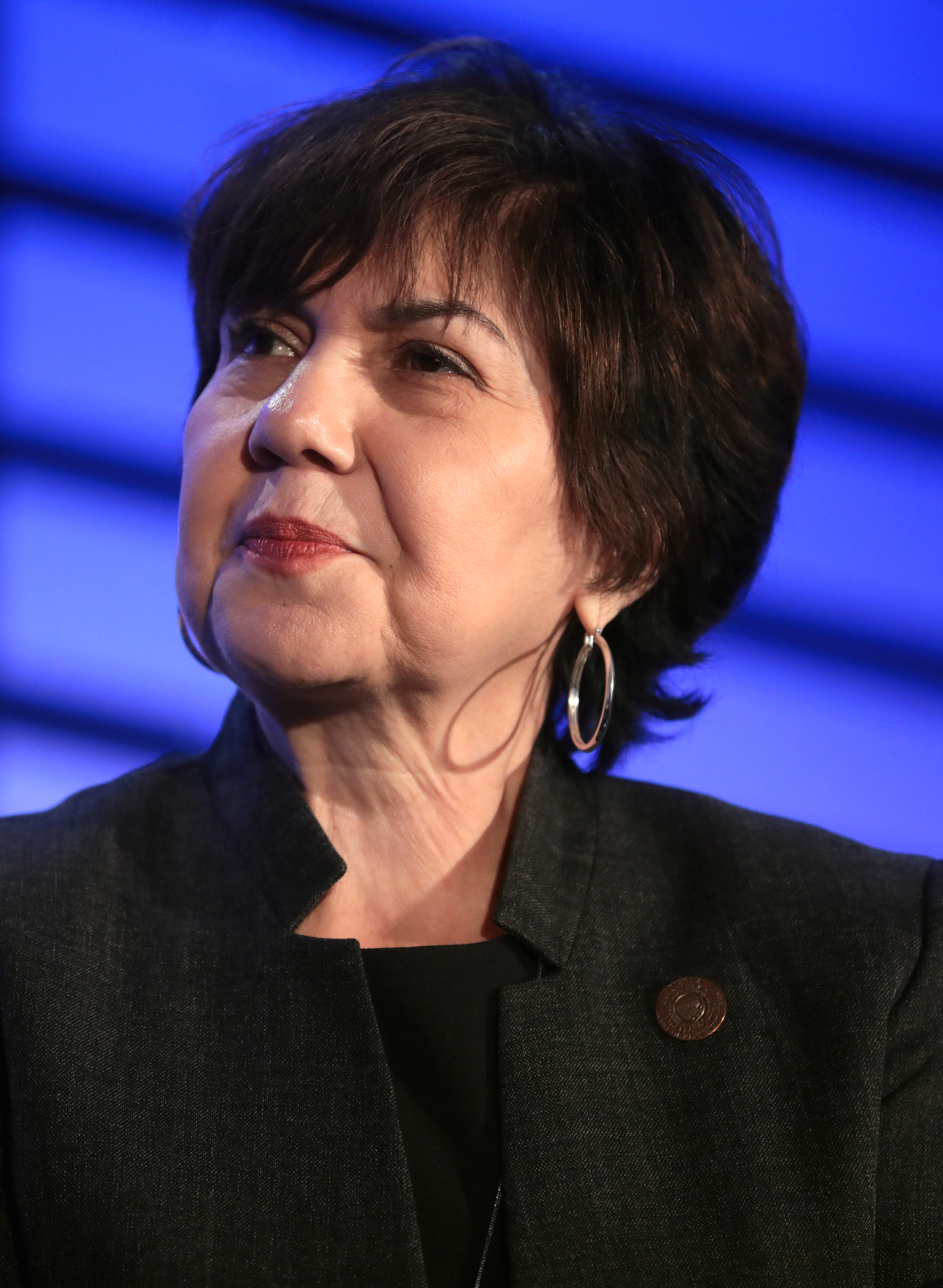
	Majority party	Minority party
Leader	Russell Bowers	Charlene Fernandez
Party	Republican	Democratic
Leader since	January 14, 2019	January 14, 2019
Leader's seat	25th	4th
Seats before	31	29
Seats won	31	29
Seat change	Steady	Steady
Popular vote	2,522,188	2,094,461
Percentage	54.63%	45.37%
- Results: Democratic hold Democratic gain Republican hold Republican gain
Speaker before election
Russell Bowers
Republican
Elected Speaker
Russell Bowers
Republican

The 2020 Arizona House of Representatives election was held on November 3, 2020. Voters in each of Arizona's 30 legislative districts elected two state representatives to the Arizona House of Representatives. The election coincided with the elections for other offices, including the presidency, U.S Senate, U.S. House of Representatives, and state senate. The primary election took place on August 4, 2020.

== Predictions ==
Source	Ranking	As of
The Cook Political Report	Lean D (flip)	October 21, 2020

== Polling ==
Each voter may select up to two candidates in two-member districts such as HD23; the top two vote-getters win the seats. Consequently, poll results have been displayed here as the accumulation of a candidate's first and second preferences and therefore sum to 200% instead of 100%.

House District 23

Poll source	Date(s) administered	Sample size (Note: Key: A – all adults RV – registered voters LV – likely voters V – unclear)	Margin of error	Joseph Chaplik (R)	Eric Kurland (D)	John Kavanagh (R)	Other	Undecided
Public Policy Polling	October 6–7, 2020	500 (V)	± 4.4%	42%	38%	32%	46% (Note: Would not vote for a second candidate with 46%)	22%
Public Policy Polling	September 1–2, 2020	– (V) (Note: Not yet released)	–	43%	39%	37%	–	–

== Results ==
=== District 1 ===
2020 Arizona House of Representatives election, 1st district
Party	Candidate	Votes	%
Republican	Judy Burges	92,058	40.8%
Republican	Quang Nguyen	86,405	38.3%
Democratic	Judy Stahl	47,204	20.9%
Total votes		225,667	100%
Republican hold			
Republican hold			

=== District 2 ===
2020 Arizona House of Representatives election, 2nd district
Party	Candidate	Votes	%
Democratic	Daniel Hernandez Jr. (incumbent)	46,467	37.3%
Democratic	Andrea Dalessandro	44,296	35.5%
Republican	Deborah McEwen	33,956	27.2%
Total votes		124,719	100%

=== District 3 ===
2020 Arizona House of Representatives election, 3rd district
Party	Candidate	Votes	%
Democratic	Alma Hernandez (incumbent)	49,009	50.3%
Democratic	Andrés Cano (incumbent)	48,505	49.7%
Total votes		97,514	100%
Democratic hold			
Democratic hold			

=== District 4 ===
2020 Arizona House of Representatives election, 4th district
Party	Candidate	Votes	%
Democratic	Charlene Fernandez (incumbent)	40,797	39.8%
Republican	Joel John	32,318	31.5%
Democratic	Geraldine "Gerae" Peten (incumbent)	29,342	28.6%
Total votes		102,457	100%
Democratic hold			
Republican gain from Democratic			

=== District 5 ===
2020 Arizona House of Representatives election, 5th district
Party	Candidate	Votes	%
Republican	Regina Cobb (incumbent)	71,279	53.9%
Republican	Leo Biasiucci (incumbent)	60,875	46.1%
Total votes		132,154	100%
Republican hold			
Republican hold			

=== District 6 ===
2020 Arizona House of Representatives election, 6th district
Party	Candidate	Votes	%
Republican	Walter "Walt" Blackman (incumbent)	59,325	28.9%
Republican	Brenda Barton	54,041	26.3%
Democratic	Coral J Evans	51,986	25.3%
Total votes		165,352	100%
Republican hold			
Republican hold			

=== District 7 ===
2020 Arizona House of Representatives election, 7th district
Party	Candidate	Votes	%
Democratic	Myron Tsosie (incumbent)	51,897	35.4%
Democratic	Arlando Teller (incumbent)	42,272	28.9%
Republican	James "Jim" Parks	26,897	18.4%
Total votes		121,066	100%
Democratic hold			
Democratic hold			

=== District 8 ===
2020 Arizona House of Representatives election, 8th district
Party	Candidate	Votes	%
Republican	David Cook (incumbent)	45,117	35.7%
Republican	Frank Pratt	43,799	34.6%
Democratic	Sharon Girard	37,384	29.6%
Total votes		126,300	100%
Republican hold			
Republican hold			

=== District 9 ===
2020 Arizona House of Representatives election, 9th district
Party	Candidate	Votes	%
Democratic	Pamela Hannley Powers (incumbent)	64,781	36.5%
Democratic	Randall "Randy" Friese (incumbent)	64,772	36.5%
Republican	Brendan Lyons	48,026	27.0%
Total votes		177,579	100%
Democratic hold			
Democratic hold			

=== District 10 ===
2020 Arizona House of Representatives election, 10th district
Party	Candidate	Votes	%
Democratic	Domingo DeGrazia (incumbent)	59,725	28.6%
Democratic	Stephanie Stahl Hamilton	59,344	28.4%
Republican	Michael Hicks	46,950	22.5%
Total votes		166,019	100%
Democratic hold			
Democratic hold			

=== District 11 ===
2020 Arizona House of Representatives election, 11th district
Party	Candidate	Votes	%
Republican	Bret Roberts (incumbent)	68,805	34.7%
Republican	Mark Finchem (incumbent)	68,101	34.4%
Democratic	Felipe R Perez	61,245	30.9%
Total votes		198,151	100%
Republican hold			
Republican hold			

=== District 12 ===
2020 Arizona House of Representatives election, 12th district
Party	Candidate	Votes	%
Republican	Travis Grantham (incumbent)	93,972	48.3%
Republican	Jake Hoffman	92,941	47.8%
Total votes		186,913	100%
Republican hold			
Republican hold			

=== District 13 ===
2020 Arizona House of Representatives election, 13th district
Party	Candidate	Votes	%
Republican	Timothy "Tim" Dunn (incumbent)	71,049	37.7%
Republican	Joanne Osborne (incumbent)	69,733	37.0%
Democratic	Mariana Sandoval	47,650	25.3%
Total votes		140,782	100%
Republican hold			
Republican hold			

=== District 14 ===
2020 Arizona House of Representatives election, 14th district
Party	Candidate	Votes	%
Republican	Gail Griffin (incumbent)	63,170	32.7%
Republican	Becky Nutt (incumbent)	62,722	32.5%
Democratic	Kimberly "Kim" Beach - Moschetti	35,289	18.3%
Total votes		161,181	100%
Republican hold			
Republican hold			

=== District 15 ===
2020 Arizona House of Representatives election, 15th district
Party	Candidate	Votes	%
Republican	Steve Kaiser	71,900	37.1%
Republican	Justin Wilmeth	66,482	34.3%
Democratic	Kristin Dybvig-Pawelko	55,259	28.5%
Total votes		193,641	100%
Republican hold			
Republican hold			

=== District 16 ===
2020 Arizona House of Representatives election, 16th district
Party	Candidate	Votes	%
Republican	Jacqueline Parker	74,784	39.2%
Republican	John Fillmore (incumbent)	68,760	36.1%
Democratic	Helen Hunter	47,071	24.7%
Total votes		190,615	100%
Republican hold			
Republican hold			

=== District 17 ===
2020 Arizona House of Representatives election, 17th district
Party	Candidate	Votes	%
Democratic	Jennifer Pawlik (incumbent)	65,172	33.8%
Republican	Jeff Weninger (incumbent)	64,501	33.4%
Republican	Liz Harris	63,409	32.8%
Total votes		193,082	100%
Democratic hold			
Republican hold			

=== District 18 ===
2020 Arizona House of Representatives election, 18th district
Party	Candidate	Votes	%
Democratic	Jennifer Jermaine (incumbent)	70,049	28.9%
Democratic	Denise "Mitzi" Epstein (incumbent)	67,649	27.9%
Republican	Bob Robson	55,140	22.8%
Total votes		192,838	79.6%
Democratic hold			
Democratic hold			

=== District 19 ===
2020 Arizona House of Representatives election, 19th district
Party	Candidate	Votes	%
Democratic	Diego Espinoza (incumbent)	43,372	52.9%
Democratic	Lorenzo Sierra (incumbent)	38,617	47.1%
Total votes		81,989	100.0%
Democratic hold			
Democratic hold			

=== District 20 ===
2020 Arizona House of Representatives election, 20th district
Party	Candidate	Votes	%
Democratic	Judy Schwiebert	50,633	34.5%
Republican	Shawnna Bolick (incumbent)	49,268	33.5%
Republican	Anthony Kern (incumbent)	47,094	32.0%
Total votes		146,995	100.0%
Democratic gain from Republican			
Republican hold			

=== District 21 ===
2020 Arizona House of Representatives election, 21st district
Party	Candidate	Votes	%
Republican	Beverly Pingerelli	57,803	35.6%
Republican	Kevin Payne (incumbent)	53,441	32.9%
Democratic	Kathy Knecht	51,047	31.5%
Total votes		162,291	100%
Republican hold			
Republican hold			

=== District 22 ===
2020 Arizona House of Representatives election, 22nd district
Party	Candidate	Votes	%
Republican	Ben Toma (incumbent)	92,912	32.3%
Republican	Frank Carroll (incumbent)	92,231	32.1%
Democratic	Wendy Garcia	53,522	18.6%
Total votes		238,655	
Republican hold			
Republican hold			

=== District 23 ===
2020 Arizona House of Representatives election, 23rd district
Party	Candidate	Votes	%
Republican	John Kavanagh (incumbent)	86,307	37.2%
Republican	Joseph Chaplik	80,264	34.6%
Democratic	Eric Kurland	65,257	28.1%
Total votes		231,828	100.0%
Republican hold			
Republican hold			

=== District 24 ===
2020 Arizona House of Representatives election, 24th district
Party	Candidate	Votes	%
Democratic	Amish Shah (incumbent)	61,639	35.9%
Democratic	Jennifer Longdon (incumbent)	60,233	35.1%
Republican	Robyn Cushman	26,099	15.2%
Total votes		147,971	
Democratic hold			
Democratic hold			

=== District 25 ===
2020 Arizona House of Representatives election, 25th district
Party	Candidate	Votes	%
Republican	Michelle Udall (incumbent)	69,049	38.7%
Republican	Russell W. "Rusty" Bowers (incumbent)	63,412	35.5%
Democratic	Suzanne Hug	46,180	25.9%
Total votes		178,641	100%
Republican hold			
Republican hold			

=== District 26 ===
2020 Arizona House of Representatives election, 26th district
Party	Candidate	Votes	%
Democratic	Melody Hernandez	46,266	34.2%
Democratic	Athena Salman (incumbent)	44,981	33.2%
Republican	Seth "Marcus" Sifuentes	22,316	16.5%
Total votes		113,563	
Democratic hold			
Democratic hold			

=== District 27 ===
2020 Arizona House of Representatives election, 27th district
Party	Candidate	Votes	%
Democratic	Diego Rodriguez (incumbent)	48,039	43.0%
Democratic	Reginald Bolding (incumbent)	43,334	38.8%
Republican	Tatiana M. Peña	20,236	18.1%
Total votes		111,609	100%
Democratic hold			
Democratic hold			

=== District 28 ===
2020 Arizona House of Representatives election, 28th district
Party	Candidate	Votes	%
Democratic	Kelli Butler (incumbent)	60,871	27.6%
Democratic	Aaron Lieberman (incumbent)	57,760	26.2%
Republican	Jana Jackson	52,839	23.9%
Total votes		171,470	
Democratic hold			
Democratic hold			

=== District 29 ===
2020 Arizona House of Representatives election, 29th district
Party	Candidate	Votes	%
Democratic	Cesar Chavez (incumbent)	38,818	38.0%
Democratic	Richard Andrade (incumbent)	32,075	31.4%
Republican	Billy Bragg	15,811	15.5%
Total votes		86,704	
Democratic hold			
Democratic hold			

=== District 30 ===
2020 Arizona House of Representatives election, 30th district
Party	Candidate	Votes	%
Democratic	Raquel Terán (incumbent)	34,106	52.8%
Democratic	Robert Meza (incumbent)	30,546	47.3%
Total votes		64,652	100%
Democratic hold			
Democratic hold			

== Notes ==
- Percentages may not total 100% because of rounding.

== See also ==
- 2020 Arizona elections
  - 2020 Arizona Senate election
