= David Marshall (Arizona politician) =

American politician

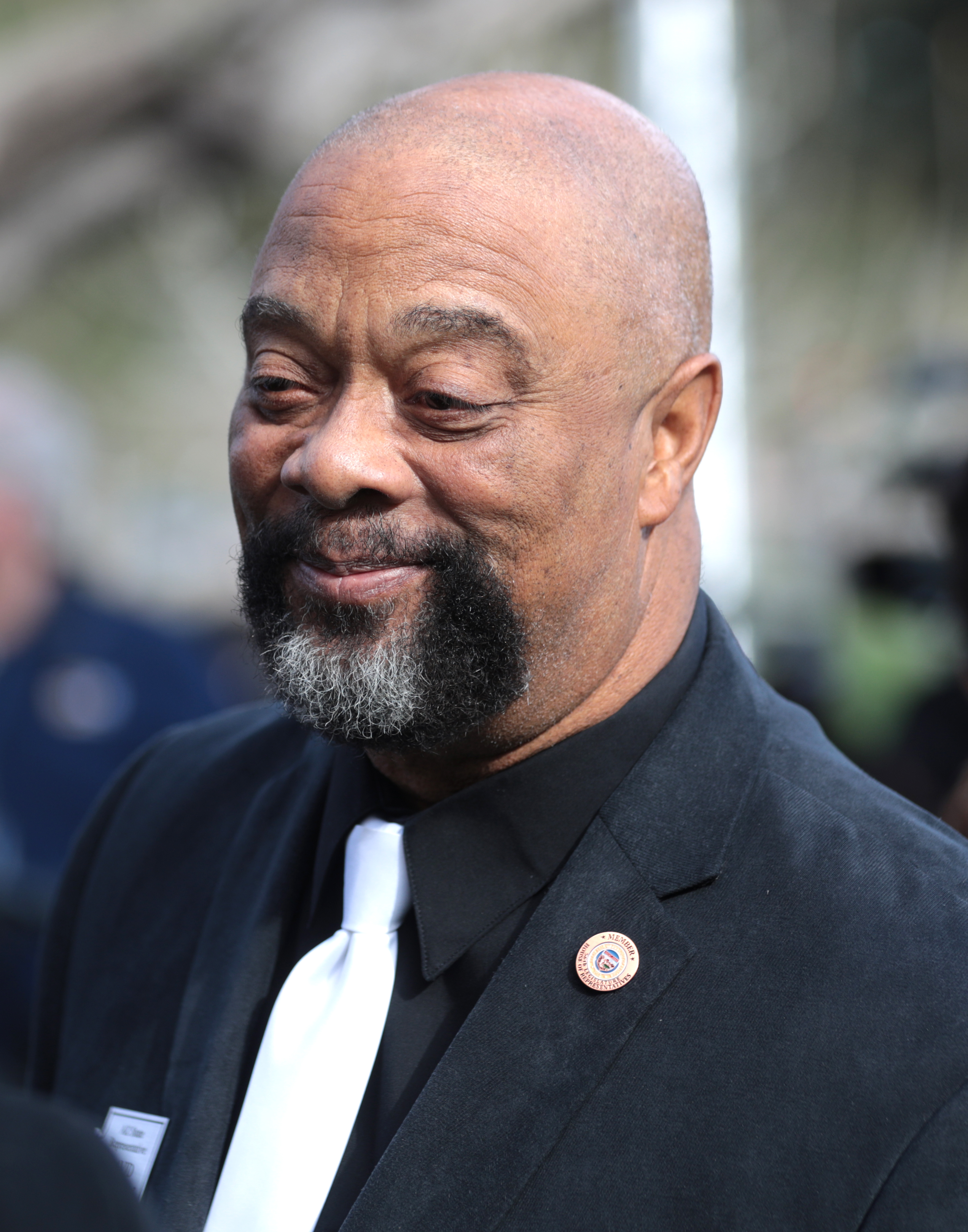
- Marshall in 2023

Recorder of Navajo County, Arizona
- Disputed (Note: It is disputed whether Marshall can hold another state or country office “during the term for which he shall have been elected," under the Arizona Constitution.)
- Assumed office April 21, 2026
- Appointed by: Navajo County Board of Supervisors
- Preceded by: Timothy Jordan

Member of the Arizona House of Representatives from the 7th district
- In office January 9, 2023 – April 20, 2026 Serving with Walter Blackman
- Preceded by: Jasmine Blackwater-Nygren
- Succeeded by: Sylvia Allen

Personal details
- Born: Arlington, Virginia, U.S.
- Party: Republican
- Website: Campaign website

Military service
- Branch/service: United States Air Force

David Marshall is an American politician, Navajo County, Arizona Recorder, former police officer, pastor and former Republican member of the Arizona House of Representatives elected to represent District 7 in 2022.

== Early life and career ==
Marshall was raised in California, graduating from high school in Santa Ana, California. He then joined the United States Air Force, and after being honorably discharged joined the Santa Ana Police Department. Marshall moved with his family to Snowflake, Arizona, in 1999, where he ran a safehouse for battered women, and also became ordained as a pastor.

== Elections ==
- 2022 Marshall and David Cook won a three-way contest in the Republican Primary, defeating incumbent State Representative John Fillmore. They went on to defeat Independent write-in candidate Chris Verrill, as there were no Democratic nominees for the position.
