= Bob Thorpe (politician) =

American politician

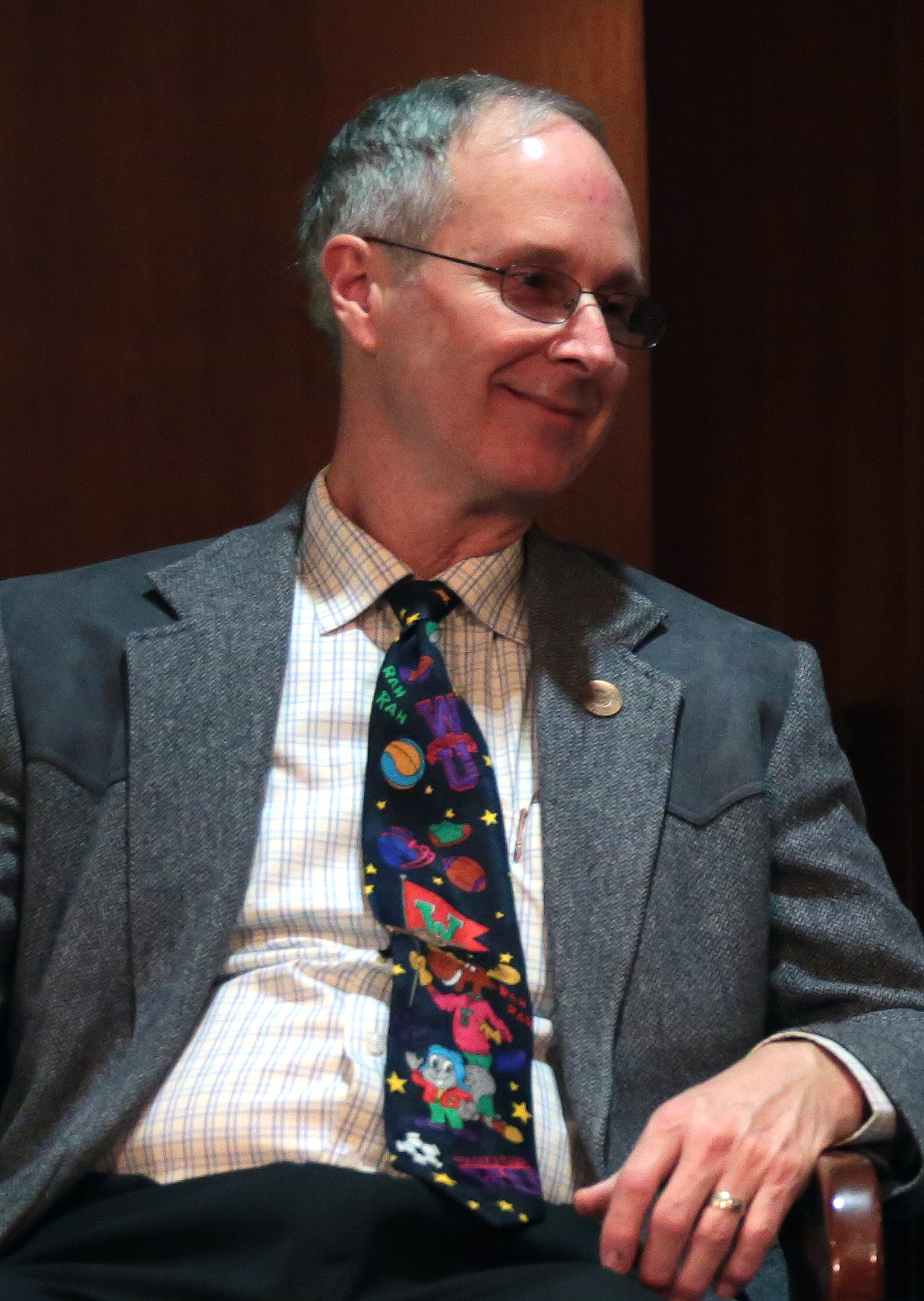

Member of the Arizona House of Representatives from the 6th district
- In office January 14, 2013 – January 11, 2021
- Preceded by: Carl Seel
- Succeeded by: Brenda Barton

Personal details
- Party: Republican
- Website: thorpe4az.com

Bob Thorpe is an American politician and a Republican member of the Arizona House of Representatives representing District 6 since January 14, 2013. He is also a part of the Tea Party Movement.

== Early life and career ==
Bob Thorpe was born and raised in Burbank, California. Before serving in the Arizona legislature, he had a varied career in residential construction, website design, as a small business owner of a software company, and worked for Price Waterhouse among many other endeavors.

He received his Bachelor of Arts degree in Liberal Arts from California State University, Northridge in 1981. He went on to complete graduate coursework in several different disciplines at CSU Northridge and Los Angeles Pierce College among other colleges. He moved to Arizona in 2003, where he was a volunteer firefighter.

== Elections ==
- 2018 Republican Walt Blackman and Thorpe won the two district seats in the general election, with 45,210 votes and 44,314 votes, respectively.
- 2016 Thorpe and Republican Brenda Barton defeated Democrat Alex Martinez in the general election.
- 2014 Thorpe won reelection by a 16 percent margin.
- 2012 Thorpe was one of two candidates winning the August 28, 2012 Republican Primary, with 14,280 votes, and won the first seat in the four-way November 6, 2012 general election with 42,675 votes.

== Introduced legislation ==
Thorpe has introduced legislation that challenges federal authority in environmental matters. In 2014, Thorpe introduced and later amended a bill that aimed to end the Endangered Species Act in Arizona and deport certain endangered animals. He also introduced legislation asserting Arizona's right to decline to cooperate with the EPA on air quality standards.

In 2014, Thorpe sponsored SB1093, which would have required federal law enforcement and other agencies doing business in an Arizona county to register with and present a warrant to the county sheriff. The proposed bill also stipulated that half of all fines imposed by the federal government must be turned over to Arizona's general fund. The bill was rejected by the Senate Rules Committee, which voted 4–2 against it after its attorney said that it would likely violate the Constitution.

Thorpe has campaigned on the issues that "assert the primacy of county sheriffs in enforcing the law in their counties". AZcentral described this as "a central tenet of the sovereignty movement".

Thorpe's web page says that "Arizona sheriffs need to arrest federal agents whenever they harm the sovereign rights of our citizen's [sic], especially concerning land, water and the right to earn a living."

In 2017 Thorpe introduced HB2120 which would ban all activities from college campuses in the state which "are designed primarily for a particular ethnic group" and "promote social justice toward a race." In 2017, the American Conservative Union gave him a lifetime evaluation of 89%.

== Statements about Cliven Bundy ==
In April 2014, Thorpe travelled at his own expense to meet with people gathered at Cliven Bundy's ranch in Nevada. During the weekend of his visit, Bundy supporters engaged in an armed standoff with law enforcement officers. Upon returning to Arizona, Thorpe reportedly urged Arizona state legislators to support Cliven Bundy.

After Thorpe's visit, Bundy was recorded saying that "the Negro" was better off in slavery. Thorpe wrote that he disagreed with Bundy's "racially insensitive statements", and he also wrote disapprovingly of the cattle round-up that prompted the standoff. AZcentral criticized the mild language that Thorpe used to describe Bundy's statement, noting that Thorpe had also used the phrase "racially insensitive" to describe posts that he had deleted from his own Twitter account. The Center for Biological Diversity alleged that Thorpe's statement "repeats the core beliefs of the posse comitatus movement."

Steve Hansen, a Democratic Arizona House candidate in a different district, criticized Thorpe's understanding of the Bundy conflict. Citing Thorpe's own admission that he is “unfamiliar with the (Bundy) legal case,” Hansen wrote, "One would think that an Arizona lawmaker that is interested enough to travel to Nevada and meet with the people assembled at the Bundy 'event' would be intellectually curious enough to look into the legality of actions on both sides of the dispute."

== Controversies ==
In April 2013, Thorpe invited other legislators to a demonstration from a bulletproof vest retailer. The demonstration was to be held at the state Capitol. Thorpe cancelled the event after he received advice from a legislative lawyer about the impropriety of such a demonstration. He called the plan a "rookie mistake", and described his belief that mental health issues are responsible for most violent events. "I support people owning guns and doing that lawfully," Thorpe said, "but we’ve got some wackos out there."

Later that year, Thorpe tweeted a series of race-related messages that were criticized by Democrats, civil rights activists, and the Republican House Speaker. One of the messages Thorpe posted suggested that Eric Holder, the first black attorney general, was "soft on crime" for race-related reasons. Democratic legislator Martin Quezada described the tweets as "race-baiting", and Republican House Speaker Andy Tobin said that he was "dismayed and disappointed". Thorpe apologized, deleted the offending tweets, locked down his Twitter account, and prevented reporters from following it.
