= Brenda Barton =

American politician

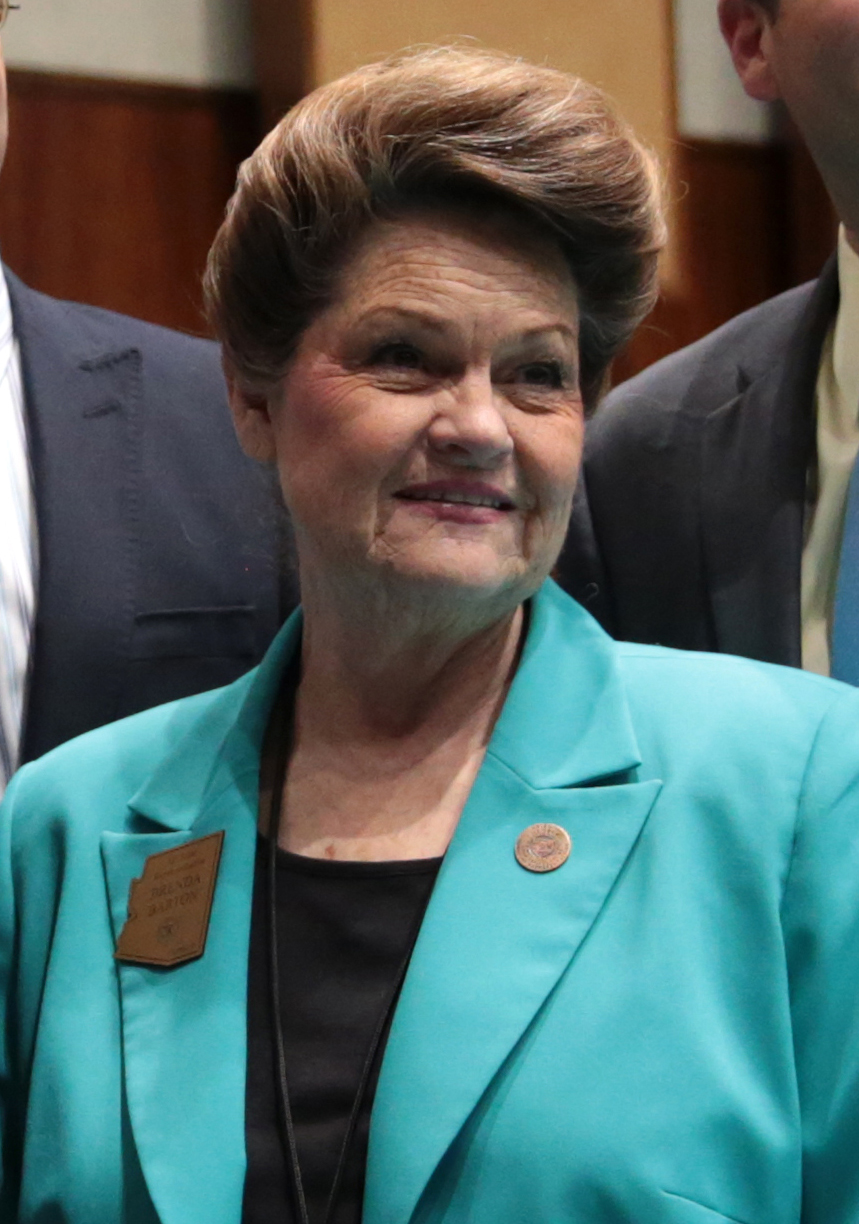

Member of the Arizona House of Representatives from the 6th district
- In office January 11, 2021 – January 9, 2023 Serving with Walter Blackman
- Preceded by: Bob Thorpe
- Succeeded by: Mae Peshlakai
- In office January 14, 2013 – January 7, 2019
- Succeeded by: Walter Blackman

Member of the Arizona House of Representatives from the 5th district
- In office January 10, 2011 – January 14, 2013 Serving with Chester Crandell

Personal details
- Born: Artesia, Arizona
- Party: Republican

Brenda Barton is an American politician and former member of the Arizona House of Representatives representing Arizona's 6th Legislative District. She served as the Chairman of the House Agriculture, Water and Lands Committee from 2012 until giving up her position due to term limits in 2018.

== Early life and career ==
A Pioneer Arizonan, her family first settled in the Territory in 1870. Barton was born near the historic family homestead in Artesia, Arizona. After over 20 years in accounting and materials management with the City of Safford, she retired in 2009. She participated in the Sagebrush rebellion, and Barton is a former county officer with People for the West, an advocacy group promoting private property rights and opposing federal intervention in western lands. She graduated from The Leadership Institute as well as the Western Legislative Academy in Colorado. Barton is also a graduate of the Dodie Londen Excellence in Public Service Series and a former state officer with the Arizona Federation of Republican Women.

== Elections ==
- 2014 Barton and Bob Thorpe were unopposed in the Republican primary. Thorpe and Barton defeated Morrison in the general election.
- 2012 Barton and Thorpe ran unopposed in the Republican primary on August 28, 2012. She won the general election on November 6, 2012, with 41,122 votes.
- 2010 With House District 5 incumbent Democratic Representative retiring and Republican Representative Bill Konopnicki running for Arizona Senate and leaving both seats open, Barton ran in the three-way August 24, 2010, Republican Primary and placed first; in the four-way November 2, 2010, general election Barton took the first seat and fellow Republican nominee Chester Crandell took the second seat ahead of Democratic nominees Bill Shumway and Prescott Winslow.

Barton's district reached from the Grand Canyon, through Flagstaff and Sedona and east through Payson to the White Mountains. The population of her Legislative District was over 216,000, and Flagstaff is the largest metropolitan area within her former District.

Frustrated by the economic impact to her rural district caused by the United States federal government shutdown in 2013, as well as the administration's initial refusal to allow Arizona to keep the park open, Barton took to Facebook to express her anger over the losses of over $1.6 million per day being suffered by her rural communities and compared President Barack Obama to Adolf Hitler.

== Sponsored legislation ==
In 2014, Barton authored two pieces of legislation that were signed into law: HB2523, Authorization of Water Supply Development, and HB2343, which created a funding mechanism to clear the fuel load on Arizona State Lands.

Barton attempted to increase supplemental funding levels for Arizona community colleges in 2014. The budget appropriation for $25 million was successfully opposed by budget hawks in the Conservative Caucus.

Barton also co-sponsored Senator Crandell's SB1093. A minor bill, the proposed legislation would have required federal law enforcement and other agencies conducting enforcement activities (such as the EPA or BLM) in an Arizona county to cooperate with and provide the county sheriff documentation of their legal authority to conduct an enforcement activity within their county. The proposed bill also stipulated that half of all fines imposed by the federal government must be turned over to Arizona's general fund. The bill was voted down in the Senate Rules Committee, and was never brought to a floor vote.
