= Wenona Benally =

American politician

Wenona Benally Baldenegro
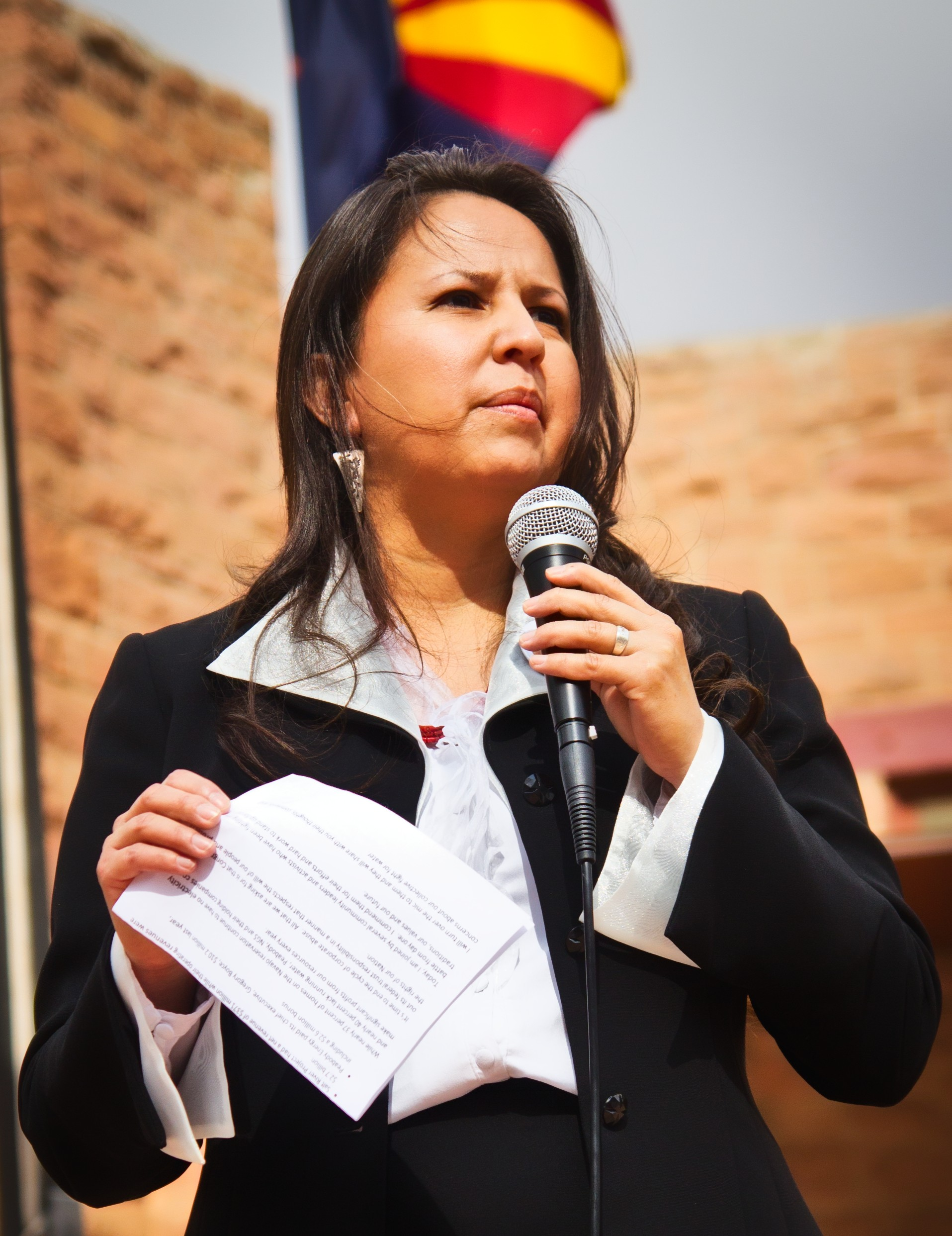

Member of the Arizona House of Representatives from the 7th district
- In office January 9, 2017 – January 9, 2019 Serving with Eric Descheenie
- Preceded by: Jennifer D. Benally
- Succeeded by: Arlando Teller

Personal details
- Party: Democratic
- Education: Harvard Law School John F. Kennedy School of Government University of Arizona Arizona State University
- Profession: Attorney

Wenona Benally is an American politician and a Democratic member of the Arizona House of Representatives elected to represent District 7 from 2017 to 2019. She previously ran for the U.S. House to represent Arizona's 1st congressional district. Benally is a member of the Navajo Nation.

== Elections ==
- 2016 Benally and Eric Descheenie were unopposed in the Democratic primary and the general election.
- 2012 Benally ran in the 2012 election for the U.S. House to represent Arizona's 1st District. She was defeated by former congresswoman Ann Kirkpatrick who went on to win the general election.

== See also ==
- List of Native American politicians
- Native American women in politics
