= Eric Descheenie =

American politician

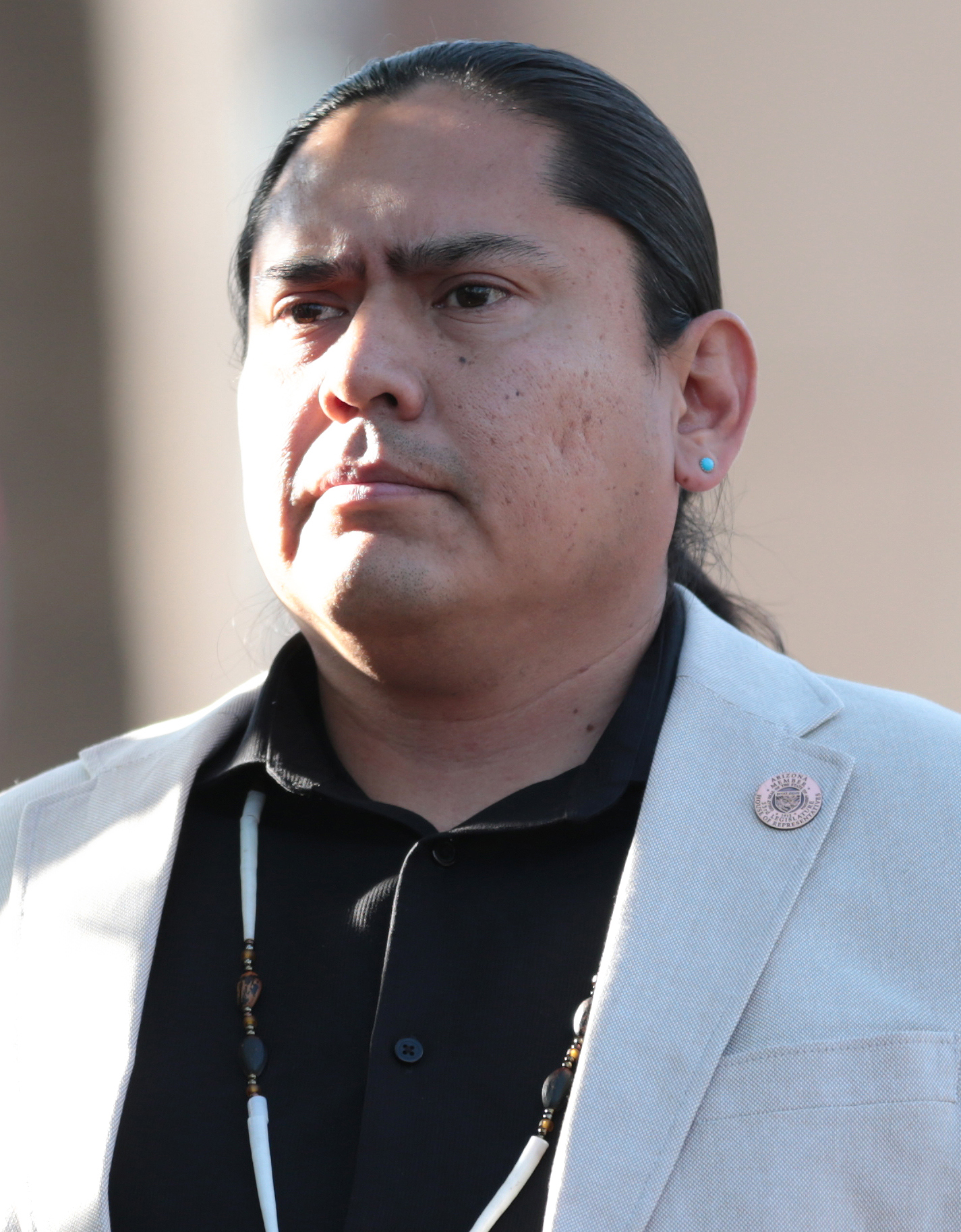
- Descheenie in 2017

Member of the Arizona House of Representatives from the 7th district
- In office January 9, 2017 – January 14, 2019
- Preceded by: Albert Hale
- Succeeded by: Myron Tsosie

Personal details
- Born: Tuba City, Arizona, U.S.
- Party: Democratic
- Education: Arizona State University, Tempe (BA)

Eric Descheenie is an American politician who is a former member of the Arizona House of Representatives and a candidate for the 2026 United States House of Representatives election in Arizona's 2nd congressional district. He is a member of the Democratic Party.

== Early life, education, and career ==
Descheenie was born in Tuba City, Arizona, on the Navajo Nation in 1978. His family is originally from Chinle, Arizona. Descheenie attended Arizona State University (ASU) and earned his bachelor's degree in sociology. In 2004, he began working at the Arizona Governor's Office of Equal Opportunity under Governor Janet Napolitano. Following this, he became Tribal Liaison for the Arizona Department of Housing, managing the Governor's Tribal Housing Initiative.

== Political career ==
In 2016, Descheenie was elected to the Arizona House of Representatives, serving from 2017 to 2018.

In 2018, Descheenie served as a delegate to the United Nations Expert Mechanism on the Rights of Indigenous Peoples in Geneva, Switzerland.

In August 2025, Descheenie announced a campaign for the Democratic nomination for Arizona's 2nd congressional district in the 2026 election.

== Elections ==
- 2016 – Descheenie and Wenona Benally were unopposed in the Democratic Primary and the general election.
- 2014 – Descheenie lost the District 7 senate Democratic primary to incumbent Carlyle Begay. Begay would later switch to the Republican Party in 2015.

== Personal life ==
Descheenie is a single father to three children.
