= Quang Nguyen =

American businessman and politician

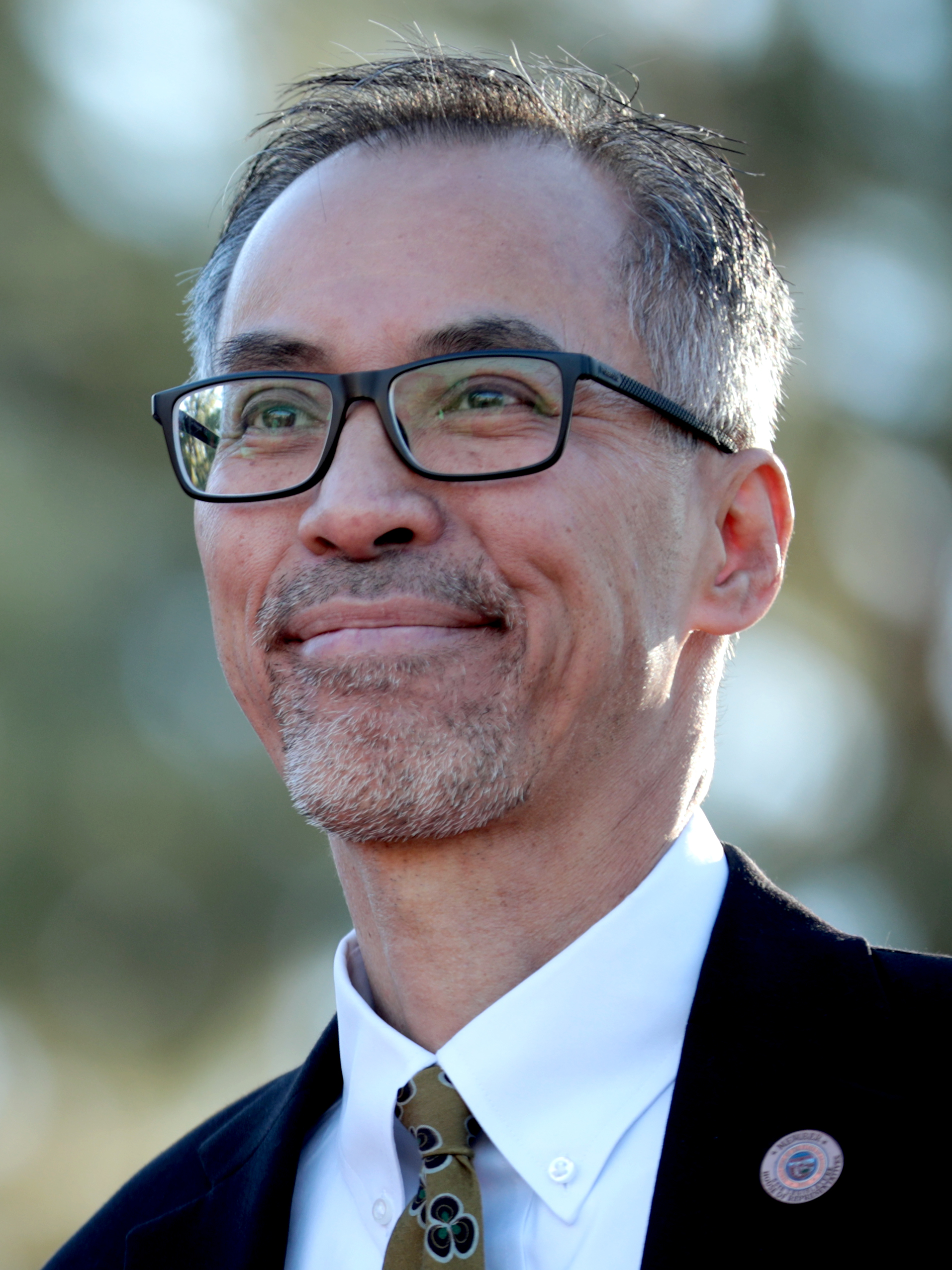
- Nguyen in 2022

Member of the Arizona House of Representatives from the 1st district
- Incumbent
- Assumed office January 11, 2021 Serving with Selina Bliss
- Preceded by: Steve Pierce

Personal details
- Born: 1962 (age 63–64) South Vietnam (present-day Vietnam)
- Party: Republican
- Education: California State University, Long Beach (BA)
- Website: Campaign Website; Legislature Website

Quang Huu Nguyen (Vietnamese: Nguyễn Quang Hữu; born 1962) is a Vietnamese-American businessman and politician serving as a Republican member of the Arizona House of Representatives for District 1 since 2021. The district includes most of Yavapai County and some of Maricopa County.

Nguyen has served as chair of the House Judiciary Committee since 2022.

== Early life and education ==
Quang Nguyen was born in South Vietnam in 1962 and left at 12 years old after the fall of Saigon. Nguyen graduated from California State University, Long Beach with a bachelor's degree in technology education.

== Early career ==
Prior to becoming an elected official, Nguyen founded marketing firm Caddis Advertising. He was also active in public speaking and conservative causes.

== Arizona House of Representatives ==
Nguyen first ran for Arizona House of Representatives in District 1 in 2020. He placed first in a crowded Republican primary with 30.4% of the total vote. Along with Judy Burges, he won the general election and defeated Democrat Judy Stahl. Nguyen was reelected in 2022.

=== Tenure ===
Amid the COVID-19 pandemic in Arizona, Nguyen signed onto a letter urging Governor Doug Ducey to punish school districts that enforce a mask mandate on students.

Nguyen is anti-abortion, anti-vaccine card, and supports tax cuts. He strongly opposes communism, citing his experience living in Saigon during the Vietnam War. In November 2021, he sponsored House Bill (HB) 2008 that would require the Arizona State Board of Education to update high school civics curriculum to include anti-communist narratives from people who, like Nguyen, fled communist countries. On its initial third hearing, the legislation failed to pass the Senate floor, but on reconsideration, it passed with 16 ayes and 12 nays. Ducey signed it into law on June 17, 2022.

Following his reelection in 2022, Quang was appointed chair of the House Judiciary Committee.

=== Committee assignments ===
In the fifty-fifth Legislature session (2021-2023), Nguyen served on the following committees

- Military Affairs and Public Safety (Vice-chairman)
- Appropriations
- Education
- Judiciary

=== Electoral history ===
2020 Arizona House of Representatives District 1 general election
Party	Candidate	Votes	%
Republican	Judy Burges	92,058	40.8%
Republican	Quang Nguyen	86,405	38.3%
Democratic	Judy Stahl	47,204	20.9%
Total votes		225,667	100%
Republican hold			
Republican hold			

2022 Arizona House of Representatives District 1 general election
Party	Candidate	Votes	%
Republican	Quang Nguyen (incumbent)	75,106	33.18
Republican	Selina Bliss	74,731	33.01
Democratic	Cathy Ransom	39,665	17.52
Democratic	Neil Sinclair	36,867	16.29
Total votes		226,369	100%
Republican hold			
Republican hold			

== Personal life ==
Nguyen is Catholic. He lives in Prescott Valley with his wife Mai, a registered nurse. Their daughter is in the United States Navy.
