= Jasmine Blackwater-Nygren =

American politician

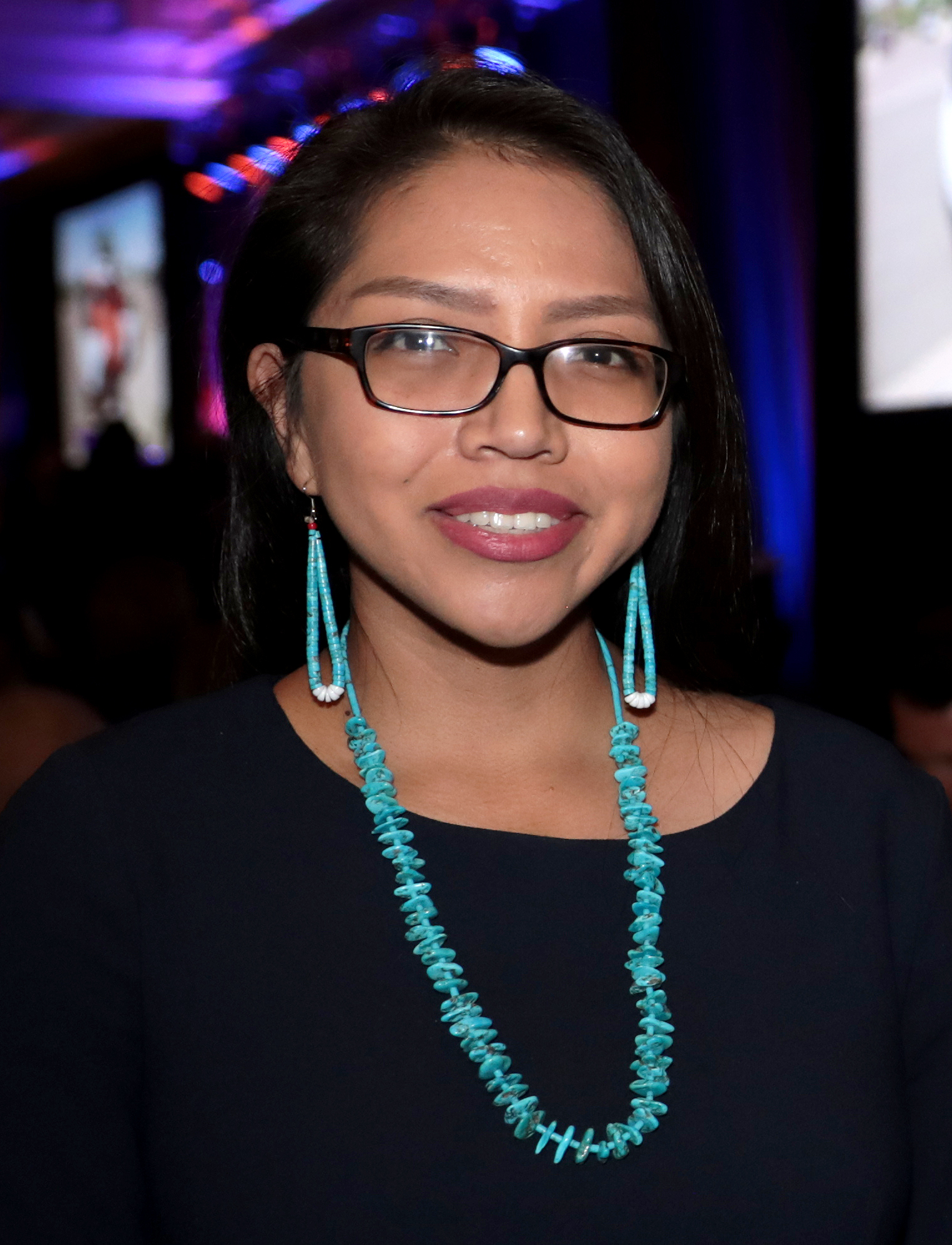
- Blackwater-Nygren in 2022

County Attorney of Apache County
- Incumbent
- Assumed office December 16, 2024
- Preceded by: Michael Whiting

First Lady of the Navajo Nation
- Incumbent
- Assumed office January 10, 2023
- President: Buu Nygren
- Preceded by: Phefelia Nez

Member of the Arizona House of Representatives from the 7th district
- In office February 9, 2021 – January 9, 2023 Serving with Myron Tsosie
- Preceded by: Arlando Teller
- Succeeded by: David Marshall

Personal details
- Born: Jasmine Blackwater; April 18, 1995 (age 31)
- Party: Democratic
- Spouse: Buu Nygren
- Education: Stanford University (BA); Arizona State University (JD)

Jasmine Blackwater-Nygren (née Blackwater; born 1995/1996) is an American politician who has served as the First Lady of Navajo Nation since 2023. She also served as a member of the Arizona House of Representatives from the 7th legislative district from 2021 to 2023, when she was the youngest lawmaker in Arizona.

In December 2024, she was appointed as the Apache County Attorney, becoming the first woman and Indigenous person to hold this position.

== Political career ==
Blackwater-Nygren was appointed to Arizona's 7th legislative district after Democrat Arlando Teller resigned to take a position in the United States Department of Transportation. She did not run for election in 2022.

In December 2024, following the suspension of Michael Whiting due to investigations into alleged misuse of county funds and threats against political opponents, Blackwater-Nygren was appointed as Apache County Attorney by the Board of Supervisors. She was selected over two other candidates, Devin Brown and Criss Candelaria, with a 2–1 vote. Concerns were raised about potential conflicts of interest due to her role as First Lady of the Navajo Nation and her residence in Red Mesa. Blackwater-Nygren addressed these concerns by committing to recuse herself from any conflicts and emphasizing her frequent presence in Window Rock, close to the county seat in St. Johns. Her stated priorities include enhancing public safety, filling staff vacancies, and improving office morale.

== Personal life ==
Blackwater-Nygren is a member of the Navajo Nation and is married to Buu Nygren, who became President of the Navajo Nation on January 10, 2023.

== See also ==
- List of Native American politicians
- Native American women in politics

Assembly seats
Preceded by Arlando Teller	Member of the Arizona House of Representatives from the 7th district 2021–2023	Succeeded by David Marshall
Legal offices
Preceded by Michael Whiting	Apache County Attorney; 2024–present	Incumbent
Honorary titles
Preceded by Phefelia Nez	First Lady of the Navajo Nation; 2023–present	Incumbent
