= 2020 Arizona Senate election =

- November 3, 2020

All 30 seats in the Arizona Senate 16 seats needed for a majority
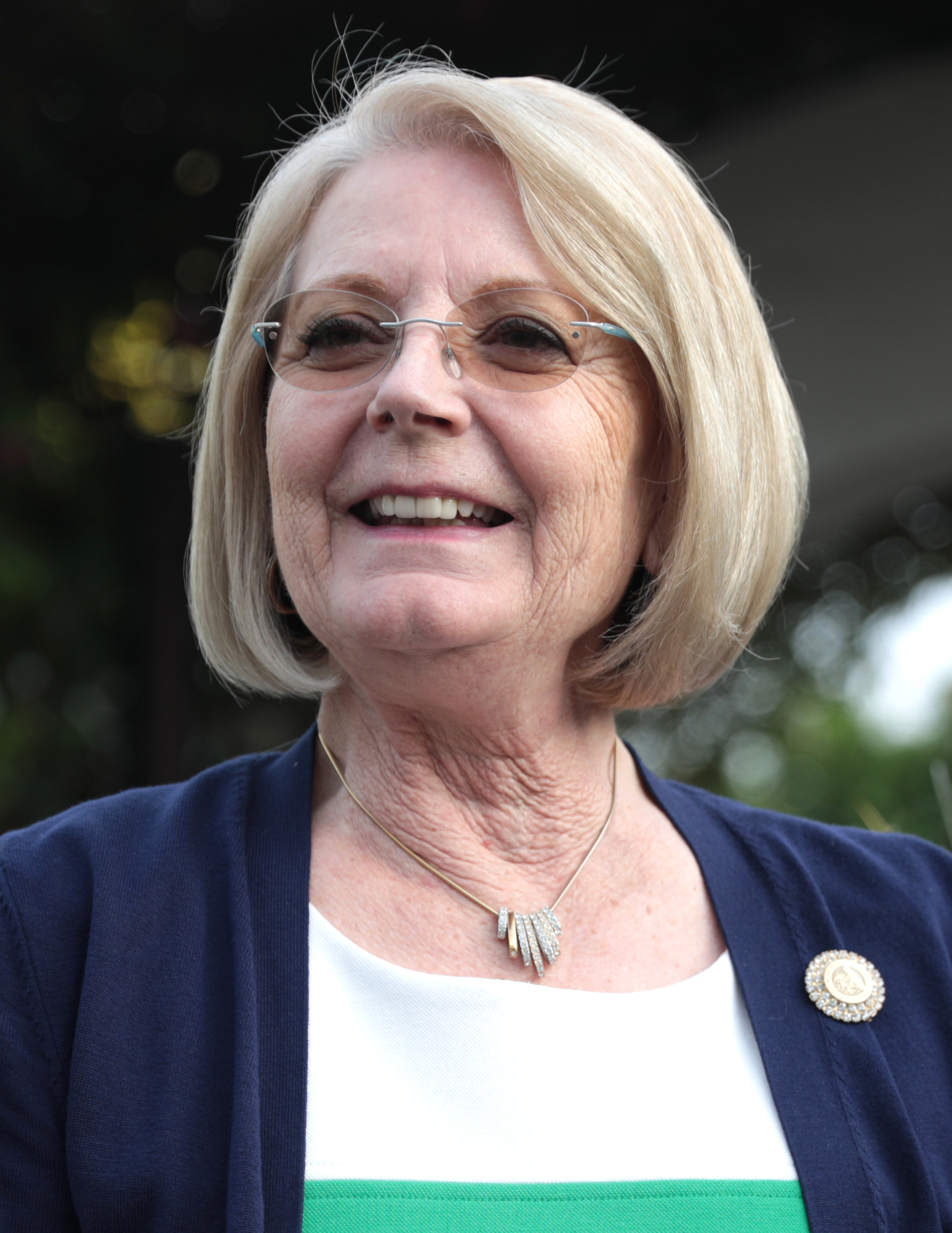

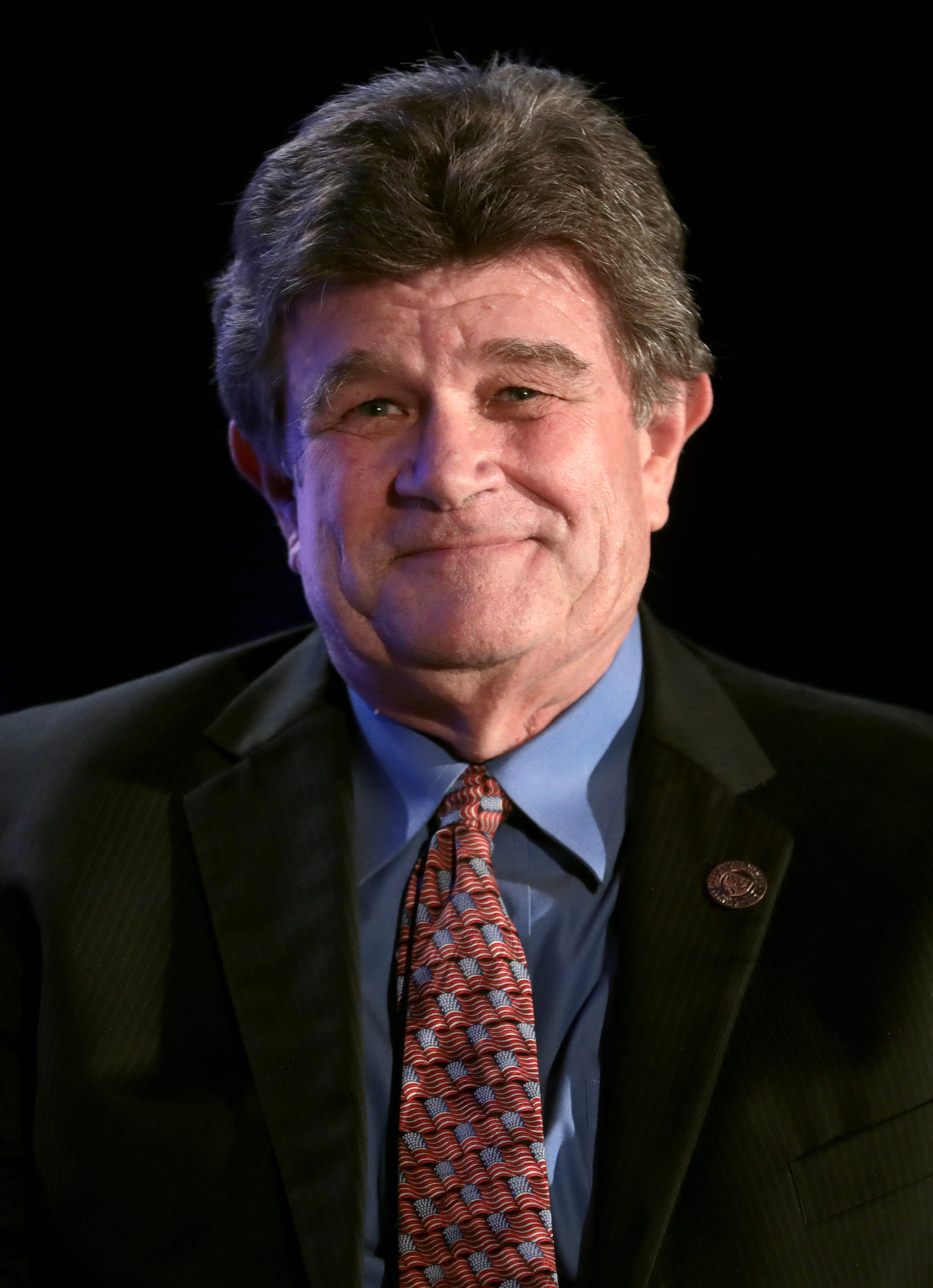
	Majority party	Minority party
Leader	Karen Fann	David Bradley (retired)
Party	Republican	Democratic
Leader since	January 7, 2019	January 14, 2019
Leader's seat	1st district	10th district
Seats before	17	13
Seats after	16	14
Seat change	▼1	▲1
Popular vote	1,499,976	1,472,482
Percentage	50.5%	49.5%
- Democratic gain Democratic hold Republican hold 50–60% 60–70% 70–80% >90% 50–60% 60–70% 70–80% >90%
President of the Senate before election
Karen Fann
Republican
Elected President of the Senate
Karen Fann
Republican

The 2020 Arizona Senate elections was held on November 3, 2020, as part of the biennial 2020 United States elections. Arizona voters elected state senators in all of the state's 30 senate districts. State senators serve two-year terms in the Arizona Senate, with all of the seats up for election each cycle. The primary elections on August 4, 2020, determined which candidates appeared on the general election ballot.

Following the previous election in 2018, Republicans had control of the Arizona Senate with 17 seats to Democrats' 13 seats.

== Predictions ==
Source	Ranking	As of
The Cook Political Report	Tossup	October 21, 2020

== Overview ==
Party	Candidates	Votes		Seats		
Party	Candidates	No.	%	Before	After	+/–
Republican	25	1,499,976	50.46	17	16	▼1
Democratic	25	1,472,482	49.54	13	14	▲1
Total		2,972,458	100.00	30	30	

=== Closest races ===
Seats where the margin of victory was under 10%:

1. State Senate district 28, 0.4% (gain)
2. State Senate district 20, 4.6%
3. State Senate district 17, 5.1%
4. State Senate district 6, 9.4%

== Retiring incumbents ==
=== Democrats ===
- District 2: Andrea Dalessandro was term-limited and ran for the Arizona House of Representatives.
- District 10: David Bradley retired.

=== Republicans ===
- District 8: Frank Pratt retired to run for his old seat in the Arizona House of Representatives.
- District 12: Eddie Farnsworth retired.
- District 16: David Farnsworth retired.

== Results ==
=== District 1 ===
2020 Arizona's 1st Senate district election
Party	Candidate	Votes	%
Republican	Karen Fann	105,712	72.5%
Democratic	Gilbert Carillo	40,063	27.5%
Total votes		145,775	100%
Republican hold			

=== District 2 ===
2020 Arizona's 2nd Senate district election
Party	Candidate	Votes	%
Democratic	Rosanna Gabaldón	52,333	61.0%
Republican	Mark Workman	33,463	39.0%
Total votes		85,796	100%
Democratic hold			

=== District 3 ===
2020 Arizona's 3rd Senate district election
Party	Candidate	Votes	%
Democratic	Sally Ann Gonzales	62,785	100%
Total votes		62,785	100%
Democratic hold			

=== District 4 ===
2020 Arizona's 4th Senate district election
Party	Candidate	Votes	%
Democratic	Lisa Otondo	41,045	56.2%
Republican	Travis Angry	32,045	43.8%
Total votes		73,090	100%
Democratic hold			

=== District 5 ===
2020 Arizona's 5th Senate district election
Party	Candidate	Votes	%
Republican	Sonny Borelli	87,558	99.2%
Total votes		87,558	99.2%
Republican hold			

=== District 6 ===
==== Republican primary ====
Republican primary results
Party	Candidate	Votes	%
Republican	Wendy Rogers	19,363	59.19
Republican	Sylvia Allen (incumbent)	13,349	40.81
Total votes		32,712	100%

==== General election ====
2020 Arizona's 6th Senate district election
Party	Candidate	Votes	%
Republican	Wendy Rogers	67,379	54.7%
Democratic	Felicia French	55,833	45.3%
Total votes		123,212	100%
Republican hold			

=== District 7 ===
2020 Arizona's 7th Senate district election
Party	Candidate	Votes	%
Democratic	Jamescity Peshlakai	62,824	100%
Total votes		62,824	100%
Democratic hold			

=== District 8 ===
2020 Arizona's 8th Senate district election
Party	Candidate	Votes	%
Republican	Thomas "T.J." Shope	50,639	58.5%
Democratic	Barbara McGuire	35,963	41.5%
Total votes		86,602	100%
Republican hold			

=== District 9 ===
2020 Arizona's 9th Senate district election
Party	Candidate	Votes	%
Democratic	Victoria Steele	83,482	100%
Total votes		83,482	100%
Democratic hold			

=== District 10 ===
2020 Arizona's 10th Senate district election
Party	Candidate	Votes	%
Democratic	Kirsten Engel	67,320	58.7%
Republican	Justine Wadsack	47,394	41.3%
Total votes		114,714	100%
Democratic hold			

=== District 11 ===
2020 Arizona's 11th Senate district election
Party	Candidate	Votes	%
Republican	Venden "Vince" Leach	72,563	54.4%
Democratic	JoAnna Mendoza	60,818	45.6%
Total votes		133,381	100%
Republican hold			

=== District 12 ===
2020 Arizona's 12th Senate district election
Party	Candidate	Votes	%
Republican	Warren Peterson	96,149	61.6%
Democratic	Lynsey Robinson	59,852	38.4%
Total votes		156,001	100%
Republican hold			

=== District 13 ===
2020 Arizona's 13th Senate district election
Party	Candidate	Votes	%
Republican	Sine Kerr	93,388	99.8%
Total votes		93,388	99.8%
Republican hold			

=== District 14 ===
2020 Arizona's 14th Senate district election
Party	Candidate	Votes	%
Republican	David Gowan	67,229	63.4%
Democratic	Bob Karb	38,829	36.6%
Total votes		106,058	100%
Republican hold			

=== District 15 ===
==== General election ====
2020 Arizona's 15th Senate district election
Party	Candidate	Votes	%
Republican	Nancy Barto	91,249	98.6%
Total votes		91,249	98.6%
Republican hold			

=== District 16 ===
2020 Arizona's 16th Senate district election
Party	Candidate	Votes	%
Republican	Kelly Townsend	94,913	96.8%
Total votes		94,913	96.8%
Republican hold			

=== District 17 ===
2020 Arizona's 17th Senate district election
Party	Candidate	Votes	%
Republican	J.D. Mesnard	67,889	52.5%
Democratic	Ajlan "A.J." Kurdoglu	61,363	47.5%
Total votes		129,252	100%
Republican hold			

=== District 18 ===
2020 Arizona's 18th Senate district election
Party	Candidate	Votes	%
Democratic	Sean Bowie	75,013	58.1%
Republican	Suzanne Sharer	54,066	41.9%
Total votes		129,079	100%
Democratic hold			

=== District 19 ===
2020 Arizona's 19th Senate district election
Party	Candidate	Votes	%
Democratic	Lupe Contreras Chavira	53,794	100%
Total votes		53,794	100%
Democratic hold			

=== District 20 ===
2020 Arizona's 20th Senate district election
Party	Candidate	Votes	%
Republican	Paul Boyer	52,734	52.3%
Democratic	Douglas Ervin	48,059	47.7%
Total votes		100,793	100%
Republican hold			

=== District 21 ===
2020 Arizona's 21st Senate district election
Party	Candidate	Votes	%
Republican	Rick Gray	75,864	100%
Total votes		75,864	100%
Republican hold			

=== District 22 ===
==== General election ====
2020 Arizona's 22nd Senate district election
Party	Candidate	Votes	%
Republican	David Livingston	97,386	63.6%
Democratic	Sarah Tyree	55,653	36.4%
Total votes		153,039	100%
Republican hold			

=== District 23 ===
==== General election ====
2020 Arizona's 23rd Senate district election
Party	Candidate	Votes	%
Republican	Michelle Ugenti-Rita	89,677	59.1%
Democratic	Seth Blattman	62,115	40.9%
Total votes		151,792	100%
Republican hold			

=== District 24 ===
==== General election ====
2020 Arizona's 24th Senate district election
Party	Candidate	Votes	%
Democratic	Lela Alston	66,719	70.9%
Republican	Ray Michaels	27,402	29.1%
Total votes		94,121	100%
Democratic hold			

=== District 25 ===
2020 Arizona's 25th Senate district election
Party	Candidate	Votes	%
Republican	Tyler Pace	70,046	61.2%
Democratic	Paul Weigel	44,443	38.8%
Total votes		114,489	100%
Republican hold			

=== District 26 ===
==== General election ====
2020 Arizona's 26th Senate district election
Party	Candidate	Votes	%
Democratic	Juan Mendez	49,806	67.1%
Republican	Jae Chin	24,385	32.9%
Total votes		74,191	100%
Democratic hold			

=== District 27 ===
2020 Arizona's 27th Senate district election
Party	Candidate	Votes	%
Democratic	Rebecca Rios	57,027	76.9%
Republican	Garland Shreves	17,087	23.1%
Total votes		74,114	100%
Democratic hold			

=== District 28 ===
2020 Arizona's 28th Senate district election
Party	Candidate	Votes	%
Democratic	Christine Marsh	60,339	50.2%
Republican	Kate McGee Brophy	59,842	49.8%
Total votes		120,181	100%
Democratic gain from Republican			

=== District 29 ===
2020 Arizona's 29th Senate district election
Party	Candidate	Votes	%
Democratic	Martín J. Quezada	41,272	70.4%
Republican	John Wilson	17,305	29.5%
Total votes		58,577	100%
Democratic hold			

=== District 30 ===
2020 Arizona's 30th Senate district election
Party	Candidate	Votes	%
Democratic	Otoniel "Tony" Navarrete	42,344	100%
Total votes		42,344	100%
Democratic hold			

== See also ==
- 2020 Arizona House of Representatives election
- 2020 United States elections
- 2020 Arizona Democratic presidential primary
- 2020 United States Senate election in Arizona
- 2020 United States House of Representatives elections in Arizona
- Arizona Senate
- Elections in Arizona
