= Arlando Teller =

American politician

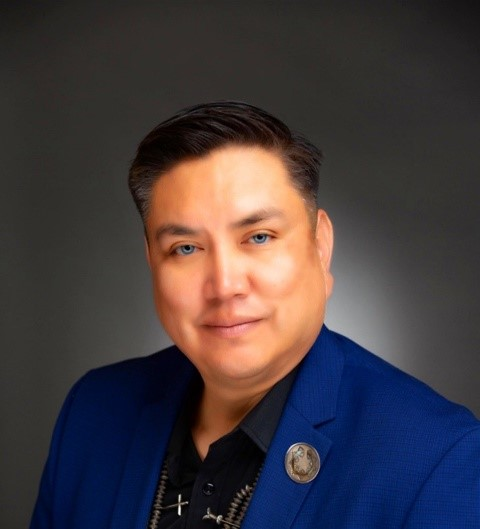
- Teller in 2023

Assistant Secretary of Transportation for Tribal Government Affairs
- In office March 31, 2023 – January 20, 2025
- Preceded by: position established

Member of the Arizona House of Representatives from the 7th district
- In office January 14, 2019 – February 1, 2021 Serving with Myron Tsosie
- Preceded by: Wenona Benally
- Succeeded by: Jasmine Blackwater-Nygren

Personal details
- Party: Democratic

Arlando Teller is an American politician who had served as the assistant secretary for tribal government affairs in the U.S. Department of Transportation. He was previously a Democratic member of the Arizona House of Representatives from 2019 to 2021.

== Biography ==
Teller graduated from Embry-Riddle Aeronautical University in 1995. He was deputy director of the Navajo Department of Transportation prior to running for public office.

Teller was elected in 2018 as a Democratic member of the Arizona House of Representatives representing District 7, succeeding retiring State Representative Wenona Benally. Teller served from January 14, 2019, until his resignation on February 1, 2021.

Teller was appointed deputy assistant secretary for tribal affairs in the United States Department of Transportation in February 2021. He was appointed as assistant secretary of tribal government affairs on March 31, 2023, after the assistant secretary position was established by the Infrastructure Investment and Jobs Act.

== Personal life ==
Teller is a member of the Navajo Nation.
