= Sylvia Allen =

American politician (born 1947)

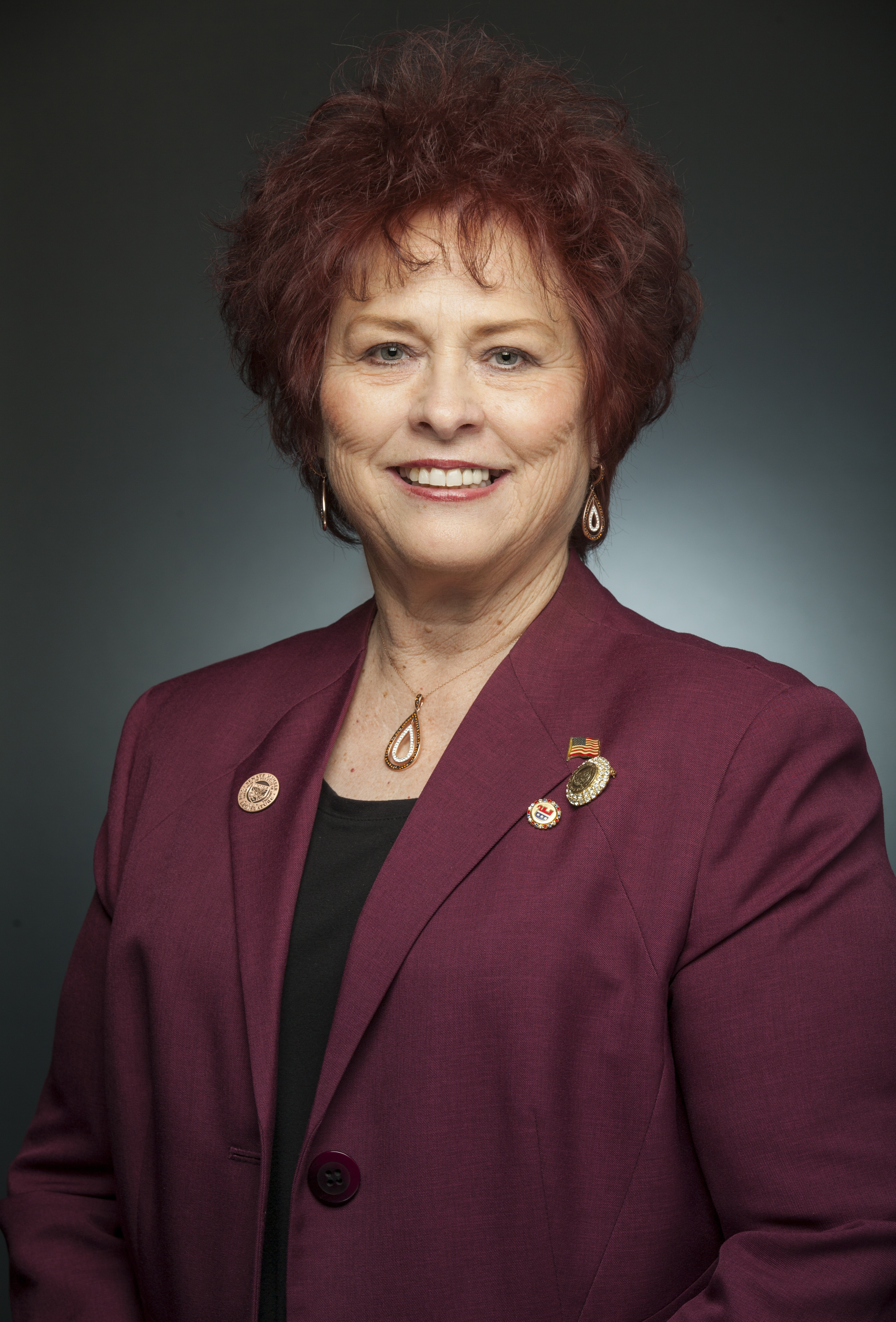

Member of the Arizona House of Representatives from the 7th district
- Incumbent
- Assumed office April 29, 2026 Serving with Walter Blackman
- Preceded by: David Marshall

Member of the Arizona Senate
- In office January 5, 2015 – January 10, 2021
- Preceded by: Alice Crandell
- Succeeded by: Wendy Rogers
- Constituency: 6th district
- In office June 2008 – January 2012
- Preceded by: Jake Flake
- Succeeded by: Chester Crandell
- Constituency: 5th district

Personal details
- Born: April 2, 1947 (age 79) Phoenix, Arizona, U.S.
- Party: Republican
- Spouse: Richard Allen
- Children: 5
- Profession: Small business owner, real estate agent, charter school owner
- Website: Senate Website

Sylvia Tenney Allen (born April 2, 1947) is an American politician from Arizona. She has served as a Republican member Arizona House of Representatives since 2026. She previously served in the Arizona State Senate from 2008 to 2012 and again from 2015 to 2021.

== Education ==
Sylvia Allen holds a high school diploma from Snowflake High School, in Snowflake, Arizona.

== Career ==
She is a co-founder and co-owner of George Washington Academy, LLC, a charter school in Snowflake, Arizona.

She served as a Navajo County Supervisor.

A Republican party activist, in 2008 she was appointed to the Arizona State Senate following the departure of Senator Jake Flake. A resident of Snowflake, Arizona, she first represented the 5th legislative district.

Following her appointment, she was elected in her own right in 2008. In the 2009–10 legislature, she was a member of four standing committees: Appropriations; Education Accountability and Reform; Natural Resources, Infrastructure, and Public Debt; and the Appropriations Subcommittee on Health and Welfare. She served as chair of the Appropriations Subcommittee on Health and Welfare for the Arizona Senate.

Allen was a sponsor of a 2012 bill, SB 1127, that introduced shared parenting to Arizona.

After the death of Chester Crandell, Allen was selected to replace him on the primary ballot and was elected to the Arizona State Senate District 6 seat in 2014, taking office on January 5, 2015. In the 2015 legislative session, Allen served on the Appropriations, Education, Government (Vice-Chair), Rural Affairs and Environment (Chair), Rules, Water and Energy (Vice-Chair) committees. She was selected by her caucus as President Pro tem.

For the 2015-16 term, Allen served as President Pro Tem and as Chairman of the Senate Education Committee, where she has played a role in securing funding increases for Arizona universities and K-12 schools, the passage of Prop 123 ($3.5 billion increase in K-12 funding over 10 years), and was awarded Legislator of the Year by Arizona Community Colleges and Champion of Education by the Arizona School Administrators. Other awards Allen has won include Friend of the Family from the Arizona Family Project and Champion of the Taxpayer from Americans for Prosperity. Allen also has an "A" rating from the NRA Political Victory Fund. Her term ended on January 1, 2017. In 2017, the American Conservative Union gave her a lifetime evaluation of 92%.

Allen was defeated in her bid for re-election in 2020, losing to Wendy Rogers in the Republican primary.

== Controversies ==
Speaking at a June 2009 Rural Development and Retirement Committee hearing regarding a uranium mine, Allen said the world was "6,000 years old."

During her tenure as a county supervisor, Allen was said to have attempted to interfere with an internal investigation into the conduct of her son-in-law, a detention officer, with female inmates in the Navajo County jail, where he worked. K.C. Clark, the Navajo County Sheriff, threatened to arrest her if she continued to interfere. According to the White Mountain Independent "Former Navajo County detention officer Tim Hunt was first terminated and then allowed to resign last year after allegations he had sexual contact with inmates in exchange for contraband. Hunt is Sylvia Allen's son-in-law." In March 2015, Allen filed a senate bill that would provide detention officers, like her son-in-law, with greater protections from disciplinary investigations.

During a March 2015 Senate committee hearing on a bill that would relax concealed carry restrictions pertaining to public buildings, Allen, a member of the LDS Church, suggested that attending Sunday church services should be compulsory for Americans. Arizona state senate Democrat Steve Farley argued that even if church attendance might prove beneficial for society at large, Allen's proposal was a clear violation of the separation of church and state laws, including the First Amendment to the US Constitution.

In 2017, while Chairwoman of the Arizona Senate Education Committee, the George Washington Academy charter school, of which she is a co-owner and co-founder, received an "F" grade from the Arizona Department of Education. Allen continues to deny she owns the George Washington Academy, but the Arizona Corporation Commission (ACC) still lists Allen as the owner of the academy. “On our records, she is an owner of this company,” said Patricia Barfield, ACC corporations division director. Allen was the statutory agent who filled out the Articles of Organization in 2014. She also signed the Affidavit of Publication. She’s also listed as one of the officers for GWA LLC along with Kathleen Danielson and Kellee Hunt.

In part of a speech she gave in July 2019, Allen lamented the "browning" of the United States, claiming that the country would "look like South American countries very quickly", and complained that immigrants failed to "learn the principles of our country". When contacted by media outlets, Allen attempted to clarify by saying the reason this concerned her was that she viewed many South American countries as "socialist". These remarks were quickly denounced by many Arizona Democrats. Within the same speech, Allen claimed that "our boys are struggling to know how to be men" due to "this feminist movement" which was "destroying our families", and denounced the Equal Rights Amendment.

In January 2020, Allen introduced a bill to ban the word "Homosexuality" from Arizona's SexEd curriculum.
