= Selina Bliss =

American politician

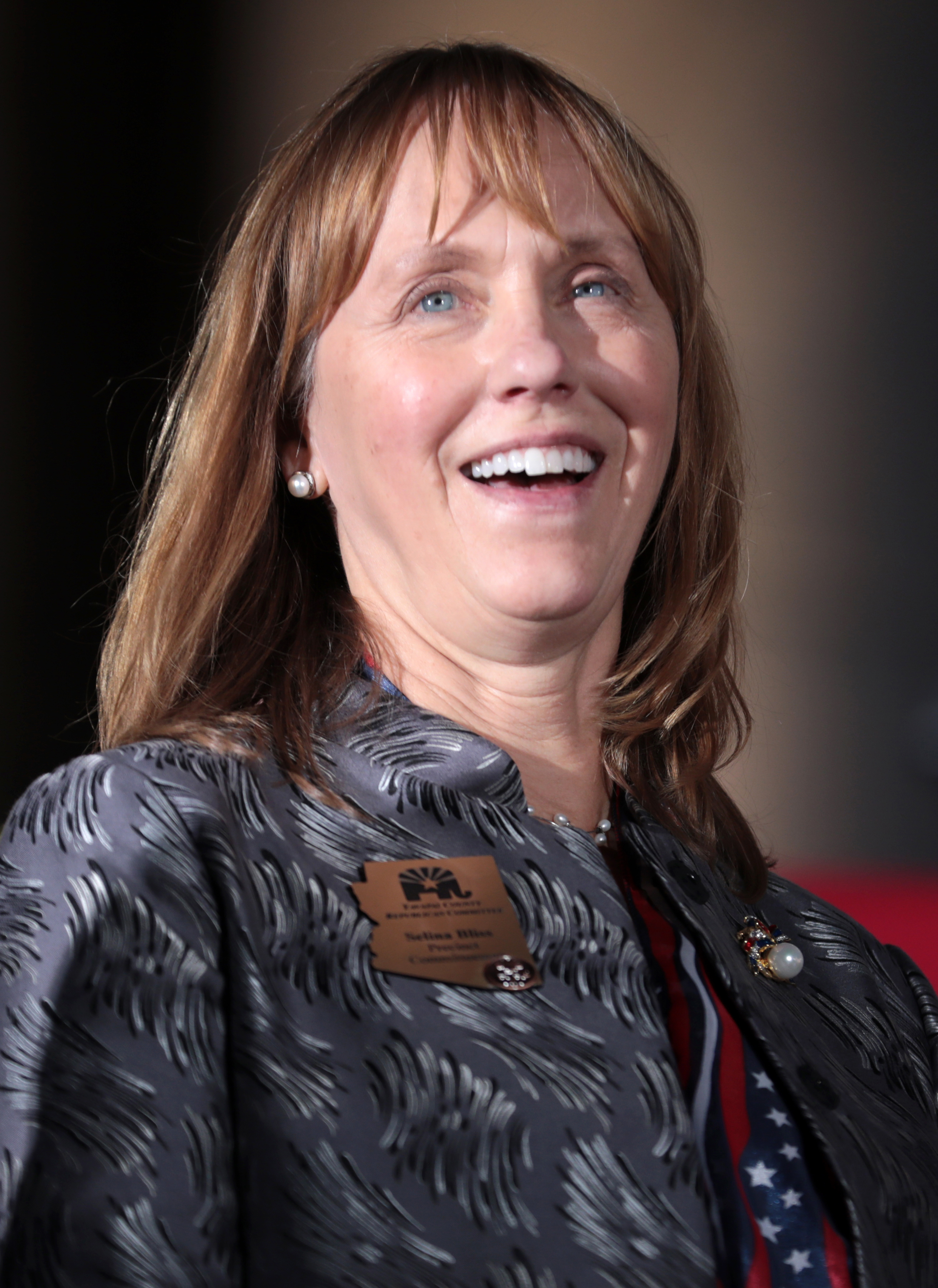
- Bliss in 2022

Member of the Arizona House of Representatives from the 1st district
- Incumbent
- Assumed office January 9, 2023 Serving with Quang Nguyen
- Preceded by: Judy Burges

Personal details
- Party: Republican
- Education: Arizona State University; Capella University
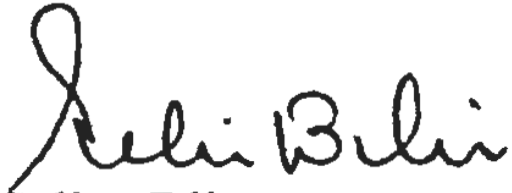
- Signature
- Website: Campaign Website

Selina Bliss is an American politician, nurse and a Republican member of the Arizona House of Representatives elected to represent District 1 in 2022.

== Education ==
Bliss graduated from Arizona State University with a masters in nursing. She has a doctorate in nursing from Capella University.

== Elections ==
In 2022, Bliss and Quang Nguyen won a four-way contest in the Republican primary, defeating incumbent state representative Judy Burges. They went on to defeat Democrats Cathy Ransom and Neil Sinclair in the general election.
