= Rick Wiles =

American conspiracy theorist and pastor (born 1953)

- Born: August 20, 1953 (age 73); Maryland, U.S.
- Occupation: Radio host
- Years active: 1998–present
- Employers: TruNews: 1998–present (founder); TBN: 1995–1998; CBN: 1984–1995?; CNN/ESPN: early 1980s
- Movement: Conservatism; Christian right; Alt-right; Dominion theology; Far-right
- Website: www.trunews.com

Rick Wiles (born August 20, 1953) is a far-right American conspiracy theorist, pundit, and Christian fundamentalist senior pastor at the nondenominational Flowing Streams Church. He is the founder of TruNews, a website promoting racist, homophobic, and antisemitic conspiracy theories.

Wiles has said that Jews seek to obtain control of countries to "kill millions of Christians", and has claimed that Jews are "deceivers" and that Jews "plot, they lie, they do whatever they have to do to accomplish their political agenda". In February 2020, YouTube permanently banned the TruNews channel.

== Career ==
Before becoming a radio host, Wiles worked as an advertising and marketing sales manager for CNN and ESPN in the early 1980s, and in 1984 joined the Christian Broadcasting Network as their first National Cable Marketing Manager. In 1995, he was hired as the Marketing Director for Trinity Broadcasting Network. He resigned from the network in September 1998.

Wiles previously broadcast his radio show on WRMI (Radio Miami International), but now has adopted the internet as the primary platform, with shortwave radio also hosting.

=== TruNews ===
Wiles founded the organization later to be called TruNews in September 1998, in Dallas/Fort Worth, Texas. On May 24, 1999, the organization, then named America's Hope, made its first broadcast. After five years of regular broadcasts, the news station changed its name to America Freedom News for a brief period. Wiles later changed it a second time to its current name, TruNews. It has also been known as Christian News Channel.

TruNews is known for promoting racist and antisemitic conspiracy theories and medical misinformation. Regarding the September 11 attacks in 2001, Wiles said: "[9/11] wasn't done by the Muslims. It was done by a wildcard, the Israeli Mossad, that's cunning and ruthless and can carry out attacks on Americans and make it look like Arabs did it." TruNews frequently described Barack Obama as a "demon from hell". Obama, he claimed while the former president was in office, was the "jihadist-in-chief" who was "waging jihad against the United States from inside the White House" and murdered Supreme Court Justice Antonin Scalia as a "pagan sacrifice."

Via Twitter in November 2019, TruNews said its channel had been suspended by YouTube. It was removed for violating YouTube's rules on hate speech. Wiles has denied his rhetoric has antisemitic intent: "It's hard to say. I don't know. I can tell you from my heart there is no ill will toward the Jewish people, with all sincerity." He blamed George Soros for organizing a campaign against him. In late February 2020, TruNews was permanently banned from YouTube.

Pastor Rick Wiles has spoken out in defense of Palestinians and against Israeli killings of Palestinian civilians during the Gaza war and the Israeli occupation of the West Bank. Proclaiming, "I am a friend of the Palestinian people. I am not an enemy of the Jews. I am a friend of the Palestinians. I simply want the Jews to treat them like Human."

=== Advocating violence and mass murder ===
In October 2019, Wiles stated that if Trump was defeated in the 2020 presidential election:

there is going to be violence in America. There are people in this country, veterans, cowboys, mountain men, guys that know how to fight, and they're going to make a decision that the people that did this to Donald Trump are not going to get away with it and they're going to hunt them down. If these people in Washington think that they are going to get away with it, it's not going to happen. The Trump supporters are going to hunt them down. It's going to happen and this country is going to be plunged into darkness and they brought it upon themselves because they won't back off.

In late July 2020, Wiles urged Trump to use "billions of hollow-point bullets" against Black Lives Matter protestors in Portland, Oregon to put down the "insurrection". He claimed the bullets were hoarded by Barack Obama "to round up Christians and constitutionalists under a President Hillary Clinton".

In late November 2020, after Trump's defeat was confirmed, Wiles stated that the Trump administration planned "to shoot some people". He said:

They're going to have a bunch of traitors, they're going to line them up against the wall, and start shooting them, because that's what they deserve. The Democrats, the news media...If the leftists, if the scientists, professors have been working secretly with the Chinese Communist Party, then line them up against a wall and shoot them. That's what you do with them.

=== COVID-19 ===
In March 2020, at a TruNews broadcast, Wiles claimed that the COVID-19 pandemic was God's punishment to Jews for opposing Jesus Christ and the disease spread in synagogues. Wiles also claimed that the outbreak in the United States started at the American Israel Public Affairs Committee conference in Washington, D.C., on March 2, 2020.

Wiles has claimed that the vaccines for protection against coronavirus are a plot for "global genocide" and has opposed vaccination efforts. In late May 2021, it was reported that Wiles himself had contracted COVID-19 and had been hospitalized. He said that his wife was "very fatigued," that his daughter-in-law was hospitalized, and that his grandson and other family members were suffering from coronavirus symptoms.

== Political campaign ==
In 2024, Wiles filed to challenge U.S. Representative Brian Mast in the Republican primary, and denounced Mast for supporting Israel and for having worn an Israel Defense Forces uniform on Capitol Hill.

Wiles lost the primary with 14% of the vote.
