= TruNews =

American far-right fake news website

- Website type: Fake news website; Far-right politics
- Available in: English
- Owner: Rick Wiles
- Website: trunews.com
- Registration: None
- Launched: September 1998; 28 years ago
- Current status: Active

TruNews is an American far-right (Note: Sources describing TruNews as far-right:) fake news website (Note: Sources describing TruNews as a fake news website:) and channel owned and hosted by Rick Wiles. TruNews frequently publishes conspiracy theories in addition to racist, anti-LGBT, antisemitic, and Islamophobic content. It has been designated a hate group by the Southern Poverty Law Center.

== History ==
Wiles founded the organization as America's Hope in September 1998 as a Christian ministry based in the Dallas–Fort Worth area. In the following months, Wiles toured the U.S. speaking of moral decline as he aimed to prevent "economic collapse" and "war on American soil". On May 24, 1999, the organization made its first radio broadcast. After five years of regular broadcasts, the news station briefly changed its name to America Freedom News, before settling on TruNews in 2004.

In November 2019, TruNews was temporarily suspended from YouTube for violating its rules on promoting hate speech. Wiles has denied his rhetoric has antisemitic intent and blamed George Soros for organizing a campaign against him. In February 2020, TruNews was permanently banned from YouTube.

In April 2025, Rick Wiles announced that he was ending Trunews to focus on other activities, and the final episode of Trunews aired on May 2, 2025.

== Content ==
In October 2014, TruNews urged that the spread of Ebola "could solve America's problems with atheism, homosexuality, sexual promiscuity, pornography and abortion". In late January 2020, Wiles said COVID-19 was God's "death angel" and "plagues are one of the last steps of judgment."

TruNews is known for promoting racist and antisemitic conspiracy theories. The website frequently described President Barack Obama as a "demon from hell". Obama, he claimed while the former president was in office, was the "jihadist-in-chief" who was "waging jihad against the United States from inside the White House" and murdered Supreme Court Justice Antonin Scalia as a "pagan sacrifice".

In 2017, TruNews guests included someone who claimed President Bill Clinton was a flesh-eating cannibal, leading to his contracting related diseases. Another asserted that Queen Elizabeth II of the United Kingdom was a "lizard person" who had Diana, Princess of Wales murdered because the Princess was in the process of revealing that the Royal Family was involved in Satanism. He also asserted that Israel and the "Jewish mafia" had President John F. Kennedy assassinated. Another edition of Wiles' program claimed Israel and the "synagogue of Satan" are pushing the United States to fight wars on their behalf.

On TruNews, Wiles has asserted that the effects of Hurricane Harvey upon the city of Houston, Texas, in September 2017 resulted from Houston's "LGBT devotion"; has described Judaism and Islam as "the Antichrist"; has called Central American immigrants a "brown invasion" being used by God to punish White Americans for legal abortion; has claimed that the 2017 Las Vegas shooting was conducted by government death squads from a "gay / lesbian Nazi regime"; and, in July 2018, predicted an imminent coup (led by CNN's Anderson Cooper and MSNBC's Rachel Maddow) that would result in the nationally televised decapitation of the Trump family on the White House lawn.

Wiles promoted antisemitic conspiracy theories of Jewish world domination while discussing the 2019 AIPAC conference on TruNews. In November 2019, he said that the congressional hearings concerning the impeachment of Donald Trump were "infested with Jews" and constituted a "Jew coup". He claimed: "That's the way the Jews work. They are deceivers. They plot, they lie, they do whatever they have to do to accomplish their political agenda" and asserted the United States would reach a state of civil war before Christmas. Millions of Christians would be murdered by Jews as a result. Of the hoax Protocols of the Elders of Zion, Wiles said the authors had "accurately predicted what was going to happen in the world". TruNews and Wiles have also claimed that the transgender rights movement is a Zionist plot to make all of humanity androgynous, that this supposed plot was inspired by Talmudic and Kabbalistic doctrines, and that it involves "putting specific things in food, in drink".

== See also ==
- List of fake news websites
