= Artesia, Arizona =

- Populated place
- Location within Arizona Location within the United States
- Coordinates: 32°41′53″N 109°42′27″W
- Country: United States
- State: Arizona
- County: Graham
- Elevation: 3,271 ft (997 m)
- Time zone: UTC-7 (Mountain (MST))
  - Summer (DST): UTC-7 (MST)
- ZIP codes: 85546
- Area code: 520
- FIPS code: 04-04300
- GNIS feature ID: 24311

Artesia is a populated place situated in Graham County, Arizona, United States.

== History ==
Artesia's population was 106 in 1940.
