= Judy Burges =

American politician (born 1943)

Judy B. Burges

Member of the Arizona House of Representatives from the 1st district
- In office January 11, 2021 – January 9, 2023
- Preceded by: Noel W. Campbell
- Succeeded by: Selina Bliss

Member of the Arizona Senate from the 22nd district
- In office January 23, 2012 – January 14, 2019
- Preceded by: Scott Bundgaard
- Succeeded by: David Livingston

Member of the Arizona House of Representatives from the 4th district
- In office 2005 – January 23, 2012

Personal details
- Born: July 21, 1943 (age 83) La Junta, Colorado, U.S.
- Party: Republican
- Education: University of Phoenix Yavapai College

Judy M. Burges (born July 21, 1943) is a former Republican member of the Arizona House of Representatives, representing District 1, and a former member of the Arizona State Senate representing District 22. She was first appointed to the State Senate by the Maricopa County Board of Supervisors on January 23, 2012.

Burges previously served in the Arizona House of Representatives, representing District 4, from 2005 until her appointment to the State Senate. Senator Burges chaired the Government, Joint Legislative Audit, and Appropriations Committees while serving in the House and served as vice chair for numerous other committees.

== Education ==
Senator Burges graduated from Yavapai College with an AA in General Studies (1984); the for-profit, open enrollment, University of Phoenix with a BA in management (1993) and an MBA in Business Administration (1996).

== Work ==
Burges' professional experience includes working as an Account Clerk with the Yavapai County Government from 1984 to 1996 and Budget Coordinator with the Cyprus Bagdad Copper Company from 1976 to 1981.

== Controversies ==
In 2011, Burges was joined by 30 Arizona Republican lawmakers as co-sponsors of HB 2544, a bill that required presidential candidates to prove that they were born in the United States, are over 35 and have resided in the United States for at least 14 years. This action dovetailed with the birther movement started in 2008 repudiating Barack Obama's natural citizenship. The measure ultimately failed to pass.

In 2013, Burges fought against US involvement with the United Nations initiative, Agenda 21, the Rio declaration of environmental principles, claiming that she would "certainly call it communism." She further falsely claimed that Brazil is a communist nation.

In April 2014, Burges traveled to Nevada and showed support for rancher Cliven Bundy, who was resisting a cattle round-up after refusing to pay grazing fees since 1993. "I stand with them," Burges said of the Bundy family.

In 2017 Burges had an email exchange with an elderly constituent that was widely publicized. The constituent was asking about HB 2404 that required petition gatherers in initiative campaigns be paid by the hour rather than by the signature. Within Burges response, she called the 82-year-old widow and longtime Scottsdale resident a "paid troll."

The American Conservative Union has given her a lifetime rating of 93%.

== Sources ==
- Project Vote Smart bio of Burges
