= Walter Blackman =

American politician

Walt Blackman
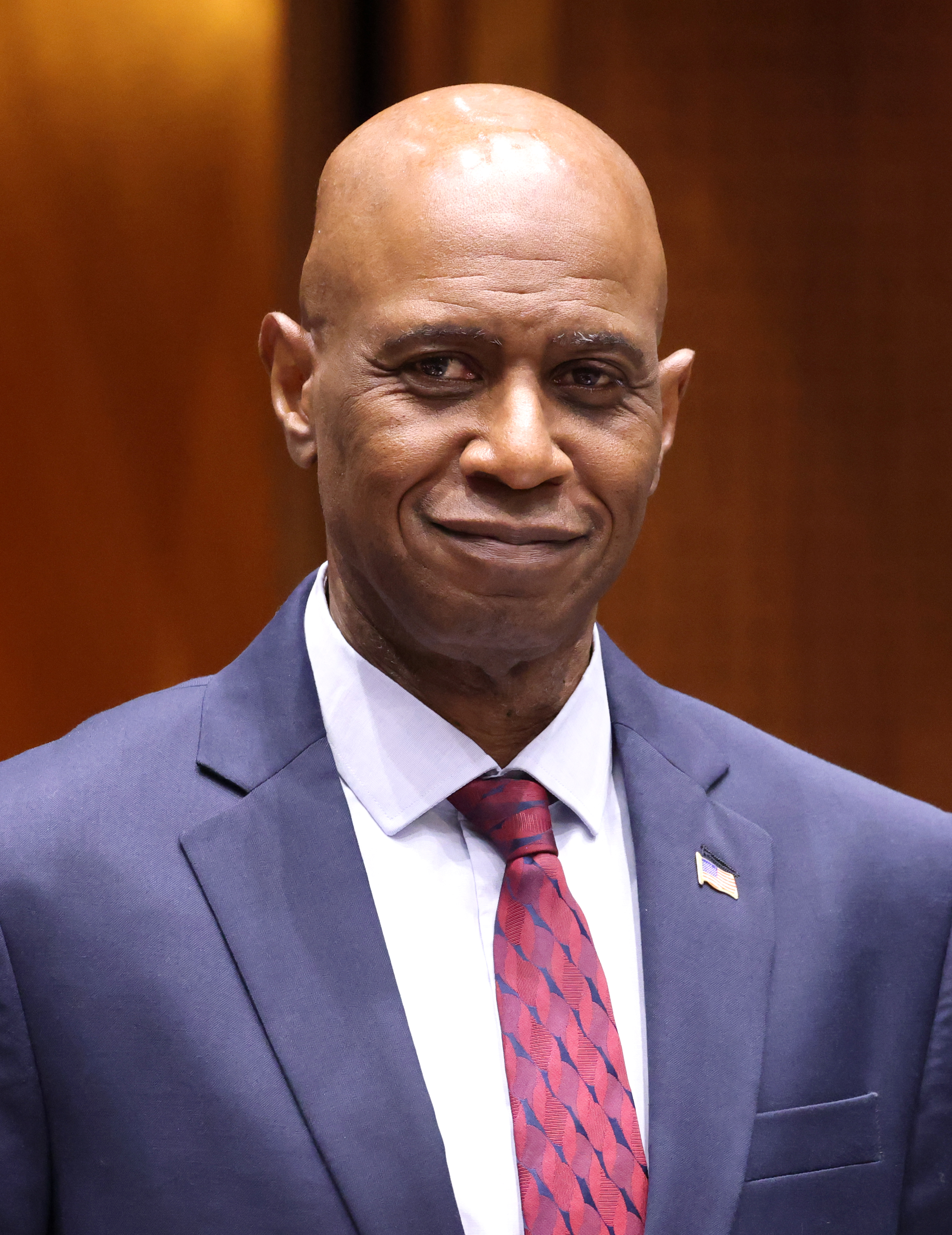
- Blackman in 2025

Member of the Arizona House of Representatives
- Incumbent
- Assumed office January 13, 2025 Serving with Sylvia Allen
- Preceded by: David Cook
- Constituency: 7th district
- In office January 14, 2019 – January 9, 2023 Serving with Brenda Barton
- Preceded by: Brenda Barton
- Succeeded by: Myron Tsosie
- Constituency: 6th district

Personal details
- Born: 1965 or 1966 (age 59–60) Portugal
- Party: Republican
- Spouse: Kristi Blackman
- Children: 5
- Education: Grand Canyon University

Military service
- Allegiance: United States
- Branch/service: United States Army
- Awards: Bronze Star; Meritorious Service Medal

Walter Blackman (born 1965/1966) is an American politician who serves as a member of the Arizona House of Representatives from the 7th district. He previously served in the legislature from 2019 to 2023 for District 6, and was the first black Republican elected to the Arizona State Legislature. Blackman served 21 years in the United States Army, earning a Bronze Star for combat action as a tank commander in Iraq.

== Early life and education ==
Blackman was born on an Army base in Portugal, where his father served as an officer in the United States Air Force Security Forces. He was raised in Wiesbaden, Germany.

== Career ==
Blackman served in the United States Army for 21 years as a front line tank commander, and a sexual harassment and assault prevention Senior Program Manager specialist. He earned a Bronze Star for combat action in Iraq, and a Meritorious Service Medal. From 2016 to 2018, he was the founder, President and Chief Executive Officer of WB Inclusion and Diversity Consulting Firm, LLC in Snowflake, Arizona.

=== Political career ===
Blackman was elected in 2018 to succeed term-limited Arizona State Representative Brenda Barton as a Republican member of the Arizona House of Representatives representing district 6. He was the first black Republican elected to the Arizona Legislature.

He supports criminal justice reform. He is chair of the Ad Hoc Committee on Earned Release Credits for Prisoners, Vice Chair of the Judiciary Committee, Vice Chair of the State and International Affairs Committee, and a Member of the Education Commission of the States, the Government Committee and the Regulatory Affairs Committee. In February 2020, the Arizona House unanimously approved a bill that he had proposed that would give all non-violent-offense state prisoners time off their sentences if they work in prison or take drug treatment or major self-improvement courses in prison.

Commenting on the murder of George Floyd, and also highlighting Floyd's criminal record, Blackman said on Facebook: "I DO NOT support George Floyd and I refuse to see him as a martyr. But I hope his family receives justice." Blackman also called the Black Lives Matter movement a "terrorist organization", likened it to the Ku Klux Klan and questioned whether police brutality existed. In reaction, the Arizona branches of the American Friends Service Committee and the American Civil Liberties Union of Arizona said that they no longer would work with him.

Following the 2020 United States presidential election, Blackman supported the "Stop the Steal" movement which falsely claimed that Donald Trump won the election nationally and in Arizona.

In 2022, Blackman said that he and his family were the victims of a racist smear campaign driven by the far-right website The Gateway Pundit over his refusal to support overturning the 2020 presidential election. He said that, after he gave an interview in which he argued that it would be unconstitutional for state legislators to "decertify" the results of the 2020 presidential election, his daughter received a text message calling him a racial epithet and a "RINO" (Republican in Name Only).

==== 2022 U.S. House campaign ====
In March 2021, Blackman announced his candidacy for Arizona's 2nd congressional district in the 2022 elections.

In a September 2021 speech, Blackman said, "The Proud Boys came to one of my events and that was one of the proudest moments of my life." When asked to comment on his remarks, Blackman condemned the Proud Boys, a far-right group that engages in political violence, saying, "At the time of the rally, [I] wasn't familiar with the totality and breadth of the Proud Boys conduct, which I unequivocally condemn."

In a seven-way Republican primary race, Blackman finished second to winner Eli Crane.

==== 2024 State House campaign ====
In January 2023, Blackman announced his campaign for a third non-consecutive term in the State House. After redistricting, his new district contains more of Pinal County. He won the general election in November 2024, and was sworn in on January 13, 2025.

== Personal life ==
Blackman and his wife have five children. His wife works at the Northern Arizona Council of Government.

== See also ==
- List of African-American Republicans
