= Arizona's 7th legislative district =

American legislative district

- Map of District 7: Approved January 21, 2022
- Senator: Wendy Rogers (R)
- House members: Walter Blackman (R); David Marshall (R)
- Registration: 47.38% Republican; 20.96% Democratic; 30.06% Other
- Demographics: 71% White; 2% Black/African American; 5% Native American; 2% Asian; 19% Hispanic
- Population: 240,214
- Voting-age population: 199,383
- Registered voters: 154,195

Arizona's 7th legislative district is one of 30 in the state, consisting of sections of Coconino County, Gila County, Navajo County, and Pinal County. As of 2023, there are 95 precincts in the district, with a total registered voter population of 154,195. The district has an overall population of 240,214.

Following the 2020 United States redistricting cycle, the Arizona Independent Redistricting Commission (AIRC) redrew legislative district boundaries in Arizona. According to the AIRC, the district is outside of competitive range and considered leaning Republican.

== Political representation ==
The district is represented in the 57th Arizona State Legislature, which convenes from January 1, 2025, to December 31, 2026, by Wendy Rogers (R-Flagstaff) in the Arizona Senate and by Walter Blackman (R) and David Marshall (R-Snowflake) in the Arizona House of Representatives.

Name	Image	Residence	Office	Party
Wendy Rogers		Flagstaff	State senator	Republican
Walter Blackman		Snowflake	State representative	Republican
David Marshall		Snowflake	State representative	Republican

== Election results ==
The 2022 elections were the first in the newly drawn district.

=== Arizona Senate ===
2022 Arizona's 7th Senate district election
Party	Candidate	Votes	%
Republican	Wendy Rogers (incumbent)	63,019	63.62
Democratic	Kyle Nitschke	36,030	36.38
Total votes		99,049	100
Republican hold			

=== Arizona House of Representatives ===
2022 Arizona's 7th House of Representatives district election
Party	Candidate	Votes	%
Republican	David Cook	59,974	52.58
Republican	David Marshall	52,893	46.37
Total votes		112,867	100.00
Republican hold			
Republican hold			

== See also ==
- List of Arizona legislative districts
- Arizona State Legislature
