= 2026 Arizona House of Representatives election =

2026 Arizona House of Representatives elections
- November 3, 2026

All 60 seats in the Arizona House of Representatives 31 seats needed for a majority
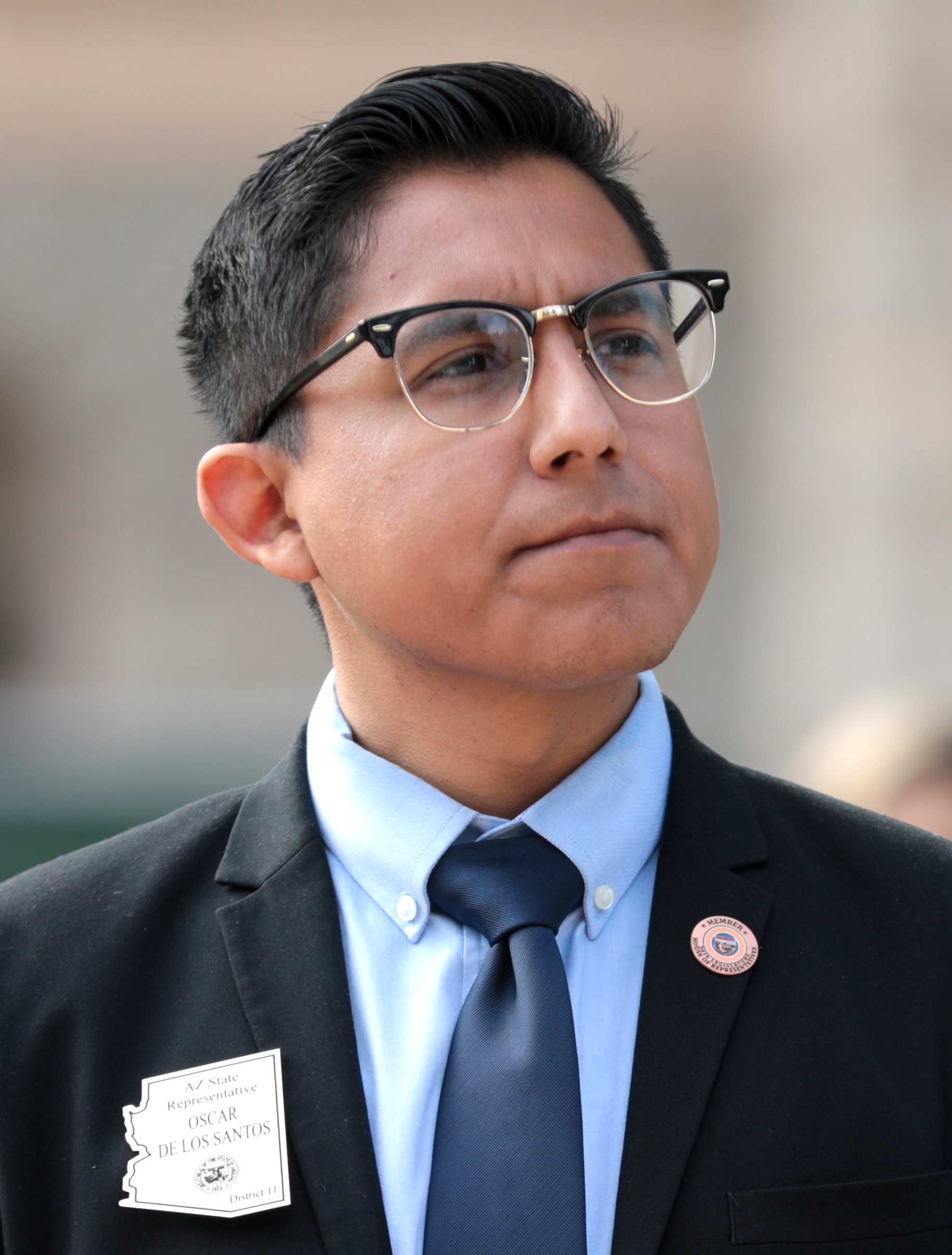

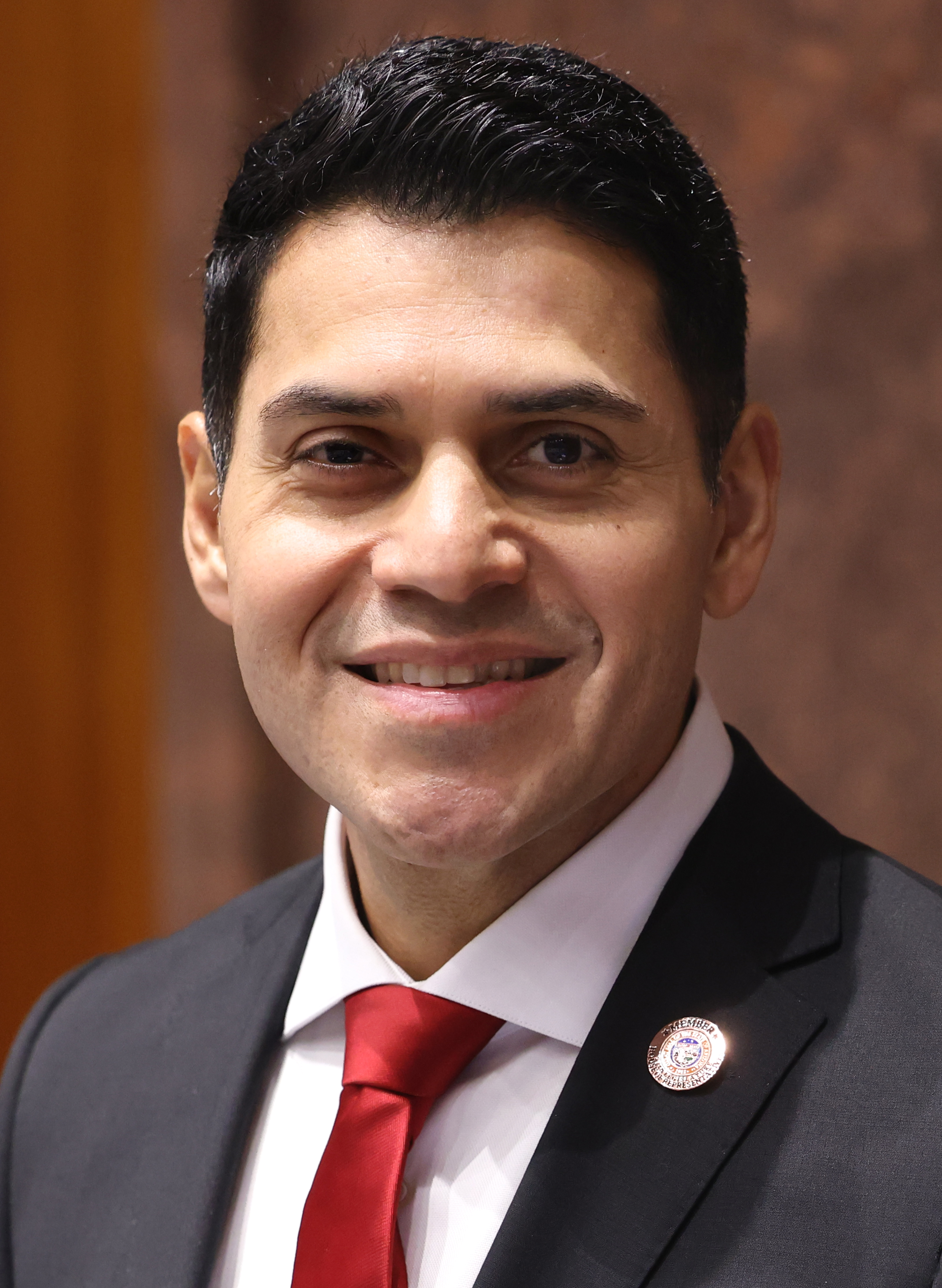
| | Majority party | Minority party |
|---|---|---|
| Leader | Oscar De Los Santos | Steve Montenegro |
| Party | Democratic | Republican |
| Leader since | January 13, 2025 | January 13, 2025 |
| Leader's seat | 11th–Phoenix | 29th–Surprise |
| Last election | 27 seats, 44.3% | 33 seats, 54.8% |
| Seats before | 27 | 33 |
| Seats won | 37 | 23 |
| Seat change | 10 ▲ | 10 ▼ |
- Results: Republican hold Republican gain Democratic hold Democratic gain Race uncalled
Speaker before election
Steve Montenegro
Republican
Elected Speaker
TBD

The 2026 Arizona House of Representatives elections were held on November 3, 2026. Voters elected all 60 members of the Arizona House of Representatives to serve two-year terms with two members chosen from each of the state's 30 legislative districts. Primary elections were held on July 21, 2026.

Prior to the elections, Republicans held a majority of 33 members over the 27 Democrats. To flip control of the chamber, Democrats needed to gain four seats. Each district is home to two seats.

Democrats were able to flip the chamber. Because Democrats also won the Arizona Senate and retained the Governor's office, the Democrats won their first trifecta in the state since 1966.

== Background ==
=== Partisan background ===
In the 2024 presidential election, Donald Trump won 17 districts, while Kamala Harris won 13.

Harris 40–50% 50–60% 60–70% 70–80% / Trump 50–60% 60–70% 70–80%

== Predictions ==
| Source | Ranking | As of |
|---|---|---|
| Sabato's Crystal Ball | Tossup | January 22, 2026 |
| State Navigate | Likely D (flip) | October 14, 2026 |

== Retiring incumbents ==
=== Republicans ===
1. District 3: Alexander Kolodin is retiring to run for secretary of state.
2. District 7: Sylvia Allen is retiring.
3. District 10: Ralph Heap is retiring to run for corporation commissioner.
4. District 13: Jeff Weninger is retiring to run for mayor of Chandler and Julie Willoughby is retiring to run for state senate.
5. District 14: Khyl Powell is retiring.
6. District 19: Gail Griffin is term-limited and is retiring to run for state senate.
7. District 30: Leo Biasiucci is term-limited and is retiring to run for state senate and John Gillette is retiring.

=== Democrats ===
1. District 6: Myron Tsosie is term-limited and is running for state senate.
2. District 9: Seth Blattman is retiring.
3. District 12: Patty Contreras is retiring to run for state senate.
4. District 20: Alma Hernandez is term-limited and is retiring to run for state senate.
5. District 22: Lupe Contreras is retiring to run for Agua Fria justice of the peace.
6. District 24: Anna Abeytia is retiring.

== Incumbents defeated ==
=== In primaries ===
==== Democrats ====
1. District 21: Stephanie Stahl Hamilton lost renomination to Miranda Lopez.
2. District 24: Lydia Hernandez lost renomination to Lisbeth Arescurenaga and Alberto Flores.

== Summary of results by district ==
† - Incumbent not seeking re-election

| District | 2024 pres. | Incumbent | Party | Elected representative | Party |
|---|---|---|---|---|---|
| 1st | R+33.2 | Selina Bliss | Rep | Selina Bliss | Rep |
| 1st | R+33.2 | Quang Nguyen | Rep | Quang Nguyen | Rep |
| 2nd | R+5.6 | Stephanie Simacek | Dem | Stephanie Simacek | Dem |
| 2nd | R+5.6 | Justin Wilmeth | Rep | Justin Wilmeth | Rep |
| 3rd | R+24.5 | Alexander Kolodin† | Rep | George Khalaf | Rep |
| 3rd | R+24.5 | Cody Reim | Rep | Cody Reim | Rep |
| 4th | R+3.5 | Matt Gress | Rep | Tammy Caputi | Dem |
| 4th | R+3.5 | Pamela Carter | Rep | Karen Gresham | Dem |
| 5th | D+36.4 | Sarah Liguori | Dem | Sarah Liguori | Dem |
| 5th | D+36.4 | Aaron Marquez | Dem | Aaron Marquez | Dem |
| 6th | D+27.2 | Mae Peshlakai | Dem | Mae Peshlakai | Dem |
| 6th | D+27.2 | Myron Tsosie† | Dem | Ian Teller | Dem |
| 7th | R+29.9 | Walt Blackman | Rep | Walt Blackman | Rep |
| 7th | R+29.9 | Sylvia Allen | Rep | David Cook | Rep |
| 8th | D+19.7 | Janeen Connolly | Dem | Janeen Connolly | Dem |
| 8th | D+19.7 | Brian Garcia | Dem | Brian Garcia | Dem |
| 9th | D+3.0 | Lorena Austin | Dem | Lorena Austin | Dem |
| 9th | D+3.0 | Seth Blattman† | Dem | Jacob Martinez | Dem |
| 10th | R+20.9 | Justin Olson | Rep | Justin Olson | Rep |
| 10th | R+20.9 | Ralph Heap† | Rep | James Rogers | Rep |
| 11th | D+39.8 | Oscar De Los Santos | Dem | Oscar De Los Santos | Dem |
| 11th | D+39.8 | Junelle Cavero | Dem | Junelle Cavero | Dem |
| 12th | D+15.9 | Patty Contreras† | Dem | Armando Montero | Dem |
| 12th | D+15.9 | Stacey Travers | Dem | Stacey Travers | Dem |
| 13th | R+1.2 | Jeff Weninger† | Rep | Racquel Armstrong | Dem |
| 13th | R+1.2 | Julie Willoughby† | Rep | Jacob Weinberg | Dem |
| 14th | R+18.3 | Khyl Powell† | Rep | Tyler Farnsworth | Rep |
| 14th | R+18.3 | Laurin Hendrix | Rep | Mary Rose | Dem |
| 15th | R+30.5 | Michael Way | Rep | Michael Way | Rep |
| 15th | R+30.5 | Neal Carter | Rep | Neal Carter | Rep |
| 16th | R+9.4 | Teresa Martinez | Rep | Teresa Martinez | Rep |
| 16th | R+9.4 | Chris Lopez | Rep | Julia Romero Gusse | Dem |
| 17th | R+3.9 | Rachel Jones | Rep | Holly Lyon | Dem |
| 17th | R+3.9 | Kevin Volk | Dem | Kevin Volk | Dem |
| 18th | D+24.0 | Nancy Gutierrez | Dem | Nancy Gutierrez | Dem |
| 18th | D+24.0 | Christopher Mathis | Dem | Christopher Mathis | Dem |
| 19th | R+23.0 | Gail Griffin† | Rep | David Gowan | Rep |
| 19th | R+23.0 | Lupe Diaz | Rep | Lupe Diaz | Rep |
| 20th | D+43.2 | Betty Villegas | Dem | Betty Villegas | Dem |
| 20th | D+43.2 | Alma Hernandez† | Dem | Sally Ann Gonzales | Dem |
| 21st | D+18.5 | Consuelo Hernandez | Dem | Consuelo Hernandez | Dem |
| 21st | D+18.5 | Stephanie Stahl Hamilton | Dem | Miranda Lopez | Dem |
| 22nd | D+21.1 | Lupe Contreras † | Dem | Betsy Munoz | Dem |
| 22nd | D+21.1 | Elda Luna-Nájera | Dem | Elda Luna-Nájera | Dem |
| 23rd | D+1.8 | Mariana Sandoval | Dem | Mariana Sandoval | Dem |
| 23rd | D+1.8 | Michele Pena | Rep | Emilia Cortez | Dem |
| 24th | D+20.5 | Anna Abeytia | Dem | Lisbeth Arescurenaga | Dem |
| 24th | D+20.5 | Lydia Hernandez | Dem | Alberto Flores | Dem |
| 25th | R+29.4 | Nick Kupper | Rep | Nick Kupper | Rep |
| 25th | R+29.4 | Michael Carbone | Rep | Michael Carbone | Rep |
| 26th | D+28.8 | Cesar Aguilar | Dem | Cesar Aguilar | Dem |
| 26th | D+28.8 | Quantá Crews | Dem | Quantá Crews | Dem |
| 27th | R+11.3 | Lisa Fink | Rep | | |
| 27th | R+11.3 | Tony Rivero | Rep | Deborah Howard | Dem |
| 28th | R+23.1 | Beverly Pingerelli | Rep | Beverly Pingerelli | Rep |
| 28th | R+23.1 | David Livingston | Rep | David Livingston | Rep |
| 29th | R+18.3 | Steve Montenegro | Rep | Steve Montenegro | Rep |
| 29th | R+18.3 | James Taylor | Rep | Christine Scianna | Dem |
| 30th | R+55.2 | John Gillette | Rep | Mike Gannuscio | Rep |
| 30th | R+55.2 | Leo Biasiucci† | Rep | David Rose | Rep |

== Detailed results ==
=== District 1 ===
Primary election results
| Party | Candidate | Votes | % |
Republican Party primary results
| Republican | Selina Bliss (incumbent) | 33,391 | 42.43% |
| Republican | Quang Nguyen (incumbent) | 33,231 | 42.23% |
| Republican | Shawn Dell Wildman | 12,074 | 15.34% |
| Total votes | | 78,696 | 100% |
Democratic Party primary results
| Democratic | Sandy Zalecki | 17,459 | 100.00% |
| Total votes | | 17,459 | 100% |

=== District 2 ===
Primary election results
| Party | Candidate | Votes | % |
Republican Party primary results
| Republican | Justin Wilmeth (incumbent) | 13,407 | 87.90% |
| Republican | Paul Carver (Write-in) | 1,845 | 12.10% |
| Total votes | | 15,252 | 100% |
Democratic Party primary results
| Democratic | Stephanie Simacek (incumbent) | 14,490 | 100.00% |
| Total votes | | 14,490 | 100% |

=== District 3 ===
Primary election results
| Party | Candidate | Votes | % |
Republican Party primary results
| Republican | George Khalaf | 23,165 | 33.68% |
| Republican | Cody Reim (incumbent) | 18,713 | 27.20% |
| Republican | Jay Schlum | 18,046 | 26.23% |
| Republican | Thomas M. Walsh II | 8,863 | 12.88% |
| Total votes | | 68,787 | 100% |
Democratic Party primary results
| Democratic | Julie Gable | 18,522 | 56.07% |
| Democratic | Rick Spargo | 14,509 | 43.93% |
| Total votes | | 33,031 | 100% |
No Labels Party primary results
| No Labels | John Skirbst (Write-in) | 7 | 100.00% |
| Total votes | | 7 | 100% |

=== District 4 ===
Primary election results
| Party | Candidate | Votes | % |
Republican Party primary results
| Republican | Matt Gress (incumbent) | 20,955 | 45.31% |
| Republican | Pamela Carter (incumbent) | 15,572 | 33.67% |
| Republican | Sandra Christensen | 9,717 | 21.01% |
| Total votes | | 46,244 | 100% |
Democratic Party primary results
| Democratic | Karen Gresham | 20,079 | 51.70% |
| Democratic | Tammy Caputi | 18,762 | 48.30% |
| Total votes | | 38,841 | 100% |

=== District 5 ===
Primary election results
| Party | Candidate | Votes | % |
Democratic Party primary results
| Democratic | Sarah Liguori (incumbent) | 19,718 | 53.12% |
| Democratic | Aaron Márquez (incumbent) | 17,403 | 46.88% |
| Total votes | | 37,121 | 100% |

=== District 6 ===
Primary election results
| Party | Candidate | Votes | % |
Democratic Party primary results
| Democratic | Mae Peshlakai (incumbent) | 17,323 | 42.41% |
| Democratic | Ian Teller | 12,067 | 29.55% |
| Democratic | Angela Maloney | 11,452 | 28.04% |
| Total votes | | 40,842 | 100% |
Green Party primary results
| Green | Brendan Trachsel (Write-in) | 8 | 100.00% |
| Total votes | | 8 | 100% |

=== District 7 ===
Primary election results
| Party | Candidate | Votes | % |
Republican Party primary results
| Republican | Walter Blackman (incumbent) | 19,404 | 35.03% |
| Republican | David Cook Sr. | 14,972 | 27.03% |
| Republican | Andrew Costanzo | 11,913 | 21.50% |
| Republican | Barby Ingle | 9,111 | 16.45% |
| Total votes | | 55,400 | 100% |
Democratic Party primary results
| Democratic | Samuel Martin | 14,308 | 100.00% |
| Total votes | | 14,308 | 100% |
Green Party primary results
| Green | Richard Grayson (Write-in) | 1 | 100.00% |
| Total votes | | 1 | 100% |

=== District 8 ===
Primary election results
| Party | Candidate | Votes | % |
Republican Party primary results
| Republican | Donald Hawker | 6,883 | 100.00% |
| Total votes | | 6,883 | 100% |
Democratic Party primary results
| Democratic | Brian Garcia (incumbent) | 12,315 | 42.53% |
| Democratic | Janeen Connolly (incumbent) | 9,015 | 31.13% |
| Democratic | Claudia Kline | 7,629 | 26.34% |
| Total votes | | 28,959 | 100% |

=== District 9 ===
Primary election results
| Party | Candidate | Votes | % |
Republican Party primary results
| Republican | Bradley Bettencourt | 10,441 | 97.65% |
| Republican | Sage Stroh (Write-in) | 251 | 2.35% |
| Total votes | | 10,692 | 100% |
Democratic Party primary results
| Democratic | Lorena Austin (incumbent) | 11,252 | 54.78% |
| Democratic | Jacob Martinez | 9,290 | 45.22% |
| Total votes | | 20,542 | 100% |

=== District 10 ===
Primary election results
| Party | Candidate | Votes | % |
Republican Party primary results
| Republican | Justin Olson (incumbent) | 19,183 | 44.03% |
| Republican | James Rogers | 15,086 | 34.62% |
| Republican | Ciara Anderson | 9,303 | 21.35% |
| Total votes | | 43,572 | 100% |
Democratic Party primary results
| Democratic | Helen Hunter | 12,862 | 55.15% |
| Democratic | Brian Calaway | 10,428 | 44.71% |
| Democratic | Robert Hernandez McDonald Jr. (Write-in) | 32 | 0.14% |
| Total votes | | 23,322 | 100% |
No Labels Party primary results
| No Labels | David Scott | 516 | 100.00% |
| Total votes | | 516 | 100% |

=== District 11 ===
Primary election results
| Party | Candidate | Votes | % |
Republican Party primary results
| Republican | Joseph Charles Dailey | 2,946 | 53.37% |
| Republican | Cesar Aleman | 2,574 | 46.63% |
| Total votes | | 5,520 | 100% |
Democratic Party primary results
| Democratic | Oscar De Los Santos (incumbent) | 11,424 | 52.24% |
| Democratic | Junelle Cavero (incumbent) | 10,446 | 47.76% |
| Total votes | | 21,870 | 100% |

=== District 12 ===
Primary election results
| Party | Candidate | Votes | % |
Republican Party primary results
| Republican | David Richardson | 13,668 | 100.00% |
| Total votes | | 13,668 | 100% |
Democratic Party primary results
| Democratic | Stacey Travers (incumbent) | 18,942 | 50.34% |
| Democratic | Armando Montero | 18,683 | 49.66% |
| Total votes | | 37,625 | 100% |

=== District 13 ===
Primary election results
| Party | Candidate | Votes | % |
Republican Party primary results
| Republican | Kevin Hartke | 15,729 | 43.31% |
| Republican | Janet Weninger | 12,594 | 34.68% |
| Republican | Debra Schinke | 7,992 | 22.01% |
| Total votes | | 36,315 | 100% |
Democratic Party primary results
| Democratic | Racquel Armstrong | 15,298 | 54.11% |
| Democratic | Jacob Weinberg | 12,972 | 45.89% |
| Total votes | | 28,270 | 100% |

=== District 14 ===
Primary election results
| Party | Candidate | Votes | % |
Republican Party primary results
| Republican | Tyler Farnsworth | 17,364 | 41.68% |
| Republican | Laurin Hendrix (incumbent) | 15,868 | 38.09% |
| Republican | Jed Lyons | 8,424 | 20.22% |
| Total votes | | 41,656 | 100% |
Democratic Party primary results
| Democratic | Mary Rose | 13,281 | 100.00% |
| Total votes | | 13,281 | 100% |

=== District 15 ===
Primary election results
| Party | Candidate | Votes | % |
Republican Party primary results
| Republican | Neal Carter (incumbent) | 22,107 | 51.03% |
| Republican | Michael Way (incumbent) | 21,212 | 48.97% |
| Total votes | | 43,319 | 100% |

=== District 16 ===
Primary election results
| Party | Candidate | Votes | % |
Republican Party primary results
| Republican | Chris Lopez (incumbent) | 13,973 | 51.41% |
| Republican | Teresa Martinez (incumbent) | 13,205 | 48.59% |
| Total votes | | 27,178 | 100% |
Democratic Party primary results
| Democratic | Julia Gusse | 14,511 | 100.00% |
| Total votes | | 14,511 | 100% |

=== District 17 ===
Primary election results
| Party | Candidate | Votes | % |
Republican Party primary results
| Republican | John Winchester | 21,720 | 50.06% |
| Republican | Rachel Keshel (incumbent) | 21,667 | 49.94% |
| Total votes | | 43,387 | 100% |
Democratic Party primary results
| Democratic | Hollace Lyon | 24,109 | 50.86% |
| Democratic | Kevin Volk (incumbent) | 23,293 | 49.14% |
| Total votes | | 47,402 | 100% |

=== District 18 ===
Primary election results
| Party | Candidate | Votes | % |
Republican Party primary results
| Republican | Bob Dohse | 15,044 | 100.00% |
| Total votes | | 15,044 | 100% |
Democratic Party primary results
| Democratic | Nancy Gutierrez (incumbent) | 27,096 | 53.49% |
| Democratic | Chris Mathis (incumbent) | 23,557 | 46.51% |
| Total votes | | 50,653 | 100% |

=== District 19 ===
Primary election results
| Party | Candidate | Votes | % |
Republican Party primary results
| Republican | David Gowan | 19,490 | 43.90% |
| Republican | Lupe Diaz (incumbent) | 14,307 | 32.22% |
| Republican | Cheryl Caswell | 10,601 | 23.88% |
| Total votes | | 44,398 | 100% |
Democratic Party primary results
| Democratic | Jackie Anderson | 13,456 | 50.05% |
| Democratic | Aiden Swallow | 13,430 | 49.95% |
| Total votes | | 26,886 | 100% |

=== District 20 ===
Primary election results
| Party | Candidate | Votes | % |
Republican Party primary results
| Republican | Katherine Weasel (Write-in) | 204 | 100.00% |
| Total votes | | 204 | 100% |
Democratic Party primary results
| Democratic | Sally Ann Gonzales | 12,532 | 32.87% |
| Democratic | Betty Villegas (incumbent) | 12,240 | 32.11% |
| Democratic | Genoveva Diaz | 7,290 | 19.12% |
| Democratic | Ben Koehler | 6,059 | 15.89% |
| Total votes | | 38,121 | 100% |

=== District 21 ===
Primary election results
| Party | Candidate | Votes | % |
Republican Party primary results
| Republican | Christopher Kibbey | 7,830 | 100.00% |
| Total votes | | 7,830 | 100% |
Democratic Party primary results
| Democratic | Consuelo Hernandez (incumbent) | 10,205 | 29.79% |
| Democratic | Miranda Lopez | 8,677 | 25.33% |
| Democratic | Stephanie Stahl Hamilton (incumbent) | 8,395 | 24.51% |
| Democratic | Maritza Higuera | 6,976 | 20.37% |
| Total votes | | 34,253 | 100% |

=== District 22 ===
Primary election results
| Party | Candidate | Votes | % |
Republican Party primary results
| Republican | Blaine Griffin Sr. (Write-in) | 118 | 50.43% |
| Republican | Diana Jones (Write-in) | 116 | 49.57% |
| Total votes | | 234 | 100% |
Democratic Party primary results
| Democratic | Elda Luna-Nájera (incumbent) | 5,682 | 29.27% |
| Democratic | Betsy Munoz | 5,392 | 27.77% |
| Democratic | Veronica Bejarano-Malone | 4,846 | 24.96% |
| Democratic | Steven Chapman | 1,898 | 9.78% |
| Democratic | Gwen Johnston | 1,597 | 8.23% |
| Total votes | | 19,415 | 100% |

=== District 23 ===
Primary election results
| Party | Candidate | Votes | % |
Republican Party primary results
| Republican | Michele Peña (incumbent) | 6,908 | 53.20% |
| Republican | Gary Snyder | 6,077 | 46.80% |
| Total votes | | 12,985 | 100% |
Democratic Party primary results
| Democratic | Mariana Sandoval (incumbent) | 8,546 | 38.26% |
| Democratic | Emilia Cortez | 5,719 | 25.60% |
| Democratic | Juan Manuel Guerrero | 4,096 | 18.34% |
| Democratic | Naomi Miguel | 3,976 | 17.80% |
| Total votes | | 22,337 | 100% |

=== District 24 ===
Primary election results
| Party | Candidate | Votes | % |
Republican Party primary results
| Republican | Delores McLaughlin | 3,987 | 100.00% |
| Total votes | | 3,987 | 100% |
Democratic Party primary results
| Democratic | Alberto Flores | 7,468 | 39.95% |
| Democratic | Lisbeth Arescurenaga | 6,930 | 37.07% |
| Democratic | Lydia Hernandez (incumbent) | 2,666 | 14.26% |
| Democratic | Rosa Cantu | 1,628 | 8.71% |
| Total votes | | 18,692 | 100% |

=== District 25 ===
Primary election results
| Party | Candidate | Votes | % |
Republican Party primary results
| Republican | Michael Carbone (incumbent) | 18,931 | 53.04% |
| Republican | Nick Kupper (incumbent) | 16,758 | 46.96% |
| Total votes | | 35,689 | 100% |
Democratic Party primary results
| Democratic | Tiffany Byrne | 11,357 | 100.00% |
| Total votes | | 11,357 | 100% |

=== District 26 ===
Primary election results
| Party | Candidate | Votes | % |
Republican Party primary results
| Republican | Frank Roberts | 2,639 | 51.88% |
| Republican | Jonathan McKenna | 2,448 | 48.12% |
| Total votes | | 5,087 | 100% |
Democratic Party primary results
| Democratic | Cesar Aguilar (incumbent) | 7,242 | 54.52% |
| Democratic | Quantá Crews (incumbent) | 6,040 | 45.48% |
| Total votes | | 13,282 | 100% |
Green Party primary results
| Green | Hector Gomez | 10 | 100.00% |
| Total votes | | 10 | 100% |

=== District 27 ===
Primary election results
| Party | Candidate | Votes | % |
Republican Party primary results
| Republican | Lisa Fink (incumbent) | 13,796 | 52.58% |
| Republican | Tony Rivero (incumbent) | 12,442 | 47.42% |
| Total votes | | 26,238 | 100% |
Democratic Party primary results
| Democratic | Deborah Howard | 12,510 | 100.00% |
| Total votes | | 12,510 | 100% |

=== District 28 ===
Primary election results
| Party | Candidate | Votes | % |
Republican Party primary results
| Republican | Beverly Pingerelli (incumbent) | 25,694 | 41.78% |
| Republican | David Livingston (incumbent) | 23,982 | 39.00% |
| Republican | Heather Rooks | 11,819 | 19.22% |
| Total votes | | 61,495 | 100% |
Democratic Party primary results
| Democratic | Barbara Fike | 15,901 | 54.36% |
| Democratic | Marc Graham | 13,352 | 45.64% |
| Total votes | | 29,253 | 100% |

=== District 29 ===
Primary election results
| Party | Candidate | Votes | % |
Republican Party primary results
| Republican | Steve Montenegro (incumbent) | 18,695 | 52.75% |
| Republican | James Taylor (incumbent) | 16,747 | 47.25% |
| Total votes | | 35,442 | 100% |
Democratic Party primary results
| Democratic | Christine Scianna | 14,068 | 100.00% |
| Total votes | | 14,068 | 100% |

=== District 30 ===
Primary election results
| Party | Candidate | Votes | % |
Republican Party primary results
| Republican | Mike Gannuscio | 21,146 | 34.29% |
| Republican | David Rose | 17,903 | 29.03% |
| Republican | Grace Hecht | 12,267 | 19.89% |
| Republican | Catherine Lopez-Rajaniemi | 6,565 | 10.65% |
| Republican | Caroline Strecker | 3,787 | 6.14% |
| Total votes | | 61,668 | 100% |
Democratic Party primary results
| Democratic | Brian McMahan | 7,975 | 100.00% |
| Total votes | | 7,975 | 100% |
