= List of representatives and senators of the Arizona Legislature by district, 2023–2033 =

List of representatives and senators of the Arizona Legislature by legislative districts after the 2020 redistricting.

== Background ==
Redistricting in Arizona occurs every 10 years and is conducted by the Arizona Independent Redistricting Commission. The first election using the newly drawn districts occurred on November 8, 2022.

A district map can be found here.

== Arizona – by legislature ==
	Senate		
Affiliation			Total
Affiliation	Republican Party	Democratic Party	Total
Members 23–24	16	14	30
Members 25–26	17	13	30

	House		
Affiliation			Total
Affiliation	Republican Party	Democratic Party	Total
Members 23–24	31	29	60
Members 25–26	33	27	60

== Arizona – by district ==
† Member was appointed.

=== Arizona – 1st district – Prescott – Yavapai County – Black Canyon City ===
Legisl.	Senator	P	Info	Representative 1	P	Info	Representative 2	P	Info
2023–2024	Ken Bennett	(R)	[ 1]	Quang Nguyen	(R)	[ 1]	Selina Bliss	(R)	[ 1]
2025–2026	Mark Finchem	(R)	1	Quang Nguyen	(R)	[ 1]	Selina Bliss	(R)	[ 1]
2027–2028	Mark Finchem	(R)	[ 1]	Quang Nguyen	(R)	[ 1]	Selina Bliss	(R)	[ 1]

=== Arizona – 2nd district – North Phoenix – Desert View ===
Legisl.	Senator	P	Info	Representative 1	P	Info	Representative 2	P	Info
2023–2024	Steve Kaiser	(R)	[ 1]	Judy Schwiebert	(D)	[ 1]	Justin Wilmeth	(R)	[ 1]
2025–2026	Shawnna Bolick	(R)	[ 1]	Stephanie Simacek	(D)	[ 1]	Justin Wilmeth	(R)	[ 1]
2027–2028	Amelia Gallitano	(D)	[ 1]	Stephanie Simacek	(D)	[ 1]	TBD	(TBD)	[ 1]

=== Arizona – 3rd district – Cave Creek – Fountain Hills – New River ===
Legisl.	Senator	P	Info	Representative 1	P	Info	Representative 2	P	Info
2023–2024	John Kavanagh	(R)	[ 1]	Joseph Chaplik	(R)	[ 1]	Alexander Kolodin	(R)	[ 1]
2025–2026	John Kavanagh	(R)	[ 1]	Joseph Chaplik (2025) †Cody Reim (2026)	(R)	[ 1]	Alexander Kolodin	(R)	[ 1]
2027–2028	John Kavanagh	(R)	[ 1]	Cody Reim	(R)	[ 1]	George Khalaf	(R)	[ 1]

=== Arizona – 4th district – Paradise Valley – North Scottsdale ===
Legisl.	Senator	P	Info	Representative 1	P	Info	Representative 2	P	Info
2023–2024	Christine Marsh	(D)	[ 1]	Laura Terech	(D)	[ 1]	Matt Gress	(R)	[ 1]
2025–2026	Carine Werner	(R)	[ 1]	Pamela Carter	(R)	[ 1]	Matt Gress	(R)	[ 1]
2027–2028	TBD	(D)	[ 1]	TBD	(R)	[ 1]	TBD	(R)	[ 1]

=== Arizona – 5th district – Phoenix East – Camelback East ===
Legisl.	Senator	P	Info	Representative 1	P	Info	Representative 2	P	Info
2023–2024	Lela Alston	(D)	[ 1]	Jennifer Longdon	(D)	[ 1]	Amish Shah	(D)	[ 1]
2025–2026	Lela Alston	(D)	[ 1]	Sarah Liguori	(D)	[ 1]	Aaron Márquez	(D)	[ 1]
2027–2028	Christine Marsh	(D)	[ 1]	Sarah Liguori	(D)	[ 1]	Aaron Márquez	(D)	[ 1]

=== Arizona – 6th district – North Flagstaff – Navajo County – Apache County ===
Legisl.	Senator	P	Info	Representative 1	P	Info	Representative 2	P	Info
2023–2024	Theresa Hatathlie	(D)	[ 1]	Myron Tsosie	(D)	[ 1]	Mae Peshlakai	(D)	[ 1]
2025–2026	Theresa Hatathlie	(D)	[ 1]	Myron Tsosie	(D)	[ 1]	Mae Peshlakai	(D)	[ 1]
2027–2028	Jamescita Peshlakai	(D)	[ 1]	Ian Teller	(D)	[ 1]	Mae Peshlakai	(D)	[ 1]

=== Arizona – 7th district – South Flagstaff – Gila County – Show Low ===
Legisl.	Senator	P	Info	Representative 1	P	Info	Representative 2	P	Info
2023–2024	Wendy Rogers	(R)	[ 1]	David Cook	(R)	[ 1]	David Marshall	(R)	[ 1]
2025–2026	Wendy Rogers	(R)	[ 1]	Walter Blackman	(R)	[ 1]	Sylvia Allen	(R)	[ 1]
2027–2028	Wendy Rogers	(R)	[ 1]	Walter Blackman	(R)	[ 1]	David Cook	(R)	[ 1]

=== Arizona – 8th district – Tempe – South Scottsdale – Salt River Reservation ===
Legisl.	Senator	P	Info	Representative 1	P	Info	Representative 2	P	Info
2023–2024	Juan Mendez	(D)	8	Athena Salman (2023) †Jevin Hodge (2024)	(D)	8; 8	Melody Hernandez	(D)	8
2025–2026	Lauren Kuby	(D)	[ 1]	Janeen Connolly	(D)	[ 1]	Brian Garcia	(D)	[ 1]
2027–2028	Lauren Kuby	(D)	[ 1]	Janeen Connolly	(D)	[ 1]	Brian Garcia	(D)	[ 1]

=== Arizona – 9th district – Mesa ===
Legisl.	Senator	P	Info	Representative 1	P	Info	Representative 2	P	Info
2023–2024	Eva Burch	(D)	[ 1]	Lorena Austin	(D)	[ 1]	Seth Blattman	(D)	[ 1]
2025–2026	Eva Burch	(D)	[ 1]	Lorena Austin	(D)	[ 1]	Seth Blattman	(D)	[ 1]
2027–2028	Kiana Maria Sears	(D)	[ 1]	Lorena Austin	(D)	[ 1]	Jacob D. Martinez	(D)	[ 1]

=== Arizona – 10th district – East Mesa ===
Legisl.	Senator	P	Info	Representative 1	P	Info	Representative 2	P	Info
2023–2024	David Farnsworth	(R)	[ 1]	Justin Heap	(R)	[ 1]	Barbara Parker	(R)	[ 1]
2025–2026	David Farnsworth	(R)	[ 1]	Ralph Heap	(R)	[ 1]	Justin Olson	(R)	[ 1]
2027–2028	David Farnsworth	(R)	[ 1]	James Rogers	(R)	[ 1]	Justin Olson	(R)	[ 1]

=== Arizona – 11th district – South Phoenix – Laveen ===
Legisl.	Senator	P	Info	Representative 1	P	Info	Representative 2	P	Info
2023–2024	Catherine Miranda	(D)	[ 1]	Marcelino Quiñonez	(D)	[ 1]	Oscar De Los Santos	(D)	[ 1]
2025–2026	Catherine Miranda	(D)	[ 1]	Junelle Cavero	(D)	[ 1]	Oscar De Los Santos	(D)	[ 1]
2027–2028	Catherine Miranda	(D)	[ 1]	Junelle Cavero	(D)	[ 1]	Oscar De Los Santos	(D)	[ 1]

=== Arizona – 12th district – South Tempe – Ahwatukee Foothills – West Chandler ===
Legisl.	Senator	P	Info	Representative 1	P	Info	Representative 2	P	Info
2023–2024	Mitzi Epstein	(D)	[ 1]	Patty Contreras	(D)	[ 1]	Stacey Travers	(D)	[ 1]
2025–2026	Mitzi Epstein	(D)	[ 1]	Patty Contreras	(D)	[ 1]	Stacey Travers	(D)	[ 1]
2027–2028	Patricia Contreras	(D)	[ 1]	Armando Montero	(D)	[ 1]	Stacey Travers	(D)	[ 1]

=== Arizona – 13th district – Chandler, Gilbert, Sun Lakes ===
Legisl.	Senator	P	Info	Representative 1	P	Info	Representative 2	P	Info
2023–2024	J. D. Mesnard	(R)	[ 1]	Jennifer Pawlik	(D)	[ 1]	Liz Harris	(R)	[ 1]
2025–2026	J. D. Mesnard	(R)	[ 1]	Jeff Weninger	(R)	[ 1]	Julie Willoughby	(R)	[ 1]
2027–2028	Kristie O'Brien	(D)	[ 1]	Racquel Armstrong	(D)	[ 1]	Jacob Weinberg	(D)	[ 1]

=== Arizona – 14th district – Gilbert ===
Legisl.	Senator	P	Info	Representative 1	P	Info	Representative 2	P	Info
2023–2024	Warren Petersen	(R)	[ 1]	Travis Grantham	(R)	[ 1]	Laurin Hendrix	(R)	[ 1]
2025–2026	Warren Petersen	(R)	[ 1]	Khyl Powell	(R)	[ 1]	Laurin Hendrix	(R)	[ 1]

=== Arizona – 15th district – Queen Creek – San Tan Valley ===
Legisl.	Senator	P	Info	Representative 1	P	Info	Representative 2	P	Info
2023–2024	Jake Hoffman	(R)	[ 1]	Neal Carter	(R)	[ 1]	Jacqueline Parker	(R)	[ 1]
2025–2026	Jake Hoffman	(R)	[ 1]	Neal Carter	(R)	[ 1]	Michael Way	(R)	[ 1]
2027–2028	Jake Hoffman	(R)	[ 1]	Neal Carter	(R)	[ 1]	Michael Way	(R)	[ 1]

=== Arizona – 16th district – Pinal County – Casa Grande – Florence ===
Legisl.	Senator	P	Info	Representative 1	P	Info	Representative 2	P	Info
2023–2024	T. J. Shope	(R)	[ 1]	Keith Seaman	(D)	[ 1]	Teresa Martinez	(R)	[ 1]
2025–2026	T. J. Shope	(R)	[ 1]	Chris Lopez	(R)	[ 1]	Teresa Martinez	(R)	[ 1]

=== Arizona – 17th district – Oro Valley – Marana – Mount Lemmon ===
Legisl.	Senator	P	Info	Representative 1	P	Info	Representative 2	P	Info
2023–2024	Justine Wadsack	(R)	[ 1]	Rachel Jones	(R)	[ 1]	Cory McGarr	(R)	[ 1]
2025–2026	Vince Leach	(R)	[ 1]	Rachel Jones	(R)	[ 1]	Kevin Volk	(D)	[ 1]

=== Arizona – 18th district – Catalina Foothills ===
Legisl.	Senator	P	Info	Representative 1	P	Info	Representative 2	P	Info
2023–2024	Priya Sundareshan	(D)	[ 1]	Christopher Mathis	(D)	[ 1]	Nancy Gutierrez	(D)	[ 1]
2025–2026	Priya Sundareshan	(D)	[ 1]	Christopher Mathis	(D)	[ 1]	Nancy Gutierrez	(D)	[ 1]
2027–2028	Priya Sundareshan	(D)	[ 1]	Christopher Mathis	(D)	[ 1]	Nancy Gutierrez	(D)	[ 1]

=== Arizona – 19th district – Cochise County – Greenlee County – Safford ===
Legisl.	Senator	P	Info	Representative 1	P	Info	Representative 2	P	Info
2023–2024	David Gowan	(R)	[ 1]	Gail Griffin	(R)	[ 1]	Lupe Diaz	(R)	[ 1]
2025–2026	David Gowan	(R)	[ 1]	Gail Griffin	(R)	[ 1]	Lupe Diaz	(R)	[ 1]
2027–2028	David Gowan	(R)	[ 1]	Gail Griffin	(R)	[ 1]	Lupe Diaz	(R)	[ 1]

=== Arizona – 20th district – Tucson ===
Legisl.	Senator	P	Info	Representative 1	P	Info	Representative 2	P	Info
2023–2024	Sally Ann Gonzales	(D)	[ 1]	Betty Villegas	(D)	[ 1]	Alma Hernandez	(D)	[ 1]
2025–2026	Sally Ann Gonzales	(D)	[ 1]	Betty Villegas	(D)	[ 1]	Alma Hernandez	(D)	[ 1]
2025–2026	Alma Hernandez	(D)	[ 1]	Betty Villegas	(D)	[ 1]	Sally Ann Gonzales	(D)	[ 1]

=== Arizona – 21st district – East Tucson – Nogales ===
Legisl.	Senator	P	Info	Representative 1	P	Info	Representative 2	P	Info
2023–2024	Rosanna Gabaldon	(D)	[ 1]	Consuelo Hernandez	(D)	[ 1]	Stephanie Stahl Hamilton	(D)	[ 1]
2025–2026	Rosanna Gabaldon	(D)	[ 1]	Consuelo Hernandez	(D)	[ 1]	Stephanie Stahl Hamilton	(D)	[ 1]
2027–2028	Rosanna Gabaldon	(D)	[ 1]	Consuelo Hernandez	(D)	[ 1]	Miranda Lopez	(D)	[ 1]

=== Arizona – 22nd district – Tolleson – Goodyear – Maryvale ===
Legisl.	Senator	P	Info	Representative 1	P	Info	Representative 2	P	Info
2023–2024	Eva Diaz	(D)	[ 1]	Lupe Contreras	(D)	[ 1]	Leezah Sun	(D)	[ 1]
2025–2026	Eva Diaz	(D)	[ 1]	Lupe Contreras	(D)	[ 1]	Elda Luna-Nájera	(D)	[ 1]
2027–2028	Eva Diaz	(D)	[ 1]	Betsy Munoz	(D)	[ 1]	Elda Luna-Nájera	(D)	[ 1]

=== Arizona – 23rd district – Maricopa County South-West – Yuma ===
Legisl.	Senator	P	Info	Representative 1	P	Info	Representative 2	P	Info
2023–2024	Brian Fernandez	(D)	[ 23]	Mariana Sandoval	(D)	[ 23]	Michele Pena	(R)	[ 23]
2025–2026	Brian Fernandez	(D)	[ 23]	Mariana Sandoval	(D)	[ 23]	Michele Pena	(R)	[ 23]
2027–2028	Brian Fernandez	(D)	[ 23]	Mariana Sandoval	(D)	[ 23]	Emilia Cortez	(D)	[ 23]

=== Arizona – 24th district – Glendale – Maryvale ===
Legisl.	Senator	P	Info	Representative 1	P	Info	Representative 2	P	Info
2023–2024	Anna Hernandez	(D)	[ 1]	Lydia Hernandez	(D)	[ 1]	Analise Ortiz	(D)	[ 1]
2025–2026	Analise Ortiz	(D)	[ 1]	Lydia Hernandez	(D)	[ 1]	Anna Abeytia	(D)	[ 1]
2025–2026	Analise Ortiz	(D)	[ 1]	Lydia Hernandez	(D)	[ 1]	Alberto Flores	(D)	[ 1]

=== Arizona – 25th district – Buckeye – Yuma County ===
Legisl.	Senator	P	Info	Representative 1	P	Info	Representative 2	P	Info
2023–2024	Sine Kerr	(R)	[ 1]	Michael Carbone	(R)	[ 1]	Tim Dunn	(R)	[ 1]
2025–2026	Tim Dunn	(R)	[ 1]	Michael Carbone	(R)	[ 1]	Nick Kupper	(R)	[ 1]
2027–2028	Tim Dunn	(R)	[ 1]	TBD	(R)	[ 1]	TBD	(D)	[ 1]

=== Arizona – 26th district – Phoenix West – Alhambra ===
Legisl.	Senator	P	Info	Representative 1	P	Info	Representative 2	P	Info
2023–2024	Raquel Terán	(D)	[ 1]	Flavio Bravo	(D)	[ 1]	Cesar Aguilar	(D)	[ 1]
2025–2026	Flavio Bravo	(D)	[ 1]	Quantá Crews	(D)	[ 1]	Cesar Aguilar	(D)	[ 1]
2027–2028	Flavio Bravo	(D)	[ 1]	Quantá Crews	(D)	[ 1]	Cesar Aguilar	(D)	[ 1]

=== Arizona – 27th district – Peoria – North Glendale ===
Legisl.	Senator	P	Info	Representative 1	P	Info	Representative 2	P	Info
2023–2024	Anthony Kern	(R)	[ 1]	Kevin Payne	(R)	[ 1]	Ben Toma	(R)	[ 1]
2025–2026	Kevin Payne	(D)	[ 1]	Lisa Fink	(R)	[ 1]	Tony Rivero	(R)	[ 1]
2027–2028	Kyle Clayton	(R)	[ 1]	TBD	(R)	[ 1]	TBD	(D)	[ 1]

=== Arizona – 28th district – Sun City – Sun City West – Rio Vista ===
Legisl.	Senator	P	Info	Representative 1	P	Info	Representative 2	P	Info
2023–2024	Frank Carroll	(R)	[ 1]	David Livingston	(R)	[ 1]	Beverly Pingerelli	(R)	[ 1]
2025–2026	Frank Carroll	(R)	[ 1]	David Livingston	(R)	[ 1]	Beverly Pingerelli	(R)	[ 1]
2027–2028	Frank Carroll	(R)	[ 1]	David Livingston	(R)	[ 1]	Beverly Pingerelli	(R)	[ 1]

=== Arizona – 29th district – Surprise – Litchfield Park ===
Legisl.	Senator	P	Info	Representative 1	P	Info	Representative 2	P	Info
2023–2024	Janae Shamp	(R)	[ 1]	Steve Montenegro	(R)	[ 1]	Austin Smith	(R)	[ 1]
2025–2026	Janae Shamp	(R)	[ 1]	Steve Montenegro	(R)	[ 1]	James Taylor	(R)	[ 1]
2027–2028	Janae Shamp	(R)	[ 1]	Steve Montenegro	(R)	[ 1]	Christine Marie Scianna?	(D?)	[ 1]

=== Arizona – 30th district – La Paz County – Mohave County ===
Legisl.	Senator	P	Info	Representative 1	P	Info	Representative 2	P	Info
2023–2024	Sonny Borrelli	(R)	[ 1]	John Gillette	(R)	[ 1]	Leo Biasiucci	(R)	[ 1]
2025–2026	Hildy Angius	(R)	[ 1]	John Gillette	(R)	[ 1]	Leo Biasiucci	(R)	[ 1]
2027–2028	Leo Biasiucci	(R)	[ 1]	Mike Gannuscio	(R)	[ 1]	David Rose	(R)	[ 1]

== See also ==
- List of representatives and senators of the Arizona Legislature by district, 2013–2023
- List of representatives and senators of the Arizona Legislature by district, 2003–2013
- List of Arizona legislative districts
