= 57th Arizona State Legislature =

Session of the Arizona Legislature

| ← | 56th | 58th | → |
- Arizona State Capitol (2014)

Overview
- Legislative body: Arizona State Legislature
- Jurisdiction: Arizona, United States
- Term: January 1, 2025 – December 31, 2026

Senate
- Members: 30
- President: Warren Petersen
- Temporary President: T. J. Shope
- Party control: Republican (17–13)

House of Representatives
- Members: 60
- Speaker: Steve Montenegro
- Party control: Republican (33–27)

Sessions
- 1st: January 13, 2025 – June 27, 2025
- 2nd: January 12, 2026 –

The 57th Arizona State Legislature, consists of the Arizona Senate and the Arizona House of Representatives and was convened in 2025.

== Senate ==
| District | Image | Senator | Party | Residence | Assumed office on | Elected |
|---|---|---|---|---|---|---|
| 1 | | Mark Finchem | Rep | Prescott | 2025 | 2024 |
| 2 | | Shawnna Bolick | Rep | Phoenix | 2023 | 2023† |
| 3 | | John Kavanagh | Rep | Scottsdale | 2023 | 2022 |
| 4 | | Carine Werner | Rep | Scottsdale | 2025 | 2024 |
| 5 | | Lela Alston | Dem | Phoenix | 2023 | 2018 |
| 6 | | Theresa Hatathlie | Dem | Coal Mine Mesa | 2023 | 2022 |
| 7 | | Wendy Rogers | Rep | Tempe | 2023 | 2020 |
| 8 | | Lauren Kuby | Dem | Tempe | 2025 | 2024 |
| 9 | | Eva Burch | Dem | Mesa | 2023 | 2022 |
| 10 | | Dave Farnsworth | Rep | Mesa | 2023 | 2022 |
| 11 | | Catherine Miranda | Dem | Phoenix | 2023 | 2022 |
| 12 | | Mitzi Epstein | Dem | Chandler | 2023 | 2022 |
| 13 | | J. D. Mesnard | Rep | Chandler | 2023 | 2018 |
| 14 | | Warren Petersen | Rep | Gilbert | 2023 | 2020 |
| 15 | | Jake Hoffman | Rep | Queen Creek | 2023 | 2022 |
| 16 | | T. J. Shope | Rep | Coolidge | 2023 | 2020 |
| 17 | | Vince Leach | Rep | Tucson | 2025 | 2024 |
| 18 | | Priya Sundareshan | Dem | Tucson | 2023 | 2022 |
| 19 | | David Gowan | Rep | Sierra Vista | 2023 | 2018 |
| 20 | | Sally Ann Gonzales | Dem | Tucson | 2023 | 2018 |
| 21 | | Rosanna Gabaldón | Dem | Sahuarita | 2023 | 2022 |
| 22 | | Eva Diaz | Dem | Tolleson | 2023 | 2022 |
| 23 | | Brian Fernandez | Dem | Yuma | 2023 | 2022 |
| 24 | | Analise Ortiz | Dem | Phoenix | 2025 | 2024 |
| 25 | | Tim Dunn | Rep | Yuma | 2025 | 2024 |
| 26 | | Flavio Bravo | Dem | Phoenix | 2023 | 2023† |
| 27 | | Kevin Payne | Rep | Sun City | 2025 | 2024 |
| 28 | | Frank Carroll | Rep | Surprise | 2023 | 2022 |
| 29 | | Janae Shamp | Rep | Surprise | 2023 | 2022 |
| 30 | | Hildy Angius | Rep | Bullhead City | 2025 | 2024 |

† Member was originally appointed.

== House of Representatives ==
| District | Image | Name | Party | Residence | First elected |
|---|---|---|---|---|---|
| 1 | | Quang Nguyen | Rep | Prescott | 2020 |
| 1 | | Selina Bliss | Rep | Prescott | 2022 |
| 2 | | Justin Wilmeth | Rep | Phoenix | 2020 |
| 2 | | Stephanie Simacek | Dem | Deer Valley | 2024 |
| 3 | | Joseph Chaplik | Rep | Scottsdale | 2020 |
| 3 | | Alexander Kolodin | Rep | Scottsdale | 2022 |
| 4 | | Matt Gress | Rep | Phoenix | 2022 |
| 4 | | Pamela Carter | Rep | Scottsdale | 2024 |
| 5 | | Sarah Liguori | Dem | Phoenix | 2024† |
| 5 | | Aaron Márquez | Dem | Phoenix | 2024 |
| 6 | | Myron Tsosie | Dem | Chinle | 2018 |
| 6 | | Mae Peshlakai | Dem | Cameron | 2022 |
| 7 | | David Marshall | Rep | Snowflake | 2022 |
| 7 | | Walter Blackman | Rep | Snowflake | 2024 |
| 8 | | Janeen Connolly | Dem | Tempe | 2024 |
| 8 | | Brian Garcia | Dem | Tempe | 2024 |
| 9 | | Lorena Austin | Dem | Mesa | 2022 |
| 9 | | Seth Blattman | Dem | Mesa | 2022 |
| 10 | | Justin Olson | Rep | Mesa | 2024 |
| 10 | | Ralph Heap | Rep | Mesa | 2024 |
| 11 | | Oscar De Los Santos | Dem | Phoenix | 2022 |
| 11 | | Junelle Cavero | Dem | Phoenix | 2024† |
| 12 | | Patty Contreras | Dem | Ahwatukee | 2022 |
| 12 | | Stacey Travers | Dem | Phoenix | 2022 |
| 13 | | Julie Willoughby | Rep | Chandler | 2023† |
| 13 | | Jeff Weninger | Rep | Chandler | 2024 |
| 14 | | Laurin Hendrix | Rep | Gilbert | 2022 |
| 14 | | Khyl Powell | Rep | Gilbert | 2024 |
| 15 | | Neal Carter | Rep | San Tan Valley | 2021† |
| 15 | | Michael Way | Rep | Queen Creek | 2024 |
| 16 | | Teresa Martinez | Rep | Casa Grande | 2021† |
| 16 | | Chris Lopez | Rep | Casa Grande | 2024 |
| 17 | | Rachel Keshel | Rep | Tucson | 2022 |
| 17 | | Kevin Volk | Dem | Tucson | 2024 |
| 18 | | Christopher Mathis | Dem | Tucson | 2021† |
| 18 | | Nancy Gutierrez | Dem | Tucson | 2022 |
| 19 | | Gail Griffin | Rep | Hereford | 2018 |
| 19 | | Lupe Diaz | Rep | Benson | 2021† |
| 20 | | Alma Hernandez | Dem | Tucson | 2018 |
| 20 | | Betty Villegas | Dem | Tucson | 2023† |
| 21 | | Consuelo Hernandez | Dem | Sunnyside | 2022 |
| 21 | | Stephanie Stahl Hamilton | Dem | Tucson | 2022 |
| 22 | | Lupe Contreras | Dem | Cashion | 2022 |
| 22 | | Elda Luna-Nájera | Dem | Tolleson | 2024† |
| 23 | | Mariana Sandoval | Dem | Goodyear | 2022 |
| 23 | | Michele Peña | Rep | Yuma | 2022 |
| 24 | | Lydia Hernandez | Dem | Phoenix | 2022 |
| 24 | | Anna Abeytia | Dem | Maryvale | 2024 |
| 25 | | Michael Carbone | Rep | Buckeye | 2022 |
| 25 | | Nick Kupper | Rep | Phoenix | 2024 |
| 26 | | Cesar Aguilar | Dem | Phoenix | 2022 |
| 26 | | Quantá Crews | Dem | Phoenix | 2023† |
| 27 | | Lisa Fink | Rep | Glendale | 2024 |
| 27 | | Tony Rivero | Rep | Peoria | 2024 |
| 28 | | David Livingston | Rep | Peoria | 2022 |
| 28 | | Beverly Pingerelli | Rep | Glendale | 2020 |
| 29 | | Steve Montenegro | Rep | Surprise | 2022 |
| 29 | | James Taylor | Rep | Litchfield Park | 2024 |
| 30 | | Leo Biasiucci | Rep | Lake Havasu City | 2018 |
| 30 | | John Gillette | Rep | Kingman | 2022 |

†Member was originally appointed to the office.
