= List of Arizona legislative districts =

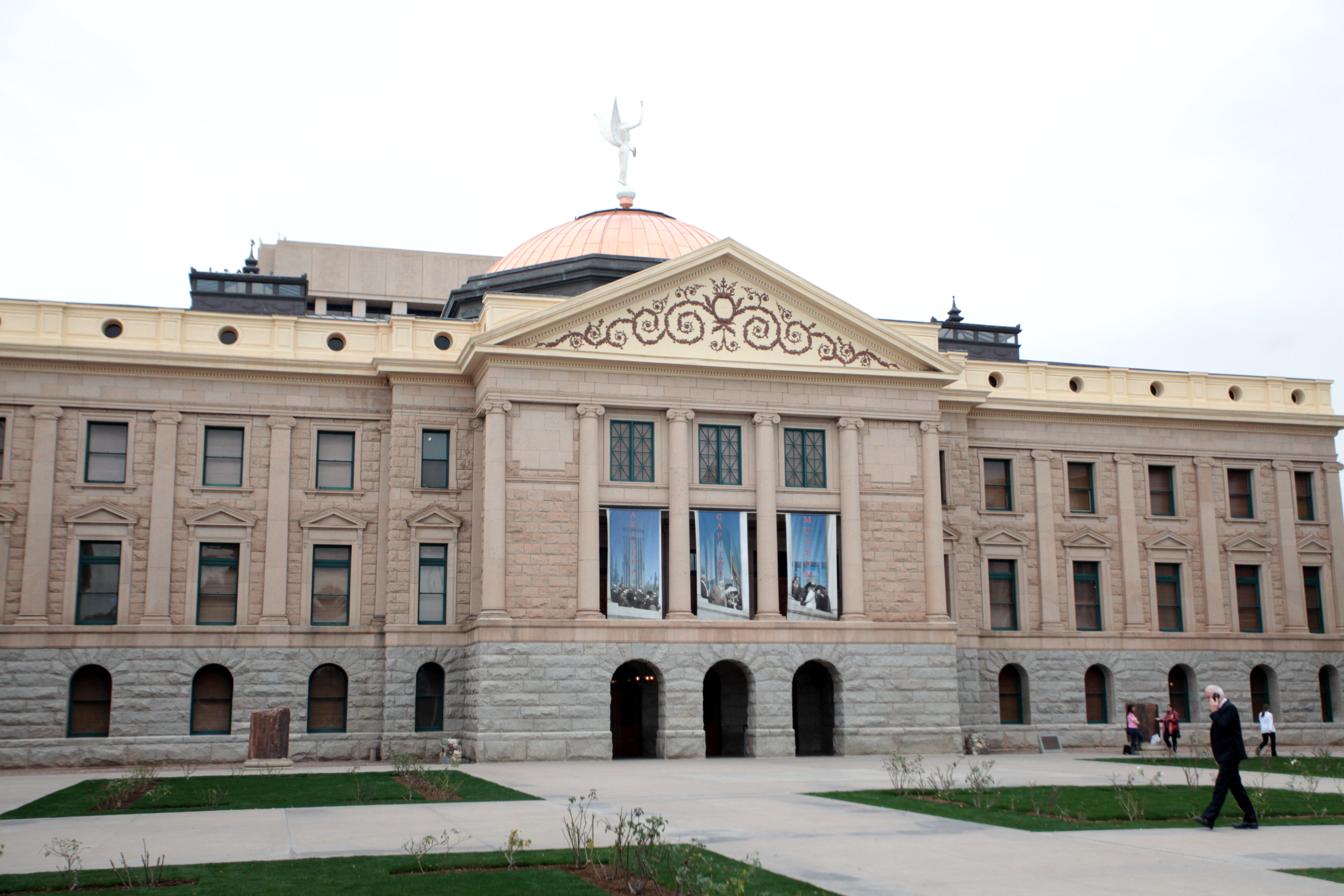
The Arizona State Capitol in Phoenix (2021)

Members of the Arizona Legislature are elected from 30 districts, each of which elect one senator and two representatives. Members of both chambers serve two-year terms. Since 1993, all legislators are term limited to eight consecutive years in office, but can run again after two years or run for the opposite house than the one in which they serve.

== List of districts ==
The 30 legislative districts in Arizona following redistricting after the 2020 United States census:

No.	Map	County(ies)	Senator (Residence)	Representatives (Residence)
1st		Coconino; Yavapai	Mark Finchem (R)	Quang Nguyen (R)
1st		Coconino; Yavapai	Mark Finchem (R)	Selina Bliss (R) (Prescott)
2nd		Maricopa	Shawnna Bolick (R) (Phoenix)	Stephanie Simacek (D)
2nd		Maricopa	Shawnna Bolick (R) (Phoenix)	Justin Wilmeth (R) (Phoenix)
3rd		Maricopa	John Kavanagh (R)	Cody Reim (R)
3rd		Maricopa	John Kavanagh (R)	Alexander Kolodin (R)
4th		Maricopa	Carine Werner (R)	Matt Gress (R)
4th		Maricopa	Carine Werner (R)	Pamela Carter (R)
5th		Maricopa	Lela Alston (D) (Phoenix)	Sarah Liguori (D)
5th		Maricopa	Lela Alston (D) (Phoenix)	Aaron Márquez (D)
6th		Apache; Coconino; Gila; Graham; Mohave; Navajo; Pinal	Theresa Hatathlie (D)	Myron Tsosie (D) (Chinle)
6th		Apache; Coconino; Gila; Graham; Mohave; Navajo; Pinal	Theresa Hatathlie (D)	Mae Peshlakai (D)
7th		Coconino; Gila; Navajo; Pinal	Wendy Rogers (R)	Walter Blackman (R)
7th		Coconino; Gila; Navajo; Pinal	Wendy Rogers (R)	Sylvia Allen (R)
8th		Maricopa	Lauren Kuby (D) (Tempe)	Janeen Connolly (D)
8th		Maricopa	Lauren Kuby (D) (Tempe)	Brian Garcia (D)
9th		Maricopa	Kiana Sears (D) (Mesa)	Lorena Austin (D)
9th		Maricopa	Kiana Sears (D) (Mesa)	Seth Blattman (D)
10th		Maricopa; Pinal	Dave Farnsworth (R)	Ralph Heap (R)
10th		Maricopa; Pinal	Dave Farnsworth (R)	Justin Olson (R)
11th		Maricopa	Catherine Miranda (D)	Junelle Cavero (D)
11th		Maricopa	Catherine Miranda (D)	Oscar De Los Santos (D)
12th		Maricopa	Mitzi Epstein (D)	Patty Contreras (D)
12th		Maricopa	Mitzi Epstein (D)	Stacey Travers (D)
13th		Maricopa	J. D. Mesnard (R) (Chandler)	Jeff Weninger (R) (Chandler)
13th		Maricopa	J. D. Mesnard (R) (Chandler)	Julie Willoughby (R)
14th		Maricopa	Warren Petersen (R) (Gilbert)	Khyl Powell (R)
14th		Maricopa	Warren Petersen (R) (Gilbert)	Laurin Hendrix (R)
15th		Maricopa; Pinal	Jake Hoffman (R)	Michael Way (R)
15th		Maricopa; Pinal	Jake Hoffman (R)	Neal Carter (R)
16th		Maricopa; Pima; Pinal	T. J. Shope (R) (Coolidge)	Teresa Martinez (R)
16th		Maricopa; Pima; Pinal	T. J. Shope (R) (Coolidge)	Chris Lopez (R)
17th		Pima; Pinal	Vince Leach (R) (Saddlebrooke)	Rachel Keshel (R)
17th		Pima; Pinal	Vince Leach (R) (Saddlebrooke)	Kevin Volk (D)
18th		Pima	Priya Sundareshan (D)	Christopher Mathis (D) (Tucson)
18th		Pima	Priya Sundareshan (D)	Nancy Gutierrez (D)
19th		Cochise; Graham; Greenlee; Pima; Santa Cruz	David Gowan (R) (Sierra Vista)	Gail Griffin (R)
19th		Cochise; Graham; Greenlee; Pima; Santa Cruz	David Gowan (R) (Sierra Vista)	Lupe Diaz (R)
20th		Pima	Sally Ann Gonzales (D) (Tucson)	Betty Villegas (D)
20th		Pima	Sally Ann Gonzales (D) (Tucson)	Alma Hernandez (D) (Tucson)
21st		Cochise; Pima; Santa Cruz	Rosanna Gabaldón (D) (Sahuarita)	Consuelo Hernandez (D)
21st		Cochise; Pima; Santa Cruz	Rosanna Gabaldón (D) (Sahuarita)	Stephanie Stahl Hamilton (D)
22nd		Maricopa	Eva Diaz (D)	Lupe Contreras (D) (Cashion)
22nd		Maricopa	Eva Diaz (D)	Elda Luna-Nájera (D)
23rd		Maricopa; Pima; Pinal; Yuma	Brian Fernandez (D)	Mariana Sandoval (D)
23rd		Maricopa; Pima; Pinal; Yuma	Brian Fernandez (D)	Michele Pena (R)
24th		Maricopa	Analise Ortiz (D)	Lydia Hernandez (D)
24th		Maricopa	Analise Ortiz (D)	Anna Abeytia (D)
25th		Maricopa; Yuma	Tim Dunn (R)	Nick Kupper (R)
25th		Maricopa; Yuma	Tim Dunn (R)	Michael Carbone (R)
26th		Maricopa	Flavio Bravo (D) (Phoenix)	Cesar Aguilar (D)
26th		Maricopa	Flavio Bravo (D) (Phoenix)	Quantá Crews (D)
27th		Maricopa	Kevin Payne (R)	Lisa Fink (R)
27th		Maricopa	Kevin Payne (R)	Tony Rivero (R)
28th		Maricopa	Frank Carroll (R)	David Livingston (R) (Peoria)
28th		Maricopa	Frank Carroll (R)	Beverly Pingerelli (R) (Peoria)
29th		Maricopa	Janae Shamp (R)	Steve Montenegro (R)
29th		Maricopa	Janae Shamp (R)	James Taylor (R)
30th		La Paz; Maricopa; Mohave	Hildy Angius (R) (Bullhead City)	Leo Biasiucci (R)
30th		La Paz; Maricopa; Mohave	Hildy Angius (R) (Bullhead City)	John Gillette (R)

== See also ==
- List of Arizona state legislatures
