= Tammy Caputi =

American politician

Member-elect of the Arizona House of Representatives from the 4th district
- Assuming office January 2027
- Succeeding: Matt Gress

Personal details
- Party: Democratic
- Website: Campaign website

Tammy Caputi is an American politician. She has a bachelor's degree in economics and women's studies from Wellesley College and an MBA from Simmons University School of Management. A member of the Democratic Party, she is the member-elect for the 4th district of the Arizona House of Representatives. She was elected in the 2026 election. She is a business owner and community leader from Scottsdale, Arizona. She was a member of the City Council in Scottsdale.

== See also ==
- List of representatives and senators of the Arizona Legislature by district, 2023–2033
