= Holly Lyon =

American politician

Member-elect of the Arizona House of Representatives from the 17th district
- Assuming office January 2027
- Succeeding: Rachel Keshel

Personal details
- Party: Democratic
- Website: Campaign website

Hollace "Holly" Lyon is an American politician. A member of the Democratic Party, she is the member-elect for the 17th district of the Arizona House of Representatives. She was elected in the 2026 election. She is a retired U.S. Air Force Lt. Colonel and former educator.

== See also ==
- List of representatives and senators of the Arizona Legislature by district, 2023–2033
