= Tyler Farnsworth =

American politician

Member-elect of the Arizona House of Representatives from the 14th district
- Assuming office January 2027
- Succeeding: Khyl Powell

Personal details
- Party: Republican
- Website: Campaign website

Tyler Farnsworth is an American politician. A member of the Republican Party, he is the member-elect for the 14th district of the Arizona House of Representatives. He was elected in the 2026 election. He is a marketing executive based in Gilbert, Arizona.

== See also ==
- List of representatives and senators of the Arizona Legislature by district, 2023–2033
