= Deborah Howard (politician) =

American politician

Member-elect of the Arizona House of Representatives from the 27th district
- Assuming office January 2027
- Succeeding: Tony Rivero

Personal details
- Party: Democratic
- Website: Campaign website

Deborah Howard is an American politician. A member of the Democratic Party, she is the member-elect for the 27th district of the Arizona House of Representatives. She was elected in the 2026 election. She is the daughter of two World War II veterans. She moved to Arizona in the 2010s.

== See also ==
- List of representatives and senators of the Arizona Legislature by district, 2023–2033
