= Julia Romero Gusse =

American politician

Member-elect of the Arizona House of Representatives from the 16th district
- Assuming office January 2027
- Succeeding: Chris Lopez

Personal details
- Party: Democratic
- Website: Campaign website

Julia Romero Gusse is an American politician. A member of the Democratic Party, she is the member-elect for the 16th district of the Arizona House of Representatives. She was elected in the 2026 election. She is a U.S. Air Force veteran and former Maricopa City councilmember.

== See also ==
- List of representatives and senators of the Arizona Legislature by district, 2023–2033
