= Karen Gresham =

American politician

Member-elect of the Arizona House of Representatives from the 4th district
- Assuming office January 2027
- Succeeding: Pamela Carter

Personal details
- Party: Democratic
- Education: Arizona State University
- Website: Campaign website

Karen Gresham is an American politician. A member of the Democratic Party, she is the member-elect for the 4th district of the Arizona House of Representatives. She was elected in the 2026 election. She graduated from Arizona State University.

== See also ==
- List of representatives and senators of the Arizona Legislature by district, 2023–2033
