= Emilia Cortez =

American politician

Member-elect of the Arizona House of Representatives from the 23rd district
- Assuming office January 2027
- Succeeding: Michele Peña

Personal details
- Party: Democratic
- Website: Campaign website

Emilia Cortez is an American politician. A member of the Democratic Party, she is the member-elect for the 23rd district of the Arizona House of Representatives. She was elected in the 2026 election. She was a candidate for Yuma County Recorder in the 2024 election. Cortez is a member of the Latino community. She is bilingual. Her background is in business, community service on local boards, including as an economic development specialist for the Quechan Tribe. She is Director of Yuma County Girl Scouts.

== See also ==
- List of representatives and senators of the Arizona Legislature by district, 2023–2033
