= George Khalaf =

American politician

- Khalaf in 2026

Member-elect of the Arizona House of Representatives from the 3rd district
- Assuming office January 2027
- Succeeding: Alexander Kolodin

Personal details
- Born: 1990 or 1991 (age 34–35) Lebanon
- Party: Republican

George Khalaf (born 1990 or 1991) is an American pollster and politician. A member of the Republican Party, he is the member-elect for the 3rd district of the Arizona House of Representatives.

== Early life and education ==
Khalaf was born in Lebanon and immigrated to the United States with his parents at 5-years old in 1996 following the Lebanese Civil War. He graduated from Dobson High School and attended Arizona State University under the school's President Barack Obama Scholars scholarship for low-income Arizonans.

== Political career ==
=== Polling and consulting ===
Khalaf serves as president of conservative political polling firm Data Orbital, which he founded in 2014, and managing partner of conservative political strategy firm The Resolute Group. In August 2024, Khalaf and The Resolute Group agreed to pay back $120,000 to Republican consulting firm Targeted Victory after the latter firm sued them for blocking payments for consulting work on Mark Brnovich‘s 2022 U.S. Senate campaign. Writing in The Nation in November 2024, Sasha Abramsky noted that Data Orbital had appeared to release numerous unreliable polls to purposefully shift polling averages toward Republican candidates in Arizona elections in 2024 and 2022.

=== Arizona House of Representatives ===
In November 2025, Khalaf announced his campaign for the 3rd district of the Arizona House of Representatives. In March 2026, he was one of three candidates put forward to the Maricopa County Board of Supervisors by the local Republican precinct committee to replace incumbent state representative Joseph Chaplik, who resigned. The board ultimately appointed Cody Reim, who was also a candidate in the regularly-scheduled Republican primary election. Khalaf and Reim placed first and second in the Republican primary election, respectively.

== Personal life ==
Khalaf's father, Youssef, served as Kari Lake's campaign treasurer and chairman of Securing Arizona, which The Arizona Republic reported had engaged in a straw donor scheme directing masked donations to Lake and payments to The Resolute Group.
