= Arizona's 3rd legislative district =

American legislative district

- Map of District 3: Approved January 21, 2022
- Senator: John Kavanagh (R)
- House members: Cody Reim (R); Alexander Kolodin (R)
- Registration: 48.69% Republican; 19.41% Democratic; 30.69% Other
- Demographics: 83% White; 2% Black/African American; 1% Native American; 5% Asian; 7% Hispanic
- Population: 236,955
- Voting-age population: 195,367
- Registered voters: 175,721

Arizona's 3rd legislative district is one of 30 legislative districts in the U.S. state of Arizona. It encompasses a portion of Maricopa County, including part of the city of Scottsdale and the communities of Fountain Hills and Anthem.

The district is represented in the 57th Arizona State Legislature by John Kavanagh in the Arizona Senate and by Joseph Chaplik and Alexander Kolodin in the Arizona House of Representatives, all Republicans.

According to the Arizona Independent Redistricting Commission (AIRC), District 3 leans Republican and is considered non-competitive. Following the 2020 United States census, the district had a total population of 236,955.

== Political representation ==
=== Arizona Senate ===
Name	Party	Term	Legislature	Notes
District created January 22, 1970
Roy Palmer	Republican	1971–1972	30th	
Arthur J. Hubbard Sr.	Democratic	1973–1984	31st 32nd 33rd 34th 35th 36th	
James Henderson Jr.	Democratic	1985–1998	37th 38th 39th 40th 41st 42nd 43rd	
Jack C. Jackson	Democratic	1999–2002	44th 45th	
Linda Binder	Republican	2003–2004	46th	
Ron Gould	Republican	2005–2012	47th 48th 49th 50th	
Olivia Cajero Bedford	Democratic	2013–2018	51st 52nd 53rd	
Sally Ann Gonzales	Democratic	2019–2022	54th 55th	
John Kavanagh	Republican	since 2023	56th 57th	

=== Arizona House of Representatives ===
Name	Party	Term	Legislature	Notes
District created January 22, 1970
Boyd A. Shumway	Democratic	1969–1972	30th	(Note: Shumway previously served in the 29th Legislature as one of 4 state representatives representing Apache, Navajo, and Greenlee Counties.)
Glen L. Flake	Democratic	1971–1972	30th	
Benjamin Hanley	Democratic	1973–1998	31st 32nd 33rd 34th 35th 36th 37th 38th 39th 40th 41st 42nd 43rd	
Jack A. Brown	Democratic	1973–1974	31st	
Daniel Peaches	Republican	1975–1984	32nd 33rd 34th 35th 36th	
Jack C. Jackson	Democratic	1985–1998	37th 38th 39th 40th 41st 42nd 43rd	
Sylvia Laughter	Democratic	1999–2002	44th 45th	
Tom Gordon	Republican	1999–2000	44th	
Albert Tom	Democratic	2001–2002	45th	
Joe Hart	Republican	2003–2004	46th	
Bill Wagner III	Republican	2003–2004	46th	
Nancy McLain	Republican	2005–2012	47th 48th 49th 50th	
Trish Groe	Republican	2005–2008	47th 48th	
Doris Goodale	Republican	2009–2012	49th 50th	
Sally Ann Gonzales	Democratic	2013–2018	51st 52nd 53rd	
Macario Saldate	Democratic	2013–2018	51st 52nd 53rd	
Alma Hernandez	Democratic	2019–2022	54th 55th	
Andrés Cano	Democratic	2019–2022	54th 55th	
Joseph Chaplik	Republican	since 2023	56th 57th	
Alexander Kolodin	Republican	since 2023	56th 57th	

== Election results ==
Following the 2020 United States redistricting cycle, the AIRC redrew legislative district boundaries in Arizona. The 2022 elections were the first held in the newly redrawn District 3.

=== Arizona Senate ===
2026 Arizona Senate election, 3rd district
Party	Candidate	Votes	%
Republican	John Kavanagh (incumbent)		
Democratic	Jeffrey Fortney		
Republican	Frank Bertone (write-in)		
Republican hold			

2024 Arizona Senate election, 3rd district
Party	Candidate	Votes	%
Republican	John Kavanagh (incumbent)	110,048	100.00
Total votes		110,048	100.00
Republican hold			

2022 Arizona Senate election, 3rd district
Party	Candidate	Votes	%
Republican	John Kavanagh	84,277	63.18
Democratic	Thomas Dugger	49,115	36.82
Total votes		133,392	100.00
Republican hold			

=== Arizona House of Representatives ===
2026 Arizona House of Representatives election, 3rd district
Party	Candidate	Votes	%
Republican	Cody Reim		
Republican	George Khalaf		
Democratic	Julie Gable		
Democratic	Richard "Rick" Robert Spargo		
No Labels Party of Arizona	John Skirbst		
Republican hold			
Republican hold			

2024 Arizona House of Representatives election, 3rd district
Party	Candidate	Votes	%
Republican	Joseph Chaplik (incumbent)	93,596	39.38
Republican	Alexander Kolodin (incumbent)	88,693	37.32
Democratic	Richard Corles	55,372	23.30
Total votes		237,661	100.00
Republican hold			
Republican hold			

2022 Arizona House of Representatives election, 3rd district
Party	Candidate	Votes	%
Republican	Joseph Chaplik (incumbent)	78,390	51.70
Republican	Alexander Kolodin	72,165	47.59
Total votes		150,555	100.00
Republican hold			
Republican hold			

== See also ==
- List of Arizona legislative districts
- Arizona State Legislature
