= Nesting (voting districts) =

Delimitation of voting districts

Example of nested districts in the Wyoming Legislature. The city of Rock Springs is split into northern and southern State House districts, which combine into a single State Senate district.

Nesting is the delimitation of voting districts for one elected body in order to define the voting districts for another body.

The major concerns of nesting are that it may impede the creation of majority-minority districts, and that it may cause cities or other communities of interest to be split into different voting districts and therefore dilute their votes.

== By country ==
=== Fiji ===
Under the 1970 constitution, Fiji had ten National constituencies. Each of them elected one indigenous Fijian member and one Indo-Fijian member on its own, but two national constituencies were nested into one for the election of General electors' representatives.

=== Poland ===
Electoral districts for the Parliament of Poland are nested, with each of the multi-member Sejm districts split into two or three single-member Senate districts (except for Sejm Constituency no. 12 which is a single Senate district).

=== United Kingdom ===
The Scottish Parliament and Senedd Cymru are elected using an Additional member system, combining single-member constituencies with a party-list component chosen to ensure overall proportional representation across the chamber. To elect this proportional component, single-member constituencies are nested together within larger multi-member regions. In addition, the single-member constituencies in the Senedd are identical to those used for the UK House of Commons; this was also the case in Scotland until the Fifth Periodic Review of Westminster constituencies.

=== United States ===
Law requires nesting of state house districts in state senate districts Law suggests nesting of state house districts in state senate districts even ratios of state house to state senate districts but no legal provision for nesting has uneven lower-upper house legislative ratio but legally encourages nesting between both as well as with congressional districts

The US states which have nesting in their state legislatures (with the ratio of lower house to upper):

- Alaska (2/1)
- Arizona (2/1) (districts are identical)
- Illinois (2/1)
- Iowa (2/1)
- Maryland (3/1) (29 of 47 districts are identical)
- Minnesota (2/1)
- Montana (2/1)
- New Jersey (2/1) (districts are identical)
- North Dakota (2/1) (46 of 47 districts are identical)
- Ohio (3/1)
- Oregon (2/1)
- South Dakota (2/1) (33 of 35 districts are identical)
- Washington (2/1) (districts are identical)
- Wisconsin (3/1)

In addition there are four states with exact ratios (California, Hawaii, New York, and Wyoming) that encourage, but do not require, nesting of legislative districts. Two other states with uneven lower-upper house ratios (Rhode Island and Utah) encourage nesting between legislative and congressional districts. Five other states (Florida, Idaho, Indiana, Nevada and Tennessee) have a lower-to-upper house seat ratio of either 2:1 or 3:1, but do not feature nesting in their laws on redistricting.
