= Ian Teller =

American politician

Member-elect of the Arizona House of Representatives from the 6th district
- Assuming office January 2027
- Succeeding: Myron Tsosie

Personal details
- Party: Democratic
- Education: Fort Lewis College; University of Southern California

Ian Teller is an American politician. A member of the Democratic Party, he is the member-elect for the 6th district of the Arizona House of Representatives.

Teller attended Fort Lewis College, earning his bachelor's degree in business administration. He also attended the University of Southern California, earning his master's degree in music.
