= Betsy Munoz =

American politician

Member-elect of the Arizona House of Representatives from the 22nd district
- Assuming office January 2027
- Succeeding: Lupe Contreras

Personal details
- Party: Democratic

Betsy Munoz is an American politician. A member of the Democratic Party, she is the member-elect for the 22nd district of the Arizona House of Representatives.
