= Armando Montero =

American politician

Member-elect of the Arizona House of Representatives from the 12th district
- Assuming office January 2027
- Succeeding: Patty Contreras

Personal details
- Party: Democratic

Armando Montero is an American politician. A member of the Democratic Party, he is the member-elect for the 12th district of the Arizona House of Representatives.
