= Jacob Weinberg (politician) =

American politician

Member-elect of the Arizona House of Representatives from the 13th district
- Assuming office January 2027
- Succeeding: Julie Willoughby

Personal details
- Party: Democratic
- Education: University of Arizona (BA); University of Illinois Chicago (MBA); University of Illinois Urbana-Champaign (MS); Harvard Extension School (MLA)

Jacob Weinberg is an American politician. A member of the Democratic Party, he is the member-elect for the 13th district of the Arizona House of Representatives.
