= James Rogers (Arizona politician) =

American politician

Member-elect of the Arizona House of Representatives from the 10th district
- Assuming office January 2027
- Succeeding: Ralph Heap

Personal details
- Party: Republican
- Education: Brigham Young University; University of Cambridge; Harvard Law School

James Rogers is an American politician. A member of the Republican Party, he is the member-elect for the 10th district of the Arizona House of Representatives.

Rogers attended the University of Cambridge, earning his graduate degree in 2008. He also attended Harvard Law School, earning his Juris Doctor degree in 2009. He earned his BA from Brigham Young University.
