= Miranda Lopez =

American politician

Member-elect of the Arizona House of Representatives from the 21st district
- Assuming office January 2027
- Succeeding: Stephanie Stahl Hamilton

Personal details
- Party: Democratic

Miranda Lopez is an American politician. A member of the Democratic Party, she is the member-elect for the 21st district of the Arizona House of Representatives.

== Career ==
In 2026, Lopez defeated incumbent state representative Stephanie Stahl Hamilton in the Demcoratic primary. She was endorsed by the Tuscon Democratic Socialists of America and was a part of the "No Safe Seats" slate led by state senator Analise Ortiz.
