= Racquel Armstrong =

American politician

Member-elect of the Arizona House of Representatives from the 13th district
- Assuming office January 2027
- Succeeding: Jeff Weninger

Personal details
- Party: Democratic

Racquel Armstrong is an American politician. A member of the Democratic Party, she is the member-elect for the 13th district of the Arizona House of Representatives.
