= David Rose (American politician) =

American politician

Member-elect of the Arizona House of Representatives from the 30th district
- Assuming office January 2027
- Succeeding: Leo Biasiucci

Personal details
- Party: Republican

David Rose is an American politician. A member of the Republican Party, he is the member-elect for the 30th district of the Arizona House of Representatives.
