= Mike Gannuscio =

American politician

Member-elect of the Arizona House of Representatives from the 30th district
- Assuming office January 2027
- Succeeding: John Gillette

Personal details
- Party: Republican

Mike Gannuscio is an American politician. A member of the Republican Party, he is the member-elect for the 30th district of the Arizona House of Representatives.
