= Arizona's 6th legislative district =

American legislative district

- Map of District 6: Approved January 21, 2022
- Senator: Theresa Hatathlie (D)
- House members: Mae Peshlakai (D); Myron Tsosie (D)
- Registration: 48.33% Democratic; 20.95% Republican; 29.40% Other
- Demographics: 26% White; 1% Black/African American; 61% Native American; 1% Asian; 10% Hispanic
- Population: 225,474
- Voting-age population: 166,613
- Registered voters: 151,306

Arizona's 6th legislative district is one of 30 in the state, consisting of all of Apache County and sections of Coconino County, Gila County, Graham County, Mohave County, Navajo County, and Pinal County. As of 2023, there are 108 precincts in the district, with a total registered voter population of 151,306. The district has an overall population of 225,474.

Following the 2020 United States redistricting cycle, the Arizona Independent Redistricting Commission (AIRC) redrew legislative district boundaries in Arizona. The 6th district was drawn to guarantee a majority Native American constituency, with 61% of residents being non-Hispanic Native Americans. According to the AIRC, the district is outside of competitive range and considered leaning Democratic.

== Political representation ==
The district is represented in the 56th Arizona State Legislature, which convenes from January 1, 2023, to December 31, 2024, by Theresa Hatathlie (D-Coal Mine Mesa) in the Arizona Senate and by Mae Peshlakai (D-Cameron) and Myron Tsosie (D-Chinle) in the Arizona House of Representatives.

Name	Image	Residence	Office	Party
Theresa Hatathlie		Coal Mine Mesa	State senator	Democrat
Mae Peshlakai		Cameron	State representative	Democrat
Myron Tsosie		Chinle	State representative	Democrat

== Election results ==
The 2022 elections were the first in the newly drawn district.

=== Arizona Senate ===
2022 Arizona's 6th Senate district election
Party	Candidate	Votes	%
Democratic	Theresa Hatathlie (incumbent)	58,829	100
Total votes		58,829	100
Democratic hold			

=== Arizona House of Representatives ===
2022 Arizona House of Representatives election, 6th district
Party	Candidate	Votes	%
Democratic	Mae Peshlakai	46,020	50.91
Democratic	Myron Tsosie (incumbent)	44,378	49.09
Total votes		90,398	100.00
Democratic hold			
Democratic hold			

== See also ==
- List of Arizona legislative districts
- Arizona State Legislature
