= Coalmine Canyon, Arizona =

Navajo chapter in Coconino County, Arizona

- Chapter
- Location within the state of Arizona Coalmine Canyon, Arizona (the United States)
- Coordinates: 35°59′36″N 111°01′58″W
- Country: United States
- State: Arizona
- County: Coconino
- Elevation: 6,145 ft (1,873 m)
- Time zone: UTC-7 (Mountain (MST))
  - Summer (DST): UTC-7 (MST)
- Area code: 928
- FIPS code: 04-14520
- GNIS feature ID: 3051

Coalmine Canyon is a chapter and community of the Navajo Nation in Coconino County, Arizona. It has an estimated elevation of 6,145 feet (1,873 m) above sea level. The area was disputed between the Navajo and Hopi, and the community moved the chapter from Coalmine Mesa to Coalmine Canyon in 1998; the former site is now a ghost town.

== Notable people ==
- Faye Tso (1933–2004), Navajo potter and herbal medicine healer.
- Theresa Hatathlie, Arizona State Senator
