= Alexander Kolodin =

American politician (born 1986)

- Kolodin in 2025

Member of the Arizona House of Representatives from the 3rd district
- Incumbent
- Assumed office January 9, 2023 Serving with Cody Reim
- Preceded by: Alma Hernandez
- Succeeded by: George Khalaf (elect)

Personal details
- Born: June 30, 1986 (age 40) Chandler, Arizona, U.S.
- Party: Republican
- Education: Georgetown University (BA); University of Pennsylvania (JD)
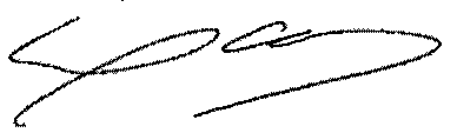
- Signature
- Website: State house website Campaign website

Alexander Kolodin (born June 30, 1986) is an American lawyer and politician serving in the Arizona House of Representatives since 2023. He is a member of the Republican Party, and was the party's nominee for the 2026 Arizona Secretary of State election, losing to incumbent Democrat Adrian Fontes.

Prior to joining the state legislature, Kolodin worked as an attorney representing plaintiffs in lawsuits to overturn the 2020 presidential election results in Arizona. The State Bar of Arizona later admonished him for making cases in bad faith related to the 2020 election.

He was first elected to the Arizona House in 2022 and is a member of the Arizona Freedom Caucus. In the legislature, he has sponsored successful legislation protecting military voters and preventing all Arizonans from losing the ability to vote in the presidential election, he pushed for restrictions on voting, sought to repeal the state’s ban on machine guns and pipe bombs, and authored a successful amendment ending the Rio Verde Foothills water crisis.

== Early life and education ==
Kolodin graduated from Georgetown University, prior to becoming an English and civics teacher. He then attended law school at the University of Pennsylvania. He was a Reagan Fellow at the Goldwater Institute, and also owned his own law practice. He is Jewish.

== Legal career ==
According to Kolodin's campaign website, he began litigating for election integrity in 2014. Before the 2020 election, Kolodin won an Arizona Supreme Court case against Adrian Fontes for sending out instructions that voters could cross out votes, an instruction Kolodin accused Fontes of being ripe to cause fraud.

Kolodin represented those involved in the alternate elector plan, arguing in an August 2022 court filing to block the January 6th committee from accessing the phone records of the Republican Party chair, that "Trump electors simply created a backup plan in case legal challenges to Arizona’s outcome were successful." Kolodin represented the alternate electors as part of a broader effort to overturn the 2020 election in Congress. Kolodin reports on his campaign webpage, "The evidence collected during that trial was used by Congress to decide whether to accept the results of the election - and was a large reason why so many members of Congress objected to the results." Kolodin also represented the CyberNinjas audit team when the Democratic Party attempted to stop the audit.

In April 2023, Kolodin defended lawmaker Liz Harris, a QAnon adherent, who was expelled by the legislature for lying to the ethics committee, as part of a probe investigating Harris inviting a conspiracy theorist to present harmful and damaging information impugning the reputation of fellow legislative members and the LDS church. Kolodin later stated Harris made an error in judgment hosting the hearing which aired several conspiracy theories, but did not address fellow lawmakers' allegations that while before the Ethics Committee, Harris lied about her involvement during the public committee hearing.

In June 2023, Kolodin supported a bill to allow hand counting of votes, thus discouraging the use of voting machines. The same month, Kolodin unsuccessfully sued to end no-excuse mail-in early voting in Arizona. Kolodin represented the group Clean Elections USA after they were involved in a lawsuit for violations of the Voting Rights Act.

Kolodin speaking in 2024

Kolodin also represented the CyberNinjas after it was commissioned by the Arizona Senate to conduct an audit. In 2022, when the House Select Committee to Investigate January 6 subpoenaed the phone records of Republican Party Chair Kelly Ward, Kolodin represented Ward in the appeal before the U.S. Supreme Court to block access to her records.

In 2022, Kolodin successfully represented Congressman Paul Gosar before the Arizona Supreme Court in a suit seeking to bar him from the Arizona ballot on Fourteenth Amendment grounds. The following year, Kolodin praised the ruling, while criticizing Democratic Secretary of State Adrian Fontes, who expressed public disappointment he would not be able to keep former President Donald Trump from appearing on the ballot in Arizona in 2024.

In December 2023, Kolodin received an admonition by the Arizona Bar for his involvement in efforts to overturn the 2020 election, including acting as local Counsel for Sidney Powell's election fraud case in Arizona. The Arizona State Bar directed him to take ethics classes and placed him on probation. Kolodin also filed a lawsuit alleging Sharpies were a cause of ballot fraud in a conspiracy known as #Sharpiegate, which was also scrutinized by the bar.

== Political positions ==
=== Water rights ===
In 2023, Kolodin introduced multiple bills aimed at addressing the water crises both throughout Arizona and particularly in the Rio Verde foothills. These efforts ranged from attempts to guarantee water to the citizens of the Foothills and barring Maricopa County from issuing new building permits to the community while long-term solutions are worked out, amongst others. On April 10, 2023, Kolodin's bill to secure water for Rio Verde passed the House with a bipartisan supermajority. It was eventually signed into law and water was restored.

=== Election reform legislation ===
In 2024, Kolodin sponsored a bill to resolve conflicts between Arizona election law and the federal Electoral Count Reform Act of 2022. The bill, which was ultimately signed into law, was touted by supporters as "put[ting] into law critical election integrity reforms to improve election procedures and strengthen voter confidence" such as legally binding signature verification rules for confirming the identity of early voters, the public posting of the system log files, and improvements to the chain of custody for handling ballots. Governor Katie Hobbs acknowledged that she "really didn’t get anything out of the deal[,]" but nonetheless touted the bill as a "bipartisan compromise[.]"

=== Technology companies and censorship ===
On September 4, 2023, Kolodin and Kari Lake supported findings presented in the House Big Tech Committee meeting that Google played a substantial role in election influence. In the hearing a psychology researcher explained that Google played a role in shaping the 2016 election to favor Hillary Clinton and in 2022 cost Kari Lake her election. In 2016 Clinton hired Google CEO Eric Schmidt as her tech advisor.

=== Firearms ===
Kolodin sponsored a bill to repeal Arizona's ban on several types of firearms and explosive devices, including machine guns, silencers, and sawed-off shotguns. While federal outlaw already outlaws many of these devices, Kolodin said: "If the feds want to infringe on our Second Amendment rights, they can darn well pay for doing that themselves, and we’re not going to have Arizona law enforcement do it." He also advanced a proposal to proposal to bring back executions by firing squad.

== Elections ==
- 2022: Kolodin and Joseph Chaplik won a crowded primary, including defeating former State Representative Darin Mitchell. They went on to run unopposed in the general election.
