= Arizona State Legislature =

Legislative branch of the state government of Arizona

Coordinates: 33°26′53″N 112°5′47″W

- 57th Arizona Legislature

Type
- Type: Bicameral
- Houses: Senate; House of Representatives

History
- Founded: February 14, 1912
- Preceded by: Arizona Territorial Legislature
- New session started: January 13, 2025

Leadership
- Senate President: Warren Petersen (R) since January 9, 2023
- House Speaker: Steve Montenegro (R) since January 13, 2025

Structure
- Seats: 90; 30 Senators; 60 Representatives
- Senate political groups: Republican (17); Democratic (13)
- House political groups: Republican (33); Democratic (27)
- Salary: $24,000/per year + per diem

Elections
- Last Senate election: November 5, 2024
- Last House election: November 5, 2024
- Next Senate election: November 3, 2026
- Next House election: November 3, 2026
- Redistricting: Arizona Independent Redistricting Commission

Meeting place
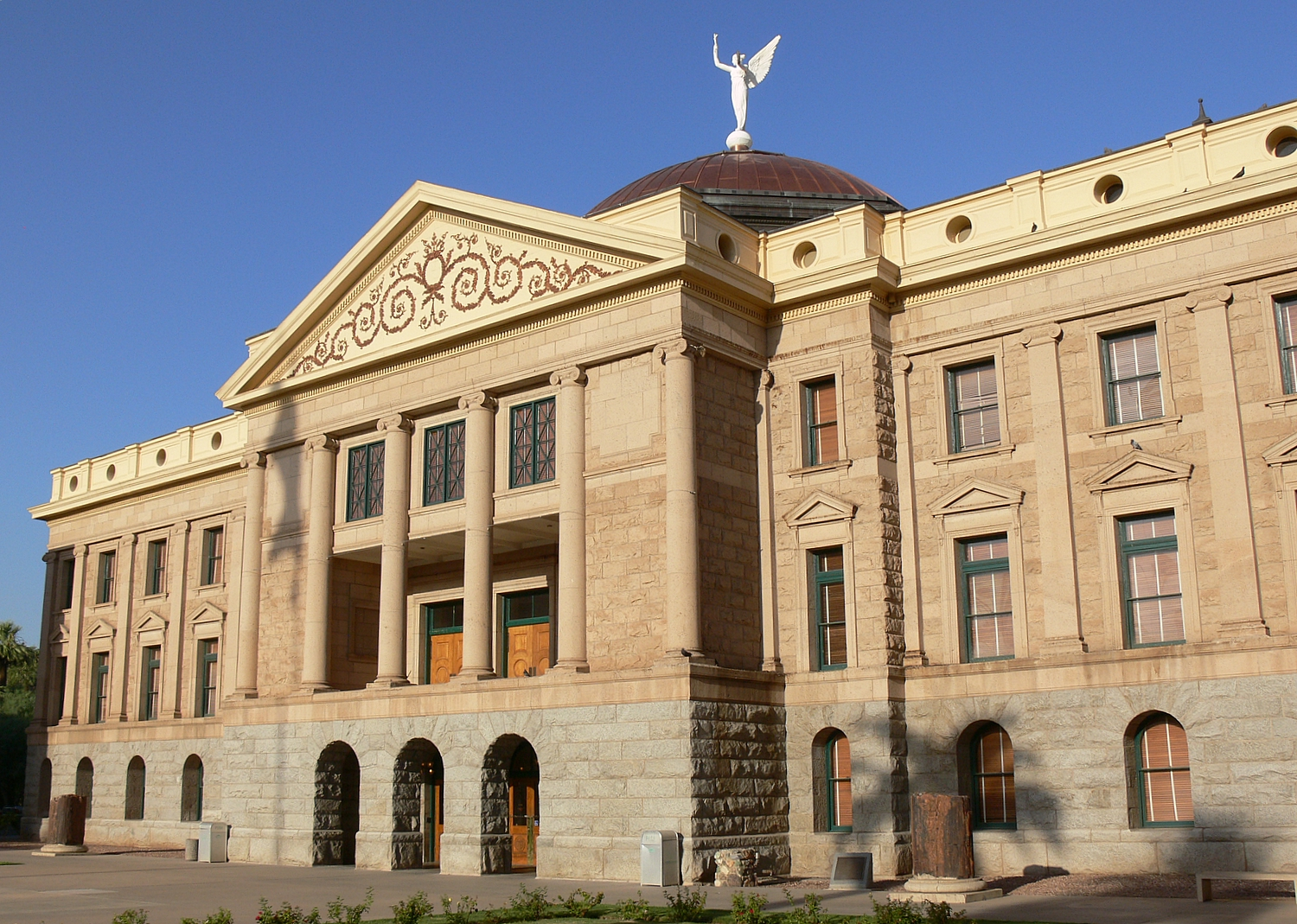
- Arizona State Capitol; 1700 W. Washington St. Phoenix, Arizona • 85007

Website
- Arizona State Legislature

Constitution
- Constitution of Arizona

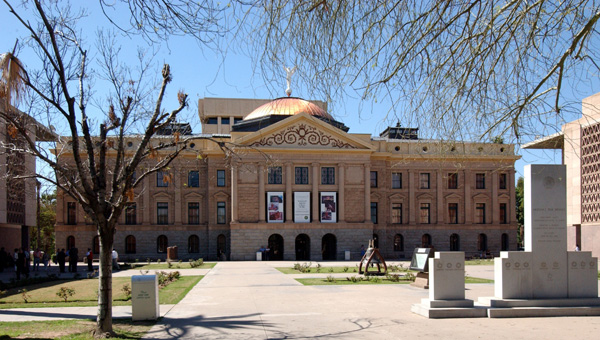
The Arizona State Capitol grounds in Phoenix

The Arizona State Legislature is the state legislature of the U.S. state of Arizona. It is a bicameral legislature that consists of a lower house, the House of Representatives, and an upper house, the Senate. Composed of 90 legislators, the state legislature meets in the Capitol Complex in the state capital of Phoenix. Created by the Arizona Constitution upon statehood in 1912, the Arizona State Legislature met biennially until 1950. Since then they meet annually.

The state is divided into 30 legislative districts, each of which elects one senator and two representatives. Legislators are term-limited to eight consecutive years in office, but can run again after two years, or run for a seat in the other house.

Republicans have narrow majorities in the House and Senate, and all 90 seats of the Legislature are up for re-election on November 3, 2026.

== History ==
=== Pre-statehood ===
Congress formed the New Mexico Territory in 1850, consisting of the land that is now Arizona north of the Gila River, along with what is now New Mexico, parts of Colorado and Nevada. In 1853, the territory expanded under the Gadsden Purchase agreement by nearly 30,000 square miles of land south of the Gila River in Arizona, forming the state’s boundary with Mexico. In 1863, President Abraham Lincoln signed the Arizona Organic Act creating the Territory of Arizona. In 1864, the First Territorial Legislature convened in Prescott, the territory’s first capital. The capital moved from Prescott to Tucson and back to Prescott before being permanently established in Phoenix in 1889.

=== Early years of statehood ===
On June 20, 1910, President William Howard Taft signed the Enabling Act, allowing the Arizona Territory to hold a constitutional convention. Elected Arizona delegates convened in Phoenix at the territorial capitol on October 10, 1910, to draft the Arizona Constitution. Although constitutional provisions for prohibition and women’s suffrage were rejected, voters added both within three years of statehood. The new constitution was ratified by voters on February 9, 1911, and Arizona statehood took place on February 14, 1912, after eliminating a provision to recall judges that caused an initial veto by President Taft. A few months later, voters reinstated the provision permitting the recall of judges.

Arizona's first legislature had 19 state senators and 35 state representatives and convened March 18, 1912. The legislature met on a biennial basis until 1950, when a constitutional amendment provided for annual sessions.

== Legislative process ==
The Arizona Legislature is responsible for making laws in the state of Arizona. The first step in the legislative process is bill drafting. First, legislators must submit a bill request to the legislative council staff. Additionally, a legislator-elect may submit a bill request or private citizens can obtain authorization from a legislator to use the legislator's name before giving instructions to the legislative council staff. The legislative council staff delivers a bill draft to the sponsor or requester and if directed, will prepare the bill for introduction.

Bills undergo three or four readings during the legislative process. After the first reading, they are assigned to committee. Committees can amend measures or hold legislation and prevent it from advancing. Once committee action is completed, the bill undergoes a second hearing and a third hearing, which happens just before the floor vote on it. The bill is then sent to the opposite legislative house for consideration. If approved, without amendment, it is sent to the governor. If there is amendment, however, the first legislative house may either reconsider the bill with amendments or ask for the establishment of a conference committee to work out differences in the versions of the bill passed by each chamber. Once a piece of legislation approved by both houses is forwarded to the governor, it may either be signed or vetoed. If it is signed, it takes effect on the effective date of the legislation. If it is vetoed, lawmakers may override the veto with a vote by a two-thirds majority in both chambers.

Alternatively, instead of presenting the measure to the governor, the legislature may order that it be submitted to the people. If the measure is approved by the people, the Governor has no power to veto it, and the legislature may not repeal it, and may not amend it unless the amending legislation furthers the purposes of such measure and at least three-fourths of the members of each house of the legislature, by a roll call of ayes and nays, vote to amend such measure.

== Leadership ==
The President of the Senate, chosen from Senate membership, chairs the body of the Arizona Senate. Duties include, but are not limited to: calling legislative sessions to order, controlling the Senate Chamber, appointing all standing committees, maintaining order and decorum, signing all acts, writs, subpoenas, resolutions, and more.

Arizona Senate leadership:

- President of the Senate: Warren Petersen (R)
- Majority Leader: Janae Shamp (R)
- Majority Whip: Frank Carroll (R)
- President Pro Tempore: Thomas "T.J." Shope (R)
- Minority Leader: Priya Sundareshan (D)
- Assistant Minority Leader: Catherine Miranda (D)
- Minority Whip: Rosanna Gabaldón (D)
- Minority Caucus Chair: Lela Alston (D)

The body of the Arizona House of Representatives is led by the Speaker, who the members of the House elect from their membership. The Speaker is responsible for calling members to order, maintaining order and decorum, appointing the Speaker Pro Tempore, signing writs, warrants, subpoenas, resolutions, and more.

Arizona House of Representatives leadership:

- Speaker of the House: Steve Montenegro (R)
- Majority Leader: Michael Carbone (R)
- Majority Whip: Julie Willoughby (R)
- Speaker Pro Tempore: Neal Carter (R)
- Minority Leader: Oscar De Los Santos (D)
- Assistant Minority Leader: Nancy Gutierrez (D)
- Minority Whip: Quantá Crews (D)
- Minority Whip: Stacey Travers (D)

== Membership ==
=== Districting ===
There are 30 legislative districts in Arizona, each of which is a multi-member constituency. Each district elects a state senator and two state representatives for a two-year term. The combining of upper and lower house districts into a single constituency is known as nesting.

=== Qualifications ===
Candidates for the Arizona House or Senate must be at least 25 years of age, a resident of the district in which they are running for a minimum of one year, a U.S. citizen, and an Arizona resident for at least three years.

Additionally, it is required to file several documents to qualify on the ballot, including a Statement of Interest, Nomination Paper, Financial Disclosure Statement, and Nomination Petitions. As of January 2, 2024, candidates seeking office without a designated political party affiliation must get a minimum of one half of 1% of all qualified Arizona voters' signatures, while those with no party affiliation must collect the signatures of at least 3% of registered voters who also have no party affiliation.

=== Compensation ===
The annual base salary for all members of the Arizona State Legislature is $24,000. They have not received a raise since 1998. Members receive additional compensation for business expenses related to traveling and staying in the Arizona state capital of Phoenix located in Maricopa County. Lawmakers living in Maricopa County receive $35 per day in subsistence and mileage payments for their first 120 days in office, dropping to $10 per day subsequently. On the other hand, lawmakers living outside of Maricopa County receive a $238 per diem for their first 120 days, which is then cut in half to $119 per day.

=== Term limits ===
On November 3, 1992, Arizona voters overwhelmingly approved Arizona Proposition 107, which subject U.S. senators and representatives, state executive officials, and state legislators to term limits. Members may only serve four consecutive terms (or eight years) in each house; however, once serving the limit, former members are re-eligible for election after a 2-year respite. Members who are term-limited in one house frequently seek election to other positions within the state.

=== Party composition and elections ===
Party division of the legislature since the 1996 elections:

Year	Senate	House
1997–1998	18 R, 12 D	38 R, 22 D
1999–2000	16 R, 14 D	40 R, 20 D
2001–2002	15 R, 15 D	36 R, 24 D
2003–2004	17 R, 13 D	39 R, 21 D
2005–2006	19 R, 11 D	38 R, 22 D
2007–2008	16 R, 14 D	33 R, 27 D
2009–2010	18 R, 12 D	35 R, 25 D
2011–2012	21 R, 9 D	40 R, 20 D
2013–2014	17 R, 13 D	38 R, 22 D
2015–Nov. 2015	17 R, 13 D	36 R, 24 D
Dec. 2015–2016	18 R, 12 D	36 R, 24 D
2017–2018	17 R, 13 D	35 R, 25 D
2019–2020	17 R, 13 D	31 R, 29 D
2021–2022	16 R, 14 D	31 R, 29 D
2023–2024	16 R, 14 D	31 R, 29 D
2025–2026	17 R, 13 D	33 R, 27 D

== See also ==
- List of Arizona state legislatures
