= Kevin Volk =

American politician

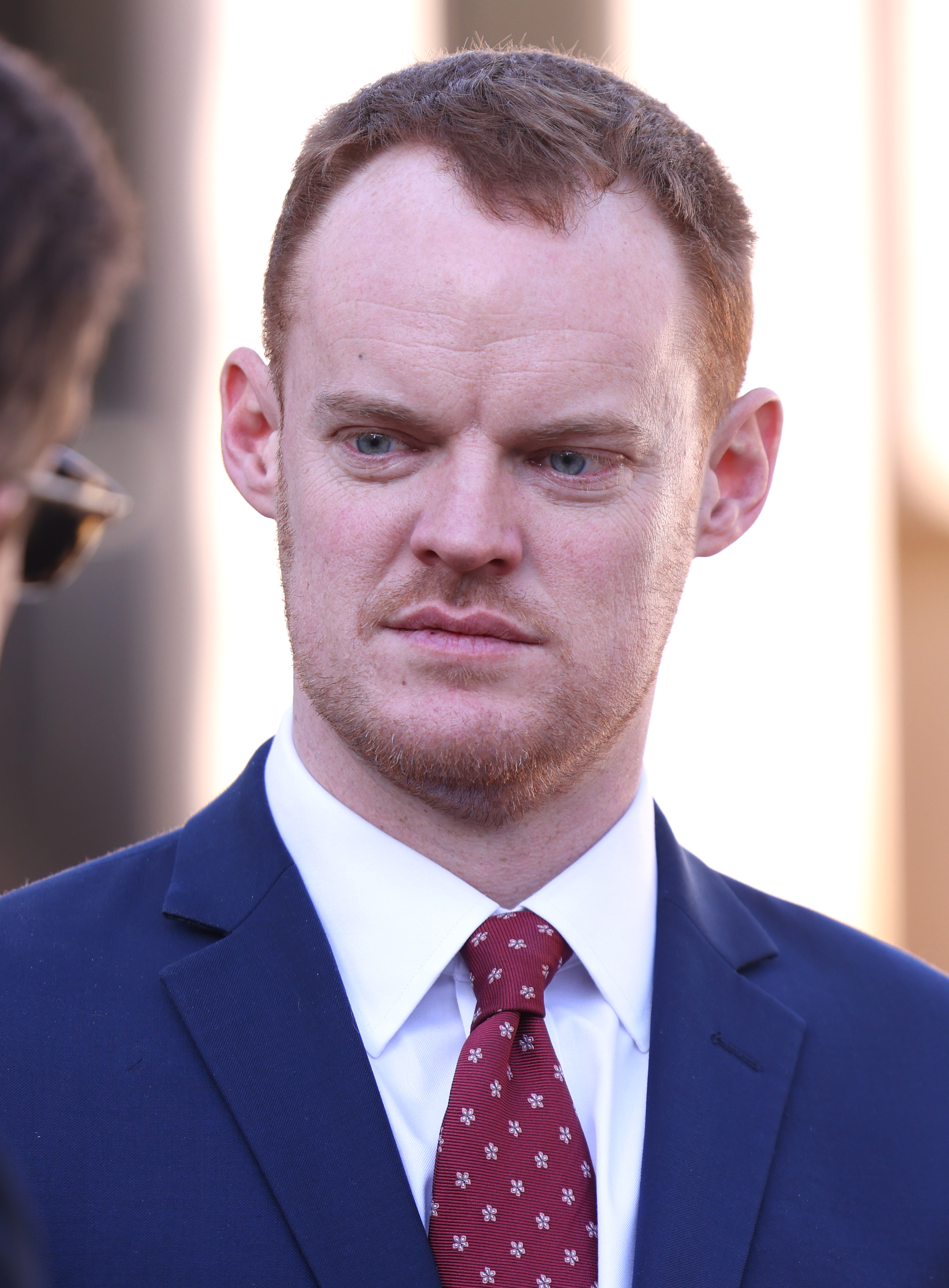
- Volk in 2025

Member of the Arizona House of Representatives from the 17th district
- Incumbent
- Assumed office January 13, 2025 Serving with Rachel Keshel
- Preceded by: Cory McGarr

Personal details
- Party: Democratic

Kevin Volk is an American politician. He serves as a Democratic member for the 17th district of the Arizona House of Representatives.
