= Tony Rivero =

American politician

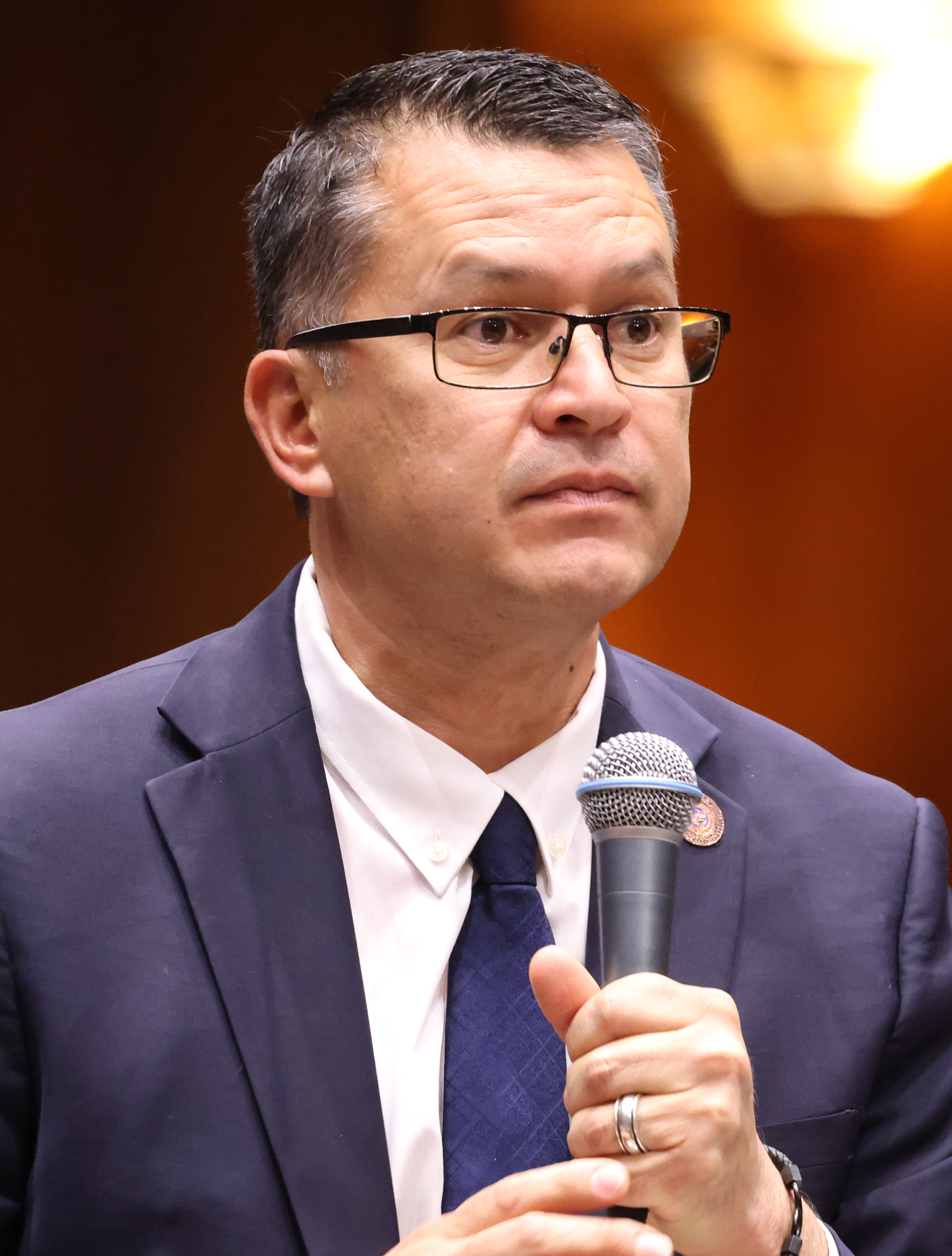
- Rivero in 2025

Member of the Arizona House of Representatives from the 27th district
- Incumbent
- Assumed office January 13, 2025 Serving with Lisa Fink
- Preceded by: Ben Toma
- Succeeded by: Deborah Howard (elect)

Member of the Arizona House of Representatives from the 21st district
- In office January 5, 2015 – January 11, 2021
- Preceded by: Debbie Lesko
- Succeeded by: Beverly Pingerelli

Personal details
- Party: Republican
- Education: Arizona State University (BA, MA); Northern Arizona University (MPA)

Tony Rivero is an American politician and a Republican member of the Arizona House of Representatives representing District 27 since 2025. He previously represented District 21 from 2015 to 2021. In 2017 he was listed as the third most absent member of the Arizona House of Representatives. Rivero previously served on the Peoria, Arizona city council.

== Early life and education ==
Rivero was born and grew up in Peoria, Arizona. He earned a Bachelor of Arts degree in secondary education, political Science, and history and a Master of Arts in political science from Arizona State University, as well as a Master of Public Administration from Northern Arizona University.

== Elections ==
In 2014, Rivero and Rick Gray were unopposed in the Republican primary. Gray and Rivero defeated Esther Duran Lumm in the general election. Republican Bryan Hackbarth was removed from the ballot before the primary, while Helmuth Hack (L) withdrew from the race. Rivero received 27,826 votes.
