= Myron Tsosie =

American politician

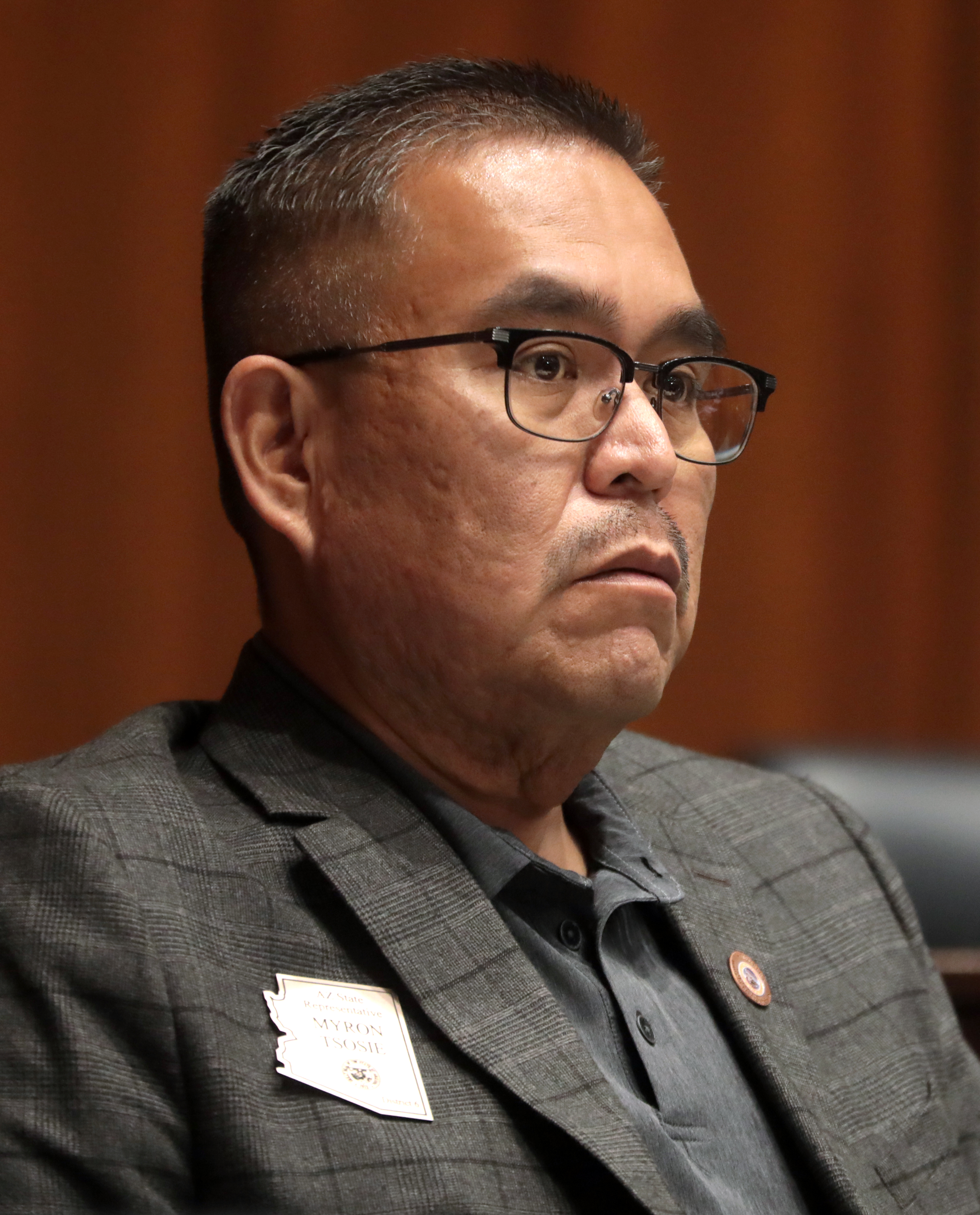

Member of the Arizona House of Representatives
- Incumbent
- Assumed office January 14, 2019 Serving with Jasmine Blackwater-Nygren (2019–2023); Mae Peshlakai (2023–present)
- Preceded by: Eric Descheenie
- Succeeded by: Ian Teller (elect)
- Constituency: 7th district (2019–2023); 6th district (2023–present)

Personal details
- Party: Democratic
- Education: Northern Arizona University

Myron Tsosie is an American politician and a Democratic member of the Arizona House of Representatives representing District 6 since January 9, 2023. He previously represented District 7 from 2019 to 2023. Tsosie was elected in 2018 to succeed retiring State Representative Eric Descheenie. Tsosie is a member of the Navajo Nation.

Tsosie graduated from Northern Arizona University, and was serving on the Chinle Unified School District's governing board prior to his election as a state representative.
