= Khyl Powell =

American politician

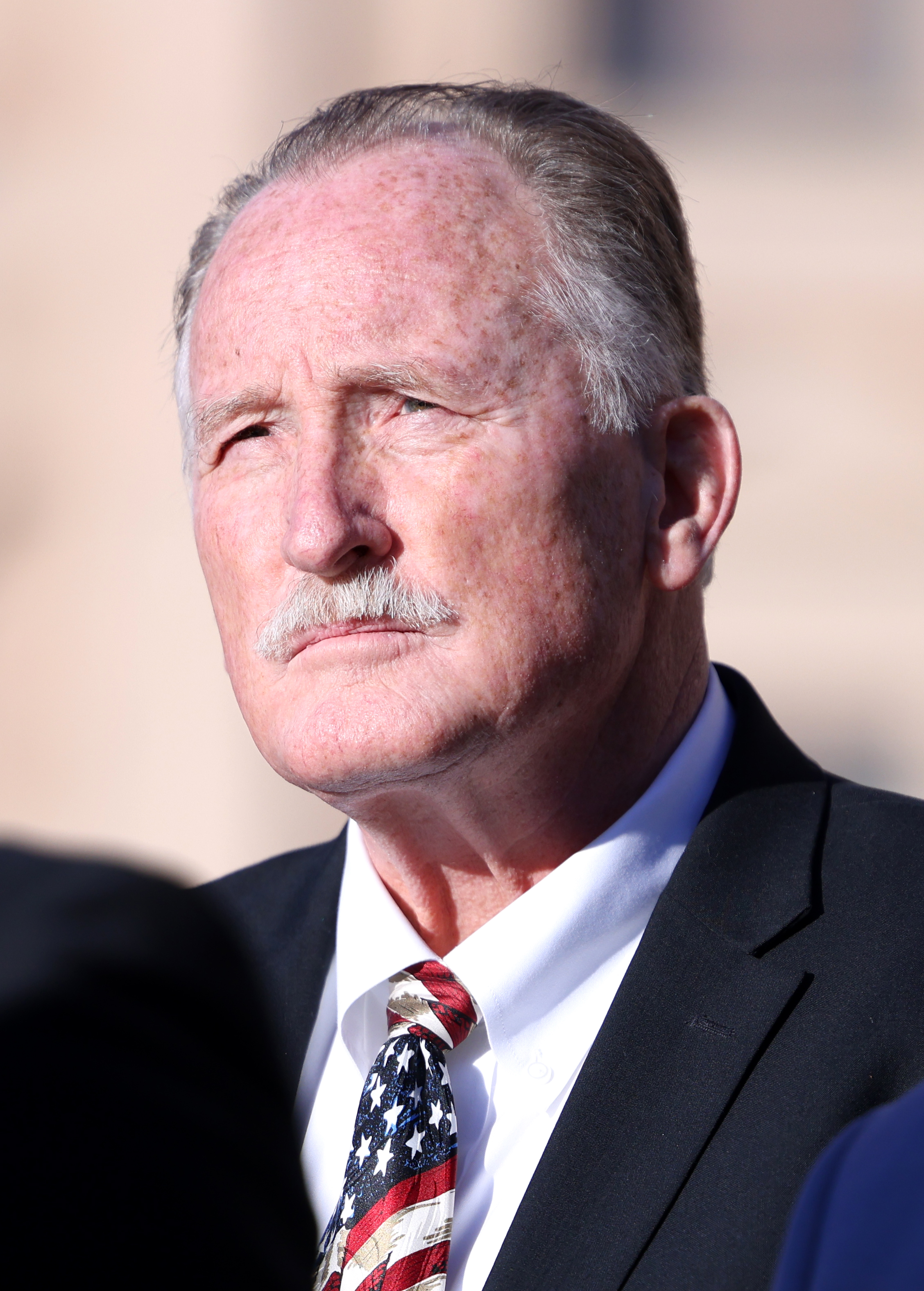
- Powell in 2025

Member of the Arizona House of Representatives from the 14th district
- Incumbent
- Assumed office January 13, 2025 Serving with Laurin Hendrix
- Preceded by: Travis Grantham
- Succeeded by: Tyler Farnsworth (elect)

Personal details
- Party: Republican

Khyl Powell is an American politician. He serves as a Republican member for the 14th district of the Arizona House of Representatives.
