= Aaron Márquez =

American politician

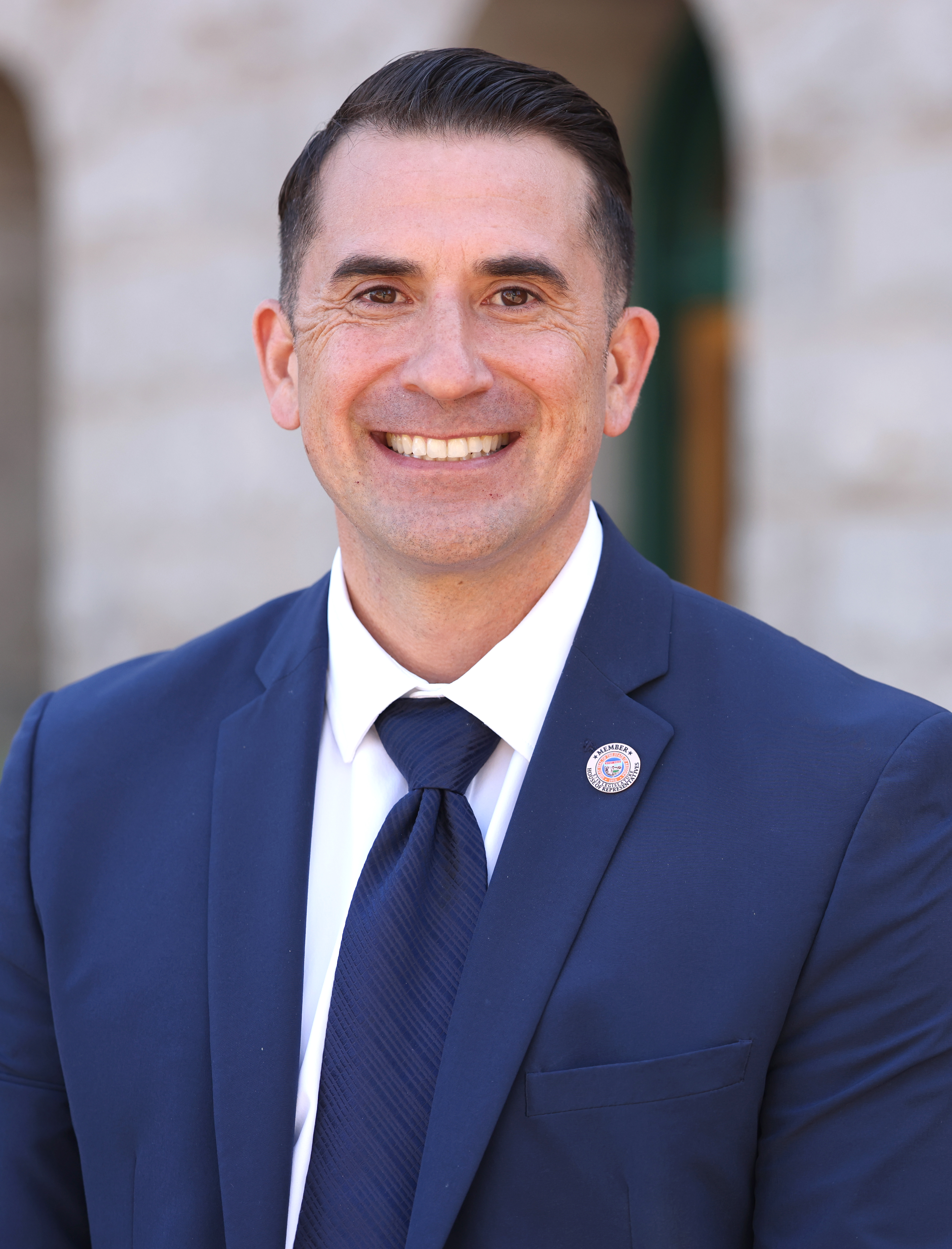
- Márquez in 2025

Member of the Arizona House of Representatives from the 5th district
- Incumbent
- Assumed office January 13, 2025 Serving with Sarah Liguori
- Preceded by: Charles Lucking

Personal details
- Party: Democratic

Aaron Márquez is an American politician. He serves as a Democratic member for the 5th district of the Arizona House of Representatives.
