= Joseph Chaplik =

American politician

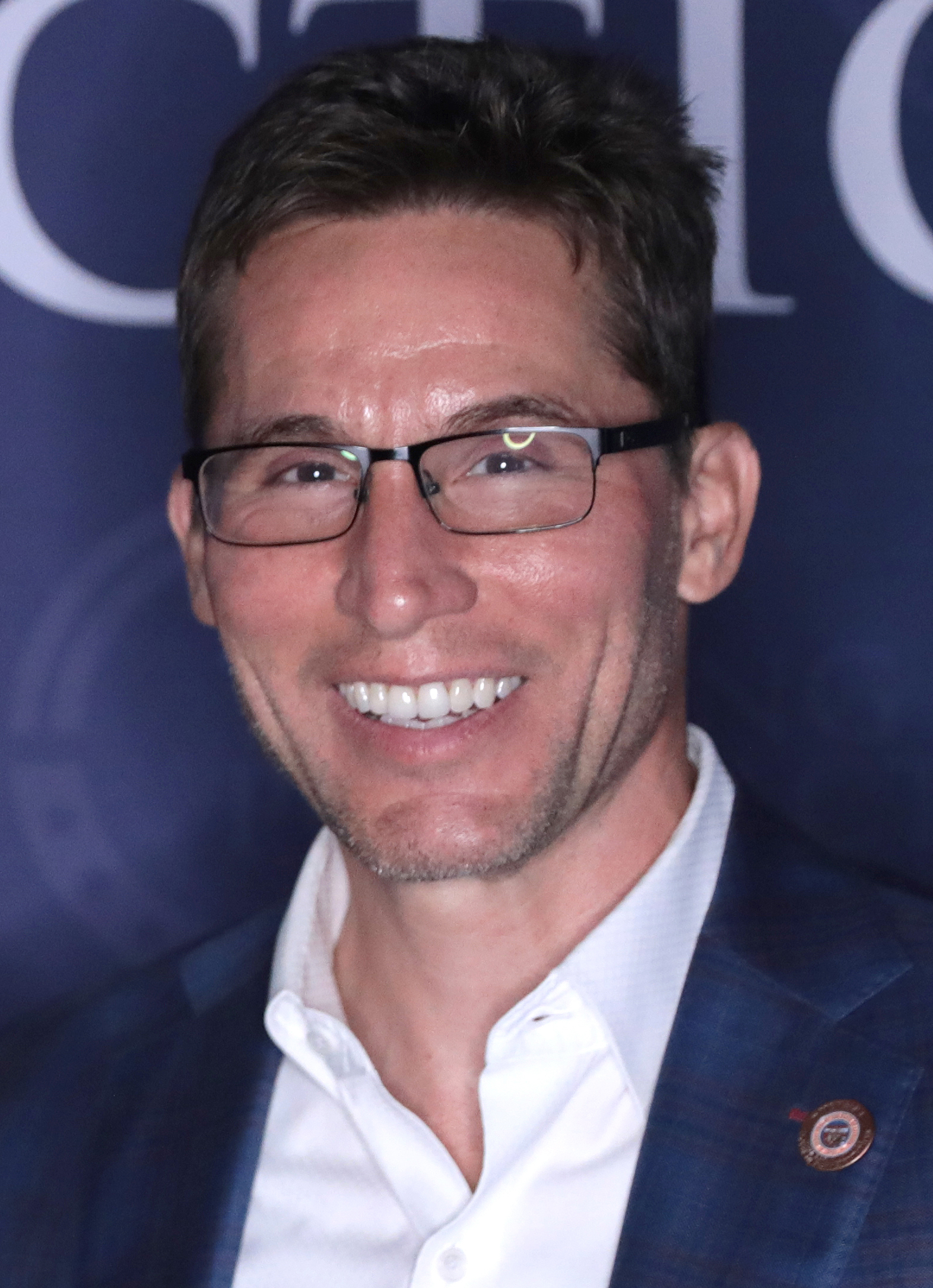

Member of the Arizona House of Representatives
- In office January 11, 2021 – March 2, 2026
- Preceded by: Jay Lawrence
- Succeeded by: Cody Reim
- Constituency: 23rd district (2021–2023); 3rd district (2023–2026)

Personal details
- Party: Republican
- Education: Bowling Green State University (attended)

Joseph Chaplik is an American Republican politician who served as a member of the Arizona House of Representatives from the 3rd legislative district. He was originally elected in 2020 to represent the 23rd district after defeating incumbent Republican Jay Lawrence in the primary election. Chaplik was a candidate in the Republican primary for Arizona's 1st congressional district in the 2026 election.

== Arizona state legislature ==
Chaplik and incumbent John Kavanagh won election to the Arizona House of Representatives in 2020, defeating Democratic candidate Eric Kurland in a two-seat general election by a margin of more than 15,000 votes.

Following redistricting, Chaplik was reelected in 2022 to represent the 3rd legislative district. During the 2023 legislative session, he was a candidate for Speaker of the House but was not elected. Chaplik was a founding member of the Arizona Freedom Caucus and served as its vice chairman.

During his tenure in the Arizona House of Representatives, Chaplik served as chairman of the Ethics Committee, vice chairman of the Appropriations Committee and the Commerce Committee, and as a member of the Health and Human Services and Transportation Committees.

In February 2026, Chaplik announced that he would resign from the Arizona state legislature to focus on his 2026 congressional campaign. After his resignation, Cody Reim was appointed to succeed him in LD3.

== U.S. House of Representatives ==
In December 2025, Chaplik announced his candidacy for the Republican nomination in Arizona's 1st congressional district in the 2026 election, seeking to succeed incumbent Republican David Schweikert, who was running for governor. Chaplik resigned from the Arizona House of Representatives in March 2026 to focus on his congressional campaign.

Chaplik faced former Arizona Cardinals kicker Jay Feely and technology executive John Trobough in the Republican primary. The primary was held on July 21, 2026. Feely won the Republican nomination with 49.8% of the vote, defeating Chaplik, who received 35.7%, and Trobough, who received 14.5%.

As a result, Chaplik did not advance to the general election. Feely subsequently became the Republican nominee for Arizona's 1st congressional district.
