= Cody Reim =

American politician

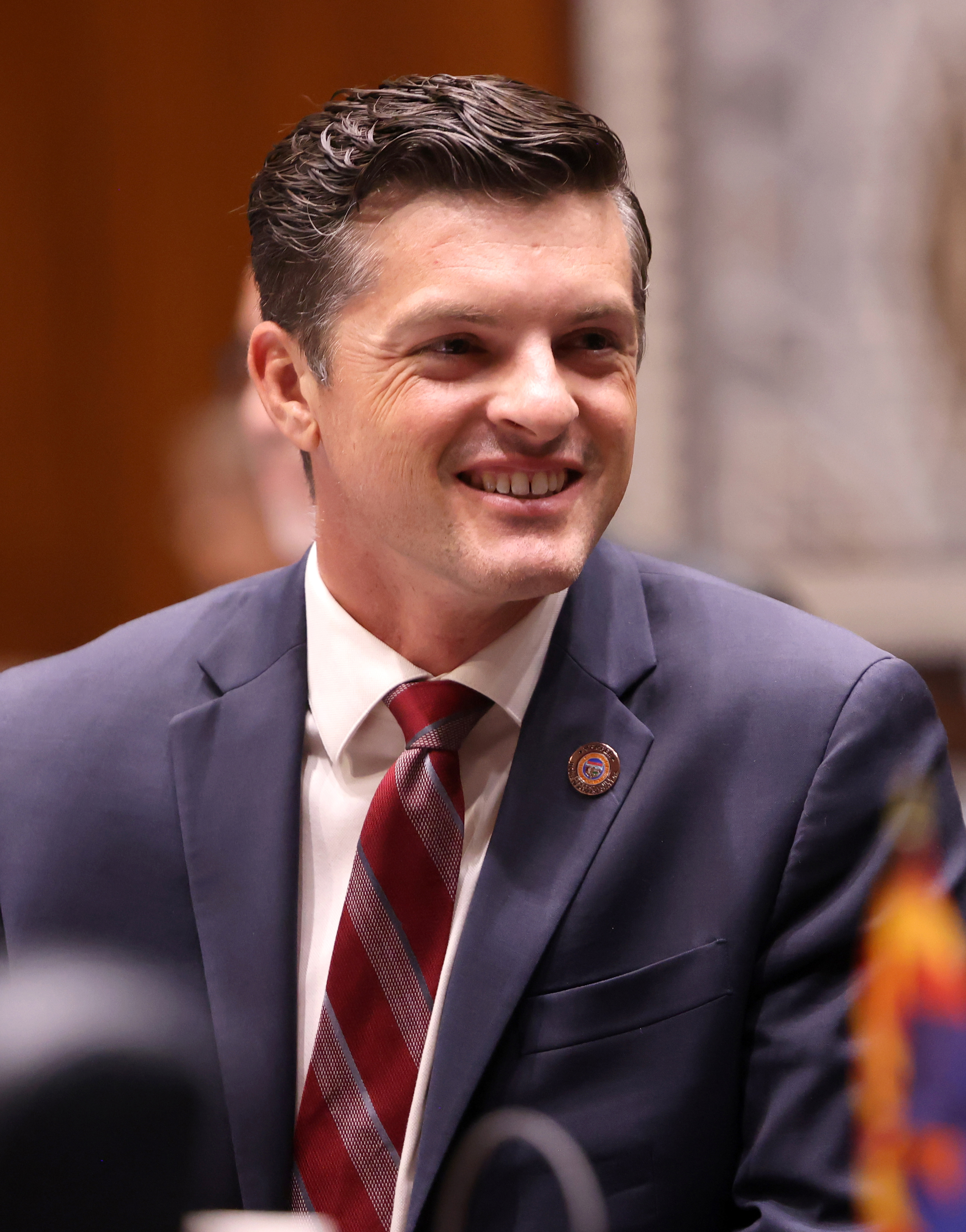

Member of the Arizona House of Representatives from the 3rd district
- Incumbent
- Assumed office March 18, 2026
- Preceded by: Joseph Chaplik

Personal details
- Party: Republican
- Profession: Small business owner

Cody Reim is an American politician who represents District 3 in the Arizona House of Representatives. He is a small business owner and was appointed by the Maricopa County Board of Supervisors to fill the vacancy left by Joseph Chaplik.
