= Arizona House of Representatives =

Lower house of the Arizona State Legislature

Coordinates: 33°26′53″N 112°5′45″W

- 57th Arizona Legislature

Type
- Type: Lower house
- Term limits: 4 terms (8 years)

History
- New session started: January 13, 2025

Leadership
- Speaker: Steve Montenegro (R) since January 13, 2025
- Speaker pro tempore: Neal Carter (R) since January 13, 2025
- Majority Leader: Michael Carbone (R) since January 13, 2025
- Minority Leader: Oscar De Los Santos (D) since January 13, 2025

Structure
- Seats: 60 representatives
- Political groups: Majority: Republican (33); Minority: Democratic (27)
- Length of term: 2 years
- Authority: Article 4, Arizona Constitution
- Salary: $24,000/year + per diem

Elections
- Last election: November 3, 2026 (60 seats)
- Next election: November 7, 2028 (60 seats)
- Redistricting: Arizona Independent Redistricting Commission

Meeting place
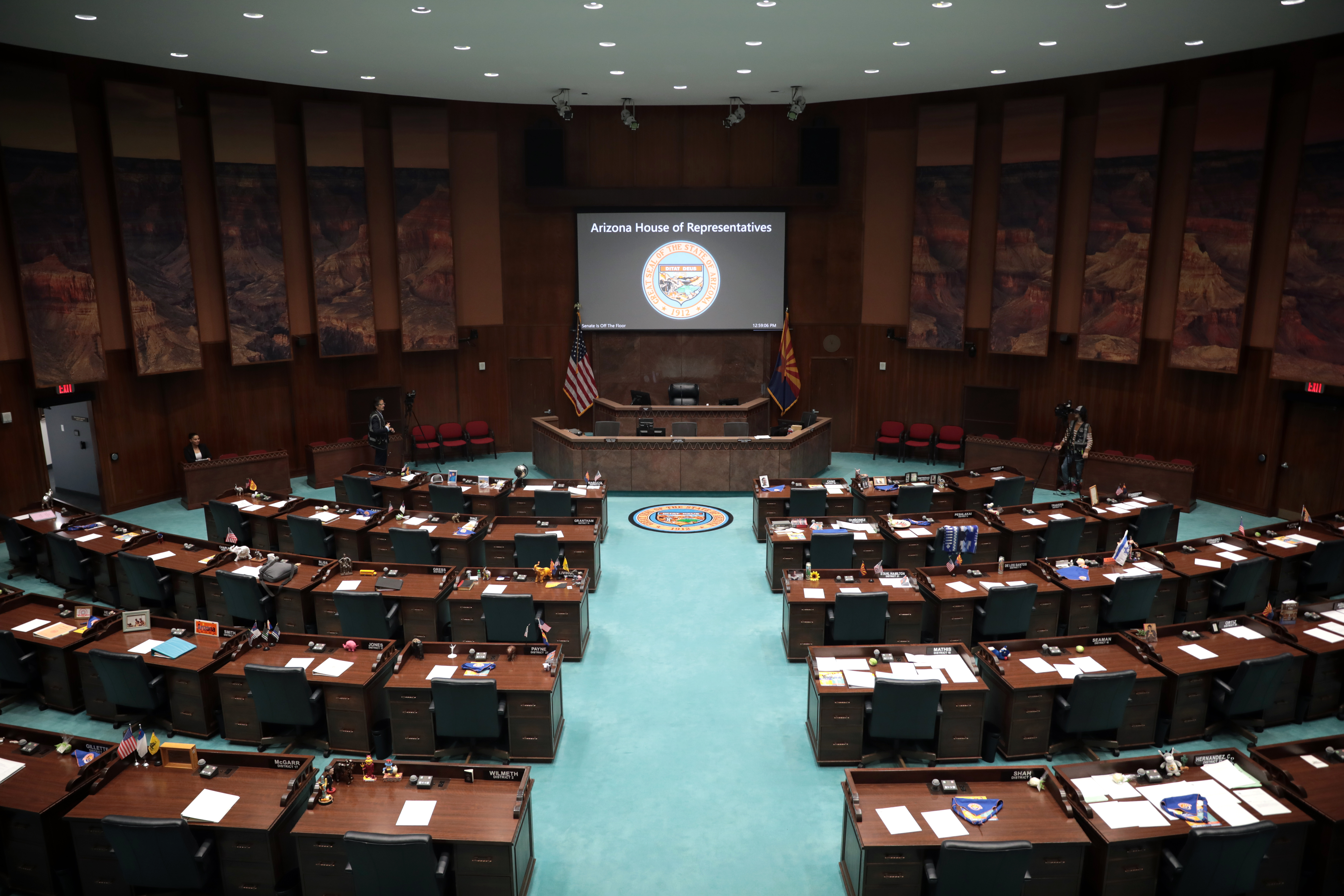
- House of Representatives Chamber; Arizona State Capitol; 1700 W. Washington St. Phoenix, Arizona • 85007

Website
- Arizona House of Representatives

Rules
- Rules of the Arizona House of Representatives

The Arizona House of Representatives is the lower house of the Arizona Legislature, the state legislature of the U.S. state of Arizona. The upper house is the Senate. The House convenes in the legislative chambers at the Arizona State Capitol in Phoenix. Its members are elected to two-year terms, with a term limit of four consecutive terms (eight years). Each of the state's 30 legislative districts elects two state house representatives and one state senator, with each district having a population of at least 203,000.

The last election occurred on November 3, 2026, with the Democratic Party securing a majority in the House.

== Leadership of the Arizona House of Representatives ==
The Speaker is elected by the majority party caucus along with the Majority Leader, the Assistant Majority Leader, and the Majority Whip. The House as a whole shall pass a House resolution confirming the Speaker and the Chief Clerk of the House. In addition to presiding over the body, the Speaker is also the chief leadership position, and controls the flow of legislation and committee assignments. Outside of legislative authority, the Speaker is given the power to employ, terminate and alter the compensation of all House employees. The Speaker has full final authority of all expenses charged to the House of Representatives, further, the Speaker is the individual responsible for approving House expense accounts. The minority party selects a Minority Leader, an Assistant Minority Leader and a Minority Whip in a closed caucus.

=== Leadership information ===
Position	Name	Party	Residence	District
Speaker	Steve Montenegro	Republican	Surprise	District 29
Speaker Pro Tempore	Neal Carter	Republican	San Tan Valley	District 15
Majority Leader	Michael Carbone	Republican	Buckeye	District 25
Majority Whip	Julie Willoughby	Republican	Chandler	District 13
Minority Leader	Oscar De Los Santos	Democratic	Phoenix	District 11
Assistant Minority Leader	Nancy Gutierrez	Democratic	Tucson	District 18
Minority Whip	Quantá Crews	Democratic	Phoenix	District 26
Minority Whip	Stacey Travers	Democratic	Phoenix	District 12

== Composition ==
↓
33	27
Republican	Democratic

Affiliation	Party (Shading indicates majority caucus)		Total	Vacant
Affiliation	Republican	Democratic	Total	Vacant
End 52nd, November 2016	36	24	60	0
Begin 53rd, January 2017	35	25	60	0
End 53rd, November 2018	35	25	60	0
Begin 54th, January 2019	31	29	60	0
Begin 55th, January 2021	31	29	60	0
Begin 56th, January 2023	31	29	60	0
Begin 57th, January 2025	33	27	60	0
March 8, 2026	32	27	59	1
March 18, 2026	33	27	60	0
April 20, 2026	32	27	59	1
April 29, 2026	33	27	60	0
Latest voting share	55%	45%		

== Membership, 2025–2027 ==
District	Name	Party	Residence	First Elected	Term Limited
1	Quang Nguyen	Rep	Prescott	2020	No
1	Selina Bliss	Rep	Prescott	2022	No
2	Justin Wilmeth	Rep	Phoenix	2020	No
2	Stephanie Simacek	Dem	Deer Valley	2024	No
3	Alexander Kolodin	Rep	Scottsdale	2022	No
3	Cody Reim	Rep	Rio Verde	2026 (Note: Originally appointed.)	No
4	Matt Gress	Rep	Phoenix	2022	No
4	Pamela Carter	Rep	Scottsdale	2024	No
5	Sarah Liguori	Dem	Phoenix	2024	No
5	Aaron Márquez	Dem	Phoenix	2024	No
6	Myron Tsosie	Dem	Chinle	2018	Yes
6	Mae Peshlakai	Dem	Cameron	2022	No
7	Walter Blackman	Rep	Snowflake	2024	No
7	Sylvia Allen	Rep	Snowflake	2026	No
8	Janeen Connolly	Dem	Tempe	2024	No
8	Brian Garcia	Dem	Tempe	2024	No
9	Lorena Austin	Dem	Mesa	2022	No
9	Seth Blattman	Dem	Mesa	2022	No
10	Justin Olson	Rep	Mesa	2024	No
10	Ralph Heap	Rep	Mesa	2024	No
11	Oscar De Los Santos	Dem	Phoenix	2022	No
11	Junelle Cavero	Dem	Phoenix	2024	No
12	Patty Contreras	Dem	Ahwatukee	2022	No
12	Stacey Travers	Dem	Phoenix	2022	No
13	Julie Willoughby	Rep	Chandler	2023	No
13	Jeff Weninger	Rep	Chandler	2024	No
14	Laurin Hendrix	Rep	Gilbert	2022	No
14	Khyl Powell	Rep	Gilbert	2024	No
15	Neal Carter	Rep	San Tan Valley	2021	No
15	Michael Way	Rep	Queen Creek	2024	No
16	Teresa Martinez	Rep	Casa Grande	2021	No
16	Chris Lopez	Rep	Casa Grande	2024	No
17	Rachel Keshel	Rep	Tucson	2022	No
17	Kevin Volk	Dem	Tucson	2024	No
18	Christopher Mathis	Dem	Tucson	2021	No
18	Nancy Gutierrez	Dem	Tucson	2022	No
19	Gail Griffin	Rep	Hereford	2018	Yes
19	Lupe Diaz	Rep	Benson	2021	No
20	Alma Hernandez	Dem	Tucson	2018	Yes
20	Betty Villegas	Dem	Tucson	2023	No
21	Consuelo Hernandez	Dem	Sunnyside	2022	No
21	Stephanie Stahl Hamilton	Dem	Tucson	2022	No
22	Lupe Contreras	Dem	Cashion	2022	No
22	Elda Luna-Nájera	Dem	Tolleson	2024	No
23	Mariana Sandoval	Dem	Goodyear	2022	No
23	Michele Peña	Rep	Yuma	2022	No
24	Lydia Hernandez	Dem	Phoenix	2022	No
24	Anna Abeytia	Dem	Maryvale	2024	No
25	Michael Carbone	Rep	Buckeye	2022	No
25	Nick Kupper	Rep	Phoenix	2024	No
26	Cesar Aguilar	Dem	Phoenix	2022	No
26	Quantá Crews	Dem	Phoenix	2023	No
27	Lisa Fink	Rep	Glendale	2024	No
27	Tony Rivero	Rep	Peoria	2024	No
28	David Livingston	Rep	Peoria	2022	No
28	Beverly Pingerelli	Rep	Glendale	2020	No
29	Steve Montenegro	Rep	Surprise	2022	No
29	James Taylor	Rep	Litchfield Park	2024	No
30	Leo Biasiucci	Rep	Lake Havasu City	2018	Yes
30	John Gillette	Rep	Kingman	2022	No

== Committees ==
The standing committees of the Arizona House of Representatives are:

Committee	Chair	Vice Chair
Appropriations	David Livingston	Matt Gress
Commerce	Jeff Weninger	Michael Way
Education	Matt Gress	James Taylor
Federalism, Military Affairs & Elections	John Gillette	Rachel Keshel
Government	Walter Blackman	Lisa Fink
Health & Human Services	Selina Bliss	Ralph Heap
International Trade	Tony Rivero	Michele Peña
Judiciary	Quang Nguyen	Khyl Powell
Land, Agriculture & Rural Affairs	Lupe Diaz	Michele Peña
Natural Resources, Energy & Water	Gail Griffin	Chris Lopez
Public Safety & Law Enforcement	David Marshall	Pamela Carter
Regulatory Affairs	Joseph Chaplik	Alexander Kolodin
Rules	Laurin Hendrix	Neal Carter
Science & Technology	Beverly Pingerelli	Justin Wilmeth
Transportation & Infrastructure	Leo Biasiucci	Teresa Martinez
Ways & Means	Justin Olson	Nick Kupper

== See also ==
- List of representatives and senators of Arizona Legislature by districts (2023–2033)
- List of Arizona state legislatures
- Arizona Legislature
- Arizona Senate
- Arizona State Capitol
- List of state and territorial capitols in the United States
