= 2022 Arizona Senate election =

- November 8, 2022

All 30 seats of the Arizona Senate 16 seats needed for a majority
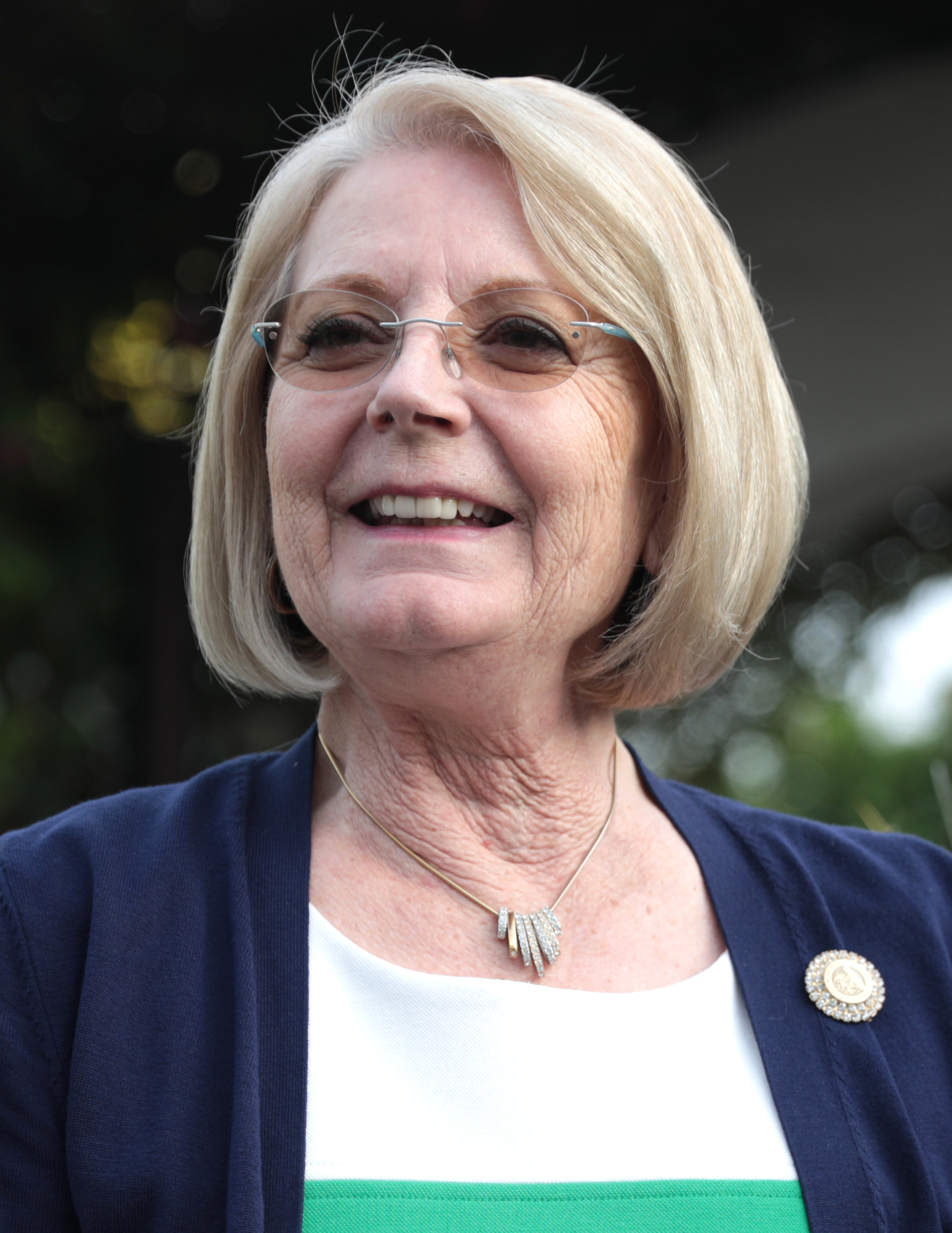

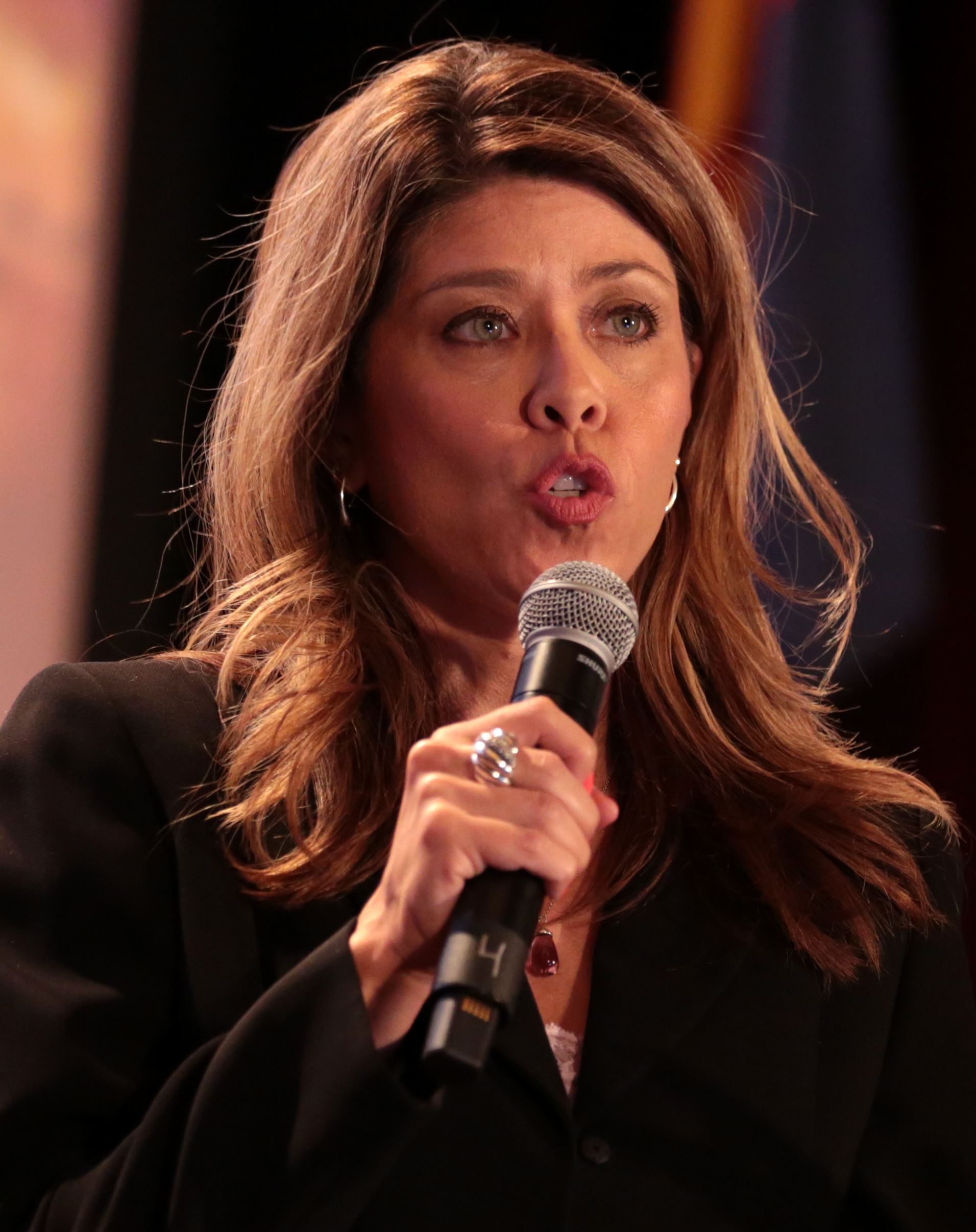
	Majority party	Minority party
Leader	Karen Fann (retired)	Rebecca Rios (retired)
Party	Republican	Democratic
Leader since	January 7, 2019	January 11, 2021
Leader's seat	1st - Prescott	11th (Note: Redistricted from the 27th district) - Phoenix
Seats before	16	14
Seats after	16	14
Seat change	Steady	Steady
Popular vote	1,258,896	1,045,625
Percentage	53.8%	44.7%
Swing	▲3.3%	▼4.8%
- Republican gain Republican hold Democratic hold Democratic gain 50–60% 60–70% 70–80% >90% 50–60% 60–70% 70–80% >90%
President of the Senate before election
Karen Fann
Republican
Elected President of the Senate
Warren Petersen
Republican

The 2022 Arizona Senate election was held on November 8, 2022. Voters elected members of the Arizona Senate in all 30 of the state's legislative districts to serve a two-year term. Primary elections were scheduled for August 2, 2022.

Prior to the elections, the Republican Party held a narrow majority over the Democratic Party, controlling 16 seats to their 14 seats. These were the first elections affected by redistricting resulting from the 2020 United States census.

== Predictions ==
Source	Ranking	As of
Sabato's Crystal Ball	Likely R	May 19, 2022

== Summary of results by Arizona State Legislative district ==
† - Incumbent not seeking re-election

District	Incumbent	Party	Elected Senator	Party
1st	Karen Fann†	Rep	Ken Bennett	Rep
2nd	Paul Boyer† (Note: Redistricted from the 20th district.)	Rep	Steve Kaiser	Rep
3rd	Michelle Ugenti-Rita† (Note: Redistricted from the 23rd district.)	Rep	John Kavanagh	Rep
4th	Christine Marsh (Note: Redistricted from the 28th district.)	Dem	Christine Marsh	Dem
4th	Nancy Barto (Note: Redistricted from the 15th district.)	Rep	Christine Marsh	Dem
5th	Lela Alston (Note: Redistricted from the 24th district.)	Dem	Lela Alston	Dem
6th	Theresa Hatathlie (Note: Redistricted from the 7th district.)	Dem	Theresa Hatathlie	Dem
7th	Wendy Rogers (Note: Redistricted from the 6th district.)	Rep	Wendy Rogers	Rep
7th	Kelly Townsend (Note: Redistricted from the 16th district.)	Rep	Wendy Rogers	Rep
8th	Juan Mendez (Note: Redistricted from the 26th district.)	Dem	Juan Mendez	Dem
9th	Tyler Pace (Note: Redistricted from the 25th district.)	Rep	Eva Burch	Dem
10th	New Seat		Dave Farnsworth	Rep
11th	Rebecca Rios† (Note: Redistricted from the 27th district.)	Dem	Catherine Miranda	Dem
12th	Sean Bowie† (Note: Redistricted from the 18th district.)	Dem	Mitzi Epstein	Dem
13th	J. D. Mesnard (Note: Redistricted from the 17th district.)	Rep	J. D. Mesnard	Rep
14th	Warren Petersen (Note: Redistricted from the 12th district.)	Rep	Warren Petersen	Rep
15th	New Seat		Jake Hoffman	Rep
16th	T. J. Shope (Note: Redistricted from the 8th district.)	Rep	T. J. Shope	Rep
17th	Vince Leach (Note: Redistricted from the 11th district.)	Rep	Justine Wadsack	Rep
18th	Victoria Steele† (Note: Redistricted from the 9th district.)	Dem	Priya Sundareshan	Dem
19th	David Gowan (Note: Redistricted from the 14th district.)	Rep	David Gowan	Rep
20th	Sally Ann Gonzales (Note: Redistricted from the 3rd district.)	Dem	Sally Ann Gonzales	Dem
21st	Rosanna Gabaldón (Note: Redistricted from the 2nd district.)	Dem	Rosanna Gabaldón	Dem
21st	Stephanie Stahl Hamilton† (Note: Redistricted from the 10th district.)	Dem	Rosanna Gabaldón	Dem
22nd	Lupe Contreras† (Note: Redistricted from the 19th district.)	Dem	Eva Diaz	Dem
23rd	Lisa Otondo† (Note: Redistricted from the 4th district.)	Dem	Brian Fernandez	Dem
24th	Martín Quezada† (Note: Redistricted from the 29th district.)	Dem	Anna Hernandez	Dem
25th	Sine Kerr (Note: Redistricted from the 13th district.)	Rep	Sine Kerr	Rep
26th	Raquel Terán (Note: Redistricted from the 30th district.)	Dem	Raquel Terán	Dem
27th	New Seat		Anthony Kern	Rep
28th	David Livingston† (Note: Redistricted from the 22nd district.)	Rep	Frank Carroll	Rep
28th	Rick Gray† (Note: Redistricted from the 21st district.)	Rep	Frank Carroll	Rep
29th	New Seat		Janae Shamp	Rep
30th	Sonny Borrelli (Note: Redistricted from the 5th district.)	Rep	Sonny Borrelli	Rep

== Overview ==
Party	Candidates	Votes		Seats		
Party	Candidates	No.	%	Before	After	+/–
Republican	25	1,258,896	53.81	16	16	Steady
Democratic	25	1,045,625	44.71	14	14	Steady
Independent	2	34,482	1.48	0	0	Steady
Total		2,338,503	100.00	30	30	

=== Closest races ===
Seats where the margin of victory was under 10%:

1. State Senate district 4, 0.96%
2. State Senate district 17, 2.48%
3. State Senate district 13, 3.46%
4. State Senate district 2, 3.68% (gain)
5. State Senate district 9, 4.94% (gain)
6. State Senate district 23, 7.32%

== Retiring incumbents ==
=== Republicans ===
- District 1: Karen Fann retired.
- District 2: Paul Boyer (Note: Redistricted from the 20th district) retired.
- District 3: Michelle Ugenti-Rita (Note: Redistricted from the 23rd district) retired to run for Secretary of State.
- District 28: David Livingston (Note: Redistricted from the 22nd district) was term-limited and ran for the State House.
- District 28: Rick Gray (Note: Redistricted from the 21st district) retired.

=== Democrats ===
- District 11: Rebecca Rios (Note: Redistricted from the 27th district) retired.
- District 12: Sean Bowie (Note: Redistricted from the 18th district) retired.
- District 18: Victoria Steele (Note: Redistricted from the 9th district) retired.
- District 21: Stephanie Stahl Hamilton (Note: Redistricted from the 10th district) ran for the State House.
- District 22: Lupe Contreras (Note: Redistricted from the 19th district) was term-limited and ran for the State House.
- District 23: Lisa Otondo (Note: Redistricted from the 4th district) retired.
- District 24: Martín Quezada (Note: Redistricted from the 29th district) was term-limited and ran for State Treasurer.

== Results ==
=== District 1 ===
==== Republican primary ====
Republican primary results
Party	Candidate	Votes	%
Republican	Ken Bennett	28,357	50.23
Republican	Steve Zipperman	28,101	49.77
Total votes		56,458	100%

==== General election ====
2022 Arizona's 1st Senate district election
Party	Candidate	Votes	%
Republican	Ken Bennett	82,234	67.25
Democratic	Mike Fogel	40,056	32.75
Total votes		122,290	100%
Republican hold			

=== District 2 ===
2022 Arizona's 2nd Senate district election
Party	Candidate	Votes	%
Republican	Steve Kaiser	41,623	51.84
Democratic	Jeanne Casteen	38,666	48.16
Total votes		80,289	100%
Republican hold			

=== District 3 ===
==== Republican primary ====
Republican primary results
Party	Candidate	Votes	%
Republican	John Kavanagh	27,391	51.46
Republican	Jan Dubauskas	25,839	48.54
Total votes		53,230	100%

==== General election ====
2022 Arizona's 3rd Senate district election
Party	Candidate	Votes	%
Republican	John Kavanagh	84,277	63.18
Democratic	Thomas Dugger	49,115	36.82
Total votes		133,392	100%
Republican hold			

=== District 4 ===
2022 Arizona's 4th Senate district election
Party	Candidate	Votes	%
Democratic	Christine Marsh (incumbent)	62,205	50.48
Republican	Nancy Barto (incumbent)	61,016	49.52
Total votes		123,221	100%
Democratic hold			

=== District 5 ===
==== Democratic primary ====
Democratic primary results
Party	Candidate	Votes	%
Democratic	Lela Alston (incumbent)	15,607	56.85
Democratic	Sarah Tyree	9,117	33.21
Democratic	Al Jones	2,728	9.94
Total votes		27,452	100%

==== General election ====
2022 Arizona's 5th Senate district election
Party	Candidate	Votes	%
Democratic	Lela Alston (incumbent)	56,142	70.75
Republican	Jeff Silvey	23,214	29.25
Total votes		79,356	100%
Democratic hold			

=== District 6 ===
2022 Arizona's 6th Senate district election
Party	Candidate	Votes	%
Democratic	Theresa Hatathlie (incumbent)	58,829	100%
Total votes		58,829	100%
Democratic hold			

=== District 7 ===
==== Republican primary ====
Republican primary results
Party	Candidate	Votes	%
Republican	Wendy Rogers (incumbent)	24,023	59.75
Republican	Kelly Townsend (incumbent)	16,185	40.25
Total votes		40,208	100%

==== General election ====
2022 Arizona's 7th Senate district election
Party	Candidate	Votes	%
Republican	Wendy Rogers (incumbent)	63,019	63.62
Democratic	Kyle Nitschke	36,030	36.38
Total votes		99,049	100%
Republican hold			

=== District 8 ===
2022 Arizona's 8th Senate district election
Party	Candidate	Votes	%
Democratic	Juan Mendez (incumbent)	42,669	62.72
Republican	Roxana Holzapfel	25,366	37.28
Total votes		68,035	100%
Democratic hold			

=== District 9 ===
==== Republican primary ====
Republican primary results
Party	Candidate	Votes	%
Republican	Robert Scantlebury	12,308	66.93
Republican	Tyler Pace (incumbent)	6,081	33.07
Total votes		18,389	100%

==== General election ====
2022 Arizona's 9th Senate district election
Party	Candidate	Votes	%
Democratic	Eva Burch	32,808	52.47
Republican	Robert Scantlebury	29,715	47.53
Total votes		62,523	100%
Democratic gain from Republican			

=== District 10 ===
==== Republican primary ====
Republican primary results
Party	Candidate	Votes	%
Republican	Dave Farnsworth	23,494	64.9
Republican	Russell Bowers	12,705	35.1
Total votes		36,199	100%

==== General election ====
2022 Arizona's 10th Senate district election
Party	Candidate	Votes	%
Republican	Dave Farnsworth	53,945	61.07
Independent	Nick Fierro	34,382	38.93
Total votes		88,327	100%
Republican win (new seat)			

=== District 11 ===
==== Democratic primary ====
Democratic primary results
Party	Candidate	Votes	%
Democratic	Catherine Miranda	8,171	46.85
Democratic	Junelle Cavero	4,729	27.12
Democratic	Janelle Wood	4,540	26.03
Total votes		17,440	100%

==== General election ====
2022 Arizona's 11th Senate district election
Party	Candidate	Votes	%
Democratic	Catherine Miranda	37,265	75.20
Republican	Maryn Brannies	12,290	24.80
Total votes		49,555	100%
Democratic hold			

=== District 12 ===
==== Republican primary ====
Republican primary results
Party	Candidate	Votes	%
Republican	David Richardson	12,248	50.35
Republican	Suzanne Sharer	12,078	49.65
Total votes		24,326	100%

==== General election ====
2022 Arizona's 12th Senate district election
Party	Candidate	Votes	%
Democratic	Mitzi Epstein	58,349	58.14
Republican	David Richardson	42,008	41.86
Total votes		100,357	100%
Democratic hold			

=== District 13 ===
==== Democratic primary ====
Democratic primary results
Party	Candidate	Votes	%
Democratic	Cindy Hans	12,075	63.88
Democratic	Michael Morris	6,828	36.12
Total votes		18,903	100%

==== General election ====
2022 Arizona's 13th Senate district election
Party	Candidate	Votes	%
Republican	J. D. Mesnard (incumbent)	48,590	51.73
Democratic	Cindy Hans	45,340	48.27
Total votes		93,930	100%
Republican hold			

=== District 14 ===
2022 Arizona's 14th Senate district election
Party	Candidate	Votes	%
Republican	Warren Petersen (incumbent)	64,591	100%
Total votes		64,591	100%
Republican hold			

=== District 15 ===
2022 Arizona's 15th Senate district election
Party	Candidate	Votes	%
Republican	Jake Hoffman	60,850	64.75
Democratic	Alan Smith	33,120	35.25
Total votes		93,970	100%
Republican win (new seat)			

=== District 16 ===
2022 Arizona's 16th Senate district election
Party	Candidate	Votes	%
Republican	T. J. Shope (incumbent)	41,057	55.71
Democratic	Taylor Kerby	32,636	44.29
Total votes		73,693	100%
Republican hold			

=== District 17 ===
==== Republican primary ====
Republican primary results
Party	Candidate	Votes	%
Republican	Justine Wadsack	16,329	40.93
Republican	Vince Leach (incumbent)	14,161	35.49
Republican	Robert Barr	9,407	23.58
Total votes		39,897	100%

==== General election ====
2022 Arizona's 17th Senate district election
Party	Candidate	Votes	%
Republican	Justine Wadsack	63,501	51.24
Democratic	Mike Nickerson	60,420	48.76
Total votes		123,921	100%
Republican hold			

=== District 18 ===
==== Democratic primary ====
Democratic primary results
Party	Candidate	Votes	%
Democratic	Priya Sundareshan	20,751	55.8
Democratic	Morgan Abraham	16,439	44.2
Total votes		37,190	100%

==== General election ====
2022 Arizona's 18th Senate district election
Party	Candidate	Votes	%
Democratic	Priya Sundareshan	67,343	62.22
Republican	Stan Caine	40,896	37.78
Total votes		108,239	100%
Democratic hold			

=== District 19 ===
2022 Arizona's 19th Senate district election
Party	Candidate	Votes	%
Republican	David Gowan (incumbent)	67,200	100%
Total votes		67,200	100%
Republican hold			

=== District 20 ===
2022 Arizona's 20th Senate district election
Party	Candidate	Votes	%
Democratic	Sally Ann Gonzales (incumbent)	49,966	100%
Total votes		49,966	100%
Democratic hold			

=== District 21 ===
2022 Arizona's 21st Senate district election
Party	Candidate	Votes	%
Democratic	Rosanna Gabaldón (incumbent)	40,312	64.07
Republican	Jim Cleveland	22,604	35.93
Total votes		62,916	100%
Democratic hold			

=== District 22 ===
==== Democratic primary ====
Democratic primary results
Party	Candidate	Votes	%
Democratic	Diego Espinoza (disqualified)	6,224	52.64
Democratic	Richard Andrade	5,600	47.36
Total votes		11,824	100%

==== General election ====
2022 Arizona's 22nd Senate district election (write-in)
Party	Candidate	Votes	%
Democratic	Eva Diaz	6,629	58.97
Republican	Steven Robinson	3,722	33.11
Democratic	Steven Chapman	545	4.85
Write-in	Other write-ins	345	3.07
Total votes		11,241	100%
Democratic hold			

=== District 23 ===
2022 Arizona's 23rd Senate district election
Party	Candidate	Votes	%
Democratic	Brian Fernandez	29,175	53.66
Republican	Gary Garcia Snyder	25,194	46.34
Total votes		54,369	100%
Democratic hold			

=== District 24 ===
==== Democratic primary ====
Democratic primary results
Party	Candidate	Votes	%
Democratic	Anna Hernandez	6,277	57.18
Democratic	Cesar Chavez	4,700	42.82
Total votes		10,977	100%

==== General election ====
2022 Arizona's 24th Senate district election
Party	Candidate	Votes	%
Democratic	Anna Hernandez	25,984	100%
Total votes		25,984	100%
Democratic hold			

=== District 25 ===
2022 Arizona's 25th Senate district election
Party	Candidate	Votes	%
Republican	Sine Kerr (incumbent)	59,471	100%
Total votes		59,471	100%
Republican hold			

=== District 26 ===
2022 Arizona's 26th Senate district election
Party	Candidate	Votes	%
Democratic	Raquel Terán (incumbent)	25,583	100%
Total votes		25,583	100%
Democratic hold			

=== District 27 ===
==== Republican primary ====
Republican primary results
Party	Candidate	Votes	%
Republican	Anthony Kern	17,335	67.63
Republican	Jamie Kelly	8,297	32.37
Total votes		25,632	100%

==== General election ====
2022 Arizona's 27th Senate district election
Party	Candidate	Votes	%
Republican	Anthony Kern	43,719	55.14
Democratic	Brittani Barraza	35,574	44.86
Total votes		79,293	100%
Republican win (new seat)			

=== District 28 ===
==== Republican primary ====
Republican primary results
Party	Candidate	Votes	%
Republican	Frank Carroll	32,495	71.35
Republican	Clair Van Steenwyk	13,045	28.65
Total votes		45,540	100%

==== General election ====
2022 Arizona's 28th Senate district election
Party	Candidate	Votes	%
Republican	Frank Carroll	72,873	61.83
Democratic	David Sandoval	44,982	38.17
Total votes		117,855	100%
Republican hold			

=== District 29 ===
==== Republican primary ====
Republican primary results
Party	Candidate	Votes	%
Republican	Janae Shamp	16,156	53.29
Republican	Joanne Osborne	9,507	31.36
Republican	Ryan Eldridge	4,655	15.35
Total votes		30,318	100%

==== General election ====
2022 Arizona's 29th Senate district election
Party	Candidate	Votes	%
Republican	Janae Shamp	51,466	58.97
Democratic	David Raymer	35,812	41.03
Total votes		87,278	100%
Republican win (new seat)			

=== District 30 ===
2022 Arizona's 30th Senate district election
Party	Candidate	Votes	%
Republican	Sonny Borrelli (incumbent)	73,780	100%
Total votes		73,780	100%
Republican hold			
