= 2022 Arizona House of Representatives election =

2022 Arizona House of Representatives elections
- November 8, 2022

All 60 seats in the Arizona House of Representatives 31 seats needed for a majority
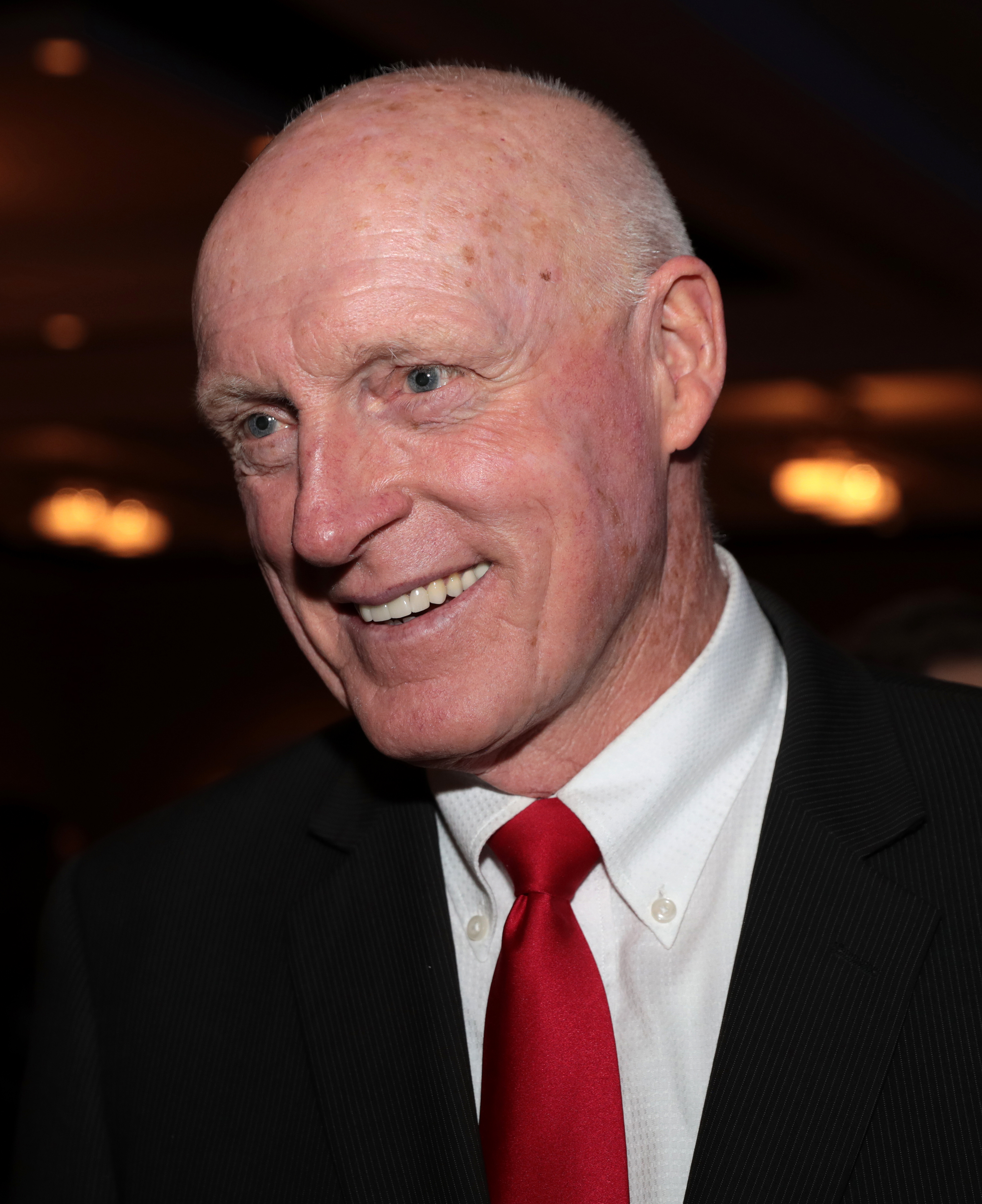

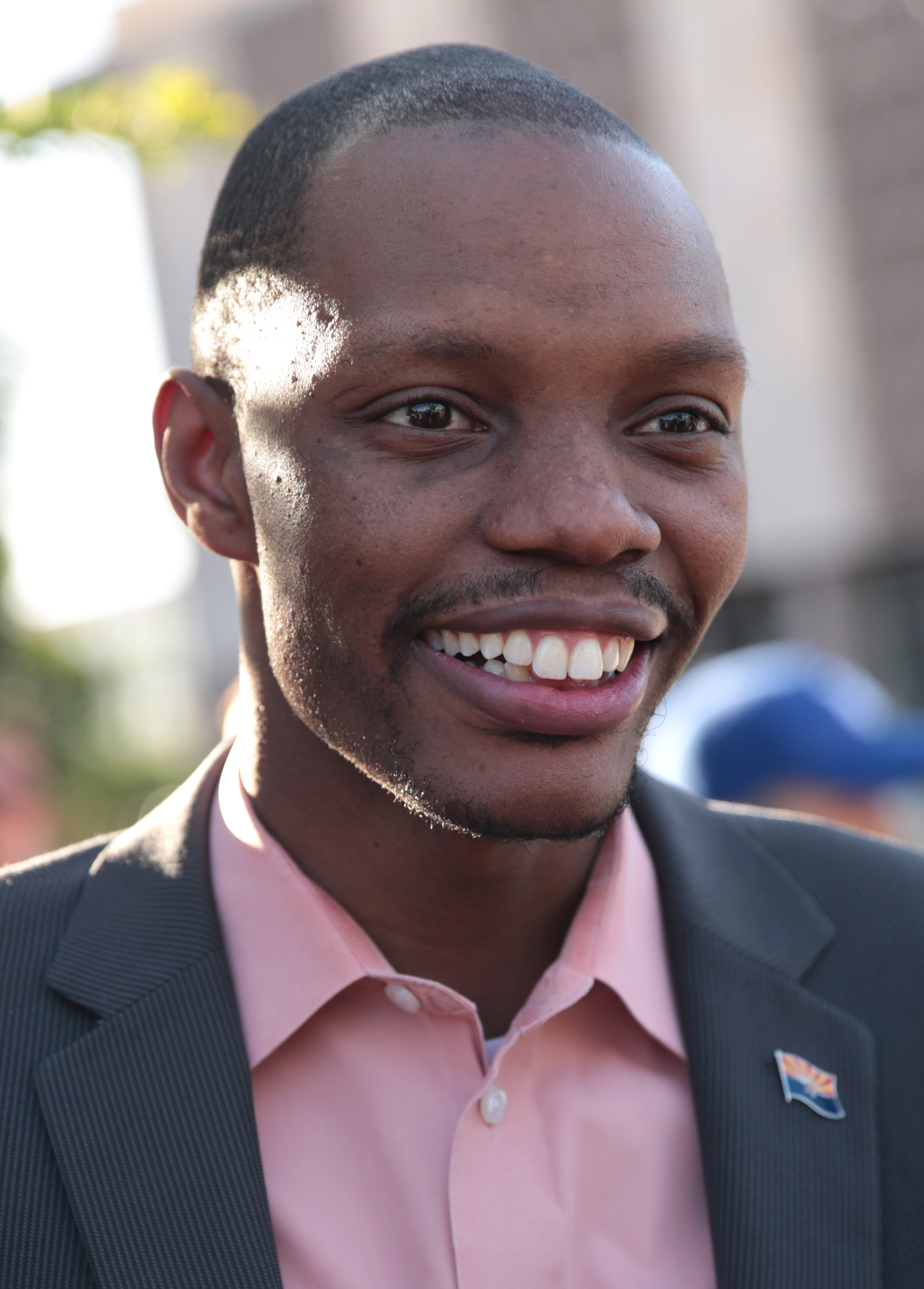
	Majority party	Minority party
Leader	Russell Bowers (term-limited)	Reginald Bolding (term-limited)
Party	Republican	Democratic
Leader since	January 14, 2019	January 11, 2021
Leader's seat	10th (Note: Redistricted from the 25th district.) - Mesa	11th (Note: Redistricted from the 27th district.) - Phoenix
Last election	31 seats, 54.63%	29 seats, 45.37%
Seats before	31	29
Seats won	31	29
Seat change	Steady	Steady
Popular vote	2,146,365	1,544,785
Percentage	58.15%	41.85%
Swing	▲3.52%	▼3.52%
- Results: Democratic hold Democratic gain Republican hold Republican gain
Speaker before election
Russell Bowers
Republican
Elected Speaker
Ben Toma
Republican

The 2022 Arizona House of Representatives elections were held November 8, 2022. Voters in each of Arizona's 30 legislative districts elected two state representatives to the Arizona House of Representatives. The elections coincided with the elections for other offices, including the U.S Senate, U.S. House of Representatives, and state senate. The primary elections were set for August 2022.

== Predictions ==
Source	Ranking	As of
Sabato's Crystal Ball	Likely R	May 19, 2022

== Summary of results by Arizona State legislative district ==
† - Incumbent not seeking re-election

District	Incumbent	Party	Elected Representative	Party
1st	Quang Nguyen	Rep	Quang Nguyen	Rep
1st	Judy Burges (Note: Lost re-nomination in party's primary election.)	Rep	Selina Bliss	Rep
2nd	Judy Schwiebert (Note: Redistricted from the 20th district.)	Dem	Judy Schwiebert	Dem
2nd	Shawnna Bolick†	Rep	Judy Schwiebert	Dem
2nd	Justin Wilmeth (Note: Redistricted from the 15th district.)	Rep	Justin Wilmeth	Rep
2nd	Steve Kaiser†	Rep	Justin Wilmeth	Rep
3rd	Joseph Chaplik (Note: Redistricted from the 23rd district.)	Rep	Joseph Chaplik	Rep
3rd	John Kavanagh†	Rep	Alexander Kolodin	Rep
4th	New Seat		Matt Gress	Rep
4th	Kelli Butler† (Note: Redistricted from the 28th district.)	Dem	Laura Terech	Dem
5th	Amish Shah (Note: Redistricted from the 24th district.)	Dem	Amish Shah	Dem
5th	Jennifer Longdon	Dem	Jennifer Longdon	Dem
5th	Sarah Liguori	Dem	Jennifer Longdon	Dem
6th	Jasmine Blackwater-Nygren† (Note: Redistricted from the 7th district.)	Dem	Mae Peshlakai	Dem
6th	Myron Tsosie	Dem	Myron Tsosie	Dem
7th	David Cook (Note: Redistricted from the 8th district.)	Rep	David Cook	Rep
7th	John Fillmore (Note: Redistricted from the 16th district.)	Rep	David Cook	Rep
7th	Walter Blackman† (Note: Redistricted from the 6th district.)	Rep	David Marshall	Rep
7th	Brenda Barton†	Rep	David Marshall	Rep
8th	Melody Hernandez (Note: Redistricted from the 26th district.)	Dem	Melody Hernandez	Dem
8th	Athena Salman	Dem	Athena Salman	Dem
9th	New Seat		Lorena Austin	Dem
9th	New Seat		Seth Blattman	Dem
10th	Michelle Udall† (Note: Redistricted from the 25th district.)	Rep	Justin Heap	Rep
10th	Russell Bowers†	Rep	Barbara Parker	Rep
11th	Reginald Bolding† (Note: Redistricted from the 27th district.)	Dem	Oscar De Los Santos	Dem
11th	Marcelino Quiñonez	Dem	Marcelino Quiñonez	Dem
12th	Jennifer Jermaine† (Note: Redistricted from the 18th district.)	Dem	Patty Contreras	Dem
12th	Mitzi Epstein†	Dem	Stacey Travers	Dem
13th	Jennifer Pawlik (Note: Redistricted from the 17th district.)	Dem	Jennifer Pawlik	Dem
13th	Jeff Weninger†	Rep	Liz Harris	Rep
14th	Travis Grantham (Note: Redistricted from the 12th district.)	Rep	Travis Grantham	Rep
14th	New Seat		Laurin Hendrix	Rep
15th	Jacqueline Parker	Rep	Jacqueline Parker	Rep
15th	Neal Carter	Rep	Neal Carter	Rep
15th	Jake Hoffman†	Rep	Neal Carter	Rep
16th	Teresa Martinez (Note: Redistricted from the 11th district.)	Rep	Teresa Martinez	Rep
16th	New Seat		Keith Seaman	Dem
17th	New Seat		Rachel Jones	Rep
17th	Mark Finchem†	Rep	Cory McGarr	Rep
18th	Domingo DeGrazia (Note: Redistricted from the 10th district.)	Dem	Nancy Gutierrez	Dem
18th	Morgan Abraham†	Dem	Nancy Gutierrez	Dem
18th	Christopher Mathis (Note: Redistricted from the 9th district.)	Dem	Christopher Mathis	Dem
18th	Pamela Hannley†	Dem	Christopher Mathis	Dem
19th	Gail Griffin (Note: Redistricted from the 14th district.)	Rep	Gail Griffin	Rep
19th	Lupe Diaz	Rep	Lupe Diaz	Rep
20th	Andrés Cano (Note: Redistricted from the 3rd district.)	Dem	Andrés Cano	Dem
20th	Alma Hernandez	Dem	Alma Hernandez	Dem
21st	Daniel Hernández Jr.† (Note: Redistricted from the 2nd district.)	Dem	Consuelo Hernandez	Dem
21st	Andrea Dalessandro†	Dem	Stephanie Stahl Hamilton	Dem
22nd	Devin Del Palacio† (Note: Diego Espinoza resigned from office on September 5, 2022. He was replaced when the Maricopa County Board of Supervisors appointed Devin Del Palacio as Espinoza's successor.) (Note: Redistricted from the 19th district.)	Dem	Lupe Contreras	Dem
22nd	Lorenzo Sierra	Dem	Lupe Contreras	Dem
22nd	Richard Andrade† (Note: Redistricted from the 29th district.)	Dem	Leezah Sun	Dem
23rd	Brian Fernandez† (Note: Redistricted from the 4th district.)	Dem	Mariana Sandoval	Dem
23rd	New Seat		Michele Pena	Rep
24th	Cesar Chavez†	Dem	Analise Ortiz	Dem
24th	New Seat		Lydia Hernandez	Dem
25th	Tim Dunn (Note: Redistricted from the 13th district.)	Rep	Tim Dunn	Rep
25th	Joel John	Rep	Michael Carbone	Rep
26th	Robert Meza† (Note: Redistricted from the 30th district.)	Dem	Cesar Aguilar	Dem
26th	Christian Solorio	Dem	Flavio Bravo	Dem
27th	Ben Toma (Note: Redistricted from the 22nd district.)	Rep	Ben Toma	Rep
27th	Kevin Payne (Note: Redistricted from the 21st district.)	Rep	Kevin Payne	Rep
28th	Beverly Pingerelli	Rep	Beverly Pingerelli	Rep
28th	Frank Carroll†	Rep	David Livingston	Rep
29th	New Seat		Steve Montenegro	Rep
29th	Joanne Osborne†	Rep	Austin Smith	Rep
30th	Leo Biasiucci (Note: Redistricted from the 5th district.)	Rep	Leo Biasiucci	Rep
30th	Regina Cobb†	Rep	John Gillette	Rep

== Retirements ==
- District 2: Shawnna Bolick (R) was retiring to run for Secretary of State.
- District 2: Steve Kaiser (R) was retiring to run for the State Senate.
- District 3: John Kavanagh (Note: Redistricted from district 23 to 3.) (R) was retiring to run for State Senate.
- District 4: Kelli Butler (D) was retiring.
- District 6: Jasmine Blackwater-Nygren (D) was retiring.
- District 7: Walter Blackman (R) was retiring to run for the U.S. House of Representatives in Arizona's 2nd congressional district in the 2022 election.
- District 10: Michelle Udall (R) was retiring to run for Superintendent of Public Instruction.
- District 10: Russell Bowers (R) was retiring to run for State Senate.
- District 11: Reginald Bolding (D) was retiring to run for Secretary of State.
- District 12: Jennifer Jermaine (D) was retiring.
- District 12: Mitzi Epstein (D) was retiring to run for State Senate.
- District 13: Jeff Weninger (R) was retiring to run for State Treasurer.
- District 15: Jake Hoffman (R) was retiring to run for State Senate.
- District 17: Mark Finchem (R) was retiring to run for Secretary of State.
- District 18: Morgan Abraham (D) was retiring to run for State Senate.
- District 18: Pamela Hannley (D) was retiring.
- District 21: Daniel Hernández Jr. (D) was retiring to run for the U.S. House of Representatives in Arizona's 6th congressional district in the 2022 election.
- District 22: Diego Espinoza (D) was retiring to run for State Senate.
- District 22: Richard Andrade (D) was retiring to run for State Senate.
- District 23: Brian Fernandez (D) was retiring to run for State Senate.
- District 24: Cesar Chavez (D) was retiring to run for State Senate.
- District 26: Robert Meza (D) was retiring.
- District 28: Frank Carroll (R) was retiring to run for State Senate.
- District 29: Joanne Osborne (R) was retiring to run for State Senate.
- District 30: Regina Cobb (R) was retiring.

== Detailed results ==
The first-place (left) and the second-place (right) candidates' results in Phoenix

=== District 1 ===
2022 Arizona House of Representatives election, 1st district
Party	Candidate	Votes	%
Republican	Quang Nguyen (incumbent)	75,106	33.18
Republican	Selina Bliss	74,731	33.01
Democratic	Cathy Ransom	39,665	17.52
Democratic	Neil Sinclair	36,867	16.29
Total votes		226,369	100%
Republican hold			
Republican hold			

=== District 2 ===
2022 Arizona House of Representatives election, 2nd district
Party	Candidate	Votes	%
Democratic	Judy Schwiebert (incumbent)	40,130	35.17
Republican	Justin Wilmeth (incumbent)	37,977	33.29
Republican	Christian Lamar	35,987	31.54
Total votes		114,094	100%
Democratic hold			
Republican hold			

=== District 3 ===
2022 Arizona House of Representatives election, 3rd district
Party	Candidate	Votes	%
Republican	Joseph Chaplik (incumbent)	78,390	51.70
Republican	Alexander Kolodin	72,165	47.59
Total votes		150,555	100%
Republican hold			
Republican hold			

=== District 4 ===
2022 Arizona House of Representatives election, 4th district
Party	Candidate	Votes	%
Republican	Matt Gress	61,527	34.72
Democratic	Laura Terech	59,292	33.46
Republican	Maria Syms	56,383	31.82
Total votes		177,202	100%
Republican win (new seat)			
Democratic hold			

=== District 5 ===
2022 Arizona House of Representatives election, 5th district
Party	Candidate	Votes	%
Democratic	Amish Shah (incumbent)	49,006	40.27
Democratic	Jennifer Longdon (incumbent)	48,436	39.80
Republican	Jennifer Treadwell	24,262	19.94
Total votes		121,704	100%
Democratic hold			
Democratic hold			

=== District 6 ===
2022 Arizona House of Representatives election, 6th district
Party	Candidate	Votes	%
Democratic	Mae Peshlakai	46,020	50.91
Democratic	Myron Tsosie (incumbent)	44,378	49.09
Total votes		90,398	100%
Democratic hold			
Democratic hold			

=== District 7 ===
2022 Arizona House of Representatives election, 7th district
Party	Candidate	Votes	%
Republican	David Cook	59,974	52.58
Republican	David Marshall	52,893	46.37
Total votes		112,867	100%
Republican hold			
Republican hold			

=== District 8 ===
2022 Arizona House of Representatives election, 8th district
Party	Candidate	Votes	%
Democratic	Melody Hernandez (incumbent)	40,378	31.71
Democratic	Athena Salman (incumbent)	39,386	30.93
Republican	Caden Darrow	23,848	18.73
Republican	Bill Loughrige	23,725	18.63
Total votes		127,337	100%
Democratic hold			
Democratic hold			

=== District 9 ===
2022 Arizona House of Representatives election, 9th district
Party	Candidate	Votes	%
Democratic	Lorena Austin	30,980	26.52
Democratic	Seth Blattman	29,403	25.17
Republican	Kathy Pearce	28,643	24.52
Republican	Mary Ann Mendoza	27,791	23.79
Total votes		116,817	100%
Democratic win (new seat)			
Democratic win (new seat)			

=== District 10 ===
2022 Arizona House of Representatives election, 10th district
Party	Candidate	Votes	%
Republican	Justin Heap	50,024	36.95
Republican	Barbara Parker	49,190	33.33
Democratic	Helen Hunter	36,182	26.72
Total votes		135,396	100%
Republican hold			
Republican hold			

=== District 11 ===
2022 Arizona House of Representatives election, 11th district
Party	Candidate	Votes	%
Democratic	Oscar De Los Santos	30,524	41.09
Democratic	Marcelino Quiñonez (incumbent)	30,009	40.40
Republican	Tatiana Peña	13,744	18.50
Total votes		74,277	100%
Democratic hold			
Democratic hold			

=== District 12 ===
2022 Arizona House of Representatives election, 12th district
Party	Candidate	Votes	%
Democratic	Patty Contreras	55,454	29.30
Democratic	Stacey Travers	54,484	28.79
Republican	Terry Roe	40,024	21.15
Republican	James Chaston	39,298	20.76
Total votes		189,260	100%
Democratic hold			
Democratic hold			

=== District 13 ===
2022 Arizona House of Representatives election, 13th district, recount
Party	Candidate	Votes	%
Democratic	Jennifer Pawlik (incumbent)	47,164	35.05
Republican	Liz Harris	43,830	32.58
Republican	Julie Willoughby	43,555	32.37
Total votes		134,549	100%
Democratic hold			
Republican hold			

=== District 14 ===
2022 Arizona House of Representatives election, 14th district
Party	Candidate	Votes	%
Republican	Travis Grantham (incumbent)	52,827	36.36
Republican	Laurin Hendrix	52,112	35.87
Democratic	Brandy Resse	40,349	27.77
Total votes		145,288	100%
Republican hold			
Republican win (new seat)			

=== District 15 ===
2022 Arizona House of Representatives election, 15th district
Party	Candidate	Votes	%
Republican	Jacqueline Parker (incumbent)	58,260	51.95
Republican	Neal Carter (incumbent)	53,883	48.05
Total votes		112,143	100%
Republican hold			
Republican hold			

=== District 16 ===
2022 Arizona House of Representatives election, 16th district
Party	Candidate	Votes	%
Republican	Teresa Martinez (incumbent)	37,308	36.46
Democratic	Keith Seaman	32,831	32.08
Republican	Rob Hudelson	32,187	31.46
Total votes		102,326	100%
Republican hold			
Democratic win (new seat)			

=== District 17 ===
2022 Arizona House of Representatives election, 17th district
Party	Candidate	Votes	%
Republican	Rachel Jones	60,541	26.16
Republican	Cory McGarr	59,385	25.66
Democratic	Dana Allmond	57,503	24.85
Democratic	Brian Radford	54,013	23.34
Total votes		231,442	100%
Republican win (new seat)			
Republican hold			

=== District 18 ===
2022 Arizona House of Representatives election, 18th district
Party	Candidate	Votes	%
Democratic	Nancy Gutierrez	61,960	38.19
Democratic	Christopher Mathis (incumbent)	59,063	36.40
Republican	Linda Evans	41,217	25.40
Total votes		162,240	100%
Democratic hold			
Democratic hold			

=== District 19 ===
2022 Arizona House of Representatives election, 19th district
Party	Candidate	Votes	%
Republican	Gail Griffin (incumbent)	53,891	38.58
Republican	Lupe Diaz (incumbent)	49,561	35.48
Democratic	Sanda Clark	36,242	25.94
Total votes		139,694	100%
Republican hold			
Republican hold			

=== District 20 ===
2022 Arizona House of Representatives election, 20th district
Party	Candidate	Votes	%
Democratic	Andrés Cano (incumbent)	40,581	51.25
Democratic	Alma Hernandez (incumbent)	38,600	48.75
Total votes		79,181	100%
Democratic hold			
Democratic hold			

=== District 21 ===
2022 Arizona House of Representatives election, 21st district
Party	Candidate	Votes	%
Democratic	Consuelo Hernandez	36,567	33.12
Democratic	Stephanie Stahl Hamilton	33,231	30.10
Republican	Deborah McEwen	20,484	18.55
Republican	Damien Kennedy	20,125	18.23
Total votes		110,407	100%
Democratic hold			
Democratic hold			

=== District 22 ===
2022 Arizona House of Representatives election, 22nd district
Party	Candidate	Votes	%
Democratic	Lupe Contreras	25,974	53.03
Democratic	Leezah Sun	23,004	46.97
Total votes		48,978	100%
Democratic hold			
Democratic hold			

=== District 23 ===
2022 Arizona House of Representatives election, 23rd district
Party	Candidate	Votes	%
Democratic	Mariana Sandoval	26,986	36.25
Republican	Michele Pena	25,268	33.94
Democratic	Jesús Lugo Jr.	22,191	29.81
Total votes		74,445	100%
Democratic hold			
Republican win (new seat)			

=== District 24 ===
2022 Arizona House of Representatives election, 24th district
Party	Candidate	Votes	%
Democratic	Analise Ortiz	20,403	50.50
Democratic	Lydia Hernandez	19,999	49.50
Total votes		40,402	100%
Democratic hold			
Democratic win (new seat)			

=== District 25 ===
2022 Arizona House of Representatives election, 25th district
Party	Candidate	Votes	%
Republican	Tim Dunn (incumbent)	50,099	51.95
Republican	Michael Carbone	46,341	48.05
Total votes		96,440	100%
Republican hold			
Republican hold			

=== District 26 ===
2022 Arizona House of Representatives election, 26th district
Party	Candidate	Votes	%
Democratic	Cesar Aguilar	21,795	54.02
Democratic	Flavio Bravo	18,554	45.98
Total votes		40,349	100%
Democratic hold			
Democratic hold			

=== District 27 ===
2022 Arizona House of Representatives election, 27th district
Party	Candidate	Votes	%
Republican	Ben Toma (incumbent)	40,249	34.60
Republican	Kevin Payne (incumbent)	40,240	34.59
Democratic	Don Kissinger	35,839	30.81
Total votes		116,328	100%
Republican hold			
Republican hold			

=== District 28 ===
2022 Arizona House of Representatives election, 28th district
Party	Candidate	Votes	%
Republican	Beverly Pingerelli (incumbent)	68,965	38.08
Republican	David Livingston	66,983	36.98
Democratic	Stephanie Holbrook	45,180	24.94
Total votes		181,128	100%
Republican hold			
Republican hold			

=== District 29 ===
2022 Arizona House of Representatives election, 29th district
Party	Candidate	Votes	%
Republican	Steve Montenegro	46,831	36.41
Republican	Austin Smith	45,636	35.48
Democratic	Scott Podeyn	36,162	28.11
Total votes		128,629	100%
Republican win (new seat)			
Republican hold			

=== District 30 ===
2022 Arizona House of Representatives election, 30th district
Party	Candidate	Votes	%
Republican	Leo Biasiucci (incumbent)	62,416	56.28
Republican	John Gillette	48,489	43.72
Total votes		110,905	100%
Republican hold			
Republican hold			

== See also ==
- 2022 Arizona elections
  - 2022 Arizona Senate election
