= 56th Arizona State Legislature =

Session of the Arizona Legislature

←	55th	57th	→
- Arizona State Capitol (2014)

Overview
- Legislative body: Arizona State Legislature
- Jurisdiction: Arizona, United States
- Term: January 1, 2023 – December 31, 2024

Senate
- Members: 30
- President: Warren Petersen
- Temporary President: T. J. Shope
- Party control: Republican (16–14)

House of Representatives
- Members: 60
- Speaker: Ben Toma
- Party control: Republican (31–29)

Sessions
- 1st: January 9, 2023 – July 31, 2023
- 2nd: January 8, 2024 – June 15, 2024

The 56th Arizona State Legislature, consisted of the Arizona Senate and the Arizona House of Representatives, and was constituted in Phoenix, Arizona, United States on January 9, 2023, during the first two years of Katie Hobbs's first full term in office. Both the Senate and the House membership remained constant at 30 and 60, respectively. In the November 2022 Senate election, Republicans maintained an unchanged 16–14 majority. Republicans also maintained an unchanged 31–29 majority in the House after the November 2022 House election.

== Sessions ==
The Legislature met in its first regular session at the State Capitol in Phoenix. The session opened on January 9, 2023. The session adjourned sine die on July 31, 2023, making it the longest session in Arizona legislative history.

The second regular session began on January 8, 2024. The session adjourned sine die on June 15, 2024.

== Senate ==
=== Members ===
The asterisk (*) denotes members of the previous Legislature who continued in office as members of this Legislature.

District	Senator	Party	Notes
1	Ken Bennett	Republican	
2	Steve Kaiser	Republican	
3	John Kavanagh	Republican	
4	Christine Marsh*	Democratic	
5	Lela Alston*	Democratic	
6	Theresa Hatathlie*	Democratic	
7	Wendy Rogers*	Republican	
8	Juan Mendez*	Democratic	
9	Eva Burch	Democratic	
10	Dave Farnsworth	Republican	
11	Catherine Miranda	Democratic	
12	Mitzi Epstein	Democratic	
13	J. D. Mesnard*	Republican	
14	Warren Petersen*	Republican	
15	Jake Hoffman	Republican	
16	T. J. Shope*	Republican	
17	Justine Wadsack	Republican	
18	Priya Sundareshan	Democratic	
19	David Gowan*	Republican	
20	Sally Ann Gonzales*	Democratic	
21	Rosanna Gabaldón*	Democratic	
22	Eva Diaz	Democratic	
23	Brian Fernandez	Democratic	
24	Anna Hernandez	Democratic	
25	Sine Kerr*	Republican	
26	Raquel Terán*	Democratic	
27	Anthony Kern	Republican	
28	Frank Carroll	Democratic	
29	Janae Shamp	Republican	
30	Sonny Borrelli*	Republican	

== House of Representatives ==
=== Members ===
The asterisk (*) denotes members of the previous Legislature who continued in office as members of this Legislature.

District	Representative	Party	Notes
1	Quang Nguyen*	Republican	
1	Selina Bliss	Republican	
2	Judy Schwiebert*	Democrat	
2	Justin Wilmeth*	Republican	
3	Joseph Chaplik*	Republican	
3	Alexander Kolodin	Republican	
4	Matt Gress	Republican	
4	Laura Terech	Democratic	
5	Jennifer Longdon*	Democratic	
5	Amish Shah*	Democratic	
6	Myron Tsosie*	Democratic	
6	Mae Peshlakai	Democratic	
7	David Cook*	Republican	
7	David Marshall	Republican	
8	Athena Salman*	Democratic	
8	Melody Hernandez*	Democratic	
9	Lorena Austin	Democrat	
9	Seth Blattman	Democrat	
10	Justin Heap	Republican	
10	Barbara Parker	Republican	
11	Marcelino Quiñonez*	Democratic	
11	Oscar De Los Santos	Democratic	
12	Patty Contreras	Democratic	
12	Stacey Travers	Democratic	
13	Jennifer Pawlik*	Democratic	
13	Liz Harris	Republican	
14	Travis Grantham*	Republican	
14	Laurin Hendrix	Republican	
15	Jacqueline Parker*	Republican	
15	Neal Carter*	Republican	
16	Teresa Martinez*	Republican	
16	Keith Seaman	Democratic	
17	Rachel Jones	Republican	
17	Cory McGarr	Republican	
18	Christopher Mathis*	Democrat	
18	Nancy Gutierrez	Democrat	
19	Gail Griffin*	Republican	
19	Lupe Diaz*	Republican	
20	Andrés Cano*	Democratic	
20	Alma Hernandez*	Democrat	
21	Consuelo Hernandez	Democratic	
21	Stephanie Stahl Hamilton	Democratic	
22	Lupe Contreras	Democratic	
22	Leezah Sun	Democratic	
23	Mariana Sandoval	Democratic	
23	Michele Pena	Republican	
24	Lydia Hernandez	Democrat	
24	Analise Ortiz	Democrat	
25	Tim Dunn*	Republican	
25	Michael Carbone	Republican	
26	Cesar Aguilar	Democrat	
26	Flavio Bravo	Democrat	
27	Kevin Payne*	Republican	
27	Ben Toma*	Republican	
28	David Livingston	Republican	
28	Beverly Pingerelli*	Republican	
29	Steve Montenegro	Republican	
29	Austin Smith	Republican	
30	Leo Biasiucci*	Republican	
30	John Gillette	Republican	
