= Darin Mitchell =

American politician

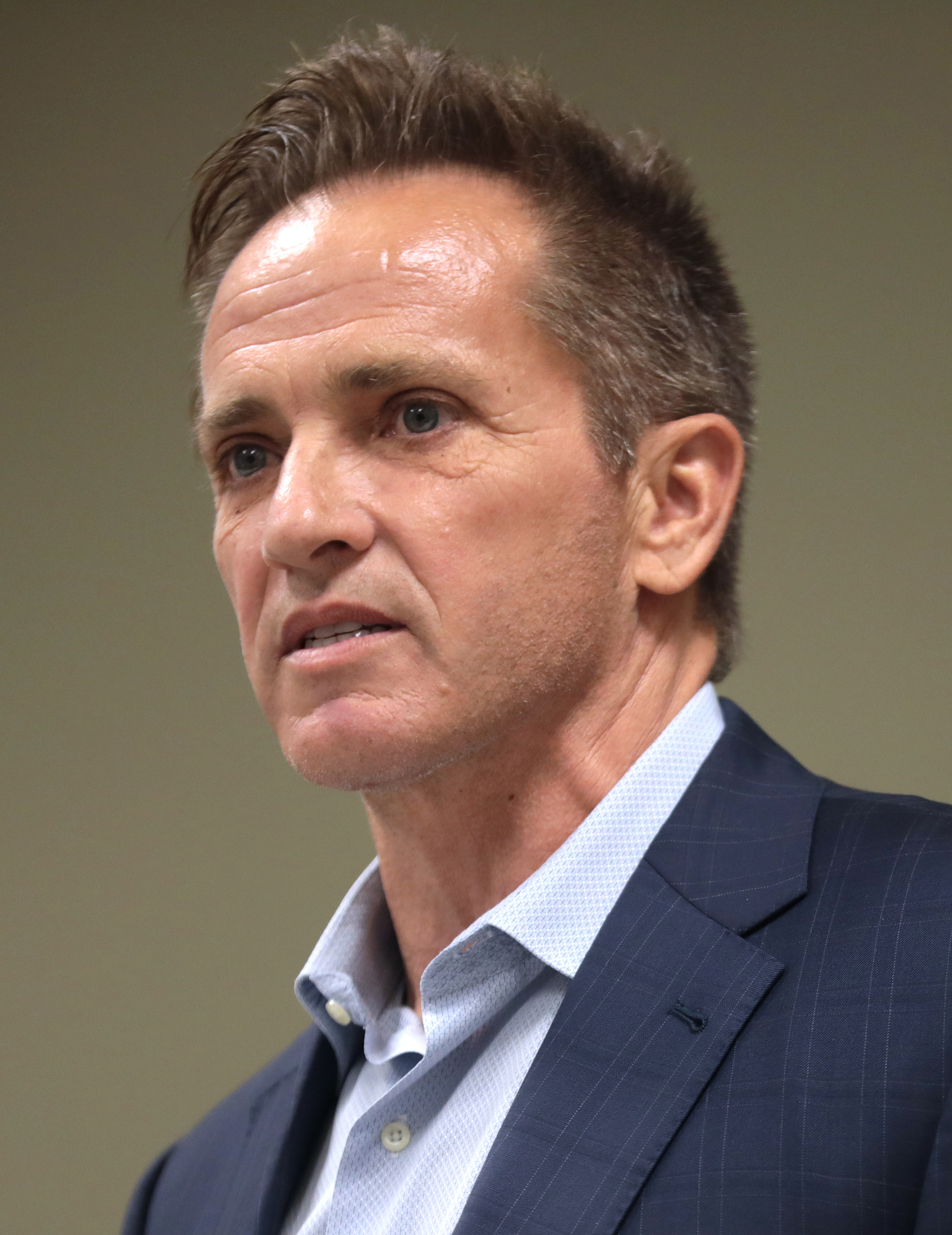
- Mitchell in 2021

Member of the Arizona House of Representatives from the 13th district
- In office January 14, 2013 – January 14, 2019
- Succeeded by: Joanne Osborne

Personal details
- Born: Alma, Michigan
- Party: Republican
- Education: Arizona State University
- Website: darin-mitchell.com

Darin Mitchell (born in Alma, Michigan) is an American politician and a former Republican member of the Arizona House of Representatives representing District 13 since January 14, 2013 until he was defeated for reelection.

== Education ==
Mitchell earned his BS in political science from Arizona State University.

== Elections ==
- In 2022, Mitchell moved to a new district to seek election and falsely claimed to have been endorsed by President Trump.
- 2014 Mitchell and Steve Montenegro defeated Diane Landis in the Republican primary. Mitchell and Montenegro defeated Steve Hansen in the general election.
- 2012 With incumbent Democratic Representatives Anna Tovar running for Arizona Senate, Martín Quezada redistricted to District 29, and Republican Representatives Steve Montenegro redistricted from District 12 and Russ Jones redistricted from District 24, Mitchell ran in the three-way August 28, 2012 Republican Primary; Representative Montenegro placed first, Mitchell placed second with 8,572 votes, and Representative Jones placed third; Mitchell won the second seat in the November 6, 2012 General election with 35,968 votes above four write-in candidates. Representative Jones had challenged Mitchell's legal qualifications as a candidate, alleging that he did not actually reside in the district as he claimed. The Superior Court agreed that Mitchell had violated Arizona election law and misrepresented his true place of residence. The decision was reversed on appeal on purely procedural grounds.
