= 2022 Arizona State Treasurer election =

- November 8, 2022
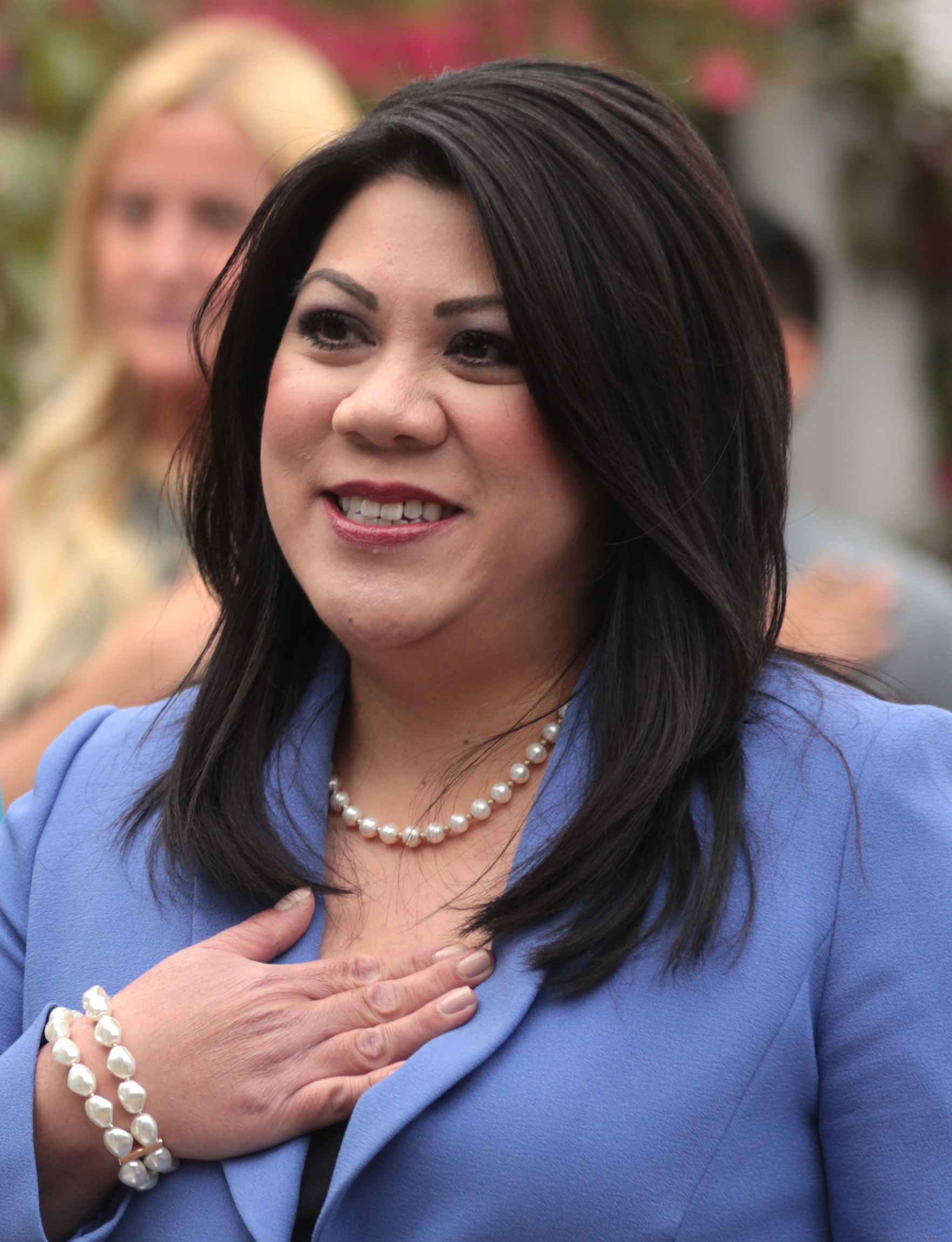

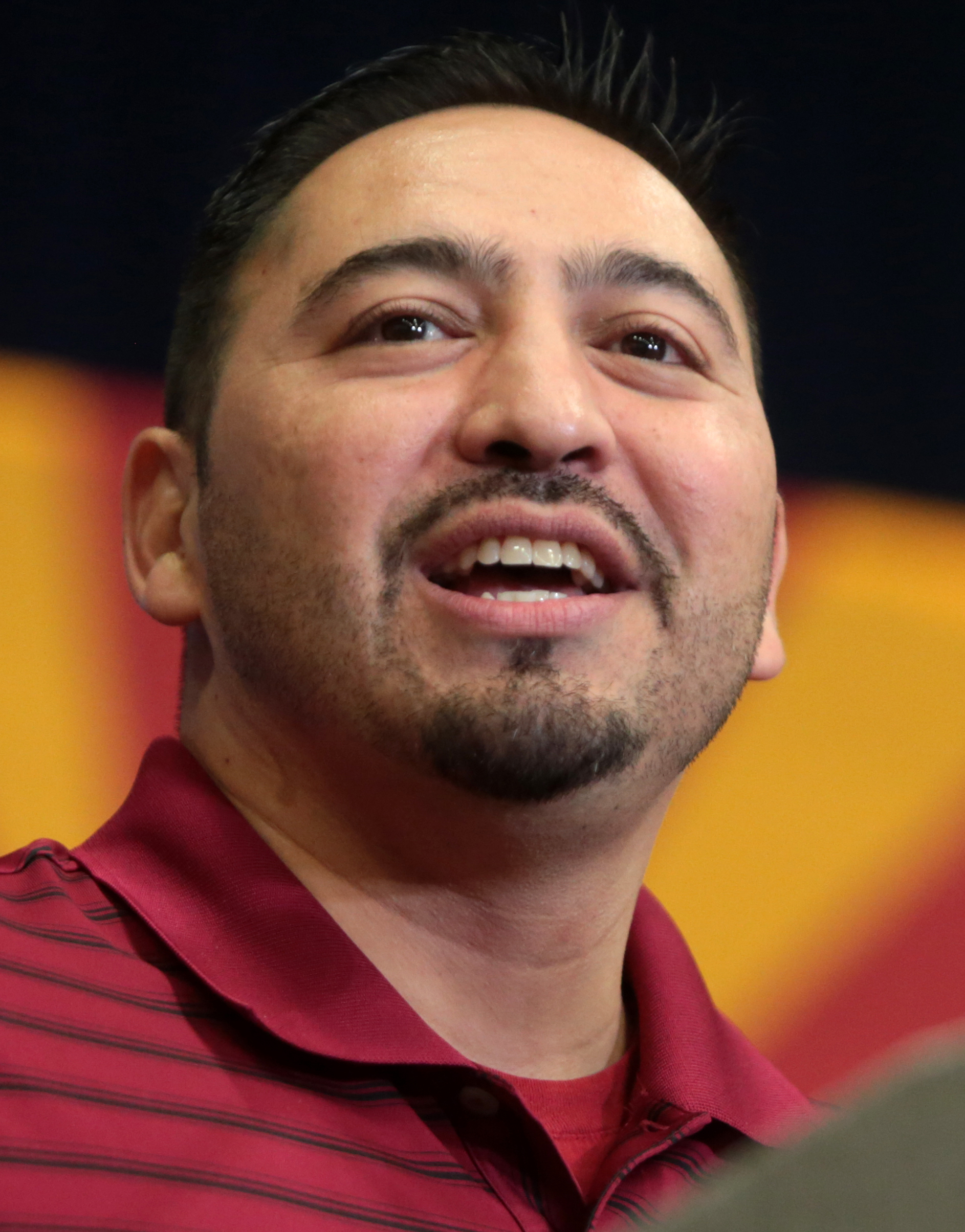
Nominee	Kimberly Yee	Martín Quezada
Party	Republican	Democratic
Popular vote	1,390,135	1,107,037
Percentage	55.67%	44.33%
- Yee: 50–60% 60–70% 70–80% 80–90% >90% Quezada: 50–60% 60–70% 70–80% 80–90% >90% Tie: 50% No votes
State Treasurer before election
Kimberly Yee
Republican
Elected State Treasurer
Kimberly Yee
Republican

The 2022 Arizona State Treasurer election took place on November 8, 2022, to elect the State Treasurer of Arizona, concurrently with other federal and state elections. Incumbent Republican Treasurer Kimberly Yee initially ran for governor, but suspended her campaign on January 15, 2022, and ran for re-election as the Republican nominee, defeating the Democratic nominee, State Senator Martín Quezada, by a margin of 11.4%.

Yee's was the largest margin of victory in a contested statewide election in Arizona in 2022, and this was considered one of the few highlights for the Arizona GOP in an otherwise lackluster cycle. Yee was the only Republican to carry Maricopa County in a contested statewide election in 2022.

== Republican primary ==
=== Candidates ===
==== Declared ====
- Bob Lettieri, former treasurer of the Arizona Republican Party
- Jeff Weninger, state representative for the 17th district
- Kimberly Yee, incumbent state treasurer

==== Withdrew ====
- Regina Cobb, state representative from the 5th district (endorsed Weninger)
- David Livingston, state senator from the 22nd district (running for state representative)

=== Endorsements ===
David Livingston (withdrew)

U.S Representatives

- Paul Gosar, U.S. Representative from Arizona's 4th congressional district (2011–present)
Jeff Weninger

State legislators

- Regina Cobb, state representative for the 5th district (2015–2023)
Kimberly Yee

Organizations

- Family Research Council Action PAC

=== Debate ===
2022 Arizona State Treasurer Republican primary debate
No.	Date	Host	Moderator	Link	Republican	Republican	Republican
Key: P Participant A Absent N Not invited I Invited W Withdrawn							
Key: P Participant A Absent N Not invited I Invited W Withdrawn					Bob Lettieri	Jeff Weninger	Kimberly Yee
1	Jun. 27, 2022	KAET	Ted Simons	YouTube	P	P	P

=== Polling ===
Poll source	Date(s) administered	Sample size (Note: Key: A – all adults RV – registered voters LV – likely voters V – unclear)	Margin of error	Bob Lettieri	Jeff Weninger	Kimberly Yee	Other	Undecided
OH Predictive Insights	July 27, 2022	502 (LV)	± 4.4%	7%	12%	33%	–	48%
OH Predictive Insights	June 30 – July 2, 2022	515 (LV)	± 4.3%	5%	5%	19%	–	72%
Data Orbital (R)	June 1–3, 2022	550 (LV)	± 4.3%	–	9%	24%	7%	60%
OH Predictive Insights	April 4–5, 2022	500 (LV)	± 4.4%	3%	7%	21%	–	69%

=== Results ===
Results by county Yee: 50–60%; 60–70%

Republican primary results
Party	Candidate	Votes	%
Republican	Kimberly Yee (incumbent)	423,456	56.40%
Republican	Jeff Weninger	203,751	27.14%
Republican	Bob Lettieri	123,574	16.46%
Total votes		750,781	100.0%

== Democratic primary ==
=== Candidates ===
==== Declared ====
- Martín Quezada, state senator from the 29th district

=== Results ===
Democratic primary results
Party	Candidate	Votes	%
Democratic	Martín Quezada	554,186	100.0%
Total votes		554,186	100.0%

== General election ==
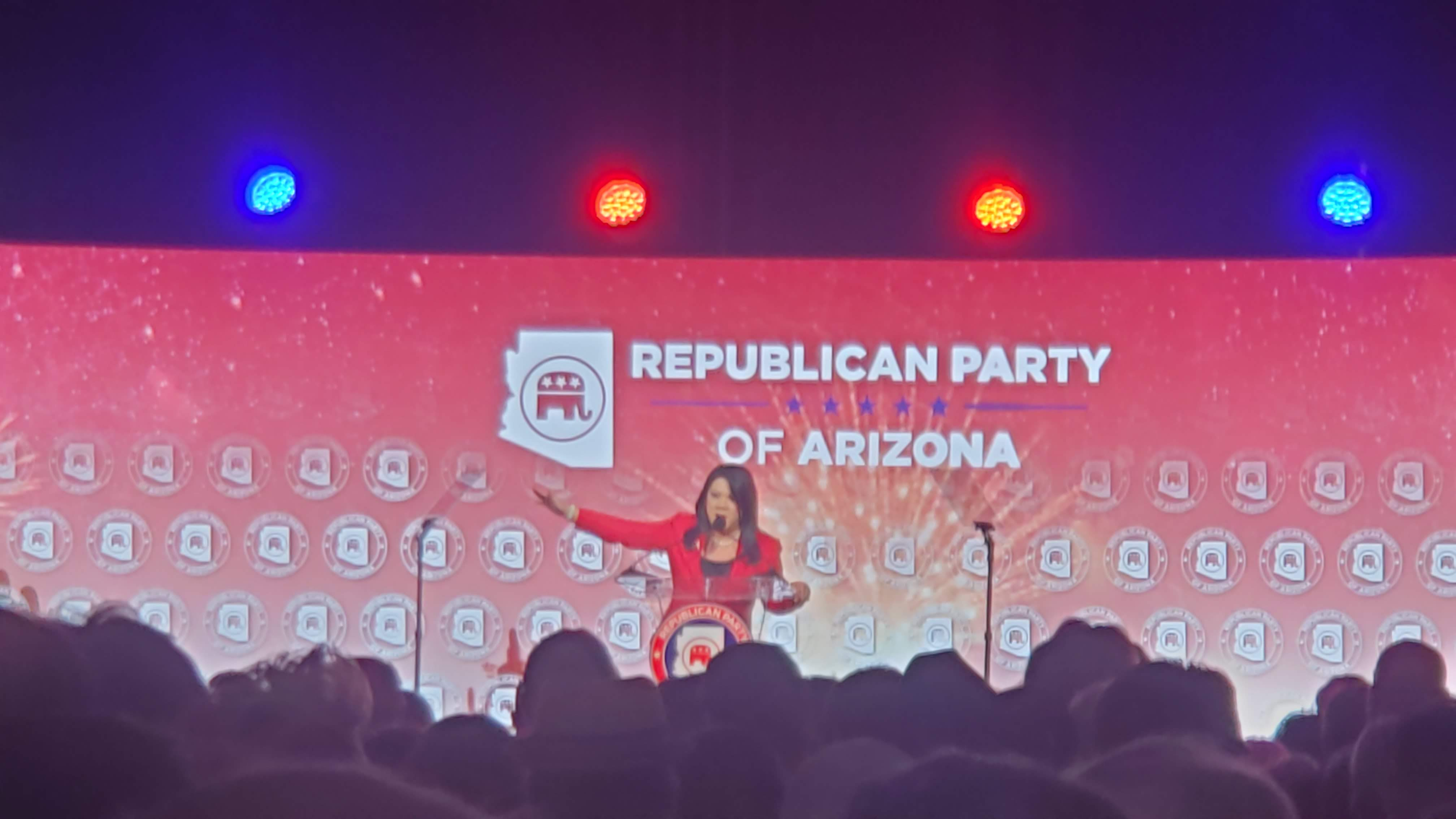
Yee speaks at the 2022 AZGOP election night party in Scottsdale.

=== Debate ===
2022 Arizona State Treasurer debate
No.	Date	Host	Moderator	Link	Republican	Democratic
Key: P Participant A Absent N Not invited I Invited W Withdrawn						
Key: P Participant A Absent N Not invited I Invited W Withdrawn					Kimberly Yee	Martín Quezada
1	Oct. 3, 2022	KAET	Stacey Barchenger; Ralph Begleiter	YouTube	P	P

=== Polling ===
Poll source	Date(s) administered	Sample size	Margin of error	Kimberly Yee (R)	Martin Quezada (D)	Other	Undecided
BSP Research/Shaw & Co. (Note: Poll conducted for Univision.)	October 19–26, 2022	1,000 (RV)	± 3.1%	41%	29%	5% (Note: "Someone else" with 5%)	25%

=== Results ===
State legislative district results Yee: 50–60% 60–70% 70–80% Quezada: 50–60% 60–70% 70–80%

2022 Arizona State Treasurer election
Party	Candidate	Votes	%	±%
Republican	Kimberly Yee (incumbent)	1,390,135	55.67%	+1.39%
Democratic	Martín Quezada	1,107,037	44.33%	−1.39%
Total votes		2,497,172	100.0%	
Republican hold				

==== By county ====
County	Martín Quezada Democratic		Kimberly Yee Republican	
County	#	%	#	%
Apache	16,518	62.9%	9,758	37.1%
Cochise	16,524	35.8%	29,624	64.2%
Coconino	31,244	58.5%	22,159	41.5%
Gila	6,553	29.5%	15,685	70.5%
Graham	2,623	24.4%	8,122	75.6%
Greenlee	853	35.6%	1,545	64.4%
La Paz	1,419	26.1%	4,013	73.9%
Maricopa	668,142	44.6%	830,056	55.4%
Mohave	16,586	20.7%	63,562	79.3%
Navajo	16,318	41.0%	23,492	59.0%
Pima	215,239	54.8%	177,369	45.2%
Pinal	51,978	36.7%	89,559	63.3%
Santa Cruz	8,292	64.0%	4,666	36.0%
Yavapai	36,555	30.5%	83,417	69.5%
Yuma	18,192	40.2%	27,108	59.8%
Totals	1,107,037	44.33%	1,390,135	55.67%

==== By congressional district ====
Yee won seven out of nine congressional districts, including one that elected a Democrat.

District	Yee	Quezada	Representative
1st	56%	44%	David Schweikert
2nd	59%	41%	Tom O'Halleran (117th Congress)
2nd	59%	41%	Eli Crane (118th Congress)
3rd	28%	72%	Ruben Gallego
4th	51%	49%	Greg Stanton
5th	64%	36%	Andy Biggs
6th	54%	46%	Ann Kirkpatrick (117th Congress)
6th	54%	46%	Juan Ciscomani (118th Congress)
7th	37%	63%	Raúl Grijalva
8th	62%	38%	Debbie Lesko
9th	68%	32%	Paul Gosar

== See also ==
- 2022 Arizona elections

== Notes ==
Partisan clients
