= Arizona's 27th legislative district =

American legislative district

- Map of District 27: Approved January 21, 2022
- Senator: Anthony Kern (R)
- House members: Kevin Payne (R); Ben Toma (R)
- Registration: 37.84% Republican; 26.58% Democratic; 33.77% Other
- Demographics: 59% White; 6% Black/African American; 2% Native American; 5% Asian; 25% Hispanic
- Population: 240,634
- Voting-age population: 187,248
- Registered voters: 136,164

Arizona's 27th legislative district is one of 30 in the state, consisting of a section of Maricopa County. As of 2023, there are 51 precincts in the district, all in Maricopa, with a total registered voter population of 136,164. The district has an overall population of 240,634.

Following the 2020 United States redistricting cycle, the Arizona Independent Redistricting Commission (AIRC) redrew legislative district boundaries in Arizona. According to the AIRC, the district is outside of competitive range and considered leaning Republican.

== Political representation ==
The district is represented in the 56th Arizona State Legislature, which convenes from January 1, 2023, to December 31, 2024, by Anthony Kern (R-Glendale) in the Arizona Senate and by Kevin Payne (R-Sun City) and Ben Toma (R-Peoria) in the Arizona House of Representatives.

Name	Image	Residence	Office	Party
Anthony Kern		Glendale	State senator	Republican
Kevin Payne		Sun City	State representative	Republican
Ben Toma		Peoria	State representative	Republican

== Election results ==
The 2022 elections were the first in the newly drawn district.

=== Arizona Senate ===
2022 Arizona's 27th Senate district election
Party	Candidate	Votes	%
Republican	Anthony Kern	43,719	55.14
Democratic	Brittani Barraza	35,574	44.86
Total votes		79,293	100
Republican hold			

=== Arizona House of Representatives ===
2022 Arizona House of Representatives election, 27th district
Party	Candidate	Votes	%
Republican	Ben Toma (incumbent)	40,249	34.60
Republican	Kevin Payne (incumbent)	40,240	34.59
Democratic	Don Kissinger	35,839	30.81
Total votes		116,328	100.00
Republican hold			
Republican hold			

== See also ==
- List of Arizona legislative districts
- Arizona State Legislature
