= Janae Shamp =

American politician

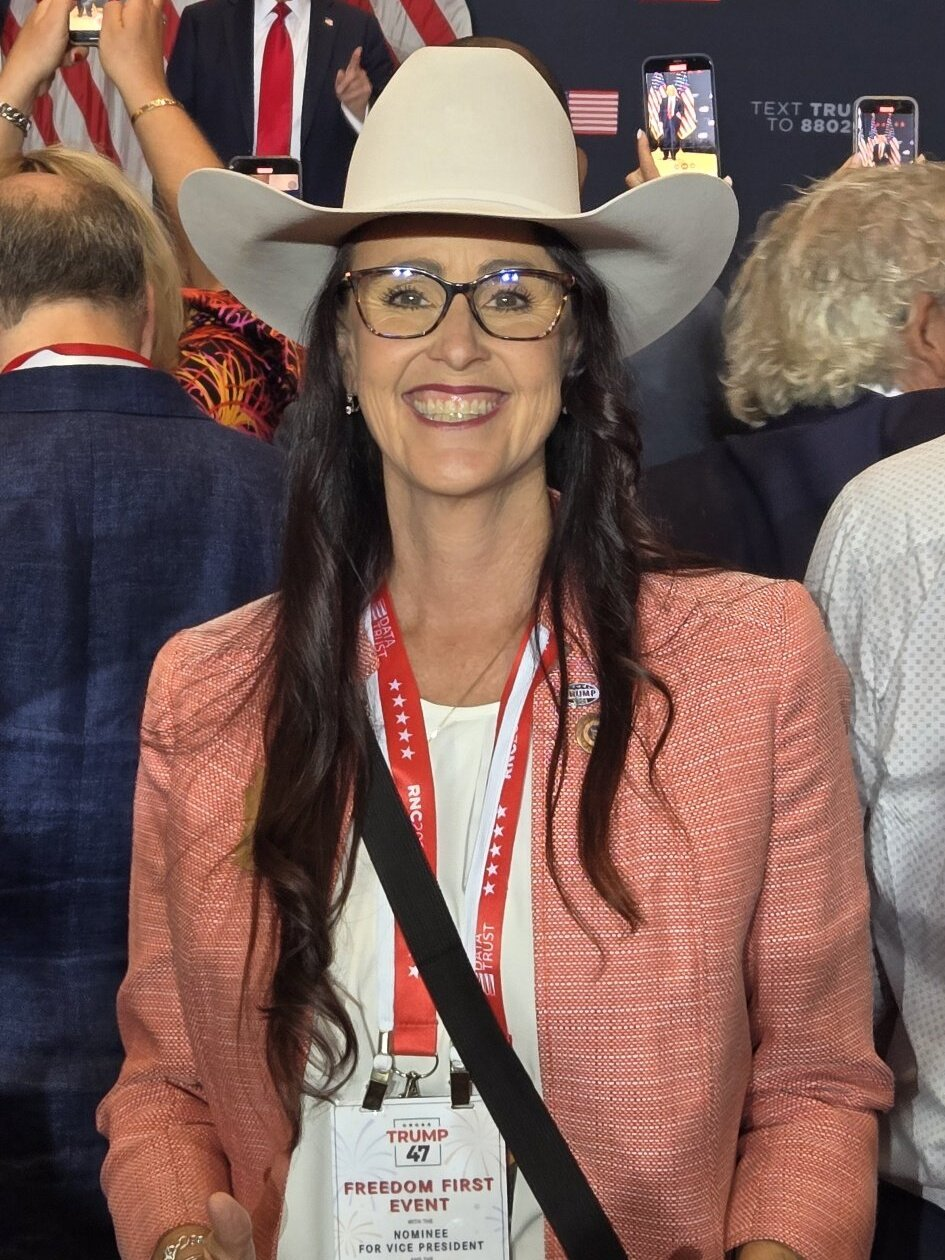
- Shamp in 2024

Majority Leader of the Arizona Senate
- In office January 13, 2025 – June 27, 2025
- Preceded by: Sonny Borrelli
- Succeeded by: John Kavanagh

Member of the Arizona Senate from the 29th district
- Incumbent
- Assumed office January 9, 2023
- Preceded by: Martín Quezada

Personal details
- Party: Republican
- Education: Arizona State University, Tempe (BS); Grand Canyon University (BS)
- Website: Campaign website

Janae Shamp is an American politician and nurse representing Arizona's 29th legislative district in the Arizona State Senate since 2022. Shamp is a registered member of the Republican Party and was one of several legislative candidates endorsed by former president Donald Trump in Arizona.

== Elections ==
=== 2022 state senate run ===
Shamp defeated incumbent state representative Joanne Osborne in the Republican primary. Shamp then defeated Democratic opponent David Raymer in the general election for Arizona State Senate District 29 on November 8, 2022.

=== 2024 state senate run ===
Shamp ran unopposed in her 2024 Primary and advanced from the Republican primary for Arizona State Senate District 29 on July 30, 2024. She went on to defeat Democrat Eric Stafford in the general election.

== Political career ==
=== Committee assignments ===
- Finance Committee
- Government Committee
- Senate Health and Human Services Committee, Vice Chair
- Senate Ethics Committee

== Political positions ==
=== Abortion ===
Shamp is a self-proclaimed "pro-life, constitutional conservative." Shamp voted against HB2677, a bill that repeals the 1864 near-total ban on Abortion in Arizona.

In her responses on the Arizona Voter Guide, Shamp openly expressed her opposition to "Amending the Arizona State Constitution to grant a fundamental right to every individual to an abortion." She also opposed “using taxpayer funds to support any organization that performs, promotes, or provides referrals for abortion.” Shamp has also sponsored the "Born Alive" abortion bill S.B. 1600 which "updates Arizona law requiring health professionals to provide care for babies born alive during an abortion attempt to include babies born alive with potentially fatal conditions that are sometimes left to die before their time."

=== Education ===
Shamp supports “allowing all parents to use tax credits and taxpayer funded empowerment scholarship accounts to enable their children to attend any private school, homeschool, or online academy of their choice.”

=== Immigration ===
Shamp voted to pass a bill that would allow property owners to kill migrants trespassing on their property. She also introduced Immigration Bill 1231, now Prop 314, “Aims to make illegal border crossing into Arizona a state crime, with penalties varying based on the violation's circumstances. It defines illegal entry, provides affirmative defenses for certain individuals, and outlines procedures for issuing return orders to a foreign nation. The bill also grants civil immunity and indemnification to state and local officials enforcing these laws, except in cases of bad faith or recklessness.”

=== LGBTQ+ and Gender Identity ===
Shamp openly expressed her support of “Allowing parents to seek professional counseling for their minor child with same-sex attraction or gender identity issues,” and she opposed adding “sexual orientation,” “gender identity,” or “gender expression” to the protected classes of race, religion, age, sex, and ancestry in nondiscrimination law.

Shamp sponsored SB1511, Arizona's "De-transitioner bill," that would require insurers and providers of gender-altering drugs and surgeries to also provide and cover detransition procedures.

She also co-sponsored SB1628 which, "would eliminate every mention of gender in state law and replace it with 'sex,' a definition restricted to male or female and based on a person’s reproductive characteristics."

She also voted yes on three other school and gender related bills: SB1001, which prohibits teachers from using a child's preferred pronouns without parental consent, which was vetoed by Katie Hobbs followed by a written statement; SB 1040, which prohibits students from using the bathrooms most aligned with their gender identity; and the "parental bill of rights," which allowed for litigation against schools that provide LGBTQ+ affirming spaces.

Shamp has voted for various bills restricting the legality of drag shows and trying to prevent children from being exposed to drag shows.

=== Other Views ===
Shamp proposed SB1407, which would require employers to allow employees to opt out of a number of vaccinations based on religious views.

Shamp voted to lower the minimum wage for tipped workers by 25% below minimum wage.

== Controversies ==
=== January 6th and Stolen Election Claims ===
Shamp participated in the “Stop the Steal” rally on January 6, 2021, and made claims that the 2020 election was stolen.

She was placed on the election threat index and was 1 of 46 public officials in Arizona have credibly participated in election denial activities including being present at the Capitol on January 6 and denying the validity of the 2020 election outcome.

Shamp was the prime sponsor of SB1158, aiming to change the law to ensure Donald Trump and future politicians cannot be barred from running for president in Arizona for supporting an insurrection and violating the 14th Amendment.

=== Anti-Public School Sentiments ===
On the Senate floor February 2023 Shamp stated the following on camera ,"Our public education system is broken,"... "We should not fund broken"

=== COVID-19 ===
Shamp has been accused of spreading COVID-19 misinformation on several occasions including when she co-chaired an interim committee called the Novel Coronavirus Southwestern Intergovernmental Committee. Otherwise known as 'NSWIC' an acronym that aligns with the QAnon phrase "Nothing Can Stop What Is Coming". Though she called the accusation "goofy" she allowed conspiracy theorists to spread misinformation while actual health experts and officials from the Arizona Department of Health Services were absent.

=== University of Arizona ===
Shamp expressed her distaste of University of Arizona teaching Nursing students to ask patients about their gender identities stating,” “I’m absolutely sickened that this institution of higher learning is perpetuating the lie that a person’s gender is based on feelings and not their God-given biological sex established upon conception."

=== Extremism ===
Shamp was criticized for flying an "Appeal to Heaven" flag on her desk, a flag originally used by the George Washington but recently adopted by Christian nationalists and far-right groups.

She has retweeted and shared misinformation including many posts from well-known Antisemites, neo-Nazis, and Q-Anon forums.

Arizona Senate
Preceded by Sonny Borrelli	Majority Leader of the Arizona Senate; 2025	Succeeded by John Kavanagh
