= Martín Quezada =

American politician (born 1977)

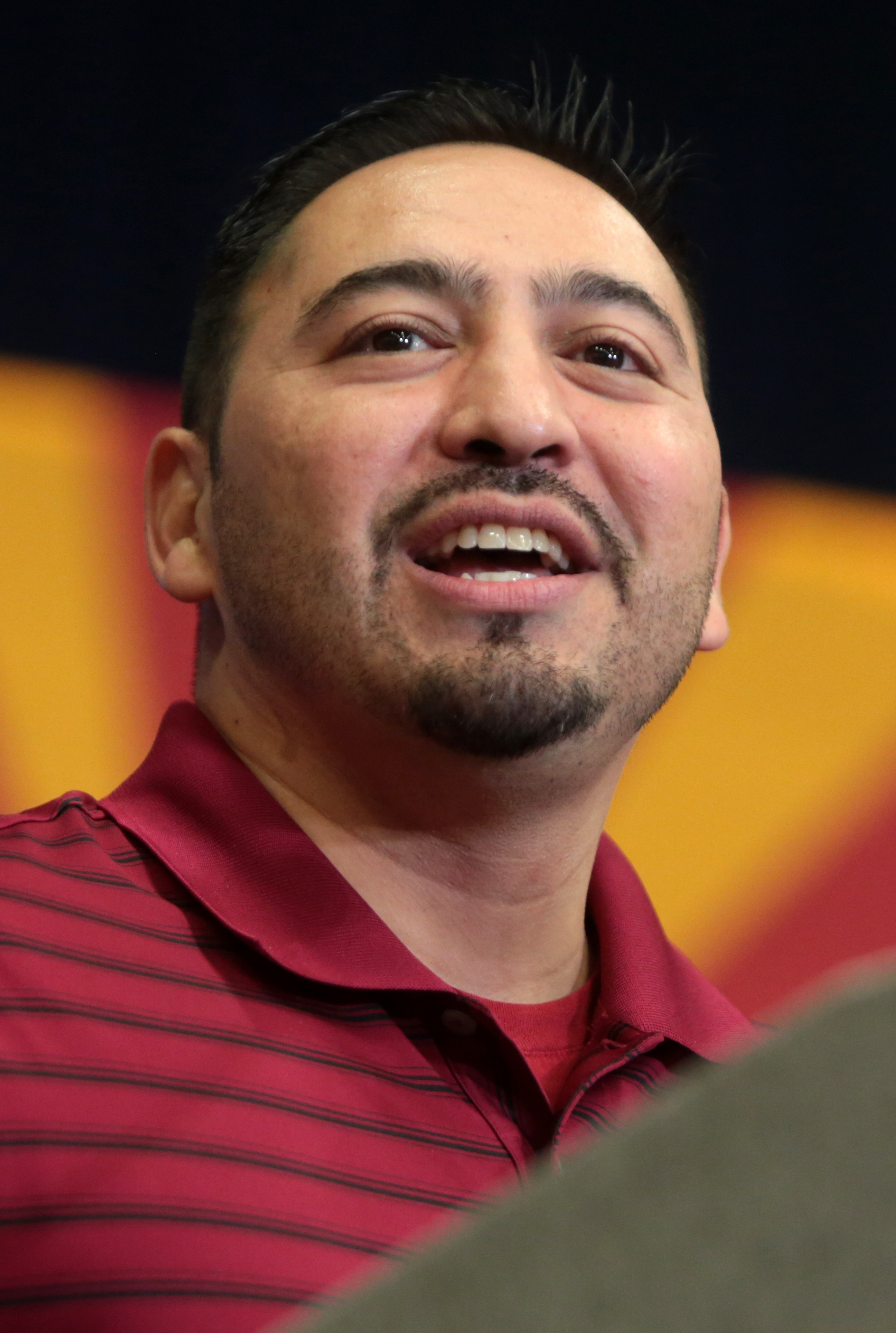
- Quezada in 2016

Member of the Arizona Senate from the 29th district
- In office January 5, 2015 – January 9, 2023
- Preceded by: Steve Gallardo
- Succeeded by: Janae Shamp

Member of the Arizona House of Representatives from the 29th district
- In office January 14, 2013 – January 5, 2015
- Succeeded by: Richard C. Andrade

Personal details
- Born: May 16, 1977 (age 49) Phoenix, Arizona, U.S.
- Party: Democratic
- Education: Glendale Community College; Arizona State University, West (BS); Arizona State University, Tempe (JD)
- Website: Campaign website

Martín J. Quezada (born May 16, 1977) is an American politician who was a Democratic member of the Arizona Senate serving from 2015 to 2023. He is also a member of the Pendergast Elementary School District Governing Board, serving since 2011. He was previously a member of the Arizona House of Representatives from 2013 to 2015. Quezada is also an attorney in private practice, and has served his community in a number of different roles. He previously served as a research analyst and policy adviser to the Arizona state house Democratic caucus.

On September 30, 2021, Martin Quezada entered the 2022 election for State Treasurer of Arizona, but lost the general election to incumbent Treasurer Kimberly Yee.

== Elections ==
- 2016 – Legislative District #29 State Senate Race – Quezada was re-elected after he defeated Lydia Hernandez in the Democratic primary. Quezada defeated Crystal Nuttle in the general election with 68.52% of the vote.
- 2014 – Legislative District #29 State Senate Race – Quezada defeated Lydia Hernandez in the Democratic primary. Quezada beat Crystal Nuttle in the general election with 60.3% of the vote.
- 2014 – Pendergast Elementary School District Governing Board Race – Quezada was re-elected to the Pendergast Elementary School District Governing Board coming in 1st in a 4-way race for 2 seats on the board with 50.1% of the vote.
- 2012 – Legislative District #29 State House of Representatives Race – Quezada came in 1st in a 3-way Democratic primary for 2 seats with 35.66% of the vote. Quezada came in 2nd in a 2-way race for 2 seats in the general election with 47.0% of the vote.
- 2012 – Legislative District #13 State House of Representatives Appointment – Quezada was appointed to State House of Representatives by the Maricopa County Board of Supervisors to fill the seat vacated by Representative Richard Miranda after he was indicted and resigned the office.
- 2010 – Pendergast Elementary School District Governing Board Race – Quezada was appointed to the Pendergast Elementary School District Governing Board after no-one filed to run against him in the general election.
- 2010 – Legislative District #13 State House of Representatives Race – Quezada came in 3rd in a 3-way Democratic Primary for 2 seats with 20.6% of the vote.
- 2006 – Phoenix Union High School District Governing Board Race – Quezada came in 2nd in a 2-way race for 1 seat in Ward #5 of the District with 38.6% of the vote.
