= Leezah Sun =

American politician (born 1970)

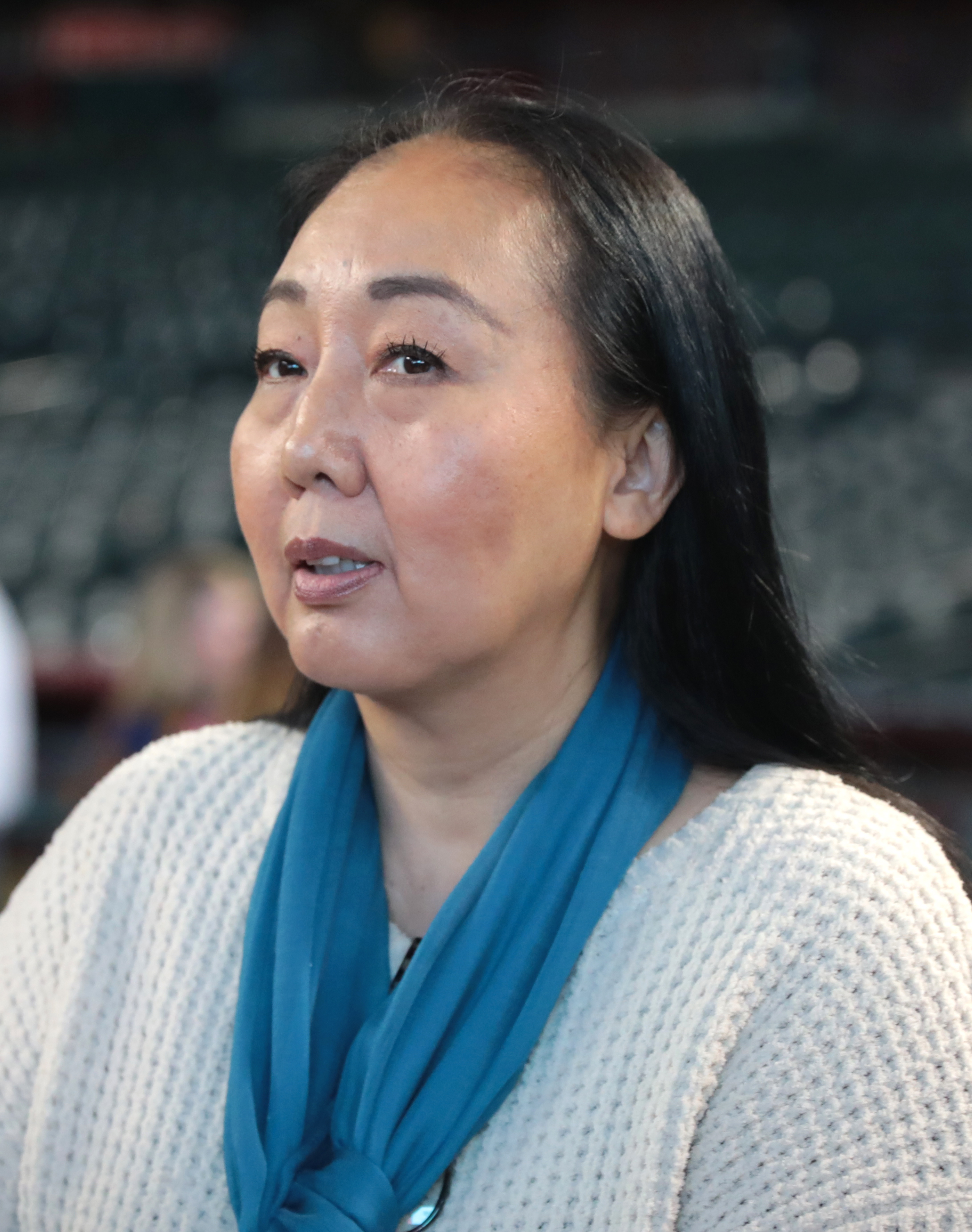

Member of the Arizona House of Representatives from the 22nd district
- In office January 9, 2023 – January 31, 2024 Serving with Lupe Contreras
- Preceded by: Ben Toma
- Succeeded by: Elda Luna-Nájera

Personal details
- Born: 1970 (age 55–56) Jeju City, South Korea
- Party: Democratic (before 2026); Independent (2026–present)
- Education: Drexel University (BS)

Leezah Elsa Sun (born c. 1970) is an American politician and activist. She was a Democratic member of the Arizona House of Representatives elected to represent District 22 in 2022. She is a currently running for Governor of Arizona as an independent in the 2026 Arizona gubernatorial election.

== Biography ==
Sun was born c. 1970 in Jeju City, South Korea to Chinese refugees. In 1977, Sun and her family moved to Michigan.

Sun worked in the pharmaceutical industry on the East Coast of the United States. She moved to Arizona in 2005 and started a family. She was a stay at home mom. Sun was motivated to volunteer with the American Civil Liberties Union of Arizona and the Demand to Learn campaign after her 8 year old son was denied access to gifted educational programs. She registered to vote in 2018. She ran in the 2020 Arizona House of Representatives election and ultimately lost to two incumbents. After the election, she was appointed vice chair of the central region of the Arizona Asian American Pacific Islander Democratic Caucus.

During the 2022 Arizona House of Representatives election, Sun was elected to represent District 22.

Sun resigned from the Arizona House in January 2024 following the release of an ethics report. The report was released as part of a complaint filed by State House Democratic leaders, and investigators determined that Sun engaged in behavior that others deem to be intimidating or threatening on various occasions, including an incident that happened months before she was sworn to office, as well as injecting herself in a child custody situation in which she was not a party to.

On December 22, 2025, Sun announced her independent candidacy for Governor of Arizona in the 2026 election, but she didn't receive enough signatures to qualify on the ballot.
