= Morgan Abraham =

American politician

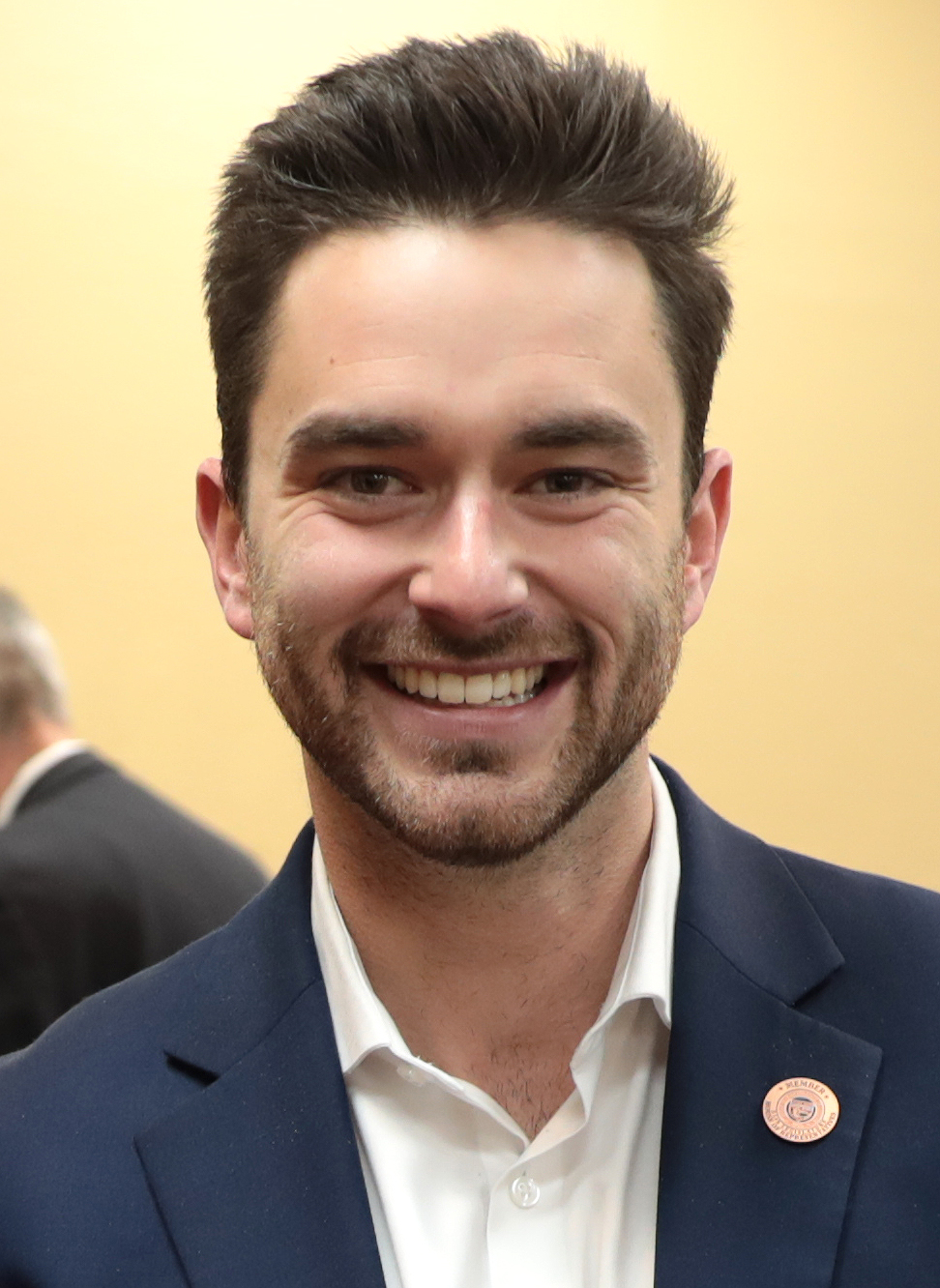
- Abraham in January 2022

Member of the Arizona House of Representatives from the 10th district
- In office December 9, 2021 – January 9, 2023
- Preceded by: Stephanie Stahl Hamilton
- Succeeded by: Nancy Gutierrez

Personal details
- Party: Democratic
- Education: University of Arizona (BS, MBA)

Military service
- Branch/service: United States Army
- Unit: United States Army Reserve

Morgan Abraham is an American businessman, army intelligence officer, and politician who served as a member of the Arizona House of Representatives in 10th district from 2021 to 2023.

== Education ==
Abraham earned a Bachelor of Science degree in engineering from the University of Arizona in 2014 and a Master of Business Administration in finance from the Eller College of Management in 2019. Abraham served as Student Body President of the University of Arizona during his senior year of college. As Student Body President Abraham successfully brought the University's Spring Fling Carnival back to the University of Arizona main campus for the first time in 15 years, worked on student policy engagement and LGBT equity issues. Abraham also successfully lobbied the Arizona Board of Regents and the University of Arizona administration to agree to a "Guaranteed Tuition Plan" for undergraduate students, which locked in their tuition rates during the four year period they attended school, in contrast to the plan proposed by Governor Jan Brewer .

== Career ==
Abraham started his own business ABECAP, or Abraham Capital, in 2013. ABECAP specializes in converting old, dilapidated buildings to housings with a focus on affordable housing. Abraham’s company was involved in the conversion of the Spanish Trail Motel to affordable housing for veterans. The property was purchased for $2.5 million, and was the largest redevelopment in South Tucson in over two decades. The project received praise from city officials for addressing the area's need for more affordable housing for veterans. From 2013 to 2022 Abraham grew ABECAP into one of the largest real estate conversation companies in Southern Arizona.

Before serving in the Arizona House of Representatives Abraham led the opposition campaign to Governor Doug Ducey's proposed ballot initiative, Proposition 123. Abraham argued that the plan proposed by Governor Ducey would insufficiently fund public schools in Arizona. The ballot initiative narrowly passed by a less than 2% margin, despite the "Vote No" campaign spending only $20,265.50 while the "Vote Yes" campaign spent over $5.4 million. In 2017, Abraham joined the United States Army Reserve as an intelligence officer, having received his commission from the ROTC program at the University of Arizona. He is also a managing partner at Abraham Capital, real estate investment firm based in Tucson, Arizona.

Abraham was appointed to the Arizona House of Representatives by the Pima County Board of Supervisors in December 2021, succeeding Stephanie Stahl Hamilton. While in office, Abraham focused his efforts on increasing access to affordable education, including legislation to create universal Pre-K in Arizona. As an active duty intelligence officer in United States Army, Abraham also became a leading voice for commonsense gun reform in the Arizona Legislature. He was defeated for election in the Democratic Party primary in 2022.
