= Russell Bowers =

American politician (born 1952)

Rusty Bowers
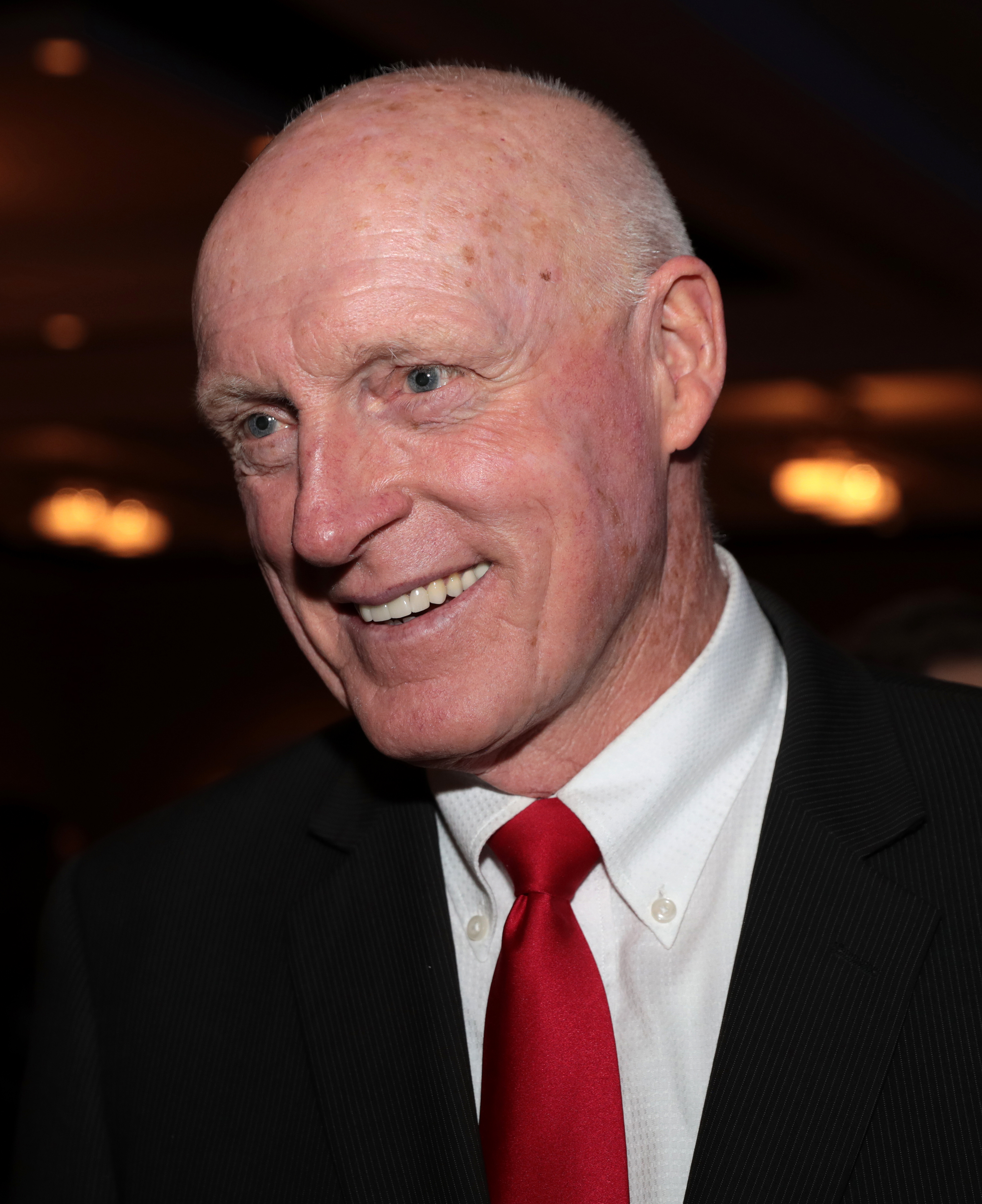
- Bowers in 2019

54th Speaker of the Arizona House of Representatives
- In office January 14, 2019 – January 9, 2023
- Preceded by: J. D. Mesnard
- Succeeded by: Ben Toma

Member of the Arizona House of Representatives from the 25th district
- In office January 5, 2015 – January 9, 2023 Serving with Michelle Udall
- Preceded by: Justin Pierce
- Succeeded by: Michael Carbone

Member of the Arizona Senate from the 21st district
- In office January 1997 – January 2003
- Preceded by: Stan Barnes
- Succeeded by: Jay Tibshraeny

Member of the Arizona House of Representatives from the 21st district
- In office January 1993 – January 1997 Serving with Leslie Whiting Johnson, Marilyn Jarrett
- Preceded by: Stan Barnes
- Succeeded by: Dean Cooley

Personal details
- Born: October 20, 1952 (age 73) Mesa, Arizona, U.S.
- Party: Republican
- Children: 7
- Education: Mesa Community College; Arizona State University, Tempe; Brigham Young University (BFA)
- Website: Official website

Russell "Rusty" Bowers (born October 20, 1952) is an American politician and the former Speaker of the Arizona House of Representatives. A member of the Republican Party, he represented the 25th legislative district from 2015 to 2023, serving as Speaker from 2019. Before that, he served in the Arizona Senate from 1997 to 2001 and the Arizona House from 1993 to 1997.

After Donald Trump's loss in the 2020 U.S. presidential election, Bowers rejected Trump's efforts to challenge or overturn the results in Arizona, where Joe Biden won. In 2022, Bowers ran for the Arizona Senate in the 10th district, losing to Dave Farnsworth in the Republican primary by a 2–1 margin. In January 2023, he was awarded the Presidential Citizens Medal by Biden.

== Early life and education ==
Bowers, who is a fourth-generation Arizonan, grew up on a sheep ranch in Chino Valley. He attended Mesa Community College, Arizona State University, and Brigham Young University. A member of the Church of Jesus Christ of Latter-day Saints, he spent two years as a Mormon missionary in Mexico.

== Refusal to overturn the 2020 presidential election in Arizona ==
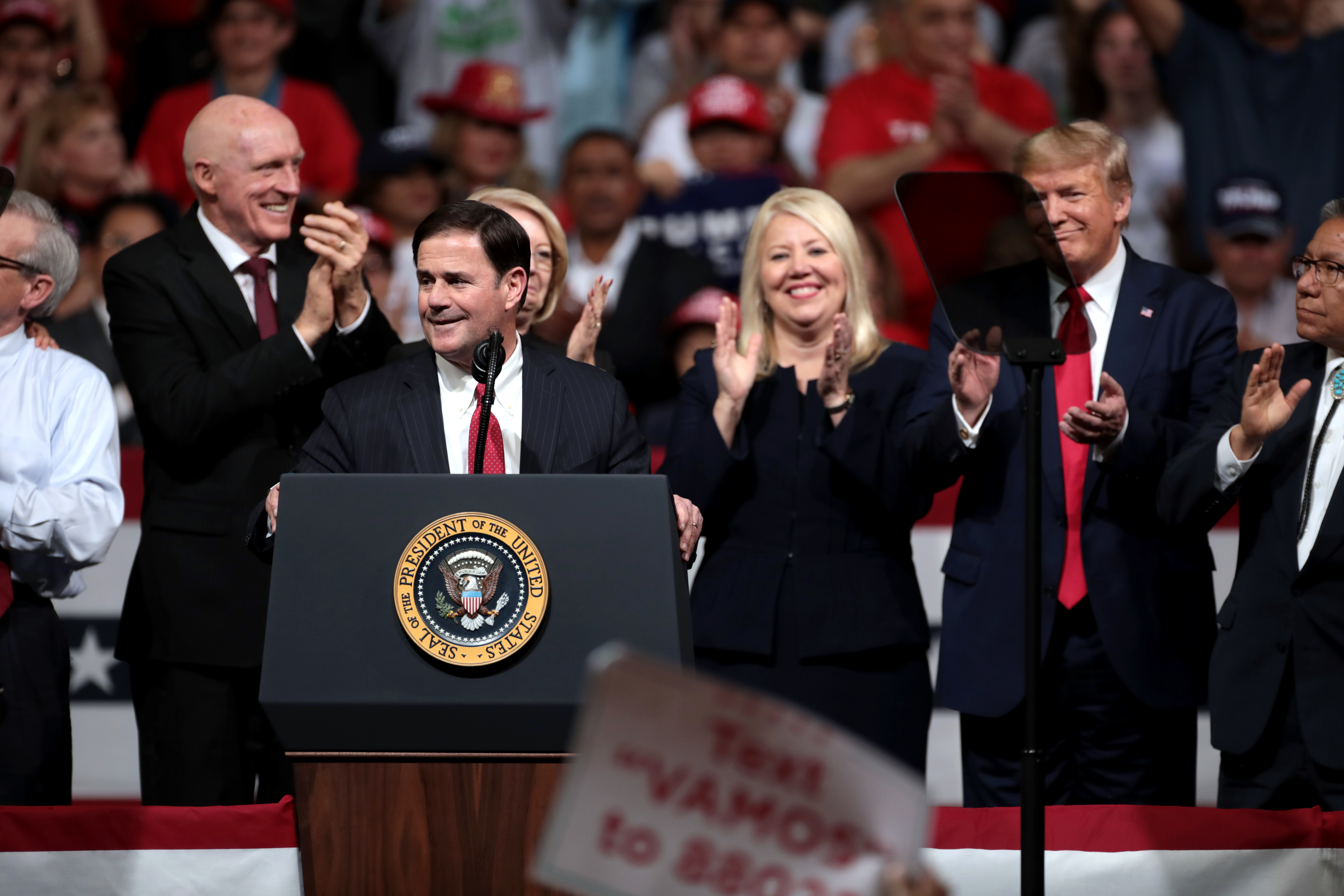
Bowers at a campaign rally with President Donald Trump, Doug Ducey, and Debbie Lesko in February 2020

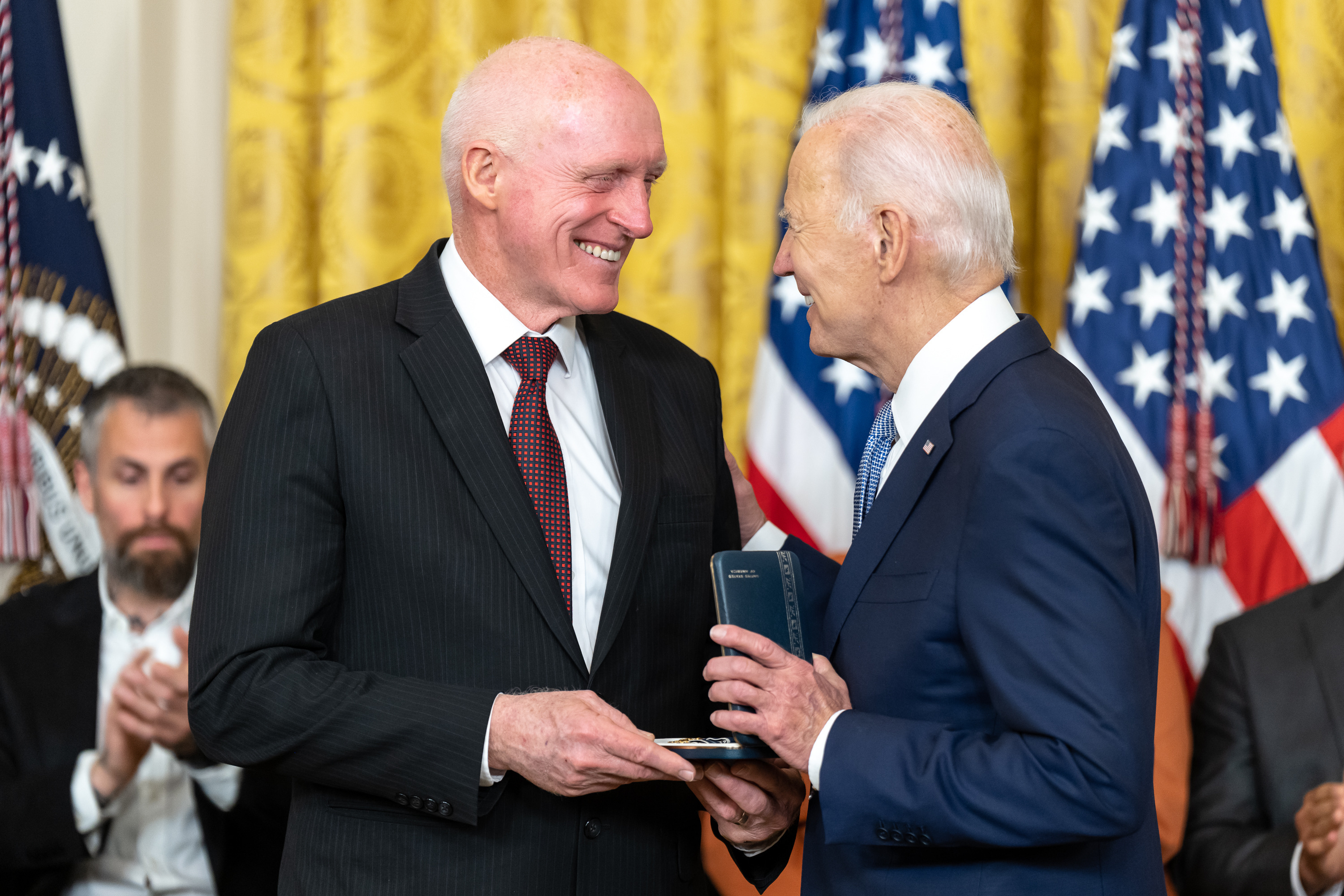
Bowers receives the Presidential Citizens Medal from President Joe Biden in January 2023.

After Donald Trump's loss in the 2020 U.S. presidential election, Bowers refused to cooperate with Trump and Rudy Giuliani in their attempts to overturn the results in Arizona. Bowers publicly stated that there was no evidence whatsoever of election fraud that would otherwise mandate rejection of the results in Arizona. On June 21, 2022, Bowers testified before the House January 6 committee. As part of his testimony, Bowers stated that when he asked Rudy Giuliani for evidence regarding election fraud claims, Giuliani responded, "We have lots of theories, we just don't have the evidence".

In December 2020, colleague Senator Kelly Townsend wanted Bowers to call the legislature into session and appoint an alternate slate of electors. When he refused, Townsend doxed Bowers on Twitter, revealing his home address, and urged her militia followers to protest at his home.

In January 2021, a convoy of Trump supporters rolled up in front of his property, with megaphones and a giant sign accusing him of pedophilia. At the end of December, 2023, Bowers was swatted, with the police getting a false alarm having accused the owner of the premises of having killed his wife. He also received threatening phone calls and e-mails.

In February 2022, Bowers denied a bill in the Arizona House of Representatives which would have allowed the state legislature to override the results of a presidential election in Arizona.

For his efforts in resisting the attempts to overturn the 2020 election results, Bowers was awarded the John F. Kennedy Profile in Courage Award. He was one of five honorees to receive the award that year. On July 19, 2022, the Arizona Republican Party censured Bowers for his resistance.

In 2022, Bowers ran for the State Senate, as he was being termed out from the State House. He lost the Republican primary for the State Senate by a nearly 2-to-1 margin, with the loss being attributed to his resistance to overturning the 2020 presidential election. In spite of the loss, Bowers said he had no regrets about his resistance and "would [have done] it again in a heartbeat".

== Personal life ==
Bowers is married to Donetta Russell, with whom he has had seven children. Bowers is a painter and rancher. He is a classically trained artist specializing in watercolor, oil painting, and sculpting, and he has also been involved in the construction and education industries.

In 2021, Bowers's property was deeply affected by a fire that ravaged his farm, and burnt his painting studio where much of his work, as well as a significant portion of his legislative papers, were stored.

In late January 2021, Bowers announced the death of his daughter, Kacey Rae Bowers at 42, who had been fighting hepatic cancer for a "long period of time." Her last weeks were troubled by the presence of Trump supporters, one armed, demonstrating noisily outside Bowers' home.

== Electoral history ==
=== 2022 ===
2022 Republican primary election for Arizona State Senate District 10
Party	Candidate	Votes	%	±%
Republican	David Farnsworth	23,494	64.9	
Republican	Russell Bowers	12,705	35.1	
Total votes		36,199	100.0	

=== 2020 ===
2020 general election for Arizona House of Representatives District 25 (2 seats)
Party	Candidate	Votes	%	±%
Republican	Michelle Udall (incumbent)	69,049	38.7	
Republican	Russell Bowers (incumbent)	63,412	35.5	
Democratic	Suzanne Hug	46,180	25.9	
Total votes		178,641	100.0	

=== 2018 ===
2018 Republican primary election for Arizona House of Representatives District 25 (2 seats)
Party	Candidate	Votes	%	±%
Republican	Russell Bowers (incumbent)	20,522	43.3	
Republican	Michelle Udall (incumbent)	17,759	37.5	
Republican	Marlene Hinton	9,081	19.2	
Total votes		47,362	100.0	

2018 general election for Arizona House of Representatives District 25 (2 seats)
Party	Candidate	Votes	%	±%
Republican	Michelle Udall (incumbent)	52,075	39.8	
Republican	Russell Bowers (incumbent)	47,067	36.0	
Democratic	Johnny Martin	31,540	24.1	
Total votes		130,682	100.0	

=== 2016 ===
2016 Republican primary election for Arizona House of Representatives District 25 (2 seats)
Party	Candidate	Votes	%	±%
Republican	Russell Bowers (incumbent)	16,997	40.05	
Republican	Michelle Udall	14,045	33.10	
Republican	Ross Groen	11,396	26.85	
Total votes		42,438	100.0	

2016 general election for Arizona House of Representatives District 25 (2 seats)
Party	Candidate	Votes	%	±%
Republican	Michelle Udall	55,941	40.15	
Republican	Russell Bowers (incumbent)	51,160	36.72	
Democratic	Kathleen Rahn	32,225	23.13	
Total votes		139,326	100.0	

=== 2014 ===
2014 Republican primary election for Arizona House of Representatives District 25 (2 seats)
Party	Candidate	Votes	%	±%
Republican	Justin Olson (incumbent)	15,907	33.7	
Republican	Russell Bowers	13,158	27.9	
Republican	Michelle Udall	12,332	26.1	
Republican	Haydee Dawson	2,978	6.3	
Republican	Jerry Walker	2,812	6.0	
Total votes		47,187	100.0	

2014 general election for Arizona House of Representatives District 25 (2 seats)
Party	Candidate	Votes	%	±%
Republican	Justin Olson (incumbent)	34,451	34.0	
Republican	Russell Bowers	33,220	32.8	
Democratic	David Butler	15,145	14.9	
Democratic	Sheila Ogea	14,866	14.7	
Libertarian	Michael Kielsky	3,661	3.6	
Total votes		101,343	100.0	

== Awards ==
- Presidential Citizens Medal, 2023

Arizona House of Representatives
Preceded by Stan Barnes	Member of the Arizona House of Representatives from the 21st district 1993–1997; Served alongside: Leslie Whiting Johnson, Marilyn Jarrett	Succeeded by Dean Cooley
Preceded by Justin Pierce	Member of the Arizona House of Representatives from the 25th district 2015–2023; Served alongside: Michelle Udall	Succeeded by Michael Carbone
Arizona Senate
Preceded by Stan Barnes	Member of the Arizona Senate from the 21st district 1997–2003	Succeeded by Jay Tibshraeny
Political offices
Preceded by J. D. Mesnard	Speaker of the Arizona House of Representatives; 2019–2023	Succeeded by Ben Toma
