= Joanne Osborne =

American politician

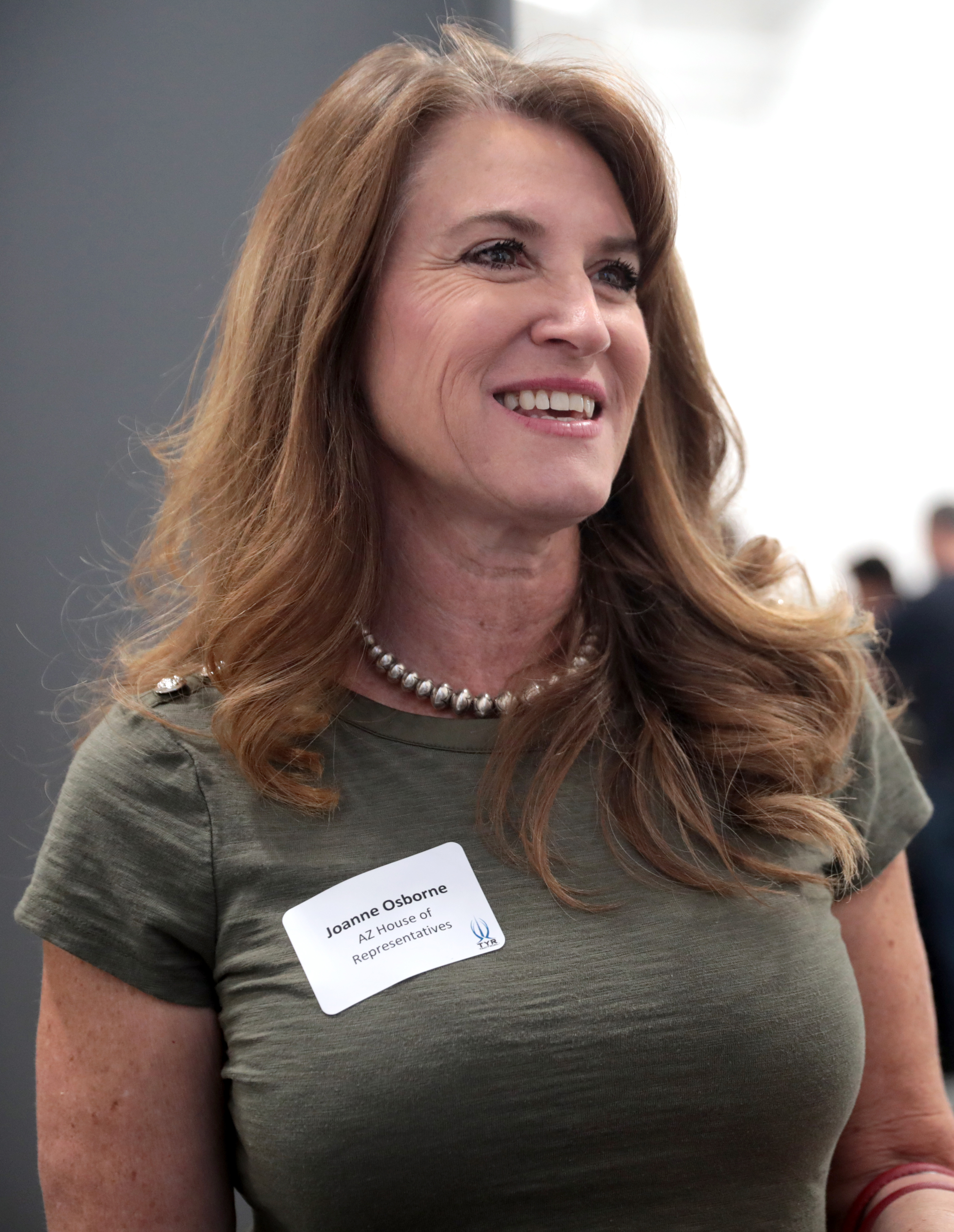
- Osborne in 2021

Member of the Arizona House of Representatives from the 13th district
- In office January 14, 2019 – January 9, 2023 Serving with Tim Dunn
- Preceded by: Darin Mitchell
- Succeeded by: Jennifer Pawlik

Personal details
- Party: Republican

Joanne Osborne is an American politician and a former Republican member of the Arizona House of Representatives representing District 13 from 2019 to 2023. Osborne was elected in 2018 defeating Republican incumbent state representative Darin Mitchell in the Republican primary.

Osborne is a native of Goodyear, Arizona, and served on the Goodyear City Council for 10 years, in addition to serving as the vice mayor of Goodyear from 2011 to 2013. She was also a member of Goodyear's planning and zoning commission.
