= Stephanie Stahl Hamilton =

Arizona state representative

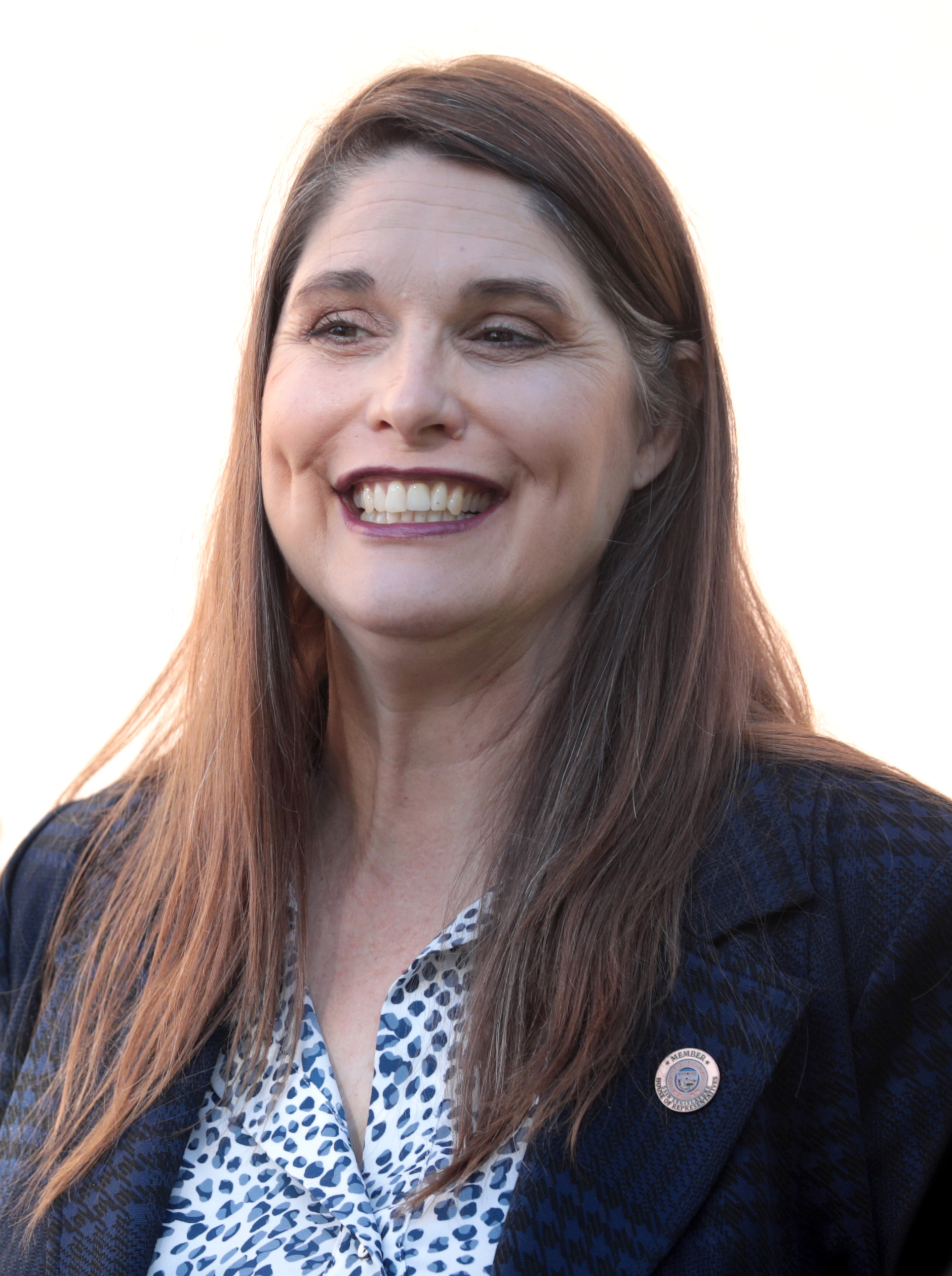
- Hamilton in 2023

Member of the Arizona House of Representatives
- Incumbent
- Assumed office January 9, 2023 Serving with Consuelo Hernandez
- Preceded by: Beverly Pingerelli
- Succeeded by: Miranda Lopez (elect)
- Constituency: 21st district
- In office January 11, 2021 – October 19, 2021 Serving with Domingo DeGrazia
- Preceded by: Kirsten Engel
- Succeeded by: Morgan Abraham
- Constituency: 10th district

Member of the Arizona Senate from the 10th district
- In office October 19, 2021 – January 9, 2023
- Preceded by: Kirsten Engel
- Succeeded by: Dave Farnsworth

Personal details
- Party: Democratic
- Education: Eastern Nazarene College (BA); Princeton Theological Seminary (MDiv)

Stephanie Stahl Hamilton is an American politician and Presbyterian minister serving as a member of the Arizona House of Representatives for the 21st district. She was previously appointed to the Arizona Senate for the 10th district, and also served as a member of the Arizona House of Representatives from January to October 2021 for the 10th district.

== Education ==
Hamilton graduated from Delmar High School in Delmar, Delaware, where her father was the principal. She then attended Eastern Nazarene College in Quincy, Massachusetts, where she received her Bachelor of Arts in Christian education in 1990. She later attended Princeton Theological Seminary, where she received her Master of Divinity in 2003.

== Career ==
Stephanie worked for Flagstaff Federated Community Church as the director of Christian Education and Youth Ministry.

She later went on to work at St. Mark's Presbyterian Church, PCUSA as the director of youth ministry in 2004. From 2009 to 2014, Hamilton worked at the Montlure Presbyterian Church Camp as the executive director. She has also served on multiple community-led organizations. She served on the Pima County Interfaith Council and on the TUSD Parent Advocacy Council, with her focus on the Family Life Curriculum. In 2018, Hamilton worked on the Save Our Schools campaign as the regional lead for Southern Arizona.

In October 2021, members of the Pima County Board of Supervisors appointed Stahl Hamilton to succeed Kirsten Engel in the Arizona Senate.

== Arizona State House of Representatives ==
In the August 2020 primary, Hamilton ran for the 10th legislative district of the Arizona State House of Representatives. Hamilton and incumbent Domingo DeGrazia won the two seats, beating out candidate Paul Stapleton Smith. Stephanie Stahl Hamilton and Domingo DeGrazia won the general election, defeating Republican opponents, Mabelle Gummere and Michael Hicks.

=== Bible disappearances ===
Early in 2023, officials in the Arizona House of Representatives noticed that two Bibles had been relocated from their normal position within the House's members-only lounge. Security personnel placed hidden cameras within the lounge area, and Stahl-Hamilton was spotted on footage taking the Bibles and hiding them underneath seat cushions in the lounge and in a refrigerator. Stahl-Hamilton was confronted by a CBS 5 Arizona reporter about the incident, but declined to comment, and instead walked away. She did make an apology on the House floor a day later.
