= Ben Toma =

American politician (born 1979)

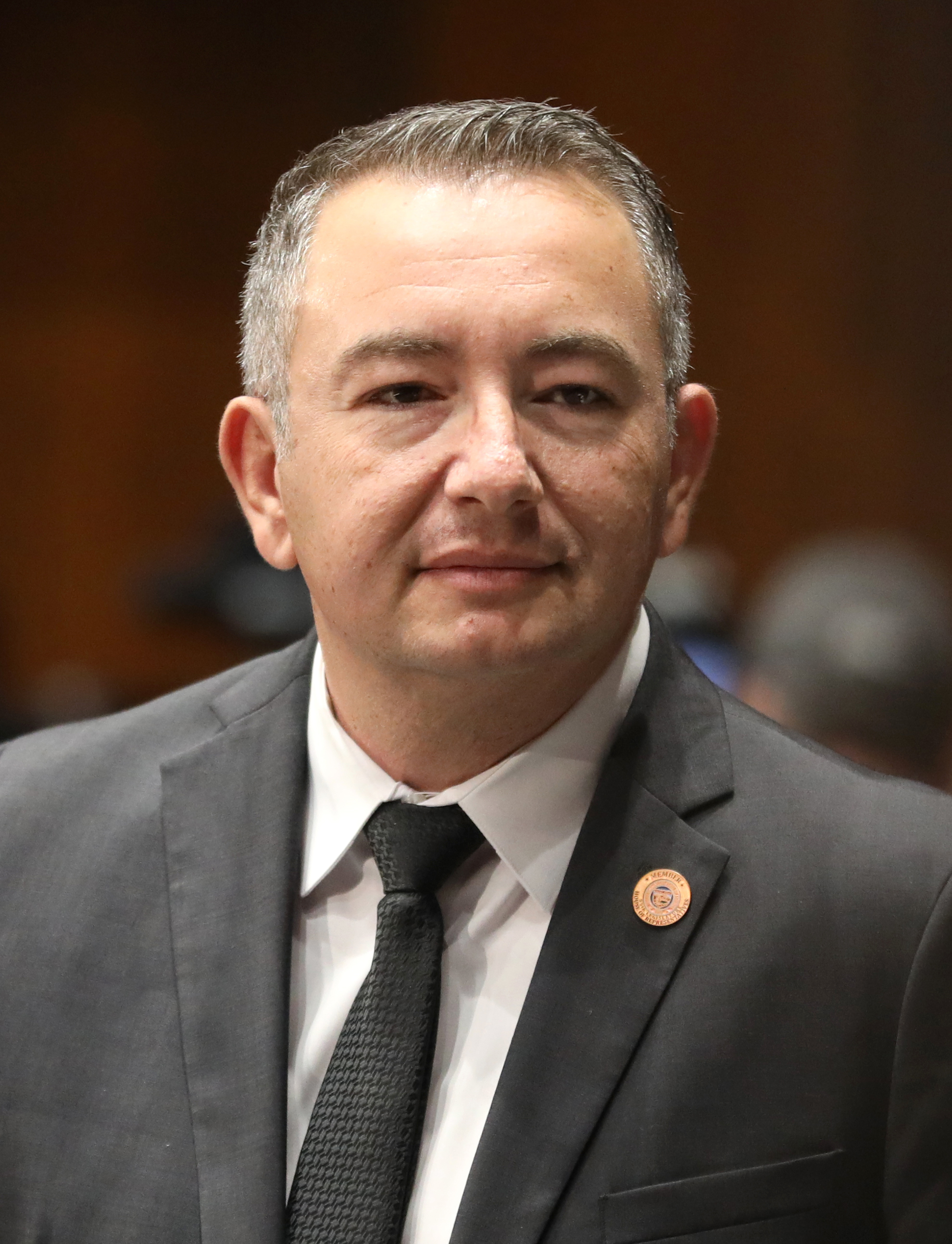
- Toma in 2024

55th Speaker of the Arizona House of Representatives
- In office January 9, 2023 – January 13, 2025
- Preceded by: Russell Bowers
- Succeeded by: Steve Montenegro

Member of the Arizona House of Representatives from the 27th district
- In office January 9, 2023 – January 13, 2025 Serving with Kevin Payne
- Preceded by: Phil Lovas
- Succeeded by: Tony Rivero

Majority Leader of the Arizona House of Representatives
- In office January 11, 2021 – January 9, 2023
- Preceded by: Warren Petersen
- Succeeded by: Leo Biasiucci

Member of the Arizona House of Representatives from the 22nd district
- In office April 26, 2017 – January 9, 2023 Serving with Kevin Payne
- Preceded by: Phil Lovas
- Succeeded by: Leezah Sun

Personal details
- Born: 1979 (age 46–47) Cluj-Napoca, Romania
- Party: Republican
- Education: Portland State University; Arizona State University, West (BA)

Benjamin Cornel Toma (born 1979) is a Romanian-American politician who served as a member of the Arizona House of Representatives for the 27th district. Elected in November 2016, he assumed office in January 2017. He was selected to be Speaker of the House in 2022, taking office in 2023. From 2021 to 2023, Toma served as majority leader of the Arizona House.

== Career ==
Toma is a real estate broker. He was appointed on a 5–1 vote to serve as a member of the Peoria, Arizona, city council in June 2014, when Cathy Carlat resigned to run for mayor. However, Toma was defeated in the special election in 2014. He lost again in 2016.

=== Arizona House of Representatives ===
In April 2017, the Maricopa County Board of Supervisors appointed Toma to fill a vacant seat in the Arizona House of Representatives representing the 22nd legislative district, to replace Phil Lovas, who resigned to accept a federal appointment with the Small Business Administration. The Board selected Toma from a list of three nominees put forward by the Republican precinct committeemen. The district includes parts of Peoria, Glendale, Surprise and Sun City West. Toma took his seat in the final days of 53rd Legislature, and was subsequently elected to a full term in the 2018 elections.

In February 2019, Arizona Governor Doug Ducey vetoed a plan, supported by state legislators of his own Republican Party, for across-the-board cuts in the individual state income tax. Toma, as chair of the House Ways and Means Committee, was an outspoken supporter of the tax-cut plan and an avowed opponent of tax increases. Ducey, Toma and other Arizona Republicans subsequently agreed upon a $11.9 billion state budget deal that included $386 million in offsets to tax hikes, angering some Arizona schoolteachers who were supporting higher taxes to increase funding for public schools. Toma had previously voted for historic salary increases for Arizona K-12 teachers, and has voted for increased teacher pay since. In 2021, Toma, as House majority leader, was the key architect of the largest tax cut package in state history, as well as a separate bill that shielded high-earners from a 3.5% tax surcharge for education that had been approved by voters in the November 2020 election (Proposition 208). The package, brokered between Ducey and Republican legislators, passed on a party-line vote. Toma initially proposed a flat tax, but was unable to garner enough votes to pass it after a single House Republican joined with all Democrats in opposing it. A modified version of the flat tax was passed 3 weeks later and has now been fully implemented. Toma defended the plan's focus on tax cuts for high-earning taxpayers, contending that "They're the ones that tend to make the jobs and create the economic conditions that lead to economic improvement for the entire state."

In 2022, Toma wrote and led passage of the nation's largest school choice expansion. Corey DeAngelis, a senior fellow at the American Federation for Children, called the bill's passage "the biggest school choice victory in U.S. history... Families will be able to take state funded education dollars to any education provider that meets their student's curricular needs whether that be public, private, or a home-based educational option."

In 2023, Toma was elected by his peers as the Speaker of the Arizona House of Representatives, becoming the highest ranking American politician of Romanian heritage.

==== Anti-abortion ====
In 2024, Toma blocked a vote on repealing Arizona's 1864 anti-abortion law, saying "the last thing we should be doing today is rushing a bill through the legislative process to repeal a law that has been enacted and reaffirmed by the legislature several times". He also had earlier confirmed the authenticity of a document with "ideas drafted for internal discussion and consideration within the caucus" in order to defeat a citizens' ballot proposal on abortion.

=== 2024 Congressional campaign ===
In 2024, Toma announced that he would seek the seat of retiring Congresswoman Debbie Lesko in Arizona's 8th congressional district, however Toma lost the Republican primary to Abraham Hamadeh, placing third.

== Personal life ==
Toma's family escaped communist Romania after being threatened by the secret police in 1986. After living in Portland, Oregon for a time, Toma eventually settled in Arizona where he met his wife Ani while in high school. The couple now has five daughters.

Arizona House of Representatives
Preceded by Warren Petersen	Majority Leader of the Arizona House of Representatives; 2021–2023	Succeeded by Leo Biasiucci
Political offices
Preceded by Russell Bowers	Speaker of the Arizona House of Representatives; 2023–2025	Succeeded by Steve Montenegro
