= Arizona's 29th legislative district =

American legislative district

- Map of District 29: Approved January 21, 2022
- Senator: Janae Shamp (R)
- House members: Steve Montenegro (R); James Taylor (R)
- Registration: 40.53% Republican; 24.01% Democratic; 33.77% Other
- Demographics: 58% White; 7% Black/African American; 2% Native American; 4% Asian; 27% Hispanic
- Population: 240,102
- Voting-age population: 182,717
- Registered voters: 142,701

Arizona's 29th legislative district is one of 30 in the state, consisting of a section of Maricopa County. As of 2023, there are 47 precincts in the district, all in Maricopa, with a total registered voter population of 142,701. The district has an overall population of 240,102.

Following the 2020 United States redistricting cycle, the Arizona Independent Redistricting Commission (AIRC) redrew legislative district boundaries in Arizona. According to the AIRC, the district is outside of competitive range and considered leaning Republican.

== Political representation ==
The district is represented in the 57th Arizona State Legislature, which convenes from January 1, 2025, to December 31, 2026, by Janae Shamp (R-Surprise) in the Arizona Senate and by James Taylor (R) and Steve Montenegro (R-Surprise) in the Arizona House of Representatives.

Name	Image	Residence	Office	Party
Janae Shamp		Surprise	State senator	Republican
James Taylor			State representative	Republican
Steve Montenegro		Surprise	State representative	Republican

== Elections ==
The 2022 elections were the first in the newly drawn district.

=== Arizona Senate ===
2026 Arizona's 29th Senate district election
Party	Candidate	Votes	%
Republican	Janae Shamp	Pending	Pending
Democratic	Eric Stafford	Pending	Pending
Total votes		Pending	Pending

2024 Arizona's 29th Senate district election
Party	Candidate	Votes	%
Republican	Janae Shamp	70,924	59.3
Democratic	Eric Stafford	48,608	40.7
Total votes		119,532	100

2022 Arizona's 29th Senate district election
Party	Candidate	Votes	%
Republican	Janae Shamp	51,466	58.97
Democratic	David Raymer	35,812	41.03
Total votes		87,278	100

=== Arizona House of Representatives ===
2026 Arizona House of Representatives election, 29th district
Party	Candidate	Votes	%
Republican	Steve Montenegro	Pending	Pending
Republican	James Taylor	Pending	Pending
Democratic	Christine Scianna	Pending	Pending
Total votes		Pending	Pending

2024 Arizona House of Representatives election, 29th district
Party	Candidate	Votes	%
Republican	Steve Montenegro	66,301	30.3
Republican	James Taylor	65,431	29.9
Democratic	Tanairi Ochoa-Martinez	44,776	20.4
Democratic	Thomas Tzitzura	42,535	19.4
Total votes		219,043	100

2022 Arizona House of Representatives election, 29th district
Party	Candidate	Votes	%
Republican	Steve Montenegro	46,831	36.41
Republican	Austin Smith	45,636	35.48
Democratic	Scott Podeyn	36,162	28.11
Total votes		128,629	100.00

== See also ==
- List of Arizona legislative districts
- Arizona State Legislature
