= Paul Mosley =

American politician

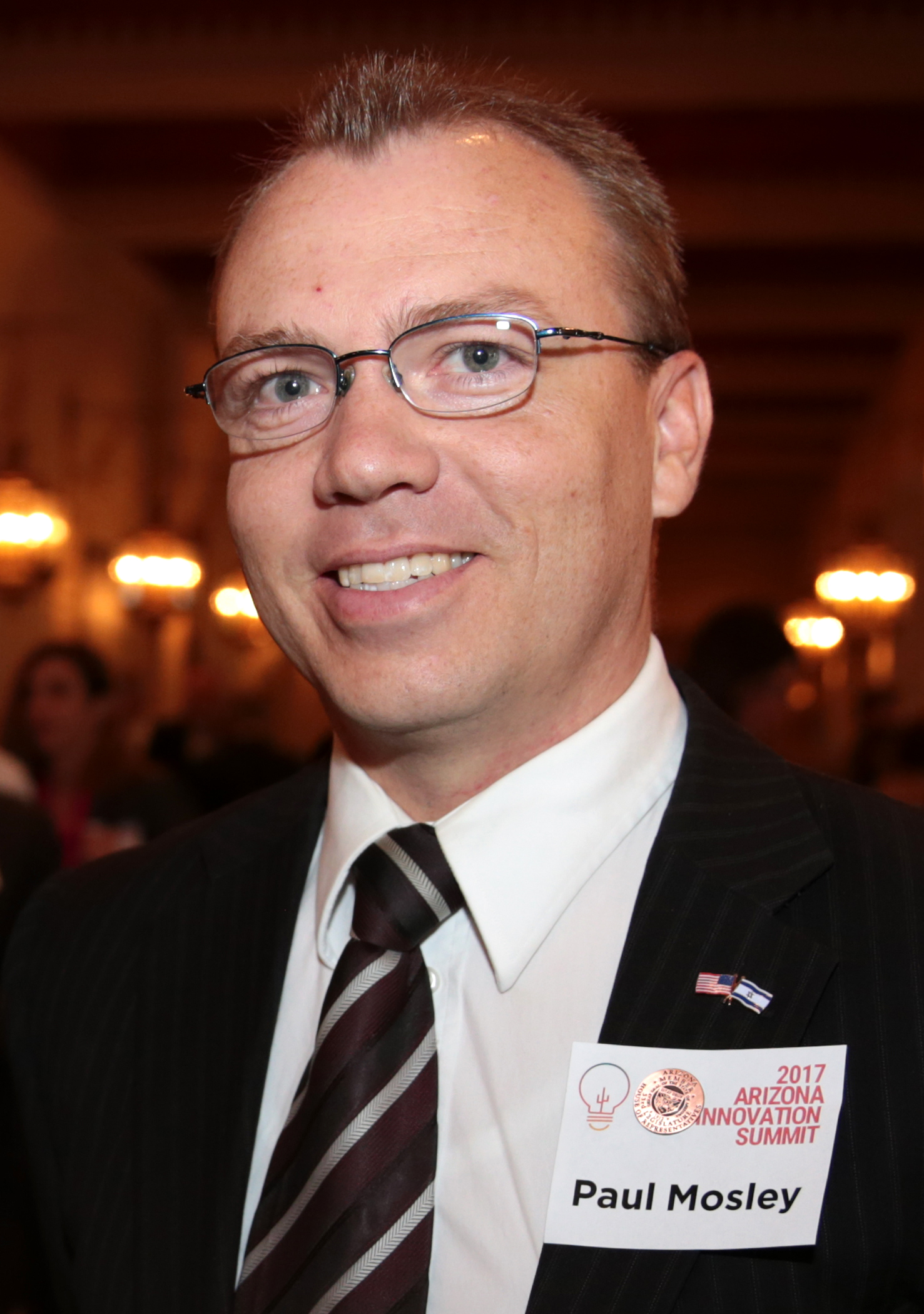
- Mosley in 2017.

Member of the Arizona House of Representatives from the 5th district
- In office January 9, 2017 – January 14, 2019 Serving with Regina Cobb
- Preceded by: Sonny Borrelli
- Succeeded by: Leo Biasiucci

Personal details
- Party: Republican

Paul Mosley is an American Republican politician and a former member of the Arizona House of Representatives elected to represent District 5 in 2016 through 2019.

== Education ==
Mosley graduated from Brigham Young University with a financial services degree in 2006.

== Political career ==
In 2016, Mosley and incumbent Regina Cobb defeated Sam Medrano and Jennifer Jones in the Republican primary for District 5 of the Arizona House of Representatives. Mosley and Cobb went on to defeat Democrat Beth Weisser and Leo Biasiucci of the Green Party in the general election.

In 2017, Mosley announced that he wanted to abolish compulsory education for children in Arizona, on the grounds that "education is still a privilege".

=== Speeding controversy ===
In March 2018, Mosley was pulled over for driving 97 miles per hour (156 km/h) in a 55-mile-per-hour (89 km/h) zone. He told the police officer that because of his "immunity as a government official" he should be let go, and bragged about speeding in the past at up to 140 miles per hour (230 km/h). In July 2018 the body cam footage was released to the public. Mosley later apologized on Facebook.

Doug Ducey (R), the governor of Arizona, called for an end to legislative immunity based on Mosley's behavior.

== Re-election bid ==
In August 2018, Mosley and Cobb were challenged in the Republican primary by Leo Biasiucci, a businessman who ran as a Green Party candidate in 2012, and Jennifer Jones-Esposito, first vice chair of the La Paz County Republican Committee. Mosley came third behind Cobb and Biasiucci and was eliminated from standing for a second term in the general election.

== Personal ==
Mosley and his wife Brynley have seven children, all born between 2007 and 2017.
