= 1970 Arizona Senate election =

- November 3, 1970

All 30 seats of the Arizona Senate 16 seats needed for a majority
	Majority party	Minority party
Party	Republican	Democratic
Seats before	17	13
Seats after	18	12
Seat change	▲1	▼1
Senate President before election
William S. (Bill) Porter
Republican
Elected Senate President
William C. Jacquin
Republican

The 1970 Arizona Senate election was held on November 3, 1970. Voters elected all 30 members of the Arizona Senate to serve two-year terms. The 1970 election ushered in the restructuring of the Arizona Legislature to its current format. There are 30 electoral districts across the state, each district electing a single state senator and two state representatives.

Primary elections were held on September 8, 1970.

Prior to the elections, the Republicans held a majority of 17 seats over the 13 seats held by Democrats.

Following the election, Republicans maintained control of the chamber and expanded their majority to 18 Republicans to 12 Democrats, a net gain of one seat for Republicans.

The newly elected senators served in the 30th Arizona State Legislature.

== Retiring Incumbents ==
=== Democrats ===
1. District 3: Frank L. Crosby

=== Republicans ===
1. District 7-E: Kenneth C. Cardella
2. District 8-A: James F. Holley
3. District 8-L: Christopher T. "Chris" Johnson
4. District 8-M: Terry Jones
5. District 8-O: Dan Halacy

== Incumbents Defeated in Primary Elections ==
=== Democrats ===
1. District 3: William "Bill" Huso
2. District 8: James A. "Jim" Elliott (Note: Redistricted from district 2 to 8.)

=== Republican ===
1. District 19: Bob Wilcox (Note: Redistricted from district 8-J to 19.)
2. District 23: Somers White (Note: Redistricted from district 8-I to 23.)
3. District 25: Mike Farren (Note: Redistricted from district 8-F to 25.)
4. District 30: William S. (Bill) Porter (Note: Redistricted from district 8-B to 30.)

== Summary of Results by Arizona State Legislative District ==
Old District	Incumbent	Party	New District	Elected Senator	Outcome
1st	Boyd Tenney	Rep	1st	Boyd Tenney	Rep Hold
2nd	James A. "Jim" Elliott	Dem	2nd	Thomas M. "Tommy" Knoles Jr. (Note: Redistricted from district 4 to 2.)	Dem Hold
2nd	James F. McNulty Jr. (Note: Redistricted from district 2 to 9.)	Dem	2nd	Thomas M. "Tommy" Knoles Jr.	Dem Hold
3rd	William "Bill" Huso	Dem	3rd	Roy Palmer	Rep Gain
3rd	Frank L. Crosby	Dem	3rd	Roy Palmer	Rep Gain
4th	Thomas M. "Tommy" Knoles Jr.	Dem	4th	John W. McLaughlin	Dem Hold
5th	E. B. "Blodie" Thode (Note: Redistricted from district 5 to 6.)	Dem	5th	Harold C. Giss (Note: Redistricted from district 6 to 5.)	Dem Hold
5th	A. V. "Bill" Hardt (Note: Redistricted from district 5 to 7.)	Dem	5th	Harold C. Giss	Dem Hold
6th	Harold C. Giss	Dem	6th	E. B. "Blodie" Thode	Dem Hold
7-A	Joe Castillo (Note: Redistricted from district 7-A to 10.)	Dem	7th	A. V. "Bill" Hardt	Dem Hold
7-B	F. T. "Limie" Gibbings (Note: Redistricted from district 7-B to 11.)	Dem	8th	Charles Awalt	Dem Hold
7-C	Sam Lena (Note: Redistricted from district 7-C to 12.)	Dem	9th	James F. McNulty Jr.	Dem Hold
7-D	Douglas S. Holsclaw (Note: Redistricted from district 7-D to 13.)	Rep	10th	Joe Castillo	Dem Gain
7-E	Kenneth C. Cardella	Rep	11th	F. T. "Limie" Gibbings	Dem Gain
7-F	William C. Jacquin (Note: Redistricted from district 7-F to 15.)	Rep	12th	Sam Lena	Dem Gain
8-A	James F. Holley	Rep	13th	Douglas S. Holsclaw	Rep Hold
8-B	William S. (Bill) Porter	Rep	14th	Scott Alexander	Rep Hold
8-C	John B. Conlan (Note: Redistricted from district 8-C to 21.)	Rep	15th	William C. Jacquin	Rep Hold
8-D	David B. Kret (Note: Redistricted from district 8-D to 26.)	Rep	16th	Fred Koory Jr.	Rep Hold
8-E	Sandra Day O'Connor (Note: The Maricopa County Board of Supervisors appointed Sandra Day O'Connor to fill the unexpired term of Isabel Burgess, who resigned. O'Connor was administered the oath of office on October 30, 1969.) (Note: Redistricted from district 8-E to 20.)	Rep	17th	Ray A. Goetze (Note: Redistricted from district 8-K to 17.)	Rep Hold
8-F	Mike Farren	Rep	18th	Joe Shaughnessy Jr.	Rep Hold
8-G	Cloves C. Campbell (Note: Redistricted from district 8-G to 28.)	Dem	19th	Ray Rottas	Rep Gain
8-H	Howard S. Baldwin (Note: The Maricopa County Board of Supervisors appointed Howard S. Baldwin to fill the unexpired term of Orme Lewis Jr., who resigned. Baldwin was administered the oath of office on May 5, 1969.) (Note: Redistricted from district 8-H to 24.)	Rep	20th	Sandra Day O'Connor	Rep Hold
8-I	Somers White	Rep	21st	John B. Conlan	Rep Hold
8-J	Bob Wilcox	Rep	22nd	Bess B. Stinson	Rep Hold
8-K	Ray A. Goetze	Rep	23rd	Leo Corbet	Rep Hold
8-L	Christopher T. "Chris" Johnson	Rep	24th	Howard S. Baldwin	Rep Hold
8-M	Terry Jones	Rep	25th	Trudy Camping	Rep Hold
8-N	Bob Stump (Note: Redistricted from district 8-N to 27.)	Dem	26th	David B. Kret	Rep Gain
8-O	Dan Halacy	Rep	27th	Bob Stump	Dem Gain
New Seat			28th	Cloves C. Campbell	Dem Gain
New Seat			29th	James A. Mack	Rep Gain
New Seat			30th	D. Delos Ellsworth	Rep Gain

== Detailed Results ==
=== District 1 ===
Democratic primary results
Party	Candidate	Votes	%
Democratic	Howard D. Jorgenson	2,537	54.06%
Democratic	A. H. (Hank) Bisjak	2,156	45.94%
Total votes		4,693	100.00%

Republican primary results
Party	Candidate	Votes	%
Republican	Boyd Tenney (incumbent)	3,712	100.00%
Total votes		3,712	100.00%

General election results
Party	Candidate	Votes	%
Republican	Boyd Tenney (incumbent)	11,089	62.83%
Democratic	Howard D. Jorgenson	6,561	37.17%
Total votes		17,650	100.00%
Republican hold			

=== District 2 ===
Democratic primary results
Party	Candidate	Votes	%
Democratic	Thomas M. (Tommy) Knoles Jr. (incumbent)	2,405	100.00%
Total votes		2,405	100.00%

Republican primary results
Party	Candidate	Votes	%
Republican	Walter D. Bennett	1,385	100.00%
Total votes		1,385	100.00%

General election results
Party	Candidate	Votes	%
Democratic	Thomas M. (Tommy) Knoles Jr. (incumbent)	5,443	59.87%
Republican	Walter D. Bennett	3,649	40.13%
Total votes		9,092	100.00%
Democratic hold			

=== District 3 ===
Democratic primary results
Party	Candidate	Votes	%
Democratic	Bus Mead	1,532	36.26%
Democratic	William "Bill" Huso (incumbent)	1,136	26.89%
Democratic	Glenn Blansett	982	23.24%
Democratic	Ronnie Lupe	575	13.61%
Total votes		4,225	100.00%

Republican primary results
Party	Candidate	Votes	%
Republican	Roy Palmer	1,204	100.00%
Total votes		1,204	100.00%

General election results
Party	Candidate	Votes	%
Republican	Roy Palmer	4,540	54.08%
Democratic	Bus Mead	3,855	45.92%
Total votes		8,395	100.00%
Republican gain from Democratic			

=== District 4 ===
Democratic primary results
Party	Candidate	Votes	%
Democratic	John W. (Mac) McLaughlin	2,698	61.60%
Democratic	Darwin D. Grant	1,682	38.40%
Total votes		4,380	100.00%

General election results
Party	Candidate	Votes	%
Democratic	John W. (Mac) McLaughlin	5,516	100.00%
Total votes		5,516	100.00%
Democratic hold			

=== District 5 ===
Democratic primary results
Party	Candidate	Votes	%
Democratic	Harold C. Giss (incumbent)	4,598	100.00%
Total votes		4,598	100.00%

General election results
Party	Candidate	Votes	%
Democratic	Harold C. Giss (incumbent)	7,753	100.00%
Total votes		7,753	100.00%
Democratic hold			

=== District 6 ===
Democratic primary results
Party	Candidate	Votes	%
Democratic	E. B. "Blodie" Thode (incumbent)	3,437	100.00%
Total votes		3,437	100.00%

Republican primary results
Party	Candidate	Votes	%
Republican	James Mumme	1,536	100.00%
Total votes		1,536	100.00%

General election results
Party	Candidate	Votes	%
Democratic	E. B. "Blodie" Thode (incumbent)	5,411	54.62%
Republican	James Mumme	4,495	45.38%
Total votes		9,906	100.00%
Democratic hold			

=== District 7 ===
Democratic primary results
Party	Candidate	Votes	%
Democratic	A. V. "Bill" Hardt (incumbent)	5,274	65.35%
Democratic	Edna E. Vaughn	2,796	34.65%
Total votes		8,070	100.00%

General election results
Party	Candidate	Votes	%
Democratic	A. V. "Bill" Hardt (incumbent)	9,792	100.00%
Total votes		9,792	100.00%
Democratic hold			

=== District 8 ===
Democratic primary results
Party	Candidate	Votes	%
Democratic	Charles Awalt	3,708	53.93%
Democratic	James A. "Jim" Elliott (incumbent)	3,168	46.07%
Total votes		6,876	100.00%

Republican primary results
Party	Candidate	Votes	%
Republican	Rush DeZonia	1,288	100.00%
Total votes		1,288	100.00%

General election results
Party	Candidate	Votes	%
Democratic	Charles Awalt	7,928	69.24%
Republican	Rush DeZonia	3,522	30.76%
Total votes		11,450	100.00%
Democratic hold			

=== District 9 ===
Democratic primary results
Party	Candidate	Votes	%
Democratic	James F. McNulty Jr. (incumbent)	3,794	67.41%
Democratic	Tom C. Hargis	1,834	32.59%
Total votes		5,628	100.00%

General election results
Party	Candidate	Votes	%
Democratic	James F. McNulty Jr. (incumbent)	8,629	100.00%
Total votes		8,629	100.00%
Democratic hold			

=== District 10 ===
Democratic primary results
Party	Candidate	Votes	%
Democratic	Joe Castillo (incumbent)	4,526	100.00%
Total votes		4,526	100.00%

General election results
Party	Candidate	Votes	%
Democratic	Joe Castillo (incumbent)	10,238	100.00%
Total votes		10,238	100.00%
Democratic gain from Republican			

=== District 11 ===
Democratic primary results
Party	Candidate	Votes	%
Democratic	F. T. "Limie" Gibbings (incumbent)	2,143	55.29%
Democratic	Douglas Risner	1,733	44.71%
Total votes		3,876	100.00%

General election results
Party	Candidate	Votes	%
Democratic	F. T. "Limie" Gibbings (incumbent)	9,376	100.00%
Total votes		9,376	100.00%
Democratic gain from Republican			

=== District 12 ===
Democratic primary results
Party	Candidate	Votes	%
Democratic	Sam Lena (incumbent)	3,585	100.00%
Total votes		3,585	100.00%

General election results
Party	Candidate	Votes	%
Democratic	Sam Lena (incumbent)	10,397	100.00%
Total votes		10,397	100.00%
Democratic gain from Republican			

=== District 13 ===
Republican primary results
Party	Candidate	Votes	%
Republican	Douglas S. Holsclaw (incumbent)	2,473	100.00%
Total votes		2,473	100.00%

General election results
Party	Candidate	Votes	%
Republican	Douglas S. Holsclaw (incumbent)	11,525	100.00%
Total votes		11,525	100.00%
Republican hold			

=== District 14 ===
Republican primary results
Party	Candidate	Votes	%
Republican	Scott Alexander	2,143	100.00%
Total votes		2,143	100.00%

General election results
Party	Candidate	Votes	%
Republican	Scott Alexander	9,550	85.71%
American Independent	Anthony D. Bogden	1,592	14.29%
Total votes		11,142	100.00%
Republican hold			

=== District 15 ===
Republican primary results
Party	Candidate	Votes	%
Republican	William C. Jacquin (incumbent)	2,987	100.00%
Total votes		2,987	100.00%

General election results
Party	Candidate	Votes	%
Republican	William C. Jacquin (incumbent)	12,496	100.00%
Total votes		12,496	100.00%
Republican hold			

=== District 16 ===
Democratic primary results
Party	Candidate	Votes	%
Democratic	Lyle W. King	2,190	62.45%
Democratic	John A. Fresco	1,317	37.55%
Total votes		3,507	100.00%

Republican primary results
Party	Candidate	Votes	%
Republican	Fred Koory Jr.	3,466	100.00%
Total votes		3,466	100.00%

General election results
Party	Candidate	Votes	%
Republican	Fred Koory Jr.	9,561	61.61%
Democratic	Lyle W. King	5,958	38.39%
Total votes		15,519	100.00%
Republican hold			

=== District 17 ===
Democratic primary results
Party	Candidate	Votes	%
Democratic	Donald G. Knox	2,039	100.00%
Total votes		2,039	100.00%

Republican primary results
Party	Candidate	Votes	%
Republican	Ray A. Goetze (incumbent)	3,313	70.41%
Republican	Fred M. Wilson	1,392	29.59%
Total votes		4,705	100.00%

General election results
Party	Candidate	Votes	%
Republican	Ray A. Goetze (incumbent)	11,239	64.36%
Democratic	Donald G. Knox	6,224	35.64%
Total votes		17,463	100.00%
Republican hold			

=== District 18 ===
Democratic primary results
Party	Candidate	Votes	%
Democratic	Ray Johnson	2,943	100.00%
Total votes		2,943	100.00%

Republican primary results
Party	Candidate	Votes	%
Republican	Joe Shaughnessy Jr.	1,610	50.68%
Republican	M. C. (Mack) Plummer	1,567	49.32%
Total votes		3,177	100.00%

General election results
Party	Candidate	Votes	%
Republican	Joe Shaughnessy Jr.	8,370	55.19%
Democratic	Ray Johnson	6,797	44.81%
Total votes		15,167	100.00%
Republican hold			

=== District 19 ===
Democratic primary results
Party	Candidate	Votes	%
Democratic	Richard Wilks	2,364	100.00%
Total votes		2,364	100.00%

Republican primary results
Party	Candidate	Votes	%
Republican	Ray Rottas	2,735	64.37%
Republican	Bob Wilcox (incumbent)	1,514	35.63%
Total votes		4,249	100.00%

General election results
Party	Candidate	Votes	%
Republican	Ray Rottas	9,766	65.65%
Democratic	Richard Wilks	5,109	34.35%
Total votes		14,875	100.00%
Republican gain from Democratic			

=== District 20 ===
Democratic primary results
Party	Candidate	Votes	%
Democratic	Daniel F. Langenwalter	2,114	100.00%
Total votes		2,114	100.00%

Republican primary results
Party	Candidate	Votes	%
Republican	Sandra Day O'Connor (incumbent)	3,884	100.00%
Total votes		3,884	100.00%

General election results
Party	Candidate	Votes	%
Republican	Sandra Day O'Connor (incumbent)	12,223	100.00%
Total votes		12,223	100.00%
Republican hold			

=== District 21 ===
Democratic primary results
Party	Candidate	Votes	%
Democratic	Guy Stillman	1,919	100.00%
Total votes		1,919	100.00%

Republican primary results
Party	Candidate	Votes	%
Republican	John B. Conlan (incumbent)	3,140	58.14%
Republican	Floyd A. McCracken	2,261	41.86%
Total votes		5,401	100.00%

General election results
Party	Candidate	Votes	%
Republican	John B. Conlan (incumbent)	8,999	56.74%
Democratic	Guy Stillman	6,860	43.26%
Total votes		15,859	100.00%
Republican hold			

=== District 22 ===
Democratic primary results
Party	Candidate	Votes	%
Democratic	James F. (Jim) Dooley	3,182	100.00%
Total votes		3,182	100.00%

Republican primary results
Party	Candidate	Votes	%
Republican	Bess B. Stinson	2,577	100.00%
Total votes		2,577	100.00%

General election results
Party	Candidate	Votes	%
Republican	Bess B. Stinson	7,738	52.78%
Democratic	James F. (Jim) Dooley	6,922	47.22%
Total votes		14,660	100.00%
Republican hold			

=== District 23 ===
Democratic primary results
Party	Candidate	Votes	%
Democratic	Mildred Hagerty	2,406	100.00%
Total votes		2,406	100.00%

Republican primary results
Party	Candidate	Votes	%
Republican	Leo Corbet	2,695	62.00%
Republican	Somers White (incumbent)	1,652	38.00%
Total votes		4,347	100.00%

General election results
Party	Candidate	Votes	%
Republican	Leo Corbet	9,621	64.63%
Democratic	Mildred Hagerty	5,265	35.37%
Total votes		14,886	100.00%
Republican hold			

=== District 24 ===
Democratic primary results
Party	Candidate	Votes	%
Democratic	Ruth McGregor	2,822	100.00%
Total votes		2,822	100.00%

Republican primary results
Party	Candidate	Votes	%
Republican	Howard S. Baldwin (incumbent)	1,811	54.60%
Republican	Jim Phipps	713	21.50%
Republican	Mary Lincoln	481	14.50%
Republican	Clifton Phillips	312	9.41%
Total votes		3,317	100.00%

General election results
Party	Candidate	Votes	%
Republican	Howard S. Baldwin (incumbent)	7,897	59.33%
Democratic	Ruth McGregor	5,414	40.67%
Total votes		13,311	100.00%
Republican hold			

=== District 25 ===
Democratic primary results
Party	Candidate	Votes	%
Democratic	Archie C. Ryan	1,556	40.85%
Democratic	Art McBrayer	1,192	31.29%
Democratic	Nick Kennedy	1,061	27.86%
Total votes		3,809	100.00%

Republican primary results
Party	Candidate	Votes	%
Republican	Trudy Camping	1,690	60.97%
Republican	Mike Farren (incumbent)	1,082	39.03%
Total votes		2,772	100.00%

General election results
Party	Candidate	Votes	%
Republican	Trudy Camping	7,422	54.82%
Democratic	Archie C. Ryan	6,116	45.18%
Total votes		13,538	100.00%
Republican hold			

=== District 26 ===
Democratic primary results
Party	Candidate	Votes	%
Democratic	John V. Riggs	2,446	100.00%
Total votes		2,446	100.00%

Republican primary results
Party	Candidate	Votes	%
Republican	David B. Kret (incumbent)	2,667	100.00%
Total votes		2,667	100.00%

General election results
Party	Candidate	Votes	%
Republican	David B. Kret (incumbent)	7,309	52.35%
Democratic	John V. Riggs	6,654	47.65%
Total votes		13,963	100.00%
Republican gain from Democratic			

=== District 27 ===
Democratic primary results
Party	Candidate	Votes	%
Democratic	Bob Stump (incumbent)	3,721	100.00%
Total votes		3,721	100.00%

General election results
Party	Candidate	Votes	%
Democratic	Bob Stump (incumbent)	9,042	100.00%
Total votes		9,042	100.00%
Democratic gain from Republican			

=== District 28 ===
Democratic primary results
Party	Candidate	Votes	%
Democratic	Cloves C. Campbell (incumbent)	2,731	55.76%
Democratic	Tony Abril	1,930	39.40%
Democratic	Christina Lechuga	237	4.84%
Total votes		4,898	100.00%

General election results
Party	Candidate	Votes	%
Democratic	Cloves C. Campbell (incumbent)	9,071	100.00%
Total votes		9,071	100.00%
Democratic gain from Republican			

=== District 29 ===
Democratic primary results
Party	Candidate	Votes	%
Democratic	Richard S. Berry	3,505	100.00%
Total votes		3,505	100.00%

Republican primary results
Party	Candidate	Votes	%
Republican	James A. (Jim) Mack	2,612	64.62%
Republican	Walter E. Bloom	1,430	35.38%
Total votes		4,042	100.00%

General election results
Party	Candidate	Votes	%
Republican	James A. (Jim) Mack	8,919	56.14%
Democratic	Richard S. Berry	6,968	43.86%
Total votes		15,887	100.00%
Republican gain from Democratic			

=== District 30 ===
Republican primary results
Party	Candidate	Votes	%
Republican	D. Delos Ellsworth	2,735	50.88%
Republican	William S. "Bill" Porter (incumbent)	2,640	49.12%
Total votes		5,375	100.00%

General election results
Party	Candidate	Votes	%
Republican	D. Delos Ellsworth	12,053	100.00%
Total votes		12,053	100.00%
Republican gain from Democratic			
