= Leo Biasiucci =

American politician

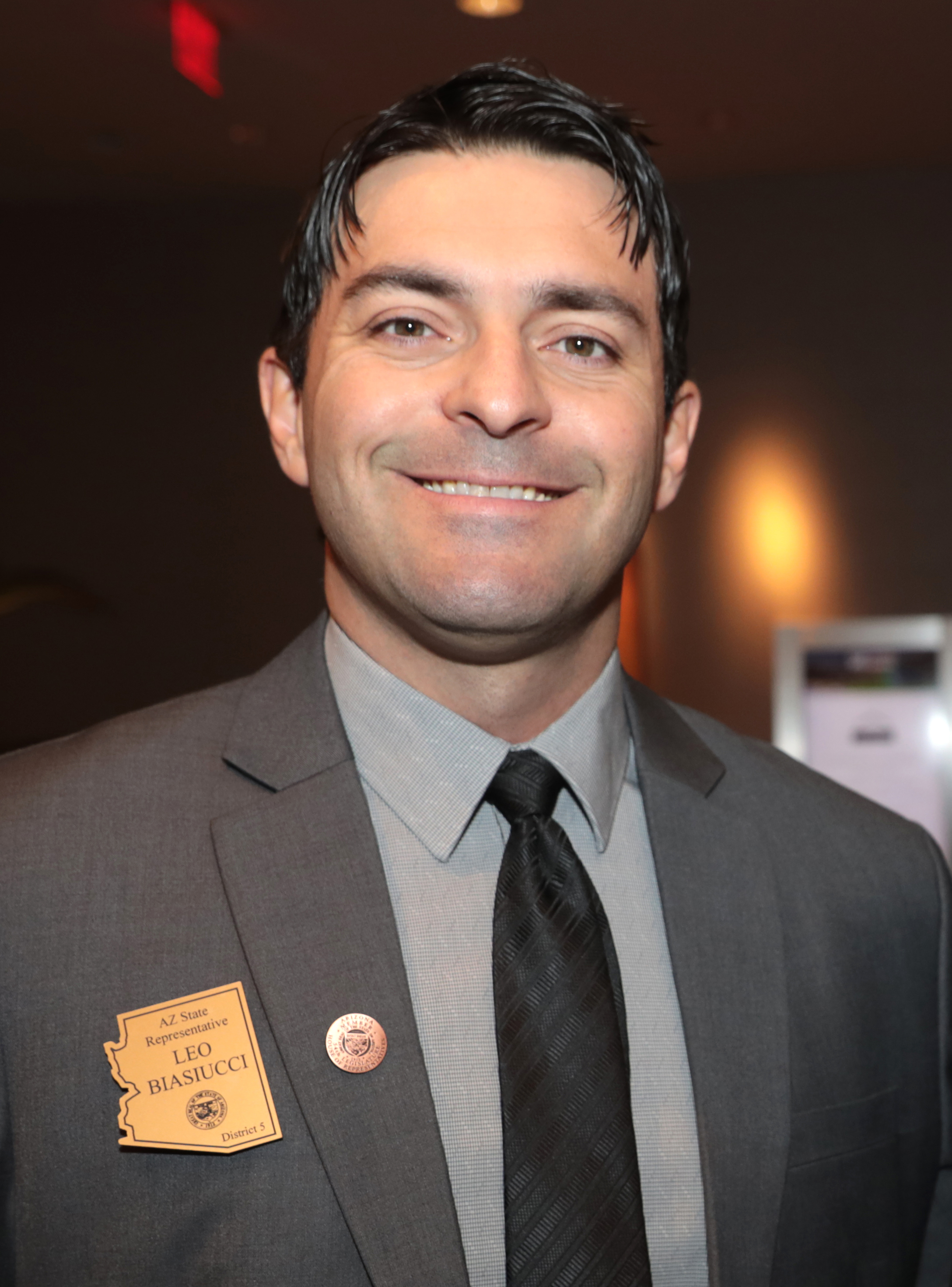
- Biasiucci in 2019

Majority Leader of the Arizona House of Representatives
- In office January 9, 2023 – January 13, 2025
- Preceded by: Ben Toma
- Succeeded by: Michael Carbone

Member of the Arizona House of Representatives
- Incumbent
- Assumed office January 14, 2019 Serving with Regina Cobb (2019–2023); John Gillette (2023–present)
- Preceded by: Paul Mosley
- Succeeded by: David Rose (elect)
- Constituency: 5th district (2019–2023); 30th district (2023–present)

Personal details
- Born: Lake Havasu City, Arizona, U.S.
- Party: Green (2016); Republican (2016–present)
- Education: University of Arizona Eller (BS) University of Arizona Law (MLS)

Leo Biasiucci is an American politician and a current Republican member of the Arizona House of Representatives representing District 30 since 2023. He previously represented District 5 in the Arizona House of Representatives from 2019 to 2023, before redistricting. Leo Biasiucci was elected in 2018 to succeed embattled State Representative Paul Mosley. Leo Biasiucci defeated Mosley in the Republican primary, and went on to win the general election in November 2018.

In 2016, Biasiucci ran for the Arizona House as a progressive Green Party candidate. Two years later he explained to a reporter that he "didn't understand where his beliefs were" in relation to political parties before he switched to the Republican Party in 2016. He said he still holds the non-partisan position that we all need to 'protect the planet.'

Leo Biasiucci attended the University of Arizona and worked for companies such as General Electric and Geico. He has worked for his family's business, the Mohave Traffic Survival School.

In 2024, Biasiucci sponsored legislation to make it easier to build housing in Arizona. The bill would ban cities and towns from forcing homeowners into homeowners associations (HOAs), and ban cities with a larger population than 70,000 from regulating the size of lots for single-family homes.

Arizona House of Representatives
Preceded by Ben Toma	Majority Leader of the Arizona House of Representatives; 2023–2025	Succeeded by Michael Carbone
