= Eldon Rudd =

FBI agent, politician, US Marine Corps officer (1920–2002)

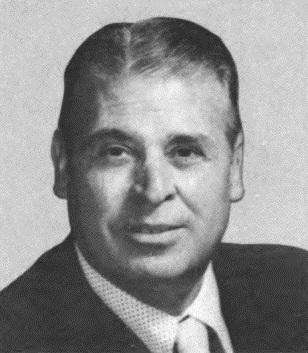
- Official portrait, 1977

Member of the U.S. House of Representatives from Arizona's 4th district
- In office January 3, 1977 – January 3, 1987
- Preceded by: John Bertrand Conlan
- Succeeded by: Jon Kyl

Personal details
- Born: July 15, 1920 Camp Verde, Arizona
- Died: February 8, 2002 (aged 81) Scottsdale, Arizona
- Resting place: National Memorial Cemetery of Arizona
- Party: Republican
- Education: Arizona State College (BA); University of Arizona (JD)
- Profession: lawyer, politician

Military service
- Allegiance: United States
- Branch/service: United States Marine Corps
- Years of service: 1942–1946

Eldon Dean Rudd (July 15, 1920 – February 8, 2002) was a U.S. Republican politician.

== Early life ==
Rudd was born in Camp Verde, Arizona. A 1939 graduate of Clarkdale High School in Clarkdale, Arizona, he enlisted in the United States Marine Corps in 1942 and served as a fighter pilot during World War II. After his discharge in 1946, he attended Arizona State College, from which he graduated in 1947, and the University of Arizona Law School in Tucson.

== Years in FBI ==
After a brief period in private practice, Rudd became a special agent for the FBI in 1950. As the only FBI field agent in Washington, D.C., fluent in Spanish in 1954, Rudd participated in the interrogation of the Puerto Rican nationalists involved in the attack on the US House of Representatives that year. His report impressed Director J. Edgar Hoover, who offered Rudd his next choice of assignment, which he received as U.S. legal attaché at the U.S. Embassy in Mexico City, where he served from 1960 to 1970.

When assassin Lee Harvey Oswald shot and killed President John F. Kennedy in Dallas, Texas, on November 22, 1963, Rudd was ordered by Hoover to collect from the Mexican government their law enforcement and intelligence files on Lee Harvey Oswald, including files relating to Oswald's connections to the pro-Fidel Castro Fair Play for Cuba Committee, Oswald's several trips to and from Cuba, and his arrest in Mexico City. Rudd obtained Oswald's file from the Mexican government and flew a Cessna aircraft from Mexico City to Dallas, Texas, to provide the documents to FBI officials in Dallas as Kennedy's body was on its way to Washington, D.C., with Vice President Lyndon B. Johnson and widow Jacqueline Kennedy.

== Political career ==
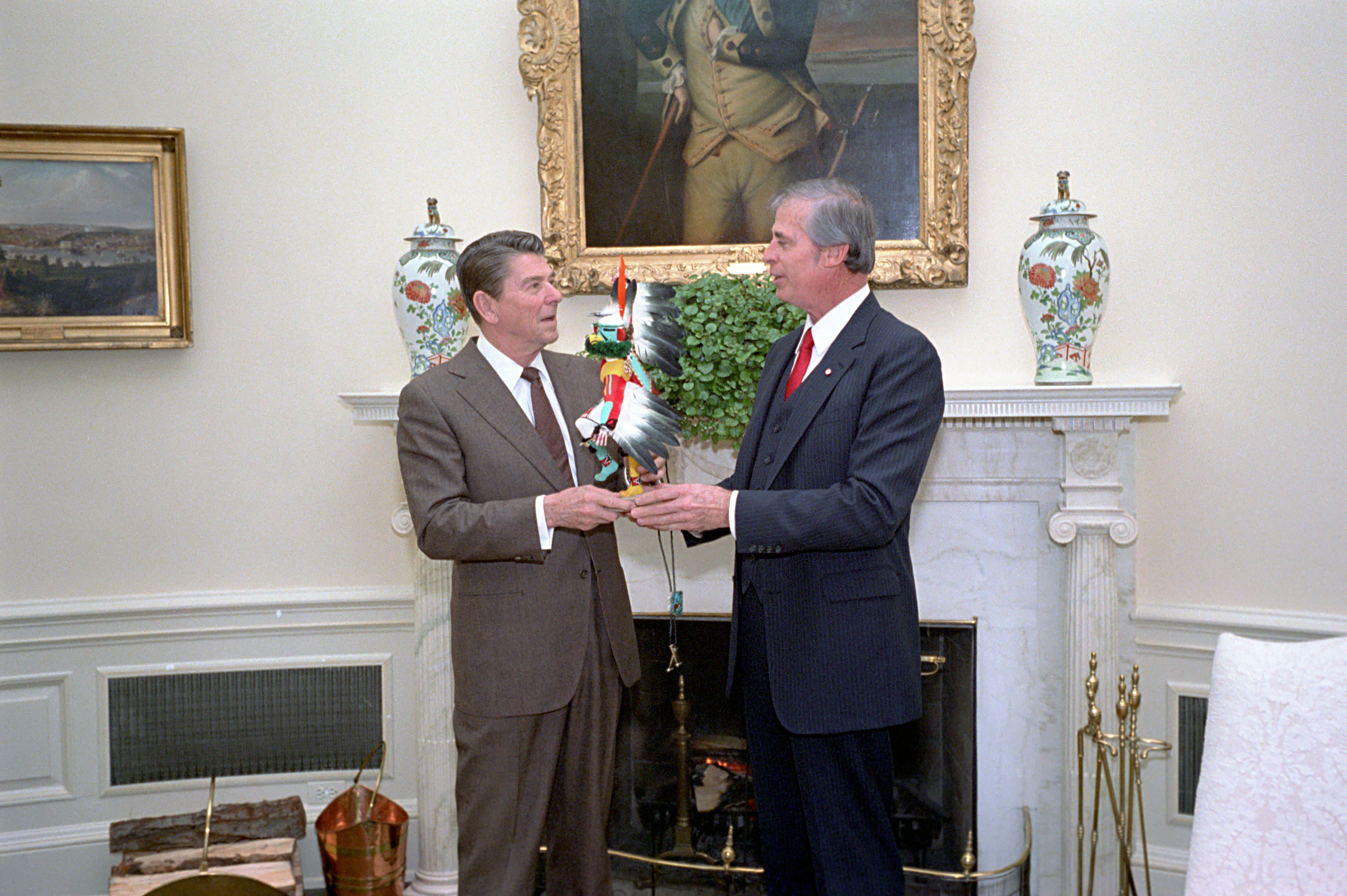
Rudd with President Ronald Reagan in 1982

After leaving the FBI in 1970, Rudd moved to Arizona, where he became involved in politics. He was elected to the board of supervisors for Maricopa County in 1972. Four years later, he won election to the House of Representatives for Arizona's 4th congressional district, which then comprised the entire northeastern portion of the state. However, the bulk of its population was in the northern portion of the Valley of the Sun.

He defeated Democrat Tony Mason by only 707 votes. While Mason carried four of the district's five counties, he could not overcome a 17,100-vote deficit in the district's share of Maricopa County, which had more people than the rest of the district combined. He was easily re-elected four times, each time with more than 60 percent of the vote, and in 1984, he was completely unopposed.

Rudd was a fiscal conservative, and a member of the important Appropriations Committee for five years; he opposed the expenditure of federal taxpayer dollars for abortions.

A staunch anticommunist, Rudd was a tireless supporter of US anticommunist efforts in Central and South America, and he was the last American to visit with Nicaraguan President Anastasio Somoza Debayle, who was killed by Sandinista forces.

During the 1980 presidential election, Rudd, with help from FBI colleagues with access to security officials at the White House, allegedly obtained debate preparation documents prepared for President Jimmy Carter for his election debates against Republican nominee Ronald Reagan and provided the so-called "Carter debate papers" to the Reagan presidential campaign in the Debategate scandal.

== Later years ==
Rudd retired from Congress in 1987 and took a position with the Salt River Project. Remaining active in Republican politics, he served as campaign manager for Doug Wead during Wead's unsuccessful 1992 run for Arizona's 6th congressional district. Rudd died in Scottsdale, Arizona; his remains were cremated, with the ashes interred in the National Memorial Cemetery of Arizona.

U.S. House of Representatives
Preceded by John Bertrand Conlan	Member of the U.S. House of Representatives from Arizona's 4th congressional district 1977–1987	Succeeded by Jon Kyl
