= 1974 Arizona House of Representatives election =

1974 Arizona House of Representatives elections
- November 5, 1974

All 60 seats in the Arizona House 31 seats needed for a majority
	Majority party	Minority party
Leader	Stanley W. Akers	Craig E. Davids
Party	Republican	Democratic
Leader's seat	19th	7th
Last election	38	22
Seats after	33	27
Seat change	▼5	▲5
Speaker before election
Stanley W. Akers
Republican
Elected Speaker
Stanley W. Akers
Republican

The 1974 Arizona House of Representatives elections were held on November 5, 1974. Voters elected all 60 members of the Arizona House of Representatives in multi-member districts to serve a two-year term. The elections coincided with the elections for other offices, including governor, U.S. Senate, U.S. House, and state senate. Primary elections were held on September 10, 1974.

Prior to the elections, the Republicans held a majority of 38 seats over the Democrats' 22 seats.

Following the elections, Republicans maintained control of the chamber, though their majority was reduced to 33 Republicans to 27 Democrats, a net gain of five seats for Democrats.

The newly elected members served in the 32nd Arizona State Legislature, during which Republican Stanley W. Akers was re-elected as speaker of the Arizona House. (Note: Akers was elected as speaker for the 32nd legislature, defeating Representative Davids, who was also nominated for speaker. The vote tally for speaker was: Akers-33 votes to Davids-27 votes.)

== Summary of results by Arizona state legislative district ==
District	Incumbent	Party	Elected representative	Outcome
1st	Gladys Gardner	Rep	John Hays	Rep hold
1st	Ray Everett	Rep	Jim Thomas	Dem gain
2nd	Sam A. McConnell Jr.	Rep	Sam A. McConnell Jr.	Rep hold
2nd	John Wettaw	Rep	John Wettaw	Rep hold
3rd	Benjamin Hanley	Dem	Benjamin Hanley	Dem hold
3rd	Jack A. Brown	Dem	Daniel Peaches	Rep gain
4th	E. C. "Polly" Rosenbaum	Dem	E. C. "Polly" Rosenbaum	Dem hold
4th	Edward G. (Bunch) Guerrero	Dem	Edward G. (Bunch) Guerrero	Dem hold
5th	Elwood W. Bradford	Dem	Elwood W. Bradford	Dem hold
5th	Frank McElhaney (Note: Upon the resignation of Jones Osborn on April 27, 1973, Frank C. McElhaney was appointed as his replacement on May 4, 1973.)	Dem	D. J. "Jim" Phillips	Dem hold
6th	Polly Getzwiller	Dem	Polly Getzwiller	Dem hold
6th	G. T. "Tom" Alley	Dem	G. T. "Tom" Alley	Dem hold
7th	Craig E. Davids	Dem	Craig E. Davids	Dem hold
7th	Richard "Dick" Pacheco	Dem	Richard "Dick" Pacheco	Dem hold
8th	H. F. "Hank" Fenn	Dem	James A. (Jim) Elliott	Dem hold
8th	Ed C. Sawyer	Dem	Steve Vukcevich	Dem hold
9th	Tom Richey	Rep	Tom Richey (Note: Republican Tom Richey resigned on August 20, 1976, as representative from District 9. He was replaced by Thomas Morgan Jr. who was appointed by the Santa Cruz County Board of Supervisors on September 8, 1976, to fill the unexpired portion of Richey's term.)	Rep hold
9th	Jim Dewberry	Dem	Jim Dewberry	Dem hold
10th	Larry Bahill	Dem	Larry Bahill	Dem hold
10th	Carmen Cajero (Note: Upon the death of Bernardo M. "Nayo" Cajero on January 14, 1973, Carmen F. Cajero was appointed as his replacement on January 29, 1973.)	Dem	Carmen Cajero	Dem hold
11th	R. P. "Bob" Fricks	Dem	R. P. "Bob" Fricks	Dem hold
11th	Emilio Carrillo	Dem	Emilio Carrillo	Dem hold
12th	Thomas N. "Tom" Goodwin	Rep	Thomas N. "Tom" Goodwin	Rep hold
12th	Pete Hershberger	Rep	Jo Cauthorn	Dem gain
13th	Helen Grace Carlson	Dem	Bruce Wheeler	Dem hold
13th	H. Thomas (Tam) Kincaid	Rep	Sister Clare Dunn	Dem gain
14th	W. A. "Tony" Buehl	Rep	W. A. "Tony" Buehl	Rep hold
14th	Charles King	Rep	Anna J. Cullinan	Dem gain
15th	James B. Ratliff	Rep	James B. Ratliff	Rep hold
15th	J. Herbert Everett	Rep	J. Herbert Everett	Rep hold
16th	Don Stewart	Rep	Don Stewart	Rep hold
16th	Diane B. McCarthy	Rep	Diane B. McCarthy	Rep hold
17th	C. W. "Bill" Lewis	Rep	C. W. "Bill" Lewis	Rep hold
17th	Anne Lindeman	Rep	Anne Lindeman	Rep hold
18th	Burton S. Barr	Rep	Burton S. Barr	Rep hold
18th	Ruth Peck	Rep	Ruth Peck	Rep hold
19th	Tony West	Rep	Tony West	Rep hold
19th	Stan Akers	Rep	Stan Akers	Rep hold
20th	Bill McCune	Rep	Susan L. James	Dem gain
20th	Howard Adams	Rep	Gerald F. (Jerry) Moore	Dem gain
21st	Elizabeth Adams Rockwell	Rep	Elizabeth Adams Rockwell	Rep hold
21st	Jay C. Stuckey	Rep	Keith W. Hubbard	Rep hold
22nd	R. G. "Danny" Peña	Dem	R. G. "Danny" Peña	Dem hold
22nd	Art Hamilton	Dem	Art Hamilton	Dem hold
23rd	Leon Thompson	Dem	Leon Thompson	Dem hold
23rd	Tony R. Abril	Dem	Tony R. Abril	Dem hold
24th	Pete Corpstein	Rep	Pete Corpstein	Rep hold
24th	Richard Burgess	Rep	Cal Holman	Rep hold
25th	D. Lee Jones	Rep	D. Lee Jones	Rep hold
25th	Jim Skelly	Rep	Jim Skelly (Note: Republican Jim Skelly resigned on June 28, 1976, as representative from District 25, to run from another district, District 28. He was replaced by Jacque Steiner, who was appointed by the Maricopa County Board of Supervisors on July 6, 1976, to fill the unexpired portion of Skelly's term.)	Rep hold
26th	Frank Kelley	Rep	Frank Kelley	Rep hold
26th	Peter Kay	Rep	Peter Kay	Rep hold
27th	Juanita Harelson	Rep	Juanita Harelson	Rep hold
27th	Michael Goodwin	Rep	Richard O. (Dick) Flynn	Rep hold
28th	Americo "Mac" Carvalho	Rep	Americo "Mac" Carvalho	Rep hold
28th	Bob Hungerford	Rep	William E. "Bill" Rigel	Rep hold
29th	Jim Cooper	Rep	Jim Cooper	Rep hold
29th	Jack J. Taylor	Rep	Donna J. Carlson	Rep hold
30th	James J. Sossaman	Rep	James J. Sossaman	Rep hold
30th	Carl J. Kunasek	Rep	Carl J. Kunasek	Rep hold

== Detailed results ==
=== District 1 ===
Primary election results
Party	Candidate	Votes	%
Democratic Party primary results
Democratic	Jim Thomas	4,618	54.72%
Democratic	William "Bill" Pynchon	3,822	45.28%
Total votes		8,440	100.00%
Republican Party primary results
Republican	John Hays	4,607	41.56%
Republican	Ray Everett (incumbent)	3,282	29.60%
Republican	Al Crawford	3,197	28.84%
Total votes		11,086	100.00%

General election results
Party	Candidate	Votes	%
Republican	John Hays	13,069	29.47%
Democratic	Jim Thomas	11,302	25.48%
Republican	Ray Everett (incumbent)	11,017	24.84%
Democratic	William "Bill" Pynchon	8,961	20.21%
Total votes		44,349	100.00%
Republican hold			
Democratic gain from Republican			

=== District 2 ===
Primary election results
Party	Candidate	Votes	%
Democratic Party primary results
Democratic	Boyd A. Shumway	4,312	56.33%
Democratic	Leon Berger	3,343	43.67%
Total votes		7,655	100.00%
Republican Party primary results
Republican	Sam A. McConnell Jr. (incumbent)	3,334	52.09%
Republican	John Wettaw (incumbent)	3,066	47.91%
Total votes		6,400	100.00%

General election results
Party	Candidate	Votes	%
Republican	John Wettaw (incumbent)	10,066	27.57%
Republican	Sam A. McConnell Jr. (incumbent)	10,007	27.40%
Democratic	Boyd A. Shumway	8,448	23.13%
Democratic	Leon Berger	7,996	21.90%
Total votes		36,517	100.00%
Republican hold			
Republican hold			

=== District 3 ===
Primary election results
Party	Candidate	Votes	%
Democratic Party primary results
Democratic	Jack A. Brown (incumbent)	2,036	30.93%
Democratic	Benjamin Hanley (incumbent)	1,980	30.08%
Democratic	Joy Hanley	1,338	20.33%
Democratic	Graham Holmes	688	10.45%
Democratic	Rex I. Linville	541	8.22%
Total votes		6,583	100.00%
Republican Party primary results
Republican	Daniel Peaches	1,266	100.00%
Total votes		1,266	100.00%

General election results
Party	Candidate	Votes	%
Democratic	Benjamin Hanley (incumbent)	10,290	42.77%
Republican	Daniel Peaches	8,726	36.27%
Democratic	Jack A. Brown (incumbent)	5,042	20.96%
Total votes		24,058	100.00%
Democratic hold			
Republican gain from Democratic			

=== District 4 ===
Primary election results
Party	Candidate	Votes	%
Democratic Party primary results
Democratic	Edward G. (Bunch) Guerrero (incumbent)	7,174	52.30%
Democratic	E. C. (Polly) Rosenbaum (incumbent)	6,544	47.70%
Total votes		13,718	100.00%

General election results
Party	Candidate	Votes	%
Democratic	E. C. (Polly) Rosenbaum (incumbent)	11,755	51.44%
Democratic	Edward G. (Bunch) Guerrero (incumbent)	11,099	48.56%
Total votes		22,854	100.00%
Democratic hold			
Democratic hold			

=== District 5 ===
Primary election results
Party	Candidate	Votes	%
Democratic Party primary results
Democratic	Elwood W. Bradford (incumbent)	2,771	37.09%
Democratic	D. J. "Jim" Phillips	2,428	32.50%
Democratic	Frank McElhaney (incumbent)	2,272	30.41%
Total votes		7,471	100.00%
Republican Party primary results
Republican	Cushing "Cush" Lord	1,723	100.00%
Total votes		1,723	100.00%

General election results
Party	Candidate	Votes	%
Democratic	D. J. "Jim" Phillips	8,157	40.00%
Democratic	Elwood W. Bradford (incumbent)	7,194	35.28%
Republican	Cushing "Cush" Lord	5,039	24.71%
Total votes		20,390	100.00%
Democratic hold			
Democratic hold			

=== District 6 ===
Primary election results
Party	Candidate	Votes	%
Democratic Party primary results
Democratic	Polly Getzwiller (incumbent)	3,143	39.75%
Democratic	G. T. "Tom" Alley (incumbent)	1,956	24.74%
Democratic	Dorothy Leuser	1,943	24.58%
Democratic	Claude Pitrat	864	10.93%
Total votes		7,906	100.00%
Republican Party primary results
Republican	Jim Hartdegen	1,525	100.00%
Total votes		1,525	100.00%

General election results
Party	Candidate	Votes	%
Democratic	Polly Getzwiller (incumbent)	7,474	42.73%
Democratic	G. T. "Tom" Alley (incumbent)	5,456	31.19%
Republican	Jim Hartdegen	4,560	26.07%
Total votes		17,490	100.00%
Democratic hold			
Democratic hold			

=== District 7 ===
Primary election results
Party	Candidate	Votes	%
Democratic Party primary results
Democratic	Craig E. Davids (incumbent)	4,161	50.28%
Democratic	Richard "Dick" Pacheco (incumbent)	4,114	49.72%
Total votes		8,275	100.00%

General election results
Party	Candidate	Votes	%
Democratic	Craig E. Davids (incumbent)	9,560	52.51%
Democratic	Richard "Dick" Pacheco (incumbent)	8,647	47.49%
Total votes		18,207	100.00%
Democratic hold			
Democratic hold			

=== District 8 ===
Primary election results
Party	Candidate	Votes	%
Democratic Party primary results
Democratic	James A. (Jim) Elliott	3,890	25.01%
Democratic	Steve Vukcevich	3,311	21.29%
Democratic	Milo Miskovich	2,393	15.39%
Democratic	James H. "Jim" McCutchan	2,163	13.91%
Democratic	John W. (Mike) Bibb	1,740	11.19%
Democratic	John P. (Johnie) Sticht	1,034	6.65%
Democratic	Ed Borgnaes	1,021	6.57%
Total votes		15,552	100.00%
Republican Party primary results
Republican	Walter L. (Walt) Foster	2,183	100.00%
Total votes		2,183	100.00%

General election results
Party	Candidate	Votes	%
Democratic	James A. (Jim) Elliott	12,199	41.10%
Democratic	Steve Vukcevich	10,481	35.31%
Republican	Walter L. (Walt) Foster	7,004	23.60%
Total votes		29,684	100.00%
Democratic hold			
Democratic hold			

=== District 9 ===
Primary election results
Party	Candidate	Votes	%
Democratic Party primary results
Democratic	Jim Dewberry (incumbent)	2,335	35.58%
Democratic	Lloyd Vacovsky	1,953	29.76%
Democratic	"Mr. John" R. Humphreys Sr.	1,341	20.43%
Democratic	Gene Mondeau	934	14.23%
Total votes		6,563	100.00%
Republican Party primary results
Republican	Tom Richey (incumbent)	2,830	84.63%
Republican	Frank H. Dearden (Note: Was a write-in candidate in the primary election.)	514	15.37%
Total votes		3,344	100.00%

General election results
Party	Candidate	Votes	%
Democratic	Jim Dewberry (incumbent)	9,573	38.41%
Republican	Tom Richey (incumbent)	8,008	32.13%
Democratic	Lloyd Vacovsky	7,343	29.46%
Total votes		24,924	100.00%
Democratic hold			
Republican hold			

=== District 10 ===
Primary election results
Party	Candidate	Votes	%
Democratic Party primary results
Democratic	Carmen Cajero (incumbent)	2,895	43.62%
Democratic	Larry Bahill (incumbent)	2,175	32.77%
Democratic	"Cora" B. Esquibel	1,567	23.61%
Total votes		6,637	100.00%
Republican Party primary results
Republican	George H. Curtis	704	100.00%
Total votes		704	100.00%

General election results
Party	Candidate	Votes	%
Democratic	Carmen Cajero (incumbent)	7,662	43.06%
Democratic	Larry Bahill (incumbent)	7,559	42.48%
Republican	George H. Curtis	2,573	14.46%
Total votes		17,794	100.00%
Democratic hold			
Democratic hold			

=== District 11 ===
Primary election results
Party	Candidate	Votes	%
Democratic Party primary results
Democratic	Emilio Carrillo (incumbent)	2,457	26.99%
Democratic	R. P. "Bob" Fricks (incumbent)	1,961	21.54%
Democratic	Peter Goudinoff	1,563	17.17%
Democratic	Ernie Soto Navarro	1,395	15.33%
Democratic	Ida Ruth Davis	1,150	12.63%
Democratic	Joseph Sweeney	576	6.33%
Total votes		9,102	100.00%
Republican Party primary results
Republican	Charles (Chuck) Hill Knight Jr.	1,288	100.00%
Total votes		1,288	100.00%

General election results
Party	Candidate	Votes	%
Democratic	Emilio Carrillo (incumbent)	9,474	41.15%
Democratic	R. P. "Bob" Fricks (incumbent)	9,083	39.45%
Republican	Charles (Chuck) Hill Knight Jr.	4,466	19.40%
Total votes		23,023	100.00%
Democratic hold			
Democratic hold			

=== District 12 ===
Primary election results
Party	Candidate	Votes	%
Democratic Party primary results
Democratic	Jo Cauthorn	3,530	41.69%
Democratic	John Kromko	2,643	31.22%
Democratic	Martin Bedford	2,294	27.09%
Total votes		8,467	100.00%
Republican Party primary results
Republican	Thomas N. "Tom" Goodwin (incumbent)	3,473	52.97%
Republican	Pete Hershberger (incumbent)	3,084	47.03%
Total votes		6,557	100.00%

General election results
Party	Candidate	Votes	%
Democratic	Jo Cauthorn	11,246	27.37%
Republican	Thomas N. "Tom" Goodwin (incumbent)	10,262	24.97%
Republican	Pete Hershberger (incumbent)	9,933	24.17%
Democratic	John Kromko	9,651	23.49%
Total votes		41,092	100.00%
Democratic gain from Republican			
Republican hold			

=== District 13 ===
Primary election results
Party	Candidate	Votes	%
Democratic Party primary results
Democratic	Sister Clare Dunn	4,337	39.74%
Democratic	Bruce Wheeler	1,858	17.02%
Democratic	Bob Goodpaster	1,647	15.09%
Democratic	John Muir	1,148	10.52%
Democratic	Bill Dumes	975	8.93%
Democratic	Robert F. (Bob) Walmer	949	8.70%
Total votes		10,914	100.00%
Republican Party primary results
Republican	Stephen Thomas Beal	3,854	55.49%
Republican	Seth H. Linthicum	3,091	44.51%
Total votes		6,945	100.00%

General election results
Party	Candidate	Votes	%
Democratic	Sister Clare Dunn	12,390	29.93%
Democratic	Bruce Wheeler	11,180	27.01%
Republican	Stephen Thomas Beal	9,431	22.78%
Republican	Seth H. Linthicum	8,395	20.28%
Total votes		41,396	100.00%
Democratic hold			
Democratic gain from Republican			

=== District 14 ===
Primary election results
Party	Candidate	Votes	%
Democratic Party primary results
Democratic	Anna J. Cullinan	4,446	50.73%
Democratic	Sylvain Schnaittacher	2,404	27.43%
Democratic	Anthony R. "Tony" Spaletto	1,914	21.84%
Total votes		8,764	100.00%
Republican Party primary results
Republican	W. A. "Tony" Buehl (incumbent)	4,682	53.50%
Republican	A. S. "Skip" Donau	4,070	46.50%
Total votes		8,752	100.00%

General election results
Party	Candidate	Votes	%
Republican	W. A. "Tony" Buehl (incumbent)	12,993	27.61%
Democratic	Anna J. Cullinan	12,485	26.53%
Republican	A. S. "Skip" Donau	12,412	26.38%
Democratic	Sylvain Schnaittacher	9,164	19.48%
Total votes		47,054	100.00%
Republican hold			
Democratic gain from Republican			

=== District 15 ===
Primary election results
Party	Candidate	Votes	%
Democratic Party primary results
Democratic	Earl G. Rhodes	2,921	50.20%
Democratic	J. H. (Rod) Rodriguez	2,898	49.80%
Total votes		5,819	100.00%
Republican Party primary results
Republican	James B. Ratliff (incumbent)	5,173	50.91%
Republican	J. Herbert Everett (incumbent)	4,988	49.09%
Total votes		10,161	100.00%

General election results
Party	Candidate	Votes	%
Republican	James B. Ratliff (incumbent)	9,720	29.74%
Republican	J. Herbert Everett (incumbent)	9,602	29.38%
Democratic	Earl G. Rhodes	7,515	23.00%
Democratic	J. H. (Rod) Rodriguez	5,841	17.87%
Total votes		32,678	100.00%
Republican hold			
Republican hold			

=== District 16 ===
Primary election results
Party	Candidate	Votes	%
Democratic Party primary results
Democratic	S. J. Carlise	2,743	32.29%
Democratic	Jack DeVault	2,099	24.71%
Democratic	C. W. (Jock) DiGiacomo	1,909	22.47%
Democratic	Mike Kapski	1,743	20.52%
Total votes		8,494	100.00%
Republican Party primary results
Republican	Diane B. McCarthy (incumbent)	4,578	39.56%
Republican	Don Stewart (incumbent)	4,082	35.27%
Republican	Don Casper	1,653	14.28%
Republican	Edmund B. Carroll	1,260	10.89%
Total votes		11,573	100.00%

General election results
Party	Candidate	Votes	%
Republican	Diane B. McCarthy (incumbent)	12,288	29.60%
Republican	Don Stewart (incumbent)	11,476	27.64%
Democratic	S. J. Carlise	9,089	21.89%
Democratic	Jack DeVault	8,664	20.87%
Total votes		41,517	100.00%
Republican hold			
Republican hold			

=== District 17 ===
Primary election results
Party	Candidate	Votes	%
Democratic Party primary results
Democratic	Robert L. (Bob) Huffman	3,020	42.06%
Democratic	Dennis Serbick	2,165	30.15%
Democratic	Lew Singer	1,995	27.79%
Total votes		7,180	100.00%
Republican Party primary results
Republican	Anne Lindeman (incumbent)	5,994	41.83%
Republican	C. W. "Bill" Lewis (incumbent)	5,339	37.26%
Republican	Mary Singer	2,996	20.91%
Total votes		14,329	100.00%

General election results
Party	Candidate	Votes	%
Republican	Anne Lindeman (incumbent)	15,348	33.72%
Republican	C. W. "Bill" Lewis (incumbent)	13,842	30.41%
Democratic	Robert L. (Bob) Huffman	8,801	19.34%
Democratic	Dennis Serbick	7,520	16.52%
Total votes		45,511	100.00%
Republican hold			
Republican hold			

=== District 18 ===
Primary election results
Party	Candidate	Votes	%
Democratic Party primary results
Democratic	Phyllis G. Rowe	3,838	55.56%
Democratic	Russell J. Fons	3,070	44.44%
Total votes		6,908	100.00%
Republican Party primary results
Republican	Burton S. Barr (incumbent)	5,429	41.57%
Republican	Ruth Peck (incumbent)	4,313	33.03%
Republican	Joe Smith	3,317	25.40%
Total votes		13,059	100.00%

General election results
Party	Candidate	Votes	%
Republican	Burton S. Barr (incumbent)	11,259	30.27%
Republican	Ruth Peck (incumbent)	10,470	28.15%
Democratic	Phyllis G. Rowe	8,701	23.39%
Democratic	Russell J. Fons	6,769	18.20%
Total votes		37,199	100.00%
Republican hold			
Republican hold			

=== District 19 ===
Primary election results
Party	Candidate	Votes	%
Democratic Party primary results
Democratic	Jay O. Foley	3,546	52.64%
Democratic	Ron G. Sartor	3,190	47.36%
Total votes		6,736	100.00%
Republican Party primary results
Republican	Stan Akers (incumbent)	5,609	45.04%
Republican	Tony West (incumbent)	4,989	40.06%
Republican	Tom Sarbeck	1,855	14.90%
Total votes		12,453	100.00%

General election results
Party	Candidate	Votes	%
Republican	Stan Akers (incumbent)	10,653	29.63%
Republican	Tony West (incumbent)	9,828	27.33%
Democratic	Jay O. Foley	8,103	22.54%
Democratic	Ron G. Sartor	7,373	20.51%
Total votes		35,957	100.00%
Republican hold			
Republican hold			

=== District 20 ===
Primary election results
Party	Candidate	Votes	%
Democratic Party primary results
Democratic	Gerald F. (Jerry) Moore	1,924	22.96%
Democratic	Susan L. James	1,843	21.99%
Democratic	William Yaeger	1,832	21.86%
Democratic	John J. Walsh	1,284	15.32%
Democratic	Virginia Mardeusz	879	10.49%
Democratic	Albert E. Frantz Jr.	618	7.37%
Total votes		8,380	100.00%
Republican Party primary results
Republican	Howard Adams (incumbent)	2,670	40.79%
Republican	G. R. "Jerry" LeRoy	1,944	29.70%
Republican	Emmet C. O'Beirne	1,931	29.50%
Total votes		6,545	100.00%

General election results
Party	Candidate	Votes	%
Democratic	Susan L. James	7,612	27.03%
Democratic	Gerald F. (Jerry) Moore	7,536	26.76%
Republican	Howard Adams (incumbent)	6,868	24.38%
Republican	G. R. "Jerry" LeRoy	6,149	21.83%
Total votes		28,165	100.00%
Democratic gain from Republican			
Democratic gain from Republican			

=== District 21 ===
Primary election results
Party	Candidate	Votes	%
Democratic Party primary results
Democratic	Dr. Timona Pittman	2,455	36.61%
Democratic	Frank L. Ross	2,447	36.49%
Democratic	DuWayne Henrie	1,804	26.90%
Total votes		6,706	100.00%
Republican Party primary results
Republican	Elizabeth Adams Rockwell (incumbent)	3,618	40.42%
Republican	Keith W. Hubbard	2,773	30.98%
Republican	Maxine Provost Brubaker	1,454	16.25%
Republican	August P. Andersen	1,105	12.35%
Total votes		8,950	100.00%

General election results
Party	Candidate	Votes	%
Republican	Elizabeth Adams Rockwell (incumbent)	8,170	26.97%
Republican	Keith W. Hubbard	7,732	25.52%
Democratic	Dr. Timona Pittman	7,317	24.15%
Democratic	Frank L. Ross	7,073	23.35%
Total votes		30,292	100.00%
Republican hold			
Republican hold			

=== District 22 ===
Primary election results
Party	Candidate	Votes	%
Democratic Party primary results
Democratic	R. G. "Danny" Peña (incumbent)	2,521	33.53%
Democratic	Art Hamilton (incumbent)	2,175	28.93%
Democratic	Pete C. Barraza	1,998	26.58%
Democratic	R. W. (Duffy) Laidlaw	824	10.96%
Total votes		7,518	100.00%
Republican Party primary results
Republican	Marcelyn Mann	1,124	100.00%
Total votes		1,124	100.00%

General election results
Party	Candidate	Votes	%
Democratic	R. G. "Danny" Peña (incumbent)	6,204	40.32%
Democratic	Art Hamilton (incumbent)	6,140	39.91%
Republican	Marcelyn Mann	3,041	19.77%
Total votes		15,385	100.00%
Democratic hold			
Democratic hold			

=== District 23 ===
Primary election results
Party	Candidate	Votes	%
Democratic Party primary results
Democratic	Tony R. Abril (incumbent)	2,382	24.41%
Democratic	Leon Thompson (incumbent)	1,995	20.44%
Democratic	Virgil Woods	1,823	18.68%
Democratic	Bob Weathers	1,292	13.24%
Democratic	L. H. "Larry" Hatfield	1,117	11.45%
Democratic	Lester Knox	892	9.14%
Democratic	Bennie Joe Brown	258	2.64%
Total votes		9,759	100.00%

General election results
Party	Candidate	Votes	%
Democratic	Tony R. Abril (incumbent)	5,442	52.32%
Democratic	Leon Thompson (incumbent)	4,960	47.68%
Total votes		10,402	100.00%
Democratic hold			
Democratic hold			

=== District 24 ===
Primary election results
Party	Candidate	Votes	%
Democratic Party primary results
Democratic	James S. Bennett, III	2,756	36.50%
Democratic	Dave Bellmont	2,740	36.29%
Democratic	John Vermeire	2,055	27.21%
Total votes		7,551	100.00%
Republican Party primary results
Republican	Pete Corpstein (incumbent)	6,692	39.14%
Republican	Cal Holman	5,664	33.13%
Republican	Blaine Cooper	4,741	27.73%
Total votes		17,097	100.00%

General election results
Party	Candidate	Votes	%
Republican	Pete Corpstein (incumbent)	16,780	31.31%
Republican	Cal Holman	15,989	29.84%
Democratic	Dave Bellmont	10,453	19.51%
Democratic	James S. Bennett, III	10,364	19.34%
Total votes		53,586	100.00%
Republican hold			
Republican hold			

=== District 25 ===
Primary election results
Party	Candidate	Votes	%
Democratic Party primary results
Democratic	Gladys T. Verdugo	3,617	52.28%
Democratic	Louis L. Rhodes	3,301	47.72%
Total votes		6,918	100.00%
Republican Party primary results
Republican	Jim Skelly (incumbent)	3,392	50.61%
Republican	D. Lee Jones (incumbent)	3,310	49.39%
Total votes		6,702	100.00%

General election results
Party	Candidate	Votes	%
Republican	Jim Skelly (incumbent)	7,975	28.09%
Republican	D. Lee Jones (incumbent)	6,975	24.57%
Democratic	Gladys T. Verdugo	6,729	23.71%
Democratic	Louis L. Rhodes	6,707	23.63%
Total votes		28,386	100.00%
Republican hold			
Republican hold			

=== District 26 ===
Primary election results
Party	Candidate	Votes	%
Democratic Party primary results
Democratic	William E. Hegarty	3,248	54.62%
Democratic	Jay Gaskins	2,698	45.38%
Total votes		5,946	100.00%
Republican Party primary results
Republican	Frank Kelley (incumbent)	5,528	51.15%
Republican	Peter Kay (incumbent)	5,279	48.85%
Total votes		10,807	100.00%

General election results
Party	Candidate	Votes	%
Republican	Frank Kelley (incumbent)	10,065	28.60%
Republican	Peter Kay (incumbent)	9,939	28.24%
Democratic	William E. Hegarty	7,636	21.70%
Democratic	Jay Gaskins	6,282	17.85%
Independence-Liberty-Objectivity	Eric Shane	1,273	3.62%
Total votes		35,195	100.00%
Republican hold			
Republican hold			

=== District 27 ===
Primary election results
Party	Candidate	Votes	%
Democratic Party primary results
Democratic	Eliza M. Carney	3,589	39.71%
Democratic	Mario H. Esquer	2,970	32.86%
Democratic	L. Alton "Pat" Riggs	2,480	27.44%
Total votes		9,039	100.00%
Republican Party primary results
Republican	Juanita Harelson (incumbent)	4,699	44.38%
Republican	Richard O. (Dick) Flynn	3,833	36.20%
Republican	Douglas Martin	2,055	19.41%
Total votes		10,587	100.00%

General election results
Party	Candidate	Votes	%
Republican	Juanita Harelson (incumbent)	12,756	29.85%
Republican	Richard O. (Dick) Flynn	10,666	24.96%
Democratic	Eliza M. Carney	9,990	23.38%
Democratic	Mario H. Esquer	9,322	21.81%
Total votes		42,734	100.00%
Republican hold			
Republican hold			

=== District 28 ===
Primary election results
Party	Candidate	Votes	%
Democratic Party primary results
Democratic	Lillian Field	1,750	28.89%
Democratic	Betty Strauss	1,531	25.28%
Democratic	G. D. (Jerry) Salzman	967	15.96%
Democratic	Charles F. Gannon	909	15.01%
Democratic	Earnest Forrester Romero	900	14.86%
Total votes		6,057	100.00%
Republican Party primary results
Republican	William E. "Bill" Rigel	3,658	29.74%
Republican	Americo "Mac" Carvalho (incumbent)	3,208	26.08%
Republican	Grace M. Jewell	2,631	21.39%
Republican	Otis B. Worley	1,543	12.54%
Republican	Rexbell Young	1,261	10.25%
Total votes		12,301	100.00%

General election results
Party	Candidate	Votes	%
Republican	William E. "Bill" Rigel	11,066	30.42%
Republican	Americo "Mac" Carvalho (incumbent)	10,704	29.42%
Democratic	Betty Strauss	7,474	20.55%
Democratic	Lillian Field	7,134	19.61%
Total votes		36,378	100.00%
Republican hold			
Republican hold			

=== District 29 ===
Primary election results
Party	Candidate	Votes	%
Democratic Party primary results
Democratic	Joseph S. Jarvis	2,698	56.72%
Democratic	Joe Jellicoe	2,059	43.28%
Total votes		4,757	100.00%
Republican Party primary results
Republican	Donna J. Carlson	3,039	25.37%
Republican	Jim Cooper (incumbent)	2,815	23.50%
Republican	R. R. "Bob" Evans	2,767	23.09%
Republican	Dave Hall	2,412	20.13%
Republican	Shane Siren	948	7.91%
Total votes		11,981	100.00%

General election results
Party	Candidate	Votes	%
Republican	Donna J. Carlson	10,267	33.57%
Republican	Jim Cooper (incumbent)	9,928	32.47%
Democratic	Joseph S. Jarvis	6,389	20.89%
Democratic	Joe Jellicoe	3,996	13.07%
Total votes		30,580	100.00%
Republican hold			
Republican hold			

=== District 30 ===
Primary election results
Party	Candidate	Votes	%
Democratic Party primary results
Democratic	Irene A. Leitch	2,954	52.27%
Democratic	Albert L. Vega	2,697	47.73%
Total votes		5,651	100.00%
Republican Party primary results
Republican	James J. Sossaman (incumbent)	4,907	45.05%
Republican	Carl J. Kunasek (incumbent)	4,078	37.44%
Republican	Ross E. Leitch	1,908	17.52%
Total votes		10,893	100.00%

General election results
Party	Candidate	Votes	%
Republican	James J. Sossaman (incumbent)	11,551	32.87%
Republican	Carl J. Kunasek (incumbent)	9,779	27.83%
Democratic	Irene A. Leitch	7,610	21.66%
Democratic	Albert L. Vega	6,200	17.64%
Total votes		35,140	100.00%
Republican hold			
Republican hold			
