= John Gillette =

American politician

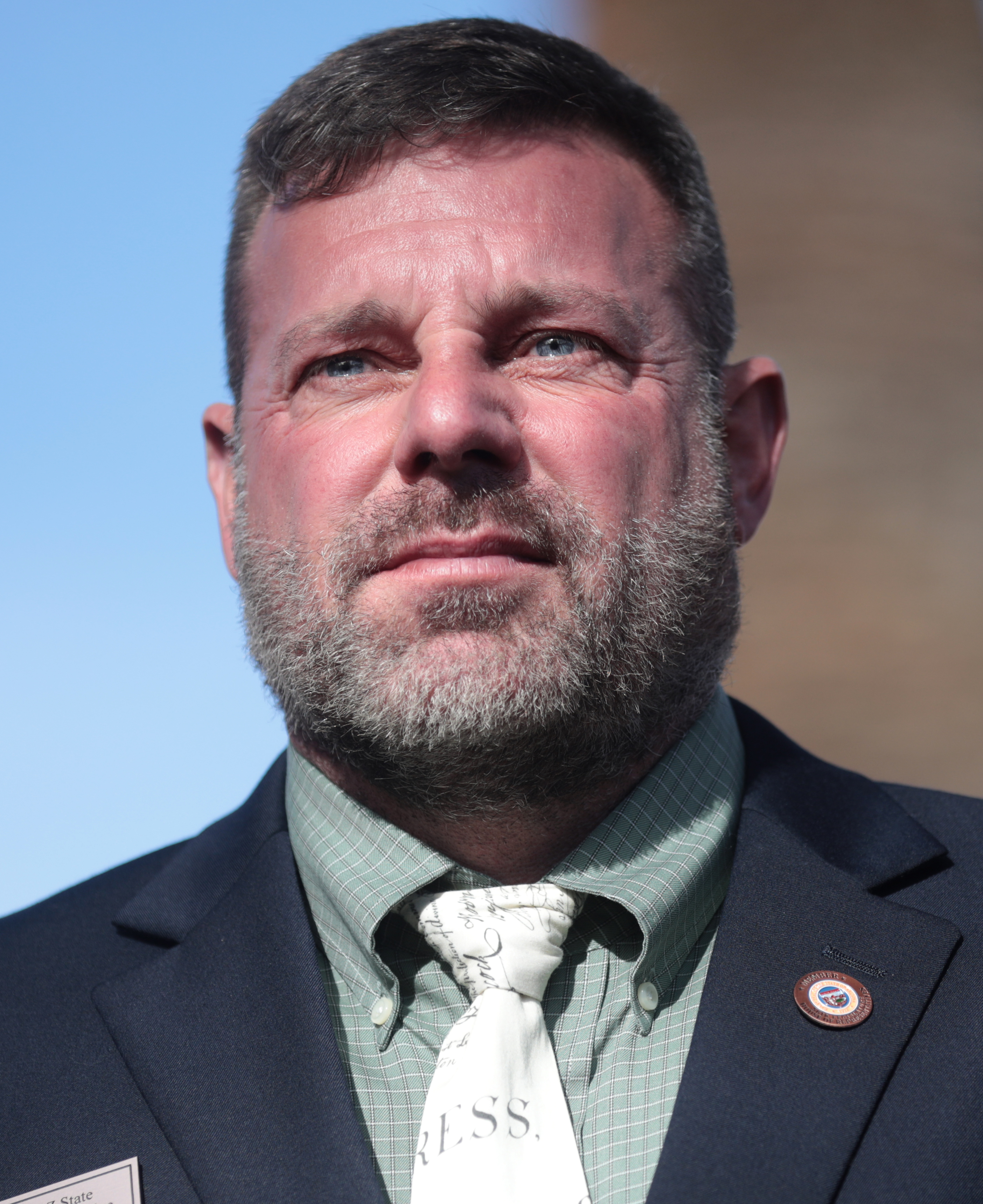
- Gillette in 2023

Member of the Arizona House of Representatives from the 30th district
- Incumbent
- Assumed office January 9, 2023 Serving with Leo Biasiucci
- Preceded by: Christian Solorio
- Succeeded by: Mike Gannuscio (elect)

Personal details
- Party: Republican
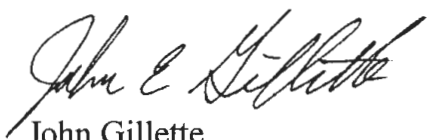
- Signature

John Gillette is an American politician. He represents the 30th district of the Arizona House of Representatives, alongside State Representative Leo Biasiucci.

== Life and career ==
Gilette served as a sheriff's deputy in Sangamon County, Illinois and military police officer in the Illinois National Guard, where he served in the Iraq War and won the Bronze Star Medal. He resigned his deputy post in October 2009 after dozens of internal affairs complaints against his conduct were made public. According to his internal records “Gillette racked up more complaints during his 13 years on patrol than the entire department generated in 2005, 2006 and 2007 combined.” More than 70 deputies worked for the Sangamon County sheriff’s department. Gillette was also a real estate agent.

In August 2022, Gillette defeated Donna McCoy, Marianne Salem, William Hardt and Nohl Rosen in the Republican primary election for the 30th district of the Arizona House of Representatives. In November 2022, he was elected along with Leo Biasiucci in the general election. He assumed office in 2023.

In September 2025, he called for Democratic Representative Pramila Jayapal to be executed for encouraging anti-Trump protests, claiming that she supported the "overthrow of the American government". Gillette had previously expressed support for people arrested as a result of the January 6 United States Capitol attack, calling them "political prisoners". Earlier that month, he had also made social media posts that reject the concept of Islamophobia while calling Muslims "Arizona GOP lawmaker calls Muslims ‘f***ing savages’ and ‘terrorists’ from ‘sh*t hole’ countries".
