= Arizona's 30th legislative district =

American legislative district

- Map of District 30: Approved January 21, 2022
- Senator: Sonny Borrelli (R)
- House members: Leo Biasiucci (R); John Gillette (R)
- Registration: 55.71% Republican; 12.74% Democratic; 30.22% Other
- Demographics: 74% White; 1% Black/African American; 4% Native American; 2% Asian; 17% Hispanic
- Population: 237,999
- Voting-age population: 198,256
- Registered voters: 157,848

Arizona's 30th legislative district is one of 30 in the state, consisting of all of La Paz County and sections of Maricopa County, Mohave County, and Yavapai County. As of 2023, there are 38 precincts in the district, with a total registered voter population of 157,848. The district has an overall population of 237,999.

Following the 2020 United States redistricting cycle, the Arizona Independent Redistricting Commission (AIRC) redrew legislative district boundaries in Arizona. According to the AIRC, the district is outside of competitive range and considered leaning Republican.

== Political representation ==
The district is represented in the 56th Arizona State Legislature, which convenes from January 1, 2023, to December 31, 2024, by Sonny Borrelli (R-Lake Havasu City) in the Arizona Senate and by Leo Biasiucci (R-Lake Havasu City) and John Gillette (R-Kingman) in the Arizona House of Representatives.

| Name | Image | Residence | Office | Party |
|---|---|---|---|---|
| Sonny Borrelli | | Lake Havasu City | State senator | Republican |
| Leo Biasiucci | | Lake Havasu City | State representative | Republican |
| John Gillette | | Kingman | State representative | Republican |

== List of legislators representing the district ==
| Dates | Legislators | | | | | | | | |
| Dates | Senator | Party | Electoral history | Representative | Party | Electoral history | Representative | Party | Electoral history |
|---|---|---|---|---|---|---|---|---|---|
District established January 1, 1971
| January 1, 1971 – December 31, 1972 | D. Delos Ellsworth (Mesa) | Republican | Elected in 1970. Redistricted to the 29th district. | Stan Turley (Mesa) | Republican | Redistricted from the 8th-B district and re-elected in 1970. Retired to run for state senate. | Jim L. Cooper (Mesa) | Republican | Redistricted from the 8th-B district and re-elected in 1970. Redistricted to the 29th district. |
| January 1, 1973 – December 31, 1974 | Stan Turley (Mesa) | Republican | Elected in 1972. Re-elected in 1974. Re-elected in 1976. Re-elected in 1978. Re-elected in 1980. Re-elected in 1982. Re-elected in 1984. Retired. | Carl Kunasek (Mesa) | Republican | Elected in 1972. Re-elected in 1974. Re-elected in 1976. Re-elected in 1978. Re-elected in 1980. Retired. | James J. Sossaman (Mesa) | Republican | Elected in 1972. Re-elected in 1974. Re-elected in 1976. Re-elected in 1978. Re-elected in 1980. Re-elected in 1982. Re-elected in 1984. Retired to run for State Senate. |
| January 1, 1975 – December 31, 1976 | Stan Turley (Mesa) | Republican | Elected in 1972. Re-elected in 1974. Re-elected in 1976. Re-elected in 1978. Re-elected in 1980. Re-elected in 1982. Re-elected in 1984. Retired. | Carl Kunasek (Mesa) | Republican | Elected in 1972. Re-elected in 1974. Re-elected in 1976. Re-elected in 1978. Re-elected in 1980. Retired. | James J. Sossaman (Mesa) | Republican | Elected in 1972. Re-elected in 1974. Re-elected in 1976. Re-elected in 1978. Re-elected in 1980. Re-elected in 1982. Re-elected in 1984. Retired to run for State Senate. |
| January 1, 1977 – December 31, 1978 | Stan Turley (Mesa) | Republican | Elected in 1972. Re-elected in 1974. Re-elected in 1976. Re-elected in 1978. Re-elected in 1980. Re-elected in 1982. Re-elected in 1984. Retired. | Carl Kunasek (Mesa) | Republican | Elected in 1972. Re-elected in 1974. Re-elected in 1976. Re-elected in 1978. Re-elected in 1980. Retired. | James J. Sossaman (Mesa) | Republican | Elected in 1972. Re-elected in 1974. Re-elected in 1976. Re-elected in 1978. Re-elected in 1980. Re-elected in 1982. Re-elected in 1984. Retired to run for State Senate. |
| January 1, 1979 – December 31, 1980 | Stan Turley (Mesa) | Republican | Elected in 1972. Re-elected in 1974. Re-elected in 1976. Re-elected in 1978. Re-elected in 1980. Re-elected in 1982. Re-elected in 1984. Retired. | Carl Kunasek (Mesa) | Republican | Elected in 1972. Re-elected in 1974. Re-elected in 1976. Re-elected in 1978. Re-elected in 1980. Retired. | James J. Sossaman (Mesa) | Republican | Elected in 1972. Re-elected in 1974. Re-elected in 1976. Re-elected in 1978. Re-elected in 1980. Re-elected in 1982. Re-elected in 1984. Retired to run for State Senate. |
| January 1, 1981 – December 31, 1982 | Stan Turley (Mesa) | Republican | Elected in 1972. Re-elected in 1974. Re-elected in 1976. Re-elected in 1978. Re-elected in 1980. Re-elected in 1982. Re-elected in 1984. Retired. | Carl Kunasek (Mesa) | Republican | Elected in 1972. Re-elected in 1974. Re-elected in 1976. Re-elected in 1978. Re-elected in 1980. Retired. | James J. Sossaman (Mesa) | Republican | Elected in 1972. Re-elected in 1974. Re-elected in 1976. Re-elected in 1978. Re-elected in 1980. Re-elected in 1982. Re-elected in 1984. Retired to run for State Senate. |
| January 1, 1983 – December 31, 1984 | Stan Turley (Mesa) | Republican | Elected in 1972. Re-elected in 1974. Re-elected in 1976. Re-elected in 1978. Re-elected in 1980. Re-elected in 1982. Re-elected in 1984. Retired. | Mark Killian (Mesa) | Republican | Elected in 1982. Re-elected in 1984. Re-elected in 1986. Re-elected in 1988. Re-elected in 1990. Re-elected in 1992. Re-elected in 1994. Retired. | James J. Sossaman (Mesa) | Republican | Elected in 1972. Re-elected in 1974. Re-elected in 1976. Re-elected in 1978. Re-elected in 1980. Re-elected in 1982. Re-elected in 1984. Retired to run for State Senate. |
| January 1, 1985 – December 31, 1986 | Stan Turley (Mesa) | Republican | Elected in 1972. Re-elected in 1974. Re-elected in 1976. Re-elected in 1978. Re-elected in 1980. Re-elected in 1982. Re-elected in 1984. Retired. | Mark Killian (Mesa) | Republican | Elected in 1982. Re-elected in 1984. Re-elected in 1986. Re-elected in 1988. Re-elected in 1990. Re-elected in 1992. Re-elected in 1994. Retired. | James J. Sossaman (Mesa) | Republican | Elected in 1972. Re-elected in 1974. Re-elected in 1976. Re-elected in 1978. Re-elected in 1980. Re-elected in 1982. Re-elected in 1984. Retired to run for State Senate. |
| January 1, 1987 – December 31, 1988 | James J. Sossaman (Mesa) | Republican | Elected in 1986. Re-elected in 1988. Re-elected in 1990. Retired. | Mark Killian (Mesa) | Republican | Elected in 1982. Re-elected in 1984. Re-elected in 1986. Re-elected in 1988. Re-elected in 1990. Re-elected in 1992. Re-elected in 1994. Retired. | Bill Mundell (Chandler) | Republican | Elected in 1986. Re-elected in 1988. Re-elected in 1990. Retired. |
| January 1, 1989 – December 31, 1990 | James J. Sossaman (Mesa) | Republican | Elected in 1986. Re-elected in 1988. Re-elected in 1990. Retired. | Mark Killian (Mesa) | Republican | Elected in 1982. Re-elected in 1984. Re-elected in 1986. Re-elected in 1988. Re-elected in 1990. Re-elected in 1992. Re-elected in 1994. Retired. | Bill Mundell (Chandler) | Republican | Elected in 1986. Re-elected in 1988. Re-elected in 1990. Retired. |
| January 1, 1991 – December 31, 1992 | James J. Sossaman (Mesa) | Republican | Elected in 1986. Re-elected in 1988. Re-elected in 1990. Retired. | Mark Killian (Mesa) | Republican | Elected in 1982. Re-elected in 1984. Re-elected in 1986. Re-elected in 1988. Re-elected in 1990. Re-elected in 1992. Re-elected in 1994. Retired. | Bill Mundell (Chandler) | Republican | Elected in 1986. Re-elected in 1988. Re-elected in 1990. Retired. |
| January 1, 1993 – December 31, 1994 | Larry Chesley (Mesa) | Republican | Elected in 1992. Re-elected in 1994. Retired. | Mark Killian (Mesa) | Republican | Elected in 1982. Re-elected in 1984. Re-elected in 1986. Re-elected in 1988. Re-elected in 1990. Re-elected in 1992. Re-elected in 1994. Retired. | Jeff Groscost (Mesa) | Republican | Elected in 1992. Re-elected in 1994. Re-elected in 1996. Re-elected in 1998. Retired. |
| January 1, 1995 – December 31, 1996 | Larry Chesley (Mesa) | Republican | Elected in 1992. Re-elected in 1994. Retired. | Mark Killian (Mesa) | Republican | Elected in 1982. Re-elected in 1984. Re-elected in 1986. Re-elected in 1988. Re-elected in 1990. Re-elected in 1992. Re-elected in 1994. Retired. | Jeff Groscost (Mesa) | Republican | Elected in 1992. Re-elected in 1994. Re-elected in 1996. Re-elected in 1998. Retired. |
| January 1, 1997 – December 31, 1998 | Tom Freestone (Mesa) | Republican | Elected in 1996. Re-elected in 1998. Retired. | Karen Johnson (Mesa) | Republican | Elected in 1998. Re-elected in 2000. Redistricted to the 18th district. | Jeff Groscost (Mesa) | Republican | Elected in 1992. Re-elected in 1994. Re-elected in 1996. Re-elected in 1998. Retired. |
| January 1, 1999 – December 31, 2000 | Tom Freestone (Mesa) | Republican | Elected in 1996. Re-elected in 1998. Retired. | Karen Johnson (Mesa) | Republican | Elected in 1998. Re-elected in 2000. Redistricted to the 18th district. | Jeff Groscost (Mesa) | Republican | Elected in 1992. Re-elected in 1994. Re-elected in 1996. Re-elected in 1998. Retired. |
| January 1, 2001 – December 31, 2002 | Jay Blanchard (Mesa) | Democratic | Elected in 2000. Retired. | Karen Johnson (Mesa) | Republican | Elected in 1998. Re-elected in 2000. Redistricted to the 18th district. | Eddie Farnsworth (Chandler) | Republican | Elected in 2000. Redistricted to the 22nd district. |
| January 1, 2003 – December 31, 2004 | Tim Bee (Tucson) | Republican | Elected in 2002. Re-elected in 2004. Re-elected in 2006. Termed out and ran for U.S. House. | Randy Graf (Mesa) | Republican | Redistricted from the 9th district and re-elected in 2002. Retired to run for U.S. House. | Marian McClure (Mesa) | Republican | Redistricted from the 9th district and re-elected in 2002. Re-elected in 2004. Re-elected in 2006. Termed out. |
| January 1, 2005 – December 31, 2006 | Tim Bee (Tucson) | Republican | Elected in 2002. Re-elected in 2004. Re-elected in 2006. Termed out and ran for U.S. House. | Jonathan Paton (Tucson) | Republican | Elected in 2004. Re-elected in 2006. Retired to run for State Senate. | Marian McClure (Mesa) | Republican | Redistricted from the 9th district and re-elected in 2002. Re-elected in 2004. Re-elected in 2006. Termed out. |
| January 1, 2007 – December 31, 2008 | Tim Bee (Tucson) | Republican | Elected in 2002. Re-elected in 2004. Re-elected in 2006. Termed out and ran for U.S. House. | Jonathan Paton (Tucson) | Republican | Elected in 2004. Re-elected in 2006. Retired to run for State Senate. | Marian McClure (Mesa) | Republican | Redistricted from the 9th district and re-elected in 2002. Re-elected in 2004. Re-elected in 2006. Termed out. |
| January 1, 2009 – December 31, 2010 | Jonathan Paton (Tucson) | Republican | Elected in 2008. Resigned to run for U.S. House. | Frank Antenori (Tucson) | Republican | Elected in 2008. Resigned to become State Senator. | David Gowan (Sierra Vista) | Republican | Elected in 2008. Re-elected in 2010. Redistricted to the 14th district. |
| January 1, 2009 – December 31, 2010 | Vacant February 22, 2010 – March 3, 2010 | | | Vacant February 22, 2010 – March 16, 2010 | | | David Gowan (Sierra Vista) | Republican | Elected in 2008. Re-elected in 2010. Redistricted to the 14th district. |
| January 1, 2009 – December 31, 2010 | Frank Antenori (Tucson) | Republican | Appointed to finish Paton's term. Elected in 2010. Redistricted to the 10th district and lost re-election. | Ted Vogt (Tucson) | Republican | Appointed to finish Antenori's term. Elected in 2010. Redistricted to the 10th district and lost re-election. | David Gowan (Sierra Vista) | Republican | Elected in 2008. Re-elected in 2010. Redistricted to the 14th district. |
| January 1, 2011 – December 31, 2012 | Frank Antenori (Tucson) | Republican | Appointed to finish Paton's term. Elected in 2010. Redistricted to the 10th district and lost re-election. | Ted Vogt (Tucson) | Republican | Appointed to finish Antenori's term. Elected in 2010. Redistricted to the 10th district and lost re-election. | David Gowan (Sierra Vista) | Republican | Elected in 2008. Re-elected in 2010. Redistricted to the 14th district. |
| January 1, 2013 – December 31, 2014 | Robert Meza (Phoenix) | Democratic | Redistricted from the 14th district and re-elected in 2012. Re-elected in 2014. Re-elected in 2016. Retired. | Jonathan Larkin (Phoenix) | Democratic | Elected in 2012. Re-elected in 2014. Lost re-election. | Debbie M. Davis (Phoenix) | Democratic | Redistricted from the 14th district and re-elected in 2012. Re-elected in 2014. Retired. |
| January 1, 2015 – December 31, 2016 | Robert Meza (Phoenix) | Democratic | Redistricted from the 14th district and re-elected in 2012. Re-elected in 2014. Re-elected in 2016. Retired. | Jonathan Larkin (Phoenix) | Democratic | Elected in 2012. Re-elected in 2014. Lost re-election. | Debbie M. Davis (Phoenix) | Democratic | Redistricted from the 14th district and re-elected in 2012. Re-elected in 2014. Retired. |
| January 1, 2017 – December 31, 2018 | Robert Meza (Phoenix) | Democratic | Redistricted from the 14th district and re-elected in 2012. Re-elected in 2014. Re-elected in 2016. Retired. | Ray Martinez (Phoenix) | Democratic | Elected in 2016. Retired. | Tony Navarrete (Phoenix) | Democratic | Elected in 2016. Retired to run for State Senate. |
| January 1, 2019 – December 31, 2020 | Tony Navarrete (Phoenix) | Democratic | Elected in 2018. Elected in 2020. Resigned. | Robert Meza (Phoenix) | Democratic | Elected in 2018. Re-elected in 2020. Redistricted to the 26th district and retired. | Raquel Terán (Phoenix) | Democratic | Elected in 2018. Resigned to become State Senator. |
| January 1, 2021 – December 31, 2022 | Tony Navarrete (Phoenix) | Democratic | Elected in 2018. Elected in 2020. Resigned. | Robert Meza (Phoenix) | Democratic | Elected in 2018. Re-elected in 2020. Redistricted to the 26th district and retired. | Raquel Terán (Phoenix) | Democratic | Elected in 2018. Resigned to become State Senator. |
| January 1, 2021 – December 31, 2022 | Vacant August 10, 2021 – September 28, 2021 | | | Robert Meza (Phoenix) | Democratic | Elected in 2018. Re-elected in 2020. Redistricted to the 26th district and retired. | Vacant September 28, 2021 – November 4, 2021 | | |
| January 1, 2021 – December 31, 2022 | Raquel Terán (Phoenix) | Democratic | Appointed to finish Navarrete's term. Redistricted to the 26th district. | Robert Meza (Phoenix) | Democratic | Elected in 2018. Re-elected in 2020. Redistricted to the 26th district and retired. | Christian Solorio (Phoenix) | Democratic | Appointed to finish Terán's term. Redistricted to the 27th district and lost re-election. |
| January 1, 2023 – December 31, 2024 | Sonny Borrelli (Lake Havasu City) | Republican | Redistricted from the 5th district and re-elected in 2022. Term-limited and retired. | Leo Biasiucci (Lake Havasu City) | Republican | Redistricted from the 5th district and re-elected in 2022. Re-elected in 2024. | John Gillette (Kingman) | Republican | Elected in 2022. Re-elected in 2024. |
| January 15, 2025 | Hildy Angius (Bullhead City) | Republican | Elected in 2024. | Leo Biasiucci (Lake Havasu City) | Republican | Redistricted from the 5th district and re-elected in 2022. Re-elected in 2024. | John Gillette (Kingman) | Republican | Elected in 2022. Re-elected in 2024. |

== Election results ==
The 2022 elections were the first in the newly drawn district.

=== Arizona Senate ===
2022 Arizona's 30th Senate district election
| Party | Candidate | Votes | % |
|---|---|---|---|
| Republican | Sonny Borrelli (incumbent) | 73,780 | 100 |
| Total votes | | 73,780 | 100 |
| Republican hold | | | |

=== Arizona House of Representatives ===
2022 Arizona House of Representatives election, 30th district
| Party | Candidate | Votes | % |
|---|---|---|---|
| Republican | Leo Biasiucci (incumbent) | 62,416 | 56.28 |
| Republican | John Gillette | 48,489 | 43.72 |
| Total votes | | 110,905 | 100.00 |
| Republican hold | | | |
| Republican hold | | | |

== See also ==
- List of Arizona legislative districts
- Arizona State Legislature
