= 1972 Arizona House of Representatives election =

1972 Arizona House of Representatives elections
- November 7, 1972

All 60 seats in the Arizona House 31 seats needed for a majority
	Majority party	Minority party
Party	Republican	Democratic
Last election	34	26
Seats after	38	22
Seat change	▲4	▼4
Speaker before election
Timothy A. Barrow
Republican
Elected Speaker
Stanley W. Akers
Republican

The 1972 Arizona House of Representatives elections were held on November 7, 1972. Voters elected all 60 members of the Arizona House of Representatives in multi-member districts to serve a two-year term. The elections coincided with the elections for other offices, including U.S. House and State Senate. Primary elections were held on September 12, 1972.

Prior to the elections, the Republicans held a majority of 34 seats over the Democrats' 26 seats.

Following the elections, Republicans maintained control of the chamber and expanded their majority to 38 Republicans to 22 Democrats, a net gain of four seats for Republicans.

The newly elected members served in the 31st Arizona State Legislature, during which Republican Stanley W. Akers was chosen as speaker of the Arizona House. (Note: Akers was elected as speaker for the 31st legislature, defeating Representative Davids, who was also nominated for speaker. The vote tally for Speaker was: Akers-38 votes to Davids-20 votes. Representative Fenn did not cast a vote. Representative Hamilton was unable to vote for speaker because he was not sworn into office until January 19, 1973 when he attained 25 years of age.)

== Summary of results by Arizona State Legislative district ==
District	Incumbent	Party	Elected representative	Outcome
1st	Gladys Gardner	Rep	Gladys Gardner	Rep hold
1st	Ray Everett	Rep	Ray Everett	Rep hold
2nd	Sam A. McConnell Jr.	Rep	Sam A. McConnell Jr.	Rep hold
2nd	Harold L. Huffer	Dem	John Wettaw	Rep gain
3rd	Boyd A. Shumway (Note: Redistricted from district 3 to 2.)	Dem	Jack A. Brown (Note: Redistricted from district 4 to 3.)	Dem hold
3rd	Glen L. Flake	Dem	Benjamin Hanley	Dem hold
4th	Jack A. Brown	Dem	E. C. "Polly" Rosenbaum (Note: Redistricted from district 7 to 4.)	Dem hold
4th	G. O. "Sonny" Biles	Dem	Edward G. (Bunch) Guerrero (Note: Redistricted from district 7 to 4.)	Dem hold
5th	Elwood W. "Brad" Bradford	Dem	Elwood W. "Brad" Bradford	Dem hold
5th	Jones Osborn	Dem	Jones Osborn (Note: Upon the resignation of Jones Osborn, April 27, 1973, Frank C. McElhaney was appointed as his replacement May 4, 1973.)	Dem hold
6th	Polly Getzwiller	Dem	Polly Getzwiller	Dem hold
6th	Craig E. Davids (Note: Redistricted from district 6 to 7.)	Dem	G. T. (Tom) Alley	Dem hold
7th	E. C. "Polly" Rosenbaum	Dem	Craig E. Davids	Dem hold
7th	Edward G. (Bunch) Guerrero	Dem	Richard "Dick" Pacheco (Note: Redistricted from district 9 to 7.)	Dem hold
8th	H. F. "Hank" Fenn	Dem	H. F. "Hank" Fenn	Dem hold
8th	Ed C. Sawyer	Dem	Ed C. Sawyer	Dem hold
9th	William R. (Bill) Ryan	Dem	Thomas B. Richey	Rep gain
9th	Richard "Dick" Pacheco	Dem	Jim Dewberry (Note: Redistricted from district 12 to 9.)	Dem hold
10th	E. S. "Bud" Walker	Dem	Larry Bahill	Dem hold
10th	Bernardo M. "Nayo" Cajero	Dem	Bernardo M. "Nayo" Cajero (Note: Upon the death of Bernardo M. "Nayo" Cajero, January 14, 1973, Carmen F. Cajero was appointed as his replacement January 29, 1973.)	Dem hold
11th	Etta Mae Hutcheson	Dem	R. P. "Bob" Fricks (Note: Redistricted from district 12 to 11.)	Dem hold
11th	Ethel Maynard	Dem	Emilio Carrillo	Dem hold
12th	R. P. "Bob" Fricks	Dem	Thomas N. "Tom" Goodwin (Note: Redistricted from district 13 to 12.)	Rep gain
12th	Jim Dewberry	Dem	Pete Hershberger	Rep gain
13th	Thomas N. "Tom" Goodwin	Rep	Helen Grace Carlson (Note: Redistricted from district 14 to 13.)	Dem gain
13th	H. Thomas (Tam) Kincaid	Rep	H. Thomas (Tam) Kincaid	Rep hold
14th	David B. Stone (Note: Redistricted from district 14 to 13.)	Rep	W. A. (Tony) Buehl (Note: Redistricted from district 15 to 14.)	Rep hold
14th	Helen Grace Carlson	Dem	Charles W. King (Note: Redistricted from district 15 to 14.)	Rep gain
15th	W. A. (Tony) Buehl	Rep	James B. Ratliff (Note: Redistricted from district 17 to 15.)	Rep hold
15th	Charles W. King	Rep	J. Herbert Everett	Rep hold
16th	C. W. "Bill" Lewis (Note: Redistricted from district 16 to 17.)	Rep	Don Stewart (Note: Redistricted from district 18 to 16.)	Rep hold
16th	Hal Runyan	Rep	Diane B. McCarthy	Rep hold
17th	W. Vincent Thelander, Sr. (Note: Republican W. Vincent Thelander, Sr. was appointed on January 18, 1971 to fill the vacancy created by the resignation of Republican Representative Stuart Schoenburg, District 17, Maricopa County, Arizona.)	Rep	C. W. "Bill" Lewis	Rep hold
17th	James B. Ratliff	Rep	Anne Lindeman	Rep hold
18th	Don Stewart	Rep	Burton S. Barr (Note: Redistricted from district 23 to 18.)	Rep hold
18th	Bob Strother	Rep	Ruth Peck (Note: Redistricted from district 23 to 18.)	Rep hold
19th	Timothy A. Barrow	Rep	W. A. "Tony" West Jr.	Rep hold
19th	Stan Akers	Rep	Stan Akers	Rep hold
20th	Ruth Adams	Rep	Bill McCune (Note: Redistricted from district 22 to 20.)	Rep hold
20th	Richard Burgess (Note: Redistricted from district 20 to 24.)	Rep	Howard Adams (Note: Redistricted from district 22 to 20.)	Rep hold
21st	Peter Kay (Note: Redistricted from district 21 to 26.)	Rep	Jay C. Stuckey (Note: Redistricted from district 24 to 21.)	Rep hold
21st	Sam Flake	Rep	Elizabeth Adams Rockwell (Note: Redistricted from district 24 to 21.)	Rep hold
22nd	Bill McCune	Rep	R. G. "Danny" Peña	Dem gain
22nd	Howard Adams	Rep	Art Hamilton (Note: Representative Hamilton was unable to take the oath of office until his 25th birthday, January 19, 1973, which is the minimum age required by law to be a member of the Arizona House of Representatives.)	Dem gain
23rd	Burton S. Barr	Rep	Leon Thompson (Note: Redistricted from district 28 to 23.)	Dem gain
23rd	Ruth Peck	Rep	Tony R. Abril	Dem gain
24th	Elizabeth Adams Rockwell	Rep	Richard Burgess	Rep hold
24th	Jay C. Stuckey, Sr.	Rep	Pete Corpstein	Rep hold
25th	D. Lee Jones	Rep	D. Lee Jones	Rep hold
25th	Jim Skelly	Rep	Jim Skelly	Rep hold
26th	Frank Kelley	Rep	Frank Kelley	Rep hold
26th	Bob Hungerford (Note: Redistricted from district 26 to 28.)	Rep	Peter Kay	Rep hold
27th	Manuel "Lito" Peña	Dem	Michael Goodwin (Note: Redistricted from district 29 to 27.)	Rep gain
27th	Art Coppinger	Dem	Juanita Harelson	Rep gain
28th	Horace E. Owens (Note: Redistricted from district 28 to 23.)	Dem	Bob Hungerford	Rep gain
28th	Leon Thompson	Dem	Americo "Mac" Carvalho	Rep gain
29th	Michael Goodwin	Rep	Jack J. Taylor	Rep hold
29th	James J. Sossaman (Note: Redistricted from district 29 to 30.)	Rep	Jim Cooper (Note: Redistricted from district 30 to 29.)	Rep hold
30th	Jim Cooper	Rep	James J. Sossaman	Rep hold
30th	Stan Turley	Rep	Carl J. Kunasek	Rep hold

== Detailed Results ==
=== District 1 ===
Primary election results
Party	Candidate	Votes	%
Republican Party primary results
Republican	Ray Everett (incumbent)	5,059	38.95%
Republican	Gladys Gardner (incumbent)	4,871	37.50%
Republican	Duane Kirby	3,059	23.55%
Total votes		12,989	100.00%

General election results
Party	Candidate	Votes	%
Republican	Gladys Gardner (incumbent)	18,440	50.09%
Republican	Ray Everett (incumbent)	18,375	49.91%
Total votes		36,815	100.00%
Republican hold			
Republican hold			

=== District 2 ===
Primary election results
Party	Candidate	Votes	%
Democratic Party primary results
Democratic	Boyd A. Shumway (incumbent)	5,655	54.51%
Democratic	Mike Clifton	4,719	45.49%
Total votes		10,374	100.00%
Republican Party primary results
Republican	Sam A. McConnell Jr. (incumbent)	4,038	53.12%
Republican	John Wettaw	3,563	46.88%
Total votes		7,601	100.00%

General election results
Party	Candidate	Votes	%
Republican	Sam A. McConnell (incumbent)	11,291	29.15%
Republican	John Wettaw	9,527	24.60%
Democratic	Boyd A. Shumway (incumbent)	9,346	24.13%
Democratic	Mike Clifton	8,564	22.11%
Total votes		38,728	100.00%
Republican hold			
Republican gain from Democratic			

=== District 3 ===
Primary election results
Party	Candidate	Votes	%
Democratic Party primary results
Democratic	Jack A. Brown (incumbent)	2,470	34.11%
Democratic	Benjamin Hanley	2,110	29.14%
Democratic	Adolph June Jr.	1,479	20.42%
Democratic	Cordell Hull McKinley	1,183	16.34%
Total votes		7,242	100.00%
Republican Party primary results
Republican	Winifred Becenti Hall Sims	1,917	100.00%
Total votes		1,917	100.00%

General election results
Party	Candidate	Votes	%
Democratic	Benjamin Hanley	8,406	38.95%
Democratic	Jack A. Brown (incumbent)	8,146	37.75%
Republican	Winifred Becenti Hall Sims	5,029	23.30%
Total votes		21,581	100.00%
Democratic hold			
Democratic hold			

=== District 4 ===
Primary election results
Party	Candidate	Votes	%
Democratic Party primary results
Democratic	Edward G. (Bunch) Guerrero (incumbent)	6,801	29.17%
Democratic	E. C. "Polly" Rosenbaum (incumbent)	6,028	25.86%
Democratic	John W. "Mac" McLaughlin	5,524	23.69%
Democratic	Louis B. Ellsworth	4,960	21.28%
Total votes		23,313	100.00%

General election results
Party	Candidate	Votes	%
Democratic	E. C. "Polly" Rosenbaum (incumbent)	15,278	51.19%
Democratic	Edward G. (Bunch) Guerrero (incumbent)	14,565	48.81%
Total votes		29,843	100.00%
Democratic hold			
Democratic hold			

=== District 5 ===
Primary election results
Party	Candidate	Votes	%
Democratic Party primary results
Democratic	Jones Osborn (incumbent)	5,377	52.08%
Democratic	Elwood W. "Brad" Bradford (incumbent)	4,947	47.92%
Total votes		10,324	100.00%

General election results
Party	Candidate	Votes	%
Democratic	Jones Osborn (incumbent)	10,824	50.91%
Democratic	Elwood W. "Brad" Bradford (incumbent)	10,439	49.09%
Total votes		21,263	100.00%
Democratic hold			
Democratic hold			

=== District 6 ===
Primary election results
Party	Candidate	Votes	%
Democratic Party primary results
Democratic	Polly Getzwiller (incumbent)	2,844	29.01%
Democratic	G. T. (Tom) Alley	2,103	21.45%
Democratic	Alma J. Hunter	2,050	20.91%
Democratic	Douglas E. Ballard	1,454	14.83%
Democratic	Nancy McClary	1,353	13.80%
Total votes		9,804	100.00%

General election results
Party	Candidate	Votes	%
Democratic	Polly Getzwiller (incumbent)	9,006	52.62%
Democratic	G. T. (Tom) Alley	8,110	47.38%
Total votes		17,116	100.00%
Democratic hold			
Democratic hold			

=== District 7 ===
Primary election results
Party	Candidate	Votes	%
Democratic Party primary results
Democratic	Richard "Dick" Pacheco (incumbent)	6,374	52.22%
Democratic	Craig E. Davids (incumbent)	5,832	47.78%
Total votes		12,206	100.00%
American Independent Party primary results
American Independent	George Edward Butler (Note: Was a write-in candidate in the primary election.)	4	100.00%
Total votes		4	100.00%

General election results
Party	Candidate	Votes	%
Democratic	Richard "Dick" Pacheco (incumbent)	11,820	53.82%
Democratic	Craig E. Davids (incumbent)	10,144	46.18%
Total votes		21,964	100.00%
Democratic hold			
Democratic hold			

=== District 8 ===
Primary election results
Party	Candidate	Votes	%
Democratic Party primary results
Democratic	Ed C. Sawyer (incumbent)	9,374	50.11%
Democratic	H. F. "Hank" Fenn (incumbent)	9,331	49.89%
Total votes		18,705	100.00%
Republican Party primary results
Republican	Walter L. (Walt) Foster	2,472	100.00%
Total votes		2,472	100.00%

General election results
Party	Candidate	Votes	%
Democratic	H. F. "Hank" Fenn (incumbent)	13,300	39.38%
Democratic	Ed C. Sawyer (incumbent)	13,189	39.05%
Republican	Walter L. (Walt) Foster	7,282	21.56%
Total votes		33,771	100.00%
Democratic hold			
Democratic hold			

=== District 9 ===
Primary election results
Party	Candidate	Votes	%
Democratic Party primary results
Democratic	Jim Dewberry (incumbent)	3,393	41.67%
Democratic	David F. "Lucky" Lindsay	2,449	30.08%
Democratic	E. H. "Gene" Mondeau	2,300	28.25%
Total votes		8,142	100.00%
Republican Party primary results
Republican	Thomas B. Richey	3,008	50.57%
Republican	Charles F. Bonnet	2,940	49.43%
Total votes		5,948	100.00%

General election results
Party	Candidate	Votes	%
Republican	Thomas B. Richey	8,712	27.20%
Democratic	Jim Dewberry (incumbent)	8,320	25.98%
Republican	Charles F. Bonnet	7,789	24.32%
Democratic	David F. "Lucky" Lindsay	7,208	22.50%
Total votes		32,029	100.00%
Republican gain from Democratic			
Democratic hold			

=== District 10 ===
Primary election results
Party	Candidate	Votes	%
Democratic Party primary results
Democratic	Bernardo M. "Nayo" Cajero (incumbent)	3,808	39.70%
Democratic	Larry Bahill	3,108	32.40%
Democratic	Hubert Davis	2,676	27.90%
Total votes		9,592	100.00%
Republican Party primary results
Republican	Dan Eckstrom	1,097	100.00%
Total votes		1,097	100.00%

General election results
Party	Candidate	Votes	%
Democratic	Bernardo M. "Nayo" Cajero (incumbent)	9,592	40.02%
Democratic	Larry Bahill	9,588	40.00%
Republican	Dan Eckstrom	4,791	19.99%
Total votes		23,971	100.00%
Democratic hold			
Democratic hold			

=== District 11 ===
Primary election results
Party	Candidate	Votes	%
Democratic Party primary results
Democratic	Emilio Carrillo	3,605	29.63%
Democratic	R. P. "Bob" Fricks (incumbent)	2,451	20.14%
Democratic	Ethel R. Maynard	2,283	18.76%
Democratic	Ernie Soto Navarro	2,228	18.31%
Democratic	Nathaniel S. (Nat) Russell	1,600	13.15%
Total votes		12,167	100.00%
Republican Party primary results
Republican	James (Jim) R. Madson	2,066	50.74%
Republican	Alfred (Skip) S. Donau III	2,006	49.26%
Total votes		4,072	100.00%

General election results
Party	Candidate	Votes	%
Democratic	Emilio Carrillo	10,448	32.06%
Democratic	R. P. "Bob" Fricks (incumbent)	9,145	28.06%
Republican	Alfred (Skip) S. Donau III	6,099	18.71%
Republican	James (Jim) R. Madson	5,408	16.59%
Good Neighbors Union (GNU)	Johnny W. Bowens	1,491	4.57%
Total votes		32,591	100.00%
Democratic hold			
Democratic hold			

=== District 12 ===
Primary election results
Party	Candidate	Votes	%
Democratic Party primary results
Democratic	Jim Magner	5,011	50.29%
Democratic	Martin Bedford	4,954	49.71%
Total votes		9,965	100.00%
Republican Party primary results
Republican	Thomas N. "Tom" Goodwin (incumbent)	3,785	39.99%
Republican	Pete Hershberger	3,352	35.41%
Republican	Marvin L. Burton	2,329	24.60%
Total votes		9,466	100.00%
American Independent Party primary results
American Independent	Lawrence F. Oliver	11	100.00%
Total votes		11	100.00%

General election results
Party	Candidate	Votes	%
Republican	Thomas N. "Tom" Goodwin (incumbent)	12,018	26.25%
Republican	Pete Hershberger	11,750	25.67%
Democratic	Jim Magner	10,308	22.52%
Democratic	Martin Bedford	8,717	19.04%
Good Neighbors Union (GNU)	Mary Janet "Jinx" Damon	2,414	5.27%
American Independent	Lawrence Oliver	574	1.25%
Total votes		45,781	100.00%
Republican gain from Democratic			
Republican gain from Democratic			

=== District 13 ===
Primary election results
Party	Candidate	Votes	%
Democratic Party primary results
Democratic	Helen Carlson (incumbent)	5,547	50.57%
Democratic	Robert F. Walmer	5,423	49.43%
Total votes		10,970	100.00%
Republican Party primary results
Republican	H. Thomas (Tam) Kincaid (incumbent)	4,365	41.51%
Republican	Albert C. Williams	3,145	29.91%
Republican	David B. Stone (incumbent)	3,006	28.59%
Total votes		10,516	100.00%

General election results
Party	Candidate	Votes	%
Republican	H. Thomas (Tam) Kincaid (incumbent)	13,958	30.03%
Democratic	Helen Grace Carlson (incumbent)	11,587	24.93%
Republican	Albert C. Williams	11,074	23.83%
Democratic	(Bob) Robert F. Walmer	9,861	21.22%
Total votes		46,480	100.00%
Republican hold			
Democratic gain from Republican			

=== District 14 ===
Primary election results
Party	Candidate	Votes	%
Democratic Party primary results
Democratic	Anna J. Cullinan	5,136	50.05%
Democratic	Robert Proctor	5,125	49.95%
Total votes		10,261	100.00%
Republican Party primary results
Republican	W. A. (Tony) Buehl (incumbent)	6,284	50.45%
Republican	Charles W. King (incumbent)	6,173	49.55%
Total votes		12,457	100.00%

General election results
Party	Candidate	Votes	%
Republican	W. A. (Tony) Buehl (incumbent)	15,266	31.90%
Republican	Charles W. King (incumbent)	12,696	26.53%
Democratic	Anna J. Cullinan	10,440	21.81%
Democratic	Robert Proctor	9,460	19.77%
Total votes		47,862	100.00%
Republican hold			
Republican gain from Democratic			

=== District 15 ===
Primary election results
Party	Candidate	Votes	%
Democratic Party primary results
Democratic	Cornelio "Corne" Arvizu	3,084	51.41%
Democratic	Marabell L. Krauth	2,915	48.59%
Total votes		5,999	100.00%
Republican Party primary results
Republican	James B. Ratliff (incumbent)	4,905	39.99%
Republican	J. Herbert Everett	4,502	36.71%
Republican	Edward Dwight Lewis	2,858	23.30%
Total votes		12,265	100.00%

General election results
Party	Candidate	Votes	%
Republican	James B. Ratliff (incumbent)	13,212	35.50%
Republican	J. Herbert Everett	12,950	34.80%
Democratic	Marabell L. Krauth	5,619	15.10%
Democratic	Cornelio "Corne" Arvizu	5,431	14.59%
Total votes		37,212	100.00%
Republican hold			
Republican hold			

=== District 16 ===
Primary election results
Party	Candidate	Votes	%
Democratic Party primary results
Democratic	Donna Willey	2,775	36.77%
Democratic	Nancy Lowe	2,611	34.60%
Democratic	Isabel P. Keating	2,160	28.62%
Total votes		7,546	100.00%
Republican Party primary results
Republican	Don Stewart (incumbent)	3,778	32.50%
Republican	Diane B. McCarthy	3,334	28.68%
Republican	M. C. "Mac" Plummer	2,409	20.72%
Republican	Dave Andrews	2,103	18.09%
Total votes		11,624	100.00%

General election results
Party	Candidate	Votes	%
Republican	Don Stewart (incumbent)	14,832	32.35%
Republican	Diane B. McCarthy	14,459	31.54%
Democratic	Donna Willey	8,839	19.28%
Democratic	Nancy Lowe	7,720	16.84%
Total votes		45,850	100.00%
Republican hold			
Republican hold			

=== District 17 ===
Primary election results
Party	Candidate	Votes	%
Democratic Party primary results
Democratic	Chris Lawlor	2,937	50.54%
Democratic	John B. Lytle	2,874	49.46%
Total votes		5,811	100.00%
Republican Party primary results
Republican	C. W. "Bill" Lewis (incumbent)	5,645	51.14%
Republican	Anne Lindeman	5,394	48.86%
Total votes		11,039	100.00%

General election results
Party	Candidate	Votes	%
Republican	Anne Lindeman	13,751	33.03%
Republican	C. W. "Bill" Lewis (incumbent)	13,281	31.90%
Democratic	John B. Lytle	7,508	18.04%
Democratic	Chris Lawlor	7,088	17.03%
Total votes		41,628	100.00%
Republican hold			
Republican hold			

=== District 18 ===
Primary election results
Party	Candidate	Votes	%
Democratic Party primary tesults
Democratic	Elaine Warner	3,758	100.00%
Total votes		3,758	100.00%
Republican Party primary results
Republican	Burton S. Barr (incumbent)	6,788	50.94%
Republican	Ruth Peck (incumbent)	6,537	49.06%
Total votes		13,325	100.00%

General election results
Party	Candidate	Votes	%
Republican	Burton S. Barr (incumbent)	15,330	38.71%
Republican	Ruth Peck (incumbent)	14,919	37.68%
Democratic	Elaine Warner	9,350	23.61%
Total votes		39,599	100.00%
Republican hold			
Republican hold			

=== District 19 ===
Primary election results
Party	Candidate	Votes	%
Democratic Party primary results
Democratic	Ron G. Sartor	3,584	100.00%
Total votes		3,584	100.00%
Republican Party primary results
Republican	W. A. "Tony" West Jr.	3,287	23.11%
Republican	Stan Akers (incumbent)	3,197	22.48%
Republican	Harold M. Musgrave	2,867	20.16%
Republican	Mary Jane Shoun	2,562	18.01%
Republican	Jon M. Nelson	2,310	16.24%
Total votes		14,223	100.00%

General election results
Party	Candidate	Votes	%
Republican	Stan Akers (incumbent)	14,535	38.92%
Republican	W. A. "Tony" West Jr.	14,179	37.97%
Democratic	Ron G. Sartor	8,633	23.12%
Total votes		37,347	100.00%
Republican hold			
Republican hold			

=== District 20 ===
Primary election results
Party	Candidate	Votes	%
Democratic Party primary results
Democratic	Lloyd Adams	3,662	50.09%
Democratic	Harry C. Mosher	3,649	49.91%
Total votes		7,311	100.00%
Republican Party primary results
Republican	Bill McCune (incumbent)	4,210	53.77%
Republican	Howard Adams (incumbent)	3,620	46.23%
Total votes		7,830	100.00%

General election results
Party	Candidate	Votes	%
Republican	Bill McCune (incumbent)	11,372	32.15%
Republican	Howard Adams (incumbent)	9,777	27.64%
Democratic	Harry C. Mosher	7,207	20.37%
Democratic	Lloyd Adams	7,018	19.84%
Total votes		35,374	100.00%
Republican hold			
Republican hold			

=== District 21 ===
Primary election results
Party	Candidate	Votes	%
Democratic Party primary results
Democratic	Bob Carter	3,843	51.00%
Democratic	Barbara L'Ecuyer	3,693	49.00%
Total votes		7,536	100.00%
Republican Party primary results
Republican	Jay C. Stuckey (incumbent)	5,283	50.66%
Republican	Elizabeth Adams Rockwell (incumbent)	5,146	49.34%
Total votes		10,429	100.00%
American Independent Party primary results
American Independent	William Magnuson	2	100.00%
Total votes		2	100.00%

General election results
Party	Candidate	Votes	%
Republican	Jay C. Stuckey (incumbent)	11,721	29.78%
Republican	Elizabeth Adams Rockwell (incumbent)	11,238	28.55%
Democratic	Barbara L'Ecuyer	8,364	21.25%
Democratic	Bob Carter	8,039	20.42%
Total votes		39,362	100.00%
Republican hold			
Republican hold			

=== District 22 ===
Primary election results
Party	Candidate	Votes	%
Democratic Party primary results
Democratic	R. G. "Danny" Peña	1,996	23.96%
Democratic	Art Hamilton	1,685	20.23%
Democratic	Robert T. Louis	1,380	16.57%
Democratic	Pete C. Barraza Jr.	1,065	12.79%
Democratic	Manuel Burruel	1,001	12.02%
Democratic	W. F. "Pat" Vipperman	695	8.34%
Democratic	Kenny Clise	508	6.10%
Total votes		8,330	100.00%
Republican Party primary results
Republican	William A. Herron	1,298	51.28%
Republican	James L. (Jim) Cassavant	1,233	48.72%
Total votes		2,531	100.00%

General election results
Party	Candidate	Votes	%
Democratic	R. G. "Danny" Peña	7,541	33.09%
Democratic	Art Hamilton	7,159	31.41%
Republican	James L. (Jim) Cassavant	4,054	17.79%
Republican	William A. Herron	4,037	17.71%
Total votes		22,791	100.00%
Democratic gain from Republican			
Democratic gain from Republican			

=== District 23 ===
Primary election results
Party	Candidate	Votes	%
Democratic Party primary results
Democratic	Leon Thompson (incumbent)	2,487	27.58%
Democratic	Tony R. Abril	2,275	25.23%
Democratic	Horace E. Owens (incumbent)	2,140	23.73%
Democratic	Mike Enriquez	2,115	23.46%
Total votes		9,017	100.00%
Republican Party primary results
Republican	Maxine Provost Brubaker	415	100.00%
Total votes		415	100.00%

General election results
Party	Candidate	Votes	%
Democratic	Leon Thompson (incumbent)	7,400	45.40%
Democratic	Tony R. Abril	6,026	36.97%
Republican	Maxine Provost Brubaker	1,649	10.12%
Independent	Juanita Leon	1,226	7.52%
Total votes		16,301	100.00%
Democratic gain from Republican			
Democratic gain from Republican			

=== District 24 ===
Primary election results
Party	Candidate	Votes	%
Democratic Party primary results
Democratic	Carl G. Pettijohn	3,542	50.59%
Democratic	J. L. (Jerry) Horacek	3,460	49.41%
Total votes		7,002	100.00%
Republican Party primary results
Republican	Richard Burgess (incumbent)	6,392	35.69%
Republican	Pete Corpstein	4,519	25.23%
Republican	William Parks	2,818	15.73%
Republican	Ernst C. "Ernie" Sielaff	2,564	14.31%
Republican	Harvey Heyder	1,619	9.04%
Total votes		17,912	100.00%
American Independent Party primary results
American Independent	Betty Mitchell	3	50.00%
American Independent	Carl A. Bullock	3	50.00%
Total votes		6	100.00%

General election results
Party	Candidate	Votes	%
Republican	Richard Burgess (incumbent)	20,199	35.94%
Republican	Pete Corpstein	19,512	34.72%
Democratic	Carl G. Pettijohn	8,837	15.72%
Democratic	J. L. (Jerry) Horacek	7,655	13.62%
Total votes		56,203	100.00%
Republican hold			
Republican hold			

=== District 25 ===
Primary election results
Party	Candidate	Votes	%
Democratic Party primary results
Democratic	Jim Murray	3,584	41.26%
Democratic	Pauline M. Hughes	3,180	36.61%
Democratic	Gerard Belanger	1,923	22.14%
Total votes		8,687	100.00%
Republican Party primary results
Republican	D. Lee Jones (incumbent)	4,279	50.08%
Republican	Jim Skelly (incumbent)	4,265	49.92%
Total votes		8,544	100.00%

General election results
Party	Candidate	Votes	%
Republican	Jim Skelly (incumbent)	10,991	28.51%
Republican	D. Lee Jones (incumbent)	9,950	25.81%
Democratic	Jim Murray	8,843	22.94%
Democratic	Pauline M. Hughes	8,763	22.73%
Total votes		38,547	100.00%
Republican hold			
Republican hold			

=== District 26 ===
Primary election results
Party	Candidate	Votes	%
Democratic Party primary results
Democratic	Barbara E. Dunham	2,555	37.07%
Democratic	William E. Hegarty	2,543	36.90%
Democratic	Betty Anne Jarvi	1,794	26.03%
Total votes		6,892	100.00%
Republican Party primary results
Republican	Frank Kelley (incumbent)	5,723	42.99%
Republican	Peter Kay (incumbent)	4,677	35.14%
Republican	Eric Shane	2,911	21.87%
Total votes		13,311	100.00%
American Independent Party primary results
American Independent	Charlene Brooks	2	100.00%
Total votes		2	100.00%

General election results
Party	Candidate	Votes	%
Republican	Frank Kelley (incumbent)	15,162	33.48%
Republican	Peter Kay (incumbent)	14,229	31.42%
Democratic	William E. Hegarty	8,003	17.67%
Democratic	Barbara E. Dunham	7,892	17.43%
Total votes		45,286	100.00%
Republican hold			
Republican hold			

=== District 27 ===
Primary election results
Party	Candidate	Votes	%
Democratic Party primary results
Democratic	M. E. "Mike" St. George	3,253	50.22%
Democratic	Eliza M. Carney	3,225	49.78%
Total votes		6,478	100.00%
Republican Party primary results
Republican	Michael Goodwin (incumbent)	4,457	51.79%
Republican	Juanita Harelson	4,149	48.21%
Total votes		8,606	100.00%

General election results
Party	Candidate	Votes	%
Republican	Michael Goodwin (incumbent)	14,530	29.74%
Republican	Juanita Harelson	14,019	28.69%
Democratic	Eliza M. Carney	10,175	20.83%
Democratic	M. E. "Mike" St. George	10,134	20.74%
Total votes		48,858	100.00%
Republican gain from Democratic			
Republican gain from Democratic			

=== District 28 ===
Primary election results
Party	Candidate	Votes	%
Democratic Party primary results
Democratic	Earnest F. Romero	2,668	100.00%
Total votes		2,668	100.00%
Republican Party primary results
Republican	Bob Hungerford (incumbent)	6,675	56.84%
Republican	Americo "Mac" Carvalho	5,068	43.16%
Total votes		11,743	100.00%

General election results
Party	Candidate	Votes	%
Republican	Bob Hungerford (incumbent)	18,003	44.35%
Republican	Americo "Mac" Carvalho	14,808	36.48%
Democratic	Earnest F. Romero	7,785	19.18%
Total votes		40,596	100.00%
Republican gain from Democratic			
Republican gain from Democratic			

=== District 29 ===
Primary election results
Party	Candidate	Votes	%
Democratic Party primary results
Democratic	Joseph S. Jarvis	1,870	37.58%
Democratic	James Leo Foran	1,589	31.93%
Democratic	Eileen Romano	1,517	30.49%
Total votes		4,976	100.00%
Republican Party primary results
Republican	Jack J. Taylor	4,120	37.86%
Republican	Jim Cooper (incumbent)	3,577	32.87%
Republican	Dave Hall	3,184	29.26%
Total votes		10,881	100.00%
American Independent Party primary results
American Independent	Thomas C. Bauer	7	100.00%
Total votes		7	100.00%

General election results
Party	Candidate	Votes	%
Republican	Jack J. Taylor	13,148	35.43%
Republican	Jim Cooper (incumbent)	12,030	32.41%
Democratic	Joseph S. Jarvis	6,388	17.21%
Democratic	James Leo Foran	5,548	14.95%
Total votes		37,114	100.00%
Republican hold			
Republican hold			

=== District 30 ===
Primary election results
Party	Candidate	Votes	%
Democratic Party primary results
Democratic	Charles A. Russell	2,704	51.19%
Democratic	Barbara A. Stribling	2,578	48.81%
Total votes		5,282	100.00%
Republican Party primary results
Republican	James J. Sossaman (incumbent)	3,655	36.02%
Republican	Carl J. Kunasek	2,504	24.68%
Republican	Frank C. Rowland	1,628	16.04%
Republican	H. Lavon Payne	1,388	13.68%
Republican	"Little Joe" Saggio	972	9.58%
Total votes		10,147	100.00%

General election results
Party	Candidate	Votes	%
Republican	James J. Sossaman (incumbent)	12,514	34.56%
Republican	Carl J. Kunasek	11,182	30.89%
Democratic	Barbara A. Stribling	6,506	17.97%
Democratic	Charles A. Russell	6,003	16.58%
Total votes		36,205	100.00%
Republican hold			
Republican hold			
