= Sonny Borrelli =

American politician

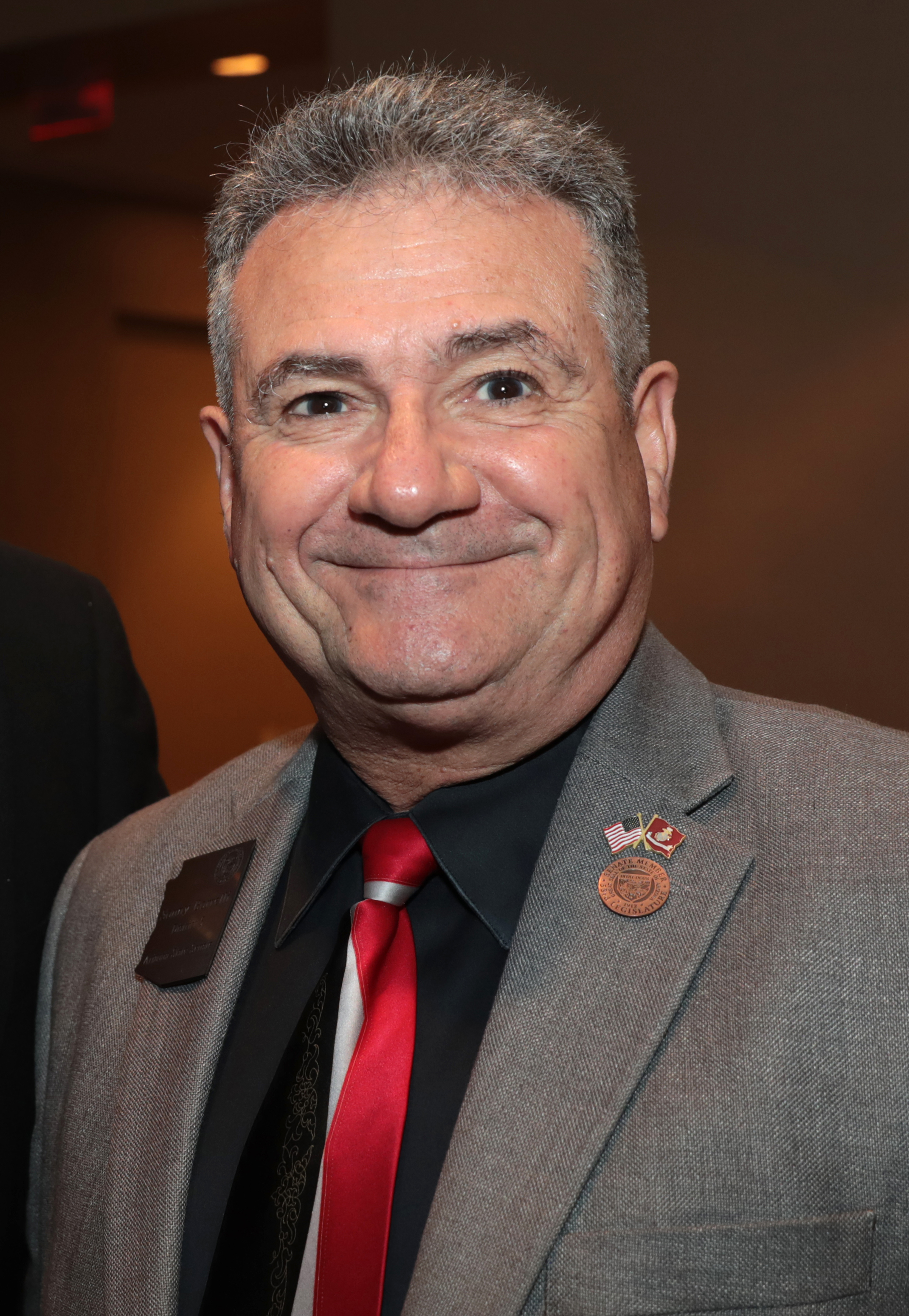
- Borrelli in 2019

Majority Leader of the Arizona Senate
- In office January 9, 2023 – January 13, 2025
- Preceded by: Rick Gray
- Succeeded by: Janae Shamp

Member of the Arizona Senate
- In office January 9, 2023 – January 13, 2025
- Preceded by: Sue Donahue
- Succeeded by: Hildy Angius
- Constituency: 5th district (2017–2023); 30th district (2023–2025)

Member of the Arizona House of Representatives from the 5th district
- In office January 14, 2013 – January 9, 2017
- Preceded by: Brenda Barton; Chester Crandell
- Succeeded by: Paul Mosley

Personal details
- Born: New York, U.S.
- Party: Republican

Sonny Borrelli is an American politician and a Republican former member of the Arizona Senate, representing the 30th district. He was the Senate Majority Leader from 2023 to 2025. Borrelli formerly served in the Arizona House of Representatives as a representative of District 5, from January 14, 2013, to January 9, 2017.

== Early life and career ==
Borrelli was a U.S. Marine from 1977 to 1999. He moved to Arizona in 2000 and was a member of the Lake Havasu City Council from 2010 to 2012.

== Political career ==
In the Arizona House of Representatives, Borrelli was chair of the Military Affairs and Public Safety Committee. In the Senate he has been chair of the Government Committee and Majority Whip.

=== Elections ===
In 2012, with incumbent Republican Representatives Chester Crandell running for Arizona Senate and Brenda Barton redistricted to District 6, and with incumbent Republican Representative Doris Goodale redistricted from District 3, Borrelli ran in the four-way August 28, 2012 Republican primary, placing second with 8,672 votes, and won the second seat in the November 6, 2012 general election with 35,154 votes above Democratic nominee P. L. Durbin.

In 2014 Borrelli and Regina Cobb defeated Jennifer Jones, Sam Medrano and George Schnittgrund in the Republican primary. Borrelli and Cobb defeated Longoria and Weisser in the general election with Borrelli receiving 31,277 votes.

=== 2020 presidential election ===
Following the 2020 United States presidential election, Borrelli supported the "Stop the Steal" movement which falsely claimed that Donald Trump won the election nationally and in Arizona.

== Legal history ==
In 2001, Borrelli was charged with "class 1 misdemeanor assault with domestic violence" after an altercation with his then-wife; he pleaded guilty to "class 1 misdemeanor disorderly conduct charge tagged with domestic violence", and served 1 day in prison. He subsequently explained that his then-wife had been experiencing a "meltdown" and "psychotic episode", that her injuries had been self-inflicted, and that he had plea-bargained because otherwise he risked losing custody of his son.

Arizona Senate
Preceded by Rick Gray	Majority Leader of the Arizona Senate; 2023–2025	Succeeded by Janae Shamp
