= John Conlan (American politician) =

American politician (1930–2021)

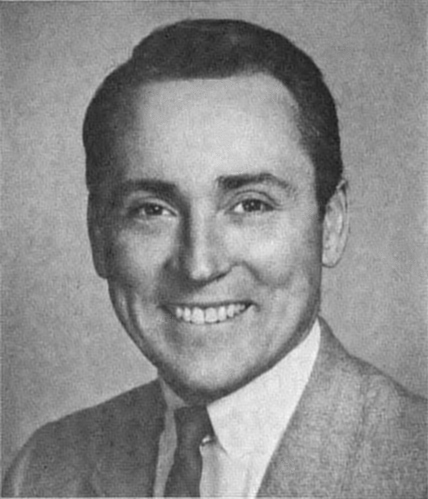
- Official portrait, 1973

Member of the U.S. House of Representatives from Arizona's 4th district
- In office January 3, 1973 – January 3, 1977
- Preceded by: District created
- Succeeded by: Eldon D. Rudd

Member of the Arizona Senate
- In office January 1, 1965 – January 1, 1973
- Preceded by: multi-member district
- Succeeded by: Howard S. Baldwin
- Constituency: Maricopa County (1965–1967); 8th district, Seat C (1967–1971); 21st district (1971–1973)

Personal details
- Born: September 17, 1930 Oak Park, Illinois, U.S.
- Died: June 18, 2021 (aged 90) Asheville, North Carolina, U.S.
- Party: Republican
- Education: Northwestern University (BS); Harvard University (LLB)

Military service
- Allegiance: United States
- Branch/service: United States Army
- Years of service: 1956-1961
- Rank: Captain

John Bertrand Conlan (September 17, 1930 – June 18, 2021) was an American lawyer and Republican politician. He served as a State Senator from 1965 to 1972 and as a United States representative from Arizona from 1973 to 1977.

== Early life and career ==
Born in Oak Park, Illinois, Conlan was the son of Ruth (Anderson) and Hall of Fame baseball umpire Jocko Conlan. He attended Illinois public schools and received a B.S. from Northwestern University, where he joined Delta Upsilon. He later graduated from Harvard Law School, received a Fulbright Scholarship to study at the University of Cologne, and studied at The Hague Academy of International Law. Conlan was admitted to the Illinois bar in 1954 and commenced practice in Chicago. He then served as a captain in the U.S. Army from 1956 to 1961. Conlan has also taught geo-politics and American foreign policy at Arizona State University and the University of Maryland. He continued to practice law in Phoenix, Arizona. Conlan served in the Arizona Senate from 1965 to 1973.

== U.S. House of Representatives ==
In 1976, he ran for the United States Senate to succeed retiring Republican Senator Paul Fannin. He was opposed in the Republican primary by fellow U.S. Representative Sam Steiger which Conlan narrowly lost. The general election was won by former Pima County Attorney Dennis DeConcini.

During his time in Congress, he became a critic of the elementary school curriculum known as Man: A Course of Study, which taught students about the lifestyle and culture of the Netsilik Inuit. At its peak in 1972, the curriculum was being taught to 400,000 students nationwide. Conlan claimed the program had an ideological bias and promoted cultural relativism. This ignited a controversy centered in Phoenix, Arizona, that led the National Science Foundation to cut funding for the curriculum in 1975, after which it ceased to be used.

He died on June 18, 2021, in Asheville, North Carolina, at age 90.

U.S. House of Representatives
Preceded by District created	Member of the U.S. House of Representatives from Arizona's 4th congressional district January 3, 1973 – January 3, 1977	Succeeded by Eldon D. Rudd
