= Regina Cobb =

American politician and dentist

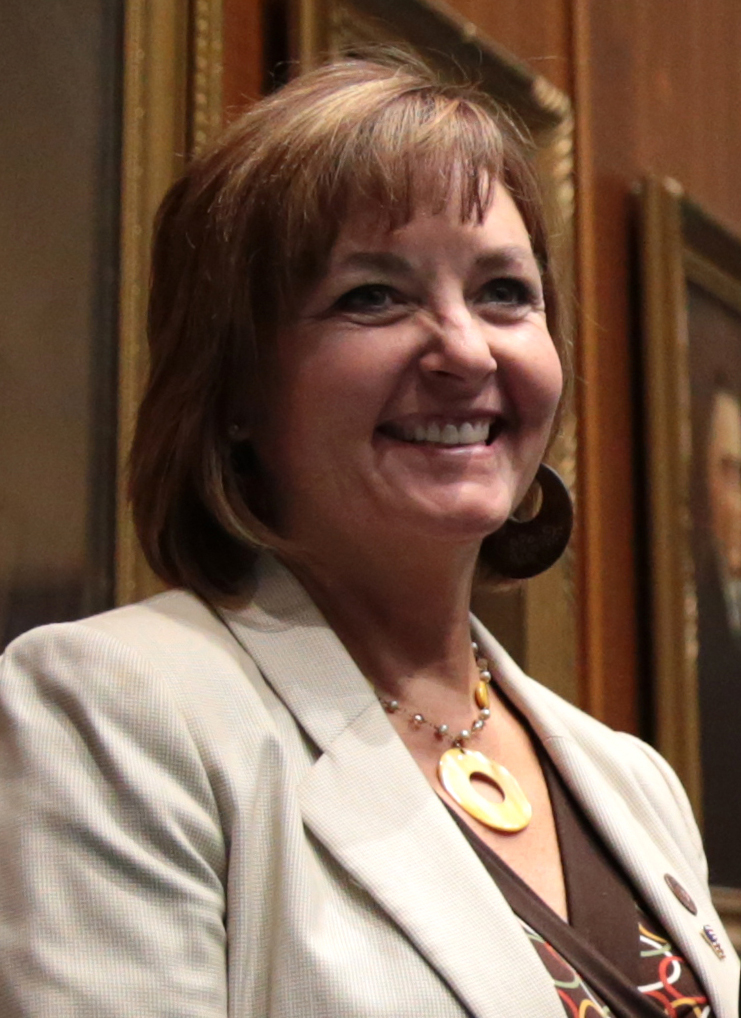

Member of the Arizona House of Representatives from the 5th district
- In office January 5, 2015 – January 9, 2023
- Preceded by: Doris Goodale
- Succeeded by: Amish Shah

Personal details
- Party: Republican

Regina Cobb is a former Republican member of the Arizona House of Representatives representing Arizona's Legislative District Five.

A dentist, she graduated from Case Western Reserve University in 1993 and currently practices at Kingman, Arizona. She was President of the Arizona Dental Association in 2009.

She was a candidate in the 2022 Arizona State Treasurer election, but withdrew the 1st of September, 2021.

== Elections ==
- 2014 - Cobb and Sonny Borrelli defeated Jennifer Jones, Sam Medrano and George Schnittgrund in the Republican primary. Borrelli and Cobb defeated Longoria and Weisser in the general election with Borrelli receiving 31,277 votes.
