= SCR 1044 =

Arizona Immigration Legislation

Arizona Legislator
- Long title: SCR 1044 or Arizona In-State Tuition for Non-Citizen Resident Measure is on the November 8, 2022 Arizona ballot as a legislatively referred statue.
- Passed: May 10, 2021
- Bill citation: Full Text of SCR 1044
- Introduced by: Senators Paul Boyer : Sean Bowie, T. J. Shope; Representative Michelle Udall
- Status: Pending

The Senate Concurrent Resolution 1044 (SCR 1044) or Arizona In-State Tuition for Non-Citizen Resident Measure is a legislatively referred state statute on the ballot for the November 8, 2022 election in Arizona. SCR 1044 would repeal provisions of Proposition 300 passed in 2006. SCR 1044 would give voters the opportunity to allow all students, including Arizonan Dreamers, to receive in-state college tuition when a student (a) attended a school in Arizona for a minimum of two years and (b) graduated from a public school, private school, or homeschool in Arizona.

There are approximately 2,000 Dreamers who graduate from an Arizona high school each year. The Intermountain American Business Immigration Coalition, which advocates for immigrants and their economical contributions, and Aliento, an Arizona based immigrant advocacy group, state the ban of Proposition 300 in 2006 has deprived undocumented students of a college education due to cost, which also diminishes their contribution to Arizona's contribution. Reports of economical benefits from a non-partisan and evidence based policy briefs and reports from College Success Arizona states, "it is estimated that every college graduate earning a four-year university degree contributes $660,000 more to the economy than just high school graduates and the lifetime tax receipts for university graduates are estimated at $381,000." Legislature states that SCR 1044 will not impact the state general fund.

If SCR 1044 is passed, Arizona would join 19 other states including Utah, Colorado, Nevada and Texas that have passed similar legislation offering in-state tuition to certain non-citizen residents. The measure will also exempt postsecondary education from the definition of a state and local benefit, which students without lawful immigration status can't currently access.

== Ballot path ==
SCR 1044 is the result of years of grassroots organizing and bipartisan leadership campaigning for its passage in the business, education, religious, and other civic sectors. The ballot measure was sponsored by State Sen. Paul Boyer, R-Glendale, State Sen. T. J Shope, State Sen. Sean Bowie, and Representative Michelle Udall into the Arizona State Legislature in 2021.

=== The Senate Vote ===
The Arizona State Senate voted 17-13 to pass the ballot measure on March 4, 2021. The Senate vote was composed of Senate Democrats and three Senate Republicans helping put the measure in the November 2022 ballot. The remaining Senate Republicans opposed the measure.

=== The House of Representative Vote ===
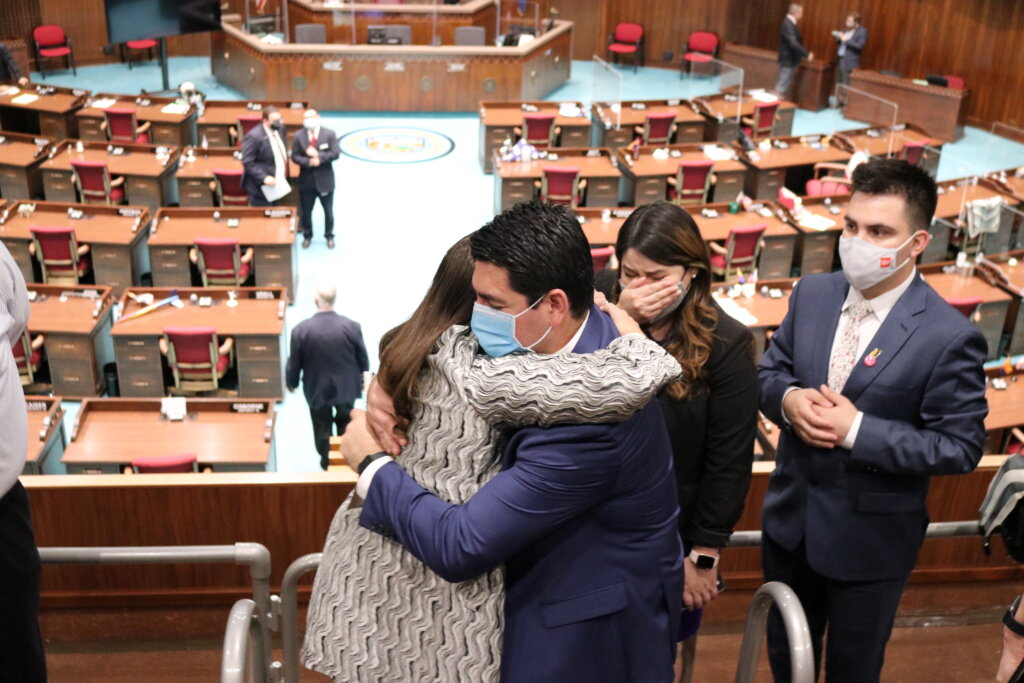
Rep. Michelle Udall embraces Jose Patiño, an immigrant leader, while ALIENTO founder Reyna Montoya (right) cries inside the gallery of the House of Representatives after SCR 1044 passed 33-27.

The Arizona House of Representatives voted 33-27 to approve SCR 1044 on May 10, 2021. The House vote was composed of House Democrats and four House Republicans that supported the measure, while the remaining 27 Republicans opposed it. With the approval in the Senate and House the proposal was referred to the ballot for November 8, 2022.

=== Organizations ===
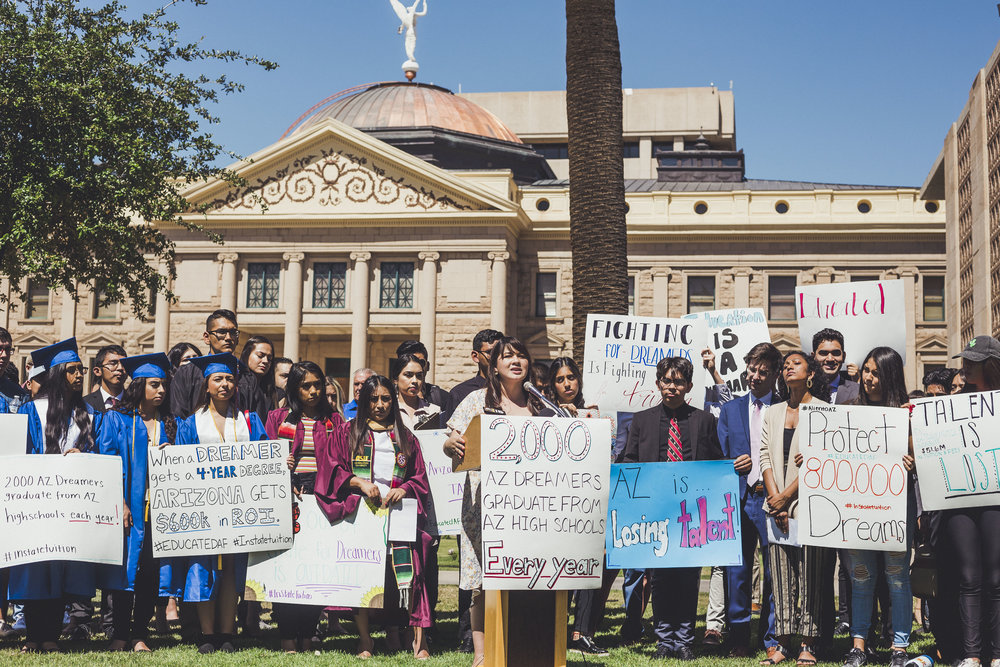
Aliento's Reyna Montoya speaking in one of her many visits the Arizona State Capital to certify a ballot measure that would allow undocumented students to pay the same tuition rate as Arizona residents.

Aliento's founder and CEO Reyna Montoya, organized 250 students, teachers, and community members from across the valley to talk to advocate for tuition access for all Arizonan high-school graduates regardless of immigration status. Beatriz Limón, an independent journalist, stated the key role Reyna Montoya played leading Aliento's grassroots organizing to secure the passage of SCR 1044. Limón stated, "These young Dreamers made multiple trips to the Arizona State Capitol and were key to convincing lawmakers of the benefits of supporting higher education." Reyna Montoya is a 2016 Soros Justice Fellow, a 2017 Echoing Green Fellow, a Forbes: 30 Under 30 Social Entrepreneur, and an ATHENA 2019 recipient by the Greater Phoenix Chamber of Commerce among many other awards.

Reyna Montoya has been a tireless advocate for undocumented immigrants. She has been early part of the tuition access regardless of immigration status movement. In 2019, Reyna Montoya received bipartisan support from former Republican State Senator, Heather Carter, the chair of the Higher Education and Workforce Development Committee, to try and pass a bill that proposed directing the state’s public colleges and universities to create a special tuition rate for students who graduated from Arizona high schools but did not qualify as in-state residents, a group that would have included Dreamers. Heather Carter lost her re-election campaign which was a setback for the movements progress. Reyna Montoya and Dallin Adams, ABIC’s Intermountain Coalition Director, in 2021 got more than 130 business, faith, and civic leaders to sign an open letter to the Speaker of the Arizona House of Representatives Russell "Rusty" Bowers, asking him to hold a vote on SCR 1044 "as soon as possible" so that it could appear on the ballot in November 2022. The letter helped convinced Republican State Sen. Paul Boyer to introduce the legislation in February in 2021. The passing of SCR 1044 was a victory for the movement. Reyna Montoya is working on the next steps to ensure the passing of SCR 1044. She stated “We’re taking the first steps towards building a larger coalition of leaders in Arizona. There is a lot to educate people about as far as policy goes, but we want to be very specific and only focus on the vote for in-state university tuition.”

== Background Timeline ==
1982: Plyler v. Doe Court Case was heard by the Supreme Court. One June 1982, the Supreme Court issued on the case, Plyler v. Doe, a landmark decision holding that states cannot constitutionally deny students a free public education based on immigration status. By a 5-4 decision, the Court found that the benefits of educating undocumented children outweighed the harms that it will create for society at large if they were to be denied from obtaining an education.

1996: In 1996 Congress enacted two immigration-related acts that were intended to restrict welfare and public benefits for undocumented immigrants. These were the Personal Responsibility and Work Opportunity Reconciliation Act (“PRWORA”) and the Illegal Immigration Reform and Immigrant Responsibility Act (“IIRIRA”). PRWORA defines undocumented immigrants’ eligibility for state and local public benefits and generally allows states to define that eligibility. This meant states can choose if undocumented students can pay in-state tuition.

2006: Prop 300 was passed. Prop 300 banned undocumented students from in-state tuition & scholarships November 7, 2006 - Arizona voters passed Prop. 300, which banned instate tuition and merit based scholarships for undocumented students. After Prop. 300, Maricopa County Community College District (MCCCD) and other community colleges allowed reduced tuition for undocumented students who were taking 7 credit hours or less. After 7 credit hours they were charged out-of-state tuition.

2009: HB 2008 was passed and it prevented community colleges to subsidize tuition rates. August 2009, After Prop. 300 passed, the community colleges allowed lower tuition rates to undocumented students as long as they took 7 credits or less per semester. The Arizona Legislature then passed HB 2008 (attached by to the budget) denying the community colleges to grant resident tuition for undocumented students (this happened before the DACA program existed).

2011:Tuition Raise at MCCCD. On June 22, 2011 MCCCD voted to raise tuition for undocumented students from $76 per credit hour to $317.

2012: On June 15, 2012 the Deferred Action for Childhood Arrivals (DACA) program was announced by President Obama, which enable certain undocumented youth to obtain a 2 year program which protected the from deportation if they met certain criteria. MCCCD accepts DACA work permits as a valid ID for students to pay in-state tuition. As of September 2012 Maricopa County Community College District Board allowed DACA recipients to pay in-state tuition.

2013: Tom Horne, attorney general filed a lawsuit against MCCCD. On June 18, 2013, AZ AG, Tom Horne files a lawsuit to block one of the nation's largest community-college systems from providing reduced tuition to young immigrants who were granted the DACA program.

2015: Maricopa Community Colleges decided to move forward with an appeal. On May 5, 2015, Judge Arthur Anderson ruled that the Arizona law doesn't bar benefits to immigrants who are lawfully in the country and according to federal law DACA students are lawfully present. Arizona Board of Regents (ABOR) allowed instate tuition for DACA recipients and also passed a resolution to provide 150% tuition rate for DACA students.

2017: The state of Arizona appeals the decision made by the district. On June 20, 2017, Arizona Court of Appeals overturned a ruling that allowed young immigrants who were granted protection from deportation by the DACA program to pay in-state tuition at the state's public colleges and universities. DACA is terminated by Donald Trump's Administration. September 5, 2017 Attorney General Jeff Sessions announces that the DACA program is rescinded. Several states file lawsuits which reopened the ability for existing DACA recipients to renew their application. The outcome of the case is still pending.

2018: On April 2, 2018 the Arizona Supreme Court heard the instate tuition case to determine whether DACA recipients can pay in-state tuition in Arizona. On April 9, 2018 the Arizona Supreme Court Judges ruled that Dreamers & DACA recipients are not eligible for instate tuition. Starting the fall of 2018 MCCCD started charging DACA & undocumented students out-of-state tuition and all students at the three public universities who have DACA have to pay a 150% rate.

2019: Heather Carter introduces Senate Bill 1217 that would allow public universities and community colleges to set a new tuition rate for every student who graduates from an Arizona high school, regardless of immigration status. The Senate Bill passed through the Senate but House Speaker Russell "Rusty" Bowers stopped it.

2021: SCR 1044 is passed by Arizona's House of Representatives and Senate.

== Reactions ==
=== Political Reactions ===
Supporters of the bill include State Representatives Cesar Chavez (D), David Cook (R), Jennifer Jermaine (D), Joel John (R), Raquel Terán (D), Michelle Udall (R), House Minority Leader Charlene Fernandez (D), and Superintendent of Public Instruction Kathy Hoffman (D). Rep. Michelle Udall stated “We need more college educated teachers, health care workers, lawyers, engineers and a host of other occupations.” The youth this bill seeks to help shouldn't be blamed or judged based on others' actions. They were brought here as minors, as children.”

Opponents of the bill include State Representatives Leo Biasiucci (R), Joseph Chaplik (R), and John Fillmore (R). Showing his disapproval, Rep. John Fillmore (R) stated “I believe this policy that we are embarking on here is misguided, unfortunate, unneeded and is actually detrimental to the welfare of my county. Americans should not have to pay for non-American citizens, illegals, giving them favored status for their trespass and invasion into America.”

=== Organizations ===
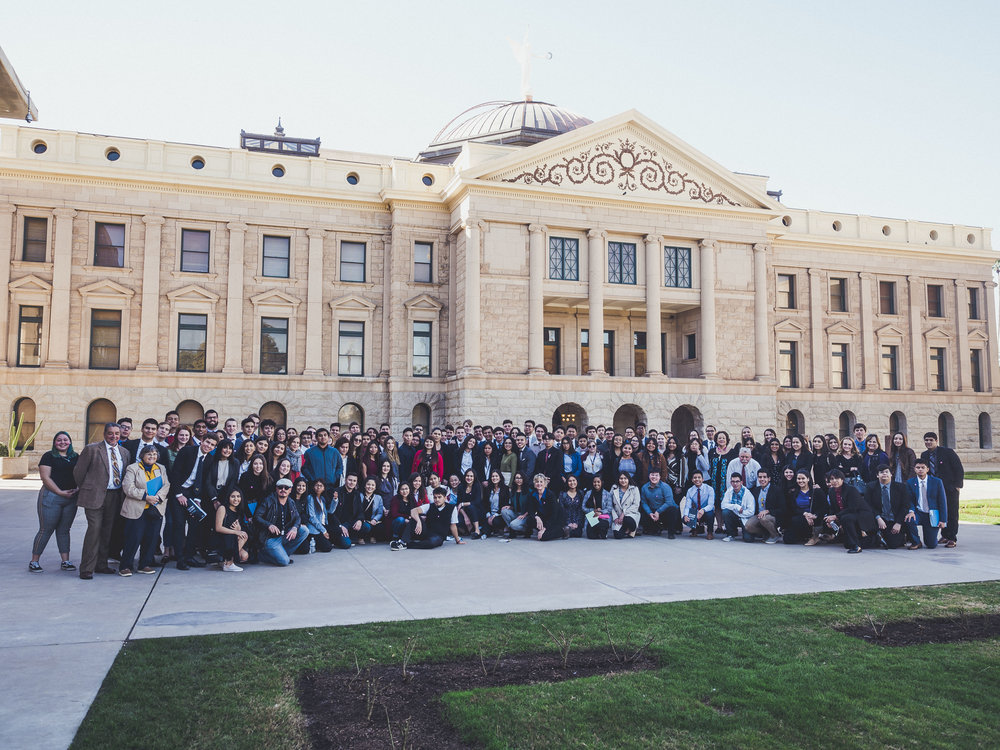
ALIENTO organizes 250 students, educators and allies from across the valley to show up to the Arizona Capitol for Education Day to speak with both Democrats and Republicans about the importance of tuition equity on January 23, 2019.

Aliento, is a nonprofit community organization based in Arizona with a national reach that transforms trauma into hope and action with the dreamers, mixed immigration status families, the immigrant community, and allies through arts & healing programs, leadership development opportunities, and advocacy. Aliento rejoiced the passing of the referral bill which they were advocates of. Aliento released a statement which said "Aliento strongly believes that all people who graduate from Arizona high schools, both public and private, should have the opportunity to enroll in an Arizona university or community college as an in-state resident. This bill specifically applies to all Arizona high school graduates, including our Arizona dreamers, who have lived here for at least 2 years and graduated from an Arizona high school."

The Intermountain American Business Immigration Coalition (ABIC), which represents a growing group of business, faith, and immigrant advocates from Arizona, Utah, Colorado and Nevada, is another strong supporter of SCR 1044.

An Arizona campaign Become Arizona, a bipartisan coalition of education, business, faith, and civic leaders, is an advocate for passing the SCR 1044. The campaign is a working on ensuring the voters are educated on the SCR 1044 and sway support for the passage of SCR 1044 in the 2022 election.
