= Mitzi Epstein =

American politician

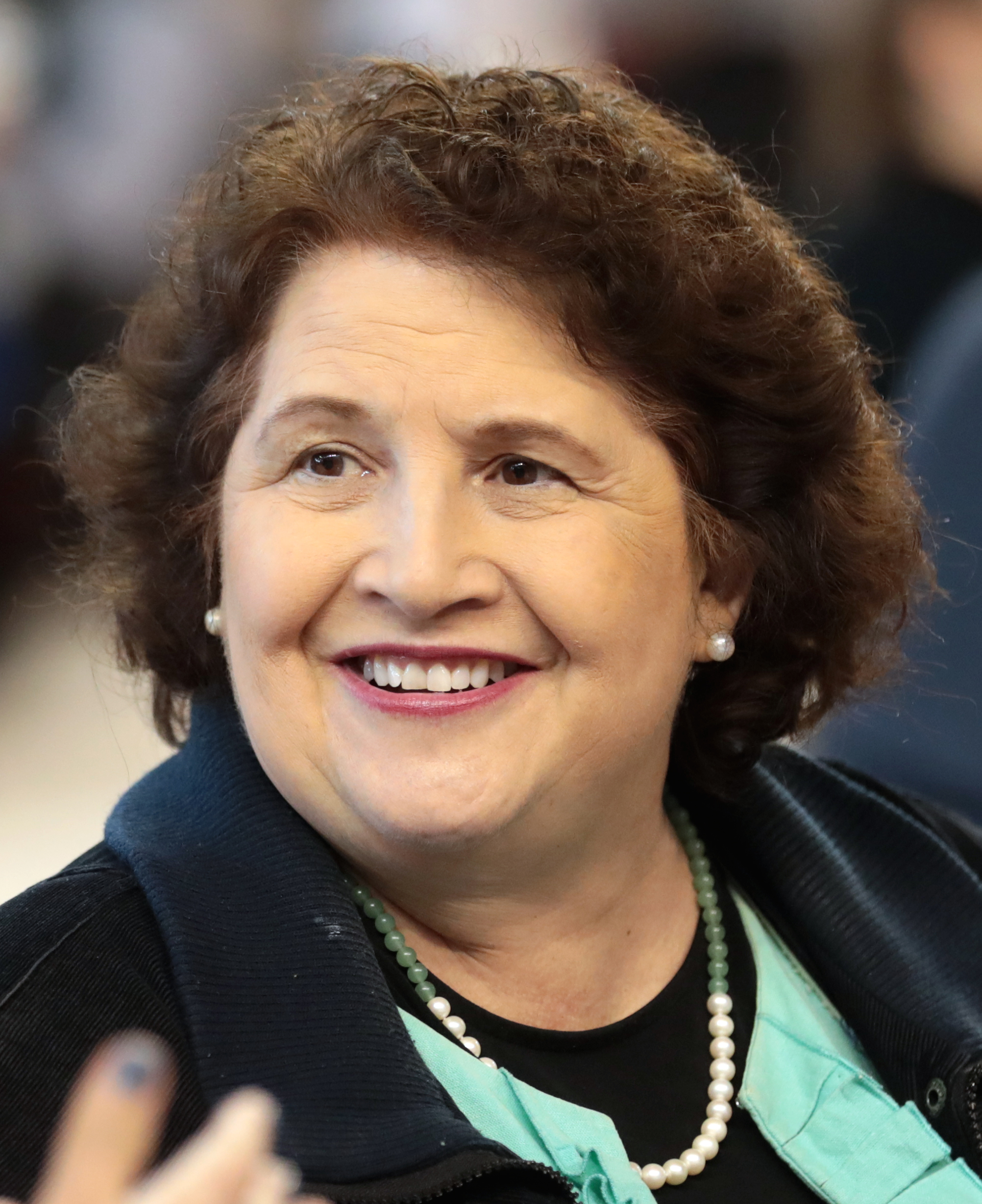
- Epstein in 2023

Minority Leader of the Arizona Senate
- In office March 2, 2023 – January 13, 2025
- Preceded by: Raquel Terán
- Succeeded by: Priya Sundareshan

Member of the Arizona Senate from the 12th district
- Incumbent
- Assumed office January 9, 2023
- Preceded by: Warren Petersen

Member of the Arizona House of Representatives from the 18th district
- In office January 9, 2017 – January 9, 2023 Serving with Jennifer Jermaine
- Preceded by: Bob Robson
- Succeeded by: Christopher Mathis

Personal details
- Party: Democratic
- Education: Bradley University (BS); Washington University (MBA)
- Website: Campaign website

Denise "Mitzi" Epstein is an American politician and a Democratic member of the Arizona Senate elected to represent District 12 in 2022. She was previously elected to the Arizona House of Representatives to represent District 18 in 2016. She is also a computer Systems Analyst and served on the Kyrene Elementary School District Governing Board from 2005 until 2008. She was selected to serve as Minority Leader of the Arizona Senate in March 2023.

== Education ==
Epstein received a bachelor's degree in computer science from Bradley University.

== Elections ==
- 2016 – Epstein and Republican incumbent Jill Norgaard defeated Republican incumbent Bob Robson in the general election.
- 2014 – Epstein lost the District 18 house election to Republican incumbent Bob Robson and Republican Jill Norgaard.

Arizona Senate
Preceded by Raquel Terán	Minority Leader of the Arizona Senate; 2023–2025	Succeeded by Priya Sundareshan
