= Quantá Crews =

American politician

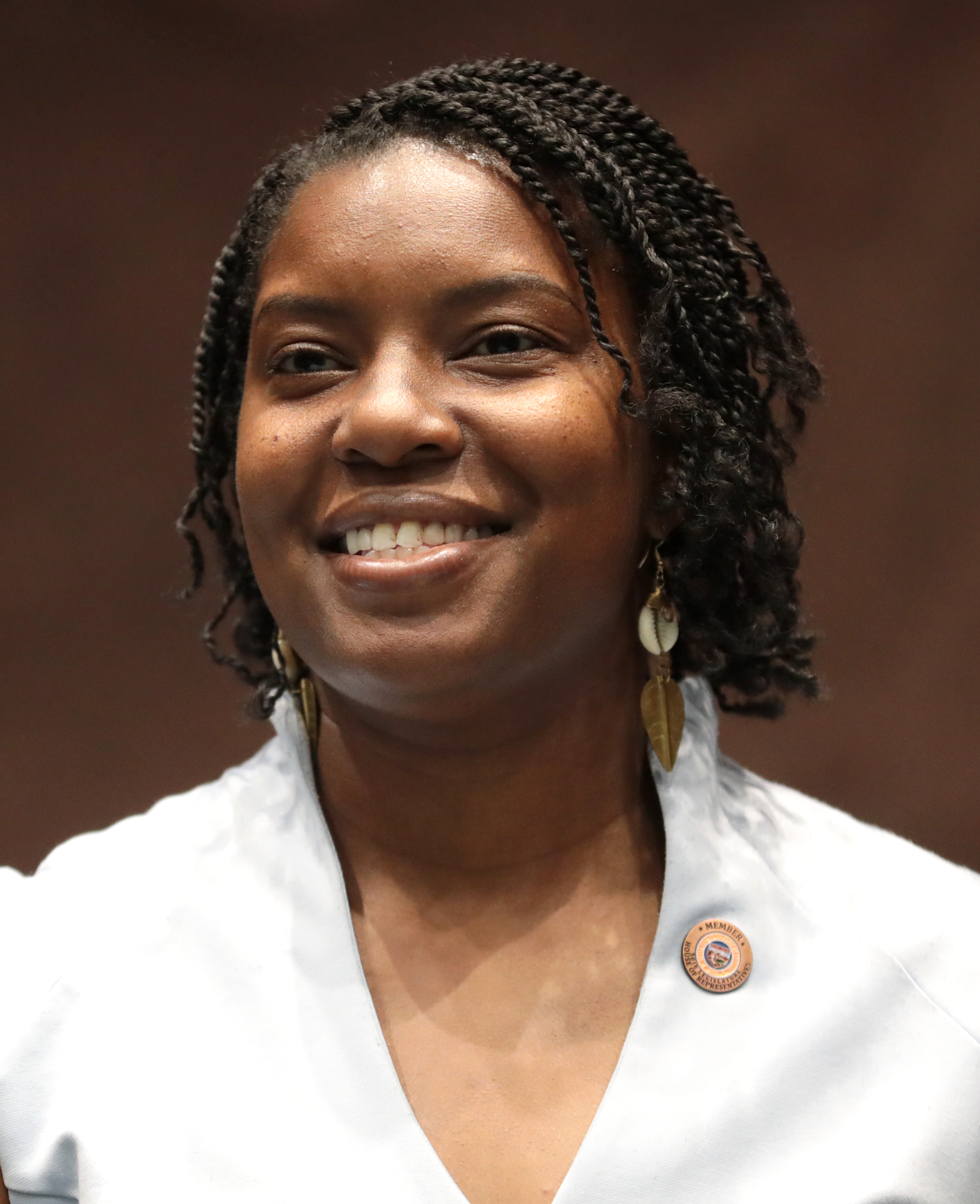
- Crews in 2023

Member of the Arizona House of Representatives from the 26th district
- Incumbent
- Assumed office June 7, 2023 Serving with Cesar Aguilar
- Preceded by: Flavio Bravo

Personal details
- Party: Democratic
- Education: Grand Canyon University

Quantá Crews is an American politician, minister, real estate appraiser, and former property tax appraiser for county and state government. She is a member for the 26th district of the Arizona House of Representatives, alongside Cesar Aguilar, since 2023. On June 5, 2023, she was appointed to the position, replacing incumbent Representative Flavio Bravo, who was appointed to the Arizona Senate.

== Life and career ==
Crews was born in Wayne County, Michigan. Crews received a bachelor's degree from Grand Canyon University. Prior to being selected to serve in the Arizona House of Representatives, Crews served as a property tax appraiser for various government offices, as well as a real estate appraiser. She is also a minister at Historic Tanner Chapel in Phoenix.

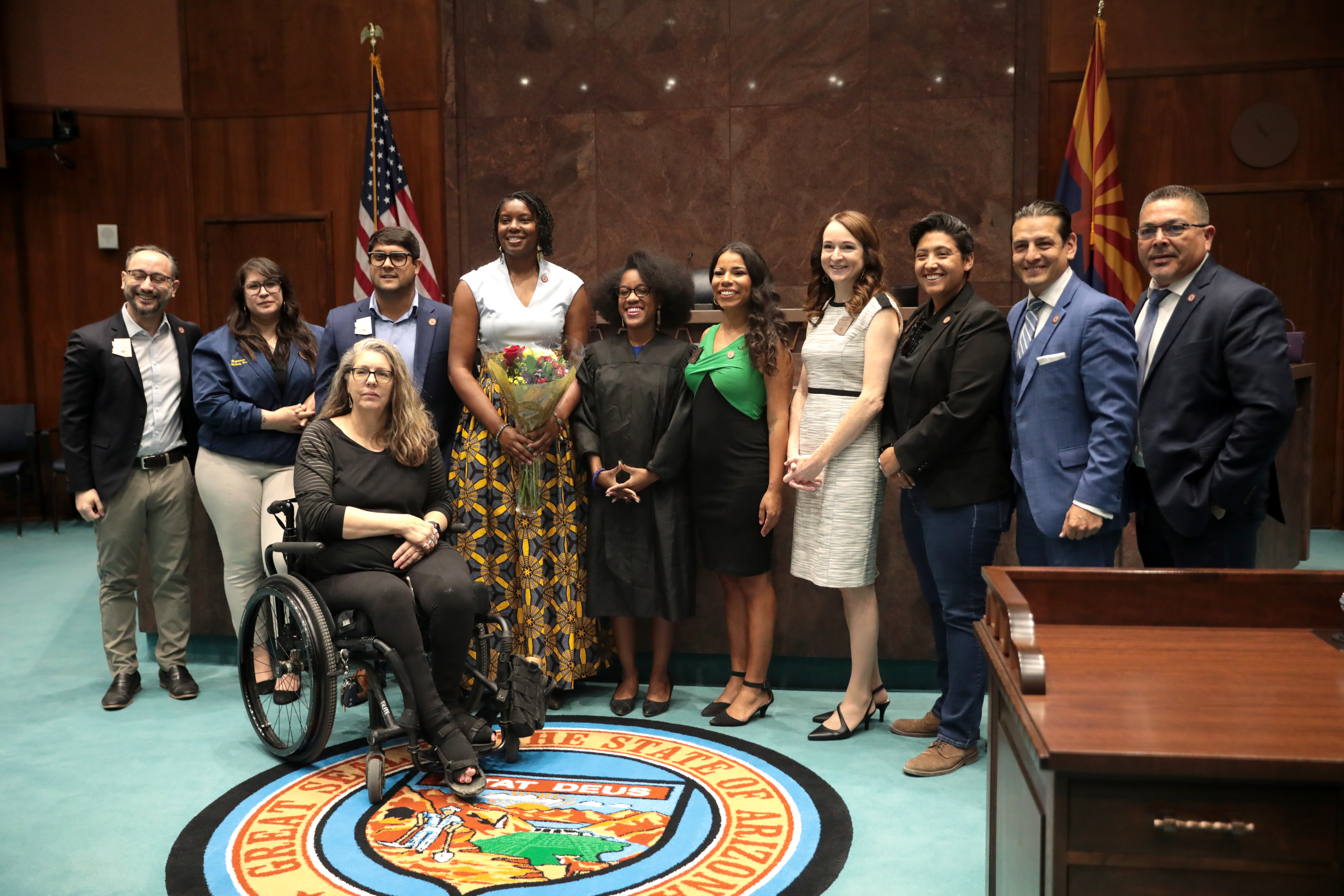
Seth Blattman, Melody Hernandez, Cesar Aguilar, Jennifer Longdon, Quanta Crews, Elaissia Sears, Analise Ortiz, Laura Terech, Lorena Austin, Marcelino Quinonez & Lupe Contreras at her inauguration

On June 5, 2023, Crews was selected by the Maricopa County Board of Supervisors to serve in the House of Representatives, to replace Flavio Bravo, who was selected to serve in the Arizona Senate following the resignation of State Senator Raquel Terán. She was nominated by Supervisor Steve Gallardo, and her appointment was approved by a vote of 4–0, beating out former State Representative Christian Solorio and Veronica Monge. Prior to the appointment, Crews had also been considered to replace Terán, but was ultimately not chosen in favor of Bravo. Crews is also a Democratic precinct committeewoman for the 26th legislative district.
