= Flavio Bravo =

American politician

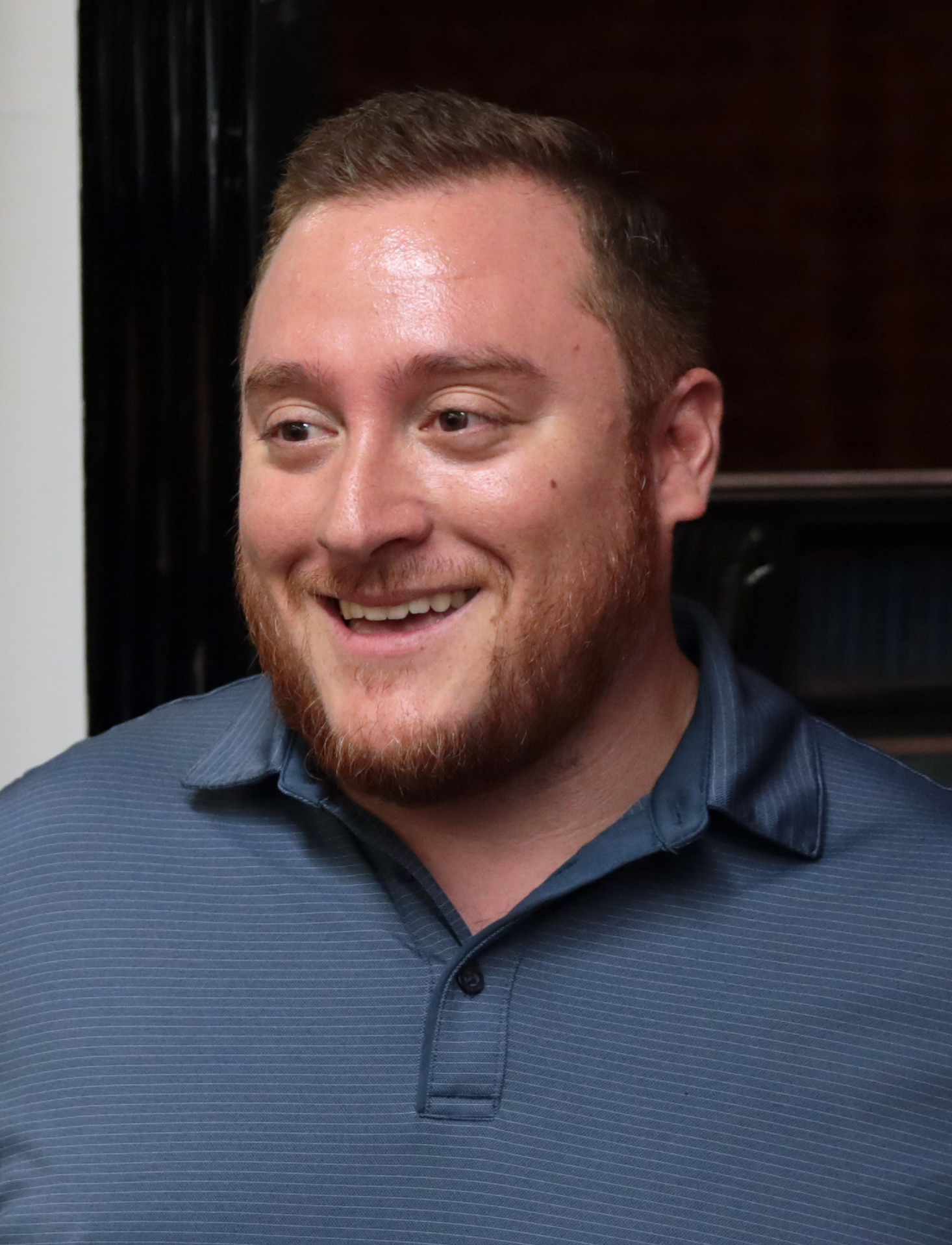
- Bravo in 2022

Member of the Arizona Senate from the 26th district
- Incumbent
- Assumed office May 8, 2023
- Preceded by: Raquel Terán

Member of the Arizona House of Representatives from the 26th district
- In office January 9, 2023 – May 8, 2023 Serving with Cesar Aguilar
- Preceded by: Athena Salman
- Succeeded by: Quantá Crews

Personal details
- Party: Democratic
- Education: Loyola University Chicago (BA); University of San Francisco (MA)

Flavio Bravo is an American politician. He is a Democratic member representing the 26th district of the Arizona Senate, after being appointed to the position following the resignation of Raquel Terán. He previously served in the Arizona House of Representatives from January to May 2023.

== Life and career ==
Bravo was raised in Phoenix, Arizona. He attended and graduated from both Loyola University Chicago (where he also served as student body president) and the University of San Francisco.

In August 2022, Bravo defeated incumbent State Representative Christian Solorio and Gil Hacohen in the Democratic primary election for the 26th district of the Arizona House of Representatives. In November 2022, he was elected along with Cesar Aguilar in the general election. He assumed office in 2023. After serving in the House of Representatives from January to May 2023, he was selected by the Maricopa County Board of Supervisors to replace Raquel Terán in the Arizona Senate following her resignation, taking office on May 8, 2023.

In 2024, the Arizona Chamber of Commerce and Industry named Bravo State Senator of the Year.
