= Cesar Aguilar =

American politician

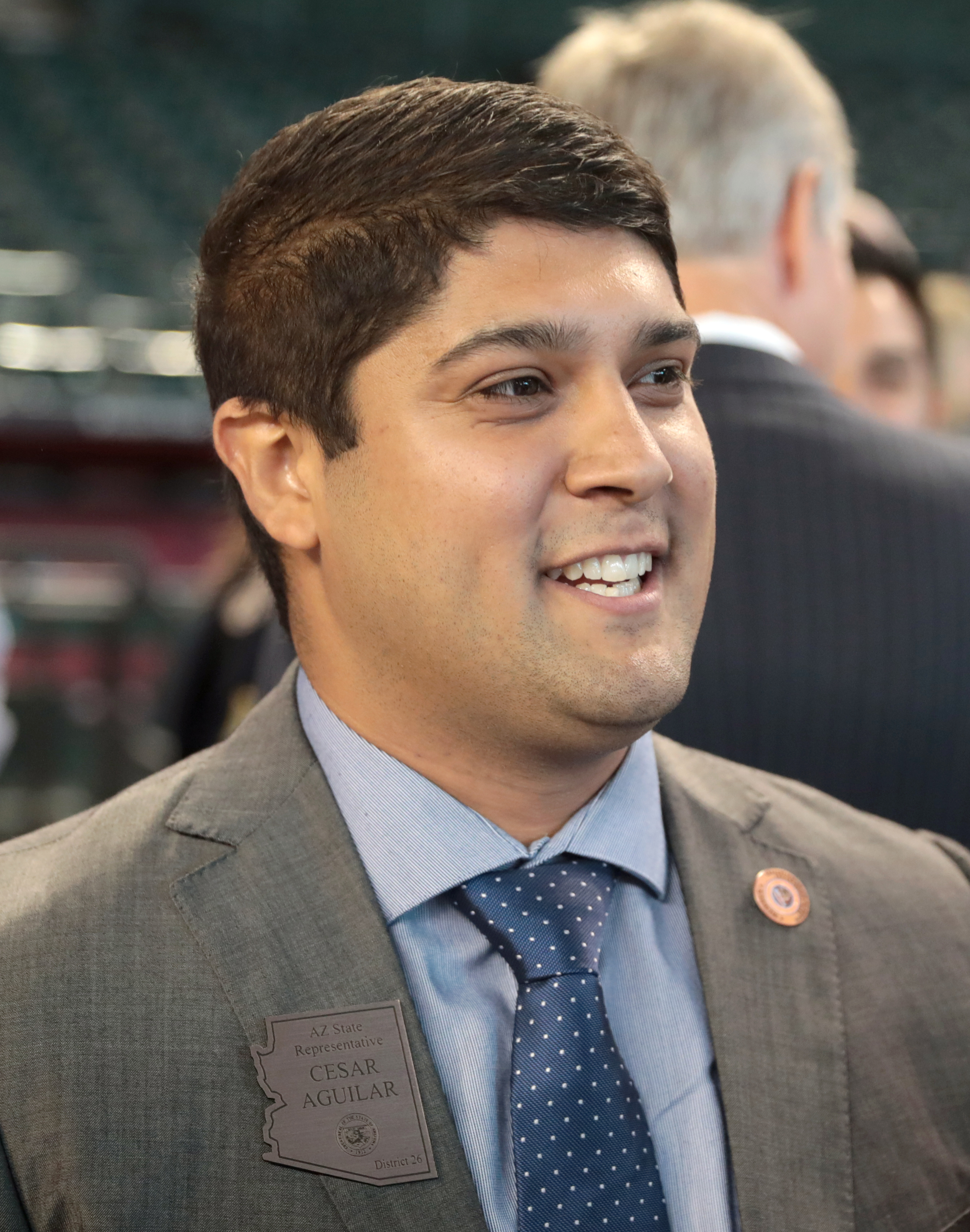
- Aguilar in 2023

Member of the Arizona House of Representatives from the 26th district
- Incumbent
- Assumed office January 9, 2023 Serving with Quantá Crews
- Preceded by: Melody Hernandez

Personal details
- Born: Phoenix, Arizona, U.S.
- Party: Democratic
- Education: Northern Arizona University

Cesar Aguilar is an American politician. He is a member for the 26th district of the Arizona House of Representatives, alongside Quantá Crews, since 2023.

== Life and career ==
Aguilar was born in Phoenix, Arizona. He attended Northern Arizona University.

In August 2022, Aguilar defeated Christian Solorio and Gil Hacohen in the Democratic primary election for the 26th district of the Arizona House of Representatives. In November 2022, he was elected along with Flavio Bravo in the general election. He assumes office in 2023.
