= Jill Norgaard =

American politician

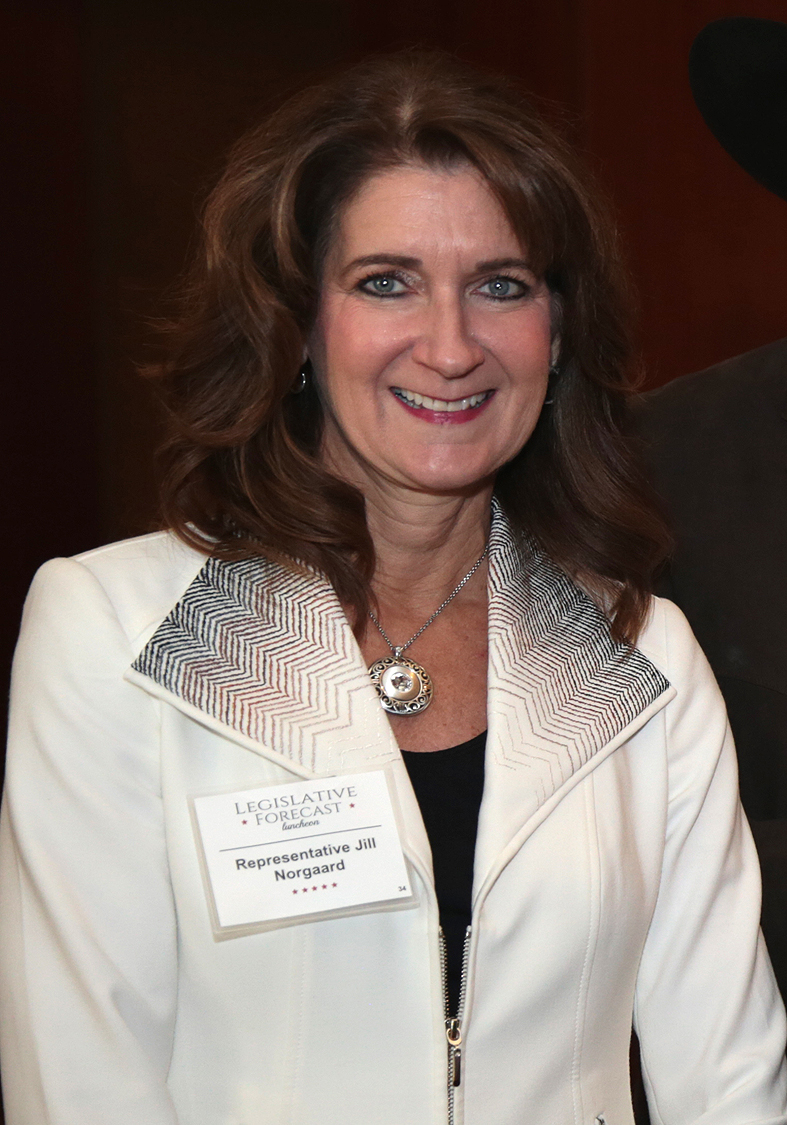
- Norgaard in 2018

Chair of the Arizona Republican Party
- Acting
- In office January 24, 2024 – January 27, 2024
- Preceded by: Jeff DeWit
- Succeeded by: Gina Swoboda

Member of the Arizona House of Representatives from the 18th district
- In office January 5, 2015 – January 14, 2019 Serving with Bob Robson
- Succeeded by: Jennifer Jermaine

Personal details
- Born: 1962 or 1963 (age 63–64)
- Party: Republican
- Spouse: Clark Norgaard
- Children: 3
- Education: University of North Dakota (BS); University of Phoenix (MBA)

Jill Norgaard (born 1962/1963) is an American politician and a former Republican member of the Arizona House of Representatives representing District 18 from 2015 to 2019. She previously worked as Vice President of McKechnie Plastics in Minnesota. Norgaard, as first vice chairwoman, has served as acting chair of the Arizona Republican Party from January 24-27, 2024 following the resignation of Jeff DeWit on January 24, 2024.

== Education ==
Norgaard earned her BS and MBA from the University of North Dakota.

== Elections ==
- 2018 – Norgaard was defeated in the general election by Democratic opponent Jennifer Jermaine.
- 2016 – Norgaard and Robson were unopposed in the Republican primary. Norgaard and Democratic challenger Mitzi Epstein defeated Robson and Green candidate Linda Macias on November 8. Norgaard was the second vote getter in the election with 50,613 votes.
- 2014 – Norgaard successfully ran alongside Bob Robson. Norgaard came in first ahead of Robson and Democratic challenger Denise "Mitzi" Epstein in the general election with 32,863 votes.

Party political offices
Preceded by Jeff DeWit	Chair of the Arizona Republican Party; Acting; 2024	Succeeded by Gina Swoboda
