= Gina Swoboda =

American politician (born 1969)

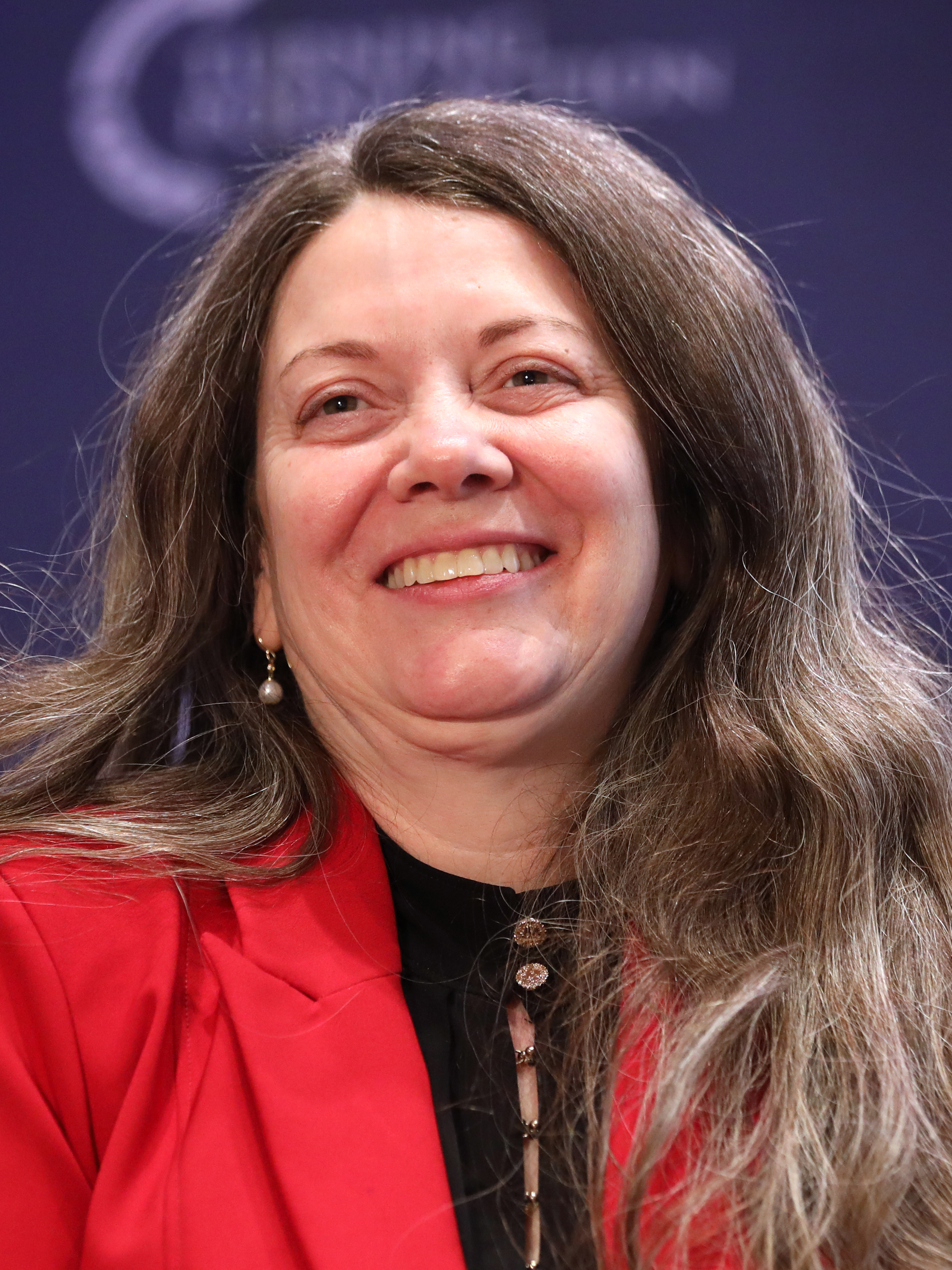
- Swoboda in 2024

Chair of the Arizona Republican Party
- In office January 27, 2024 – January 25, 2026
- Preceded by: Jill Norgaard (acting)
- Succeeded by: Sergio Arellano

Personal details
- Born: Gina Marie Hennessy; June 27, 1969 (age 57) New York City, New York, U.S.
- Party: Republican
- Education: Arizona State University, Tempe (BA)

Gina Marie Swoboda (born Gina Marie Hennessy in Queens, New York on June 27, 1969) is an American politician who served as chairwoman of the Arizona Republican Party from 2024 to 2026. She defeated state Corporation Commissioner Jim O'Connor with 67% of the vote to become chairwoman in January 2024.

During the 1980s and 1990s, Swoboda was a registered Democrat and a supporter of the Democratic Leadership Council, though she came from a Republican family. She became a Republican in 2008.

Prior to serving as chairwoman, Gina had worked in the State of Arizona's election office, served as a local registrar, as a precinct captain, and a statewide trainer for poll observers. Additionally, she worked in the Arizona Secretary of State's office under Democrat Katie Hobbs prior to Hobbs' election as governor in 2022.

In October 2025, Swoboda announced her candidacy in the 2026 election for Arizona's 1st congressional district, which was open following incumbent Republican David Schweikert's decision to run instead for governor. Swoboda was endorsed by President Donald Trump on October 20, 2025. In February 2026, she withdrew from the congressional election in order to run in the 2026 Arizona Secretary of State election.

Party political offices
Preceded by Jill Norgaard; Acting	Chair of the Arizona Republican Party; 2024–2026	Succeeded by Sergio Arellano
