= Arizona's 26th legislative district =

American legislative district

- Map of District 26: Approved January 21, 2022
- Senator: Flavio Bravo (D)
- House members: Cesar Aguilar (D); Quantá Crews (D)
- Registration: 39.97% Democratic; 18.99% Republican; 39.33% Other
- Demographics: 21% White; 9% Black/African American; 3% Native American; 4% Asian; 61% Hispanic
- Population: 237,193
- Voting-age population: 169,212
- Registered voters: 81,300

Arizona's 26th legislative district is one of 30 in the state, consisting of a section of Maricopa County. As of 2023, there are 34 precincts in the district, all in Maricopa, with a total registered voter population of 81,300. The district has an overall population of 237,193.

Following the 2020 United States redistricting cycle, the Arizona Independent Redistricting Commission (AIRC) redrew legislative district boundaries in Arizona. The 26th district was drawn as a majority Latino constituency, with 61% of residents being Hispanic or Latino. According to the AIRC, the district is outside of competitive range and considered leaning Democratic.

== Political representation ==
The district is represented in the 56th Arizona State Legislature, which convenes from January 1, 2023, to December 31, 2024, by Flavio Bravo (D-Phoenix) in the Arizona Senate and by Cesar Aguilar (D-Phoenix) and Quantá Crews (D-Phoenix) in the Arizona House of Representatives.

Flavio Bravo was appointed to the Senate to fill the seat after Raquel Terán resigned. Since Bravo had been a member of the Arizona House of Representatives, his appointment to the Arizona Senate created a vacancy for his seat in the House. Quantá Crews was appointed to fill Bravo's former seat in the House.

Name	Image	Residence	Office	Party
Flavio Bravo		Phoenix	State senator	Democrat
Cesar Aguilar		Phoenix	State representative	Democrat
Quantá Crews		Phoenix	State representative	Democrat

== Election results ==
The 2022 elections were the first in the newly drawn district.

=== Arizona Senate ===
2022 Arizona's 26th Senate district election
Party	Candidate	Votes	%
Democratic	Raquel Terán (incumbent)	25,583	100
Total votes		25,583	100
Democratic hold			

=== Arizona House of Representatives ===
2022 Arizona House of Representatives election, 26th district
Party	Candidate	Votes	%
Democratic	Cesar Aguilar	21,795	54.02
Democratic	Flavio Bravo	18,554	45.98
Total votes		40,349	100.00
Democratic hold			
Democratic hold			

== See also ==
- List of Arizona legislative districts
- Arizona State Legislature
