= Yolanda Bejarano =

American politician and union organizer

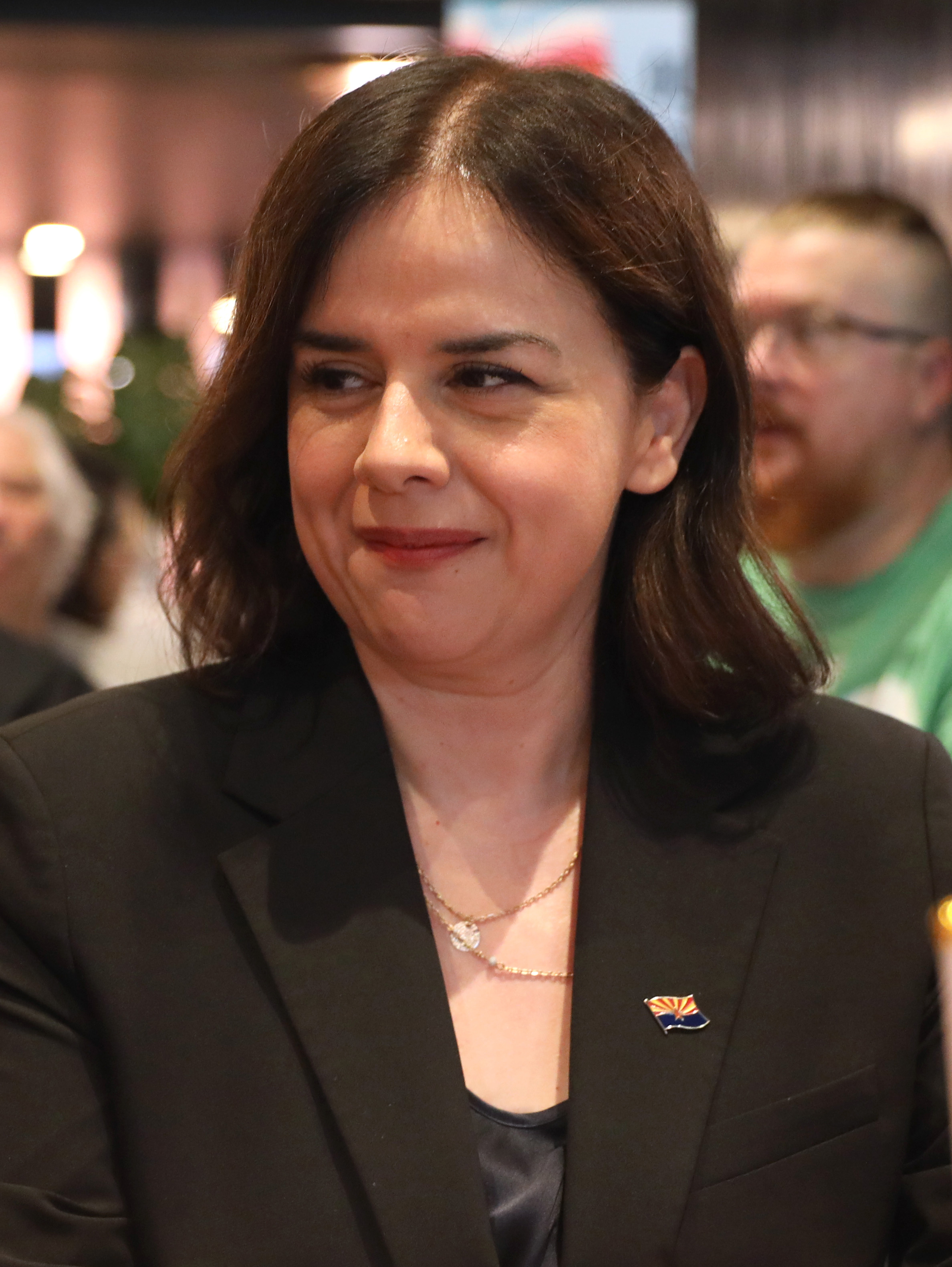

Chair of the Arizona Democratic Party
- In office January 28, 2023 – January 18, 2025
- Preceded by: Raquel Terán
- Succeeded by: Robert Branscomb

Personal details
- Born: 1974 or 1975 (age 51–52)
- Party: Democratic
- Education: Arizona State University, Tempe

Yolanda Bejarano (born 1974/1975) is an American labor union organizer who served as the chair of the Arizona Democratic Party from 2023 to 2025. She was a field director of the Communications Workers of America.

== Life ==
Bejarano was born in 1974 or 1975 and raised in Roll, Arizona. She attended Arizona State University where she led the emo-punk quartet, Slugger until it broke up the summer of 1996. She later became the lead singer and guitarist of Chula, a punk and mariachi band. In 1999, Bejarano described Chula as being indie rock with heavy punk influences.

Bejarano first entered politics following the passage of Arizona SB 1070. She was a field director for Communications Workers of America. She served as vice chair of the Arizona Democratic Party. In January 2023, Bejarano was elected with seventy percent of the votes to a two-year term as chair. She defeated Steve Gallardo who had been endorsed by governor Katie Hobbs. Bejarano succeeded Raquel Terán. In January 2025, Bejarano unsuccessfully sought reelection to the position, losing to Robert Branscomb.

Party political offices
Preceded by Raquel Terán	Chair of the Arizona Democratic Party; 2023–2025	Succeeded by Robert Branscomb
