= Nancy Gutierrez (Arizona politician) =

American politician

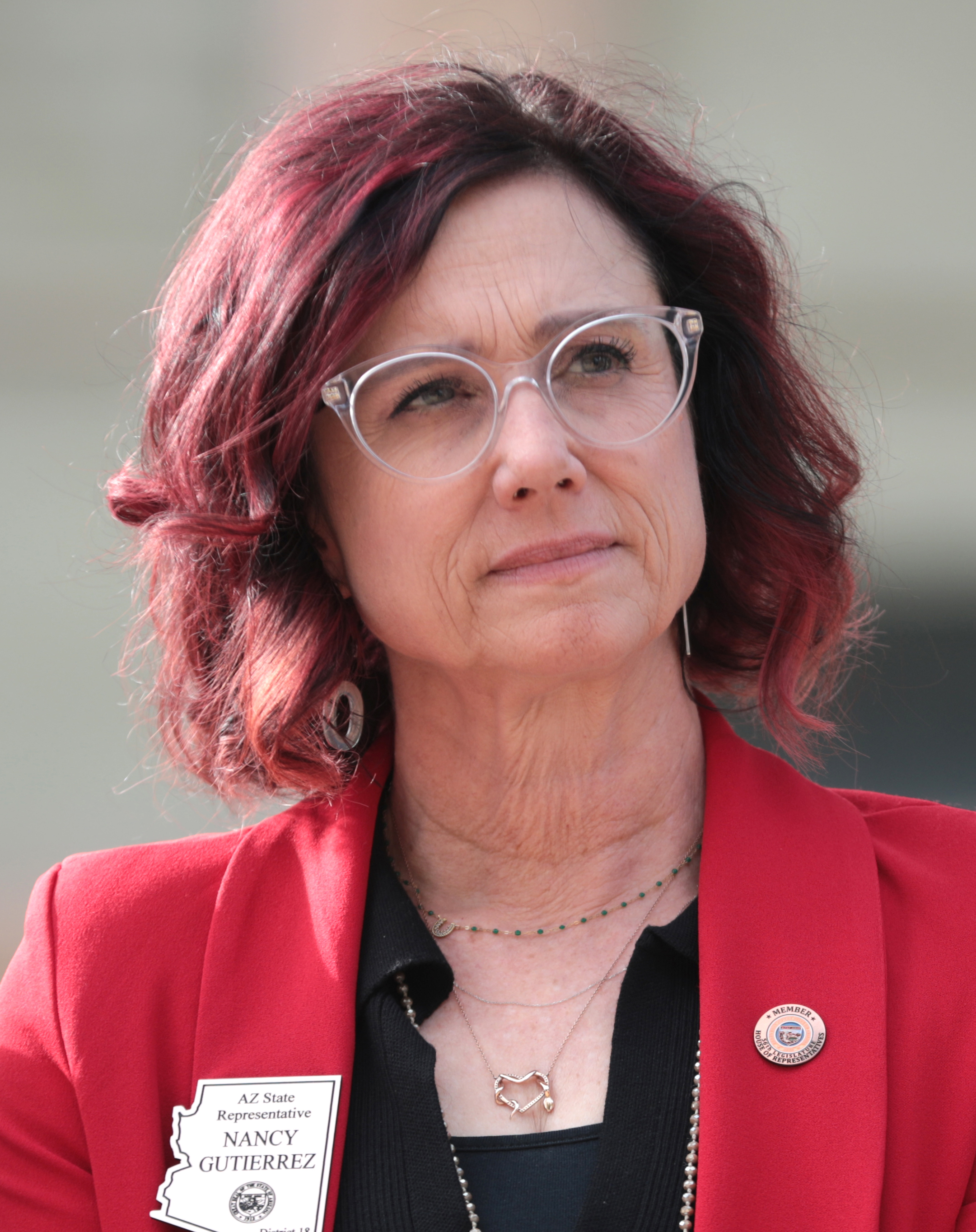
- Gutierrez in 2023

Member of the Arizona House of Representatives from the 18th district
- Incumbent
- Assumed office January 9, 2023 Serving with Christopher Mathis
- Preceded by: Jennifer Jermaine

Personal details
- Born: Tucson, Arizona, U.S.
- Party: Democratic
- Education: Northern Arizona University

Nancy Gutierrez is an American politician and former math teacher serving as a member of the Arizona House of Representatives. A Democrat, she was elected to represent the 18th district in 2022.

== Life ==
Gutierrez earned a B.S. in elementary education with an emphasis in mathematics from the Northern Arizona University in 1994.

Gutierrez began teaching in Arizona in 1994. She has taught preschool, elementary, high school, and community college mathematics. She moved to Tucson, Arizona with her children and husband in 2007. In 2009, she began teaching yoga. Gutierrez is a certified yoga teacher. In 2010, she was elected president of the Manzanita Elementary School Family Faculty Organization. In 2013, she began teaching at Tucson High Magnet School. Gutierrez is a member of the Tucson Education Association and the Arizona Education Association. In 2018, she was elected president of the Tucson chapter of the National Organization for Women.

In 2022, she was elected to represent district 18 of the Arizona House of Representatives.
