= Jennifer Jermaine =

American politician

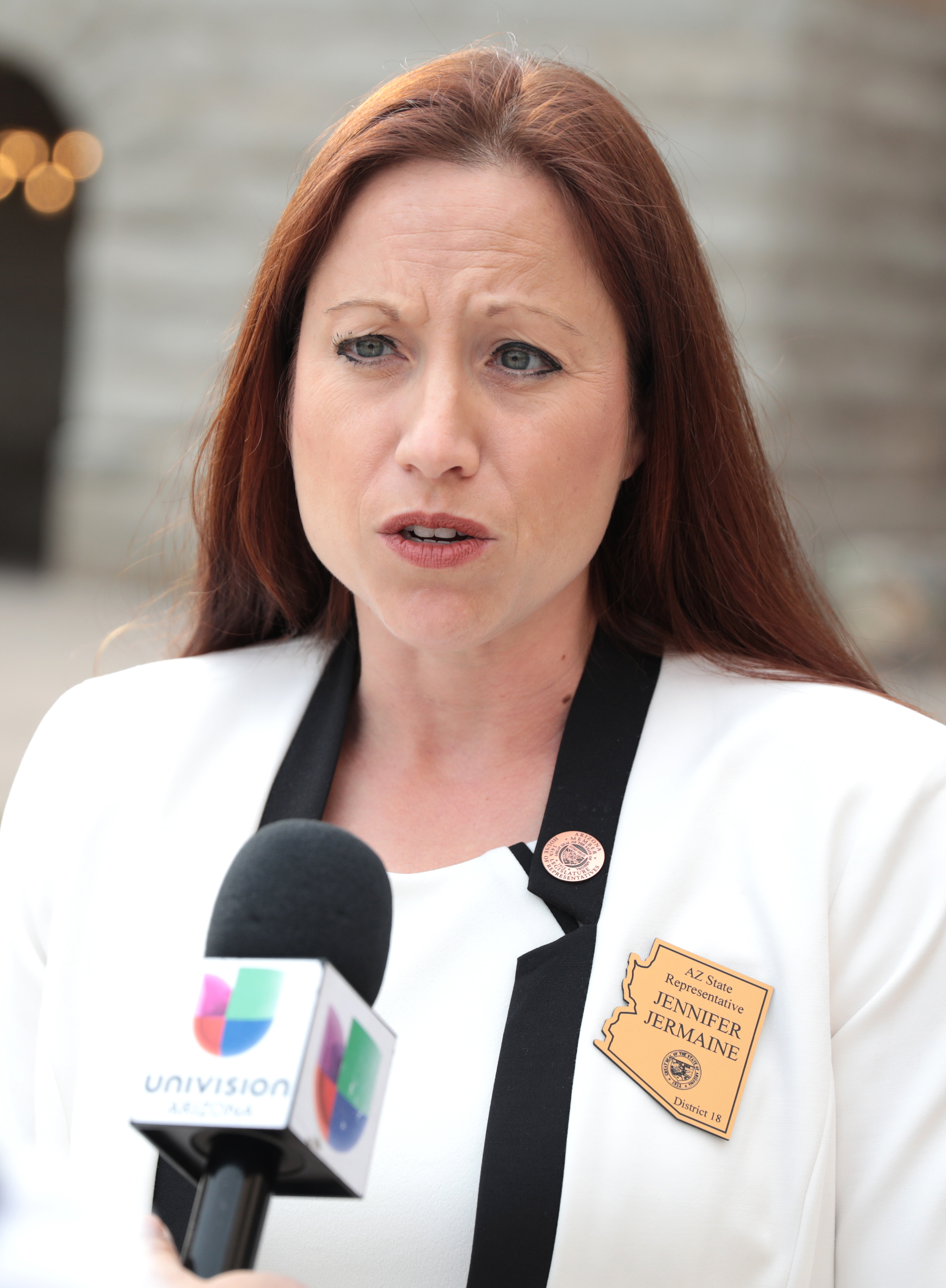
- Jermaine in 2019

Member of the Arizona House of Representatives from the 18th district
- In office January 14, 2019 – January 9, 2023 Serving with Mitzi Epstein
- Preceded by: Jill Norgaard
- Succeeded by: Nancy Gutierrez

Personal details
- Party: Democratic

Jennifer Jermaine is an American politician and a former Democratic member of the Arizona House of Representatives representing District 18 from 2019 to 2023. She was elected in 2018 to succeed incumbent Republican State Representative Jill Norgaard. She is a member of the White Earth Nation.

She graduated with a Master’s in Public Administration from Arizona State University, and is the founder of Stronger Together Arizona and the We the People Summit.

== See also ==
- List of Native American politicians
- Native American women in politics
