= 2026 Arizona Secretary of State election =

- November 3, 2026
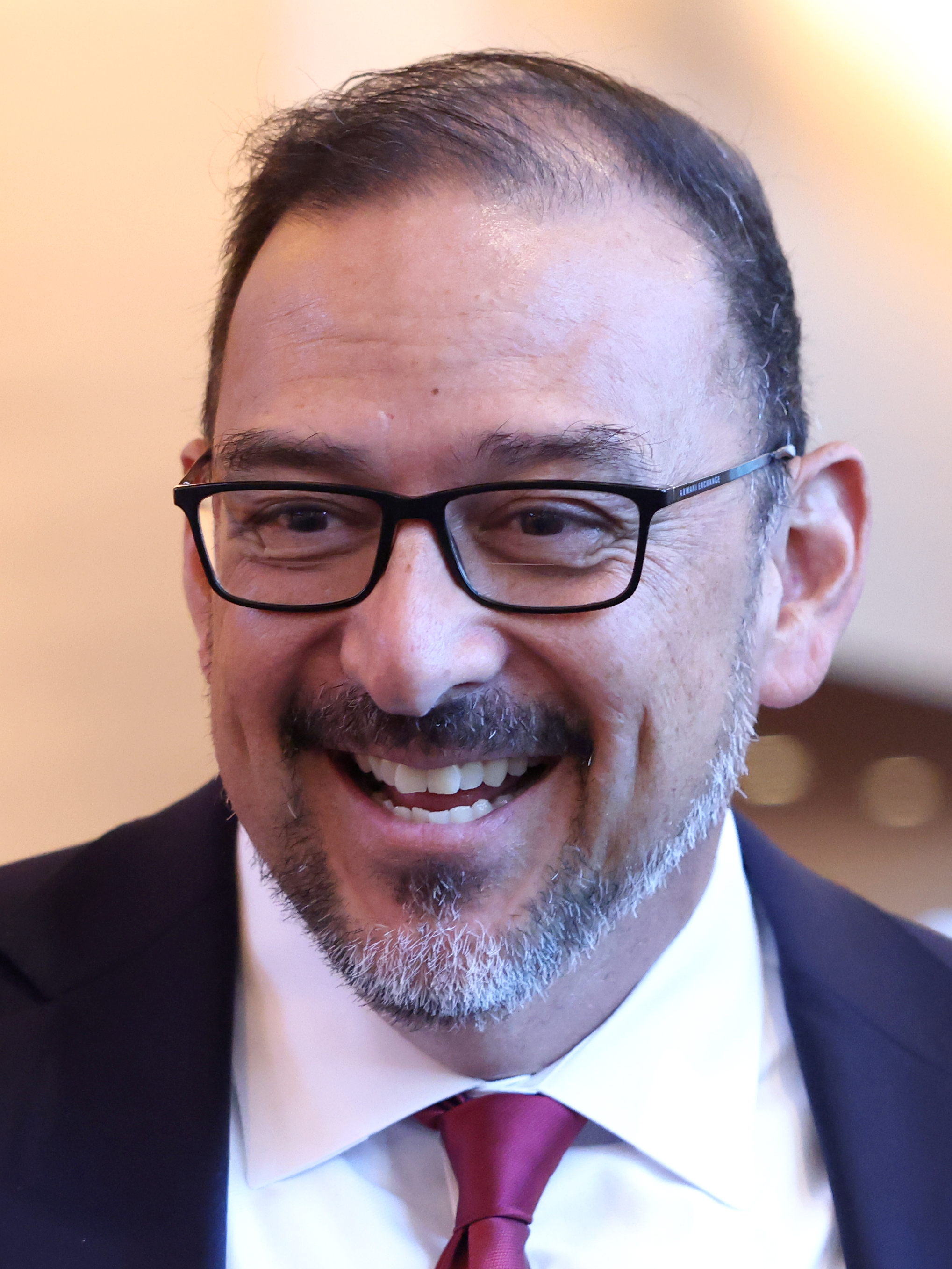

Nominee	Adrian Fontes	Alexander Kolodin
Party	Democratic	Republican
Popular vote	1,382,155	1,098,857
Percentage	54.85%	43.61%
- Fontes: 50–60% 60–70% 70–80% Kolodin: 50–60% 60–70% 70–80%
Secretary of State before election
Adrian Fontes
Democratic
Elected Secretary of State
Adrian Fontes
Democratic

The 2026 Arizona Secretary of State election took place on November 3, 2026, to elect the Secretary of State of Arizona. Incumbent Democratic Secretary of State Adrian Fontes won re-election to a second term in office. Primary elections took place on July 21, 2026.

== Democratic primary ==
=== Candidates ===
==== Nominee ====
- Adrian Fontes, incumbent secretary of state

=== Endorsements ===
Adrian Fontes

Organizations

- Reproductive Freedom for All
- VoteVets.org

=== Results ===
Democratic primary results
Party	Candidate	Votes	%
Democratic	Adrian Fontes (incumbent)	496,732	100.0
Total votes		496,732	100.0

== Republican primary ==
=== Candidates ===
==== Nominee ====
- Alexander Kolodin, state representative

==== Eliminated in primary ====
- Gina Swoboda, former chair of the Arizona Republican Party (2024–2026)

=== Endorsements ===
Alexander Kolodin

Organizations

- Republicans for National Renewal
- Turning Point Action

=== Polling ===
Poll source	Date(s) administered	Sample size (Note: Key: A – all adults RV – registered voters LV – likely voters V – unclear)	Margin of error	Alexander Kolodin	Gina Swoboda	Undecided
NextGen Polling	July 8–9, 2026	1,707 (LV)	± 2.5%	44%	20%	37%
NextGen Polling	June 16–17, 2026	1,683 (LV)	± 2.5%	16%	11%	73%
Stealth Analytics	May 13–15, 2026	1,100 (LV)	± 3.0%	21%	10%	68%
Noble Predictive Insights	February 23–26, 2026	384 (RV)	± 4.99%	17%	16%	67%

=== Results ===
Primary results by county: Kolodin: 50–60%; 60–70%

Republican primary results
Party	Candidate	Votes	%
Republican	Alexander Kolodin	345,675	59.8
Republican	Gina Swoboda	231,986	40.2
Total votes		577,661	100.0

== Green primary ==
=== Background ===
The Green Party of Arizona disavowed candidate Duwayne Collier, accusing him of being a Republican running to draw votes from Adrian Fontes. Collier's campaign received services from firms and attorneys with connections to Republicans, and paid Collier's wife at least $20,000 to serve as campaign manager. The Green Party supported write-in candidate Jon Ralston in the July 21st primary, but Collier obtained the nomination.

In early September, it was reported that the Arizona Attorney General’s Office was investigating allegations that Collier's campaign, among others, had used fraudulent donations with falsified voter information to obtain public funding.

=== Candidates ===
==== Nominee ====
- Duwayne Collier

==== Eliminated in primary ====
- Jon Robert Ralston, Green Party of Arizona recorder (write-in)

=== Results ===
Green primary results
Party	Candidate	Votes	%
Green	Duwayne Collier	421	66.0
Green	Jon Robert Ralston (write-in)	217	34.0
Total votes		638	100.0

== General election ==
=== Predictions ===
Source	Ranking	As of
Sabato's Crystal Ball	Likely D	September 9, 2026

=== Post-primary endorsements ===
Adrian Fontes (D)

Organizations

- Everytown for Gun Safety

=== Polling ===
Poll source	Date(s) administered	Sample size	Margin of error	Adrian Fontes (D)	Alexander Kolodin (R)	Other	Undecided
GrayHouse (R) (Note: Poll commissioned by Elijah Norton's campaign, the Republican candidate running for 2026 Arizona State Treasurer election)	October 28–29, 2026	500 (LV)	± 4.2%	50%	44%	—	—
Noble Predictive Insights	October 26–28, 2026	511 (LV)	± 4.3%	50%	44%	1% (Note: "Another candidate not listed" with 1%; Collier (G) with <1%)	5%
HighGround, Inc.	October 21–25, 2026	400 (LV)	± 4.9%	50%	38%	2% (Note: Collier (G) with 2%; "Some other candidate" with <1%)	10%
HighGround, Inc.	October 6–8, 2026	400 (LV)	± 4.9%	45%	34%	4% (Note: Collier with 3%, "Some other candidate" with 1%)	17%
Grayhouse (R)	October 6–8, 2026	550 (LV)	± 4.2%	48%	42%	1% (Note: Collier (G) with 1%)	8%
Equis Research	September 1–9, 2026	1,214 (RV)	± 3.2%	46%	44%	—	10%
Arizona State University	August 18 – September 4, 2026	1,300 (RV)	± 2.7%	39%	35%	3% (Note: Collier (G) with 3%)	23%
HighGround, Inc.	August 15–18, 2026	400 (LV)	± 4.9%	43%	35%	3%	19%
Grayhouse (R)	August 11–13, 2026	600 (LV)	± 4.0%	46%	42%	–	12%
Stealth Analytics	August 11–13, 2026	530 (LV)	± 4.3%	39%	38%	2% (Note: Duwayne Collier (G) with 2%)	21%
Noble Predictive Insights	August 10–13, 2026	923 (LV)	± 3.2%	41%	35%	5% (Note: Duwayne Collier (G) with 3%; "Another candidate not listed" with 2%)	20%

=== Results ===
2026 Arizona Secretary of State election
Party	Candidate	Votes	%
Democratic	Adrian Fontes (incumbent)	1,382,155	54.85
Republican	Alexander Kolodin	1,098,857	43.61
Green	Duwayne Collier	37,639	1.49
Write-in		1,283	0.05
Total votes		2,519,934	100.0
Democratic hold			

== Notes ==
Partisan clients

== See also ==
- 2026 United States secretary of state elections
