= Priya Sundareshan =

American politician

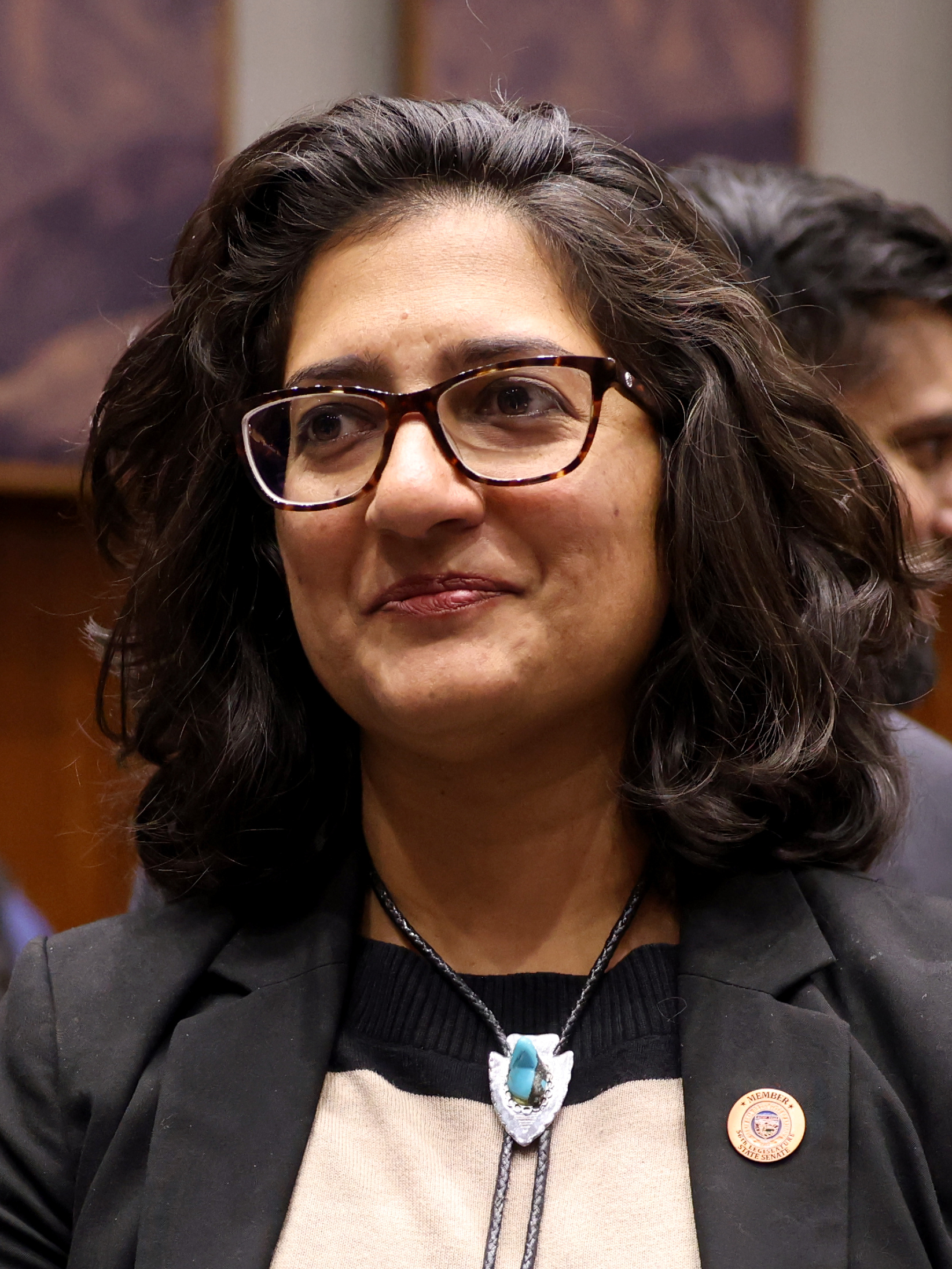
- Sundareshan in 2025

Minority Leader of the Arizona Senate
- Incumbent
- Assumed office January 13, 2025
- Preceded by: Mitzi Epstein

Member of the Arizona Senate from the 18th district
- Incumbent
- Assumed office January 9, 2023
- Preceded by: Victoria Steele

Personal details
- Born: Priyanka Malur Sundareshan c.1984 (age 41–42) Tucson, Arizona, U.S.
- Party: Democratic
- Education: Massachusetts Institute of Technology (BS); University of Arizona (JD, MS)
- Website: Campaign Website

Priyanka "Priya" Malur Sundareshan is an American attorney and politician who is a member of the Arizona Senate from the 18th district. She assumed office on January 9, 2023.

== Early life and education ==
Sundareshan was born to an Indian American family in Tucson, Arizona. She earned a Bachelor of Science degree in chemical engineering from the Massachusetts Institute of Technology (M.I.T.) in 2006. In 2011 Sundareshan earned both a Juris Doctor from the University of Arizona James E. Rogers College of Law, as well as Master of Science in natural resource economics also from the University of Arizona.

== Career ==
In addition to holding elected office, Sundareshan serves as the Director of Natural Resource Use and Management Clinic at the University of Arizona James E. Rogers College of Law. Previously, she worked as an attorney for the Environmental Defense Fund from 2015 to 2019, and additionally as an associate attorney at the law firm Pillsbury Winthrop Shaw Pittman in Washington, D.C. from 2012 to 2015. Sundareshan also worked as an analyst for PA Consulting Group in Cambridge, MA from 2006 to 2008.

=== 2022 Arizona Senate election ===
Due to the redistricting of Arizona legislative districts resulting from the 2020 census, the 18th legislative district was relocated from the Phoenix metropolitan area - where it had been represented by Arizona Senator Sean Bowie - to the Tucson metropolitan area, becoming an open seat. Sundareshan faced off against Arizona Legislator Morgan Abraham in the Democratic primary, defeating him 55.6% to 44.4%. Sundareshan defeated Republican former Department of Defense employee Stan Caine in the general election.

== Electoral history ==
Arizona Senate 18th District, 2022 Primary Election
Party	Candidate	Votes	%
Democratic	Priya Sundareshan	20,571	55.6%
Democratic	Morgan Abraham	16,439	44.4%
Total votes		37,010	100%

Arizona Senate 18th District, 2022 General Election
Party	Candidate	Votes	%
Democratic	Priya Sundareshan	67,121	62.2%
Republican	Stan Caine	40,731	37.8%
Total votes		107,852	100%
Democratic hold			

Arizona Senate
Preceded by Mitzi Epstein	Minority Leader of the Arizona Senate; 2025–present	Incumbent
