= David Farnsworth =

American counterfeiter (1760–1778)

- Born: December 5, 1760; Charlestown, New Hampshire, British America
- Died: November 10, 1778 (aged 17); Rocky Hill, Connecticut, United States
- Occupations: spy, counterfeiter
- Status: Executed by hanging
- Motive: Colonial loyalist who served in British war effort
- Convictions: Espionage; Forgery
- Penalty: Death

David Farnsworth (December 5, 1760 – November 10, 1778) was a Colonial-era American Loyalist. He was a British agent during the American Revolutionary War. George Washington had him hanged for his involvement in a plot to destroy the American economy by placing counterfeit money into circulation.

== American Revolution ==
Farnsworth initially joined up with Patriot forces in Cambridge, Massachusetts at the age of 15 in 1775, serving as a drummer and participating in the Battle of Bunker Hill.

The use of counterfeit money has been used as a strategy in warfare for centuries. The idea is to flood the enemy's economy with fake money, thus devaluing the real money and causing an economic collapse, rendering the enemy unable to fund their side of the war. During the American Revolutionary War, the Continental Congress decided to create a new Continental currency to fund the war. Among the people enlisted to print this new currency was Paul Revere.

To counter this, the British enlisted teams of counterfeiters to travel throughout the American Colonies, placing their counterfeits into circulation in the hopes that it would devalue the Continental currency. These counterfeiters were known as "shovers," presumably for their ability to "shove" the fake money into everyday use.

David Farnsworth and his partner John Blair were among the best-known of these counterfeiters, having been caught with over $10,000 in fake Continental dollars in their possession.

On October 8, 1778, in a court-martial held in Danbury, Connecticut by order of General Horatio Gates and Brigadier General John Paterson, Farnsworth and Blair were tried for, and convicted of, "being found about the Encampment of the Armies of The United-States as Spies and having a large sum of counterfeit Money about them which they brought from New-York". The sentence of execution was prescribed by a two-thirds vote. On October 23 in Fredericksburg, New York, Commander in Chief George Washington approved the sentence and ordered their immediate execution upon their arrival at General Gates' division. Farnsworth and Blair were executed in Rocky Hill, Hartford County, Connecticut on November 10, 1778.

== In popular culture ==
In fiction, Farnsworth appeared in the Futurama episode "All The Presidents' Heads" as the ancestor of Professor Hubert Farnsworth. As in history, he was presented as a counterfeiter and British agent. However, in an alternate timeline featured in the episode, in which Great Britain won the Revolution and all of North America became known as "West Britannia", he killed George Washington and was granted a dukedom.
