= Sean Bowie =

American politician

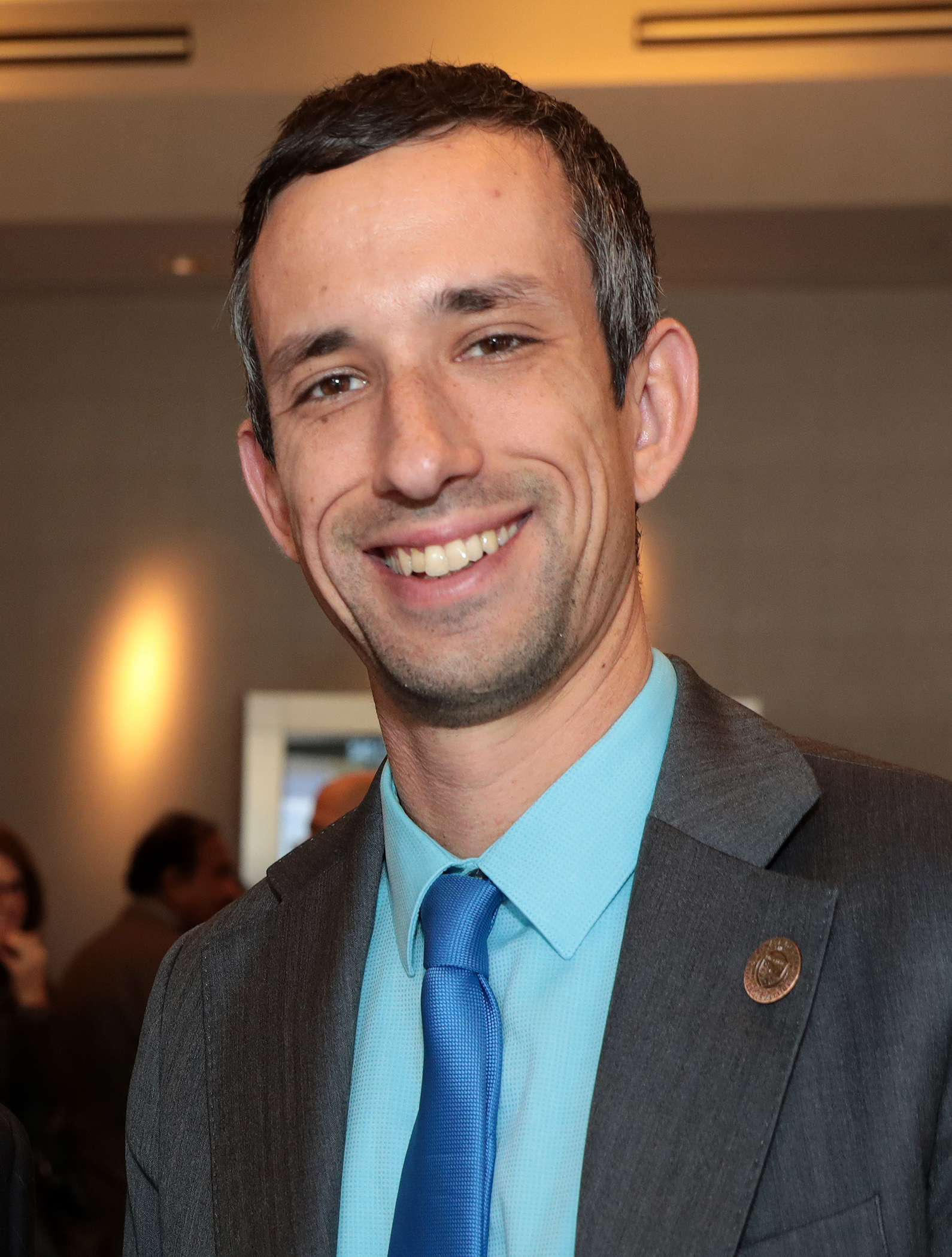
- Bowie in 2019

Member of the Arizona Senate from the 18th district
- In office January 9, 2017 – January 9, 2023
- Preceded by: Jeff Dial
- Succeeded by: Priya Sundareshan

Personal details
- Party: Democratic
- Website: Campaign Website

Sean Bowie is an American politician and a former Democratic member of the Arizona State Senate elected to represent District 18 in 2016. Bowie previously worked as a Senior Planning Analyst for the Provost's office at Arizona State University and now serves as a Professor of Practice at the Watts College of Public Service & Community Solutions. On September 8, 2021, Bowie announced that he would not seek re-election to the Arizona Senate in 2022.

== Education ==
Bowie received a bachelor's degree in Political Science and History from Arizona State University and a master's degree in public policy from Carnegie Mellon University.

== Elections ==
- 2016 Bowie ran unopposed in the Democratic Primary. He defeated Republican Frank Schmuck, who defeated incumbent Jeff Dial in the republican primary, in the general election.
