= Christopher Mathis =

American politician

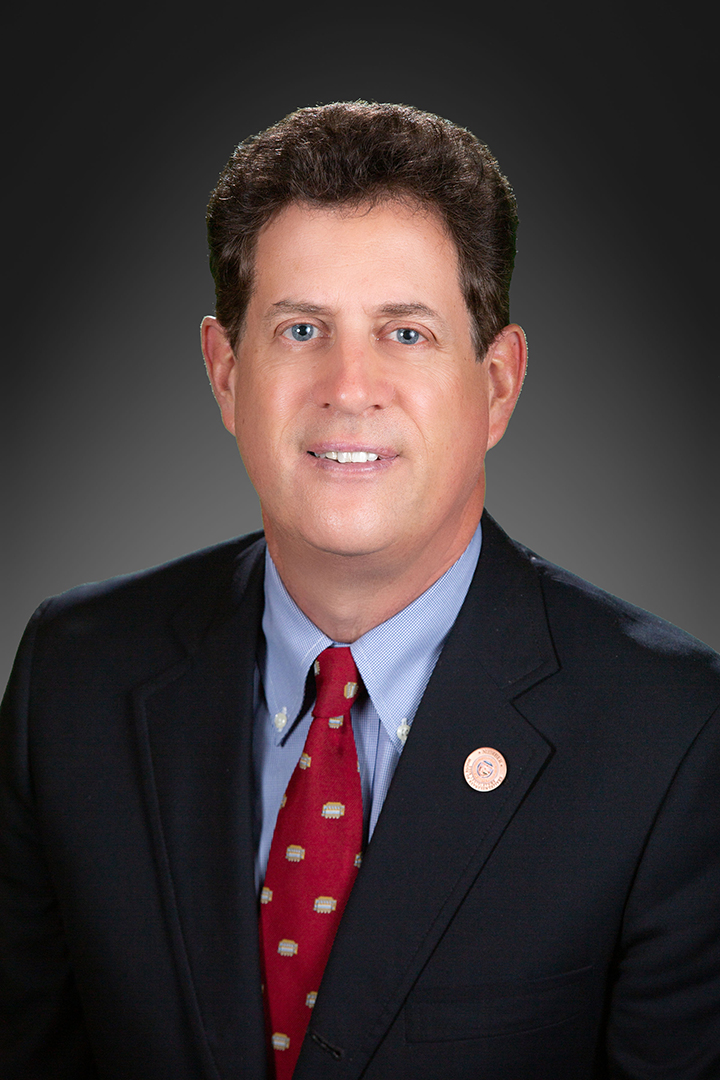
- Mathis in 2022

Member of the Arizona House of Representatives
- Incumbent
- Assumed office December 7, 2021 Serving with Nancy Gutierrez
- Preceded by: Randy Friese
- Constituency: 9th district (2021-2023); 18th district (2023-present)

Personal details
- Party: Democratic
- Education: University of Illinois Urbana–Champaign (AB, JD); Harvard University (MPA, MPH)
- Website: Campaign website

Christopher H. Mathis is an American attorney and politician serving as a member of the Arizona House of Representatives from the 18th district. He previously represented the 9th district and assumed office on December 7, 2021.

== Education ==
Mathis earned a Bachelor of Arts degree in history from the University of Illinois Urbana–Champaign, a Juris Doctor from the University of Illinois College of Law, a Master of Public Administration from the Harvard Kennedy School, and a Master of Public Health from the Harvard T.H. Chan School of Public Health.

== Career ==
Prior to joining the legislature, Mathis has worked as an elder law and estate planning attorney and a professor at the James E. Rogers College of Law. He also worked as a health care legislative assistant to U.S. Senator Chuck Hagel and as professional staff in the Health Care Policy Department at Harvard Medical School.
