= Raquel Terán =

American politician (born 1977)

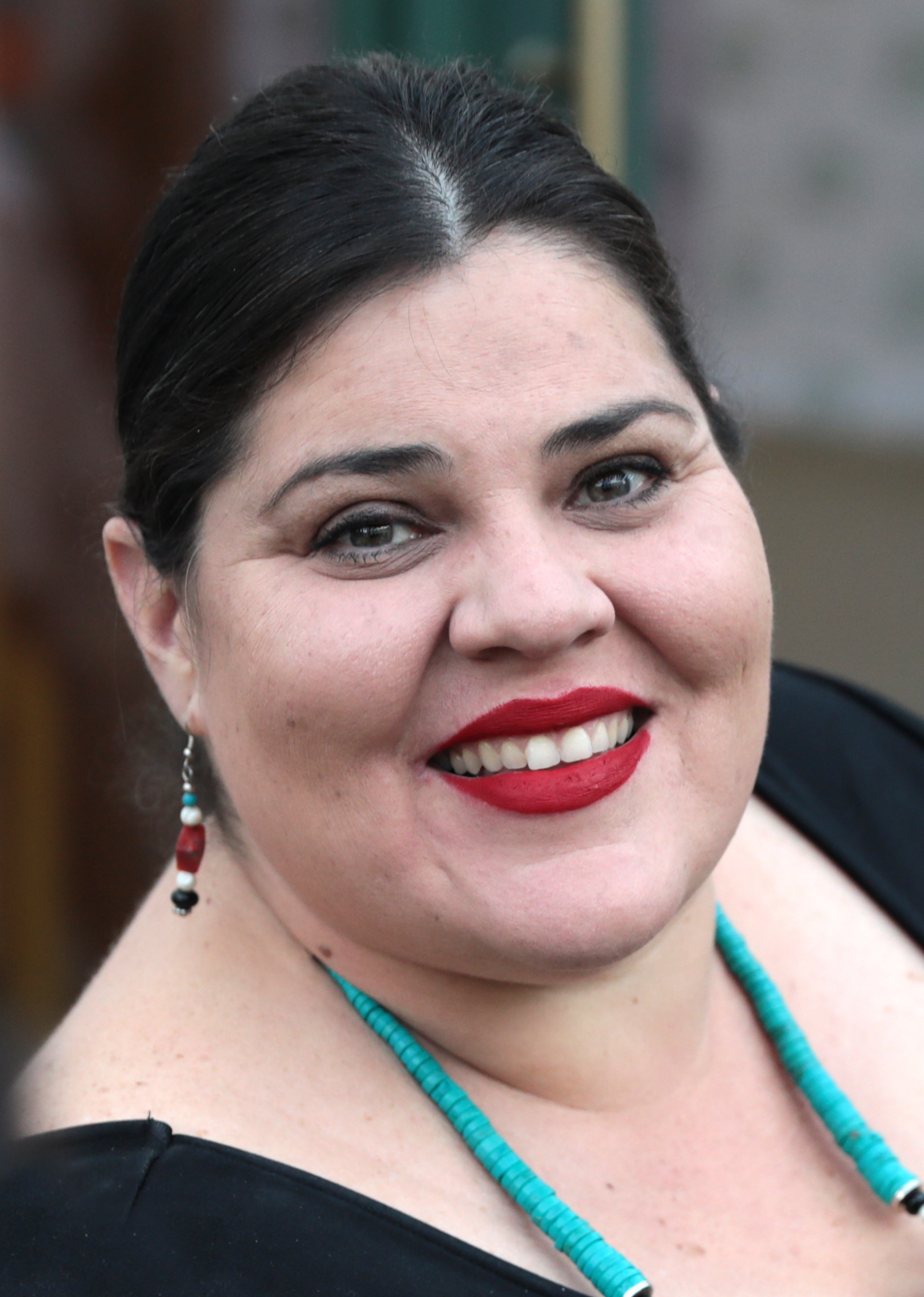
- Teràn in 2022

Minority Leader of the Arizona Senate
- In office January 9, 2023 – March 2, 2023
- Preceded by: Rebecca Rios
- Succeeded by: Mitzi Epstein

Member of the Arizona Senate
- In office September 28, 2021 – April 13, 2023
- Preceded by: Tony Navarrete
- Succeeded by: Flavio Bravo
- Constituency: 30th district (2021–2023); 26th district (2023)

Chair of the Arizona Democratic Party
- In office January 23, 2021 – January 28, 2023
- Preceded by: Felecia Rotellini
- Succeeded by: Yolanda Bejarano

Member of the Arizona House of Representatives from the 30th district
- In office January 14, 2019 – September 28, 2021 Serving with Robert Meza
- Preceded by: Tony Navarrete
- Succeeded by: Christian Solorio

Personal details
- Born: November 30, 1977 (age 48) Douglas, Arizona, U.S.
- Party: Democratic

Raquel Terán (born November 30, 1977) is an American politician who previously served as a member of the Arizona Senate from the 26th district. She previously served in the Arizona House of Representatives and as chair of the Arizona Democratic Party.

== Early life ==
Terán was born in Douglas, Arizona. Her citizenship was challenged in court by an anti-immigration advocate in 2012, and again after her 2018 election. The lawsuits were both dismissed.

== Career ==
Prior to being elected to the state legislature, Terán was a community organizer who was active in opposing Arizona SB 1070, which she denounced as "anti-immigrant sentiment." She was part of the successful recall of Russell Pearce, the primary sponsor of SB 1070, in 2011.

Terán was elected in November 2018 to the Arizona House of Representatives, and she assumed office on January 14, 2019. In 2021, Terán was elected chair of the Arizona Democratic Party. On September 15, 2021, Terán was appointed to the Arizona State Senate to fill the remainder of Tony Navarrete's two-year term following his resignation.

The Senate Democratic Caucus elected Téran to serve as the minority leader of the Arizona State Senate, succeeding outgoing minority leader Rebecca Rios, in December 2022. She stepped down as state party chair to focus on the position, and stepped down as minority leader in March 2023, as she explored a run for the United States House of Representatives.

In April 2023, after Congressman Ruben Gallego announced his intention to run for the United States Senate against incumbent Senator Kyrsten Sinema, Téran announced her candidacy to succeed Gallego in Arizona's 3rd congressional district of the U.S. House of Representatives in the 2024 elections. On April 13, 2023, Terán announced she was resigning from the Arizona Senate to focus on her congressional run. In July 2023, the Working Families Party announced their endorsement of Terán. Terán conceded her campaign after losing the Democratic Primary to Yassamin Ansari by 39 votes.

In 2023, she opposed Arizona state legislation to increase housing supply through faster permitting processes and less restrictive zoning regulations. She said that she wanted guarantees for affordable housing.

Party political offices
Preceded by Felecia Rotellini	Chair of the Arizona Democratic Party; 2021–2023	Succeeded by Yolanda Bejarano
Arizona Senate
Preceded by Rebecca Rios	Minority Leader of the Arizona Senate; 2023	Succeeded by Mitzi Epstein
