= Christian Solorio =

American politician

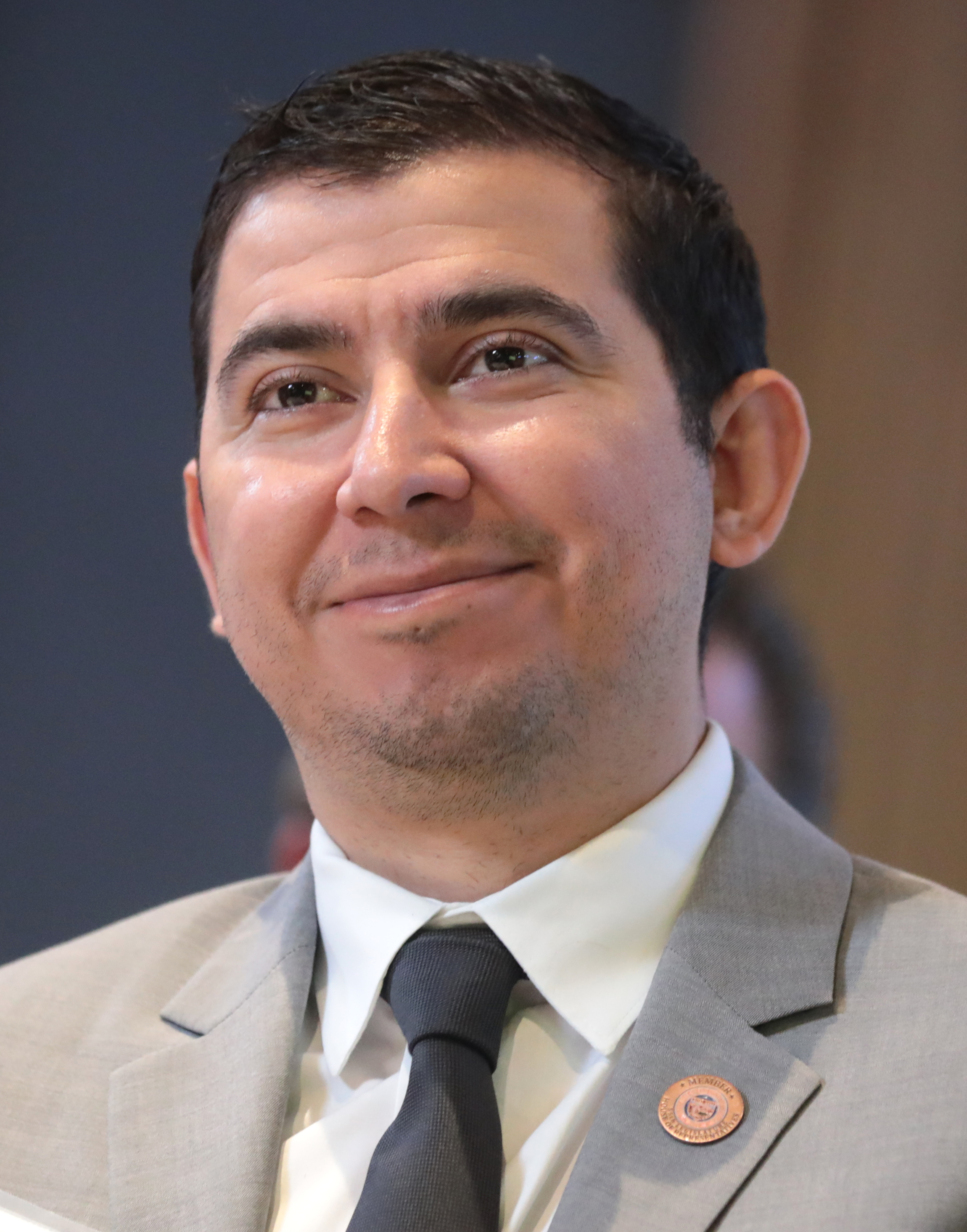

Member of the Arizona House of Representatives from the 30th district
- In office November 4, 2021 – January 9, 2023
- Appointed by: Maricopa County Board of Supervisors
- Preceded by: Raquel Terán
- Succeeded by: John Gillette

Personal details
- Citizenship: United States
- Party: Democratic

Christian Solorio is an American politician and former member of the Arizona House of Representatives from the 30th district. He was appointed to the position on October 28, 2021, succeeding Raquel Terán, and defeated for reelection in 2022. Solorio is currently a member of the Alhambra Elementary School District Governing Board.
