= Arizona's 18th legislative district =

American legislative district

- Map of District 18: Approved January 21, 2022
- Senator: Priya Sundareshan (D)
- House members: Christopher Mathis (D); Nancy Gutierrez (D)
- Registration: 39.06% Democratic; 27.40% Republican; 31.91% Other
- Demographics: 64% White; 5% Black/African American; 2% Native American; 6% Asian; 22% Hispanic
- Population: 243,411
- Voting-age population: 203,739
- Registered voters: 162,116

Arizona's 18th legislative district is one of 30 in the state, consisting of a section of Pima County. As of 2023, there are 65 precincts in the district, all in Pima, with a total registered voter population of 162,116. The district has an overall population of 243,411.

Following the 2020 United States redistricting cycle, the Arizona Independent Redistricting Commission (AIRC) redrew legislative district boundaries in Arizona. According to the AIRC, the district is outside of competitive range and considered leaning Democratic.

== Political representation ==
The district is represented in the 56th Arizona State Legislature, which convenes from January 1, 2023, to December 31, 2024, by Priya Sundareshan (D-Tucson) in the Arizona Senate and by Christopher Mathis (D-Tucson) and Nancy Gutierrez (D-Tucson) in the Arizona House of Representatives.

Name	Image	Residence	Office	Party
Priya Sundareshan		Tucson	State senator	Democrat
Christopher Mathis		Tucson	State representative	Democrat
Nancy Gutierrez		Tucson	State representative	Democrat

== Election results ==
The 2022 elections were the first in the newly drawn district.

=== Arizona Senate ===
2022 Arizona's 18th Senate district election
Party	Candidate	Votes	%
Democratic	Priya Sundareshan	67,343	62.22
Republican	Stan Caine	40,896	37.78
Total votes		108,239	100
Democratic hold			

=== Arizona House of Representatives ===
2022 Arizona House of Representatives election, 18th district
Party	Candidate	Votes	%
Democratic	Nancy Gutierrez	61,960	38.19
Democratic	Christopher Mathis (incumbent)	59,063	36.40
Republican	Linda Evans	41,217	25.40
Total votes		162,240	100.00
Democratic hold			
Democratic hold			

== See also ==
- List of Arizona legislative districts
- Arizona State Legislature
